= Parkway Drive discography =

Band discography

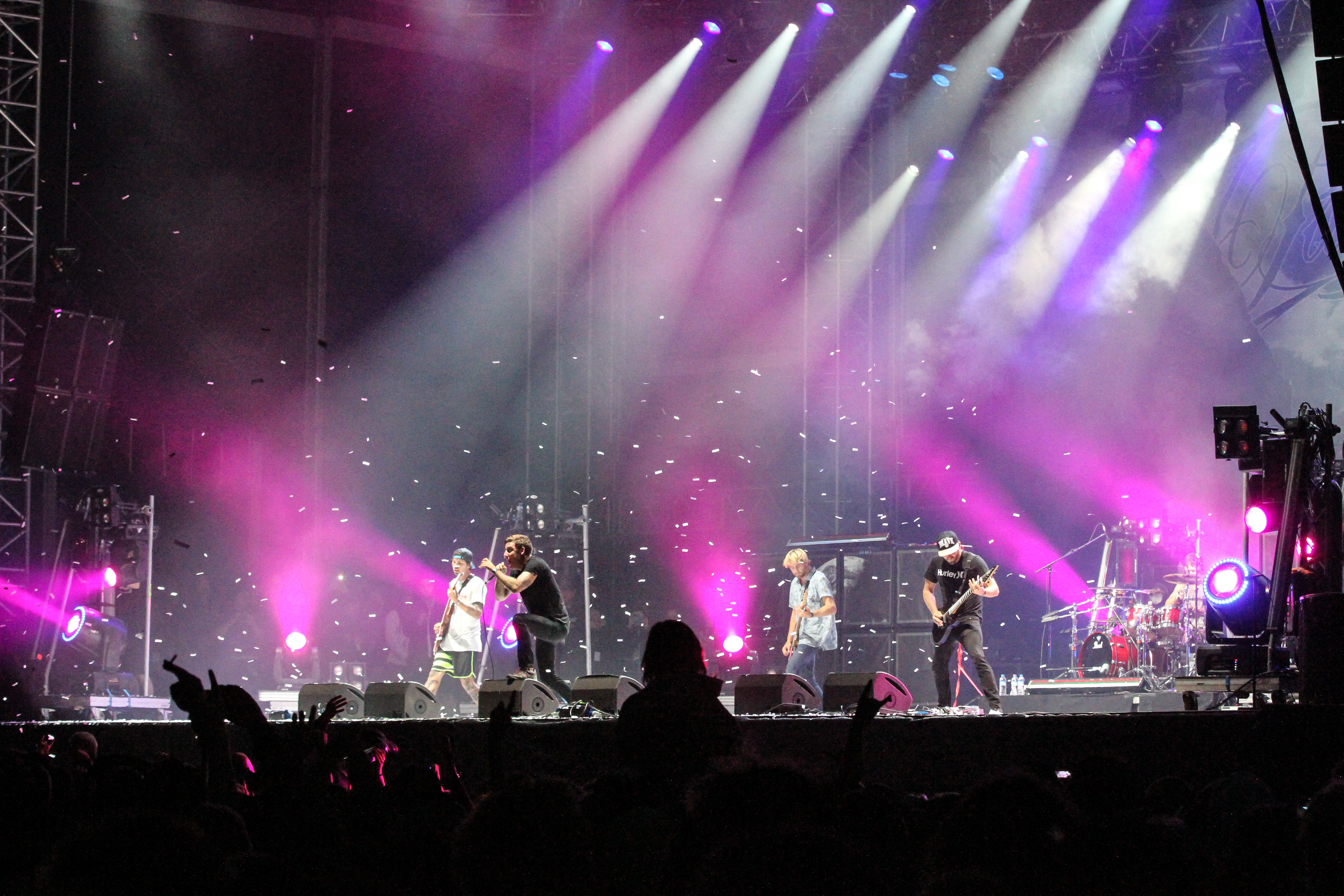
- Studio albums: 7
- EPs: 1
- Live albums: 1
- Singles: 17
- Video albums: 3
- Music videos: 17

Australian metalcore band Parkway Drive have released seven studio albums, one live album and three video albums.

== Albums ==
=== Studio albums ===
List of studio albums, with selected chart positions
Title	Album details	Peak positions										Sales	Certifications (sales thresholds)
Title	Album details	AUS	AUT	BEL (FL)	BEL (WA)	GER	NZ	SWI	UK	US	US Heat.	Sales	Certifications (sales thresholds)
Killing with a Smile	Released: 12 September 2005; Label: Resist; Epitaph; Formats: CD, digital download	39	—	166	—	—	—	—	—	—	—		ARIA: Gold
Horizons	Released: 6 October 2007; Label: Resist; Epitaph; Formats: CD, digital download	6	—	—	—	—	—	—	—	—	27		ARIA: Gold
Deep Blue	Released: 25 June 2010; Label: Resist; Epitaph; Burning Heart; Formats: CD, digital download	2	68	—	—	46	21	84	112	39	—		ARIA: Gold
Atlas	Released: 26 October 2012; Label: Resist; Epitaph; Formats: CD, digital download	3	33	74	162	22	12	57	48	32	—	US: 63,000	ARIA: Gold
Ire	Released: 25 September 2015; Label: Resist; Epitaph; Formats: CD, digital download	1	11	16	45	8	15	12	23	29	—		ARIA: Gold
Reverence	Released: 4 May 2018; Label: Resist; Epitaph; Formats: CD, LP, digital download	1	6	5	37	3	34	3	14	35	—		ARIA: Gold
Darker Still	Released: 9 September 2022; Label: Resist; Epitaph; Formats: CD, LP, digital download	1	7	11	30	5	—	—	56	—	—		
"—" denotes a recording that did not chart or was not released in that territory.

=== Live albums ===
List of live albums, with selected chart positions
Title	Album details	Peak positions			
Title	Album details	AUS	AUT	GER	SWI
Viva the Underdogs	Released: 27 March 2020; Label: Resist; Epitaph; Formats: CD, digital download, streaming	70	19	5	22

=== Video albums ===
List of video albums, with selected certifications
Title	Album details	Certifications
Parkway Drive: The DVD	Released: 22 September 2009; Label: Resist; Epitaph; Formats: BR, DVD	ARIA: Platinum
Home Is for the Heartless	Released: 6 July 2012; Label: Resist; Epitaph; Formats: BR, DVD	ARIA: Platinum
Viva the Underdogs	Released: 27 March 2020; Label: Resist; Epitaph; Formats: BR, DL, DVD-V	

=== Split albums ===
List of split albums
Title	Album details
Split CD with I Killed the Prom Queen	Released: May 2003; Label: Final Prayer; Formats: CD
Parkway Drive / Think Straight / Shoot to Kill: What We've Built with Think Straight / Shoot to Kill	Released: July 2003; Label: Left For Dead Recordings; Formats: CD

== Extended plays ==
List of EPs
Title	EP details	Peak positions
Title	EP details	AUS
Don't Close Your Eyes	Released: 1 June 2004; Label: Resist; Formats: CD	32

== Singles ==
Year	Title	Peak chart positions Peak chart positions		Album
Year	Title	AUS	US Main	Album
2010	"Sleepwalker"	—	—	Deep Blue
2012	"Dark Days"	71	—	Atlas
2013	"Wild Eyes"	—	—	Atlas
2015	"Vice Grip"	95	19	Ire
2015	"Crushed"	—	—	Ire
2015	"The Sound of Violence"	—	—	Ire
2016	"Devil's Calling"	—	34	Ire
2016	"Bottom Feeder"	—	—	Ire
2018	"Wishing Wells"	—	—	Reverence
2018	"The Void"	—	18	Reverence
2018	"Prey"	—	27	Reverence
2019	"Shadow Boxing"	—	—	Reverence
2022	"Glitch"	—	26	Darker Still
2022	"The Greatest Fear"	—	—	Darker Still
2022	"Darker Still"	—	39	Darker Still
2023	"Imperial Heretic"	—	25	Darker Still
2025	"Sacred"	—	33	TBA

== Music videos ==
List of music videos, showing year released and director
Title	Year	Album	Director(s)	Link
"Smoke 'Em If Ya Got 'Em"	2006	Killing with a Smile	Unknown	
"Boneyards"	2007	Horizons	Eric Zunkley	
"Sleepwalker"	2010	Deep Blue	Winston McCall & Aaron Briggs	
"Karma"	2011	Deep Blue	Caleb Graham	
"Unrest"	2011	Deep Blue	Unknown	
"Dark Days"	2012	Atlas	Aaron Hymes	
"Wild Eyes"	2013	Atlas	Aaron Hymes	
"Vice Grip"	2015	Ire	Frankie Nasso	
"Crushed"	2015	Ire	Carlo Oppermann	
"Devil's Calling"	2016	Ire (Deluxe Edition)	Frankie Nasso	
"Bottom Feeder"	2016	Ire	Unknown	
"Wishing Wells"	2018	Reverence	Frankie Nasso	
"The Void"	2018	Reverence	Allan Hardy	
"Prey"	2018	Reverence	Neal Walters	
"Shadow Boxing"	2019	Reverence	Unknown	
"Glitch"	2022	Darker Still	Allan Hardy	
"The Greatest Fear"	2022	Darker Still	James Chappell	
"Sacred"	2025	Non-album single	Third Eye Visuals	
