= Leaton Rose =

Australian musician

- Born: Leaton John Rose
- Origin: Adelaide, South Australia, Australia
- Occupation: Musician
- Instrument: Bass guitar

Leaton John Rose is an Australian musician who has played bass guitar for Adelaide-based Metalcore band, I Killed the Prom Queen (2002–2003) and alternative rock band, the Hot Lies (2004–2010).

== Biography ==
Leaton John Rose grew up in Adelaide and was the bass guitarist for local group, Cur, in 2000. Fellow members were JJ Peters on drums and Jona Weinhofen on lead guitar – the group disbanded in early 2000. Metalcore, deathcore band I Killed the Prom Queen was founded later in 2000 by bass guitarist Ben Engel, guitarist Simon O'Gorman, drummer Peters, vocalist Lee Stacy and guitarist Weinhofen. The next year, Michael Crafter joined to share lead vocals; soon after Rose replaced Engel on bass guitar.

The band recorded a four track demo, Choose to Love, Live or Die, which was re-released in 2002 as an extended by Final Prayer Records. They also released a Split EP in 2003 featuring two songs by I Killed the Prom Queen ("Homicide Documentaries" and "Death Certificate for a Beauty Queen"). I Killed The Prom Queen's first release was the only one with Stacy's and Crafter's vocals. The tracks were early versions of those re-recorded for Your Past Comes Back to Haunt You. After the release of Choose to Love, Live Or Die, O'Gorman was replaced by Kevin Cameron and Stacy left.

Rose departed I Killed the Prom Queen and soon formed another Adelaide band, the Hot Lies, and Sean Kennedy took his place in I Killed the Prom Queen. The Hot Lies were an alternative rock band formed in 2004, with drummer Jared Brown, rhythm guitarist Benjamin Pix, Rose on bass guitar, lead guitarist Luke Szabo and lead vocalist Pete Wood. They released two EPs and a full-length album and disbanded early in 2010.
