= Shoreside =

Australian musical group

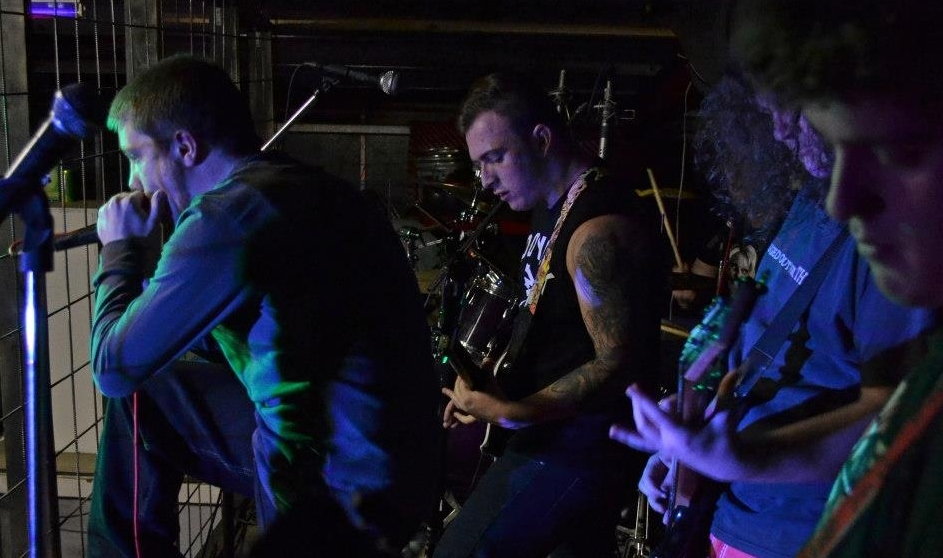
- Shoreside performing live at the Jam Tin, December 2012.

Background information
- Also known as: Convoluted Tides
- Origin: Hampton Park, Victoria, Australia
- Genres: Metalcore
- Years active: 2011–2014, 2019-Present
- Labels: Unsigned
- Members: Corey Burton; Christopher Di Carlo; Travis Clarke
- Past members: Michael Bujaki; Joshua Scott; Jason Anderson; John Kis Gyevi

Shoreside are a three-piece metalcore band from the south-eastern suburbs of Victoria, Australia. They have released one full-length album, one extended play and three demo recordings.

== Formation and Desolation (2011–2013) ==
Shoreside was originally a recording project founded by vocalist/songwriter Corey Burton at the beginning of 2011. Later joined by guitarist/songwriter Michael Bujaki (who had previously performed alongside Burton), the first complete lineup arrived in 2012. Shortly after this, drummer Joshua Scott departed and was replaced by Travis Clarke.

In early 2013 Shoreside announced a new album would be recorded and on 9 April, their debut album Desolation was independently released. It received mostly positive reviews.

== Burton's Departure and Split (2014–2019) ==
In March 2014, Burton announced his departure. As a result, Shoreside announced that their upcoming show on 4 July would be their last. Despite no longer being part of the group, Burton continued to perform alongside the band for all of their remaining shows.

== Reunion (since 2019) ==
In August 2019, Shoreside's social media accounts were reactivated and their lineup updated. In December, Burton shared a clip via social media of new Shoreside material, alongside the message "We're back".

== Musical style ==
Shoreside incorporate a variety of vocal styles including clean singing and screamed vocals. Their musical style has been described as taking inspiration from various metalcore giants such as August Burns Red, I Killed The Prom Queen, and most notably Parkway Drive, warranting reviews from multiple sources.

== Band members ==
=== Current members ===
- Corey Burton: Screamed Vocals (2011–2014, 2019–present)
- Christopher Di Carlo: Guitars & Backing Vocals (2012–2014, 2019–present)
- Travis Clarke: Drums & Clean Vocals (2012–2014, 2019–present)

=== Former members ===
- Michael Bujaki: Guitars & Clean Vocals (2011–2014)
- John Kis Gyevi – Bass Guitar (2012–2013)
- Jason Anderson: Bass Guitar (2013–2014)
- Joshua Scott – Drums (2012)

== Discography ==
Studio Albums

- Desolation (2013)

Extended Plays

- All Apologies (2012) (As Convoluted Tides)

Demos

- Demo (2011)
- Demo (2011) (As Convoluted Tides)
- Demo (2012) (As Convoluted Tides)
