= 50 Lions =

Australian hardcore band

- Origin: Byron Bay, New South Wales, Australia
- Genres: Hardcore punk, metalcore
- Years active: 2005–present
- Labels: Resist Records, Six Feet Under Records, Washed Up Records
- Members: Oscar McCall; Byron "Boz" Carney; Elmzy; Jonathan Niclair; Baina

50 Lions are an Australian hardcore band from Byron Bay, New South Wales. The band is named after a video poker machine of the same name.

== History ==
In 2005, they released their self-titled 7-inch EP, which sold out within 3 months of its release. Later that year, they released their debut album, Nowhere to Run, through Washed Up Records.

In 2006 they did a tour with Australian band I Killed the Prom Queen.

They then released Time Is the Enemy through Resist Records in 2007.

At the beginning of 2008, the band played alongside Parkway Drive in 14 out of 15 dates during the Surf Rat Tour. They have since released a split CD with American band Down to Nothing.

After their European tour, they will be doing a tour of Australia with Blacklisted, and then will be a part of the annual Hardcore festival in Sydney. 50 Lions vocalist Oscar McCall is the brother of Parkway Drive vocalist Winston McCall.

== Tours ==
Throughout their short career they have toured with bands such as Rise Against, Parkway Drive, I Killed the Prom Queen, Evergreen Terrace and Comeback Kid.

In November 2009, 50 Lions teamed up with Baltimore's Trapped Under Ice for a national tour of Australia. The tour will cover Adelaide, Melbourne, Canberra, Brisbane, Byron, Sydney and Perth. In January 2010, 50 Lions toured Australia nationally on the Boys of Summer 2010 Tour, supporting American metalcore band Every Time I Die. During the months from April to May 2010, 50 Lions toured Europe with Parkway Drive, Despised Icon, Winds of Plague and The Warriors.

== Members ==
- Oscar McCall – vocals
- Byron "Boz" Carney – bass
- Elmzy – guitars
- Baina – guitars
- Jonathan Niclair – drums

== Discography ==
=== Albums ===
Title	Details
Nowhere to Run	Released: 2006; Label: Washed Up Records (WUR007); Format: CD,
Time is the Enemy	Released: 2007; Label: Resist Records (RES065) / Demons Run Amok Entertainment (DRA026); Format: CD, digital download, LP
Where Life Expires	Released: 2009; Label: Resist Records (RES090); Format: CD, digital download, LP
New Reality	Released: 2025; Label: Last Ride Records; Format CD, digital download, LP

=== Extended plays ===
Title	Details
Demo	Released: 2005; Label: Washed Up Records; Format: LP
50 Lions	Released: 2009; Label: Resist Records (RES086); Format: LP
Pray for Nothing	Released: 2013; Label: Resist Records (RES117); Format: LP
Former Glory	Released: 2015; Label: Six Feet Under Records (SFU102); Format: LP

== Awards and nominations ==
=== AIR Awards ===
The Australian Independent Record Awards (commonly known informally as AIR Awards) is an annual awards night to recognise, promote and celebrate the success of Australia's Independent Music sector.

Year	Nominee / work	Award	Result
2010	Where Life Expire	Best Independent Hard Rock/Punk Album	Nominated
