= I Killed the Prom Queen / Parkway Drive: Split CD =

2003 split EP by Parkway Drive and I Killed the Prom Queen

Split CD

EP (split) by: I Killed the Prom Queen; Parkway Drive
- Released: May 2003
- Recorded: March 2003 (I Killed the Prom Queen); 26–27 April 2003 (Parkway Drive)
- Studio: Soundhouse Studios; Topcat Studio
- Genre: Metalcore
- Length: 16:03
- Label: Final Prayer
- Producer: Anj; I Killed the Prom Queen; Brad Wann

I Killed the Prom Queen chronology
Choose to Love, Live or Die (2002)	Split CD (2003)	When Goodbye Means Forever... (2003)

Parkway Drive chronology
Split CD (2003)	Don't Close Your Eyes (2004)

I Killed the Prom Queen / Parkway Drive or Split CD is a four-track split extended play released by Australian metalcore bands Parkway Drive and I Killed the Prom Queen in May 2003 on Final Prayer Records. The two tracks by Parkway Drive were later re-released as bonus tracks on the reissue version of their solo EP, Don't Close Your Eyes, in 2006. Split CD was Parkway Drive's first release, and I Killed the Prom Queen's second.

== Background ==
The origins of Split CD are explained in a documentary on Parkway Drive: The DVD which was released by Parkway Drive in 2009. I Killed the Prom Queen's then lead singer, Michael Crafter, was in Byron Bay at the time of Parkway Drive's first show at the local youth centre, and came along to watch. Crafter had travelled from Adelaide to visit his then-girlfriend in early 2003. In an interview on the DVD Crafter states:

This was like the first day I came to Byron, so I didn't really expect this band to be good. And then I heard them and was just like, "These are the biggest breakdowns ever", and I was just freaking out. Saw the first show ever, and I just couldn't believe it, it actually was just like, "I've got to get this band on something".

Jeff Ling, guitarist for Parkway Drive, recalled his first gig, "It was horrible. I was terrified. I won't pretend I was cool. I had never played in front of people and I never thought about what it would be like. I was onstage wearing board shorts and my socks pulled up. I was just clueless and I don't really think we played well." Nevertheless, after hearing that first show, Crafter asked Parkway Drive's members if they wanted to do a split extended play with his band and they accepted.

I Killed the Prom Queen's two tracks were recorded in March 2003 at Soundhouse Studios with Anj recording and co-producing with the group. Their line-up was Crafter on lead vocals; Kevin Cameron and Jona Weinhofen on guitars; Sean Kennedy on bass guitar; and JJ Peters on drums.

Parkway Drive's tracks were recorded on 26 and 27 April of that year at Topcat Studio by Brad Wann, they were mixed by Wann and the group on 3 May, also at Topcat. The line-up was Ling on guitar; Ben Gordon on drums; Luke Kilpatrick on guitar; Winston McCall on lead vocals; Brett Versteeg on bass guitar and vocals. It was released in May 2003. Following the release of this split EP, Parkway Drive and I Killed the Prom Queen toured together. When Parkway Drive returned to home base after the tour I Killed the Prom Queen's label, Resist Records, offered them a recording contract.

I Killed the Prom Queen issued live versions of both of this EP's tracks on Sleepless Nights and City Lights (November 2008), a live DVD/CD album. Parkway Drive's two tracks were reissued on a bonus disc on the extended version of Don't Close Your Eyes (2006). Recidivist of Metal Amino reviewed that album and observed, "The highlights being 'Swallowing Razorblades' and 'I Watched', both taken from their Split. Undoubtedly MUST Listen tracks especially 'Swallowing Razorblades'."

== Track listing ==
No.	Title	Writer(s)	Performers	Length
1.	"Homicide Documentaries"	Josef John Peters, Jona Weinhofen, Kevin Cameron, Sean Kennedy, Michael Crafter	I Killed the Prom Queen	4:07
2.	"Death Certificate of a Beauty Queen"	Peters, Weinhofen, Cameron, Kennedy, Crafter	I Killed the Prom Queen	4:13
3.	"I Watched"	Jeff Ling, Ben Gordon, Winston McCall, Luke Kilpatrick, Brett Versteeg	Parkway Drive	3:29
4.	"Swallowing Razorblades"	Ling, Gordon, McCall, Kilpatrick, Versteeg	Parkway Drive	4:14
Total length:				16:03

== Personnel ==
Credits:

I Killed the Prom Queen (tracks 1, 2)

- Michael Crafter – lead vocals
- Jona Weinhofen – lead guitar, vocals, keyboards
- Kevin Cameron – rhythm guitar
- Sean Kennedy – bass
- JJ Peters – drums

Parkway Drive (tracks 3, 4)

- Winston McCall – lead vocals
- Jeff Ling – lead guitar
- Luke "Pig" Kilpatrick – rhythm guitar
- Brett "Lagg" Versteeg – bass, clean vocals
- Ben "Gaz" Gordon – drums

Additional personnel

- Anj (tracks 1, 2), I Killed the Prom Queen (tracks 1, 2), Brad Wann (tracks 3, 4) – production
- Brad Wann (tracks 3, 4), Parkway Drive (tracks 3, 4) – mixing
