= Choose to Love, Live or Die =

EP by I Killed the Prom Queen
- Released: 2002
- Recorded: late 2001 – early 2002; Padmuse Recordings
- Genre: Metalcore
- Length: 13:39
- Label: 618
- Producer: Paul Degasperi, I Killed the Prom Queen

I Killed the Prom Queen chronology
| Choose to Love, Live or Die (2002) | I Killed the Prom Queen / Parkway Drive: Split CD (2003) |

Choose to Love, Live or Die is a four-track EP by Australian metalcore band, I Killed the Prom Queen, which was released in 2002. By September that year the title track was recommended listening on Three D Radio.

The original line-up of I Killed the Prom Queen consisted of vocalist Lee Stacy, guitarist Jona Weinhofen, drummer Josef Peters, bass guitarist Ben Engel and second guitarist Simon O'Gorman. The following year Michael Crafter, now synonymous with I Killed the Prom Queen and Australian Hardcore, joined the group to share the vocal duties. Soon after this Leaton Rose, now of the band The Hot Lies, replaced Engel on bass. The group then recorded a four track demo which would become Choose to Love, Live or Die. This demo was later re-released as an EP by Final Prayer Records.

Three tracks, "Choose to Love Live or Die", "Dreams as Hearts Bleed" and "The Paint Brush Killer", were re-recorded for the band's third EP Your Past Comes Back to Haunt You (March 2005). Some of its tracks appear on the group's live album CD/DVD, Sleepless Nights and City Lights, which was issued in November 2008.

== Reception ==
Sputnikmusic's reviewer, praised Choose to Love, Live or Die for "The way everything ties in together is amazing. How Crafter's then high donkey sounding vocals and Lee's seagull scream go well together just like peas and carrots. The production is a bit empty but everything is there and crystal clear". Australian punk website reviewed the group in 2004 and described their debut EP as "Fusing elements of rock, metal and hardcore, they knock you to the floor with a 4-track-musical-offensive. Before you know it, they're picking you up again with emotive, vocal and guitar-driven melody, just to knock you right back down".

== Track listing ==
All tracks written by I Killed the Prom Queen:

1. "Choose to Love, Live or Die" - 2:54
2. "The Paint Brush Killer" - 3:40
3. "Dream as Hearts Bleed" - 2:47
4. "Upon a Rivers Sky" - 4:18

Michael Crafter explained on the DVD version of Sleepless Nights and City Lights, that the group had recorded a fifth track for the EP. But, it was accidentally deleted from the computer in the studio they were using, so they decided to stick with just four.

== Personnel ==
Credited to:

I Killed the Prom Queen members

- Lee Stacy – vocals
- Michael Crafter – vocals
- Jona Weinhofen – guitar, backing vocals on "The Paint Brush Killer" and "Upon a Rivers Sky"
- Simon O'Gorman – guitar, backing vocals
- Leaton Rose – bass guitar
- J. J. Peters – drums

Additional musicians

- Cain Kapetanakis – guitar

Production work

- Producer – Paul Degasperi, I Killed the Prom Queen
- Engineer – Paul Degasperi
- Mixer – Paul Degasperi, I Killed the Prom Queen
- Mastering – Joseph Carra
- Studios – Padmuse Recordings (recording), Crystal Mastering (mastering)
