= Don't Close Your Eyes (EP) =

- Cover for the original 2004 release

Studio album by Parkway Drive
- Released: 1 June 2004; 2006 (reissue)
- Studios: Modern Music Studios, Brisbane, QLD; Topcat Studios, Alstonville, NSW
- Genre: Metalcore
- Length: 26:19; 45:27 (re-release)
- Labels: Golf; Resist

Parkway Drive chronology
I Killed the Prom Queen / Parkway Drive (2003)	Don't Close Your Eyes (2004)	Killing with a Smile (2005)

Don't Close Your Eyes is an album by Australian metalcore band Parkway Drive, released on 1 June 2004. It was later re-released with the addition of tracks included from both their split album with I Killed the Prom Queen and from the compilation albums What We've Built and True Till Death, Volume I. Two songs, "Smoke 'Em If Ya Got 'Em" and "Hollow Man", were re-recorded and released on Parkway Drive's debut album Killing with a Smile and 2010 album Deep Blue, respectively. "Hollow Man" is released as just "Hollow" on Deep Blue, and features Marshall Lichtenwaldt, the vocalist of American hardcore punk band the Warriors.

This is the band's last release with bassist Brett "Lagg" Versteeg.

== Track listing ==
All tracks are written by Parkway Drive (Winston McCall, Jeff Ling, Luke Kilpatrick, Benjamin Gordon and Brett Versteegh) except where noted.

Don't Close Your Eyes
No.	Title	Writer(s)	Length
1.	"..." (taken from the movie The End of Evangelion)		1:12
2.	"Smoke 'Em If Ya Got 'Em"	McCall, Ling, Kilpatrick, Gordon	3:45
3.	"Dead Dreams"		3:20
4.	"Flesh, Bone and Weakness"		5:13
5.	"The Cruise"		1:56
6.	"You're Over"		3:16
7.	"Looks Like Yoda"		2:55
8.	"Don't Close Your Eyes"		4:42
Total length:			26:19

2006 re-release bonus tracks
No.	Title	Length
9.	"I Watched" (taken from the split CD)	3:29
10.	"Swallowing Razorblades" (taken from the split CD)	4:14
11.	"Emotional Breakdown" (taken from What We've Built)	2:32
12.	"Hollow Man" (taken from What We've Built)	2:22
13.	"The Negotiator" (taken from What We've Built)	3:39
14.	"Hopeless" (taken from True Till Death, Volume I)	2:52
Total length:		45:27

== Personnel ==
Parkway Drive

- Winston McCall – lead vocals
- Jeff Ling – lead guitar
- Luke "Pig" Kilpatrick – rhythm guitar
- Brett "Lagg" Versteeg – bass guitar, clean vocals on tracks 4 and 10
- Ben "Gaz" Gordon – drums

Additional musicians

- Jessica Turman – guest vocals

Additional personnel

- Stuart Nevin – mixing (tracks 1–8)
- Brad Wann – mixing (tracks 9–14)
- William Bowden – re-mastering
- Ash Pederick – graphic design
- Andian Martin – photography

== Charts ==
Chart performance for Don't Close Your Eyes
Chart (2023)	Peak position
Australian Albums (ARIA)	32
German Albums (Offizielle Top 100)	72
