= Death certificate (disambiguation) =

Death certificate, a document concerning a person's death

Death certificate may refer to:

- Death Certificate (album), an album by rapper Ice Cube
- "Death Certificate for a Beauty Queen", a single by metal band I Killed the Prom Queen
