= Your Past Comes Back to Haunt You =

EP by I Killed the Prom Queen
- Released: March 7, 2005
- Genre: Metalcore
- Length: 23:52
- Label: Resist Records
- Producer: Dan Jones

I Killed the Prom Queen chronology
When Goodbye Means Forever... (2004)	Your Past Comes Back to Haunt You (2005)	Music for the Recently Deceased (2006)

Your Past Comes Back to Haunt You is the second EP released by Australian metalcore band I Killed the Prom Queen in 2005. It is also the last album to feature Michael Crafter on vocals, besides the re-issue of Music for the Recently Deceased. The EP features a reworked version of "To Be Sleeping While Still Standing" which was originally done by an earlier band including Crafter and Weinhofen called The Fall of Troy. It also includes three tracks form their first EP, Choose to Love, Live or Die, along with two new songs, "Never Never Land" and "You're Not Worth Saving". Some of its tracks appear on the group's live album CD/DVD, Sleepless Nights and City Lights, which was issued in November 2008.

== Reception ==
Aidan Quinn of PunkHardCore website noted that the EP's "quality here is hit and miss really. The unreleased songs are blistering – some of the best stuff the band have written... On the contrary, the rerecorded versions of [earlier tracks] ... are horrible". Ultimate-Guitar.Com's reviewer felt their usual "style of screaming in the verse and singing on the chorus makes them an awesome band" as the group "were starting to make an imprint on the Australian hardcore scene and this album really set them out in the field".

== Track listing ==
1. "Never Never Land" - 3:09
2. "Choose To Love Live Or Die" - 3:06
3. "You're Not Worth Saving" - 1:29
4. "Dreams As Hearts Bleed" - 3:13
5. "To Be Sleeping While Still Standing" - 4:04
6. "The Paint Brush Killer" - 8:48

Notes:

- The sound clip at the beginning of "Never Never Land" is from the 1996 movie The Rock.
- The last track, "The Paint Brush Killer", contains a hidden track after four minutes of silence entitled "Fast Food Jam".

== Personnel ==
- Michael Crafter – vocals
- Jona Weinhofen – guitar, keyboards, vocals on "The Paint Brush Killer"
- Kevin Cameron – guitar
- Sean Kennedy – bass
- J. J. Peters – drums
