= Beloved (I Killed the Prom Queen album) =

Studio album by I Killed the Prom Queen
- Released: 14 February 2014
- Recorded: 2013
- Studio: Studio Fredman, Gothenburg, Sweden
- Genre: Metalcore
- Length: 37:44
- Label: Epitaph
- Producer: Fredrik Nordström

I Killed the Prom Queen chronology
Sleepless Nights and City Lights (2008)	Beloved (2014)

Singles from Beloved
- 1. "Memento Vivere" Released: August 21, 2012; 2. "To the Wolves" Released: December 3, 2013; 3. "Thirty One & Sevens" Released: January 14, 2014; 4. "Bright Enough" Released: July 22, 2014; 5. "Calvert Street" Released: October 28, 2014

Beloved is the third and final full-length studio album by Australian metalcore band I Killed the Prom Queen. It was released in Australia on 14 February 2014 and in US on 18 February 2014. The album was streamed on Alternative Press's website on 5 February 2014.

This is the first album from the band since its reformation along with three new members, Jamie Hope (vocals), Shane O'Brien (drums) and Benjamin Coyte (bass).

Three music videos were released for "Bright Enough", "Thirty One & Sevens" and "Calvert Street"

== Critical reception ==
Professional ratings
Review scores
Source	Rating
About.com	3/5 stars
AllMusic	3.5/5 stars
Alternative Press	4/5 stars
AMH Network	5/5 stars
Kill Your Stereo	8/10 stars
The Music.com.au	3.5/5 stars
Rock Sound	8/10 stars

At Alternative Press, Dan Slessor rated the album four stars out of five stars, stating that "the finished product more than justifies the wait." Andrew Kapper of About.com concluded that "Beloved is without doubt a strong comeback for the band, but it does have a couple of weak points in the armor, both of which fall into the same category. The lack of big anthems will probably make the album uneventful for casual fans, while the heavier parts rely on the same format and almost become indistinguishable from one another." However, Rock Sound were very positive about the album, writing that "Beloved is both a reincarnation of old and a lesson in modern metalcore that makes IKTPQ the oldest newcomers to stake their claim for 2014." Kill Your Stereo described the album as "a bold declaration of forward momentum while doing classic I Killed the Prom Queen the way only they know how."

== Track listing ==
No.	Title	Length
1.	"Beginning of the End"	1:47
2.	"To the Wolves"	3:21
3.	"Bright Enough"	3:48
4.	"Melior"	3:40
5.	"Thirty One & Sevens"	3:25
6.	"Calvert Street" (featuring Björn Strid of Soilwork)	3:30
7.	"Kjærlighet"	3:46
8.	"The Beaten Path"	3:27
9.	"Nightmares"	3:02
10.	"No One Will Save Us" (featuring Jonathan Vigil of The Ghost Inside)	2:58
11.	"Brevity"	5:08
Total length:		37:44

Deluxe edition
No.	Title	Length
1.	"Beginning of the End"	1:47
2.	"To the Wolves"	3:21
3.	"Bright Enough"	3:48
4.	"Melior"	3:40
5.	"Thirty One & Sevens"	3:25
6.	"Calvert Street" (featuring Björn Strid of Soilwork)	3:30
7.	"Kjærlighet"	3:46
8.	"The Beaten Path"	3:27
9.	"Billions" (bonus track)	3:55
10.	"Nightmares"	3:02
11.	"No One Will Save Us" (featuring Jonathan Vigil of The Ghost Inside)	2:58
12.	"Memento Vivere" (bonus track)	3:51
13.	"Sparrowhawk" (bonus track)	3:56
14.	"Brevity"	5:08
Total length:		49:56

== Personnel ==
I Killed the Prom Queen

- Jamie Hope – vocals
- Jona Weinhofen – guitar, clean vocals on "Bright Enough", "Thirty One & Sevens", "Kjærlighet", "Nightmares", "Sparrowhawk", and "Brevity", additional orchestral arrangements on "Kjærlighet", "Melior" and "Brevity"
- Kevin Cameron – guitar
- Benjamin Coyte – bass
- Shane O'Brien – drums

Additional personnel

- Bjorn "Speed" Strid – additional production, clean vocals on "Calvert Street"
- Ettore Rigotti – keyboard, programming and orchestral arrangements at The Metal House Studio
- Christoffer Franzen of Lights & Motion – additional guitars, keyboard and programming on "Beginning of the End", "Kjærlighet", and "Brevity"
- Randy Slaugh – live string sessions production and engineering
- Ken Dudley at Cottonwood Studios – string sessions mixing
- Sarah Abbott – violin
- Doug Ferry – violin
- Sara Bauman – violin
- Amanda Cox – viola
- Julie Slaugh – viola
- Sydney Howard – viola
- Joseph Woodward – cello
- Isaac Hales – cello
- Jakob Printzlau – album art
