= Music for the Recently Deceased =

Studio album by I Killed the Prom Queen
- Released: 14 November 2006
- Recorded: September 2005, January–February 2006
- Studios: Studio Fredman, Gothenburg, Sweden
- Genre: Melodic metalcore
- Length: 42:03
- Label: Metal Blade
- Producers: Fredrik Nordström, Patrik J. Sten

I Killed the Prom Queen chronology
Your Past Comes Back to Haunt You (2005)	Music for the Recently Deceased (2006)	Sleepless Nights and City Lights (2008)

Singles from Music for the Recently Deceased
- 1. "Say Goodbye" Released: February 28, 2007

Professional ratings
Review scores
Source	Rating
Allmusic	3/5 stars
Loud Magazine	(55%)
Punknews.org	4/5 stars
Scenepointblank	(4.7/10)

Music for the Recently Deceased is the second studio album by Australian metalcore band I Killed the Prom Queen that was released on 14 November 2006.

In August 2005, I Killed the Prom Queen flew to Sweden to record their follow-up album, Music for the Recently Deceased. By late 2005, they had completed recording the album but in January 2006 vocalist Michael Crafter was fired. Instead of releasing the album as it was, they decided to hire a new vocalist and replace Crafter's tracks. Ed Butcher, from United Kingdom band The Hunt for Ida Wave was recruited. New lyrics were written by Cameron and Butcher, while some lyrics that the whole band had contributed during the Crafter sessions were retained. Music for the Recently Deceased was produced by Fredrik Nordström, whose other credits included Dimmu Borgir, Darkest Hour, At the Gates and In Flames, and by Patrik J. Sten. The album was released on 31 July 2006 by Stomp Entertainment and peaked at #27 on the Australian ARIA Charts. In the first month of its release in the United States the album sold 1,238 copies. A video was produced for the song "Say Goodbye"

== Re-releases ==
On 19 May 2008 a Tour Edition of the album was released with the additions of 2 live songs recorded at the Sydney Deadfest, 4 songs featuring Michael Crafter on vocals and the music video for Say Goodbye. The tour edition was limited to 5,000 individually hand-numbered copies. Recently the limited edition was released additionally to the 5000 original copies.

On 20 May 2011 a 2-CD version of the album was released to coincide with the band's reformation and 2011 Australian tour. The first disc contained the previously official release version with Ed Butcher's vocals, and the second disc featured the original version with Michael Crafter singing. The Crafter version was previously unreleased, with a few tracks leaking in the past. This version was released on a new label, We Are Unified, because the band's previous label, Stomp Entertainment, had gone bankrupt and stopped production and distribution on all its releases.

== Track listing ==
No.	Title	Lyrics	Music	Length
1.	"Sharks in Your Mouth"	Butcher	Weinhofen	4:04
2.	"Say Goodbye"	Butcher, Cameron	Weinhofen	4:14
3.	"€666"	Cameron	Cameron	3:39
4.	"Your Shirt Would Look Better with a Columbian Neck-tie"	Butcher, Cameron	Weinhofen, Cameron	3:50
5.	"The Deepest Sleep"	Butcher, Cameron	Weinhofen	3:38
6.	"Bet It All on Black"	Butcher, Cameron	Cameron	4:15
7.	"Headfirst from a Hangman's Noose"	Butcher	Cameron	4:05
8.	"Sleepless Nights and City Lights"	Butcher	Cameron, Weinhofen	3:34
9.	"Slain Upon My Faithful Sword"	Butcher	Weinhofen	4:08
10.	"Like Nails to a Casket"	Cameron	Cameron	4:06
11.	"There Will Be No Violins When You Die"	instrumental	Weinhofen	2:27

Tour Edition bonus tracks
No.	Title	Length
12.	"Sharks in Your Mouth" (live)	4:46
13.	"Your Shirt Would Look Better with a Columbian Neck-tie" (live)	3:43
14.	"Sharks in Your Mouth" (feat. Michael Crafter on vocals)	4:04
15.	"Say Goodbye" (feat. Michael Crafter on vocals)	4:14
16.	"€666" (feat. Michael Crafter on vocals)	3:39
17.	"Like Nails to a Casket" (feat. Michael Crafter on vocals)	4:06
18.	"Say Goodbye" (music video)	4:17

== Personnel ==
I Killed the Prom Queen

- Ed Butcher – vocals
- Jona Weinhofen – guitar, keyboards, vocals on "Say Goodbye", "Your Shirt Would Look Better with a Columbian Neck-tie", "The Deepest Sleep", "Headfirst from a Hangman's Noose" and "Slain Upon My Faithful Sword"
- Kevin Cameron – guitar
- Sean Kennedy – bass
- J. J. Peters – drums

Additional personnel

- Sons of Nero - artwork

=== Trivia ===
- The lyrics, "...Every living thing on this earth dies alone"; that phrase has never sounded so sweet to my ears...", from the song "€666", is a loose reference to a line from the film Donnie Darko.
- The song title "€666" was a band in-joke at the studio hire price when converted from Australian dollars into euros.
- The album name is a reference to the movie Beetlejuice, in which there is a book titled 'Handbook for the Recently Deceased'.

== Charts ==
Chart (2006–08)	Peak position
Australian Albums (ARIA Charts)	27
