= Horizons (Parkway Drive album) =

Studio album by Parkway Drive
- Released: 6 October 2007
- Recorded: May 2007
- Studios: Zing Studios, Westfield, Massachusetts
- Genre: Metalcore
- Length: 38:35
- Labels: Resist; Epitaph
- Producer: Adam Dutkiewicz

Parkway Drive chronology
Killing with a Smile (2005)	Horizons (2007)	Deep Blue (2010)

Horizons is the second studio album by Australian metalcore band Parkway Drive. It was released on 6 October 2007 through Resist and Epitaph Records, and was produced by Adam Dutkiewicz. It was recorded in Westfield, Massachusetts at Zing Studios in May 2007. The record was a surprising commercial success for the band at the time, charting at #6 on the ARIA Album Charts, a notable achievement for an Australian metal band in 2007. A music video was filmed for its sixth track, "Boneyards".

It was cited as the band's best album by Bryan Rolli of Loudwire in 2025.

== Background and recording ==
Recording took place at Zing Studios, Westfield, Massachusetts in the United States in May 2007. Adam Dutkiewicz of Killswitch Engage acted as producer. Discussing the recording process, McCall explained: "The songs, the sounds, the speed, the heaviness and the production has all been stepped up. Working with Adam again made our job super easy as well as highly enjoyable."

== Music and lyrics ==
A metalcore album, Horizons contains elements of thrash metal and melodic death metal in its instrumentation. According to Bryan Rolli of Loudwire: "There are two tiers of breakdowns on Parkway Drive’s sophomore album: low, and reeeaaaalllyyyy loooowwwww. These binary breakdowns make maximum impact across Horizons, but the Australian metalcore veterans offset their chug-a-thon with furious thrash drumming, melodic death metal riffs and incendiary sweep-picked solos." Revolver described the track "Carrion" as "essentially a power ballad that pushes the definition of that songwriting archetype to its mightiest iteration." The album contains no clean vocals.

The album's lyrics have drawn comparisons to emo music. According to a staff reviewer at Punknews.org: "The 2007 conceptualization that aligns more with an image and an emotionally burdened message is absolutely present. And with lyrics like, "Still I'm choking on the words I should have said one thousand times [...] And I'm cursing every memory [...] And I'm holding on until there's nothing left to save [...] Let every scar still bear your name [...] Every scar still bears an angel's face," there's little room to contest such an association."

== Release and promotion ==
In July and August 2007, Parkway Drive appeared on that year's Warped Tour in the US. On 24 July 2007, Horizons was announced for release, and its track listing was revealed. On 20 August, "Boneyards" was posted on the band's Myspace profile. Horizons was made available for streaming on 1 October, and was released on 6 October through Epitaph. In October, the band toured across Australia, before going on tour in Europe with Comeback Kid, Cancer Bats, the Warriors, and This Is Hell the following month. A music video for "Boneyards" was posted online on 23 November. In December, the band went on a west coast US tour alongside XDeathstarx. In January and February 2008, the band went on a US tour alongside Killswitch Engage, the Dillinger Escape Plan and Every Time I Die. Following this, the band performed at the Groezrock festival in Belgium, and went on an Australian tour with Have Heart, Antagonist and Break Even. In July and August, the band supported Darkest Hour on the Trash & Burn tour. During the tour, the band performed at Robot Mosh Fest. In February 2009, the band played a few shows in China. In April and May 2009, the band went on a tour of the US with Stick to Your Guns and MyChildren MyBride. The band appeared at The Bamboozle and West coast Riot festivals in May and June 2009, respectively. After this, they performed at With Full Force festival in Germany in July 2009. They then toured Australia in August 2009, with support from August Burns Red and Architects. In September and October 2009, the band went on a US tour with A Day to Remember, In Fear and Faith and I See Stars.

== Critical reception and legacy ==
Professional ratings
Review scores
Source	Rating
AllMusic	2.5/5 stars
Punknews.org	2.5/5 stars
Rock Hard	8/10

The album received mixed reviews from critics. AllMusic stated "Horizons is strictly by the book metalcore, but delivered with enough talent and passion to put across a set of songs that might easily come off as samey and dull in less capable hands." It has been cited as a landmark in the metalcore genre, as well as one of the greatest of all time in the genre.

== Commercial performance ==
It reached #6 on the ARIA Albums Chart on 14 October 2007 and #27 on the US Top Heatseekers chart.

== Track listing ==
All tracks are written by Winston McCall, Jeff Ling, Luke Kilpatrick, and Benjamin Gordon, except where noted; credited to Parkway Drive.

No.	Title	Length
1.	"Begin"	0:49
2.	"The Sirens' Song"	3:09
3.	"Feed Them to the Pigs"	2:33
4.	"Carrion"	3:10
5.	"Five Months"	4:04
6.	"Boneyards"	3:14
7.	"Idols and Anchors"	3:50
8.	"Moments in Oblivion"	1:44
9.	"Breaking Point"	3:37
10.	"Dead Man's Chest"	3:22
11.	"Frostbite"	3:32
12.	"Horizons"	5:35
Total length:		38:35

== Personnel ==
Credits are adapted from the album liner notes.

Parkway Drive

- Winston McCall – lead vocals
- Jeff Ling – lead guitar
- Luke "Pig" Kilpatrick – rhythm guitar
- Jia "Pie" O'Connor – bass
- Ben "Gaz" Gordon – drums

Additional musicians

- Slo-Han Tu-Dix – guitar solo on "Breaking Point" (Note: Slo-Han Tu-Dix is a humorous pseudonym used for a guest guitarist on the album Horizons (2007) by the Australian metalcore band Parkway Drive. He is officially credited for performing the guitar solo on the album's ninth track, "Breaking Point." The name is a phonetic pun in English, sounding like "Slow hand, two dicks," an inside joke typical of the band's sense of humor in their early years. Although listed in the album credits and on platforms like Genius and Discogs, the true identity behind the solo remains a mystery, or perhaps an alias for one of the band members (such as Jeff Ling) or a close friend.)
- Pete Abordi (No Apologies, Last Nerve) – guest vocals on "Dead Man's Chest" (Note: Abordi is the lead vocalist in the Australian hardcore punk band No Apologies; his appearance on "Dead Man's Chest" is treated as if he was an officially noted featured guest on digital retailers' tracklists.)

Additional personnel

- Adam Dutkiewicz – production, engineering, mixing
- Tom Baker – mastering
- Jim "Labs" Fogarty – assistant engineering
- Switzerland Design – art direction, design
- Gordon Ball – cover art, photography
- Ben Pobjoy – photography
- Glennie Whittall – illustration

== Charts ==
Chart (2007)	Peak position
Australian Albums (ARIA)	6
US Heatseekers Albums (Billboard)	27

== Certifications ==
Certifications for Horizons
Region	Certification	Certified units/sales
Australia (ARIA)	Gold	35,000^{‡}
^{‡} Sales+streaming figures based on certification alone.
