= Killing with a Smile =

Studio album by Parkway Drive
- Released: 12 September 2005
- Recorded: May 2005
- Studios: Zing Studios, Westfield, Massachusetts, U.S.
- Genre: Metalcore
- Length: 39:42
- Labels: Resist; Epitaph
- Producer: Adam Dutkiewicz

Parkway Drive chronology
Don't Close Your Eyes (2004)	Killing with a Smile (2005)	Horizons (2007)

Killing with a Smile is the debut studio album by Australian metalcore band Parkway Drive. It was released on 12 September 2005 through Resist and Epitaph Records, and was produced by Adam Dutkiewicz. It was recorded in May 2005, over a period of just two weeks. It is the only album to feature bassist Shaun Cash.

== Release and promotion ==
It released in September 2005 in Australia through Resist Records. They supported Evergreen Terrace on their headlining Australian tour in January 2006. The album was released in September 2006 in the U.S. through Epitaph Records. A video was produced for "Smoke 'Em If Ya Got 'Em".

In October and November, the group went on the 2006 international edition of the Taste of Chaos tour, visiting New Zealand, Australia, Japan and Europe. From early July to early August, the band went on the 2007 edition of Warped Tour.

== Critical reception ==
Professional ratings
Review scores
Source	Rating
About.com	3.5/5 stars
AbsolutePunk	90%
AllMusic	3/5 stars
Punknews.org	0.5/5 stars

Since its release, Killing with a Smile has received mixed to positive reviews.

AbsolutePunk was very positive of the album, calling it a "true genre-defining" record. The reviewer praised the songs' structures, despite there being no defined verses or choruses. About.com reviewer Chad Bower was less positive about the album, but said "It's a very solid debut, and if you're a metalcore fan this is one worth checking out." He was slightly critical of the album's lyrics for being "a little on the emo side", but said the "angry vocals" cover it up pretty well.

AllMusic reviewer Corey Apar gave a mixed review of the album. He mainly noted how the album's lyrics deal with broken hearts and "just how pissed off they really are", citing "Romance is Dead" as "lyrical treasure". He concluded his review by comparing the band to Bleeding Through and "it just depends on where personal opinions currently stand on the necessity of another metalcore act".

Punknews.org reviewer Matt Whelihan was very critical of the album, calling it generic. Whelihan said the album "is a mindless affair that is unable to avoid any of metalcore's pitfalls. Parkway Drive could have created a picture of metalcore as they see it, but instead they were content to trace the works of those who came before."

== In popular culture ==
The name for the song "Guns for Show, Knives for a Pro" is a quote from the film, Lock, Stock and Two Smoking Barrels.

Australian surf group the Bra Boys featured four songs from the album in the documentary film Bra Boys: Blood Is Thicker than Water, the songs featured are "Gimme a D", "Anasasis (Xenophontis)", "Mutiny" and "It's Hard to Speak Without a Tongue". The songs were all released on the soundtrack except for "It's Hard to Speak Without a Tongue".

== Track listing ==
All tracks are written by Winston McCall, Jeff Ling, Luke Kilpatrick, Benjamin Gordon (credited to Parkway Drive).

No.	Title	Length
1.	"Gimme a D"	3:31
2.	"Anasasis (Xenophontis)"	3:31
3.	"Pandora"	3:58
4.	"Romance Is Dead"	5:18
5.	"Guns for Show, Knives for a Pro" (contains sound clips from Die Hard 2)	2:44
6.	"Blackout"	2:43
7.	"Picture Perfect, Pathetic"	2:44
8.	"It's Hard to Speak Without a Tongue"	4:14
9.	"Mutiny" (contains sound clips from Pirates of the Caribbean: The Curse of the Black Pearl)	3:17
10.	"Smoke 'Em If You Got 'Em" (re-recorded version)	3:40
11.	"A Cold Day in Hell"	4:01
Total length:		39:42

== Personnel ==
Credits are adapted from the album liner notes.

Parkway Drive

- Winston McCall – lead vocals
- Jeff Ling – lead guitar
- Luke "Pig" Kilpatrick – rhythm guitar
- Shaun "Cashy" Cash – bass
- Ben "Gaz" Gordon –drums

Additional personnel

- Adam Dutkiewicz – production, engineering, mixing
- Waynus Krupa – assistant engineering
- Steve Smart and Tom Baker – mastering
- Graham Nixon – management
- Asterik Studio – art direction, design
- Jerad Knudsen – photography

== Chart performance ==
Chart (2005)	Peak position
Australian Albums (ARIA)	39

== Certifications ==
Certifications for Killing with a Smile
Region	Certification	Certified units/sales
Australia (ARIA)	Gold	35,000^{‡}
^{‡} Sales+streaming figures based on certification alone.

== Release history ==
Region	Date	Label	Format	Catalog #
Australia	12 September 2005	Resist	Compact Disc	RES045
EU	21 August 2006	Epitaph	Compact Disc	86824
US	22 August 2006	Epitaph	Compact Disc	86824
