= Michael Crafter =

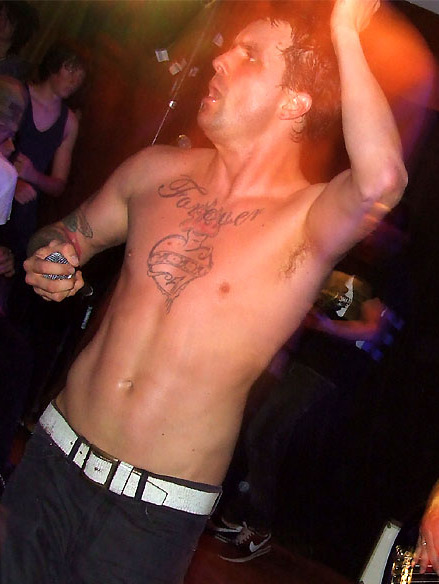
- Crafter in 2003

Background information
- Born: Michael Crafter
- Genres: Metalcore, hardcore punk
- Occupations: Musician; singer; songwriter; entertainment manager
- Instrument: Vocals
- Member of: I Killed the Prom Queen, Confession
- Formerly of: Carpathian, Bury Your Dead, xAll it Cost Was Everythingx

Michael Crafter is an Australian singer, songwriter and entertainment manager. His music career began as lead vocalist for I Killed the Prom Queen.

Crafter is the vocalist of Confession, and formerly fronted Carpathian and Bury Your Dead. He also founded the Mistake clothing label, tattoo shops and the Broken Glass Online forum.

== Biography ==
Crafter is a vocalist and music manager in the Australian metalcore scene and lives a straight edge lifestyle. Crafter made a brief appearance on Big Brother Australia after being voted in by the public through an online voting process via the Big Brother website. He was evicted after three days, claiming his eviction was planned due to I Killed the Prom Queen's Say Goodbye Tour.

Crafter appeared in the 2009 documentary Parkway Drive: The DVD, providing commentary on the metal act Parkway Drive. He provides background on the band and explains their beginnings in Byron Bay. Crafter is also seen performing a stage dive during the closing breakdown to "Boneyards" during the band's live set.

In 2016 Crafter announced he ended his music career to move onto business ventures in Perth, Western Australia. However, in 2020 he resumed recording, and later touring, with Confession.

Crafter returned to I Killed the Prom Queen when they reunited in 2025.

== Music career ==
=== I Killed the Prom Queen (2000–2006, 2008) ===
Crafter was the vocalist for I Killed the Prom Queen from 2000 to 2006. He then reformed with I Killed the Prom Queen after the breakup in 2008 to do what was marketed as their last Australian tour. The 2008 Australian Tour edition of the band's second album Music For the Recently Deceased features several bonus songs with vocals recorded by Crafter for the songs "Sharks in Your Mouth", "Say Goodbye", "€666" and "Like Nails to a Casket". The 2011 re-release contained a disc featuring all 11 tracks with his vocals. These vocals were recorded during Crafter's original tenure with the band shortly before he was fired during the recording of the album.

In 2018, I Killed the Prom Queen announced they would be reuniting with their 'classic lineup' (featuring Crafter) for a one-off performance at the 2019 Unify Gathering festival, for the 15th anniversary of their debut album When Goodbye Means Forever. Two days later, Unify cancelled the band's appearance due the unearthing of an "offensive" Facebook comment made two years prior by Crafter about gender equality in festival lineups. Crafter apologised for the comment and fans launched a petition to have the band re-added to the line-up, although Unify did not reverse the decision.

=== Carpathian (2006) ===
Crafter joined Carpathian in 2006 shortly after the release of their debut album Nothing to Lose. After seven months, he parted ways with them in February 2007. Despite rumours to the contrary, he never performed on any of their recordings.

=== Bury Your Dead (2007) ===
In March 2007 Crafter was recruited as the new vocalist for the American band Bury Your Dead, but left mid-tour in May 2007, citing "homesickness" at the time. He later revealed that the "chaos" and "psycho" environment that surrounded the band contributed to his departure. Crafter said there were "crazy, big fights every night" at the band's shows, and that the band members also regularly got into fights, including with each other. The frontman added that the tense and violent gang culture that surrounded the band and their associates, who were all heavily armed, made touring "awkward".

=== Confession (2008–2016) ===
Crafter formed the band Confession in 2008, with members from Brisbane, Melbourne, Adelaide and Byron Bay, New South Wales Australia.

In 2008 Confession released an EP on Resist Records titled Can't Live, Can't Breathe. In 2009 the band dropped their debut album Cancer, which earned the Australian Album of the Year Award. Their second album The Long Way Home was released in late 2011.

During the Cancer era, Kevin Cameron of I Killed the Prom Queen replaced Hiroshima Will Burn guitarist Tyrone Burke temporarily in the Confession lineup at this time. After Cameron's short stint with Confession, Dan Brown went back to playing guitar in the band and made way for Jamie Hope of The Red Shore to fill in on bass for the Keeping it Bogan tour before Byron Carney of 50 Lions was announced as the new bass player. However, Byron's stay with Confession was short lived and Dan went back to bass for a while and Confession played as a four-piece until they recruited former The Red Shore bassist Tim Anderson. The Long Way Home tour was relatively successful, and showcased Confession's new lineup.

In 2012, Confession members took control of the band's social media accounts and announced Crafter had been kicked out, without informing him prior to the announcement. The band's Facebook page listed Dan Brown, Shane O'Brien and Tim Anderson as members at this time. Crafter however regained control of the band's social media accounts and announced the other members had all been kicked out for "double crossing" him. He stated that he intended to restart the band with an entirely new lineup, and that he had support from his label and booking agents for this plan.

In 2014, Confession released a new album called Life and Death which included features from The Amity Affliction vocalists Joel Birch and Ahern Stringer. The album was the first Confession release to be completed with Crafter as the sole remaining original member.

In 2016, Confession announced their breakup and completed a national farewell tour. Crafter stated that moving forward he wanted to focus on exploring business ventures.

Confession reformed in 2020 with the intention of doing live shows, although the COVID-19 pandemic forced the cancellation of multiple planned performances. The group did however release a new single "Twenty Twenty" in October 2020, the lyrics of which addressed the pandemic.

In 2022 Confession announced the When Goodbye Means It's Life and Death tour, which took place in Australia across September and October. The tour name combines the title of I Killed the Prom Queen's debut album and Confession's final album, and the band performed songs from both bands at the shows. The shows served as a tribute to the late I Killed the Prom Queen bassist Sean Kennedy, who took his own life the previous year. The band also stated their intention to record new music as well, although so far none has been forthcoming.

In celebration of Parkway Drive's 2024 20th anniversary Australian tour, Crafter made multiple appearances on stage with the band, performing the song 'Boneyards'. While on stage, Winston McCall, the vocalist of Parkway Drive, showed his (and the band's) appreciation for the support from Crafter and IKTPQ which led to their major success in the late 2000s.

== Discography ==
I Killed the Prom Queen

- 2002 – Choose to Love, Live or Die
- 2003 – I Killed The Prom Queen/Parkway Drive: Split CD
- 2003 – When Goodbye Means Forever...
- 2005 – Your Past Comes Back to Haunt You
- 2008 – Music for the Recently Deceased: Australian Tour Edition
- 2008 – Sleepless Nights and City Lights (CD/DVD)

Confession

- 2008 – Can't Live, Can't Breathe
- 2009 – Cancer
- 2011 – The Long Way Home
- 2014 – Life and Death
