= When Goodbye Means Forever... =

Studio album by I Killed the Prom Queen
- Released: 1 December 2003
- Genre: Metalcore
- Length: 42:25
- Label: Resist, Eulogy
- Producer: Dan Jones

I Killed the Prom Queen chronology
I Killed the Prom Queen / Parkway Drive: Split CD (2003)	When Goodbye Means Forever... (2003)	Your Past Comes Back to Haunt You (2005)

Professional ratings
Review scores
Source	Rating
AllMusic	3/5 stars

When Goodbye Means Forever... is the debut album by the Australian metalcore band I Killed the Prom Queen, released in December 2003 by Resist Records. A US version was released in March 2004 by Eulogy Recordings.

== Track listing ==
All tracks are written by I Killed the Prom Queen.

No.	Title	Length
1.	"...Forever Will Come to an End"	0:56
2.	"When Goodbye Mean Forever..."	3:57
3.	"To Kill Tomorrow"	3:36
4.	"Upon a Rivers Sky"	4:18
5.	"Pointed to My Heart"	3:43
6.	"Death Certificate for a Beauty Queen"	4:54
7.	"Roses, Post Cards & Machine Gun Kisses"	4:25
8.	"Forgiveness Is Murder"	4:15
9.	"Portraits, Dreams And Memories"	3:50
10.	"Are You Playing Dead?"	4:25
11.	"My Best Wishes"	4:01

2021 Remix / Remaster
No.	Title	Length
12.	"Closure"	1:43

== Personnel ==
I Killed the Prom Queen members

- Michael Crafter – vocals
- Jona Weinhofen – guitar, vocals on "To Kill Tomorrow", "Upon a Rivers Sky", "Death Certificate for a Beauty Queen", "Forgiveness Is Murder" and "My Best Wishes"
- Kevin Cameron – guitar
- Sean Kennedy – bass guitar
- J. J. Peters – drums

Production details

- Dan Jones – producer, vocals on "Are You Playing Dead?"
- Misstiq – keyboards on "Closure"

== Charts ==
Chart performance for When Goodbye Means Forever...
Chart (2023)	Peak position
Australian Albums (ARIA)	86
