= Sleepless Nights and City Lights =

Live album by I Killed the Prom Queen
- Released: 22 November 2008
- Recorded: 22 May 2008
- Venue: the HQ, Adelaide, Australia
- Genre: Metalcore
- Length: 38:18 (DVD); 52:50 (CD)
- Label: Stomp; Metal Blade

I Killed the Prom Queen chronology
Music for the Recently Deceased (2006)	Sleepless Nights and City Lights (2008)	Beloved (2014)

Professional ratings
Review scores
Source	Rating
AllMusic	2/5 stars

Sleepless Nights and City Lights is a live compilation album and DVD by Australian metalcore band I Killed the Prom Queen, released through Stomp Entertainment on 22 November 2008. The album featured the first live tracks released by I Killed the Prom Queen, excluding the bonus tracks available on the tour edition of Music for the Recently Deceased.

The DVD features the band in front of their hometown crowd at the HQ's in Adelaide, during their final tour, the 2008 Say Goodbye Tour. They performed songs from all of their releases, with the tour bringing the return of former vocalist Michael Crafter. The DVD contains interviews with each band member, discussing their experiences within I Killed the Prom Queen and the possibility of a return. The initial pressing of the DVD came with a live CD recorded at the Hifi Bar in Melbourne and a tour laminate. The original release of the DVD was set for a September release, but was delayed, then was set for an 8 November release, but once again it was delayed due to classification issues. The album was eventually released on 22 November 2008 and 17 March 2009 in the U.S.It is rated MA15+ for Alcohol Abuse.

== Track listing ==
DVD
No.	Title	Length
1.	"Intro"	1:30
2.	"When Goodbye Means Forever..."	4:19
3.	"€666"	3:24
4.	"Choose to Love, Live or Die"	2:54
5.	"Your Shirt Would Look Better with a Columbian Neck-Tie"	3:40
6.	"Bet It All On Black"	3:18
7.	"My Best Wishes"	2:58
8.	"Say Goodbye"	4:16
9.	"Death Certificate for a Beauty Queen"	4:18
10.	"Sharks In Your Mouth"	4:58
11.	"Outro"	2:43
Total length:		38:18

CD
No.	Title	Length
1.	"Intro"	1:10
2.	"When Goodbye Means Forever..."	3:37
3.	"€666"	3:25
4.	"Homicide Documentaries"	3:55
5.	"Choose to Love, Live or Die"	3:27
6.	"Your Shirt Would Look Better with a Columbian Neck-Tie"	3:49
7.	"Upon a River's Sky"	4:12
8.	"Bet It All On Black"	4:21
9.	"Never Never Land"	2:56
10.	"My Best Wishes"	3:13
11.	"To Kill Tomorrow"	3:33
12.	"Say Goodbye"	5:31
13.	"Death Certificate for a Beauty Queen"	4:45
14.	"Sharks In Your Mouth"	4:27
Total length:		52:50

== Personnel ==
I Killed the Prom Queen

- Michael Crafter – lead vocals
- Jona Weinhofen – lead guitar, clean vocals
- Kevin Cameron – rhythm guitar
- Sean Kennedy – bass
- JJ Peters – drums

Additional

- Tim Bates – mixing
- Roman Koester – mixing
- Joe Whyte – cover art

== Charts ==
Chart (2008)	Peak position
Australian Albums (ARIA Charts)	48
