= Atlas (Parkway Drive album) =

Studio album by Parkway Drive
- Released: 26 October 2012
- Recorded: 2012
- Studios: Hydeaway Studios, Minneapolis, U.S.; The Sunset Lodge Studio, Los Angeles, U.S.
- Genres: Metalcore, post-hardcore
- Length: 48:06
- Labels: Resist; Epitaph
- Producer: Matt Hyde

Parkway Drive chronology
Deep Blue (2010)	Atlas (2012)	Ire (2015)

Singles from Atlas
- 1. "Dark Days" Released: 9 September 2012; 2. "Wild Eyes" Released: 13 May 2013

Atlas is the fourth studio album by Australian metalcore band Parkway Drive. It was recorded in Los Angeles, California, and released on 26 October 2012 through Resist and Epitaph Records. The album was produced by Matt Hyde.

At the J Awards of 2012, the album was nominated for Australian Album of the Year.

== Release and promotion ==
On 9 September 2012, Parkway Drive released the album's first single, "Dark Days" along with a music video. On 17 September, Parkway Drive released a 10-second teaser of "Old Ghost / New Regrets" in an interview with Winston McCall on the ABC radio program, The Doctor. On 16 October, "Old Ghost / New Regrets" was released by Parkway Drive through the Epitaph Records YouTube channel.

On 23 October, the full album became available to stream on the Epitaph Records YouTube channel. The album was released on 26 October 2012 through Epitaph Records. The band first started touring in support of the album in Europe between 13 November 2012 and 1 December 2012 with opening bands Emmure, The Word Alive and Structures. On 13 December, they embarked on their second album release tour, to New Zealand and Australia. The band performed as part of Warped Tour Australia in November and December 2013.

== Critical reception ==
Professional ratings
Aggregate scores
Source	Rating
Metacritic	73/100
Review scores
Source	Rating
AbsolutePunk	8.5/10 stars
AllMusic	4/5 stars
Kerrang!	5/5 stars
PopMatters	(7/10)
Revolver	(2.5/5)
Ultimate Guitar	8.6 stars on a 10-point scale

Atlas received generally positive reviews from critics. At Metacritic, which assigns a normalised rating out of 100 to reviews from mainstream critics, the album has an average score of 73 out of 100 based on 6 reviews, indicating "generally favorable reviews". Fred Thomas from AllMusic commented on the album's use of instruments not generally used in metalcore, saying, "The album's depth and openness to straying away from typical devices of the genre make Atlas one of the more engaging and thought-provoking metalcore releases amid a sea of the interchangeable riffs and howls of other bands."

== Commercial performance ==
Atlas debuted at No. 3 on the Australian ARIA albums chart and achieved an ARIA Gold certification for 35,000 shipments in January 2013. In the US, it charted at No. 32 on the Billboard 200, and has sold 63,000 copies in the US as of September 2015.

At the end of the year the album was featured on a few end of year lists. It reached 25 of 101 in Kerrang!. In 2024, John Hill of Loudwire named it the best metalcore album of 2012.

== Track listing ==
All tracks are written by Winston McCall, Jeff Ling, Luke Kilpatrick, and Benjamin Gordon, except where noted; credited to Parkway Drive.

No.	Title	Length
1.	"Sparks"	2:18
2.	"Old Ghost / New Regrets"	2:50
3.	"Dream Run"	4:09
4.	"Wild Eyes"	4:19
5.	"Dark Days"	4:05
6.	"The River"	5:27
7.	"Swing"	3:32
8.	"The Slow Surrender"	4:14
9.	"Atlas"	4:09
10.	"Sleight of Hand"	4:27
11.	"Snake Oil and Holy Water"	2:49
12.	"Blue and the Grey"	5:47
Total length:		48:06

== Personnel ==
Parkway Drive

- Winston McCall – lead vocals
- Jeff Ling – lead guitar
- Luke "Pig" Kilpatrick – rhythm guitar
- Jia "Pie" O'Connor – bass
- Ben "Gaz" Gordon – drums

Additional musicians

- Bruce Mann – trumpet on "Blue and the Grey"
- Daniel "The Duke" Alexander – piano on "Atlas"
- Mariah Green – cello on "Sparks" and "Atlas"
- Alison Belle – violin on "Sparks" and "Atlas"
- DJ Snagtoof – turntables on "The Slow Surrender"
- Tim McAfee Lewis, Skip Jennings, Arnae Baston and Reirani Taurima – vocals on "Sparks", "The River", "Atlas" and "Blue and the Grey"

Additional personnel

- Matt Hyde – production, engineering, mixing, mastering
- Chris Rakestraw – engineering
- Sahir Hanif – drum technician
- Richard Baron – string arrangements
- Dugan Cruz – assistant production, vocal arrangements
- NASA – album cover
- Alex Ormerod and Bec Kilpatrick – photography, booklet photos
- Callum Preston – art direction, layout

== Charts ==
=== Weekly charts ===
Chart (2012)	Peak position
Australian Albums (ARIA)	3
Austrian Albums (Ö3 Austria)	33
Belgian Albums (Ultratop Flanders)	74
Belgian Albums (Ultratop Wallonia)	162
German Albums (Offizielle Top 100)	22
New Zealand Albums (RMNZ)	12
Scottish Albums (Official Charts)	48
Swiss Albums (Schweizer Hitparade)	57
UK Albums (Official Charts)	48
UK Independent Albums (Official Charts)	11
UK Rock & Metal Albums (Official Charts)	3
US Billboard 200	32
US Digital Albums (Billboard)	24
US Independent Albums (Billboard)	5
US Top Hard Rock Albums (Billboard)	3
US Top Rock Albums (Billboard)	8
US Indie Store Album Sales (Billboard)	17

=== Year-end charts ===
Chart (2012)	Peak position
Australian Albums (ARIA)	83

== Certifications ==
Region	Certification	Certified units/sales
Australia (ARIA)	Gold	35,000^{^}
^{^} Shipments figures based on certification alone.
