= Darker Still =

Studio album by Parkway Drive
- Released: 9 September 2022
- Genre: Heavy metal
- Length: 46:30
- Labels: Resist; Epitaph
- Producer: George Hadji-Christou

Parkway Drive chronology
Reverence (2018)	Darker Still (2022)

Singles from Darker Still
- 1. "Glitch" Released: 7 June 2022; 2. "The Greatest Fear" Released: 6 July 2022; 3. "Darker Still" Released: 22 August 2022

Darker Still is the seventh studio album by Australian metalcore band Parkway Drive. It was released on 9 September 2022 through Resist and Epitaph Records. The album was produced by George Hadji-Christou.

At the AIR Awards of 2023, the album was nominated for Best Independent Heavy Album or EP.

At the 2023 ARIA Music Awards, the album was nominated for Best Group and Best Hard Rock/Heavy Metal Album.

== Background and promotion ==
On 11 January 2022, the band announced a North American tour in May and June, supported by Hatebreed, The Black Dahlia Murder, and Stick to Your Guns. However, on 6 April, they announced the cancellation of the tour, stating that "the relentless nature of being in this band has given us very little time to reflect on who we are as individuals, who we want to be and the toll it is taking on ourselves and our friendships." On 23 May, it was announced that for their mental health, Parkway Drive would be taking a break from activity, but clarified that they "are here to stay".

On 7 June, following a series of teasers released on various social media, the band unveiled a brand new single entitled "Glitch" along with a music video. On 8 June, the band announced that their Fall 2022 European tour with Lorna Shore and While She Sleeps would continue as scheduled with a rebrand, and new music to accompany said tour. On 6 July, the band released the second single "The Greatest Fear" and its corresponding music video. At the same time, they officially announced the album itself while also revealed the album cover, the track list and release date. On 22 August, the band published the third single and title track "Darker Still".

== Critical reception ==
Professional ratings
Review scores
Source	Rating
Boolin Tunes	3/10
Kerrang!	4/5 stars
Louder Sound	4/5 stars
Rock 'N' Load	9/10
Rock Sins	8/10
Wall of Sound	9/10

The album received generally positive reviews from music critics. Kerrang! gave the album 4 out of 5 and stated: "Parkway went through hell making this record and they've got the scars to prove it, but they made it out alive to continue their rocket-powered trajectory. These songs of strength survival aren't platitudes, they're promises." Louder Sound gave the album a positive review and stated: "A continuation of the steady evolution over the band's past few efforts, Darker Still's distillation of ideas into a more methodical, deliberate sound is perfectly aimed for the arenas and headline slots the band now comfortably occupy."

Rock 'N' Load praised the album saying, "Darker Still is start to finish unreal. Leave all your preconceived ideas at the door, open your mind and ignore the negativity from the noisy minority, this album will help people through tough times and show them a way through life's shit." Simon Crampton of Rock Sins rated the album 8 out of 10 and said: "Darker Still will no doubt be a divisive record, it's already proving to be before it's even been released. It is a dense, multi-layered album that showcases Parkway Drive at a creative peak. Free of the shackles that others have tried to place on them, they have spread their wings and constructed one of the most expansive, heartfelt and interesting releases of their career." Wall of Sound gave the album almost perfect score 9/10 and saying: "Darker Still isn't just an album, it's a frantic journey of self-discovery that establishes the Byron Bay exports as not only the biggest band in Aussie heavy metal right now, but firmly cements them as key players in the future of heavy music on a global scale. From the shift in genres that'll find them performing alongside ICONS of the industry, through to the throwback sounds that made them local heroes of the scene, this new monster of a release is straight-up heavy for everyone."

On the other hand, Boolin Tunes gave the album a more negative review, rating it 3 out of 10 and stating: "Aside from my individual criticisms, my primary quarrel with Darker Still is that there’s just very little going on that is even remotely noteworthy. A tried and tested formula of anthemic heavy metal tunes, seemingly hardwired to be played on the main stage at a European rock festival. Sure, if you’re into that stuff, I’m sure at least elements of Darker Still will appeal, but long-standing Parkway Drive fans surely know they’re capable of so much more on a musical level. It’s not even a clear-cut case of the group ‘softening up’, moreso a continual watering-down of their already dwindling sound to a point where it becomes null."

== Track listing ==
All tracks are written by Winston McCall, Jeff Ling, Luke Kilpatrick, and Benjamin Gordon, except where noted; credited to Parkway Drive.

Darker Still track listing
No.	Title	Writer(s)	Length
1.	"Ground Zero"		4:09
2.	"Like Napalm"		3:44
3.	"Glitch"		4:21
4.	"The Greatest Fear"		5:28
5.	"Darker Still"	McCall, Ling, Kilpatrick, Gordon, George Hadji-Christou	6:50
6.	"Imperial Heretic"		4:50
7.	"If a God Can Bleed"		2:40
8.	"Soul Bleach"		3:31
9.	"Stranger"		0:50
10.	"Land of the Lost"	McCall, Ling, Kilpatrick, Gordon, Hadji-Christou	4:59
11.	"From the Heart of the Darkness"		5:08
Total length:			46:30

== Personnel ==
Parkway Drive

- Winston McCall – lead vocals
- Jeff Ling – lead guitar
- Luke "Pig" Kilpatrick – rhythm guitar
- Jia "Pie" O'Connor – bass
- Ben "Gaz" Gordon – drums, composition

Additional musicians

- Gordon Hamilton – choir arrangement, conduction, orchestral arrangements, organ
- John Rotar – choir conduction
- Chady Awad, Ramon Ortiz and Maxim Pike – vocals
- Pierre Bouvier and Molly Lewis – whistle

Additional personnel

- George Hadji-Christou – production, vocals, bass, guitar, synthesizers, programming, composition
- Dean Hadji-Christou, Andreas Wiedenhoff and David Spearritt – engineering
- Reinert Wasserman and Stewart Geddes – engineering assistant
- Zakk Cervini – mixing
- Nik Trekov – mixing assistant
- Ted Jensen – mastering
- Dan Strong – drum technician
- Hedi Xandt – artwork, layout

== Charts ==
Chart performance for Darker Still
Chart (2022)	Peak position
Australian Albums (ARIA)	1
Austrian Albums (Ö3 Austria)	7
Belgian Albums (Ultratop Flanders)	11
Belgian Albums (Ultratop Wallonia)	30
Dutch Albums (Album Top 100)	75
Finnish Albums (Suomen virallinen lista)	47
French Albums (SNEP)	188
German Albums (Offizielle Top 100)	5
Scottish Albums (Official Charts)	34
Swiss Albums (Schweizer Hitparade)	5
UK Albums (Official Charts)	56
UK Independent Albums (Official Charts)	5
UK Rock & Metal Albums (Official Charts)	2
