= Deep Blue (Parkway Drive album) =

Studio album by Parkway Drive
- Released: 29 June 2010
- Recorded: 23 March–18 April 2010
- Studios: Jhoc Studios, Los Angeles, U.S.
- Genres: Metalcore; deathcore
- Length: 43:46
- Labels: Resist; Epitaph; Burning Heart
- Producer: Joe Barresi

Parkway Drive chronology
Horizons (2007)	Deep Blue (2010)	Atlas (2012)

Singles from Deep Blue
- 1. "Sleepwalker" Released: 4 June 2010

Deep Blue is the third studio album by Australian metalcore band Parkway Drive. It was recorded in Los Angeles, California, and was released on 29 June 2010 through Resist, Epitaph and Burning Heart Records. The album was produced by Joe Barresi. It debuted at number 2 on the ARIA charts and at number 39 on the Billboard 200 chart. It is also Parkway Drive's most critically acclaimed release, having a three-year separation between their previous album, Horizons.

At the J Awards of 2010, the album was nominated for Australian Album of the Year. It won the 2010 ARIA Award for Best Hard Rock/Heavy Metal Album and has been certified gold in sales by the ARIA.

== Writing and recording ==
The recording of the album was done from March to April 2010, with the writing being done in the band's hometown of Byron Bay over six months. The album was announced on the Parkway Drive MySpace blog, where vocalist and lyricist Winston McCall explained the narrative running through Deep Blue: "It's basically about the search for truth in a world that seems to be devoid of that. The story is told through the eyes of a man who wakes up and realizes that his life is a lie and nothing he believes in is real. So he tries to find the truth within himself and his journey takes him to the bottom of the ocean and back again. The song 'Alone' is a summary of the story Deep Blue tells."

== Release and promotion ==
In April 2010, Parkway Drive appeared at the Groezrock festival in Belgium. On 13 May 2010, Deep Blue was announced for release the following month; alongside this, album's artwork and track listing were posted online. On 18 May, the band put the track "Sleepwalker" up on their MySpace profile and also stated that the album is available for pre-order and preview through iTunes. The filming for the video "Sleepwalker" took place in Brisbane, Australia and Kevin Call from Comeback Kid plays a cameo role. The video was posted online on 9 June. On 16 June, "Unrest" was made available for streaming via the band's Myspace. On 25 June, the whole album was made available for streaming, prior to its release through Epitaph Records on 29 June. Between late June and early August, the band performed on Warped Tour. In October and November 2010, the band went on a European tour with Comeback Kid, Bleeding Through, Emmure, War from a Harlots Mouth, Your Demise and We Came as Romans. In February and March 2011, the band went on a headlining tour of the US with support from Set Your Goals. In May, the group went on a headlining tour of Australia, dubbed The Mix N Mash Tour. They were supported by Bleeding Through, the Wonder Years and Confession. You Me at Six were also initially supposed to join them as a supporting act, but they pulled out of the tour. On 16 May 2011, the ARIA Charts announced that Deep Blue went gold.

== Critical reception ==
Professional ratings
Review scores
Source	Rating
AbsolutePunk	(84%)
AllMusic	4/5 stars
Alternative Press	4.5/5 stars
PopMatters	6/10 stars
Punknews.org	0.5/5 stars
Rock Sound	9/10 stars

Deep Blue has received mostly positive reviews. The New Review gave the album a 4.5 out of 5 and stated "Deep Blue is truly a groundbreaking album. Parkway Drive has unfurled a masterfully crafted, distinct, and intensely heavy work of art which has set the standard for all others in the industry." Rock Sound ranked it as the 42nd best album of the year, stating that the album was "more organic, less restricted and intriguing in its use of dynamic range, Deep Blue provides all the anthems required to keep the fan base devoted with enough room for the occasional deviation or excursions into the metallic wild that may just turn a few new heads in their direction."

== Commercial performance ==
"Sleepwalker" came in at number 97 in the Triple J Hottest 100, 2010.

== Track listing ==
All tracks are written by Winston McCall, Jeff Ling, Luke Kilpatrick, and Benjamin Gordon, except where noted; credited to Parkway Drive.

No.	Title	Length
1.	"Samsara"	1:45
2.	"Unrest"	2:19
3.	"Sleepwalker"	4:01
4.	"Wreckage"	3:21
5.	"Deadweight"	3:47
6.	"Alone"	4:30
7.	"Pressures"	3:22
8.	"Deliver Me"	4:13
9.	"Karma"	3:49
10.	"Home Is for the Heartless" (featuring Brett Gurewitz)	4:08
11.	"Hollow" (featuring Marshall Lichtenwaldt)	3:00
12.	"Leviathan I"	3:49
13.	"Set to Destroy"	1:34
Total length:		43:46

== Personnel ==
Parkway Drive

- Winston McCall – lead vocals
- Jeff Ling – lead guitar
- Luke "Pig" Kilpatrick – rhythm guitar
- Jia "Pie" O'Connor – bass
- Ben "Gaz" Gordon – drums

Additional musicians

- Brett Gurewitz of Bad Religion – guest vocals on "Home Is for the Heartless"
- Marshall Lichtenwaldt of The Warriors – guest vocals on "Hollow"

Additional personnel

- Joe Barresi – production, engineering, mixing
- Brian Gardner – mastering
- Dan Mumford – art direction, artwork, design

== Charts ==
=== Weekly charts ===
Chart (2010)	Peak position
Australian Albums (ARIA)	2
Austrian Albums (Ö3 Austria)	68
German Albums (Offizielle Top 100)	46
New Zealand Albums (RMNZ)	21
Swiss Albums (Schweizer Hitparade)	84
UK Albums (Official Charts)	112
UK Independent Albums (Official Charts)	13
UK Rock & Metal Albums (Official Charts)	11
US Billboard 200	39
US Independent Albums (Billboard)	4
US Top Hard Rock Albums (Billboard)	2
US Top Rock Albums (Billboard)	7
US Indie Store Album Sales (Billboard)	25

=== Year-end charts ===
Chart (2010)	Position
Australian Albums (ARIA)	100

== Certifications ==
Region	Certification	Certified units/sales
Australia (ARIA)	Gold	35,000^{^}
^{^} Shipments figures based on certification alone.
