= Parkway Drive: The DVD =

- Directed by: Ben Gordon, Dylan Etherington
- Produced by: Ben Gordon
- Edited by: Ben Gordon
- Distributed by: Resist Records (in association with Epitaph Records)
- Release date: 22 September 2009
- Running time: 77 minutes
- Country: Australia

Parkway Drive: The DVD is a documentary film about the Australian metalcore group Parkway Drive. It was released on 22 September 2009. It is centered on the formation and beginnings of the band, their record label signings and how they managed to continuously tour from country to country with little time in between. The DVD went platinum in Australia and earned numerous awards in their home country.

== Content ==
=== The DVD ===
- In the Beginning
- Coming Together
- First Show
- Making Progress
- The Truth
- KWAS
- Uncharted Waters
- Other Side of the World
- The Chode
- (Ten) Things Get Ugly
- Only the Best Hotels
- California Dreamin
- On the Road U$A
- Epitaph
- Ups and Downs
- Horizons
- The New Europe
- Around the World
- Sweatfest
- A Different Point of View
- 12/12/08
- Home Sweet Home
- Rolling Dice

=== Live Set ===
1. "Boneyards"
2. "Gimme A D"
3. "Idols and Anchors"
4. "Carrion"
5. "Guns for Show, Knives for a Pro"
6. "The Sirens' Song"
7. "Mutiny"
8. "Feed Them to the Pigs"
9. "Dead Man's Chest"
10. "Smoke 'Em If Ya Got 'Em"
11. "Romance Is Dead"

=== Bonus Content ===
- Bonus footage

== Awards ==
The film won the award of Best Byron Film at the 2010 Byron Bay International Film Festival.

== Certifications ==
Region	Certification	Certified units/sales
Australia (ARIA)	Platinum	15,000^{^}
^{^} Shipments figures based on certification alone.
