= Jona Weinhofen =

Australian guitarist (born 1983)

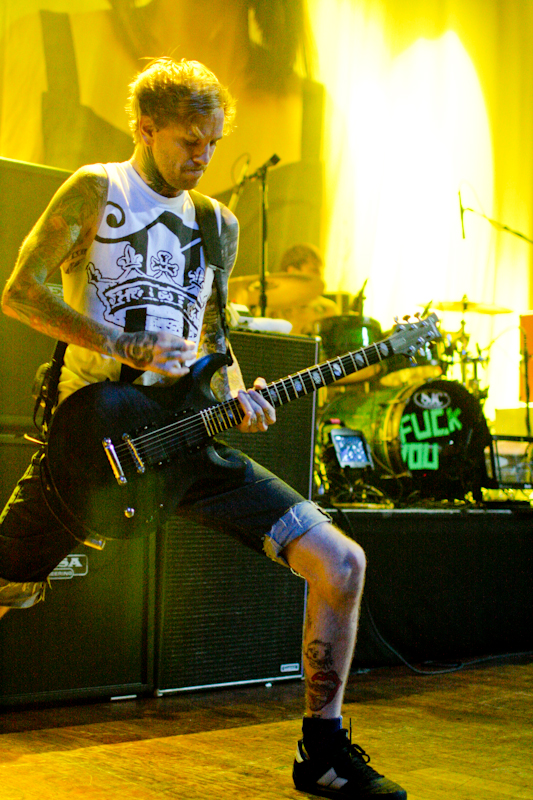
- Weinhofen performing in 2009 with his former band Bring Me the Horizon

Background information
- Born: 1 January 1983 (age 43); Adelaide, Australia
- Genres: Metalcore; extreme metal
- Occupation: Musician
- Instrument: Guitar
- Years active: 2000–present
- Member of: I Killed the Prom Queen
- Formerly of: Bleeding Through; Bring Me the Horizon

Jona Weinhofen (born 1 January 1983) is an Australian musician. He is the lead guitarist for metalcore band I Killed the Prom Queen, and was the rhythm guitarist for British band Bring Me the Horizon, from 2009 to 2013 and the guitarist for Californian band Bleeding Through from 2007 to 2009. In September 2021, he joined Destroy Rebuild Until God Shows alongside Craig Owens.

== Career ==
Weinhofen formed metalcore band I Killed the Prom Queen in Adelaide in 2000 with drummer JJ Peters. The band released two LPs, one EP, a split EP, a demo and a live CD/DVD before their first split in 2007, with Weinhofen acting as manager from 2004 to 2007.

After the departure of vocalist Ed Butcher from I Killed the Prom Queen, Weinhofen was invited to join American band Bleeding Through after the departure of Scott Danough. He played on their release Declaration and can be seen in their videos for "Death Anxiety" and "Germany". His new spot in Bleeding Through was one of several factors that caused the split of I Killed the Prom Queen in 2007. They briefly reunited in 2008 for their "Say Goodbye" farewell tour. Weinhofen left Bleeding Through midway through 2009 partly due to homesickness and discontent with living in America.

Weinhofen replaced Curtis Ward in British band Bring Me the Horizon as a permanent member in March 2009. He was featured in the music video for "The Sadness Will Never End", which was released following the departure of Ward, and recorded with the group on their album There Is a Hell Believe Me I've Seen It. There Is a Heaven Let's Keep It a Secret.

Weinhofen rejoined I Killed the Prom Queen when the band reunited in 2011 to play on the Destroy The Music Tour. The band also started working on a new studio album.

In 2012, Weinhofen had a guest solo spot on Mors Principium Est's album ...And Death Said Live, on the song "What the Future Holds".

In January 2013, Weinhofen left Bring Me the Horizon for undisclosed reasons, which made way for I Killed the Prom Queen to become a full-time band once again. His final album with Bring Me the Horizon, Sempiternal, was recorded in 2012, but released in April 2013 after his departure. I Killed the Prom Queen released their third studio album Beloved in 2014 and went on a hiatus in 2017.

In September 2021, Weinhofen joined the band Destroy Rebuild Until God Shows (D.R.U.G.S.).

Weinhofen has worked with Geelong death metal outfit The Red Shore in an advisory and managerial capacity. The former lead singer and bassist of The Red Shore, Jamie Hope, has since joined I Killed the Prom Queen.

== Recognition ==
Weinhofen was named one of the top 50 greatest guitar players in Australian history by Australian Guitar Magazine in May 2012.

== Personal life ==
Weinhofen is a vegan. He lives a straight edge lifestyle, holds the American nationality and has been living in the United States since 2014, and holds the rank of brown belt in Brazilian jiu-jitsu since January 2026.

== Discography ==
=== I Killed the Prom Queen ===
Studio albums

- When Goodbye Means Forever... (2003)
- Music for the Recently Deceased (2006)
- Beloved (2014)

Extended plays

- Choose to Love, Live or Die (2002)
- Your Past Comes Back to Haunt You (2005)

Splits

- I Killed the Prom Queen / Parkway Drive: Split CD (2003)

=== Bleeding Through ===
Studio albums

- Declaration (2008)

=== Bring Me the Horizon ===
Studio albums

- There Is a Hell Believe Me I've Seen It. There Is a Heaven Let's Keep It a Secret. (2010)
- Sempiternal credit (2013)

Extended plays

- The Chill Out Sessions (2012)

=== Destroy Rebuild Until God Shows ===
Studio albums

- Destroy Rebuild (2022)
