= Parkway Drive =

Australian metalcore band

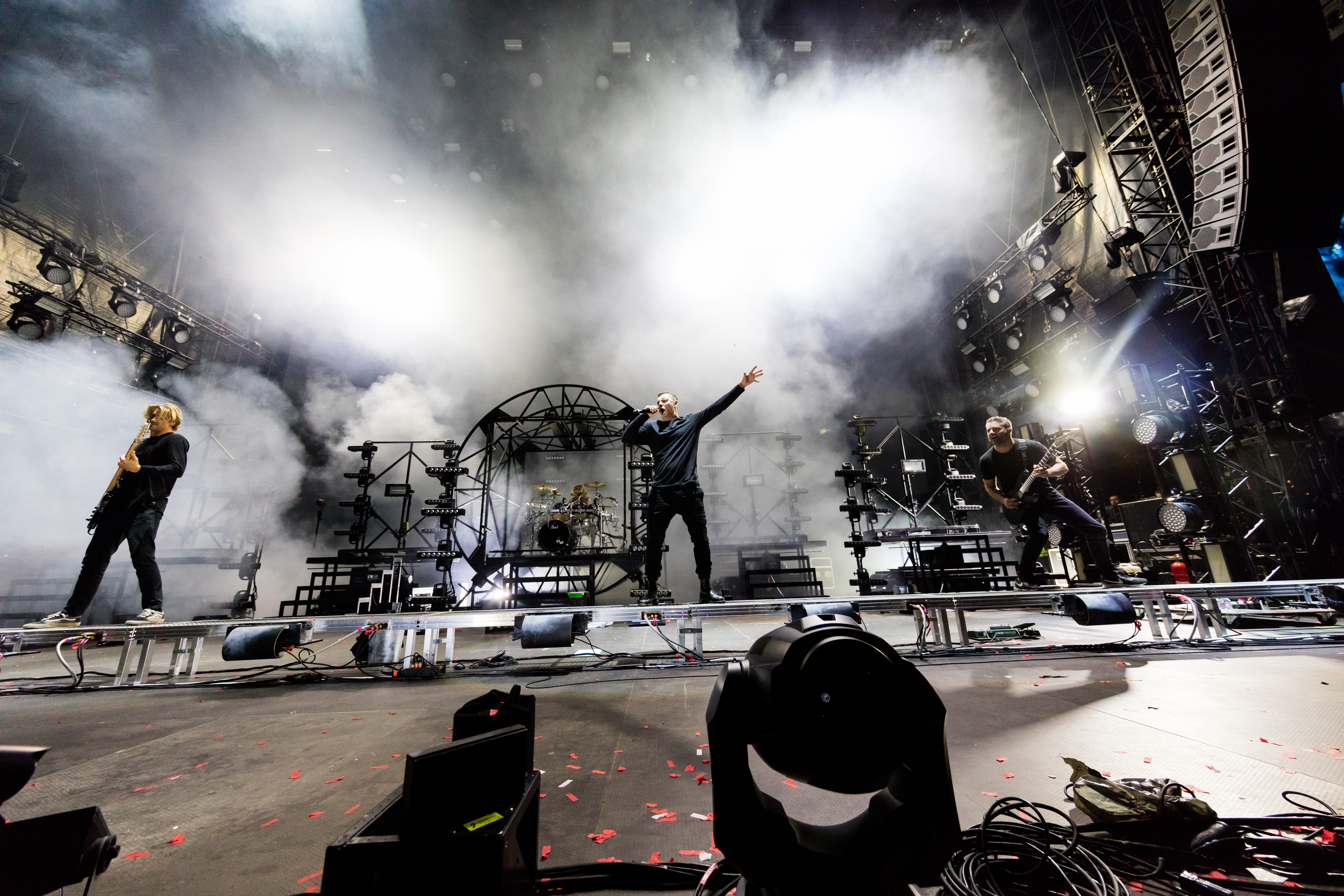
- Parkway Drive performing at Rock am Ring in 2018

Background information
- Origin: Byron Bay, New South Wales, Australia
- Genres: Metalcore; heavy metal
- Years active: 2003–present
- Labels: Resist; Burning Heart; Epitaph; Cooking Vinyl Australia
- Members: Winston McCall; Jeff Ling; Luke Kilpatrick; Ben Gordon; Jia O'Connor
- Past members: Brett Versteeg; Shaun Cash
- Website: parkwaydriverock.com

Parkway Drive are an Australian metalcore band from Byron Bay, New South Wales, formed in 2003. Parkway Drive have released seven studio albums, one EP, two DVDs, a split album and one book, titled Ten Years of Parkway Drive. The band's latest three albums have reached number 1 of the Australian ARIA Charts – Ire (2015), Reverence (2018), and Darker Still (2022).

The band's line-up has remained consistent since the addition of bassist Jia O'Connor in 2006, with Brett Versteeg having left in 2004 and Shaun Cash in 2006.

They are one of Australia's top-selling metalcore bands. Loudwire designated the band as being among modern metalcore's "Big Four", along with Bring Me the Horizon, Architects and Underoath.

== History ==
=== Early years and Killing with a Smile (2003–2006) ===
Parkway Drive were formed at the beginning of 2003. The band took their name from the street where their home rehearsal space and live venue, 'The Parkway House', was located. The 2009 documentary Parkway Drive: The DVD explains that there was a lack of venues for punk rock and hardcore punk bands to practice and perform and that 'Parkway House' was like 'a little oasis for us and all our friends'. The group played their first show at the Byron Bay Youth Centre where I Killed the Prom Queen vocalist Michael Crafter, visiting from Adelaide, also first saw the group and gained their interest. The I Killed the Prom Queen / Parkway Drive: Split CD was released June 2003 and both groups toured Australia over the rest of the year. After signing with Resist Records, the band released the Don't Close Your Eyes EP in 2004 and opened for Shadows Fall, Chimaira, Hatebreed and Alexisonfire on subsequent Australian tours. Winston McCall commented on the EP in early 2005 that he was surprised that "for six songs it's done amazing for us...I'm surprised that kids picked it up so well." Following Brett Versteeg's replacement by Shaun Cash, Parkway Drive flew to the United States where they recorded their debut full-length Killing with a Smile with Killswitch Engage guitarist Adam Dutkiewicz in just two weeks. Manager Graham Nixon later noted that 'it was not the "done thing" for an Australian band to head overseas and work with a producer of that sort of calibre'. The album debuted in the Australian Album (ARIA) charts at 39. In 2006 the group toured in Europe and later returned to North America. In late May 2006, bass player Shaun Cash left the band for personal reasons with full support from the rest of the members. He was replaced by their "merch guy" and long-time friend, Jia "Pie" O'Connor. Parkway Drive signed to American punk label Epitaph in June 2006.

=== Horizons (2007–2009) ===
In July and August 2007, Parkway Drive appeared on that year's Warped Tour in the US. On 24 July 2007, Horizons was announced for release, and its track listing was revealed. On 20 August, "Boneyards" was posted on the band's Myspace profile. Horizons was made available for streaming on 1 October, and was released on 6 October through Epitaph. In October, the band toured across Australia, before going on tour in Europe with Comeback Kid, Cancer Bats, the Warriors, and This Is Hell the following month. A music video for "Boneyards" was posted online on 23 November. In December, the band went on a west coast US tour alongside XDeathstarx.

In January and February 2008, the band went on a US tour alongside Killswitch Engage, the Dillinger Escape Plan and Every Time I Die. Following this, the band performed at the Groezrock festival in Belgium, and went on an Australian tour with Have Heart, Antagonist and Break Even. In July and August, the band supported Darkest Hour on the Trash & Burn tour. During the tour, the band performed at Robot Mosh Fest. In April and May 2009, the band went on a tour of the US with Stick to Your Guns and MyChildren MyBride. The band appeared at The Bamboozle festival in early May.

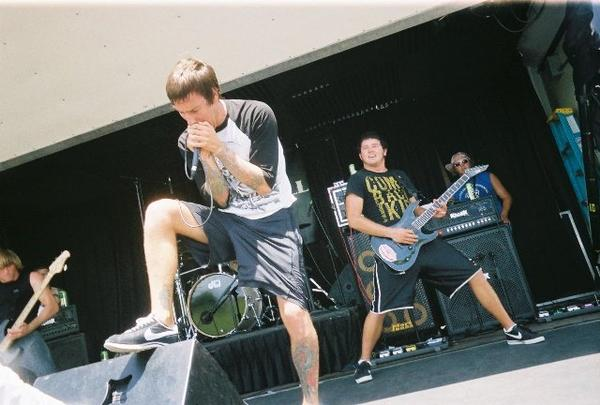
Parkway Drive performing at 2007's Warped Tour

=== Deep Blue (2010–2011) ===
On 23 March 2010, Parkway Drive entered the studio to begin recording their third album, Deep Blue, with producer Joe Barresi. According to their lead vocalist Winston McCall, this was to be their rawest and heaviest record to date. According to a blog that posted on Myspace on 1 April, they had finished tracking the drums for the album. According to a blog posted on 8 April, Parkway Drive were half finished with rhythm guitars, bass and vocals for the upcoming untitled album. On 17 April, Parkway Drive officially announced that they finished recording the forthcoming album, and added a studio diary video to their Myspace.

On 26 April, vocalist Winston McCall revealed in a video-interview two new song-titles: "Home Is for the Heartless" (featuring Brett Gurewitz of Bad Religion) and "Hollow" (featuring Marshall Lichtenwaldt of The Warriors). Winston stated in the interview that the European tour they were on was the last tour until the release of the new album, indicating that the album should be out in stores sometime before the Vans Warped Tour began. In September, the group was nominated for an ARIA Award for Deep Blue in the newly created Best Hard Rock or Heavy Metal Album category and eventually won. It was the first ARIA Award in the band's history.

Parkway Drive received the Australian Independent Record (AIR) Award for 'Best Independent Hard Rock or Punk Album' in 2010 for Deep Blue. In 2011, Winston McCall was featured in The Warriors' song "Panic", from their album See How You Are. That same year, he was featured in You Me at Six's song "Time Is Money" from their album Sinners Never Sleep. It was announced in early 2011 that Parkway Drive would perform at the Sonisphere Festival in Imola, Italy on 25 June and in Knebworth, UK on 10 July.

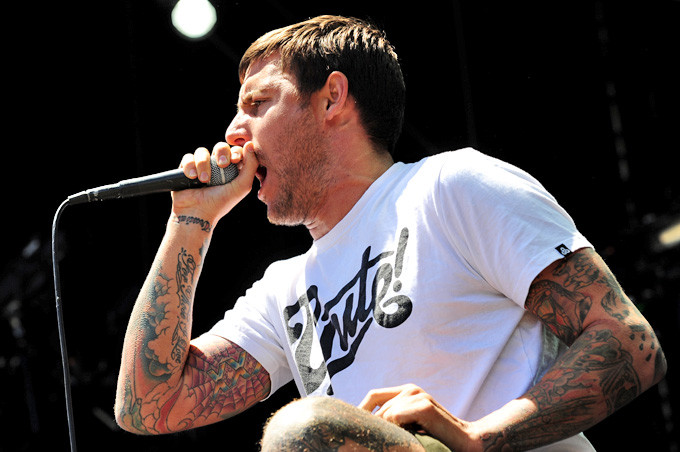
Winston McCall in February 2012

=== Atlas (2012–2013) ===
In an interview with NME, Winston spoke briefly about an upcoming fourth studio album. Winston is quoted as saying, "We've got ideas for this record that are bigger than anything we've done in the past. We're trying to pencil it in, but we want to get in the studio sooner rather than later." The vocalist also gave an update on the condition of the band's guitarist Luke 'Pig' Kilpatrick. The guitarist has been forced to play with the band from a wheelchair after a surfing accident, but McCall said he was improving and would be up on his feet for the band's next tour. He said: "I think he'll be in a cast for a couple more weeks. His leg had swelled up to the size of a football, but it's come down now. He still can't walk on it yet. It's made for an interesting couple of tours and it'll be weird when he is walking around again."

On 10 April 2012, Parkway Drive released a trailer for their new Blu-ray/DVD entitled Home Is for the Heartless with a set release date for 6 July 2012. In an interview with Reviewed Music, Winston McCall stated that "Parkway Drive will be entering the studio following their April European/UK tour to begin recording their upcoming fourth album." Parkway Drive announced via Instagram that they will officially begin recording their new album on 20 June in Los Angeles. On 9 September, Parkway Drive released the album's first single, "Dark Days" along with a music video. On 17 September, Parkway Drive released a 10-second teaser of "Old Ghost / New Regrets" in an interview with Winston McCall on the ABC radio program, The Doctor. On 16 October, "Old Ghost / New Regrets" was released by Parkway Drive through the Epitaph Records YouTube channel.

On 23 October, the full album became available to stream on the Epitaph Records YouTube channel. The album Atlas was released on 26 October 2012 through Epitaph Records. The band first started touring in support of the album in Europe between 13 November 2012 and 1 December 2012 with opening bands Emmure, The Word Alive and Structures. On 13 December, they embarked on their second album release tour, to New Zealand and Australia. The band performed as part of Warped Tour Australia in November and December 2013.

=== Ire (2014–2016) ===
In February 2014, Parkway Drive announced they would be participating in the 2014 Warped Tour on the main stage. On 11 April 2014, they announced on their Instagram that they were working on a new album. On 4 June 2015, Parkway Drive teased a letter for their upcoming fifth studio album; later the same day, the album cover was leaked online in its entirety. The album was called Ire, and a new single entitled "Vice Grip" with a music video was released to the public on 8 June 2015. The release date of Ire was 25 September. On 20 June, "Vice Grip" peaked at number 88 on the Australian singles chart, making it the band's second charting single after "Dark Days", which peaked at number 71 in September 2012. "Crushed" from Ire later reached number 96 on 29 August. On 11 July 2016, the band released a new single "Devil's Calling" for the deluxe edition of Ire.

=== Reverence and Viva the Underdogs (2017–2021) ===
In May 2017, the band announced that they were working on a new album. Vocalist Winston McCall said the album would be "more aggressive" than its predecessor Ire. The album had been expected to be released sometime in 2018. On 27 February 2018, the band released "Wishing Wells", which is the first single from their forthcoming sixth album, whose name not been yet announced. On 13 March, the band announced that their sixth studio album entitled Reverence would be released on 4 May 2018. The second single entitled "The Void" was released alongside this announcement.

The third single entitled "Prey" was released on 24 April. Following the release of Reverence, the band announced the North American tour with August Burns Red and The Devil Wears Prada beginning on 30 August from San Diego, California and ending on 23 September in Hollywood. Reverence won the 2018 ARIA Award for Best Hard Rock or Heavy Metal Album, obtaining the band their second win in the category.

In Spring 2019, Parkway Drive embarked on a co-headlining North American tour with Killswitch Engage dubbed the Collapse the World Tour. On 6 November 2019, the band announced their new documentary movie Viva the Underdogs would be screened for one night only across the world on 22 January 2020, detailing their 15-year rise to fame from the Byron Bay hardcore days in 2003, through to their UK Festival headline performances in 2019.

The band announced "Viva the Underdogs" worldwide tour to celebrate the release of Viva the Underdogs. The European portion of the tour was announced on 27 November 2019 with Venom Prison, Stick to Your Guns and Hatebreed as supporters. The Australian portion was announced on 9 December 2019 with Every Time I Die and Hatebreed as supporters. The North America portion was announced on 18 February 2020 with include Hatebreed, Knocked Loose and Fit for a King as supporters, and the tour would be the first time that Parkway Drive will be using their pyrotechnics in North America. All three portions of the tour have been postponed to different dates in 2021 and 2022 due to COVID-19 pandemic.

On 23 January 2020, the band announced the Viva the Underdogs soundtrack, which features live recordings from their Wacken Open Air 2019 headline performance and three rerecorded songs with frontman Winston McCall singing in German. In December 2020, Parkway Drive were listed at number 32 in Rolling Stone Australia's "50 Greatest Australian Artists of All Time" issue.

=== Darker Still (2022–present) ===
Parkway live in Frankfurt, Germany 2022

On 11 January 2022, the band announced a North American tour in May and June, supported by Hatebreed, The Black Dahlia Murder, and Stick to Your Guns. However, on 6 April, they announced the cancellation of the tour, stating that "the relentless nature of being in this band has given us very little time to reflect on who we are as individuals, who we want to be and the toll it is taking on ourselves and our friendships." On 23 May, it was announced that for their mental health, Parkway Drive would be taking a break from activity, but clarified that they "are here to stay".

On 7 June, following a series of teasers released on various social media, the band unveiled a brand new single entitled "Glitch" along with a music video. On 8 June, the band announced that their Fall 2022 European tour with Lorna Shore and While She Sleeps would continue as scheduled with a rebrand, and new music to accompany said tour. On 6 July, the band released the second single "The Greatest Fear" and its corresponding music video. At the same time, they officially announced that their seventh studio album, Darker Still, was set for release on 9 September 2022, whilst also revealing the album cover and the track list. On 22 August, the band published the third single and title track "Darker Still".

Throughout 2023, the band celebrated their 20th anniversary with two separate US tours, one taking place on January and February with Memphis May Fire and Currents. The second leg took place in September and October with support by The Amity Affliction, Northlane, and Make Them Suffer.

The band performed on the Mayhem Fest concert tour in 2024. In September, they headlined a short 20th anniversary in Australia. On May 7, 2025, the band released the single "Sacred".

The band appeared at Welcome to Rockville in Daytona Beach, Florida in May 2026. In March, Gordon's brother, Jed, was convicted after having sexual intercourse with a minor. Jed featured heavily in the 2009 documentary of the band, and was known as the band's merchandise manager. The band released a statement afterward stating that he was "no longer involved with Parkway Drive in any capacity."

== Musical style and influences ==
Parkway Drive's genre was previously almost exclusively described as "thumping, thrashy" metalcore. Their earlier albums had deathcore influences, which were especially apparent on Deep Blue; more recently, the band switched to a more traditional heavy metal sound. Their sound usually employed screaming vocals, breakdowns and Gothenburg metal-style guitar riffs. Winston McCall's vocals have drawn comparisons to those of Randy Blythe of Lamb of God. Unlike many other popular modern metalcore bands, Parkway Drive did not use clean singing on any of their studio albums until their 2015 studio album Ire, although they did use them on some songs on their first two EPs, on which they were performed by the band's original bassist Brett Versteeg. However, following the shift in style during Reverence, Winston McCall stated that Parkway Drive have "outgrown metalcore", and have transitioned away from their earlier roots. Loudwire categorized the band's later output as "dad rock".

They have cited influences from Rage Against the Machine, Metallica, Slayer, Iron Maiden, Bad Religion, Pennywise, the Offspring, Faith No More, the Dillinger Escape Plan, Hatebreed and Killswitch Engage.

== Band members ==
Parkway Drive live at With Full Force 2019

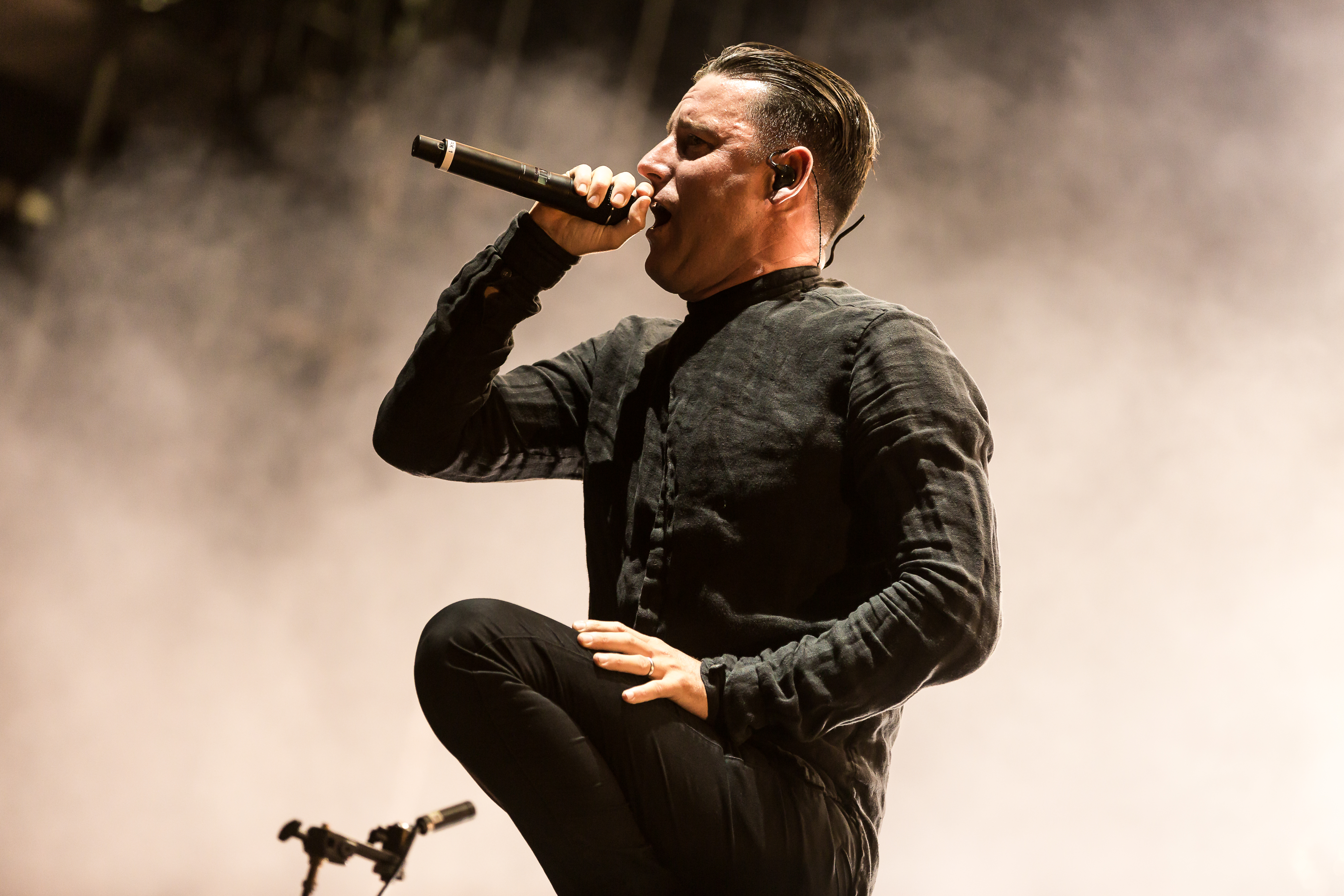
Winston McCall

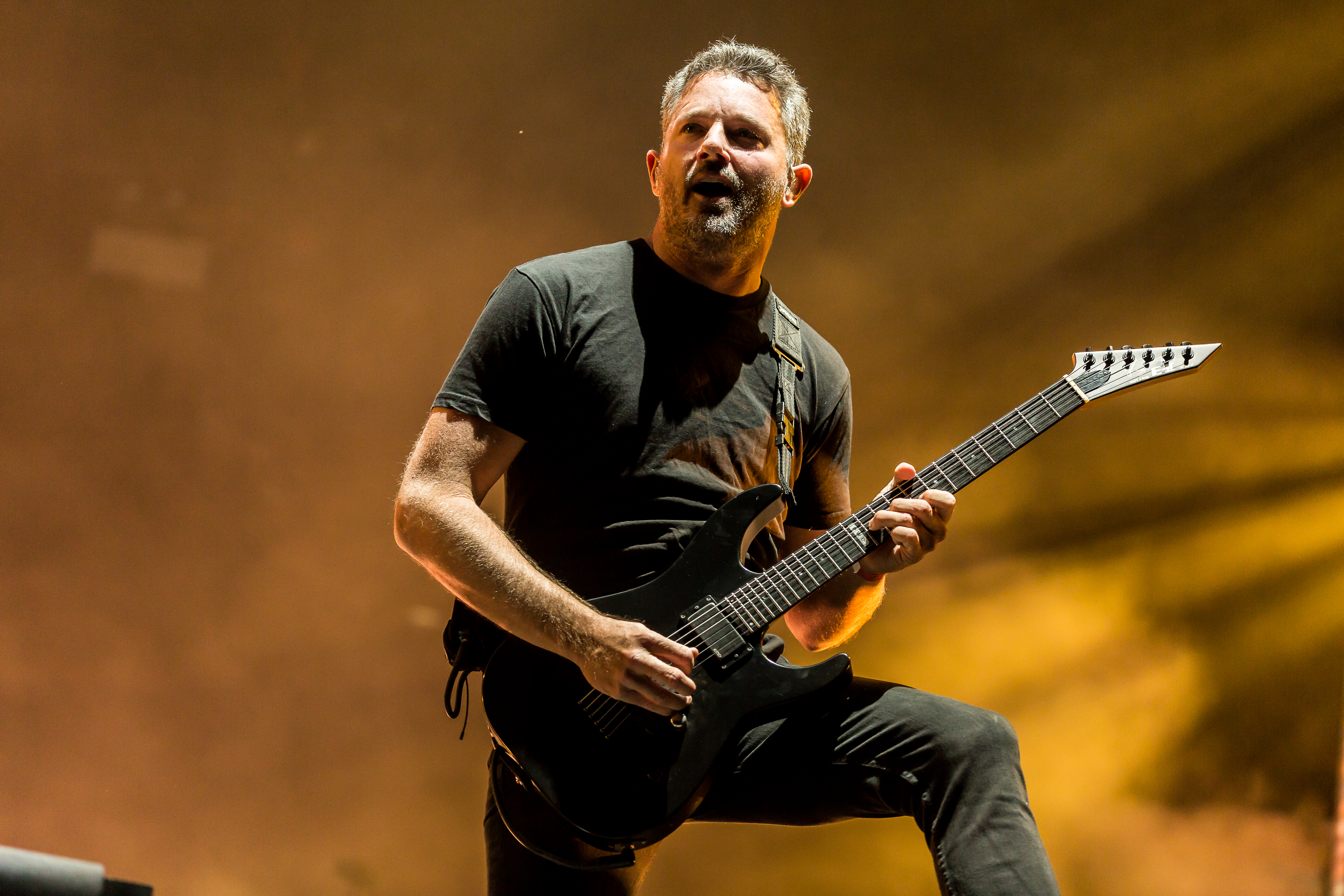
Jeff Ling

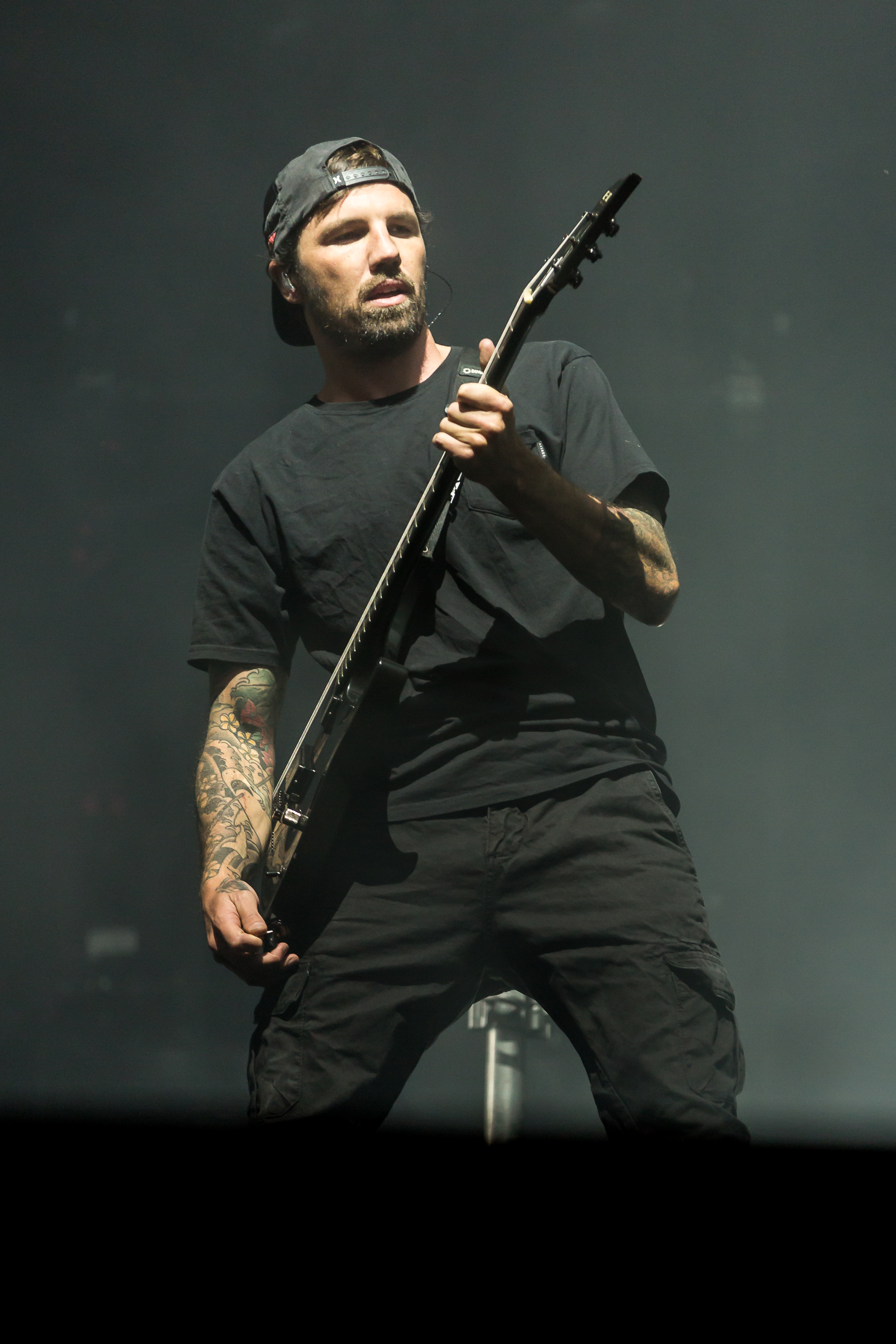
Luke Kilpatrick

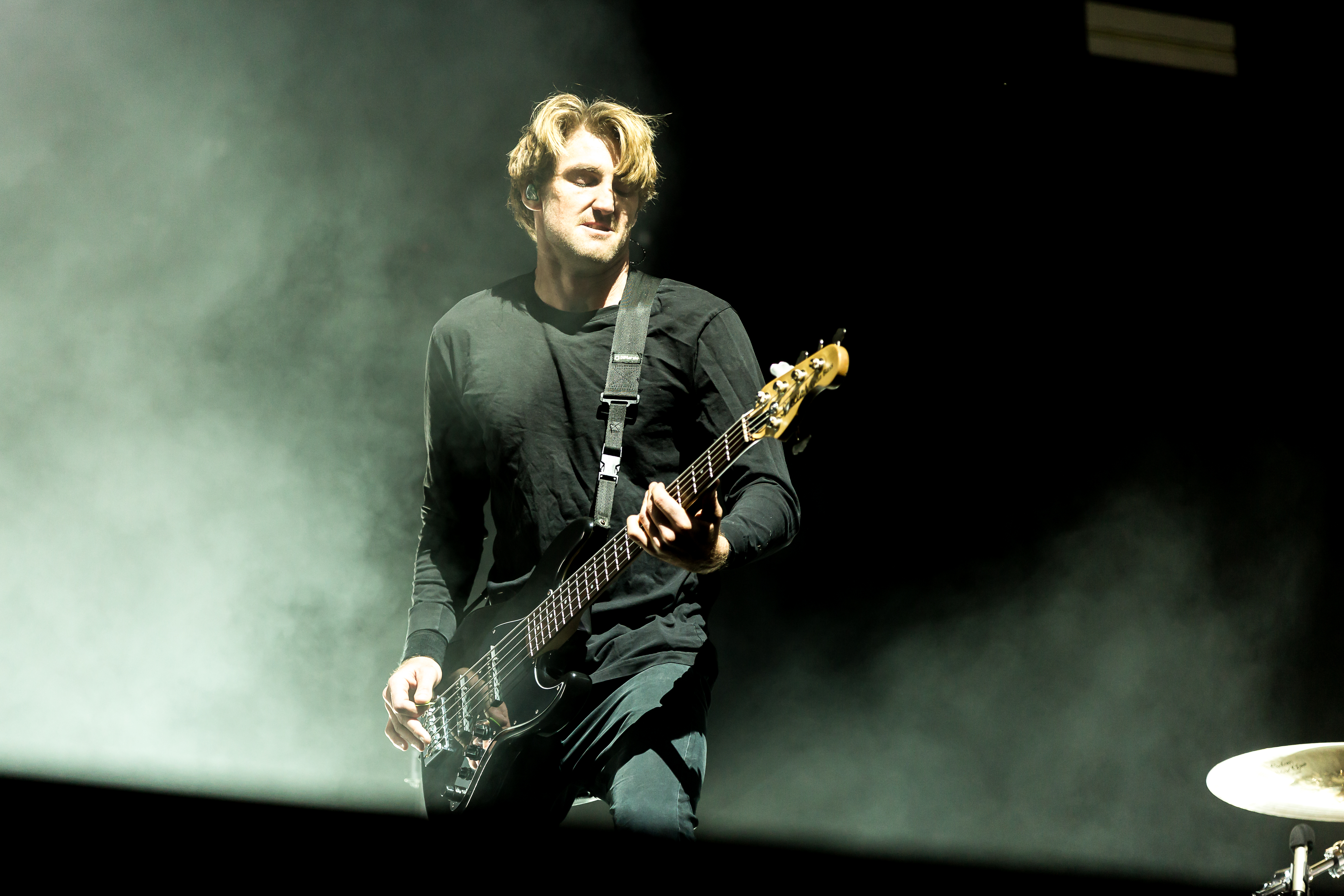
Jia O'Connor

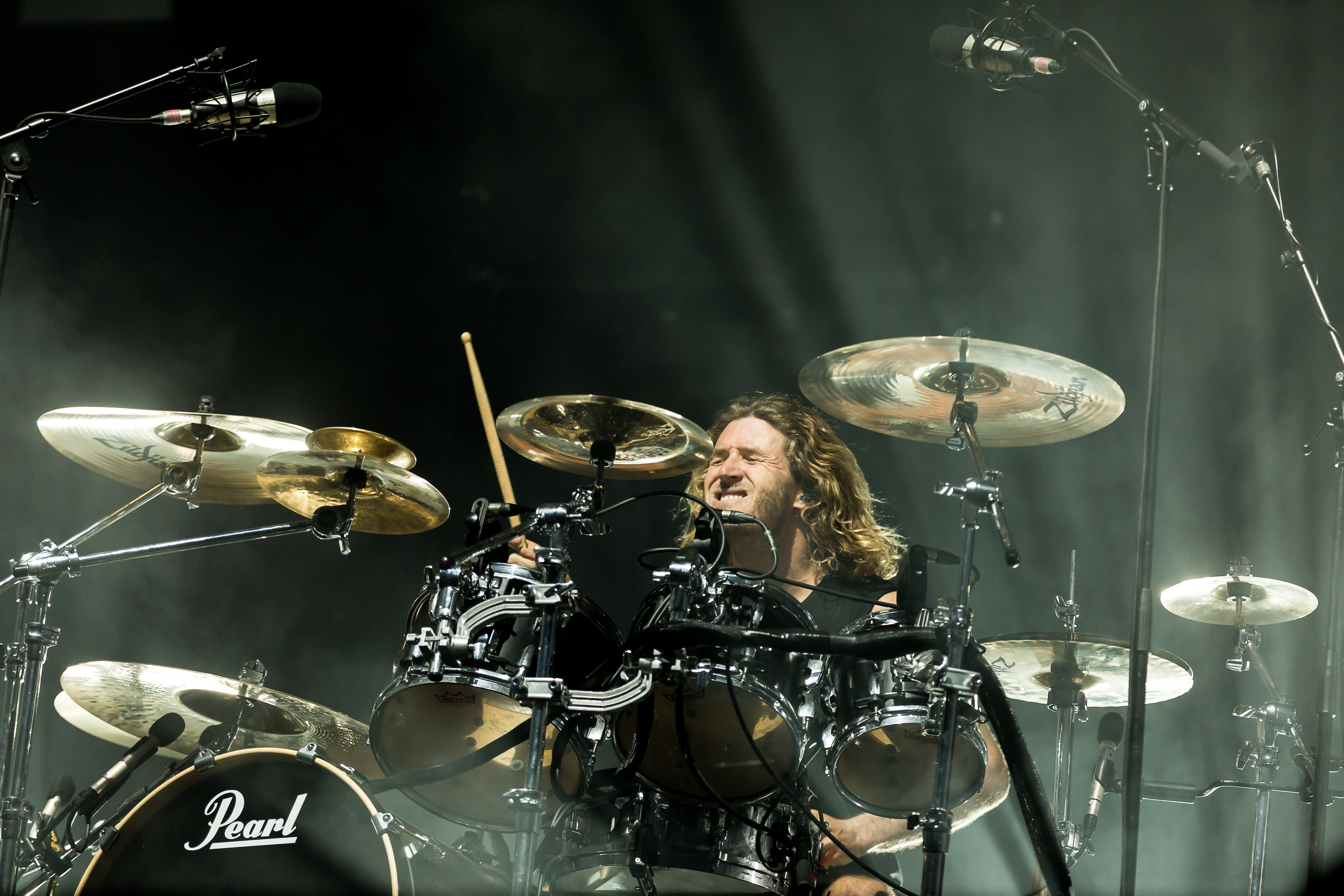
Ben Gordon

Current

- Winston McCall – lead vocals (2003–present)
- Jeff Ling – lead guitar (2003–present)
- Luke "Pig" Kilpatrick – rhythm guitar (2003–present)
- Ben "Gaz" Gordon – drums (2003–present)
- Jia "Pie" O'Connor – bass (2006–present)

Former

- Brett "Lagg" Versteeg – bass, backing vocals (2003–2004)
- Shaun "Cashy" Cash – bass (2004–2006)

Timeline

== Discography ==
- Killing with a Smile (2005)
- Horizons (2007)
- Deep Blue (2010)
- Atlas (2012)
- Ire (2015)
- Reverence (2018)
- Darker Still (2022)

== Awards and nominations ==
=== AIR Awards ===
The Australian Independent Record Awards (known colloquially as the AIR Awards) is an annual awards night to recognise, promote and celebrate the success of Australia's Independent Music sector.

Year	Nominee / work	Award	Result	Ref.
2010	Deep Blue	Best Independent Hard Rock or Punk Album	Won	
2013	Atlas	Best Independent Hard Rock or Punk Album	Nominated	
2021	Viva the Underdogs	Best Independent Heavy Album or EP	Nominated	
2023	Darker Still	Best Independent Heavy Album or EP	Nominated	

=== APRA Awards ===
The APRA Awards are held in Australia and New Zealand by the Australasian Performing Right Association to recognise songwriting skills, sales and airplay performance by its members annually.

Year	Nominee / work	Award	Result	Ref.
2024	"Darker Still" by Parkway Drive	Most Performed Hard Rock / Heavy Metal Work	Won	
2026	"Sacred" by Parkway Drive	Most Performed Hard Rock / Heavy Metal Work	Nominated	

=== ARIA Music Awards ===
The ARIA Music Awards is an annual awards ceremony that recognises excellence, innovation, and achievement across all genres of Australian music. Parkway Drive has won 3 awards from 6 nominations.

Year	Nominee / work	Award	Result	Ref.
2010	Deep Blue	Best Hard Rock or Heavy Metal Album	Won	
2016	Ire	Best Hard Rock or Heavy Metal Album	Nominated	
2018	Reverence	Best Hard Rock or Heavy Metal Album	Won	
2020	Viva the Underdogs	Best Hard Rock or Heavy Metal Album	Nominated	
2023	Darker Still	Best Group	Nominated	
2023	Darker Still	Best Hard Rock/Heavy Metal Album	Won	

=== J Awards ===
The J Awards are an annual series of Australian music awards that were established by the Australian Broadcasting Corporation's youth-focused radio station Triple J. They commenced in 2005.

Year	Nominee / work	Award	Result
2012	Atlas	Australian Album of the Year	Nominated
2015	Ire	Australian Album of the Year	Nominated

=== Rolling Stone Australia Awards ===
The Rolling Stone Australia Awards are awarded annually in January or February by the Australian edition of Rolling Stone magazine for outstanding contributions to popular culture in the previous year.

Year	Nominee / work	Award	Result	Ref.
2023	Darker Still	Best Record	Nominated	
2025	Parkway Drive	Best Live Act	Shortlisted	

== See also ==
- Metalcore
- List of metalcore bands
- I Killed the Prom Queen
