= The Warriors (American band) =

American hardcore punk band

- Origin: Tehachapi, California, U.S.
- Genres: Hardcore punk, metalcore
- Years active: 2001–present
- Labels: Pure Noise, Victory, Eulogy
- Members: Marshall Lichtenwaldt; Charlie Alvarez; Javier Zarate; Joe Martin; Roger Camero

The Warriors is an American hardcore punk band originally from Tehachapi, California. Due to member changes, The Warriors are now primarily based in Oxnard, California. Their work is heavily influenced by 1990s bands such as Rage Against the Machine and Snapcase.

== History ==
The Warriors followed their debut 7" release with a full-length album titled War Is Hell, released on Eulogy Recordings in 2003. In 2005 it was reissued with two extra tracks and computer accessible content, under the title War Is Hell Redux. In 2006 their second album, Beyond The Noise, was released. They are now signed on to Victory Records. In 2007 they released their third album Genuine Sense of Outrage.

On a demo release distributed by Eulogy Recordings, the songs "Set the Stage" and "The Red, Black and Blue" from their album War Is Hell were featured.

The vocalist Marshall Lichtenwaldt was featured in the song "Hollow", originally recorded on Parkway Drive's EP Don't Close Your Eyes, and then re-released on their 2010 album Deep Blue. In 2011, Parkway Drive's lead singer Winston McCall was featured in The Warriors' song "Panic", from the album See How You Are.

In the second episode of the second season of the Netflix series Marvel's Daredevil, the song "The Price of Punishment" can be heard. It is also featured in Far Cry 5 and Steep

In 2019, hardcore band Knocked Loose released a cover of "Slings And Arrows" from War Is Hell on their "Mistakes Like Fractures" EP.

== Current members ==
- Marshall Lichtenwaldt – vocals
- Charlie Alvarez – guitar
- Javier Zarate – guitar
- "Uncle" Joe Martin – bass
- Roger Camero – drums

== Former members ==
- Danny Phillips – guitar
- Donny Phillips – drums
- Mike Preisendorfer – bass
- Matt Anderson – drums
- Daniel "Danny" Lopez – bass
- Kyle Garcia – drums
- Jacob Wilson – drums

== Discography ==
- War Is Hell (2004)
- Beyond the Noise (2006)
- Genuine Sense of Outrage (2007)
- See How You Are (2011)
- Monomyth (2019)
- Burn Yourself Alive (2025)
