= I Killed the Prom Queen =

Australian metalcore band

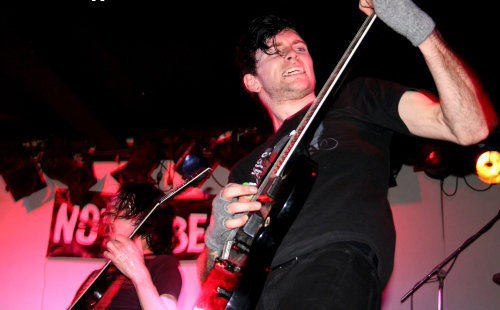
- Kevin Cameron (left) and Jona Weinhofen (right) at the Corner Hotel in Melbourne in August 2005.

Background information
- Also known as: Child Left Burning; The Rubik's Equation
- Origin: Adelaide, South Australia, Australia
- Genres: Melodic metalcore
- Years active: 2000–2007; 2008; 2011–2016; 2025–present
- Labels: Epitaph; 618; Final Prayer; Missing Link; Resist; Eulogy; Stomp; Metal Blade; UNFD
- Members: Jona Weinhofen; JJ Peters; Michael Crafter; Kevin Cameron; Jamie Hope
- Past members: Benjamin Coyte; Simon O'Gorman; Lee Stacy; Leaton Rose; Sean Kennedy; Ed Butcher; Shane O'Brien
- Website: ikilledthepromqueen.com

I Killed the Prom Queen are an Australian metalcore band from Adelaide, formed in 2001. They were prominent in the Australian live music scene and toured the US, Japan and Europe several times. They issued three studio albums: When Goodbye Means Forever... (2003), Music for the Recently Deceased (2006) and Beloved (2014). The latter two albums peaked at #27 and #6 on the ARIA Albums Chart respectively.

The band initially split up in April 2007 due to the inability to find a permanent vocalist. They reformed with vocalist Michael Crafter to play a farewell tour in mid-2008 and released a live album and DVD, Sleepless Nights and City Lights, which peaked at #48 in Australia. In May 2011 the band reformed with new vocalist Jamie Hope and performed on the Destroy Music Tour. They subsequently released their third studio album Beloved in February 2014.

== History ==
=== Formation and Choose to Love, Live or Die, Stacy's departure (2001–2002) ===
I Killed the Prom Queen formed in Adelaide, South Australia in 2001, with the original line-up featuring Ben Engel on bass guitar, Simon O'Gorman on guitar, JJ Peters (Josef John W. Peters) on drums, Lee Stacy on vocals and Jona Weinhofen on guitar. Peters, Weinhofen and bass guitarist Leaton Rose had previously been members of the local band Cur. In 2000 Weinhofen left Cur to form The Fall of Troy with vocalist Michael Crafter, before later forming I Killed the Prom Queen.

Originally named The Rubik's Equation, then briefly Child Left Burning, Michael Crafter joined to share lead vocals and soon after Rose replaced Engel on bass guitar. The band's first performance was at the Dom Polski Centre in Adelaide, October 21, 2001. The band was influenced by late 1990s hardcore bands Poison the Well, Converge, Hatebreed, and Earth Crisis and Swedish melodic death metal groups like At the Gates, Soilwork and In Flames.

In late 2001 and early 2002, the group recorded the four-track Choose to Love, Live or Die EP, which was produced by Paul Degasperi and the band; with additional guitar supplied by Cain Kapetanakis. Five songs were recorded during the sessions, but a computer glitch caused the fifth to be erased. In 2002, it was issued by 618 Recordings, then re-released by Final Prayer Records and distributed by Missing Link Records. O'Gorman left after the release to join Day of Contempt and he was replaced by guitarist Kevin Cameron in late 2002. Choose to Love, Live or Die was the only release to include both Lee Stacey's vocals and the higher-pitched vocals by Crafter, as Stacy would depart from the band later that year. The tracks were later re-recorded for their third EP, Your Past Comes Back to Haunt You (2005).

=== Split CD with Parkway Drive and When Goodbye Means Forever (2003–2005) ===
In March 2003, Rose departed (he later joined The Hot Lies) and Sean Kennedy took his place. The new lineup then recorded the "Homicide" demo, which appeared on Blunt Magazine's Harder Core than You compilation. While in Byron Bay Crafter saw the first performance by local metalcore band Parkway Drive and was so impressed that he invited the group to record a split CD with his band. In May, Final Prayer Records issued the I Killed the Prom Queen / Parkway Drive split EP, with two tracks by I Killed the Prom Queen ("Homicide Documentaries" and "Death Certificate for a Beauty Queen") and two by Parkway Drive.

In September, the line-up of Cameron, Crafter, Kennedy, Peters and Weinhofen recorded their debut studio album When Goodbye Means Forever... for Sydney hardcore label Resist Records, which was released in December. It was produced by Dan Jones, Anj and the group. In early 2004, they toured Australia with Evergreen Terrace, Give Up the Ghost, and Boysetsfire. The album was released in the US by Eulogy Recordings in March, and extensive US touring followed. Crafter said that when entering Hawaii, "Three of us got questioned. They were asking us what jails we had been in, what our parents did and what our parents thought of our tattoos".

The band spent the coming months supporting Caliban, Evergreen Terrace, It Dies Today, Lamb of God, Silverstein, Bleeding Through, The Red Chord, Fear Before the March of Flames, Until the End, The Warriors, Between the Buried and Me, and On Broken Wings over four months. On March 7, 2005, the band released their third EP, Your Past Comes Back to Haunt You. The recording featured reworked versions of the band's older songs and "To Be Sleeping While Still Standing". The latter track was written by The Fall of Troy (not to be confused with the US band of the same name), an earlier band including Crafter and Weinhofen, which only played two shows before breaking up.

=== Music for the Recently Deceased (2005–2007) ===
In August 2005, I Killed the Prom Queen flew to Sweden to record their follow-up album, Music for the Recently Deceased. By late 2005, they had completed recording the album but in January 2006 Crafter was fired. Instead of releasing the album as it was, they decided to recruit a new vocalist and replace Crafter's tracks. They recruited Ed Butcher from UK band The Hunt for Ida Wave. New lyrics were written by Cameron and Butcher, while some lyrics that the whole band had contributed during the Crafter sessions were retained. Music for the Recently Deceased was produced by Fredrik Nordström, whose other credits included Dimmu Borgir, Darkest Hour, At the Gates and In Flames, and by Patrik J. Sten.

The album was released on 31 July 2006 by Stomp Entertainment and peaked in the top 30 on the ARIA Albums Chart. The Australian tour in support of the album had over 50 concert dates in three months, from north Western Australia to the southern states and then along the east coast to Cairns. They followed with a support slot on a tour for US groups Killswitch Engage and Lamb of God. The Sydney show brought 3,500 patrons to Luna Park, where I Killed the Prom Queen also played at the annual Come Together Music Festival. Shortly afterward Metal Blade released the album in the US, coinciding with the group's appearance at the New England Metal and Hardcore Festival. Returning to Australia after their third tour of the US in three years, the group toured with The Haunted and Exodus and in December, before headlining the Metal for the Brain festival.

=== Break-up and Say Goodbye Tour (2007–2008) ===
"At the time we were without a permanent vocalist and were in a strange place. Jona was offered the opportunity to join Bleeding Through and we didn't want to continue the band without him, so we decided to call it a day."

— JJ Peters in an interview in 2011.

In January 2007 Butcher left the band, which he attributed to "personal reasons". Weinhofen later stated that limited touring markets for the band at the time, and the accompanying financial issues, also put pressure on Butcher and the band during this period. After returning to the UK, Butcher fronted UK metalcore band Eternal Lord from 2007 to 2008. Tyrone Ross from Mourning Tide subsequently filled in as the vocalist for I Killed the Prom Queen for a Japanese tour. Colin Jeffs of Bendigo band Heavenslost and Aversions Crown then provided vocals on a European tour with Bleeding Through, All Shall Perish and Caliban.

In April 2007, I Killed the Prom Queen announced their breakup, citing both an inability to find a permanent vocalist and Weinhofen's decision to join Bleeding Through. Soon after a final Australian tour with Crafter on vocals was arranged for 2008.

In May 2008, Stomp re-issued Music For The Recently Deceased in a limited tour edition – of 5,000 hand-numbered copies – for the Say Goodbye Tour. The release included a cardboard slipcase, two live tracks and four tracks with Crafter's vocals taken from the original album recording. The group toured in May and June, with most of the 18 shows selling out. The support acts were Bring Me the Horizon, The Red Shore, The Ghost Inside and local acts from each city. A live album and DVD, Sleepless Nights and City Lights, was recorded at their Adelaide performance; it was released on 22 November 2008 and peaked in the top 50. I Killed the Prom Queen played what was meant to be their final show in Brisbane on 8 June 2008.

=== Hiatus (2008–2011) ===
After the Say Goodbye tour Crafter formed Melbourne hardcore band Confession. He also previously did stints as the vocalist for Carpathian (2006–2007) and Bury Your Dead (2007). He also appeared as a contestant on reality TV show Big Brother in 2008.

Weinhofen departed Bleeding Through in 2009 and joined Bring Me the Horizon the same year. He acted as Bring Me the Horizon's rhythm guitarist, keyboardist, programmer and backing vocalist until January 2013, at which point the band's manager notified him that the band had kicked him out. He also managed Australian deathcore act The Red Shore.

Kevin Cameron formed the progressive metalcore band In Trenches with vocalist Ben Coyte. He also acted as a touring musician for several other groups. Peters formed and fronted hardcore project Deez Nuts and was one half of the hip-hop duo Grips & Tonic, alongside New Zealand rapper Louie Knuxx. Kennedy played bass for Deez Nuts on Australian and international tours.

=== Reformation, Beloved and second hiatus (2011–2017) ===
In March 2011 I Killed the Prom Queen announced their reunion and an upcoming Australian tour in May with The Amity Affliction, Deez Nuts, and Of Mice & Men. Jamie Hope (Who was previously the vocalist of The Red Shore) joined the band as their new permanent vocalist. At the time, Weinhofen was not planning to leave Bring Me the Horizon and intended to remain in both groups. Likewise Peters continued his work with Deez Nuts.

In January 2012 Weinhofen confirmed that the band was writing their third studio album and said they were entering the studio at the end of the year with a tentative release date for the album in early 2013. However, in March 2013 the band announced on Facebook that the planned release date had been pushed back to early 2014.

The band played three UK dates in July. These three shows were around a similar time the band was planning to perform at the 2012 Sonisphere festival however, the festival was cancelled. After the cancellation, the band incorporated the UK shows into a 17-date European tour across eleven countries. Jona Weinhofen said touring in Europe was special for the band as they have a very strong fanbase there.

On 21 August 2012, I Killed the Prom Queen released new song "Memento Vivere" on YouTube. The accompanying live footage was taken from the recent European tour. The release was their first new song in six years, and the first song with Hope on vocals.

"JJ Peters is my oldest & closest friend in the entire world. We went to high school together, we'e played together in bands prior to IKTPQ and I believe we will continue to work together in the future. Its sad to think that he will no longer be a part of IKTPQ but I know he's going to continue to kill it with DN and anything else musical that he touches."

— Jona Weinhofen on JJ Peters' departure from the band

The band supported Parkway Drive on the Australian and New Zealand legs of the "Atlas Tour" in December 2012. In January 2013, Weinhofen departed Bring Me The Horizon, and shortly after his departure he confirmed that Prom Queen would become a full-time band.

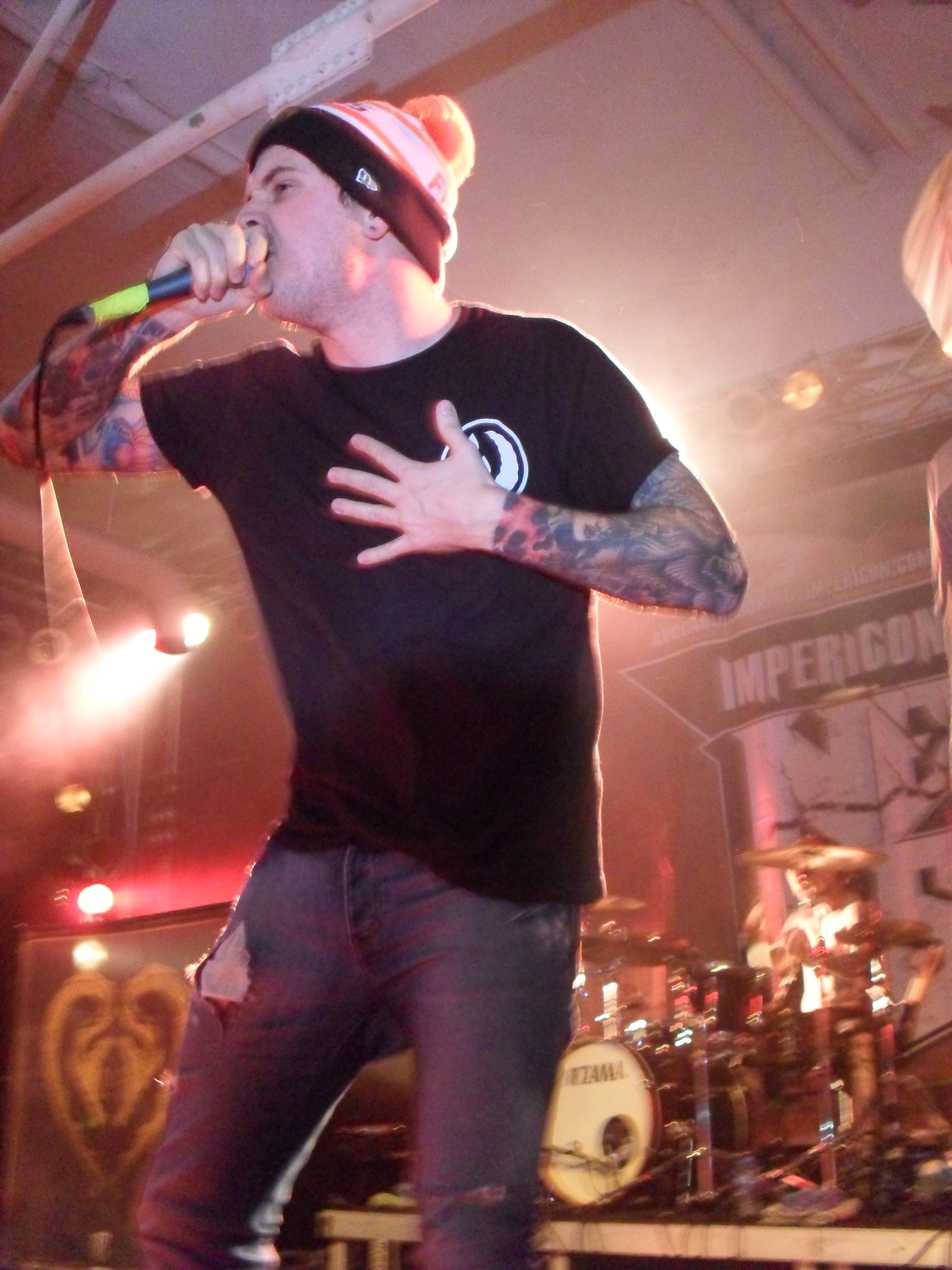
Jamie Hope on the Impericon Never Say Die! Tour 2013 in Cologne, Germany

On 24 March 2013 the band announced on Facebook that JJ Peters had left the band amicably to focus on his other project Deez Nuts. He was replaced by Shane O'Brien, formerly of Confession and Buried In Verona. This made Weinhofen the last remaining original member of the band, although Weinhofen and Cameron were the songwriters for every release since their debut EP.

I Killed the Prom Queen opened for Asking Alexandria on the "They Don't Pray for Us Tour" and Whitechapel on their short headline tour in America during spring 2013. This was the band's first time in the country in seven years. An extensive Australian tour was also announced, with Buried In Verona as the support act. The band also announced dates in Australia and Asia, described as reunion shows with Crafter fronting the band for half the tour and Butcher fronting for the second half, although this was just an April Fools' joke. The band were also due to play four summer dates in New Zealand alongside the Australian tour dates. However, the New Zealand dates were cancelled eight days out from the opening show in Auckland. They then performed the Never Say Die tour throughout Europe and UK, headlined by Emmure.

In late July 2013 Sean Kennedy announced on his Instagram account that he was no longer a member of the band and would not be featured on the third album. Ben Coyte (ex-Day Of Contempt, Carpathian and current In Trenches vocalist) replaced Kennedy on bass and played his first show with the band at Resurrection Fest 2013.

I Killed the Prom Queen announced that they had signed with Epitaph Records and that the new album Beloved would be released in Australia on 14 February 2014 and in the US on 18 February 2014. On 3 December 2013 they released the new single "To the Wolves". A music video for "Thirty One & Sevens" was released on 14 January, followed by a music video for "Bright Enough" on 22 July.

I Killed the Prom Queen played on the 2015 Vans Warped Tour for all dates. In Trenches drummer Adrian Horsman began performing with the band at live shows from mid-2015 onwards.

In August 2017, in an Instagram comment to Weinhofen about the status of I Killed The Prom Queen, he said that playing guitar in a band isn't at the top of his priority list right now.

On 8 August 2018, the group announced they would be reuniting with their 'classic lineup' (featuring Crafter) for a one-off performance at the 2019 Unify Gathering festival, for the 15th anniversary of their debut album When Goodbye Means Forever.... However, two days later, Unify announced the band's appearance at the festival was cancelled due the unearthing of an "offensive" Facebook comment made two years prior by Crafter about gender equality in festival lineups. Crafter apologised for the comment and fans launched a petition to have the band re-added to the line-up, although Unify did not reverse the decision.

On February 26, 2021, the band shared a Facebook post from Weinhofen that announced the death of former bassist Sean Kennedy. Kennedy took his own life on February 24, 2021, at age 35.

In 2022 Michael Crafter and Confession performed songs from throughout I Killed the Prom Queen's two decade career, as well as Confession songs, on the When Goodbye Means It's Life and Death tour. The tour was a tribute in response to the passing of Sean Kennedy.

=== 25th anniversary reunion (2024–present) ===
In September 2024, the band released a video on their Instagram teasing a possible reunion in 2025.

On 10 April 2025, the band announced their 25th anniversary tour to take place in October, in which they will only play songs between 2000 and 2008. Emmure, To the Grave, and Threshold were announced as support.

== Band members ==
Current

- Jona Weinhofen – lead guitar, clean vocals, keyboards (2000–2007, 2008, 2011–2016, 2025–present)
- JJ Peters – drums (2000–2007, 2008, 2011–2013, 2025–present)
- Michael Crafter – lead vocals (2001–2006, 2008, 2025–present)
- Kevin Cameron – rhythm guitar (2002–2007, 2008, 2011–2016, 2025–present)
- Jamie Hope – bass, backing vocals (2025–present), lead vocals (2011–2016)

Former

- Lee Stacy – lead vocals (2000–2002)
- Simon O'Gorman – rhythm guitar, backing vocals (2000–2002)
- Ben Engel – bass (2000–2002)
- Leaton Rose – bass (2002–2003)
- Sean Kennedy – bass (2003–2007, 2008, 2011–2013; died 2021)
- Ed Butcher – lead vocals (2006–2007)
- Benjamin Coyte – bass guitar, backing vocals (2013–2016)
- Shane O'Brien – drums (2013–2016)

Timeline

== Discography ==
=== Studio albums ===
List of studio albums, with selected details and chart positions
Title	Album details	Peak chart positions
Title	Album details	AUS
When Goodbye Means Forever...	Released: December 2003; Label: Resist (RES029); Format: CD	86
Music for the Recently Deceased	Released: July 2006; Label: Stomp (STMPCD010); Formats: CD, digital, LP	27
Beloved	Released: February 2014; Label: Epitaph (87313-1); Formats: CD, digital, LP	6

=== Live albums ===
List of live albums, with selected details and chart positions
Title	Album details	Peak chart positions
Title	Album details	AUS
Sleepless Nights and City Lights	Released: November 2008; Format: CD+DVD, digital; Label: Stomp (STMPCD029)	48

=== Extended plays ===
List of EPs, with selected details
Title	Details
Choose to Love, Live or Die	Released: 2002; Format: CD; Label: 618 (618002)
Split CD (with Parkway Drive)	Released: May 2003; Format: CD; Label: Final Prayer (618004)
Your Past Comes Back to Haunt You	Released: March 2005; Format: CD; Label: Resist (RES039)

== Awards and nominations ==
=== AIR Awards ===
The Australian Independent Record Awards (commonly known informally as AIR Awards) is an annual awards night to recognise, promote and celebrate the success of Australia's Independent Music sector.

Year	Nominee / work	Award	Result
2009	Sleepless Nights & City Lights	Best Independent Hard Rock/Punk Album	Nominated
