= List of number-one digital albums of 2014 (Australia) =

ARIA Charts number-one digital albums of 2014 < 2013 2015 >

Other Australian number-one charts of 2014
- albums
- singles
- urban singles
- dance singles
- club tracks
- digital tracks
- streaming tracks

Top Australian singles and albums of 2014
- Triple J Hottest 100
- top 25 singles
- top 25 albums

The ARIA Albums Chart ranks the best-performing albums and extended plays (EPs) in Australia. Its data, published by the Australian Recording Industry Association, is based collectively on the weekly digital sales of albums and EPs.

== Chart history ==
Date	Album	Artist(s)	Ref.
6 January	Beyoncé	Beyoncé	
13 January	Beyoncé	Beyoncé	
20 January	Frozen	Various Artists	
27 January	Frozen	Various Artists	
3 February	True	Avicii	
10 February	MKTO	MKTO	
17 February	The Very Best	INXS	
24 February	The Very Best	INXS	
3 March	The Very Best	INXS	
10 March	Girl	Pharrell Williams	
17 March	Girl	Pharrell Williams	
24 March	O Vertigo!	Kate Miller-Heidke	
31 March	Recess	Skrillex	
7 April	Recess	Skrillex	
14 April	Puddinghead	Ball Park Music	
21 April	Built on Glass	Chet Faker	
28 April	Built on Glass	Chet Faker	
5 May	The New Classic	Iggy Azalea	
12 May	So We Can Remember	Thundamentals	
19 May	Turn Blue	The Black Keys	
26 May	Ghost Stories	Coldplay	
2 June	Ghost Stories	Coldplay	
9 June	Ghost Stories	Coldplay	
16 June	Let the Ocean Take Me	The Amity Affliction	
23 June	Ultraviolence	Lana Del Rey	
30 June	X	Ed Sheeran	
7 July	5 Seconds of Summer	5 Seconds of Summer	
14 July	1000 Forms of Fear	Sia	
21 July	Bombs Away	Sheppard	
28 July	Bombs Away	Sheppard	
4 August	X	Ed Sheeran	
11 August	Angus & Julia Stone	Angus & Julia Stone	
18 August	Walking Under Stars	Hilltop Hoods	
25 August	Guardians Of The Galaxy: Awesome Mix Vol. 1	Various Artists	
1 September	My Everything	Ariana Grande	
8 September	30:30 Hindsight	Jimmy Barnes	
15 September	Dream Your Life Away	Vance Joy	
22 September	Greetings from California	The Madden Brothers	
29 September	This Is All Yours	Alt-J	
6 October	X	Ed Sheeran	
13 October	X	Ed Sheeran	
20 October	Triple J's Like a Version Volume 10	Various Artists	
27 October	.5: The Gray Chapter	Slipknot	
3 November	1989	Taylor Swift	
10 November	1989	Taylor Swift	
17 November	Sonic Highways	Foo Fighters	
24 November	Four	One Direction	
1 December	The Veronicas	The Veronicas	
8 December	Rock or Bust	AC/DC	
15 December	1989	Taylor Swift	
22 December	1989	Taylor Swift	
29 December	Christmas	Michael Bublé	

== Number-one artists ==
Position	Artist	Weeks at No. 1
1	Ed Sheeran	4
1	Taylor Swift	4
2	Coldplay	3
2	INXS	3
3	Beyoncé	2
3	Chet Faker	2
3	Pharrell Williams	2
3	Sheppard	2
3	Skrillex	2
4	5 Seconds of Summer	1
4	AC/DC	1
4	Alt-J	1
4	The Amilty Affliction	1
4	Angus & Julia Stone	1
4	Ariana Grande	1
4	Avicii	1
4	Ball Park Music	1
4	The Black Keys	1
4	Foo Fighters	1
4	Hilltop Hoods	1
4	Jimmy Barnes	1
4	Kate Miller-Heidke	1
4	The Madden Brothers	1
4	MKTO	1
4	Michael Bublé	1
4	One Direction	1
4	Sia Furler	1
4	Slipknot	1
4	Thundamentals	1
4	Vance Joy	1
4	The Veronicas	1

== See also ==
- 2014 in music
- ARIA Charts
- List of number-one singles of 2014 (Australia)
