= List of number-one country albums of 2014 (Australia) =

ARIA Charts number-one country albums of 2014 < 2013 2015 >

Other Australian number-one charts of 2014
- albums
- singles
- urban singles
- dance singles
- club tracks
- digital tracks
- streaming tracks

Top Australian singles and albums of 2014
- Triple J Hottest 100
- top 25 singles
- top 25 albums

These are the Australian Country number-one albums of 2014, per the ARIA Charts.

Issue date	Album	Artist
6 January	Red	Taylor Swift
13 January	Fuse	Keith Urban
20 January	CMAA Winners 2014	Various artists
27 January	The Great Country Songbook	Troy Cassar-Daley & Adam Harvey
3 February	The Great Country Songbook	Troy Cassar-Daley & Adam Harvey
10 February	Blue Smoke	Dolly Parton
17 February	Blue Smoke	Dolly Parton
24 February	Blue Smoke	Dolly Parton
3 March	Blue Smoke	Dolly Parton
10 March	Blue Smoke	Dolly Parton
17 March	The Great Country Songbook	Troy Cassar-Daley & Adam Harvey
24 March	Morgan Evans	Morgan Evans
31 March	So Country 2014	Various artists
7 April	Out Among the Stars	Johnny Cash
14 April	Out Among the Stars	Johnny Cash
21 April	Out Among the Stars	Johnny Cash
28 April	Out Among the Stars	Johnny Cash
5 May	Out Among the Stars	Johnny Cash
12 May	Out Among the Stars	Johnny Cash
19 May	Fuse	Keith Urban
26 May	Rewind	Rascal Flatts
2 June	The Great Country Songbook	Troy Cassar-Daley & Adam Harvey
9 June	Fuse	Keith Urban
16 June	Platinum	Miranda Lambert
23 June	Fuse	Keith Urban
30 June	Fuse	Keith Urban
7 July	Fuse	Keith Urban
14 July	Here's To You & I	The McClymonts
21 July	Here's To You & I	The McClymonts
28 July	Here's To You & I	The McClymonts
4 August	Honest People	John Williamson
11 August	Honest People	John Williamson
18 August	My Side of the Street	Adam Brand
25 August	The Ray Hadley Country Music Collection Volume 3	Various artists
1 September	Family Life	Adam Harvey
8 September	Bittersweet	Kasey Chambers
15 September	Bittersweet	Kasey Chambers
22 September	Bittersweet	Kasey Chambers
29 September	Sundown Heaven Town	Tim McGraw
6 October	Sundown Heaven Town	Tim McGraw
13 October	747	Lady Antebellum
20 October	747	Lady Antebellum
27 October	747	Lady Antebellum
3 November	747	Lady Antebellum
10 November	Red	Taylor Swift
17 November	Great Women of Country	Melinda Schneider & Beccy Cole
24 November	Man Against Machine	Garth Brooks
1 December	Man Against Machine	Garth Brooks
8 December	Man Against Machine	Garth Brooks
15 December	Man Against Machine	Garth Brooks
22 December	Man Against Machine	Garth Brooks
29 December	Man Against Machine	Garth Brooks

== See also ==
- 2014 in music
- List of number-one albums of 2014 (Australia)
