= List of number-one urban albums of 2014 (Australia) =

ARIA Charts number-one urban albums of 2014 < 2013 2015 >

Other Australian number-one charts of 2014
- albums
- singles
- urban singles
- dance singles
- club tracks
- digital tracks
- streaming tracks

Top Australian singles and albums of 2014
- Triple J Hottest 100
- top 25 singles
- top 25 albums

This is a list of albums that reached number-one on the ARIA Urban Albums Chart in 2014. The ARIA Urban Albums Chart is a weekly chart that ranks the best-performing urban albums in Australia. It is published by the Australian Recording Industry Association (ARIA), an organisation that collects music data for the weekly ARIA Charts. To be eligible to appear on the chart, the recording must be an album of a predominantly urban nature.

== Chart history ==
Issue date	Album	Artist(s)	Reference
6 January	Beyoncé	Beyoncé	
13 January	Beyoncé	Beyoncé	
20 January	Beyoncé	Beyoncé	
27 January	Beyoncé	Beyoncé	
3 February	Beyoncé	Beyoncé	
10 February	Beyoncé	Beyoncé	
17 February	Beyoncé	Beyoncé	
24 February	The Marshall Mathers LP 2	Eminem	
3 March	The Marshall Mathers LP 2	Eminem	
10 March	Girl	Pharrell Williams	
17 March	Girl	Pharrell Williams	
24 March	Girl	Pharrell Williams	
31 March	Girl	Pharrell Williams	
7 April	Girl	Pharrell Williams	
14 April	Girl	Pharrell Williams	
21 April	Girl	Pharrell Williams	
28 April	Girl	Pharrell Williams	
5 May	Tattoos	Jason Derulo	
12 May	So We Can Remember	Thundamentals	
19 May	Xscape	Michael Jackson	
26 May	Xscape	Michael Jackson	
2 June	Xscape	Michael Jackson	
9 June	Xscape	Michael Jackson	
16 June	Xscape	Michael Jackson	
23 June	Utopia	360	
30 June	Utopia	360	
7 July	Utopia	360	
14 July	Startup Cult	Allday	
21 July	Utopia	360	
28 July	Utopia	360	
4 August	Utopia	360	
11 August	Mainline	One Day	
18 August	Walking Under Stars	Hilltop Hoods	
25 August	Walking Under Stars	Hilltop Hoods	
1 September	Walking Under Stars	Hilltop Hoods	
8 September	Walking Under Stars	Hilltop Hoods	
15 September	Walking Under Stars	Hilltop Hoods	
22 September	Walking Under Stars	Hilltop Hoods	
29 September	X	Chris Brown	
6 October	Walking Under Stars	Hilltop Hoods	
13 October	Walking Under Stars	Hilltop Hoods	
20 October	Walking Under Stars	Hilltop Hoods	
27 October	Walking Under Stars	Hilltop Hoods	
3 November	Walking Under Stars	Hilltop Hoods	
10 November	Walking Under Stars	Hilltop Hoods	
17 November	Walking Under Stars	Hilltop Hoods	
24 November	King	Kerser	
1 December	Shady XV	Various Artists	
8 December	Live by the Words	Justice Crew	
15 December	Walking Under Stars	Hilltop Hoods	
22 December	Walking Under Stars	Hilltop Hoods	
29 December	Walking Under Stars	Hilltop Hoods	

== See also ==
- 2014 in music
- List of number-one albums of 2014 (Australia)
