= Addicted to You (Avicii song) =

2013 song by Avicii

Single by Avicii

from the album True
- Released: 27 November 2013
- Genre: Dance-pop; soul
- Length: 2:28
- Label: PRMD Music; Universal Island
- Songwriters: Tim Bergling; Mac Davis; Josh Krajcik; Arash Pournouri
- Producers: Avicii; Arash Pournouri

Avicii singles chronology
| "Hey Brother" (2013) | "Addicted to You" (2013) | "Lay Me Down" (2014) |

"Addicted to You" is a song by Swedish DJ and record producer Avicii, incorporating vocals by American folk rock singer Audra Mae. The track was written by Avicii, Arash Pournouri, Mac Davis and Josh Krajcik for making appearance on Avicii's debut studio album, True (2013), with it being later released as its fourth single. "Addicted to You" first premiered to Australian radio on 23 November 2013; a digital single of "Addicted to You" remixes was released on 11 March 2014.

== Music video ==
The music video was directed by Sebastian Ringler and was shot in Gällivare and Vaxholm. It was released on February 14, 2014. It is inspired by the story of Bonnie and Clyde and set in the 1930s. The video begins by showing a woman working in a bar as a waitress (played by Swedish actress Madeleine Minou Martin). At the same time, a blond woman enters (played by Swedish actress Hedda Stiernstedt) and asks for a drink. She sips it and then throws the glass against the wall behind the bar. This is the signal for them to draw their guns and rob the place. After, they tour the snowy roads in a car. Arriving at night at home, they lie down on a bed while caressing passionately.

They subsequently decide to rob a bank, and in the process they stop and start kissing passionately at a table while the still-terrified bank clients watch. The blonde woman places an explosive on the door of the safe box, but the police arrive and a sniper shoots her dead. Finally, her grieving girlfriend decides to take revenge by taking the explosive off of the safe, running out to the waiting police officers, and suicidally blows them all up.

The video music was broadcast with a warning and blurring on some music channels due to violent content and blood presence in the clip in France.

== Track listing ==
- Digital download – remix
1. "Addicted to You" (David Guetta Remix) – 5:18
- Digital download – remixes
1. "Addicted to You" (Avicii by Avicii) – 5:31
2. "Addicted to You" (David Guetta Remix) – 5:18
3. "Addicted to You" (Sick Individuals Remix) – 5:00
4. "Addicted to You" (Albin Myers Remix) – 5:31
5. "Addicted to You" (Ashley Wallbridge Remix) – 4:51
6. "Addicted to You" (Bent Collective Remix) – 5:57

== Personnel ==
Musicians

- Audra Mae – vocals
- Tim Bergling – writer, producer
- Arash Pournouri – writer, producer

Additional personnel

- Mac Davis – writer
- Josh Krajcik – writer

== Charts ==
=== Weekly charts ===
| Chart (2013–2014) | Peak Position |
|---|---|
| Australia (ARIA) | 5 |
| Austria (Ö3 Austria Top 40) | 3 |
| Belgium (Ultratip Bubbling Under Flanders) | 5 |
| Belgium (Ultratop Flanders Dance) | 29 |
| Belgium (Ultratip Bubbling Under Wallonia) | 5 |
| Belgium (Ultratop Wallonia Dance) | 16 |
| Canada Hot 100 (Billboard) | 78 |
| CIS Airplay (TopHit) | 29 |
| Czech Republic Airplay (ČNS IFPI) | 1 |
| Czech Republic Singles Digital (ČNS IFPI) | 24 |
| Denmark (Tracklisten) | 27 |
| Finland (Suomen virallinen lista) | 12 |
| France (SNEP) | 6 |
| Germany (GfK) | 6 |
| Greece Digital Songs (Billboard) | 3 |
| Hungary (Dance Top 40) | 1 |
| Hungary (Rádiós Top 40) | 1 |
| Hungary (Single Top 40) | 4 |
| Ireland (IRMA) | 8 |
| Italy (FIMI) | 8 |
| Luxembourg Digital Songs (Billboard) | 3 |
| Netherlands (Dutch top 40) | 6 |
| Netherlands (Single Top 100) | 5 |
| New Zealand (Recorded Music NZ) | 6 |
| Norway (VG-lista) | 16 |
| Poland Airplay (ZPAV) | 1 |
| Poland Dance (ZPAV) | 8 |
| Romania (Romanian Top 100) | 75 |
| Russia Airplay (TopHit) | 24 |
| Scottish Singles Sales (Official Charts) | 12 |
| Slovakia Airplay (ČNS IFPI) | 5 |
| Slovakia Singles Digital (ČNS IFPI) | 26 |
| Slovenia (SloTop50) | 1 |
| Spain (Promusicae) | 29 |
| Sweden (Sverigetopplistan) | 11 |
| Switzerland (Schweizer Hitparade) | 5 |
| UK Dance (Official Charts) | 6 |
| UK Singles (Official Charts) | 14 |
| Ukraine Airplay (TopHit) | 13 |
| US Hot Dance/Electronic Songs (Billboard) | 11 |
| US Dance Club Songs (Billboard) | 1 |

=== Year-end charts ===
| Chart (2013) | Position |
|---|---|
| US Hot Dance/Electronic Songs (Billboard) | 85 |

| Chart (2014) | Position |
|---|---|
| Australia (ARIA) | 41 |
| Austria (Ö3 Austria Top 40) | 21 |
| Belgium (Ultratop Flanders) | 26 |
| Belgium (Ultratop Wallonia) | 22 |
| France (SNEP) | 22 |
| Germany (Official German Charts) | 23 |
| Hungary (Dance Top 40) | 12 |
| Hungary (Rádiós Top 40) | 40 |
| Hungary (Single Top 40) | 8 |
| Italy (FIMI) | 43 |
| Netherlands (Dutch Top 40) | 21 |
| Netherlands (Single Top 100) | 39 |
| New Zealand (Recorded Music NZ) | 42 |
| Poland (ZPAV) | 11 |
| Russia Airplay (TopHit) | 58 |
| Slovenia (SloTop50) | 6 |
| Sweden (Sverigetopplistan) | 47 |
| Switzerland (Schweizer Hitparade) | 31 |
| Ukraine Airplay (TopHit) | 159 |
| US Hot Dance/Electronic Songs (Billboard) | 38 |

| Chart (2018) | Position |
|---|---|
| Hungary (Rádiós Top 40) | 70 |

== Certifications and sales ==
| Region | Certification | Certified units/sales |
|---|---|---|
| Australia (ARIA) | 4× Platinum | 280,000^{‡} |
| Austria (IFPI Austria) | Gold | 15,000^{*} |
| Belgium (BRMA) | Gold | 15,000^{*} |
| Brazil (Pro-Música Brasil) | 2× Platinum | 120,000^{‡} |
| France | — | 59,600 |
| Germany (BVMI) | 3× Gold | 450,000^{‡} |
| Italy (FIMI) | Platinum | 30,000^{‡} |
| New Zealand (RMNZ) | Platinum | 15,000^{*} |
| Norway (IFPI Norway) | Platinum | 10,000^{‡} |
| Spain (Promusicae) | Gold | 30,000^{‡} |
| Sweden (GLF) | 3× Platinum | 120,000^{‡} |
| United Kingdom (BPI) | Platinum | 600,000^{‡} |
Streaming
| Denmark (IFPI Danmark) | Platinum | 2,600,000^{†} |
| Spain (Promusicae) | Gold | 4,000,000^{†} |
^{*} Sales figures based on certification alone.^{‡} Sales+streaming figures based on certification alone.^{†} Streaming-only figures based on certification alone.

== Release history ==
| Country | Date | Format | Label |
|---|---|---|---|
| Australia | 27 November 2013 | Contemporary hit radio | Universal Island |
| United States | 4 March 2014 | Dance radio | Island Def Jam |
| Germany | 11 March 2014 | Digital download (remixes) | PRMD; Avicii Music |
| United Kingdom | 11 March 2014 | Digital download (remixes) | PRMD; Avicii Music |
| United States | 11 March 2014 | Digital download (remixes) | PRMD; Avicii Music |
| United Kingdom | 7 April 2014 | Contemporary hit radio | PRMD |
| United States | 2 June 2014 | Adult album alternative | PRMD; Universal Island |
| United States | 3 June 2014 | Modern rock | PRMD; Universal Island |
| United States | 3 June 2014 | Contemporary hit radio | PRMD; Universal Island |
| United States | 3 June 2014 | Rhythmic contemporary | PRMD; Universal Island |

== See also ==
- List of number-one dance singles of 2014 (U.S.)
