= You Make Me =

Single by Avicii

from the album True
- Released: 30 August 2013
- Recorded: 2013
- Length: 3:53
- Label: PRMD; Universal Island
- Songwriters: Salem Al Fakir; Tim Bergling; Vincent Pontare; Arash Pournouri
- Producers: Avicii; Arash Pournouri

Avicii singles chronology
"Wake Me Up" (2013)	"You Make Me" (2013)	"Hey Brother" (2013)

"You Make Me" is a song by the Swedish DJ and record producer Avicii. The song has unlisted/uncredited vocals from Swedish musician and singer Salem Al Fakir in collaboration with Swedish songwriter Vincent Pontare. It was produced for Avicii's debut studio album, True and appears as the second track on the album. The song was released as the second single from True on 30 August 2013 as a follow-up to "Wake Me Up". The single made its worldwide debut on BBC Radio 1's The Pete Tong Show on 16 August.

"You Make Me" is written in E flat minor and runs at 125 beats per minute.

== Music video ==
A lyric video for "You Make Me" made by Jesper Eriksson was uploaded to Avicii's VEVO YouTube account on 30 August 2013. The video depicted city scenes (from, among others, Bangkok, Bochum, Chicago and Tokyo) heavily using the miniature photography technique.

The official music video, directed by Sebastian Ringler, premiered on the same channel on 16 September 2013. The video is described by Vevo where "down at the skate rink a little bit of jealousy explodes into ninja battle".

== Track listings ==
Digital download

1. "You Make Me" – 3:53

Digital download – Remixes

1. "You Make Me" (Extended Mix) – 5:18
2. "You Make Me" (Throttle Remix) – 4:45
3. "You Make Me" (Diplo and Ookay Remix) – 4:07

== Commercial performance ==
"You Make Me" debuted at number five on the UK Singles Chart, one place above Avicii's previous single, "Wake Me Up!", in that week. It remained at number five for a second week. It also debuted at number one on the UK Dance Chart, dethroning "Wake Me Up!" from the top spot.

== Charts ==
=== Weekly charts ===
Chart (2013–2014)	Peak position
Australia (ARIA)	12
Austria (Ö3 Austria Top 40)	7
Belgium (Ultratop 50 Flanders)	20
Belgium (Ultratop 50 Wallonia)	26
Canada Hot 100 (Billboard)	44
Czech Republic Airplay (ČNS IFPI)	79
Denmark (Tracklisten)	34
Finland (Suomen virallinen lista)	4
France (SNEP)	58
Germany (GfK)	34
Hungary (Dance Top 40)	5
Hungary (Rádiós Top 40)	7
Hungary (Single Top 40)	10
Ireland (IRMA)	10
Italy (FIMI)	62
Mexico Anglo (Monitor Latino)	1
Netherlands (Dutch Top 40)	20
Netherlands (Single Top 100)	29
New Zealand (Recorded Music NZ)	32
Norway (VG-lista)	6
Poland Dance (ZPAV)	21
Romania (Romanian Top 100)	76
Scottish Singles Sales (Official Charts)	3
Spain (Promusicae)	42
Sweden (Sverigetopplistan)	1
Switzerland (Schweizer Hitparade)	29
UK Singles (Official Charts)	5
UK Dance (Official Charts)	1
US Billboard Hot 100	85
US Hot Dance/Electronic Songs (Billboard)	11
US Dance Club Songs (Billboard)	7

=== Year-end charts ===
Chart (2013)	Position
Hungary (Dance Top 40)	38
Hungary (Rádiós Top 40)	72
Netherlands (Dutch Top 40)	124
Netherlands (Single Top 100)	89
Sweden (Sverigetopplistan)	29
UK Singles (Official Charts Company)	79
US Hot Dance/Electronic Songs (Billboard)	44
Chart (2014)	Position
Hungary (Dance Top 40)	38
Sweden (Sverigetopplistan)	90
US Hot Dance/Electronic Songs (Billboard)	44

== Certifications ==
Certifications for "You Make Me"
Region	Certification	Certified units/sales
Australia (ARIA)	2× Platinum	140,000^{‡}
Brazil (Pro-Música Brasil)	Platinum	60,000^{‡}
Germany (BVMI)	Gold	150,000^{‡}
Italy (FIMI)	Gold	15,000^{‡}
Netherlands (NVPI)	2× Platinum	40,000^{^}
New Zealand (RMNZ)	Gold	7,500^{*}
Norway (IFPI Norway)	2× Platinum	20,000^{‡}
Spain (Promusicae)	Gold	30,000^{‡}
Sweden (GLF)	4× Platinum	160,000^{‡}
United Kingdom (BPI)	Platinum	600,000^{‡}
United States (RIAA)	Gold	500,000^{‡}
Streaming
Denmark (IFPI Danmark)	Platinum	1,800,000^{†}
Spain (Promusicae)	Gold	4,000,000^{†}
^{*} Sales figures based on certification alone.^{^} Shipments figures based on certification alone.^{‡} Sales+streaming figures based on certification alone.^{†} Streaming-only figures based on certification alone.

== Release history ==
Country	Date	Format	Label
Australia	30 August 2013	Digital download	Universal Music
New Zealand	30 August 2013	Digital download	Universal Music
Russia	30 August 2013	Digital download	Universal Music
United Kingdom	15 September 2013	Digital download	Universal Music
