= Hey Brother =

2013 song by Avicii

Single by Avicii

from the album True
- Released: 28 October 2013
- Recorded: 2012–2013
- Genre: Progressive house; country pop
- Length: 4:14 (album version); 3:13 (radio edit)
- Label: PRMD; Universal
- Songwriters: Salem Al Fakir; Tim Bergling; Veronica Maggio; Vincent Pontare; Ash Pournouri
- Producer: Avicii

Avicii singles chronology
"You Make Me" (2013)	"Hey Brother" (2013)	"Addicted to You" (2013)

Music video
- "Hey Brother" on YouTube

Music video
- "Hey Brother (lyric version)" on YouTube

Professional ratings
Review scores
Source	Rating
Digital Spy	4/5 stars

"Hey Brother" is a dance song by Swedish DJ and record producer Avicii from his debut studio album, True (2013). American bluegrass singer Dan Tyminski provides vocals for the track. It was written by Avicii, Ash Pournouri, Salem Al Fakir, Vincent Pontare and Veronica Maggio. "Hey Brother" sees Avicii giving his brother advice.

The song, which was the album's third single, was released to Australian radio on 9 October 2013 and later released on 28 October in Germany, Switzerland and Austria. In April 2014, a version of the track remixed by Avicii himself was released on his remix album True (Avicii by Avicii), this time featuring new vocals from singer Salem Al Fakir.

== Music composition ==
The song is set to a tempo of 125 beats per minute, and the time signature is irregular, changing from common time to 6/4 at certain intervals. As to the key signature, it is set to B flat major.

== Lyric video ==
On 1 November 2013, the lyric video for "Hey Brother" was released onto YouTube by AviciiOfficialVEVO. The video is an assortment of stock footage clips in slow motion that depict everyday moments such as popcorn popping, a woman having a snack, and people playing basketball, accompanied by an animated text representation of the lyrics.

== Music video ==
The official music video, directed by Jesse Sternbaum, was released on 9 December 2013. Loosely based on Ron Franscell's 1998 literary novel Angel Fire, it follows two brothers growing up in wartime middle America. There are pictures and clips of the Vietnam War interspersed in the video. In the end, it is uncovered that the older brother, who is implied to have died in Vietnam, was in fact actually the younger's father, as the boy thought of him as the brother that he didn't have. It features two boys, the older boy played by Zach Voss and the younger boy played by Jack Estes. The end of the video shows Avicii walking through the grass while fireflies are flying around.

A music video was also released for the Avicii by Avicii version on 9 April 2014 on Avicii's VEVO page. The video was directed by Nick Fung and Nate Olson and features clips from the Cartoon Hangover web-series Bravest Warriors. The video was released as part of "Channel 4", a project by Avicii which had several songs from his True (Avicii by Avicii) album made into music videos by various YouTube filmmakers and animators, which included Joe Penna, Keshen8, and YoMama, as well as Cartoon Hangover.

== Track listing ==
- CD single
1. "Hey Brother" (radio edit) – 4:14
2. "Hey Brother" (instrumental) – 4:14
- Digital download — remixes
1. "Hey Brother" (Syn Cole remix) – 5:00
2. "Hey Brother" (extended version) – 5:30
- True (Avicii by Avicii)
1. "Hey Brother (Avicii by Avicii)" – 6:09

== Commercial performance ==
In the United Kingdom, after climbing for several weeks, "Hey Brother" peaked at number two on the UK Singles Chart on 15 December 2013 ― for the week ending dated 21 December 2013 ― being held off the top spot by Lily Allen's cover of "Somewhere Only We Know". It eventually spent 22 weeks in the top 40 ― 10 of which were in the top 10. In addition, "Hey Brother" peaked at the top of the UK Dance Chart. Including previous releases "I Could Be the One", "Wake Me Up" and "You Make Me", Avicii therefore reached the summit of the UK Dance Chart four times in 2013 alone. The song spent a total of six weeks at the top spot on the UK Dance Chart, ended by "Rather Be" by Clean Bandit featuring Jess Glynne.

In the United States, the song entered the Billboard Hot 100 chart at number 77 in December 2013. It continued climbing and rose to number 16 in March 2014, and reached a million in total sales that week. After Clear Channel personnel noticed the song's success at pop and adult pop radio, they asked Island Def Jam to craft a remix that showcases the song's instruments more prominently. Support for this remix enabled "Hey Brother" to debut, and peak, at number 59 on Billboard's Country Airplay chart in March 2014. The song would become Avicii's final song to hit the top 40 before his death in 2018.

== Charts ==
=== Weekly charts ===
Initial weekly chart performance
Chart (2013–2015)	Peak position
Australia (ARIA)	2
Austria (Ö3 Austria Top 40)	1
Belgium (Ultratop 50 Flanders)	3
Belgium Dance (Ultratop Flanders)	3
Belgium (Ultratop 50 Wallonia)	1
Belgium Dance (Ultratop Wallonia)	1
Brazil (Billboard Brasil Hot 100)	29
Brazil Hot Pop Songs (Billboard Brasil)	8
Canada Hot 100 (Billboard)	10
CIS Airplay (TopHit)	19
Colombia (National-Report)	21
Czech Republic Airplay (ČNS IFPI)	1
Czech Republic Singles Digital (ČNS IFPI)	14
Denmark (Tracklisten)	2
Finland (Suomen virallinen lista)	1
Finnish Airplay (Radiosoittolista)	3
France (SNEP)	1
Germany (GfK)	1
Hungary (Rádiós Top 40)	1
Hungary (Single Top 40)	1
Hungary (Dance Top 40)	1
Ireland (IRMA)	2
Italy (FIMI)	3
Japan Hot 100 (Billboard)	83
Mexico Anglo (Monitor Latino)	5
Netherlands (Dutch Top 40)	1
Netherlands (Single Top 100)	2
Netherlands (Mega Dance Top 30)	1
New Zealand (Recorded Music NZ)	4
Norway (VG-lista)	1
Poland Airplay (ZPAV)	1
Poland Dance (ZPAV)	6
Romania (Airplay 100)	4
Scottish Singles Sales (Official Charts)	1
Slovakia Airplay (ČNS IFPI)	1
Slovakia Singles Digital (ČNS IFPI)	24
Slovenia (SloTop50)	1
South Africa Airplay (EMA)	2
Spain (Promusicae)	1
Sweden (Sverigetopplistan)	1
Switzerland (Schweizer Hitparade)	1
UK Singles (Official Charts)	2
UK Dance (Official Charts)	1
US Billboard Hot 100	16
US Adult Pop Airplay (Billboard)	19
US Country Airplay (Billboard)	59
US Dance Club Songs (Billboard)	1
US Hot Dance/Electronic Songs (Billboard)	1
US Pop Airplay (Billboard)	10
US Rock & Alternative Airplay (Billboard)	27

Weekly chart performance following Avicii's death
Chart (2018)	Peak position
Portugal (AFP)	63
US Hot Dance/Electronic Songs (Billboard)	7

=== Year-end charts ===
Annual chart rankings
Chart (2013)	Position
Australia (ARIA)	28
Australia Dance (ARIA)	4
Austria (Ö3 Austria Top 40)	24
Belgium (Ultratop 50 Flanders)	86
Belgium Dance (Ultratop Flanders)	67
Belgium Dance (Ultratop Wallonia)	73
France (SNEP)	66
Germany (Media Control AG)	18
Hungary (Dance Top 40)	51
Hungary (Rádiós Top 40)	49
Ireland (IRMA)	15
Netherlands (Dutch Top 40)	35
Netherlands (Single Top 100)	25
Netherlands Dance (Mega Dance Top 50)	6
Slovenia (SloTop50)	47
Sweden (Sverigetopplistan)	8
Switzerland (Schweizer Hitparade)	37
UK Singles (Official Charts Company)	82
US Hot Dance/Electronic Songs (Billboard)	50
Chart (2014)	Position
Australia (ARIA)	79
Australia Dance (ARIA)	14
Austria (Ö3 Austria Top 40)	49
Belgium (Ultratop 50 Flanders)	23
Belgium Dance (Ultratop Flanders)	39
Belgium (Ultratop 50 Wallonia)	17
Belgium Dance (Ultratop Wallonia)	20
Brazil (Crowley)	33
Canada (Canadian Hot 100)	25
Denmark (Tracklisten)	50
France (SNEP)	40
Germany (Official German Charts)	60
Hungary (Dance Top 40)	8
Hungary (Rádiós Top 40)	28
Hungary (Single Top 40)	14
Italy (FIMI)	16
Netherlands (Dutch Top 40)	32
Netherlands (Single Top 100)	48
Netherlands Dance (Mega Dance Top 50)	8
New Zealand (Recorded Music NZ)	24
Poland (ZPAV)	38
Romania (Airplay 100)	7
Russia Airplay (Tophit)	171
Slovenia (SloTop50)	13
Spain (PROMUSICAE)	6
Sweden (Sverigetopplistan)	25
Switzerland (Schweizer Hitparade)	15
Ukraine Airplay (Tophit)	95
UK Singles (Official Charts Company)	24
US Billboard Hot 100	60
US Dance Club Songs (Billboard)	48
US Hot Dance/Electronic Songs (Billboard)	7
Chart (2018)	Position
US Hot Dance/Electronic Songs (Billboard)	94

=== Decade-end charts ===
Decade-end chart performance
Chart (2010–2019)	Position
US Hot Dance/Electronic Songs (Billboard)	36

== Certifications ==
Sales certifications
Region	Certification	Certified units/sales
Australia (ARIA)	8× Platinum	560,000^{‡}
Austria (IFPI Austria)	Platinum	30,000^{*}
Belgium (BRMA)	Platinum	30,000^{*}
Brazil (Pro-Música Brasil)	4× Diamond	1,000,000^{‡}
Canada (Music Canada)	Gold	40,000^{*}
Germany (BVMI)	2× Platinum	600,000^{‡}
Italy (FIMI)	3× Platinum	90,000^{‡}
Netherlands (NVPI)	3× Platinum	60,000^{^}
New Zealand (RMNZ)	4× Platinum	120,000^{‡}
Norway (IFPI Norway)	5× Platinum	50,000^{‡}
Portugal (AFP)	Gold	10,000^{‡}
Spain (Promusicae)	2× Platinum	80,000^{‡}
Sweden (GLF)	7× Platinum	280,000^{‡}
Switzerland (IFPI Switzerland)	Platinum	30,000^{^}
United Kingdom (BPI)	3× Platinum	1,800,000
United States (RIAA)	4× Platinum	4,000,000
Streaming
Denmark (IFPI Danmark)	3× Platinum	5,400,000^{†}
Spain (Promusicae)	Platinum	8,000,000^{†}
^{*} Sales figures based on certification alone.^{^} Shipments figures based on certification alone.^{‡} Sales+streaming figures based on certification alone.^{†} Streaming-only figures based on certification alone.

== Release history ==
Street dates
Country	Date	Format	Label
Australia	9 October 2013	Contemporary hit radio	Universal Island
Austria	28 October 2013	CD single	PRMD; Universal
Germany	28 October 2013	CD single	PRMD; Universal
Switzerland	28 October 2013	CD single	PRMD; Universal
United States	18 November 2013	Triple A radio	Universal Island
United States	19 November 2013	Contemporary hit radio	Universal Island
Italy	29 November 2013	Contemporary hit radio	Universal
United States	10 December 2013	Alternative radio	Universal Island

== See also ==
- List of number-one dance singles of 2014 (U.S.)
