= Lay Me Down (Avicii song) =

Single by Avicii

from the album True
- Released: April 21, 2014
- Recorded: 2013
- Genre: Progressive house; nu-disco; funktronica
- Length: 5:00 (album version); 3:26 (radio edit)
- Label: PRMD; Island
- Songwriters: Tim Bergling; Adam Lambert; Arash Pournouri; Nile Rodgers
- Producers: Avicii; Arash Pournouri; Nile Rodgers

Avicii singles chronology
"Addicted to You" (2013)	"Lay Me Down" (2014)	"Dar um Jeito (We Will Find a Way)" (2014)

Music video
- "Lay Me Down" on YouTube

"Lay Me Down" is a song by Swedish DJ and record producer Avicii. Written by Avicii, Ash Pournouri, Nile Rodgers and Adam Lambert, the track appears on Avicii's debut studio album, True (2013). American singer-songwriter Adam Lambert also provides vocals for the track, while Nile Rodgers provides guitar backing. The track was released as the fifth single from his album on April 21, 2014.

== Personnel ==
Musicians

- Adam Lambert – vocals
- Tim Bergling – composition, production
- Ash Pournouri – composition, production
- Nile Rodgers – guitar, production

Additional personnel

- Nile Rodgers – composition
- Adam Lambert – composition

== Live performances ==
On The Original High Tour Lambert performed the song, stating: "Most of you might not be aware of this song, but for whatever reason my name wasn't on the title".

== Charts ==
=== Weekly charts ===
Chart (2013–14)	Peak position
Australia (ARIA)	34
Austria (Ö3 Austria Top 40)	17
Belgium (Ultratip Bubbling Under Flanders)	4
Belgium Dance (Ultratop Flanders)	30
Belgium (Ultratip Bubbling Under Wallonia)	2
Belgium Dance (Ultratop Wallonia)	4
France (SNEP)	47
Germany (GfK)	35
Hungary (Dance Top 40)	8
Hungary (Rádiós Top 40)	3
Hungary (Single Top 40)	5
Ireland (IRMA)	94
Poland Airplay (ZPAV)	14
Poland Dance (ZPAV)	1
Slovakia Airplay (ČNS IFPI)	56
Slovenia (SloTop50)	14
Sweden (Sverigetopplistan)	39
Switzerland (Schweizer Hitparade)	41
UK Dance (Official Charts)	29
US Hot Dance/Electronic Songs (Billboard)	22

=== Year-end charts ===
Chart (2014)	Position
France (SNEP)	150
Hungary (Dance Top 40)	34
Hungary (Rádiós Top 40)	32
Hungary (Single Top 40)	61

Chart (2015)	Position
Hungary (Dance Top 40)	49

== Certifications ==
Region	Certification	Certified units/sales
Sweden (GLF)	Gold	20,000^{‡}
^{‡} Sales+streaming figures based on certification alone.

== Release history ==
Country	Date	Format	Label
Australia	21 April 2014	Contemporary hit radio	Universal Music
United Kingdom	14 July 2014	Contemporary hit radio	Universal Music
