= Dan Tyminski =

American bluegrass musician (born 1967)

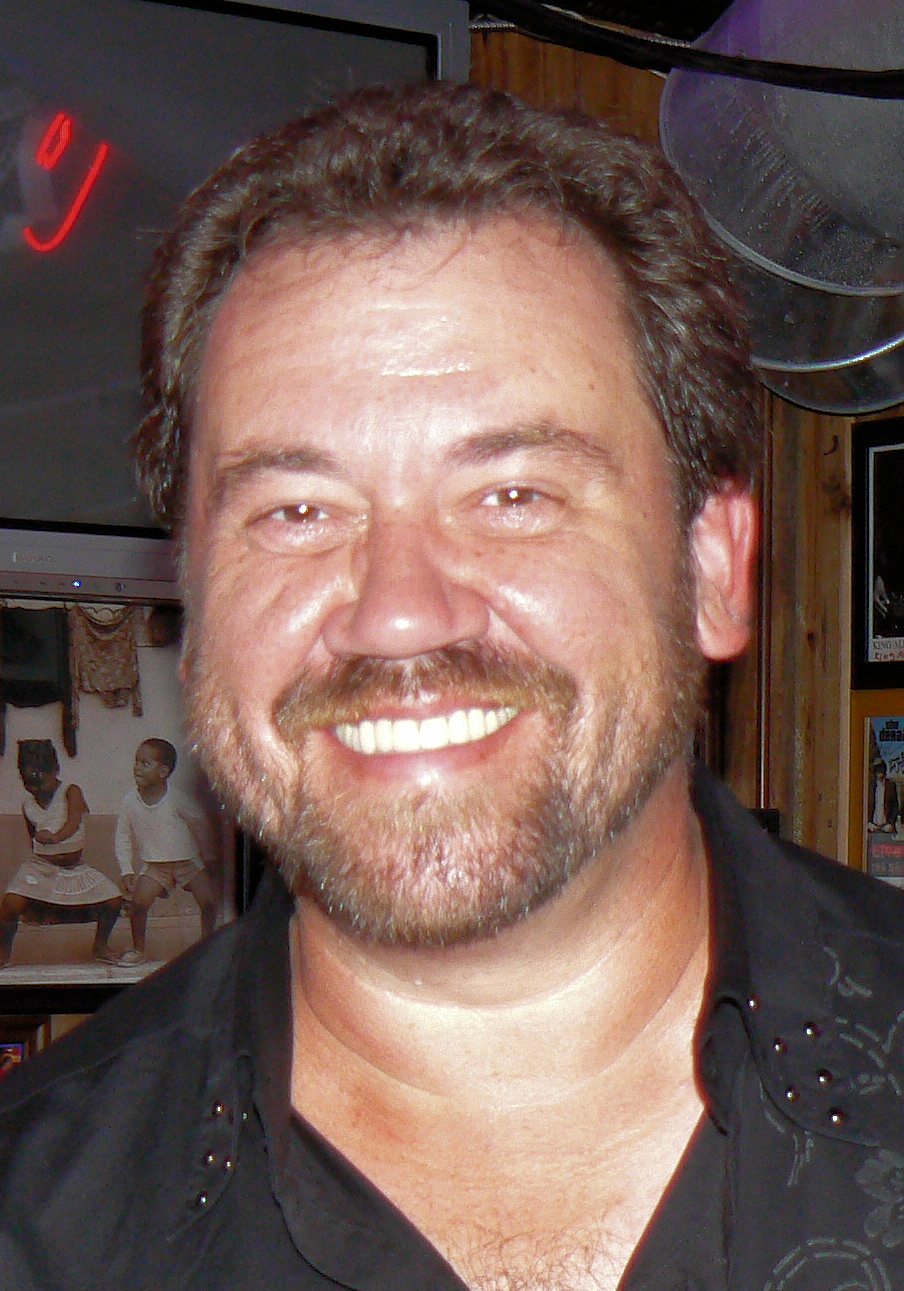
- Tyminski in October 2010

Background information
- Born: Daniel John Tyminski; June 20, 1967 (age 59); Rutland, Vermont, U.S.
- Genre: Bluegrass
- Occupations: Singer; musician
- Years active: 1988–present
- Labels: Doobie Shea; Rounder
- Website: tyminskimusic.com

Daniel John Tyminski (born June 20, 1967) is an American bluegrass singer-songwriter and musician. He is a former member of Alison Krauss's band Union Station, and has released four solo albums: Carry Me Across the Mountain (2000), Wheels (2008), Southern Gothic (2017), and God Fearing Heathen (2023).

He is known for his updated version of the song "Man of Constant Sorrow," which was featured in the movie O Brother, Where Art Thou? and won the 2001 CMA award for best single as well as a Grammy Award for best Country Collaboration with Vocals (along with Harley Allen and Pat Enright, filling out the vocals for the movie's Soggy Bottom Boys). In total, he has won 14 Grammy Awards for solo and collaborative projects. In 2013, he was the vocalist on Avicii's international hit "Hey Brother" from the album True. Tyminski received the Bluegrass Star Award from the Bluegrass Heritage Foundation of Dallas, Texas, in 2021. The award is bestowed upon bluegrass artists who do an exemplary job of advancing traditional bluegrass music while preserving its character and heritage.

== Early life ==
Tyminski was born in Rutland, Vermont, to Patricia (née Wood) and Stanley J. "Stosh" Tyminski Sr., an automobile mechanic.

== Career ==
In July 2009 the Martin Guitar Company issued, as part of their Custom Artist Series, a D28 Dreadnought acoustic guitar in recognition of Dan's life devoted to performing bluegrass and old-time music. The guitar, named Martin D-28 Dan Tyminski Custom Edition, was issued with its own distinctive details to appeal to flatpickers.

At the Ultra Music Festival 2013, he premiered a new single, "Hey Brother", as part of a country-electronic collaboration with Swedish producer Avicii. The song was a Top 5 hit in more than 15 countries, including Australia, Austria, Belgium, Denmark, Finland, Germany, the Netherlands, New Zealand, Norway, Sweden, Switzerland, Slovakia, Macedonia and the United Kingdom. In May 2024, "Hey Brother" surpassed one billion streams on the Spotify streaming platform.

In 2017, Tyminski released a new solo album, Southern Gothic, through Mercury Records Nashville. The lead single was "Bloodline". The bluegrass album, God Fearing Heathen, was released on 23 June 2023, featuring a bluegrass styled re-release of "Hey Brother" .

Tyminski is an avid golfer, and was named to Golf Digest's "Top 100 Golfers in Music." He regularly competes at celebrity golf tournaments, including the Monday After the Masters tournament in Myrtle Beach, SC, the Murray Bros. Caddyshack tournament in St. Augustine, FL, and The Vinny golf tournament in Nashville, TN.

== Personal life ==
Daniel Tyminski's first wife is named Elise Tyminski, a nurse in Tennessee. Elise and Dan had three children together, John, Chris, and Kathryn.

After their divorce, many years later, Tyminski married Kathryn Newland on November 24, 2022 where he gained three step-children. Rhys Ammon, 22, a collegiate athlete at Appalachian State University where she runs cross-country. Vaughn Ammon, 26, was a collegiate swimmer, and now works for Backroads, an outdoor recreation company based out of Salt Lake City, Utah. Evan Ammon, 29, is a stay-at-home father to one child.

== Discography ==
=== Albums ===
Title	Album details	Peak chart positions			Sales
Title	Album details	US Grass	US Country	US Heat	Sales
Carry Me Across the Mountain	Release date: June 27, 2000; Label: Doobie Shea; Format: Digital download, CD	—	—	—	
Wheels	Release date: June 17, 2008; Label: Rounder Records; Format: Digital download, CD	1	32	10	
Southern Gothic	Release date: October 20, 2017; Label: Mercury Nashville; Format: Digital download, CD	—	23	8	US: 2,500
God Fearing Heathen	Release date: June 23, 2023; Label: 8 Track Entertainment; Format: Digital download, CD	1	—	—	
"—" denotes an album that did not chart or was not released.

=== Singles ===
Year	Single	Album
2017	"Bloodline"	Southern Gothic
2017	"Southern Gothic"	Southern Gothic

=== As featured artist ===
List of singles as featured artist, with selected chart positions and certifications, showing year released and album name
Title	Year	Peak chart positions											Certifications	Album
Title	Year	US	AUS	AUT	DEN	GER	NL	NOR	NZ	SWE	SWI	UK	Certifications	Album
"Hey Brother" (Avicii featuring Dan Tyminski)	2013	16	2	1	4	1	1	1	4	1	2	2	IFPI SWE: 2× Platinum; ARIA: Platinum; BPI: Silver; BVMI: Gold; IFPI SWI: Gold	True
"Heaven On Your Mind" (Kygo featuring Dan Tyminski)	2026	—	—	—	—	—	—	60	—	90	—	—		TBA
"—" denotes a recording that did not chart or was not released in that territory.
