= Mt Adams Music Festival =

- Location: Mount Adams, Cincinnati
- Years active: 2006-

The Mt Adams Music Festival is an outdoor music festival held annually in Mount Adams, Cincinnati, Ohio. Sponsored by the Mt Adams Business Guild the event has been an annual success since 2006.

== Venue ==
Originally located in the parking lot of Towne Properties overlooking Downtown Cincinnati, the event was moved in 2008 to the closed streets of the neighborhood to accommodate the growing crowds. Born out of the rich arts and entertainment history of Mt. Adams, this event is a showcase of up and coming local, national, and international talent. The Mt. Adams Music Festival is produced annually by the event's founder, Joe Kendrick and sponsored by the Mt Adams Business/Tavern Guild. Held on the narrow 19th century neighborhood streets, the event has excellent acoustics and ambiance producing many unique and memorable performances.

== Notable Performers ==
2011 Alberta Cross, Buffalo Killers, One Horse

2010 New Medicine, Autovaughn, Josh Krajcik, Buffalo Killers, Gran Bel Fisher

2009 Shiny Toy Guns, Framing Hanley, Josh Krajcik, Rusty Bladen,

2008 Fiction Plane, Rusty Bladen, LoFi, Austin Speigel

2007 Rusty Bladen, Gran Bel Fisher, Josh Krajcik, Kate Voegele, Bluf, Ricky Nye

2006 Rusty Bladen, Griffin House (musician)
