= List of number-one urban albums of 2015 (Australia) =

ARIA Charts number-one urban albums of 2015 < 2014 2016 >

Other Australian number-one charts of 2015
- albums
- singles
- urban singles
- dance singles
- club tracks
- digital tracks
- streaming tracks

Top Australian singles and albums of 2015
- Triple J Hottest 100
- top 25 singles
- top 25 albums

This is a list of albums that reached number-one on the ARIA Urban Albums Chart in 2015. The ARIA Urban Albums Chart is a weekly chart that ranks the best-performing urban albums in Australia. It is published by the Australian Recording Industry Association (ARIA), an organisation that collects music data for the weekly ARIA Charts. To be eligible to appear on the chart, the recording must be an album of a predominantly urban nature.

== Chart history ==
Issue date	Album	Artist(s)	Reference
5 January	Walking Under Stars	Hilltop Hoods	
12 January	Walking Under Stars	Hilltop Hoods	
19 January	Walking Under Stars	Hilltop Hoods	
26 January	Uptown Special	Mark Ronson	
2 February	Uptown Special	Mark Ronson	
9 February	Uptown Special	Mark Ronson	
16 February	Uptown Special	Mark Ronson	
23 February	If You're Reading This It's Too Late	Drake	
2 March	If You're Reading This It's Too Late	Drake	
9 March	Fan of a Fan: The Album	Chris Brown and Tyga	
16 March	Walking Under Stars	Hilltop Hoods	
23 March	To Pimp a Butterfly	Kendrick Lamar	
30 March	To Pimp a Butterfly	Kendrick Lamar	
6 April	To Pimp a Butterfly	Kendrick Lamar	
13 April	To Pimp a Butterfly	Kendrick Lamar	
20 April	To Pimp a Butterfly	Kendrick Lamar	
27 April	To Pimp a Butterfly	Kendrick Lamar	
4 May	To Pimp a Butterfly	Kendrick Lamar	
11 May	To Pimp a Butterfly	Kendrick Lamar	
18 May	Walking Under Stars	Hilltop Hoods	
25 May	To Pimp a Butterfly	Kendrick Lamar	
1 June	At. Long. Last. ASAP	ASAP Rocky	
8 June	At. Long. Last. ASAP	ASAP Rocky	
15 June	Strange New Past	Seth Sentry	
22 June	Strange New Past	Seth Sentry	
29 June	Strange New Past	Seth Sentry	
6 July	Strange New Past	Seth Sentry	
13 July	Wildheart	Miguel	
20 July	Walking Under Stars	Hilltop Hoods	
27 July	Walking Under Stars	Hilltop Hoods	
3 August	Southpaw	Various Artists	
10 August	To Pimp a Butterfly	Kendrick Lamar	
17 August	Compton	Dr. Dre	
24 August	Compton	Dr. Dre	
31 August	Compton	Dr. Dre	
7 September	Beauty Behind the Madness	The Weeknd	
14 September	Beauty Behind the Madness	The Weeknd	
21 September	Beauty Behind the Madness	The Weeknd	
28 September	What a Time to Be Alive	Drake and Future	
5 October	Beauty Behind the Madness	The Weeknd	
12 October	Beauty Behind the Madness	The Weeknd	
19 October	Beauty Behind the Madness	The Weeknd	
26 October	Beauty Behind the Madness	The Weeknd	
2 November	Beauty Behind the Madness	The Weeknd	
9 November	R&B Fridays	Various artists	
16 November	R&B Fridays	Various artists	
23 November	R&B Fridays	Various artists	
30 November	R&B Fridays	Various artists	
7 December	R&B Fridays	Various artists	
14 December	R&B Fridays	Various artists	
21 December	R&B Fridays	Various artists	
28 December	R&B Fridays	Various artists	

== See also ==
- 2015 in music
- List of number-one albums of 2015 (Australia)
