= Wheels (Dan Tyminski album) =

Studio album by Dan Tyminski
- Released: June 17, 2008
- Genre: Bluegrass
- Length: 36:27
- Label: Rounder

Dan Tyminski chronology
Carry Me Across the Mountain (2000)	Wheels (2008)

Wheels is the third studio album by American bluegrass musician Dan Tyminski. The album peaked at number 1 on the Top Bluegrass Albums chart. It won the 2009 International Bluegrass Music Award for Album of the Year and was nominated for a Grammy Award.

== Background ==
Wheels was released on Rounder Records as part of the Dan Tyminski band in 2008, during a break from playing with the Lonesome River Band. Tyminski played Martin and Bourgeois guitars and Sim Daley played mandolins. Additional personnel includes Adam Steffey on mandolin and Barry Bales on bass. The album won the 2009 International Bluegrass Music Award for Album of the Year and was also nominated for a Grammy.

== Track listing ==
No.	Title	Writer(s)	Length
1.	"Wheels"	Patrick McDougal	2:58
2.	"Whose Shoulder Will You Cry On"	Kitty Wells, Billy Wallace	2:21
3.	"Making Hay"	Craig Market	3:57
4.	"Who Showed Who"	Harold Tipton	3:22
5.	"It All Comes Down to You"	Ron Block	2:40
6.	"How Long Is This Train"	Tim Stafford	2:57
7.	"I Ain't Taking You Back No More"	Ron Stewart	2:56
8.	"Heads You Win Tails I Lose"	Daren Shumaker, Craig Market	3:41
9.	"How Many Times"	Dan Tyminski	2:31
10.	"The One You Lean On"		2:42
11.	"Knock Knock!"	Adam Steffey	1:53
12.	"Some Early Morning"		4:29

== Personnel ==
- Barry Bales - bass, vocals
- Ron Block - guitar
- Vince Gill - vocals
- Adam Steffey - mandolin
- Justin Moses - banjo, fiddle, resonator guitar, vocals
- Ron Stewart - fiddle, banjo
- Cheryl White - vocals
- Sharon White - vocals
- Dan Tyminski - guitar, vocals

== Chart performance ==
Chart (2008)	Peak position
US Top Bluegrass Albums (Billboard)	1
US Top Country Albums (Billboard)	32
US Heatseekers Albums (Billboard)	10
