= True (Avicii album) =

2013 studio album by Avicii

Studio album by Avicii
- Released: 13 September 2013
- Recorded: 2011–2013
- Genres: EDM; country; house; soul; bluegrass
- Length: 46:56
- Labels: PRMD; Island
- Producers: Tim Bergling; Arash Pournouri; Nile Rodgers

Avicii chronology
The Singles (2011)	True (2013)	True (Avicii by Avicii) (2014)

Singles from True
- 1. "Wake Me Up" Released: 17 June 2013; 2. "You Make Me" Released: 30 August 2013; 3. "Hey Brother" Released: 28 October 2013; 4. "Addicted to You" Released: 27 November 2013; 5. "Lay Me Down" Released: 21 April 2014

True is the debut studio album by Swedish electronic music producer Avicii, released on 13 September 2013 by PRMD Music and Island Records. Avicii said that sonically, the album would move away from his earlier house music sound on previous records by incorporating elements of other genres such as country music. True was preceded by the release of the Aloe Blacc-assisted "Wake Me Up" that featured a rare Marantz Enhanced Digital Stereo audio track and topped several charts around the world, and "You Make Me", which features vocals from Swedish artist Salem Al Fakir.

True debuted at number two on the UK Albums Chart and peaked within the top-ten of at least ten countries; it subsequently re-peaked at number two on the chart in February 2014. On 24 March 2014, Avicii released a remixed version of the album titled True (Avicii by Avicii). A two-disc edition, comprising the standard 10-track edition alongside the remix album featuring a new album cover, was released in June 2014.

== Background and composition ==
Since starting work on a studio album, Avicii stated on multiple occasions that the material on the album will not be a replication of his earlier hits like "Levels" and "Silhouettes" but rather an experimental and more synthetic record. In his own words, he wanted to bring "disruption" to the electronic dance music scene, which he described as "half stuck". Speaking to music magazine Billboard about the new album, Avicii said in response to an earlier conflict at the Ultra Music Festival that he wanted to "bring 15 minutes of something fresh to break [Ultra] up." In context to the listener's reactions to the heavy bluegrass and country music influences, he additionally stated, "We knew people would be provoked". He further explained that True "is about me being true to my sound but also to my own influences and musical preferences. For me it will be successful if it resonates with people – no matter how many. It's what I stand for, so whoever loves it loves what I love. That's what fans are to me." In 2022, Avicii's biography was released four years after his death. Amongst the anecdotes in the work was revealed that Avicii had wanted to collaborate with American icons such as: Paul Simon, Mick Jagger ("who said no"), Van Morrison ("who's representatives were vague in their answer"), while a representative from Interscope Records was unable to get in touch with Slash, Stevie Wonder or Sting regarding potential collaborations. According to Billboard, there was little interest from the musicians: "For these contented men, whose career peaks were at least twenty years behind them, Avicii was at best an obscure Swede with a summer hit."

== Promotion ==
In April 2013, Avicii released a 60-minute promotional mix of new album material on the online audio distribution platform SoundCloud. The mix featured several unreleased tracks from the album like "Wake Me Up" and songs featuring Dan Reynolds and Mac Davis, and has been played over three million times. According to Billboard, the album was due for release on 17 September 2013.

=== Ultra Music Festival ===
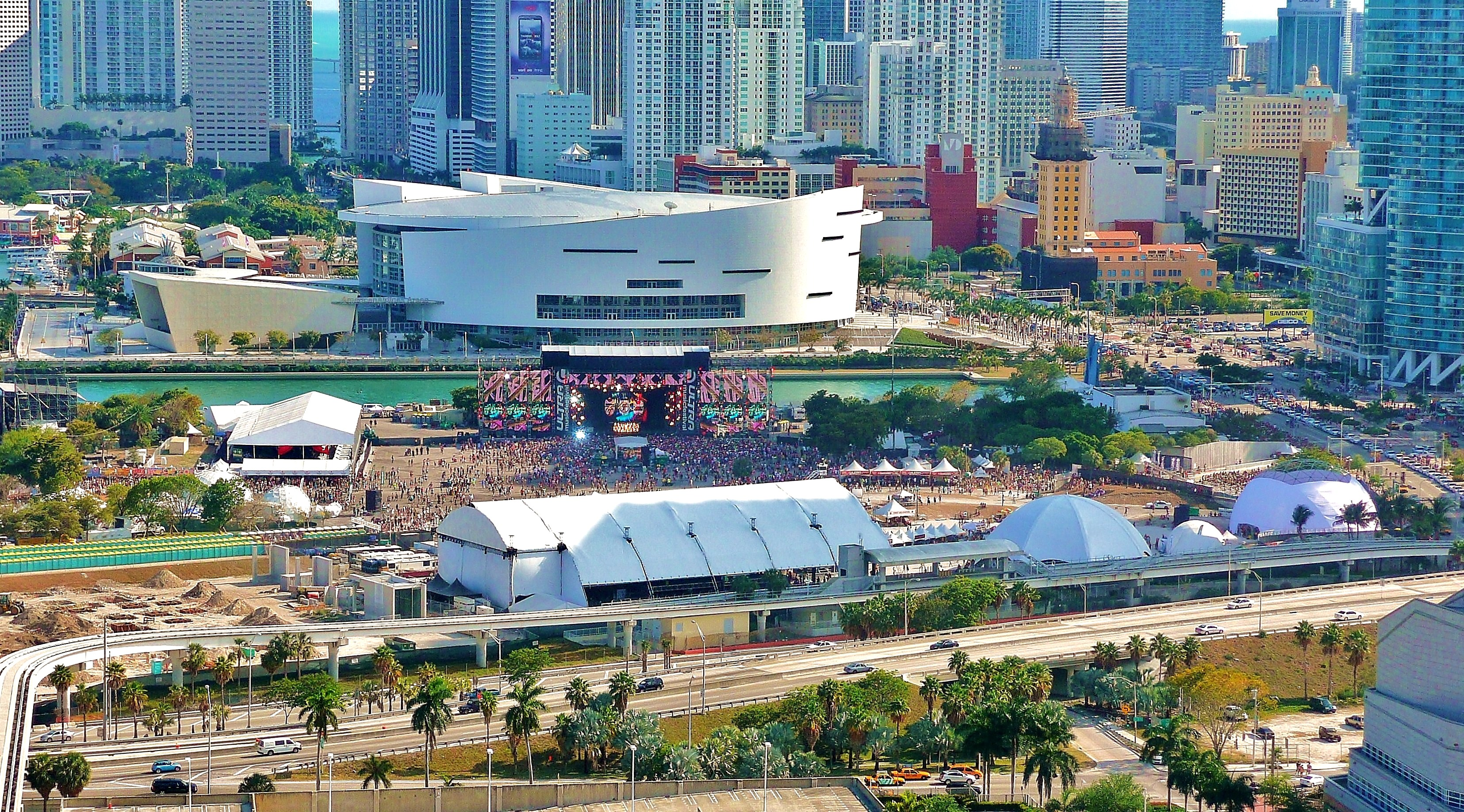
The Ultra Music Festival in Miami's Bicentennial Park, where Avicii showcased material from True.

Avicii performed at the 2013 Ultra Music Festival on 22 March 2013, revealing nearly forty minutes of new album material from True, to which he received a mixed to negative response from critics, fans and media alike. The new material, which incorporated bluegrass and country music elements, and included live performances from Aloe Blacc, backed by a banjo and kazoo, saw a negative response at the festival, whose attendees criticized the DJ for bringing the experimental material to a high-profile electronic dance music festival. Some fans and following musicians also took to social media sites like Twitter to bash the performance. Dubstep/electro house musician Jake Stanczak, better known as Kill the Noise, tweeted: "What are the similarities and differences between Avicii and Al Walser? Discuss." Producer Tommie Sunshine tweeted: "I just listened to @Avicii's @ultramusic Festival Main Stage set; did he jump the #EDM shark?"

However, fans and high-profile musicians were quick to support Avicii and praise his performance at the Ultra Music Festival. Russian producer Zedd said in response to a negative comment about the performance, "I only heard a couple of those country-sounding tracks and I really liked them!" Avicii's manager Ash Pournouri stated on Twitter: "So proud of @Avicii set at @ultramusic. Everyone will understand in a week. Stay calm and keep hyping the album."

On 26 March, Avicii went on Facebook to respond to the negative reaction to the Ultra Music Festival performance. He stated in an extended response, "we wanted to make a statement, and theres really no better place to make one than UMF mainstage. People will soon see what it's all about. [...] My music is open to anyone who wants to listen to it and I will always stay true to my sound. Love you all who listen with open hearts and open minds."

=== True Reveal ===
On 13 August 2013, Avicii premiered his #TrueReveal project. Avicii's management set up an experiment, featuring a glass cube, of which was surrounded by large speakers, and in the cube contained the album artwork for True. Twitter users could tweet a true meaning about themselves using the hash-tag #TrueReveal, and the more users who did this, the more volume of Avicii's second single from the album was directed at the glass cube, until it would break, releasing the album artwork. The experiment ended on 14 August 2013, at 3:29 pm EST. The experiment achieved over 100,000 tweets at 3:13, but the glass still did not break. A crane was called in and a worker threw the hook of the crane into the glass, breaking it, and revealing the album cover.

Later on, the second part of True Reveal was announced. "Track Ambassador" is a project that aims to make 15-second teasers on Instagram to each song on the album. The most voted teasers will be selected as the official ones and the creators will be involved in the making of the official full music video. The winners were revealed on 17 September 2013.

== True (Avicii by Avicii) ==
True: Avicii By Avicii

Remix album by Avicii
- Released: March 23, 2014
- Genres: Progressive house; Electro house; EDM
- Length: 50:33
- Labels: PRMD; Universal
- Producers: Tim Bergling; Ash Pournouri

Avicii chronology
True (2013)	True: Avicii By Avicii (2014)	The Days / Nights EP (2014)

Singles from True: Avicii By Avicii
- 1. "Wake Me Up (Avicii By Avicii)" Released: 25 March 2014; 2. "Hey Brother (Avicii By Avicii)" Released: 9 April 2014; 3. "You Make Me (Avicii By Avicii)" Released: 14 April 2014

True: Avicii By Avicii is the remixed version of Avicii's 2013 album True. The album features most of the tracks from True, but all remixed by Avicii himself, hence the title "Avicii By Avicii". It was released on March 23, 2014.

=== Background ===
On 17 February 2014, manager Ash Pournouri, confirmed through his Facebook, Twitter and Instagram pages that Avicii was due to release a remix edition of True, containing a remake of all the tracks in True remixed by Avicii himself, However, "Heart Upon My Sleeve", "Canyons", "Edom", "Long Road to Hell", "All You Need Is Love", nor "Always on the Run" were not remixed. On 20 February, it was confirmed that the remix edition was due to be released on 24 March 2014.

== Singles ==
"Wake Me Up" was released as the lead single from True on 17 June 2013. The song was first premiered on Pete Tong's show on BBC Radio 1 on 14 June 2013. The song, which features vocals from Aloe Blacc, has so far charted on 20 national singles charts, peaking at number one in ten countries, including the Australian ARIA Charts and the Swedish Sverigetopplistan charts. The song has also peaked at number four on the Billboard Hot 100. The song features a Marantz enhanced digital audio track.

"You Make Me", featuring vocals from Swedish soul/pop singer Salem Al Fakir was revealed as the album's second single on 16 August 2013, when it received its worldwide radio premiere on Pete Tong's BBC Radio 1 dance music show. The single was released in Australia and New Zealand on 30 August 2013 and was scheduled in the United Kingdom for 15 September 2013, a day before the album's release in that region. The song, so far, has charted within the top 40 in several countries including the Netherlands, Germany, Australia and Ireland. Notably, the single has peaked at number one in Avicii's home country of Sweden, the top five in the United Kingdom, and at number 44 on the Canadian Hot 100.

"Hey Brother" was serviced to radio on 9 October 2013 as the album's third single in Australia, and on 1 October 2013 in Denmark. On 28 October 2013, it was released as the album's third single in Germany, Switzerland and Austria. It was released to US Triple A radio on 18 November 2013.

"Addicted to You" impacted Australian radio on 27 November 2013 as the album's fourth single. "Addicted to You" had a lyric video release on Avicii's VEVO page on 24 January 2014.

"Lay Me Down" was released as the fifth single from True; it was released to Australian radio on 21 April 2014.

== Critical reception ==
Professional ratings
Aggregate scores
Source	Rating
Metacritic	69/100
Review scores
Source	Rating
AllMusic	4/5 stars
Entertainment Weekly	B
IZM	4/5 stars
PopMatters	8/10
Rolling Stone	3.5/5 stars
Slant Magazine	0.5/5 stars
Spin	8/10
Sputnikmusic	2/5

True received generally positive reviews. At Metacritic, which assigns a rating out of 100 to reviews from mainstream critics, the album received an average score of 69, based on seven reviews, which indicates "generally favorable reviews".

Philip Sherburne from Spin magazine gave the album a positive review. In his review of True, Sherburne said "Avicii inhabits his newfound country-pop shtick so naturally that you may wonder whether he somehow internalized Ralph Lauren's aesthetic, or whether 'going country' was part of the business plan all along... It may be a sprawling hodge-podge, but all this works more often than you'd expect." Rolling Stone's Caryn Ganz also gave the album a positive review, complementing the diversity of the guest musicians. In her review, Ganz said "Dan Tyminski of Union Station sings the grand Appalachian stomper "Hey Brother," and Imagine Dragons penned "Heart Upon My Sleeve." True saves room for two funky disco jams featuring banging diva vocals from Audra Mae and Adam Lambert. All of this proves that Avicii's new sound is much more than a page from Moby's Play book. PopMatters's Francesca D'Arcy-Orga agreed, saying that "Avicii takes his listeners on a journey with True... it is an album that takes one type of music and moulds it into something completely different, allowing Avicii to cement himself as one of the best DJs in the world. Nick Catucci of Entertainment Weekly also gave the album a positive review, saying, "The challenge he faces, and mostly meets, on his official debut, True, is how to break up a woozy, whomping live experience into songs with feeling — to translate house music for the home."

However, David Jeffires of AllMusic gave the album a mixed-positive review, saying "Country music and bluegrass keep winding their way into the album, and while it rarely smacks of a gimmick, these rustic numbers often evolve into EDM around their drum machine-introducing choruses [...] In the end, it's an admirable and interesting effort where the highs offset the lows, but those with molly in hand and dancing shoes on feet should just cool their jets and get ready to sit a spell." Blue Sullivan's review for Slant Magazine only awarded the album 0.5 out of five stars, saying that "Fans will likely write this off as churlish hatred of pop EDM, but there are other artists that are more than capable of arousing genuine dance-floor thrills [...] Moreover, these artists' best material convincingly conveys something Avicii's work rarely does: a bone-deep love of this music and a palpable desire to create art their beloved EDM ancestors would be proud of."

True ranked 7th on the list The 40 Greatest Dance Albums of the Decade: Staff List by Billboard in 2019. It was ranked at number 45 on Rolling Stone's list of the 50 best albums of 2013.

== Track listing ==
All songs produced by Tim Bergling and co-produced by Arash Pournouri, except where noted.

True – CD / audio cassette / digital download
No.	Title	Writer(s)	Producer(s)	Length
1.	"Wake Me Up"	Tim Bergling; Aloe Blacc; Mike Einziger		4:09
2.	"You Make Me"	Bergling; Pournouri; Vincent Pontare; Salem Al Fakir		3:53
3.	"Hey Brother"	Bergling; Pournouri; Pontare; Fakir; Veronica Maggio		4:14
4.	"Addicted to You"	Bergling; Pournouri; Mac Davis; Josh Krajcik		2:28
5.	"Dear Boy"	Bergling; Pournouri; Karen Marie Ørsted; Jonas Knutsson		7:59
6.	"Liar Liar"	Bergling; Pournouri; Blacc; Einziger; Bruce Driscoll; Erica Driscoll; Peter Dyer		3:58
7.	"Shame on Me"	Bergling; Pournouri; Audra Mae; Sterling Fox		4:13
8.	"Lay Me Down"	Bergling; Pournouri; Nile Rodgers; Adam Lambert	Bergling; Rodgers^{[a]}; Pournouri^{[a]}	5:00
9.	"Hope There's Someone"	Anohni Hegarty		6:21
10.	"Heart Upon My Sleeve"	Bergling; Pournouri		4:40
Total length:				46:55

True – (Bonus Edition)
No.	Title	Writer(s)	Length
11.	"Long Road to Hell"	Bergling; Pournouri; Audra Mae; Alex Seaver	3:42
12.	"Always On The Run"	Bergling; Pournouri; Jonnali Mikaela Parmenius; Mans Vredenberg; Linus Wiklund	4:55
13.	"All You Need Is Love"	Bergling; Pournouri; Ruth-Anne	6:21
14.	"Canyons"	Bergling; Pournouri	7:29
15.	"EDOM"	Bergling; Pournouri	8:15
Total length:			1:17:00

Notes

- ^{^[a]} signifies co-producer

=== Remix album / CD 2 of two-disc edition ===
True (Avicii by Avicii)
No.	Title	Writer(s)	Length
1.	"Wake Me Up" (Avicii by Avicii)	Bergling; Blacc; Einziger	7:05
2.	"You Make Me" (Avicii by Avicii)	Bergling; Pournouri; Pontare; Fakir	3:02
3.	"Hey Brother" (Avicii by Avicii)	Bergling; Pournouri; Pontare; Fakir	6:09
4.	"Addicted to You" (Avicii by Avicii)	Bergling; Pournouri; Davis; Krajcik	5:32
5.	"Dear Boy" (Avicii by Avicii)	Bergling; Pournouri; Ørsted; Knutsson	5:30
6.	"Liar Liar" (Avicii by Avicii)	Bergling; Pournouri; Blacc; Einziger; B. Driscoll; E. Driscoll; Dyer	5:06
7.	"Shame on Me" (Avicii by Avicii)	Bergling; Pournouri; Audra Mae; Fox	3:56
8.	"Lay Me Down" (Avicii by Avicii)	Bergling; Pournouri; Rodgers; Lambert	6:02
9.	"Hope There's Someone" (Avicii by Avicii)	Hegarty	8:08

== Personnel ==
Vocals

- Adam Lambert (track 8)
- Aloe Blacc (tracks 1 and 6)
- Audra Mae (tracks 4, 7 and 11; "Long Road to Hell")
- Blondfire (track 6)
- Dan Tyminski (track 3)
- Linnea Henriksson (track 9)
- Karen Marie Ørsted (track 5)
- Noonie Bao (track 11 (Amazon Europe) /12 (Japanese Edition); "Always on the Run")
- Ruth-Anne (track 11 (Japanese Edition) /12 (Spotify); "All You Need Is Love")
- Salem Al Fakir (track 2 and 3; "Hey Brother (Avicii by Avicii)")
- Sterling Fox (track 7)

Instruments

- Mac Davis – guitar (tracks 4)
- Peter Dyer – keyboards (tracks 1, 6, 7), talkbox (7)
- Mike Einziger – guitar (tracks 1, 6)
- Nile Rodgers – guitar (tracks 8)

Production

- Tim Bergling – producer, mixer
- Stuart Hawkes – mastering
- Arash Pournouri – co-producer

== Charts ==
=== Weekly charts ===
==== True ====
Weekly chart performance for True
Chart (2013–2014)	Peak position
Australian Albums (ARIA)	1
Austrian Albums (Ö3 Austria)	3
Belgian Albums (Ultratop Flanders)	5
Belgian Albums (Ultratop Wallonia)	9
Canadian Albums (Billboard)	2
Chinese Albums (Sino Chart)	15
Danish Albums (Hitlisten)	1
Dutch Albums (Album Top 100)	4
Finnish Albums (Suomen virallinen lista)	6
French Albums (SNEP)	8
German Albums (Offizielle Top 100)	5
Hungarian Albums (MAHASZ)	14
Irish Albums (IRMA)	4
Italian Albums (FIMI)	4
Japanese Albums (Oricon)	13
New Zealand Albums (RMNZ)	5
Norwegian Albums (VG-lista)	1
Polish Albums (ZPAV)	46
Portuguese Albums (AFP)	10
Spanish Albums (Promusicae)	12
Swedish Albums (Sverigetopplistan)	1
Swiss Albums (Schweizer Hitparade)	2
UK Albums (Official Charts)	2
US Billboard 200	5
US Top Dance Albums (Billboard)	1

2018 weekly chart performance for True
Chart (2018)	Peak position
Finnish Albums (Suomen virallinen lista)	2
Czech Albums (ČNS IFPI)	22

==== True (Avicii by Avicii) ====
Weekly chart performance for True (Avicii by Avicii)
Chart (2014)	Peak position
Australian Albums (ARIA)	16
Canadian Albums (Billboard)	21
New Zealand Albums (RMNZ)	23
Norwegian Albums (VG-lista)	26
Swedish Albums (Sverigetopplistan)	12
Swiss Albums (Schweizer Hitparade)	15
US Billboard 200	139
US Top Dance Albums (Billboard)	8

2018 weekly chart performance for True (Avicii by Avicii)
Chart (2018)	Peak position
Czech Albums (ČNS IFPI)	21

2019 weekly chart performance for True (Avicii by Avicii)
Chart (2019)	Peak position
Swedish Albums (Sverigetopplistan)	7

=== Year-end charts ===
==== True ====
Year-end chart performance for True
Chart (2013)	Position
Australian Albums (ARIA)	28
Austrian Albums (Ö3 Austria)	45
Belgian Albums (Ultratop Flanders)	93
Belgian Albums (Ultratop Wallonia)	157
Dutch Albums (Album Top 100)	55
French Albums (SNEP)	90
German Albums (Offizielle Top 100)	56
Hungarian Albums (MAHASZ)	94
Swedish Albums (Sverigetopplistan)	2
Swiss Albums (Schweizer Hitparade)	37
UK Albums (OCC)	58
US Top Dance/Electronic Albums (Billboard)	6
Chart (2014)	Position
Austrian Albums (Ö3 Austria)	49
Canadian Albums (Billboard)	49
Dutch Albums (Album Top 100)	33
Finnish Albums (Suomen virallinen lista)	2
French Albums (SNEP)	69
Swedish Albums (Sverigetopplistan)	1
Swiss Albums (Schweizer Hitparade)	37
UK Albums (OCC)	31
US Billboard 200	113
US Top Dance/Electronic Albums (Billboard)	3
Chart (2015)	Position
Swedish Albums (Sverigetopplistan)	17
Chart (2016)	Position
Swedish Albums (Sverigetopplistan)	63
Chart (2017)	Position
Swedish Albums (Sverigetopplistan)	70
Chart (2018)	Position
Danish Albums (Hitlisten)	74
Swedish Albums (Sverigetopplistan)	14
US Top Dance/Electronic Albums (Billboard)	16
Chart (2019)	Position
Belgian Albums (Ultratop Flanders)	188
US Top Dance/Electronic Albums (Billboard)	14
Chart (2020)	Position
US Top Dance/Electronic Albums (Billboard)	16
Chart (2021)	Position
US Top Dance/Electronic Albums (Billboard)	14
Chart (2022)	Position
US Top Dance/Electronic Albums (Billboard)	14
Chart (2023)	Position
Belgian Albums (Ultratop Flanders)	197
Dutch Albums (Album Top 100)	82
Swedish Albums (Sverigetopplistan)	41
US Top Dance/Electronic Albums (Billboard)	13
Chart (2024)	Position
Australian Dance Albums (ARIA)	25
Belgian Albums (Ultratop Flanders)	180
Swedish Albums (Sverigetopplistan)	45
US Top Dance/Electronic Albums (Billboard)	18
Chart (2025)	Position
Swedish Albums (Sverigetopplistan)	26

==== True (Avicii by Avicii) ====
Year-end chart performance for True (Avicii by Avicii)
Chart (2018)	Position
Swedish Albums (Sverigetopplistan)	39
Chart (2019)	Position
Swedish Albums (Sverigetopplistan)	25
Chart (2020)	Position
Swedish Albums (Sverigetopplistan)	30
Chart (2021)	Position
Swedish Albums (Sverigetopplistan)	26
Chart (2022)	Position
Swedish Albums (Sverigetopplistan)	46

== Certifications ==
Certifications for True
Region	Certification	Certified units/sales
Australia (ARIA)	2× Platinum	140,000^{‡}
Austria (IFPI Austria)	3× Platinum	45,000^{*}
Brazil (Pro-Música Brasil)	Platinum	40,000^{*}
Canada (Music Canada)	Platinum	80,000^{^}
Colombia (ASINCOL)	Gold	
Denmark (IFPI Danmark)	3× Platinum	60,000^{‡}
Finland (Musiikkituottajat)	Gold	10,007
France (SNEP)	Platinum	100,000^{*}
Germany (BVMI)	3× Gold	300,000^{‡}
Hungary (MAHASZ)	Gold	1,000^{^}
Italy (FIMI)	Platinum	50,000^{‡}
Mexico (AMPROFON)	2× Platinum	120,000^{^}
New Zealand (RMNZ)	Platinum	15,000^{‡}
Norway (IFPI Norway)	2× Platinum	60,000^{‡}
Poland (ZPAV)	2× Platinum	40,000^{*}
Portugal (AFP)	Platinum	15,000^{^}
Singapore (RIAS)	Platinum	10,000^{*}
Sweden (GLF)	3× Platinum	120,000^{‡}
Switzerland (IFPI Switzerland)	Gold	10,000^{^}
United Kingdom (BPI)	Platinum	300,000^{*}
United States (RIAA)	Platinum	1,000,000^{‡}
^{*} Sales figures based on certification alone.^{^} Shipments figures based on certification alone.^{‡} Sales+streaming figures based on certification alone.

== Release history ==
Release history for True
Country	Date	Format	Label
France	13 September 2013	Digital download	Island; Virgin EMI
Germany	13 September 2013	CD; digital download	Island; Universal
Sweden	13 September 2013	CD; digital download	Universal
Norway	13 September 2013	CD; digital download	Universal
Spain	13 September 2013	Digital download	Universal
France	16 September 2013	CD	UMG France
United Kingdom	16 September 2013	CD; digital download	Island
United States	17 September 2013	CD; digital download	PRMD; Island
