= List of number-one albums of 2014 (Australia) =

ARIA Charts number-one albums of 2014 < 2013 2015 >

Other Australian number-one charts of 2014
- singles
- urban singles
- dance singles
- club tracks
- digital tracks
- streaming tracks

Top Australian singles and albums of 2014
- Triple J Hottest 100
- top 25 singles
- top 25 albums

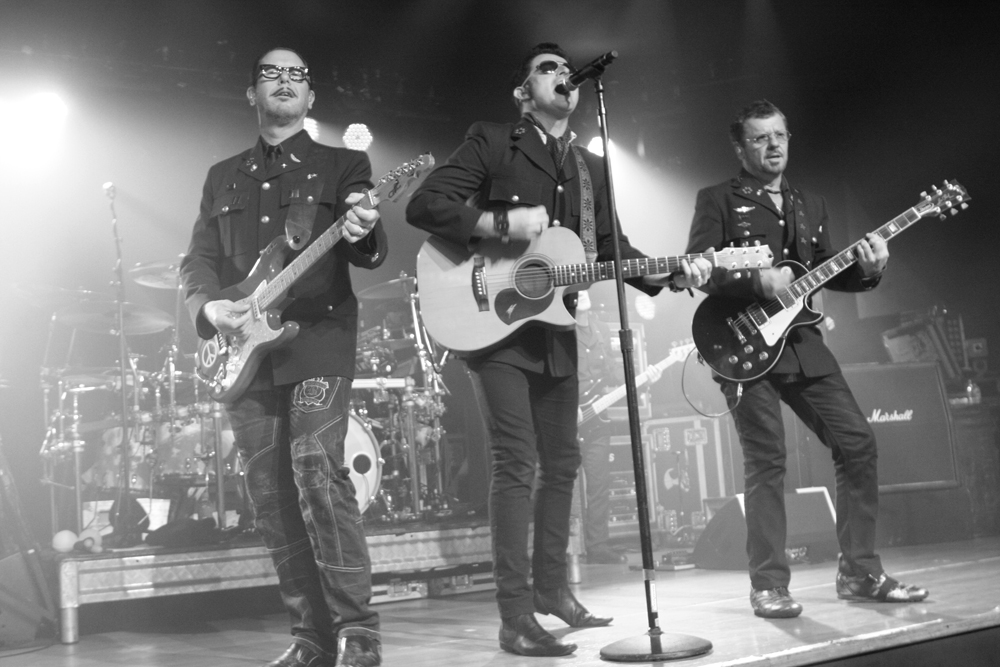
INXS' The Very Best was the longest-running number-one album of 2014, having topped the ARIA Albums Chart for seven weeks.

The ARIA Albums Chart ranks the best-performing albums and extended plays in Australia. Its data, published by the Australian Recording Industry Association, is based collectively on each album and EP's weekly physical and digital sales. In 2014, thirty-one albums claimed the top spot, including Michael Bublé's Christmas, which started its peak position in 2011. Ten acts achieved their first number-one album in Australia: Beyoncé, Avicii, MKTO, Pharrell Williams, Chet Faker, The Black Keys, Sia, Vance Joy, The Madden Brothers and Barbra Streisand.

INXS' The Very Best was the longest-running number-one album of 2014, having topped the ARIA Albums Chart for seven weeks. Ed Sheeran's x was the second longest-running number-one album, with six weeks at the top spot. Taylor Swift's 1989 spent four weeks atop the chart, while Beyoncé's self-titled album and Coldplay's Ghost Stories both topped the chart for three consecutive weeks. Faker's Built on Glass and Hilltop Hoods's Walking Under Stars both spent two consecutive weeks at number one.

== Chart history ==
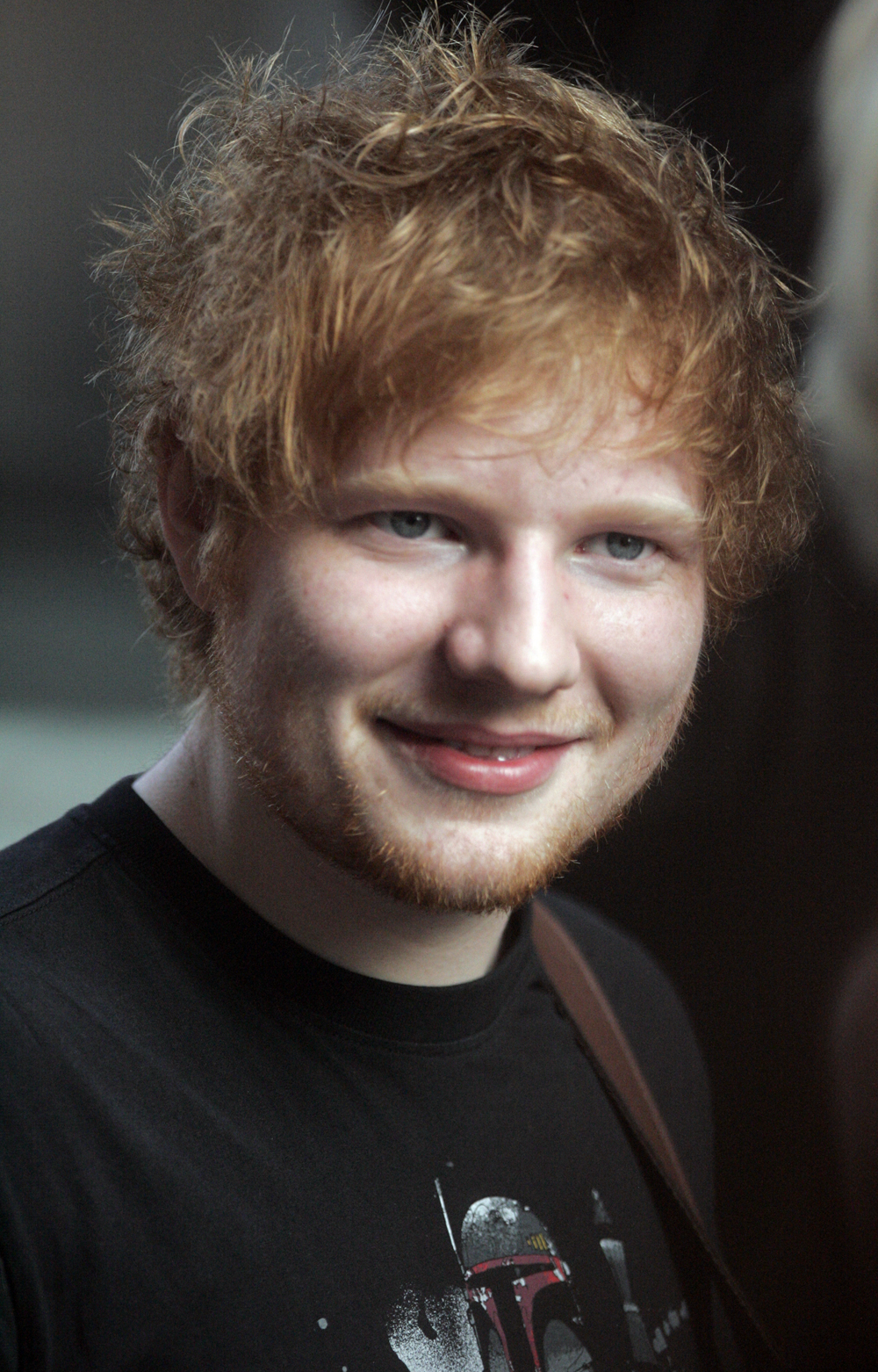
Ed Sheeran's x was the second longest-running number-one album, having topped the ARIA Albums Chart for six weeks.

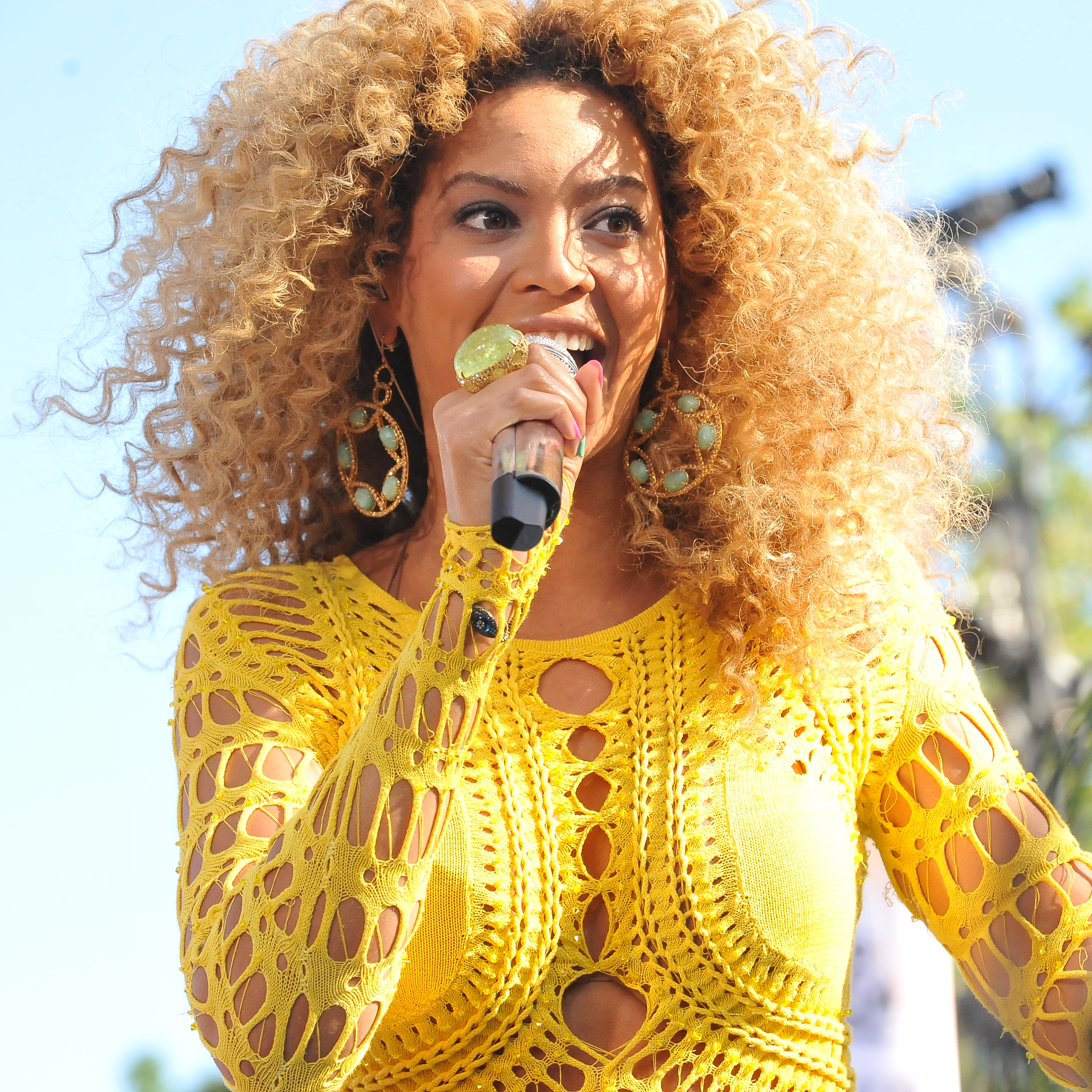
Beyoncé earned her first Australian number-one with her self-titled album, which topped the ARIA Albums Chart for three consecutive weeks.

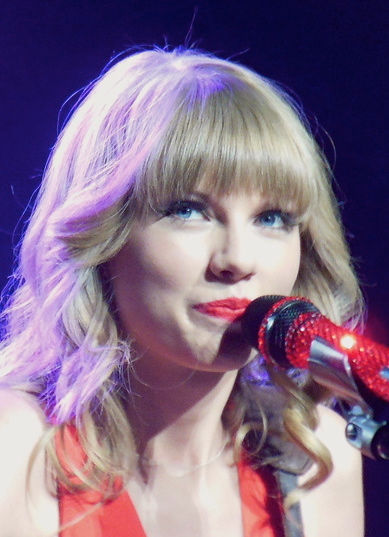
Taylor Swift's 1989 topped the ARIA Albums Chart for four weeks and became her third number-one album in Australia.

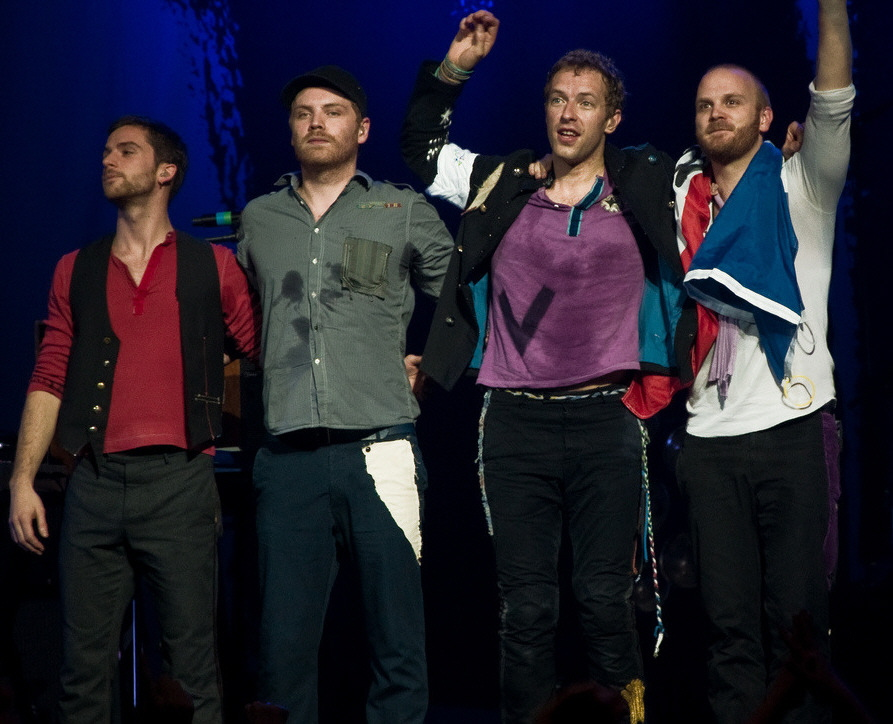
Coldplay's Ghost Stories topped the ARIA Albums Chart for three consecutive weeks and became their fifth number-one album in Australia.

Key
The yellow background indicates the #1 album on ARIA's End of Year Albums Chart of 2014.

Date	Album	Artist(s)	Ref.
6 January	Beyoncé	Beyoncé	
13 January	Beyoncé	Beyoncé	
20 January	Beyoncé	Beyoncé	
27 January	High Hopes	Bruce Springsteen	
3 February	True	Avicii	
10 February	MKTO	MKTO	
17 February	The Very Best	INXS	
24 February	The Very Best	INXS	
3 March	The Very Best	INXS	
10 March	The Very Best	INXS	
17 March	Girl	Pharrell Williams	
24 March	Kiss Me Once	Kylie Minogue	
31 March	The Very Best	INXS	
7 April	The Very Best	INXS	
14 April	The Very Best	INXS	
21 April	Built on Glass	Chet Faker	
28 April	Built on Glass	Chet Faker	
5 May	Frozen	Various artists	
12 May	Frozen	Various artists	
19 May	Turn Blue	The Black Keys	
26 May	Ghost Stories	Coldplay	
2 June	Ghost Stories	Coldplay	
9 June	Ghost Stories	Coldplay	
16 June	Let the Ocean Take Me	The Amity Affliction	
23 June	Ultraviolence	Lana Del Rey	
30 June	x	Ed Sheeran	
7 July	5 Seconds of Summer	5 Seconds of Summer	
14 July	1000 Forms of Fear	Sia	
21 July	Burnt Letters	Taylor Henderson	
28 July	x	Ed Sheeran	
4 August	x	Ed Sheeran	
11 August	Angus & Julia Stone	Angus & Julia Stone	
18 August	Walking Under Stars	Hilltop Hoods	
25 August	Walking Under Stars	Hilltop Hoods	
1 September	My Everything	Ariana Grande	
8 September	30:30 Hindsight	Jimmy Barnes	
15 September	Dream Your Life Away	Vance Joy	
22 September	Greetings from California	The Madden Brothers	
29 September	Partners	Barbra Streisand	
6 October	x	Ed Sheeran	
13 October	x	Ed Sheeran	
20 October	Triple J's Like a Version Volume 10	Various artists	
27 October	.5: The Gray Chapter	Slipknot	
3 November	1989	Taylor Swift	
10 November	1989	Taylor Swift	
17 November	Sonic Highways	Foo Fighters	
24 November	Four	One Direction	
1 December	1989	Taylor Swift	
8 December	Rock or Bust	AC/DC	
15 December	Christmas	Michael Bublé	
22 December	1989	Taylor Swift	
29 December	x	Ed Sheeran	

== Number-one artists ==
Position	Artist	Weeks at No. 1
1	INXS	7
2	Ed Sheeran	6
3	Taylor Swift	4
4	Beyoncé	3
4	Coldplay	3
5	Chet Faker	2
5	Hilltop Hoods	2
6	Bruce Springsteen	1
6	Avicii	1
6	MKTO	1
6	Pharrell Williams	1
6	Kylie Minogue	1
6	The Black Keys	1
6	The Amity Affliction	1
6	Lana Del Rey	1
6	5 Seconds of Summer	1
6	Sia	1
6	Taylor Henderson	1
6	Angus & Julia Stone	1
6	Ariana Grande	1
6	Jimmy Barnes	1
6	Vance Joy	1
6	The Madden Brothers	1
6	Barbra Streisand	1
6	Slipknot	1
6	Foo Fighters	1
6	One Direction	1
6	AC/DC	1
6	Michael Bublé	1

== See also ==
- 2014 in music
- List of number-one singles of 2014 (Australia)
- List of Top 25 albums for 2014 in Australia
