= Josh Krajcik =

American singer-songwriter

- Born: Wooster, Ohio, United States
- Genres: Blues, rock, soul
- Occupations: Singer-songwriter, musician
- Instruments: Vocals, guitar, piano
- Years active: 1995–present
- Labels: Phonogenic, Sony
- Website: joshkrajcik.com

Joshua Andrew Krajcik (/ˈkrædʒɪk/ KRAJ-ik) is an American singer-songwriter. He began his career as a solo artist and later went on to form the Josh Krajcik Band with Corey Gillen and Mitch Pinkston. He was the runner-up in the first season of The X Factor USA in 2011.

== Personal life ==
Josh Krajcik was born in Wooster, Ohio to Lisa and Ron Krajcik. Krajcik has an older brother named Zack. He began taking piano lessons at an early age and has indicated that he had one piano teacher that taught him basic music theory as well as how to read music, while another piano teacher taught him how to play by ear. Krajcik was in junior high when he began playing guitar. He received his first guitar, a Fender Stratocaster, from his dad, Ron, when he was 12 years old. His father also plays guitar and the two have been known to often jam together. Krajcik attended Triway High School, where he graduated from in 1999.

== Music career ==
=== Early years ===
Krajcik began performing in front of live audiences at the age of 15, admitted to lying about his age in order to get early gigs at bars around Wayne County, Ohio. His first gig was at the Shady Glen, a bar in Lodi, Ohio. Krajcik convinced the owners he was 22 and received $100 for the gig. After high school, Krajcik fronted a number of bands and projects while living in the Wooster, Ohio, area. Unreleased tracks are in limited circulation from Josh's time with "Etherface " and Love Lies Bleeding.

=== X-Factor ===
Josh auditioned for the first season in Chicago, Illinois of Simon Cowell's The X Factor USA in front of Cowell, Paula Abdul, Cheryl Cole and L.A. Reid. Josh performed "At Last" at his audition. The video of his audition has been viewed over 15 million times on YouTube. He went on to become one of the Top 32 and performed in the Judges Houses round "The First Time Ever I Saw Your Face" in front of special guest Enrique Iglesias and mentor Nicole Scherzinger, who replaced Cole. From there, he moved on to become one of the finalists (Final 16), qualifying for the live shows in the Over-30s category mentored by Scherzinger. Krajcik finished in 2nd place behind Melanie Amaro.

==== X-Factor Performances ====
Performance	Theme	Song choice	Original artist	Order	Result
Audition	Auditioner's choice	"At Last"	Glenn Miller and his orchestra, with vocals by Ray Eberle and Pat Friday	—N/a	Through to bootcamp
Bootcamp 1	Judge's choice	"Superman (It's Not Easy)" (with Tiger Budbill, Nick Dean, Kompl3te, Andrew Muccitelli, James Kenny and Thomas McAbee)	Five for Fighting	—N/a	Advanced
Bootcamp 2	Auditioner's choice	"Up to the Mountain"	Patty Griffin	—N/a	Through to judges' houses
Judges' houses	Solo	"The First Time Ever I Saw Your Face"	Ewan MacColl	—N/a	Through to live shows
Top 17	—N/a	"Forever Young"	Bob Dylan	12	Saved by Nicole Scherzinger
Top 12	—N/a	"Jar of Hearts"	Christina Perri	6	Safe (3rd)
Top 11	Songs from movies	"With a Little Help from My Friends"	The Beatles	9	Safe (6th)
Top 10	Rock	"The Pretender"	Foo Fighters	6	Safe (3rd)
Top 9	Giving thanks	"Wild Horses"	The Rolling Stones	9	Safe (1st)
Top 7	Michael Jackson	"Dirty Diana"	Michael Jackson	1	Safe (4th)
Top 5	Dance hits	"We Found Love"	Rihanna	4	Safe (3rd)
Top 5	"Save-me" songs	"Something"	The Beatles	4	Safe (3rd)
Top 4	Pepsi Challenge	"Come Together"	The Beatles	4	Safe (3rd)
Top 4	"Get me to the final" songs (no specific theme)	"Hallelujah"	Leonard Cohen	4	Safe (3rd)
Top 3	Celebrity duets	"Uninvited"	Alanis Morissette	1	Runner-up (2nd)
Top 3	Audition songs	"At Last"	Glenn Miller and his orchestra, with vocals by Ray Eberle and Pat Friday	4	Runner-up (2nd)
Finale	Christmas Songs	"Please Come Home for Christmas"	Charles Brown	3	Runner-up (2nd)

=== After the X-Factor ===
After finishing The X Factor, Josh began working on his album and touring regionally in the Midwest. Recording for the album took place between Los Angeles and London. Throughout the recording process Josh worked with producers Eg White, Steve Robson, Steve Kipner, Andrew Frampton, and more. He continued to play sold-out shows throughout the Midwest while the album was mixed and mastered. On November 29, 2012, Krajcik performed as a guest artist on The X Factor. He performed his song "One Thing She'll Never Know" and released a 4-song EP on iTunes, titled Josh Krajcik EP, that same night. In recent interviews Josh has stated that he will continue to tour and release a full-length album in Spring 2013. On February 8, Krajcik confirmed the release of his first album Blindly, Lonely, Lovely; it was released April 2, 2013.

Josh released his first solo independent album - Oblivion - on May 18, 2017. Co-written and co-produced with Bill Patterson (The Wet Darlings) the six song EP "traded in horn sections and other big-budget production flourishes (of Blindly, Lonely, Lovely) for an up-close, personal sound".

In December 2018 Krajcik released a cover of the Etta James song that won him a spot on The X Factor - At Last.

He also performed Dream On by Aerosmith at a Harmony Project concert at the Columbus Commons on May 14, 2026.

=== Josh Krajcik Band ===
After years of performing solo and in bands, Josh was introduced to bass player Mitch Pinkston in Bowling Green, Ohio. Once Mitch graduated from Bowling Green State University, he moved to Columbus. Josh would visit and play acoustic shows with Mitch. In 2005, Josh booked a full band show at a venue called The Blues Station (now The Garage Bar) without having a drummer for the band. Josh asked the sound engineer at the club, Eric French, if he knew anybody that could sit in and play drums for the show. Eric introduced Josh to local drummer Corey Gillen, and the three would continue performing together as Josh Krajcik Band through 2011, with rhythm guitar player, Eric French, added to the band in early 2011.

After the formation of Josh Krajcik Band, Josh promptly recorded the band's first record "Ghosts" (2005) with Joe Viers at Schwab Studios in Columbus, Ohio. Shortly after, the band went on tour to support Hollywood Records artist, and fellow Ohio native, Gran Bel Fisher. On tour they opened for such prestigious artists as: Corinne Bailey Rae, Brandi Carlile, and The Fray. After performing at Bonnaroo in 2006, they appeared on ABC's Jimmy Kimmel Live! and NPR's renowned World Cafe in 2007.

Upon their return to Ohio, Josh Krajcik Band continued building its fan-base in the mid-west by playing live shows in Columbus (Comfest), Wooster (Javapalooza, WoosterFest), Cleveland (Brother's Lounge), Cincinnati (Mt Adams Music Festival), Toledo, Newport (Southgate House), and Nashville (The Billy Block Show). They also began working on songs for their second record, "Atavistic." Looking to build upon the feel and mood of "Ghosts," they again worked with co-producer/engineer Joe Viers, this time at Sonic Lounge Studios in Grove City, Ohio. A release party was held for "Atavistic" on February 11, 2011, at Victory's in the Columbus, Ohio, Brewery District.

== Discography ==
- Ghosts (2005)
- Atavistic (2011)
- Josh Krajcik (2012)
- Blindly, Lonely, Lovely (2013)
- Oblivion (2017)
