= List of number-one club tracks of 2014 (Australia) =

ARIA Charts number-one club tracks of 2014 < 2013 2015 >

Other Australian number-one charts of 2014
- albums
- singles
- urban singles
- dance singles
- digital tracks
- streaming tracks

Top Australian singles and albums of 2014
- Triple J Hottest 100
- top 25 singles
- top 25 albums

This is the list of number-one tracks on the ARIA Club Chart in 2014, and is compiled by the Australian Recording Industry Association (ARIA) from weekly DJ reports.

== 2014 ==
Date		Song	Artist(s)	Reference
January	13	"Eat, Sleep, Rave, Repeat"	Fatboy Slim and Riva Starr featuring Beardyman	
January	20	"Eat, Sleep, Rave, Repeat"	Fatboy Slim and Riva Starr featuring Beardyman	
January	27	"Eat, Sleep, Rave, Repeat"	Fatboy Slim and Riva Starr featuring Beardyman	
February	3	"Eat, Sleep, Rave, Repeat"	Fatboy Slim and Riva Starr featuring Beardyman	
February	10	"Eat, Sleep, Rave, Repeat"	Fatboy Slim and Riva Starr featuring Beardyman	
February	17	"Eat, Sleep, Rave, Repeat"	Fatboy Slim and Riva Starr featuring Beardyman	
February	24	"I Got U"	Duke Dumont featuring Jax Jones	
March	3	"I Got U"	Duke Dumont featuring Jax Jones	
March	10	"I Got U"	Duke Dumont featuring Jax Jones	
March	17	"I Got U"	Duke Dumont featuring Jax Jones	
March	24	"Don't Call Me Baby (Tommie Sunshine & Disco Fries Mix)"	Madison Avenue	
March	31	"Don't Call Me Baby (Tommie Sunshine & Disco Fries Mix)"	Madison Avenue	
April	7	"Don't Call Me Baby (Tommie Sunshine & Disco Fries Mix)"	Madison Avenue	
April	14	"Don't Call Me Baby (Tommie Sunshine & Disco Fries Mix)"	Madison Avenue	
April	21	"Don't Call Me Baby (Tommie Sunshine & Disco Fries Mix)"	Madison Avenue	
April	28	"High"	Peking Duk	
May	5	"High"	Peking Duk	
May	12	"High"	Peking Duk	
May	19	"High"	Peking Duk	
May	26	"High"	Peking Duk	
June	2	"High"	Peking Duk	
June	9	"High"	Peking Duk	
June	16	"Faded"	Zhu	
June	23	"Faded"	Zhu	
June	30	"Faded"	Zhu	
July	7	"Everybody Together"	Nicky Night Time	
July	14	"Everybody Together"	Nicky Night Time	
July	21	"Everybody Together"	Nicky Night Time	
July	28	"Everybody Together"	Nicky Night Time	
August	4	"Everybody Together"	Nicky Night Time	
August	11	"Blur"	Ember	
August	18	"Blur"	Ember	
August	25	"Won't Look Back"	Duke Dumont	
September	1	"Firefly"	I Am Sam & Archie featuring Sophia Brown	
September	8	"Firefly"	I Am Sam & Archie featuring Sophia Brown	
September	15	"Firefly"	I Am Sam & Archie featuring Sophia Brown	
September	22	"Show Me All of Your Love"	Kaz James	
September	29	"Show Me All of Your Love"	Kaz James	
October	6	"Show Me All of Your Love"	Kaz James	
October	13	"The Weekend"	Generik	
October	20	"The Weekend"	Generik	
October	27	"The Weekend"	Generik	
November	3	"The Weekend"	Generik	
November	10	"The Weekend"	Generik	
November	17	"Bugatti"	Tiga featuring Pusha T	
November	24	"Bugatti"	Tiga featuring Pusha T	
December	1	"Bugatti"	Tiga featuring Pusha T	
December	8	"Bugatti"	Tiga featuring Pusha T	
December	15	"Bugatti"	Tiga featuring Pusha T	
December	22	"Bugatti"	Tiga featuring Pusha T	

== Number-one artists ==
Position	Artist	Weeks at No. 1
1	Peking Duk	7
2	Fatboy Slim	6
2	Riva Starr	6
2	Beardyman	6
2	Tiga	6
2	Pusha T	6
3	Duke Dumont	5
3	Generik	5
3	Madison Avenue	5
3	Nicky Night Time	5
4	Jax Jones	4
5	I Am Sam & Archie	3
5	Kaz James	3
5	Sophia Brown	3
5	Zhu	3
6	Ember	2

== See also ==
- ARIA Charts
- List of number-one singles of 2014 (Australia)
- List of number-one albums of 2014 (Australia)
- List of number-one dance singles of 2014 (Australia)
- 2014 in music
