= List of number-one singles of 2014 (Australia) =

ARIA Charts number-one singles of 2014 < 2013 2015 >

Other Australian number-one charts of 2014
- albums
- urban singles
- dance singles
- club tracks
- digital tracks
- streaming tracks

Top Australian singles and albums of 2014
- Triple J Hottest 100
- top 25 singles
- top 25 albums

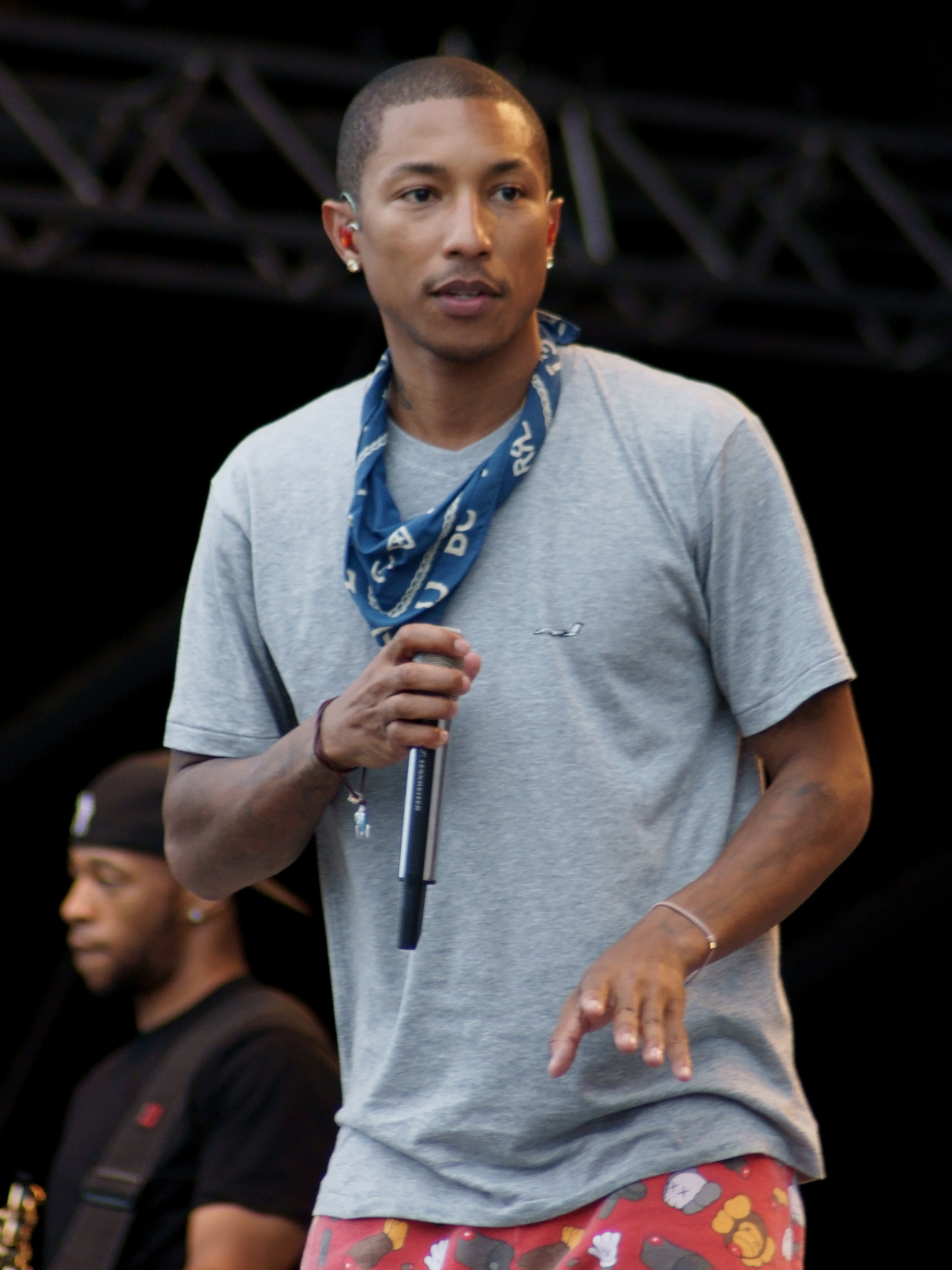
Pharrell Williams' "Happy" was the longest-running number-one single of 2014, having topped the ARIA Singles Chart for twelve weeks.

The ARIA Singles Chart ranks the best-performing singles in Australia. Its data, published by the Australian Recording Industry Association, is based collectively on each single's weekly physical and digital sales. In 2014, fourteen singles claimed the top spot. Eight acts achieved their first number-one single in Australia: A Great Big World, 5 Seconds of Summer, Sheppard, Ed Sheeran, The Madden Brothers, Paloma Faith, Meghan Trainor and Mark Ronson. 5 Seconds of Summer, Sheppard, Justice Crew and The Veronicas were the only Australian artists that achieved a number-one single in 2014.

Sheeran had two number-one singles during the year for "Sing" and "Thinking Out Loud". Taylor Swift also earned two number-one singles during the year for "Shake It Off" and "Blank Space". Pharrell Williams' "Happy" was the longest-running number-one single of 2014, having topped the ARIA Singles Chart for twelve weeks. Justice Crew's "Que Sera" was the second longest-running number-one single, with nine consecutive weeks at the top spot. Sheeran's "Thinking Out Loud" stayed at number one for five consecutive weeks, while Trainor's "All About That Bass" topped the chart for four weeks. Sheppard's "Geronimo", Swift's "Shake It Off" and "Blank Space", The Veronicas' "You Ruin Me" and Ronson's "Uptown Funk" each spent three consecutive weeks at the number one spot.

== Chart history ==
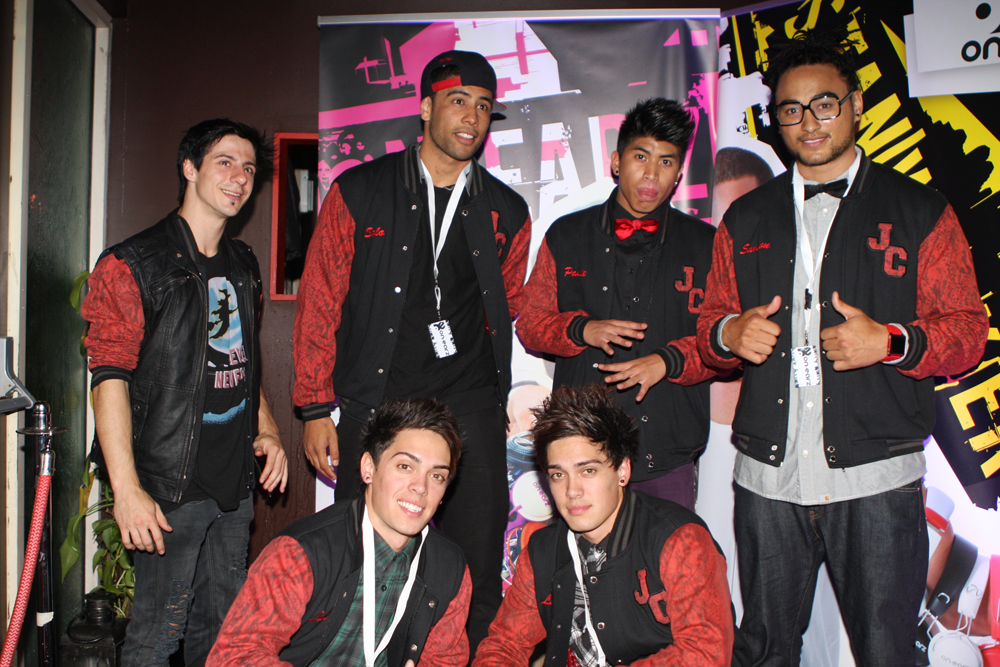
Justice Crew's "Que Sera" was the second longest-running number-one single of 2014, having topped the ARIA Singles Chart for nine consecutive weeks.

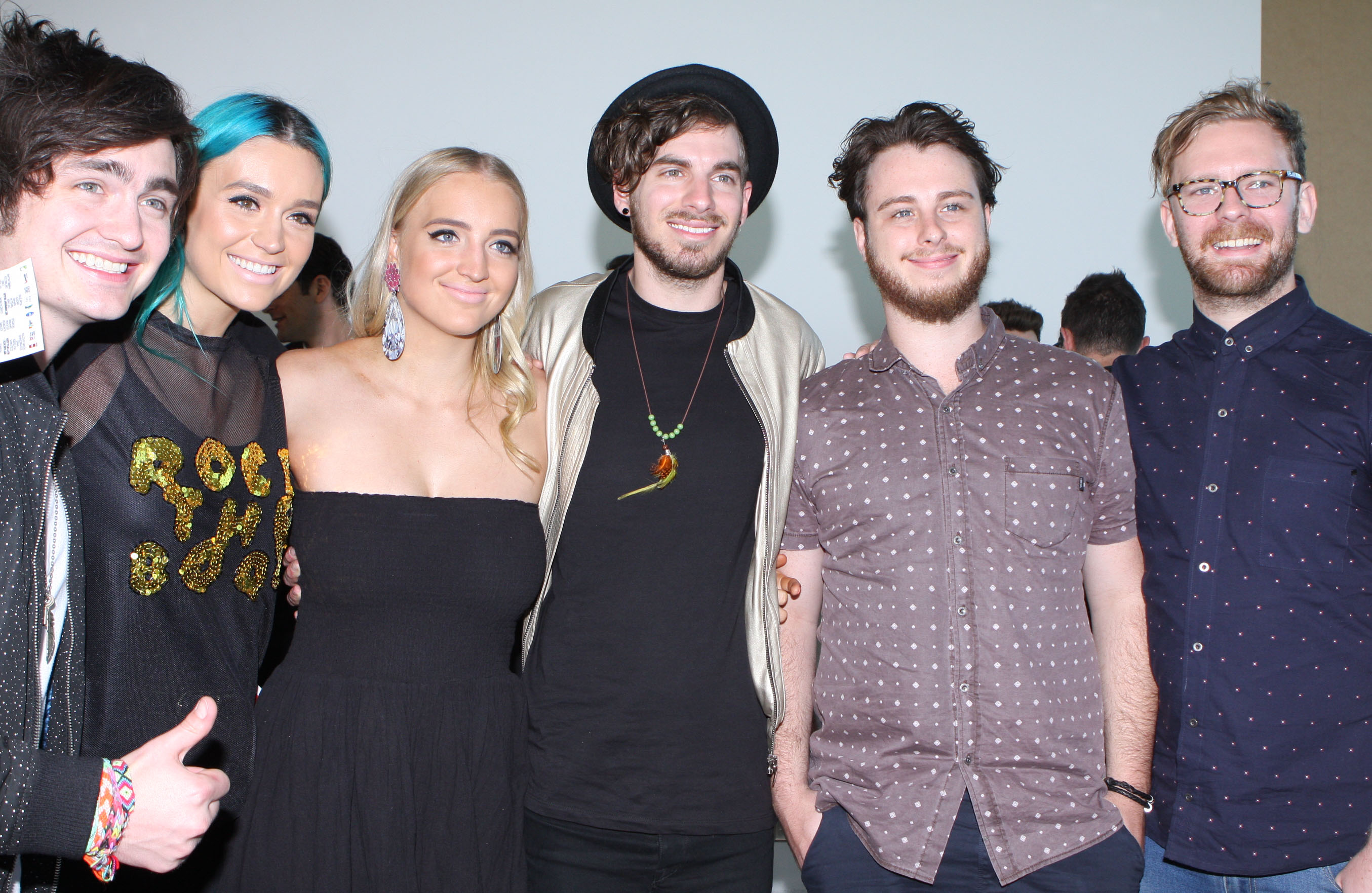
Sheppard earned their first number-one single with "Geronimo", which topped the ARIA Singles Chart for three consecutive weeks.

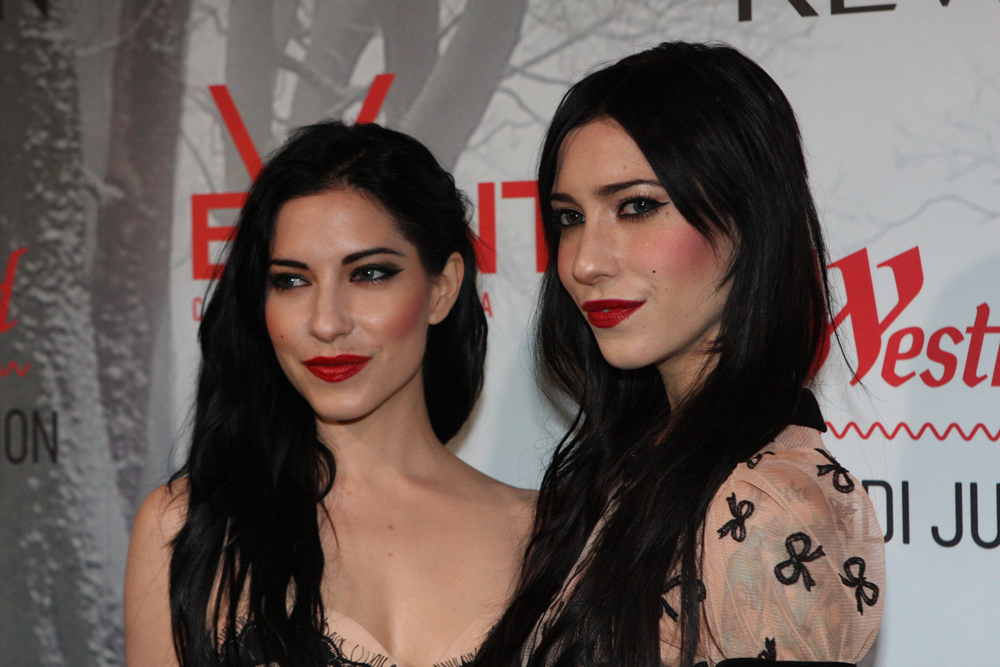
The Veronicas' "You Ruin Me" topped the ARIA Singles Chart for three consecutive weeks and became their second number-one single.

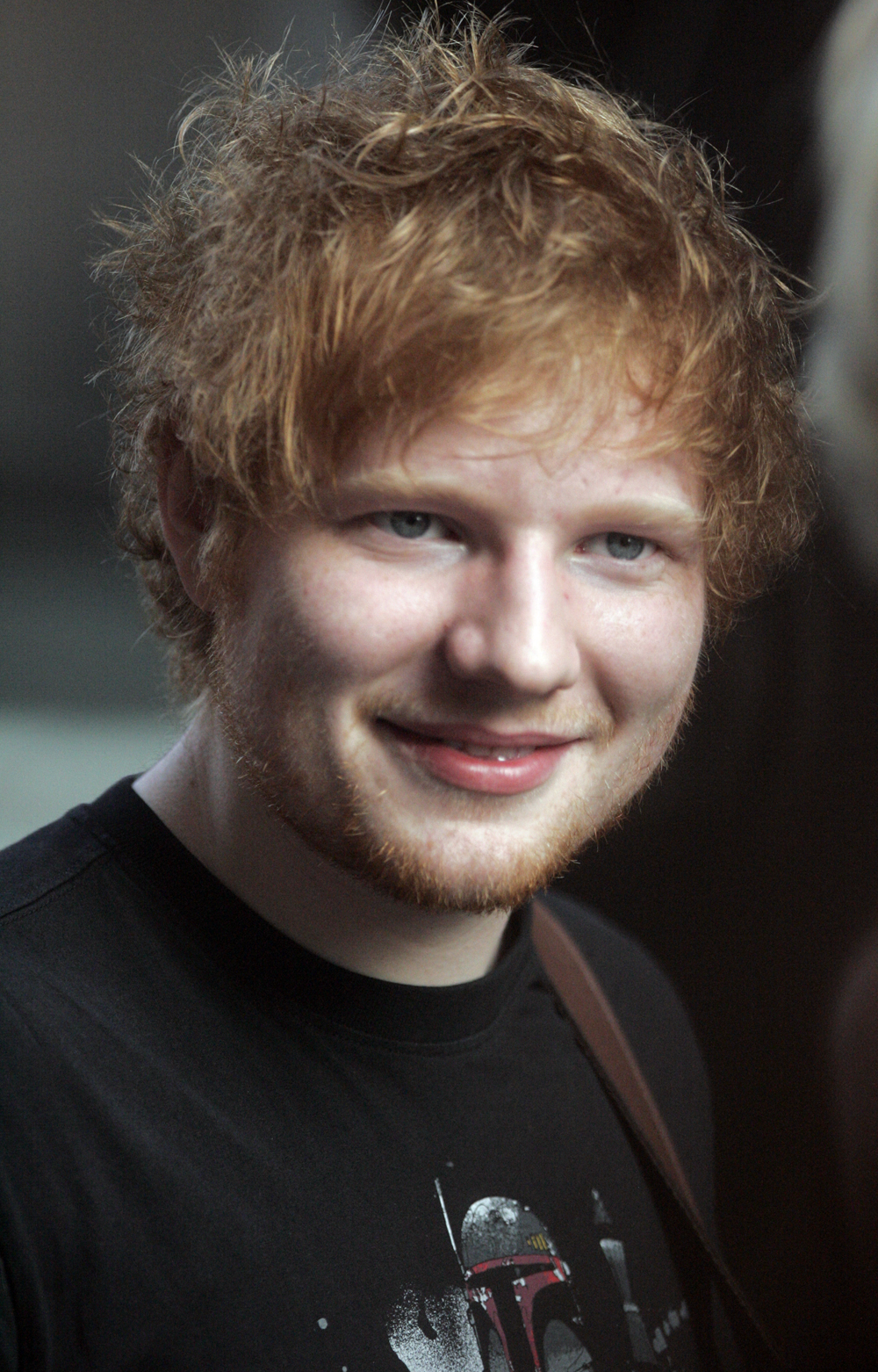
Ed Sheeran achieved two number-one singles during the year for "Sing" and "Thinking Out Loud".

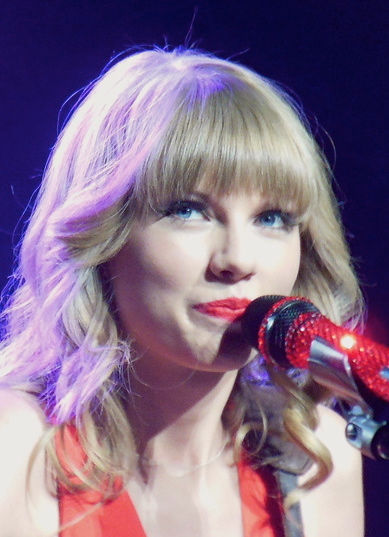
Taylor Swift achieved two number-one singles during the year for "Shake It Off" and "Blank Space".

Key
The yellow background indicates the #1 song on ARIA's End of Year Singles Chart of 2014.

Date	Song	Artist(s)	Ref.
6 January	"Happy"	Pharrell Williams	
13 January	"Happy"	Pharrell Williams	
20 January	"Happy"	Pharrell Williams	
27 January	"Happy"	Pharrell Williams	
3 February	"Happy"	Pharrell Williams	
10 February	"Say Something"	A Great Big World and Christina Aguilera	
17 February	"Happy"	Pharrell Williams	
24 February	"Happy"	Pharrell Williams	
3 March	"Happy"	Pharrell Williams	
10 March	"Happy"	Pharrell Williams	
17 March	"Happy"	Pharrell Williams	
24 March	"Happy"	Pharrell Williams	
31 March	"She Looks So Perfect"	5 Seconds of Summer	
7 April	"Happy"	Pharrell Williams	
14 April	"Geronimo"	Sheppard	
21 April	"Geronimo"	Sheppard	
28 April	"Geronimo"	Sheppard	
5 May	"Sing"	Ed Sheeran	
12 May	"Que Sera"	Justice Crew	
19 May	"Que Sera"	Justice Crew	
26 May	"Que Sera"	Justice Crew	
2 June	"Que Sera"	Justice Crew	
9 June	"Que Sera"	Justice Crew	
16 June	"Que Sera"	Justice Crew	
23 June	"Que Sera"	Justice Crew	
30 June	"Que Sera"	Justice Crew	
7 July	"Que Sera"	Justice Crew	
14 July	"We Are Done"	The Madden Brothers	
21 July	"We Are Done"	The Madden Brothers	
28 July	"Only Love Can Hurt Like This"	Paloma Faith	
4 August	"Only Love Can Hurt Like This"	Paloma Faith	
11 August	"All About That Bass"	Meghan Trainor	
18 August	"All About That Bass"	Meghan Trainor	
25 August	"All About That Bass"	Meghan Trainor	
1 September	"Shake It Off"	Taylor Swift	
8 September	"Shake It Off"	Taylor Swift	
15 September	"Shake It Off"	Taylor Swift	
22 September	"All About That Bass"	Meghan Trainor	
29 September	"You Ruin Me"	The Veronicas	
6 October	"You Ruin Me"	The Veronicas	
13 October	"You Ruin Me"	The Veronicas	
20 October	"Thinking Out Loud"	Ed Sheeran	
27 October	"Thinking Out Loud"	Ed Sheeran	
3 November	"Thinking Out Loud"	Ed Sheeran	
10 November	"Thinking Out Loud"	Ed Sheeran	
17 November	"Thinking Out Loud"	Ed Sheeran	
24 November	"Blank Space"	Taylor Swift	
1 December	"Blank Space"	Taylor Swift	
8 December	"Blank Space"	Taylor Swift	
15 December	"Uptown Funk"	Mark Ronson featuring Bruno Mars	
22 December	"Uptown Funk"	Mark Ronson featuring Bruno Mars	
29 December	"Uptown Funk"	Mark Ronson featuring Bruno Mars	

== Number-one artists ==
Position	Artist	Weeks at No. 1
1	Pharrell Williams	12
2	Justice Crew	9
3	Ed Sheeran	6
3	Taylor Swift	6
4	Meghan Trainor	4
5	Sheppard	3
5	The Veronicas	3
5	Mark Ronson	3
5	Bruno Mars (as featuring)	3
6	The Madden Brothers	2
6	Paloma Faith	2
7	A Great Big World	1
7	Christina Aguilera	1
7	5 Seconds of Summer	1

== See also ==
- 2014 in music
- List of number-one dance singles of 2014 (Australia)
- List of number-one albums of 2014 (Australia)
- List of top 25 singles for 2014 in Australia
- List of top 10 singles in 2014 (Australia)
