= List of top 25 albums for 2014 in Australia =

Top 25 albums of 2014 < 2013 2015 >

Other Australian top charts for 2014
- top 25 singles
- Triple J Hottest 100

Australian number-one charts of 2014
- albums
- singles
- urban singles
- dance singles
- club tracks
- digital tracks
- streaming tracks

The following lists the top 25 albums of 2014 in Australia from the Australian Recording Industry Association (ARIA) end-of-year albums chart.

Ed Sheeran’s album x was the most popular album in 2014 in Australia. It spawned five top-ten singles and accrued six weeks at number one through the year, only behind INXS and their release The Very Best which held the top spot for 7 non-consecutive weeks and was the highest selling album in 2014 by an Australian artist.

Katy Perry's Prism was number 7 on the 2014 rankings, having already achieved the number 2 position in 2013. And Michael Bublé's Christmas appeared at number 8 on the 2014 chart, making it four successive years appearing in the top ten of the annual chart.

== Top 25 ==
#	Title	Artist	Highest pos. reached
1	x	Ed Sheeran	1
2	1989	Taylor Swift	1
3	Frozen (soundtrack)	Various artists	1
4	The Very Best	INXS	1
5	Ghost Stories	Coldplay	1
6	In the Lonely Hour	Sam Smith	2
7	Prism	Katy Perry	1
8	Christmas	Michael Bublé	1
9	Walking Under Stars	Hilltop Hoods	1
10	Jukebox	Human Nature	2
11	5 Seconds of Summer	5 Seconds of Summer	1
12	Built on Glass	Chet Faker	1
13	Rock or Bust	AC/DC	1
14	Four	One Direction	1
15	Pure Heroine	Lorde	1
16	Sonic Highways	Foo Fighters	1
17	Partners	Barbra Streisand	1
18	Girl	Pharrell Williams	1
19	30:30 Hindsight	Jimmy Barnes	1
20	AM	Arctic Monkeys	1
21	Triple J's Like a Version: Volume 10	Various artists	1
22	Guardians of the Galaxy (soundtrack)	Various artists	2
23	If You Wait	London Grammar	2
24	Let the Ocean Take Me	The Amity Affliction	1
25	The Endless River	Pink Floyd	3

- Note: In the Lonely Hour peaked at number 2 in 2014 and peaked at number 1 in April 2015.

== See also ==
- List of number-one albums of 2014 (Australia)
- List of Top 25 singles for 2014 in Australia
