= List of top 25 singles for 2014 in Australia =

Top 25 singles of 2014 < 2013 2015 >

Other Australian top charts for 2014
- top 25 albums
- Triple J Hottest 100

Australian number-one charts of 2014
- albums
- singles
- urban singles
- dance singles
- club tracks
- digital tracks
- streaming tracks

The following lists the top 25 singles of 2014 in Australia from the Australian Recording Industry Association (ARIA) end-of-year singles chart.

Pharrell Williams had the highest selling single in Australia in 2014 with "Happy".

#	Title	Artist	Highest pos. reached
1	"Happy"	Pharrell Williams	1
2	"All About That Bass"	Meghan Trainor	1
3	"Shake It Off"	Taylor Swift	1
4	"Geronimo"	Sheppard	1
5	"Que Sera"	Justice Crew	1
6	"Chandelier"	Sia	2
7	"Thinking Out Loud"	Ed Sheeran	1
8	"Stay With Me"	Sam Smith	5
9	"Freaks"	Timmy Trumpet and Savage	3
10	"Ugly Heart"	G.R.L.	2
11	"All of Me"	John Legend	1
12	"Fancy"	Iggy Azalea (featuring Charli XCX)	5
13	"Say Something"	A Great Big World (featuring Christina Aguilera)	1
14	"Rather Be"	Clean Bandit (featuring Jess Glynne)	2
15	"Stolen Dance"	Milky Chance	2
16	"Am I Wrong"	Nico & Vinz	2
17	"Only Love Can Hurt Like This"	Paloma Faith	1
18	"Problem"	Ariana Grande (featuring Iggy Azalea)	2
19	"Budapest"	George Ezra	5
20	"She Looks So Perfect"	5 Seconds Of Summer	1
21	"Waves"	Mr Probz	3
22	"You Ruin Me"	The Veronicas	1
23	"Swing"	Joel Fletcher (featuring Savage)	2
24	"We Are Done"	The Madden Brothers	1
25	"Let It Go"	Idina Menzel	16

== See also ==
- List of number-one singles of 2014 (Australia)
- List of Australian chart achievements and milestones
