= List of number-one urban singles of 2014 (Australia) =

ARIA Charts number-one urban singles of 2014 < 2013 2015 >

Other Australian number-one charts of 2014
- albums
- singles
- dance singles
- club tracks
- digital tracks
- streaming tracks

Top Australian singles and albums of 2014
- Triple J Hottest 100
- top 25 singles
- top 25 albums

The ARIA Urban Chart is a chart that ranks the best-performing Urban tracks singles of Australia. It is published by Australian Recording Industry Association (ARIA), an organisation who collect music data for the weekly ARIA Charts. To be eligible to appear on the chart, the recording must be a single, and be "predominantly of an urban nature".

== Chart history ==
Issue date	Song	Artist(s)	Reference
6 January	"Trumpets"	Jason Derulo	
13 January	"Trumpets"	Jason Derulo	
20 January	"Trumpets"	Jason Derulo	
27 January	"Trumpets"	Jason Derulo	
3 February	"All Of Me"	John Legend	
10 February	"All Of Me"	John Legend	
17 February	"All Of Me"	John Legend	
24 February	"All Of Me"	John Legend	
3 March	"All Of Me"	John Legend	
10 March	"All Of Me"	John Legend	
17 March	"All Of Me"	John Legend	
24 March	"Stupid Love"	Jason Derulo	
31 March	"All of Me"	John Legend	
7 April	"All of Me"	John Legend	
14 April	"Live It Up"	360 featuring Pez	
21 April	"Not a Bad Thing"	Justin Timberlake	
28 April	"Not a Bad Thing"	Justin Timberlake	
5 May	"Fancy"	Iggy Azalea featuring Charli XCX	
12 May	"Que Sera"	Justice Crew	
19 May	"Que Sera"	Justice Crew	
26 May	"Que Sera"	Justice Crew	
2 June	"Que Sera"	Justice Crew	
9 June	"Que Sera"	Justice Crew	
16 June	"Que Sera"	Justice Crew	
23 June	"Que Sera"	Justice Crew	
30 June	"Que Sera"	Justice Crew	
7 July	"Que Sera"	Justice Crew	
14 July	"Que Sera"	Justice Crew	
21 July	"Que Sera"	Justice Crew	
28 July	"Que Sera"	Justice Crew	
4 August	"Que Sera"	Justice Crew	
11 August	"Bang Bang"	Jessie J featuring Nicki Minaj and Ariana Grande	
18 August	"Bang Bang"	Jessie J featuring Nicki Minaj and Ariana Grande	
25 August	"Bang Bang"	Jessie J featuring Nicki Minaj and Ariana Grande	
1 September	"Anaconda"	Nicki Minaj	
8 September	"Anaconda"	Nicki Minaj	
15 September	"Bang Bang"	Jessie J featuring Nicki Minaj and Ariana Grande	
22 September	"Bang Bang"	Jessie J featuring Nicki Minaj and Ariana Grande	
29 September	"Bang Bang"	Jessie J featuring Nicki Minaj and Ariana Grande	
6 October	"Bang Bang"	Jessie J featuring Nicki Minaj and Ariana Grande	
13 October	"Bang Bang"	Jessie J featuring Nicki Minaj and Ariana Grande	
20 October	"Bang Bang"	Jessie J featuring Nicki Minaj and Ariana Grande	
27 October	"Cosby Sweater"	Hilltop Hoods	
3 November	"Rise & Fall"	Justice Crew	
10 November	"Cosby Sweater"	Hilltop Hoods	
17 November	"Cosby Sweater"	Hilltop Hoods	
24 November	"Cosby Sweater"	Hilltop Hoods	
1 December	"Uptown Funk"	Mark Ronson featuring Bruno Mars	
8 December	"Uptown Funk"	Mark Ronson featuring Bruno Mars	
15 December	"Uptown Funk"	Mark Ronson featuring Bruno Mars	
22 December	"Uptown Funk"	Mark Ronson featuring Bruno Mars	
29 December	"Uptown Funk"	Mark Ronson featuring Bruno Mars	

== Number-one artists ==
Position	Artist	Weeks at No. 1
1	Justice Crew	14
2	Nicki Minaj	11
3	Ariana Grande	9
3	Jessie J	9
3	John Legend	9
4	Bruno Mars	5
4	Jason Derulo	5
4	Mark Ronson	5
4	Jason Derulo	5
5	Hilltop Hoods	4
6	Justin Timberlake	2
7	360	1
7	Charli XCX	1
7	Iggy Azalea	1
7	Pez	1

== See also ==
- 2014 in music
- List of number-one singles of 2014 (Australia)
