= List of number-one digital tracks of 2014 (Australia) =

ARIA Charts number-one digital tracks of 2014 < 2013 2015 >

Other Australian number-one charts of 2014
- albums
- singles
- urban singles
- dance singles
- club tracks
- streaming tracks

Top Australian singles and albums of 2014
- Triple J Hottest 100
- top 25 singles
- top 25 albums

The ARIA Digital Track Chart is a chart that ranks the best-performing digital tracks singles of Australia. It is published by Australian Recording Industry Association (ARIA), an organisation who collect music data for the weekly ARIA Charts. To be eligible to appear on the chart, the recording must be a single not an EP and only paid downloads counted from downloadable outlets.

== Chart history ==
Key
†	Indicates number-one digital single of 2014

Issue date	Song	Artist(s)	Reference
6 January	"Happy"†	Pharrell Williams	
13 January	"Happy"†	Pharrell Williams	
20 January	"Happy"†	Pharrell Williams	
27 January	"Happy"†	Pharrell Williams	
3 February	"Happy"†	Pharrell Williams	
10 February	"Happy"†	Pharrell Williams	
17 February	"Happy"†	Pharrell Williams	
24 February	"Happy"†	Pharrell Williams	
3 March	"Happy"†	Pharrell Williams	
10 March	"Happy"†	Pharrell Williams	
17 March	"Happy"†	Pharrell Williams	
24 March	"Happy"†	Pharrell Williams	
31 March	"Happy"†	Pharrell Williams	
7 April	"Happy"†	Pharrell Williams	
14 April	"Geronimo"	Sheppard	
21 April	"Geronimo"	Sheppard	
28 April	"Geronimo"	Sheppard	
5 May	"Sing"	Ed Sheeran	
12 May	"Que Sera"	Justice Crew	
19 May	"Que Sera"	Justice Crew	
26 May	"Que Sera"	Justice Crew	
2 June	"Que Sera"	Justice Crew	
9 June	"Que Sera"	Justice Crew	
16 June	"Que Sera"	Justice Crew	
23 June	"Que Sera"	Justice Crew	
30 June	"Que Sera"	Justice Crew	
7 July	"Que Sera"	Justice Crew	
14 July	"We Are Done"	The Madden Brothers	
21 July	"We Are Done"	The Madden Brothers	
28 July	"Only Love Can Hurt Like This"	Paloma Faith	
4 August	"Only Love Can Hurt Like This"	Paloma Faith	
11 August	"All About That Bass"	Meghan Trainor	
18 August	"All About That Bass"	Meghan Trainor	
25 August	"All About That Bass"	Meghan Trainor	
1 September	"Shake It Off"	Taylor Swift	
8 September	"Shake It Off"	Taylor Swift	
15 September	"Shake It Off"	Taylor Swift	
22 September	"All About That Bass"	Meghan Trainor	
29 September	"You Ruin Me"	The Veronicas	
6 October	"You Ruin Me"	The Veronicas	
13 October	"You Ruin Me"	The Veronicas	
20 October	"Thinking Out Loud"	Ed Sheeran	
27 October	"Thinking Out Loud"	Ed Sheeran	
3 November	"Thinking Out Loud"	Ed Sheeran	
10 November	"Thinking Out Loud"	Ed Sheeran	
17 November	"Thinking Out Loud"	Ed Sheeran	
24 November	"Blank Space"	Taylor Swift	
1 December	"Blank Space"	Taylor Swift	
8 December	"Blank Space"	Taylor Swift	
15 December	"Uptown Funk"	Mark Ronson featuring Bruno Mars	
22 December	"Uptown Funk"	Mark Ronson featuring Bruno Mars	
29 December	"Uptown Funk"	Mark Ronson featuring Bruno Mars	

== Number-one artists ==
Position	Artist	Weeks at No. 1
1	Pharrell Williams	14
2	Justice Crew	9
3	Ed Sheeran	6
3	Taylor Swift	6
4	Meghan Trainor	4
5	Bruno Mars (as featuring)	3
5	Mark Ronson	3
5	Sheppard	3
5	The Veronicas	3
6	The Madden Brothers	2
6	Paloma Faith	2

== See also ==
- 2014 in music
- List of number-one singles of 2014 (Australia)
