= List of number-one streaming tracks of 2014 (Australia) =

ARIA Charts number-one streaming tracks of 2014 < 2013 2015 >

Other Australian number-one charts of 2014
- albums
- singles
- urban singles
- dance singles
- club tracks
- digital tracks

Top Australian singles and albums of 2014
- Triple J Hottest 100
- top 25 singles
- top 25 albums

The ARIA Streaming Chart ranks the best-performing streaming tracks of Australia. It is published by Australian Recording Industry Association (ARIA), an organisation who collects music data for the weekly ARIA Charts.

== Chart history ==
Key
†	Indicates number-one Streaming single of 2014

Issue date	Song	Artist(s)	Reference
6 January	"The Monster"	Eminem featuring Rihanna	
13 January	"Happy"†	Pharrell Williams	
20 January	"Happy"†	Pharrell Williams	
27 January	"Happy"†	Pharrell Williams	
3 February	"Happy"†	Pharrell Williams	
10 February	"Happy"†	Pharrell Williams	
17 February	"Happy"†	Pharrell Williams	
24 February	"Happy"†	Pharrell Williams	
3 March	"Happy"†	Pharrell Williams	
10 March	"Happy"†	Pharrell Williams	
17 March	"Happy"†	Pharrell Williams	
24 March	"Rather Be"	Clean Bandit featuring Jess Glynne	
31 March	"Rather Be"	Clean Bandit featuring Jess Glynne	
7 April	"Rather Be"	Clean Bandit featuring Jess Glynne	
14 April	"Rather Be"	Clean Bandit featuring Jess Glynne	
21 April	"Rather Be"	Clean Bandit featuring Jess Glynne	
28 April	"Rather Be"	Clean Bandit featuring Jess Glynne	
5 May	"Rather Be"	Clean Bandit featuring Jess Glynne	
12 May	"Fancy"	Iggy Azalea featuring Charli XCX	
19 May	"Problem"	Ariana Grande featuring Iggy Azalea	
26 May	"Problem"	Ariana Grande featuring Iggy Azalea	
2 June	"Fancy"	Iggy Azalea featuring Charli XCX	
9 June	"Fancy"	Iggy Azalea featuring Charli XCX	
16 June	"Fancy"	Iggy Azalea featuring Charli XCX	
23 June	"Fancy"	Iggy Azalea featuring Charli XCX	
30 June	"Fancy"	Iggy Azalea featuring Charli XCX	
7 July	"Fancy"	Iggy Azalea featuring Charli XCX	
14 July	"Fancy"	Iggy Azalea featuring Charli XCX	
21 July	"Am I Wrong"	Nico & Vinz	
28 July	"Am I Wrong"	Nico & Vinz	
4 August	"Am I Wrong"	Nico & Vinz	
11 August	"Stay with Me"	Sam Smith	
18 August	"All About That Bass"	Meghan Trainor	
25 August	"All About That Bass"	Meghan Trainor	
1 September	"All About That Bass"	Meghan Trainor	
8 September	"All About That Bass"	Meghan Trainor	
15 September	"All About That Bass"	Meghan Trainor	
22 September	"Blame"	Calvin Harris featuring John Newman	
29 September	"Blame"	Calvin Harris featuring John Newman	
6 October	"Blame"	Calvin Harris featuring John Newman	
13 October	"Shake It Off"	Taylor Swift	
20 October	"Shake It Off"	Taylor Swift	
27 October	"Shake It Off"	Taylor Swift	
3 November	"Shake It Off"	Taylor Swift	
10 November	"Thinking Out Loud"	Ed Sheeran	
17 November	"Thinking Out Loud"	Ed Sheeran	
24 November	"Thinking Out Loud"	Ed Sheeran	
1 December	"Thinking Out Loud"	Ed Sheeran	
8 December	"Thinking Out Loud"	Ed Sheeran	
15 December	"Uptown Funk"	Mark Ronson featuring Bruno Mars	
22 December	"Uptown Funk"	Mark Ronson featuring Bruno Mars	
29 December	"Uptown Funk"	Mark Ronson featuring Bruno Mars	

== Number-one artists ==
Position	Artist	Weeks at No. 1
1	Iggy Azalea	10
1	Pharrell Williams	10
2	Charli XCX	8
3	Clean Bandit	7
3	Jess Glynne	7
4	Ed Sheeran	5
4	Meghan Trainor	5
5	Taylor Swift	4
6	Calvin Harris	3
6	John Newman	3
6	Mark Ronson	3
6	Bruno Mars	3
6	Nico & Vinz	3
7	Ariana Grande	2
8	Eminem	1
8	Rihanna	1
8	Sam Smith	1

== See also ==
- 2014 in music
- List of number-one singles of 2014 (Australia)
