= List of number-one dance singles of 2014 (Australia) =

ARIA Charts number-one dance singles of 2014 < 2013 2015 >

Other Australian number-one charts of 2014
- albums
- singles
- urban singles
- club tracks
- digital tracks
- streaming tracks

Top Australian singles and albums of 2014
- Triple J Hottest 100
- top 25 singles
- top 25 albums

The ARIA Dance Chart is a chart that ranks the best-performing dance singles of Australia. It is published by Australian Recording Industry Association (ARIA), an organisation who collect music data for the weekly ARIA Charts. To be eligible to appear on the chart, the recording must be a single, and be "predominantly of a dance nature, or with a featured track of a dance nature, or included in the ARIA Club Chart or a comparable overseas chart".

In 2014, thirteen singles have topped the chart so far (as of issue date 15 December). "Freaks" by Timmy Trumpet featuring Savage is the longest-running chart-topping dance single of 2014, they were number one for thirteen consecutive weeks.

== Chart history ==
Issue date	Song	Artist(s)	Reference
6 January	"Timber"	Pitbull featuring Kesha	
13 January	"Free"	Rudimental featuring Emeli Sandé and Nas	
20 January	"Swing"	Joel Fletcher and Savage	
27 January	"Swing"	Joel Fletcher and Savage	
3 February	"Swing"	Joel Fletcher and Savage	
10 February	"Swing"	Joel Fletcher and Savage	
17 February	"Swing"	Joel Fletcher and Savage	
24 February	"Rather Be"	Clean Bandit featuring Jess Glynne	
3 March	"Rather Be"	Clean Bandit featuring Jess Glynne	
10 March	"Rather Be"	Clean Bandit featuring Jess Glynne	
17 March	"Rather Be"	Clean Bandit featuring Jess Glynne	
24 March	"Rather Be"	Clean Bandit featuring Jess Glynne	
31 March	"Rather Be"	Clean Bandit featuring Jess Glynne	
7 April	"Rather Be"	Clean Bandit featuring Jess Glynne	
14 April	"Rather Be"	Clean Bandit featuring Jess Glynne	
21 April	"Summer"	Calvin Harris	
28 April	"Summer"	Calvin Harris	
5 May	"Bad"	David Guetta and Showtek featuring Vassy	
12 May	"Bad"	David Guetta and Showtek featuring Vassy	
19 May	"Faded"	Zhu	
26 May	"Faded"	Zhu	
2 June	"Faded"	Zhu	
9 June	"Faded"	Zhu	
16 June	"Faded"	Zhu	
23 June	"Faded"	Zhu	
30 June	"Faded"	Zhu	
7 July	"Faded"	Zhu	
14 July	"Break Free"	Ariana Grande featuring Zedd	
21 July	"Lovers on the Sun"	David Guetta featuring Sam Martin	
28 July	"Lovers on the Sun"	David Guetta featuring Sam Martin	
4 August	"Break Free"	Ariana Grande featuring Zedd	
11 August	"Break Free"	Ariana Grande featuring Zedd	
18 August	"Freaks"	Timmy Trumpet featuring Savage	
25 August	"Freaks"	Timmy Trumpet featuring Savage	
1 September	"Freaks"	Timmy Trumpet featuring Savage	
8 September	"Freaks"	Timmy Trumpet featuring Savage	
15 September	"Freaks"	Timmy Trumpet featuring Savage	
22 September	"Freaks"	Timmy Trumpet featuring Savage	
29 September	"Freaks"	Timmy Trumpet featuring Savage	
6 October	"Freaks"	Timmy Trumpet featuring Savage	
13 October	"Freaks"	Timmy Trumpet featuring Savage	
20 October	"Freaks"	Timmy Trumpet featuring Savage	
27 October	"Freaks"	Timmy Trumpet featuring Savage	
3 November	"Freaks"	Timmy Trumpet featuring Savage	
10 November	"Freaks"	Timmy Trumpet featuring Savage	
17 November	"Dangerous"	David Guetta featuring Sam Martin	
24 November	"Ah Yeah So What"	Will Sparks featuring Wiley & Elen Levon	
1 December	"Ah Yeah So What"	Will Sparks featuring Wiley & Elen Levon	
8 December	"I'm an Albatraoz"	AronChupa	
15 December	"I'm an Albatraoz"	AronChupa	
22 December	"I'm an Albatraoz"	AronChupa	
29 December	"I'm an Albatraoz"	AronChupa	

== Number-one artists ==
Position	Artist	Weeks at No. 1
1	Savage (as featuring)	18
2	Timmy Trumpet	13
3	Clean Bandit	8
3	Jess Glynne (as featuring)	8
3	Zhu	8
4	Joel Fletcher	5
5	Zedd	4
5	Aronchupa	4
6	David Guetta	3
7	Calvin Harris	2
7	Showtek	2
7	Vassy (as featuring)	2
7	Wiley (as featuring)	2
7	Will Sparks	2
8	Pitbull	1
8	Kesha (as featuring)	1
8	Rudimental	1

== See also ==
- 2014 in music
- List of number-one singles of 2014 (Australia)
- List of number-one club tracks of 2014 (Australia)
