= 2014 in music =

This topic covers notable events and articles related to 2014 in music.

== Specific locations ==
- African music
- American music
- Asian music
- Australian music
- Brazilian music
- British music
- Canadian music
- Chinese music
- Danish music
- European music (Continental Europe)
- Finnish music
- French music
- German music
- Indian music
- Irish music
- Japanese music
- Malaysian music
- Mongolian music
- North Korean music
- Norwegian music
- Philippine music
- Polynesian music
- Scandinavian music
- South Korean music
- Swedish music
- Taiwanese music
- Vietnamese music
- World music

== Specific genres ==
- Classical
- Country
- Electronic
- Heavy metal
- Hip-hop
- Jazz
- Latin
- Opera
- Pop
- Progressive rock
- Rock
- K-pop
- J-pop

== Awards ==
Category/Organization	2014 MTV Video Music Awards August 24, 2014	2014 MTV Europe Music Awards November 9, 2014	American Music Awards of 2014 November 23, 2014	2015 Grammy Awards February 8, 2015	2015 Billboard Music Awards May 17, 2015
Best Album	N/A	N/A	N/A	Morning Phase; Beck	1989; Taylor Swift
Best Song	N/A	"Problem"; Ariana Grande featuring Iggy Azalea	"Dark Horse"; Katy Perry featuring Juicy J	"Stay with Me"; Sam Smith	"All About That Bass"; Meghan Trainor
Best Video	"Wrecking Ball"; Miley Cyrus	"Dark Horse"; Katy Perry featuring Juicy J	N/A	"Happy"; Pharrell Williams	"Shake It Off"; Taylor Swift
Best Artist	N/A	N/A	One Direction	Sam Smith	Taylor Swift
Best New Artist	Fifth Harmony	5 Seconds of Summer	5 Seconds of Summer	Sam Smith	Sam Smith

== Bands formed ==
- Akdong Musician
- Antemasque
- American Wrestlers
- The Babe Rainbow
- Berry Good
- The Beths
- Brockhampton
- Cafuné
- Cheat Codes
- Drain
- FFS
- Fiddlehead
- Finom
- Goose
- Great Grandpa
- Gunship
- High4
- Hot Mulligan
- Hotshot
- I'm with Her
- LANY
- Lovelyz
- Lip Service
- Maddie & Tae
- Mamamoo
- Melody Day
- Men I Trust
- Michigander
- Missio
- No Devotion
- Oh Wonder
- Operation: Mindcrime
- Oso Oso
- Pale Waves
- Post Animal
- Red Velvet
- Remember Sports
- Sonamoo
- Saint Asonia
- Shame
- The Shelters
- Sheer Mag
- Slaughter Beach, Dog
- Slaves
- Sofi Tukker
- Soul Glo
- The Spirit of the Beehive
- Stereo Kicks
- Teenage Wrist
- Toheart
- Ultimate Painting
- Uranium Club
- The War and Treaty
- Winner
- You+Me

== Bands reformed ==
- Aiden
- American Football
- Atreyu
- Babes In Toyland
- Basement
- Breaking Benjamin
- Constantines
- Copeland
- Deep Dish
- Despised Icon
- Design the Skyline
- Electric Light Orchestra (Now credited as Jeff Lynne's ELO)
- Erase Errata
- Failure
- From Autumn to Ashes
- Haste the Day
- L7
- The Libertines
- Luna
- The Matches
- Metro Station
- Midtown
- Mineral
- Nickel Creek
- OutKast
- Ride
- Saosin
- Sleater-Kinney
- Slowdive
- Trick Pony
- The Unicorns

== Bands on hiatus ==
- As I Lay Dying
- Darkside
- Dredg
- Foxy Shazam
- Furthur
- The Wanted
- Yeah Yeah Yeahs

== Bands disbanded ==
- Abandon All Ships
- The Allman Brothers Band
- Anberlin
- As Blood Runs Black
- Austrian Death Machine
- Beady Eye
- Beastie Boys
- Beneath the Sky
- The Blackout
- Bleeding Through
- Bomb the Music Industry!
- Brown Bird
- Camp Freddy
- Chimaira
- The Civil Wars
- Clipse
- Company of Thieves
- Crystal Castles
- Danity Kane
- The Dangerous Summer
- Eleventyseven
- For All Those Sleeping
- Guided by Voices
- HotCha
- Jethro Tull
- The Knife
- Lestat
- LFO
- The Luchagors
- Morning Parade
- The Move
- Orbital
- Nightmare Boyzzz
- Nachtmystium
- Pink Floyd
- The Rapture
- Richard Cheese and Lounge Against the Machine
- Rob Base and DJ E-Z Rock
- Slaughterhouse
- Smith Westerns
- The Swellers
- Ten Second Epic
- There for Tomorrow
- Vista Chino
- Vivian Girls
- WC and the Maad Circle

== Deaths ==
=== January ===
- 4 – Phil Everly (74), American musician (The Everly Brothers)
- 13 – Ronny Jordan (51), British guitarist.
- 18 – Dennis Frederiksen (62), American singer (Toto), (Survivor)
- 27 – Pete Seeger (94), American guitarist.

=== February ===
- 5 – Samantha Juste (69), English-American singer and television host.
- 8 – Finbarr Dwyer (67), Irish accordionist and fiddler.
- 16 – Raymond Louis Kennedy, 67, American pop-rock singer-songwriter
- 17
  - Frank Wappat (84), British DJ and singer.
  - Bob Casale, (61), American guitarist and keyboardist (Devo).
- 23 – Chip Damiani, (68), American drummer (The Remains)
- 24 – Franny Beecher (92), American guitarist.
- 25
  - Paco de Lucía (66), Spanish virtuoso flamenco guitarist, composer and producer.
  - Peter Callander (74), English songwriter and record producer.

=== March ===
- 5 – Dave Sampson (73), English singer.
- 6 – Marion Stein (Thorpe) (87), British pianist.

=== April ===
- 2 – Lyndsie Holland (75), English actress and singer.
- 7 – John Shirley-Quirk (83), British operatic bass-baritone.
- 16 – Stan Kelly-Bootle (84), British songwriter, author and computer engineer.
- 17 – Cheo Feliciano (78), Puerto Rican singer and composer (Joe Cuba Sextet)
- 18 – Brian Priestman (87), British conductor (Denver Symphony Orchestra).

=== May ===
- 13 – Akihiro Yokoyama (49), Japanese thrash metal bassist (United)
- 19 – Nima Varasteh (35), Iranian musician
- 25 – Herb Jeffries (100), American singer and actor.

=== June ===
- 18 – Horace Silver (85), American jazz pianist.
- 21 – Jimmy C. Newman (86), country music singer.

=== July ===
- 3 – Jesse Anderson (73), American blues singer-songwriter and musician.
- 11 – Charlie Haden (76), American upright-bassist.
- 19 – Lionel Ferbos (103), American trumpeter.
- 24 – Christian Falk (52), Swedish record producer and musician.

=== August ===
- 1 – Michael Johns (35), Australian singer and American Idol contestant.
- 3 – Yvette Giraud (97), French singer and actress.
- 15 – Svein Nymo (61), Norwegian violinist and composer.
- 17 – Pierre Vassiliu (76), Swiss-born French singer.
- 19 – Kåre Kolberg (78), Norwegian composer.
- 23 – Inga Juuso (68), singer and actress.
- 24 – Aldo Donati (66), Italian singer, composer and television personality, (cerebral hemorrhage)
- 29
  - Jan Groth (68), Norwegian singer (Aunt Mary, Just 4 Fun), (cancer).
  - Peret (79), Spanish singer, guitarist and composer.

=== September ===
- 1 – Jimi Jamison (63), American singer (Survivor)
- 2 – Antonis Vardis (66), Greek composer and singer.
- 8
  - Magda Olivero (104), Italian soprano.
  - Gerald Wilson (96), American jazz trumpeter.
- 12 – Joe Sample (75), American pianist.
- 15 – Jackie Cain (86), American jazz singer (Jackie & Roy).
- 17 – George Hamilton IV (77), American country music singer.
- 18 – Kenny Wheeler (84), Canadian jazz composer, trumpeter and flugelhorn player.

=== October ===
- 1 – Lynsey de Paul (66), English singer
- 10 – Olav Dale (55), Norwegian jazz saxophonist, composer and orchestra leader.
- 16 – Tim Hauser (72), American jazz singer.
- 20 - Tyson Stevens (29), vocals, additional guitar, bass guitar in Arizona Post Hardcore band Scary Kids Scaring Kids.
- 23 – Alvin Stardust (72), English singer
- 25 – Jack Bruce (71), Scottish bassist, composer and orchestra leader.

=== November ===
- 6 – Maggie Boyle (57), British folk singer and musician (cancer).
- 14 – Mike Burney (70), British jazz saxophonist.
- 15 – Cherry Wainer (79), South African-born British organist (Lord Rockingham's XI).
- 17
  - Jeff Fletcher (36), British guitarist (Northern Uproar).
  - Jimmy Ruffin (78), American soul singer
- 20 – Arthur Butterworth (91), English composer and conductor.
- 27 - Érick Bamy, 64, French singer and Johnny Hallyday's former backing vocalist from 1973 to 2000.

=== December ===
- 8 – Knut Nystedt (99), Norwegian composer.
- 12 – John Persen (73), Norwegian composer.
- 22 – Joe Cocker (70), English singer
- 24 – Buddy DeFranco (91), American jazz clarinetist.
- 31 – Michael Kennedy (88), English writer on music.

== Musical films ==
- God Help the Girl
- Whiplash

== See also ==
- Timeline of musical events
- Women in music
