= 2014 in classical music =

== Events ==
- January 1 – The Vienna Philharmonic Orchestra gives its annual New Year Concert at the Musikverein; Daniel Barenboim conducts a programme that includes Josef Strauss's "Friedenspalmen", in recognition of the centenary of the outbreak of the First World War.
- January 14 – The musicians of the Minnesota Orchestra ratify a new contract, ending a 15-month lockout.
- January 23 – English National Opera announces simultaneously that Edward Gardner is conclude his tenure as music director in 2015, and that Mark Wigglesworth is to succeed Gardner as ENO Music Director.
- January 26 – At the 56th Annual Grammy Awards, Maria Schneider's Winter Morning Walks wins two awards.
- February 18 – Violinist Vanessa-Mae competes for Thailand at the 2014 Winter Olympics in Sochi.
- March 26 – The Orchestra Haydn announces the appointment of Arvo Volmer as its next chief conductor, effective September 1, 2014, with an initial contract of 3 years.
- April 1 – A 90th birthday concert for Sir Neville Marriner is held by the Academy of St Martin-in-the-Fields at the Royal Festival Hall, with soloists Joshua Bell and Murray Perahia.
- April 22 – The Royal Concertgebouw Orchestra announces that Mariss Jansons is to conclude his chief conductorship of the orchestra after the 2014–2015 season.
- April 24
  - Operatic tenor Ben Heppner announces his retirement from opera and concert performance, but continues as a broadcaster.
  - The Minnesota Orchestra announces the re-appointment of Osmo Vänskä as its music director, with a 2-year contract.
- April 28 – Julian Lloyd Webber announces his retirement from playing cello and performance owing to a herniated disc in his neck which has reduced the power of his bowing arm.
- May 6 – The Munich Radio Orchestra announces that Ulf Schirmer is to conclude this tenure as its chief conductor at the end of the 2016–2017 season.
- May 13 – Anonymous 4 announces that the 2015–2016 season is to be their final season before disbanding the ensemble.
- May 28 – The Royal Northern Sinfonia announces the appointment of Lars Vogt as its next music director, effective September 2015.
- June 6 – The Luxembourg Philharmonic Orchestra announces the appointment of Gustavo Gimeno as its next music director, effective with the 2015–2016 season.
- June 21 – Zubin Mehta receives a lifetime achievement award at the 42nd Istanbul Music Festival.
- July 17 – Roger Wright concludes his tenure as Controller of BBC Radio 3 and Controller of The Proms, with Edward Blakeman becoming interim Controller of The Proms.
- July 22 – Judith Weir formally takes up the post of Master of the Queen's Music, the first woman ever to hold the title.
- August 31 – The Danish National Symphony Orchestra announces the appointment of Fabio Luisi as its next principal conductor, effective in 2017, with an initial contract through 2020.
- September 1 – The Helsinki Philharmonic Orchestra announces the appointment of Susanna Mälkki as its next chief conductor, effective in the autumn 2016, with an initial contract of 3 years.
- September 5
  - The I,CULTURE Orchestra announces the appointment of Kirill Karabits as its new artistic director.
  - Franz Welser-Möst resigns as Generalmusikdirektor of the Vienna State Opera, with immediate effect.
- September 8 – Han-na Chang resigns as music director of the Qatar Philharmonic Orchestra with immediate effect, the day after the orchestra's debut at The Proms.
- September 13 – The Last Night of the Proms is held at the Royal Albert Hall, with Sakari Oramo conducting his first Last Night and Roderick Williams as the soloist for "Rule Britannia".
- September 17 – Sinfonia ViVA announces the appointment of Duncan Ward as its next principal conductor, effective in January 2015, for an initial contract of 2 years.
- September 26 – The BBC announces the appointment of Alan Davey as the next Controller of Radio 3, effective January 2015.
- October 3 – The Royal Concertgebouw Orchestra announces the appointment of Daniele Gatti as its 7th chief conductor, effective with the 2016–2017 season.
- October 8 – The New Jersey Symphony Orchestra announces that Jacques Lacombe is to conclude his music directorship of the orchestra after the 2015–2016 season.
- October 20 – The first Metropolitan Opera performance of The Death of Klinghoffer, following protests in the months prior to its production.
- October 22
  - The BBC Scottish Symphony Orchestra announces that Donald Runnicles is to conclude his tenure as chief conductor after the 2015–2016 season.
  - The Prague Philharmonia announces the appointment of Emmanuel Villaume as its new chief conductor, effective with the 2015–2016 season, with an initial contract of 3 years.
- October 30 – Conductor and composer Michael Gielen announces his retirement from the concert platform on health grounds.
- November 3 – The Basque National Orchestra (Euskadiko Orkestra) announces the appointment of Jun Märkl as chief conductor with immediate effect, through the 2015–2016 season.
- November 5 – The Berlin Radio Choir announces the appointment of Gijs Leenaars as its next principal conductor, effective August 2015.
- November 8 – Ratification of a new contract by the musicians of the Atlanta Symphony Orchestra, ending a 2-month lockout.
- December 7 – Violence breaks out on the opening night of the La Scala opera season, traditionally used by political demonstrators to draw attention to their causes. The audience at the performance of Fidelio, conducted by Daniel Barenboim, includes Giorgio Armani, Italy's president Giorgio Napolitano, and prime minister Matteo Renzi.
- December 20 – The Hilliard Ensemble give their final concert at Wigmore Hall before disbanding.

== New works ==
The following composers' works were composed, premiered, or published this year, as noted in the citation.

=== A ===
- Matthew Aucoin
  - Three Études for solo piano
  - The Orphic Moment, dramatic cantata for countertenor, solo violin, and chamber ensemble
  - Celan Fragments, violin and piano
  - Piano Trio

=== B ===
- Vykintas Baltakas – Redditio 2
- Christian Billian – Unwuchten
- Annesley Black – A Piece That Is a Size That Is Recognised as Not a Size but a Piece

=== C ===
- Friedrich Cerha
  - Tagebuch für Orchester
  - Drei Orchesterstücke
- Unsuk Chin – Clarinet Concerto

=== D ===
- Jonathan Dove – Gaia Theory

=== G ===
- Peter Gahn – Nachtsicht II
- Philip Glass – String Quartet No. 7
- Henryk Górecki – Symphony No. 4

=== H ===
- Georg Friedrich Haas
  - Dark Dreams
  - Concerto Grosso No 1
  - Concerto Grosso No 2
- Gavin Higgins – Velocity
- Simon Holt – Morpheus Wakes
- James Horner – Pas de Deux

=== M ===
- Benedict Mason – Meld
- James MacMillan – Viola Concerto

=== O ===
- Christoph Ogiermann – Inner Empire II

=== P ===
- Arvo Pärt – Swan Song
- Brice Pauset – Arbeiten
- Matthias Pintscher – Idyll for orchestra
- Gabriel Prokofiev – Violin Concerto

=== S ===
- Kaija Saariaho – Maan Varjot
- Aulis Sallinen – String Quartet No. 6, Op. 103
- Martin Schüttler – MEUTEN
- Jay Schwartz – Delta – Music for Orchestra IV
- Hannes Seidl – Mehr als die Hälfte
- Adam Stern (conductor) – Spirits of the Dead (after Edgar Allan Poe) for narrator and orchestra
- Jagoda Szmytka – Empty Music

=== T ===
- John Tavener
  - Gnosis
  - Requiem Fragments
- Hans Thomalla – Wonderblock

=== V ===
- Michel van der Aa – Violin Concerto

=== W ===
- Judith Weir – Day Break Shadows Flee
- Ryan Wigglesworth – Violin Concerto
- Julia Wolfe – Anthracite Fields

== Opera premieres ==
- January 26 – Breaking Bad – Ozymandias by Sung Jin Hong (based on the television drama series Breaking Bad)
- April 3
  - Under Milk Wood: An Opera by John Metcalf
  - Through His Teeth by Luke Bedford and David Harrower
- May 3 – Thebans by Julian Anderson and Frank McGuinness
- June 13 – An American Soldier by Huang Ruo and David Henry Hwang
- June 14 – 27 by Ricky Ian Gordon and Royce Vavrek
- July 19 – Zeisls Hiob by Erich Zeisl and Jan Duszyński at the Bayerische Staatsoper.

== Albums ==
- Pierre-Laurent Aimard – Bach: The Well-Tempered Clavier
- Nicola Benedetti – Homecoming
- Ludovico Einaudi – Islands
- Benjamin Grosvenor – Dances
- Craig Ogden – Summer Guitar
- Emmanuel Pahud & Christian Rivet – Around the World

== Deaths ==
- January 6 – H. Owen Reed, American composer, conductor and educator, 103
- January 10 – Aram Gharabekian, Armenian conductor, 58
- January 19 – Udo Kasemets, Estonian-born Canadian composer, 94
- January 20 – Claudio Abbado, Italian conductor, 80
- January 28 – Dwight Gustafson, American composer and conductor, 83
- January 31 – Alexander Ivashkin, Russian cellist, 65 (cancer)
- February 1 – Elisabetta Barbato, Italian soprano, 92
- February 2 – Gerd Albrecht, German conductor, 78
- February 14 – Martha Goldstein, American harpsichordist, 94
- February 15 – Dénes Zsigmondy, Hungarian violinist and music educator, 91.
- February 24 – Nicolae Herlea, Romanian baritone, 86
- March 6 – Marion Stein (Thorpe), British pianist, 87
- April 1 – Anker Buch, Danish violinist, 74
- April 2 – Harris Goldsmith, American pianist and critic, 77
- April 18 – Brian Priestman, conductor (Denver Symphony Orchestra), 87
- April 24 – Konstantin Orbelyan, Armenian composer and conductor, 85
- May 6 – Antony Hopkins, British composer, conductor and pianist, 93
- May 7 – Sir George Christie, manager of Glyndebourne Opera, 79)
- May 19 – Franz-Paul Decker, German-born Canadian conductor, 90
- June 3 – Elodie Lauten, French-born minimalist composer, 63
- June 8 – Ivo Vinco, Italian operatic bass, 86
- June 9 – Gerd Zacher, German organist, composer and author, 84
- June 11 – Rafael Frühbeck de Burgos, Spanish conductor and composer, 80 (cancer)
- June 16 – Pierre D'Archambeau, Belgian-born American violin virtuoso and pedagogue, 87
- June 26 – Julius Rudel, Austrian-born American Grammy Award-winning conductor and director, 93
- July 1 – Oscar Yatco, Filipino conductor and violinist, 83
- July 9 – Lorenzo Álvarez Florentín, Paraguayan composer and violinist, 87
- July 13 – Lorin Maazel, French-born American conductor, violinist, composer and music director, 84
- July 24 – Nataša Danilović, Serbian composer, author of the orchestral piece Horror Vacui, 45
- July 25 – Carlo Bergonzi, Italian operatic tenor, 90
- August 7 – Cristina Deutekom, Dutch coloratura soprano opera singer, 82
- August 8 – Peter Sculthorpe, Australian composer
- August 13 – Frans Brüggen, Dutch conductor, recorder player and baroque flautist, 79
- August 15
  - Licia Albanese, Italian-born American operatic soprano, 105
  - Jan Ekier, Polish pianist and composer, 100
- September 19 – Francisco Feliciano, Filipino composer and conductor, 73
- September 24 – Christopher Hogwood, English conductor, harpsichordist, writer, and musicologist, 73
- October 4 – Konrad Boehmer, German-born Dutch composer and writer, 73
- October 11
  - Anita Cerquetti, Italian operatic soprano, 83
  - Mats Rondin, Swedish cellist and composer, 54 (heart attack)
- October 20 – Pavle Merkù, Slovene composer, 87
- October 21 – Stephen Paulus, American composer, 65
- October 31 – Ian Fraser, English composer and conductor, 81
- November 3 – Augusto Martelli, Italian composer, conductor, arranger and television personality, 74
- November 5 – Manitas de Plata, guitarist, 93
- November 11 – James Erb, US composer, arranger and musicologist, 88
- November 20 – Arthur Butterworth, English composer and conductor, 91
- November 21 – Wang Kun, Chinese opera singer and educator, 89
- November 25 – Petr Hapka, Czech composer, 70
- December 1 – Mario Abramovich, Argentine violinist and composer, 88
- December 5 – Manuel De Sica, Italian composer, 65 (heart attack)
- December 8
  - Nedunuri Krishnamurthy, Indian carnatic vocalist, 87
  - Knut Nystedt, Norwegian orchestral and choral composer, 99
- December 9 – José Feghali, Brazilian pianist, 53 (suicide) (body discovered on this date)
- December 11 – Hans Wallat, German conductor and music director, 85
- December 14 – William Stokking, American orchestral cellist, 81
- December 15
  - Chakri, Indian film composer and playback singer, 40 (heart attack)
  - Janis Martin, American opera singer, 75
  - Ray Steadman-Allen, British composer and Salvation Army officer, 92
- December 23 – Jerzy Semkow, Polish conductor, 86
- December 27 – Claude Frank, American pianist, 89
- December 30 – Patrick Gowers, British composer, 78
- December 31 – Michael Kennedy, British music critic and writer, 86

== Major awards ==
=== Grammy Awards ===
- Best Classical Contemporary Composition – Maria Schneider, Winter Morning Walks
- Best Orchestral Performance – Osmo Vänskä (conductor) and the Minnesota Orchestra, Sibelius: Symphonies Nos. 1 & 4
- Best Opera Recording – Adès: The Tempest
- Best Choral Performance – Tõnu Kaljuste (conductor) (with Tui Hirv & Rainer Vilu; Estonian Philharmonic Chamber Choir; Sinfonietta Riga and Tallinn Chamber Orchestra; Latvian Radio Choir & Vox Clamantis), Pärt: Adam's Lament
- Best Classical Vocal Solo – Dawn Upshaw, Winter Morning Walks
- Best Classical Instrumental Solo – Evelyn Glennie, Corigliano: Conjurer – Concerto for Percussionist & String Orchestra
- Best Classical Compendium – Christoph Eschenbach, Hindemith: Violinkonzert; Symphonic; Konzertmusik
- Best Chamber Music/Small Ensemble Performance – Roomful of Teeth

=== Avery Fisher Prize ===
- Jeremy Denk
