= 2014 in Brazilian music =

The following is a list of notable events that are related to Brazilian music in 2014.

== Festivals ==
=== April ===
- Lollapalooza, the third edition of the music festival in Brazil, took place from April 5 to April 6 in Autódromo José Carlos Pace, São Paulo.

== Albums released ==
=== January ===
- Lucas Lucco, Tá Diferente
- Mezatrio, O Topo do Nada
- Supercombo, Amianto

=== February ===
- Dilsinho, Dilsinho
- Graveola, Vozes Invisíveis
- Gusttavo Lima, Do Outro Lado da Moeda
- Juçara Marçal, Encarnado
- Mariene de Castro, Colheita
- Raimundos, Cantigas de Roda

=== March ===
- Kalouv, Pluvero
- Marcelo Perdido, Lenhador
- Raquel Mello, Há um Deus no Céu
- Sam Alves, Sam Alves
- Silva, Vista Pro Mar
- Vanessa da Mata, Segue o Som
- Fresno, Eu Sou a Maré Viva

=== April ===
- Dom Paulinho Lima, Dom Paulinho Lima
- Isaar, Todo Calor
- Ju Moraes, Em Cada Canto Um Samba
- Leo Cavalcanti, Despertador
- Maria Rita, Coração a Batucar
- O Teatro Mágico, Grão do Corpo
- Thiaguinho, Outro Dia, Outra História

=== May ===
- Daniela Araújo, Criador do Mundo
- Detonautas Roque Clube, A Saga Continua
- Far From Alaska, modeHuman
- Fernanda Takai, Na Medida do Impossível
- Gláucia Rosane, Casa do Sobrenatural
- Ludov, Miragem
- Mombojó, Alexandre
- Moreno Veloso, Coisa Boa
- Nação Zumbi, Nação Zumbi
- Paulo César Baruk, Graça
- Seu Cuca, MenteAberta
- Titãs, Nheengatu
- Transmissor, De Lá Não Ando Só
- Zezé Di Camargo & Luciano, Teorias de Raul

=== June ===
- Anitta, Ritmo Perfeito
- Luiz Melodia, Zerima
- Pitty, Setevidas
- Sérgio Lopes, Coração Discípulo
- Skank, Velocia

=== July ===
- Diante do Trono, Läpimurto

=== August ===
- Tânia Mara, Só Vejo Você

== Deaths ==
- January 5 – Nelson Ned, 66, singer and songwriter
- January 17 – Milky Mota, 25, singer
- January 20 – Márcio Vip Antonucci, 68, singer and producer
- February 2 – Nonato Buzar, 81, singer and producer
- February 3 – Giba Giba, 73, singer and songwriter
- February 7 – Nico Nicolaiewsky, 56, musician
- February 10 – Virgínia Lane, 93, singer
- March 14 – Paulo Schroeber, 40, guitarist (Almah)
- May 8 – Jair Rodrigues, 75, musician and singer
- May 14 – Alexandre Pessoal, 39, singer and songwriter
- June 7 – Helcio Milito, 83, drummer
- July 14 – Vange Leonel, 51, singer and songwriter
