= Unlikely =

Album by Far From Alaska

Studio album by Far from Alaska
- Released: August 4, 2017
- Genre: Stoner rock
- Length: 45:17
- Label: Elemess
- Producer: Sylvia Massy

Far from Alaska chronology
modeHuman (2014)	Unlikely (2017)

Singles from Unlikely
- 1. "Cobra" Released: 23 June 2017

Unlikely is the second album by Brazilian stoner rock band Far from Alaska, released on 4 August 2017. It was recorded in the United States, produced by Sylvia Massy and financed via a crowdfunding campaign. It is their last album with bassist Edu Filgueira, who left the band in January 2018.

The band sees the album as a more unpretentious and free work than its predecessor, modeHuman, and believes it to be more representative of what they really are. They wanted to create songs that were easier to sing along in shows and that could be easily played with an acoustic guitar in a circle of friends, for example. In studio, the members, encouraged by Masy, experimented with a couple of different things, like playing synths with the cables going through electricity-conducting food.

Like modeHuman, Unlikely was well received by the critics.

== Background ==
Searching for a producer for their second album, the band came upon experienced Sylvia Massy (Red Hot Chili Peppers, Johnny Cash, Tool, Foo Fighters, Björk, Prince and System of a Down) through a common friend she had with the band's manager, Thiago Endrigo. When asked about the importance of having a female producer, keyboardist and vocalist Cris Botarelli said:

This representation thing is very important! Since my adolescence I admire the work of musical producers. It's always been something I'd like to do, but I've never had a female model to mirror myself in, for example. This is probably very common for many other girls like me, who were teenagers in the 2000s. Access today is easier, with so many forums and communities in the internet, etc. Due to this and other reasons it was very important for us to choose Massy. Besides, obviously, the fact that she is absolutely incredible in what she does.

Still in January, they traveled to the United States to record the album, more precisely to the city of Ashland in Oregon. They arrived in the country with all songs already complete, except for "Coruja", which was written there during a week in which Massy was still away. In February, they announced the album title and a crowdfunding at the Kickante website to finance it. The idea of collectively financing the album was to make fans feel like part of the album's creation process. The campaign received a total of 68,700 reais.

In May, they invited some people for a listening session, but instead of simply reproducing it through speakers, they performed it live. On 6 August, only two days after the album's release, the band performed in Brasília and was surprised to see the public was already familiar with the lyrics, proving able to sing along with the band. Vocalist Emmily Barreto even tattooed the day, so much impact the experience had on her.

== Songwriting, recording and concepts ==
Unlikely was produced and recorded in approximately 20 days in Ashland, where the band rented a house from where they could reach The Foundation Soundstage studios by foot.

The band was pleased with the album because they finally achieved a sound "that is exactly us, both as a band and as individuals that like very different things. In relation to the previous album, I think [...] it is much less serious, less shy. When it's supposed to be heavy, it's very heavy, when it's music to sing along to, it's music to sing along to with eyes closed, you know? When it's music to dance to, it's like a nightclub, and that's it."

Botarelli also said, comparing the songwriting of Unlikely with the previous album's, modeHuman, that "this time we were more worried with writing more songs, you know? Being able to play the song on the acoustic guitar in a luau and it still be cool? We didn't have that much in the first one, it was more about big riffs, screams and go for it! It's still all that, but the melodies are cooler, I think."

In another interview, Botarelli said she considers that modeHuman "wasn't very good to sing along to because melodies were too complex. Sometimes, it was difficult to follow". Moreover, Barreto believes she was able to test herself further as a singer in the album, which had more room for the vocals.

Still in another occasion, Botarelli explained that "people started to see us as a stoner rock band. This upset us, we don't sustain this leather jacket and sunglasses image. When we worked on the album, we wanted people to understand who we are". In another interview, she said she believed "we are more relaxed as a band and as people as well, everyone is more confident of what everyone does in the band and we could play with that a little more."

Drummer Lauro Kirsch compares both albums as follows: "The first album was like: 'Ok, we're getting to know each other, let's see what happens.' And then we just played it. In this second one, we wanted to do something more planned."

One of the characteristics of Massy that the band most enjoyed was her will to experiment with different things in studio. For example, Botarelli recorded some of her synth parts with the electricity cables of the instrument and the amplifier placed on electricity-conducting food like sausages, lemons and picles, which slightly modified the sound without compromising its operation. They did the same with a lamp and a drill. Kirsch, on the other hand, recorded some drum lines with a microphone pointed at his own penis, which, according to him, allowed them to capture a different frequency of the drum components.

About the electronic elements, the keyboardist said they reflected that which was attracting her attention by the time (namely, Rihanna's Anti and Kanye West's The Life of Pablo).

=== Album and song titles ===
The name of the album refers to the improbability of a rock band from Natal having achieved international success. As Botarelli explains:

It has to do with our history. The fact that we play rock in Brazil, in the Northeast, in Natal. The fact that we don't like the same songs but still we manage to make it work when it's time to write songs. On the other hand, the album is everything that's in the crowdfunding campaign, which we are about to start and which will have its reasons to be 'unlikely'.

As for the tracks, which are almost all named after animals, guitarist Rafael Brasil explained that since the band compose the music before writing the lyrics, each track is given a nickname. They started to play with the songs, trying to name them after animals they felt the songs looked like and those ended up being the official names. The names were originally in Portuguese, but when they realized foreigners struggled to identify the words, they translated them all to English, except for "Coruja" ("Owl").

=== Cover ===
The album cover depicts Botarelli's feet wearing a pair of paw-shaped slippers and a pair of socks with a toast-with-jelly pattern next to an actual toast with jelly on the kitchen floor of the Airbnb they rented in Ashland. Barreto says it alludes to the album's apparent lack of sense.

=== Song information ===
Comparing Unlikely's lyrics with modeHuman's, the members believe the debut album dealt with real things, while its successor covers themes they consider to be "nice to talk about" in lyrics created in an intuitive form. Bassist Eduardo Filgueira says that "the lyrics, just like the music, are also 'unlikely' [...] There's no total connection between them. Each of them has its own vibe. We use some embromation (Note: "Embromation" is a fake English-language word invented in Brazil to express the situation in which someone attempts to speak English despite limited knowledge of the language. The word is a portmanteau of "embromar" (to beat around the bush) and the suffix "tion" and plays on the fact that many words can be translated from Portuguese and English and vice-versa by simply switching the suffixes "tion" and "ção".) words to compose, then we keep completing them and it's done".

The opening track "Cobra" was released as a single on 23 June and later received a promotional video. About choosing the song and about its video, Botarelli stated that "we find it pretty 'kicking the door open', like, 'we're here, remember us?'. We wanted it to be different from the others, we wanted it to feature chroma key, to be kinda rough, because the album has a vibe that is a little more unpretentious than the first one". The video was directed by Cléver Cardoso, who directed the videos for "Dino vs. Dino" and "About Knives", from the previous album. According to him, the original intention was to shoot it somewhere in the open, but since there was no time, they worked in studio with the band playing with images projected in the background with chroma key.

The track "Pig" was originally called "Galinha" ("Han") and it's supposed to suggest the environment of a farm near a beach. "Monkey" also received a video, in which all members (including Filgueira, who left the band prior to the video release in 2018) are standing beside each other in the snow with no appropriate clothing and depicted as if in a character selection-like screen. Meanwhile, Barreto, Botarelli and other artists like Carol Navarro (Supercombo) and Carol Caspary hang out in an arcade and chose the characters. Botarelli commented:

When the idea of making a vídeo of a competition in the snow came up, we soon thought of 'Monkey' as the soundtrack. We are from Natal, a city in which the entire population (including us) put on their coats when the temperature reaches 22 °C (72 °F). We can't stand the cold. Everybody knows that and the message is exactly this, about managing to stay. People from Natal are resilient when it comes to resisting by making art. It has to be, there's no other way. People from there make art purely for love, almost always without a revenue that could justify the effort, but they keeo on making it, they keep on resisting and we are proud that the band was born in that context and we are proud of this Rio Grande do Norte lust being so strong among all members.

"Rhino", which talks about the struggle to create the song itself, cites the verse "I will always love you", from the song of same name which was made a great hit by Whitney Houston. In the album's promotional shows, the hit is played as an intro to the show, followed by the track.

== Track listing ==
All tracks are written by Emmily Barreto, Cris Botarelli, Rafael Brasil, Edu Filgueira and Lauro Kirsch

No.	Title	Length
1.	"Cobra"	2:57
2.	"Bear"	3:18
3.	"Flamingo"	3:55
4.	"Pig"	3:49
5.	"Elephant"	4:18
6.	"Monkey"	3:42
7.	"Pelican"	3:50
8.	"Pizza"	2:28
9.	"Armadillo"	3:34
10.	"Rhino"	3:38
11.	"Slug"	5:15
12.	"Coruja" (Owl)	4:33
Total length:		45:17

== Reception ==
Professional ratings
Review scores
Source	Rating
Omelete	4/5 stars
Mauro Ferreira	4/5 stars
Mokeybuzz	3.5/5 stars
Miojo Indie	8/10 stars
Tenho Mais Discos que Amigos!	favorable

Writing for Omelete, Jacídio Junior said that "the structure shown in all tracks – growing and punchy sonority, heavy guitars and synthetic touches – takes the album to a big result and delivers a stimulating listening experience, which keeps the listener's attention all time". He pointed elements of Alanis Morissette, pop music, electronic music and Metallica's "That Was Just Your Life" in "Elephant", "Pig", "Pizza" and "Slug", respectively. He concluded his analysis saying Unlikely "is a clue that the group is walking a well-defined path, with characteristic sounds, conquering much with the attention to details and, mainly, understanding how to work diverse moments inside one single song and project (something few groups know and can do). Unlikely is an album that puts the band's will and punch in the foreground and balances this viscerality with technical care and attention".

In a non-critical article for Rolling Stone Brasil, Lucas Brêda considered that the band retained its heaviness in Unlikely "through incendiary riffs, filled drums and screaming vocals", but that the album is "more relaxed and, consequently, creative" than modeHuman, which "sounded serious and stern".

For G1's Mauro Ferreira, "basically, Unlikely sounds like a natural consequence of modeHuman. Although it can be characterized within the generic label of heavy rock, the album features nuances throughout its 12 songs. [...] The album circles with unity around the universe of electronic hard rock". He concluded by saying that "inside the sound darkness of Unlikely, Far From Alaska finds the light which will guide the quintet on paths more and more distant from Brazil".

Lucas Cassoli, from Monkeybuzz, said that "in terms of sound, we have a Far From Alaska that knew how to evince the best qualities of its arrangements and work as a team with Sylvia Massy [...] to produce the best and clearest possible sound. The tracks also stay in that middle-term between rock and pop and [...] further shorten the differences between these two genres". He also said the album "marks the rise of a Far From Alaska that is more mature and respects the traditions set by their debut album. There is a precise dose of inventiveness and a heavy investment in production, responsible for bringing out the best of each instrument".

Cleber Facchi, in his website Miojo Indie, said the album "carries in the guitars and screamed voices a series of elements that communicate with various types of public" and that it "shows the attention of the quintet in the assembling of every fragment of voice, arrangement or minimum percussive notch".

Tony Aiex, editor of the website Tenho Mais Discos que Amigos!, said "Unlikely continues from the point where the band's debut stopped, with big guitar riffs and well-structured songs, and inserts new layers of elements which result in one of the best albums of Brazilian rock in this and in the past 10 years". He praised the members' individual performances and concluded his analysis by saying that the band "got over the natural difficulties of a second album, took advantage from the experience it had in studio with a most competent producer and raised the level of the sonority it presented in the debut".

It was elected the 12th best Brazilian album of 2017 by the Brazilian edition of Rolling Stone.

== Personnel ==
- Emmily Barreto – vocals
- Cris Botarelli – synth, Lap steel guitar and vocals
- Rafael Brasil – guitar
- Edu Filgueira – bass
- Lauro Kirsch – drums
