= 2014 in Irish music =

This article lists various songs, albums, festivals, and performances of the year 2014 in Irish music.

== Albums/Songs ==
=== February ===
Heartbeat (Can-linn song) was released on February 21. It appeared at the Eurovision Song Contest 2014 in Denmark.

=== April ===
In April, Jedward's single "Free Spirit" was released

=== May ===
- Martin Tourish released Under a Red Sky Night on May 1.

=== September ===
The Coronas's fourth album will be released sometime in September.

== Performances/Festivals ==
Bold indicates that the event occurs in multiple months.

=== February ===
- Ireland in the Eurovision Song Contest 2014 took place on February 28.

=== June ===
- **Lismore Music Festival** took place on May 31 and June 1 in Lismore Castle

=== July ===
- **Live at the Marquee** will take place from June 21 to July 15.

=== August ===
- Castlepalooza will take place from August 1–3.
- Indiependence, an indie-rock festival, will take place from August 1 to 3 in Mitchelstown, County Cork.
- Electric Picnic, an arts and music festival, will take place from August 29–31.

=== September ===
Harvest Time Blues will take place from September 5 to 7 in Monaghan town.

=== October ===
- Cloughtoberfest, a gypsy jazz festival held in Cloughjordan, County Tipperary October 10 to 12.

== News ==
Emmet Cahill announced that he will be leaving Celtic Thunder in January.

== Deaths ==
- Finbarr Dwyer, accordion player, died aged 67 on February 8.
- Seán Potts, Irish musician (The Chieftains), died aged 83 on February 11.
- Paddy McGuigan, songwriter who wrote ("The Men Behind the Wire", "The Boys of the Old Brigade") and musician (The Barleycorn), died aged 74 on March 17.

== See also ==
- 2014 in music
- Music of Ireland
