= Hunting Ground =

Hunting Ground may refer to:

- The Hunting Ground, a 2015 documentary about sexual assault on college campuses
- Hunting Ground (comics), a 2001 Dark Horse Comics anthology
- Hunting Grounds, an Australian punk band
- "Hunting Ground", an episode of the U.S. television show CSI: Miami
- Hunting Ground, a 2009 fantasy novel by Patricia Briggs
