= 2014 in Asian music =

== Events ==
- February 18 – Chinese violinist Vanessa-Mae represents Thailand at the 2014 Winter Olympics in Sochi.
- September 7 – The Qatar Philharmonic Orchestra makes its Proms début. Musical director Han-na Chang resigns the following day.
- November 23 – The Grand finals of Iglesia ni Cristo's Songs of Faith, Love, & Hope: International Singing Competition are held in Philippine Arena.

== Albums ==
- 2NE1 – Crush
- 2PM – Genesis of 2PM
- AKB48 – Tsugi no Ashiato
- Babymetal – Babymetal
- Band-Maid – Maid in Japan
- BiS – Who Killed Idol?
- Buck-Tick – Arui wa Anarchy
- Jay Chou – Aiyo, Not Bad
- Crayon Pop – Uh-ee
- Donghae&Eunhyuk – Ride Me
- Girl's Day – Best Album
- Imran Mahmudul – Bolte Bolte Cholte Cholte
- Anupam Roy – Bakyobageesh
- Ringo Sheena – Gyakuyunyū: Kōwankyoku
- Super Junior – Mamacita

== Classical ==
- Unsuk Chin – Clarinet Concerto

== Opera ==
- Lei Lei – Visitors on the Icy Mountain

== Deaths ==
- January 5 – K. P. Udayabhanu, Indian playback singer, 77
- April 19 – Bashir Ahmad, Bangladeshi playback singer, 73
- May 23 – Anand Modak, Indian composer and director, 63 (heart attack)
- July 1 – Oscar Yatco, Filipino conductor and violinist, 83
- July 5 – Sharifah Aini, Malaysian veteran singer and entertainer, "Biduanita Negara" (National Songstress), 61
- September 3 – Habib Wali Mohammad, Pakistani ghazal and film playback singer, 93
- September 7 – Kwon Ri-se, Japanese/South Korean singer (Ladies' Code), 23 (injuries sustained in car accident)
- September 19 – Francisco Feliciano, Filipino composer and conductor, National Artist of the Philippines for Music, 73
- October 27 – Shin Hae-chul, South Korean singer (N.EX.T) and record producer, 46 (heart attack)
- November 26 – Sabah, Lebanese singer, 87

== See also ==
- 2014 in music
- 2014 in Japanese music
- 2014 in Philippine music
- 2014 in South Korean music
- List of 2014 albums
