= 2014 in Australian music =

The following is a list of notable events and releases that happened in 2014 in music in Australia.

== Events ==
=== January ===
- On 1 January 2014, MTV Music launched on Australian IPTV provider FetchTV.
- Big Day Out took place from January 19 through to February 2, headlined by Pearl Jam and Arcade Fire. Original co-headliners Blur, as well as DIIV, withdrew from the lineup. As of 2020, this year's festival is the most recent that has been held.
- Australia Day Live Concert took place on January 25. This year's lineup contained Lior, Matt Corby, Megan Washington, and DJ Havana Brown. It was the eleventh year that the concert took place and it was held in the Parliament House

=== February ===
- Soundwave took place in mid-February and early March. Its components included more than 50 musical acts which featured the genres of rock, metal and punk.

=== June ===
- Melbourne International Singers Festival took place from June 4 to 9 in Melbourne.
- On June 26, Big Day Out owners C3 confirmed that the 2015 edition of the festival had been cancelled, with a possible return in the future.

=== July ===
- Splendour in the Grass 2014 took place from July 25 to 27 at North Byron Parklands in Yelgun, New South Wales, headlined by Outkast, Foals (replacing former headliners Two Door Cinema Club) and Lily Allen.

=== August ===
- Shockwave Festival took place on August 2 and 3 in Blackall

== Deaths ==
- June 4 – Doc Neeson, 67, Irish-Australian singer-songwriter (The Angels)
- August 1 – Michael Johns, 35, singer
- August 8 – Peter Sculthorpe, composer

== Bands disbanded ==
- Bored Nothing
- Fire! Santa Rosa Fire!
- Hunting Grounds
- Papa Vs Pretty
- Snakadaktal

== Releases ==
=== March ===
- On March 14, Kylie Minogue released Kiss Me Once. It launched in Europe, starting on 24 September 2014 at the Echo Arena in Liverpool, England.
- Kate Miller-Heidke released "O Vertigo!" on March 14, 2014.
- Jai Waetford released Get to Know You on March 28, 2014

=== June ===
- The Veronicas released "You Ruin Me", their first single in six years.

== See also ==
- List of number-one singles of 2014 (Australia)
- List of number-one albums of 2014 (Australia)
