= Dino vs. Dino =

Single by Far from Alaska

from the album modeHuman
- Released: 8 October 2013
- Recorded: 2013 at Cantos do Trilho studio, Rio de Janeiro
- Genre: Stoner rock, alternative rock
- Length: 4:10
- Label: Deckdisc
- Songwriter(s): Cris Botarelli, Edu Filgueira, Emmily Barreto, Lauro Kirsch, Rafael Brasil

Music video
- "Dino vs. Dino" on YouTube

"Dino vs. Dino" is the debut single by Brazilian stoner rock band Far from Alaska, and the third track of their debut album modeHuman. The song received a promotional video, shot at the Dunas do Rosado Environmental Protection Area in Porto do Mangue, a municipality in the state of Rio Grande do Norte, where the group comes from. It was released on 8 October 2013, with an exclusive premiere at Tenho Mais Discos que Amigos! website.

== Composition and lyrics ==
The song was named "Dino vs. Dino" due to its introductory guitar riff, which reminds the band of the steps of a big dinosaur. The track, guitarist Rafael Brasil's favorite, had already been performed live numerous times, but in demo forms with improvised lyrics.

The song's lyrics talks about an argument one of the female members of the band had with a great friend of her. More specifically, such friend revealed a "sordid" story involving that member to other people, a story of which he also took part but tried to redeem himself. The first verse of the track shows the friend's version of the story, while the chorus shows the member's version, explaining that he is also to blame and that she didn't act like that when it was him to be the protagonist of a sordid story. According to bassist Edu Figueira, the member and that friend are already in good terms again.

== Video ==
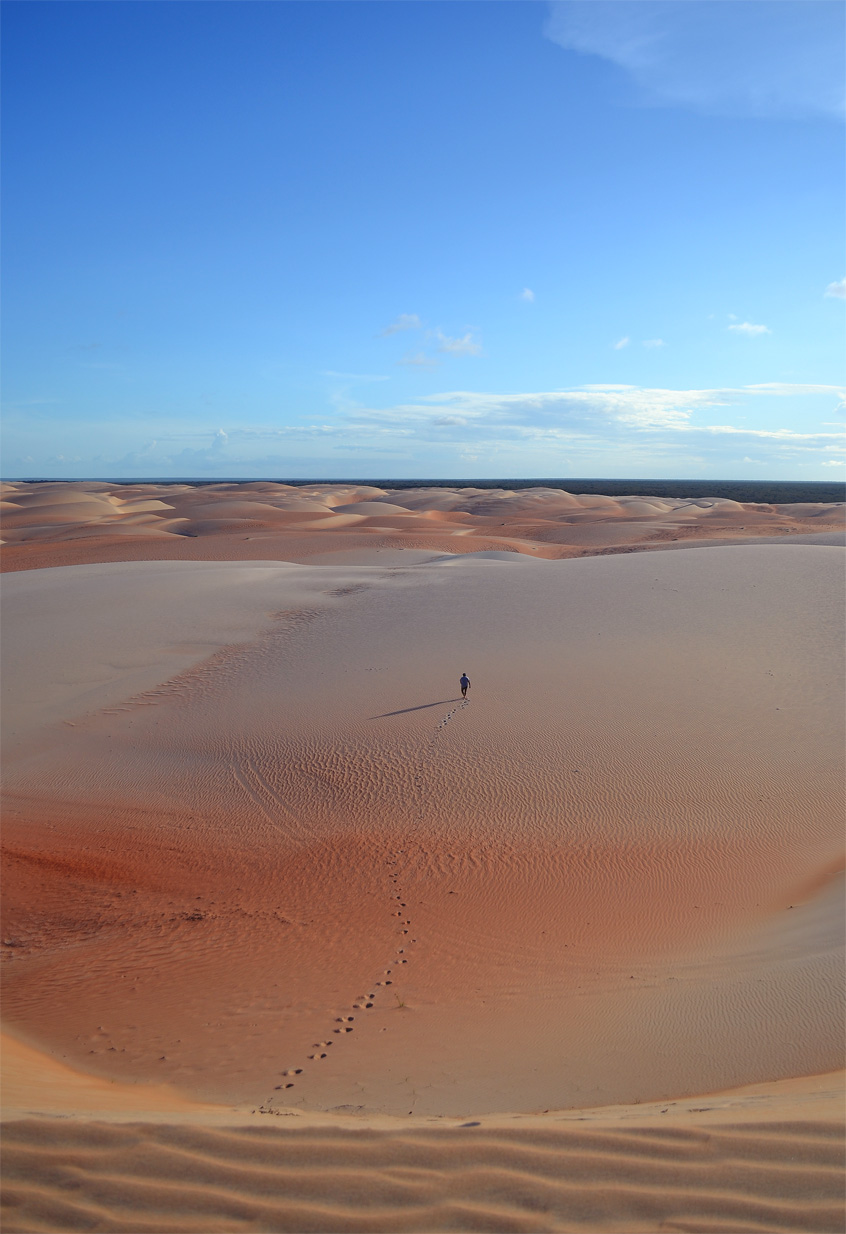
Dunas do Rosado, where the video was shot.

Originally, the band intended to release just a lyric video, but co-director Cléver Cardoso convinced Brasil to make a complete video since he considered the track "too good for just a lyric video". The project was canceled as the people involved feared it would be a failure, but it was later revived. The idea of recording the video at Dunas do Rosado, in Porto do Mangue, was to play with the band's name. Cardoso commented:

Their first video, which is great, refer to Alaska, it's cold, B&W, with snow effects. Now it had to be really far from Alaska. Desert, sun and no control of the situation. A inhospitable place.

During the shooting sessions, which lasted from 3:30 am to 6pm, the band and the Granada Filmes production team faced cars jammed in the sand, sandstorms, insolation, rain, thorn bruises from the only available tree, guitar pedals buried and lost in the sand, among other problems. Many videos of other bands performing in deserts were used as a reference, including the scene in which Slash is soloing at Guns N' Roses' "November Rain" video.
