= Far from Alaska =

Brazilian rock band

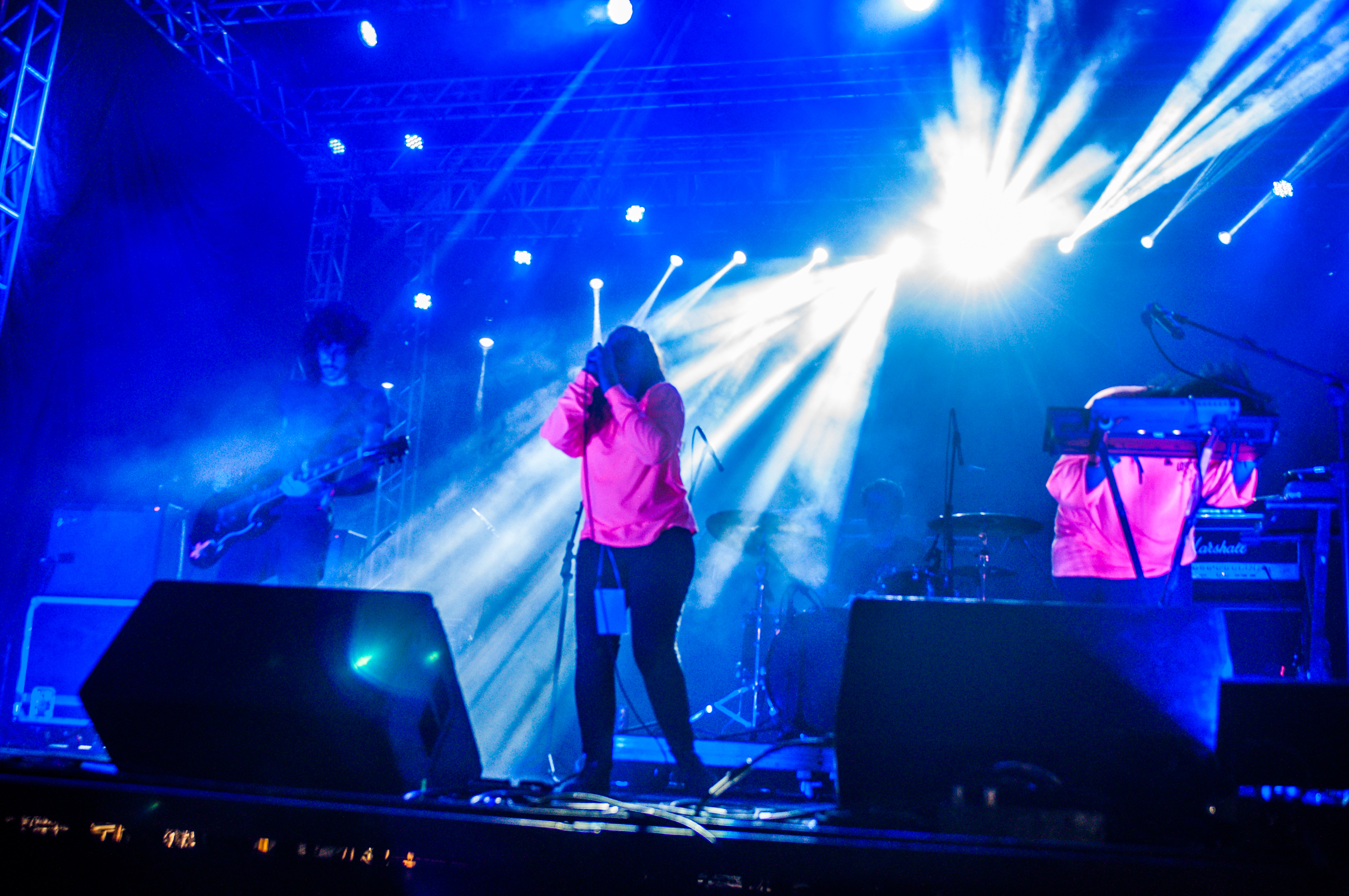
- The band in May 2017. From left to right: Rafael Brasil, Emmily Barreto, Lauro Kirsch and Cris Botarelli. Eduardo Figueira is not shown.

Background information
- Origin: Natal, Rio Grande do Norte
- Genres: Alternative rock, stoner rock
- Years active: 2012–present
- Label: Deckdisc
- Members: Emmily Barreto; Cris Botarelli; Rafael Brasil
- Past members: Edu Filgueira; Lauro Kirsch
- Website: www.farfromalaska.com

Far from Alaska is a Brazilian rock band formed in 2012 in Natal, Rio Grande do Norte, and based in São Paulo, São Paulo.

== History ==
=== Formation and first performances (2012) ===
All members lived in Natal by the time the band was formed, but only guitarist Rafael Brasil and vocalist Emmily Barreto were born there. Keyboardist Cris Botarelli is from São Paulo, bassist Edu Figueira is from Mossoró (also a Rio Grande do Norte city) and drummer Lauro Kirsch is from Cuiabá, Mato Grosso. Beside, all members have previously worked with other bands: Botarelli and Kirsch played together in a band called Planant; she also performed with Barreto in Talma & Gadelha; Brasil played in Calistoga and, together with Figueira and Kirsch, he was part of Venice.

Far from Alaska was formed in 2012, initially as a project of Cris and Emmily for the latter to sing. They called the other three members and considered the band a side project only. In that same year, they won the contest "Som Para Todos", which granted them a distribution contract with Deckdisc and the right to perform at Planeta Terra Festival in São Paulo. That was their second live performance ever, after which they had the chance of speaking to Shirley Manson, vocalist of Garbage, who complimented them two months later.

According to keyboardist Cris Botarelli, the band's name does not mean anything special; it was a mere suggestion of vocalist Emmily Barreto's mother that ended up pleasing the band members after they failed to reach an agreement. At the same occasion, she also explained that the band don't see a problem at writing English lyrics since the public from Rio Grande do Norte (the band's home state) has been receiving it well. In another interview, Botarelli also said that singing in English was a natural decision given that the vast majority of the bands they listen to have English lyrics.

=== First works: Stereochrome and modeHuman (2012–2014) ===
In October 2012, the band released their first EP, Stereochrome, with four tracks. It was pre-produced in Natal, recorded at Estúdio Tambor in Rio de Janeiro with Pedro Garcia as the producer and mixed by Chris Hanzsek at Hanzsek Audio in Seattle, United States. In May 2014, it was released their first album by Deckdisc, modeHuman, containing 15 tracks including re-recorded versions of the EP's four songs. One of the tracks, "Dino vs. Dino", was released as a single and received a video recorded at Dunas do Rosado, a protected desert area in Porto do Mangue, 500 km from Natal. A second video was planned for a 2014 release. The track "Thievery" also received a promotional video, and a video for "About Knives" was released in 2015.

In 2014, they played at the FIFA Fan Fest event in Natal, during the 2014 FIFA World Cup.

=== Moving to São Paulo and Lollapalooza (2014–2016) ===
By the end of 2014, Figueira said in an interview that the band was going to move to São Paulo for logistical reasons and in order to generate more opportunities. By January 2015, part of the band had already settled in São Paulo.

In 2014, they were announced as part of the line-up of the 2015 Lollapalooza Brasil. Their performance at the festival was well received by the critics.

On 12 March 2015, they announced a new song titled "Relentless Game", co-written and co-recorded with Brasília band Scalene. In the next year, the song would be featured in the soundtrack of Rede Globo's telenovela Rock Story. As of July 2015, some members still kept second jobs aside from music: Brasil was an art director at an agency and Botarelli was a lawyer. Figueira graduated in two universities (including a degree in Architecture), but by that time he was already living out of music only. In August 2017, by the time of the release of their sophomore album, all members were already giving total dedication to music.

In February 2016, they released another new song called "Chills", and also announced plans for a new album for that year.

In March 2016, the band performed at the SXSW festival in Texas, United States.

=== Unlikely and Download Festival (2017–present) ===
In the beginning of 2017, they released "Collision Course", a collaborative song with Ego Kill Talent. In the same month, they traveled to the United States where they are expected to work on their second album, to be produced by Sylvia Massy. In February, they revealed the album title, Unlikely, and announced a crowdfunding campaign at Kickante to finance the album. Also in February, they were announced as part of the line up of the French edition of Download Festival. Their performance took place on 10 June, on the same day as bands like System of a Down, Five Finger Death Punch, Slayer and Alter Bridge.

In June, they released Unlikely's first single, "Cobra".

== Awards ==
In 2012 the band won the contest "Som Para Todos", which included a concert at the Planeta Terra Festival in São Paulo and a distribution contract with Deckdisc.

The band's debut album, modeHuman, and the track Politks won the Hangar award for the best album and track of the year.

In June 2016, the band won the International Midem Award for the "We are the future" category (for new artists).

== Discography ==
=== Albums ===
- modeHuman (2014)
- Unlikely (2017)

=== EPs ===
- Stereochrome (EP) (2012)

=== Singles ===
- "Dino vs. Dino" (2013)
- "Relentless Game (feat. Scalene)" (2015)
- "Chills" (2016)
- "Collision Course (feat. Ego Kill Talent)" (2017)
- "Cobra" (2017)

== Members ==
- Emmily Barreto - vocals
- Cris Botarelli - synth, lap steel, bass, vocals
- Rafael Brasil - guitars

=== Ex-Members ===
- Lauro Kirsch - drums
- Edu Filgueira - bass
