= ModeHuman =

modeHuman

Studio album by Far from Alaska
- Released: May 13, 2014
- Genres: Alternative Rock, stoner rock
- Length: 61:01
- Label: Deckdisc
- Producer: Pedro Garcia

Far from Alaska chronology
Stereochrome (2012)	modeHuman (2014)	Unlikely (2017)

Singles from modeHuman
- 1. "Thievery" Released: July 24, 2013; 2. "Dino vs Dino" Released: October 8, 2013; 3. "About Knives" Released: March 23, 2015

modeHuman is the debut studio album by Brazilian rock band Far from Alaska, released on May 13, 2014 in Brazil. The album was recorded at the Tambor studio in Rio de Janeiro and produced by Pedro Garcia, former drummer of the rap rock musical group Planet Hemp. It was mastered in Seattle by Chris Hanzsek, who has previously worked with Soundgarden, Melvins and Skin Yard.

== Concept and composing ==
According to the cover art creator Alexandre Wake, the album "works with the concept of robotics through the humanization of the machine and human learning through music". According to keyboardist Cris Botarelli, the figure depicted at the cover art is a "roboa" – a Portuguese way of indicating that it is a female robot, though there isn't really such word in Portuguese and robots are always treated as male objects – that just arrived on Earth and whose mission is to replace a human being in society. To do so, it'll be required to learn "many people's nuances, their relationships, their sentimental connections and all those things that make us more than a whole lot of logical equations and numbers" The album tracks create a kind of a "manual of perspectives for this robot to assimilate". Musically speaking, Botarelli said she couldn't explain much. "It's this craziness you see there, [...] heavy guitars, crazy little keyboards, bass with synth."

The picture was taken in Pipa Beach and the model is a friend of the members, using clothes borrowed from vocalist Emmily Barreto or Botarelli. Wake then completed the image with the structures covering her bust and hands.

The album was originally planned to feature new material only. However, during the recording sessions, the band decided to include re-recorded versions of the four tracks from their previous EP Stereochrome, since they realized the songs were part of the moment of creation of the band and its identity, and also because they felt the lyrics matched the overall theme of the album.

modeHuman is mainly influenced by grunge, stoner rock and garage rock artists such as Nirvana, Queens of the Stone Age and Jack White.

== Song information ==
"Thievery" was chosen as the opening track for being the band's first composition. The lyrics deal with jealousy and the band consider its riff to be the best they ever created. The track received a promotional video. "Deadman" talks about reaching the rock bottom and getting over it. The song was composed in various steps, eventually reaching its final, dense form. At 2:13, drummer Lauro Kirsch can be heard speaking German about speaking German. "Another Round", Kirsch's favorite, covers a similar topic: surpassing and persistence. "Politiks" was the track composed in the shortest time, during a car trip to a band's meeting. The lap steel riff by Botarelli was the first time she ever played the instrument. By the end of the track, Brasil uses a vocoder, even though he is not an English speaker. The lyrics cover the topic of "graft, usage of influence to subdue a person and restrict their freedom, in any aspect". The track was awarded as the "Best Song of the Year" by Prêmio Hangar de Música.

"About Knives" was considered by Botarelli as a summary of the album. It was the third track of the album to receive a promotional video, with images shot in Argentina, Chile, Brazil, England and India. The track's epigraph comes from the poem "O homem, as viagens" (The man, the trips), by Carlos Drummond de Andrade. "Rolling Dice" talks about one hesitating to do the right or wrong thing when it's not what they want to do. It received a lyric video. "Mama" was the second composition by the band and talks about "growing up and finding themselves in a World that's quite different from the comics, a common conflict at the end of adolescence". "Greyhound", named after an English dog breed notorious for its speed talks about "human greyhounds", people that carry on with their lives the way they want and regardless of social pressures. It was composed before the release of Stereochrome and almost made it to the track list.

"Communication" is the only track that was not completely created by the band. It was co-written by Botarelli and a friend of the band, Henrique Geladeira. Together, they formed a nightclub band that only did covers and had just two original works. "Communication" was one of them. The version recorded for modeHuman is different from the original one, with its lyrics now expressing how the lack of communication can lead to a relationship's end. "The New Heal" was the third composition by the band and is one of the tracks coming from Stereochrome. The chorus was changed for the album version.

"Tiny Eyes" tells the story of a bird being rescued, with the bird being a metaphor for a person who swallows their pride and accept external help. "modeHuman, Pt.1" is the explanation of the album's concept, speaking of a person that will be replaced by a robot that must learn about human relations. "Rainbows" talks about homosexuality and was the last song to be finished. "Monochrome", the ending track, tells the story of a person that "got tired of fighting against their own nature and accepted the fact that we have control of nothing and that no matter what they do, problems will come up regardless of how much you protect yourself". At 6:29, there is a hidden track, "modeHuman, Pt. 2", which starts full of electronic sounds and slowly grows cleaner and starts demonstrating inconsistencies in its tempo, symbolizing a mechanical robot turning into an organic and imperfect creature – fulfilling "roboa's" mission.

== Track listing ==
No.	Title	Length
1.	"Thievery"	4:02
2.	"Deadmen"	3:08
3.	"Dino vs. Dino"	4:10
4.	"Politiks"	3:54
5.	"Another Round"	4:00
6.	"About Knives"	3:49
7.	"Rolling Dice"	2:56
8.	"Mama"	3:48
9.	"Greyhound"	3:32
10.	"Communication"	3:33
11.	"The New Heal"	4:50
12.	"Tiny Eyes"	4:09
13.	"modeHuman, Pt. 1"	1:38
14.	"Rainbows"	4:17
15.	"Monochrome" (contains the hidden track "modeHuman, Pt. 2" at 6:29)	9:22

== Personnel ==
- Emmily Barreto – vocals
- Cris Botarelli – synthesizer, lap steel guitar and vocals
- Rafael Brasil – guitar, vocoder on "Politiks"
- Edu Filgueira – bass and backing vocals
- Lauro Kirsch – drums, spoken words on "Deadman"
