= Anker Buch =

Danish violinist

Anker Buch (25 March 1940 – 1 April 2014) was a Danish violinist. He was born in Vejgaard. He gained international recognition and played more than 7,000 concerts in most parts of the world.

When Buch was 10 years old, he made his debut as a soloist at the Odd Fellow Palace in Aalborg.

Buch died on 1 April 2014 surrounded by his family members, aged 74.
