= Vykintas Baltakas =

Lithuanian composer

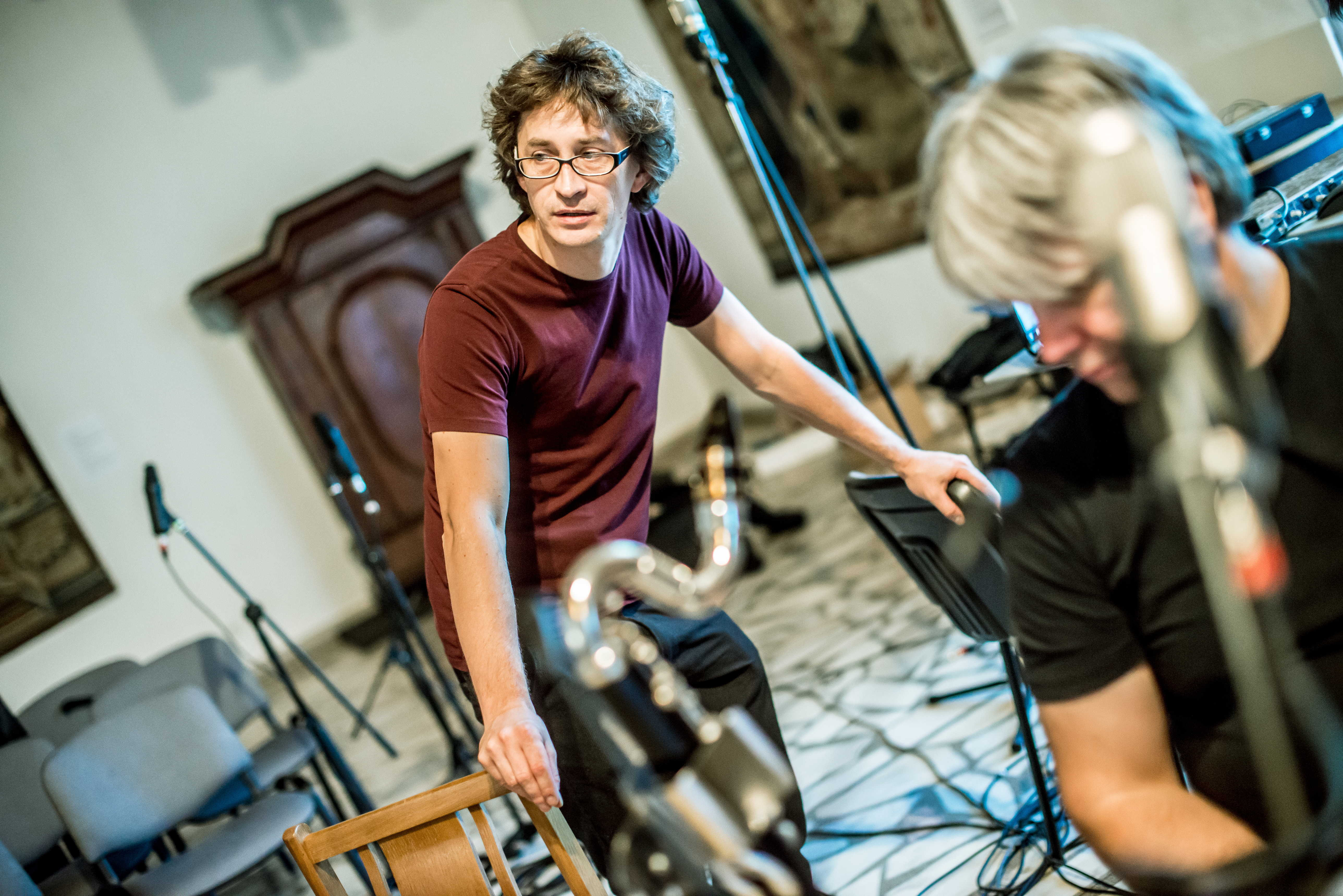
- Born: July 10, 1972 (age 54); Vilnius, Lithuania
- Occupation: composer - conductor - educator
- Years active: 1989–present
- Website: https://www.baltakas.net/

Vykintas Baltakas (born July 10, 1972, in Vilnius, Lithuania) is a Lithuanian composer and conductor known for his contributions to contemporary classical music.

== Education and early career ==
Baltakas studied at the Vilnius Music Academy from 1990 to 1993 under Vytautas Barkauskas. In 1993, he moved to Karlsruhe, Germany, to study composition with Wolfgang Rihm and conducting with Andreas Weiss at the Hochschule für Musik Karlsruhe. Between 1994 and 1997, he also studied at the International Eötvös Institute under Peter Eötvös. In 1997, Baltakas continued his studies in Paris at the Conservatoire National Supérieur and later attended IRCAM's composition and computer music course from 1999 to 2000.

== Professional career ==
Vykintas Baltakas is active in contemporary music, participating in festivals and collaborating with various European ensembles. His works have been commissioned by institutions such as the WDR Symphony Orchestra, the Munich Biennale, the Wiener Festwochen/Klangforum Wien, the Ensemble Modern, the Bavarian Radio Symphony Orchestra/musica viva, the Venice Biennale, the Queen Elisabeth Competition of Belgium, and Maerz Musik Berlin.

His compositions have been performed and premiered by ensembles and musicians including the Arditti Quartet, Les Percussions de Strasbourg, Teodoro Anzellotti, Marcus Weiss, and Benjamin Kobler.

As a conductor, Baltakas has worked with ensembles and orchestras such as the Bavarian Radio Symphony Orchestra, Deutsches Symphonie-Orchester Berlin, Rundfunk-Sinfonieorchester Berlin, Ensemble Modern, and Klangforum Wien. In 2009, he founded the Lithuanian Ensemble Network (LEN), aiming to promote contemporary music in Lithuania.

In 2009, he founded LENsemble Vilnius (Lithuanian Ensemble Network), which brings together ensembles, soloists, and conductors focused on contemporary music.

Baltakas has contributed to several recordings, including two portrait albums released by Kairos Music: b(ell tree) and Ouroboros.

== Compositions ==
Solo

- Pažeistas šešėlis (1993) for soprano and marimba (or tape)
- Pasaka (1995-97) for piano and electronics
- Pasaka (1995-97) for piano solo
- Nr. 2 (1999) for versions for piccolo, clarinet, accordion
- das Lied (2000-2001) for piano and electronics
- (how does the silver cloud s)ou(nd?) (2006) for piano solo
- ri (2007) for soprano and electronics
- Eine kleine Nachtmusik (2013) for violin
- Music of falling sounds (2015) for violin and electronics
- Incantatio (2019) for soprano
- Cladi I (2020) for accordion
- Canon perpetuus super Thema Regium (dead end) (2021) for harpsichord
- Cladi IV (2022) for accordion

Chamber Works

- Unvollendete. (1994) for flute, trumpet, and alto sax or flute, trumpet, and alto sax (version 1994)
- RiRo (1995-99) for soprano and trumpet
- Nichtstück (1996):
  1. Piccolo trumpet, two trumpets, bass trumpet
  2. Clarinet (Eb), soprano saxophone, trumpet, alto saxophone
- Unvollendete (1999) for flute, trumpet, bass clarinet (version 1999)
- b(ell tree) (2007) for string quartet (two violins, viola, and cello)
- Commentum (2011) for cello, piano
- Redditio 2 (2013) for woodwind quintet
- Recitativo (2014) for violin, piano
- Saxopho(e)nix (2014) for soprano saxophone (Bb), alto saxophone (Eb), baritone saxophone (Eb) or tenor saxophone (Bb)
- Smokey Arnold (2015) for flute, clarinet, piano, violin, cello
- Sandwriting (2018) for two electric keyboards & computer
- Spicules (2023) for 4 marimbas

Ensemble Works

- mintis-atsakas-aidas (1993) for brass ensemble
- Sinfonia (1996) for wind ensemble
- Pūslinė (1997-2000) for mixed ensemble
- Nr. 1 / 3 (1998-2003) for mixed ensemble
- about to drink dense clouds (2003) for narrator, ensemble, and electronics
- Ouroboros (2004) for ensemble
- Ouroboros - Zyklus (2004-2005) for soprano, ensemble, and electronics
- (co)ro(na) (2005) for ensemble
- Lift to Dubai (2009) for ensemble and electronics
- Redditio (2010) for ensemble
- Eselsbrücke (2013) for ensemble
- Neon Sea (2019) for flute/piccolo, clarinet, violin, viola, cello, and electronics
- Cladi II (2021) for ensemble
- Cladi III (2021) for ensemble and electronics

Orchestra Works

- Poussla (2002 / 2006) for symphonic orchestra
- Scoria (2010) for symphonic orchestra
- Saxordionphonics (2013) for solo saxophone, accordion, and symphonic orchestra
- Commentum (2016) for cello and string orchestra
- Sandwriting II (2019) for symphonic orchestra
- Spicules II (2023) for cello and string orchestra
- Cumulus (2024) for symphonic wind orchestra

Stage Works

- Cantio (2004) for narrator(s), soprano, tenor, bass-baritone, chamber orchestra, and electronics

== Audio production ==
Vykintas Baltakas's works have been recorded and released by several music labels. These labels include:

- Kairos Music: Released the album b(ell tree) in 2016, featuring compositions such as "(co)ro(na)" and "Pasaka".
- Neos: Released the album Vykintas Baltakas: Redditio in 2018, featuring compositions like "Redditio" and "Ri."
- Fuga Libera: Released the album Vykintas Baltakas: Ouroboros in 2020, featuring compositions like "Lift to Dubai" and "Ouroboros".

== Publishers ==
Vykintas Baltakas's compositions are published by Universal Edition Wien, Composers Edition London, and Aust-Musik-Verlag.

== Curatorship ==
- Since 2009: Founder and Artistic Director of LENsemble Vilnius (Lithuanian Ensemble Network).
- Since 2015: Co-Curator of contemporary music activities at the Kintai Festival.
- Since 2021: Curator of a contemporary music series at NoBusiness Records.
- Since 2023: Co-Curator of the festival/workshop contemPLAY (in collaboration with Mantautas Krukauskas and Liudas Mockūnas).

== Awards and recognition ==
Baltakas has received several awards for his work in composition and conducting, including:

- Prize at the conductors' course Extreme in Mürzzuschlag (1993)
- Stipendiumpreis of the Darmstadt International Summer Course for New Music for Pasaka (1996)
- Composition Prize for Pasaka for piano and tape at the Concours International de Piano XXème siècle d'Orléans (2002)
- Second Prize at the Bad-Homburger Conductors' Competition (2002)
- International Composition Award Claudio Abbado (2003)
- Award "Best Lithuanian Music-theater piece in 2004" for Cantio (2005)
- Ernst von Siemens Grants-in-aid Prize (2007)

== Academic roles ==
Baltakas has held academic positions at various institutions:

- 2015–2017: Guest Professor at the Royal Conservatory of Brussels.
- From 2015: Professor of Composition at the Conservatory of Maastricht.
- 2016: Co-initiated a master's program in contemporary music performance at the Lithuanian Academy of Music and Theatre in Vilnius, in collaboration with Liudas Mockūnas.
- From 2019: Professor at the Lithuanian Academy of Music and Theatre.
- 2008–2024: Guest Lecturer at esteemed institutions, including:
  - Internationale Ferienkurse für Neue Musik Darmstadt (Darmstadt New Music Summer Courses)
  - The University of Haifa
  - Matrix Academy of SWR Freiburg
  - Royal Academy of Music London
  - Hochschule für Musik Carl Maria von Weber Dresden
