= Jagoda Szmytka =

Polish composer (born 1982)

- Born: 15 January 1982 (age 44); Legnica, Poland
- Notable work: Dla głosów i rąk
- Website: jagodaszmytka.com/jagoda_szmytka.html

Jagoda Marta Szmytka (born 15 January 1982, Legnica) is a Polish composer. She has attracted attention for her style of music, which uses elements not only of sound, but also of the sense of space and visual arts, and also for her opera, Dla głosów i rąk (For Voices and Hands). She is a well-known composer in Europe and has been recognized abroad, winning numerous juried scholarships, including the Staubach Honoraria for Composition.

== Biography ==
Jagoda Szmytka studied history of art and philosophy at the University of Wrocław, Poland (2000-2005) as well as composition and music theory with Krystian Kiełb and Cezary Duchnowski at the Karol Lipiński Academy of Music in Wrocław. This was followed by postgraduate studies in composition with Pierluigi Billone and Beat Furrer at the University of Music and Performing Arts Graz (2007-2008), with Beat Furrer at the Frankfurt University of Music and Performing Arts (2008-2010), and with Wolfgang Rihm at the Karlsruhe University of Music (2010-2012).

Szmytka has received numerous scholarships and grants from various foundations including Austrian Agency for International Cooperation in Education and Research (ÖAD) (2008), an artist grant funded by the Polish Ministry of Culture and National Heritage (2008), German Academic Exchange Service (DAAD) (2008/09), a scholarship of the Oscar und Vera Ritter Stiftung (2010), a scholarship from the Baden-Württemberg Art Foundation (2011), Alfred Toepfer Stiftung (2011), the Wolfgang Rihm Scholarship of the Hoepfner Foundation (2011), and the Staubach Honorarium for Composition by the Darmstadt Summer Courses (2012).

In both 2011 and 2014 she was composer-in-residence at ZKM Karlsruhe, which in between those appointments she had served as composer-in-residence at La Muse en circuit Paris. She was awarded with the Villa Serpentara Scholarship 2017 by the Academy of Arts, Berlin.

Szmytka lives as a freelance composer in Frankfurt am Main. She founded an artist's and musician's group called "Play" which meets biweekly and performs once a month.

== Work ==
Szmytka's work uses sound and also includes visual elements such as text, theatre and painting.

The work on her release, "Bloody Cherries", was performed mainly by Ensemble Garage, and was considered to be sensual and gestural by Polityka.

Szmytka’s compositions are featured at international festivals and institutions including Warsaw Autumn, where she premiered "Lost." Her work has been performed at the Lucerne Festival, Festival Ultraschall Berlin, Wien Modern, Eclat-Festival Stuttgart, Darmstadt International Summer Courses for New Music, Musica Polonica Nova, Rheinsberger Musiktage, Deutschlandfunk Cologne, ZKM Center for Art and Media Karlsruhe, Polish National Opera Warsaw. Ensembles performing her works include Ensemble Garage, Ensemble Interface, ensemble recherche, European Workshop for Contemporary Music, IEMA, E-MEX Ensemble, Duo leise dröhnung, Kwartludum, Ensemble l'arsenale, Ensemble Besides.

== Works ==
=== Solo music ===
- körperwelten for amplified string instrument, audio, videon [1 player] (2008)
- ¿i? study of who where when for harpsichord or prepared piano, audio, video [1 player] (2008)
- Open the box! #1 for accordion solo (2010)
- Open the box! #2 for organ solo (2011)
- GAMEBOY for sampler, audi, video [1 player] (2014)

=== Chamber music ===
- per ._o for 2 flutists and 1 pianist or percussionist (2008)
- for[UN]fall for amplified clarinet/bass clarinet, violin, piano, percussion, audio files (2009/11)
- Just before after #1 for ensemble (flute, clarinet, violin, cello, piano, percussion), optional: amplification (2010)
- Just before after #2 for amplified ensemble (flute, clarinet, violin, viola, cello, double bass, harp, percussion) (2010)
- Watch out! of the box [as Luis B. says] for amplified cello, piano, audio, video [2 players] (2011)
- electrified memories of bloody cherries. extended Landschaft von Musik for amplified ensemble (2011)
- hand saw WeltAll-Stars. generously for amplified ensemble (flute, violin, viola, cello, double bass, piano) (2011)
- sky-me type-me for four voices amplified with megaphones (2011)
- f* for music for E-guitar, amplified cello (2012)
- for travellers like angels or vampires for amplified ensemble (2012)
- Oh no, I've lost my lofty bow for amplified ensemble (2012)
- greetings from a doppelgänger for amplified ensemble (violin, viola, cello, piano, percussion) and transducers (2013)
- Inane prattle for amplified ensemble (flute, oboe, clarinet, bassoon, trumpet, violin, viola, cello, double bass), audio files (2013)
- pores open wide shut for flute, cello, piano, percussion (2013)
- empty music for amplified ensemble (clarinet, viola, cello, prepared piano, percussion) (2014)
- Limbo Lander. Audiovisual context composition for flute, clarinet, violin, cello, piano, percussion, video, audio (2014)

=== Works for ensemble ===
- verb(a)renne Life! for ensemble (fl, ob, cl, bsn, hn, tr, trombones, 2x perc, 2x violins, violas, vc, db), 4 megaphones (2009)
- happy deaf people. Staged piece for amplified cello, large ensemble, video and audio projections (2012)

=== Stage works ===
- dla głosów i rąk [for hands and voices]. Chamber opera for soprano, 7 singers, ensemble, audio and video projections (2013)

== Discography ==
- „Jagoda Szmytka – bloody cherries: electrified memories of bloody cherries / for travelers like angels or vampires / hand saw WeltAll-Stars. generously / sky-me, type-me / pores open wide shut / f* for music / greetings from a doppelgänger“ WERGO 2014 (WER 64142)
