= 2014 in Philippine music =

The following is a list of notable events that are related to Philippine music in 2014.

== Events ==
=== January ===
- January 15: Filipino caregiver Rose Fostanes from Taguig wins the inaugural season of The X Factor Israel, after performing "My Way".

=== February ===
- February 14: The revived local version of MTV in the country, MTV Pinoy was relaunched. Sam Pinto, Andre Paras, singer Josh Padilla, and Yassi Pressman were also introduced as the channel's VJs.

=== March ===
- March 19: President Benigno Aquino III led the opening of the first Pinoy Music Summit organized by Organisasyon ng mga Pilipinong Mang-aawit (OPM), Filipino Society of Composers, Authors and Publishers, Inc. (FILSCAP), Philippine Association of Recording Industry (PARI), Assosasyon ng Musikong Pilipino Foundation Inc. (AMP), Music Copyright Administrators of the Philippines (MCAP) and PHILPOP Foundation at the Landbank Plaza in Manila. Aquino III said in his speech that he will continue to support the Original Pilipino Music (OPM) industry through the implementation of the Executive Order 255 by former President Corazon Aquino that orders local radio stations to air at least four OPM songs per hour.
- March 20: The 12 finalists for the year's Philippine Popular Music Festival were announced.
- March 26: The music video of "Magda", a collaboration song of Gloc 9 and Rico Blanco was awarded Favorite Music Video at the Myx Music Awards 2014 held at the Samsung Hall of SM Aura Premier. Sarah Geronimo was named Favorite Artist of the Year. Parokya ni Edgar, who celebrated their 20th anniversary in the local music scene, was this year's Myx Magna Awardee.

=== April ===
- April 8:
  - The finals of the 2014 myx VJ Search was held at the Alphonse Bistro in Pasig. Singer Luigi D' Avola, fresh graduate Vieo Lopez and former Magic 89.9 radio jockey Gianna Llanes were the newest VJs of myx.
  - Spotify, a free music streaming website and smartphone app based in Sweden, launched for Philippine online and mobile users.

=== May ===
- May 1: Rocky Rosabal, a service crew member from a McDonald's branch in Cagayan de Oro, was proclaimed as the 1st runner-up of the fifth season of the Voice of Mcdonald's held at Orlando, Florida.
- May 8: Music Deserves Respect (MDR) Live, was the first silent and less-noised concert in Philippine music industry using Sony's newest headphones featuring Ely Buendia and Bamboo Mañalac. It was held at the Rockwell Tent in Makati.
- May 27: Sarah Geronimo were among the acts that won accolades in the 2014 World Music Awards held in Monaco, winning the Best Selling Philippines Artist award. Geronimo is the first Filipino music artist to receive an award in World Music Awards history.

=== June ===
- June 23: The 15 finalists for the year's Himig Handog P-Pop Love Songs were announced.

=== July ===
- July 11: 1st MOR Pinoy Music Awards, held at the SM Mall of Asia Arena in Pasay, coincides with the first anniversary of MOR 101.9 For Life!.
- July 26: The 3rd Philippine Popular Music Festival was held in which "Salbabida" won the Grand Prize. It was composed by Jungee Marcelo and interpreted by Kyla.
- July 27: Lyca Gairanod, coached by Sarah Geronimo, won the inaugural season of The Voice Kids at the Resorts World Manila.

=== September ===
- September 23: "May Awa ang Dios", composed by Louise Lyle Robles and interpreted by Beverly Caimen was crowned as the winning entry in the 2014 A Song of Praise Music Festival Finals Night held in the Smart Araneta Coliseum.
- September 28: "Mahal Ko O Mahal Ako", composed by Edwin Marollano and interpreted by KZ Tandingan was proclaimed as Grand Winner in the 2014 Himig Handog P-Pop Love Songs Finals Night held in the Smart Araneta Coliseum.

=== November ===
- November 23: Brother Zachary Dominguez who represented Asia won the Binhi category, Sister Cris Ann Julique Fabilona who represented the Philippines won the KADIWA category, Sister Loryza Francisco who represented Europe won the Buklod category and Brother Dean Angelina who represented the Philippines won the CWS or PNK category in the Grand finals night of Iglesia ni Cristo's Songs of Faith, Love, & Hope: International Singing Competition held in Philippine Arena.
- November 30: Star Music releases Jamie Rivera's "We Are All God's Children", the official theme song for Pope Francis' apostolic visit to the Philippines in January 2015.

=== December ===
- December 16: Herbert Colangco, one of the New Bilibid Prison's inmate whose cell was raided by authorities on Monday, shot a music video inside his luxurious quarters in the jail facility.

== Debuts ==
=== Soloist ===
- Myk Perez
- Paolo Onesa
- Janice Javier
- Klarisse de Guzman
- Herbert C.
- Maja Salvador
- Rose Fostanes
- Azrah
- Kylie Padilla
- Hannah Nolasco
- Enchong Dee

=== Bands/groups ===
- Iktus
- Batchmates
- Blaze N Kane
- Generation

== Disbandment ==
- Baywalk Bodies

== Albums released ==
The following albums are released in 2014 locally. Note: All soundtracks are not included in this list.

Date released	Title	Artist(s)	Label(s)	Source
January 1	Stories	Johnny Alegre Affinity	MCA Music	
January 6	Bangon Pilipinas: Volume 5	Various Artists	IndiePinoy	
January 15	Tres Marias	Tres Marias	Curve Entertainment	
January 15	Bangon Kaibigan	Various Artists	GMA Records	
January 24	Acoustic Noel	Noel Cabangon	Universal Records	
January 31	My Acoustic	Myk Perez	MCA Music	
January 31	Ultrablessed	Sponge Cola	Universal Records	
February 9	XL2	Xian Lim	Star Music	
February 11	With You	Gary Valenciano	Universal Records	
February 13	Kinabukasan	Herbert C.	Ivory Music & Video	
February 14	Electrified	MYMP	PolyEast Records	
February 14	Pop Goes Standards	Paolo Onesa	MCA Music	
February 15	Take a Chance	Luigi D'Avola	Mecca Music	
February 21	Iktus	Iktus	MCA Music	
March 1	Acoustic Princess OPM	Princess Velasco	Vicor Music	
March 6	Believe	Maja Salvador	Ivory Music & Video	
March 6	Renzo Vergara	Renzo Vergara	Star Music	
March 8	'Di Ko Makontrol	The Moonflowers	Pineapple Riddims Recording	
March 8	Fine as Wine Instrumentals	RJ Jacinto	RJ Productions	
March 14	JC Regino	JC Regino	MCA Music	
April 3	Samu't-Sari	Johnoy Danao	Universal Records	
April 6	I Heart You	Daniel Padilla	Star Music	
April 12	The Nightingale Returns	Lani Misalucha	Star Music	
April 14	James Wright	James Wright	ETalent Inc., GMA Records	
April 18	Janice Javier	Janice Javier	MCA Music	
April 28	#KalyePop [KPop]	1:43	MCA Music	
April 28	Journey	Kyla	PolyEast Records	
May 5	Batchmates	Batchmates	PolyEast Records	
May 17	The Promise	Raymond Lauchengco	Viva Records	
May 20	Celestine	Toni Gonzaga	Star Music	
May 31	Seasons	Kylie Padilla	GMA Records	
June 1	Deeper	Julie Anne San Jose	GMA Records	
June 2	Klarisse de Guzman	Klarisse de Guzman	MCA Music	
June 8	My Way	Rose Fostanes	Star Music	
June 20	Dream	Azrah	PolyEast Records	
July 1	be/ep	B.P. Valenzuela	Independent	
July 18	Decades of OPM	ABS-CBN Philharmonic Orchestra	Star Music	
July 23	Generation	Generation	Star Music	
August 1	Hanggang Wakas	Mitoy Yonting	MCA Music	
August 4	Silence/Noise	Paolo Valenciano	Star Music	
August 20	Kakaibabe	Donnalyn Bartolome	Viva Records	
August 20	Nadine Lustre	Nadine Lustre	Viva Records	
September 12	Radical Love	Victory Worship	Every Nation Music	
September 15	The Crooner Sings Bacharach	Richard Poon	Universal Records	
September 20	The Ransom Collective	The Ransom Collective	Independent	
September 28	Enchong Dee	Enchong Dee	Star Music	
October 4	Perfectly Imperfect	Sarah Geronimo	Viva Records	
October 4	Never Alone	Jennylyn Mercado	GMA Records	
October 10	My New Heart	Barbie Almalbis	MCA Music	
October 22	Edward Benosa	Edward Benosa	Star Music	
October 30	All About Love	Yeng Constantino	Star Music	
November 6	Gimme 5	Gimme 5	Star Music	
November 7	Soundtrack	Christian Bautista	Universal Records	
November 26	Kathryn	Kathryn Bernardo	Star Music	
December 1	Throwback: Ang Songbuk Ng Apo	Noel Cabangon	Universal Records	
December 10	Darren	Darren Espanto	MCA Music	
December 12	#Trending	Vice Ganda	Star Music	

== Awards ==
- March 26: Myx Music Awards 2014, organized by myx
- June 11: 2014 Urban Music Awards, organized by Wave 89.1
- July 11: 1st MOR Pinoy Music Awards organized by MOR 101.9
- September 14: 6th Star Awards for Music, organized by Philippine Movie Press Club
- December 12: 27th Awit Awards, organized by the Philippine Association of the Record Industry

== Concerts and music festivals ==
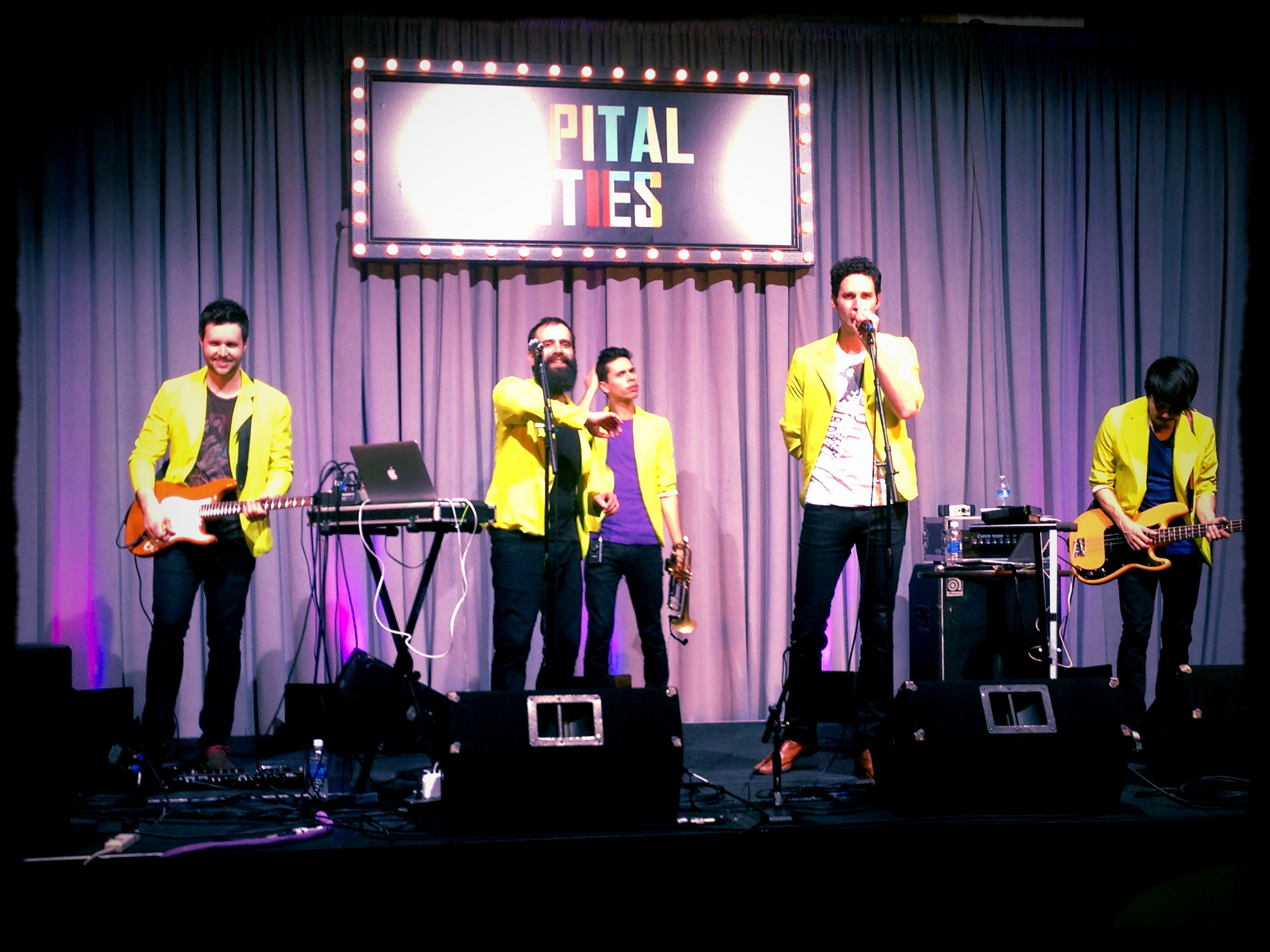
American Indie pop duo, Capital Cities.

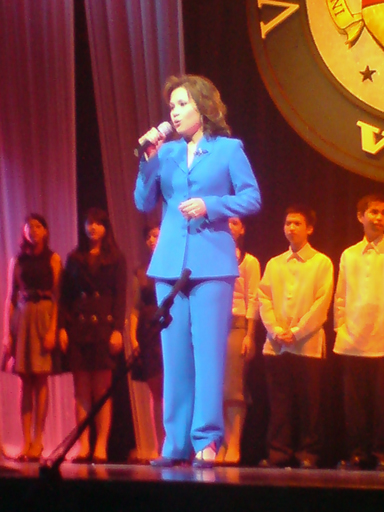
Lea Salonga, a world-renowned Filipina broadway actress and singer.

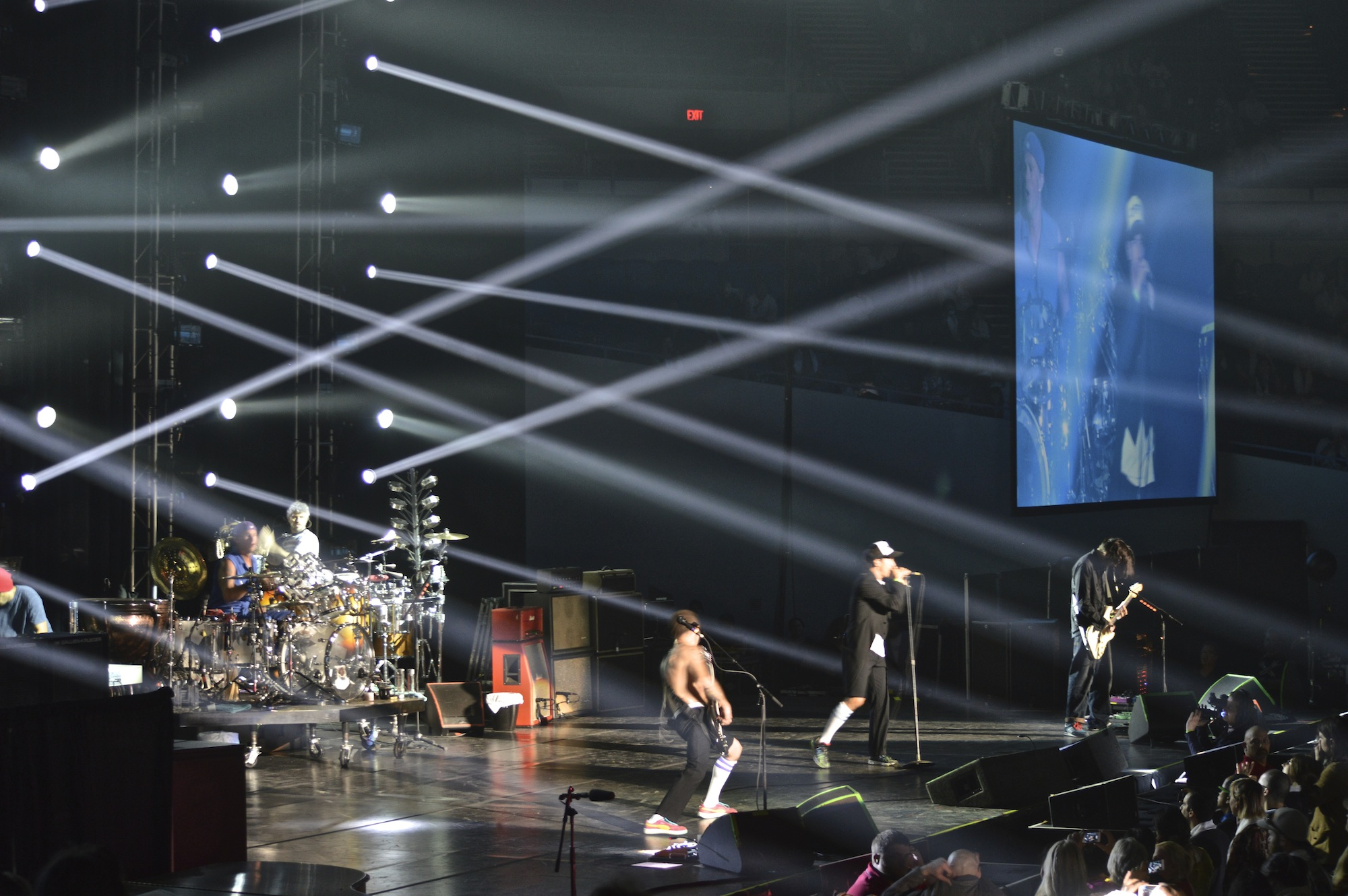
American rock band Red Hot Chili Peppers were one of the bands that performed in the International Music Festival event.

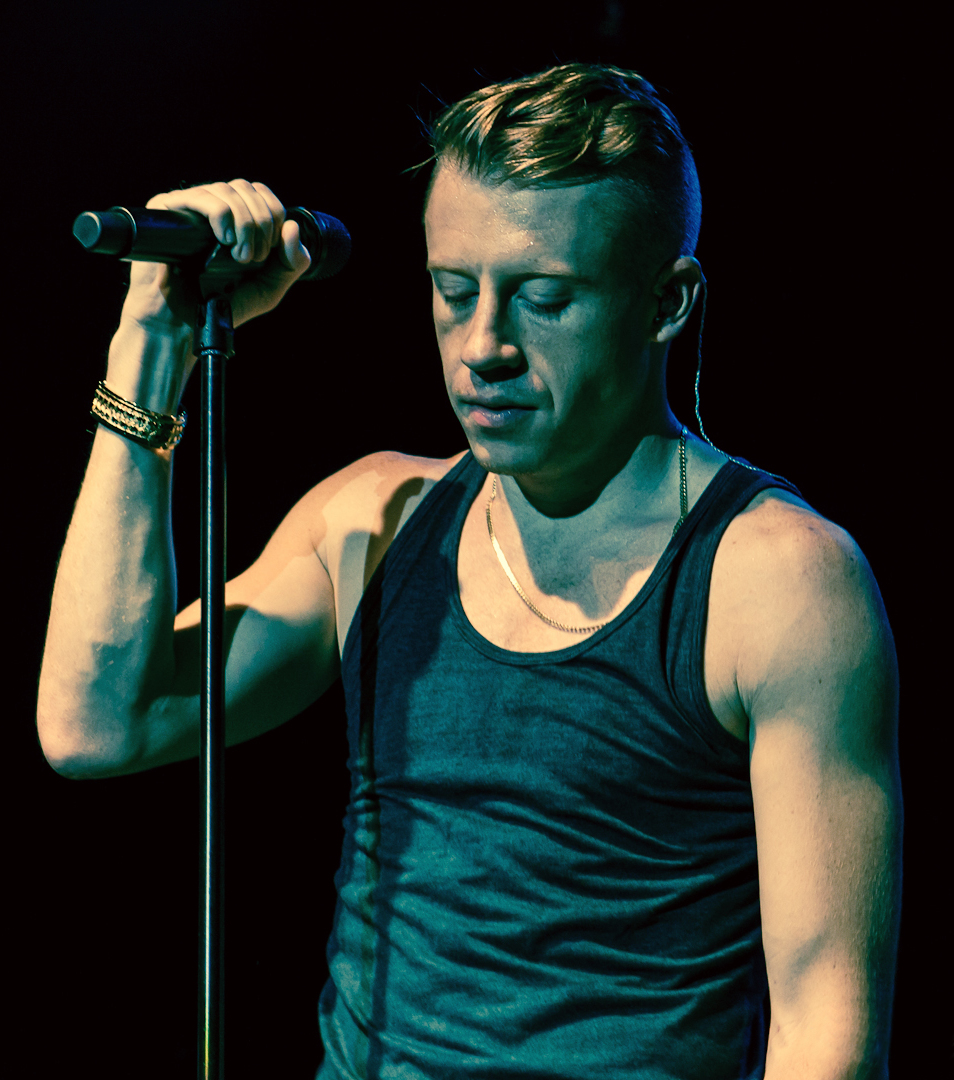
Macklemore performing in Toronto during The Heist Tour in November 2012

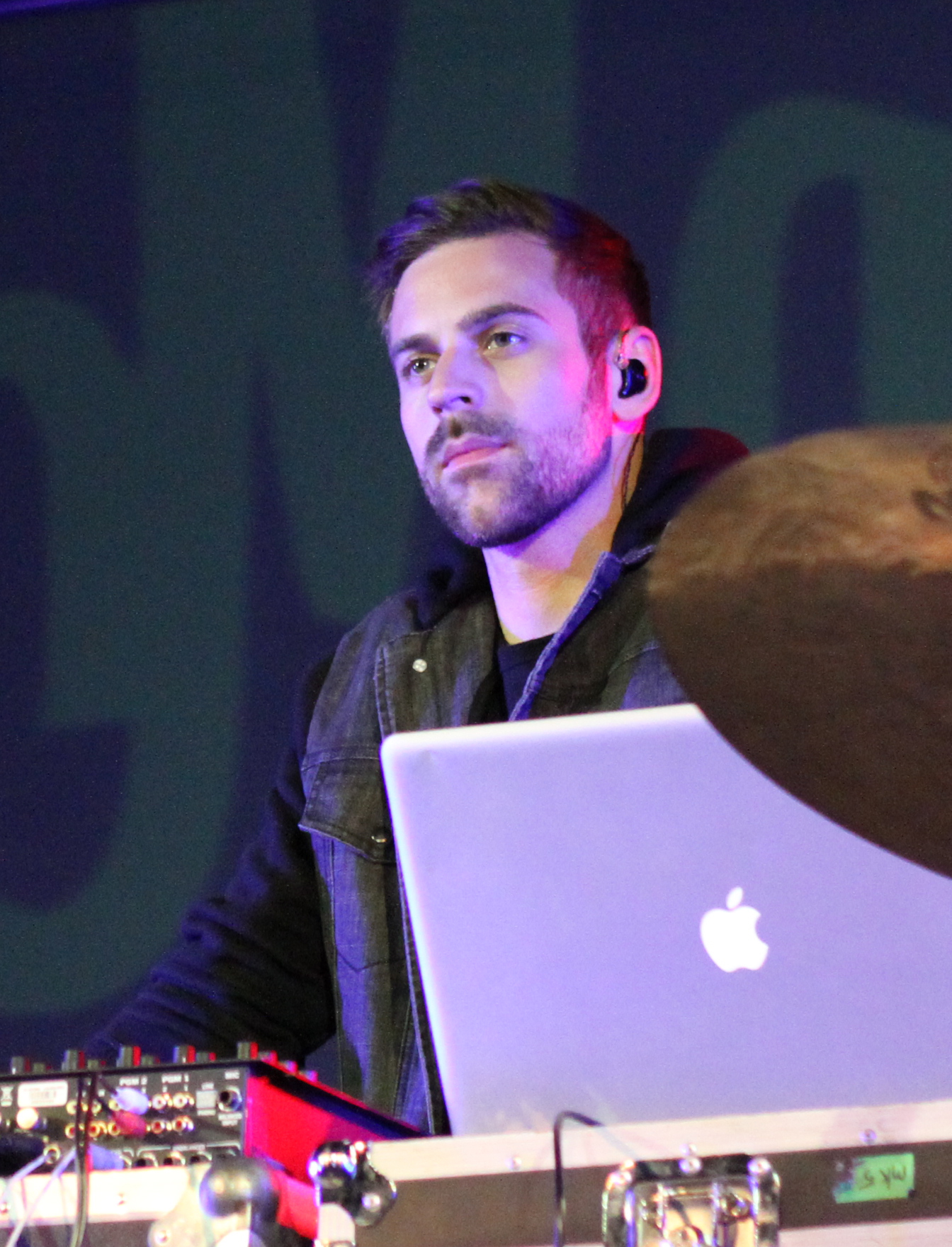
Lewis performing with Macklemore in February 2013

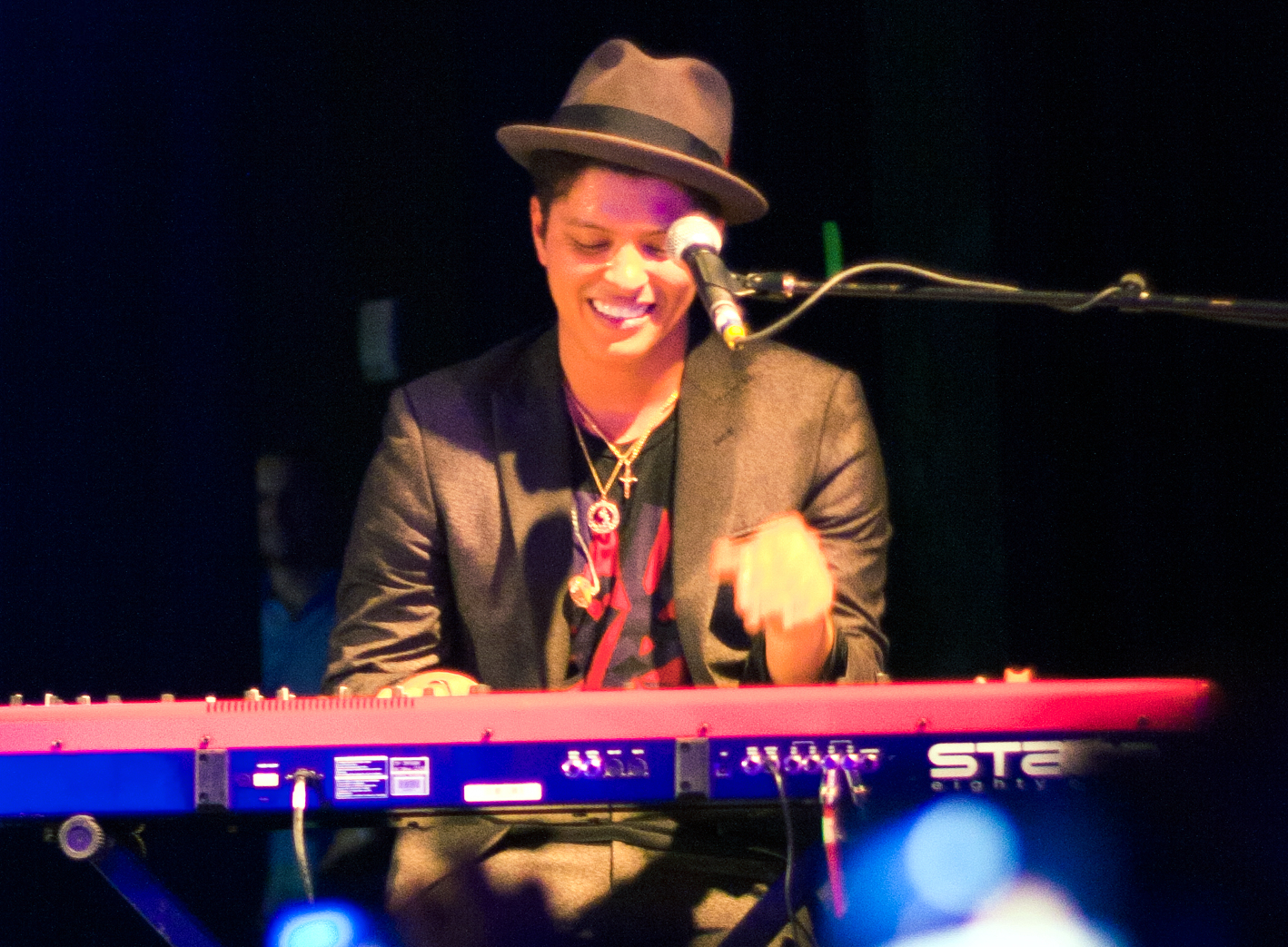
Bruno Mars, a popular American singer known for "Nothin' on You", "Billionaire" and other hits.

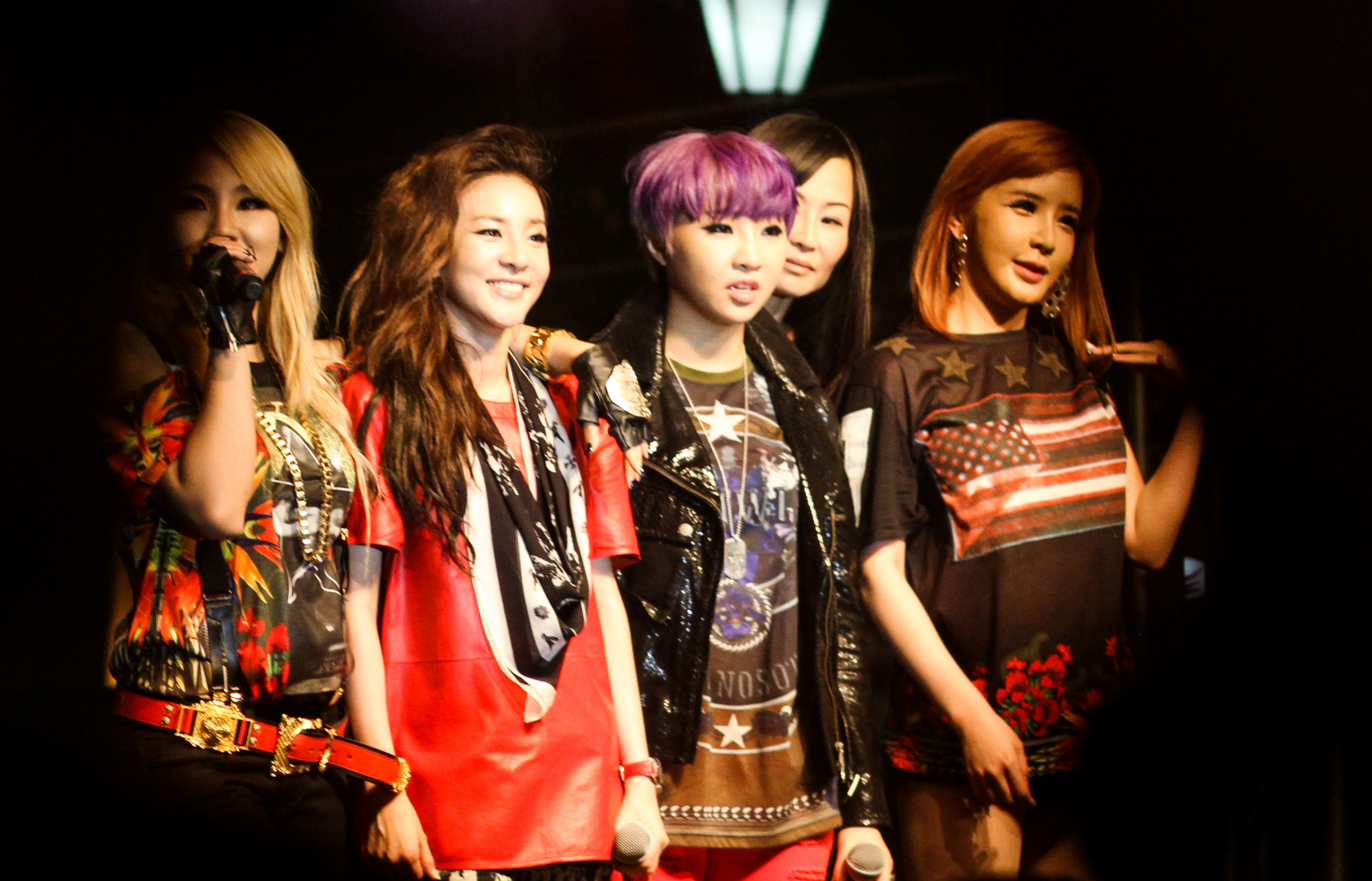
Manila will be one of the stops of the Korean pop group 2NE1's world tour.

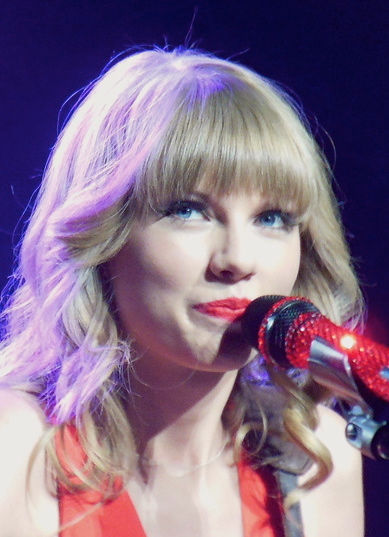
Taylor Swift performing in St. Louis during the 2013 Red Tour.

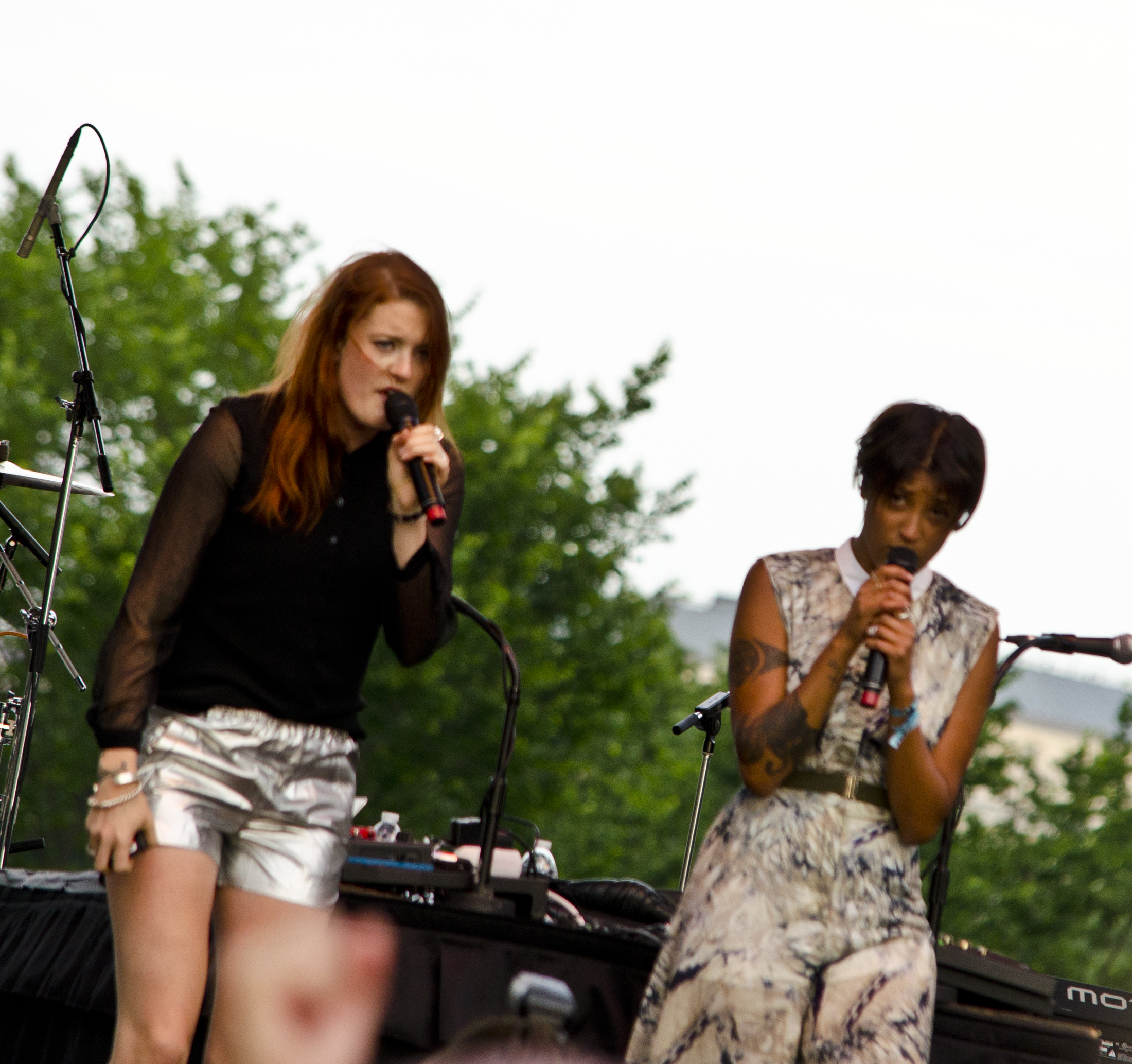
Icona Pop performing at Capital Pride in Washington, D.C., on June 9, 2013

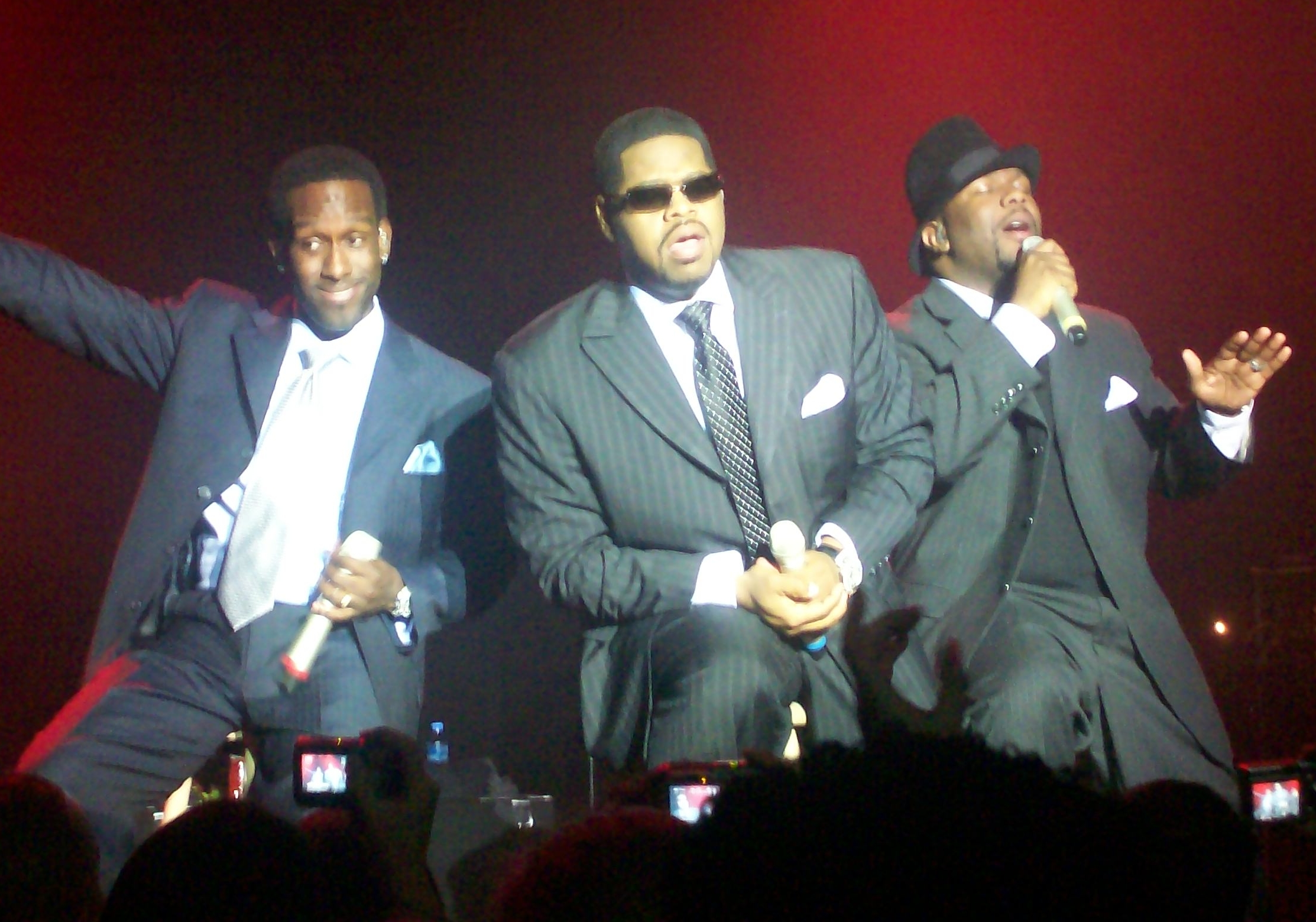
Boyz II Men performing at Vega, Copenhagen..

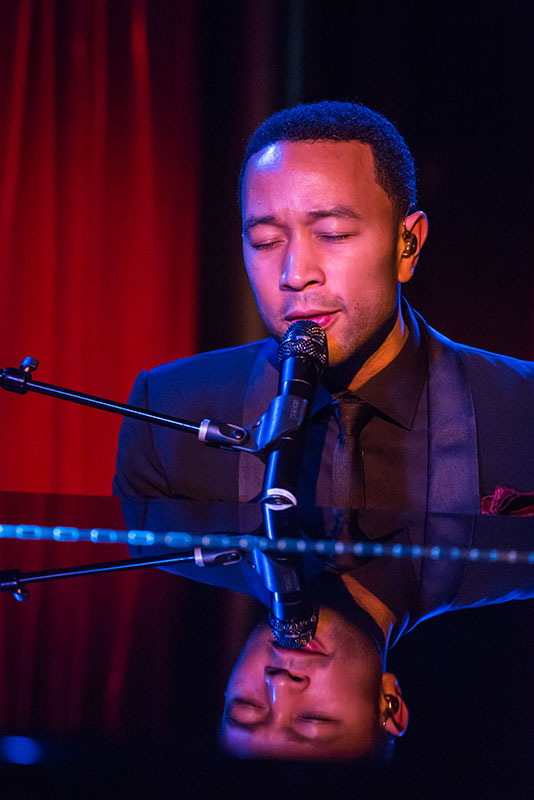
John Legend at the Citi Presents Evenings with Legends show on January 29, 2014, in New York.

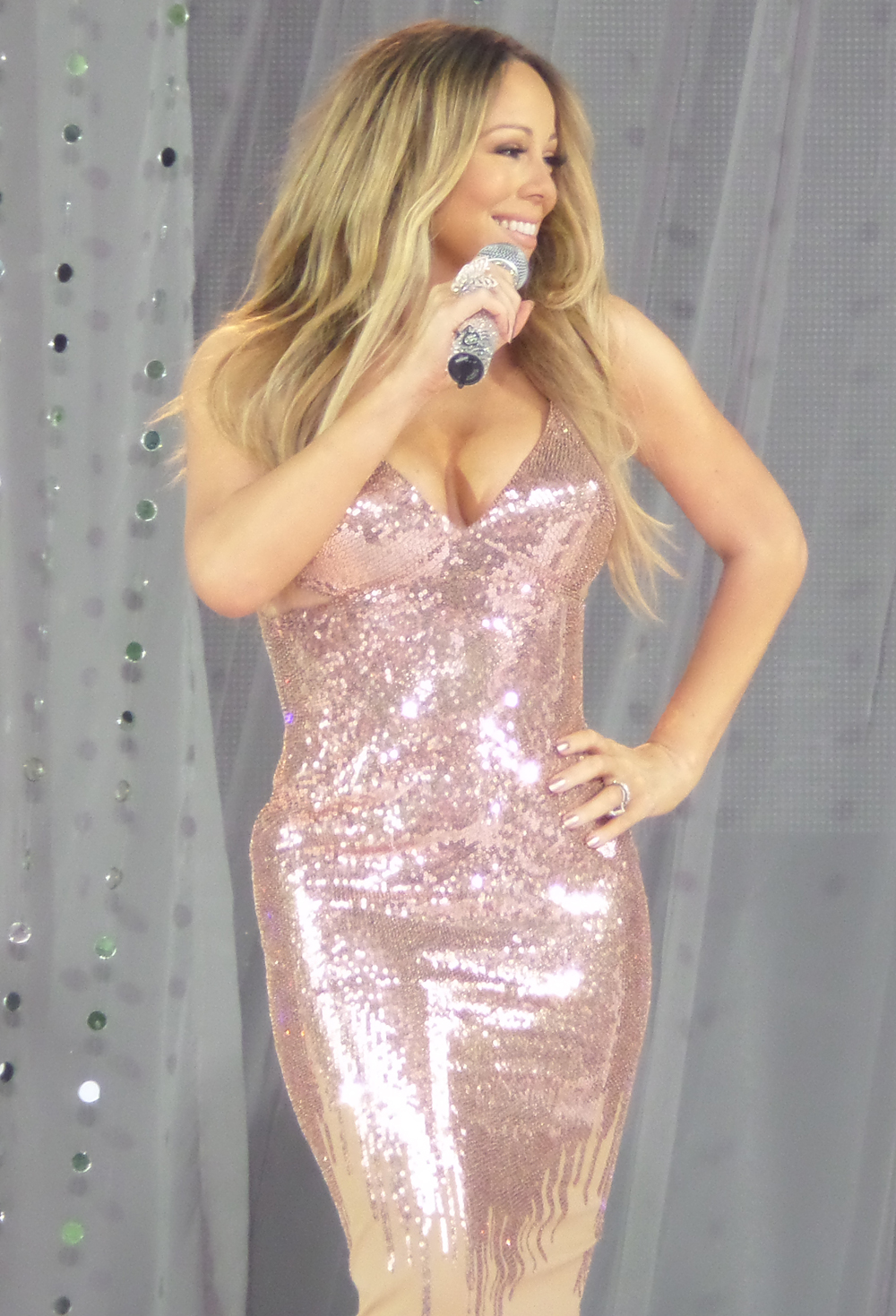
Mariah Carey in May 2013

- January 11–12: Capital Cities: live at Ayala Malls
- January 17: The Bootleg Beatles: live at the PICC Plenary Hall
- January 18:
  - The Bootleg Beatles: live at the SMX Davao Convention Center
  - Sitti Navarro live at the Music Museum
  - Lea Salonga's Playlist: The Repeat live at the PICC Plenary Hall
- January 19: The Bootleg Beatles: live at the Grand Ballroom, Solaire Resort & Casino
- January 20: Frankie Valli and the Four Seasons: live at the Newport Performing Arts Theater, Resorts World Manila
- January 21: Phoenix: live at the World Trade Center
- January 29–30: Boublil and Schönberg's Do You Hear the People Sing? benefit concert live at the Newport Performing Arts Theater, Resorts World Manila
- February 1: David Pack Live in Manila 2014 at the Grand Ballroom, Solaire Resort & Casino
- February 2: Dream K-Pop Fantasy Concert 2 featuring Super Junior-M, BTOB, Block B, A-Jax, BAP, and A-Prince: live at the Smart Araneta Coliseum
- February 6: Periphery Live in Manila at SM Skydome
- February 7:
  - Bamboo Mañalac and Yeng Constantino: By Request concert live at the Waterfront Cebu City Hotel & Casino
  - Freestyle and Crib live at Bagaberde 101, Boom na Boom Complex
- February 7–8: My Bloody Valentines at the Scream Park Manila
- February 8: Jed Madela: Love in the Island: A Valentine Concert with Jed Madela at the Tejeros Grand Ballroom, Island Cove Hotel and Leisure Park
- February 9: It's All About Love: Golden Voices, Golden Hearts at the Tanghalang Aurelio Tolentino, CCP Complex
- February 12:
  - Rufa Mae Quinto and Gladys Guevarra: No Husband, No Lover: A Funny Valentine Concert at the Music Museum
  - Juris and Chester John at the Bagaberde 101, Boom na Boom Complex
- February 13:
  - Valentine Serenades: Bo Cerrudo and Robert Seña at the Grand Ballroom, Solaire Resort & Casino
  - Mogwai and Warpain live at the Metrotent Convention Center (part of the FebFest 2014: Hostess Club Manila concert)
- February 13–14:
  - Jack Jones: A Valentine Concert live at the Smart Araneta Coliseum and the Manila Hotel Tent
  - The Circus Band and The New Minstrels: We Got the Love The Greatest Hits Reunion live at the PICC Plenary Hall
- February 13–15: Ogie Alcasid: Samahang Walang Ka-Valentine live at the Music Museum
- February 13–16: Kuwerdas ng Pagkakaisa: Philippine Rondalla Festival live at the Tanghalang Aurelio Tolentino, Cultural Center of the Philippines
- February 14:
  - Martin Nievera and Regine Velasquez: With Love, Martin & Regine at the SM Mall of Asia Arena
  - Julia Fordham Love Moves: Julia Fordham Live in Manila at the Solaire Resort & Casino
  - Russell Thompkins Jr. and the New Stylistics Live in Manila at Isla Grand Ballroom, Edsa Shangri-la
  - Leo Valdez and Kuh Ledesma: The King and the Diva Beyond Classic at the Newport Performing Arts Theater, Resorts World Manila
  - Michael Johnson: A Night of Love and Music with Michael Johnson at the Fontana Hot Springs Leisure Parks, Pampanga
  - Hotdog: A Valentine Concert... Pakagat Pa Nga! at The Library, Metrowalk Plaza
  - Reo Brothers of Tacloban at the Armada Hotel Manila
- February 14–15: My Bloody Valentines at the Scream Park Manila
- February 15:
  - Russell Thompkins Jr. and the New Stylistics Live in Manila at Resort World Manila
  - The Circus Band and The New Minstrels: We Got the Love The Greatest Hits Reunion live at the SMX Davao Convention Center
- February 16: The Ultimate Valentines with Dan Hellix and Rex Smith at the Solaire Grand Ballroom, Solaire Resort & Casino
- February 17: Avril Lavigne live at the Smart Araneta Coliseum
- February 20: The National and Youth Lagoon live at the Metrotent Convention Center (part of the FebFest 2014: Hostess Club Manila concert)
- February 21: Freestyle and Crib live at Bagaberde 101, Boom na Boom Complex
- February 22:
  - Miss Rachelle – A Send Off Concert at the Meralco Theater
  - My Bloody Valentines at the Scream Park Manila
- February 22–23: 7107 International Music Festival at Global Gateway Logistics City, Angeles City featuring Red Hot Chili Peppers, Kaskade, Empire of the Sun, Kendrick Lamar, The Asteroids Galaxy Tour, The Red Jumpsuit Apparatus, Natives, DJ Riddler, Reid Stefan
- February 27 – March 3: Malasimbo Music & Arts Festival 2014 Live at Puerto Galera
- February 28: Jonalyn Viray: Fearless concert Live at the Music Museum
- March 4: Earth Wind & Fire Experience with Al McKay Live in Manila at the Solaire Resort & Casino
- March 8:
  - Mayday Parade Live in Manila at SM Skydome
  - Bamboo Mañalac and Yeng Constantino: By Request concert live at the University of Southeastern Philippines Gym
- March 11: Incognito Live in Manila at the Solaire Resort and Casino
- March 15: Sam Concepcion: No Limitations concert live at the Music Museum
- March 16:
  - Bamboo Mañalac and Yeng Constantino: By Request concert live at the University of Baguio
  - Macklemore & Ryan Lewis: World Tour 2014 live at the SM Mall of Asia Arena
  - Solaire Turns One: Jessica Sanchez in Concert Live at the Solaire Resort and Casino
- March 19: Il Divo: A Musical Affair at the Newport Performing Arts Theater, Resorts World Manila
- March 21: ABBAmania Live in Manila 2014 at the Solaire Resort and Casino
- March 22: Bruno Mars: The Moonshine Jungle Tour live at the SM Mall of Asia Arena
- March 27–28: Passion Manila 2014 at the Smart Araneta Coliseum
- March 28: Tony Hadley: Live in Manila 2014 at the Solaire Resort & Casino
- March 28–29: The 1975 Live at the Ayala Malls
- March 29: Renee Olstead: Summertime Tour Live at the Isla Grand Ballroom of the EDSA Shangri-la Hotel
- March 29–30: Barney's Birthday Bash Musical Concert at the SM Mall of Asia Arena
- April 4:
  - Throwback Giveback: Side A, Ryzza Mae Dizon and Nyoy Volante's Benefit Concert for the I-Help Foundation at the Aliw Theater
  - “80s Throwback Concert” Dance Party featuring When in Rome Live at the Solaire Resort & Casino Grand Ballroom
- April 5:
  - Lionel Richie – All the Hits, All Night Long Tour Live at the Smart Araneta Coliseum
  - Close Up Forever Summer Music Festival (with DJ Alesso, Denizkoyu, Helena) at Circuit Event Grounds, Makati
- April 8:
  - SenyorROCK featuring Pepe Smith, Wally Gonzales, Sampaguita, Resty Fabunan & Lolita Carbon Live at the Hard Rock Cafe Makati
  - Moonpools and Caterpillars concert live at the Amber Ultra Lounge, The Fort Strip, Bonifacio Global City.
- April 9:
  - Jimmy Needham Live in Manila at the CCF Center
  - Moonpools and Caterpillars concert live at the Outpost, Cebu City.
- April 11–12: Arise: Gary V. 3.0 30th Anniversary Concert Live at the Smart Araneta Coliseum
- April 13: Michael Gungor and Jars of Clay Live in Manila at the Bonifacio Global City
- April 25: Earth Day Jam 2014 at the Bonifacio Global City, Taguig.
- April 26:
  - Pulp Summer Slam 2014: Children of the Damned at the Amoranto Stadium
  - Summer Myx Fest 2014 with Kamikazee, Rico Blanco and DJ Tom Taus at the Bama Grill & Restaurant, Station 1, Boracay, Aklan.
- April 30
  - DOS: The Daniel Padilla Concert Live at the Smart Araneta Coliseum
  - The Pretty Reckless Live in Manila at the Samsung Hall, SM Aura Premier
- May 3: ABS-CBN Philharmonic Orchestra Spotlight Series: The Music of Ryan Cayabyab @ Tanghalang Nicanor Abelardo, Cultural Center of the Philippines Complex
- May 6: Earl Klugh Live in Manila at the PICC Plenary Hall
- May 9: The Righteous Brothers' Bill Medley and The Platters Live in Manila at the Solaire Resort & Casino
- May 12: Children of Bodom Live in Manila at the SM SkyDome, SM City North Edsa
- May 14: The Cascades and the Classics IV with Kyle Vincent concert live at the Solaire Resort & Casino
- May 15:
  - Berta Rojas Live in Manila at the Meralco Theater
  - The Teeth: The Reunion Concert Live at Metrowalk, Ortigas Center, Pasig
- May 16:
  - Anne Curtis in The Forbidden Concert: Round 2: Anne-Kapal Live at the Smart Araneta Coliseum
  - Jazzified: KZ Tandingan & Markki Stroem concert Live at the Music Museum
- May 17:
  - 2NE1: World Tour 2014: All or Nothing live at the SM Mall of Asia Arena
  - Before You Exit Live in Manila at the Samsung Hall, SM Aura Premier
  - Wanderland Music and Arts Festival @ Globe Circuit Event Grounds, Makati
  - Berta Rojas Live in Cebu
  - Rock & Soul: Jovit Baldivino & Thor Live at the Music Museum
- May 28:
  - Village People Live in Manila at the Solaire Resort & Casino
- May 29: Village People Live in Cebu at the Waterfront Hotel & Resort Cebu
- May 30:
  - Bigfish Live Presents: Armin Van Buuren Intense Tour @ Manila at the SM Mall of Asia Arena
  - Village People Live in Davao at the SMX Convention Center, SM Lanang Premier Davao
- June 3: Extreme Live in Manila
- June 5: Vertical Horizon Live in Manila at the Newport Performing Arts Theater, Resorts World Manila
- June 6: Taylor Swift RED Tour Live in Manila at the SM Mall of Asia Arena
- June 7:
  - Pulp Live World presents We The Kings Live in Manila @ SM SkyDome, SM City North Edsa
  - Lee Eun Mee Live in Manila @ Resorts World Manila
- June 11: Bone Thugz-N-Harmony Live in Manila at the Mall of Asia Arena.
- June 13: Hillsong United Live in Manila at the Smart Araneta Coliseum
- June 14: Indie Jam 2014 Live at the A. Venue Open Ground, Makati
- June 20: China Crisis Live in Manila at the Solaire Resort and Casino
- June 26: Icona Pop Live in Manila at the Raven Boutique Club, Bonifacio Global City, Taguig.
- June 28: Gerald Santos, It's Time Concert at the SM SkyDome, SM City North EDSA
- June 29: Digimon Super Megaforce Fusion Live at MOA Arena
- July 9: Tony Orlando Live at the Newport Performing Arts Theater, Resorts World Manila
- July 14: Jessie J Live at the Smart Araneta Coliseum
- July 24:
  - ABS-CBN Philharmonic Orchestra Spotlight Series featuring Andrew Santos at the Meralco Theater, Pasig.
  - Disclosure live at the World Trade Center
- July 25: I Heart You 2!: Be Careful with My Heart 2nd Year Anniversary & Thanksgiving Concert at the Smart Araneta Coliseum, Quezon City.
- August 2:
  - Arise: Gary V. 3.0 30th Anniversary Concert The Repeat Live at the Mall of Asia Arena.
  - John Ford Coley live at the Solaire Resort and Casino
- August 8: The Dawn: Landmarks Live at the Music Museum
- August 31: Bazooka Rocks III Live at the SMX Convention Center, SM Mall of Asia
- September 6: B1A4 live at the Smart Araneta Coliseum.
- September 12: David Blaine live at the Smart Araneta Coliseum
- September 17: Boyz II Men Live at the Smart Araneta Coliseum.
- September 19:
  - Callalily: Happy Together concert at the Music Museum
  - CNBlue Can't Stop Tour 2014 live at the Smart Araneta Coliseum.
- September 26: John Legend: The All of Me Tour Live in Manila 2014 at the Smart Araneta Coliseum.
- October 1:
  - Shane Filan You and Me Tour live at the World Trade Center.
  - Hardwell live in Manila at the Mall of Asia Arena.
- October 3:
  - Toni Gonzaga Concert live at the Mall of Asia Arena
  - Neverland Manila live at the Mall of Asia Concert Grounds.
- October 5: KNation Music Showcase 2014 live at the Mall of Asia Arena
- October 22: Magic Live at the Resorts World Manila.
- October 28: Mariah Carey: Me, I Am Mariah World Tour live at the Mall of Asia Arena
- November 5: The 2014 Clean Air Concert live at the Fairview Terraces
- November 21: ICON The Concert with Rico Blanco, Gloc-9 and Yeng Constantino live at the Smart Araneta Coliseum
- November 27: Jason Mraz and Raining Jane Live at the Smart Araneta Coliseum.
- December 13: Julie Anne San Jose Hologram Concert live at the Mall of Asia Arena

=== No definite schedule ===
- Megadeth Live in Manila 2014 at the World Trade Center (Initially scheduled on March 7 but was cancelled and moved to a yet to be announced date)

=== Cancelled dates ===
- January 29: Selena Gomez Stars Dance Tour live at the Smart Araneta Coliseum.
- July 28: The Lumineers Live in Manila 2014 at the World Trade Center.
- November 29: Celine Dion Asia 2014 Tour live at the Mall of Asia Arena.
