= Hunting Grounds =

Australian punk band

- Also known as: Howl
- Origin: Ballarat, Victoria, Australia
- Genres: Glam punk
- Members: Jonathon Crawford; Daniel Marie; Lachlan Morrish; Michael Belsar; Galen Strachan; Tim Street

Hunting Grounds (formerly known as Howl after the Allen Ginsberg poem of the same name) are an Australian punk band. They formed at Ballarat High School and won Triple J's Unearthed High competition with their song "Blackout" which was placed on high rotation by the station.

In 2010 Hunting Grounds supported fellow Ballarat act Yacht Club DJs on their Batten Down the Hatches Australian Tour. The tour was sold out and the two bands fronted two encore shows at St Kilda's Prince of Wales Bandroom.

== Discography ==
=== Album ===
- In Hindsight (2012)

=== EPs ===
- Howl (2009)
- Brothers in Violence (2010)
