= Finbarr Dwyer =

- Also known as: Finbar Dwyer
- Born: 20 September 1946; Castletownbere, County Cork, Ireland
- Died: 8 February 2014 (aged 67) Mallow, County Cork, Ireland
- Genre: Irish
- Occupation: Musician
- Instruments: Button accordion, fiddle, guitar
- Years active: 1950s–2014

Finbarr Dwyer (often misspelled as "Finbar Dwyer") (20 September 1946 – 8 February 2014) was a traditional Irish accordion player from the famed Dwyer musical family. He was born in Castletownbere, County Cork on 20 September 1946, began playing accordion at the age of three, and began composing at the age of nine. Both of his parents played accordion and his father also played fiddle. His brothers Richard (died 2026) and Michael (died 1997) likewise played accordion, while his brother John (1933—2020) played fiddle. In 1969 he won the All-England accordion title. He died on 8 February 2014, in Mallow, County Cork, Ireland.

== Compositions ==
The following tunes are some of the most widely recorded ones that have been credited as compositions by Finbarr Dwyer in commercial recordings by a variety of Irish traditional musicians:

- Ahern's Egg
- Ardgroom Polka
- Beare Island Reel, published at least as early as 1974
- Berehaven, published at least as early as 1970
- Farewell to Kilroe, published at least as early as 1970
- Finbarr Dwyer's (Ng #627)
- Finbarr Dwyer's (Ng #5436)
- Holly Bush, published at least as early as 1974
- Kylebrack Rambler, published at least as early as 1979

There are more tunes that have been credited to Finbarr Dwyer, but have either not been commercially recorded by other musicians or have only been credited to him according to less reliable sources.

== Discography ==
This may not yet be a complete discography. Some of the Outlet releases listed below may in fact be reissues or compilations of each other's material.

- Finbarr Dwyer with Teresa McMahon. Irish Traditional Accordionist. Outlet OLP 1004, 1970. Finbarr Dwyer, accordion. Teresa McMahon, piano. Recorded at International Studios, Belfast. Producer: Billy McBurney. Engineer: Cel Fay.
  - One track from this album, "Trim the Velvet / Berehaven," was included on The Champions. 9 Outlet champions play 16 of their best tracks of Irish traditional music, Outlet SOLP 1023, 1974.
  - Reissue: Finbarr Dwyer with Teresa McMahon. Pure Traditional Irish Accordion Music. Outlet PTI CD 1004, 1994. Finbarr Dwyer, accordion. Teresa McMahon, piano. Contents: The pigeon on the gate; Gillespies—Hill 60; The spring well—The pipe on the job; Kitty's rambles—West the hill; The Druid's field—The fries breeches—Banish misfortune; Tatter Jack Welsh—Trim the velvet; Berehaven—The groves of Slaney; The iron gate—Paddy Ryan's dream; Farewell to Cailroe—Finbarr Dwyer's no. 2; The meadow—The concert flute; Upstairs in a tent—John Dwyer's; Paddy Taylor's.
  - Reissue exactly as above but with original title: Finbarr Dwyer with Teresa McMahon. Irish Traditional Accordionist. Outlet PTI CD 1004, 1994.
  - Five tracks from this album were included in the 2-volume anthology Festival of Traditional Irish Music first released as Outlet Records CHCD 1037, 1994. See a corrected contents listing of that anthology at irishtune.info.
  - Four tracks from this album were reissued as Finbarr Dwyer's contributions to this compilation: Joe Burke, Finbarr Dwyer, Kevin Loughlin and John Whelan. Titled either Session with Four Accordion Champions as Outlet SOLP 1027, or Pure Irish Traditional Accordion. Session with Four Irish Champions, as Outlet PTI CD 1027. See a corrected contents listing at irishtune.info.
  - Reissue: As CD 2, Finbarr Dwyer, of the 10-CD packaged set Celtic Souls. Irish Celtic Ballads & Traditional Music. IML Irish Music Licensing, released 5 September 1996. ISBN 978-3-86562-775-9. See a corrected contents listing at irishtune.info.
  - Reissue: Finbar [sic] Dwyer. Kitty's Rambles. All Media Entertainment, SICD5015, 2007 and/or 2009, released 9 April 2009.
- Finbarr Dwyer. The Best of Finbarr Dwyer. Outlet OLP 1011, 1971. With Teresa McMahon (piano). Contents: Side A-1: 1/ Paddy Kelly's Reel (P Kelly) – 2/ Finbar Dwyer's No. 1 & Mary McMahon (trad) reels—3/ Reevey's & The Bees Wing (trad) hornpipes—4/ The Mason's Apron (trad) reel—5/ Paddy Fahy's Favourite (trad) / Paddy Murphy's Wife (trad) reels—6/ The Golden Eagle (trad) & The Sunshine Hornpipes (trad). Side A-2: 1/ John Dwyer's Reels (J.Dwyer) & Reevey's (trad) – 2/ Paddy Fah's (sic) Jig (P. Fahy) & Hideout (jigs) – 3/ Cosgraves (trad) & The Laughing Reel (L. Dwyer) (reels) – 4/ The Wheels of the World (trad) & Pinch of Snuff (reels) – 5/ Sheik Billy (F. Dwyer) & The Copper Beech (F. Dwyer) (reels) – 6/ The College Grove (trad) (reel)
  - The fourth track from this album, "The Mason's Apron" was included on The Champions. 9 Outlet champions play 16 of their best tracks of Irish traditional music, Outlet SOLP 1023, 1974.
  - The same track, "The Mason's Apron," was also included in the 2-volume anthology Festival of Traditional Irish Music first released as Outlet Records CHCD 1037, 1994. See a corrected contents listing of that anthology at irishtune.info.
- Finbarr Dwyer. Ireland's Own Traditional Accordionist. Finbarr Dwyer, accordion. Teresa McMahon, piano. Outlet OLP 1016, 1971. Contents: Sean in a Fog (Sean Sa Cheo) cut #A.01a—Guager cut #A.01b—Father Kelly's [Reel] cut #A.02a—Mamma's Pet cut #A.02b—Ross Favourite (Jig) cut #A.03—Jenny's Welcome to Charlie cut #A.04—Ryan's (Hornpipe) cut #A.05a—High Level (Bridge) Hornpipe cut #A.05b—Sligo Maid, cut #A.06a—Sally Gardens cut #A.06b—Paddy Kelly's (Reel) cut #B.01—Galway Hornpipe cut #B.02—Betty's Fancy cut #B.03a—Grant's Reel cut #B.03b—Paddy Taylors Fancy cut #B.04a—New York Jig cut #B.04b—Augrim Jig cut #B.05—Johnny Allen's (Reel) cut #B.06a—Shoemaker's Daughter cut #B.06b
- Finbarr Dwyer. Star of Ireland. Silver Hill PSH 106, 1976. Traditional music arranged by Dwyer. Program notes on container by Frank Conroy. Contents: Mulhare's; Miss McLeod's – Teelin reel; Star of Ireland—Ahearne's egg; Fahy's – Tom Wall's downfall; Floggin reel—High level—Paddy Fahy's; Canadian no. 2 – Star of Munster; Jimmy's folly—Moving cloud; The dawn—Dead piper; My darling asleep—Mahoney's reel—Larry Reddigan's reels—Cooley's; Joe O'Malley's favourite.
- Finbarr Dwyer. Ireland's Champion Traditional Accordionist. Outlet SOLP 1032, 1977.
- Finbarr Dwyer. Gems for Accordion. Audiocassette. Tara, n.d.
- Finbarr Dwyer. Accordion Music from the Soul. 2007. Contents: Finbarr Dwyer's Fancy—Richard Dwyers jigs—Rakish Paddy; The crib of perches—The fly by night—Clais an admid; Paddy Kelly's fancy—Waltz of the birds—Finbarr Dwyer's favourite; Emelda Roland's reel—The Lake Shore; The exile's return—Molly Bawn—Paddy Fahy's; The old thatched cabin—Whistling Rufus; Marching through Georgia—Alpine slopes. See a corrected contents listing at irishtune.info.
- Robbie Hannan, Finbarr Dwyer. The Tempest. Na Píobairí Uilleann, [2008]. Vol. 3 of the series Ace and Deuce of Piping.
