= Porto do Mangue =

Municipality in Rio Grande do Norte, Brazil

Coordinates: 5°04′S 36°47′W

- Municipality
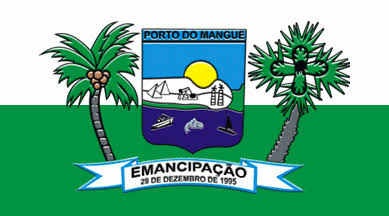
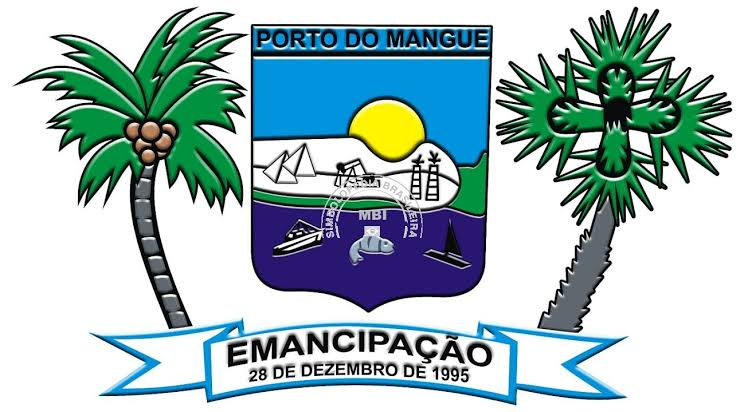
- Flag Coat of arms
- Interactive map of Porto do Mangue
- Country: Brazil
- Region: Nordeste
- State: Rio Grande do Norte
- Mesoregion: Oeste Potiguar

Population (2020)
  - Total: 6,522
- Time zone: UTC−3 (BRT)

Porto do Mangue is a municipality in the state of Rio Grande do Norte in the Northeast region of Brazil.

== See also ==
- List of municipalities in Rio Grande do Norte
