= List of number-one digital albums of 2015 (Australia) =

ARIA Charts number-one digital albums of 2015 < 2014 2016 >

Other Australian number-one charts of 2015
- albums
- singles
- urban singles
- dance singles
- club tracks
- digital tracks
- streaming tracks

Top Australian singles and albums of 2015
- Triple J Hottest 100
- top 25 singles
- top 25 albums

The ARIA Albums Chart ranks the best-performing albums and extended plays (EPs) in Australia. Its data, published by the Australian Recording Industry Association, is based collectively on the weekly digital sales of albums and EPs.

== Chart history ==
Date	Album	Artist(s)	Ref.
5 January	1989	Taylor Swift	
12 January	1989	Taylor Swift	
19 January	Title	Meghan Trainor	
26 January	Uptown Special	Mark Ronson	
2 February	1989	Taylor Swift	
9 February	1989	Taylor Swift	
16 February	Fifty Shades of Grey: Original Motion Picture Soundtrack	Various Artists	
23 February	Fifty Shades of Grey: Original Motion Picture Soundtrack	Various Artists	
2 March	Fifty Shades of Grey: Original Motion Picture Soundtrack	Various Artists	
9 March	Fan of a Fan	Chris Brown and Tyga	
16 March	Rebel Heart	Madonna	
23 March	To Pimp a Butterfly	Kendrick Lamar	
30 March	Chaos and the Calm	James Bay	
6 April	X	Ed Sheeran	
13 April	Furious 7: Original Motion Picture Soundtrack	Various Artists	
20 April	Furious 7: Original Motion Picture Soundtrack	Various Artists	
27 April	In The Lonely Hour	Sam Smith	
4 May	In The Lonely Hour	Sam Smith	
11 May	Wilder Mind	Mumford & Sons	
18 May	Pitch Perfect 2	Various Artists	
25 May	Dark Night Sweet Night	Hermitude	
1 June	Empires	Hillsong United	
8 June	How Big, How Blue, How Beautiful	Florence and the Machine	
15 June	Drones	Muse	
22 June	X	Ed Sheeran	
29 June	Coming Home	Leon Bridges	
6 July	Title	Meghan Trainor	
13 July	Title	Meghan Trainor	
20 July	Communion	Years & Years	
27 July	Currents	Tame Impala	
3 August	Node	Northlane	
10 August	Title	Meghan Trainor	
17 August	Compton	Dr. Dre	
24 August	Compton	Dr. Dre	
31 August	Imortalized	Disturbed	
7 September	Beauty Behind the Madness	The Weeknd	
14 September	Wild	Troye Sivan	
21 September	That's the Spirit	Bring Me the Horizon	
28 September	Honeymoon	Lana Del Rey	
5 October	Ire	Parkway Drive	
12 October	Triple J's Like a Version 11	Various Artists	
19 October	Limit of Love	Boy & Bear	
26 October	Open Heaven / River Wild	Hillsong Worship	
2 November	Sounds Good Feels Good	5 Seconds of Summer	
9 November	Eleven	Tina Arena	
16 November	Get Weird	Little Mix	
23 November	Purpose	Justin Bieber	
30 November	25	Adele	
7 December	25	Adele	
14 December	A Head Full of Dreams	Coldplay	
21 December	25	Adele	
28 December	Christmas	Michael Bublé	

== Number-one artists ==
Position	Artist	Weeks at No. 1
1	Meghan Trainor	4
1	Taylor Swift	4
2	Adele	3
3	Dr. Dre	2
3	Ed Sheeran	2
3	Sam Smith	2
4	5 Seconds of Summer	1
4	Boy & Bear	1
4	Bring Me The Horizon	1
4	Chris Brown	1
4	Tyga	1
4	Coldplay	1
4	Disturbed	1
4	Hermitude	1
4	Hillsong United	1
4	Florence and the Machine	1
4	James Bay	1
4	Justin Bieber	1
4	Kendrick Lamar	1
4	Leon Bridges	1
4	Little Mix	1
4	Madonna	1
4	Mark Ronson	1
4	Michael Bublé	1
4	Mumford & Sons	1
4	Muse	1
4	Northlane	1
4	Parkway Drive	1
4	Tame Impala	1
4	Tina Arena	1
4	Troye Sivan	1
4	Years & Years	1
4	The Weeknd	1

== See also ==
- 2015 in music
- ARIA Charts
- List of number-one singles of 2015 (Australia)
