= List of number-one country albums of 2015 (Australia) =

ARIA Charts number-one country albums of 2015 < 2014 2016 >

Other Australian number-one charts of 2015
- albums
- singles
- urban singles
- dance singles
- club tracks
- digital tracks
- streaming tracks

Top Australian singles and albums of 2015
- Triple J Hottest 100
- top 25 singles
- top 25 albums

These are the Australian Country number-one albums of 2015, per the ARIA Charts.

| Issue date | Album | Artist |
|---|---|---|
| 5 January | Red | Taylor Swift |
| 12 January | Man Against Machine | Garth Brooks |
| 19 January | Red | Taylor Swift |
| 26 January | Great Women of Country | Melinda Schneider & Beccy Cole |
| 2 February | The Famine and the Feast | O'Shea |
| 9 February | The Story So Far | Keith Urban |
| 16 February | Great Women of Country | Melinda Schneider & Beccy Cole |
| 23 February | Wired | Travis Collins |
| 2 March | Old Boots, New Dirt | Jason Aldean |
| 9 March | So Country 2015 | Various artists |
| 16 March | Friday Night | Jason Owen |
| 23 March | Spirit of the Anzacs | Lee Kernaghan |
| 30 March | Spirit of the Anzacs | Lee Kernaghan |
| 6 April | Spirit of the Anzacs | Lee Kernaghan |
| 13 April | Spirit of the Anzacs | Lee Kernaghan |
| 20 April | Spirit of the Anzacs | Lee Kernaghan |
| 27 April | Spirit of the Anzacs | Lee Kernaghan |
| 4 May | Spirit of the Anzacs | Lee Kernaghan |
| 11 May | Jekyll + Hyde | Zac Brown Band |
| 18 May | Spirit of the Anzacs | Lee Kernaghan |
| 25 May | Spirit of the Anzacs | Lee Kernaghan |
| 1 June | Spirit of the Anzacs | Lee Kernaghan |
| 8 June | Spirit of the Anzacs | Lee Kernaghan |
| 15 June | Django & Jimmie | Willie Nelson & Merle Haggard |
| 22 June | Spirit of the Anzacs | Lee Kernaghan |
| 29 June | 35 Biggest Hits | Tim McGraw |
| 6 July | 35 Biggest Hits | Tim McGraw |
| 13 July | The Hottest Stars on the Planet | Various artists |
| 20 July | The Hottest Stars on the Planet | Various artists |
| 27 July | Something More Than Free | Jason Isbell |
| 3 August | Angels and Alcohol | Alan Jackson |
| 10 August | Angels and Alcohol | Alan Jackson |
| 17 August | Kill The Lights | Luke Bryan |
| 24 August | Kill The Lights | Luke Bryan |
| 31 August | Angels and Alcohol | Alan Jackson |
| 7 September | Angels and Alcohol | Alan Jackson |
| 14 September | Angels and Alcohol | Alan Jackson |
| 21 September | Kill the Lights | Luke Bryan |
| 28 September | Kill the Lights | Luke Bryan |
| 5 October | Kill the Lights | Luke Bryan |
| 12 October | Cold Beer Conversation | George Strait |
| 19 October | 35 MPH Town | Toby Keith |
| 26 October | Hit Country 2016 | Various Artists |
| 2 November | Storyteller | Carrie Underwood |
| 9 November | Storyteller | Carrie Underwood |
| 16 November | Damn Country Music | Tim McGraw |
| 23 November | The Den Tapes | Slim Dusty |
| 30 November | Harvey's Bar ...The Backyard Sessions | Adam Harvey |
| 7 December | Harvey's Bar ...The Backyard Sessions | Adam Harvey |
| 14 December | Harvey's Bar ...The Backyard Sessions | Adam Harvey |
| 21 December | Harvey's Bar ...The Backyard Sessions | Adam Harvey |
| 28 December | Harvey's Bar ...The Backyard Sessions | Adam Harvey |

== See also ==
- 2015 in music
- List of number-one albums of 2015 (Australia)
