= List of top 10 singles for 2015 in Australia =

This is a list of singles that charted in the top ten of the ARIA Charts in 2015. In 2015 fifty-three acts, reached the top ten for the first time.

== Top-ten singles ==
Key

Symbol	Meaning
◁	Indicates single's top 10 entry was also its ARIA top 50 debut
(#)	2015 Year-end top 10 single position and rank

List of ARIA top ten singles that peaked in 2015
Top ten entry date	Single	Artist(s)	Peak	Peak date	Weeks in top ten	References
Singles from 2014
22 December	"Take Me to Church" (#4)	Hozier	2	5 January	16	
Singles from 2015
5 January	"Break the Rules"	Charli XCX	10	5 January	1	
12 January	"Cheerleader" (#2)	Omi	1	26 January	12	
12 January	"Only One" ◁	Kanye West featuring Paul McCartney	8	12 January	1	
19 January	"Hold Back the River"	James Bay	4	19 January	7	
19 January	"Elastic Heart" ◁	Sia	5	26 January	8	
19 January	"Blame It on Me"	George Ezra	10	19 January	1	
26 January	"Fade Out Lines"	The Avener	8	26 January	1	
26 January	"Pray to God"	Calvin Harris featuring Haim	10	26 January	1	
2 February	"Talk Is Cheap"	Chet Faker	6	2 February	2	
2 February	"Sun Goes Down"	Robin Schulz featuring Jasmine Thompson	7	2 February	3	
2 February	"Love Me like You Do" (#7) ◁	Ellie Goulding	1	23 February	10	
2 February	"The Nights"	Avicii	9	2 February	3	
9 February	"FourFiveSeconds" (#10)	Rihanna, Kanye West and Paul McCartney	1	16 February	10	
16 February	"Style"	Taylor Swift	8	16 February	4	
16 February	"Dear Future Husband"	Meghan Trainor	9	16 February	2	
23 February	"Sugar"	Maroon 5	6	2 March	6	
9 March	"Bloodstream" ◁	Ed Sheeran and Rudimental	7	9 March	2	
9 March	"Bills"	LunchMoney Lewis	1	23 March	7	
16 March	"Lay Me Down"	Sam Smith	3	23 March	6	
16 March	"Trouble"	Iggy Azalea featuring Jennifer Hudson	10	16 March	1	
23 March	"Do You Remember"	Jarryd James	2	30 March	9	
23 March	"Lean On" (#6)	Major Lazer and DJ Snake featuring MØ	1	6 April	12	
30 March	"Want to Want Me"	Jason Derulo	4	27 April	8	
6 April	"Where Are Ü Now"	Skrillex and Diplo featuring Justin Bieber	3	20 April	5	
13 April	"See You Again" (#3) ◁	Wiz Khalifa featuring Charlie Puth	1	13 April	11	
20 April	"Runaway (U & I)"	Galantis	4	20 April	4	
20 April	"Wasn't Expecting That"	Jamie Lawson	3	27 April	7	
20 April	"King"	Years & Years	9	20 April	2	
27 April	"Shut Up and Dance" (#8)	Walk the Moon	3	11 May	14	
4 May	"Marvin Gaye"	Charlie Puth featuring Meghan Trainor	4	18 May	5	
4 May	"Hey Mama"	David Guetta featuring Nicki Minaj, Bebe Rexha and Afrojack	5	25 May	8	
11 May	"You Don't Own Me"	Grace featuring G-Eazy	1	25 May	9	
18 May	"Let It Go"	James Bay	8	18 May	2	
25 May	"Bad Blood" ◁	Taylor Swift featuring Kendrick Lamar	1	1 June	8	
25 May	"Flashlight"	Jessie J	2	8 June	5	
25 May	"Fight Song"	Rachel Platten	2	6 July	7	
1 June	"Five More Hours"	Deorro and Chris Brown	7	1 June	3	
8 June	"Start Again" ◁	Conrad Sewell	1	22 June	5	
8 June	"Photograph"	Ed Sheeran	9	15 June	3	
22 June	"Like I’m Gonna Lose You"	Meghan Trainor featuring John Legend	1	29 June	10	
22 June	"Powerful"	Major Lazer featuring Ellie Goulding and Tarrus Riley	7	22 June	4	
29 June	"Black Magic"	Little Mix	8	29 June	3	
29 June	"Firestone"	Kygo featuring Conrad Sewell	10	29 June	1	
6 July	"Can't Feel My Face"	The Weeknd	2	20 July	13	
6 July	"Headlights"	Robin Schulz featuring Ilsey	2	13 July	5	
13 July	"Golden"	Travie McCoy featuring Sia	4	13 July	2	
13 July	"Peanut Butter Jelly"	Galantis	3	3 August	9	
13 July	"Watch Me (Whip/Nae Nae)"	Silentó	9	13 July	3	
20 July	"Are You with Me"	Lost Frequencies	1	27 July	7	
27 July	"Do It Again"	Pia Mia featuring Chris Brown and Tyga	5	3 August	5	
27 July	"How Deep Is Your Love" ◁	Calvin Harris and Disciples	1	31 August	10	
27 July	"She's Kinda Hot" ◁	5 Seconds of Summer	6	27 July	1	
3 August	"Wings" ◁	Delta Goodrem	1	17 August	4	
3 August	"Worth It"	Fifth Harmony featuring Kid Ink	9	3 August	2	
10 August	"Drag Me Down" ◁	One Direction	1	10 August	2	
10 August	"Ghost Town"	Adam Lambert	2	10 August	3	
10 August	"Good for You"	Selena Gomez featuring ASAP Rocky	10	10 August	2	
24 August	"That’s How You Know"	Nico & Vinz featuring Kid Ink and Bebe Rexha	2	31 August	6	
24 August	"Get Stupid"	Aston Merrygold	10	24 August	1	
31 August	"Locked Away"	R. City featuring Adam Levine	2	7 September	8	
31 August	"Wildest Dreams"	Taylor Swift	3	21 September	7	
31 August	"Fire and the Flood"	Vance Joy	6	7 September	4	
31 August	"The Fix" ◁	Nelly featuring Jeremih	3	7 September	7	
7 September	"What Do You Mean?" (#9) ◁	Justin Bieber	1	7 September	19	
7 September	"Downtown" ◁	Macklemore & Ryan Lewis featuring Eric Nally, Melle Mel, Kool Moe Dee and Grandmaster Caz	1	5 October	15	
14 September	"Ain't Nobody (Loves Me Better)"	Felix Jaehn featuring Jasmine Thompson	6	28 September	3	
28 September	"Hula Hoop"	Omi	8	12 October	3	
5 October	"Sugar"	Robin Schulz featuring Francesco Yates	3	5 October	5	
5 October	"On My Mind"	Ellie Goulding	3	12 October	5	
5 October	"This Ain't Love"	Jessica Mauboy	5	12 October	2	
5 October	"Alive" ◁	Sia	10	5 October	1	
12 October	"Hotline Bling"	Drake	2	26 October	6	
19 October	"Wicked Game" ◁	Cyrus	6	19 October	1	
19 October	"Lay It All on Me"	Rudimental featuring Ed Sheeran	7	19 October	5	
19 October	"Dessert"	Dawin	7	26 October	5	
19 October	"The Hills"	The Weeknd	3	26 October	6	
26 October	"Perfect" ◁	One Direction	4	26 October	1	
26 October	"Don't Be So Hard on Yourself"	Jess Glynne	10	26 October	1	
2 November	"Hello" (#5) ◁	Adele	1	2 November	13	
2 November	"Sorry" ◁	Justin Bieber	2	2 November	14	
2 November	"Never Forget You"	Zara Larsson and MNEK	3	16 November	10	
9 November	"Ocean Drive"	Duke Dumont	5	7 December	8	
9 November	"Focus" ◁	Ariana Grande	10	9 November	1	
16 November	"The Trouble with Us"	Marcus Marr and Chet Faker	8	23 November	3	
23 November	"Love Yourself" ◁	Justin Bieber	1	14 December	14	
23 November	"Stitches"	Shawn Mendes	4	7 December	10	
30 November	"Stone" ◁	Cyrus	4	30 November	1	
14 December	"Middle"	DJ Snake featuring Bipolar Sunshine	5	21 December	8	
14 December	"Higher" ◁	Hilltop Hoods featuring James Chatburn	9	14 December	1	
28 December	"In2"	WSTRN	10	28 December	4	

=== 2014 peaks ===
List of ARIA top ten singles in 2015 that peaked in 2014
Top ten entry date	Single	Artist(s)	Peak	Peak date	Weeks in top ten	References
18 August	"Freaks" ◁	Timmy Trumpet and Savage	3	22 September	15	
25 August	"Shake It Off" ◁	Taylor Swift	1	1 September	20	
6 October	"Thinking Out Loud"	Ed Sheeran	1	20 October	17	
3 November	"Lips Are Movin" ◁	Meghan Trainor	3	10 November	11	
10 November	"Cosby Sweater"	Hilltop Hoods	4	1 December	11	
17 November	"Blank Space"	Taylor Swift	1	24 November	11	
1 December	"Uptown Funk" (#1)	Mark Ronson featuring Bruno Mars	1	15 December	21	
8 December	"I'm an Albatraoz" ◁	AronChupa	2	22 December	8	
15 December	"Take Me Over"	Peking Duk featuring SAFIA	6	15 December	5	

=== 2016 peaks ===
List of ARIA top ten singles in 2015 that peaked in 2016
Top ten entry date	Single	Artist(s)	Peak	Peak date	Weeks in top ten	References
28 December	"Fast Car" ◁	Jonas Blue featuring Dakota	1	1 February	9	

== Entries by artist ==
The following table shows artists who achieved two or more top 10 entries in 2015, including songs that reached their peak in 2014 and 2016. The figures include both main artists and featured artists. The total number of weeks an artist spent in the top ten in 2015 is also shown.

Entries	Artist	Weeks	Songs
5	Taylor Swift	23	"Bad Blood", "Blank Space", "Shake It Off", "Style", "Wildest Dreams"
4	Ed Sheeran	14	"Bloodstream", "Lay It All on Me", "Photograph", "Thinking Out Loud"
4	Justin Bieber	22	"Love Yourself", "Sorry", "What Do You Mean?", "Where Are Ü Now"
4	Meghan Trainor	19	"Dear Future Husband", "Like I'm Gonna Lose You", "Lips Are Movin", "Marvin Gaye"
3	Diplo (includes songs as part of Major Lazer)	16	"Lean On", "Powerful", "Where Are Ü Now"
3	Ellie Goulding	19	"Love Me Like You Do", "Powerful", "On My Mind"
3	Robin Schulz	13	"Headlights", "Sugar", "Sun Goes Down"
3	Sia	11	"Alive", "Elastic Heart", "Golden"
2	Adam Levine (includes songs as part of Maroon 5)	14	"Locked Away", "Sugar"
2	Bebe Rexha	14	"Hey Mama", "That's How You Know"
2	Calvin Harris	11	"How Deep Is Your Love", "Pray to God"
2	Charlie Puth	11	"Marvin Gaye", "See You Again"
2	Chet Faker	5	"Talk Is Cheap", "The Trouble with Us"
2	Chris Brown	8	"Do It Again", "Five More Hours"
2	Conrad Sewell	5	"Firestone", "Start Again"
2	Cyrus	2	"Stone", "Wicked Game"
2	DJ Snake	15	"Lean On", "Middle"
2	Felix Jaehn	15	"Cheerleader", "Ain't Nobody (Loves Me Better)"
2	Galantis	13	"Peanut Butter Jelly", "Runaway (U & I)"
2	Hilltop Hoods	4	"Cosby Sweater", "Higher"
2	Jasmine Thompson	6	"Ain't Nobody (Loves Me Better)", "Sun Goes Down"
2	James Bay	9	"Hold Back the River", "Let It Go"
2	Kanye West	11	"FourFiveSeconds", "Only One"
2	Kid Ink	8	"That's How You Know", "Worth It"
2	Major Lazer	16	"Lean On", "Powerful"
2	Omi	15	"Cheerleader", "Hula Hoop"
2	One Direction	3	"Drag Me Down", "Perfect"
2	Paul McCartney	11	"FourFiveSeconds", "Only One"
2	Rudimental	7	"Bloodstream", "Lay It All on Me"
2	The Weeknd	19	"Can't Feel My Face", "The Hills"

== See also ==
- 2015 in music
- ARIA Charts
- List of number-one singles of 2015 (Australia)
- List of top 25 singles for 2015 in Australia
