= List of number-one hits of 2015 (Denmark) =

Tracklisten is a chart that ranks the best-performing singles and tracks of the Denmark. Its data, published by IFPI Denmark and compiled by Nielsen Music Control, is based collectively on each single's weekly digital sales.

== Chart history ==
Issue date	Song	Artist(s)	Ref.
3 January	"Cheerleader"	OMI	
10 January	"Cheerleader"	OMI	
17 January	"Cheerleader"	OMI	
24 January	"Cheerleader"	OMI	
31 January	"Cheerleader"	OMI	
7 February	"Cheerleader"	OMI	
14 February	"Cheerleader"	OMI	
21 February	"Love Me like You Do"	Ellie Goulding	
28 February	"Love Me like You Do"	Ellie Goulding	
7 March	"Love Me like You Do"	Ellie Goulding	
14 March	"FourFiveSeconds"	Rihanna, Kanye West and Paul McCartney	
21 March	"FourFiveSeconds"	Rihanna, Kanye West and Paul McCartney	
28 March	"FourFiveSeconds"	Rihanna, Kanye West and Paul McCartney	
4 April	"FourFiveSeconds"	Rihanna, Kanye West and Paul McCartney	
11 April	"Lean On"	Major Lazer and DJ Snake featuring MØ	
18 April	"See You Again"	Wiz Khalifa featuring Charlie Puth	
25 April	"See You Again"	Wiz Khalifa featuring Charlie Puth	
2 May	"See You Again"	Wiz Khalifa featuring Charlie Puth	
9 May	"See You Again"	Wiz Khalifa featuring Charlie Puth	
16 May	"See You Again"	Wiz Khalifa featuring Charlie Puth	
23 May	"See You Again"	Wiz Khalifa featuring Charlie Puth	
30 May	"See You Again"	Wiz Khalifa featuring Charlie Puth	
6 June	"See You Again"	Wiz Khalifa featuring Charlie Puth	
13 June	"See You Again"	Wiz Khalifa featuring Charlie Puth	
20 June	"See You Again"	Wiz Khalifa featuring Charlie Puth	
27 June	"7 Years"	Lukas Graham	
4 July	"7 Years"	Lukas Graham	
11 July	"7 Years"	Lukas Graham	
18 July	"7 Years"	Lukas Graham	
22 July	"7 Years"	Lukas Graham	
29 July	"Strip No More"	Lukas Graham	
5 August	"7 Years"	Lukas Graham	
12 August	"Can't Feel My Face"	The Weeknd	
19 August	"Can't Feel My Face"	The Weeknd	
26 August	"C'est la vie"	Gilli featuring MellemFingaMuzik	
2 September	"C'est la vie"	Gilli featuring MellemFingaMuzik	
9 September	"What Do You Mean?"	Justin Bieber	
16 September	"What Do You Mean?"	Justin Bieber	
23 September	"Uanset"	Rasmus Seebach	
30 September	"What Do You Mean?"	Justin Bieber	
7 October	"What Do You Mean?"	Justin Bieber	
14 October	"What Do You Mean?"	Justin Bieber	
21 October	"What Do You Mean?"	Justin Bieber	
28 October	"What Do You Mean?"	Justin Bieber	
4 November	"Sorry"	Justin Bieber	
11 November	"Hello"	Adele	
18 November	"Hello"	Adele	
25 November	"Sorry"	Justin Bieber	
2 December	"Sorry"	Justin Bieber	
9 December	"Love Yourself"	Justin Bieber	
16 December	"Love Yourself"	Justin Bieber	
23 December	"Love Yourself"	Justin Bieber	
30 December	"Love Yourself"	Justin Bieber	
