= List of number-one digital tracks of 2015 (Australia) =

ARIA Charts number-one digital tracks of 2015 < 2014 2016 >

Other Australian number-one charts of 2015
- albums
- singles
- urban singles
- dance singles
- club tracks
- streaming tracks

Top Australian singles and albums of 2015
- Triple J Hottest 100
- top 25 singles
- top 25 albums

The ARIA Digital Track Chart is a chart that ranks the best-performing digital tracks singles of Australia. It is published by Australian Recording Industry Association (ARIA), an organisation who collect music data for the weekly ARIA Charts. To be eligible to appear on the chart, the recording must be a single not an EP and only paid downloads counted from downloadable outlets.

== Chart history ==
Key
†	Indicates number-one digital single of 2015

Issue date	Song	Artist(s)	Reference
5 January	"Uptown Funk"†	Mark Ronson featuring Bruno Mars	
12 January	"Uptown Funk"†	Mark Ronson featuring Bruno Mars	
19 January	"Uptown Funk"†	Mark Ronson featuring Bruno Mars	
26 January	"Cheerleader" (Felix Jaehn Remix)	OMI	
2 February	"Cheerleader" (Felix Jaehn Remix)	OMI	
9 February	"Cheerleader" (Felix Jaehn Remix)	OMI	
16 February	"FourFiveSeconds"	Rihanna, Kanye West and Paul McCartney	
23 February	"FourFiveSeconds"	Rihanna, Kanye West and Paul McCartney	
2 March	"Love Me like You Do"	Ellie Goulding	
9 March	"Love Me like You Do"	Ellie Goulding	
16 March	"Love Me like You Do"	Ellie Goulding	
23 March	"Bills"	LunchMoney Lewis	
30 March	"Bills"	LunchMoney Lewis	
6 April	"Lean On"	Major Lazer & DJ Snake featuring MØ	
13 April	"See You Again"	Wiz Khalifa featuring Charlie Puth	
20 April	"See You Again"	Wiz Khalifa featuring Charlie Puth	
27 April	"See You Again"	Wiz Khalifa featuring Charlie Puth	
4 May	"See You Again"	Wiz Khalifa featuring Charlie Puth	
11 May	"See You Again"	Wiz Khalifa featuring Charlie Puth	
18 May	"You Don't Own Me"	Grace featuring G-Eazy	
25 May	"You Don't Own Me"	Grace featuring G-Eazy	
1 June	"Bad Blood"	Taylor Swift	
8 June	"Bad Blood"	Taylor Swift	
15 June	"Bad Blood"	Taylor Swift	
22 June	"Start Again"	Conrad Sewell	
29 June	"Like I'm Gonna Lose You"	Meghan Trainor featuring John Legend	
6 July	"Like I'm Gonna Lose You"	Meghan Trainor featuring John Legend	
13 July	"Like I'm Gonna Lose You"	Meghan Trainor featuring John Legend	
20 July	"Like I'm Gonna Lose You"	Meghan Trainor featuring John Legend	
27 July	"Are You With Me"	Lost Frequencies	
3 August	"Are You With Me"	Lost Frequencies	
10 August	"Drag Me Down"	One Direction	
17 August	"Wings"	Delta Goodrem	
24 August	"Wings"	Delta Goodrem	
31 August	"How Deep Is Your Love"	Calvin Harris & Disciples	
7 September	"What Do You Mean?"	Justin Bieber	
14 September	"What Do You Mean?"	Justin Bieber	
21 September	"What Do You Mean?"	Justin Bieber	
28 September	"What Do You Mean?"	Justin Bieber	
5 October	"Downtown"	Macklemore & Ryan Lewis feat. Eric Nally, Melle Mel, Kool Moe Dee & Grandmaster Caz	
12 October	"What Do You Mean?"	Justin Bieber	
19 October	"Downtown"	Macklemore & Ryan Kewis feat. Eric Nally, Melle Mel, Kool Moe Dee & Grandmaster Flash	
26 October	"Hotline Bling"	Drake	
2 November	"Hello"	Adele	
9 November	"Hello"	Adele	
16 November	"Hello"	Adele	
23 November	"Hello"	Adele	
30 November	"Hello"	Adele	
7 December	"Hello"	Adele	
14 December	"Love Yourself"	Justin Bieber	
21 December	"Love Yourself"	Justin Bieber	
28 December	"Love Yourself"	Justin Bieber	

== Number-one artists ==
Position	Artist	Weeks at No. 1
1	Justin Bieber	8
2	Adele	6
3	Wiz Khalifa	5
3	Charlie Puth (as featuring)	5
4	Meghan Trainor	4
4	John Legend (as featuring)	4
5	Ellie Goulding	3
5	Mark Ronson	3
5	Bruno Mars (as featuring)	3
5	OMI	3
5	Taylor Swift	3
6	Delta Goodrem	2
6	Grace	2
6	G-Eazy	2
6	LunchMoney Lewis	2
6	Rihanna	2
6	Kanye West	2
6	Paul McCartney	2
6	Lost Frequencies	2
6	Macklemore & Ryan Lewis	2
6	Eric Nally (as featuring)	2
6	Melle Mel (as featuring)	2
6	Kool Moe Dee (as featuring)	2
6	Grandmaster Caz (as featuring)	2
7	Calvin Harris	1
7	Disciples	1
7	Drake	1
7	Major Lazer	1
7	DJ Snake	1
7	MØ (as featuring)	1
7	One Direction	1

== See also ==
- 2015 in music
- List of number-one singles of 2015 (Australia)
