= List of number-one singles of 2015 (Australia) =

ARIA Charts number-one singles of 2015 < 2014 2016 >

Other Australian number-one charts of 2015
- albums
- urban singles
- dance singles
- club tracks
- digital tracks
- streaming tracks

Top Australian singles and albums of 2015
- Triple J Hottest 100
- top 25 singles
- top 25 albums

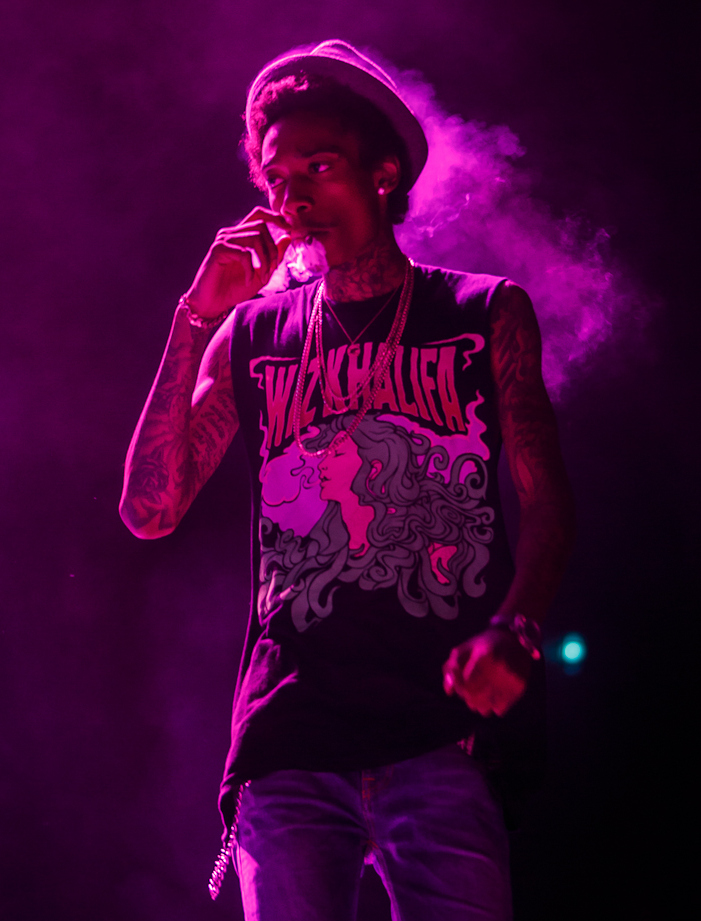
Wiz Khalifa earned his first number-one single, as did featured singer Charlie Puth, for "See You Again", topping the chart for six consecutive weeks to share the title of the year's longest-running number-one.

The ARIA Singles Chart ranks the best-performing singles in Australia. Its data, published by the Australian Recording Industry Association, is based collectively on each single's weekly physical and digital sales. In 2015, nineteen singles claimed the top spot, including Mark Ronson's "Uptown Funk", which started its peak position in 2014, and 23 acts achieved their first number-one single in Australia: Ronson, Omi, Felix Jaehn, Ellie Goulding, LunchMoney Lewis, Major Lazer, DJ Snake, MØ, Wiz Khalifa, Charlie Puth, Grace, G-Eazy, Kendrick Lamar, Conrad Sewell, Lost Frequencies, One Direction, Calvin Harris, Disciples, Justin Bieber, Eric Nally, Melle Mel, Kool Moe Dee and Grandmaster Caz.

Justin Bieber achieved two number-ones: "What Do You Mean?" (4 weeks) and "Love Yourself" (3 weeks), making him the longest-topping artist of 2015. For spending six consecutive weeks each at number-one, the longest-running number-one singles of the year were Wiz Khalifa and Charlie Puth's "See You Again" and Adele's "Hello". Ellie Goulding's "Love Me Like You Do", Meghan Trainor and John Legend's "Like I'm Gonna Lose You", Justin Bieber's "What Do You Mean?", and Macklemore & Ryan Lewis' "Downtown" shared the title of second longest-running number-one single of 2015, each spending four weeks on the top. Taylor Swift's "Bad Blood" featuring Kendrick Lamar topped the charts for three consecutive weeks, making it Lamar's first single to top the chart.

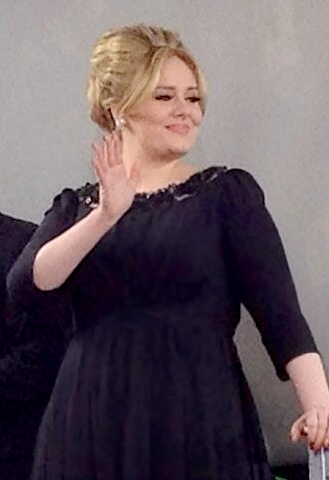
Adele's "Hello" also topped the chart for six consecutive weeks, becoming her second number-one after 2011's "Someone Like You".

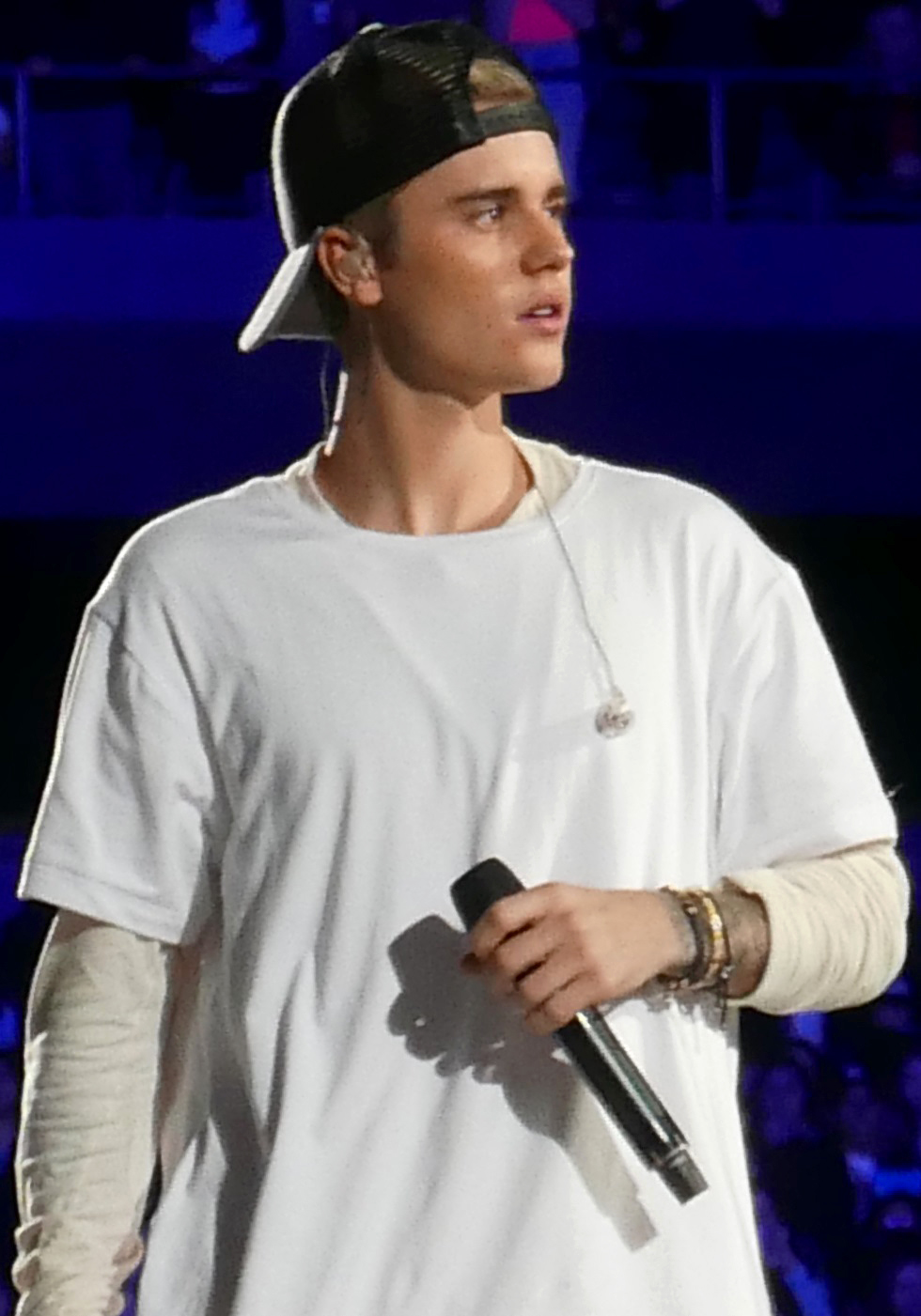
Justin Bieber achieved his first two number-one singles in late 2015: "What Do You Mean?" and "Love Yourself", with four and three weeks at number-one respectively, Bieber was the year's longest-topping artist.

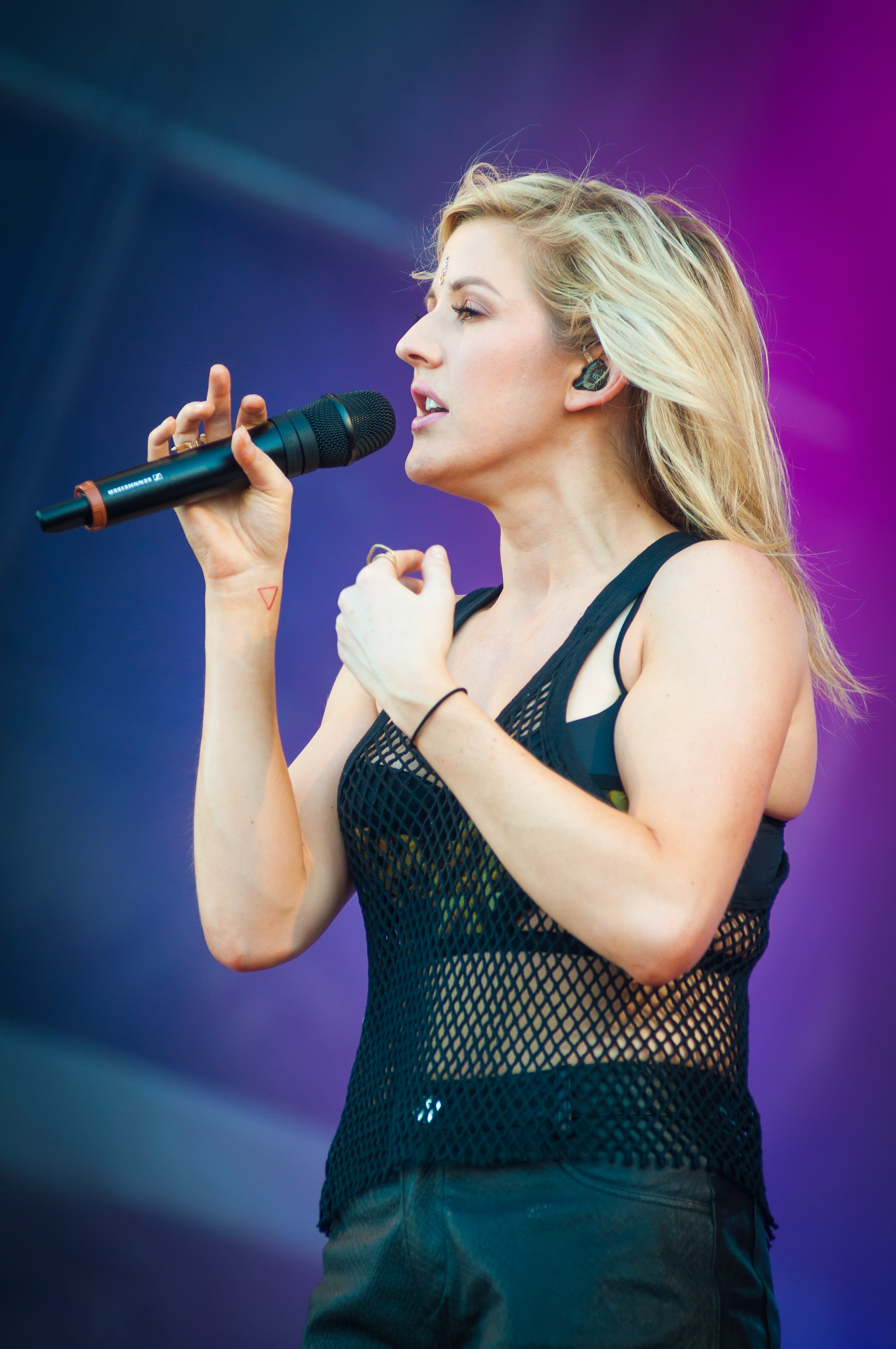
"Love Me Like You Do" was Ellie Goulding's first number-one, topping the chart for four consecutive weeks.

== Chart history ==
Key
The yellow background indicates the #1 song on ARIA's End of Year Singles Chart of 2015.

Date	Song	Artist(s)	Ref.
5 January	"Uptown Funk"	Mark Ronson featuring Bruno Mars	
12 January	"Uptown Funk"	Mark Ronson featuring Bruno Mars	
19 January	"Uptown Funk"	Mark Ronson featuring Bruno Mars	
26 January	"Cheerleader" (Felix Jaehn Remix)	Omi	
2 February	"Cheerleader" (Felix Jaehn Remix)	Omi	
9 February	"Cheerleader" (Felix Jaehn Remix)	Omi	
16 February	"FourFiveSeconds"	Rihanna, Kanye West and Paul McCartney	
23 February	"Love Me Like You Do"	Ellie Goulding	
2 March	"Love Me Like You Do"	Ellie Goulding	
9 March	"Love Me Like You Do"	Ellie Goulding	
16 March	"Love Me Like You Do"	Ellie Goulding	
23 March	"Bills"	LunchMoney Lewis	
30 March	"Bills"	LunchMoney Lewis	
6 April	"Lean On"	Major Lazer and DJ Snake featuring MØ	
13 April	"See You Again"	Wiz Khalifa featuring Charlie Puth	
20 April	"See You Again"	Wiz Khalifa featuring Charlie Puth	
27 April	"See You Again"	Wiz Khalifa featuring Charlie Puth	
4 May	"See You Again"	Wiz Khalifa featuring Charlie Puth	
11 May	"See You Again"	Wiz Khalifa featuring Charlie Puth	
18 May	"See You Again"	Wiz Khalifa featuring Charlie Puth	
25 May	"You Don't Own Me"	Grace featuring G-Eazy	
1 June	"Bad Blood"	Taylor Swift featuring Kendrick Lamar	
8 June	"Bad Blood"	Taylor Swift featuring Kendrick Lamar	
15 June	"Bad Blood"	Taylor Swift featuring Kendrick Lamar	
22 June	"Start Again"	Conrad Sewell	
29 June	"Like I'm Gonna Lose You"	Meghan Trainor featuring John Legend	
6 July	"Like I'm Gonna Lose You"	Meghan Trainor featuring John Legend	
13 July	"Like I'm Gonna Lose You"	Meghan Trainor featuring John Legend	
20 July	"Like I'm Gonna Lose You"	Meghan Trainor featuring John Legend	
27 July	"Are You with Me"	Lost Frequencies	
3 August	"Are You with Me"	Lost Frequencies	
10 August	"Drag Me Down"	One Direction	
17 August	"Wings"	Delta Goodrem	
24 August	"Wings"	Delta Goodrem	
31 August	"How Deep Is Your Love"	Calvin Harris and Disciples	
7 September	"What Do You Mean?"	Justin Bieber	
14 September	"What Do You Mean?"	Justin Bieber	
21 September	"What Do You Mean?"	Justin Bieber	
28 September	"What Do You Mean?"	Justin Bieber	
5 October	"Downtown"	Macklemore & Ryan Lewis featuring Eric Nally, Melle Mel, Kool Moe Dee and Grandmaster Caz	
12 October	"Downtown"	Macklemore & Ryan Lewis featuring Eric Nally, Melle Mel, Kool Moe Dee and Grandmaster Caz	
19 October	"Downtown"	Macklemore & Ryan Lewis featuring Eric Nally, Melle Mel, Kool Moe Dee and Grandmaster Caz	
26 October	"Downtown"	Macklemore & Ryan Lewis featuring Eric Nally, Melle Mel, Kool Moe Dee and Grandmaster Caz	
2 November	"Hello"	Adele	
9 November	"Hello"	Adele	
16 November	"Hello"	Adele	
23 November	"Hello"	Adele	
30 November	"Hello"	Adele	
7 December	"Hello"	Adele	
14 December	"Love Yourself"	Justin Bieber	
21 December	"Love Yourself"	Justin Bieber	
28 December	"Love Yourself"	Justin Bieber	

== Number-one artists ==
Position	Artist	Weeks at No. 1
1	Justin Bieber	7
2	Adele	6
2	Wiz Khalifa	6
2	Charlie Puth (as featuring)	6
3	Ellie Goulding	4
3	Meghan Trainor	4
3	John Legend (as featuring)	4
3	Macklemore & Ryan Lewis	4
3	Eric Nally (as featuring)	4
3	Melle Mel (as featuring)	4
3	Kool Moe Dee (as featuring)	4
3	Grandmaster Caz (as featuring)	4
4	Mark Ronson	3
4	Bruno Mars (as featuring)	3
4	OMI	3
4	Felix Jaehn	3
4	Taylor Swift	3
4	Kendrick Lamar (as featuring)	3
5	LunchMoney Lewis	2
5	Lost Frequencies	2
5	Delta Goodrem	2
6	Rihanna	1
6	Paul McCartney	1
6	Kanye West	1
6	Major Lazer	1
6	DJ Snake	1
6	MØ (as featuring)	1
6	Grace	1
6	G-Eazy (as featuring)	1
6	Conrad Sewell	1
6	One Direction	1
6	Calvin Harris	1
6	Disciples	1

== See also ==
- 2015 in music
- List of number-one albums of 2015 (Australia)
- List of Top 25 singles for 2015 in Australia
- List of top 10 singles in 2015 (Australia)
