= See You Again =

2015 single by Wiz Khalifa featuring Charlie Puth

Single by Wiz Khalifa featuring Charlie Puth

from the album Furious 7: Original Motion Picture Soundtrack
- Released: March 10, 2015
- Recorded: 2014
- Genre: Hip hop; pop rap
- Length: 3:50
- Label: Atlantic
- Songwriters: Cameron Thomaz; Charlie Puth; Justin Franks; Andrew Cedar; Dann Hume; Phoebe Cockburn; Joshua Karl Simon Hardy
- Producers: Charlie Puth; DJ Frank E; Andrew Cedar; Kevin Weaver; Mike Caren

Wiz Khalifa singles chronology
"You and Your Friends" (2014)	"See You Again" (2015)	"For Everybody" (2015)

Charlie Puth singles chronology
"Marvin Gaye" (2015)	"See You Again" (2015)	"One Call Away" (2015)

Music video
- "See You Again" on YouTube

"See You Again" is a song by American rapper Wiz Khalifa featuring American singer-songwriter Charlie Puth. Produced by Puth, DJ Frank E and Andrew Cedar, who also co-wrote the song with Khalifa, the song was commissioned for the soundtrack of the 2015 film Furious 7 as a tribute to Fast & Furious actor Paul Walker, who died in a single-vehicle crash on November 30, 2013. The song was released on March 10, 2015, before Furious 7 was released, as the soundtrack's lead single. It was later included as a bonus track on the international release of Puth's debut album, Nine Track Mind (2016).

"See You Again" became both artists' biggest single to date. It spent 12 non-consecutive weeks atop the US Billboard Hot 100, tying with Eminem's "Lose Yourself" for the second longest-running rap number-one single in the country behind Lil Nas X's "Old Town Road", and topped the UK Singles Chart for two consecutive weeks. It also reached number one in several other countries including Australia, Austria, Canada, Germany, Ireland, New Zealand and Switzerland. The song held the record for the most-streamed track in a single day on Spotify in the United States, until it was surpassed by One Direction's "Drag Me Down". It set the record for most streams in a single week worldwide, and in the United Kingdom also in a single week.

The music video was the most-viewed video on YouTube from July 10 to August 4, 2017. "See You Again" received three nominations at the 58th Annual Grammy Awards: Song of the Year, Best Pop Duo/Group Performance and Best Song Written for Visual Media. It was also shortlisted for the Song of the Year for the BBC Music Awards and was nominated for Best Original Song at the 73rd Golden Globe Awards. "See You Again" was the best selling-song of 2015 worldwide, with combined sales and track-equivalent streams of 20.9 million units according to IFPI. It is certified Diamond by the Recording Industry Association of America (RIAA), and is one of the most-streamed songs on Spotify ever, with over 2.5 billion streams.

== Writing and development ==
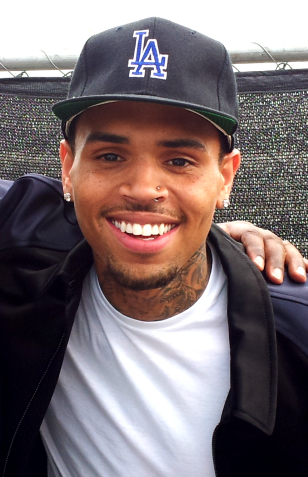
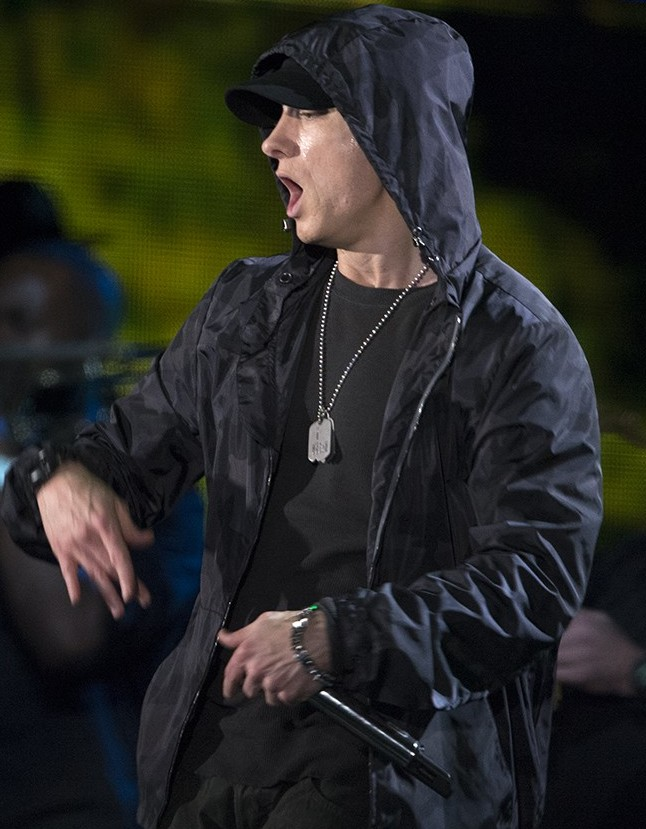
Chris Brown (left) and Eminem (right) were two of the artists originally enlisted to perform the song.

"See You Again" was written by DJ Frank E, Charlie Puth, Wiz Khalifa, Andrew Cedar, Dann Hume, Phoebe Cockburn, and Joshua Karl Simon Hardy. It was produced by DJ Frank E, Charlie Puth, Andrew Cedar, Kevin Weaver, and Mike Caren with mixing provided by Manny Marroquin. Frank E and Puth were approached by their publishing company, Artist Publishing Group, to develop a melody that could pay tribute to actor Paul Walker for the film Furious 7 (2015); Artist Publishing Group then set up a first-time studio session for Puth with DJ Frank E at a studio in Los Angeles.

Puth, talking about the first studio session for the song, said that when he went to the studio "[the producers] were working on this song" and it already had the "See You Again" chords, but it was a "synthy" production for a "dance song", and he later suggested the idea of the song being a piano ballad instead. Puth said that he became emotionally attached while writing the lyrics of the track, recalling Vail Cerullo, a friend of Puth's from his time at Berklee College of Music, who died in a motorcycle accident in 2012. Puth and DJ Frank E's output from the session was well received by Furious 7 filmmakers, Universal Pictures, and Atlantic. As a result, the track was further commissioned to include rapped verses based on the subject of family, combined with Puth's vocals and a piano melody. The song then went through an extensive note-giving and production process. Before choosing Wiz Khalifa's version, several other rappers were offered to record the rapped parts of the song, including Eminem, 50 Cent and Tyga. Puth said that he was initially reluctant to let the film's soundtrack label, Atlantic Records, choose his vocals for the song. In an interview with the Los Angeles Times, Puth recalled, "It just seemed to occur from out of nowhere. And basically 10 minutes later Justin (DJ Frank E) and I wrote it, we sent it off, and I thought we'd never hear about it again". Puth revealed on The Howard Stern Show that Atlantic originally wanted to get a more established singer to sing his part, having Chris Brown, Sam Smith, Jason Derulo and others recording their own versions of the song's chorus. Puth stated that also British singer Adele "wanted to cut it". According to Puth, "none of the vocals had the [right] feeling ... What I was singing about specifically, you just couldn't hear it in their voice. I think Chris Brown got the closest to it, but they ended up, lucky me, going with my vocal".

The song was chosen to be played at the end of the film. After Brian O'Conner's retirement send-off, the song can be heard as Brian and Dominic Toretto drive on a mountain road, parting ways as they reach a fork.

== Composition ==
"See You Again" is a hip-hop and pop-rap ballad. It is written in the key of B♭ major with a time signature of 4/4, and has a tempo of 80 beats per minute (andante/andantino). The chorus of the song has 180 background vocal layers.

== Commercial performance ==
=== North America ===
In the United States, "See You Again" debuted on the Billboard Hot 100 and Hot R&B/Hip-Hop Songs charts dated March 19, 2015, at number 100 and number 29 respectively, with first-week sales of 25,000 copies. On the chart issued for April 18, 2015, the song climbed from number 84 to number ten on the Billboard Hot 100, selling 168,000 copies as the chart's "Digital Gainer" that week. Its climb into the top ten was the chart's biggest since Katy Perry's "Roar" (2013). In its fifth week, "See You Again" sold 464,000 copies and rose from number ten to number one on the Billboard Hot 100. The song marked Khalifa's second number one on the chart, following "Black and Yellow" (2011), and Puth's first. It topped the Billboard Hot 100 chart for 12 non-consecutive weeks. After its 12th week it was finally knocked off the top spot by Omi's hit, "Cheerleader". It is one of 33 songs to reach number one for at least 10 weeks on the Billboard Hot 100. The song also topped the Mainstream Top 40 and Rhythmic charts for four weeks and three weeks respectively. The song also topped Hot Rap Songs and Hot R&B Hip Hip Songs for 14 weeks each. As of July 7, 2016, "See You Again" has sold a total of 4,122,938 copies in the United States. The song would later be certified 14xPlatinum by the Recording Industry Association of America (RIAA) for equivalent sales of 14 million units in the United States.

The song holds the record for the most-streamed track in a single day on Spotify in the United States. It set the record for most streams in a single week worldwide during April 6 to April 12 (streamed 21.9 million times), and in the United Kingdom in a single week (streamed 3.72 million times from April 20 to April 26, 2015), which was broken by Justin Bieber's "What Do You Mean?" (streamed 3.87 million times from September 17 to September 23, 2015).

=== Europe and Oceania ===
"See You Again" debuted at number 22 on the UK Singles Chart issued for April 12, 2015, on streaming alone. It registered 1.8 million streams in the United Kingdom that week. Following its digital release, the song climbed to number one on the chart dated April 19, 2015. It sold 193,000 units that week, becoming the fastest-selling single in the United Kingdom of 2015. The song also broke the streaming record in the United Kingdom that week with a total of 3.68 million streams that week. It marked Khalifa's second number one on the chart—following his feature on Maroon 5's "Payphone" (2012)—and Puth's first. "See You Again" sold 142,000 units during its first week at number one, and broke its own streaming record with 3.72 million streams that week. Omi's "Cheerleader" replaced "See You Again" at number one the following week, selling approximately 1,000 units more than "See You Again" at number two.

In New Zealand, "See You Again" debuted at number 34 on the New Zealand Singles Chart dated March 30, 2015. It topped the chart in its third week, becoming Khalifa and Puth's first number one single in the country. In Australia, "See You Again" rose from number 59 to number one on the Australian Singles Chart issued for April 11, 2015, marking Khalifa and Puth's first number one hit on the chart. The song's climb to number one was the largest in Australian Singles Chart history.

== Music video ==
The music video for "See You Again" was directed by Marc Klasfeld. It was uploaded to YouTube on April 6, 2015.

=== Background ===
The "See You Again" music video was the most-viewed video on YouTube from July 10 to August 4, 2017, and the most-liked video on the site from August 27, 2016, to July 25, 2017. As of October 15, 2026, it has received over 7.1 billion views and over 47.1 million likes, making it the site's eight most-viewed and third most-liked video. It was the second video ever to record two billion and three billion views, the third video ever to reach four billion views and the fourth video ever to reach five billion views.

=== Synopsis ===
The video begins with a shot of a cliff top at sunset, followed by Khalifa walking down a highway road. Puth is then shown singing the chorus whilst sitting at, and playing, a piano located between two cars. Khalifa's rap verses and Puth singing the second chorus and bridge are interspersed with footage from Furious 7. After the bridge, the final movie scene shows Dominic Toretto (Vin Diesel) and Brian O'Conner (Cody Walker, filling in for his brother, Paul) driving together, pulled over in their cars and smiling at each other one last time before driving away on separate roads into the sunset. After the camera pans up into the sky, the screen turns white, the words "For Paul" appear on screen and the video ends.

=== Reception ===
The video was the most viewed video on YouTube from July 10, 2017, when it surpassed "Gangnam Style" by Psy, to August 4 of that year, when it was surpassed by "Despacito" by Luis Fonsi featuring Daddy Yankee. At 25 days, this is the shortest reign for this title since 2008. The video was nominated for Best Hip-Hop Video and Best Collaboration at the 2015 MTV Video Music Awards, but lost both. On August 27, 2016, the music video surpassed "Gangnam Style" as YouTube's most liked video of all time, after "Gangnam Style" held the record for almost 4 years.

== Live performances ==
Khalifa and Puth performed "See You Again" live on The Tonight Show Starring Jimmy Fallon in March 2015 and on an episode of Saturday Night Live in May 2015. Diesel also performed the song live as a tribute to Paul Walker during the 2015 MTV Movie Awards. Khalifa and Puth reprised the song in a performance on The Ellen DeGeneres Show in April 2015, then at the 2015 Billboard Music Awards, with Lindsey Stirling on violin, and they also performed the song at the 2016 Kids' Choice Awards.

On January 31, 2020, Khalifa and Puth performed "See You Again" live during halftime of a Portland Trail Blazers-Los Angeles Lakers game at the Staples Center in Los Angeles, as a tribute to Kobe Bryant, his daughter Gianna and seven other victims of the Calabasas helicopter crash. On January 15, 2024, Puth and The War and Treaty performed "See You Again" along with "I'll Be There for You" at the 75th Primetime Emmy Awards, during the In Memoriam segment.

== Awards and nominations ==
Year	Award	Category	Result
2015	American Music Awards	Song of the Year	Nominated
2015	American Music Awards	Collaboration of the Year	Nominated
2015	Hollywood Music in Media Awards	Song – Feature Film	Won
2015	MTV Video Music Awards	Best Hip-Hop Video	Nominated
2015	MTV Video Music Awards	Best Collaboration	Nominated
2015	Teen Choice Awards	Choice R&B/Hip-Hop Song	Won
2015	Teen Choice Awards	Choice Collaboration	Nominated
2015	Teen Choice Awards	Choice Song from a Movie or TV Show	Won
2015	Hollywood Film Awards	Hollywood Song Award	Won
2015	BBC Music Awards	Song of the Year	Nominated
2016	Grammy Awards	Song of the Year	Nominated
2016	Grammy Awards	Best Pop Duo/Group Performance	Nominated
2016	Grammy Awards	Best Song Written for Visual Media	Nominated
2016	Critics' Choice Movie Awards	Best Song	Won
2016	Golden Globe Awards	Best Original Song	Nominated
2016	Nickelodeon Kids' Choice Awards	Favorite Collaboration	Won
2016	Black Reel Awards	Best Original or Adapted Song	Won
2016	iHeartRadio Music Awards	Best Lyrics	Nominated
2016	iHeartRadio Music Awards	Best Collaboration	Nominated
2016	iHeartRadio Music Awards	Best Song from a Movie	Nominated
2016	ASCAP Pop Music Awards	Most Performed Songs	Won

== Track listing ==
Digital download
No.	Title	Length
1.	"See You Again (Extended)" (featuring Charlie Puth)	5:48

== Credits and personnel ==
- Andrew Cedar – songwriter, producer
- DJ Frank E (Justin Franks) – songwriter, producer
- Charlie Puth – songwriter, vocals, producer
- Brian Tyler – string arranger, conductor
- Wiz Khalifa (Cameron Thomaz) – songwriter, vocals
- Annie & Chloe – edited version, vocals, producers
- Dann Hume – songwriter
- Phoebe Cockburn – songwriter
- Joshua Karl Simon Hardy – songwriter
- Kevin Weaver – producer
- Mike Caren – producer

Credits adapted from Apple Music and AllMusic.

== Charts ==
=== Weekly charts ===
Weekly chart performance for "See You Again"
Chart (2015)	Peak position
Australia (ARIA)	1
Austria (Ö3 Austria Top 40)	1
Belgium (Ultratop 50 Flanders)	1
Belgium (Ultratop 50 Wallonia)	2
Brazil (Billboard Hot 100)	38
Canada Hot 100 (Billboard)	1
Canada CHR/Top 40 (Billboard)	1
Canada Hot AC (Billboard)	5
CIS Airplay (TopHit)	1
Colombia (National-Report Top Anglo)	1
Czech Republic Airplay (ČNS IFPI)	2
Czech Republic Singles Digital (ČNS IFPI)	1
Denmark (Tracklisten)	1
Europe (Euro Digital Songs)	1
Finland (Suomen virallinen lista)	1
France (SNEP)	2
Germany (GfK)	1
Greece Digital Songs (Billboard)	1
Hungary (Rádiós Top 40)	4
Hungary (Single Top 40)	1
Hungary (Stream Top 40)	1
Ireland (IRMA)	1
Israel International Airplay (Media Forest)	1
Italy (FIMI)	1
Japan Hot 100 (Billboard)	7
Lebanon (Lebanese Top 20)	1
Luxembourg Digital Song Sales (Billboard)	1
Mexico Anglo (Monitor Latino)	1
Mexico (Billboard Mexican Airplay)	1
Netherlands (Dutch Top 40)	3
Netherlands (Single Top 100)	3
New Zealand (Recorded Music NZ)	1
Norway (VG-lista)	1
Poland Airplay (ZPAV)	4
Portugal Digital Song Sales (Billboard)	1
Romania (Airplay 100)	1
Russia Airplay (Tophit)	3
Scottish Singles Sales (Official Charts)	1
Slovakia Airplay (ČNS IFPI)	5
Slovakia Singles Digital (ČNS IFPI)	1
South Africa Airplay (EMA)	1
South Korea (Gaon Music Chart)	32
Spain (Promusicae)	4
Sweden (Sverigetopplistan)	1
Switzerland (Schweizer Hitparade)	1
UK Singles (Official Charts)	1
UK Hip Hop/R&B (Official Charts)	1
US Billboard Hot 100	1
US Adult Contemporary (Billboard)	13
US Adult Pop Airplay (Billboard)	2
US Dance Airplay (Billboard)	3
US Hot R&B/Hip-Hop Songs (Billboard)	1
US Pop Airplay (Billboard)	1
US Rhythmic Airplay (Billboard)	1

=== Year-end charts ===
2015 year-end chart performance for "See You Again"
Chart (2015)	Position
Australia (ARIA)	3
Australia Urban (ARIA)	2
Austria (Ö3 Austria Top 40)	6
Belgium (Ultratop Flanders)	9
Belgium (Ultratop Wallonia)	20
Brazil (Crowley)	76
Canada (Canadian Hot 100)	4
CIS (Tophit)	20
Denmark (Tracklisten)	4
France (SNEP)	8
Germany (Official German Charts)	9
Hungary (Rádiós Top 40)	60
Hungary (Single Top 40)	14
Israel (Media Forest)	11
Italy (FIMI)	8
Japan (Japan Hot 100)	19
Netherlands (Dutch Top 40)	16
Netherlands (Single Top 100)	12
New Zealand (Recorded Music NZ)	3
Russia Airplay (Tophit)	19
Slovenia (SloTop50)	36
Spain (PROMUSICAE)	16
Sweden (Sverigetopplistan)	4
Switzerland (Schweizer Hitparade)	5
Ukraine Airplay (Tophit)	159
UK Singles (Official Charts Company)	5
US Billboard Hot 100	3
US Adult Contemporary (Billboard)	23
US Adult Top 40 (Billboard)	15
US Dance/Mix Show Airplay (Billboard)	26
US Hot R&B/Hip-Hop Songs (Billboard)	1
US Mainstream Top 40 (Billboard)	7
US Rhythmic (Billboard)	8

2016 year-end chart performance for "See You Again"
Chart (2016)	Position
Australia Urban (ARIA)	22
Brazil (Brasil Hot 100)	11
Canada (Canadian Hot 100)	83
France (SNEP)	155
Japan (Japan Hot 100)	59
US Billboard Hot 100	99

=== Decade-end charts ===
2010s-end chart performance for "See You Again"
Chart (2010–19)	Position
Australia (ARIA)	74
UK Singles (Official Charts Company)	68
US Billboard Hot 100	25
US Hot R&B/Hip-Hop Songs (Billboard)	23

=== All-time charts ===
All-time chart performance for "See You Again"
Chart (1958-2018)	Position
US Billboard Hot 100	103

== Certifications ==
Certifications and sales for "See You Again"
Region	Certification	Certified units/sales
Australia (ARIA)	7× Platinum	490,000^{‡}
Austria (IFPI Austria)	2× Platinum	60,000^{‡}
Belgium (BRMA)	2× Platinum	40,000^{‡}
Canada (Music Canada)	Diamond	800,000^{‡}
Denmark (IFPI Danmark)	4× Platinum	360,000^{‡}
France (SNEP)	Gold	75,000^{*}
Germany (BVMI)	Diamond	1,000,000^{‡}
Italy (FIMI)	5× Platinum	250,000^{‡}
Japan (RIAJ)	Platinum	250,000^{*}
Mexico (AMPROFON)	Platinum	60,000^{*}
Netherlands (NVPI)	Platinum	30,000^{‡}
New Zealand (RMNZ)	6× Platinum	180,000^{‡}
Norway (IFPI Norway)	5× Platinum	200,000^{‡}
Poland (ZPAV)	4× Platinum	200,000^{‡}
Portugal (AFP)	Platinum	20,000^{‡}
South Korea	—	2,500,000
Spain (Promusicae)	2× Platinum	80,000^{‡}
Sweden (GLF)	3× Platinum	120,000^{‡}
Switzerland (IFPI Switzerland)	2× Platinum	60,000^{‡}
United Kingdom (BPI)	4× Platinum	2,400,000^{‡}
United States (RIAA)	16× Platinum	16,000,000^{‡}
Streaming
Japan (RIAJ)	2× Platinum	200,000,000^{†}
^{*} Sales figures based on certification alone.^{‡} Sales+streaming figures based on certification alone.^{†} Streaming-only figures based on certification alone.

== Release history ==
Release dates for "See You Again"
Country	Date	Format	Label	Ref.
United States	March 10, 2015	Digital download	Atlantic	
Worldwide	April 3, 2015	Digital download	Atlantic	
United States	April 7, 2015	Contemporary hit radio	Atlantic	
United Kingdom	April 12, 2015	Digital download	Atlantic	

== Cover versions ==
In 2026, Italian film score composer Giacomo Bucci released an orchestral reinterpretation of "See You Again" as part of his album Mainstream Overtures, applying his cinematic compositional approach to the song.

== See also ==
- List of best-selling singles
- List of Airplay 100 number ones of the 2010s
- List of Billboard Hot 100 number-one singles of 2015
- List of number-one digital songs of 2015 (U.S.)
- List of number-one R&B/hip-hop songs of 2015 (U.S.)
- List of Billboard Mainstream Top 40 number-one songs of 2015
- List of Billboard Rhythmic number-one songs of the 2010s
- List of Hot 100 Airplay number-one singles of the 2010s
- List of number-one singles of 2015 (Australia)
- List of number-one digital tracks of 2015 (Australia)
- List of number-one streaming tracks of 2015 (Australia)
- List of number-one urban singles of 2015 (Australia)
- List of number-one hits of 2015 (Austria)
- List of Ultratop 50 Flanders number-one singles of 2015
- List of Canadian Hot 100 number-one singles of 2015
- List of number-one hits of 2015 (Denmark)
- List of number-one singles of 2015 (Finland)
- List of number-one hits of 2015 (Germany)
- List of number-one singles of 2015 (Ireland)
- List of number-one hits of 2015 (Italy)
- List of Mexico Airplay number-one singles from the 2010s
- List of Mexico Ingles Airplay singles of the 2010s
- List of number-one singles from the 2010s (New Zealand)
- List of number-one songs in Norway
- List of Romandie Charts number-one singles of 2015
- Lists of Scottish number-one singles of 2015
- List of number-one singles of 2015 (South Africa)
- List of number-one singles of the 2010s (Sweden)
- List of number-one hits of 2015 (Switzerland)
- List of UK Singles Chart number ones of the 2010s
- List of UK R&B Singles Chart number ones of 2015
- List of most-liked YouTube videos
- List of most-viewed YouTube videos
- List of most-streamed songs on Spotify
- List of most-streamed songs in the United Kingdom
