= List of top 25 singles for 2015 in Australia =

Top 25 singles of 2015 < 2014 2016 >

Other Australian top charts for 2015
- top 25 albums
- Triple J Hottest 100

Australian number-one charts of 2015
- albums
- singles
- urban singles
- dance singles
- club tracks
- digital tracks
- streaming tracks

The following lists the top 25 singles of 2015 in Australia from the Australian Recording Industry Association (ARIA) end-of-year singles chart.

Mark Ronson's track "Uptown Funk", featuring Bruno Mars, was the highest selling single in Australia in 2015 with a sales accreditation of nine times platinum. It spent two weeks at number one, 15 weeks in the top 10, and did not leave the top 100 for the entire year.

Sia's "Elastic Heart" was the highest selling Australian song.

| # | Title | Artist | Highest pos. reached |
|---|---|---|---|
| 1 | "Uptown Funk" | Mark Ronson feat. Bruno Mars | 1 |
| 2 | "Cheerleader" (Felix Jaehn Remix) | Omi | 1 |
| 3 | "See You Again" | Wiz Khalifa feat. Charlie Puth | 1 |
| 4 | "Take Me To Church" | Hozier | 2 |
| 5 | "Hello" | Adele | 1 |
| 6 | "Lean On" | Major Lazer & DJ Snake feat. MØ | 1 |
| 7 | "Love Me Like You Do" | Ellie Goulding | 1 |
| 8 | "Shut Up + Dance" | Walk the Moon | 3 |
| 9 | "What Do You Mean?" | Justin Bieber | 1 |
| 10 | "FourFiveSeconds" | Rihanna, Paul McCartney & Kanye West | 1 |
| 11 | "Downtown" | Macklemore & Ryan Lewis feat. Eric Nally, Melle Mel, Kool Moe Dee, and Grandmaster Caz | 1 |
| 12 | "Can't Feel My Face" | The Weeknd | 2 |
| 13 | "Sugar" | Maroon 5 | 6 |
| 14 | "Elastic Heart" | Sia | 5 |
| 15 | "Thinking Out Loud" | Ed Sheeran | 1 |
| 16 | "Sorry" | Justin Bieber | 2 |
| 17 | "Where Are Ü Now" | Jack Ü feat. Justin Bieber | 3 |
| 18 | "Bad Blood" | Taylor Swift (feat. Kendrick Lamar) | 1 |
| 19 | "Hold Back the River" | James Bay | 4 |
| 20 | "The Hills" | The Weeknd | 3 |
| 21 | "Fight Song" | Rachel Platten | 2 |
| 22 | "Do You Remember" | Jarryd James | 2 |
| 23 | "Like I'm Gonna Lose You" | Meghan Trainor (feat. John Legend) | 1 |
| 24 | "Want to Want Me" | Jason Derulo | 4 |
| 25 | "Love Yourself" | Justin Bieber | 1 |

== See also ==
- List of number-one singles of 2015 (Australia)
- List of Australian chart achievements and milestones
