= List of number-one urban singles of 2015 (Australia) =

ARIA Charts number-one urban singles of 2015 < 2014 2016 >

Other Australian number-one charts of 2015
- albums
- singles
- dance singles
- club tracks
- digital tracks
- streaming tracks

Top Australian singles and albums of 2015
- Triple J Hottest 100
- top 25 singles
- top 25 albums

The ARIA Urban Chart is a chart that ranks the best-performing Urban tracks singles in Australia. It is published by the Australian Recording Industry Association (ARIA), an organisation that collects music data for the weekly ARIA Charts. To be eligible to appear on the chart, the recording must be a single of predominantly urban nature.

== Chart history ==
Issue date	Song	Artist(s)	Reference
5 January	"Uptown Funk"	Mark Ronson featuring Bruno Mars	
12 January	"Uptown Funk"	Mark Ronson featuring Bruno Mars	
19 January	"Uptown Funk"	Mark Ronson featuring Bruno Mars	
26 January	"Uptown Funk"	Mark Ronson featuring Bruno Mars	
2 February	"Uptown Funk"	Mark Ronson featuring Bruno Mars	
9 February	"Uptown Funk"	Mark Ronson featuring Bruno Mars	
16 February	"FourFiveSeconds"	Rihanna, Kanye West and Paul McCartney	
23 February	"FourFiveSeconds"	Rihanna, Kanye West and Paul McCartney	
2 March	"FourFiveSeconds"	Rihanna, Kanye West and Paul McCartney	
9 March	"FourFiveSeconds"	Rihanna, Kanye West and Paul McCartney	
16 March	"FourFiveSeconds"	Rihanna, Kanye West and Paul McCartney	
23 March	"Bills"	LunchMoney Lewis	
30 March	"Bills"	LunchMoney Lewis	
6 April	"Do You Remember"	Jarryd James	
13 April	"See You Again"	Wiz Khalifa featuring Charlie Puth	
20 April	"See You Again"	Wiz Khalifa featuring Charlie Puth	
27 April	"See You Again"	Wiz Khalifa featuring Charlie Puth	
4 May	"See You Again"	Wiz Khalifa featuring Charlie Puth	
11 May	"See You Again"	Wiz Khalifa featuring Charlie Puth	
18 May	"See You Again"	Wiz Khalifa featuring Charlie Puth	
25 May	"See You Again"	Wiz Khalifa featuring Charlie Puth	
1 June	"See You Again"	Wiz Khalifa featuring Charlie Puth	
8 June	"See You Again"	Wiz Khalifa featuring Charlie Puth	
15 June	"See You Again"	Wiz Khalifa featuring Charlie Puth	
22 June	"See You Again"	Wiz Khalifa featuring Charlie Puth	
29 June	"See You Again"	Wiz Khalifa featuring Charlie Puth	
6 July	"Can't Feel My Face"	The Weeknd	
13 July	"Can't Feel My Face"	The Weeknd	
20 July	"Can't Feel My Face"	The Weeknd	
27 July	"Can't Feel My Face"	The Weeknd	
3 August	"Can't Feel My Face"	The Weeknd	
10 August	"Can't Feel My Face"	The Weeknd	
17 August	"Can't Feel My Face"	The Weeknd	
24 August	"Can't Feel My Face"	The Weeknd	
31 August	"Can't Feel My Face"	The Weeknd	
7 September	"The Fix"	Nelly featuring Jeremih	
14 September	"Downtown"	Macklemore & Ryan Lewis featuring Eric Nally, Melle Mel, Kool Moe Dee & Grandmaster Caz	
21 September	"Downtown"	Macklemore & Ryan Lewis featuring Eric Nally, Melle Mel, Kool Moe Dee & Grandmaster Caz	
28 September	"Downtown"	Macklemore & Ryan Lewis featuring Eric Nally, Melle Mel, Kool Moe Dee & Grandmaster Caz	
5 October	"Downtown"	Macklemore & Ryan Lewis featuring Eric Nally, Melle Mel, Kool Moe Dee & Grandmaster Caz	
12 October	"Downtown"	Macklemore & Ryan Lewis featuring Eric Nally, Melle Mel, Kool Moe Dee & Grandmaster Caz	
19 October	"Downtown"	Macklemore & Ryan Lewis featuring Eric Nally, Melle Mel, Kool Moe Dee & Grandmaster Caz	
26 October	"Downtown"	Macklemore & Ryan Lewis featuring Eric Nally, Melle Mel, Kool Moe Dee & Grandmaster Caz	
2 November	"Hotline Bling"	Drake	
9 November	"The Hills"	The Weeknd	
16 November	"The Hills"	The Weeknd	
23 November	"Downtown"	Macklemore & Ryan Lewis featuring Eric Nally, Melle Mel, Kool Moe Dee & Grandmaster Caz	
30 November	"The Hills"	The Weeknd	
7 December	"Downtown"	Macklemore & Ryan Lewis featuring Eric Nally, Melle Mel, Kool Moe Dee & Grandmaster Caz	
14 December	"Higher"	Hilltop Hoods featuring James Chatburn	
21 December	"Downtown"	Macklemore & Ryan Lewis featuring Eric Nally, Melle Mel, Kool Moe Dee & Grandmaster Caz	
28 December	"Downtown"	Macklemore & Ryan Lewis featuring Eric Nally, Melle Mel, Kool Moe Dee & Grandmaster Caz	

== Number-one artists ==
Position	Artist	Weeks at No. 1
1	The Weeknd	12
1	Wiz Khalifa	12
1	Charlie Puth (as featuring)	12
2	Macklemore & Ryan Lewis	11
2	Eric Nally (as featuring)	11
2	Melle Mel (as featuring)	11
2	Kool Moe Dee (as featuring)	11
2	Grandmaster Caz (as featuring)	11
3	Mark Ronson	6
3	Bruno Mars (as featuring)	6
4	Rihanna	5
4	Kanye West	5
4	Paul McCartney	5
5	LunchMoney Lewis	2
6	Drake	1
6	Hilltop Hoods	1
6	James Chatburn (as featuring)	1
6	Jarryd James	1
6	Nelly	1
6	Jeremih (as featuring)	1

== See also ==
- 2015 in music
- List of number-one singles of 2015 (Australia)
