= List of number-one streaming tracks of 2015 (Australia) =

ARIA Charts number-one streaming tracks of 2015 < 2014 2016 >

Other Australian number-one charts of 2015
- albums
- singles
- urban singles
- dance singles
- club tracks
- digital tracks

Top Australian singles and albums of 2015
- Triple J Hottest 100
- top 25 singles
- top 25 albums

The ARIA Streaming Chart ranks the best-performing streaming tracks of Australia. It is published by Australian Recording Industry Association (ARIA), an organisation who collects music data for the weekly ARIA Charts.

== Chart history ==
Key
†	Indicates number-one Streaming single of 2015

Issue date	Song	Artist(s)	Reference
5 January	"Uptown Funk"	Mark Ronson featuring Bruno Mars	
12 January	"Uptown Funk"	Mark Ronson featuring Bruno Mars	
19 January	"Uptown Funk"	Mark Ronson featuring Bruno Mars	
26 January	"Uptown Funk"	Mark Ronson featuring Bruno Mars	
2 February	"Uptown Funk"	Mark Ronson featuring Bruno Mars	
9 February	"Uptown Funk"	Mark Ronson featuring Bruno Mars	
16 February	"Uptown Funk"	Mark Ronson featuring Bruno Mars	
23 February	"Uptown Funk"	Mark Ronson featuring Bruno Mars	
2 March	"Love Me like You Do"	Ellie Goulding	
9 March	"Love Me like You Do"	Ellie Goulding	
16 March	"Love Me like You Do"	Ellie Goulding	
23 March	"Love Me like You Do"	Ellie Goulding	
30 March	"Uptown Funk"	Mark Ronson featuring Bruno Mars	
6 April	"Lean On"†	Major Lazer & DJ Snake featuring MØ	
13 April	"Lean On"†	Major Lazer & DJ Snake featuring MØ	
20 April	"See You Again"	Wiz Khalifa featuring Charlie Puth	
27 April	"See You Again"	Wiz Khalifa featuring Charlie Puth	
4 May	"See You Again"	Wiz Khalifa featuring Charlie Puth	
11 May	"See You Again"	Wiz Khalifa featuring Charlie Puth	
18 May	"See You Again"	Wiz Khalifa featuring Charlie Puth	
25 May	"Lean On"†	Major Lazer & DJ Snake featuring MØ	
1 June	"Lean On"†	Major Lazer & DJ Snake featuring MØ	
8 June	"Lean On"†	Major Lazer & DJ Snake featuring MØ	
15 June	"Lean On"†	Major Lazer & DJ Snake featuring MØ	
22 June	"Lean On"†	Major Lazer & DJ Snake featuring MØ	
29 June	"Lean On"†	Major Lazer & DJ Snake featuring MØ	
6 July	"Lean On"†	Major Lazer & DJ Snake featuring MØ	
13 July	"Lean On"†	Major Lazer & DJ Snake featuring MØ	
20 July	"Can't Feel My Face"	The Weeknd	
27 July	"Can't Feel My Face"	The Weeknd	
3 August	"Can't Feel My Face"	The Weeknd	
10 August	"Can't Feel My Face"	The Weeknd	
17 August	"Can't Feel My Face"	The Weeknd	
24 August	"Can't Feel My Face"	The Weeknd	
31 August	"Can't Feel My Face"	The Weeknd	
7 September	"What Do You Mean?"	Justin Bieber	
14 September	"What Do You Mean?"	Justin Bieber	
21 September	"What Do You Mean?"	Justin Bieber	
28 September	"What Do You Mean?"	Justin Bieber	
5 October	"What Do You Mean?"	Justin Bieber	
12 October	"What Do You Mean?"	Justin Bieber	
19 October	"What Do You Mean?"	Justin Bieber	
26 October	"What Do You Mean?"	Justin Bieber	
2 November	"Hotline Bling"	Drake	
9 November	"Sorry"	Justin Bieber	
16 November	"Sorry"	Justin Bieber	
23 November	"Sorry"	Justin Bieber	
30 November	"Love Yourself"	Justin Bieber	
7 December	"Love Yourself"	Justin Bieber	
14 December	"Love Yourself"	Justin Bieber	
21 December	"Love Yourself"	Justin Bieber	
28 December	"Love Yourself"	Justin Bieber	

== Number-one artists ==
Position	Artist	Weeks at No. 1
1	Justin Bieber	16
2	Major Lazer	10
2	DJ Snake	10
2	MØ (as featuring)	10
3	Mark Ronson	9
3	Bruno Mars (as featuring)	9
4	The Weeknd	7
5	Wiz Khalifa	5
5	Charlie Puth (as featuring)	5
6	Ellie Goulding	4
7	Drake	1

== See also ==
- 2015 in music
- List of number-one singles of 2015 (Australia)
