= List of number-one albums of 2015 (Australia) =

ARIA Charts number-one albums of 2015 < 2014 2016 >

Other Australian number-one charts of 2015
- singles
- urban singles
- dance singles
- club tracks
- digital tracks
- streaming tracks

Top Australian singles and albums of 2015
- Triple J Hottest 100
- top 25 singles
- top 25 albums

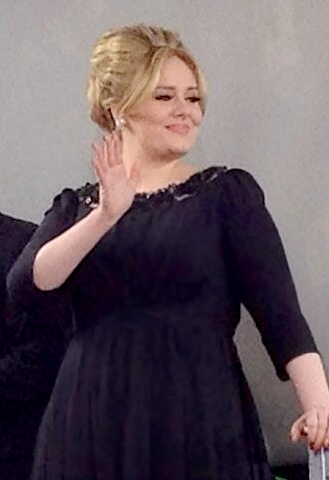
Adele's 25 spent the longest uninterrupted time as the number-one album: the final five weeks of 2015.

The ARIA Albums Chart ranks the best-performing albums and extended plays (EPs) in Australia. Its data, published by the Australian Recording Industry Association, is based collectively on each album and EP's weekly physical and digital sales. In 2015, 31 albums claimed the top spot, including Taylor Swift's 1989, which started its peak position in 2014, and thirteen acts achieved their first number-one album or EP in Australia: Meghan Trainor, Kendrick Lamar, Lee Kernaghan, Sam Smith, Hermitude, Tame Impala, Northlane, Dr. Dre, Bullet for My Valentine, The Weeknd, Troye Sivan, Parkway Drive and the Royal Philharmonic Orchestra.

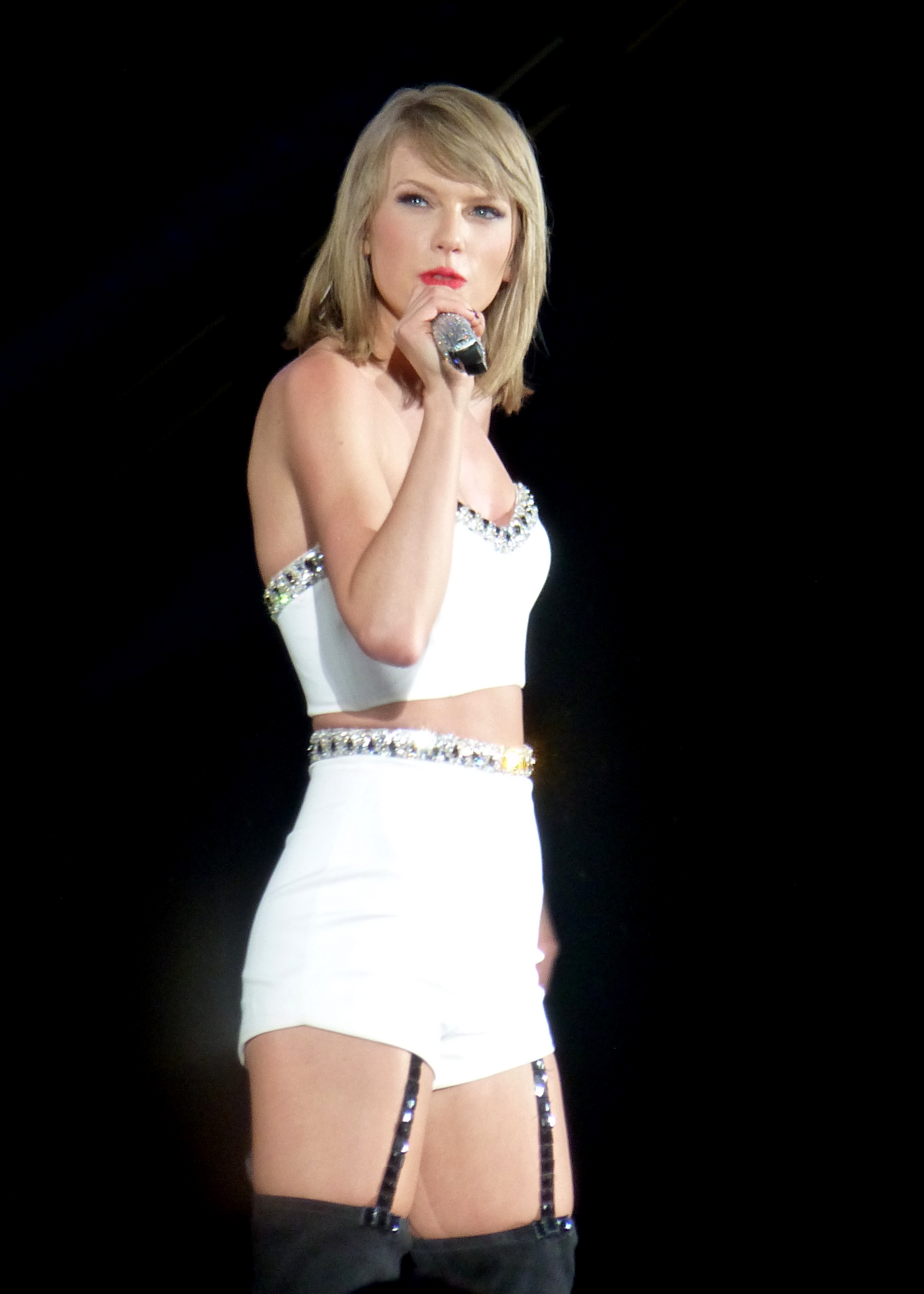
Doubling its number of weeks at number-one in 2014, Taylor Swift's 1989 also spent five non-consecutive weeks at number-one in 2015.

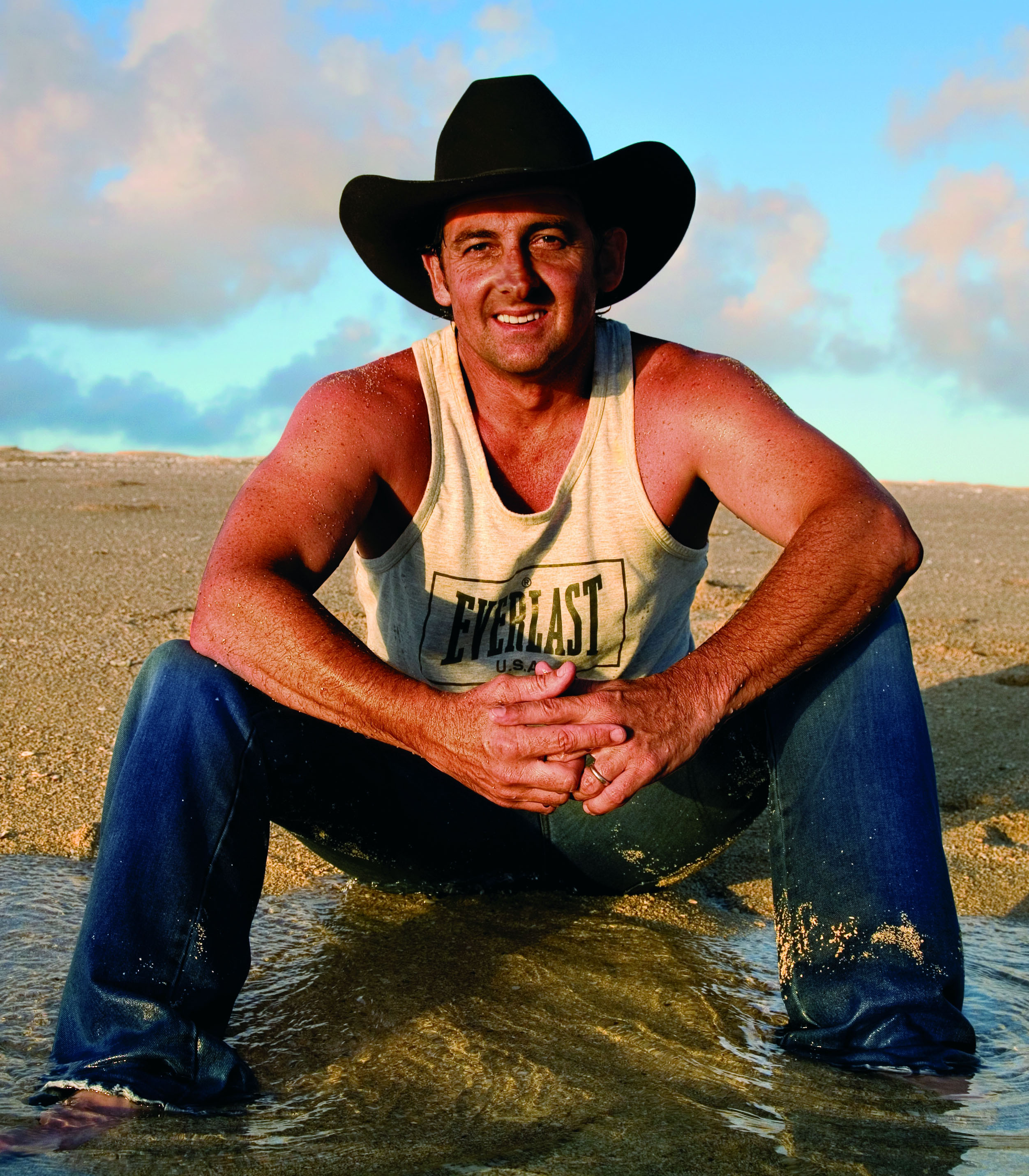
Lee Kernaghan topped the chart for four weeks with Spirit of the Anzacs, commemorating the centenary of the landing at Anzac Cove, becoming one of the year's longest-running number-one albums.

== Chart history ==
Key
The yellow background indicates the #1 album on ARIA's End of Year Albums Chart of 2015.

| Date | Album | Artist(s) | Ref. |
|---|---|---|---|
| 5 January | 1989 | Taylor Swift | |
| 12 January | 1989 | Taylor Swift | |
| 19 January | Title | Meghan Trainor | |
| 26 January | 1989 | Taylor Swift | |
| 2 February | 1989 | Taylor Swift | |
| 9 February | 1989 | Taylor Swift | |
| 16 February | Fifty Shades of Grey: Original Motion Picture Soundtrack | Various artists | |
| 23 February | Fifty Shades of Grey: Original Motion Picture Soundtrack | Various artists | |
| 2 March | Fifty Shades of Grey: Original Motion Picture Soundtrack | Various artists | |
| 9 March | Fifty Shades of Grey: Original Motion Picture Soundtrack | Various artists | |
| 16 March | Rebel Heart | Madonna | |
| 23 March | To Pimp a Butterfly | Kendrick Lamar | |
| 30 March | Spirit of the Anzacs | Lee Kernaghan | |
| 6 April | Spirit of the Anzacs | Lee Kernaghan | |
| 13 April | Spirit of the Anzacs | Lee Kernaghan | |
| 20 April | Spirit of the Anzacs | Lee Kernaghan | |
| 27 April | In the Lonely Hour | Sam Smith | |
| 4 May | In the Lonely Hour | Sam Smith | |
| 11 May | Wilder Mind | Mumford & Sons | |
| 18 May | x | Ed Sheeran | |
| 25 May | Dark Night Sweet Light | Hermitude | |
| 1 June | Empires | Hillsong United | |
| 8 June | How Big, How Blue, How Beautiful | Florence and the Machine | |
| 15 June | Drones | Muse | |
| 22 June | How Big, How Blue, How Beautiful | Florence and the Machine | |
| 29 June | x | Ed Sheeran | |
| 6 July | Highlights from Two Strong Hearts: Live | John Farnham and Olivia Newton-John | |
| 13 July | Highlights from Two Strong Hearts: Live | John Farnham and Olivia Newton-John | |
| 20 July | Highlights from Two Strong Hearts: Live | John Farnham and Olivia Newton-John | |
| 27 July | Currents | Tame Impala | |
| 3 August | Node | Northlane | |
| 10 August | Title | Meghan Trainor | |
| 17 August | Compton | Dr. Dre | |
| 24 August | Venom | Bullet for My Valentine | |
| 31 August | Immortalized | Disturbed | |
| 7 September | Beauty Behind the Madness | The Weeknd | |
| 14 September | Wild | Troye Sivan | |
| 21 September | That's the Spirit | Bring Me the Horizon | |
| 28 September | Honeymoon | Lana Del Rey | |
| 5 October | Ire | Parkway Drive | |
| 12 October | Triple J's Like a Version Volume 11 | Various artists | |
| 19 October | Limit of Love | Boy & Bear | |
| 26 October | Open Heaven / River Wild | Hillsong Worship | |
| 2 November | Sounds Good Feels Good | 5 Seconds of Summer | |
| 9 November | If I Can Dream | Elvis Presley with the Royal Philharmonic Orchestra | |
| 16 November | If I Can Dream | Elvis Presley with the Royal Philharmonic Orchestra | |
| 23 November | Purpose | Justin Bieber | |
| 30 November | 25 | Adele | |
| 7 December | 25 | Adele | |
| 14 December | 25 | Adele | |
| 21 December | 25 | Adele | |
| 28 December | 25 | Adele | |

== Number-one artists ==
| Position | Artist | Weeks at No. 1 |
|---|---|---|
| 1 | Taylor Swift | 5 |
| 1 | Adele | 5 |
| 2 | Lee Kernaghan | 4 |
| 3 | John Farnham | 3 |
| 3 | Olivia Newton-John | 3 |
| 4 | Sam Smith | 2 |
| 4 | Florence and the Machine | 2 |
| 4 | Ed Sheeran | 2 |
| 4 | Meghan Trainor | 2 |
| 4 | Elvis Presley | 2 |
| 4 | Royal Philharmonic Orchestra | 2 |
| 5 | Madonna | 1 |
| 5 | Kendrick Lamar | 1 |
| 5 | Mumford & Sons | 1 |
| 5 | Hermitude | 1 |
| 5 | Hillsong United | 1 |
| 5 | Muse | 1 |
| 5 | Tame Impala | 1 |
| 5 | Northlane | 1 |
| 5 | Dr. Dre | 1 |
| 5 | Bullet for My Valentine | 1 |
| 5 | Disturbed | 1 |
| 5 | The Weeknd | 1 |
| 5 | Troye Sivan | 1 |
| 5 | Bring Me the Horizon | 1 |
| 5 | Lana Del Rey | 1 |
| 5 | Parkway Drive | 1 |
| 5 | Boy & Bear | 1 |
| 5 | Hillsong Worship | 1 |
| 5 | 5 Seconds of Summer | 1 |
| 5 | Justin Bieber | 1 |

== See also ==
- 2015 in music
- List of number-one singles of 2015 (Australia)
- List of Top 25 albums for 2015 in Australia
