= Ire (album) =

Studio album by Parkway Drive
- Released: 25 September 2015
- Recorded: February–May 2015
- Studios: Metalworks Studios, Toronto, Ontario, Canada; All Buttons in Studios, Ottawa, Ontario
- Genres: Metalcore, heavy metal
- Length: 48:13
- Labels: Resist; Epitaph
- Producer: George Hadji-Christou

Parkway Drive chronology
Atlas (2012)	Ire (2015)	Reverence (2018)

Singles from Ire
- 1. "Vice Grip" Released: 8 June 2015; 2. "Crushed" Released: 24 August 2015; 3. "The Sound of Violence" Released: 14 September 2015; 4. "Devil's Calling" Released: 18 July 2016; 5. "Bottom Feeder" Released: 22 September 2016

Ire is the fifth studio album by Australian metalcore band Parkway Drive. It was released on 25 September 2015 through Resist and Epitaph Records, and was streamed online on 20 September. The album was produced by George Hadji-Christou. The band sought to change their established style with Ire, and reviewers have noted the inclusion of new influences.

At the J Awards of 2015, the album was nominated for Australian Album of the Year.

== Composition ==
=== Influences, style and themes ===
Ire marks a change from the style established on the band's previous records. In an interview with Music Feeds, frontman Winston McCall stated: "...in the past ... [when] we took the influence we had and then we put it into the context of what the Parkway Drive formula was, then that influence got mixed or buried or lost among the other stuff. This time around when any influence or unorthodox idea came about we simply ran with it in its whole form and tried to form a concept around that, rather than try to squash it into the pre-existing formula. That became basically the conceptual approach for making this entire record. ... When you're playing the same style of riff, the same drumming, the same vocals and same breakdowns for ten years, what point is there in people listening to your new record or even recording one if it sounds the exact same as the last one?"

The album has been described as moving "away from the shackles of 'metalcore'", as well as representing a "refreshing take on metalcore" and being "decidedly more metal than metal-core on the whole" and reminiscent of '80s metal. Connor McKenzie of Rip It Up calls Rage Against the Machine an influence on the album's direction, both musically and lyrically, with the album being centred thematically around anger as an appropriate reaction to the state of human society. Jaymz Clements of Rolling Stone Australia stated that "the epic sweep of lead single "Vice Grip", the piano-led ponderous stomp of "Writings on the Wall" and the shiny bounce of "Vicious" ... showcase a muscular power-metal edge to [Parkway Drive]." Brenton Harris of Music Feeds described "Destroyer" as showcasing "Jeff Ling and Luke Kilpatrick's harmonised classic metal riffs clashing against a ferocious backdrop", said that "Dying To Believe"'s "chaotic juxtaposition of death-metal rhythmic patterns in the verses and pit-call inciting half-time chorus hit like a napalm bomb ..., simultaneously calling to mind Lamb of God, Slayer and Slipknot" and highlighted the "nu-metal tinged stomp of 'Writings on the Wall' ... which integrates spoken-word vocals, piano and classical instrumentation".

== Release and promotion ==
Ire was announced on 8 June 2015, when the first song from the album, "Vice Grip", was released, accompanied by a music video. On 24 August, Parkway Drive released a second song, "Crushed", also accompanied by a video. On 14 September, the band released a third song, "The Sound of Violence". On 20 September, the album was streamed online in its entirety.

Throughout 2015, the band headlined tours across Australia and the United States in support of the album. In May 2016, they supported A Day to Remember on their Just Some Shows tour of the U.S. On 15 July, the band released a Deluxe Edition of the album, with 2 new tracks and a remix of the song "A Deathless Song" with guest vocals by Tonight Alive's Jenna McDougall.

== Critical reception ==
Professional ratings
Review scores
Source	Rating
Already Heard	3/5 stars
Distorted Sound	9/10
Impericon	93%
KillYourStereo	80/100
Louder Sound	4/5 stars
Rolling Stone Australia	4/5 stars

The album received positive reviews from critics. Already Heard rated the album 3 out of 5 and said: "After beginning so promisingly, Ire ends up being a tale of two halves, and whilst this is disappointing I can still say hand on heart that I enjoyed listening to it. If you're already well acquainted with these guys then get this as well because it will give you joy. For everyone else, go with Horizons or Deep Blue for prime Parkway cuts."

Distorted Sound scored the album 9 out of 10 and said: "It's difficult to continuously break boundaries when you yourself set those boundaries in place with previous bodies of work, but that's exactly what PARKWAY DRIVE have done with Ire. Even if this album is to act as a transition record for the band for the new direction they wish to take it still stands tall amongst the rest of their back catalogue. It solidifies the Byron Bay lads as one of the most vital and impressive bands in the genre, and indeed in the entire heavy metal scene. If the changes made on Ire doesn't do it for you, then its probably best you re-evaluate before you lose interest in what is soon to be a shining example of just how well progression should be done."

Alasdair Belling from KillYourStereo gave the album 80 out of 100 and said: "Ire is the album Parkway Drive needed to produce to remain fresh and relevant. When approached from a purely musical perspective, this album is a fantastic, unique exploration into the world of metal. It's powerful, it's loud and despite all the change, it's Parkway Drive firing on every level." Louder Sound gave the album a positive review and stated: "Despite the odd sidestep and inconsistency that stops it just shy of being a classic, Ire is an album that should be applauded for not only being a gallant effort that has seen Parkway Drive transcend the limits of metalcore, but also for producing moments of spectacle, which at their best result in the best songs of the band's career."

== Commercial performance ==
The album was included at number 21 on Rock Sound's top 50 releases of 2015 list.

== Touring ==
In 2015, Parkway Drive announced they will be touring Australia, North America and Europe (and doing one show in Auckland) in support of Ire. On the Australian leg of the tour, they will be supported by Thy Art Is Murder, Memphis May Fire and The Word Alive. On the NA leg, they will be supported by Miss May I, Thy Art Is Murder and In Hearts Wake. On the European leg, they will be supported by Bury Tomorrow in the United Kingdom and Architects in the rest of Europe, alongside Thy Art Is Murder. Suicide Silence was originally supposed to appear on the Australian leg in place of Thy Art Is Murder, but they dropped to support Korn on their 20th anniversary tour.

== Track listing ==
All tracks are written by Winston McCall, Jeff Ling, Luke Kilpatrick, and Benjamin Gordon, except where noted; credited to Parkway Drive.

No.	Title	Length
1.	"Destroyer"	4:47
2.	"Dying to Believe"	3:12
3.	"Vice Grip"	4:23
4.	"Crushed"	4:36
5.	"Fractures"	5:32
6.	"Writings on the Wall"	4:23
7.	"Bottom Feeder"	4:20
8.	"The Sound of Violence"	3:24
9.	"Vicious"	4:20
10.	"Dedicated"	3:22
11.	"A Deathless Song"	5:54
Total length:		48:13

Deluxe Edition
No.	Title	Length
12.	"Devil's Calling"	3:26
13.	"Into the Dark"	3:30
14.	"A Deathless Song" (new version; featuring Jenna McDougall)	4:00
Total length:		59:09

== Personnel ==
Parkway Drive

- Winston McCall – lead vocals
- Jeff Ling – lead guitar
- Luke "Pig" Kilpatrick – rhythm guitar
- Jia "Pie" O'Connor – bass
- Ben "Gaz" Gordon – drums

Additional musicians

- Tim Millar of Protest the Hero – guest piano on track 6
- Jenna McDougall of Tonight Alive – guest vocals on track 14
- Greg Weeks – cello, strings composition and arrangement
- Christian Vachon – violin
- Maria Demacheva – violin

Additional personnel

- George Hadji-Christou – production, strings composition and arrangement
- Dean Hadji-Christou – engineering @ All Buttons in and Metalworks
- Kevin Dietz – assistant engineering
- Peter Rutcho – mixing
- Ted Jensen – mastering
- Callum Preston – artwork, creation, execution

== Charts ==
=== Weekly charts ===
Chart (2015)	Peak position
Australian Albums (ARIA)	1
Austrian Albums (Ö3 Austria)	11
Belgian Albums (Ultratop Flanders)	16
Belgian Albums (Ultratop Wallonia)	45
Canadian Albums (Billboard)	22
Dutch Albums (Album Top 100)	75
French Albums (SNEP)	166
German Albums (Offizielle Top 100)	8
New Zealand Albums (RMNZ)	15
Scottish Albums (Official Charts)	22
Swedish Albums (Sverigetopplistan)	60
Swiss Albums (Schweizer Hitparade)	12
UK Albums (Official Charts)	23
UK Independent Albums (Official Charts)	4
UK Rock & Metal Albums (Official Charts)	3
US Billboard 200	29
US Top Hard Rock Albums (Billboard)	1
US Top Rock Albums (Billboard)	4

=== Year-end charts ===
Chart (2015)	Position
Australian Albums (ARIA)	44
