= List of top 25 albums for 2015 in Australia =

Top 25 albums of 2015 < 2014 2016 >

Other Australian top charts for 2015
- top 25 singles
- Triple J Hottest 100

Australian number-one charts of 2015
- albums
- singles
- urban singles
- dance singles
- club tracks
- digital tracks
- streaming tracks

The following lists the top 25 albums of 2015 in Australia from the Australian Recording Industry Association (ARIA) end-of-year albums chart.

Adele's album 25 was named the highest selling album in Australia in 2015. The album was released in November and spent six weeks at number one. Ed Sheeran's album x was number 1 and Taylor Swift's 1989 was number 2 in 2014; they're both one spot lower in 2015. Sam Smith's In the Lonely Hour is the sixth-best-selling album for the second year in a row and Michael Bublé's Christmas appeared in the top 10 end-of-year chart for the fifth consecutive year. There were 35 Australian artist releases in the top 100, with Lee Kernaghan's Spirit of the Anzacs being the best selling Australian album in 2015.

== Top 25 ==
No.	Title	Artist	Highest pos. reached
1	25	Adele	1
2	x	Ed Sheeran	1
3	1989	Taylor Swift	1
4	Purpose	Justin Bieber	1
5	Title	Meghan Trainor	1
6	In the Lonely Hour	Sam Smith	1
7	Christmas	Michael Bublé	1
8	Spirit of the Anzacs	Lee Kernaghan	1
9	Made in the A.M.	One Direction	2
10	How Big, How Blue, How Beautiful	Florence + The Machine	1
11	If I Can Dream	Elvis Presley with the Royal Philharmonic Orchestra	1
12	Hozier	Hozier	3
13	Fifty Shades of Grey	soundtrack	1
14	1000 Forms of Fear	Sia	1
15	Beauty Behind the Madness	The Weeknd	1
16	Dream Your Life Away	Vance Joy	1
17	Chaos and the Calm	James Bay	3
18	Wilder Mind	Mumford & Sons	1
19	Frozen (soundtrack)	Various artists	1
20	The Very Best of Richie	The Twelfth Man	4
21	Compton	Dr. Dre	1
22	A Head Full of Dreams	Coldplay	2
23	To Pimp a Butterfly	Kendrick Lamar	1
24	Triple J’s Like a Version 11	various artists	1
25	Walking Under Stars	Hilltop Hoods	1

- Note: Frozen (soundtrack), Dream Your Life Away, 1000 Forms of Fear and Christmas peaked at number 1 but not in 2015.

== See also ==
- List of number-one albums of 2015 (Australia)
- List of Top 25 singles for 2015 in Australia
