= List of number-one club tracks of 2015 (Australia) =

ARIA Charts number-one club tracks of 2015 < 2014 2016 >

Other Australian number-one charts of 2015
- albums
- singles
- urban singles
- dance singles
- digital tracks
- streaming tracks

Top Australian singles and albums of 2015
- Triple J Hottest 100
- top 25 singles
- top 25 albums

This is the list of number-one tracks on the ARIA Club Chart in 2015, compiled by the Australian Recording Industry Association (ARIA) from weekly DJ reports.

== 2015 ==
Date		Song	Artist(s)	Reference
January	12	"Bugatti"	Tiga featuring Pusha T	
January	19	"Faces"	Glover	
January	26	"Faces"	Glover	
February	2	"Faces"	Glover	
February	9	"Faces"	Glover	
February	16	"Faces"	Glover	
February	23	"Intoxicated"	Martin Solveig and GTA	
March	2	"Intoxicated"	Martin Solveig and GTA	
March	9	"Intoxicated"	Martin Solveig and GTA	
March	16	"Intoxicated"	Martin Solveig and GTA	
March	23	"Hipsta"	Timmy Trumpet and Chardy	
March	30	"Hipsta"	Timmy Trumpet and Chardy	
April	6	"Hipsta"	Timmy Trumpet and Chardy	
April	13	"Gonna Get Better"	Nicky Night Time featuring Nat Dunn	
April	20	"Gonna Get Better"	Nicky Night Time featuring Nat Dunn	
April	27	"I Just Can't"	Crookers featuring Jeremih	
May	4	"I Just Can't"	Crookers featuring Jeremih	
May	11	"I Just Can't"	Crookers featuring Jeremih	
May	18	"I Just Can't"	Crookers featuring Jeremih	
May	25	"I Just Can't"	Crookers featuring Jeremih	
June	1	"Soul Makossa (money)"	Yolanda Be Cool and DCUP	
June	8	"Soul Makossa (money)"	Yolanda Be Cool and DCUP	
June	15	"Echo"	Kyro and A-Tonez	
June	22	"Echo"	Kyro and A-Tonez	
June	29	"Echo"	Kyro and A-Tonez	
July	6	"Take Me Away"	DJ S.K.T featuring Rae	
July	13	"Take Me Away"	DJ S.K.T featuring Rae	
July	20	"Funk Face"	Death Ray Shake	
July	27	"Define"	Dom Dolla and Go Freek	
August	3	"Define"	Dom Dolla and Go Freek	
August	10	"Define"	Dom Dolla and Go Freek	
August	17	"How Deep Is Your Love"	Calvin Harris and Disciples	
August	24	"How Deep Is Your Love"	Calvin Harris and Disciples	
August	31	"How Deep Is Your Love"	Calvin Harris and Disciples	
September	7	"How Deep Is Your Love"	Calvin Harris and Disciples	
September	14	"How Deep Is Your Love"	Calvin Harris and Disciples	
September	21	"How Deep Is Your Love"	Calvin Harris and Disciples	
September	28	"How Deep Is Your Love"	Calvin Harris and Disciples	
October	5	"Flowers"	Nicky Night Time featuring Nat Dunn	
October	12	"Flowers"	Nicky Night Time featuring Nat Dunn	
October	19	"Flowers"	Nicky Night Time featuring Nat Dunn	
October	26	"Flowers"	Nicky Night Time featuring Nat Dunn	
November	2	"Flowers"	Nicky Night Time featuring Nat Dunn	
November	9	"Ocean Drive"	Duke Dumont	
November	16	"Ocean Drive"	Duke Dumont	
November	23	"Ocean Drive"	Duke Dumont	
November	30	"Ocean Drive"	Duke Dumont	
December	7	"Ocean Drive"	Duke Dumont	
December	14	"Ocean Drive"	Duke Dumont	
December	21	"Ocean Drive"	Duke Dumont	
December	28	"Ocean Drive"	Duke Dumont	

== Number-one artists ==
Position	Artist	Weeks at No. 1
1	Duke Dumont	8
2	Calvin Harris	7
2	Disciples	7
2	Nicky Night Time	7
2	Nat Dunn	7
3	Crookers	5
3	Jeremih	5
3	Glover	5
4	Martin Solveig	4
4	GTA	4
5	A-Tonez	3
5	Timmy Trumpet	3
5	Chardy	3
5	Dom Dolla	3
5	Go Freek	3
5	Kyro	3
6	DJ S.K.T	2
6	Yolanda Be Cool	2
6	DCUP	2
7	Death Ray Shake	1
7	Tiga	1
7	Pusha T	1

== See also ==
- ARIA Charts
- List of number-one singles of 2015 (Australia)
- List of number-one albums of 2015 (Australia)
- List of number-one dance singles of 2015 (Australia)
- 2015 in music
