= List of number-one dance singles of 2015 (Australia) =

ARIA Charts number-one dance singles of 2015 < 2014 2016 >

Other Australian number-one charts of 2015
- albums
- singles
- urban singles
- club tracks
- digital tracks
- streaming tracks

Top Australian singles and albums of 2015
- Triple J Hottest 100
- top 25 singles
- top 25 albums

The ARIA Dance Chart is a chart that ranks the best-performing dance singles of Australia. It is published by Australian Recording Industry Association (ARIA), an organisation who collect music data for the weekly ARIA Charts. To be eligible to appear on the chart, the recording must be a single, and be "predominantly of a dance nature, or with a featured track of a dance nature, or included in the ARIA Club Chart or a comparable overseas chart".

In 2015, eleven singles have topped the chart. "Lean On" by Major Lazer is the longest-running chart-topping dance single of 2015.

== Chart history ==
Issue date	Song	Artist(s)	Reference
5 January	"I'm an Albatraoz"	AronChupa	
12 January	"I'm an Albatraoz"	AronChupa	
19 January	"Cheerleader" (Felix Jaehn Remix)	OMI	
26 January	"Cheerleader" (Felix Jaehn Remix)	OMI	
2 February	"Cheerleader" (Felix Jaehn Remix)	OMI	
9 February	"Cheerleader" (Felix Jaehn Remix)	OMI	
16 February	"Cheerleader" (Felix Jaehn Remix)	OMI	
23 February	"Cheerleader" (Felix Jaehn Remix)	OMI	
2 March	"Cheerleader" (Felix Jaehn Remix)	OMI	
9 March	"Cheerleader" (Felix Jaehn Remix)	OMI	
16 March	"Cheerleader" (Felix Jaehn Remix)	OMI	
23 March	"Cheerleader" (Felix Jaehn Remix)	OMI	
30 March	"Lean On"	Major Lazer and DJ Snake featuring MØ	
6 April	"Lean On"	Major Lazer and DJ Snake featuring MØ	
13 April	"Lean On"	Major Lazer and DJ Snake featuring MØ	
20 April	"Lean On"	Major Lazer and DJ Snake featuring MØ	
27 April	"Lean On"	Major Lazer and DJ Snake featuring MØ	
4 May	"Lean On"	Major Lazer and DJ Snake featuring MØ	
11 May	"Lean On"	Major Lazer and DJ Snake featuring MØ	
18 May	"Lean On"	Major Lazer and DJ Snake featuring MØ	
25 May	"Lean On"	Major Lazer and DJ Snake featuring MØ	
1 June	"Lean On"	Major Lazer and DJ Snake featuring MØ	
8 June	"Lean On"	Major Lazer and DJ Snake featuring MØ	
15 June	"Powerful"	Major Lazer featuring Ellie Goulding & Tarrus Riley	
22 June	"Powerful"	Major Lazer featuring Ellie Goulding & Tarrus Riley	
29 June	"Powerful"	Major Lazer featuring Ellie Goulding & Tarrus Riley	
6 July	"Powerful"	Major Lazer featuring Ellie Goulding & Tarrus Riley	
13 July	"Peanut Butter Jelly"	Galantis	
20 July	"Are You With Me"	Lost Frequencies	
27 July	"Are You With Me"	Lost Frequencies	
3 August	"Are You With Me"	Lost Frequencies	
10 August	"Are You With Me"	Lost Frequencies	
17 August	"Are You With Me"	Lost Frequencies	
24 August	"Are You With Me"	Lost Frequencies	
31 August	"Are You With Me"	Lost Frequencies	
7 September	"Peanut Butter Jelly"	Galantis	
14 September	"Easy Love"	Sigala	
21 September	"Easy Love"	Sigala	
28 September	"Sugar"	Robin Schulz featuring Francesco Yates	
5 October	"Sugar"	Robin Schulz featuring Francesco Yates	
12 October	"Sugar"	Robin Schulz featuring Francesco Yates	
19 October	"Sugar"	Robin Schulz featuring Francesco Yates	
26 October	"Sugar"	Robin Schulz featuring Francesco Yates	
2 November	"Sugar"	Robin Schulz featuring Francesco Yates	
9 November	"Ocean Drive"	Duke Dumont	
16 November	"Ocean Drive"	Duke Dumont	
23 November	"The Trouble with Us"	Marcus Marr & Chet Faker	
30 November	"Ocean Drive"	Duke Dumont	
7 December	"Ocean Drive"	Duke Dumont	
14 December	"Ocean Drive"	Duke Dumont	
21 December	"Ocean Drive"	Duke Dumont	
28 December	"Fast Car"	Jonas Blue featuring Dakota	

== Number-one artists ==
Position	Artist	Weeks at No. 1
1	Major Lazer	16
2	DJ Snake	11
2	MØ (as featuring)	11
3	OMI	10
4	Lost Frequencies	7
5	Robin Schulz	6
5	Francesco Yates (as featuring)	6
5	Duke Dumont	6
6	Ellie Goulding (as featuring)	4
7	AronChupa	2
7	Galantis	2
7	Sigala	2
8	Jonas Blue	1
8	Dakota (as featuring)	1
8	Marcus Marr	1
8	Chet Faker	1

== See also ==
- 2015 in music
- List of number-one singles of 2015 (Australia)
- List of number-one club tracks of 2015 (Australia)
