= Bills (song) =

Single by LunchMoney Lewis

from the EP Bills
- Released: February 5, 2015
- Recorded: 2014
- Genre: Hip hop; soul; jazz
- Length: 3:25
- Label: Kemosabe; Columbia
- Songwriters: Eric Frederic; Rickard Göransson; Jacob Kasher Hindlin; Gamal Lewis
- Producer: Ricky Reed

LunchMoney Lewis singles chronology
"Bills" (2015)	"Whip It!" (2015)

Music video
- "Bills" on YouTube

"Bills" is the debut single by American rapper LunchMoney Lewis. The song was released on February 5, 2015, by Kemosabe Records and Columbia Records. The song was recorded in 2014 and produced by Lewis himself, alongside Rickard Göransson, Jacob Kasher Hindlin, and the song's producer, Ricky Reed. The track is a hip-hop, soul, and jazz record, and is lyrically about Lewis doing anything to provide for his family, such as paying bills.

Upon its release, the single was commercially successful, peaking at number 79 on the Billboard Hot 100 in the United States. It also topped the charts in Australia, the Czech Republic, and Scotland, and peaked within the top ten of the charts in Belgium (Flanders), New Zealand, Ireland, and the United Kingdom. It would additionally be certified Gold by the Recording Industry Association of America (RIAA) and 3× Platinum by the Australian Recording Industry Association (RIAA) for equivalent sales of 500,000 and 210,000 units respectively.

The song was promoted with a music video, which was released on the 20th of February, 2015. The video, directed by Emil Nava, currently has over 102,000,000 views and 1,000,000 likes as of 2025. An extended play (EP) of the same name was released on the 21st of April, 2015, featuring the track alongside three others, including the track "Mama", which peaked at number 41 on the Pop Airplay chart in the United States.

== Background and composition ==
Lewis discussed the song's conception: "Ricky played the beat and that just started the idea. I sang 'I got bills' and he just popped up off his chair. It was like a chain reaction. Ricky doesn't really get excited about much. I don't either because we write so much, so it's hard to gauge but there was a good feeling. We were writing about things people can relate to, which is fun. It's all truthful."

Described as a novelty song, "Bills" features "elements of hip-hop and soul, with a ragtag, jazz sound". The song has a tempo of 126 beats per minute, and is in the key of F major. The song was written by Lewis himself, alongside Rickard Göransson, Jacob Kasher Hindlin, and Ricky Reed, the latter also producing the track.

== Music video ==
A music video to accompany the release of "Bills" was first released onto YouTube on February 20, 2015. The video is directed by Emil Nava. The video depicts Lewis attempting to go about his day, only to be accosted by his, presumed to be, wife, who nags him, a girl scout who overcharges him for lemonade, and numerous other humorous pratfalls related in the song.

== Track listing ==
Bills – Single
No.	Title	Length
1.	"Bills"	3:25

=== EP ===
Bills – EP
No.	Title	Writer(s)	Producer(s)	Length
1.	"Bills"	Gamal Lewis; Eric Frederic; Jacob Kasher; Rickard Göransson	Ricky Reed	3:24
2.	"Mama"	Lewis; Frederic; Kasher; Peter Svensson	Reed	3:24
3.	"Love Me Back"	Lewis; Frederic; Kasher; Jason Evigan	Reed	3:00
4.	"Real Thing"	Lewis; Frederic; John Theodore Geiger II; Joe Spargur; Kasher	Joe London; Reed	3:41
Total length:				13:29

== Credits and personnel ==
Credits from ASCAP.

- Eric Frederic – composer
- Rickard Göransson – composer
- Jacob Kasher – composer
- Gamal Lewis – composer
- Ricky Reed – producer, programmer, recording engineer
- Drew Kapner – recording engineer
- Kyle Mann – recording engineer
- Alex Gruszecki – assistant engineer
- John Hanes – mixing engineer
- Serban Ghenea – mixing engineer
- Chris Gehringer – mastering engineer

== Charts and certifications ==
=== Weekly charts ===
Chart (2015)	Peak position
Australia (ARIA)	1
Australia Urban (ARIA)	1
Austria (Ö3 Austria Top 40)	7
Belgium (Ultratip Bubbling Under Flanders)	2
Canada Hot 100 (Billboard)	71
Canada CHR/Top 40 (Billboard)	42
Czech Republic Airplay (ČNS IFPI)	1
Czech Republic Singles Digital (ČNS IFPI)	66
France (SNEP)	121
Germany (GfK)	15
Hungary (Editors' Choice Top 40)	36
Ireland (IRMA)	5
Netherlands (Dutch Top 40)	15
Netherlands (Single Top 100)	14
New Zealand (Recorded Music NZ)	6
Scottish Singles Sales (Official Charts)	1
Slovakia Singles Digital (ČNS IFPI)	63
Slovenia (SloTop50)	24
Spain (Promusicae)	29
Switzerland (Schweizer Hitparade)	44
UK Singles (Official Charts)	2
US Billboard Hot 100	79
US Hot Rap Songs (Billboard)	16
US Dance Airplay (Billboard)	35
US Pop Airplay (Billboard)	26

=== Year-end charts ===
Chart (2015)	Position
Australia (ARIA)	27
Australia Urban (ARIA)	7
Austria (Ö3 Austria Top 40)	46
Germany (Official German Charts)	60
Netherlands (Dutch Top 40)	70
Netherlands (Single Top 100)	68
UK Singles (Official Charts Company)	46

=== Certifications ===
Region	Certification	Certified units/sales
Australia (ARIA)	3× Platinum	210,000^{‡}
Austria (IFPI Austria)	Gold	15,000^{‡}
Germany (BVMI)	Gold	200,000^{‡}
New Zealand (RMNZ)	Gold	7,500^{*}
United Kingdom (BPI)	Platinum	600,000^{‡}
United States (RIAA)	Gold	500,000^{‡}
^{*} Sales figures based on certification alone.^{‡} Sales+streaming figures based on certification alone.

== Release history ==
Country	Date	Format	Record label
Worldwide	February 5, 2015	Digital download	Kemosabe Records
United Kingdom	May 10, 2015	Digital download	Kemosabe Records
