= What Do You Mean? =

2015 single by Justin Bieber

Single by Justin Bieber

from the album Purpose
- Released: August 28, 2015
- Recorded: June 2015
- Studio: Record Plant (Hollywood, Los Angeles)
- Genre: Pop; tropical house; dance
- Length: 3:26
- Label: Def Jam
- Songwriters: Justin Bieber; Jason Boyd; Mason Levy
- Producers: MdL; Bieber

Justin Bieber singles chronology
"Where Are Ü Now" (2015)	"What Do You Mean?" (2015)	"Sorry" (2015)

Music videos
- "What Do You Mean?" on YouTube; "What Do You Mean?" (Purpose version) on YouTube

"What Do You Mean?" is a song by Canadian singer Justin Bieber. It was released on August 28, 2015, by Def Jam as the lead single from his fourth studio album Purpose (2015). The song was produced by MdL and co-produced by Bieber. It was featured in several year-end lists of best songs of 2015. Commercially, the song topped the charts in several countries, including Canada, Ireland, New Zealand, and Norway. In Australia, the United States, and the United Kingdom, "What Do You Mean?" was Bieber’s first number-one single. The song's music video features Bieber in bed with a young woman, Xenia Deli, and masked men kidnapping them, as well as an appearance from actor John Leguizamo. Since its release, Bieber has mentioned that the song is about his relationship with Selena Gomez. A remix with American singer-songwriter Ariana Grande was released on October 16, 2015, exclusively on iTunes on a preorder of the album, and as a bonus track on its deluxe edition on Apple Music.

== Background ==
Following the release of the EDM track "Where Are Ü Now" (2015), where Bieber collaborated with Skrillex and Diplo for their project Jack Ü and achieving worldwide success and acclaim with it, the singer announced "What Do You Mean?" as the first single from his then-upcoming album on July 28, 2015, on On Air With Ryan Seacrest. While he was there, his manager, Scooter Braun, made Seacrest a promotional sign for the single to hold and suggested he should put the photo on his Instagram account. To further promote the song's release, Braun contacted several celebrities who started counting down the days until the release, among them Mariah Carey, Ed Sheeran, Ariana Grande, Big Sean, Alanis Morissette, Meghan Trainor, Britney Spears, Hilary Duff, Little Mix, Chris Martin, Carly Rae Jepsen, and many others. During an interview with Ryan Seacrest, he described it as fun, summery, and amazing. Regarding its lyrics, he commented, "Well, girls are often just flip-floppy. They say something and they mean something else. So what do you mean? I don't really know, that's why I'm asking." Later, on August 19, 2015, Bieber direct-messaged different lyrics from the song to 49 randomly selected Twitter followers. As explained by Billboard's Jason Lipshutz, Each message included a clock animation with a different time that corresponded to the lyric's placement in the song, and Beliebers spent Wednesday collectively piecing together the upcoming single's lyrics in order. On August 5, 2015, Bieber presented the song to radio professionals at an iHeartMedia event.

== Release ==
The song was released on August 28, 2015, and was serviced to contemporary hit radio on September 1, 2015. On the morning of its release, Justin Bieber appeared on Elvis Duran and the Morning Show to discuss his new song. On October 16, 2015, it was revealed that a remix of the song with Ariana Grande would be made available if fans pre-ordered the album on iTunes.

On January 8, 2016, the official remix by Alison Wonderland was released on online.

== Composition ==
"What Do You Mean?" was written by Justin Bieber, Jason "Poo Bear" Boyd and Mason Levy. It was produced by MdL and co-produced by Bieber. It was initially speculated by the media that Skrillex produced "What Do You Mean?". However, a spokesperson for Bieber confirmed in an interview for Rolling Stone that the song was produced by Bieber, and MdL who had previously collaborated with the singer on his single "Boyfriend" (2012). Written in the key of A♭ major, it has an upbeat tempo of 125 beats per minute. Bieber's vocal range spans from the low note of F_{3} to the high note of G_{4}. It is a pop, tropical house and dance song. Downtempo with hints of dark electropop.

During the song, Bieber uses a breathy vocal, which was considered smooth and soulful. The production contains flute instrumentation, looped vocal samples, piano chords, tropical synths, bass and slick beat elements with the sound of a clock ticking. Gil Kaufman of MTV News wrote that the track contains a slippery flute-like trill over a spare tick-tock island groove and a super chill vibe, and is a kind of sequel to Skrillex and Diplo's "Where Are Ü Now", which featured Bieber.

Lyrically, "What Do You Mean?" talks about looking for romantic clarity and not being able to figure out the opposite sex, with Bieber singing in the chorus, "What do you mean/When you nod your head yes, but you wanna say no?/What do you mean/When you don't want me to move, but you tell me to go?".

== Ariana Grande remix ==
A remix with American singer Ariana Grande was released on October 16, 2015, was available to listen to if fans had already pre-ordered the album on iTunes before November 13, 2015 (the album's release date). The fans who did not pre-order the album before the 13th would not be able to listen to it fully on iTunes and Apple Music but could listen to a short sample of the song via iTunes and through a third-party source online.

== Critical reception ==
The song was positively received. USA Today's Carly Mallenbaum, who heard the song in early August, described it as a "catchy dance track for the club". Similarly, a writer for The Daily Beast said, "['What Do You Mean?' is] pretty damn catchy; a slow-burner that, like that collab, swells into a Bieber banger". Gil Kaufman of MTV News also called it a "banger", explaining, "the track is classic JB: seductive, earnest, pleading and just the right amount of sexy". Digital Spy's Amy Davidson named it "the perfect pop track as well as a skewed love song for millennials." Andrew Unterberger of Spin opined the song was "really quite delightful". Sean Fitz-Gerald of Vulture was also positive, noting that it "sounds like what would happen if you took Steve Aoki's alarm clock to a tropical beach resort. (In other words, electro-catchy as hell.)" Jason Lipshutz of Billboard gave the song a four-out-of-five-stars rating and commented that it was "positioned as [Bieber's] huge comeback bid", adding: "The song synthesizes the positive components of 'Where Are U Now' and presents something warmer and friendlier, but no less nuanced or impressive". NME named it "the perfect pop confection: light as air and catchy as hell, allowing us to glimpse the vulnerability behind the megastar façade as Biebs grappled endearingly with the mysteries of womankind."

Andy Kellman of AllMusic selected the song as one of the album's highlights, naming the song and "Sorry" as tracks that "showed him making a deeper connection with his material and that, yes, he was progressing from performer to artist." In a similar mode, Leah Greenblatt of Entertainment Weekly said both songs and "Where Are Ü Now" were "stripped down for maximum aerodynamics, the vocals mentholated and sweetened with a brushstroke of bass here, a snake-charmer synth line there." Brad Nelson of Pitchfork praised the song and "Sorry" for being "vivid tropical house tracks that sound like sunlight drifting down through palm fronds. Bieber's voice often resembles a breath contorted inexpressively through notes; here, he lets it weightlessly fall through textures. They are his best performances to date, allowing him to flex a rhythmic playfulness without communicating an iota of legible emotion." Sheldon Pearce of Complex called it "the album's spiritual centerpiece," while Janine Schaults of Consequence selected it as one of the album's essential tracks. Josh Duboff of Vanity Fair considered it "breezy and low-key, like "Where Are Ü Now?" with 35 percent less propulsion." He also found it to be "vaguely reminiscent of OMI's omnipresent 'Cheerleader'," and that "Bieber sounds more relaxed and confident than perhaps ever before on the track." Nick Messitte of Forbes agreed with the "Cheerleader" comparison, noting that it has "the intersection of the mellow and the danceable, the four-on-the-floor with the smooth."

Consequence wrote in a positive review "Skrillex serves as producer of this slow burner, providing loops of tropical-flavored house beats to complement Bieber's delicate croons."

=== Year-end lists ===
Critic/publication	List	Rank	Ref.
Entertainment Weekly	The 40 Best Songs of 2015	2	
MTV	Best Songs of 2015	9	
NME	NME's Tracks of the Year 2015	3	
Spin	The 101 Best Songs of 2015	1	
Time Out	The 100 Best Songs of 2015	41	
Village Voice	Pazz & Jop	29	

== Commercial performance ==
=== North America ===
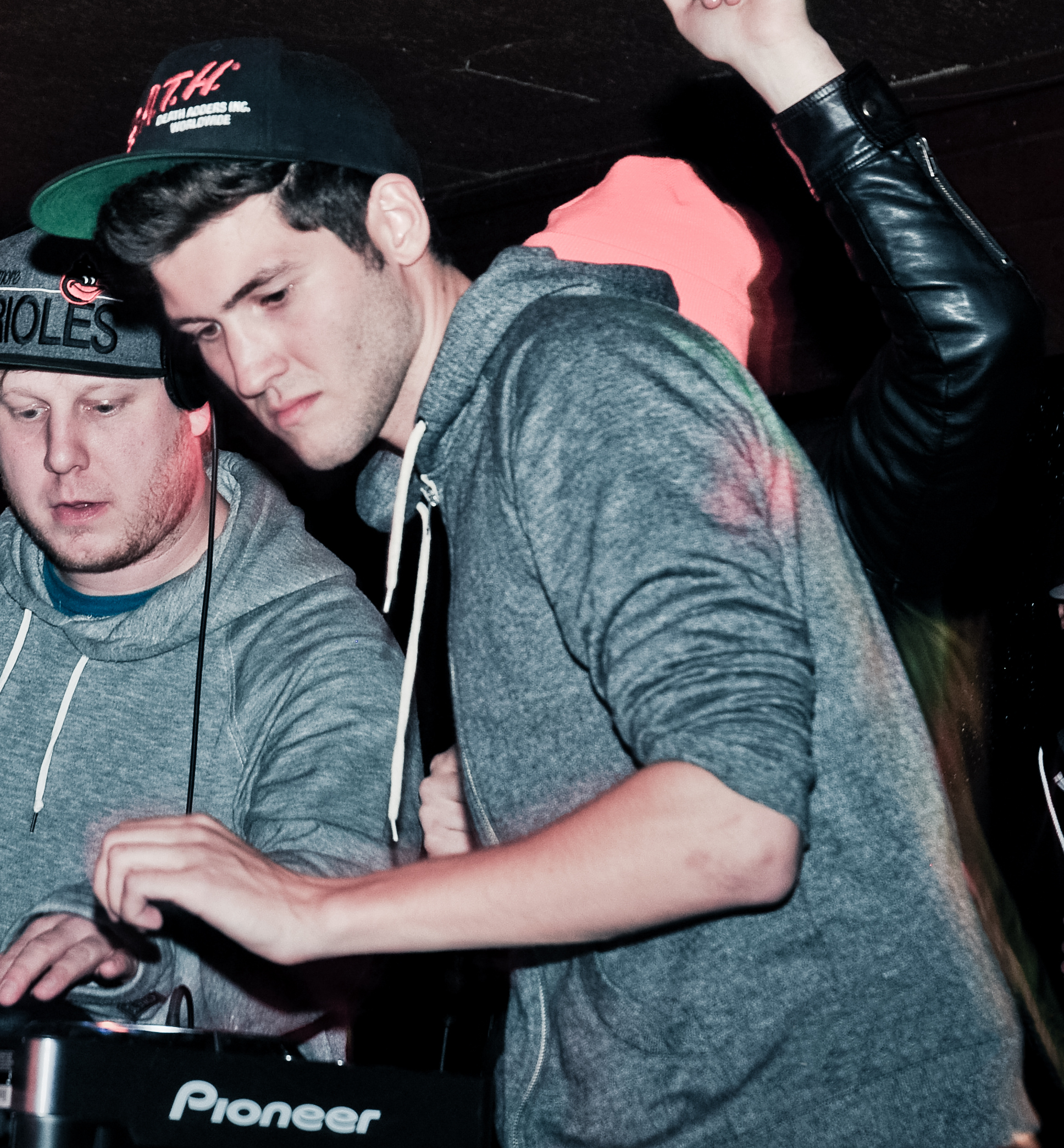
With "What Do You Mean?", Bieber surpassed Baauer to become the youngest male artist to debut at No. 1 on the Billboard Hot 100.

In the United States, "What Do You Mean?" debuted at number 28 on the Mainstream Top 40 chart dated September 12, after three days of release, with a radio audience of 20 million. On the chart dated October 24, after earning "Greatest Gainer" honors for two consecutive weeks, it rose from 3 to 1 on the Mainstream Top 40 chart, becoming Bieber's first number-one song on the Pop Songs chart. The song debuted at number one on the Billboard Hot 100 issued for September 19, 2015, replacing The Weeknd's "Can't Feel My Face" at the top of the chart for one week. It marked Bieber's first number-one single and seventh top 10 hit in the United States, and was also the 23rd song to begin at number one in the Hot 100's 57-year history. Additionally, the single's debut made Bieber the youngest male artist to enter atop of the chart, and the youngest artist since Fantasia's "I Believe" (2004). The track also debuted at number one on the Billboard Hot Digital Songs chart, selling 337,000 copies in the week ending September 3, 2015, marking Bieber's second number one single on the chart, following "Boyfriend" which sold 521,000 in its debut week. In its second week, "What Do You Mean?" stayed at the top of the Hot Digital Songs chart with sales of 159,000 copies, however, it descended to number three on the Hot 100, with a decrease of 30% in overall activity, but rebounded to the runner-up spot the following week and stayed as the best-selling song with 128,000 downloads.

On the chart dated December 5, 2015, after the release of Purpose, the song ascended from 6 to 5 on the Hot 100. That week, Bieber's "Sorry" and "Love Yourself" (a track from Purpose, which debuted on the chart, after selling 140,000 downloads) were at number two and four, respectively, which made the singer only the third artist to have three singles inside the chart's top five (the others being The Beatles in 1964 and 50 Cent in 2005). Additionally, the same week, Bieber had 17 songs on the Hot 100 simultaneously, breaking the record previously held by The Beatles and Drake. On the chart dated 6 February 2016, the song spent a 21st consecutive week inside the Hot 100's top ten, tying with Nicki Minaj's "Starships" and Maroon 5's "Sugar" for the most weeks a song has logged in the Hot 100's top 10 from its debut. The record was surpassed later by Bieber's "Love Yourself", which spent 23 consecutive weeks in the top ten since its debut. As of February 2016, "What Do You Mean?" has sold over 1,600,000 copies in the United States.

In Bieber's native Canada, "What Do You Mean?" debuted at number one on the Canadian Hot 100, with sales of 48,000 copies, becoming the biggest first-week sales total of 2015 at the time and the highest since Eminem released "The Monster" (2013). It also broke the streaming record in Canada, with 3.1 million streams in its first week. "What Do You Mean?" marked Bieber's second number-one single in the country, following 2012's "Boyfriend". After six consecutive weeks at number one in Canada, it was briefly knocked off the top spot by another Canadian singer, The Weeknd, with his single "The Hills", but returned for a seventh non-consecutive week at number one, being replaced by Adele's "Hello" the following week.

=== Europe and Oceania ===
In the United Kingdom, "What Do You Mean?" debuted at the top of the UK Singles Chart for the week ending September 10, 2015, with a combined sales total of 84,000 units. It surpassed his previous best sales week of 55,000, which "Boyfriend" had sold in April 2012, and marked Bieber's first chart-topping song in Britain. The track broke the highest first-week streams record in the country with 3.2 million streams, surpassing the stream tally of 2.03 million set by One Direction's "Drag Me Down". In its second week, the song descended to number two, however, it broke the country's all-time streaming record, with 3.87 million streams in seven days, later surpassed by Adele's "Hello" (which streamed 7.32 million times in November 2015, almost doubling the record). After three weeks since its release, the song remained as the most streamed track in the country and returned to the number one spot for another two weeks. On October 2, the song was knocked off the top spot by Sam Smith's "Writing's on the Wall", but a week later, it returned to the number one spot for another two weeks. This means that it has spent five non-consecutive weeks at number one in the UK Singles Chart. Bieber became only the fourth person to have the same single reach number one on the UK Singles Chart on three separate occasions. The other songs to top the chart three separate times are Frankie Laine's "I Believe", Guy Mitchell's "Singing the Blues" and Pharrell Williams' "Happy". "What Do You Mean?" was the ninth best-selling single of 2015 in the UK with combined sales of 988,000 copies.

In Australia, "What Do You Mean" debuted atop the ARIA Singles Chart on September 5, becoming Bieber's first number-one single on the chart. The song spent four consecutive weeks on top of the chart, becoming the second-longest running chart-topping track for 2015 and gaining a platinum certification from the Australian Recording Industry Association. On October 3, Bieber was knocked off the top by Macklemore & Ryan Lewis's "Downtown". "What Do You Mean" also debuted at the top of the charts in both New Zealand and Ireland, becoming his first number-one single in both countries. It spent seven consecutive weeks at number one in Ireland, and eight consecutive weeks at number one in New Zealand.

== Music video ==
A lyric video for "What Do You Mean?", directed by Laban and featuring skateboarders Ryan Sheckler and Chelsea Castro, was released on August 28, 2015. The music video, directed by Brad Furman and starring John Leguizamo and Xenia Deli, premiered on August 30, 2015, following the 2015 MTV Video Music Awards. As of July 2025, the video has amassed over 2.2 billion views on YouTube, making it one of the 60 most viewed music videos on the site.

=== Synopsis ===
The video starts off with a man (played by John Leguizamo) waiting at a stop sign in front of a motel in the rain. A dark hooded figure (revealed to be Justin Bieber) walks to the man. It is realized that Bieber is in debt to him, and then gives him money and is promised to do one job: protect a girl (played by Xenia Deli), who is his love interest, as Bieber then walks away. As the song begins, it cuts to a neon-lighted hotel room, where the girl that was mentioned earlier is. Bieber knocks on the door, is let in, and they end up having sex. As Bieber sings the second verse of the song, a group of masked men burst in. They tie, then kidnap the two. It then cuts to the pair tied up in an abandoned warehouse. They eventually use a lighter to burn the rope and escape. When the masked men discover they've escaped they chase after them. They open a door, only to find themselves peering at the road below. With the men nearing, Bieber jumps out, then the girl. They land safely on an inflatable mat. Leguizamo reveals himself to be the leader of the masked men, as he's greeted by Bieber. They're now in an underground skating party, as Bieber sings the rest of the song. The video ends with Bieber standing alone in the dark, in the skatepark.

=== Purpose: The Movement version ===
A second music video was released on November 14, 2015, part of a series of short films commemorating the release of the album, entitled "Purpose: The Movement". The short music video, like the video for "Sorry", features the dancers from ReQuest Dance Crew and The Royal Family dance crew, and was also directed and choreographed by Parris Goebel.

== Live performances ==
Bieber performed "What Do You Mean?" live for the first time at the 2015 MTV Video Music Awards on August 30, 2015. He performed the track on The Tonight Show Starring Jimmy Fallon, accompanied by The Roots and featuring a guest verse from Black Thought. Bieber also performed "What Do You Mean?" on The Today Show along with 5 other songs from his album Purpose: "Sorry", "Love Yourself", "The Feeling", "No Pressure" and "Company" (which was performed for the first time). The song was performed on the telecast Think It Up! which was broadcast on September 11. "What Do You Mean?" was performed at the 2015 MTV Europe Music Awards on October 25. And he performed the song at the NRJ Music Awards 2015 in Cannes, France on 7 November 2015. Moreover, the song was also included on the set list for the Purpose World Tour.

== Track listing ==
Digital download
No.	Title	Length
1.	"What Do You Mean?"	3:26
2.	"What Do You Mean? (Alison Wonderland Remix)"	3:30

CD single
No.	Title	Length
1.	"What Do You Mean?"	3:26
2.	"What Do You Mean?" (Instrumental)	3:26
Total length:		6:52

== Charts ==
=== Weekly charts ===
Chart (2015–2016)	Peak position
Australia (ARIA)	1
Austria (Ö3 Austria Top 40)	1
Belgium (Ultratop 50 Flanders)	3
Belgium (Ultratop 50 Wallonia)	2
Canada Hot 100 (Billboard)	1
Canada CHR/Top 40 (Billboard)	1
Canada AC (Billboard)	8
Canada Hot AC (Billboard)	5
CIS Airplay (TopHit)	8
Czech Republic Airplay (ČNS IFPI)	86
Czech Republic Singles Digital (ČNS IFPI)	1
Denmark (Tracklisten)	1
Euro Digital Song Sales (Billboard)	1
Finland (Suomen virallinen lista)	1
France (SNEP)	2
Germany (GfK)	4
Greece Digital Songs (Billboard)	1
Hungary (Rádiós Top 40)	28
Hungary (Single Top 40)	1
Hungary (Stream Top 40)	1
Iceland (RÚV)	3
Ireland (IRMA)	1
Israel International Airplay (Media Forest)	2
Italy (FIMI)	2
Japan Hot 100 (Billboard)	13
Lebanon (Lebanese Top 20)	6
Mexico Airplay (Billboard)	2
Mexico Streaming (AMPROFON)	2
Mexico Anglo (Monitor Latino)	1
Netherlands (Dutch Top 40)	1
Netherlands (Single Top 100)	1
New Zealand (Recorded Music NZ)	1
Norway (VG-lista)	1
Portugal Digital Song Sales (Billboard)	1
Romania TV Airplay (Media Forest)	5
Russia Airplay (TopHit)	9
Scottish Singles Sales (Official Charts)	1
Slovakia Singles Digital (ČNS IFPI)	1
Slovenia (SloTop50)	26
South Africa Airplay (EMA)	1
South Korea International (Gaon Digital Chart)	7
Spain (Promusicae)	3
Sweden (Sverigetopplistan)	1
Switzerland (Schweizer Hitparade)	2
UK Singles (Official Charts)	1
US Billboard Hot 100	1
US Adult Contemporary (Billboard)	14
US Adult Pop Airplay (Billboard)	8
US Dance Club Songs (Billboard)	1
US Dance Airplay (Billboard)	1
US Pop Airplay (Billboard)	1
US Rhythmic Airplay (Billboard)	3

Chart (2026)	Peak position
France (SNEP)	157
Global 200 (Billboard)	42
Greece International (IFPI)	49
Panama Streaming (PRODUCE)	174
Philippines Hot 100 (Billboard Philippines)	52
Slovakia Singles Digital (ČNS IFPI)	71
Taiwan (Billboard)	20

=== Year-end charts ===
Chart (2015)	Position
Australia (ARIA)	9
Austria (Ö3 Austria Top 40)	47
Belgium (Ultratop Flanders)	46
Belgium (Ultratop Wallonia)	56
Canada (Canadian Hot 100)	19
CIS (Tophit)	145
Germany (Official German Charts)	42
Hungary (Single Top 40)	41
Israel (Media Forest)	42
Italy (FIMI)	17
Japan (Japan Hot 100)	87
Netherlands (Dutch Top 40)	19
Netherlands (Single Top 100)	10
New Zealand (Recorded Music NZ)	11
Russia Airplay (Tophit)	140
Spain (PROMUSICAE)	20
Sweden (Sverigetopplistan)	10
Switzerland (Schweizer Hitparade)	37
Tokyo Hot 100 (J-Wave)	4
UK Singles (OCC)	9
US Billboard Hot 100	33
US Dance Club Songs (Billboard)	35
US Dance/Mix Show Airplay (Billboard)	39
US Mainstream Top 40 (Billboard)	33
US Rhythmic (Billboard)	43
Chart (2016)	Position
Australia (ARIA)	68
Belgium (Ultratop Flanders)	97
Canada (Canadian Hot 100)	19
Denmark (Tracklisten)	42
Italy (FIMI)	36
Japan (Japan Hot 100)	46
Netherlands (Dutch Top 40)	99
Netherlands (Single Top 100)	33
New Zealand (Recorded Music NZ)	29
Spain (PROMUSICAE)	38
Sweden (Sverigetopplistan)	55
Switzerland (Schweizer Hitparade)	60
UK Singles (OCC)	35
US Billboard Hot 100	31
US Adult Contemporary (Billboard)	31
Chart (2017)	Position
Japan (Japan Hot 100)	21

=== Decade-end charts ===
Chart (2010–2019)	Position
Australia (ARIA)	82
Netherlands (Single Top 100)	22
UK Singles (Official Charts Company)	29
US Billboard Hot 100	86

=== All-time charts ===
Chart (1958–2018)	Position
US Billboard Hot 100	578

== Certifications ==
Certifications for "What Do You Mean?"
Region	Certification	Certified units/sales
Australia (ARIA)	11× Platinum	770,000^{‡}
Belgium (BRMA)	2× Platinum	40,000^{‡}
Brazil (Pro-Música Brasil)	4× Diamond	1,000,000^{‡}
Canada (Music Canada)	Diamond	800,000^{‡}
Denmark (IFPI Danmark)	5× Platinum	450,000^{‡}
France (SNEP)	Platinum	133,333^{‡}
Germany (BVMI)	Platinum	400,000^{‡}
Italy (FIMI)	6× Platinum	300,000^{‡}
Japan (RIAJ) Digital single	Platinum	250,000^{*}
Mexico (AMPROFON)	4× Platinum+Gold	270,000^{‡}
New Zealand (RMNZ)	7× Platinum	210,000^{‡}
Norway (IFPI Norway)	4× Platinum	240,000^{‡}
Poland (ZPAV)	Diamond	100,000^{‡}
Portugal (AFP)	2× Platinum	40,000^{‡}
Spain (Promusicae)	3× Platinum	120,000^{‡}
Sweden (GLF)	8× Platinum	320,000^{‡}
United Kingdom (BPI)	5× Platinum	3,000,000^{‡}
United States (RIAA)	8× Platinum	8,000,000^{‡}
Streaming
Greece (IFPI Greece)	Gold	1,000,000^{†}
Japan (RIAJ)	Platinum	100,000,000^{†}
^{*} Sales figures based on certification alone.^{‡} Sales+streaming figures based on certification alone.^{†} Streaming-only figures based on certification alone.

== Release history ==
Country	Date	Format	Label	Ref.
Various	August 28, 2015	Digital download	Def Jam	
United States	September 1, 2015	Contemporary hit radio	Def Jam	
Italy	September 4, 2015	Contemporary hit radio	RBMG; Def Jam	
Germany	October 9, 2015	CD single	Def Jam; Universal	

== See also ==
- List of best-selling singles in Australia
- List of Billboard Hot 100 number-one singles of 2015
- List of number-one dance singles of 2015 (U.S.)
- List of number-one singles of 2015 (Australia)
- List of number-one singles of 2015 (South Africa)
- List of UK Singles Chart number ones of the 2010s
