= Shontelle discography =

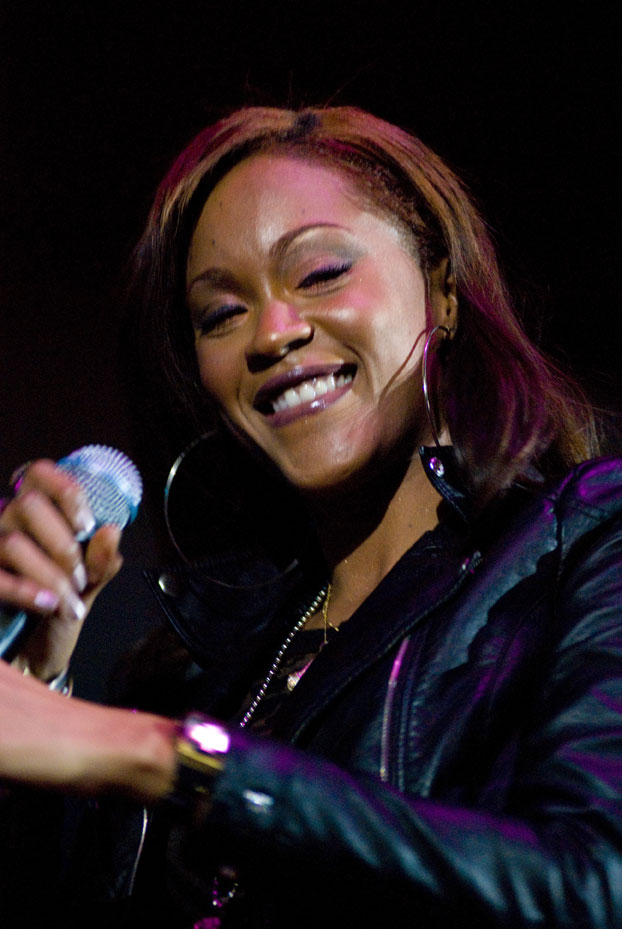
- Shontelle in 2008
- Studio albums: 2
- Singles: 8
- Music videos: 10

The discography of Barbadian R&B and pop singer Shontelle contains two studio albums, five singles and ten music videos.

Shontelle's debut album, Shontelligence, was released on November 18, 2008. The album reached number 115 on the Billboard 200, selling 6,200 records in its first week, and reached number twenty-four on the R&B/Hip-Hop Albums chart. It was re-released on March 10, 2009, and has since sold 30,000 records in the US. "T-Shirt", was the first and debut single released by Shontelle, it was released in July 2008 and reached number thirty-six on the Billboard Hot 100, becoming a moderate hit. However, it reached the top ten in the United Kingdom, peaking at number six there. The second single from the album, "Stuck with Each Other", featuring Akon, was released in February 2009 in the US and May 2009 in the UK. The single failed to chart in the US, but reached number twenty-three in the United Kingdom.

Shontelle's second album, No Gravity, was released in the US on September 21, 2010. In the first week of release, No Gravity placed at number 81 on the Billboard 200, selling 7,000 copies. The lead single from the album, "Impossible", was released in February 2010 for digital download, but failed to garner success until May 2010, when it debuted on the Billboard Hot 100. It has since become her most successful single to date, reaching number thirteen on the Billboard Hot 100. The second single from the album, "Perfect Nightmare", was released in August 2010. "Say Hello to Goodbye" was released to pop radio on March 15 as the third single. On March 14, 2020, Shontelle released "Remember Me" for digital download.

== Albums ==
=== Studio albums ===
List of albums, with selected chart positions
Title	Album details	Peak chart positions			
Title	Album details	UK	US	US R&B	US Heat
Shontelligence	Released: November 18, 2008; Label: SRC; Formats: CD, digital download	147 (Note: "Shontelligence" also peaked at number 59 on the UK Album Downloads Chart and number 17 on the UK Hip Hop & R&B Albums Chart.)	115	24	3
No Gravity	Released: September 21, 2010; Label: SRC; Formats: CD, digital download	— (Note: "No Gravity" did not enter the UK Albums Chart, but peaked at number 23 on the UK Hip Hop & R&B Albums Chart.)	81	—	—
Tokyo Nights	Released: July 11, 2024; Label: self-released; Formats: digital download	—	—	—	—
"—" denotes album that did not chart or was not released.

=== Extended plays ===
- Boomerang (2022)

== Singles ==
=== As lead artist ===
List of singles, with selected chart positions
Title	Year	Peak chart positions										Certifications	Album
Title	Year	AUT	BEL	CAN	DEN	IRE	NZ	NOR	UK	US	US Pop	Certifications	Album
"T-Shirt"	2008	—	7	41	—	26	—	—	6	36	15	UK: Platinum	Shontelligence
"Stuck with Each Other" (featuring Akon)	2009	—	—	—	—	46	—	—	23	—	—		Shontelligence
"Battle Cry"	2009	—	—	—	—	—	—	—	61	—	—		Shontelligence
"Impossible"	2010	66	70	33	5	28	24	16	9	13	9	US: Platinum; DEN: Gold; UK: Silver	No Gravity
"Perfect Nightmare"	2010	—	—	—	—	—	—	—	148	—	40		No Gravity
"Say Hello to Goodbye"	2011	—	—	—	—	—	—	—	—	—	30		No Gravity
"Remember Me"	2020	—	—	—	—	—	—	—	—	—	—		Non-album singles
"Tomorrow"	2021	—	—	—	—	—	—	—	—	—	—		Non-album singles
"House Party"	2021	—	—	—	—	—	—	—	—	—	—		Non-album singles
"—" denotes single that did not chart or was not released.

=== Promotional singles ===
Year	Title	Album	
2009	"Licky (Under the Covers)"	No Gravity	
2010	"Merry Christmas to Me"	Non-album singles	
2012	"Freaky" (featuring Gyptian)	Non-album singles	
2013	"Stop Sign" (with Angelique Sabrina)	Non-album singles	
2016	"Count on Me" (with Toni Norville)	Non-album singles	
2022	"Sanctify"	Non-album singles	Boomerang
2022	"Be the One"		Boomerang
2022	"Boomerang"		Boomerang
2022	"No More"	Non-album single	

=== As featured artist ===
List of singles, with selected chart positions
Year	Single	Peak chart positions			Album
Year	Single	FIN	GER	SWI	Album
2007	"Roll It" (J-Status featuring Rihanna and Shontelle)	8	33	89	The Beginning
2012	"Tonight" (Timati featuring Shontelle)	—	—	—	SWAGG
2013	"Perfect Day" (DJ Antoine featuring B-Case and Shontelle)	—	—	29	Sky Is the Limit
2013	"Stop Sign" (Angelique Sabrina featuring Shontelle)	—	—	—	Non-album single
2013	"Gal Wan More" (Elephant Man featuring Shontelle)	—	—	—	Out of Control (hosted by DJ Hidrro)
2013	"Don't Call Me" (DMX with Rakim featuring Aleks D. and Shontelle)	—	—	—	Non-album singles
2021	"Let You Go" (Supasoaka featuring Shontelle and Arpad)	—	—	—	Non-album singles
2021	"Find My Way (Remix)" (Meg and the Miracles featuring Shontelle)	—	—	—	Non-album singles
2023	"Lost Souls" (Shiah Maisel featuring Shontelle)	—	—	—	Non-album singles
"—" denotes single that did not chart or was not released.

== Music videos ==
List of Shontelle's music videos as main or featured artist, showing year released and director
Year	Song	Director
2007	"Roll It" (J-Status featuring Rihanna & Shontelle)	
2008	"T-Shirt"	Mike Ruiz
2009	"Stuck with Each Other" (Shontelle featuring Akon)	
2009	"Battle Cry"	Jessy Terrero
2010	"Licky (Under the Covers)"	Ray Kay
2010	"Impossible"	Taj Stansberry
2010	"Perfect Nightmare"	Colin Tilley
2011	"Say Hello to Goodbye"	Armen Djerrahian
2013	"Stop Sign" (Angelique Sabrina featuring Shontelle)	Date Resteghini
2013	"I’m in love" (Kato featuring Shontelle)	-
2021	"Sanctify"	Bjørnar Strømsholm
2022	"House Party" (Remix)	Audran Sarzier
2024	"Emotions"	Dương Khắc Linh
