= AOL AIM presents: Jason Derülo =

2010–11 concert tour by Jason Derulo

- Tour by Jason Derulo
- Associated album: Jason Derülo
- Start date: August 19, 2010
- End date: March 1, 2011
- Legs: 4
- No. of shows: 25 in Europe; 25 in North America; 9 in Australia; 59 Total

Jason Derulo concert chronology
- AOL AIM presents: Jason Derülo (2010-11); Tattoos World Tour (2014)

AOL AIM presents: Jason Derülo is the debut concert tour by American recording artist, Jason Derulo (at the time using the ü letter in his stage name). The tour supports his first studio album, Jason Derülo. It was sponsored by AOL's Instant Messenger. The tour stopped in Europe, North America and Australasia.

== Opening acts ==
- Auburn (North America, select dates)
- Trinity (Australasia)
- Morgan Joanel (Australasia, select dates)
- Shontelle (Europe—Leg 2)
- Mindless Behavior (Europe—Leg 2)
- Brian Cade (Fresno)
- Super Mash Bros (Lawrenceville)
- J. Williams (Auckland)

== Setlist ==
The following setlist is obtained from the September 29, 2010, concert at the Kneller Auditorium in Worcester, Massachusetts. It does not represents all concerts during the tour.

1. "The Sky's the Limit"
2. "Whatcha Say"
3. "Love Hangover"
4. "Instrumental Sequence" (contains elements of "I Gotta Feeling")
5. "Ridin' Solo"
6. "In My Head"
7. "Fallen"
8. "Blind"
9. "What If"
10. "Performance Sequence"
11. "Billie Jean"

Encore

12. "Ridin' Solo" / "In My Head" (Reprise)

== Tour dates ==
Date	City	Country	Venue
Europe
August 19, 2010	London	England	O_{2} Shepherds Bush Empire
August 21, 2010^{[A]}	Chelmsford	England	Hylands Park
August 22, 2010^{[A]}	Weston-under-Lizard	England	Weston Park
August 23, 2010	Manchester	England	Manchester Academy
August 24, 2010	Edinburgh	Scotland	Picture House
August 26, 2010	Dublin	Ireland	The Academy
September 15, 2010	Hamburg	Germany	Docks
September 16, 2010	Berlin	Germany	Astra Kulturhaus
September 18, 2010	Munich	Germany	Café Muffathalle
September 19, 2010	Cologne	Germany	Essigfabrik
September 20, 2010	Amsterdam	Netherlands	Paradiso
September 22, 2010	Brussels	Belgium	Ancienne Belgique
September 23, 2010	Paris	France	Élysée Montmartre
September 25, 2010^{[B]}	London	England	Wembley Arena
North America
September 27, 2010	Philadelphia	United States	Theatre of Living Arts
September 28, 2010	Boston	United States	House of Blues
September 29, 2010	Worcester	United States	Kneller Auditorium
September 30, 2010	New York City	United States	Best Buy Theater
October 1, 2010	Baltimore	United States	Rams Head Live!
October 3, 2010	Chicago	United States	House of Blues
October 5, 2010	Pontiac	United States	Clutch Cargo's
October 6, 2010	Allendale	United States	GVSU Fieldhouse
October 8, 2010	Indiana	United States	MPC Ohio Performance Space
October 9, 2010	Milwaukee	United States	Rave Hall
October 10, 2010	Minneapolis	United States	First Avenue
October 12, 2010	Orem	United States	UCCU Center
October 13, 2010	Seattle	United States	Moore Theatre
October 14, 2010	Portland	United States	Roseland Theater
October 15, 2010	San Francisco	United States	Regency Ballroom
October 16, 2010^{[C]}	Fresno	United States	Paul Paul Theatre
October 18, 2010	West Hollywood	United States	House of Blues
October 20, 2010^{[D]}	Phoenix	United States	Arizona Veterans Memorial Coliseum
October 21, 2010^{[E]}	Lexington	United States	Memorial Coliseum
October 22, 2010	Lawrenceville	United States	Alumni Gymnasium
October 23, 2010	Houston	United States	Warehouse Live
October 25, 2010	Dallas	United States	House of Blues
October 27, 2010	Atlanta	United States	Center Stage Theater
October 28, 2010	Tampa	United States	The Ritz Ybor
October 29, 2010	Fairfield	United States	Alumni Hall
Oceania
November 2, 2010	Perth	Australia	Challenge Stadium
November 4, 2010	Adelaide	Australia	Adelaide Entertainment Centre
November 5, 2010	Melbourne	Australia	Festival Hall
November 6, 2010	Melbourne	Australia	Festival Hall
November 9, 2010	Sydney	Australia	Hordern Pavilion
November 10, 2010	Sydney	Australia	Hordern Pavilion
November 11, 2010	Brisbane	Australia	BCEC Great Hall
November 13, 2010	Brisbane	Australia	BCEC Great Hall
November 15, 2010	Auckland	New Zealand	Logan Campbell Centre
Europe
December 4, 2010^{[F]}	Dublin	Ireland	The O_{2}
February 17, 2011	Bournemouth	England	Windsor Hall
February 18, 2011	Wolverhampton	England	Wolverhampton Civic Hall
February 19, 2011	Leeds	England	O_{2} Academy Leeds
February 21, 2011	Derby	England	Derby Assembly Rooms
February 22, 2011	Newcastle	England	O_{2} Academy Newcastle
February 23, 2011	Glasgow	Scotland	O_{2} Academy Glasgow
February 25, 2011	Manchester	England	O_{2} Apollo Manchester
February 26, 2011	Manchester	England	O_{2} Apollo Manchester
February 28, 2011	Cardiff	Wales	Cardiff International Arena
March 1, 2011	London	England	HMV Hammersmith Apollo

Festivals and other miscellaneous performances
^{A} V Festival
^{B} BBC Radio 1Xtra Live
^{C} Table Mountain Concert Series
^{D} Arizona State Fair
^{E} University of Kentucky Homecoming Concert
^{F} ChildLine Concert

Cancellations and rescheduled shows

October 5, 2010	Royal Oak, Michigan	Royal Oak Music Theatre	Moved to Clutch Cargo's in Pontiac, Michigan
November 4, 2010	Adelaide, Australia	Thebarton Theatre	Moved to the Adelaide Entertainment Centre
