= Battle Cry (Shontelle song) =

Single by Shontelle

from the album Shontelligence
- Released: June 9, 2009
- Recorded: 2008
- Genre: R&B
- Length: 3:33 (Album Version); 3:13 (UK Radio Edit)
- Label: SRC/Motown Records
- Songwriters: J. Omley, J. Jones, J. Kugell, J. Pennock, W. Wilkins
- Producers: Wayne Wilkins, The Heavyweights, The Jam

Shontelle singles chronology
"Stuck with Each Other" (2009)	"Battle Cry" (2009)	"Impossible" (2010)

"Battle Cry" is the third and final single released by Barbadian singer Shontelle from her album Shontelligence (2008). It was the third single taken from the album following "T-Shirt" and "Stuck with Each Other". The song was sent to radio as the third single in the US on June 9, 2009 and was released in the UK as a digital single bundle on August 10, 2009.

== Song information ==
"It's a song that's really supposed to unite people, right now there's a lot of drama going on in the world, so this is a song that's really supposed to relax everybody and remind us that we should stick together. Make love, not war!"
— Shontelle speaking to Digital Spy backstage at the Capital FM Summer Ball in London in 2009.

Shontelle has since announced on her official Twitter page that "Battle Cry" will still be released as the album's third single, stating that "Battle Cry is up next baby!".

The song was released as a promo single in the U.S. on October 21, 2008, for the Barack Obama compilation album. The song was accompanied with a music video featuring Shontelle and various clips in tribute to President Obama. The song failed to chart in the United States. Nearly a year later, on June 9, 2009, the song was released in the US as the third single from the album, and right before its release the official video was filmed, and has been released in the UK, and was released in the US in July, 2009.

Speaking of the song's background in February 2009 to noted UK R&B writer Pete Lewis of the award-winning Blues & Soul, Shontelle stated: "While I always loved 'Battle Cry' in its own right as a power anthem and for its really inspirational theme, for me the coolest thing about it now is that we actually got a call from Barack Obama's people saying they'd heard the song, they felt its theme really suited their campaign, and that they'd love to feature it on their fundraising record 'Yes We Can; Voices Of A Grass Roots Movement'! You know, as soon as they told me that, I was like 'You don't even have to ASK! You can use ANY of my songs for ANYTHING to do with Barack Obama!'!"

== Music video ==
In October 2008 Shontelle released a "Battle Cry" tribute video for Barack Obama on YouTube as it was featured on the compilation album Yes We Can: Voices of Grass Roots Movement.

In May 2009, she shot the official music video for the single release in Los Angeles with video director Jessy Terrero. On June 26, Shontelle's official music video for Battle Cry premiered on her official fansite.

== Track listings ==
UK Digital Single

1. "Battle Cry" (UK Radio Edit)
2. "Battle Cry" (Ill Blu Remix)

UK Digital Single EP

1. "Battle Cry" (UK Radio Edit)
2. "Battle Cry" (Ill Blu Remix)
3. "Battle Cry" (Lee Hazard Mix)

== Charts ==
Chart (2009)	Peak position
UK Singles (OCC)	61
UK Hip Hop/R&B (OCC)	21

== Radio and release history ==
Region	Date	Format
United States	October 21, 2008 (promo)	Digital download
United States	June 9, 2009	Airplay
United Kingdom	August 10, 2009	Digital download
