= Soca Queen =

Studio album by Alison Hinds
- Released: 16 October 2007
- Recorded: 2007
- Genre: Soca, dancehall, reggae, R&B
- Length: 60:27
- Label: 1720 Entertainment/Black Coral
- Producer: Salaam Remi, Van Gibbs, Chris Allman

Alison Hinds chronology
| Soca Queen (2007) | Caribbean Queen (2010) |

Soca Queen is the debut album by soca musician Alison Hinds. It was released on physical formats in Canada on 16 October 2007, having been made available on iTunes on 9 October. It was released in the Caribbean later that year.

The album features the hit single "Roll It Gal", and includes the songs "Ladies Rule" and "Faluma", which date from Hinds' time as singer of the band Square One. "Thundah" was also released as a single. Kelefa Sanneh of The New York Times described it as "a winsome CD, full of breezy songs that emphasize the genre's links to both Afro-pop (those bass lines!) and Euro-trance (those synthesizers!)".

== Track listing ==
1. "The More You Get" - 4:38
2. "Faluma" - 3:55
3. "Roll It Gal" - 3:58
4. "Thundah" - 3:25
5. "Blazin'" - 4:44
6. "Island Girl" - 4:20
7. "Caution" - 3:56
8. "Ladies Rule" - 4:18
9. "My Space" - 4:05
10. "Good Morning" - 3:33
11. "The Show" - 3:40
12. "In the Name of Love" - 4:17
13. "Soca Nation" - 3:46
14. "Togetherness" - 4:20
15. "Roll It Gal" (Rishi Rich Remix) - 3:26
