= Impossible (Shontelle song) =

2010 single by Shontelle

Single by Shontelle

from the album No Gravity
- Released: February 9, 2010
- Recorded: 2009
- Studio: Chalice Recording Studios, Los Angeles, California, U.S.; The Vault, Stockholm, Sweden
- Genre: R&B
- Length: 3:47
- Label: SRC; Motown
- Songwriters: Arnthor Birgisson; Ina Wroldsen
- Producer: Arnthor Birgisson

Shontelle singles chronology
| "Battle Cry" (2009) | "Impossible" (2010) | "Perfect Nightmare" (2010) |

Music video
- Impossible on YouTube

"Impossible" is a song by Barbadian singer Shontelle. It is the lead single from her second studio album, No Gravity (2010). The song was written by Arnthor Birgisson and Ina Wroldsen, and produced by Birgisson. It was released digitally on February 9, 2010. "Impossible" peaked at number 13 on the Billboard Hot 100 in the United States, number 33 in Canada, number nine in the United Kingdom and number five in Denmark.

The X Factor winner James Arthur released a cover version of the song after winning the ninth series of the talent competition in December 2012. It was released shortly after his win and reached number one in the UK and Ireland, as well as charting in the top ten in 20 other countries. As of 2021, it has sold 1,940,010 copies in the UK.

The international symphonic metal band Exit Eden released their cover version of the song in 2017 for their album Rhapsodies in Black via Starwatch Entertainment and Napalm Records. The song was accompanied by an official music video and a live video.

== Inspiration and composition ==
"Impossible" is a midtempo R&B ballad written by Arnthor Birgisson and Ina Wroldsen, in the musical key of A♭ major with a time signature in common time and a tempo of 92 beats per minute. The melody is to be played in a moderate tone and tempo. The song's backing track consists of a simple chord progression of Fm^{7}—A♭—E♭—D♭. It was conceived after Shontelle stated that she felt that radio was currently missing a "heartbreak ballad". In an interview with J-14 magazine she said "I knew that there was no song out there for heartbroken people. I just wanted to put a song out that gave people hope – things may not work out the way you want them to, but you can move past it and everything is gonna be okay... [I want to help listeners] draw the strength to carry on past a break up where you're the one in the embarrassing position." Shontelle uses a vocal range from E♭^{3} to D♭^{5} in the song. Billboard's Michael Menachem described her vocal precision as similar to that of Beyoncé's in "Irreplaceable". Meanwhile, the production, helmed by Birgisson, was compared to Norwegian production team, StarGate who are, coincidentally, the team responsible for producing "Irreplaceable".

== Reception ==
=== Critical response ===
Michael Menachem of Billboard loved the song. He said "Shontelle shines on 'Impossible', giving one of the year's standout female vocal performances and recalling the poignancy and technical precision of Beyoncé's "Irreplaceable". The 24-year-old's vulnerable delivery demands attention ... releasing the pain of a broken heart... Nothing is impossible when a vocal sounds as effortless and anthemic as this." Ryan Love of Digital Spy gave the song five out of five stars, writing: "Arnthor Birgisson's StarGate-style production is appealingly restrained, Ina Wroldsen's lyrics are blunt and utterly relatable, and Shontelle gives her strongest vocal performance yet without ever overdoing it. The result? A treat for everyone except the people at Greenpeace, who might not approve of a song that requires at least two Kleenex mansize every time you play it." Financial website MarketWatch branded the song a "passionate ballad" and Shontelle's vocals "soulful".

Carmen Castro of The Canadian Press said "Shontelle hits the right notes on "Impossible", the album's only standout track." A reviewer from Entertainment Focus said "'Impossible' showcases undeniably strong vocals from the 24-year-old. ... It's easily a contender for breakup song of 2010 and Shontelle sings with such passion that you can't help but hold back the tears. Things are about to turn around for Shontelle. 'Impossible' is the strongest release we've had from the young singer yet and it's a sign of bigger things to come." Meanwhile Bill Lamb of about.com said "Shontelle delivers a strong, emotional R&B ballad. This smooth soul sound provides a valuable counterpart to the dominant uptempo dance music on current pop radio."

=== Chart performance ===
"Impossible" made its US Mainstream Top 40 chart debut at number 40 on 1 May 2010, two months after the song was first released. The following week it debuted on the Billboard Hot 100, at number 88. It continued to rise up both charts, before eventually peaking at number nine on the US Pop Songs chart, number eleven on the Hot Digital Songs chart and number thirteen on the Billboard Hot 100. Consequently, it is Shontelle's most successful single in the United States. On 27 August 2010, "Impossible" was certified platinum by the Recording Industry Association of America (RIAA), for selling one million copies.

"Impossible" equalled its US success in the United Kingdom, peaking at number three on the UK R&B Chart and number nine on the UK Singles Chart. It became Shontelle's second top-ten hit and her best chart peak since her 2009 debut single "T-Shirt" which reached number six. It was also the only newly released track to reach the top-twenty that week, selling 22,292 copies according to Music Week. Additionally it achieved some success in Europe too, reaching number five in Denmark, fifteen on the Slovakia Airplay chart and number twenty in Norway. It also peaked in Canada at number 33. It was certified gold by the International Federation of the Phonographic Industry (IFPI) in Denmark, for selling 15,000 copies.

On 16 December 2012, "Impossible" re-entered the UK Singles Chart at number 22 after James Arthur won The X Factor and released the song as his winner's single.

== Music video ==
The official video was directed by Taj Stansberry, Represented by Leah Harmony and Ciarra Pardo. It premiered on 14 April 2010 and according to 92.3 Now FM's Ed Easton, the video is "a great visualization of her struggles, professionally and personally." In the video, singer Steph Jones plays Shontelle's love interest. The video opens with Shontelle entering an apartment at 12:14 p.m. The video is a reflection of the past. During the first chorus, Shontelle is talking to her boyfriend and they start caressing. In the second chorus, Shontelle and her boyfriend are arguing while Shontelle is also shown writing lyrics to the song and scribbling off words. Later, her boyfriend is having a beer at a party. He is celebrating his platinum success. Afterwards, Shontelle receives a letter from a recording studio, and realizes her own dreams are coming second to her boyfriends. Later, she is putting away glasses and bottles. At the end, a reflection is shown in black and white. The final scene is kissing her boyfriend on the head, taking the demo CD he made for her and leaving him. It then goes back to the present, where Shontelle is getting into a taxi while her boyfriend sleeps on the sofa.

== Live performances ==
Shontelle performed the song at the NewNowNext Awards televised on digital cable television channel Logo. The event marked her first live performance on television.

== Track listing ==
- Digital download
1. "Impossible" – 3:46
2. "Impossible" (Jonas Jeberg Remix) – 3:11
3. "Impossible" (Smasher Remix) – 4:36
4. "Impossible" (Superdef & Jecto Remix) – 7:18

== Credits ==
"Impossible" was recorded at Chalice Recording Studios in Los Angeles, California and The Vault in Stockholm, Sweden.

- Songwriting – Arnthor Birgisson, Ina Wroldsen
- Record producer and programmer – Arnthor Birgisson
- Recording engineer – Chris Kesychs
- Mixing – Phil Tan, Damien Lewis (assistant)
- Guitars – Esbjörn Öhrwall
- Lead vocals – Shontelle Layne
- Background vocals – Ina Wroldsen

== Charts ==
=== Weekly charts ===
| Chart (2010–12) | Peak position |
|---|---|
| Austria (Ö3 Austria Top 40) | 66 |
| Belgium (Ultratip Bubbling Under Flanders) | 20 |
| Belgium (Ultratip Bubbling Under Wallonia) | 42 |
| Brazil Hot 100 Airplay (Billboard) | 23 |
| Canada Hot 100 (Billboard) | 33 |
| Czech Republic Airplay (ČNS IFPI) | 46 |
| Denmark (Tracklisten) | 5 |
| European Hot 100 Singles (Billboard) | 28 |
| Hungary (Rádiós Top 40) | 27 |
| Ireland (IRMA) | 28 |
| New Zealand (Recorded Music NZ) | 24 |
| Norway (VG-lista) | 16 |
| Scottish Singles Sales (Official Charts) | 11 |
| Slovakia Airplay (ČNS IFPI) | 15 |
| UK Singles (Official Charts) | 9 |
| UK Hip Hop/R&B (Official Charts) | 3 |
| US Billboard Hot 100 | 13 |
| US Pop Airplay (Billboard) | 9 |

=== Year-end charts ===
| Chart (2010) | Position |
|---|---|
| Denmark (Tracklisten) | 50 |
| UK Singles (Official Charts Company) | 145 |
| US Billboard Hot 100 | 70 |
| US Mainstream Top 40 (Billboard) | 42 |

== Certifications ==
| Region | Certification | Certified units/sales |
|---|---|---|
| Brazil (Pro-Música Brasil) | Platinum | 60,000^{‡} |
| Denmark (IFPI Danmark) | Gold | 15,000^{^} |
| United Kingdom (BPI) | Gold | 400,000^{‡} |
| United States (RIAA) | Platinum | 1,000,000^{*} |
^{*} Sales figures based on certification alone.^{^} Shipments figures based on certification alone.^{‡} Sales+streaming figures based on certification alone.

== Radio and release history ==
=== Radio adds ===
| Region | Date | Format |
|---|---|---|
| United States | 2 February 2010 | Top 40/Mainstream |
| United States | 18 May 2010 | Rhythmic/Crossover |

=== Release history ===
| Region | Date | Format | Label |
|---|---|---|---|
| Canada | 9 February 2010 | Digital download | Universal |
| Denmark | 9 February 2010 | Digital download | Universal |
| Ireland | 9 February 2010 | Digital download | Universal |
| United States | 9 February 2010 | Digital download | SRC |
| Belgium | 15 February 2010 | Digital download | Universal |
| Netherlands | 15 February 2010 | Digital download | Universal |
| Norway | 15 February 2010 | Digital download | Universal |
| Sweden | 15 February 2010 | Digital download | Universal |
| Switzerland | 15 February 2010 | Digital download | Universal |
| United Kingdom | 9 September 2010 | Digital download | Island |

== James Arthur version ==
"Impossible"

Single by James Arthur

from the album James Arthur
- Released: 9 December 2012
- Recorded: 2012
- Genre: R&B; pop
- Length: 3:29
- Label: Syco; Sony
- Songwriters: Arnthor Birgisson; Ina Wroldsen
- Producers: Graham Stack; Matt Furmidge

James Arthur singles chronology
| "Impossible" (2012) | "You're Nobody 'til Somebody Loves You" (2013) |

James Arthur, the winner of the ninth series of The X Factor, released a cover version of "Impossible" digitally on 9 December 2012, immediately after winning the show. The CD single was released on 12 December 2012. Profits from each download were expected to be at least £0.25 and all profits from CD and download sales were to be donated to the charity Together for Short Lives. The charity works with "children with life-threatening and life-limiting conditions." Speaking on the decision to support Together for Short Lives, Simon Cowell creator and executive producer of The X Factor said, "[it] is such an inspiring and important charity for so many kids and their families who really need help and support. I'm delighted that The X Factor's winner single sales will go directly to helping them."

In its first week, the single sold 489,560 copies, making it the UK's fastest-selling single of 2012. The song also peaked at number one in Ireland, number two in both Australia and Switzerland, and number one in Slovakia. As of 2023, the single has sold over 2 million copies in the UK, becoming the biggest-selling single by an X Factor winner.

=== Critical reception ===
Robert Copsey of Digital Spy gave the song a positive review stating, "of course, making such a decision based on his victory single – a cover of Shontelle's 2010 hit 'Impossible' – is a futile exercise. The track, which was once sidelined for former finalist Cher Lloyd, has been drained of its R&B sassiness and re-worked into a swooping ballad, saved only by Arthur's quivering and gutsy vocal. Fortunately for him, at this stage that's the only bit that matters." He gave the song three out of five stars. The song was nominated for "British Single of the Year" at the 2013 BRIT Awards, but lost out to "Skyfall" by Adele.

=== Chart performance and sales ===
In the United Kingdom, "Impossible" sold over 187,000 downloads during its first 24 hours on sale; making Arthur the fastest-selling winner in X Factor history. By the end of the week, the track had sold over 490,000 copies, enough to debut at number-one on the UK Singles Chart; achieving the largest first week sales of the year. After eleven days, "Impossible" had become the seventh biggest-selling debut single from any X Factor contestant, with sales of over 622,000; enough to overtake the lifetime sales of the debut singles of series 8 winners Little Mix ("Cannonball"), series 5 runners-up JLS ("Beat Again") and series 4 winner Leon Jackson ("When You Believe"). In its second charting week, sales of "Impossible" fell to 233,770 copies as it dropped to number two behind "He Ain't Heavy, He's My Brother" from The Justice Collective, the Christmas number one single of 2012. In its third charting week, "Impossible" reclaimed the number-one position; with sales of 183,660 copies. As of 29 December, "Impossible" had sold 896,990 copies, enough to overtake series 3 winner Leona Lewis ("A Moment Like This") and make it the fourth highest-selling single of the nine The X Factor winners; behind series 7 winner Matt Cardle ("When We Collide"), series 2 winner Shayne Ward ("That's My Goal") and series 5 winner Alexandra Burke ("Hallelujah"). On 31 December, it was announced that the track had finished 2012 as the fifth highest-selling single. By February 2013, it had become the second best selling The X Factor winner's single with 1.25 million copies sold. In 2015, it overtook Alexandra Burke's "Hallelujah" to become the best-selling winners single ever.

Arthur's version of "Impossible" was also the best-selling single of 2012 in the Republic of Ireland, where it became the 2012 Christmas number one, with "He Ain't Heavy, He's My Brother" peaking at number four. The track also became a huge success worldwide, topping the charts in the Czech Republic, Greece, Luxembourg and Slovakia. It also reached number two in Australia, New Zealand, Spain and Switzerland, number three in Belgium, number four in Austria, number five in Germany and number six in France and Hungary.

=== Track listing ===
Digital download
| No. | Title | Writer(s) | Length |
|---|---|---|---|
| 1. | "Impossible" | Arnthor Birgisson; Ina Wroldsen | 3:29 |

UK and Irish CD single
| No. | Title | Writer(s) | Length |
|---|---|---|---|
| 1. | "Impossible" | Birgisson; Wroldsen | 3:29 |
| 2. | "Sexy and I Know It" (The X Factor performance) | Stefan Kendal Gordy; Jamahl Listenbee; Erin Beck; George M. Robertson; Kenneth Oliver; Paul Barrett | 3:19 |
| 3. | "Sweet Dreams (Are Made of This)" (The X Factor performance) | Annie Lennox; David A. Stewart | 3:35 |
| 4. | "Hometown Glory" (The X Factor performance) | Adele Adkins | 4:31 |

European CD single
| No. | Title | Writer(s) | Length |
|---|---|---|---|
| 1. | "Impossible" | Birgisson; Wroldsen | 3:27 |
| 2. | "Hometown Glory" | Adkins | 2:21 |

=== Charts ===
==== Weekly charts ====
| Chart (2012–14) | Peak position |
|---|---|
| Australia (ARIA) | 2 |
| Austria (Ö3 Austria Top 40) | 4 |
| Belgium (Ultratop 50 Flanders) | 3 |
| Belgium (Ultratop 50 Wallonia) | 7 |
| Canada Hot 100 (Billboard) | 87 |
| Czech Republic Airplay (ČNS IFPI) | 1 |
| Czech Republic Singles Digital (ČNS IFPI) | 28 |
| Euro Digital Song Sales (Billboard) | 1 |
| France (SNEP) | 6 |
| Germany (GfK) | 5 |
| Greece (IFPI Greece) | 1 |
| Hungary (Single Top 40) | 3 |
| Ireland (IRMA) | 1 |
| Italy (FIMI) | 45 |
| Luxembourg Digital Songs (Billboard) | 1 |
| Netherlands (Single Top 100) | 61 |
| New Zealand (Recorded Music NZ) | 2 |
| Poland Airplay (ZPAV) | 4 |
| Portugal Digital Songs (Billboard) | 5 |
| Romania (Airplay 100) | 14 |
| Russia Airplay (TopHit) | 82 |
| Scottish Singles Sales (Official Charts) | 1 |
| Slovakia Airplay (ČNS IFPI) | 1 |
| Slovenia (SloTop50) | 10 |
| South Korea International Singles (Gaon) | 60 |
| Spain (Promusicae) | 2 |
| Sweden (Sverigetopplistan) | 39 |
| Switzerland (Schweizer Hitparade) | 2 |
| UK Singles (Official Charts) | 1 |
| Ukraine Airplay (TopHit) | 16 |

==== Year-end charts ====
| Chart (2012) | Position |
|---|---|
| UK Singles (Official Charts Company) | 5 |
| Chart (2013) | Position |
| Australia (ARIA) | 10 |
| Austria (Ö3 Austria Top 40) | 15 |
| Belgium (Ultratop Flanders) | 17 |
| Belgium (Ultratop Wallonia) | 16 |
| France (SNEP) | 15 |
| Germany (Media Control AG) | 11 |
| New Zealand (Recorded Music NZ) | 5 |
| Spain (PROMUSICAE) | 10 |
| Sweden (Sverigetopplistan) | 85 |
| Switzerland (Schweizer Hitparade) | 7 |
| UK Singles (Official Charts Company) | 42 |
| Ukraine Airplay (TopHit) | 63 |
| Chart (2014) | Position |
| France (SNEP) | 126 |
| Chart (2022) | Position |
| Hungary (Rádiós Top 40) | 89 |

==== Decade-end charts ====
| Chart (2010–2019) | Position |
|---|---|
| UK Singles (Official Charts Company) | 70 |

=== Certifications ===
| Region | Certification | Certified units/sales |
|---|---|---|
| Australia (ARIA) | 5× Platinum | 350,000^{^} |
| Austria (IFPI Austria) | Gold | 15,000^{*} |
| Belgium (BRMA) | Platinum | 30,000^{*} |
| Brazil (Pro-Música Brasil) | Diamond | 250,000^{‡} |
| Canada (Music Canada) | 3× Platinum | 240,000^{‡} |
| Denmark (IFPI Danmark) | Platinum | 90,000^{‡} |
| France (SNEP) | Gold | 75,000^{*} |
| Germany (BVMI) | 3× Platinum | 900,000^{‡} |
| Italy (FIMI) | Platinum | 50,000^{‡} |
| New Zealand (RMNZ) | 4× Platinum | 60,000^{*} |
| Portugal (AFP) | Platinum | 20,000^{‡} |
| Spain (Promusicae) | Platinum | 60,000^{‡} |
| Sweden (GLF) | Platinum | 40,000^{‡} |
| Switzerland (IFPI Switzerland) | 2× Platinum | 60,000^{^} |
| United Kingdom (BPI) | 4× Platinum | 2,400,000^{‡} |
Streaming
| Spain (Promusicae) | Gold | 4,000,000^{†} |
^{*} Sales figures based on certification alone.^{^} Shipments figures based on certification alone.^{‡} Sales+streaming figures based on certification alone.^{†} Streaming-only figures based on certification alone.

=== Release history ===
| Region | Date | Format | Label |
|---|---|---|---|
| United Kingdom | 9 December 2012 | Digital download | Syco; Sony |
| United Kingdom | 12 December 2012 | CD single | Syco; Sony |
| Germany | 24 May 2013 | CD single | Sony |
