= Morgan Joanel =

Australian singer-songwriter and visual artist

- Born: Perth, Western Australia
- Genres: Indie pop; Alt pop
- Occupations: Singer; songwriter; Musician; Visual artist
- Instruments: Vocals; guitar; keys
- Years active: 2011–present
- Label: Morgan Joanel (independent)
- Website: morganjoanel.com

Morgan Joanel is an Australian pop singer-songwriter and visual artist based in Perth.

== Musical career ==
=== 2009–2012: Devil's in the Detail ===
Morgan Joanel's career started by signing to Sony Music Australia, who discovered her through Myspace in 2009. On 5 September 2011, she released her debut single under Sony Music, "Devil's In The Detail". In 2010, Joanel was the support act for Adam Lambert on his Australian leg of the Glam Nation Tour. Later that same year, Joanel opened for Jason Derulo on his Australian dates.

=== 2013–2018: Borrowed and Blue ===
Joanel's debut EP, "Borrowed & Blue" was released on 8 March 2013. The EP would be her last release signed to Sony Music Australia. The EP featured four original, previously unreleased songs as well as live recording of a cover of Gorillaz's "19-2000".

Later in 2013, Joanel was the support act for English singer-songwriter, Newton Faulkner.

=== 2019–present: EP ===
In 2019, Joanel released her first official single as an independent artist, "Buy a Little Time", which is also the lead single from her upcoming EP that she announced in 2019.

In April, Joanel was approached by a representative for English singer-songwriter, Anne-Marie, to be an opening act for her Perth show on the Speak Your Mind Australian tour.

Joanel released two singles in 2020, "Disappear", released on 7 February and "Wind Me Up", released on 14 August. On 5 March 2021, Joanel released her fourth single as an independent artist, "Looking To Be Found". On 4 February 2022, via a social media post, Joanel announced the EP would be released as a limited-edition physical copy and include two unreleased songs that wouldn't feature on her streaming platforms.

== Discography ==
=== Extended plays ===
Title	Details	Peak chart positions
Title	Details	AUS
Borrowed & Blue	Released: 2013; Label: Sony Music Australia	—
Night Blooms	Released: TBA	—

=== Singles ===
Title	Year	Peak chart positions	Certifications
Title	Year	AUS	Certifications
"Devil's In The Detail"	2011	—	
"Buy a Little Time"	2019	—	
"Disappear"	2020	—	
"Wind Me Up"	2020	—	
"Looking To Be Found"	2021	—	
"Love is a Dirty Word"	2021	—	

== Concert tours ==
Supporting

- Glam Nation Tour (Adam Lambert, 2010)
- AOL Aim Presents: Jason Derulo (2010)
- Speak Your Mind Tour (Anne-Marie, 2019)
