= The Sky's the Limit (song) =

Single by Jason Derulo

from the album Jason Derülo
- Released: November 15, 2010
- Recorded: 2009
- Genre: Synthpop; disco-pop
- Length: 3:45
- Label: Beluga Heights; Asylum; Warner Bros.
- Songwriters: Jason Desrouleaux; J-Lex; Leff-Row; J.R. Rotem; Alex James
- Producer: J.R. Rotem

Jason Derulo singles chronology
"What If" (2010)	"The Sky's the Limit" (2010)	"Don't Wanna Go Home" (2011)

"The Sky's the Limit" is the fifth and final single released by Jason Derulo from his self-titled debut album. The single was originally planned for release on December 20, 2010 only in the UK, but was pushed forward to November 15, 2010. The track was added to Radio 1's B-Playlist. This is the only single from the album that wasn't released in the United States. The song includes extensive samples from the 1983 hit "Flashdance... What a Feeling" by Irene Cara.

== Music video ==
The music video was filmed in late September 2010. It features Derulo in a glass room, dancing along with a woman (Shay Maria). Derulo is wearing several types of coats, gloves and glasses, while the woman is wearing a black dress. Right at the end, Derulo smiles at the camera while the start of "In My Head" plays.

== Track listing ==
CD

1. "The Sky's the Limit" – 3:45

Digital download

1. "The Sky's the Limit" – 3:45
2. "The Sky's the Limit" (Wideboys Radio Remix) – 3:37
3. "The Sky's the Limit" (Wideboys Club Mix) – 7:00
4. "The Sky's the Limit" (Kim Fai Remix) – 6:28
5. "The Sky's the Limit" (Ayo Remix) – 3:25

== Chart performance ==
The song debuted in the UK Singles Chart at number 107, later peaking at 68.

In Australia, the song debuted at #97 in October 2010, before climbing to #24, then to #22.

== Charts ==
Chart (2010–11)	Peak position
Australia (ARIA)	22
Belgium (Ultratip Bubbling Under Flanders)	2
Belgium (Ultratip Bubbling Under Wallonia)	41
New Zealand (Recorded Music NZ)	31
UK Singles (OCC)	68
UK Hip Hop/R&B (OCC)	16

== Certifications ==
Certifications for "The Sky's the Limit"
Region	Certification	Certified units/sales
Australia (ARIA)	Platinum	70,000^{‡}
^{‡} Sales+streaming figures based on certification alone.
