= Angelique Sabrina =

- Born: Angelique Sabrina White; February 7, 1998 (age 28); Nassau, Bahamas
- Occupations: Actress, singer, dancer, songwriter, performer
- Musical career
- Genres: pop; R&B
- Instrument: vocals
- Years active: 2010 – present
- Labels: White Ocean Entertainment, LLC
- Website: angeliquesabrina.com

Angelique Sabrina (born February 7, 1998) is a Bahamian singer, songwriter, dancer, actress and performer.

== Early life ==
Angelique was born on February 7, 1998, in Nassau, Bahamas, and was brought up in a family with an extensive musical background. Her music producer father, Gregg White, was the first to sign alternative hip-hop group Arrested Development. Angelique grew up as a music student. She began studying piano, guitar, and drums as a child and spent extensive personal time studying Broadway and Disney songs, and artists like Frank Sinatra and Diana Ross.

Her first live performance was at a talent pageant that she entered herself into at the age of 9. She performed an original song that she wrote especially for that occasion and placed first runner-up. Angelique went on to perform at numerous school performances and events. Angelique's first original songs began playing on local radio stations in The Bahamas while she was still 11 years old.

== Music career ==
At the age of 12, with support from her parents, she began intensive studio recording and vocal training. Her YouTube videos attracted the attention of veteran radio executive Gary Bernstein, who formed a partnership with Angelique's father to co-manage her career.

Angelique's first single,"Pull Up", was released in the summer of 2012 and quickly received international radio play. The single's music video premiered with MTV Buzzworthy, who coined Angelique "the next Rihanna". The music video for "Pull Up" caught the attention of television producer and host Ryan Seacrest, and was featured by top teen outlets including J-14, Hollywire, and Crushable, which featured her as the "next big thing".

"Pull Up" reached No. 1 on Jamaica's top entertainment channel, Hype TV. It has also received high-rotation airplay on Sirius-XM "20 on 20" and has been featured on New York City's Z100 "Discover NEW! Music" page. She filmed the remix video for "Pull Up" with over 400 of the top cheerleaders and dancers from the NFL, NBA, MLS and AHL teams.

Angelique's next single "Stop Sign" featuring Barbadian singer Shontelle premiered on MTVU on April 3, 2013. Behind-the-scenes footage of Angelique on set Shontelle and YouTube star Andrea Russett was shot and exclusively premiered online by J-14 Magazine. The single's music video debuted at No. 1 during its first week on HYPE TV, a Jamaican entertainment channel.

In July 2013, Angelique was named as one of the Top 40 Under 40 in the Bahamas.

In February 2014, Angelique released a ballad called "I'm Ready" along with a music video that was shot in her hometown of Nassau, Bahamas.

== Cable Bahamas, Ltd. ==
Angelique recently signed an endorsement deal as the new spokesperson with Cable Bahamas, Ltd., the leading communications provider in the Bahamas. She is the second person to reach an endorsement deal.

The provider is currently revamping their products, and Angelique is a part of this new and revitalized initiative where she will be featured in numerous commercials.

As part of Cable Bahamas, the provider released a short film in July 2013 of Angelique singing the Bahamian national anthem, "March On, Bahamaland." The video was filmed on six major islands and landmarks in the Bahamas, with a huge choir and marching band finale.

The contract expired at the end of December 2014.

== Performances ==
In 2012, she played a sold-out show at New York City's Webster Hall with Ryan Beatty.

In 2012, the Bahamian government asked Angelique to perform for Sir Sidney Poitier during a ceremony in their home country. Angelique wrote a song dedicated to Poitier. "The Measure of a Man" was written and performed live by Angelique for Sir Sidney Poitier and the audience, consisted of celebrities including Oprah Winfrey.

On February 21, 2016, Angelique crooned Sir Sidney Poitier for the second time at an 89th birthday gala hosted by the Bahamas Ministry of Foreign Affairs at the Beverly Wilshire Hotel in Los Angeles.

== Representation ==
In January 2016 Angelique signed with Acting manager Edie Robb of Station Three and with Stewart Talent Los Angeles.

== Personal life ==
Sabrina has a YouTube channel that she operates with her brother, Tristan White. Their YouTube page is called "TristAngie Productions". They usually ask their viewers for challenges and choose one to do when Sabrina isn't in the studio.

Sabrina contributed to the WAT-AAH! 1ACT GIVE BACK benefit in New York City, which benefited families affected by Hurricane Sandy.

== Discography ==
Singles:

- "Pull Up" (May 2012)
- "Stop Sign" Featuring Shontelle – (March 2013)
- "I'm Ready" (February 2014)

Other Tracks:

- "Got A Feeling" (2012)
- "Fire Blaze" (2012)
- "Fairytale" (2012)
- "Right Now" (2014)

Album:

- "One for the People" (2014)

== Awards, features, and nominations ==
Angelique has been featured by top national and international outlets including MTV, Z100, Billboard's The Beat, RyanSeacrest.com, AOL Music, Celebuzz, Profiles 98, M Magazine, J-14, FanLaLa, Hollywire, Kidzbop, and PopCrush. Stylezine Magazine named her their "2012 Entertainer of the Year". She was chosen to sing the Bahamian National Anthem, "March on Bahamaland" at the 2014 IAAF World Championships.
