= Shontelligence =

Studio album by Shontelle
- Released: November 18, 2008
- Length: 40:23
- Labels: SRP; SRC; Universal Motown
- Producers: Classic Soul Productions; Andrew Frampton; The Heavyweights; The Jam; Rodney Jerkins; Kwamé; Troyton Rami; Evan Rogers; Stargate; Supa Dups; Carl Sturken; Wayne Wilkins

Shontelle chronology
Shontelligence (2008)	No Gravity (2010)

Singles from Shontelligence
- 1. "T-Shirt" Released: July 15, 2008; 2. "Stuck with Each Other" Released: February 10, 2009; 3. "Battle Cry" Released: June 9, 2009

Shontelligence is the debut studio album by Barbadian singer Shontelle. It was released by SRP Records, SRC Records and Universal Motown Records on November 18, 2008. Completed in six months, the singer worked with duo Evan Rogers and Carl Sturken on the majority of the album, while a variety of additional producers, including Andrew Frampton, The Heavyweights, The Jam, Rodney Jerkins, Kwamé, Troyton Rami, Stargate, Supa Dups, Wayne Wilkins, and Eliseus Joseph from Classic Soul Productions, also contributed.

The album earned largely mixed reviews from music critics, some of which felt that the rest of the album failed to live up to the quality of its singles. Shontelligence peaked at number 114 on the US Billboard 200 and number 24 on the Top R&B/Hip-Hop Albums chart. It produced three singles, including lead single "T-Shirt," a top ten hit on the UK Singles Chart, and the R&B single "Stuck with Each Other", on February 10, 2009. A third and final single, "Battle Cry," was released on June 9, 2009.

== Background ==
Shontelle began work on her debut studio album in early 2008, and completed the album in six months. The album's title was given to her by the album's engineer who used the word "shontelligence" as a joke after Shontelle and her producers were playing a game that involved making up words from her name.

== Promotion ==
=== Singles ===
- "T-Shirt" was released as the first single from the album on July 15, 2008. It peaked at number thirty-six on the Billboard Hot 100 in the US, giving Shontelle her first Top 40 hit. The song was released in the UK on February 23, 2009. The song was most successful there because it reached number six on the UK chart. It was also A-listed on Radio 1's playlist and received strong rotation on music channels. The song peaked inside the Top 50 in Canada and Ireland as well.
- "Stuck with Each Other" (featuring Akon) was released as the second single from the album on February 10, 2009. The song was a bonus track from the re-release of the album and it was also featured on the film Confessions of a Shopaholic's soundtrack, from which it was released as a promotional single from. It was released only in the form of a digital download in the UK on May 25, 2009 but still managed to reach number twenty-three there. The single also peaked at number fifty in Ireland and number sixty-four on the US Billboard Pop 100 despite receiving no promotion and minimal airplay. The single failed to chart on the US Hot 100, however.
- "Battle Cry" was released as the third and final single from the album on June 9, 2009. It was released as a promo single on October 21, 2008 in support of the Barack Obama compilation album. The song failed to chart in the US. "Battle Cry" was also released in the UK as the third single on August 10, 2009 and reached a peak of number sixty-one there, without promotion.

=== Other songs ===
- "Roll It" was a song written by Sheldon Benjamin and Shontelle for Alison Hinds, and was originally titled "Roll It Gal". It became a huge hit in many Caribbean countries. The song was later re-released in certain areas of Europe under the new title "Roll It" and was performed by J-Status and Rihanna with backing vocals from Shontelle. It was most successful in Finland, reaching number 8 on their chart. Shontelle included the song on her debut album with vocals sang solely by her.
- "Superwoman" was announced as the fourth single in the United States, due for a September 2009 release, but Shontelle officially stated that it would not be released as a single.

== Critical reception ==
Professional ratings
Review scores
Source	Rating
AllMusic	3/5 stars
ARTISTdirect	3/5 stars
The Guardian	3/5 stars

Shontelligence received generally mixed reviews from music critics. AllMusic editor Anthony Tognazzini noted that Shontelligence "finds its legs [...] in the middle ground between urban contemporary pop and the influence of her native island. Tracks like the reggae-driven "Flesh and Bone" represent the latter, while pop singles like "T-Shirt”" and the club-ready "Roll It" prove Shontelle's ability to cross over successfully." He rated the album three ouf of five stars. Amy Sciarretto from ARTISTdirect found that "groove is a key element of Shontelligence, and it's certainly complemented by Shontelle's soulful voice [...] Additionally, Shontelle's songs are as infectious as an STD on prom night, and she'll hook you with any and all of the songs on Shontelligence." David Balls of Digital Spy felt that "Shontelligence certainly has the potential to shift units in an age of disposable R&B. But considering Shontelle's high-achieving past, it's disappointing that the handful of shining moments are dimmed by a barrage of mediocrity. Still, with her strong ambition and clear determination to succeed, you wouldn't bet against her best being yet to come."

Ben Ratliffe of The New York Times gave the album a mixed review. He felt that "Shontelle's individuality is being squelched. The first two tracks, "T-Shirt" and "Battle Cry," both produced by Wayne Wilkins, are the singles, and they stand apart from the rest of the [...] songs, produced by Mr. Sturken and Mr. Rogers, [where] things go sharply downhill. There are enough acoustic guitar and reggae grooves to distinguish Shontelligence from most R&B records, but it hardly matters." Similarly, Andy Gill, writing for The Independent, wrote that Shontelligence "doesn't quite live up to this opening salvo, unfortunately: too many tracks lapse into coffee-table reggae grooves, and too many lyrics rehearse assertiveness-training commonplaces." Alex Macpherson of The Guardian gave the album a mixed three ouf of five stars rating, citing the artist's "thoughtful songwriting and an understated vocal presence. His colleague Paul Lester was more negative, saying the album's lead single was horrible and that he preferred Rihanna to Shontelle, and labeled her a "wannabe hitmaker," citing "the bland lyrics" of "T-Shirt" being comparable to any R&B song. Both reviewers compared Shontelle to Ne-Yo.

== Track listing ==
Shontelligence track listing
No.	Title	Writer(s)	Producer(s)	Length
1.	"T-Shirt"	Andrew Frampton; Wayne Wilkins; Savan Kotecha	Andrew Frampton	3:54
2.	"Battle Cry"	Jamie Jones; Jack Kugell; Wilkins; Jason Pennock; Jordan Omley; Michael Mani	The Heavyweights; The Jam; Wilkins	3:32
3.	"Superwoman"	Amanda Ghost; Tor Erik Hermansen; Mikkel Storleer Eriksen; Ian Dench	Stargate	4:19
4.	"Cold Cold Summer"	Shontelle Layne; Carl Sturken; Evan Rogers	Sturken; Rogers	3:44
5.	"Roll It"	Layne; Sheldon Benjamin	Sturken; Rogers	3:31
6.	"Life Is Not an Easy Road"	Layne; Dwayne Chin Quee; Mitchum Chin	Supa Dups	3:44
7.	"Focus Pon Me"	Layne; Eliseus Joseph	Classic Soul Productions	3:06
8.	"Plastic People"	Layne; Sturken; Rogers	Sturken; Rogers	3:59
9.	"I Crave You"	Layne; Sturken; Rogers	Sturken; Rogers	3:57
10.	"Ghetto Lullabye"	Frederik Odesjo; Layne; Sturken; Rogers	Sturken; Rogers	3:06
11.	"Flesh and Bone"	Layne; Sturken; Rogers	Sturken; Rogers	3:31

Shontelligence – United Kingdom edition (bonus track)
No.	Title	Writer(s)	Producer(s)	Length
12.	"Naughty" (featuring Beenie Man)	Troyton Rami; Xavier Cordover	Rami	3:21

Shontelligence – iTunes Store edition (bonus track)
No.	Title	Writer(s)	Producer(s)	Length
12.	"Blaze It Up" (featuring Collie Buddz)	Layne; Colin Harper; Kwamé Holland	Sturken; Rogers; Kwamé	3:53

Shontelligence – 2009 reissue edition^{[a]} (bonus track)
No.	Title	Writer(s)	Producer(s)	Length
12.	"Stuck with Each Other" (featuring Akon)	Diane Warren	Rodney Jerkins	3:20

Notes:

- ^{^[a]} At a certain point in 2009, a second reissue of the album was pressed and released outside of North America placing "Stuck with Each Other" as track two on the track list prior to "Battle Cry", with all other songs being placed one spot afterwards, with the exception of "I Crave You", which was removed and replaced by "Naughty" as track ten. The new editions of the album were also released to the iTunes Store, where they retained "Blaze It Up" as an exclusive thirteenth track.
- "I Crave You", "Blaze It Up" and the Bimbo Jones vocal remix of "T-Shirt" later came to appear as tracks thirteen, fourteen and fifteen on the Japan edition of Shontelligence, released May 20, 2009.

== Charts ==
Weekly chart performance for Shontelligence
Chart (2008)	Peak position
UK Albums Chart (OCC)	147
US Billboard 200	115
US Top R&B/Hip-Hop Albums (Billboard)	24

== Release history ==
Shontelligence release history
Region	Date	Edition(s)	Format(s)	Label(s)
Various	November 18, 2008	Standard	Digital download; CD	SRC Records; Motown
Various	March 10, 2009	Reissue	Digital download; CD	SRC Records; Motown
