= Whatcha Say =

2009 single by Jason Derulo

Single by Jason Derulo

from the album Jason Derülo
- Released: May 5, 2009 (download); August 4, 2009 (single)
- Recorded: 2009
- Genre: Pop; R&B
- Length: 3:42
- Label: Beluga Heights; Asylum; Warner Bros.
- Songwriters: Jason Desrouleaux; Kisean Anderson; Achraf Baachaoui; J-Lex; Leff Row; Jonathan Rotem; Imogen Heap
- Producers: J. R. Rotem; Fuego

Jason Derulo singles chronology
"Whatcha Say" (2009)	"In My Head" (2009)

Audio sample
- file; help

"Whatcha Say" is the debut single by American singer Jason Derulo for his self-titled debut album (2010). It was released for digital download on May 5, 2009, and officially released as a single on August 4 of the same year. The track reinterprets the bridge from Imogen Heap's 2005 hit "Hide and Seek", prominently featuring its chorus. Produced by J. R. Rotem with extra touches from German producer Fuego, the song enjoyed a week at the top of the Billboard Hot 100, but received mixed reviews from music critics, who were divided on the sample use and lyrical content while others panned the use of Auto-Tune.

Derulo recorded a French-English version with French Guiana singer Fanny J in 2010. A second music video has also been released.

== Background and composition ==
After attending performing arts schools, such as The American Musical and Dramatic Academy, and honing his talents as a singer and dancer, as well as acting in theatre productions like Ragtime and Smokey Joe's Cafe, Derulo won the grand prize on the 2006 season finale of the TV show Showtime at the Apollo. Derulo was discovered by music producer J.R. Rotem, who signed him to his record label Beluga Heights Records and Warner Bros. Records. From 2006 to 2009, Derulo wrote songs for artists such as Diddy, Danity Kane, Donnie Klang, Sean Kingston, Cassie, and Lil Wayne, before gearing up to release his debut single, "Whatcha Say".

In an interview with Digital Spy, Derulo talked about the inspiration for the song. He said, "Basically my brother called me one day and said, 'I cheated on my girl, but I love her so much and I hope she'll give me one more shot'. I found his story really compelling, so I just went into the studio and tried it out. You know, people go through that kind of thing every day, which is why the song is so relatable. She did take my brother back though and they're actually engaged now, so it all worked out good in the end." Regarding the heavy sampling of "Hide and Seek" by Imogen Heap, Derulo called Heap "an incredible talent" and stated that she was "in love with the song [Whatcha Say]". The song was originally intended for Sean Kingston's album Tomorrow, but Kingston and his team rejected it.

== Critical reception ==
"Whatcha Say" received mixed reviews. Glenn Gamboa of Newsday wrote: "For fans of Imogen Heap's "Hide and Seek", the new Jason Derulo single "Whatcha Say" – which liberally samples from the song and even uses Heap's chorus as his own chorus – may be hard to swallow. But Derulo weaves easily in and out of Heap's parts and matches his autotuned vocals to hers pretty well to craft a catchy, if derivative, little number." Upon its November 2009 UK release, noted R&B writer Pete Lewis of 'Blues & Soul' described the single as "Blending pounding beats and Derulo's rich, soulful vocals with an instantly-infectious pop hook sampled from alternative/indie songstress Imogen Heap". Cleveland.com was critical of Derulo's song, criticizing the sampling: "["Hide and Seek,"] loses its raw sentiment in the hands of Derulo and pop producer J.R. Rotem, who turn Heap’s voice into a corny gimmick. How dare they." In a retrospective review, Stereogum wrote: "On some level, "Whatcha Say" wants to be a fully generic song. Most of the production choices are chained to that discrete moment in chart-pop history. Jason Derulo, a perfectly flexible singer with a nice falsetto, doesn't need Auto-Tune to stand out, but he uses a ton of it anyway. The lyrics all come from the viewpoint of a guy who's cheated on his girlfriend and who wants to be forgiven—one of the most clichéd pop-song concepts in existence."

== Commercial performance ==
"Whatcha Say" debuted on the Billboard Hot 100 at number 54 in the issue dated August 29, 2009. It reached number one in the issue dated November 12, 2009. The song also reached the number-one spot on the Canadian Nielsen SoundScan Digital Songs chart. "Whatcha Say" entered and peaked on the UK Singles Chart on November 22, 2009 at number 3.

By June 2014, the single had sold over 4 million digital copies in the US.

== Promotion ==
"Whatcha Say" was performed live by Derulo on Thanksgiving in Philadelphia for the 90th anniversary of the 6abc IKEA Thanksgiving Day Parade. The song was featured in Ben Affleck's film The Town.

The song was also featured on the popular CW show, Gossip Girl, in the episode "Treasure of Serena Madre", which premiered on November 30, 2009.

== Music video ==
The music video was released as the free video of the week on iTunes on October 27, 2009. In the music video, Derulo is seen holding with his love interest on a couch inside a home invaded by sunlights, and later on during the video, he is outside her door, waiting impatiently for her to forgive him, and worrying her to let him in, which goes after the lyrics in his song, "So let me in, give me another chance..." The music video premiered on November 16, 2009 on AMTV. A music video was also released for the acoustic version, which features J. R. Rotem playing the piano.

== Track listing ==
- CD single
1. "Whatcha Say" – 3:42
2. "Whatcha Say" (Acoustic Version) – 3:42
- Digital EP
1. "Whatcha Say" – 3:42
2. "Whatcha Say" (Acoustic Version) – 3:42
3. "Whatcha Say" (Klubjumpers Remix Radio) – 4:03
4. "Whatcha Say" (Johnny Vicious Remix) – 7:32
5. "Whatcha Say" (Wawa Remix Radio) – 3:24
- Maxi CD single
1. "Whatcha Say" – 3:42
2. "Whatcha Say" (Acoustic Version) – 3:42
3. "Whatcha Say" (Klubjumpers Remix Radio) – 4:03
4. "Whatcha Say" (Johnny Vicious Remix) – 7:32
5. "Whatcha Say" (Wawa Remix Radio) – 3:24
6. "Whatcha Say" (video) – 3:46

== Charts ==
=== Weekly charts ===
Chart (2009–2010)	Peak position
Australia (ARIA)	5
Austria (Ö3 Austria Top 40)	9
Belgium (Ultratop 50 Flanders)	22
Belgium (Ultratop 50 Wallonia)	23
Canada Hot 100 (Billboard)	3
Czech Republic Airplay (ČNS IFPI)	13
Denmark (Tracklisten)	7
Europe (European Hot 100 Singles)	12
Finland (Suomen virallinen lista)	11
France (SNEP)	10
France Download (SNEP)	12
Germany (GfK)	7
Hungary (Single Top 40)	7
Ireland (IRMA)	5
Israel International Airplay (Media Forest)	8
Netherlands (Dutch Top 40)	12
Netherlands (Single Top 100)	22
New Zealand (Recorded Music NZ)	1
Norway (VG-lista)	7
Romania Airplay (Media Forest)	5
Slovakia Airplay (ČNS IFPI)	25
Spain (Promusicae)	16
Spanish Airplay Chart	11
Sweden (Sverigetopplistan)	4
Switzerland (Schweizer Hitparade)	5
UK Singles (Official Charts)	3
UK Hip Hop/R&B (Official Charts)	1
US Billboard Hot 100	1
US Adult Pop Airplay (Billboard)	28
US Bubbling Under R&B/Hip-Hop Singles (Billboard)	3
US Dance Club Songs (Billboard)	32
US Pop Airplay (Billboard)	1
US Rhythmic Airplay (Billboard)	1

=== Year-end charts ===
Chart (2009)	Position
Australia (ARIA)	78
Canada (Canadian Hot 100)	63
New Zealand (Recorded Music NZ)	11
UK Singles (OCC)	70
US Billboard Hot 100	34
US Mainstream Top 40 (Billboard)	39
US Rhythmic (Billboard)	30

Chart (2010)	Position
Australia (ARIA)	43
Austria (Ö3 Austria Top 40)	62
Belgium (Ultratop Flanders)	84
Canada (Canadian Hot 100)	44
Europe (European Hot 100 Singles)	33
France (SNEP)	68
Germany (Official German Charts)	72
Netherlands (Dutch Top 40)	61
Japan Digital Tracks (RIAJ)	38
Japan Adult Contemporary (Billboard Japan)	30
Romanian Top 100	50
Sweden (Sverigetopplistan)	90
Switzerland (Schweizer Hitparade)	56
UK Singles (OCC)	158
US Billboard Hot 100	43
US Mainstream Top 40 (Billboard)	29
US Rhythmic (Billboard)	30

== Certifications ==
Region	Certification	Certified units/sales
Australia (ARIA)	4× Platinum	280,000^{^}
Austria (IFPI Austria)	Gold	15,000^{*}
Canada (Music Canada)	4× Platinum	320,000^{‡}
Denmark (IFPI Danmark)	Platinum	90,000^{‡}
France (SNEP)	Platinum	200,000^{‡}
Germany (BVMI)	Gold	150,000^{^}
Italy (FIMI)	Gold	50,000^{‡}
Japan (RIAJ) Digital single	Gold	100,000^{*}
New Zealand (RMNZ)	4× Platinum	120,000^{‡}
Spain (Promusicae)	Gold	30,000^{‡}
United Kingdom (BPI)	2× Platinum	1,200,000^{‡}
United States (RIAA)	5× Platinum	5,000,000
^{*} Sales figures based on certification alone.^{^} Shipments figures based on certification alone.^{‡} Sales+streaming figures based on certification alone.

== Release history ==
Release dates and formats for "Whatcha Say"
Region	Date	Format	Label(s)	Ref.
United States	June 15, 2009	Contemporary hit radio	Warner	

== See also ==
- List of number-one R&B hits of 2009 (UK)
- List of Hot 100 number-one singles of 2009 (U.S.)
- List of Mainstream Top 40 number-one hits of 2009 (U.S.)
- List of Billboard Rhythmic number-one songs of the 2000s
