= No Gravity (Shontelle album) =

Studio album by Shontelle
- Released: September 21, 2010
- Recorded: August 2009–August 2010
- Genres: R&B, dance
- Length: 36:39
- Labels: SRP; SRC; Universal Motown
- Producers: Arnthor Birgisson, Darkchild, The-Dream, Andrew Frampton Tony Kanal, Savan Kotecha, Evan Rogers, The Smeezingtons, Harry Sommerdal, Carl Sturken

Shontelle chronology
| Shontelligence (2008) | No Gravity (2010) |

Singles from No Gravity
- 1. "Impossible" Released: February 9, 2010; 2. "Perfect Nightmare" Released: August 31, 2010; 3. "Say Hello to Goodbye" Released: March 15, 2011

No Gravity is the second studio album by Barbadian singer Shontelle, released on September 21, 2010 by SRP Records, SRC Records and Universal Motown Records in the United States. The album was later released on October 18, 2010 in the United Kingdom. Initially scheduled for an August 2010 release the album had been in production since August 2009 and was pushed back by one month to include additional recording sessions with Rodney Jerkins.

It has been preceded by the lead single "Impossible", which was released on February 9, 2010, and reached number 13 on the US Billboard Hot 100. A second single, "Perfect Nightmare", was sent to American radio on August 31, 2010. The album debuted at number eighty-one before falling off the chart the following week.

In May 2011, according to a post on Shontelle's official Facebook page, the album was due for re-release in 2011. However it was revealed in August 2011, that Shontelle was working on her third studio album.

== Background ==
Shontelle stated that the album would be experimental and rock-influenced and described the overall sound as "well-balanced". The album was delayed from its original August 24 release date to September 14 (later September 21) in order for Shontelle to collaborate with Darkchild. The late sessions with producer Rodney Jerkins, made one of Shontelle's dreams come true. She said he is someone who she "always wanted to work with", and that the studio sessions ultimately generated what is about to become the album's second single, "Perfect Nightmare". Beatweek described the song as something which "threatens to be a ballad for its first minute, but ultimately explodes into a dance-friendly number." The song "DJ Made Me Do It" was originally intended for twin sisters, Nina Sky, who recorded the song for their second album. But when their project was delayed the song's writers, The Jackie Boyz, Bruno Mars and Philip Lawrence, offered it to Shontelle because technically the song didn't belong to Nina Sky.

Speaking about the title in August 2010 to UK urban writer Pete Lewis of Blues & Soul, Shontelle explained: "'No Gravity' became almost like this mantra that I adopted to my life and to the whole project... I basically thought 'I really can't let anything stand in my way; I can't let anything stop me from rising to the top; I can't have anything holding me down or holding me back. There has to be no gravity, so I can float higher and higher!"

== Promotion ==
Shontelle has begun promoting the album with live performances and promotion on her website, ShontelleMusic. A viral three-part series, Uncovered, began on June 22, 2010, and follows Shontelle in promotion for No Gravity. Via her Facebook account, Shontelle released five songs from No Gravity. She will also be Kevin Rudolf's opening act on his upcoming To The Sky Tour. She was featured on Beatweek's eighty-first issue. She is also scheduled to perform with former American Idol runner-up, David Archuleta at WLAN FM's 'Birthday Barndance' on September 24, 2010, at the Pullo Centre.

== Singles ==
"Impossible" was released as the lead single from the album on February 9, 2010, for digital download, but failed to garner success until May 2010. The single has reached number thirteen on the Billboard Hot 100, becoming Shontelle's most successful single to date. It was to be released in the United Kingdom, by digital download, on September 13, 2010. A music video was filmed for the single and released in March 2010.

"Perfect Nightmare" was sent to US radio on August 31, 2010, as the album's second single. Sara Anderson of AOL Radio Blog mentioned the song, saying, "Opening with a haunting piano melody, by 1:08 'Perfect Nightmare' turns into to [sic] poppy, club-driven anthem, as Shontelle struggles to break free from a damaging relationship." Robbie Dow of Idolator said, "And while she can't seem to shake the pesky gent she describes in the tune, we're finding Shon's latest to be equally irresistible. It's certainly a step in the right direction for the 24-year-old, for whom Top 10 hit status in the US has so far been elusive." The official music video premiered on October 1, 2010.

"Say Hello to Goodbye" is the third single of the album. It was sent to US mainstream radio on March 15, 2011. The music video premiered on VEVO on May 27, 2011.

=== Other songs ===
"Licky (Under the Covers)", which features DJ Frank E, was originally to be the lead international single and the second US single. It was later revealed that the track was not to be included on the album, though it is included as a bonus track on the UK digital editions of the album. A video was made for the track in January 2010.

== Critical reception ==
Professional ratings
Review scores
| Source | Rating |
|---|---|
| AllMusic | 2/5 stars |
| The Boston Globe | (mixed) |
| The Canadian Press | (negative) |
| Entertainment Weekly | (B−) |
| The Guardian | 3/5 stars |
| The New York Times | (mixed) |

The album received an aggregated review score of 55 out of 100 which signifies mixed reviews. Although some critics praised the album's slow ballads, there was general criticisms for the lack of originality or distinguishable sound. Carmen Castro of The Canadian Press was disappointed with the album's lack of an original sound. "Give her credit for her powerful vocals on 'Impossible', though the songs she sings add nothing to the well-worn subject of heartbreak. The lyrics are filled with the same misguided, lonely thoughts of a distraught woman... On 'No Gravity,' the 23-year-old proves she has yet to find her own signature style. It sounds too similar to Rihanna's up-tempo dance material... Shontelle has talent; she just needs time to find her own identity before she can soar. Shontelle hits the right notes on "Impossible", the CD's only standout track." Andy Kellman of AllMusic also gave the album a negative review saying that "her functional dance-pop material and temperate ballads could be delivered by any moderately talented vocalist from the Midwest." Additionally Kellman said that although 'Impossible' nearly became a top-ten hit, "it leaves no impression beyond the fact that it is a cathartic ballad of some sort." He described the up-tempo tracks as "get[ting] the job done for the dancefloor but lacking in character". When speaking of the album's other big ballad, 'Kiss You Up', he said "drifts with a gait so sluggish that any love interest would likely nod off by the second verse."

Ken Capobianco from The Boston Globe said "Shontelle's 2008 Shontelligence was one of the most overlooked pop gems of recent years. This follow-up for the Bajan singer-songwriter drops all Caribbean influences and leans toward club tracks mixed with canny pop and emotional, hook-laden ballads." He criticised the songwriting for "recycling lyrics" but said that on some tracks Shontelle's vocals "gave the songs life" as well as stating that the "club tracks are the standouts". He ended by saying, "facile comparisons to fellow Barbadian Rihanna have shadowed Shontelle, but this should move her into the spotlight." John Caraminica of The New York Times gave No Gravity a mixed to positive review. He said "Shontelle's 'Impossible' is a lovely thing... The rest of No Gravity is a competent, sometimes exciting pop album, collects other attempts: in essence, a series of portraits drawn by people with radically different styles. Emotionally blank and appealing in an undistinguished way, Shontelle fits them all. But some shadows are worth dancing around." He compared the album to fellow Barbadian singer Rihanna, describing how the context of No Gravity makes it "difficult to not think of Rihanna" because the album sounds like "the direct musical reckoning Rihanna never made after her 2009 fight with Chris Brown." Charlotte Andrews from The Guardian agreed awarding the album three out of five stars. She criticised the album's production calling it "white-washed R&B, upbeat dance tempos and glossy production" and pointed out that there was nothing original about the project, it could have been done "by any number of pop princesses" She concluded by saying "There are high-power vocals and infectious hooks throughout, but the subject matter – heartbreak, innocuous romance, tales of survival – feels vapid. No Gravity is seamlessly crafted but ultimately disposable, and lacks the kick needed to distinguish Shontelle from the sugary, auto-tuned R&B ranks". Tanner Stransky from Entertainment Weekly said the album had stand out moments such as "Say Hello to Goodbye" and "Kiss You" which show that she has "a knack for slower and (somewhat) thoughtful songs". The rest of the disk was criticised for being "rather unremarkable tour through uptempo styles, including techno, bubblegum, and club."

== Track listing ==
No Gravity – Standard edition
| No. | Title | Writer(s) | Producer(s) | Length |
|---|---|---|---|---|
| 1. | "Perfect Nightmare" | Rodney Jerkins; Victoria McCants; Letoya Duggan | Darkchild | 3:49 |
| 2. | "Impossible" | Arnthor Birgisson; Ina Wroldsen | Birgisson | 3:46 |
| 3. | "No Gravity" | Shontelle Layne; Harry Sommerdahl; Hanne Sorvaag | Sommerdal | 3:34 |
| 4. | "Take Ova" (featuring Pitbull) | Tommy Brown; Michaela Shiloh; McCants; Armando Perez | Darkchild, Tommy Brown | 4:06 |
| 5. | "Say Hello to Goodbye" | Layne; Martin; Hansen; Sorvaag | Hansen | 3:52 |
| 6. | "DJ Made Me Do It" (featuring Asher Roth) | Bruno Mars; Philip Lawrence; Ari Levine; Steven Battey; Carlos Battey | The Smeezingtons | 3:23 |
| 7. | "Love Shop" | Timothy Thomas; Theron Thomas; Djibril Kagni; Jordan Houyez; Fotemah Mba; Jason Kpana | Djibril Kagni; Jordan Houyez | 3:22 |
| 8. | "Helpless" | Carl Sturken; Evan Rogers; Layne | Sturken; Rogers | 3:37 |
| 9. | "Kiss You Up" | Jimmy Harry; Tony Kanal; Maureen "MoZella" McDonald | Harry; Kanal | 3:17 |
| 10. | "T-Shirt" (Radio Killa Remix) (featuring The-Dream) | Andrew Frampton; Wayne Wilkins; Savan Kotecha | Frampton; Kotecha; The-Dream* | 3:53 |
| Total length: | | | | 36:39 |

No Gravity – iTunes Store bonus track
| No. | Title | Writer(s) | Producer(s) | Length |
|---|---|---|---|---|
| 11. | "Evacuate My Heart" | Jerkins; Shiloh; McCants; Duggan | Darkchild | 3:22 |

No Gravity – United Kingdom digital edition and 2022 worldwide digital reissue
| No. | Title | Writer(s) | Producer(s) | Length |
|---|---|---|---|---|
| 12. | "Licky (Under the Covers)" | Sean Garrett | DJ Frank E; Oligee; Thom D. Lawrence | 3:06 |

Notes

- * signifies a remixer

== Personnel ==
Source: Adapted from Barnes & Noble.

Management and legal

- Robert Jah Carnes – management
- Terence English – A&R
- Phylicia Fant – publicity
- Scott Felcher – legal counsel
- Evan Freifeld – legal counsel
- Rob Heselden – A&R
- Jason "Chyld" Kpana – A&R
- Christie Moran – management
- Matt Maroone – marketing
- Damien Gooding – marketing
- Evan Rogers – executive producer

Creative team

- Robert Ascroft – photographer
- Sandy Brummels – art direction
- Lorna Leighton – art direction
- Yuseff – hair stylist
- Basia Zamorska – stylist

Vocals

- Evan Rogers – background vocals
- Shontelle Layne – primary artist, lead vocals, background vocals
- Hanne Sørvaag – background vocals
- Ina Wroldsen – background vocals

Musicians

- Olav Gustafsson – guitar
- Martin Hansen – guitar
- Jimmy Harry – guitar, keyboards
- Rodney "Darkchild" Jerkins – keyboards
- Tony Kanal – bass
- Ari Levine – drums, keyboards
- Eric "Jesus" Loomes – bass
- Bruno Mars – guitar, drums, keyboards
- Esbjörn Öhrwall – guitar
- Harry Sommerdahl – keyboards

Technical

- Arnthor Birgisson – programming
- Ari Blitz – mastering
- Tommy Brown – producer, instrumentation
- Brandon Cadell – assistant engineer
- LaShawn Daniels – vocal producer
- Mike "Handz" Donaldson – engineer
- John Hanes – Pro-Tools
- Martin Hansen – programming, producer, engineer
- Kuk Harrell – engineer
- Jimmy Harry – programming, producer, engineer, composer
- Al Hemberger – engineer
- Jordan Houyez – programming, producer
- Seth Foster – mastering
- Chris Fudurich – engineer
- Rodney Jerkins – instrumentation
- Djibril Kagni – programming, producer
- Tony Kanal – producer
- Chris Kasych – engineer
- Ari Levine – programming, engineer
- Thomas Lumpkins – vocal producer
- Phillip "Princeton" Lynah Jr. – engineer
- Terius "The-Dream" Nash – remixing
- Bruno Mars – programming
- Larry Ryckman – mastering
- The Smeezingtons – producers
- Harry Sommerdahl – programming, producer, engineer
- Carl Sturken – programming, executive producer, instrumentation, producer
- Brian "B-Luv" Thomas – engineer
- Pat Thrall – engineer
- Shelly Yakus – mastering

== Charts ==
| Chart (2010) | Peak position |
|---|---|
| UK R&B Albums (Official Charts) | 23 |
| US Billboard 200 | 81 |
