= Ridin' Solo =

2010 single by Jason Derulo

Single by Jason Derulo

from the album Jason Derulo
- Released: February 24, 2010
- Genre: Electropop; R&B
- Length: 3:36
- Label: Warner Bros. (US); WEA International Inc. (outside US)
- Songwriters: Jason Derulo; J. R. Rotem; Xavier Thomas
- Producer: J. R. Rotem

Jason Derulo singles chronology
| "In My Head" (2009) | "Ridin' Solo" (2010) | "What If" (2010) |

Audio sample
- "Ridin' Solo": file; help

Music video
- "Ridin' Solo" on YouTube

"Ridin' Solo" is a song by American singer Jason Derulo, released as the third single from his self-titled debut album and produced by J. R. Rotem. The demo originally sampled "Bitter Sweet Symphony" by the Verve, but the sample was not cleared and was subsequently replaced with electronic motifs, which are featured throughout the entire song.

On May 16, 2010, "Ridin' Solo" became Derulo's third consecutive top three hit on the UK Singles Chart. It is his third consecutive number-one hit on the UK R&B Chart and third consecutive top ten hit on the US Billboard Hot 100.

== Critical reception ==
The song has received generally mixed reviews from critics, with many divided on its sample use and lyrics, while others panned its over-reliance on Auto-Tune, though some did praise the song's production. Fraser McAlpine of BBC Chart Blog gave the song a rating of three stars out of five and went to say that "Jason clearly doesn't have a lisp, his sibilants hiss out from every other word in the song. And he delivers them all perfectly. Nice work otherwise.

Idolator said that "Derulo knows how to get the public interested in the hip-hop star again—follow every trend there is". Robert Copsey from Digital Spy gave "Ridin' Solo" three out of five stars and wrote that it "is still another catchy, engaging effort that should keep Derulo near the top on both sides of the pond".

== Chart performance ==
As of April 23, 2014, the single has sold over 3 million digital copies in the US, making it Derulo's third consecutive song to sell more than 3 million copies.

== Music video ==
The music video for "Ridin' Solo" was released on May 2, 2010, directed by Scott Speer. The video depicts Derulo singing about being single after breaking up with his girlfriend. In the first 15 seconds of the video, Derulo is playing a piano and singing "Blind", which is a track of his debut album, with a photo of his ex-girlfriend on the top of the piano. Derulo features in several scenes shot at Lot 613, including one in a nightclub, several in a Honda CR-Z and his dancing, (at times with backup dancers) on a moving floor (which are actually hidden conveyor belts) in front of a big, colorful LED screen flashing and glowing, sometimes reading "Solo" in block letters. Derulo wears a white jacket with spikes on the sleeves throughout the video in different scenes.

In one of the nightclub scenes filmed at Lot 613, a group of girls are seen to be chatting on PlentyofFish (an Internet dating website) on an iPad which was first released. There is a slight difference between the music video and the album version of the song; in the video the line "You told me get my shit together, now I got my shit together, oh" uncensored on the track is replaced by "You told me get myself together, now I got myself together, oh". Some areas of the instrumental have also been altered slightly and it is a few seconds shorter than the album version. This version is also used on many radio stations across the UK. Another radio edit exists which is similar to the video version, except it mutes the explicit lyrics rather than just replace them with other words.

== Covers ==
In April 2012, "Ridin' Solo" was covered by MC Chris and included on his 2012 mixtape Apple Lung with the lyrics changed to "I'm Han Solo", a song created for the 2012 video game Kinect Star Wars, which inspired Aaron Fraser-Nash's own parody in 2018. The Station parodied "Ridin' Solo" on YouTube as "No Homo".

== Track listing ==
- CD maxi single
1. "Ridin' Solo"
2. "Ridin' Solo" (Acoustic Version)
3. "Ridin' Solo" (Justin Michael & Kemal Remix)
4. "Ridin' Solo" (Eddie Amador Club)
5. "Ridin' Solo" (Mig & Rizzo POP Mix)
6. "Ridin' Solo" (Video)
- Ridin' Solo EP
1. "Ridin' Solo" (Acoustic Version) – 3:44
2. "Ridin' Solo" (Eddie Amador Club) – 7:59
3. "Ridin' Solo" (Justin Michael & Kemal Remix) – 6:17
4. "Ridin' Solo" (Ian Nieman Club Mix) – 6:58
- 7th Heaven Remix
1. "Ridin' Solo" (7th Heaven Club Mix) – 6:42
2. "Ridin' Solo" (7th Heaven Radio Edit) – 3:21
- Promo CD single
1. "Ridin' Solo" – 3:24

== Charts ==
=== Weekly charts ===
| Chart (2010) | Peak position |
|---|---|
| Australia (ARIA) | 4 |
| Austria (Ö3 Austria Top 40) | 36 |
| Belgium (Ultratop 50 Flanders) | 31 |
| Belgium (Ultratip Bubbling Under Wallonia) | 4 |
| Canada Hot 100 (Billboard) | 19 |
| Czech Republic Airplay (ČNS IFPI) | 41 |
| Europe (European Hot 100 Singles) | 11 |
| Germany (GfK) | 24 |
| German Black Chart | 15 |
| Hungary (Rádiós Top 40) | 11 |
| Ireland (IRMA) | 4 |
| Italy (FIMI) | 35 |
| Netherlands (Dutch Top 40) | 15 |
| Netherlands (Single Top 100) | 47 |
| New Zealand (Recorded Music NZ) | 12 |
| Slovakia Airplay (ČNS IFPI) | 51 |
| South Korea International Singles (Gaon) | 194 |
| Switzerland (Schweizer Hitparade) | 45 |
| UK Singles (Official Charts) | 2 |
| UK Hip Hop/R&B (Official Charts) | 1 |
| US Billboard Hot 100 | 9 |
| US Dance Club Songs (Billboard) | 29 |
| US Pop Airplay (Billboard) | 7 |
| US Rhythmic Airplay (Billboard) | 4 |

=== Year-end charts ===
| Chart (2010) | Position |
|---|---|
| Australia (ARIA) | 38 |
| Canada (Canadian Hot 100) | 57 |
| European Hot 100 Singles | 76 |
| Hungary (Rádiós Top 40) | 79 |
| Netherlands (Dutch Top 40) | 95 |
| UK Singles (Official Charts Company) | 22 |
| US Billboard Hot 100 | 34 |
| US Mainstream Top 40 (Billboard) | 30 |
| US Rhythmic (Billboard) | 35 |

== Certifications ==
| Region | Certification | Certified units/sales |
|---|---|---|
| Australia (ARIA) | 5× Platinum | 350,000^{‡} |
| Canada (Music Canada) | Platinum | 80,000^{*} |
| Denmark (IFPI Danmark) | Gold | 45,000^{‡} |
| New Zealand (RMNZ) | 2× Platinum | 60,000^{‡} |
| United Kingdom (BPI) | 2× Platinum | 1,200,000^{‡} |
| United States (RIAA) | 4× Platinum | 4,000,000^{‡} |
^{*} Sales figures based on certification alone.^{‡} Sales+streaming figures based on certification alone.

== Release history ==
| Region | Date | Format | Label |
|---|---|---|---|
| United States | February 24, 2010 | Digital download | Warner Bros. Records |
| Belgium | April 26, 2010 | Digital download | WEA International Inc. |
| United States | May 25, 2010 | Contemporary hit radio | Warner Bros. Records |
| United Kingdom | May 31, 2010 | CD single | Warner Bros. Records |
| Germany | June 21, 2010 | Digital download | Warner Bros. Records |
| Germany | September 3, 2010 | CD single | Warner Bros. Records |
