= Perfect Nightmare (song) =

Single by Shontelle

from the album No Gravity
- Released: August 31, 2010
- Recorded: 2010
- Genre: R&B, dance
- Length: 3:49
- Label: SRC, Motown
- Songwriters: Rodney Jerkins, LeToya Duggan, Victoria McCants
- Producer: Darkchild

Shontelle singles chronology
| "Impossible" (2010) | "Perfect Nightmare" (2010) | "Say Hello to Goodbye" (2011) |

"Perfect Nightmare" is the second single taken from Barbadian singer Shontelle's second album No Gravity (2010). It was sent to radio in the United States on August 31, 2010, followed by a digital release along with the album on September 21, 2010 and was to be released digitally in the United Kingdom on February 27, 2011, however its release was canceled.

== Background ==
"Perfect Nightmare" was sent to UK urban radio in January 2011, where it was listed on the B-playlist.

== Critical reception ==
So far, "Perfect Nightmare" has received positive reviews. Sara Anderson of AOL Radio Blog spoke highly of the song, stating, "Opening with a haunting piano melody, by 1:08 'Perfect Nightmare' turns into to [sic] poppy, club-driven anthem, as Shontelle struggles to break free from a damaging relationship." Robbie Daw of Idolator said, "And while she can't seem to shake the pesky gent she describes in the tune, we're finding Shon's latest to be equally irresistible. It's certainly a step in the right direction for the 24-year-old, for whom Top 10 hit status in the U.S. has so far been elusive."

== Music video ==
The song's music video was directed by Colin Tilley and was released on September 30, 2010. It opens with Shontelle walking alone next to an old building before cutting to a black and white scene of her singing in darkness. A man is shown working out in a gym and footage is shown of Shontelle interacting with him after he is finished. In the next scene, Shontelle can be seen standing in front of bright yellow lights and four other women, who begin to dance as the song's beat picks up. Between takes of Shontelle singing in front of these women, the man can again be seen working out but this time with a different woman. Next, Shontelle is shown entering the gym and crouching in front of a row of lockers, flailing around as she sings. In the final scene, a fight is taking place between the man and another boxer as the other woman watches. Shontelle is shown standing in front of a wall that separates the boxing ring from the locker room, and finally steps around the wall entering into plain sight of the man. He looks over at her, concerned, and as he does his opponent punches him in the head, knocking him down.
