= Stuck with Each Other =

2009 single by Shontelle

Single by Shontelle featuring Akon

from the album Shontelligence and Confessions of a Shopaholic soundtrack
- Released: February 10, 2009
- Recorded: 2008
- Genre: R&B
- Length: 3:15 (album version); 3:02 (radio edit)
- Label: SRC; Motown
- Songwriter: Diane Warren
- Producer: Darkchild

Shontelle singles chronology
"T-Shirt" (2008)	"Stuck with Each Other" (2009)	"Battle Cry" (2009)

Akon singles chronology
"Day Dreaming" (2009)	"Stuck with Each Other" (2009)	"Silver & Gold" (2009)

"Stuck with Each Other" is the second solo single released by Barbadian singer Shontelle. It was released to radio in the United States on February 10, 2009, and May 21, 2009 as a single in the United Kingdom. It features R&B singer Akon and is the first single from the re-release of her debut album, Shontelligence. It is also featured on the Confessions of a Shopaholic soundtrack. The song was the second single from Shontelligence in the UK, being added to BBC Radio 1's C-list playlist on April 22, 2009, and has since reached the B-List. "Stuck with Each Other" also reached the A-List of BBC Radio 2's playlist. It became her second top 30 hit in the UK Singles Chart.

== Reception ==
David Balls of Digital Spy gave the song 3/5 stars:

After visiting the top ten with 'T-Shirt' earlier this year, it looked as though Shontelle really could follow in the footsteps of her countrywoman Rihanna. However, her debut album Shontelligence has thus far failed to crack the top 100 on either side of the Atlantic, so her record company have sprung into panic mode. Deciding the best option would be to draft in an urban heavyweight to raise her profile, Akon's services have been utilised and fingers are being kept firmly crossed. The result is 'Stuck With Each Other', a Diane Warren-penned midtempo R&B tune that could just as easily have been recorded by the Rowlands, Sparks and Hudsons of this world. But having stretched the definition of "generic" and "mind-numbing" on recent releases, Akon comes across surprisingly well here, with the pair delivering a strong and mutually complementary vocal performance. There are more inspiring tracks on Shontelle's album - 'Roll It' being a prime example - so let's hope it's one big porkie when she tells Akon: "There's nothing I'd rather do than stick with you forever."

== Music video ==
The music video was directed by Gil Green and was released to Shontelle's official fansite on March 4, 2009.

It features both Shontelle and Akon. The video starts off with Shontelle and her boyfriend shopping with Shontelle trying on many outfits and coming out of fitting rooms whilst clips of the movie are shown. During Akon's verse it has them against a gold background which appears to be a picture on the wall. Other pictures on the walls are clips of the film, Confessions of a Shopaholic. Then Shontelle and her boyfriend end up putting clothes in a bag.

== Track listing ==
UK digital single

1. "Stuck with Each Other" (Main)
2. "Stuck with Each Other" (Riff & Rays Remix - Club Edit)
3. "Stuck with Each Other" (Dubwise Tribal Life Mix)
4. "Stuck with Each Other" (Self Taught Beats Mix)

== Charts ==
Chart (2009)	Peak position
Ireland (IRMA)	46
UK Singles (Official Charts)	23
UK Hip Hop/R&B (Official Charts)	10
US Pop Airplay (Billboard)	48
