= Alison Hinds =

Barbadian singer (born 1970)

Doctor Alison Hinds Doctor of Letters
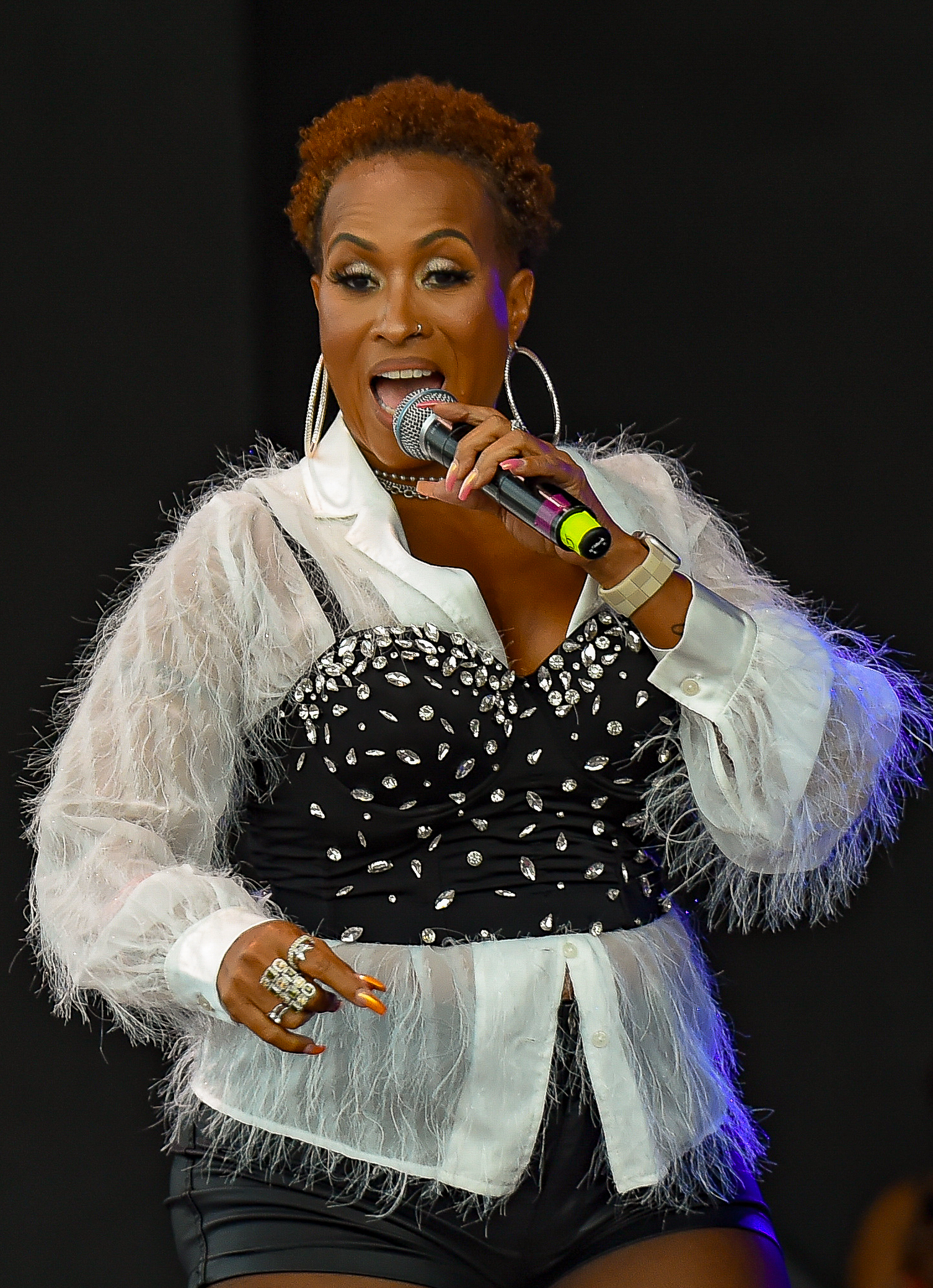
- Hinds in 2025

Background information
- Also known as: Queen Of Soca
- Born: Alison Amanda Hinds; June 1st 1970 (age 56); Plaistow, London, England
- Origin: Bridgetown, Barbados
- Genre: Soca
- Occupation: Singer
- Instrument: Vocals
- Years active: 1987–present
- Labels: Black Coral Records, 1720 Entertainment
- Formerly of: Square One
- Spouse: Edward Walcott Junior (married 2004)
- Website: .alisonhinds.com

Alison Amanda Hinds (born June 1st 1970) is a British-born Barbadian soca singer based in Barbados. She is often referred to as the Bajan Soca as a result of her impact on the genre.

== Biography ==
Alison Hinds was born on June 1st 1970 in London, England, and was raised in Plaistow. Both her parents were from the island of Barbados; her father was employed at the Ford's Dagenham plant. When she was 11 years old, her parents divorced and she moved to Barbados with her mother. Hinds competed in the Richard Stoute Teen Talent contest in 1985, finishing in third place. She was a lead vocalist in the popular band Square One, joining the group in 1987, and recording several albums before leaving the band in 2004 to take care of her newborn daughter. Hinds won the Barbados Song Contest in 1992 with the duet with John King "Hold You in a Song", the Road March in 1996 and 1997, and the Party Monarch competition in Barbados in 1997.

Hinds lives in Barbados with her husband Edward Walcott Junior and her daughter, on a privately owned horse farm, which her husband manages. She has her own band, the Alison Hinds Show, formed in 2005, with Hinds as the main singer and most of the other members of the band young dancers and musicians. After returning to music with a vocal contribution to a remix of Kevin Lyttle's "Turn Me On", she returned to the soca scene with the hit song "Roll It Gal", which praises women's independence in lyrics about Women's empowerment. The song was a huge hit throughout the Caribbean and was released in the UK in 2007 to coincide with the release of her debut album. "Roll It" has been a popular staple in the Caribbean culture. She also recorded a collaboration with Machel Montano for the remix of "Roll It Gal".

Hinds' debut solo album Soca Queen was released in October 2007. Her 2010 album Caribbean Queen contains collaborations with Shaggy, Richie Spice, and Jah Cure, with whom she collaborated on the single "Team Up" in 2009. In 2011, she performed a soca collaboration called "Glow" with Trinidadian calypsonian David Rudder.

She has toured worldwide and has performed at many of the West Indian Carnivals and festivals including Reagge Sumfest, and the West Indian American Carnival in Brooklyn. On 11 November 2011, Hinds was one of many Barbadian entertainers shown on the Where in the World is Matt Lauer? segment on NBC.

In January 2018, Hinds was appointed a cultural ambassador of Barbados. She was later bestowed with an award for artistic excellence at the 2018 Barbados Independent Film Festival. On Saturday, 21 October 2023, she was awarded the Honorary Degree of the Doctor of Letters by the University of the West Indies at Cave Hill.

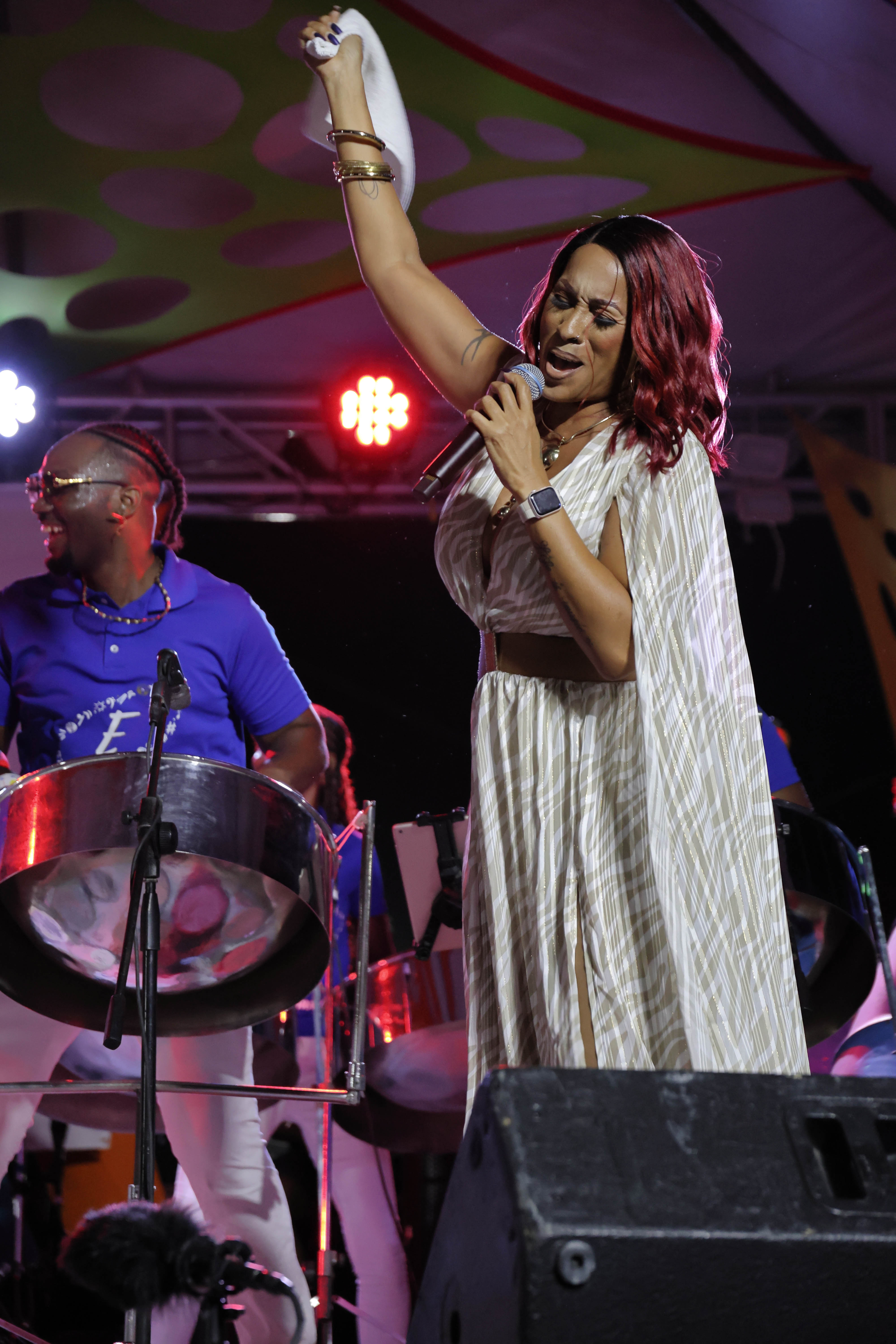
Alison Hinds performing at Crop Over in Barbados

== Discography ==
=== Albums ===
Year	Album	Peak positions									
Year	Album	U.S.	CAN	AUS	UK	FRA	GER	IRE	NZ	ITA	JAP
2007	Soca Queen: 1st studio album; Released: 22 October 2007	—	—	—	—	—	—	—	—	—	—
2010	Caribbean Queen: 2nd studio album; Released: 25 June 2010	—	—	—	—	—	—	—	—	—	—

=== Singles ===
Year	Title	Chart positions								Album
Year	Title	UK	US R&B	NZ	IRE	SWE	NET	FIN	SWI	Album
2005	"Roll It Gal"	135	52	—	—	—	—	—	—	Soca Queen
2005	"Thundah"	—	—	—	—	—	—	—	—	Soca Queen
2005	"The More You Get"	—	—	—	—	—	—	—	—	Soca Queen
2010	"King and Queen" (with Richie Spice)	—	—	—	—	—	—	—	—	Caribbean Queen
2010	"Can't Let My Luv Go" (with Shaggy)	—	—	—	—	—	—	—	—	Caribbean Queen

=== Guest appearances ===
- "Something About You" - Walker Hornung ft. Alison Hinds 1999
- "Bring It Superstar Mix" – Lalchan Babwa (Hunter) ft. Alison Hinds, Andy Singh, Bunji Garlin & Ziggy Rankin
- "Ah Bottle of Rum" – Lalchan Babwa (Hunter) ft. Alison Hinds, Peter Ram
- "Roll Up De Tassa Remake" – Drupatee Ramgoonai ft. Alison Hinds

== See also ==
- List of Barbadians
