= Jason Derulo (album) =

Studio album by Jason Derulo
- Released: February 26, 2010
- Recorded: 2009
- Genres: Electropop; R&B
- Length: 31:39
- Labels: Beluga Heights; Warner Bros.
- Producers: J. R. Rotem; Fuego

Jason Derulo chronology
Jason Derulo (2010)	Future History (2011)

Singles from Jason Derulo
- 1. "Whatcha Say" Released: August 4, 2009; 2. "In My Head" Released: December 8, 2009; 3. "Ridin' Solo" Released: April 26, 2010; 4. "What If" Released: August 9, 2010; 5. "The Sky's the Limit" Released: November 15, 2010

Jason Derulo (stylized as Jason Derülo) is the debut studio album by American singer Jason Derulo, released on February 26, 2010. The album was produced entirely by J. R. Rotem and was supported by five singles: “Whatcha Say,” “In My Head,” “Ridin' Solo,” “What If,” and “The Sky's the Limit.” “Whatcha Say” topped the Billboard Hot 100, becoming Derulo’s first U.S. number-one single, while “In My Head” peaked at number five on the Hot 100 and reached number one in the UK and Australia. “Ridin’ Solo” sold over three million digital copies in the United States and became a top-10 hit in several countries. “What If” charted moderately on the Billboard Hot 100, and “The Sky’s the Limit,” released as a single in select territories, reached the top 70 on the UK Singles Chart.

The album blends electropop and R&B, with prominent use of Auto-Tune and synth-driven production. Critical reception was mixed: some praised Derulo's vocal ability and the catchiness of certain songs, while others criticized it as gimmicky and lacking a distinct artistic identity. Jason Derulo debuted at number 11 on the US Billboard 200, and charted within the top ten of the UK Albums Chart and Irish Albums Chart. Jason Derülo is certified Platinum by the Recording Industry Association of America (RIAA).

== Background ==
Derulo wrote songs for many successful artists from 2006 to 2009, and his debut single "Whatcha Say" was released on August 4, 2009. Produced by J.R. Rotem with additional production by Fuego, it samples the Imogen Heap song "Hide and Seek". In late August 2009, the song debuted at number 54 on the US Billboard Hot 100 before peaking at number 1 in November 2009. Derulo began work on his first album.

By December 2009, the album was completed, and he released its second single, "In My Head", on December 8, 2009. The song debuted at number 63 on the US Billboard Hot 100, and peaked at number 5. Jason began promoting the album in late November 2009 by appearing as one of the opening acts for Lady Gaga's The Monster Ball Tour, which ended in 2011.

== Singles ==
"Whatcha Say" was released as the lead single from the album on August 4, 2009. The single became available for digital download on May 5, 2009. The song samples Imogen Heap's song "Hide and Seek", and reached number 54 on the US Billboard Hot 100 in late August 2009. It peaked at number 1 on the Hot 100 in mid-November 2009, which made Derulo a star internationally, as the single reached number 1 in many other countries. The music video was filmed in August 2009 and was released in September 2009, and it received heavy rotation on VH1 and MTV. "In My Head" was released as the second single from the album on December 8, 2009, entering the Hot 100 at number 63 in late December 2009, then peaking at number 5. Derulo recorded a remix of the song with Nicki Minaj, which hit number 1 on the Australian Singles Chart on February 22, 2010, and number 1 on the UK Singles Chart.

"Ridin' Solo" was released as the third single from the album. The song officially hit US airwaves on May 11, 2010. It was released on May 31, 2010, in the UK. "Ridin' Solo" peaked at number 2 on the UK Singles Chart and has become his third UK R&B Chart number 1 single. "What If" was released as the fourth single in the UK on July 26 and as the fourth single in the US. The video premiered online on July 10. On July 18, 2010, the song debuted on the UK Singles Chart at number 40 and peaked at number 12. "The Sky's the Limit" was released to Australian radio in early October, and the track debuted at number 97 on the Australian ARIA Singles Chart on October 25, 2010. It peaked at number 22

== Critical reception ==
Professional ratings
Aggregate scores
Source	Rating
Metacritic	56/100
Review scores
Source	Rating
AllMusic	3/5 stars
Billboard	(mixed)
BBC Music	(unfavorable)
Entertainment Weekly	(C+)
The Guardian	3/5 stars
Los Angeles Times	2.5/4 stars
Yahoo! Music UK	(4/10)
DJBooth.net	3/5 stars

Jason Derülo received mixed reviews from critics upon its release, receiving an average score of 56 out of 100, indicating 'mixed or average' reviews, according to music review aggregator Metacritic. The most positive of reviews coming from Los Angeles Times's August Brown who gave the album two and half stars out of four, praising the album for its "array of earnest trance-pop, glossy guitar rock and buttoned-down R&B." and called it "a pleasure-packed debut." He went on to praise Derulo's vocal ability for knowing "exactly when to deploy his Caribbean lilt to ramp up a song's melodrama, and it's one of his best vocal tricks". AllMusic's David Jeffries gave the album three out of five stars criticizing the album for its "overall flow" and for only having nine tracks. Despite this Jeffries went on to praise the album for its ability to "get stuck in your head" and went on to call the album "one to admire rather than advocate", he went on to label the album's music as R&B.

Other reviews were more critical: Entertainment Weekly said that "On Jason Derulo, though, Derulo has trouble making an impression". Dotmusic argued that "Derulo's desperation to cover all commercial bases is only matched by an inability to stamp his own personality on them." The most critical of reviews came from BBC Music's Mike Diver who criticized the album as a whole and called it "a deafening hollowness, an unashamed fakery akin to a dream-state where fantasy and reality have become mixed and hopelessly muddied" and "this soulless Auto-Tune-fest is one to avoid".

== Commercial performance ==
The album debuted at number 11 on the US Billboard 200 with approximately 43,000 copies sold in its first week released. The album debuted at number eight on the UK Albums Chart, and returned to that position in late July following the release of its fourth single "What If". As of April 2012, the album has sold 315,000 copies in the US.

== Track listing ==
No.	Title	Writer(s)	Producer(s)	Length
1.	"Whatcha Say"	Jason Desrouleaux; Kisean Anderson; J-Lex; Leff Row; Jonathan Rotem; Imogen Heap	J.R. Rotem; Fuego	3:42
2.	"Ridin' Solo"	Desrouleaux; Rotem; Xavier Thomas	J.R. Rotem	3:36
3.	"In My Head"	Desrouleaux; Claude Kelly; Rotem	J.R. Rotem	3:20
4.	"The Sky's the Limit"	Desrouleaux; Rotem; Evan Bogart; Alex James; Irene Cara; Keith Forsey; Giorgio Moroder	J.R. Rotem	3:42
5.	"What If"	Desrouleaux; Rotem; Lex	J.R. Rotem	3:22
6.	"Love Hangover"	Desrouleaux; Rotem; Kelly	J.R. Rotem	3:19
7.	"Encore"	Desrouleaux; Rotem; Bogart; Alex James; Larry Nacht; Winston Thomas; Danny Schofield	J.R. Rotem	3:43
8.	"Fallen"	Desrouleaux; Rotem; Bogart; David Quiñones; Erika Nuri; Jerry Flowers; Greg Ogan	J.R. Rotem	3:15
9.	"Blind"	Desrouleaux; Rotem	J.R. Rotem	3:35

North American digital deluxe edition bonus tracks
No.	Title	Writer(s)	Producer (s)	Length
10.	"Whatcha Say" (Acoustic Version)	Desrouleaux; Anderson; J-Lex; Rotem; Heap	J.R. Rotem	3:41
11.	"In My Head" (Rhythm Remix)	Desrouleaux; Faisal; Kelly; Rotem	J.R. Rotem	3:18

North American iTunes Store edition bonus track
No.	Title	Writer(s)	Producer (s)	Length
10.	"Queen of Hearts"	Desrouleaux; Rotem; Kelly	J.R. Rotem	2:57

Canadian, Mexican and Australian Amazon MP3 deluxe edition bonus tracks
No.	Title	Writer(s)	Producer (s)	Length
11.	"Whatcha Say" (Acoustic Version)	Desrouleaux; Anderson; J-Lex; Rotem; Heap	J.R. Rotem	3:41
12.	"In My Head" (Rhythm Remix)	Desrouleaux; Faisal; Kelly; Rotem	J.R. Rotem	3:18

iTunes Store and international Amazon MP3 deluxe edition bonus tracks
No.	Title	Writer(s)	Producer (s)	Length
13.	"Whatcha Say" (music video)	Desrouleaux; Anderson; J-Lex; Rotem; Heap	J.R. Rotem	3:42
14.	"In My Head" (music video)	Desrouleaux; Faisal; Kelly; Rotem	J.R. Rotem; Faisal	3:31

10th anniversary digital deluxe edition bonus tracks
No.	Title	Writer(s)	Producer (s)	Length
13.	"Whatcha Say" (Johnny Vicious Remix)	Desrouleaux; Anderson; J-Lex; Rotem; Heap	J.R. Rotem	7:35
14.	"Ridin' Solo" (Justin Michael and Kemal remix)	Desrouleaux; Rotem; Xavier Thomas	J.R. Rotem	6:16

International edition bonus track
No.	Title	Writer(s)	Producer (s)	Length
10.	"Strobelight"	Desrouleaux; Rotem; Alex James	J.R. Rotem	3:02

French digital edition bonus track
No.	Title	Writer(s)	Producer (s)	Length
11.	"Whatcha Say" (French Version featuring Fanny J)	Desrouleaux; Anderson; J-Lex; Rotem; Heap	J.R. Rotem	3:42

French digital deluxe edition bonus tracks
No.	Title	Writer(s)	Producer (s)	Length
11.	"Whatcha Say" (Acoustic Version)	Desrouleaux; Anderson; J-Lex; Rotem; Heap	J.R. Rotem	3:41
12.	"In My Head" (Rhythm Remix)	Desrouleaux; Faisal; Kelly; Rotem	J.R. Rotem	3:18
13.	"Whatcha Say" (French Version featuring Fanny J)	Desrouleaux; Anderson; J-Lex; Rotem; Heap	J.R. Rotem	3:42

United States and European Amazon MP3 deluxe edition bonus tracks
No.	Title	Writer(s)	Producer (s)	Length
11.	"Whatcha Say" (Acoustic Version)	Desrouleaux; Anderson; J-Lex; Rotem; Heap	J.R. Rotem	3:41
12.	"In My Head" (Rhythm Remix)	Desrouleaux; Faisal; Kelly; Rotem	J.R. Rotem	3:18
13.	"Whatcha Say" (music video)	Desrouleaux; Anderson; J-Lex; Rotem; Heap	J.R. Rotem	3:42
14.	"In My Head" (music video)	Desrouleaux; Faisal; Kelly; Rotem	J.R. Rotem; Faisal	3:31

Japanese edition bonus tracks
No.	Title	Writer(s)	Producer (s)	Length
11.	"Queen of Hearts"	Desrouleaux; Rotem; Kelly	J.R. Rotem	2:57
12.	"In My Head" (Rhythm Remix)	Desrouleaux; Faisal; Kelly; Rotem	J.R. Rotem	3:18
13.	"Whatcha Say" (Acoustic Version)	Desrouleaux; Anderson; J-Lex; Rotem; Heap	J.R. Rotem	3:41
14.	"Whatcha Say" (Klubjumpers Remix Radio)	Desrouleaux; Anderson; J-Lex; Rotem; Heap	J.R. Rotem	4:04
15.	"Whatcha Say" (Johnny Vicious Remix)	Desrouleaux; Anderson; J-Lex; Rotem; Heap	J.R. Rotem	7:35
16.	"Whatcha Say" (Wawa Remix Radio)	Desrouleaux; Anderson; J-Lex; Rotem; Heap	J.R. Rotem	4:24

=== Special edition EP ===
Jason Derulo: Special Edition – EP release
No.	Title	Writer(s)	Producer (s)	Length
1.	"Whatcha Say" (Acoustic Version)	Desrouleaux; Anderson; J-Lex; Rotem; Heap	J.R. Rotem	3:41
2.	"In My Head" (featuring Nicki Minaj)	Desrouleaux; Faisal; Kelly	J.R. Rotem	3:17
3.	"Ridin' Solo" (Acoustic Version)	Desrouleaux; Rotem; Xavier Thomas	J.R. Rotem	3:44
4.	"What If" (Lost Daze Remix)	Desrouleaux; Rotem; Lex	J.R. Rotem	5:02
5.	"Strobelight"	Desrouleaux; Rotem; Alex James	J.R. Rotem	3:02
6.	"The Sky's the Limit" (Wideboys Club Mix)	Desrouleaux; Rotem; Evan Bogart; Alex James; Irene Cara; Keith Forsey; Giorgio Moroder	J.R. Rotem	7:01
Total length:				25:47

Sample credits

- "Whatcha Say" contains elements of "Hide and Seek", performed by Imogen Heap.
- "The Sky's the Limit" contains elements of "Flashdance... What a Feeling", performed by Irene Cara.
- "Love Hangover" contains elements of "Who Can It Be Now?", performed by Men at Work.

== Charts ==
=== Weekly charts ===
Chart (2010)	Peak position
Australian Albums (ARIA)	4
Austrian Albums (Ö3 Austria)	23
Belgian Albums (Ultratop Flanders)	26
Canadian Albums (Billboard)	9
Dutch Albums (Album Top 100)	30
French Albums (SNEP)	79
German Albums (Offizielle Top 100)	49
Greek Albums (IFPI)	17
Irish Albums (IRMA)	10
New Zealand Albums (RMNZ)	5
Norwegian Albums (VG-lista)	38
Scottish Albums (Official Charts)	14
Swedish Albums (Sverigetopplistan)	59
Swiss Albums (Schweizer Hitparade)	13
UK Albums (Official Charts)	8
UK R&B Albums (Official Charts)	2
US Billboard 200	11

=== Year-end charts ===
Chart (2010)	Position
Australian Albums (ARIA)	25
Belgian Albums (Ultratop Flanders)	88
UK Albums (OCC)	49
US Billboard 200	136

== Certifications ==
Region	Certification	Certified units/sales
Australia (ARIA)	Platinum	70,000^{^}
Canada (Music Canada)	Platinum	80,000^{‡}
Denmark (IFPI Danmark)	Platinum	20,000^{‡}
Ireland (IRMA)	Gold	7,500^{^}
New Zealand (RMNZ)	Platinum	15,000^{‡}
Sweden (GLF)	Platinum	40,000^{‡}
United Kingdom (BPI)	Platinum	300,000^{‡}
United States (RIAA)	Platinum	1,000,000^{‡}
^{^} Shipments figures based on certification alone.^{‡} Sales+streaming figures based on certification alone.

== Release history ==
Country	Date	Label
New Zealand	February 26, 2010	Beluga Heights; Warner Bros.
United Kingdom	March 1, 2010	Beluga Heights; Warner Bros.
United States	March 2, 2010	Beluga Heights; Warner Bros.
Canada	March 2, 2010	Beluga Heights; Warner Bros.
Australia	March 5, 2010	Beluga Heights; Warner Bros.
Germany	March 5, 2010	Beluga Heights; Warner Bros.
Japan	March 10, 2010	Warner Bros.
Poland	March 15, 2010	Warner Bros.
Brazil	March 25, 2010	Warner Bros.
