= What If (Jason Derulo song) =

2010 single by Jason Derulo

Single by Jason Derulo

from the album Jason Derulo
- Released: August 9, 2010
- Genre: Pop; R&B
- Length: 3:22
- Label: Beluga Heights; Asylum; Warner Bros.
- Songwriter(s): Jason Desrouleaux; J.R. Rotem
- Producer(s): J. R. Rotem

Jason Derulo singles chronology
| "Ridin' Solo" (2010) | "What If" (2010) | "The Sky's the Limit" (2010) |

"What If" is the fourth single released by American singer Jason Derulo on his self-titled debut album. The single was first released in the UK on July 26, 2010, where it peaked at number 12, marking Derulo's fourth consecutive top-20 hit in the country.

== Chart performance ==
"What If" debuted on the UK Singles Chart at number 40 on July 17, 2010, following the release of the accompanying music video. The single also charted at number 18 on the UK R&B Chart that same week. The following week, the single rose 21 places to number 19, marking Derulo's fourth top-20 single in the UK. Then the following week it rose again to number 12, marking Derulo's fourth top-15 single in the UK. On the same week it rose to number 5 on the UK R&B Chart, marking his fourth top five on the R&B Chart hit member 27, 2010, "What If" debuted at number 76 on the Billboard Hot 100.

== Music video ==
The music video premiered on July 12, 2010, on the music channel program The Official UK Top 40. It was revealed later that week that Ethan Lader was the director for the video. The plot of the video appears to have been inspired by the movie The Butterfly Effect.

The music video begins with Derulo and his girlfriend (actress Laura Alexandra Grau) moving in together, Derulo takes a diamond engagement ring out of the nightstand and puts it in his pocket as she comes into the room. She leaves to get the last box from the moving truck. While walking across the street, a Camry driver who is distracted by texting nearly hits her. Derulo, hearing the skid from the car, runs from the house and towards her to push her out of the way of the car. As he reaches her, the video freezes. A clock on the nightstand begins to tick slower until it eventually stops, then begins going backwards. Time begins to go in reverse, Derulo and his girlfriend's relationship is shown as if the video is being rewound. When the video shows their first meeting, time begins to go forward again. This time, as he walks past her, he does not stop and talk to her. He looks back at her before he continues walking. She disappears from his memories and from a picture. The video ends back on the street, as the car is about to hit his girlfriend, she disappears as does the moving truck and the car continues moving.

== Track listings ==
- CD single and digital download
1. "What If" – 3:22
2. "What If" (Wideboys radio edit) – 3:20
- UK iTunes EP
1. "What If" (album version) – 3:22
2. "What If" (Wideboys radio edit) – 3:20
3. "What If" (Wideboys club mix 5) – 5:50
4. "What If" (Electric Allstars mix) – 3:20
5. "What If" (music video) – 4:15

== Charts and certifications ==
=== Weekly charts ===
| Chart (2010–2011) | Peak position |
|---|---|
| Australia (ARIA) | 32 |
| Austria (Ö3 Austria Top 40) | 35 |
| Belgium (Ultratip Bubbling Under Flanders) | 8 |
| European Hot 100 Singles (Billboard) | 37 |
| Germany (GfK) | 48 |
| Ireland (IRMA) | 16 |
| Netherlands (Dutch Top 40) | 18 |
| New Zealand (Recorded Music NZ) | 27 |
| UK Singles (OCC) | 12 |
| UK Hip Hop/R&B (OCC) | 5 |
| US Billboard Hot 100 | 76 |
| US Pop Airplay (Billboard) | 26 |

=== Certifications ===
| Region | Certification | Certified units/sales |
|---|---|---|
| United Kingdom (BPI) | Silver | 200,000^{‡} |
^{‡} Sales+streaming figures based on certification alone.
