= Say Hello to Goodbye =

Single by Shontelle

from the album No Gravity
- Released: March 15, 2011
- Recorded: 2010
- Genre: Pop-rock
- Length: 3:52
- Label: SRC Records
- Songwriters: Martin Hansen, Shontelle Layne, Hanne Sorvaag
- Producer: Martin Hansen

Shontelle singles chronology
| "Perfect Nightmare" (2010) | "Say Hello to Goodbye" (2011) | "Tonight" (2012) |

"Say Hello to Goodbye" is the third single taken from Barbadian singer Shontelle's second album No Gravity (2010). It was sent to mainstream radio in the United States on March 15, 2011. The music video premiered on VEVO on May 20, 2011. The song was written by Martin Hansen, Shontelle Layne and Hanne Sorvaag.

== Music video ==
A music video to accompany the release of "Say Hello to Goodbye" was first released onto YouTube on May 20, 2011, at a total length of three minutes and fifty-five seconds.

== Track listing ==
Digital download
| No. | Title | Length |
|---|---|---|
| 1. | "Say Hello to Goodbye" | 3:52 |

== Credits and personnel ==
- Lead vocals – Shontelle
- Producers – Martin Hansen
- Lyrics – Martin Hansen, Shontelle Layne, Hanne Sorvaag
- Label: SRC Records

== Chart performance ==
| Chart (2011) | Peak position |
|---|---|
| US Mainstream Top 40 (Billboard) | 30 |

== Release history ==
Release dates and formats for "Say Hello to Goodbye"
| Region | Date | Format | Label(s) | Ref. |
|---|---|---|---|---|
| United States | March 15, 2011 | Mainstream airplay | Universal Motown | |
