= Roll It Gal =

2005 single by Alison Hinds

Single by Alison Hinds

from the album Soca Queen
- Released: 2005 (Barbados); 3 September 2007 (UK)
- Recorded: 2005 (Slam City Recording Studios, Barbados)
- Genre: Dancehall; soca; R&B
- Length: 3:58
- Label: RCG; Black Coral; 1720 Entertainment
- Songwriters: Shelton Benjamin; Shontelle Layne
- Producer: Shelshok

"Roll It Gal" (otherwise known as "Roll It") is a song written by Shontelle Layne and Sheldon Benjamin, and originally recorded by British born-Barbadian singer Alison Hinds, taken from her debut album Soca Queen. The single was released by Hinds in 2005 in Barbados and in the United Kingdom in 2007. A music video was produced for Hinds' version of the song in 2005. The Hinds version of "Roll It Gal" shot to the top of the charts in Barbados, Trinidad and throughout the Caribbean.

In 2007, a re-worked cover of the song entitled "Roll It", performed by J-Status and featuring Rihanna, as well as Shontelle, who assisted in writing both versions of the song, was released in several European countries.

== Original version ==
=== Track listings ===
UK CD single

1. "Roll It Gal" (original/main mix – radio edit) – 3:35
2. "Roll It Gal" (Rishi Rich mix) – 3:29
3. "Roll It Gal" (Machel Montano mix)
4. "Roll It Gal" (Sunland mix)
5. "Roll It Gal" (video)

UK 7" vinyl

1. "Roll It Gal" (original/main mix – radio edit)
2. "Roll It Gal" (Rishi Rich mix)
3. "Roll It Gal" (Sunland mix)

Download remix EP

1. "Roll It Gal" (album version) – 3:58
2. "Roll It Gal" (featuring Machel Montano) – 5:08
3. "Roll It Gal" (featuring Doug E Fresh) – 4:50
4. "Roll It Gal" (Disco Ball remix) – 5:10
5. "Roll It Gal" (Reggaeton remix) – 3:50
6. "Roll It Gal" (Rishi Rich mix)

=== Charts ===
Chart (2007–08)	Peak position
UK Singles Chart	135

== J-Status version ==
"Roll It"

Single by J-Status featuring Rihanna and Shontelle

from the album The Beginning
- Released: 12 February 2007
- Recorded: 2006
- Studio: 2 Hard Studios (Kingston, Jamaica)
- Genre: Dancehall; R&B
- Length: 3:58
- Label: SRP Recordings
- Songwriters: Benjamin; Layne
- Producers: Evan Rogers; Carl Sturken

J-Status singles chronology
"Roll It" (2007)

Rihanna singles chronology
"Break It Off" (2006)	"Roll It" (2007)	"Umbrella" (2007)

Shontelle and Sheldon Benjamin, the composers of "Roll It Gal" re-wrote and re-produced the song for the Barbadian group J-Status, changing the lyrics from being about female empowerment to more sexual lyrics, re-titling the song to "Roll It". The J-Status version is taken from their debut album The Beginning, released in several European countries only. The J-Status version is performed with fellow Barbadian singers Rihanna and Shontelle herself.

=== Track listing ===
CD

1. "Roll It" (featuring Rihanna and Shontelle) (radio version) – 3:32
2. "Roll It" (featuring Rihanna and Shontelle) (main version) – 3:58
3. "Roll It" (instrumental) – 3:23
4. "Roll It" (featuring Rihanna and Shontelle) (Reggaeton Gemstar version) – 4:10
5. "Roll It" (featuring Rihanna and Shontelle) (Sunset Strippers remix) – 7:42
6. "Roll It" (featuring Rihanna and Shontelle) (video)

=== Charts ===
Chart (2007–08)	Peak position
Finland (Suomen virallinen lista)	8
Germany (GfK)	33
Switzerland (Schweizer Hitparade)	89

== Other versions ==
In 2007, Shontelle finally recorded her own version of "Roll It" and it later appeared on her debut studio album Shontelligence (2008).

=== Track listing ===
Digital download

1. "Roll" – 3:30
