= In My Head (Jason Derulo song) =

2009 single by Jason Derulo

Single by Jason Derulo

from the album Jason Derülo
- Released: December 10, 2009
- Recorded: 2009
- Genre: Dance-pop; pop rock; R&B
- Length: 3:19
- Label: Beluga Heights; Asylum; Warner Bros.
- Songwriters: Jason Desrouleaux; Claude Kelly; J. R. Rotem
- Producer: J. R. Rotem

Jason Derulo singles chronology
"Whatcha Say" (2009)	"In My Head" (2009)	"Ridin' Solo" (2010)

"In My Head" is a song by American singer Jason Derulo, released as the second single from his self-titled debut studio album. It was first released on December 10, 2009. "In My Head" peaked at number five on the Billboard Hot 100. Outside of the United States, "In My Head" topped the charts in Australia, Poland, and the United Kingdom, and peaked within the top ten of the charts in several other countries, including Canada, Germany, and New Zealand. The song's official remix has a heavier R&B sound and features rapper Nicki Minaj. Derulo performed the song on the ninth season of American Idol.

== Background ==
Producer J. R. Rotem stated in a 2025 interview that the song was initially titled "In My Bed," but the label deemed the title "too edgy," so it was changed to "In My Head." The official remix of the song features Nicki Minaj and was released on March 11, 2010.

== Chart performance ==
"In My Head" debuted on the Billboard Hot 100 at number 63 for the week ending December 26, 2009. It has since become Derulo's second song to reach the top 10, peaking at number five. On June 22, 2010, the song certified double platinum by the RIAA. As of April 23, 2014, the single has sold over 3,174,000 digital copies, making it his second single to cross the 3 million mark. In Canada, the song peaked at number two on the Canadian Hot 100 in the issue dated March 13, 2010, becoming Derulo's second top three single in Canada.

In Australia, the song peaked at the top of the ARIA Singles Chart, and was the only song to debut at number one in Australia in 2010. It has been certified 7× Platinum in Australia, making it one of the country's best-selling singles of all time.

In the United Kingdom, "In My Head" debuted at the top of the UK Singles Chart on February 28, 2010 – for the week ending date March 6, 2010 – making it Derulo's first chart-topping song in Britain and second consecutive top 10 hit there. In the same week, "In My Head" also became Derulo's second consecutive chart-topper on the UK R&B Singles Chart. In Ireland, the song debuted and peaked at number three on the Irish Singles Chart on February 25, 2010.

== Music video ==
The music video was filmed in late December 2009 and released on January 23, 2010, via YouTube. The video begins in the parking lot of a convenience store, with Derulo leaning on a car with some friends when he eventually spots the female lead (played by Lala Escarzega) leaving the store. Derulo is staring at her (with his debut single "Whatcha Say" playing in the background), and eventually he goes up and talks to her and starts singing to her. The video is an extensive dancing video with Derulo dancing near the car with the female lead, in the occasional breakaways, and far more extensively with two male dancers during the bridge of the song. The music video occasionally breaks away to Derulo's silhouette dancing in the fog. Eventually the girl he is dreaming about has joined him. In the end it is revealed that the entire music video was all in Derulo's head, and the beginning scene is shown again with the female lead exiting the store, heard asking Derulo if they had ever met before. As with the beginning, "Whatcha Say" is also played in the end. The video was directed by Kai Crawford with the Choreographer Kevin Maher.

== Track listing ==
- Digital download
1. "In My Head" – 3:19
- CD single
1. "In My Head" – 3:19
2. "In My Head" (Rhythm Remix) – 3:19
- In My Head EP
1. "In My Head" (Remix) (featuring Nicki Minaj) – 3:17
2. "In My Head" (Klubjumpers Extended) – 5:58
3. "In My Head" (Wideboys Club Mix) – 5:19
4. "In My Head" (Wideboys Radio Edit) – 3:13
- Promo CD single
1. "In My Head" – 3:23
2. "In My Head" (Wideboys Radio Edit) – 3:20
3. "In My Head" (Wideboys Club) – 5:26
4. "In My Head" (Wideboys Dub) – 5:36
- "In My Head" (Klubjumpers) single
1. "In My Head" (Klubjumpers) – 3:04
- "In My Head" (Red Top Club Mix) single
1. "In My Head" (Red Top Club Mix) – 6:13
- "In My Head" (Wideboys Club Mix) single
1. "In My Head" (Wideboys Club Mix) – 5:19
- "In My Head" (Wideboys Radio Edit) single
1. "In My Head" (Wideboys Radio Edit) – 3:13

== Charts ==
=== Weekly charts ===
Chart (2010)	Peak position
Australia (ARIA)	1
Austria (Ö3 Austria Top 40)	15
Belgium (Ultratop 50 Flanders)	14
Belgium (Ultratop 50 Wallonia)	31
Canada Hot 100 (Billboard)	2
Canada AC (Billboard)	43
Canada CHR/Top 40 (Billboard)	1
Canada Hot AC (Billboard)	3
Czech Republic Airplay (ČNS IFPI)	12
Denmark (Tracklisten)	20
Finland (Suomen virallinen lista)	19
France (SNEP) Download Charts	49
Germany (GfK)	9
Hungary (Rádiós Top 40)	12
Ireland (IRMA)	3
Israel International Airplay (Media Forest)	9
Italy (FIMI)	32
Mexico Airplay (Billboard)	27
Netherlands (Dutch Top 40)	13
Netherlands (Single Top 100)	43
New Zealand (Recorded Music NZ)	2
Norway (VG-lista)	6
Poland Airplay (ZPAV)	1
Scottish Singles Sales (Official Charts)	1
Slovakia Airplay (ČNS IFPI)	16
Spain (Promusicae)	12
Sweden (Sverigetopplistan)	13
Switzerland (Schweizer Hitparade)	20
UK Singles (Official Charts)	1
UK Hip Hop/R&B (Official Charts)	1
US Billboard Hot 100	5
US Adult Contemporary (Billboard)	26
US Adult Pop Airplay (Billboard)	12
US Dance Club Songs (Billboard)	28
US Pop Airplay (Billboard)	1
US Rhythmic Airplay (Billboard)	5

=== Year-end charts ===
Chart (2010)	Position
Australia (ARIA)	13
Austria (Ö3 Austria Top 40)	75
Belgium (Ultratop Flanders)	77
Brazil (Crowley)	66
Canada (Canadian Hot 100)	12
European Hot 100 Singles	57
Germany (Official German Charts)	49
Hungary (Rádiós Top 40)	47
Netherlands (Dutch Top 40)	68
Sweden (Sverigetopplistan)	74
Switzerland (Schweizer Hitparade)	68
UK Singles (OCC)	40
US Billboard Hot 100	14
US Adult Top 40 (Billboard)	41
US Mainstream Top 40 (Billboard)	6
US Rhythmic (Billboard)	25

== Certifications ==
Region	Certification	Certified units/sales
Australia (ARIA)	7× Platinum	490,000^{^}
Austria (IFPI Austria)	Gold	15,000^{*}
Canada (Music Canada)	3× Platinum	240,000^{‡}
Denmark (IFPI Danmark)	Platinum	90,000^{‡}
Germany (BVMI)	Gold	150,000^{^}
New Zealand (RMNZ)	2× Platinum	60,000^{‡}
United Kingdom (BPI)	Platinum	600,000^{‡}
United States (RIAA)	4× Platinum	4,000,000^{‡}
^{*} Sales figures based on certification alone.^{^} Shipments figures based on certification alone.^{‡} Sales+streaming figures based on certification alone.

== Brian Joo version ==
"In My Head"

Single by Brian Joo
- Released: March 3, 2010 (South Korea)
- Recorded: 2010
- Genre: Dance-pop; synthpop
- Length: 4:09
- Songwriters: Jason Desrouleaux; Claude Kelly; J.R. Rotem
- Producers: J. R. Rotem; Max Martin

On March 3, 2010, Korean-American singer Brian Joo released a Korean version of the song. That same day the Korean single for Derulo's original version was also released in Korea. A music video for the song has been recorded. Derulo promoted the song in Korea with Joo on several music show performances. A special Club Remix has also been released and features both Brian Joo and Jason Derulo singing together.

No.	Title	Length
1.	"In My Head"	3:20
2.	"In My Head" (Instrumental)	3:20
3.	"In My Head" (Club Remix) (featuring Jason Derulo) (Limited Bonus Track))	3:20
