= T-Shirt (Shontelle song) =

2008 single by Shontelle

Single by Shontelle

from the album Shontelligence
- B-side: "Blaze It Up"
- Released: July 15, 2008
- Genre: R&B
- Length: 3:54 (album version); 3:32 (video edit); 3:12 (radio edit)
- Label: SRC; Motown
- Songwriters: Andrew Frampton; Wayne Wilkins; Savan Kotecha
- Producers: Wayne Wilkins; Andrew Frampton

Shontelle singles chronology
"Roll It" (2007)	"T-Shirt" (2008)	"Stuck with Each Other" (2008)

"T-Shirt" is the first solo single released by Barbadian singer Shontelle from her album Shontelligence (2008). It is her second official single following the release of 2007's "Roll It" which was released only in select European countries. A remix, featuring The-Dream, is included on her second album, No Gravity (2010). The single peaked at number 36 on the Billboard Hot 100 in the United States and number 41 on the Canadian Hot 100 in Canada. Outside of North America, "T-Shirt" peaked within the top ten of the charts in the United Kingdom, where the song was certified gold by the British Phonographic Industry.

== Release and promotion ==
"T-Shirt" was sent to top 40 radio stations in the United States on July 15, 2008, and was released in the United Kingdom on February 23, 2009. Shontelle and her label gave artists a chance to release their own remixed version of the song, which was to be serviced to DJs with the winner promoted as a featured artist.

Speaking in February 2009 to noted British R&B writer Pete Lewis of Blues & Soul, Shontelle explained the significance to her of the song: "I really like 'T-Shirt' a lot because, when you listen to the song, there's a lot of elements in there that will definitely appeal to girls. Like even the strongest women at some point can have that guy in their life who, if for some reason you can't be with him, is gonna have that effect on you where you're not gonna feel like going out, hanging out with your girlfriends, partying, or doing ANYTHING. And, if you do miss that person, the best thing to have of theirs is a T-shirt! Because it usually smells like them and you can put it on, curl up with it - and kinda pretend the person is THERE!"

== Critical reception ==
Nick Levine of Digital Spy gave the song 3/5 stars and said:

'T-Shirt', her debut single, is a cute midtempo R&B tune with lyrics about popping on your boyfriend's top when you're missing him. It sounds like it was produced by Stargate, the Norwegian hitmakers behind Rihanna's 'Take a Bow' and Chris Brown's 'With You', even though it actually wasn't. Original? Nah, not in the slightest. Likable? Absolutely - though Shontelle's vocals lack the distinctive bit of rough that helps her countrywoman to stand out from the crowd.

Steve Perkins of BBC Chart Blog also gave the song 3/5 stars and said:

There's something rather sweet and gentle about the track - Shontelle's vocals are soft and plaintive, which suit the mood of the song perfectly, and while the lyrics are a bit hackneyed, with the references to Jimmy Choos and the brand name product placement of a t-shirt brand which, quite unlike the t-shirt in the song, is ill-fitting and uncomfortable, there's something incredibly likeable about the whole thing. There's a universality to it, too - I think most of us have been in a situation like the one in the song where thoughts of a lover who's gone get in the way of your attempts to get on with your life.

== Music video ==
Shontelle alluding the theme of the song wearing her boyfriend's T-shirt in the music video.

The official music video for "T-Shirt" was directed by Mike Ruiz.

It features Shontelle in various scenes around her home mainly lying on a sofa in a T-shirt belonging to her partner who is away a lot. She wears it as a symbol of her missing him and chooses to stay at home painting, wearing his T-shirt rather than going for a night out with her friends. It shows her and her friends texting each other and her friends getting annoyed she is not going with them. Throughout much of the video Shontelle is seen in her boyfriend's apartment, barefoot and wearing his white t-shirt. This is also intercut with scenes of her entering and looking around the apartment in a pink halter-neck dress and the Jimmy Choo high heels shoes referenced in the song's chorus. Late in the song we see Shontelle looking through her boyfriend's closet, slipping off her dress and taking her shoes off as she puts on the titular t-shirt. The video ends with her boyfriend returning from his trip and Shontelle smiling.

An official remix video was made for the Bimbo Jones version.

== Chart performance ==
In the United States, the song peaked at number 15 on the Billboard Mainstream Chart, according to Radio and Records magazine CHR/Top 40 National Airplay Chart. The song peaked at number 36 on the Billboard Hot 100 chart and number 15 on the Pop Songs chart. In Canada, it peaked at number 41 on the Canadian Hot 100.

In the United Kingdom, "T-Shirt" climbed into the top ten of the UK Singles Chart at number ten on February 15, 2009 – for the week ending date February 21, 2009 – during its fifth week on the chart, climbing from its previous position at number 13, and becoming Shontelle's first top ten song in Britain. The following week, the song climbed to its peak position of number six on the chart. "T-Shirt" topped the UK R&B Singles Chart and peaked at number two on the UK Physical Chart. The song was certified silver by the British Phonographic Industry.

In Ireland, the song reached the top 30 of the Irish Singles Chart.

== Track listings ==
US digital download

1. "T-Shirt" (radio edit) – 3.12

UK (CD and download track listing)

1. "T-Shirt" (UK radio edit) – 3.12
2. "T-Shirt" (Bimbo Jones vocal remix) – 5.39
3. "T-Shirt" (Crazy Cousinz vocal remix) – 5.35
4. "Blaze It Up" – 3.53

No Gravity

10. "T-Shirt" (Radio Killa Remix) (featuring The-Dream) – 3:53

== Charts ==
=== Weekly charts ===
Chart (2008–2009)	Peak position
Belgium (Ultratip Bubbling Under Flanders)	7
Canada Hot 100 (Billboard)	41
Canada CHR/Top 40 (Billboard)	23
Canada Hot AC (Billboard)	50
Euro Digital Songs (Billboard)	10
Ireland (IRMA)	26
Scottish Singles Sales (Official Charts)	9
UK Singles (Official Charts)	6
UK Hip Hop/R&B (Official Charts)	1
US Billboard Hot 100	36
US Dance Club Songs (Billboard)	1
US Dance Airplay (Billboard)	19
US Pop Airplay (Billboard)	15
US Rhythmic Airplay (Billboard)	31

=== Year-end charts ===
Chart (2009)	Position
UK Singles (OCC)	79
US Hot Dance Club Play (Billboard)	50

== Certifications ==
Region	Certification	Certified units/sales
United Kingdom (BPI)	Platinum	600,000^{‡}
^{‡} Sales+streaming figures based on certification alone.

== See also ==
- List of number-one R&B hits of 2009 (UK)
- List of number-one dance singles of 2009 (U.S.)
