= Shontelle =

Barbadian singer (born 1985)

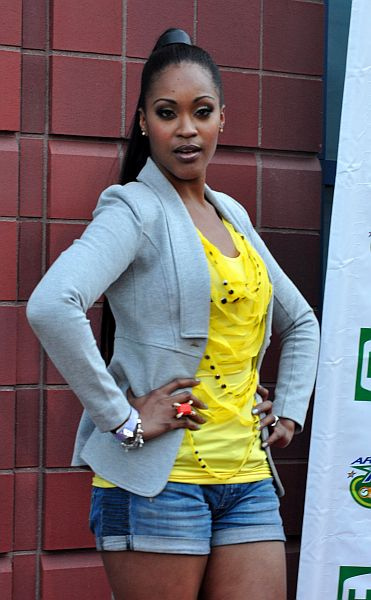
- Shontelle in 2010

Background information
- Born: Shontelle Delia Layne; 4 October 1985 (age 41); Saint James, Barbados
- Genres: R&B; pop; reggae; hip hop
- Occupations: Singer; songwriter
- Years active: 2008–present
- Labels: SRC; Motown; Universal Republic; Republic
- Website: shontelleonline.com

Shontelle Delia Layne (born 4 October 1985), known mononymously as Shontelle, is a Barbadian singer and songwriter. She released her debut album Shontelligence in 2008. Her second album, No Gravity, was released in 2010. Her singles "T-Shirt" and "Impossible" achieved international success. In 2020, Shontelle released "Remember Me".

== Career ==
=== 2008–2009: Shontelligence ===
Shontelle began work on her debut studio album in early 2008, and completed the album in six months. The album's title was given to her by the album's engineer who used the word "shontelligence" as a joke after Shontelle and her producers were playing a game that involved making up words from her name. "T-Shirt", Shontelle's debut single, was released in July 2008 and reached number thirty-six on the US Billboard Hot 100, becoming a moderate hit. However, it peaked within the top ten of the charts in Belgium and the United Kingdom.

Shontelle's debut album, Shontelligence, was released on 18 November 2008. The album reached number 115 on the US Billboard 200, selling 6,200 records in its first week, and reached number twenty-four on the R&B/Hip-Hop Albums chart. It was re-released on 10 March 2009, and has since sold 30,000 records in the US.

The second single from the album, "Stuck with Each Other", featuring Akon, was released in February 2009 in the US and May 2009 in the UK. The single failed to chart in the US, but reached number 23 in the United Kingdom. Shontelle toured as a supporting act for the UK leg of the New Kids on the Block World Tour in January 2009. Shontelle was also Beyoncé's opening act for her I Am... World Tour from May to June 2009 during the British leg. Shontelle Also began writing songs for many artists in Barbados including the 2007 crop over hit Roll It Gyal for the Queen of Soca Alison Hinds and the 2018 crop over hit Winners for Shanta Prince. Shontelle was also the host of My Prom Style! and Universal Motown's 2009 Ultimate Prom fashion reality series. She performed at a high school prom in New York City in June 2009, but first she led three students in a competition to design the dress that singer Kat DeLuna, the headliner, would wear at the Ultimate Prom concert. Shontelle As of 2012, Shontelligence has sold 50,000 copies in the US.

=== 2009–2010: No Gravity ===
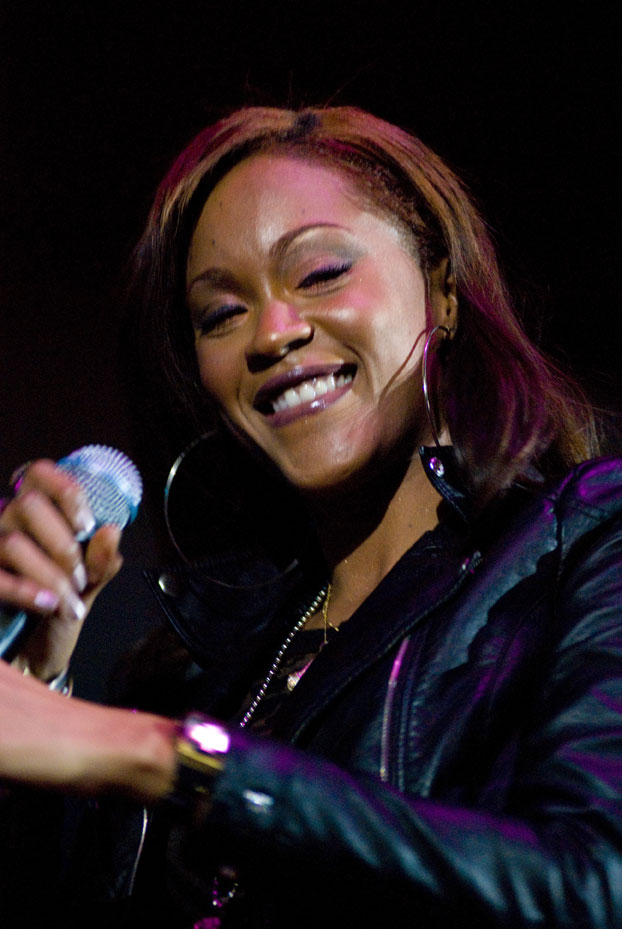
Shontelle performing in 2008

Shontelle's second album, No Gravity, was released in the US on 21 September 2010. Shontelle stated that the album would be experimental and that she wanted to change her original sound for the record. While the title 'No Gravity' symbolises a mantra, she stated that she has adapted to her life and to her career, to motivate herself to keep climbing higher and to have nothing hold her down or hold her back. Shontelle collaborated with Bruno Mars, Tony Kanal and Darkchild among others for the record. In the first week of release, No Gravity placed at number eighty-one on the Billboard 200, selling 7,000 copies. Later that year Shontelle would co-write Rihanna's song "Man Down" from her fifth studio album, Loud (2010). The two had met in the army cadets, where Shontelle was Rihanna's drill sergeant.

The lead single from the album, "Impossible", was released in February 2010 for digital download, but failed to garner success until May of that year, when it debuted on the Billboard Hot 100. It has since become her most successful single to date, reaching number thirteen on the Billboard Hot 100. The second single from the album, "Perfect Nightmare", was released in August 2010. "Say Hello to Goodbye" was sent to pop radio on 15 March 2011, as the third single. Both failed to chart on the Hot 100, but did make it onto the Pop songs chart. No Gravity has sold an estimated 150,000 copies in the US as of 2012.

=== 2011–present: Move to Republic Records, Boomerang, and Tokyo Nights ===
Shontelle played at GUMBO @ The Canal Room in New York City on 15 July 2011, where she revealed news about an upcoming single and third studio album. It was also revealed that she had departed from Universal Motown and had joined Universal Republic. The lead single from the upcoming album is called "Reflection" and it premiered on SoundCloud in September 2011. Songs from the album were expected to be previewed at Shontelle's birthday bash. Amongst those confirmed to be working on the album were Rockwilder, Tony Kanal, and The Runners. A restructure at Universal Music Group meant that Motown Records was separated from Universal Motown Republic Group and merged with The Island Def Jam Music Group. Universal Republic was shut down and all of the artists on the label were transferred to the newly revived Republic Records. Shontelle is now recording for Republic Records. In December 2012, Shontelle confirmed that "Put Me on Blast" would be the lead single from her upcoming third studio album, and that she had already filmed the music video for the single in Los Angeles. Her third album was scheduled for release in 2013, but never materialized, and no future dates have been announced.

On 4 November 2017, she performed and was a guest judge in Miss Earth 2017 held in Manila. In 2021, Shontelle will co-star in the Amazon Prime film Joseph and also signed with Shakir Entertainment Management in New York City for television and film.

On 14 March 2020, Shontelle released her promo single "Remember Me" as an introduction into her new era. On 9 April 2021, Shontelle collaborated on the single "Let You Go" with Supasoaka and Arpad.

On 29 October 2021, Shontelle released the lead single "Sanctify" off her upcoming untilted EP. On 14 January 2022, Shontelle released the single "Be the One" as the second single from the EP. Shontelle released the promotional single "No More" as the Metheors Theme Song, on 14 March 2022. On 27 May 2022, Shontelle released her EP titled Boomerang which includes the new songs "Boomerang" and "Live It Up" as well as remixes and acoustic mixes. On July 11, 2024, Shontelle released her third studio album, Tokyo Nights.

== Philanthropy ==
Shontelle is also known for her involvement in charity work. She used her talent to help raise funds for patients with Alzheimer's through the Together for Care concert, girl's education for She's the First, VH1 Save the Music Foundation, and breast cancer research charities.

== Discography ==
Studio albums

- Shontelligence (2008)
- No Gravity (2010)
- Tokyo Nights (2024)

== Tours ==
- 2009: I Am... World Tour (supporting act)
- 2010: To the Sky Tour by Kevin Rudolf (supporting act)
- 2010/11: Jason Derulo World Tour (supporting act)

=== Other performances ===
- On 2 December 2010, Shontelle co-headlined Electric 94.9's Acoustic Christmas along with 3OH!3 in Kingsport, TN.
- On 27 February 2011, Shontelle played a headlining gig at 90 Degrees Pub in Southampton.
- On 28 February 2011, Shontelle played a headlining gig at Glam Nightclub in Cardiff.
- On 15 May 2011, Shontelle played a co-headlining show at Star 102.1's Star Jam in Pigeon Forge, TN.
- On 3 July 2011, Shontelle performed in Altamonte Springs, Florida at Red, Hot and Boom.
- On 13 October 2015, Shontelle performed at the 100-year-anniversary celebration gala of Big Brothers Big Sisters (South Eastern Pennsylvania) at the Kimmel Center in Philadelphia.
- On 4 November 2017, Shontelle was the Special Guest Performer at the 2017 Miss Earth pageant held at the Mall of Asia Arena in the Philippines.
