= Platinum Hits (Jason Derulo album) =

Greatest hits album by Jason Derulo
- Released: July 29, 2016
- Recorded: 2009–2016
- Genre: Dance-pop; R&B
- Length: 41:42
- Label: Beluga Heights; Warner Bros.
- Producer: J.R. Rotem; Ricky Reed; Ian Kirkpatrick; Axident; Honua Music; Jon Bellion; Fuego; Emanuel Kiriakou; Jonas Jeberg; Ammo; Heather Jeanette; Tim Roberts; The Fliptones; Thomas Troelsen; Thomas Eriksen

Jason Derulo chronology
| Everything Is 4 (2015) | Platinum Hits (2016) | 2Sides (Side 1) (2019) |

Singles from Platinum Hits
- 1. "Kiss the Sky" Released: July 29, 2016

Platinum Hits is the first greatest hits album by American singer Jason Derulo, released on July 29, 2016, by Beluga Heights Records and Warner Bros. Records. The album contains 11 previously released singles from Jason Derulo (2010), Future History (2011), Tattoos (2013), Talk Dirty (2014) and Everything Is 4 (2015) along with a new song titled "Kiss the Sky" from the soundtrack to Storks (2016).

== Background and release ==
The release of Platinum Hits was announced by Derulo on July 29, 2016. The compilation album consists of all of his singles which have been certified platinum or multi-platinum by RIAA.

== Promotion ==
"Kiss the Sky" was released as the lead single from the album, and is also featured on the soundtrack of the 2016 animated film Storks.

== Commercial performance ==
The album debuted at number 83 on the Billboard 200 with 7,000 equivalent album units in its first week.

== Track listing ==
Platinum Hits track listing
| No. | Title | Writer(s) | Original album | Length |
|---|---|---|---|---|
| 1. | "Want to Want Me" | Jason Desrouleaux; Ian Kirkpatrick; Samuel Martin; Lindy Robbins; Mitch Allan | Everything Is 4, 2015 | 3:27 |
| 2. | "Talk Dirty" (featuring 2 Chainz) | Desrouleaux; Eric Frederic; Tauheed Epps; Jason Evigan; Sean Douglas; Ori Kaplan; Tamir Muskat; Tomer Yosef | Tattoos, 2013 | 2:57 |
| 3. | "Wiggle" (featuring Snoop Dogg) | Desrouleaux; Frederic; Axident; Jacob Kasher; Douglas; John Ryan; Joe Spargur; Calvin Broadus | Talk Dirty, 2014 | 3:13 |
| 4. | "Trumpets" | Desrouleaux; Jon Bellion | Tattoos | 3:37 |
| 5. | "Whatcha Say" (2016 Platinum Hits Edition) | Desrouleaux; J.R. Rotem; Kisean Anderson; Achraf Baachaoui; J-Lex; Leff Row; Imogen Heap | Jason Derulo, 2010 | 3:42 |
| 6. | "Ridin' Solo" (2016 Platinum Hits Edition) | Desrouleaux; Rotem; Xavier Thomas | Jason Derulo | 3:36 |
| 7. | "It Girl" | Desrouleaux; Emanuel Kiriakou; E. Kidd Bogart; Lindy Robbins | Future History, 2011 | 3:12 |
| 8. | "Marry Me" | Desrouleaux; Jonas Jeberg; Marlin "Hookman" Bonds; Andy Marvel | Tattoos | 3:45 |
| 9. | "The Other Side" | Desrouleaux; Martin Johnson; Joshua Coleman | Tattoos | 3:47 |
| 10. | "Don't Wanna Go Home" | Desrouleaux; Chaz Mishan; David Delazyn; William Attaway; Irving Burgie; Allen George; Fred McFarlane | Future History | 3:26 |
| 11. | "In My Head" (2016 Platinum Hits Edition) | Desrouleaux; Rotem; Claude Kelly | Jason Derulo | 3:18 |
| 12. | "Kiss the Sky" | Desrouleaux; Thomas Troelsen; Bonnie McKee; Madison Love; Michael Caren; Terius Nash | | 3:42 |
| Total length: | | | | 41:42 |

== Personnel ==
- Jason Derulo – lead vocals (all tracks)
- 2 Chainz – vocals (track 2)
- Snoop Dogg – vocals (track 3)
- J.R. Rotem – production (tracks 5, 6, 11)
- Ricky Reed – production (tracks 2, 3)
- Ian Kirkpatrick – production (track 1)
- Axident – production (track 3)
- Honua Music – production (track 3)
- Jon Bellion – production (track 4)
- Fuego – production (track 5)
- Emanuel Kiriakou – production (track 7)
- Jonas Jeberg – production (track 8)
- Ammo – production (track 9)
- Heather Jeanette – production (track 10)
- Tim Roberts – production (track 10)
- The Fliptones – production (track 10)
- Thomas Troelsen – production (track 112)
- Thomas Eriksen – production (track 12)
- John Ryan – co-production (track 3)
- Joe London – co-production (track 3)

== Charts ==
=== Weekly charts ===
Weekly chart performance for Platinum Hits
| Chart (2016–2020) | Peak position |
|---|---|
| Australian Albums (ARIA) | 45 |
| Belgian Albums (Ultratop Flanders) | 97 |
| Belgian Albums (Ultratop Wallonia) | 119 |
| Dutch Albums (Album Top 100) | 98 |
| Irish Albums (OCC) | 43 |
| Spanish Albums (PROMUSICAE) | 70 |
| UK Albums (OCC) | 46 |
| US Billboard 200 | 68 |

=== Year-end charts ===
2019 year-end chart performance for Platinum Hits
| Chart (2019) | Position |
|---|---|
| Australian Albums (ARIA) | 96 |

2020 year-end chart performance for Platinum Hits
| Chart (2020) | Position |
|---|---|
| Australian Albums (ARIA) | 72 |
| UK Albums (OCC) | 82 |

2021 year-end chart performance for Platinum Hits
| Chart (2021) | Position |
|---|---|
| Australian Albums (ARIA) | 74 |

2022 year-end chart performance for Platinum Hits
| Chart (2022) | Position |
|---|---|
| Australian Albums (ARIA) | 92 |

== Certifications ==
Certifications for Platinum Hits
| Region | Certification | Certified units/sales |
|---|---|---|
| New Zealand (RMNZ) | Platinum | 15,000^{‡} |
| United Kingdom (BPI) | Platinum | 300,000^{‡} |
^{‡} Sales+streaming figures based on certification alone.
