= Tattoos World Tour =

2014 concert tour by Jason Derulo

- Tour by Jason Derulo
- Promotional poster for the tour
- Associated album: Tattoos
- Start date: February 22, 2014
- End date: May 10, 2014
- Legs: 2
- No. of shows: 25 in Europe; 8 in Australasia; 33 Total

Jason Derulo concert chronology
- AOL AIM presents: Jason Derülo (2010–11); Tattoos World Tour (2014); Talk Dirty Tour (2014–15)

Tattoos World Tour was a world tour by R&B and pop singer Jason Derulo. It was his second headlining world tour and his first headlining tour since he broke a vertebra in January 2012 while rehearsing for his Future History World Tour, leading to its cancellation. The tour made stops in most parts of Europe and Australia, with Conor Maynard as his opening act. Due to popular demand after the March 20 and March 22, 2014, shows in England had sold out, two more dates were added to the March show line-up, on March 25 and March 27, 2014, in Newcastle at the O_{2} Academy auditorium and in Leeds at the Leeds Academy, with another show added during the second leg of the tour in Rabat, Morocco in Africa.

== Background ==
On September 30, 2013 during a promotional visit in Australia for his third studio album Tattoos Derulo announced that he would be returning to Australia in 2014 for a national tour starting in April and ending in May. It will be his first headlining tour since he broke a vertebra in January 2012 while rehearsing for his Future History World tour, leading to its cancellation. "I had to cancel my last tour, so this one will be something special. I’m already planning it" Derulo states when talking about his preparation for the tour.

Pre-sale tickets for the Australian leg of the tour went on sale on Tuesday, October 8. Regular tickets went on sale Friday, October 11, 2013 On October 8, 2013, Derulo announced additional dates in the UK, Ireland and other parts of Europe for March 2014. The tickets went on sale on October 11. On November 1, 2013, Derulo announced through his official Twitter account that Conor Maynard would be the supporting act for the European leg of the tour. Due to popular demand after the March 20 and March 22, 2014 shows in England had sold out, two more dates were added to the March show line-up. On March 25 and March 27, 2014 in Newcastle at the O2 Academy Newcastle arena and in Leeds at the Leeds Academy, with another show added during the second leg of the tour in Rabat, Morocco in Africa. More dates to be announced.

== Opening acts ==
- Conor Maynard (United Kingdom)
- Ricki-Lee Coulter (Australia)
- Molly Sandén (Stockholm)
- Titanium (Auckland)

== Setlist ==
The following setlist was obtained from the concert on March 20, 2014, held at the O_{2} Apollo Manchester in Manchester, England. It does not represent all concerts for the duration of the tour.

1. "In My Head"
2. "Whatcha Say"
3. "Stupid Love"
4. "Ridin' Solo"
5. "Marry Me"
6. "The Other Side"
7. "It Girl"
8. "Breathing"
9. "Fight For You"
10. "With The Lights On"
11. "Royals"
12. "Vertigo"
13. "Side FX"
14. "Don't Wanna Go Home"
15. "The Other Side" (Reprise)
16. "Talk Dirty"

Encore

17. "Wiggle"
18. "Trumpets"

== Tour dates ==
| Date | City | Country | Venue |
|---|---|---|---|
Europe
| February 22, 2014 | Paris | France | Le Trianon |
| February 23, 2014 | Brussels | Belgium | Forest National |
| February 24, 2014 | Amsterdam | Netherlands | Heineken Music Hall |
| February 26, 2014 | Oslo | Norway | Sentrum Scene |
| February 28, 2014 | Helsinki | Finland | The Circus |
| March 2, 2014 | Stockholm | Sweden | Fryshuset |
| March 3, 2014 | Copenhagen | Denmark | Vega Musikkens Hus |
| March 5, 2014 | Hamburg | Germany | Alsterdorfer Sporthalle |
| March 6, 2014 | Essen | Germany | Grugahalle |
| March 7, 2014 | Offenbach | Germany | Stadthalle Offenbach |
| March 9, 2014 | Zürich | Switzerland | X-tra |
| March 10, 2014 | Milan | Italy | Discoteca Alcatraz |
| March 12, 2014 | Vienna | Austria | Bank Austria Halle |
| March 13, 2014 | Munich | Germany | Zenith |
| March 14, 2014 | Berlin | Germany | Columbiahalle |
| March 19, 2014 | Cardiff | Wales | Motorpoint Arena |
| March 20, 2014 | Manchester | England | O_{2} Apollo Manchester |
| March 22, 2014 | Birmingham | England | National Indoor Arena |
| March 24, 2014 | London | England | Eventim Apollo |
| March 25, 2014 | Newcastle | England | O_{2} Academy Newcastle |
| March 27, 2014 | Leeds | England | O_{2} Academy Leeds |
| March 28, 2014 | Bournemouth | England | Windsor Hall |
| March 30, 2014 | Dublin | Ireland | The O_{2} |
| March 31, 2014 | Glasgow | Scotland | O_{2} Academy Glasgow |
| April 2, 2014 | Ludwigsburg | Germany | MHPArena |
Australasia
| April 24, 2014 | Auckland | New Zealand | Vector Arena |
| April 26, 2014 | Melbourne | Australia | Rod Laver Arena |
| April 29, 2014 | Canberra | Australia | Royal Theatre |
| May 1, 2014 | Newcastle | Australia | Newcastle Entertainment Centre |
| May 3, 2014 | Brisbane | Australia | Brisbane Entertainment Centre |
| May 5, 2014 | Sydney | Australia | Qantas Credit Union Arena |
| May 8, 2014 | Adelaide | Australia | Adelaide Entertainment Centre |
| May 10, 2014 | Perth | Australia | Perth Arena |
