= Stupid Love (Jason Derulo song) =

Single by Jason Derulo

from the album Tattoos and Talk Dirty
- Released: March 24, 2014
- Recorded: 2013
- Genre: R&B
- Length: 3:34
- Label: Warner Bros.
- Songwriters: Jason Desrouleaux; RedOne; Novel Jannusi; Aleena Gibson; Molly Sandén; Rush; Jordan Sapp
- Producers: RedOne; Rush; BeatGeek

Jason Derulo singles chronology
"Trumpets" (2013)	"Stupid Love" (2014)	"Wiggle" (2014)

Music video
- "Stupid Love" on YouTube

"Stupid Love" is a song by American recording artist Jason Derulo, released as the fifth overall international single from his third studio album Tattoos (2013). The song was written by Derulo, RedOne, Novel Jannusi, Aleena Gibson, Molly Sandén, Rush and Jordan Sapp while the song's production was handled by RedOne, Rush and BeatGeek.

The single was made available in the UK on March 24, 2014. It was not released as a single in the US, but was included on the US version of the album, Talk Dirty.

== Background, composition and production ==
Following the release of "Trumpets" as the fourth single from Tattoos in most international markets and "Talk Dirty" as the third single for the US market, "Stupid Love" was released as the fifth overall single international single from the album. The song has also been included in the US release of Derulo's third studio album Tattoos, and will most likely see a promotional release in the US as one of the album's next singles.

"Stupid Love" is a mid-tempo R&B ballad that infuses twangy guitar rhythms, with a running duration of three minutes and thirty five seconds. It was written by Jason Desrouleaux, Molly Sandén, RedOne, Novel Jannusi, Aleena Gibson, Rush and Jordan Sapp while the song's production was handled by RedOne, Rush and BeatGeek. Trevor Muzzy handled the song's vocal arrangement, while Derulo produced his own vocals, which were recorded by Trevor Muzzy and Jordan Sapp at Chalice Recording Studios, in Hollywood, California. while also both handling the song's vocal editing. RedOne, Rush and Novel Jannusi provided programming for the song, while Sapp played the guitar. The track was engineered by Trevor Muzzy and Jordan Sapp, and mixed by Muzzy, with assistance from Sapp at Chalice Recording Studios. Molly Sandén serves also as the Background vocalist on the song. It was mastered by Tom Coyne at sterling Sound in New York. "Stupid Love" makes use of an acoustic guitar throughout, with critics noting its resemblance to songs by that of Justin Timberlake and Enrique Iglesias.

In 2019, it came to the Swedish media's attention that Molly Sanden at first didn't get credit or payment for her part in co-writing the song, she only got paid for doing the background vocals. But because she had recorded the entire session on her phone, she had proof that she was a big part in the process and finally got her credits.

== Music video ==
The music video for "Stupid Love" was directed by Gil Green and produced by Judd Allison, with filming taking place on December 20, 2013 in Jason's hometown of Miami, Florida. The music video made its worldwide premiere online through Derulo's official YouTube channel on February 4, 2014. The video depicts Derulo and his wife moving into their new house together. After painting and decorating the empty home, the couple find themselves cuddling and getting into the hot tub together. We then discover that the Derulo dancing around the house is in fact a ghost, after a simple robbery had gone wrong as Derulo and his wife had arrived home earlier than the thieves expected, Derulo was shot twice in the heart while trying to protect his wife and had died at the scene. The video ends with his wife visiting their empty house one last time only to leave with his guitar.

== Live performances ==
Derulo performed the song for the first time live during his Tattoos World Tour.

== Release and artwork ==
The single's release was first officially announced in early December 2013 during the time of the production of the music video. The single would be officially released to the United Kingdom on March 24, while the single has already been released to Australian radio in early March 2014. On March 3, 2014, it was added to the playlist of British urban contemporary station BBC Radio 1Xtra. The track was also added to the New Zealand top ten mainstream playlist on February 28, 2014. As well as the Australian urban stations on February 20, 2014. The artwork for the single features a CGI red heart with a knife piercing through the center of it against a blue tinted background with the song's title plastered across the heart on a yellow ribbon.

== Chart performance ==
"Stupid Love" first appeared on the ARIA Singles Chart in Australia issue dated March 10, 2014, debuting at number thirty nine. In that same week the song also debuted on the Australian urban singles chart at number eight. In its second week on the chart the song jumped twenty-two spots to number seventeen on the singles chart, and jumped six spots to number two on the urban charts. It reached its peak position of number seventeen in its second week on the chart, and number one on the urban singles charts in its third week. In its fourth week on the chart, "Stupid Love" broke into the top 100 on the UK Singles Chart up fifty-one spots from number 143 to ninety-two, issue dated March 8, 2014. It has since reached its peak position of number fifty four in its eighth week on the chart. The song moved up two spots from number forty-one to number thirty-nine in its fourth week on the UK R&B Singles Chart. It has since reached its peak position of number nine in its eighth week on the chart. It has since also peaked at number five in Bulgaria and at number ninety five in Ireland.

== Credits and personnel ==
Credits adapted from the liner notes for Tattoos.

- Lead vocals – Jason Derulo
- Composers – Jason Desrouleaux, RedOne, Novel Jannusi, Aleena Gibson, Molly Sandén, Rush and Jordan Sapp
- Producer – RedOne, Rush and BeatGeek
- Background vocals – Molly Sandén
- Vocal production – Jason Derulo
- Vocal arrangement – Trevor Muzzy
- Recording and engineering – Trevor Muzzy and Jordan Sapp at Chalice Recording Studios, Hollywood, CA
- Vocal editing Trevor Muzzy and Jordan Sapp
- Mixed – Trevor Muzzy
- Mix assistance – Jordan Sapp
- Mastering – Tom Coyne at Sterling Sound in New York.
- Guitars – Jordan Sapp
- Programming – RedOne, Rush and Novel Jannusi

== Charts ==
Chart (2014)	Peak position
Australia (ARIA)	17
Australia Urban (ARIA)	1
Bulgaria (IFPI)	5
Ireland (IRMA)	95
Lebanon (Lebanese Top 20)	4
Romania (Romanian Top 100)	6
UK Singles (OCC)	54
UK Hip Hop/R&B (OCC)	9

== Certifications ==
Region	Certification	Certified units/sales
Australia (ARIA)	Platinum	70,000^{‡}
^{‡} Sales+streaming figures based on certification alone.

== Release history ==
Region	Date	Format	Label
United Kingdom	March 24, 2014	Top 40	Warner Music Group; Beluga Heights
United Kingdom	March 3, 2014	Urban contemporary	Warner Music Group; Beluga Heights
Australia	February 20, 2014	Top 40 radio	Warner Music Group; Beluga Heights
New Zealand	February 28, 2014	Top 40 radio	Warner Music Group; Beluga Heights
