= Bubblegum (Jason Derulo song) =

Song by Jason Derulo featuring Tyga

from the album Tattoos and Talk Dirty
- Released: August 3, 2014
- Recorded: 2013
- Genre: Trap; dirty rap
- Length: 3:26
- Label: Warner Bros.; Beluga Heights
- Songwriters: Jason Desrouleaux; Michael Stevenson; Tim Mosely; Jim Washington
- Producers: Timbaland; Jim Beanz

"Bubblegum" is a song by American singer and songwriter Jason Derulo, from his fourth studio album, Tattoos (2014). The song features American rapper Tyga.

== Music video ==
On August 27, 2014 Derulo uploaded the song's lyric video on his YouTube account.

== Charts ==
Chart (2014)	Peak position
Australia (ARIA)	38
Belgium (Ultratop 50 Wallonia)	6
Belgium Airplay (Ultratop Wallonia)	44
