= Platinum Hits (disambiguation) =

Platinum Hits are select Xbox games that have sold over 400,000 units in the nine months after release.

Platinum Hits may also refer to:

- Platinum Hits (Jason Derulo album), 2016
- Platinum Hits, a 2003 album by Ariel Rivera
- Platinum Hits, a 2001 album by Candyman

== See also ==
- Platinum Hit, a Bravo music competition show for singer-songwriters
