= Wiggle (song) =

2014 song by Jason Derulo featuring Snoop Dogg

Single by Jason Derulo featuring Snoop Dogg

from the album Tattoos and Talk Dirty
- Released: May 6, 2014
- Genre: Dance-pop; pop-rap
- Length: 3:13
- Label: Warner Bros.; Beluga Heights
- Songwriters: Jason Desrouleaux; Eric Frederic; Axident; Jacob Kasher Hindlin; Sean Douglas; John Ryan; Joe Spargur; Calvin Broadus
- Producers: Ricky Reed; Axident; Honua Music; John Ryan; Joe London

Jason Derulo singles chronology
"Stupid Love" (2014)	"Wiggle" (2014)	"Bubblegum" (2014)

Snoop Dogg singles chronology
"Dynamite" (2014)	"Wiggle" (2014)	"Hangover" (2014)

Music video
- "Wiggle" on YouTube

"Wiggle" is a song by American singer Jason Derulo featuring American rapper Snoop Dogg, released as the fourth single from the former's third U.S. studio album, Talk Dirty (2014) in North America. In Europe, the song was released as the sixth single from his third international album, Tattoos and the first single from the special edition of the album.

== Background and composition ==
"Wiggle" was written by Jason Derulo in collaboration with Eric Frederic, Axident, Jacob Kasher, Sean Douglas, John Ryan, Joe Spargur, and Snoop Dogg. Production for the song was handled by Ricky Reed, Honua Music and Axident. The former previously produced Derulo's worldwide hit single, "Talk Dirty". It was recorded at Serenity West Recording in Los Angeles, Tha Compound in Los Angeles and at Start From Infinity "Joshua Tree Sessions" and mixed by Manny Marroquin.

Producers Ricky Reed, Honua Music and Axident used toy flutes, hand clappers, peanut wrappers, and percussive instruments as sound effects.

Jason Derulo chose to collaborate with Snoop Dogg because he "is the coolest, most swagged-out rapper there is. He's iconic, and I wanted to go for a more iconic look for this one." Derulo approached him while they were at an All-Star game. Once he heard the song, Snoop Dogg sent Derulo a message saying: "This is crazy. I'll get back to you in 48 hours". "That's exactly what happened", Derulo explained.

MTV News' Christina Garibaldi described "Wiggle" as an "upbeat club-ready song that's all about a woman's 'big fat butt.'"

== Music video ==
A music video for the song was released on YouTube on May 21, 2014, which has received over 1 billion views. It was directed by Colin Tilley and features a cameo appearance from R&B singer Ne-Yo.

== Critical reception ==
"Wiggle" received mixed-to-negative reviews from music critics. The song was on Spin's list of "The 101 Best Songs of 2014". In a negative review, "Wiggle" was named one of the 10 worst songs of 2014 by Time.

== Live performances ==
On July 4, 2014, Derulo performed "Wiggle" on Good Morning America as part of its Summer Concert Series. On August 10, 2014, Derulo performed the song at the 2014 Teen Choice Awards. Variety described the song as a highlight of the ceremony.

== Commercial performance ==
The song peaked at number 5 on the Billboard Hot 100, making it Derulo's fifth and Snoop Dogg's fourteenth top 10 single on the chart. The song was certified 3× Platinum by the RIAA in June 2019, designating sales of over 3 million in the United States.

== Track listing ==
- German CD single
1. "Wiggle"
2. "Wiggle" (instrumental)
- Digital download — remix
1. "Wiggle" (TWRK remix) – 3:52

== Charts ==
=== Weekly charts ===
Chart (2014)	Peak position
Australia (ARIA)	3
Austria (Ö3 Austria Top 40)	4
Belgium (Ultratop 50 Flanders)	2
Belgium Urban (Ultratop Flanders)	1
Belgium (Ultratop 50 Wallonia)	6
Brazil (Billboard Brasil Hot 100)	29
Canada Hot 100 (Billboard)	14
CIS Airplay (TopHit)	6
Czech Republic Airplay (ČNS IFPI)	21
Czech Republic Singles Digital (ČNS IFPI)	2
Denmark (Tracklisten)	7
Dominican Republic (Monitor Latino)	20
Finland (Suomen virallinen lista)	12
France (SNEP)	4
France Airplay (SNEP)	2
Germany (GfK)	6
Hungary (Dance Top 40)	8
Hungary (Single Top 40)	6
Ireland (IRMA)	9
Lebanon (Lebanese Top 20)	5
Luxembourg Digital Song Sales (Billboard)	3
Netherlands (Dutch Top 40)	12
Italy (FIMI)	36
Netherlands (Single Top 100)	8
New Zealand (Recorded Music NZ)	9
Norway (VG-lista)	4
Romania (Airplay 100)	1
Romania TV Airplay (Media Forest)	1
Russia Airplay (TopHit)	3
Scottish Singles Sales (Official Charts)	10
Slovakia Airplay (ČNS IFPI)	60
Slovakia Singles Digital (ČNS IFPI)	3
South Africa Airplay (EMA)	4
Spain (Promusicae)	12
Sweden (Sverigetopplistan)	5
Switzerland (Schweizer Hitparade)	8
UK Singles (Official Charts)	8
UK Hip Hop/R&B (Official Charts)	1
Ukraine Airplay (TopHit)	15
US Billboard Hot 100	5
US Hot R&B/Hip-Hop Songs (Billboard)	2
US Dance Airplay (Billboard)	18
US Pop Airplay (Billboard)	10
US Rhythmic Airplay (Billboard)	3

=== Year-end charts ===
Chart (2014)	Position
Australia (ARIA)	57
Austria (Ö3 Austria Top 40)	32
Belgium (Ultratop Flanders)	22
Belgium Urban (Ultratop)	3
Belgium (Ultratop Wallonia)	33
Canada (Canadian Hot 100)	67
France (SNEP)	29
Germany (Official German Charts)	34
Hungary (Dance Top 40)	33
Hungary (Single Top 40)	42
Italy (FIMI)	92
Netherlands (Dutch Top 40)	51
Netherlands (Single Top 100)	37
Romania (Airplay 100)	21
Russia Airplay (TopHit)	47
Sweden (Sverigetopplistan)	56
Switzerland (Schweizer Hitparade)	41
UK Singles (Official Charts Company)	48
US Billboard Hot 100	40
US Hot R&B/Hip-Hop Songs (Billboard)	8
US Rhythmic (Billboard)	31

Chart (2015)	Position
Hungary (Dance Top 40)	67

== Certifications ==
Certifications for "Wiggle"
Region	Certification	Certified units/sales
Australia (ARIA)	3× Platinum	210,000^{‡}
Austria (IFPI Austria)	Gold	15,000^{*}
Belgium (BRMA)	Gold	15,000^{*}
Canada (Music Canada)	2× Platinum	160,000^{*}
Germany (BVMI)	Gold	150,000^{‡}
Italy (FIMI)	Platinum	30,000^{‡}
New Zealand (RMNZ)	Platinum	15,000^{*}
Spain (Promusicae)	Platinum	40,000^{‡}
Switzerland (IFPI Switzerland)	Gold	15,000^{^}
United Kingdom (BPI)	Platinum	600,000^{‡}
United States (RIAA)	3× Platinum	3,000,000^{‡}
Streaming
Denmark (IFPI Danmark)	2× Platinum	5,200,000^{†}
Spain (Promusicae)	Platinum	8,000,000^{†}
^{*} Sales figures based on certification alone.^{^} Shipments figures based on certification alone.^{‡} Sales+streaming figures based on certification alone.^{†} Streaming-only figures based on certification alone.

== Release history ==
Region	Date	Format	Label
Italy	May 30, 2014	Contemporary hit radio	Warner Bros.; Beluga Heights
United States	May 6, 2014	Contemporary hit radio	Warner Bros.; Beluga Heights
United States	May 6, 2014	Rhythmic contemporary	Warner Bros.; Beluga Heights
Germany	June 13, 2014	Compact disc	Warner Bros.; Beluga Heights

== See also ==
- List of number-one R&B/hip-hop songs of 2014 (U.S.)
- List of UK R&B Chart number-one singles of 2014
- List of Airplay 100 number ones of the 2010s
