= Talk Dirty (album) =

Studio album (reissue) by Jason Derulo
- Released: April 15, 2014
- Recorded: 2012–2014
- Genres: Pop; hip hop; R&B
- Length: 37:54
- Labels: Warner Bros.; Beluga Heights; UpFront
- Producers: Ammo; Chloe Angelides; Jon Bellion; The Cataracs; Cirkut; DJ Mustard; Jim Beanz; Jonas Jeberg; Martin Johnson; Jared Lee; RedOne; Ricky Reed; Sam Sumser; Timbaland

Jason Derulo chronology
Tattoos (2013)	Talk Dirty (2014)	Everything Is 4 (2015)

Jason Derulo EP chronology
Tattoos (2013)	Talk Dirty (2014)	2Sides (Side 1) (2019)

Singles from Talk Dirty
- 1. "The Other Side" Released: April 3, 2013; 2. "Marry Me" Released: August 26, 2013; 3. "Talk Dirty" Released: January 7, 2014; 4. "Wiggle" Released: May 6, 2014; 5. "Trumpets" Released: August 19, 2014

Talk Dirty is the reissue of American singer Jason Derulo's third studio album, Tattoos (2013). The collection was released solely in the United States, after Tattoos was only released as a 5-track EP in the country. Released seven months after the original, the full-length album features seven songs from the international album as well as four newly recorded songs and was released by Warner Bros. Records on April 15, 2014. For the new material, Derulo worked with past collaborator Ricky Reed, as well as Jim Beanz, Timbaland, Sam Sumser, Chloe Angelides, Cirkut and DJ Mustard. New songs incorporate the same elements of hip hop, pop and R&B and styles previously seen in the original album. Talk Dirty features new collaborations with rappers Kid Ink, Snoop Dogg and Tyga.

A new single "Wiggle" featuring American rapper Snoop Dogg was released as the fourth from the re-issue. The single's accompanying music video was shot on April 14, 2014 with director Colin Tilley. Talk Dirty has been promoted during the Tattoos World Tour, as well as live performances on The Ellen DeGeneres Show, Dancing With the Stars and the 2014 Billboard Music Awards. A Target-exclusive edition of the album featuring 2 bonus tracks from Tattoos, was released simultaneously alongside the eleven-track standard edition, while internationally, all of the newly recorded material was included on the Special edition of Tattoos.

Upon its release, Talk Dirty received generally mixed reviews from music critics, with many criticizing the overtly sexual themes and lyrics throughout the album, while others praised his vocal growth in some songs. Talk Dirty officially debuted at number four on the US Billboard 200 albums chart with 44,000 copies sold in its first week, 10,000 more than predicted, becoming Derulo's first top-five album and highest-charting album in the US to date, beating his debut studio album Jason Derulo by 1,000 copies.

== Background and composition ==
In September 2013, Derulo released his third studio album Tattoos. While recording the record in 2012 and 2013, he collaborated with producers including Ricky Reed and The Cataracs. Following its release, Tattoos became a commercial success; it debuted in the top five on the UK Albums Chart, and the Australian ARIA top 40 albums chart. and charted in the top twenty in several international territories. The project was met with generally mixed reviews from music critics, receiving an average score of 49, based on 4 reviews on Metacritic, indicating "generally mixed or average reviews". Its singles "The Other Side", "Talk Dirty", "Marry Me" and "Trumpets" each had reached the top ten on the Australian ARIA top 40 singles chart and have each been certified multi-platinum in that country.

The new songs on the album include new collaboration with rappers Kid Ink, Snoop Dogg and Tyga while the album's production was handled by Timbaland, The Cataracs, Ammo, Jon Bellion, DJ Mustard, Martin Johnson, RedOne, and Wallpaper. The album will be preceded by the release of the lead single "Wiggle" featuring American hip hop recording artist Snoop Dogg. Derulo released the album's official track list on March 22, 2014. When speaking on the reworked US version of the album, Derulo states:

"A lot of the album is fun, a lot of it is upbeat, feel-good music, but there is an emotional portion to the album too; it morphs in a lot of different ways," he explained. "You heard the first portion of the album on songs like 'The Other Side' and 'Marry Me,' but then it switches to the other side with 'Talk Dirty.' It represents everything I've got, everything I was feeling in the moment. I love going into the studio and just letting it rip."

== New material ==
Derulo commented on On Air with Ryan Seacrest that "This album has a lot of dimensions, 'The Other Side' and 'Marry Me' was one side. But when I was making this album, I wasn't thinking about making hit songs... it was just about getting myself out of the darkness. It came from an honest place, I feel like it's me" Much of the new material incorporates hip hop and R&B styles unlike previously seen in Derulo's earlier albums. Four new songs were recorded for Talk Dirty: "Wiggle" (with Snoop Dogg), "Zipper", "Bubblegum" (with Tyga) and "Kama Sutra" (with Kid Ink). The newly recorded material for the reissue follow the "provocative nature and upbeat sound of the aforementioned" title track Talk Dirty. "Wiggle" is an "upbeat club-ready" hip-hop infused R&B song that's all about a woman's "big fat butt". Compared to the "matching the slinky nature" of the album's title track, the song features guest vocals from Snoop Dogg. Ricky Reed aka Wallpaper. produced "Wiggle", while also handling the song's music and programming with assistance from Axident, Joe London and John Ryan. The song was recorded by Alex Granelli at Serenity West Recording in Los Angeles, Tha Compound in Los Angeles and at Start From Infinity "Joshua Tree Sessions". It was mixed by Manny Marroquin with additional engineering provided by Ricky Reed, Axident, John Ryan, Joe Spargur and Alex Granelli. It was mastered by Chris Gehringer at Sterling Sound in New York City. Speaking to NewNowNext, Derulo described it as "a song that you can't help but move to. If the person next to you is not moving, don't trust that person—that is not a good person".

"Bubblegum" is an uptempo R&B song that features guest vocals from Tyga is an "ode to the ghetto booties". Once again reminiscent of Talk Dirty, the "contagious and energetic" song sees the inclusion of "sexed-up" lyrical content. It was written by Derulo, Michael Stevenson, Tim Mosley and James Washington, while the song's production was handled by Jim Beanz and Timbaland. The song was recorded and mixed by Demacio “Demo” Castellon & Mike Turco at The Hit Factory Criteria in Miami, while Tyga's vocals were recorded and mixed by Jess Jackson at Ameraycan Studios. Additional engineering was provided by Vadim Chislov and Perry Jimenez. "Kama Sutra" is a mid tempo R&B song that features Kid Ink. It was written by Derulo, Brian Todd Collins, Yung Berg, Breyan Issac and DJ Mustard who also produced the song. The song was recorded by James Royo at Encore Recording Studios in Burbank with additional recording by Alex Granelli at Serenity Studios in Hollywood. It was mixed by James Royo with assistance from Victor Luevanos. "Zipper" is a mid tempo R&B song and is the only new song that does not contain a featuring vocalist. It was written by Derulo, Henry Walter, Sam Sumser, Chloe Angelides, Lukasz Gottwald and Kasher. The song was produced by Cirkut, Sam Sumser and Chloe Angelides and recorded at Luke's in the Boo in Malibu, Red Jacket Studios in Fairfax and Jazzanova Recording Studio in Berlin. It was mixed by Serban Ghenea at Mixstar Studios in Virginia Beach, Virginia. Additional engineering was provided by Axel Reinemer, Clint Gibbs and Sean Small with assistance from Rachael Findlen.

== Release ==
Derulo was originally set to release the full-length album of Tattoos both in the United States and Internationally on September 24, 2013, however after a last-minute shift in strategy between Derulo and his label. "Tattoos" was released as a five track EP including the first three singles plus two extra songs, with the full-length album to follow shortly after the release of a third US single. Derulo had confirmed that he was working on new material to be released specifically for the U.S. version of the album. Explaining the last-minute shift in strategy, Derulo said, "I know the fans they wanted something here and I wanted to give the fans at least something other than just the single. So I'm doing the EP and then the album will come out shortly after that." After topping the charts in over five international territories "Talk Dirty" was officially released in the United States on January 7, 2014 as the third single from the Tattoos EP. Derulo officially announced the reissue of Tattoos, retitled Talk Dirty, in February 2014. He added that the album would include all of the singles released from the international album including "Marry Me", "Talk Dirty", "Stupid Love", "Trumpets" and The Other Side as well as the duet with his ex-girlfriend Jordin Sparks on "Vertigo" and four additional newly recorded songs.

== Artwork ==
On March 17, 2014, just under a month away from its US release, Derulo revealed the US version of the album cover. The shoot took place with fashion photographer James Dimmock on February 7, 2014. Photos from the shoot and a series of promotional/press photos were released on February 18, 2014. The shoot included various shirtless scenes including Derulo sitting on a windowsill. The cover art features Derulo stripped down shirtless on the "provocative cover" art, as a woman puts her hands all over his torso, much like the single cover used for "Talk Dirty".

== Promotion ==
Derulo began promoting the US version of the album with live performances and appearances on televised shows, including Jimmy Kimmel Live! on January 23, 2014, on BET's 106 & Park on January 30, 2014, and on The Arsenio Hall Show on February 6, 2014, in preparation for the album's US release On March 17, 2014 Derulo opened for the 18th season premiere of the competitive reality show, Dancing With the Stars where he performed "Talk Dirty". It was the first-time in the show's 9-year run where they opened with a musical performance accompanied by their acclaimed professional dancers. As part of promotion for the album, fans who use the Shazam app for the performance were automatically entered in a contest to win a trip to Las Vegas for the album release party on April 19, 2014. Following his performance on DWTS, Derulo released the official album cover art for "Talk Dirty", while the album was also made available for digital pre-order the same day. Derulo also performed on the 3rd season of The Voice final live results show, which aired on April 5, 2014. Derulo held a private album listening party on April 7, 2014, at 1Oak Los Angeles hosted by OK! Magazine. During the album's release week Derulo further promoted the album with a live stream of the iHeartRadio album release party on April 15, 2014. Other performances included The Ellen DeGeneres Show, 106 & Park, Late Night with Seth Meyers and a free concert and CD signing at Universal CityWalk in Hollywood alongside Jake Miller on April 16, 2014. Derulo is also set to perform at the 2014 Billboard Music Awards. Derulo will also perform at 2014 Billboard Music Awards.

=== Celebrities Talkin' Dirty ===
In November 2013, One Direction unveiled a viral video of themselves dancing along to Derulo's "Talk Dirty" as part of 1D Day, a seven-hour YouTube live stream with the members of One Direction. The video quickly went viral, with 1D fans making their own YouTube clips dancing to "Talk Dirty". Following that the song quickly spiked 630% in sales, from 78,000 on Nov. 23 to 612,000 on Nov. 24, and has continued to grow. U.S. sales, Derulo capitalized on the sensation, and began enlisting other celebrities to appear in a forthcoming 1D-inspired "Celebrities Talkin' Dirty" music video. Derulo released the official lip-sync video for the song on March 14, 2014 to his official YouTube account, which included cameos by Robin Thicke, will.i.am, Jordin Sparks, Ariana Grande, Fifth Harmony, Bow Wow, One Direction, Flo Rida, Austin Mahone, Ryan Seacrest, Enrique Iglesias, Larry King and more.

== Singles ==
With "The Other Side", "Marry Me, and "Talk Dirty" being released as official singles in order, "Wiggle" featuring hip hop artist Snoop Dogg was released as the album's fourth single. Derulo commented on the single's release stating "I probably shouldn't tell you, but, my next single is called 'Wiggle', and it features Snoop, and, man, it's one of the most fun records you've ever heard in your life," he said. "It's the most excited I've been about a song I wrote in my entire career." Derulo performed the song for the first time live at the "Valentine's Crush" concert in February 2014. Derulo has performed the song several times during his Tattoos World Tour as an encore song on his set list alongside "Trumpets". The single's accompanying music video was shot on April 14, 2014 with director Colin Tilley. It was sent to US Top 40 radio on May 6, 2014. On August 21, 2014, "Trumpets" was sent to US radio as the fifth and final single from the album.

== Critical reception ==
Professional ratings
Review scores
Source	Rating
AllMusic	3/5 stars
Cuepoint (Expert Witness)	A
Music Connection	5/10
Newsday	C
People	2.5/4 stars
Us Weekly	3/4 stars
USA Today	2/4 stars

Upon its release, Talk Dirty received generally mixed reviews from music critics. At USA Today, Martin Caballero rated the album two out of four stars, stating that Derulo is "wallow[ing] in familiar sexed-up tropes, both lyrically and musically, that aren't distinctive enough to ultimately prove memorable." Caballero continued saying "Talk Dirty sounds like Macklemore's Thrift Shop on Red Bull and Viagra". Brent Faulkner of StarPulse.com rated the album three out of five stars, stating that the album heavily relies on sex and swagger holds the album back at times. Faulkner went on to summarize the album as "average at best" stating "[Talk Dirty] seems to put its eggs too much into one basket – specifically booty. Much like Derülo's Future History, Talk Dirty seems to lack cohesion; it's missing something". Glenn Gamboa at Newsday graded the album a C, saying that Derulo "tries too hard at the wrong things... cornering the market on sex-themed pop songs." in closing Gambo called Talk Dirty a "sex-obsessed album that isn't very sexy".

On the other hand, Robert Christgau was more enthusiastic in his column for Billboard, impressed by Derulo's "command of contemporary hookcraft", even though the songs were about sex gratifying enough to prompt marriage: "I value both sex and matrimony too much to recommend this life strategy. But compared to the predatory Chris Brown of 'Loyal' or the chauvinistic Trey Songz of 'Foreign', he's so exuberant and playful he helps me get why guys and dolls fall for it—even share their thrills some, vicariously." David Jeffries of AllMusic said that the album appears to be "some post-traumatic stress therapy session mixed with a banging, ultra after-party." Jeffries praised the album's repacking and total repurposing of Tattoos commending the new production on the album stating "[Wiggle] gives the album a stripclub number in Ying Yang Twins style where everyone sounds like they're having the proper amount of fun". Christgau named it the sixth best album of 2014 in his year-end list for The Barnes & Noble Review.

== Commercial performance ==
On April 17, 2014 Hits Daily Double reported that "Talk Dirty" would most likely sell between 30–35,000 copies in its first week in the United States by the end of April 23, 2014. Talk Dirty debuted at number four on the US Billboard 200 albums chart with 44,000 copies sold in its first week, 10,000 more than predicted, becoming Derulo's first top five album and highest charting album in the US to date, beating his debut album Jason Derulo by 1,000 copies

In its second week the album dropped thirteen places to number seventeen selling an additional 12,000 copies. In its third week it sold 8,000 more copies, bringing its total to 65,000. In its fourth week the album sold 8,000 more copies bringing its total to 73,000. In its fifth week the album sold 8,000 more copies bringing its total to 81,000. As of July 23, 2014, the album has sold 154,000 copies. On December 31, 2014, the album hit the 45th spot on the chart selling an additional 25,000 copies, including streams, bringing the total to 179,000 copies sold in the United States. The album has sold 245,000 copies in the US as of May 2015.

== Track listing ==
=== LP versions ===
No.	Title	Writer(s)	Producer(s)	Length
1.	"Talk Dirty" (featuring 2 Chainz)	Jason Desrouleaux; Tauheed Epps; Eric Frederic; Jason Evigan; Sean Douglas; Ori Kaplan; Tamir Muskat; Tomer Yosef	Ricky Reed	2:57
2.	"Wiggle" (featuring Snoop Dogg)	Desrouleaux; Andreas Schuller; Frederic; John Ryan; Jacob Kasher; Sean Douglas; Joseph Spargur; Calvin Broadus	Axident; Reed; John Ryan^{[a]}; Joe London^{[a]}	3:13
3.	"Trumpets"	Desrouleaux; Jon Bellion	Bellion	3:37
4.	"Bubblegum" (featuring Tyga)	Desrouleaux; Michael Nguyen-Stevenson; Tim Mosley; James Washington	Jim Beanz; Timbaland^{[a]}	3:25
5.	"Vertigo" (featuring Jordin Sparks)	Desrouleaux; Jared Lee; Matt White	Lee	3:53
6.	"Kama Sutra" (featuring Kid Ink)	Desrouleaux; Brian Todd Collins; Dijon McFarlane; Christian Ward; Breyan Issac	DJ Mustard	3:36
7.	"Zipper"	Desrouleaux; Henry Walter; Sam Sumser; Chloe Angelides; Lukasz Gottwald; Kasher	Cirkut; Sumser; Angelides	2:57
8.	"The Other Side"	Desrouleaux; Martin Johnson; Joshua Coleman	Ammo; Johnson	3:46
9.	"With the Lights On"	Desrouleaux; Niles Hollowell-Dhar; Marty James; Andrew Harr; Jermaine Jackson; Andre Davidson; Sean Davidson	The Cataracs	3:11
10.	"Stupid Love"	Desrouleaux; RedOne; Novel Jannusi; Aleena Gibson; Jordan Sapp	RedOne; Rush; BeatGeek	3:34
11.	"Marry Me"	Desrouleaux; Jonas Jeberg; Marlin "Hookman" Bonds; Andy Marvel	Jeberg	3:45
Total length:				37:54

Target exclusive bonus tracks
No.	Title	Writer(s)	Producer(s)	Length
12.	"Tattoo"	Desrouleaux; James "J. Hart" Abrahart; Justin Franks; Vinay Vyas; Justin Davey; Oh, Hush!	DJ Frank E; TODAY	3:26
13.	"Fire" (featuring Pitbull)	Desrouleaux; Urales Vargas; Armando C. Perez; Matthew Naples; Tierce Alec-John Person; Abrahart	DJ Buddha; DJ Noodles; Tearce "Kizzo"	3:36
Total length:				44:56

=== EP version ===
France extended play
No.	Title	Writer(s)	Producer(s)	Length
1.	"Talk Dirty" (featuring 2 Chainz)	Desrouleaux; Epps; Frederic; Evigan; Douglas; Kaplan; Muskat; Yosef	Ricky Reed	2:57
2.	"Marry Me"	Desrouleaux; Jeberg; Bonds; Marvel	Jeberg	3:45
3.	"Trumpets" (featuring Maude)	Desrouleaux; Bellion	Bellion	3:05
4.	"Wiggle" (featuring Snoop Dogg)	Desrouleaux; Broadus; Frederic; Axident; Douglas; Kasher; Ryan; Spargur	Axident; Reed; John Ryan^{[a]}; Joe London^{[a]}	3:13
5.	"Bubblegum" (featuring Tyga)	Desrouleaux; Stevenson; Mosley; Washington	Beanz; Timbaland^{[a]}	3:25
Total length:				16:25

Notes

- ^{^[a]} signifies a co-producer

Sample credits

- "Talk Dirty" contains a sample from "Hermetico", written by Ori Kaplan, Tamir Muskat, and Tomer Yosef, as performed by Balkan Beat Box.
- ^{^[a]} signifies a co-producer

== Personnel ==
Adapted from Talk Dirty album booklet.

Creativity and management

- Frank Harris – executive producer
- Jason Derulo – executive producer
- Frank Maddocks – art direction
- Donny Phillips – art direction
- Gabriel Encinas – back cover photo
- James Dimmock – cover photo
- Denise Watts – creative director
- Norman Wonderly – creative director
- Alex Tenta – package design
- Ben Watts – photography

Vocal credits

- Jason Derulo – lead vocals, background vocals
- 2 Chainz – featured artist
- Jordin Sparks – featured artist
- Jared Lee – background vocals
- Kid Ink – featured artist
- Snoop Dogg – featured artist
- Tyga – featured artist
- Molly Sandén – background vocals
- Martin Johnson – background vocals
- Joshua "Ammo" Coleman – background vocals

Technical

- Jason Derulo – additional production, primary artist, vocal producer
- Jared Lee – bass programming, keyboards, producer
- Jordan Sapp – engineer, guitar, mixing assistant, vocal editing
- Rachael Findlen – assistant engineer
- Perry Jimenez – assistant engineer
- Delbert Bowers – assistant
- Dave Cohen – assistant
- Chris Galland – assistant
- Meg Margossian – assistant
- Phil Seaford – assistant
- Jonas Jeberg – engineer, instrumentation, producer, programming, vocal producer
- The Runners – additional production
- The Monarch – additional production
- Andre Harr – composer
- Jermaine Jackson – composer
- Sean Davidson – composer
- Andre Davidson – composer
- Kyle Moorman – additional production, engineer, programming
- Vadim Chislov – assistant engineer
- Niles Hollowell-Dhar – engineer
- Martin Johnson – acoustic guitar, electric guitar, percussion, piano, producer, programming, vocal producer
- John Ryan – guitar
- Chloe Angelides – instrumentation, producer, programming, vocals
- RedOne – instrumentation, producer, programming
- Jon Bellion – producer
- DJ Mustard – producer
- Demacio "Demo" Castellon – engineer, mixing
- Jim Bottari – engineer, vocal engineer
- Michael Turco – mixing
- Roberto "Tito" Vazquez – mixing
- Joe Zook – mixing
- Jim Beanz – producer
- Beatgeek – producer
- The Cataracs – producer
- Benny Steele – engineer, vocal engineer
- Juan Negrete – engineer, vocal engineer
- Josh Collins – engineer
- Clint Gibbs – engineer
- Alex Granelli – engineer
- John Hanes – engineer
- Drew Kapner – engineer
- Rush – instrumentation, producer, programming
- Sam Sumser – instrumentation, producer, programming
- Novel Jannusi – instrumentation, programming
- Timothy "Timbaland" Mosley – producer
- Joshua "Ammo" Coleman – drums, keyboards, producer, programming
- Ricky Reed – engineer, instrumentation, producer, programming
- Trevor Muzzy – engineer, mixing, vocal arrangement, vocal editing
- Jess Jackson – engineer, mixing, vocal producer
- Joe Peluso – engineer
- Axel Reinemer – engineer
- Jonathan Sher – engineer
- Sean Small – engineer
- Vince Watson – engineer
- Jordin Sparks – vocal producer
- Cirkut – instrumentation, producer, programming
- Rie Abe – introduction
- Tom Coyne – mastering
- Chris Gehringer – mastering
- Ryan Lipman – mixing assistant
- Victor Luevanos – mixing assistant
- Kyle McAulay – mixing assistant
- James Royo – mixing, vocal engineer
- Finis "KY" White – mixing, vocal engineer
- Serban Ghenea – mixing
- Mike Daddy Evans – production consultant
- Irene Richter – production coordination
- Adam Catania – recording assistant
- Nico Hartikainen – vocal engineer
- Erik Madrid – mixing
- Manny Marroquin – mixing
- Sam Sumser – producer
- Wallpaper – producer
- Shon Lawon – vocal engineer
- John Shullman – vocal engineer
- Sergio "Sergical" Tsai – vocals

== Charts ==
=== Weekly charts ===
Chart (2014)	Peak position
French Albums (SNEP)	199
US Billboard 200	4

=== Year-end charts ===
Chart (2014)	Position
US Billboard 200	92
Chart (2015)	Position
US Billboard 200	149

== Certifications ==
Region	Certification	Certified units/sales
United States (RIAA)	Platinum	1,000,000^{‡}
^{‡} Sales+streaming figures based on certification alone.

== Release history ==
Region	Date	Format	Label
United States	April 15, 2014	CD; digital download	Warner Bros. Records
France	April 21, 2014	Extended play	Warner Bros. Records
