= Marry Me (Jason Derulo song) =

Single by Jason Derulo

from the album Tattoos and Talk Dirty
- Released: August 26, 2013
- Recorded: 2012
- Genre: Pop; R&B
- Length: 3:45
- Label: Warner Bros.
- Songwriters: Jason Desrouleaux; Jonas Jeberg; Marlin "Hookman" Bonds; Andy Marvel; Nick Jonas
- Producer: Jonas Jeberg

Jason Derulo singles chronology
"Talk Dirty" (2013)	"Marry Me" (2013)	"Trumpets" (2013)

"Marry Me" is a song by American recording artist Jason Derulo, released as the second single in the US and Canadian markets (third overall) from his third studio album, Tattoos (2013) (US version titled Talk Dirty). The song was written by Jason Derulo, Jonas Jeberg, "Hookman" Marlin Bonds, Andy Marvel while the song's production was handled by Jonas Jeberg. It is the third track on Tattoos and the eleventh and final track on Talk Dirty.

== Background and release ==
During an interview with On Air with Ryan Seacrest, Derulo revealed that he wrote the song as an ode to his then girlfriend, former American Idol winner, singer Jordin Sparks. He also shared his favorite lyric: " '.... 105 is the number that comes to my head when I think of all the years I want to be with you.' It’s one of those things you want to wake up next to that person forever so 105 is the number that I thought of".

== Music video ==
The music video to "Marry Me" was released on Derulo's YouTube account on September 23, 2013. The video also features Jordin Sparks who appears on the video since Derulo dedicated to her. The music video also premiered on BET's 106 & Park the same day. In the video, Derulo can be seen buying a ring, waking up with Sparks, Derulo playing the piano while Sparks lies on top. Then, other scenes include the two of them relaxing in a bathtub, watching a movie, eating and fighting with flour. The older version of Derulo and Sparks at the end were played by Derulo's real-life grandparents.

== Critical reception ==
Entertainment Weekly compared the song to Bruno Mars' "Just the Way You Are", saying that "it touches the same romance level of that song", but in a "cornier" way. Karen Lanza of Popcrush said Derulo "has granted the world its next top wedding tune" and called it an "upbeat love song"

== Release and artwork ==
The artwork for the single features the diamond ring seen in Derulo's computerized neck tattoo on the album cover of Tattoos. The song made its world premiere of the new song on On Air with Ryan Seacrest on Monday August 26, 2013, and was made available for digital download through digital retailers on the day.

== Usage in media ==
The song was featured in the 2014 re-release of the game Grand Theft Auto V on the fictional radio station "Radio Los Santos", despite the station not playing R&B, it was also featured in Comedy Central animated series South Park episode "Basic Cable".

== Track listing ==
- Digital download
1. "Marry Me" – 3:45

== Charts ==
=== Weekly charts ===
Chart (2013–14)	Peak position
Australia (ARIA)	8
Austria (Ö3 Austria Top 40)	27
Belgium (Ultratip Bubbling Under Wallonia)	5
Canada Hot 100 (Billboard)	37
France (SNEP)	50
Germany (GfK)	57
Japan Hot 100 (Billboard)	23
New Zealand (Recorded Music NZ)	14
Switzerland (Schweizer Hitparade)	40
UK Singles (Official Charts)	52
US Billboard Hot 100	26
US Adult Pop Airplay (Billboard)	27
US Pop Airplay (Billboard)	14
US Rhythmic Airplay (Billboard)	21

=== Year-end charts ===
Chart (2013)	Position
Australia (ARIA)	100
Chart (2014)	Position
France (SNEP)	159

== Certifications ==
Region	Certification	Certified units/sales
Australia (ARIA)	3× Platinum	210,000^{‡}
Canada (Music Canada)	Gold	40,000^{*}
New Zealand (RMNZ)	Platinum	30,000^{‡}
Norway (IFPI Norway)	Platinum	10,000^{‡}
United Kingdom (BPI)	Silver	200,000^{‡}
United States (RIAA)	Platinum	1,000,000^{‡}
Streaming
Denmark (IFPI Danmark)	Gold	900,000^{†}
^{*} Sales figures based on certification alone.^{‡} Sales+streaming figures based on certification alone.^{†} Streaming-only figures based on certification alone.

== Credits and personnel ==
- Vocals – Jason Derulo
- Lyrics – Jason Desrouleaux, Jonas Jeberg, "Hookman" Marlin Bonds, Andy Marvel
- Producer – Jonas Jeberg
- Label – Warner Bros. Records Inc.

== Release history ==
Region	Date	Format	Label
Canada	August 26, 2013	Digital download	Warner Music Group
United States	August 26, 2013	Digital download	Warner Music Group
United States	September 10, 2013	Contemporary hit radio	Warner Music Group; Beluga Heights
France	September 23, 2013	Digital download	Warner Music Group
