= Trumpets (Jason Derulo song) =

Single by Jason Derulo

from the album Tattoos and Talk Dirty
- Released: August 19, 2014
- Recorded: 2013
- Studio: Atlantic Studios; (Hollywood, California)
- Genre: Pop; R&B
- Length: 3:37
- Label: Warner Bros.
- Songwriters: Jason Desrouleaux; Jon Bellion
- Producer: Jon Bellion

Jason Derulo singles chronology
"Marry Me" (2013)	"Trumpets" (2013)	"Stupid Love" (2014)

"Trumpets" is a song by American singer Jason Derulo, released as the fourth single in Australia, New Zealand and the European market and third single in the UK, from his third studio album, Tattoos (2013). The song was written by Derulo (under his real name Jason Desrouleaux) and Jon Bellion, who also handled the production.

Although the song wasn't released as a single in the United States at the time, it was included on the US version of the album, Talk Dirty (2014). "Trumpets" was released in the US as the fifth single from Talk Dirty and has since peaked at number 14 on the US Billboard Hot 100. It was sent to US pop and rhythmic radio on August 19, 2014. It was released on August 19, 2014, in the United States.

== Background ==
Following the release of "Marry Me" as the third single from his album Tattoos in the US and some international markets, "Trumpets" was released as the fourth overall single from the album to the UK and European territories. "Trumpets" was written by Jason Desrouleaux and Jon Bellion who also handled the production. The song was recorded by Vince Watson at Atlantic Studios in Hollywood, California. with additional recordings by Josh Collins and Juan P. Negrete. It was mixed by Roberto "Tito" Vazquez at Plush recording Studios in Orlando Florida. It was mastered by Tom Coyne at sterling Sound in New York.

== Composition ==
"Trumpets" is a midtempo pop and R&B song that runs for a duration of three minutes and thirty seven seconds and was written by Jason Derulo and Jon Bellion, who also handled the song's production. Lyrically the song is about being so in love with and infatuated with someone that every time you're together, trumpets blast through your head, as heard in the lyrics "Every time that you get undressed/ I hear symphonies in my head." It also states how various features of Jason's girlfriend remind him of other songs by other artists, including Coldplay (her eyes— possibly a reference to "Green Eyes"), Katy Perry (her bra— possibly a reference to "California Gurls", in the video for which Perry dons a distinctive cream-shooting bra) and Kanye West (her rear— possibly a reference to the 2 Chainz and Kanye West single "Birthday Song", which features many lyrics about "booty").

== Music video ==
On October 11, 2013, the official lyric video for the song premiered on Derulo's official YouTube channel, after which he tweeted '#trumpets #tattoos' with a link to the video, to help promote the song's release. The music video for "Trumpets" made its world premiere online through Derulo's official YouTube channel on November 3, 2013. The video depicts Jason attempting to have sex with a young woman. Just as she takes off her clothes, he is bombarded by the sound of instruments and a marching band bursts into his bedroom.

== Live performances ==
Derulo performed "Trumpets" live for the first time in the UK on BBC Radio 1 1Xtra special performance in the Live Lounge. He also performed the song at the Capital FM Jingle Bell Ball on December 8, 2013, along with his debut single "Whatcha Say", "The Other Side", "In My Head" and "Talk Dirty". Derulo made his first televised performance of the song during a promotional tour in the UK on The Paul O'Grady Show on December 10, 2013. Derulo also performed this track on New Years Day for the Dick Clark post show. On July 4, 2014, Derulo performed it on Good Morning America as part of its Summer Concert Series. He performed the song during the MDA Show of Strength that aired on August 31, 2014, but was taped in May 2014.

== Release and artwork ==
The artwork for the single features several of the same trumpet seen in Derulo's CGI neck tattoo on the album cover of Tattoos. On November 7, the single was first released in the UK. It was added to the playlist of British urban contemporary station BBC Radio 1Xtra. It has since been released to many international territories while "Talk Dirty" was released in the US as the third single.

== Chart performance ==
"Trumpets" first appeared on the Dutch Top 40 in the Netherlands issue dated November 30, 2013, debuting at its current peak position of number 22. In Australia, "Trumpets" debuted at number 22 the ARIA Singles Chart issue dated December 15, 2013: it reached its peak position of number one in its fourth week on the chart. It has also made an appearance on the New Zealand Top 40 Singles Chart, where it debuted at number 31, and has since reached its current peak of number 3.

"Trumpets" made its debut on the UK R&B Singles Chart at number fifteen, it has since reached its peak position of number one in its fifth week on the chart. It reached number 4 on the UK Singles Chart, becoming his third Top 10 single from the album and his eighth overall. "Trumpets" remained at fourth position for four consecutive weeks.

The song reached a peak of No. 14 on the Billboard Hot 100, and has sold over a million copies in the US as of October 2014.

== Track listing ==
- Digital download
1. "Trumpets" – 3:37

== Charts ==
=== Weekly charts ===
Chart (2013–2014)	Peak position
Australia (ARIA)	1
Australia Urban (ARIA)	1
Austria (Ö3 Austria Top 40)	33
Belgium (Ultratop 50 Flanders)	10
Belgium (Ultratop Flanders Urban)	3
Belgium (Ultratop 50 Wallonia)	26
Canada Hot 100 (Billboard)	38
Czech Republic Airplay (ČNS IFPI)	18
Czech Republic Singles Digital (ČNS IFPI)	54
Denmark (Tracklisten)	21
Finland Airplay (Radiosoittolista)	24
France (SNEP)	25
Germany (GfK)	30
Hungary (Editors' Choice Top 40)	38
Hungary (Stream Top 40)	32
Ireland (IRMA)	5
Netherlands (Dutch Top 40)	6
Netherlands (Single Top 100)	11
New Zealand (Recorded Music NZ)	3
Norway (VG-lista)	6
Scottish Singles Sales (Official Charts)	4
Slovakia Airplay (ČNS IFPI)	69
Slovakia Singles Digital (ČNS IFPI)	84
Spain (Promusicae)	14
Sweden (Sverigetopplistan)	25
Switzerland (Schweizer Hitparade)	43
UK Singles (Official Charts)	4
UK Hip Hop/R&B (Official Charts)	1
US Billboard Hot 100	14
US Dance Airplay (Billboard)	25
US Pop Airplay (Billboard)	10
US Rhythmic Airplay (Billboard)	5

=== Year-end charts ===
Chart (2013)	Position
Australia (ARIA)	77
Netherlands (Dutch Top 40)	119
UK Singles (Official Charts Company)	125

Chart (2014)	Position
Australia (ARIA)	37
Belgium (Ultratop Flanders)	50
Belgium Urban (Ultratop)	7
Netherlands (Dutch Top 40)	31
Netherlands (Single Top 100)	88
New Zealand (Recorded Music NZ)	12
Spain (PROMUSICAE)	43
Sweden (Sverigetopplistan)	77
UK Singles (Official Charts Company)	55
US Billboard Hot 100	61

== Certifications ==
Region	Certification	Certified units/sales
Australia (ARIA)	7× Platinum	490,000^{‡}
Canada (Music Canada)	Platinum	80,000^{*}
Germany (BVMI)	Gold	150,000^{‡}
Italy (FIMI)	Gold	15,000^{‡}
New Zealand (RMNZ)	3× Platinum	90,000^{‡}
Norway (IFPI Norway)	Platinum	10,000^{‡}
Spain (Promusicae)	Platinum	40,000^{‡}
Sweden (GLF)	Gold	20,000^{‡}
United Kingdom (BPI)	2× Platinum	1,200,000^{‡}
United States (RIAA)	2× Platinum	2,000,000^{‡}
Streaming
Denmark (IFPI Danmark)	2× Platinum	5,200,000^{†}
Spain (Promusicae)	Platinum	8,000,000^{†}
^{*} Sales figures based on certification alone.^{‡} Sales+streaming figures based on certification alone.^{†} Streaming-only figures based on certification alone.

== Credits and personnel ==
Credits adapted from the liner notes for Tattoos.

- Vocals – Jason Derulo
- Lyrics – Jason Desrouleaux, Jon Bellion
- Producer – Jon Bellion
- Sound recording and reproduction Recorded By – Vince Watson at Atlantic Recording Studios, Hollywood, CA
- Additional Recordings – Josh Collins and Juan P. Negrete
- Mixed by – Roberto "Tito" Vazquez at Plush Recording Studios, Orlando FL
- Mastered by – Tom Coyne at Sterling Sound in New York.
- Label – Warner Bros. Records Inc.

== Release history ==
Region	Date	Format	Label
United Kingdom	November 7, 2013	Urban contemporary	Warner Music Group; Beluga Heights
Australia	December 2, 2013	Top 40 radio	Warner Music Group; Beluga Heights
New Zealand	December 2, 2013	Top 40 radio	Warner Music Group; Beluga Heights
United States	August 21, 2014	Mainstream Top 40	Warner Music Group; Beluga Heights
