= The Other Side (Jason Derulo song) =

2013 song by Jason Derulo

Single by Jason Derulo

from the album Tattoos and Talk Dirty
- Released: April 3, 2013
- Recorded: 2012
- Genre: Dance-pop; EDM
- Length: 3:46
- Label: Warner Bros.; Beluga Heights
- Songwriters: Jason Desrouleaux; Martin Johnson; Joshua Coleman
- Producer: Ammo

Jason Derulo singles chronology
"Pick Up the Pieces" (2012)	"The Other Side" (2013)	"Talk Dirty" (2013)

Audio sample
- file; help

Music video
- "The Other Side" on YouTube

"The Other Side" is a song by American singer Jason Derulo, released as the lead single from his third studio album, Tattoos (2013), and its US counterpart Talk Dirty (2014). Derulo co-wrote the song with Martin Johnson and Joshua "Ammo" Coleman; the latter is also the producer. The song was later featured in a TV spot for the 2017 Disney/Pixar film Coco.

"The Other Side" was met with mixed reviews from critics, some praised its energy and catchiness while others defined it as a generic autotuned dance-pop track.

== Composition ==
Courtney E. Smith of Radio.com wrote that "The Other Side" is about what "men really think about before the first time they have sex with a woman they care about."

"The Other Side" is performed in the key of A major with a tempo of 128 beats per minute, with Derulo's vocals ranging from E_{3} to C♯_{5}.

== Music video ==
The lyric video was uploaded to Jason's YouTube account on April 23, 2013. The official music video was uploaded on May 1 and was directed by Colin Tilley. It features Derulo along with his girlfriend, played by Erika Marosi, in many different locations such as in a bedroom and in a club. It also features Derulo doing a headstand near the end of the video.

Derulo created the acoustic version of this song with Tyler Ward.

== Live performances ==
On August 7, 2013, Derulo performed "The Other Side" on America's Got Talent. He performed the song at the Capital FM Jingle Bell Ball on December 8, 2013. He also performed the song during iHeartRadio Album Release Party in April 2014. On July 4, 2014, Derulo performed it on Good Morning America as part of its Summer Concert Series.

== Track listing ==
Digital download
No.	Title	Length
1.	"The Other Side"	3:47

German CD single
No.	Title	Length
1.	"The Other Side"	3:47
2.	"The Other Side" (Fred Falke remix)	3:50

== Charts ==
=== Weekly charts ===
Chart (2013)	Peak position
Australia (ARIA)	4
Austria (Ö3 Austria Top 40)	30
Belgium (Ultratip Bubbling Under Flanders)	19
Belgium (Ultratip Bubbling Under Wallonia)	20
Canada Hot 100 (Billboard)	5
Czech Republic Airplay (ČNS IFPI)	36
Denmark (Tracklisten)	36
Euro Digital Song Sales (Billboard)	3
France (SNEP)	45
Germany (GfK)	35
Hungary (Rádiós Top 40)	4
Ireland (IRMA)	4
Japan Hot 100 (Billboard)	74
Netherlands (Dutch Top 40)	30
Netherlands (Single Top 100)	52
New Zealand (Recorded Music NZ)	12
Scottish Singles Sales (Official Charts)	2
Slovakia Airplay (ČNS IFPI)	27
South Africa Airplay (EMA)	10
Spain (Promusicae)	50
Sweden (Sverigetopplistan)	49
Switzerland (Schweizer Hitparade)	19
UK Singles (Official Charts)	2
UK Hip Hop/R&B (Official Charts)	1
US Billboard Hot 100	18
US Adult Pop Airplay (Billboard)	22
US Dance Club Songs (Billboard)	35
US Pop Airplay (Billboard)	5
US Rhythmic Airplay (Billboard)	8
Venezuela Pop Rock General (Record Report)	5

=== Year-end charts ===
Chart (2013)	Position
Australia (ARIA)	48
Canada (Canadian Hot 100)	43
France (SNEP)	192
Hungary (Rádiós Top 40)	39
Netherlands (Dutch Top 40)	183
UK Singles (Official Charts Company)	39
US Billboard Hot 100	66
US Mainstream Top 40 (Billboard)	26
US Rhythmic (Billboard)	37

== Certifications ==
Region	Certification	Certified units/sales
Australia (ARIA)	3× Platinum	210,000^{‡}
Canada (Music Canada)	Platinum	80,000^{*}
New Zealand (RMNZ)	Platinum	15,000^{*}
Norway (IFPI Norway)	Gold	5,000^{‡}
Sweden (GLF)	Gold	20,000^{‡}
United Kingdom (BPI)	Platinum	600,000^{‡}
United States (RIAA)	Platinum	1,000,000^{‡}
Streaming
Denmark (IFPI Danmark)	Gold	900,000^{†}
^{*} Sales figures based on certification alone.^{‡} Sales+streaming figures based on certification alone.^{†} Streaming-only figures based on certification alone.

== Release history ==
Release dates and formats for "The Other Side"
Region	Date	Format	Label(s)	Ref.
Worldwide	April 3, 2013	Digital download	Warner Bros.	
