= Tattoos (Jason Derulo album) =

2013 studio album by Jason Derulo

- Standard cover, the UK and Ireland release background color is Turquoise. The Tattoos on My Heart cover has a blue background and the neck tattoos removed, and the title at the top of the art.

Studio album by Jason Derulo
- Released: September 20, 2013
- Recorded: 2012–2013
- Genres: Pop; R&B
- Length: 38:19
- Labels: Beluga Heights; Warner Bros.
- Producers: Ammo; Today; BeatGeek; Jon Bellion; DJ Buddha; DJ Frank E; DJ Noodles; Carl Falk; Jonas Jeberg; Martin Johnson; Tearce "Kizzo"; Jared Lee; Joe London; RedOne; Ricky Reed; The Cataracs; Rami Yacoub

Jason Derulo chronology
| Future History (2011) | Tattoos (2013) | Talk Dirty (2014) |

Alternative cover
- Deluxe cover

Singles from Tattoos
- 1. "The Other Side" Released: April 3, 2013; 2. "Talk Dirty" Released: August 2, 2013; 3. "Marry Me" Released: August 26, 2013; 4. "Trumpets" Released: November 7, 2013; 5. "Stupid Love" Released: March 24, 2014; 6. "Wiggle" Released: May 6, 2014

Tattoos, (titled Tattoos on My Heart in Japan) is the third studio album by American singer Jason Derulo which features guest appearances from 2 Chainz, DJ Frank E, Jordin Sparks, Pitbull, and The Game. The album was released on September 20, 2013, through Beluga Heights Records and Warner Bros. Records internationally. The U.S. version of the album is a 5-track extended play, later reissued as Talk Dirty in 2014. Combining the danceable pop of his first two albums with harder-edged R&B, Derulo wanted the album to be "totally different" from his previous work and show the growth in his writing and his overall performance. Derulo co-wrote every song on the album. Its production was handled by RedOne, Ricky Reed, DJ Frank E, Jonas Jeberg and Martin Johnson, as well as others.

The album was preceded by the lead single "The Other Side", which peaked at number two in the UK. A second single, "Talk Dirty", featuring American rapper 2 Chainz, was released on August 2, 2013, topped the charts in 14 countries. Follow-up singles "Marry Me" was released a month before the album and reached the top-ten in Australia and top-twenty in New Zealand, whilst "Trumpets" was released in November 2013, peaking at number one in Australia. Derulo supported the album with The Tattoos World Tour. Upon its release, the album received generally mixed reviews from music critics, that were ambivalent towards its production and lyrical content. Tattoos debuted at number five on the Australian Albums Chart and the UK Albums Chart, where it became his highest-charting album in that country.

== Background ==
In January 2012, during rehearsals for his then upcoming "Future History World Tour", Derulo was practicing a stunt when he fell and broke his C2 vertebrae – leaving him in a neck brace for six months and forcing him to cancel his first headlining tour. "I was not able to dance, I couldn't even really bop my head. It's the simple things that you take for granted — not being able to perform for that amount of time, and also knowing that it could be gone in an instant." said Jason during an interview. "I wouldn't change the accident for anything because I've grown so much from it," Jason admits. Derulo then decided to channel all of this creative energy into studio time, on writing and recording his third album. He had written over 300 songs, recorded between 100 and 120 of those songs for the album and had to narrow them down to 12. A very difficult process for him as he states "I wanted to be sure that the album was a roller coaster ride, that every single song was totally different from the last... I wanted to be sure this album was far different from that one, to make sure that the growth was present. I'm 23 now. I really wanted this album to be a direct representation of who I am. I didn't want to hide anything. This album, I wanted to tell a story.

In the United States, Tattoos was only released as a 5-track extended play (EP); a full-length U.S.-exclusive version of the album titled Talk Dirty was released on April 15, 2014. The new songs on the album include new collaboration with rappers Kid Ink, Snoop Dogg and Tyga while the album's production was handled by Timbaland, The Cataracs, Ammo, Jon Bellion, DJ Mustard, Martin Johnson, RedOne, and Ricky Reed. The album includes all of the singles released from the international album including "Marry Me", "Talk Dirty" featuring 2 Chainz, "Stupid Love", "Trumpets" and "The Other Side" as well as the duet with his girlfriend Jordin Sparks on "Vertigo" and four additional newly recorded songs.

== Title and artwork ==
On July 23, 2013, Derulo announced the title of third studio album would be Tattoos. The title of the album was inspired by the months of rehabilitation during the recording process after he injured his neck while preparing for his tour. In an interview with Access Hollywood Live, when speaking of the album's title Derulo said:

"Life altering experiences are like tattoos stuck to you for life... Some are more painful than others, some may be ugly, so we wish we could undo them. Some may be so beautiful that we want to share them with the world. But, they're all part of the art that makes you who you are."

On August 8, 2013, just over a month away from its US release, after his performance on America's Got Talent, Derulo revealed the album's official artwork. The artwork is an illustration of Jason which shows a profile of his face, with designs shaved into his hair and the album's title written in ink on the side of his neck against a yellow shaded background. The Japanese edition is titled Tattoos on My Heart. The U.S. edition of the album will be titled Talk Dirty after the single of the same name and will include a brand new track list only for the United States.

The front cover was illustrated by Kadir Nelson.

== Release and promotion ==
The album's official date was revealed on July 22, 2013. following the release of "The Other Side" Jason went on a promo tour to promote the single including guest appearances on Chelsea Lately and Good Morning America. On May 7, 2013, Jason performed the song live on the sixteenth season of Dancing with the Stars. He also performed the song live on the 8th season of America's Got Talent on August 7, 2013. He also sang the song with cover singer Tyler Ward and in a trio with Keke Palmer and Max Schneider. They later posted the videos on YouTube. Derulo performed "Talk Dirty" for the first time at the House of Blues in Orlando in conjunction with 102 JAMZ's Presents Hook Up #4. where he also performed an acoustic cover of "The Other Side". he also performed the track at the iHeart Radio Live Coca-Cola Summer Concert Series in July 2013. Derulo is heading to Australia on a promotional tour, during which he will perform on the Sunrise morning show and perform on The X Factor Australia among other yet to be confirmed performances. While the full-length album will be released to international territories in 2013, Derulo said, "I know the fans they wanted something here (In the US) and I wanted to give the fans at least something other than just the single. So I'm doing the EP and then the album will come out shortly after that." The album contains an 11 track standard edition as well as a 14 track deluxe edition including 3 bonus tracks. The album's official standard edition track listing was released on August 26, 2013, along with the release of the album's third single "Marry Me".

=== Tour ===
Derulo will embarked on his second headlining solo concert tour titled the Tattoos World Tour in support of his third studio album. Pre-Sale tickets for the Australian leg of the tour went on sale on Tuesday, October 8. Regular tickets went on sale Friday, October 11, 2013 On October 8, 2013, Derulo announced additional dates in the UK, Ireland and other parts of Europe for March 2014. The tickets went on sale on October 11. on November 1, 2013, Derulo announced through his official Twitter account that Conor Maynard would be the supporting act for the European leg of the tour.

== Singles ==
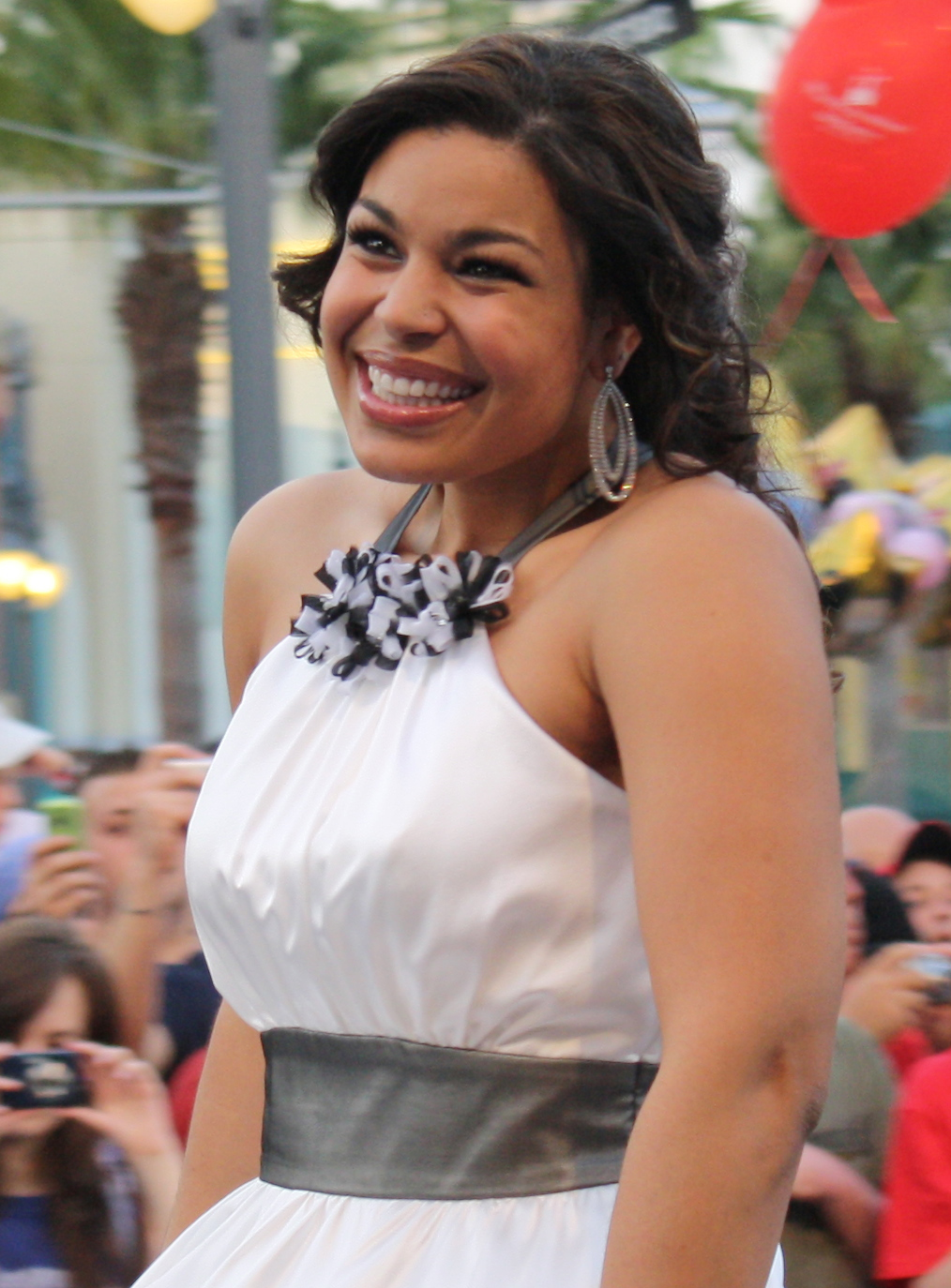
Jordin Sparks appears in the video for the US second single "Marry Me" because Derulo dedicated the song to her.

"The Other Side" was released as the album's lead single. It was sent to contemporary hit radio in the United States on May 10, 2013, and released via the iTunes Store in the United States on April 3, 2013. The song was written by Jason Desrouleaux, Joshua "Ammo" Coleman and Martin Johnson and produced by Ammo and Martin Johnson. "The Other Side" peaked at number 18 on the US Billboard Hot 100 and reached the top ten in Australia, Scotland, Canada and Ireland. It also made it chart debut and peaked in the top five on the UK singles charts at number 2 and at number 1 on the UK R&B singles chart. "The Other Side" surpassed 140,000 downloads on June 10, 2013, and was officially certified 2× Platinum by the Australian Recording Industry Association on July 31, 2013.

"Talk Dirty" was released as the second single to International markets on August 2, 2013, in New Zealand and later on in Australia on August 9, 2013, it was released in the UK on September 15, 2013. It features American hip hop recording artist 2 Chainz becoming Derulo's first single to contain a feature. The song was written by Jason Desrouleaux, Maxwell Douglas, Jason Evigan, Tauheed Epps, Ricky Reed, Eric Frederic, Ori Kaplan, Tamir Muskat (of Balkan Beat Box) and produced by Ricky Reed. The songs accompanying the music video have already been shot and were uploaded to Jason's official YouTube account on August 7, 2013. The song made its chart debut on the New Zealand Top 40 singles chart at number 27. The following week it jumped 18 places and since reached its peak position of number three in its fourth week on the chart. In Australia "Talk Dirty" debuted atop the ARIA top 40 singles chart becoming his second number 1 single in that country with his first being In My Head. It was released as the third single in the US on January 7, 2014, and has rocketed to No. 1 in 14 countries in total. It has since sold 2 million singles in the US to date.

"Marry Me" was released as the third overall single off the album (second single in the U.S.). The song made its US radio premiere on On Air with Ryan Seacrest on August 26, 2013. It was released to all digital retailers on the same day. The song's accompanying music video premiered on BET's 106 & Park on September 23, 2013. The video also features Derulo's longtime girlfriend Jordin Sparks who appears in the video due to Derulo writing the song about her. When speaking of the song Derulo said "Marry Me is one of those very pulling heart strings kind of record, it's very different than "The Other Side" … Basically it's talking about getting ready for that moment when I ask you to marry me". The song has since peaked at number 26 on the Billboard Hot 100 chart in the US and number 8 on the ARIA top 40 singles.

"Trumpets" served as the fourth single released off the album (third single in the UK) and was released on November 7, 2013. On October 11, 2013. In Australia, "Trumpets" debuted at number 22 the ARIA Singles Chart: it reached its peak position of number one in its fourth week on the chart, while it reached number 4 on the UK Singles Chart, however has since peaked at number 1 on the UK R&B Singles Chart. Lyrically the song is about being so in love with and infatuated with someone that every time you're together, trumpets blast through your head. The official music video for "Trumpets" was later released on November 3, 2013. Derulo made his first televised performance of the song during a promotional tour in the UK on The Paul O'Grady Show on December 10, 2013.

"Stupid Love" was released as the fifth international single from the album in 2014. The song's accompanying music video made its worldwide premiere online through Derulo's official YouTube channel on February 4, 2014. "Stupid Love" first appeared on the ARIA Singles Chart in Australia issue dated March 10, 2014, debuting at number thirty nine. In that same week the song also debuted on the Australian urban singles chart at number eight. In its second week on the chart the song jumped twenty-two spots to number seventeen on the singles chart, and jumped six spots to number 2 on the urban charts.

"Wiggle" was released as the first single (sixth overall) from the re-release of Tattoos on May 6, 2014.

"Bubblegum" was sent to Australian and New Zealand radio as the album's 7th single on August 3, 2014. An official lyric video was released on August 27.

== Critical reception ==
Professional ratings
Aggregate scores
| Source | Rating |
|---|---|
| Metacritic | 49/100 |
Review scores
| Source | Rating |
| AllMusic | 2/5 stars |
| Digital Spy | 3/5 stars |
| Fact | 1/5 discs |
| The Guardian | 3/5 stars |
| PopMatters | (6/10) |

Upon release, Tattoos has received generally mixed reviews. According to Metacritic, where they assign a weighted average score out of 100 to ratings and reviews from selected mainstream critics, the album received an average of 49, based on 4 reviews. AllMusic's Andy Kellman said that Tattoos wasn't necessarily more serious than his two preceding albums Jason Derulo (2009) and Future History (2011), however said that it is "a little heavier on songs regarding monogamy." He described the album as hardly "one a step forward", as most of the album's content covers a variety of songs about "devotion and settling down" there is still plenty of space for "content about short-term relationships." Marian Tuin from the Examiner, called the album "a therapeutic expression through songwriting." Digital Spy's, Robert Copsey summarised that Tattoos "may not be particularly bold or daring, but it's packed with enough hooks, singalong choruses and dancefloor-grabbing moments to make it a thoroughly enjoyable listen", rating the album 3 stars out of 5. Caroline Sullivan from The Guardian, Also rating it 3 stars out of a possible 5, praised the album as a whole for its "clubby hooks." Sullivan went on to say that Derulo, as with his previous 2 albums, hasn't quite "figured out what to do about his innate romanticism", calling the album "a battle between the lover in him and the priapic Lothario."

John Calvert of the UK magazine Fact gave the album its worst review, giving it a 1 out of a possible 5 star rating. Calvert called Tattoos a "disjointed hotchpotch of incompatible tones, styles and sentiment – a product of today's collectivised producer system whereby long-players are constructed like playlists. A gallery of trending white noise pop tropes blur into one, merging then with the equally anonymous presence that is the nondescript Derulo." In writing for PopMatters, Brent Faulkner had a more positive to mixed review of the album, rating the album a 6 out of 10, summarizing that the Tattoos "is a pleasant album with some bright moments as well as some average ones. One of the pitfalls of modern pop is consistently sounding distinct and fresh, something that Derülo is a victim of. Essentially, Derülo hits enough jump shots to win the game, but he could’ve played better down the stretch."

Reviewing the EP released in the United States, Dimas Sanfiorenzo had a positive review, stating the songs are "pretty enjoyable" but that it's "nothing groundbreaking".

== Commercial performance ==
On October 5, 2013, Tattoos opened on the UK official Albums Chart at number five, besting previous album Future History (2011) by two chart positions. However, on the UK R&B Albums Chart, Tattoos failed to match Future History's peak position of number one, only managing to debut at number two. As a result, it became Derulo's second highest charting album in the UK to date. In Australia, Tattoos debuted on the ARIA top 40 albums chart at number five; it became Derulo's third top-ten album, and second top five.

Tattoos also debuted in the top twenty in several other countries, including New Zealand, where it debuted at number ten; Norway, where it debuted at number seven; Ireland, where it debuted at number fourteen; and Switzerland, where it debuted at number thirteen. It also debuted outside the top ten on German albums chart at number 25.

== Track listing ==
=== LP versions ===
Tattoos - Standard edition (catalog number 602537415069)
| No. | Title | Writer(s) | Producer(s) | Length |
|---|---|---|---|---|
| 1. | "The Other Side" | Jason Desrouleaux; Martin Johnson; Joshua Coleman | Ammo; Johnson | 3:46 |
| 2. | "Talk Dirty" (featuring 2 Chainz) | Desrouleaux; Tauheed Epps; Eric Frederic; Jason Evigan; Sean Douglas; Tamir Muskat; Ori Kaplan; Tomer Yosef | Ricky Reed | 2:58 |
| 3. | "Marry Me" | Desrouleaux; Jonas Jeberg; Marlin "Hookman" Bonds; Andy Marvel | Jeberg | 3:45 |
| 4. | "Tattoo" | Desrouleaux; James Abrahart; Justin Franks; Vinay Vyas; Justin Davey; Oh, Hush! | DJ Frank E; Today | 3:26 |
| 5. | "Trumpets" | Desrouleaux; Jon Bellion | Bellion | 3:37 |
| 6. | "Vertigo" (featuring Jordin Sparks) | Desrouleaux; Jared Lee; Matt White | Lee | 3:53 |
| 7. | "Fire" (featuring Pitbull) | Desrouleaux; Urales Vargas; Armando C. Perez; Matthew Naples; Tierce Alec-John Person; Abrahart | DJ Buddha; DJ Noodles; Tearce "Kizzo" | 3:36 |
| 8. | "Side FX" (featuring The Game) | Desrouleau; Frederic; Douglas; Jayceon Taylor; Joe Spargur | Ricky Reed; Joe London^{[a]} | 3:29 |
| 9. | "Stupid Love" | Desrouleaux; Nadir Khayat; Novel Jannusi; Aleena Gibson; Molly Sandén; Jordan Sapp | RedOne; Rush; BeatGeek | 3:34 |
| 10. | "With the Lights On" | Desrouleaux; Niles Hollowell-Dhar; Marty Garton; Andrew Harr; Jermaine Jackson; Andre Davidson; Sean Davidson | The Cataracs | 3:11 |
| 11. | "Rest of Our Life" | Desrouleaux; Rami Yacoub; Carl Falk; Wayne Hector | Yacoub; Falk | 3:04 |
| Total length: | | | | 38:19 |

Deluxe and Japan edition bonus tracks
| No. | Title | Writer(s) | Producer(s) | Length |
|---|---|---|---|---|
| 12. | "Love Before I Die" | Desrouleaux; Khayat; Jannusi; AJ Junior; Bilal Hajji; Rachid Aziz | RedOne; BeatGeek | 3:46 |
| 13. | "Perfect Timing" | Desrouleaux; Abrahart; Frederic | Ricky Reed | 4:01 |
| 14. | "The Other Side" (acoustic) | Desrouleaux; Coleman; Johnson | Ammo; Johnson | 2:58 |
| Total length: | | | | 49:04 |

2014 International special edition bonus tracks
| No. | Title | Writer(s) | Producer(s) | Length |
|---|---|---|---|---|
| 12. | "Wiggle" (featuring Snoop Dogg) | Desrouleaux; Calvin Broadus; Frederic; Douglas]]; Jacob Kasher; John Ryan; Spargur; Andreas Schuller; Joe London | Reed | 3:13 |
| 13. | "Zipper" | Desrouleaux; Henry Walter; Sam Sumser; Chloe Angelides; Lukasz Gottwald; Kasher | Cirkut; Sumser; Angelides | 2:57 |
| 14. | "Bubblegum" (featuring Tyga) | Desrouleaux; Michael Stevenson; Tim Mosley; James Washington | Jim Beanz; Timbaland^{[a]} | 3:25 |
| 15. | "Kama Sutra" (featuring Kid Ink) | Desrouleaux; Brian Todd Collins; Dijon McFarlane; Christian Ward; Breyan Issac | DJ Mustard | 3:37 |
| Total length: | | | | 51:31 |

Australia special and digital deluxe edition bonus tracks
| No. | Title | Writer(s) | Producer(s) | Length |
|---|---|---|---|---|
| 16. | "Love Before I Die" | Desrouleaux; Khayat; Jannusi; AJ Junior; Bilal Hajji; Rachid Aziz | RedOne; BeatGeek | 3:46 |
| 17. | "Perfect Timing" | Desrouleaux; Abrahart; Frederic | RedOne; Alex P | 4:01 |
| 18. | "The Other Side" (acoustic) | Desrouleaux; Coleman; Johnson | Ammo; Johnson | 2:58 |
| Total length: | | | | 62:16 |

=== EP version ===
Tattoos - US edition
| No. | Title | Writer(s) | Producer(s) | Length |
|---|---|---|---|---|
| 1. | "The Other Side" | Desrouleaux; Coleman; Johnson | Ammo; Johnson | 3:46 |
| 2. | "Talk Dirty" (featuring 2 Chainz) | Desrouleaux; Epps; Frederic; Evigan; Douglas; Kaplan; Muskat; Yosef | Reed | 2:57 |
| 3. | "Marry Me" | Desrouleaux; Jeberg; Bonds; Marvel | Jeberg | 3:45 |
| 4. | "Tattoo" | Desrouleaux; Abrahart]]; Franks; Vyas; Davey; Oh, Hush! | DJ Frank E; Today | 3:26 |
| 5. | "Vertigo" (featuring Jordin Sparks) | Desrouleaux; Lee; White | Lee | 3:53 |
| Total length: | | | | 17:47 |

Notes

- ^{^[a]} signifies co-producer(s)

== Charts ==
=== Weekly charts ===
| Chart (2013) | Peak position |
|---|---|
| Australian Albums (ARIA) | 5 |
| Australian Urban Albums (ARIA) | 1 |
| Austrian Albums (Ö3 Austria) | 29 |
| Belgian Albums (Ultratop Flanders) | 14 |
| Belgian Albums (Ultratop Wallonia) | 36 |
| Dutch Albums (Album Top 100) | 46 |
| Finnish Albums (Suomen virallinen lista) | 28 |
| French Albums (SNEP) | 80 |
| German Albums (Offizielle Top 100) | 25 |
| Hungarian Albums (MAHASZ) | 16 |
| Irish Albums (IRMA) | 14 |
| New Zealand Albums (RMNZ) | 10 |
| Norwegian Albums (VG-lista) | 1 |
| Scottish Albums (Official Charts) | 8 |
| Spanish Albums (Promusicae) | 65 |
| Swedish Albums (Sverigetopplistan) | 7 |
| Swiss Albums (Schweizer Hitparade) | 13 |
| UK Albums (Official Charts) | 5 |
| UK Album Downloads (Official Charts) | 5 |
| UK R&B Albums (Official Charts) | 2 |

=== Year-end charts ===
| Chart (2013) | Position |
|---|---|
| Australian Albums (ARIA) | 85 |
| UK Albums (OCC) | 147 |
| Chart (2014) | Position |
| Australian Albums (ARIA) | 70 |
| Belgian Albums (Ultratop Flanders) | 139 |
| Swedish Albums (Sverigetopplistan) | 13 |
| Chart (2015) | Position |
| Danish Albums (Tracklisten) | 94 |

== Certifications ==
| Region | Certification | Certified units/sales |
|---|---|---|
| Australia (ARIA) | Platinum | 70,000^{‡} |
| Canada (Music Canada) | Platinum | 80,000^{‡} |
| Denmark (IFPI Danmark) | Platinum | 20,000^{‡} |
| Germany (BVMI) | Gold | 100,000^{‡} |
| New Zealand (RMNZ) | Platinum | 15,000^{‡} |
| Sweden (GLF) | Gold | 20,000^{‡} |
| United Kingdom (BPI) | Gold | 100,000^{*} |
^{*} Sales figures based on certification alone.^{‡} Sales+streaming figures based on certification alone.

== Release history ==
| Region | Date | Version | Format | Label |
|---|---|---|---|---|
| Australia | September 20, 2013 | Standard edition | Digital download | Warner Bros. Records |
| Belgium | September 20, 2013 | Standard edition; Deluxe edition | Digital download | Warner Bros. Records |
| Denmark | September 20, 2013 | Standard edition; Deluxe edition | Digital download | Warner Bros. Records |
| Finland | September 20, 2013 | Standard edition; Deluxe edition | Digital download | Warner Bros. Records |
| Italy | September 20, 2013 | Standard edition; Deluxe edition | Digital download | Warner Bros. Records |
| France | September 20, 2013 | Standard edition; Deluxe edition | Digital download | Warner Bros. Records |
| Netherlands | September 20, 2013 | Standard edition; Deluxe edition | Digital download | Warner Bros. Records |
| New Zealand | September 20, 2013 | Standard edition; Deluxe edition | Digital download | Warner Bros. Records |
| Norway | September 20, 2013 | Standard edition; Deluxe edition | Digital download | Warner Bros. Records |
| Sweden | September 20, 2013 | Standard edition; Deluxe edition | Digital download | Warner Bros. Records |
| South Africa | September 20, 2013 | Standard edition; Deluxe edition | Digital download | Warner Bros. Records |
| Spain | September 20, 2013 | Standard edition; Deluxe edition | Digital download | Warner Bros. Records |
| United Kingdom | September 20, 2013 | Standard edition; Deluxe edition | Digital download | Warner Bros. Records |
| France | September 23, 2013 | Standard edition | CD | Warner Bros. Records |
| Germany | September 23, 2013 | Standard edition | CD | Warner Bros. Records |
| United Kingdom | September 23, 2013 | Standard edition | CD | Warner Bros. Records |
| Canada | September 23, 2013 | Standard edition | Digital download | Warner Bros. Records |
| United States | September 24, 2013 | Extended play | Digital download | Warner Bros. Records |
| Japan | September 25, 2013 | Standard edition | CD | Warner Bros. Records |
| United Kingdom | April 14, 2014 | Special edition | Digital download | Warner Bros. Records |
| Australia | April 18, 2014 | Special edition | CD | Warner Bros. Records |
