= Jason Derulo =

American singer-songwriter and dancer (born 1989)

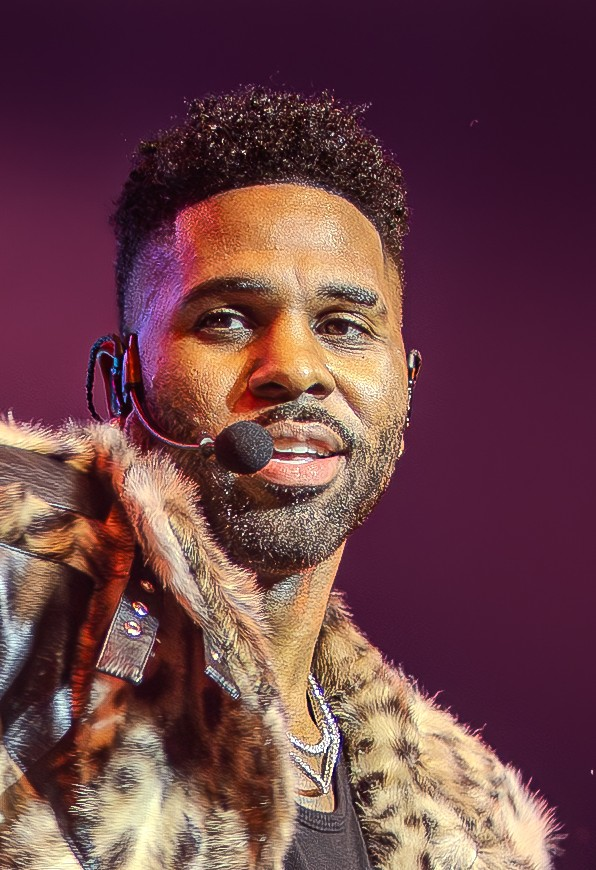
- Derulo in 2026
- Born: Jason Joel Desrouleaux; September 21, 1989 (age 37); Miramar, Florida, U.S.
- Occupations: Singer; songwriter; dancer
- Years active: 2006–present
- Children: 1
- Musical career
- Genres: Pop; R&B; EDM
- Labels: Warner; Atlantic; Beluga Heights; Asylum
- Website: jasonderulo.com

Jason Joel Desrouleaux (born September 21, 1989), known professionally as Jason Derulo (/dəˈruːloʊ/; formerly stylized as Derülo), is an American singer, songwriter, and dancer. Since the start of his solo recording career in 2009, he has sold over 250 million singles worldwide and has achieved fourteen platinum singles in the US.

After contributing and writing songs for various artists, Derulo signed to recording label Beluga Heights, owned by record producer and industry veteran J. R. Rotem. After Beluga Heights became part of the Warner Music Group, Derulo became a recording artist and released his debut single "Whatcha Say" in May 2009. It sold over five million digital downloads, earned an RIAA certification of quintuple platinum, and reached number one on the US Billboard Hot 100. He followed with the US top-ten singles "In My Head" and "Ridin' Solo", the former of which topped the UK Singles Chart, and his self-titled debut studio album Jason Derulo (2010). His second album, Future History (2011), yielded the UK number-one single "Don't Wanna Go Home" and top-ten hit "It Girl". His third international album, Tattoos (2013), was repackaged in the US as Talk Dirty (2014) and spawned the worldwide hit singles "Talk Dirty", "Trumpets", and "Wiggle".

Derulo's fourth studio album, Everything Is 4 (2015), was preceded by "Want to Want Me", his sixth top-ten hit in the US and his fourth number-one in the UK. In 2020, Derulo released the single "Savage Love (Laxed – Siren Beat)" alongside New Zealander record producer Jawsh 685, which topped charts worldwide. Following a remix with South Korean boy band BTS, the song reached number one on the US Billboard Hot 100, becoming Derulo's second chart-topper in the country. He departed from Warner Music Group due to creative differences and signed with Atlantic Records in 2021. Derulo released his fifth studio album Nu King in 2024, which included many of his previous singles such as "Swalla" and "Take You Dancing".

== Early life ==
Derulo was born as Jason Joel Desrouleaux on September 21, 1989, in Miramar, Florida, the son of Haitian parents. Derulo's first language was Haitian Creole. His mother went to law school. He started singing at a young age. He attended performing arts schools in Florida and made some early attempts at music composition, writing his first song at the age of eight. His writing skills began attracting attention when he was a teenager. He also debuted on the song "My Life" for Pitbull and also featured and wrote "Bossy" for Birdman, a New Orleans–based rapper, and made a guest appearance on the song, thus highlighting his ability as a vocalist.

== Career ==
=== 2006–2010: Beginnings and Jason Derulo ===
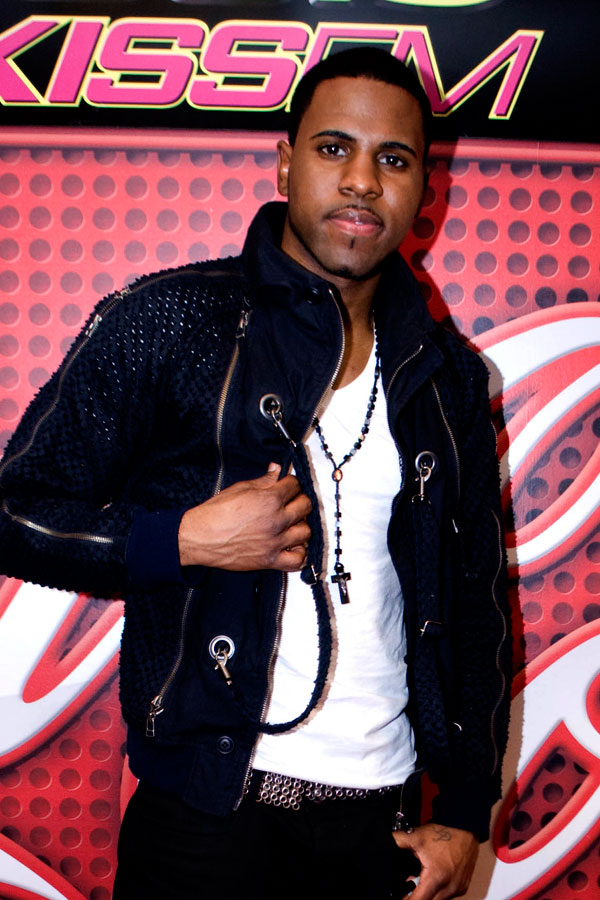
Derulo in 2010

Derulo has been writing songs for artists including Diddy, Danity Kane, Donnie Klang, Sean Kingston, Cassie, and Lil Wayne since he was young, also intending on becoming a solo performer. After attending performing arts schools, such as The American Musical and Dramatic Academy, and honing his talents as a singer and dancer, as well as acting in theatre productions like Ragtime and Smokey Joe's Cafe, Derulo won the grand prize on the 2006 season finale of the TV show Showtime at the Apollo. Derulo was discovered by music producer J. R. Rotem, who signed him to his record label Beluga Heights Records and Warner Bros. Records.

In a HitQuarters interview, Rotem highlighted Derulo's dedication to his art by saying, "Jason Derulo has one of the most impressive work ethics I've ever come across – he just keeps knocking out songs in the studio. That's an amazing quality."

On August 4, 2009, Derulo released his debut single, "Whatcha Say". It was produced by J. R. Rotem with additional production by Fuego. The track heavily samples the Imogen Heap song "Hide and Seek". In late August 2009, the song debuted at number 54 on the Billboard Hot 100 and hit number 1 in November 2009. It was Derulo's first number-one hit. The single's music video was released in September 2009; after the single became successful, Derulo began work on his debut album. He released the second single from his album, "In My Head", on December 8, 2009. It debuted at number 63 on the Billboard Hot 100, and reached number five.

Derulo's debut album, Jason Derulo, stylised with an umlaut as Jason Derülo, was released on March 2, 2010. Jason Derulo first charted within the top ten of the UK and Irish Albums Charts in early March 2010. He spent six weeks promoting the album in his appearances as one of the opening acts for Lady Gaga's 2009–2010 The Monster Ball Tour. The third single of the album is "Ridin' Solo", which was released worldwide on April 26, 2010. By July, the single had reached number nine in the Billboard Hot 100. Derulo has also been featured in a song by new artist Will Roush called "Turn it Up", which also features Stat Quo and Young Buck. He also collaborated with UK singer Pixie Lott on a song titled "Coming Home" from the re-released edition of her album Turn It Up.

=== 2011–2012: Future History and other ventures ===
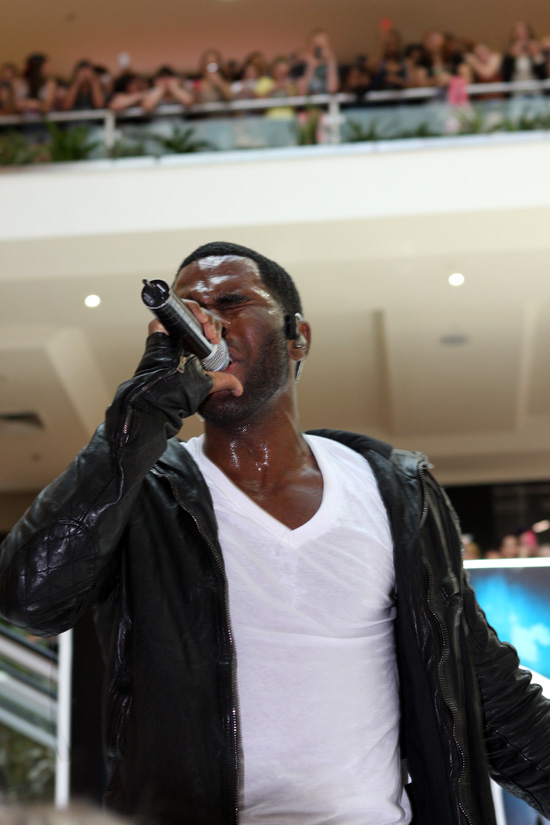
Derulo performing in 2011

In 2011, Derulo recorded a track with pop rock singer Demi Lovato titled "Together" for her album Unbroken. His second studio album, Future History, was released on September 27, 2011. Derulo detailed his journey recording the album via a series of webisodes posted on his official website. Its lead single, "Don't Wanna Go Home", was released on May 20, 2011. It landed the number-one spot in the UK and in the top five in Australia. Derulo planned to embark on an eight-date UK tour in support of the album in February 2012, including a show at Wembley Arena on March 1. However, on January 3, 2012, while doing 50 backflips as an endurance test during rehearsal for his Future History Tour, Derulo broke his C2 vertebrae, an injury known as the hangman's break. As a result, he canceled all of his tour dates.

On March 28, 2012, Derulo appeared on American Idol to announce he would allow fans to help him finish the lyrics for a new song entitled "Undefeated", as part of a partnership with American Idol and Coca-Cola. Fans were given the opportunity to submit their own lyrics to complete the song, and fans were then given the chance to vote on which lyrics they liked the most. On May 5, 2012, Derulo announced that his first post-neck injury television performance would be on the eleventh-season finale of American Idol, on May 22, 2012. In August 2012, Derulo became a dance master alongside Kelly Rowland, for the first season of the Australian dance talent show Everybody Dance Now. The show was cancelled shortly after its fourth episode aired due to poor ratings.

On July 9, 2012, Derulo announced that he had signed Australian singer-songwriter Arlene Zelina to his record label Future History (co-owned with his manager Frank Harris) after he attended one of her performances at Whisky a Go Go in 2011 before she returned to Melbourne, Australia. On July 10, 2012, Derulo confirmed this on his Twitter.

=== 2013–2014: Tattoos and Talk Dirty ===
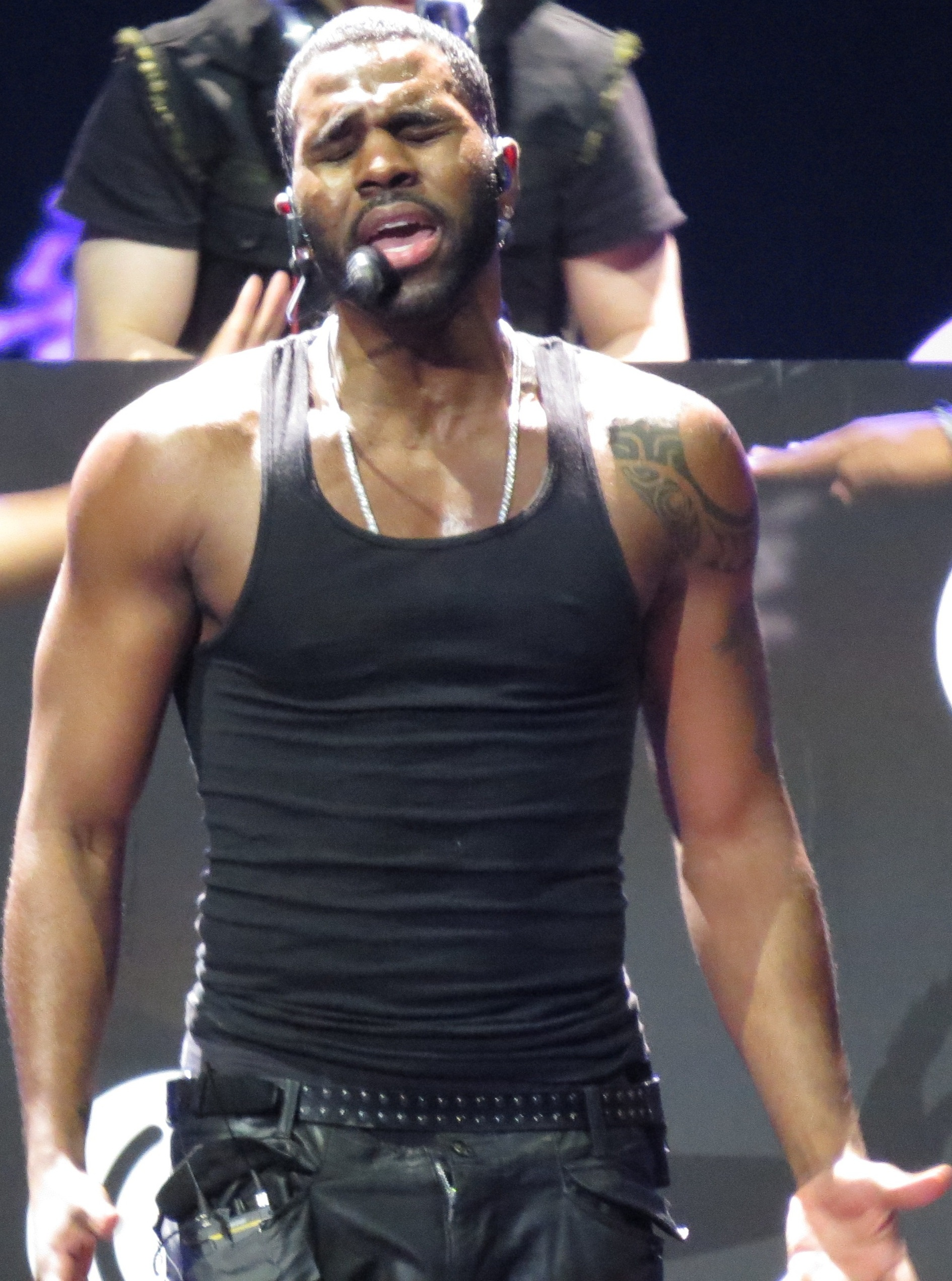
Derulo performing in 2013

On April 16, 2013, Derulo released his single, "The Other Side" to radio on April 23, 2013. As of July 4, 2013 "The Other Side" peaked at No. 18 on the Billboard Hot 100. Derulo announced via Twitter that his third album would be called Tattoos. The album was released on September 24, 2013. The album's second single, "Talk Dirty", was released internationally on July 27, 2013 (digitally). "Talk Dirty" peaked at number three on the Billboard Hot 100.

The album features American hip-hop recording artist 2 Chainz; it is the first single from Derulo to contain a feature. The tracks accompanying music video had already been shot and was released in early August 2013.

"Marry Me" made its US radio premiere on On Air with Ryan Seacrest on August 26, 2013. It was scheduled to be released to all digital retailers as the second single to the U.S. market, third overall, on the same day. On December 11, 2013, he was the headline act for Radio City Live in the Echo Arena, Liverpool. He performed Ridin' Solo and Talk Dirty.

Six months after Derulo's third album Tattoos was released (other than in the U.S) he announced on March 18, 2014, that he would be releasing an album with four newly recorded songs and seven from Tattoos as the U.S album and that it would have different artwork and be re-titled Talk Dirty. Talk Dirty was released on April 15, 2014. That same day, Jason Derulo released the special edition of Tattoos in the UK, which included the four new songs from the Talk Dirty album.

On November 21, 2014, Pitbull released a song off the album Globalization featuring Jason Derulo and Juicy J titled "Drive You Crazy", which was later to become a single on August 21, 2015.

=== 2015–2016: Everything Is 4 ===
On January 22, 2015, Dick Clark Productions announced that Derulo would be a judge in the upcoming 12th season of So You Think You Can Dance, alongside new judge Paula Abdul and returning judge Nigel Lythgoe. "I am truly excited, and eagerly look forward to joining the cast of So You Think You Can Dance," said Derulo. "It is one of the most respected and longest-tenured shows on network television, and I hope to be a part of new growth and continued success."

On March 9, Derulo released the first single from his forthcoming fourth studio album, Everything Is 4, called "Want to Want Me". "Want To Want Me" became the most-added track in the history of Top 40 radio: it was added to 156 monitored pop stations, making it the biggest Top 40 US radio launch thus far. It peaked at number five on the Billboard Hot 100 and topped the UK Singles Chart. The music video for his second single, "Cheyenne", was released on June 30, 2015.

On June 29, Derulo announced the release of his first greatest hits album, titled Platinum Hits. Platinum Hits was released on July 29, 2016, with a brand-new song called "Kiss the Sky", which appears on the soundtrack to the film Storks. The album features 11 platinum certified singles.

On September 28, 2016, Derulo guest starred in an episode of the Fox drama Lethal Weapon.

=== 2017–2020: 2Sides, Cats and departure from Warner Music ===
On February 24, 2017, Derulo released a new single entitled "Swalla", featuring Nicki Minaj and Ty Dolla $ign. On March 17, Pitbull and Derulo released the song "Educate Ya", from the former's album Climate Change. On March 31, Cheyenne Frontier Days announced they added Jason Derulo to their 2017 Frontier Nights concert lineup on Friday, July 28, 2017. At the 2017 Billboard Music Awards on May 21, Derulo announced that his next studio album would be titled 777. "If I'm Lucky" was then released on September 1. "Tip Toe" (featuring French Montana) was released soon after, on November 10. "Swalla" and "Tip Toe" were expected to be included on the album, according to Derulo. The album was later renamed 2Sides. Derulo explains the reason why he changed the album's name, saying:

"777 was a stage in my life and it has taken a long time to do this album but this name, 2Sides, is more poignant to where I think I am now in my life and what I think the album exudes—the light and the dark side of who I am—the album exemplifies that in both ways. "People have never seen the urban side of what I do as well so they'll get to see that side for the first time. It's an album that has so many different faces so 2Sides was the more appropriate title."

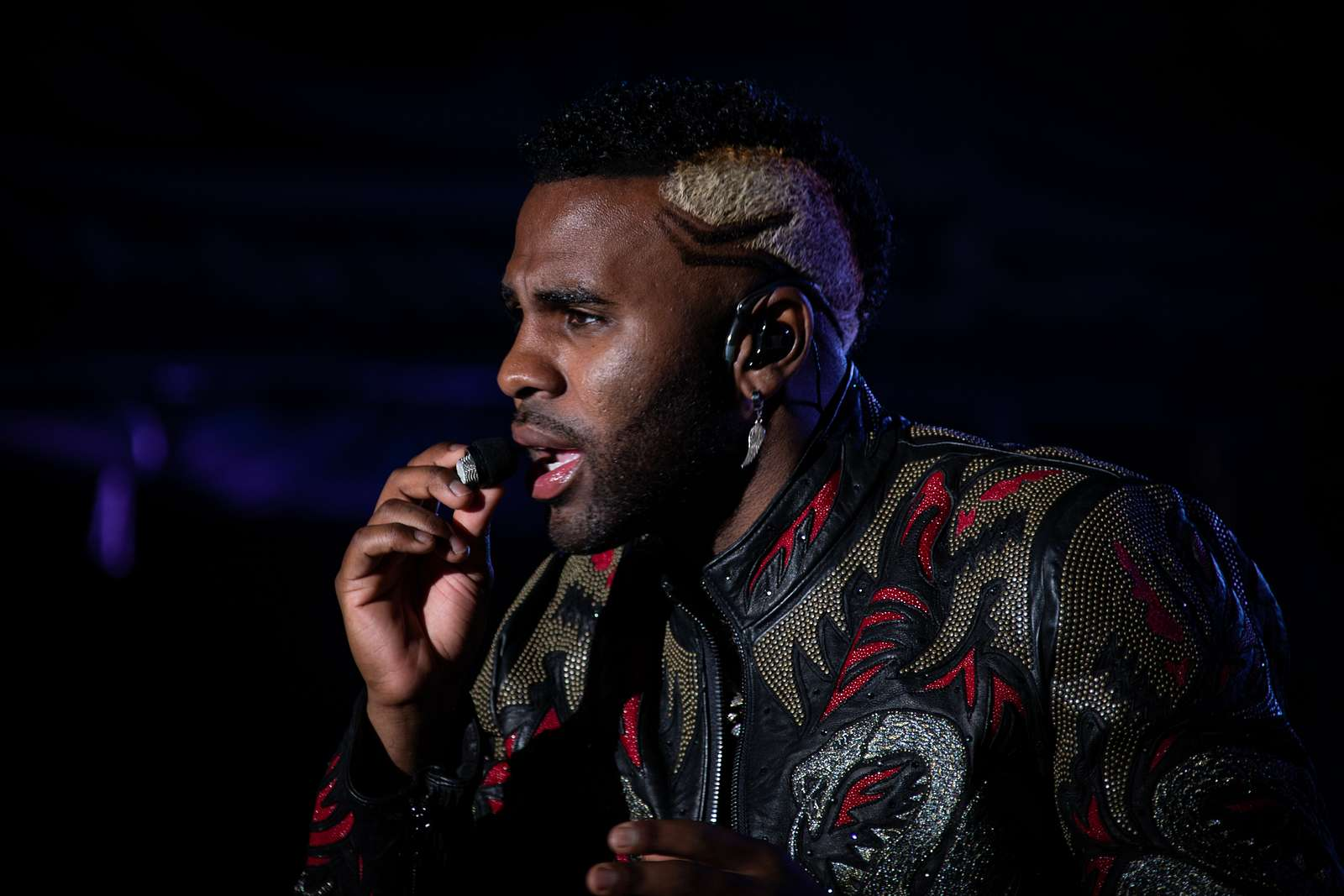
Derulo performing the 2019 Camp Foster Festival in Okinawa, Japan

"Goodbye", a joint-collaboration with David Guetta and featuring Nicki Minaj and Willy William, was released on August 24, 2018. In 2019, Derulo released the singles "Let's Shut Up & Dance" with Lay Zhang and NCT 127 on February 22, "Mamacita", featuring Farruko, on July 5, and "Too Hot" on August 27. In a telephone interview with the Official Charts Company, Derulo revealed that he will release "a seven-track EP and then another one shortly after", and that his previous singles "Swalla", "If I'm Lucky", "Tip Toe", and "Goodbye" will not be included on this project because "those songs have had their time. Even though putting them on an album would make it go platinum in two seconds, it’s not about the numbers. These are brand new songs, brand new vibes." 2Sides (Side 1), the first part of 2Sides, was released on November 8, 2019, with 2Sides (Side 2) arriving in 2020. Derulo starred as Rum Tum Tugger in the film Cats, which premiered on December 20, 2019. For the role, he was nominated for the Golden Raspberry Award for Worst Screen Combo, with "his CGI-neutered bulge", which was a reference to a photo he posted on Instagram earlier that year, with a prominent outline of his penis.

In May 2020, Derulo confirmed that after a lengthy negotiation, he had left his record contract with Warner Bros. Records due to creative differences. By leaving the label, Derulo also cancelled the release of 2Sides (Side 2), but confirmed that new music would arrive later in 2020. In June 2020, "Savage Love (Laxed – Siren Beat)" by Derulo and Jawsh 685 went viral on TikTok, eventually peaking at number one in the UK, becoming Derulo's 5th number one in the country. The song was originally released without properly clearing and attributing a prominent sample in the song to Jawsh 685. The clearance issue was resolved and the song was eventually re-released and credited to both artists. The song was later remixed by BTS, wherein the remix reached number one on the Billboard Hot 100, becoming Derulo's second chart topper in the region (his first since "Whatcha Say" in 2009, the longest time between number-one hits for male artists since Dr. Dre's "Crack a Bottle" reached number one after a 12-year hiatus in 2009).

In November 2020, Derulo released another single entitled "Love Not War (The Tampa Beat)" featuring New Caledonian beat producer Nuka. It was inspired from the latter's SoundCloud track known as "The Tampa Beat" which was earlier released in 2018, and has been used in over 23 million TikTok videos.

=== 2021–present: Singles, collaborations and Nu King ===
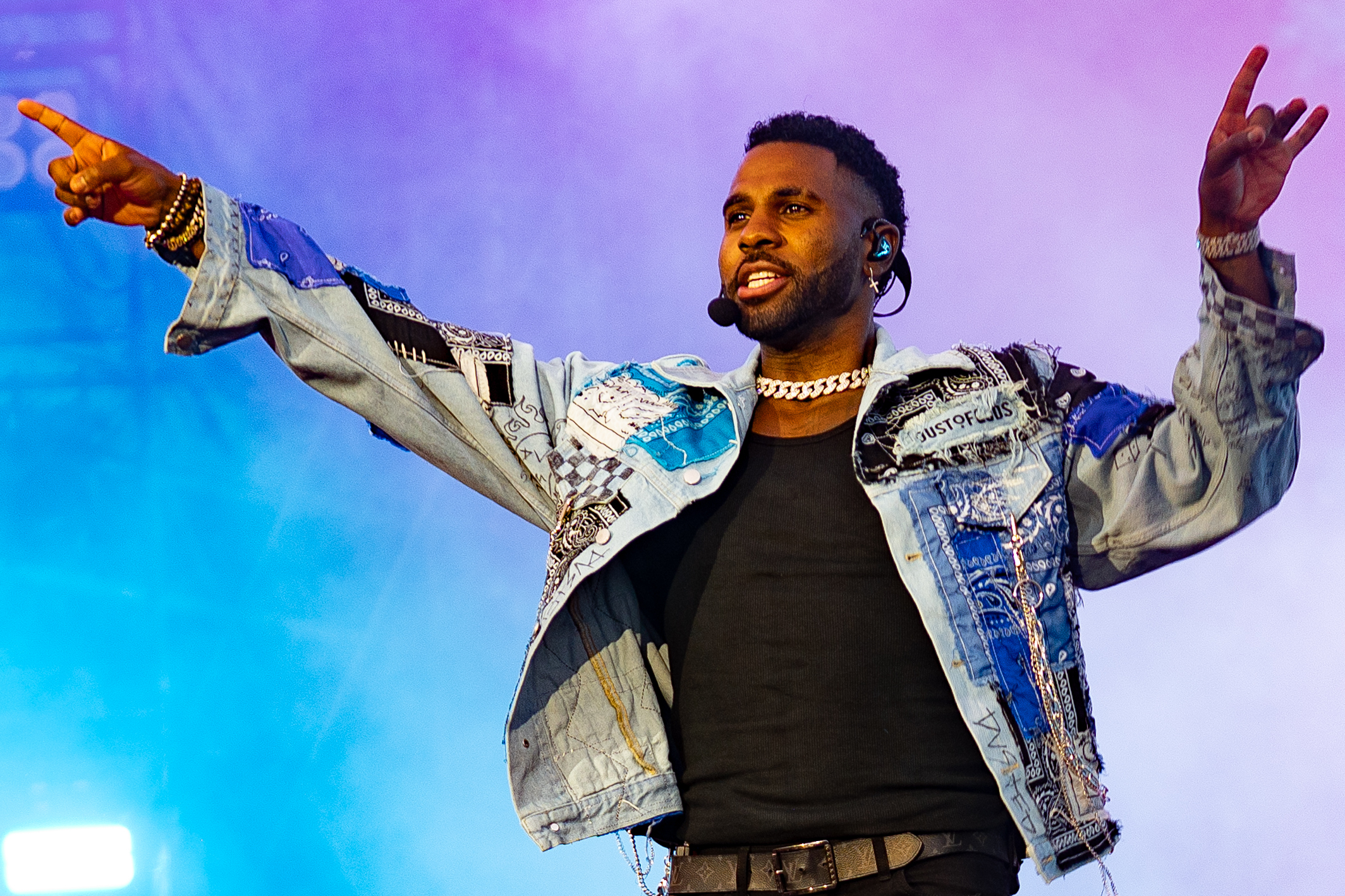
Derulo performing at the Superbloom Festival in 2023

Derulo signed with Atlantic Records in March 2021. In May, Derulo featured on the remix of "Jalebi Baby" by Indian-Canadian singer Tesher. On September 3, Derulo released his new single "Acapulco". In March 2023, Derulo was announced as a judge for the Australian version of the singing competition, The Voice, replacing Keith Urban. Later that month, he starred as Isley Brothers frontman Ron Isley in the biographical film Spinning Gold. On May 18, 2023, Derulo released the single "When Love Sucks", which features singer Dido, sampling the latter's 2000 single "Thank You". On September 27, 2023, Derulo performed a medley of his upcoming song "Hands on Me" with Meghan Trainor and "Take You Dancing" during the finale of season 18 of America's Got Talent.

After being introduced to TikTok by his nieces and nephews, Derulo began posting content on TikTok. His account has amassed a sizable following, becoming one of the most-followed on the platform.

On February 16, 2024, he released his long-awaited fifth studio album titled Nu King, his first studio album since Everything is 4 (2015). The album features some of his big hits since his last album, as singles, including "Take You Dancing", "Love Not War (The Tampa Beat)", and "Lifestyle", as well as his recent song "Hands on Me" on which he collaborated with Meghan Trainor.

In May 2026, he appeared in the second episode of season 9 of Mask Singer (French version of The Masked Singer) on TF1 as an "international star."

== Artistry ==
Derulo's music is generally pop or R&B, but also incorporates dance-pop and EDM. He has predominantly named Michael Jackson as his inspiration. Derulo states "He is the reason I am who I am today. When I was 4 years old, I saw him for the first time. I saw how he moved the crowd and how people were just so touched". His other musical influences include Elvis Presley, Madonna, Prince, Usher and Justin Timberlake. Billboard's Jason Lipshutz speaks on his overall music and sound stating he operates "in two musical modes", describing one as "positive PG-romance dance-pop personality", and the other as a "bumping, faux-crass club thumpers". He explained that "Derulo has been tweaking his two modes just enough as they are used to offset each other, so that audiences never grew sick of either style".

== Personal life ==
Derulo and singer Jordin Sparks dated for three years, before ending their relationship in September 2014. On May 8, 2021, he had a son with his girlfriend Jena Frumes. The couple broke up four and a half months later. Derulo also has three nieces.

Derulo is a co-owner of the Omaha Supernovas, a professional women's volleyball team that competes in the Pro Volleyball Federation. He is a supporter of English football club Leicester City.

=== Lawsuit ===
In October 2023, singer Emaza Gibson (also known as Emaza Dilan) filed a lawsuit against Derulo alleging quid pro quo sexual harassment, intimidation, and breach of contract. According to the suit, Gibson was signed to Derulo’s label, Future History, in 2021, and the two began recording music together, with Derulo acting as her "mentor, supervisor, [and] agent". Gibson claims that Derulo was prone to angry outbursts, and that he repeatedly pressured her to drink and have sex with him, though she refused. She was dropped from the label in September of 2022. Derulo’s manager Frank Harris, Future History, and Atlantic Records were also named in the lawsuit.

In April 2024, a California judge dismissed the case based on forum selection clauses in the contracts Gibson had signed with Derulo and Atlantic Records, which stipulated that all disputes must be settled in New York City, and granted the plaintiffs a change of venue. Gibson and her lawyers stated their intent to refile the suit in New York.

=== Cryptocurrency ventures ===
Derulo has been involved in numerous cryptocurrency ventures that have been described as "scams" or "rug pulls".

== Discography ==
- Jason Derulo (2010)
- Future History (2011)
- Tattoos (2013; reissued in 2014 as Talk Dirty)
- Everything Is 4 (2015)
- Nu King (2024)

== Tours ==
Headlining

- AOL AIM presents: Jason Derülo (2010–11)
- Tattoos World Tour (2014)
- Talk Dirty Tour (2014–15)
- Everything Is 4 Tour (2016)
- 2Sides World Tour (2018–19)
- Nu King World Tour (2024)
- The Last Dance World Tour (2026)

Residencies

- The Best Show Ever (2024)

== Filmography ==
Television
| Year | Title | Role | Notes |
|---|---|---|---|
| 2010 | Turn the Beat Around | Himself | |
| 2012 | Everybody Dance Now | Himself | Dance master, season 1 |
| 2012 | State of Georgia | Himself | Season 1, "The Popular Chicks" |
| 2013 | Dancing with the Stars | Himself | Musical guest |
| 2014, 2015 | So You Think You Can Dance | Himself | Guest Judge |
| 2015 | Empire | Himself | Season 2, "Et Tu, Brute?" |
| 2016 | Lip Sync Battle | Himself | Episode "Katharine McPhee vs. Jason Derulo" |
| 2016 | Lethal Weapon | Ronald Dawson | Season 1, "Surf N Turf" |
| 2016 | CMT Crossroads | Himself | with Luke Bryan |
| 2017 | Sounds Like Friday Night | Himself | Guest host & performer |
| 2017 | The Voice of Germany | Himself | Guest coach |
| 2017 | Drop the Mic | Himself | Episode: Niecy Nash vs. Cedric the Entertainer / Liam Payne vs. Jason Derulo |
| 2023 | The Voice (Australia) | Himself/Coach | Season 12 |

Film
| Year | Title | Role | Notes |
|---|---|---|---|
| 2019 | Cats | Rum Tum Tugger | |
| 2023 | Spinning Gold | Ronald Isley | |

Web
| Year | Title | Role | Notes |
|---|---|---|---|
| 2020 | SML | Himself | Episode: "Chef Pee Pee Goes To Hollywood!" |

Podcast
| Year | Title | Role | Notes |
|---|---|---|---|
| 2023 | Underwater | Nico | 8 episodes |

== Awards and nominations ==
| Year | Organization | Award | Work | Result |
|---|---|---|---|---|
| 2010 | Teen Choice Awards | Choice Breakout Male Artist | Himself | Nominated |
| 2010 | Teen Choice Awards | Choice R&B Track | "In My Head" | Won |
| 2010 | Teen Choice Awards | Choice R&B Album | Jason Derulo | Won |
| 2010 | MTV Video Music Awards | Best Male Video | "In My Head" | Nominated |
| 2010 | MTV Video Music Awards | Best New Artist | "In My Head" | Nominated |
| 2010 | MTV Europe Music Awards | Best New Act | Himself | Nominated |
| 2010 | MTV Europe Music Awards | Best Push Act | Himself | Nominated |
| 2010 | ARIA Music Awards | Most Popular International Artist | Himself | Nominated |
| 2010 | American Music Awards | New Artist of the Year | Himself | Nominated |
| 2011 | NAACP Image Award | Outstanding New Artist | Himself | Nominated |
| 2011 | BMI Pop Music Awards | Songwriter of the Year | "In My Head", "Ridin' Solo", "Whatcha Say, Replay" | Won |
| 2011 | BMI Pop Music Awards | 50 Most Performed Songs of the Year | "Replay" | Won |
| 2011 | Teen Choice Awards | Choice Male Artist | Himself | Nominated |
| 2011 | Teen Choice Awards | Choice R&B/Hip-Hop Track | "Don't Wanna Go Home" | Nominated |
| 2011 | Teen Choice Awards | Choice Summer: Music Star Male | Himself | Nominated |
| 2011 | MOBO Awards | Best International Act | Himself | Nominated |
| 2012 | MTV Video Music Awards Japan | Best R&B Video | "It Girl" | Nominated |
| 2012 | MTV Europe Music Awards | Best World Stage Performance | Himself | Nominated |
| 2013 | MOBO Awards | Best International Artist | Himself | Nominated |
| 2014 | Teen Choice Awards | Choice Music: Male Artist | Himself | Nominated |
| 2014 | Teen Choice Awards | Choice Music: Star Male | Himself | Won |
| 2014 | Teen Choice Awards | Choice Music Single: Male Artist | "Talk Dirty" | Nominated |
| 2014 | Teen Choice Awards | Choice Music: Summer Song | "Wiggle" | Nominated |
| 2014 | MTV Video Music Awards | Best Pop Video | "Talk Dirty" | Nominated |
| 2014 | MTV Video Music Awards | Best Choreography | "Talk Dirty" | Nominated |
| 2014 | ARIA Music Awards | Best International Artist | Tattoos | Nominated |
| 2014 | Los Premios 40 Principales | Best International Act | Himself | Nominated |
| 2014 | Los Premios 40 Principales | Best International Album | Tattoos | Nominated |
| 2014 | Los Premios 40 Principales | Best International Song | "Talk Dirty" | Won |
| 2014 | Los Premios 40 Principales | Best International Video | "Wiggle" | Nominated |
| 2015 | YouTube Music Awards | 50 artists to watch | Himself | Won |
| 2015 | Brasil Music Awards | International Artist | Himself | Nominated |
| 2015 | Teen Choice Awards | Choice Male Artist | Himself | Nominated |
| 2015 | Teen Choice Awards | Choice Summer Music Star: Male | Himself | Nominated |
| 2016 | LOS40 Music Awards | Lo + 40 Artist Award | Himself | Won |
| 2017 | CMT Music Awards | CMT Performance of the Year | "Want to Want Me" (with Luke Bryan) | Won |
| 2018 | MTV Europe Music Awards | Best World Stage | Himself | Nominated |
| 2020 | Golden Raspberry Awards | Worst Screen Combo | Cats (with "his CGI-neutered 'bulge'") | Nominated |
| 2020 | Melon Music Awards | Best Pop | "Savage Love (Laxed – Siren Beat) (BTS Remix)" (with Jawsh 685 and BTS) | Nominated |
| 2021 | Kids' Choice Awards | Favorite Male Social Star | Himself | Nominated |
| 2021 | Gaon Chart Music Awards | Song of the Year – October | "Savage Love (Laxed – Siren Beat) (BTS Remix)" (with Jawsh 685 and BTS) | Nominated |
| 2021 | iHeartRadio Music Awards | TikTok Bop of the Year | "Savage Love (Laxed – Siren Beat)" (with Jawsh 685) | Nominated |
| 2022 | Mirchi Music Awards | Listener's Choice Award | "Jalebi Baby" (with Tesher) | Nominated |
