= Talk Dirty (Jason Derulo song) =

Single by Jason Derulo featuring 2 Chainz

from the album Tattoos and Talk Dirty
- Released: August 2, 2013 (NZ); August 9, 2013 (AUS); September 15, 2013 (EU, UK); January 7, 2014 (US)
- Recorded: 2012
- Genre: R&B; dance-pop; pop rap
- Length: 2:58
- Label: Beluga Heights; Warner Bros.
- Songwriters: Jason Desrouleaux; Tauheed Epps; Eric Frederic; Jason Evigan; Sean Douglas; Ori Kaplan; Tamir Muskat; Tomer Yosef
- Producer: Ricky Reed

Jason Derulo singles chronology
"The Other Side" (2013)	"Talk Dirty" (2013)	"Marry Me" (2013)

2 Chainz singles chronology
"My Story" (2013)	"Talk Dirty" (2013)	"Used 2" (2013)

"Talk Dirty" is a song by American singer Jason Derulo, released as the second single from his third studio album, Tattoos (2013), in Europe and Australia. Derulo's third studio album was retitled Talk Dirty for its American release, featuring an alternative track listing. It was released as the third single in the United States on January 7, 2014. The song features hip-hop rapper 2 Chainz, making it Derulo's first single to feature a guest performer, excluding the French-language version of his debut song "Whatcha Say". The artists co-wrote the song with Jason Evigan, Sean Douglas, Ori Kaplan, Tamir Muskat, Tomer Yosef, and Ricky Reed; the latter is also the song's producer. The song is built around a sample from "Hermetico" by the Israeli band Balkan Beat Box from their 2007 studio album Nu Med.

A music video for "Talk Dirty" was directed by Colin Tilley, which incorporates types of dance from a variety of different cultures: it was released through Derulo's account on YouTube on August 7, 2013. Upon its release, "Talk Dirty" received mixed reviews from music critics, though was a worldwide success. The song reached the top position in Australia, Germany, Israel, and the UK, while also reaching the top 10 in Austria, Canada, Denmark, Finland, France, Hungary, Ireland, the Netherlands, New Zealand, Norway, Sweden, Switzerland, and the United States.

== Background and release ==
Producer Ricky Reed originally wrote the song for Missy Elliott. The song contains a sample of "Hermetico" by the Israeli band Balkan Beat Box from their 2007 album Nu Med. During an interview with Digital Spy, Derulo stated that the prospect of his first single with a guest appearance made him "really excited": he called "Talk Dirty" "shocking" and "out there", and felt that listeners would "be thinking 'Hmm, really?!'", but also that "it was so much fun". The song was released to digital retailers in New Zealand on August 2, 2013, with a release in Australia following on August 9: it was released in the UK on September 15, 2013. The cover artwork features the hand of Derulo's ex-girlfriend Jordin Sparks. On December 17, Derulo released the official acoustic version of the song. Following the success of the song Derulo re-recorded the song and premiered the official Spanish-language version of the single 'Háblame sucio' with returned featuring rapper 2 Chainz on February 27, 2014, and was released digitally on March 11, 2014. On March 25, 2014, Derulo released the official remix version of the song on his SoundCloud account which features 2 Chainz's original verse on the first verse, Derulo's second verse from the original version, and a new verse from rapper Sage The Gemini on the third verse.

== Composition ==
"Talk Dirty" largely refrains from the pop and electronic influences heard in Derulo's earlier eras, instead switching prominently to pop-rap and contemporary R&B, with a prominent Middle Eastern melody in the hook. The song opens and closes with a woman speaking words in broken English: Spin magazine considered this one element of an attempt to encompass an "international polyglot/clusterfuck pop atmosphere" similar to that found in the production work of Timbaland in the early 2000s. Ricky Reed's instrumentation, which contains a sample of "Hermetico" by Israeli group Balkan Beat Box, incorporates percussion as well as the "honky-horns" that back the hook, which Spin likened to those found in "Thrift Shop" by Macklemore and Ryan Lewis and "Somewhereinamerica" by Jay-Z. The song is in the F♯ minor with a Phrygian dominant scale. In mainstream pop radio, 2 Chainz's rap verse is not heard over drums' beat and replaced by a sax solo.

== Critical reception ==
James Rettig of Billboard commented Derulo for "taking [more] risks" with the song's composition than in "The Other Side", citing the horn sounds backing the chorus as an example. Spin criticized Derulo's sexualized lyrics for demonstrating "cultural ignorance", but concluded that the song as a whole "is the craziest song that could be a hit right now", in that Derulo's lyrics make those performed by 2 Chainz "appear almost tasteful". Criticizing for MSN, Kathy Iandoli described the song as "horn-heavy, splashy, braggy", and wrote that 2 Chainz's lyrics lend the song "X-rated fun" by "balancing [out] the PG-rated verses" of Derulo.

Rap-Up noted how "Talk Dirty" demonstrates a "more scandalous side" of Derulo. Kathy Iandoli's review of the song for MSN contains the subtitle "Apparently the booty speaks a universal language", based on Derulo's lyrics – which he partly speaks in a patois – claiming that even if he cannot speak the language of a foreign woman, her "booty don't need explaining", and his reference to "lipstick stamps" on his passport. DJBooth reviewer Richard quipped that "Talk Dirty" demonstrates how when Derulo "spit[s] game to beautiful women... [he] always manages to make himself understood".

== Chart performance ==
"Talk Dirty" first appeared on the New Zealand singles chart issue dated August 12, 2013, debuting at number 27: it reached its peak position of number two in its fifth week on the chart. In Australia, "Talk Dirty" debuted at number one the ARIA Singles Chart, making it Derulo's second song to do so in the country, after his 2010 single "In My Head", as well as 2 Chainz's first Australian number-one. In Europe, it topped the German Media Control Charts and reached number 7 on the Dutch Top 40 in the Netherlands, and number 1 on the Ultratop 50 chart in the Flanders region of Belgium. The single sold nearly 100,000 copies in the UK three days after its release and was predicted to reach number one. In seven days it sold nearly 160,000 copies in the UK, making it Derulo's fastest selling single within the region, and debuted at number one. This became Derulo's third number-one song in UK, after "In My Head" and "Don't Wanna Go Home", and 2 Chainz's first in the British country. "Talk Dirty" remained No. 1 on the UK Singles Chart for the second consecutive week.

In its fifth week on the Billboard Hot 100 singles chart in the United States, the song jumped nine places from fifteen to six, selling 194,000 copies. The following week the song rose to position of number 4, giving Derulo his first top 10 hit since his 2010 single, "Ridin' Solo" and fourth overall, selling an additional 234,000 copies. "Talk Dirty" has peaked at No. 3 on the Billboard Hot 100. The song also topped the Pop Songs Billboard chart, becoming his third leader on that chart after "Whatcha Say" in 2009 and "In My Head" in 2010. "Talk Dirty" reached its three million sales mark in the United States in May 2014, and 4 million October 2014. It became the sixth best-selling song of 2014 in the United States with 3.96 million copies sold in that year. It has sold 4,360,000 copies in the United States as of April 2016.

== Live performances ==
Derulo performed "Talk Dirty" for the first time, alongside an acoustic cover of his previous single "The Other Side", at the House of Blues music hall in Orlando as part of the "Presents Hook Up #4" series of concerts organized by American radio station 102 JAMZ. He also performed the song at the iHeart Radio Live Coca-Cola Summer Concert Series in July 2013. He performed the song at the Capital FM Jingle Bell Ball on December 8, 2013. Derulo performed the track live on the Australian morning show Sunrise on December 27, 2013.

Derulo performed the song live for the first time in the United States on January 23, 2014, on Jimmy Kimmel Live!, his second televised performance of the song was performed on The Arsenio Hall Show on February 6, 2014. The song's third televised performance was on the season 18 opener of the reality competition show, Dancing with the Stars, which premiered on ABC on March 17, 2014. He sang the song during iHeartRadio Album Release Party in April 2014. On July 4, 2014, Derulo performed the song on Good Morning America as part of its Summer Concert Series. On August 10, 2014, Derulo performed it at the 2014 Teen Choice Awards. Variety described the performance as a highlight of the ceremony.

== Music video ==
=== Background ===
The music video for "Talk Dirty" was directed by Colin Tilley, who also directed the videos for the previous Derulo singles "It Girl", "Breathing", "Fight for You" and "The Other Side", Filming took place on July 14, 2013. The video was released via Derulo's channel on the video sharing website YouTube on August 7, 2013. Tilley claimed that he wanted to incorporate an "international vibe" into the video, by embracing a variety of dance from different cultures: "We've got girls from different cultures that came and danced and brought out a different energy and just created this beast that was really fun and exciting."

=== Reception ===
Although Jenna Hally Rubenstein of MTV explained that the video was thematically shallow, writing that it contained "no real plot... other than "ass"... "hot babes playing saxophone" and "flexing pecs", she complimented Derulo's choreography and dancing, observing him to "[shake] it like a bawse while scoping out those hot babes playing saxophone" as he "dances and twerks around the video's many colorful sets", and quipped "The more pec-flexin', the better!"

== In popular culture ==
In February 2014, American rock band Set It Off released a cover of "Talk Dirty". British singer Chlöe Howl also covered the song at BBC Radio 1's Live Lounge. On March 16, 2014, Lifetime used the song as part of a season 2 promotion campaign for its hit dramedy Devious Maids, featuring the cast appearing alongside Derulo, who recreated the song's video and performance. In May 2014, actor Kevin Spacey and late-night talk host Jimmy Fallon did an a cappella barbershop quartet rendition of the song on The Tonight Show Starring Jimmy Fallon. Saturday Night Live has also done a parody entitled "Dongs". Canadian actress Malin Akerman performed the song on the seventh episode of Lip Sync Battle, while Jorgie Porter did the same on the UK version. Indian dance crew Desi Hoppers performed to the song in the "Duels" round of NBC's World of Dance.

YouTube released an all-star version of the song, adding celebrities such as Bow Wow, Fifth Harmony and Larry King.

== Formats and track listings ==
Digital download
No.	Title	Length
1.	"Talk Dirty" (featuring 2 Chainz)	2:57

Acoustic No-Rap Version
No.	Title	Length
1.	"Talk Dirty (Acoustic)"	2:44

== Credits and personnel ==
- Vocals – Jason Derulo, 2 Chainz
- Lyrics – Jason Derulo, Sean Douglas, Tauheed Epps, Jason Evigan, Eric Frederic, Ori Kaplan, Tamir Muskat, Tomer Yosef
- Producer – Ricky Reed
- Label – Warner Bros. Records Inc.
- A&R – Aton Ben-Horin

== Charts ==
=== Weekly charts ===
Weekly chart performance for "Talk Dirty"
Chart (2013–2014)	Peak position
Australia (ARIA)	1
Austria (Ö3 Austria Top 40)	4
Belgium (Ultratop 50 Flanders)	1
Belgium (Ultratop 50 Wallonia)	3
Brazil (Billboard Brasil Hot 100)	47
Brazil Hot Pop Songs	16
Canada Hot 100 (Billboard)	3
Czech Republic Airplay (ČNS IFPI)	14
Czech Republic Singles Digital (ČNS IFPI)	45
Denmark (Tracklisten)	7
Euro Digital Songs (Billboard)	1
Finland (Suomen virallinen lista)	6
Finland Airplay (Radiosoittolista)	24
France (SNEP)	3
Germany (GfK)	1
Greece Digital Songs (Billboard)	2
Hungary (Dance Top 40)	7
Hungary (Rádiós Top 40)	8
Hungary (Single Top 40)	13
Ireland (IRMA)	2
Italy (FIMI)	12
Israel (Media Forest)	1
Netherlands (Dutch Top 40)	5
Netherlands (Single Top 100)	5
New Zealand (Recorded Music NZ)	2
Norway (VG-lista)	7
Poland Airplay (ZPAV)	11
Poland Dance (ZPAV)	21
Romania Airplay (Media Forest)	1
Scottish Singles Sales (Official Charts)	1
Slovakia Airplay (ČNS IFPI)	26
Spain (Promusicae)	13
Sweden (Sverigetopplistan)	5
Switzerland (Schweizer Hitparade)	4
UK Singles (Official Charts)	1
UK Hip Hop/R&B (Official Charts)	1
US Billboard Hot 100	3
US Hot R&B/Hip-Hop Songs (Billboard)	2
US Adult Pop Airplay (Billboard)	22
US Dance Club Songs (Billboard)	17
US Pop Airplay (Billboard)	1
US Rhythmic Airplay (Billboard)	1

=== Year-end charts ===
Annual chart rankings for "Talk Dirty"
Chart (2013)	Position
Australia (ARIA)	13
Austria (Ö3 Austria Top 40)	48
Belgium (Ultratop Flanders)	25
Belgium (Ultratop Wallonia)	47
France (SNEP)	60
Germany (Official German Charts)	33
Hungary (Dance Top 40)	52
Italy (Musica e dischi)	74
Netherlands (Dutch Top 40)	24
Netherlands (Single Top 100)	22
New Zealand (Recorded Music NZ)	23
Sweden (Sverigetopplistan)	82
Switzerland (Schweizer Hitparade)	60
UK Singles (Official Charts Company)	25

Chart (2014)	Position
Belgium Urban (Ultratop Flanders)	21
Brazil (Crowley)	90
Canada (Canadian Hot 100)	19
France (SNEP)	110
Hungary (Dance Top 40)	7
Italy (FIMI)	58
US Billboard Hot 100	6
US Hot R&B/Hip-Hop Songs (Billboard)	4
US Mainstream Top 40 (Billboard)	5
US Rhythmic (Billboard)	8

== Certifications ==
Region	Certification	Certified units/sales
Australia (ARIA)	7× Platinum	490,000^{‡}
Austria (IFPI Austria)	Gold	15,000^{*}
Belgium (BRMA)	Gold	15,000^{*}
Canada (Music Canada)	5× Platinum	400,000^{‡}
Germany (BVMI)	Platinum	300,000^{^}
Italy (FIMI)	2× Platinum	60,000^{‡}
Mexico (AMPROFON)	Gold	30,000^{*}
New Zealand (RMNZ)	3× Platinum	90,000^{‡}
Norway (IFPI Norway)	6× Platinum	60,000^{‡}
Spain (Promusicae)	Platinum	60,000^{‡}
Sweden (GLF)	2× Platinum	80,000^{‡}
Switzerland (IFPI Switzerland)	Platinum	30,000^{^}
United Kingdom (BPI)	2× Platinum	1,200,000^{‡}
United States (RIAA)	4× Platinum	4,000,000^{‡}
Streaming
Denmark (IFPI Danmark)	3× Platinum	5,400,000^{†}
Spain (Promusicae)	Platinum	8,000,000^{†}
^{*} Sales figures based on certification alone.^{^} Shipments figures based on certification alone.^{‡} Sales+streaming figures based on certification alone.^{†} Streaming-only figures based on certification alone.

== Release history ==
Region	Date	Format	Label
New Zealand	August 2, 2013	Digital download	Beluga Heights; Warner Bros
Australia	August 9, 2013	Digital download	Beluga Heights; Warner Bros
United Kingdom	September 15, 2013	Digital download	Beluga Heights; Warner Bros
United States	January 7, 2014	Mainstream radio	Beluga Heights; Warner Bros
United States	January 7, 2014	Rhythmic contemporary radio	Beluga Heights; Warner Bros
