= Beluga Heights Records =

- Parent company: Cinq Music Group
- Founded: 2006
- Founder: J. R. Rotem, President; Zach Katz, CEO, Tommy Rotem, A&R
- Distributor: Cinq Music Group
- Genre: Various
- Country of origin: US
- Location: Los Angeles, California
- Official website: www.belugaheights.com

Beluga Heights Records is an American record label established by record producer J. R. Rotem. The label is known for discovering and developing Sean Kingston, Iyaz, Mann, and Jason Derulo.

In September 2020, Beluga Heights was acquired by Cinq Music Group.

== History ==
The Beluga Heights label was founded in November 2006 as an equal three-way partnership between Rotem, his manager Zach Katz and his brother Tommy Rotem with Epic Records to help develop new artists signed to the label. In August 2008, Beluga Heights moved to a new joint venture with Warner Bros. Records, where Jason Derulo, Auburn, and Iyaz were signed to the record label. The "Beluga Heights" phrase is commonly found at the start of songs produced by the record label. Beluga Heights is also housed in the Chalice Recording Studios in Los Angeles.

=== Artists ===
- Sean Kingston (Epic / Beluga Heights)
- Jason Derulo (Warner Bros. / Beluga Heights)
- Iyaz (Warner Bros./Reprise/Beluga Heights)

=== Staff ===
- J.R. Rotem – president / record producer / songwriter
- Zach Katz – CEO / record manager / legal
- Tommy Rotem – Vice president of A&R / artist development
- Frisco Lopez – Vice president of A&R

=== Producers and writers ===
- J. R. Rotem – producer and the founder of Beluga Heights Records
- Evan "Kidd" Bogart – songwriter of Beluga Heights Records and founder of his own label "The Writing Camp"
- D. A. Doman - co-publishing producer
- Jonathan Brown – songwriter
- Clemm Rishad – songwriter
- William Jordan – songwriter
- Kevin Hissink – songwriter
- Mike Mac – songwriter
- Jordan Baum - songwriter
- Travis Margis - songwriter
- Samantha Nelson - songwriter
- Lolene Everett - Songwriter
- Thomas Louis - Songwriter

== Discography ==
Year	Artist	Album
2007	Sean Kingston	Sean Kingston
2009	Sean Kingston	Tomorrow
2010	The Ready Set	I'm Alive, I'm Dreaming
2010	Jason Derulo	Jason Derulo
2010	Iyaz	Replay
2011	Mann	Mann's World
2011	Jason Derulo	Future History
2013	Sean Kingston	Back 2 Life
2013	Jason Derulo	Tattoos
2014	Jason Derulo	Talk Dirty
2015	Jason Derulo	Everything Is 4
2020	Jason Derulo	2Sides
