= Jason Derulo discography =

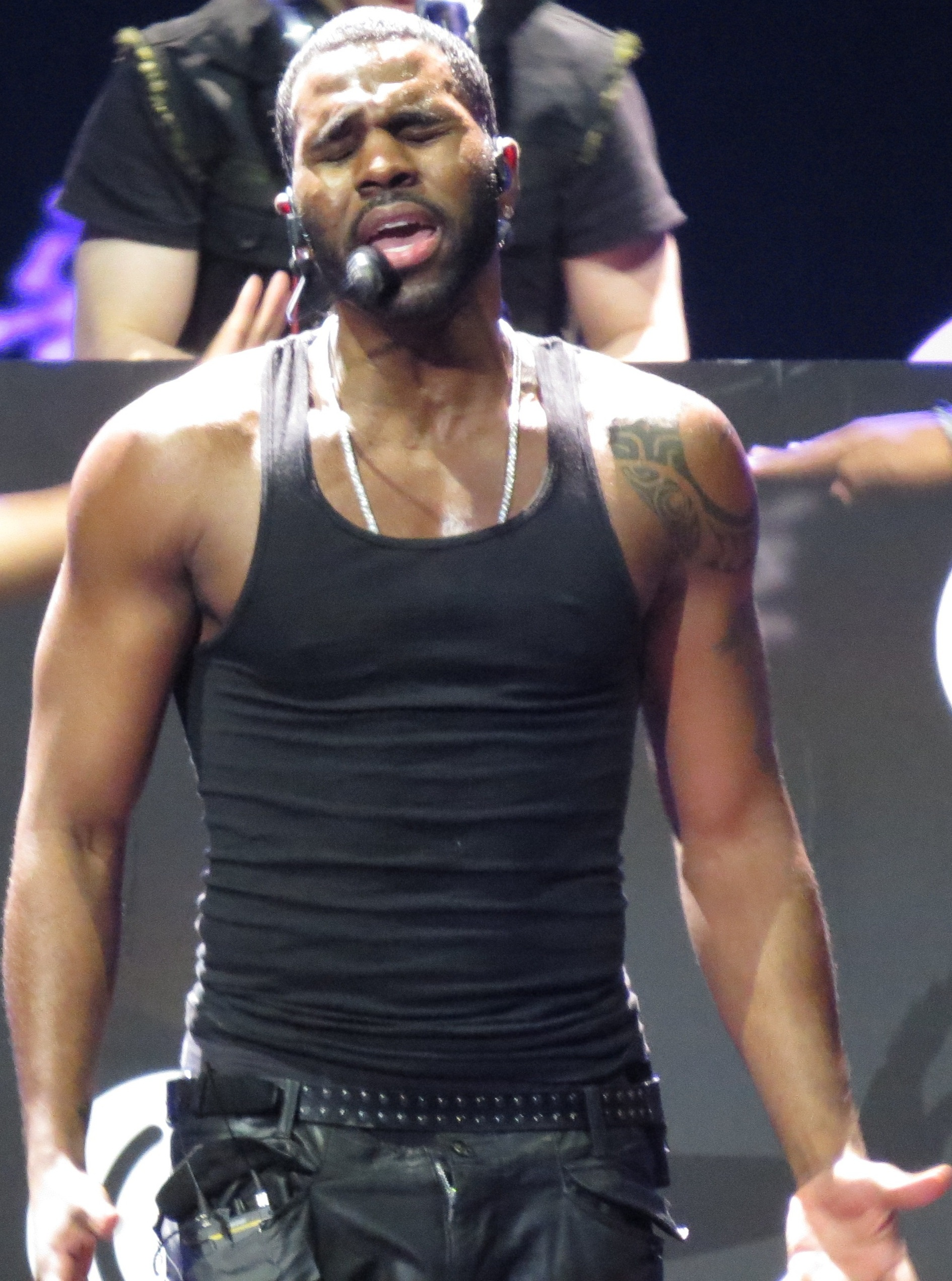
- Derulo performing in 2013
- Studio albums: 5
- Extended plays: 6
- Compilation albums: 2
- Singles: 59
- Music videos: 37
- Promotional singles: 6

American singer and songwriter Jason Derulo has released five studio albums, one re-issued album, two compilation albums, six extended plays, 59 singles (including 14 as a featured artist), six promotional singles, and 37 music videos (including six as a featured artist). Before Derulo established himself as a solo artist, he wrote songs for many artists, including Lil Wayne, Pitbull, Pleasure P and Cassie. He also wrote "Bossy" for rapper Birdman, and made a guest appearance on the song.

After signing with Beluga Heights Records, Derulo released his debut single "Whatcha Say" in May 2009. It reached number one on the Billboard Hot 100 and was certified triple platinum by the Recording Industry Association of America (RIAA). The song served as the lead single from Derulo's self-titled debut studio album, which was released on March 2, 2010, and reached number 11 on the Billboard 200. "In My Head" and "Ridin' Solo" were released as the album's second and third singles respectively. While both attained peaks within the top 10 in multiple countries, "In My Head" became Derulo's first number-one single in the likes of Australia and the United Kingdom. A further two singles were released from the album: "What If" and "The Sky's the Limit".

Derulo's second studio album Future History was released on September 16, 2011. Lead single "Don't Wanna Go Home" preceded its release in May 2011; where it became the artist's second number-one single in the United Kingdom. the second single taken from the album, "It Girl" also achieved success, reaching the top five in Australia, New Zealand and the United Kingdom. "Breathing" and "Fight for You" were also released from the album in 2011; with both attaining top 10 peaks in Australia. In May 2012, Derulo released "Undefeated" as the first and only single from the re-release of Future History. Despite managing to reach number 14 in Australia, "Undefeated" performed poorly on the Billboard Hot 100, reaching number 90 and failing to chart altogether in the United Kingdom.

In April 2013, Derulo unveiled the lead single from his third studio album; Tattoos, "The Other Side" saw Derulo return to the top five in Canada for the first time since 2009, reaching number 17 in the United States and the top five in Australia and the United Kingdom. Derulo's third studio album in the US, Talk Dirty, outsold his previous best debut Jason Derulo and included two top 10 platinum singles: "Talk Dirty" and "Wiggle". As of 2015, Derulo has sold 28 million albums and songs combined in the US.

Derulo released his fourth album Everything Is 4 in May 2015. It produced the worldwide hit single "Want to Want Me", which peaked at number 5 on the Billboard Hot 100 and topped the UK Singles Chart for four weeks.

In 2020, Derulo's single "Savage Love (Laxed – Siren Beat)" peaked at number one on the Billboard Hot 100, marking his first top 10 hit in five years.

== Albums ==
=== Studio albums ===
List of studio albums, with selected chart positions, sales figures and certifications
| Title | Album details | Peak chart positions | | | | | | | | | | Sales | Certifications |
| Title | Album details | US | AUS | AUT | CAN | GER | IRL | NZ | SWE | SWI | UK | Sales | Certifications |
|---|---|---|---|---|---|---|---|---|---|---|---|---|---|
| Jason Derulo | Released: February 26, 2010 (US); Labels: Beluga Heights, Warner Bros., Asylum; Formats: CD, digital download | 11 | 4 | 23 | 9 | 49 | 10 | 5 | 59 | 13 | 8 | US: 315,000 | RIAA: Platinum; ARIA: Platinum; BPI: Platinum; GLF: Platinum; IRMA: Gold; MC: Platinum; RMNZ: Platinum |
| Future History | Released: September 16, 2011 (US); Labels: Beluga Heights, Warner Bros.; Formats: CD, digital download | 29 | 9 | 38 | 54 | 32 | 18 | 6 | — | 20 | 7 | US: 74,000 | RIAA: Gold; ARIA: Platinum; BPI: Gold; MC: Gold; RMNZ: Gold |
| Tattoos | Released: September 20, 2013 (UK); Labels: Beluga Heights, Warner Bros.; Formats: CD, digital download | — | 5 | 29 | — | 25 | 14 | 10 | 7 | 13 | 5 | | ARIA: Platinum; BPI: Gold; BVMI: Gold; GLF: Gold; MC: Platinum; RMNZ: Platinum |
| Everything Is 4 | Released: June 2, 2015 (US); Labels: Beluga Heights, Warner Bros.; Formats: CD, digital download | 4 | 12 | 33 | 10 | 23 | 30 | 20 | 3 | 13 | 16 | US: 80,000 | RIAA: Gold; BPI: Silver; GLF: Gold; MC: Platinum; RMNZ: Platinum |
| Nu King | Released: February 16, 2024 (US); Label: Atlantic; Formats: CD, digital download | 82 | — | — | 58 | — | — | — | — | 93 | 69 | | RIAA: Gold; BPI: Silver; MC: Platinum |
"—" denotes releases that did not chart or were not released in that territory.

=== Re-issued albums ===
List of re-issued albums, with selected chart positions, sales figures and certifications
| Title | Album details | Peak chart positions | | Sales | Certifications |
| Title | Album details | US | FRA | Sales | Certifications |
|---|---|---|---|---|---|
| Talk Dirty | Released: April 15, 2014 (US); Labels: Beluga Heights, Warner Bros.; Formats: CD, digital download | 4 | 199 | US: 245,000 | RIAA: Platinum |

=== Compilation albums ===
List of compilation albums
| Title | Album details | Peak chart positions | | | | Certifications |
| Title | Album details | US | AUS | IRL | UK | Certifications |
|---|---|---|---|---|---|---|
| Reloaded | Released: December 16, 2011 (US); Labels: Beluga Heights, Warner Bros.; Format: Digital download | — | — | — | — | |
| Platinum Hits | Released: July 29, 2016; Labels: Beluga Heights, Warner Bros.; Formats: CD, digital download | 68 | 45 | 43 | 46 | BPI: 2× Platinum |

== Extended plays ==
List of extended plays
| Title | EP details |
|---|---|
| Ridin' Solo EP | Released: 2010; Labels: Warner Bros.; Format: Digital download |
| Jason Derulo: Special Edition | Released: July 1, 2011 (US); Labels: Beluga Heights, Warner Bros.; Format: Digital download |
| Tattoos | Released: September 24, 2013 (US); Labels: Beluga Heights, Warner Bros.; Format: Digital download |
| Talk Dirty | Released: April 21, 2014 (FRA); Labels: Beluga Heights, Warner Bros.; Format: Digital download |
| 2Sides (Side 1) | Released: November 8, 2019 (US); Labels: Beluga Heights, Warner; Formats: Digital download, streaming |
| The Last Dance (Part 1) | Released: January 23, 2026; Labels: Creative Genius; Formats: Digital download streaming |

== Singles ==
=== As lead artist ===
List of singles as lead artist, with selected chart positions and certifications, showing year released and album name
| Title | Year | Peak chart positions | | | | | | | | | | Certifications | Album |
| Title | Year | US | AUS | AUT | CAN | GER | IRL | NZ | SWE | SWI | UK | Certifications | Album |
|---|---|---|---|---|---|---|---|---|---|---|---|---|---|
| "Whatcha Say" | 2009 | 1 | 5 | 9 | 3 | 7 | 5 | 1 | 4 | 5 | 3 | RIAA: 5× Platinum; ARIA: 4× Platinum; BPI: 2× Platinum; BVMI: Gold; IFPI AUT: Gold; MC: 4× Platinum; RMNZ: 3× Platinum | Jason Derulo |
| "In My Head" | 2009 | 5 | 1 | 15 | 2 | 9 | 3 | 2 | 13 | 20 | 1 | RIAA: 4× Platinum; ARIA: 7× Platinum; BPI: Platinum; BVMI: Gold; IFPI AUT: Gold; MC: 3× Platinum; RMNZ: 2× Platinum | Jason Derulo |
| "Ridin' Solo" | 2010 | 9 | 4 | 36 | 19 | 24 | 4 | 12 | — | 45 | 2 | RIAA: 4× Platinum; ARIA: 5× Platinum; BPI: 2× Platinum; MC: Platinum; RMNZ: 2× Platinum | Jason Derulo |
| "What If" | 2010 | 76 | 32 | 35 | — | 48 | 16 | 27 | — | — | 12 | BPI: Silver | Jason Derulo |
| "The Sky's the Limit" | 2010 | — | 22 | — | — | — | — | 31 | — | — | 68 | ARIA: Platinum | Jason Derulo |
| "Don't Wanna Go Home" | 2011 | 14 | 5 | 8 | 8 | 11 | 8 | 17 | 37 | 18 | 1 | RIAA: Platinum; ARIA: 5× Platinum; BPI: Platinum; BVMI: Gold; IFPI AUT: Gold; IFPI SWI: Gold; MC: Platinum | Future History |
| "It Girl" | 2011 | 17 | 3 | 34 | 34 | 23 | 3 | 3 | 35 | 30 | 4 | RIAA: Platinum; ARIA: 6× Platinum; BPI: Platinum; RMNZ: 2× Platinum | Future History |
| "Breathing" | 2011 | — (Note: "Breathing" did not enter the Billboard Hot 100, but peaked at number 12 on the Bubbling Under Hot 100 Singles chart.) | 9 | 8 | — | 5 | 19 | 28 | — | 7 | 25 | ARIA: 2× Platinum; BVMI: Gold; IFPI AUT: Gold; IFPI SWI: Gold | Future History |
| "Fight for You" | 2011 | 83 | 5 | — | — | — | 28 | — | — | — | 15 | ARIA: 3× Platinum; BPI: Silver | Future History |
| "Undefeated" | 2012 | 90 | 14 | — | — | — | 35 | 26 | — | — | — | ARIA: Gold | Future History |
| "Pick Up the Pieces" | 2012 | — | 37 | — | — | — | — | — | — | — | — | | Future History |
| "The Other Side" | 2013 | 18 | 4 | 30 | 5 | 35 | 4 | 12 | 49 | 19 | 2 | RIAA: Platinum; ARIA: 3× Platinum; BPI: Platinum; GLF: Gold; MC: Platinum; RMNZ: Platinum | Tattoos |
| "Talk Dirty" (featuring 2 Chainz) | 2013 | 3 | 1 | 4 | 3 | 1 | 2 | 2 | 5 | 4 | 1 | RIAA: 4× Platinum; ARIA: 7× Platinum; BPI: 2× Platinum; BVMI: Platinum; GLF: 2× Platinum; IFPI AUT: Gold; IFPI SWI: Platinum; MC: 5× Platinum; RMNZ: 3× Platinum | Tattoos |
| "Marry Me" | 2013 | 26 | 8 | 27 | 37 | 57 | — | 14 | — | 40 | 52 | RIAA: Platinum; ARIA: 3× Platinum; BPI: Silver; MC: Gold; RMNZ: Platinum | Tattoos |
| "Trumpets" | 2013 | 14 | 1 | 33 | 38 | 30 | 5 | 3 | 25 | 43 | 4 | RIAA: 2× Platinum; ARIA: 7× Platinum; BPI: 2× Platinum; BVMI: Gold; GLF: Gold; IFPI SWI: Platinum; MC: Platinum; RMNZ: 3× Platinum | Tattoos |
| "Stupid Love" | 2014 | — | 17 | — | — | — | 95 | — | — | — | 54 | ARIA: Platinum | Tattoos |
| "Wiggle" (featuring Snoop Dogg) | 2014 | 5 | 3 | 4 | 14 | 6 | 9 | 9 | 5 | 8 | 8 | RIAA: 3× Platinum; ARIA: 3× Platinum; BPI: Platinum; BVMI: Gold; IFPI AUT: Gold; IFPI SWI: Gold; MC: 2× Platinum; RMNZ: Platinum | Tattoos |
| "Bubblegum" (Note: "Bubblegum" was only released as a single in Australia.) (featuring Tyga) | 2014 | — | 38 | — | — | — | — | — | — | — | — | | Tattoos |
| "Want to Want Me" | 2015 | 5 | 4 | 1 | 5 | 2 | 4 | 3 | 13 | 3 | 1 | RIAA: 4× Platinum; ARIA: 5× Platinum; BPI: 3× Platinum; BVMI: 3× Gold; GLF: 3× Platinum; IFPI AUT: Gold; IFPI SWI: Platinum; MC: 5× Platinum; RMNZ: 3× Platinum | Everything Is 4 |
| "Cheyenne" | 2015 | 66 | 25 | — | 42 | — | 85 | — | — | — | 184 | ARIA: Platinum | Everything Is 4 |
| "Try Me" (featuring Jennifer Lopez and Matoma) | 2015 | — | — | 22 | — | 39 | — | — | 35 | — | 113 | BVMI: Gold; GLF: Gold; RMNZ: Gold | Everything Is 4 |
| "Get Ugly" | 2015 | 52 | 77 | — | 65 | 38 | 28 | — (Note: "Get Ugly" did not enter the NZ Top 40 Singles Chart, but peaked at number three, on the NZ Heatseeker Singles Chart.) | — | — | 12 | RIAA: Gold; ARIA: Platinum; BPI: Platinum; BVMI: Gold; RMNZ: Gold | Everything Is 4 |
| "Naked" | 2016 | — | — | — | — | — | — | — | — | — | — | | Non-album singles |
| "If It Ain't Love" | 2016 | 67 | 34 | — | 37 | 80 | 35 | — | 44 | 58 | 49 | ARIA: Platinum; BPI: Silver; RMNZ: Gold | Non-album singles |
| "Kiss the Sky" | 2016 | — | — | — | — | — | — | — (Note: "Kiss the Sky" did not enter the NZ Top 40 Singles Chart, but peaked at number 9, on the NZ Heatseeker Singles Chart.) | — | — | 87 | | Platinum Hits |
| "Swalla" (featuring Nicki Minaj and Ty Dolla $ign) | 2017 | 29 | 17 | 9 | 15 | 4 | 9 | 7 | 8 | 14 | 6 | RIAA: 2× Platinum; ARIA: 3× Platinum; BPI: 2× Platinum; BVMI: 2× Platinum; IFPI AUT: 2× Platinum; MC: 6× Platinum; RMNZ: 4× Platinum | Nu King |
| "If I'm Lucky" | 2017 | — | 59 | 39 | 75 | 31 | 45 | — (Note: "If I'm Lucky" did not enter the NZ Top 40 Singles Chart, but peaked at number one on the NZ Heatseeker Singles Chart.) | 54 | 77 | 28 | BPI: Silver; BVMI: Gold; RMNZ: Platinum | Non-album single |
| "Tip Toe" (featuring French Montana) | 2017 | — | 81 | 25 | 39 | 11 | 12 | — (Note: "Tip Toe" did not enter the NZ Top 40 Singles Chart, but peaked at number one on the NZ Heatseeker Singles Chart.) | 66 | 22 | 5 | RIAA: Gold; ARIA: Gold; BPI: Platinum; BVMI: Platinum; IFPI AUT: Platinum; MC: 2× Platinum; RMNZ: Platinum | Nu King |
| "Colors" (solo or with Maluma) | 2018 | — | — | 57 | — | 47 | 44 | — | — (Note: "Colors" did not enter the Swedish Singellista Chart, but peaked at number 10 on the Swedish Heatseeker Chart.) | 63 | 64 | BPI: Silver | 2018 FIFA World Cup; Official Anthem |
| "Goodbye" (with David Guetta featuring Nicki Minaj and Willy William) | 2018 | — (Note: "Goodbye" did not enter the Billboard Hot 100, but peaked at number seven on the Bubbling Under Hot 100 Singles chart.) | 33 | 57 | 68 | 47 | 21 | — (Note: "Goodbye" did not enter the NZ Top 40 Singles Chart, but peaked at number seven on the NZ Hot Singles Chart.) | 16 | 50 | 26 | BPI: Gold; ARIA: Platinum; IFPI AUT: Gold; MC: Platinum; RMNZ: Gold | 7 |
| "Make Up" (with Vice featuring Ava Max) | 2018 | — | — | — | — | — | — | — (Note: "Make Up" did not enter the NZ Top 40 Singles Chart, but peaked at number 40 on the NZ Hot Singles Chart.) | — | — | — | | Non-album singles |
| "Let's Shut Up & Dance" (with Lay and NCT 127) | 2019 | — | — | — | — | — | — | — (Note: "Let's Shut Up & Dance" did not enter the NZ Top 40 Singles Chart, but peaked at number 34 on the NZ Hot Singles Chart.) | — | — | — | | Non-album singles |
| "Mamacita" (featuring Farruko) | 2019 | — | — | — | — | — | — | — (Note: "Mamacita" did not enter the NZ Top 40 Singles Chart, but peaked at number 31 on the NZ Hot Singles Chart.) | — | — | — | | Non-album singles |
| "Too Hot" | 2019 | — | — | — | — | — | — | — | — | — | — | | Non-album singles |
| "Savage Love (Laxed – Siren Beat)" (with Jawsh 685) (Note: This song also received a remix with South Korean boy band BTS.) | 2020 | 1 | 1 | 1 | 1 | 1 | 1 | 1 | 1 | 1 | 1 | RIAA: 4× Platinum; ARIA: 5× Platinum; BPI: 2× Platinum; BVMI: 2× Platinum; GLF: 2× Platinum; IFPI AUT: 3× Platinum; IFPI SWI: 2× Platinum; MC: 4× Platinum; RMNZ: 5× Platinum | Non-album singles |
| "Coño" (with Puri and Jhorrmountain) | 2020 | — | — | 42 | — | 47 | 82 | — | — | 74 | 55 | BPI: Silver; IFPI AUT: Gold; MC: Gold | Non-album singles |
| "Don't Cry for Me" (with Alok and Martin Jensen) | 2020 | — | — | — | — | — | — | — | 91 | 90 | — | | Non-album singles |
| "Take You Dancing" | 2020 | 57 | 10 | 12 | 49 | 15 | 7 | 13 | 26 | 11 | 7 | RIAA: Platinum; ARIA: 4× Platinum; BPI: Platinum; BVMI: Platinum; IFPI AUT: 2× Platinum; MC: 4× Platinum; RMNZ: 2× Platinum | Nu King |
| "Love Not War (The Tampa Beat)" (with Nuka) | 2020 | — | 49 | 14 | 92 | 9 | 43 | — | 97 | 5 | 26 | ARIA: Platinum; BPI: Silver; BVMI: Platinum; IFPI AUT: 2× Platinum; IFPI SWI: Platinum; MC: Platinum; RMNZ: Gold | Nu King |
| "Lifestyle" (featuring Adam Levine) | 2021 | 71 | — | — | 54 | — | 92 | — (Note: "Lifestyle" did not enter the NZ Top 40 Singles Chart, but peaked at number four on the NZ Hot Singles Chart.) | 74 | 66 | 70 | MC: Platinum | Nu King |
| "Jalebi Baby" (Remix) (with Tesher) | 2021 | — | — | 73 | 36 | 81 | — | — | — | 71 | — | MC: 2× Platinum | Nu King |
| "Acapulco" | 2021 | — | 30 | 9 | 54 | 18 | 51 | — (Note: "Acapulco" did not enter the NZ Top 40 Singles Chart, but peaked at number 11 on the NZ Hot Singles Chart.) | — (Note: "Acapulco" did not enter the Swedish Singellista Chart, but peaked at number one on the Swedish Heatseeker Chart.) | 27 | 65 | ARIA: Platinum; BPI: Silver; BVMI: Platinum; IFPI AUT: 3× Platinum; MC: 2× Platinum; RMNZ: Gold | Nu King |
| "Ayo Girl (Fayahh Beat)" (with Robinson featuring Rema) | 2022 | — | — | — | — | — | — | — | — | — | — | | Nu King |
| "Slidin'" (featuring Kodak Black) | 2022 | — | — | — | — | — | — | — (Note: "Slidin'" did not enter the NZ Top 40 Singles Chart, but peaked at number 28 on the NZ Hot Singles Chart.) | — | — | — | | Non-album singles |
| "No No No" (with Tayc) | 2022 | — | — | — | — | — | — | — | — | — | — | | Non-album singles |
| "Never Let You Go" (with Shouse) | 2022 | — | — | — | — | — | — | — (Note: "Never Let You Go" did not enter the NZ Top 40 Singles Chart, but peaked at number 26 on the NZ Hot Singles Chart.) | — | — | — | | Non-album singles |
| "Saturday/Sunday" (with David Guetta) | 2023 | — | — | — | — | — | — | — | — | — | — | | Non-album singles |
| "It's Your Thing" | 2023 | — | — | — | — | — | — | — | — | — | — | | Spinning Gold |
| "Ta Ta Ta" (with Bayanni) | 2023 | — | — | — | — | — | — | — | — | — | — | | Non-album singles |
| "Glad U Came" | 2023 | — | — | — | — | — | — | — | — | — | — | | Non-album singles |
| "When Love Sucks" (featuring Dido) | 2023 | — | — | — | — | — | — | — | — | — | — | | Nu King |
| "Slow Low" | 2023 | — | — | — | — | — | — | — | — | — | — | | Nu King |
| "Body Count" | 2023 | — | — | — | — | — | — | — | — | — | — | | Non-album single |
| "Hands on Me" (featuring Meghan Trainor) | 2023 | — | — | — | — | — | — | — (Note: "Hands on Me" did not enter the NZ Top 40 Singles Chart, but peaked at number 20 on the NZ Hot Singles Chart.) | — | — | — | | Nu King |
| "Closer to Christmas" | 2023 | — | — | — | — | 70 | — | — | — | — | — | | Non-album singles |
| "Il y a" (with Amir) | 2023 | — | — | — | — | — | — | — | — | — | — | | Non-album singles |
| "Spicy Margarita" (with Michael Bublé or featuring María Becerra) | 2024 | — | — | — | — | — | — | — (Note: "Spicy Margarita" did not enter the NZ Top 40 Singles Chart, but peaked at number 16 on the NZ Hot Singles Chart.) | — | — | 80 | | Nu King |
| "Animal" (with R3hab) | 2024 | — | — | — | — | — | — | — | — | — | — | | Non-album singles |
| "Bumpa" (with King) | 2024 | — | — | — | — | — | — | — | — | — | — | | Non-album singles |
| "From the Islands" (with фрози (Frozy) and Tomo) | 2024 | — | — | — | — | — | — | — | — | — | — | | Non-album singles |
| "Morning" (with Cheat Codes featuring De La Ghetto and Galantis) | 2024 | — | — | — | — | — | — | — | — | — | — | | Non-album singles |
| "Tonight (D.I.Y.A)" (with Jax Jones and Joel Corry) | 2024 | — | — | — | — | — | — | — | — | — | — | | Non-album singles |
| "Make Me Happy" (with Jawsh 685) | 2024 | — | — | — | — | — | — | — (Note: "Make Me Happy" did not enter the NZ Top 40 Singles Chart, but peaked at number seven on the NZ Hot Singles Chart.) | — | — | — | | Non-album singles |
| "Snake" (with Nora Fatehi) | 2025 | — | — | — | — | — | — | — | — | — | — | | Non-album singles |
| "You DJ, I'll Drive" | 2025 | — | — | — | — | — | — | — | — | — | — | | The Last Dance (Part 1) |
| "Who Hurt You" | 2025 | — | — | — | — | — | — | — | — | — | — | | The Last Dance (Part 1) |
| "Miracle" | 2025 | — | — | — | — | — | — | — | — | — | — | | Non-album single |
| "Privacy" (with Pitbull) | 2026 | — | — | — | — | — | — | — | — | — | — | | Pitcoin |
| "Delete Me" (with Lovixx and Blanka) | 2026 | — | — | — | — | — | — | — | — | — | — | | Non-album single |
"—" denotes a recording that did not chart or was not released in that territory.

=== As featured artist ===
List of singles as featured artist, with selected chart positions and certifications, showing year released and album name
| Title | Year | Peak chart positions | | | | | | | | | Certifications | Album |
| Title | Year | US | AUS | CAN | IRL | NLD | NZ | SPA | SWI | UK | Certifications | Album |
|---|---|---|---|---|---|---|---|---|---|---|---|---|
| "Text" (Mann featuring Jason Derulo) | 2010 | — | — | — | — | — | — | — | — | — | | Mann's World |
| "Take You Anywhere" (Shortyo featuring Jason Derulo) | 2010 | — | — | — | — | — | — | — | — | — | | Father Forgive Me |
| "Test Drive" (Jin Akanishi featuring Jason Derulo) | 2011 | — | — | — | — | — | — | — | — | — | | Non-album singles |
| "Make a Move" (Tiffany Queen featuring Jason Derulo) | 2013 | — | — | — | — | — | — | — | — | — | | Non-album singles |
| "This Is How We Roll" (Remix) (Florida Georgia Line featuring Jason Derulo and Luke Bryan) | 2014 | — | — | — | — | — | — | — | — | — | | Non-album singles |
| "Chingalinga" (Alyxx Dione featuring Jason Derulo) | 2015 | — | — | — | — | — | — | — | — | — | | Non-album singles |
| "Follow Me" (Hardwell featuring Jason Derulo) | 2015 | — | 26 | — | — | 84 | — | — | — | — | ARIA: Gold | United We Are |
| "Drive You Crazy" (Pitbull featuring Jason Derulo and Juicy J) | 2015 | — | — | — | — | — | — | — | — | — | | Globalization |
| "Secret Love Song" (Little Mix featuring Jason Derulo) | 2016 | — | 16 | — | 11 | — | 18 | — | — | 6 | ARIA: 2× Platinum; BPI: 3× Platinum; IRMA: Platinum; RMNZ: 3× Platinum | Get Weird |
| "Hello Friday" (Flo Rida featuring Jason Derulo) | 2016 | 79 | 36 | — | — | — | — | — | — | 198 | | Non-album singles |
| "Hands" (among Artists for Orlando) | 2016 | — | — | — | — | — | — | — | — | — | | Non-album singles |
| "1, 2, 3" (Sofía Reyes featuring Jason Derulo and De La Ghetto) | 2018 | — | — | — | — | 95 | — | 5 | 63 | — | RIAA: 9× Platinum (Latin); PROMUSICAE: 2× Platinum | Mal de Amores |
| "Jiggle Jiggle" (Duke & Jones and Louis Theroux featuring Jason Derulo and Amelia Dimz) | 2022 | — | — | — | — | — | — | — | — | — | | Non-album single |
| "Give You Love" (Jessica Mauboy featuring Jason Derulo) | 2023 | — | 74 | — | — | — | — | — | — | — | ARIA: Gold | Yours Forever |
| "Lemons" (Dylan and the Moon featuring Jason Derulo) | 2023 | — | — | — | — | — | — | — | — | — | | Non-album singles |
| "Do It Better" (Yung Q featuring Jason Derulo) | 2025 | — | — | — | — | — | — | — | — | — | | Non-album singles |
| "Mi Chico" (DJ Goja featuring Jason Derulo and Melody) | 2026 | — (Note: "Mi Chico" did not enter the Billboard Hot 100, but peaked at number 15 on the Bubbling Under Hot 100 chart.) | — | 53 | 41 | — | — | — | — | 25 | | Non-album singles |
"—" denotes a recording that did not chart or was not released in that territory.

=== Promotional singles ===
List of promotional singles, with selected chart positions, showing year released and album name
| Title | Year | Peak chart positions | Album |
| Title | Year | NZ Heat. | Album |
|---|---|---|---|
| "That's My Shhh" | 2011 | — | Future History |
| "Make It Up as We Go" | 2011 | — | Future History |
| "Cyberlove" (featuring Mims) | 2013 | — | Non-album single |
| "Champion" (featuring Tia Ray) | 2019 | — | Official Song of the FIBA Basketball World Cup China 2019 |
"—" denotes a recording that did not chart or was not released in that territory.

== Other charted songs ==
List of songs, with selected chart positions, showing year released and album name
| Title | Year | Peak chart positions | | | | | | | Album or EP |
| Title | Year | US Dance | GER | NZ Hot | ROU Air. | SWE Heat. | SWI | UK | Album or EP |
|---|---|---|---|---|---|---|---|---|---|
| "Coming Home" (Pixie Lott featuring Jason Derulo) | 2010 | — | — | — | — | — | — | 51 | Turn It Up Louder |
| "Fire" (featuring Pitbull) | 2013 | — | 91 | — | — | — | 73 | 162 | Tattoos |
| "F It Up" | 2019 | — | — | 34 | — | — | — | — | 2Sides (Side 1) |
| "Down" (with David Guetta) | 2024 | 17 | — | 26 | — | 14 | — | — | Nu King |
| "Sexy for Me" | 2026 | — | — | — | 26 | — | — | — | The Last Dance (Part 1) |
| "Complicated" (with Inna) | 2026 | — | — | — | 28 | — | — | — | The Last Dance (Part 1) |
"—" denotes a recording that did not chart or was not released in that territory.

== Guest appearances ==
List of non-single guest appearances, with other performing artists, showing year released and album name
| Title | Year | Other artist(s) | Album |
|---|---|---|---|
| "My Life" | 2007 | Pitbull | The Boatlift |
| "Bossy" | 2007 | Birdman | 5 * Stunna |
| "Twisted" | 2008 | Nu Jersey Devil, Stacks | Free Game |
| "Coming Home" | 2009 | Pixie Lott | Turn It Up Louder |
| "Text" | 2010 | Mann | Mann's World |
| "Together" | 2011 | Demi Lovato | Unbroken |
| "That Ohh Ohh" | 2012 | Shortyo | Father Forgive Me |
| "Body Talk" | 2012 | Nayer, Afrojack | Unknown album |
| "Drive You Crazy" | 2014 | Pitbull, Juicy J | Globalization |
| "Can You Feel the Love Tonight" | 2015 | none | We Love Disney |
| "If I Ever Fall in Love" | 2015 | Pentatonix | Pentatonix |
| "Make the Bed" | 2016 | K. Michelle | More Issues Than Vogue |
| "Baby You" | 2016 | The Game | 1992 |
| "Educate Ya" | 2017 | Pitbull | Climate Change |
| "La Ex" | 2018 | Maluma | F.A.M.E. |
| "More" | 2019 | Gucci Mane | East Atlanta Santa 3 |
| "The Rum Tum Tugger" | 2019 | none | Cats: Highlights from the Motion Picture Soundtrack |

== Production discography ==
List of non-performing songwriting credits (excluding guest appearances, interpolations, and samples)
| Track(s) | Year | Credit | Artist(s) | Album |
|---|---|---|---|---|
| 14. "Playing with Fire"; (featuring Betty White) | 2008 | Songwriter | Lil Wayne | Tha Carter III |
| 1. "Replay" | 2009 | Songwriter | Iyaz | Replay |
| 2. "Solo" | 2009 | Songwriter | Iyaz | Replay |
| 7. "Lesson for Life" | 2011 | Songwriter | Charice | Infinity |
| 2. "Runnin'" | 2011 | Songwriter | Javier Colon | Come Through for You |
| 5. "Playing with My Heart" | 2013 | Songwriter | Alex Gaudino | Doctor Love |
| 3. "Loving You Is Easy" | 2013 | Songwriter | Union J | Union J |
| 2. "Me Too" | 2016 | Songwriter | Meghan Trainor | Thank You |
| 28. "Good Vibrations" | 2017 | Songwriter | Ricky Reed | Patrick Doyle – The Emoji Movie (Original Motion Picture Soundtrack) |
| 4. "Back for More"; (featuring Jeremih) | 2018 | Songwriter | Justine Skye | Ultraviolet |
| 11. "This Time Around" | 2024 | Songwriter | Jennifer Lopez | This Is Me... Now |
| 12. "Midnight Trip to Vegas" | 2024 | Songwriter | Jennifer Lopez | This Is Me... Now |

== Music videos ==
List of music videos, with directors, showing year released
| Title | Year | Director(s) |
As lead artist
| "Whatcha Say" | 2009 | Bernard Gourley |
| "In My Head" | 2010 | Kai Crawford |
| "Ridin' Solo" | 2010 | Scott Speer |
| "What If" | 2010 | Ethan Lader |
| "The Sky's the Limit" | 2010 | Kevin Shulman |
| "Don't Wanna Go Home" | 2011 | Rich Lee |
| "It Girl" | 2011 | Colin Tilley |
| "Breathing" | 2011 | Colin Tilley |
| "Fight for You" | 2011 | Colin Tilley |
| "The Other Side" | 2013 | Colin Tilley |
| "Talk Dirty" (featuring 2 Chainz) | 2013 | Colin Tilley |
| "Marry Me" | 2013 | Hannah Lux Davis |
| "Trumpets" | 2013 | Collin Tilley, Jason Derulo |
| "Stupid Love" | 2014 | Gil Green |
| "Wiggle" (featuring Snoop Dogg) | 2014 | Colin Tilley |
| "Want to Want Me" | 2015 | Colin Tilley |
| "Cheyenne" | 2015 | Syndrome |
| "Get Ugly" | 2015 | Syndrome |
| "Naked" | 2016 | Bernard Gourley |
| "If It Ain't Love" | 2016 | Jason Derulo & Joe Labisi |
| "Kiss the Sky" | 2016 | Andy Hines |
| "Swalla" (featuring Nicki Minaj and Ty Dolla $ign) | 2017 | Gil Green |
| "If I'm Lucky" | 2017 | Jason Derulo, Jeremy Strong |
| "Tip Toe" (featuring French Montana) | 2017 | Jason Derulo, Jeremy Strong |
| "Colors" | 2018 | Gil Green |
| "Goodbye" (with David Guetta featuring Nicki Minaj and Willy William) | 2018 | Jason Derulo, David Strbik, Jeremy Strong |
| "Make Up" (with Vice featuring Ava Max) | 2018 | Isaac Rentz |
| "Shut Up and Dance" (with Lay and NCT 127) | 2019 | Daniel Russell |
| "Mamacita" (featuring Farruko) | 2019 | Jason Derulo |
| "Champion" (featuring Tia Ray) | 2019 | Jason Derulo |
| "Too Hot" | 2019 | Jason Derulo |
| "Savage Love" (with Jawsh 685) | 2020 | David Strib |
| "Lifestyle" (featuring Adam Levine) | 2021 | None |
| "Jalebi Baby" (with Tesher) | 2021 | Gil Green |
| "Ta Ta Ta" (with Bayanni) | 2023 | |
| "Spicy Margarita" (with Michael Bublé) | 2024 | Vin Bogart |
As featured artist
| "Text" (Mann featuring Jason Derulo) | 2010 | Kevin Shulman |
| "Overnight Celebrity" (cameo appearance) (Alyssa Shouse featuring Jason Derulo) | 2010 | Justin Baldoni |
| "Test Drive" (Jin Akanishi featuring Jason Derulo) | 2011 | Frank Borin |
| "Chingalinga" (Alyxx Dione featuring Jason Derulo) | 2015 | Dano Cerny |
| "Secret Love Song" (Little Mix featuring Jason Derulo) | 2016 | Frank Borin |
| "Hello Friday" (Flo Rida featuring Jason Derulo) | 2016 | Alex Acosta |
