= Breathing (Jason Derulo song) =

Single by Jason Derulo

from the album Future History
- Released: October 24, 2011
- Recorded: 2011
- Genre: Eurodance
- Length: 3:54
- Label: Beluga Heights; Warner Bros.
- Songwriters: Jason Desrouleaux; Jacob Luttrell; Lauren Christy; Julian Bunetta; Krassimir Tsvetano Kurkchiyski; Shope Trad; Folksong Thrace
- Producer: DJ Frank E

Jason Derulo singles chronology
"It Girl" (2011)	"Breathing" (2011)	"Test Drive" (2011)

"Breathing" is a song recorded by American recording artist Jason Derulo for his second studio album, Future History (2011). It was written by Lauren Christy, Julian Bunetta, Krassimir Tsvetanov Kurkchiyski, Shope Trad and Folksong Thrace, while production of the song was helmed by DJ Frank E. "Breathing" was initially released as one of four promotional singles for the album in September 2011. It was later released to contemporary hit radio in Australia on October 24, 2011, and elsewhere from January 31, 2012, as the third single from Future History. Musically, "Breathing" is a Eurodance song that displays influences of electro and house, and features "tribal vocal chorales" in the background. It samples the song "Pilentze Pee", which is sung by the Bulgarian State Television Female Vocal Choir. Lyrical inspiration for the song came from the death of Derulo's cousin, who died in 2011.

"Breathing" garnered positive reviews by many music critics, most of whom praised the production. The song attained moderate chart success, where it peaked inside the top-ten on the singles charts in Australia, Austria, Bulgaria, Germany, Slovakia and Switzerland. Additionally, it reached the top-thirty in France, the Netherlands, New Zealand and the United Kingdom. The song peaked at number 28 on the US Pop Songs chart. "Breathing" was certified double platinum by the Australian Recording Industry Association (ARIA), for shipments of 140,000 copies. The accompanying music video was directed by Colin Tilley, and features Derulo in an abandoned warehouse, as well as other scenes of him shirtless in a blue tinted room. Derulo performed "Breathing" live at the Belfast City Hall in Northern Ireland, to coincide with the 2011 MTV Europe Music Awards. The song has been covered by British recording artist Cher Lloyd.

== Background and release ==
"Breathing" was written by Jason Derulo, Jacob Luttrell, Lauren Christy, Julian Bunetta, Krassimir Tsvetano Kurkchiyski, Shope Trad and Folksong Thrace, while production of the song was helmed by DJ Frank E. The track was mixed by Manny Marroquin at Larrabee Sound Studios in North Hollywood, Los Angeles, with assistance by Erik Madrid and Chris Galland. Luttrell and Frank E played keyboards on the song, and the drums and synth programming was handled by Frank E. During an interview with Digital Spy, Derulo revealed that the inspiration for "Breathing" came from the death of his cousin in 2011. He stated, "That song means a lot to me as it's serious and heartfelt". Derulo further explained that "Breathing" was heavily influenced by African chants, Eurodance and rock guitar.

"Breathing" was released digitally worldwide on September 9, 2011, as the third promotional single for Future History. The song later impacted contemporary hit radios in Australia on October 24, 2011, as the third official single from the album. In the United States, "Breathing" was sent to contemporary hit radio and rhythmic contemporary radio playlists on January 31, 2012. In Germany, it was made available as a CD single on February 24, 2012. In the United Kingdom, a CD single and digital EP, which contains the album version, an instrumental version and three remixes of "Breathing", was released on February 26, 2012.

== Composition and lyrics ==
"Breathing"
A 20-second audio sample of the chorus of the song, containing lyrics about winning back a past love.

"Breathing" is three minutes and fifty-four seconds long. It is a Eurodance song that displays influences of electro and house. "Breathing" is written in the key of B♭ minor and is set in common time with a tempo of 120 beats per minute. Derulo's vocal range spans from the note of F_{4} to the note of F_{6}. The song features "tribal vocal chorales" in the background, and samples the Bulgarian folk song "Pilentze Pee", which is sung by the Bulgarian State Television Female Vocal Choir. The song contains lyrical content about winning back a past love. "Breathing" opens with a "slow build-up of synths and a quick club beat" before Derulo sings: "I only miss you when I'm breathing / I only miss you when my heart is beating / You are the color that I'm bleeding / I only miss you when I'm breathing." Scott Shetler of PopCrush noted that he appears to be screaming the vocals during the chorus line: "I only miss you when I'm breathing", writing that "his final note [is] stretched out for several seconds".

== Critical reception ==
"Breathing" received positive reviews from music critics. Robert Copsey of Digital Spy described the song as "hypnotic" and "an impressive club pumper". He praised "Breathing" for being a perfect tribute to Derulo's late cousin. Nicole James of MTV Buzzworthy viewed the song as a "more subtle route" than the album's previous promotional single "Pick Up the Pieces". She praised Derulo for knowing "how to make a dance song" and wrote that "Breathing" is the type of song you would add "to your Girls' Night Out playlist". Aaron-Spencer Charles of Metro wrote that the song is "an anthem for the clubs" that fans of pop and dance music would love. Pete Rivas of The AU Review praised the song's hook and likened its catchy production to the album's other two singles "Don't Wanna Go Home" and "It Girl" Scott Shetler and other reviewers of PopCrush wrote that "'Breathing' is a song we could definitely get down to in a club". Ben Chalk of MSN Music viewed "Breathing" as one of the standout tracks on Future History. He concluded by writing that in the song, "Derulo's energy overshadows the kitchen sink production and inane lyrics". Meena Rupani of DesiHits noted that "Breathing" is "more tribal" than his previous singles. Rupani also noted Derulo's continuation of past themes, "as he tries to romance the ladies with his cheesy lyrics but also keep the guys dancing in the clubs with the beats".

== Chart performance ==
In Australia, "Breathing" debuted at number 36 on the ARIA Singles Chart on November 14, 2011. It peaked at number nine in its fifth week on the chart, becoming Derulo's sixth top-ten single in that country. "Breathing" also charted on the Australian Urban Singles Chart at number four. It was certified double platinum by the Australian Recording Industry Association (ARIA), denoting shipments of 140,000 copies. "Breathing" debuted at number 37 on the New Zealand Singles Chart on December 12, 2011. It ascended to number 30 in its third week, but descended the chart for the following two weeks. "Breathing" managed to peak at number 28 in its sixth week. In the United States, "Breathing" peaked at number 28 on the Pop Songs chart, but failed to impact the Billboard Hot 100.

"Breathing" achieved commercial success in Europe. It peaked at number one on the Bulgarian Airplay Chart, and number four on the Slovak Airplay Chart. In Austria, "Breathing" debuted at number 43 on February 10, 2012, and peaked at number eight in its fifth week on the chart. It peaked at number five on the German Singles Chart, becoming Derulo's third top-ten single in that country. The song was certified gold by Bundesverband Musikindustrie (BVMI), denoting shipments of 150,000 copies. In Switzerland, "Breathing" debuted at number 33 on March 11, 2012. It descended to number 50 in its second week on the chart, but managed to peak at number seven in its seventh week. The song was certified gold by the International Federation of the Phonographic Industry (IFPI), denoting sales of 15,000 copies. "Breathing" peaked at number 19 on the Irish Singles Chart and spent a total of ten weeks in the chart. In the United Kingdom, the song debuted at number 101 on January 28, 2012, and ascended to number 49 the following week. It managed to peak at number 25 in its seventh week on the chart. "Breathing" also charted on the UK R&B Singles Chart at number nine.

== Promotion ==
=== Music video ===
The accompanying music video for "Breathing" was directed by Colin Tilley and premiered exclusively on PopCrush.com on November 3, 2011. The video begins with Derulo on the balcony of a building at night, as well as scenes of him sitting in an old chair surrounded by cobwebs inside an industrial warehouse. There are then scenes which feature Derulo standing shirtless in a dark, blue-tinted room, digitally showing the insides of his body to show the intensity of his emotion. After the first chorus, Derulo then rises out of the chair and begins to dance. During the bridge, Derulo is shown kissing his former love interest, before several female backup dancers join him to perform choreography in the final chorus. Aaron-Spencer Charles of Metro noted that the video had "some impressive footwork and a great 'straight jacket' dance move with the choreographed piece with female dancers." A reviewer for 4Music also praised Derulo's dance routines in the video. Contessa Gayles of AOL Music described the video as "creepy" and compared it to Rihanna's "Disturbia" (2008) video.

=== Live performances and cover versions ===
On November 6, 2011, Derulo performed "Breathing" at the Belfast City Hall in Northern Ireland, to coincide with the 2011 MTV Europe Music Awards. The song was part of a set list, which also included "Whatcha Say", "In My Head", "Don't Wanna Go Home" and "It Girl". In 2012, British recording artist Cher Lloyd performed a cover of "Breathing" as part of the set list for her Sticks and Stones Tour.

== Formats and track listings ==
- Digital download
1. "Breathing" – 3:54
- German and UK CD single
1. "Breathing" (Album Version) – 3:54
2. "Breathing" (Michael Mind Project Remix) – 5:39
- UK Digital EP
1. "Breathing" – 3:54
2. "Breathing" (JRMX Radio Edit) – 3:54
3. "Breathing" (JRMX Club Mix) – 7:49
4. "Breathing" (TRC Remix) – 4:35
5. "Breathing" (Instrumental) – 3:56

== Credits and personnel ==
Credits adapted from the liner notes for Future History.

- Julian Bunetta – songwriter
- Lauren Christy – songwriter
- Jason Desrouleaux – lead vocals, songwriter
- DJ Frank E – drums and synth programming, keyboard, producer
- Chris Galland – assistant mixer
- Krassimir Tsvetanov Kurkchiyski – songwriter
- Jacob Luttrell – keyboard, songwriter
- Eric Madrid – assistant mixer
- Manny Marroquin – mixer
- Folksong Thrace – songwriter
- Shope Trad – songwriter

== Charts ==
=== Weekly charts ===
Chart (2011–2012)	Peak position
Australia (ARIA)	9
Australia Urban (ARIA)	4
Austria (Ö3 Austria Top 40)	8
Belgium (Ultratop 50 Flanders)	36
Belgium (Ultratip Bubbling Under Wallonia)	2
Bulgaria (IFPI)	1
Czech Republic Airplay (ČNS IFPI)	26
France (SNEP)	28
Germany (GfK)	5
Germany Airplay (BVMI)	1
Hungary (Editors' Choice Top 40)	19
Ireland (IRMA)	19
Lebanon (Lebanese Top 20)	2
Luxembourg Digital Song Sales (Billboard)	3
Netherlands (Dutch Top 40)	28
Netherlands (Single Top 100)	56
New Zealand (Recorded Music NZ)	28
Romania (Airplay 100)	40
Scotland Singles (OCC)	21
Slovakia Airplay (ČNS IFPI)	4
Spain (Promusicae)	43
Switzerland (Schweizer Hitparade)	7
UK Singles (OCC)	25
UK Hip Hop/R&B (OCC)	9
US Bubbling Under Hot 100 (Billboard)	12
US Pop Airplay (Billboard)	28

=== Year-end charts ===
Chart (2011)	Position
Australian Singles Chart	91
Australian Urban Singles Chart	32

Chart (2012)	Position
Australian Urban Singles Chart	49
Austrian Singles Chart	70
Germany (Media Control AG)	40
Swiss Singles Chart	68

== Certifications ==
Region	Certification	Certified units/sales
Australia (ARIA)	2× Platinum	140,000^{^}
Austria (IFPI Austria)	Gold	15,000^{*}
Germany (BVMI)	Gold	150,000^{^}
Switzerland (IFPI Switzerland)	Gold	15,000^{^}
^{*} Sales figures based on certification alone.^{^} Shipments figures based on certification alone.

== Release history ==
=== Promotional single ===
Country	Date	Format	Label
Austria	September 9, 2011	Digital download	Beluga Heights; Warner Bros.
Belgium	September 9, 2011	Digital download	Beluga Heights; Warner Bros.
Canada	September 9, 2011	Digital download	Beluga Heights; Warner Bros.
Denmark	September 9, 2011	Digital download	Beluga Heights; Warner Bros.
France	September 9, 2011	Digital download	Beluga Heights; Warner Bros.
Germany	September 9, 2011	Digital download	Beluga Heights; Warner Bros.
Netherlands	September 9, 2011	Digital download	Beluga Heights; Warner Bros.
Sweden	September 9, 2011	Digital download	Beluga Heights; Warner Bros.
Switzerland	September 9, 2011	Digital download	Beluga Heights; Warner Bros.
United States	September 9, 2011	Digital download	Beluga Heights; Warner Bros.

=== Single release ===
Country	Date	Format	Label
Australia	October 24, 2011	Contemporary hit radio	Beluga Heights; Warner Bros.
United States	January 31, 2012	Contemporary hit radio	Beluga Heights; Warner Bros.
United States	January 31, 2012	Rhythmic contemporary radio	Beluga Heights; Warner Bros.
Germany	February 24, 2012	CD single	Beluga Heights; Warner Bros.
United Kingdom	February 26, 2012	CD single; digital EP	Beluga Heights; Warner Bros.
