= Fight for You =

Fight for You may refer to:

- "Fight for You" (H.E.R. song), 2021
- "Fight for You" (Jason Derulo song), 2011
