= Future History (album) =

Studio album by Jason Derulo
- Released: September 16, 2011
- Genres: Pop; EDM; R&B
- Length: 44:33
- Labels: Beluga Heights; Warner Bros.
- Producers: BeatGeek; Jason Derulo; DJ Frank E; the Fliptones; Frank Harris; Heather Jeanette; Claude Kelly; Emanuel "Eman" Kiriakou; Jai Marlon; Carlos "Los" McKinney; Terius Nash; the Outerlimits; RedOne; Tim Roberts; Frank Romano; J. R. Rotem; Geo Slam; Pat Thrall; JD Walker; Jai Marlon

Jason Derulo chronology
Jason Derulo (2010)	Future History (2011)	Tattoos (2013)

Singles from Future History
- 1. "Don't Wanna Go Home" Released: May 23, 2011; 2. "It Girl" Released: August 9, 2011; 3. "Breathing" Released: October 24, 2011; 4. "Fight for You" Released: December 2, 2011; 5. "Pick Up the Pieces" Released: August 9, 2012

Future History is the second studio album by American singer and songwriter Jason Derulo, released on September 16, 2011. As the executive producer of the album, Derulo collaborated with several record producers, including DJ Frank E, the Fliptones, the Outerlimits, Emanuel Kiriakou, RedOne, Jai Marlon and frequent collaborator J.R. Rotem, among others.

Exploring a stronger EDM influence than his previous outing, Future History received mixed reviews from music critics, who found the record to be too commercial and overcalculated. In the United States, the album debuted at number 29 on the Billboard 200, with first-week sales of 13,000 copies, significantly fewer than his debut album a year prior. The album reached the top ten in Australia, New Zealand and the United Kingdom, and the top twenty in Ireland and Switzerland.

Preceding the album's release was the lead single "Don't Wanna Go Home", which peaked at number 14 on the US Billboard Hot 100, and became Derulo's second number one on the UK Singles Chart. "It Girl" was released as the album's second single, which reached the top ten in several countries. "Breathing" and "Fight for You" were released with moderate success, as the album's third and fourth singles, respectively. "Undefeated" was released as the first single from the platinum edition of the album in 2012.

== Background ==
It's the bridge between where I've come from, where I see myself going and what my future holds ... My growth as a singer and performer over the last three years has been amazing. But I think my growth as a man is the key to this album. There's more mature subject matter[s], more emotion, more edge."
—Derulo with Billboard on the album.

During an interview with Rap-Up magazine in May 2011, Derulo stated that the album was "a bunch of reinventions ... I’ve experienced so much in these last two years. When I recorded my first record I was 19 years old and now I'm 21." He also revealed that he showed more than one side with the album, stating "There's records on the album that are deeply emotional, very vulnerable, just all sorts of things." Derulo spoke more about the album in an interview with Billboard magazine, stating, "I like to write music based on who I am as a person, and this [album] is far different from the first one. On the first one I didn't have club tracks because I hadn't experienced that at all, and on this one my first record is about the most amazing party you've ever been to." During a promotional tour in the United Kingdom, Derulo told 4Music that the album was the greatest accomplishment of his life, "I've never been more excited about something. I've put a lot of blood, sweat and tears into this record." He further added that, "It's more growth than anything. I've grown more in these last two years than I've grown in my whole life." In an interview with The Daily Telegraph, Derulo stated that the title Future History reflects his desire for longevity in the music business. "I would like my music to live after me ... I want my music to be what is in the history books in the future."

== Recording ==
Most of Future History was recorded at Serenity West Recording Studio in Los Angeles, California; other recording sessions in Los Angeles took place at Chalice Recording Studios and Jim Henson Studios. Westlake Recording Studios in Hollywood, California was also used for recording. Derulo began working on the album in September 2010 and recorded 150 songs. He detailed his journey recording the album via a series of webisodes that were posted on his official website every Friday. In an interview with Billboard magazine, Derulo said that he recorded the track "Make It Up as We Go" while he was drunk, stating "cause that's just what it was at that time. I can never recapture that. Me being sober would just not be the same, because at that moment that's what I was feeling and how I'm saying it is exactly how it's supposed to be said." Derulo also revealed that while recording another song titled "Grieving", he was "crying in the booth ... it's just that emotional and personal to me." The album was mastered by Chris Gehringer at Sterling Sound in New York City.

== Release and promotion ==
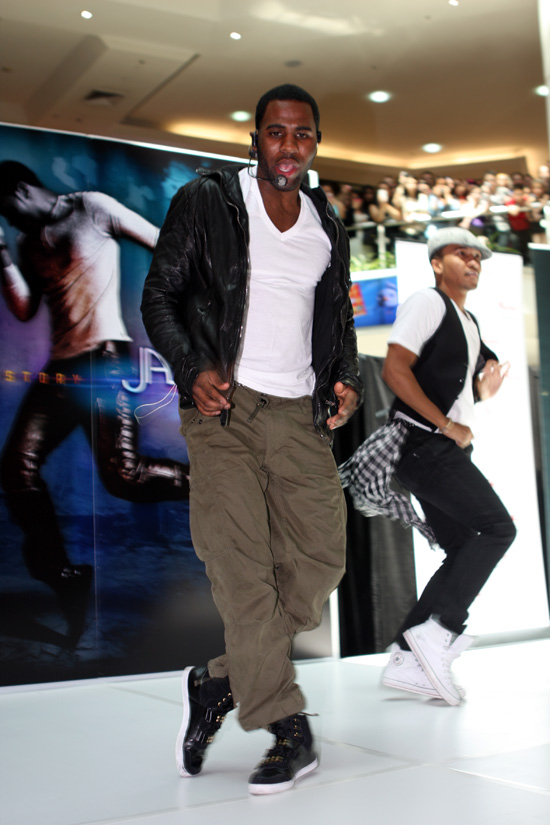
Derulo performing at the Westfield Parramatta shopping centre in Australia on October 16, 2011.

The album's official cover was revealed on August 1, 2011, the same day the album's US release date was revealed. On August 4, Derulo performed "It Girl" and "Don't Wanna Go Home" on America's Got Talent. He also performed "Don't Wanna Go Home" at the 2011 Teen Choice Awards on August 7. Wearing a black leather jacket, T-shirt, skinny jeans and black leather gloves, Derulo performed the song with a troop of dancers, while a giant screen projecting his name in gold glittery lettering was shown on the stage backdrop. "That's My Shhh" was released for digital download in the United States on August 26, as the first promotional single from Future History. "Make It Up as We Go" was released on September 2, 2011, as the second promotional single from the album. "Breathing" and "Pick Up the Pieces" were both released on September 9 as the third and fourth promotional singles.

To promote the album, Derulo and the Knicks City Dancers held a flash mob outside Madison Square Garden in Manhattan, New York City on September 28. He performed several songs from the album as well as songs from his previous album, including "In My Head", while the Knicks City Dancers served as his back-up dancers. The following day, Derulo made a guest appearance on Live with Regis and Kelly to perform "Don't Wanna Go Home" and "It Girl". On September 30, he performed "It Girl" on The Wendy Williams Show. During a promotional tour in Australia, Derulo performed "It Girl" and "Don't Wanna Go Home" at the Westfield Parramatta shopping centre in Parramatta, New South Wales on October 16. He also performed the two songs on The X Factor Australia on October 18.

=== Singles ===
"Don't Wanna Go Home" was released as the album's lead single. It was sent to contemporary hit radio in the United States on May 10, 2011, and released via iTunes Stores worldwide on May 20, 2011. The song was met with mixed reviews from music critics; some critics praised its production and lyrics, while others observed its lack of originality. "Don't Wanna Go Home" peaked at number 14 on the US Billboard Hot 100, and reached the top ten in Australia, Austria, Canada and Ireland. It also became Derulo's second number one single in the United Kingdom, after "In My Head" (2010). "It Girl" was released as the second single from the album on August 9, 2011. The song received positive reviews from music critics, who praised its catchy production and radio-friendly lyrics. "It Girl" peaked at number 17 on the US Billboard Hot 100, and reached the top ten in Australia, Denmark, Ireland, New Zealand and the UK.

"Breathing" was released to contemporary hit radio in Australia on October 24, 2011, and elsewhere from January 31, 2012, as the third single from Future History. The song garnered positive reviews from music critics, most of whom praised the production. "Breathing" peaked inside the top ten on the singles charts in Australia, Austria, Bulgaria, Germany, Slovakia and Switzerland. "Fight for You" was released as the album's fourth single on December 2, 2011. The song's production and Derulo's vocal performance garnered positive reviews from music critics, however, some criticized its lack of originality. "Fight for You" peaked at number 83 on the US Billboard hot 100, number five in Australia, and at number 15 in the UK. "Undefeated" was released as the first single from the platinum edition of Future History on May 22, 2012. The song peaked at number 90 on the US Billboard Hot 100, and reached number 14 in Australia.

== Critical reception ==
Professional ratings
Aggregate scores
Source	Rating
Metacritic	59/100
Review scores
Source	Rating
AllMusic	3/5 stars
Cuepoint (Expert Witness)	(3-star Honorable Mention)
Digital Spy	3/5 stars
Entertainment Weekly	B−
The Guardian	2/5 stars
Rolling Stone	3/5 stars

Future History received generally mixed reviews from music critics. At Metacritic, which assigns a weighted mean rating out of 100 to reviews from mainstream critics, the album received an average score of 59, based on five reviews, which indicates "mixed or average reviews". Allmusic editor David Jeffries complimented Derulo’s "conviction" and called the album "an ambitious stab at growth in the pop-R&B world of 2011", but found the songs formulaic, stating "Derulo’s still saying nothing" noting the album as a collection of "hooky, club cuts". MSN Music's Alex Thornton viewed that the album "may not be a huge expansion on his formula", but stated, "while 'Future History' is chock-full of Auto-Tune and pyrotechnics, Derulo can actually sing and the effects are more of a means to an end than a crutch". Jody Rosen of Rolling Stone described its music as "party-hearty robo R&B" and stated, "Derulo doesn't travel light; on nearly every song he stuffs his suitcase until the seams split. [...] But Derulo is endearingly into it – he attacks the songs – and he can sing. [...] He's just a bit too overeager – too determined to please all of the people all of the time." In Cuepoint, Robert Christgau gave the album a three-star honorable mention, which indicates "an enjoyable effort consumers attuned to its overriding aesthetic or individual vision may well treasure". He cited "Breathing" and "It Girl" as highlights and said Derulo was "definitely not as dumb as he pretends to think he is".

Entertainment Weekly's Brad Wete noted "several attempts at home-run club records and huge ballads" and wrote that Derulo "swings hard, but often misses – perhaps his biggest problem is that he's not rooted in any genre outside of people- pleasing pop", adding that he "should give true R&B a try." Michael Cragg of BBC Music criticized the "meaningless slogans and relationship clichés" in the lyrics and stated, "As with his self-titled debut, Future History is more of a collection of singles than an album, but it feels a little more calculated." Digital Spy critic Robert Copsey shared a similar sentiment and, despite complimenting the dance tracks "Breathing" and "Fight for You", he found "little in the way of surprises elsewhere". Caroline Sullivan of The Guardian criticized Derulo's "gauche declarations" and called Future History "an album that cleaves so closely to this year's ubiquitous pop/urban sound that you wonder whether the Florida-born crooner has an original idea in his head."

== Commercial performance ==
In the United States, Future History debuted at number 29 on the Billboard 200, with first-week sales of 13,000 copies. This was significantly lower than that of his previous album, Jason Derulo, which debuted at number 11 and sold 43,000 copies in its first week. It has sold 80,000 as of April 2014.

== Track listing ==
No.	Title	Writer(s)	Producer(s)	Length
1.	"Don't Wanna Go Home"	Jason Desrouleaux; Chaz Mishan; David Delazyn; William Attaway; Irving Burgie; Allen George; Fred McFarlane	The Fliptones; Tim Roberts^{[a]}; Heather Jeanette^{[a]}	3:26
2.	"It Girl"	Desrouleaux; Emanuel Kiriakou; E. Kidd Bogart; Lindy Robbins	Emanuel "Eman" Kiriakou	3:12
3.	"Breathing"	Desrouleaux; Jacob Luttrell; Lauren Christy; Julian Bunetta; Krassimir Tsvetano Kurkchiyski; Shope Trad; Folksong Thrace	DJ Frank E	3:54
4.	"Be Careful"	Desrouleaux; J. R. Rotem; Claude Kelly	J.R. Rotem; Kelly^{[b]}	3:34
5.	"Make It Up As We Go"	Desrouleaux; Mishan; Delazyn	The Fliptones; Desrouleaux^{[a]}	3:10
6.	"Fight for You"	Desrouleaux; Steve Hoang; David F. Paich; Jeffrey T. Porcaro	RedOne; BeatGeek; Geo Slam	4:02
7.	"Pick Up the Pieces"	Desrouleaux; Josh J.D Walker; Olivia Waithe; Tiffany Fred; Kelly Sheehan; Michael McGregor; Peter King; Lee Monteverde	J.R. Rotem; JD Walker^{[a]}	3.34
8.	"Givin' Up"	Desrouleaux; Mishan; Delazyn	The Fliptones	3:50
9.	"Bleed Out"	Desrouleaux; Kara DioGuardi; Mike Caren	DJ Frank E	4:08
10.	"That's My Shhh"	Desrouleaux; Terius Nash; Carlos McKinney	Carlos "Los" McKinney; Nash; Pat Thrall^{[b]}	4:21
11.	"X"	Desrouleaux; Mishan; Delazyn; Sidney Swift; Alexander C. Goodwin; David "Reds" Malcolm; Monea William Stewart	The Fliptones; the Outerlimits	3:32
12.	"Dumb"	Desrouleaux; Rotem; William Jordan; Clemie Penton; Frank Romano	J.R Rotem; Romano^{[a]}	3:50

Deluxe Edition bonus tracks
No.	Title	Producer(s)	Length
13.	"Overdose"	The Fliptones	3:19
14.	"Give It to Me"	The Fliptones	3:24

Deluxe Edition bonus videos
No.	Title	Length
15.	"Don't Wanna Go Home" (music video)	3:57
16.	"It Girl" (music video)	3:13

Japanese Limited Edition bonus tracks
No.	Title	Writer(s)	Producer(s)	Length
13.	"Bombs Away"	Desrouleaux; Kelly; Marlon Jean	Jai Marlon	4:03
14.	"Don't Wanna Go Home" (Club Junkies Radio Mix)	Desrouleaux; Mishan; Delazyn; Attaway; Burgie; George; McFarlane	The Fliptones; Roberts^{[a]}; Jeanette^{[a]}	3:42
15.	"Don't Wanna Go Home" (7th Heaven Club Mix)	Desrouleaux; Mishan; Delazyn; Attaway; Burgie; George; McFarlane	The Fliptones; Roberts^{[a]}; Jeanette^{[a]}	7:54

=== Promo Box Set ===
Bonus disc
No.	Title	Length
1.	"Don't Wanna Go Home" (Radio Edit)
2.	"Don't Wanna Go Home" (Instrumental)
3.	"Don't Wanna Go Home" (7th Heaven Radio Edit)
4.	"It Girl" (Radio Edit)
5.	"It Girl" (Instrumental)
6.	"It Girl" (RAW Radio Edit)
7.	"Breathing" (Radio Edit)
8.	"Breathing" (Instrumental)
9.	"Fight for You" (Radio Edit)
10.	"Fight for You" (Instrumental)
11.	"Pick Up the Pieces" (Radio Edit)
12.	"Pick Up the Pieces" (Instrumental)
13.	"Whatcha Say"	3:42
14.	"Ridin' Solo"	3:36
15.	"In My Head"	3:18
16.	"What If"	3:22

Bonus DVD
No.	Title	Length
1.	"Future History (Documentary)"
2.	"Don't Wanna Go Home" (music video)
3.	"It Girl" (music video)
4.	"Future History (TV spots)"
5.	"Don't Wanna Go Home" (Fedde Le Grand Journal performance)
6.	"It Girl" (National Lottery)
7.	"Electronic Press Kit"

=== Platinum Edition ===
Disc 1
No.	Title	Writer(s)	Producer(s)	Length
1.	"Don't Wanna Go Home"	Desrouleaux; Mishan; Delazyn; Attaway; Burgie; George; McFarlane	The Fliptones; Tim Roberts^{[a]}; Heather Jeanette^{[a]}	3:26
2.	"It Girl"	Desrouleaux; Kiriakou; Bogart; Robbins	Emanuel "Eman" Kiriakou	3:12
3.	"Breathing"	Desrouleaux; Luttrell; Christy; Bunetta; Kurkchiyski; Trad; Thrace	DJ Frank E	3:54
4.	"Be Careful"	Desrouleaux; Rotem; Kelly	J.R. Rotem, Kelly^{[b]}	3:34
5.	"Make It Up as We Go"	Desrouleaux; Mishan; Delazyn	The Fliptones; Desrouleaux^{[a]}	3:10
6.	"Fight for You"	Desrouleaux; Hoang; Paich; Porcaro	RedOne; BeatGeek; Geo Slam	4:02
7.	"Pick Up the Pieces"	Desrouleaux; Walker; Waithe; Tiffany Fred; McGregor; King; Monteverde; Sheehan	J.R. Rotem; JD Walker^{[a]}	3.34
8.	"Givin' Up"	Desrouleaux; Mishan; Delazyn	The Fliptones	3:50
9.	"Bleed Out"	Desrouleaux; DioGuardi; Caren	DJ Frank E	4:08
10.	"That's My Shhh"	Desrouleaux; Nash; McKinney	Carlos "Los" McKinney; Nash; Thrall^{[b]}	4:21
11.	"X"	Desrouleaux; Mishan; Delazyn; Sidney Swift; Goodwin; Malcolm; Stewart	The Fliptones; the Outerlimits; Instinctz Beats	3:32
12.	"Dumb"	Desrouleaux; Rotem; Will Jordan; Clemm Rishad Penton; Romano	J.R. Rotem; Romano^{[a]}	3:50
13.	"Undefeated"	Desrouleaux; Justin Franks; J Hart	DJ Frank E	3:36

Disc 2
No.	Title	Writer(s)	Producer(s)	Length
1.	"Whatcha Say" (Klubjumpers Remix Radio)	Desrouleaux; Kisean Anderson; J-Lex	J.R. Rotem; Fuego	4:02
2.	"What If" (Jason Nevins Radio Mix)	Desrouleaux; Rotem; Lex	J.R. Rotem	4:07
3.	"In My Head" (Wideboys Club Mix)	Desrouleaux; Kelly; Rotem	J.R. Rotem	5:21
4.	"Don't Wanna Go Home" (Club Junkies Radio Mix)	Desrouleaux; Mishan; Delazyn; Attaway; Burgie; George; McFarlane	The Fliptones; Roberts^{[a]}; Jeanette^{[a]}	3:42
5.	"Ridin' Solo" (Ian Nieman Club Mix)	Desrouleaux; Rotem; Xavier Thomas	J.R. Rotem	6:58
6.	"It Girl" (R.A.W. Club Mix)	Desrouleaux; Kiriakou; Bogart; Robbins	Emanuel "Eman" Kiriakou	6:25
7.	"Whatcha Say" (Wawa Remix Radio)	Desrouleaux; Anderson; J-Lex	J.R. Rotem; Fuego	3:25
8.	"Fight for You" (MYNC Edit)	Desrouleaux; Hoang; Paich; Porcaro	RedOne; BeatGeek; Geo Slam	3:25
9.	"The Sky's the Limit" (Ayo Remix)	Desrouleaux; Rotem; Bogart; Alex James; Irene Cara; Keith Forsey; Giorgio Moroder	J.R. Rotem	3:25
10.	"Don't Wanna Go Home" (7th Heaven Club Mix)	Desrouleaux; Mishan; Delazyn; Attaway; Burgie; George; McFarlane	The Fliptones; Roberts*; Jeanette*	7:54
11.	"It Girl" (7th Heaven Club Mix)	Desrouleaux; Kiriakou; Bogart; Robbins	Emanuel "Eman" Kiriakou	6:24
12.	"What If" (Mig & Rizzo Pop Mix)	Desrouleaux; Rotem; Lex	J.R Rotem	3:07

Notes

- ^{^[a]} – co-producer
- ^{^[b]} – vocal producer
- The CD deluxe edition is an autographed copy of Future History, and contains the music videos for "Don't Wanna Go Home" and "It Girl".
- The merchandise edition contains, a button set, poster, 2x silicone wristbands and three sticker sheets.

Sample credits

- "Don't Wanna Go Home" contains interpolates of "Day-O (The Banana Boat Song)" and contains samples of "Show Me Love".
- "Breathing" contains elements of "Pilentze Pee", written by Krassimir Tsvetano Kurkchiyski, Shope Trad and Folksong Thrace.
- "Make It Up as We Go" samples "A City Under Siege", performed by Boy 8-Bit.
- "Fight for You" contains an interpolation of "Africa", written by David F. Paich and Jeffrey T. Porcaro.
- "Pick Up the Pieces" samples "Open Your Eyes", written by Peter King and Lee Monteverde and performed by Koko.

== Personnel ==
Adapted from album booklet.

Creativity and management

- Ashaunna Ayars – marketing
- Jason Derulo – executive producer
- Kara DioGuardi – A&R
- Jeff Fenster – A&R for Warner Bros. Records
- Charles Hamilton – business affairs for Warner Bros. Records
- Frank Harris – A&R for 23 Management, executive producer, management
- Liza Joseph – A&R administration and coordination
- Frank Maddocks – art direction and design
- James Minchin III – photography
- Nick Spanos – additional center spread photo
- Katy Wolaver – A&R coordination
- Danny Zook – sample clearance
- Corey Lloyd – sample clearance

Instruments and performance

- BeatGeek – instruments and programming
- Jason Derulo – lead vocals, background vocals
- DJ Frank E – keyboards, drum and synth programming
- Andrew Goldstein – additional keyboards and drum programming
- Laila Khayat – background vocals on "Fight for You"
- Samya Khayat – background vocals on "Fight for You"
- Emanuel "Eman" Kiriakou – keyboards, whistle, guitars, bass, percussion, drum programming
- Jens Koerkemler – additional keyboards and drum programming
- Jacob Luttrell – keyboards
- RedOne – instruments and programming, background vocals on "Fight for You"
- Frank Romano – guitars
- J.R. Rotem – instruments
- Teddy Sky – background vocals on "Fight for You"
- Geo Slam – instruments and programming
- Gray Smith – synth and drum programming

Technical and production

- BeatGeek – production
- Jason Derulo – additional production
- DJ Frank E – production
- The Fliptones – production
- Chris Galland – assistant mixing
- Jesus Garnica – assistant mixing
- Chris Gehringer – mastering
- Serban Ghenea – mixing
- John Hanes – engineer mixing
- Justin Hergett – assistant engineer
- Heather Jeanette – additional production
- Jaycen Joshua – mixing
- Rob Katz – engineer
- Claude Kelly – vocal production
- Emanuel "Eman" Kiriakou – production
- Jens Koerkemler – engineering, editing
- Gelly Kusuma – engineering, recording
- Erik Madrid – assistant mixing
- Manny Marroquin – mixing
- Tony Maserati – mixing
- Carlos "Los" McKinney – production
- Charles Moniz – recording
- Trevor Muzzy – mixing
- Terius Nash – production
- The Outerlimits – production
- Jason Patterson – assistant engineer
- Jai Marlon – production
- Frank Romano – additional production
- RedOne – production
- Tim Roberts – additional production, assistant engineer mixing
- Frank Romano – additional production
- J.R. Rotem – production, mixing
- Tatsuya Sato – assistant mastering
- Phil Seaford – assistant engineer mixing
- Geo Slam – production
- Sidney Swift – additional engineering
- Pat Thrall – vocal production, engineering
- JD Walker – production

== Charts ==
=== Weekly charts ===
Chart (2011)	Peak position
Australian Albums (ARIA)	9
Australian Urban Albums (ARIA)	1
Austrian Albums (Ö3 Austria)	38
Belgian Albums (Ultratop Flanders)	38
Belgian Albums (Ultratop Wallonia)	73
Canadian Albums (Nielsen SoundScan)	54
Dutch Albums (Album Top 100)	62
French Albums (SNEP)	46
German Albums (Offizielle Top 100)	32
Irish Albums (IRMA)	18
Italian Albums (FIMI)	69
New Zealand Albums (RMNZ)	6
Scottish Albums (Official Charts)	10
Spanish Albums (Promusicae)	56
Swiss Albums (Schweizer Hitparade)	20
UK Albums (Official Charts)	7
UK R&B Albums (Official Charts)	1
US Billboard 200	29

=== Year-end charts ===
Chart (2011)	Position
Australian Albums (ARIA)	69
Australian Urban Albums (ARIA)	14

Chart (2012)	Position
Australian Urban Albums (ARIA)	22

== Certifications ==
Region	Certification	Certified units/sales
Australia (ARIA)	Platinum	70,000^{‡}
Canada (Music Canada)	Gold	40,000^{‡}
Denmark (IFPI Danmark)	Gold	10,000^{‡}
New Zealand (RMNZ)	Platinum	15,000^{‡}
United Kingdom (BPI)	Gold	100,000^{^}
United States (RIAA)	Gold	500,000^{‡}
^{^} Shipments figures based on certification alone.^{‡} Sales+streaming figures based on certification alone.

== Release history ==
Country	Date	Format	Label	Edition(s)
Germany	September 16, 2011	CD; digital download	Warner Music Group	Standard; deluxe
France	September 19, 2011	CD; digital download	Warner Music Group	Standard; deluxe
Poland	September 19, 2011	CD	Warner Music Group	Standard
Australia	September 23, 2011	CD; digital download	Warner Music Group	Standard; deluxe
New Zealand	September 26, 2011	CD; digital download	Warner Music Group	Standard; deluxe
Canada	September 27, 2011	CD; digital download	Beluga Heights; Warner Bros.	Standard; deluxe
United States	September 27, 2011	CD; digital download	Beluga Heights; Warner Bros.	Standard; deluxe
Japan	September 28, 2011	CD	Warner Music Group	Limited
Ireland	October 7, 2011	Digital download	Warner Music Group	Standard
Netherlands	October 7, 2011	CD	Warner Music Group	Standard; merchandise
United Kingdom	October 10, 2011	CD; digital download	Warner Music Group	Standard; deluxe; merchandise
Brazil	October 31, 2011	CD	Warner Music Group	Standard
Australia	July 27, 2012	CD; digital download	Warner Music Group	Platinum
