= Stevie Hoang =

- Born: 9 June 1985 (age 41)
- Origin: Birmingham, England
- Genres: R&B, hip hop, dance
- Occupations: Singer, songwriter, producer, multi-instrumentalist
- Years active: 2007–present
- Labels: Mercury (UK), Avex (Japan)

Stevie Hoang (born 9 June 1985) is an English singer, songwriter, and record producer signed to Mercury Records and Avex.

== Career ==
Stevie Hoang (pronounced Hwong) learned piano at the age of eleven and showed talent with it. He started his musical career as a producer, working from his parents' house. He has often uploaded home videos of himself performing informal acoustic tracks at home.

In early 2008, Hoang's debut "home-made", self-produced, self-recorded and self-promoted debut album, This Is Me brought him to the attention of the Japanese market, where, after repeated trips, he has sold over 65,000 albums. Stevie Hoang supported N-Dubz and Tinchy Stryder on their 2009 "Uncle B" tour. In 2008, he supported the Girls Aloud Tangled Up Tour.

He followed the release of This Is Me with the independent album All Night Long, and in 2011, the album Unsigned. The album contains "Fight for You", a song Stevie Hoang penned as a single originally with Iyaz. The song was produced with RedOne in Los Angeles, but it was later given to singer Jason Derülo, who recorded it for his 2011 album Future History, crediting Hoang as writer, and releasing it as his fourth single from the album.

== Personal life ==
Stevie Hoang was born in Birmingham, England. He moved to London with his parents when he was one year old.

Since Hoang's surname is a typical Vietnamese spelling of a Chinese name (Huang 黄), many of his fans assume that he is of Vietnamese descent. However, his family were ethnic Chinese from Guangdong Province, who are also known as Hoa, who later moved to England in the 1980s. There have been many comments and debate on his YouTube videos about his ethnicity. Hoang acknowledged his origin in an interview with The Sunday Times. Hoang is an avid Manchester United supporter.

== Discography ==
=== Albums ===
- 2008: This Is Me
- 2009: All Night Long
- 2010: No Coming Back
- 2011: Unsigned
- 2011: Summer Love
- 2012: All For You
- 2012: All For You [ - Bonus Edition - ]
- 2013: Best Of Stevie Hoang
- 2013: The Collection
- 2015: Forever
- 2017: Undiscovered
- 2019: Secrets
- 2021: Legacy
- 2024: Timeless

=== EPs ===
- 2023: Beautiful Heart (EP)
- 2025: Never Break Her Heart (EP)
