= It Girl (Jason Derulo song) =

2011 single by Jason Derulo

Single by Jason Derulo

from the album Future History
- Released: August 9, 2011
- Genre: Pop; R&B
- Length: 3:12
- Label: Beluga Heights; Warner Bros.
- Songwriters: Jason Desrouleaux; Emanuel Kiriakou; E. Kidd Bogart; Lindy Robbins
- Producer: Emanuel Kiriakou

Jason Derulo singles chronology
"Don't Wanna Go Home" (2011)	"It Girl" (2011)	"Breathing" (2011)

"It Girl" is a song by American recording artist Jason Derulo, released as the second single from his second studio album, Future History on August 9, 2011. The song was written by Derulo, E. Kidd Bogart, Lindy Robbins and Emanuel "Eman" Kiriakou, who also handled the song's production. Musically, "It Girl" is a mid-tempo pop and R&B love song, that features a whistling intro and an acoustic guitar melody. Lyrically, it revolves around Derulo singing the praises of the perfect girl he found after searching all over.

The song received positive reviews from music critics, who praised its catchy production and radio-friendly lyrics. They also added that it has the potential to overshadow the commercial success of Derulo's debut single, "Whatcha Say" (2009). "It Girl" peaked at number 17 on the US Billboard Hot 100, number six on the US Hot Dance Club Songs chart, and at number 10 on the US Pop Songs chart. Outside of the United States, "It Girl" peaked within the top ten of the charts in Australia, Denmark, New Zealand, the Republic of Ireland, and the United Kingdom, and peaked within the top 20 of the charts in Hungary, Japan, the Netherlands, and Norway.

The accompanying music video of "It Girl" was directed by Colin Tilley and filmed at a mansion in Malibu, California. It portrays a fictional relationship between Derulo and his love interest played by actress Tika Sumpter. To promote the song, Derulo performed the song live on televised shows, including America's Got Talent, The Wendy Williams Show, The Ellen DeGeneres Show and The X Factor Australia. The official remix of the song premiered online in February 2012, and features Derulo's former girlfriend Jordin Sparks.

== Background and development ==
"It Girl" was written by Jason Derulo, E. Kidd Bogart, Lindy Robbins and Emanuel "Eman" Kiriakou, who also produced the track. The engineering process was handled by Jens Koerkmeier. It was mixed by Serban Ghenea at Mixstar Studios in Virginia Beach, Virginia. The song's keyboards, whistle, guitars, bass, percussion and drum programming were provided by Eman, with additional keyboards and drum programming by Koerkmeier and Andrew Goldstein. On July 29, 2011, the audio of "It Girl" was uploaded to Derulo's official YouTube account. When speaking of the song, Derulo told The Daily Telegraph, "I wanted to put myself in a position as if I'd found my It Girl, to make myself feel like if I found that one true love. I've basically described what it would be like if I found her." Derulo further elaborated about the concept of the song in another interview with Matt Elias of MTV News:

An 'It Girl' to me is someone who is selfless, someone who's always thinking about others before she thinks about herself. You know, my mom is a very charitable woman, so I'd want someone who is in line with that kind of thought process. I also like a girl who's polite. I feel like that's a lost art, and just saying 'please' and 'thank you' goes a very long way with me. That's just so lost these days. So, ladies, it's OK to say 'thank you.'

Derulo explained that he did not believe in the possibility of "It Girl" to be the next single from Future History. However, his peers believed that it was very distinct from the lead single, "Don't Wanna Go Home" and that response motivated him to pick it as the second single. He believed that showing the difference in the new album was important in picking the single. He did not want to put another dance song so that his fans do not assume that the entire album consisted of uptempo songs. He concluded that "growing up has definitely taken place. My music has always been a representation of who I am and I guess I speak differently, my demeanour is different."

== Composition ==
"It Girl"
A 20-second sample of "It Girl", which is a love ballad. Derulo serenades, ready to commit some serious time, shown in the line: "Loving you could be a crime[...] Give me 25 to life!", implying he is even ready to go to prison for the girl of his dreams.

"It Girl" is a mid-tempo pop and R&B love song, built on a finger-clicking beat. The song is set in common time with a moderate tempo of 95 beats per minute. It is composed in the key of E major with Derulo's vocal range spanning from the note of E_{3} to the note of B_{4}. According to Rap-Up, the song's lyrics find Derulo as the male protagonist singing praises of "a lovely lady", comparing her to his "greatest hit". "It Girl" opens with a whistling intro and an acoustic guitar melody. In the first verse, he chants about how he searched all over and finally found the girl of his dreams. He also affirms that the girl means much more than a Grammy Award to him. Its hook, which forms part of the chorus, contains the lyrics: "You could be my it girl / Baby, you're the shit girl / Lovin; you could be a crime / Crazy how we fit, girl / This is it, girl / Gimme 25 to life / I just wanna rock all night long and put you in the middle of my spotlight / You could be my it girl / You're my biggest hit, girl / Let me play it loud." Scott Shelter from Pop Crush noted that the song uses the "oh-oh-oh-oh" vocal chants after the chorus.

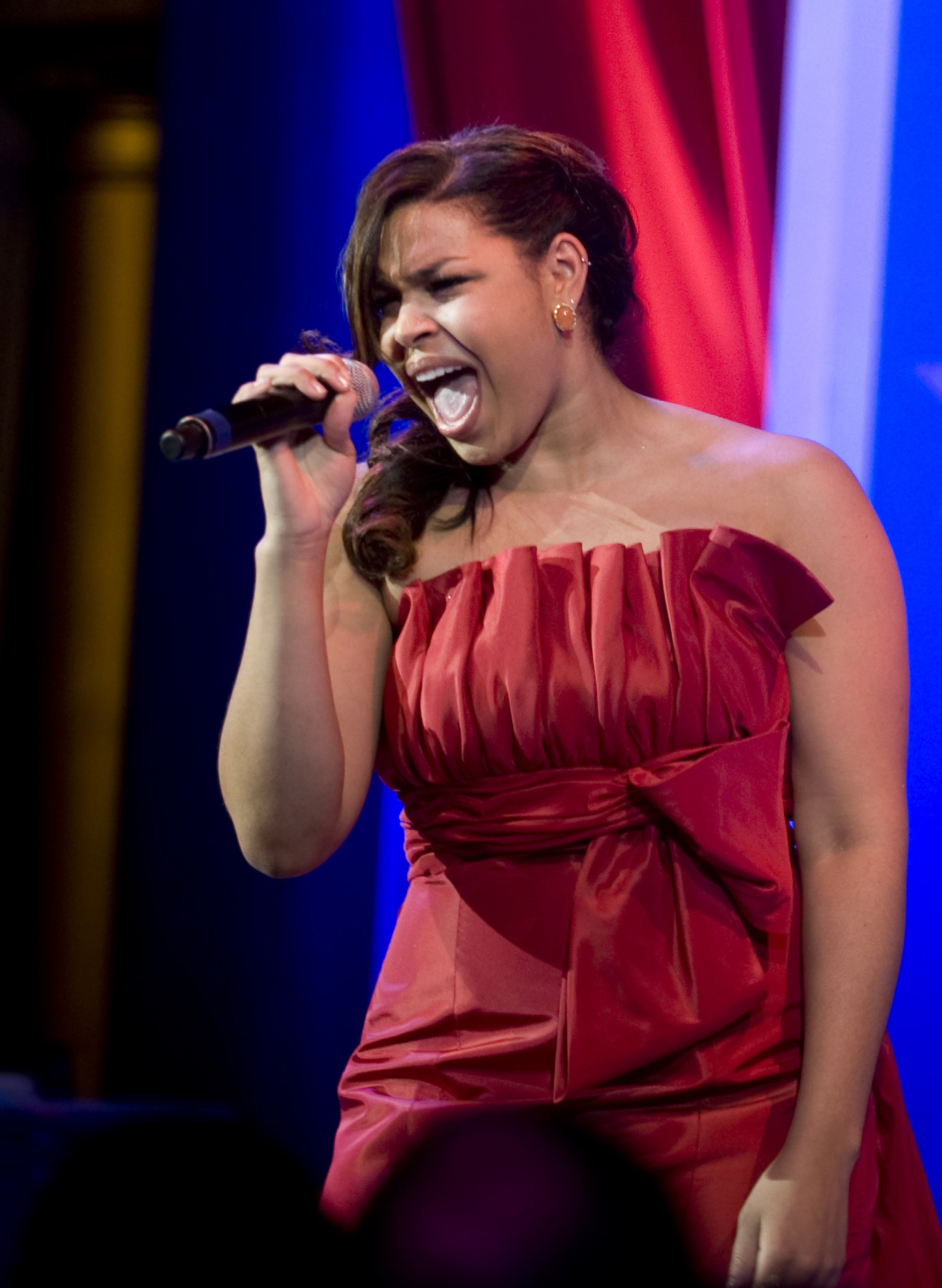
The official remix of "It Girl" features Derulo's girlfriend Jordin Sparks (pictured).

== Release ==
"It Girl" was added to the B-playlist of urban radio station BBC Radio 1Xtra in the United Kingdom on August 5, 2011. The song was released as a digital download on iTunes Stores worldwide from May 6, 2011. "It Girl" impacted contemporary hit radio in the United States on August 16, 2011, and mainstream radio in the UK on August 24, 2011. A digital extended play with four remixes of the song, was released in Denmark, Ireland, Switzerland and the United Kingdom on September 16, 2011. "It Girl" was made available as a CD single in Germany on November 25, 2011. On February 29, 2012, the official remix of "It Girl" premiered online, which features Derulo's former girlfriend Jordin Sparks. The remix has a slower tempo than the original and features a new verse by Sparks. Cristin Maher of PopCrush noted that both singers "harmonize together on the chorus, with their voices matching up beautifully". The remix was accompanied by a video that displays behind-the-scenes footage of Derulo and Sparks spending time together.

== Critical reception ==
"It Girl" garnered positive reviews from music critics. Describing it as "a catchy pop song with major hit potential", Scott Shetler of Pop Crush awarded "It Girl" four-and-a-half out of five stars, writing that "even though Derulo's debut produced hits like 'Whatcha Say' and 'In My Head', 'It Girl' could be his best single to date." Shetler concluded that "every element of the song works, from the sweet whistling intro to the acoustic guitar melody to the 'oh-oh-oh-oh' vocal chants after the chorus." Similarly, Jenna Hally Rubenstein of MTV, who viewed "It Girl" as Derulo's "valiant attempt to trump his monstrous [...] hit 'Whatcha Say', gave the song a positive review, writing that it is catchy and it is "perfectly crafted for radio success". Jess Holton of The Music Network noted that the song "delivers with catchy whistling and tender lyrics" and that it "will appeal to the lady fans of Derulo who like to see the romantic side of the crooner". Robbie Daw of Idolator wrote that the song "comes dangerously close to being just another bland, cookie cutter R&B-pop experience, but lucky for him, that whistle gimmick in the chorus makes it a somewhat enjoyable three minutes."

Kyle Anderson of Entertainment Weekly awarded the song a B− rating and wrote that "perhaps [Derulo] should have pitched woo with something hotter than a flat midtempo beat, some acoustic flourishes, and a whistle garnish." Shahryar Rizvi of Dallas Observer gave the song a mixed review, criticizing its lyrics: "[...] if you read between the lines in 'It Girl', it becomes clear that Derulo has some really weird taste in women." Lewis Corner of Digital Spy gave the song a negative review, "with the charts now welcoming the return of the organic singer-songwriter", Derulo may not have equipped enough himself with "his own gut-wrenching ballad."

== Chart performance ==
On the issue dated August 27, 2011, "It Girl" debuted at number 39 on the US Billboard Hot 100 chart, and fell to number 68 the following week. After descending the Hot 100 for three consecutive weeks, "It Girl" moved from number 61 to number 38 in its fifth week. It peaked at number 17 on the issue dated October 29, 2011. On the US Pop Songs chart, "It Girl" debuted at number 34 on the issue dated September 10, 2011. The song peaked at number 10 on the issue dated November 10, 2011, becoming Derulo's fourth top-ten single on the chart. "It Girl" peaked at number six on the US Hot Dance Club Songs chart, giving Derulo his second top-ten single on the chart. The song was certified platinum by the Recording Industry Association of America (RIAA), denoting sales of 1,000,000 copies.

In Canada, "It Girl" debuted at number 73 on the Canadian Hot 100 and peaked at 37.

In Australia, "It Girl" debuted at number 16 on the ARIA Singles Chart on August 22, 2011 – for the week ending date August 28, 2011 – becoming the highest debuting single of that week. The following week, the song peaked at number three, and at number one on the ARIA Urban Singles Chart. "It Girl" was certified six-times platinum by the Australian Recording Industry Association (ARIA), denoting shipments of 420,000 copies.

In New Zealand, the song debuted and peaked at number three on the New Zealand Singles Chart, becoming Derulo's highest debut in that country to date. It was certified double platinum by the Recorded Music NZ (RMNZ), denoting sales of 60,000 copies.

In Denmark, "It Girl" peaked at number nine on the Danish Singles Chart, giving Derulo his second top ten single Denmark.

In the Republic of Ireland, "It Girl" debuted and peaked at number three on the Irish Singles Chart on September 16, 2011 – for the week ending date September 22, 2011.

In the United Kingdom, "It Girl" debuted and peaked at number four on the UK Singles Chart on September 25, 2011 – for the week ending October 1, 2011 – becoming Derulo's fifth top ten song in Britain. It peaked at number two on the UK R&B Singles Chart.

== Music video ==
=== Background and development ===
The accompanying music video for "It Girl" was directed by Colin Tilley and shot at a mansion in Malibu, sitting on a cliff overlooking the Pacific Ocean. On July 19, 2011, several stills from the video were released online, and showed Derulo at the oceanside mansion dressed in a white suit. Gossip Girl actress, Tika Sumpter, also appeared in the photos, and plays Derulo's "It Girl" in the video. Derulo told MTV News that he wanted the video to look like an open book. He said,

I wanted it to be almost like a photo album, so every single scene is kind of like a picture that you're kind of looking into our relationship. So it is a 1920s vibe, it's black and white, very high fashion—you know, you'll see me very dapper in 1920s, Frank Sinatra-ish. So you'll see the cars from that era, you'll definitely feel the vibe of the house having that 1920s vibe as well. So it's very different and very intimate, and it's not a lot of dancing—it's more personal.

A behind-the-scenes footage from the video shoot showed Derulo wearing different outfits, including a dark pinstripe suit with a pair of sunglasses, a rose-colored button-down shirt and white pants. The footage also showed Derulo and Sumpter shooting a scene in a silver corvette, as well as a kissing scene between the two. A 37-second preview of the video was released on August 12, 2011. The completed video premiered online on August 15.

=== Synopsis and reception ===
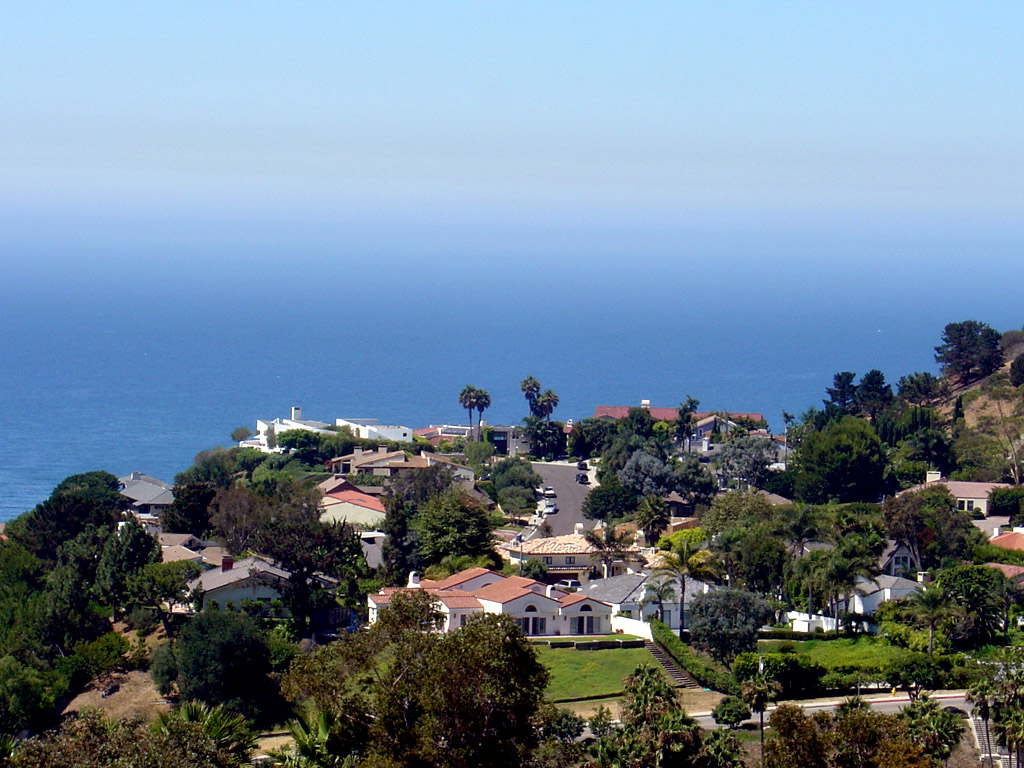
The music video was filmed in Malibu, California.

The beginning of the video is shot in black-and-white, and shows Derulo sitting on the hood of a corvette outside a Malibu mansion dressed in 1920s attire. In another scene, Derulo is seen dancing at an area of the mansion which is surrounded by trees. The video then shows intercut scenes in full color of Derulo at the beach, on the mansion's balcony, and in the bedroom with his love interest (played by Tika Sumpter). More scenes in full color, show Derulo on the balcony interacting with her, and also shows him singing to her in the bedroom using a microphone. During another scene, Derulo is seen dressed in all white. The video ends with a kissing scene between the two which then fades away.

Melinda Newman of HitFix praised the concept of the video, writing: "[...] when [Derulo is not] busy showing off his dance moves, he is living the high life with his lady in their palatial estate. He sings to her, she wraps her legs around him, they pose in some awesome topiary gardens. It is not the most thrilling of videos, and he may want to think twice about moonwalking in a video-- someone did it before him and better-- but it is a nice change of pace from some of his more hectic, gruffer clips." Cameron Matthews of AOL Music commented that the video gives "a kaleidoscopic view" between Derulo's beachfront paradise, an assortment of "edgy suits" and "a little bit of pillow talk with his new 'It Girl'." According to Jenna Hally Rubenstein of MTV, "the romance factor in Jason's full-length 'It Girl' video is very, very high."

== Live performances ==
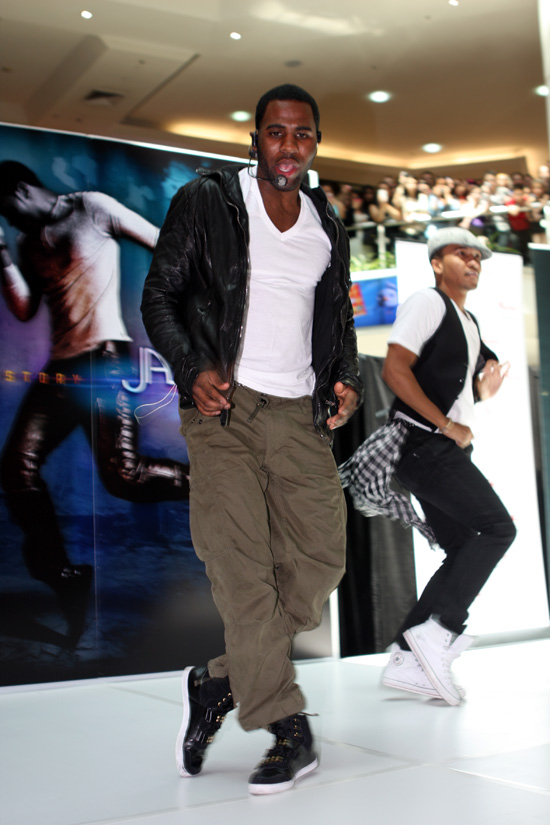
Derulo performing at the Westfield shopping mall in Parramatta, New South Wales, Australia.

On August 4, 2011, Derulo performed a medley of "It Girl" and "Don't Wanna Go Home" on America's Got Talent. Robbie Daw of Idolator compared his performance to Michael Jackson, writing "we're used to the 21-year-old [copying] MJ's legendary moves, especially on AGT. But why not stage some original shuffling of your own at some point, Jason?". He later sang the song on The Wendy Williams Show on September 30, 2011. During an Australian promotional tour for Future History, Derulo performed "It Girl" at the Westfield shopping mall in Parramatta, New South Wales, as part of a set list which included "In My Head" and "Don't Wanna Go Home". On October 18, 2011, he performed "It Girl" on The X Factor Australia. Derulo later performed the song on The Ellen DeGeneres Show on October 25, 2011.

On November 6, 2011, Derulo performed "It Girl" at the Belfast City Hall in Northern Ireland, United Kingdom to coincide with the 2011 MTV Europe Music Awards. The song was part of a set list which also included "Whatcha Say", "In My Head", "Don't Wanna Go Home" and "Breathing". On December 3, 2011, he performed "It Girl" at radio station KDWB-FM's annual Jingle Ball, which took place at the Target Center in Minneapolis, Minnesota. The song was part of a set list which included "Whatcha Say", "In My Head", "Ridin' Solo", "Don't Wanna Go Home" and "Fight for You". According to Jon Bream of Star Tribune Derulo "turned it out with sweet vocals and smooth dancing".

== Formats and track listings ==
- Digital download
1. "It Girl" – 3:12
- German CD single
1. "It Girl" (Album Version) – 3:12
2. "It Girl" (7th Heaven Club Mix) – 6:24
- Digital Remix EP
1. "It Girl" – 3:12
2. "It Girl" (Radio Version) – 3:11
3. "It Girl" (Ed Case Remix) – 4:34
4. "It Girl" (7th Heaven Club Mix) – 6:24
5. "It Girl" (R.A.W. Club Mix) – 6:52
6. "It Girl' (Ed Case Dub Mix) – 5:08

== Credits and personnel ==
Credits adapted from the liner notes for Future History.

- E. Kidd Bogart – songwriter
- Jason Desrouleaux – songwriter, lead vocals
- Serban Ghenea – mixer
- Andrew Goldstein – additional keyboards and drum programming
- John Hanes – mix engineer
- Emanuel "Eman" Kiriakou – songwriter, producer, keyboards, whistle, guitars, bass, percussion, drum programming
- Jens Koerkmeier – engineer, editing, additional keyboards and drum programming
- Lindy Robbins – songwriter
- Phil Seaford – assistant mix engineer

== Charts ==
=== Weekly charts ===
Weekly chart performance for "It Girl"
Chart (2011–12)	Peak position
Australia (ARIA)	3
Australia Urban (ARIA)	1
Austria (Ö3 Austria Top 40)	34
Belgium (Ultratop 50 Flanders)	32
Belgium (Ultratop 50 Wallonia)	39
Canada Hot 100 (Billboard)	34
Czech Republic Airplay (ČNS IFPI)	35
Denmark (Tracklisten)	9
France (SNEP)	30
Germany (GfK)	23
Hungary (Rádiós Top 40)	11
Ireland (IRMA)	3
Italy (FIMI)	13
Japan Hot 100 (Billboard)	13
Netherlands (Dutch Top 40)	19
Netherlands (Single Top 100)	42
Netherlands Urban (MegaCharts)	78
New Zealand (Recorded Music NZ)	3
Norway (VG-lista)	15
Scottish Singles Sales (Official Charts)	4
Slovakia Airplay (ČNS IFPI)	30
Sweden (Sverigetopplistan)	35
Switzerland (Schweizer Hitparade)	30
UK Singles (Official Charts)	4
UK Hip Hop/R&B (Official Charts)	2
US Billboard Hot 100	17
US Dance Club Songs (Billboard)	6
US Pop Airplay (Billboard)	10
US Rhythmic Airplay (Billboard)	14

=== Year-end charts ===
Annual chart rankings for "It Girl"
Chart (2011)	Rank
Australia (ARIA)	25
Australia Urban (ARIA)	6
Denmark (Tracklisten)	28
Italy (Musica e dischi)	85
Netherlands (Dutch Top 40)	89
New Zealand (Recorded Music NZ)	50
UK Singles (Official Charts Company)	109

== Certifications ==
Certifications and sales for "It Girl"
Region	Certification	Certified units/sales
Australia (ARIA)	6× Platinum	420,000^{^}
Italy (FIMI)	Gold	15,000^{*}
New Zealand (RMNZ)	2× Platinum	60,000^{‡}
United Kingdom (BPI)	Platinum	600,000^{‡}
United States (RIAA)	Platinum	1,000,000^{*}
Streaming
Denmark (IFPI Danmark)	Platinum	900,000^{†}
^{*} Sales figures based on certification alone.^{^} Shipments figures based on certification alone.^{‡} Sales+streaming figures based on certification alone.^{†} Streaming-only figures based on certification alone.

== Release history ==
Street dates for "It Girl"
Region	Date	Format	Label
United Kingdom	August 5, 2011	Urban radio	Beluga Heights; Warner Bros.
Belgium	August 9, 2011	Digital download	Beluga Heights; Warner Bros.
Canada	August 9, 2011	Digital download	Beluga Heights; Warner Bros.
Denmark	August 9, 2011	Digital download	Beluga Heights; Warner Bros.
Finland	August 9, 2011	Digital download	Beluga Heights; Warner Bros.
Ireland	August 9, 2011	Digital download	Beluga Heights; Warner Bros.
Italy	August 9, 2011	Digital download	Beluga Heights; Warner Bros.
Netherlands	August 9, 2011	Digital download	Beluga Heights; Warner Bros.
New Zealand	August 9, 2011	Digital download	Beluga Heights; Warner Bros.
Norway	August 9, 2011	Digital download	Beluga Heights; Warner Bros.
Sweden	August 9, 2011	Digital download	Beluga Heights; Warner Bros.
United States	August 9, 2011	Digital download	Beluga Heights; Warner Bros.
Australia	August 15, 2011	Digital download	Beluga Heights; Warner Bros.
United States	August 16, 2011	Contemporary hit radio	Beluga Heights; Warner Bros.
United Kingdom	August 24, 2011	Mainstream radio	Beluga Heights; Warner Bros.
Denmark	September 16, 2011	Digital remix extended play	Beluga Heights; Warner Bros.
Ireland	September 16, 2011	Digital remix extended play	Beluga Heights; Warner Bros.
Switzerland	September 16, 2011	Digital remix extended play	Beluga Heights; Warner Bros.
United Kingdom	September 16, 2011	Digital remix extended play	Beluga Heights; Warner Bros.
Germany	November 25, 2011	CD single	Beluga Heights; Warner Bros.
