= Fight for You (Jason Derulo song) =

Single by Jason Derulo

from the album Future History
- Released: December 2, 2011
- Recorded: July 2010: Serenity West Recording Studio; Jim Henson Studios (Los Angeles; California)
- Genre: Urban pop
- Length: 4:02
- Label: Beluga Heights; Warner Bros.
- Songwriters: Jason Desrouleaux; Stevie Hoang; David Paich; Jeff Porcaro
- Producers: RedOne; BeatGeek; Geo Slam

Jason Derulo singles chronology
"Test Drive" (2011)	"Fight for You" (2011)	"Undefeated" (2012)

"Fight for You" is a song originally recorded by Stevie Hoang, featuring Iyaz, for his third independent album, Unsigned (2011). It was later performed by American recording artist Jason Derulo, released as the fourth single from his second studio album, Future History, on December 2, 2011. The song was written by Derulo, Hoang, David Paich and Jeff Porcaro, while production was handled by RedOne, BeatGeek and Geo Slam. Musically, "Fight for You" is an urban-pop ballad, that interpolates the song "Africa" by American rock band Toto. The lyrics revolve around how Derulo, the protagonist, has "got a girl in his life he isn't ready to let go of just yet". Hoang had originally recorded "Fight for You" for his third independent album Unsigned (2011) featuring Iyaz.

The song's production and Derulo's vocal performance garnered positive reviews from music critics, however, some criticized its lack of originality. "Fight for You" attained moderate chart success, peaking at number five in Australia, and reaching the top twenty in the United Kingdom. The accompanying music video portrays a fictional relationship between Derulo and his love interest. Derulo performed the song at KDWB-FM's annual Jingle Ball in 2011.

== Jason Derulo version ==
"Fight for You" was written by Jason Derulo, Stevie Hoang, David Paich and Jeff Porcaro, while production of the song was helmed by RedOne, BeatGeek and Geo Slam.

Derulo's version of "Fight for You" was recorded and engineered by Gelly Kusuma, Slam and Teddy Sky at Serenity West Recording Studio and Jim Henson Studios in Los Angeles, California. Derulo, RedOne, Laila Khayat, Samya Khayat and Sky performed background vocals on the song. The recordings were later mixed by Trevor Muzzy. All instruments and programming were provided by RedOne, BeatGeek and Slam. In a cover story for the Daily Star, Derulo stated that "Fight for You" was the first song he worked on with RedOne, saying "I'm glad it turned out so dope". On working with RedOne, he said: "Red first became hot when he produced the album The Fame with Lady Gaga. He is one of the nicest guys I've ever met. ... RedOne was a nice, humble, down-to-earth, special person".

"Fight for You" was added to mainstream radio playlists in the United Kingdom on November 9, 2011. A digital extended play, featuring four remixes of the song, was released in Ireland and the UK on December 2, 2011.

== Composition ==
"Fight for You"
A 26-second sample of the chorus of "Fight for You", which interpolates the song "Africa" by American rock band Toto.

"Fight for You" is an urban-pop ballad with a length of four minutes and two seconds. According to Meena Rupani of DesiHits, the song finds Derulo as the male protagonist singing "that he's got a girl in his life he isn't ready to let go of just yet". The song contains an interpolation of the 1982 song "Africa" by American rock band Toto. Lewis Corner of Digital Spy noted that "Fight for You" features "airy synths and bouncy castle-sized beats". During an interview with New! magazine, Derulo explained the concept of "Fight for You", saying: "It's very relationship-based and the line ["fight for you"] means so much, whatever you believe in you should go for. The song is based on a personal experience, I was in a relationship and I put myself in that place again where you would do anything to keep the relationship together so I went back to that place."

== Critical reception ==
"Fight for You" garnered positive reviews from music critics for its catchy production and Derulo's vocal performance. David Griffiths of 4Music called it a "catchy little ditty" that "is guaranteed to be stuck in your head for the rest of the day". Shawn Kitchener of Entertainment Wise described the song as "the kind of sweet-as-candy R&B fodder" that could have been featured on the High School Musical soundtrack. Meena Rupani of DesiHits noted that the song's lyrical theme is similar to "It Girl", and that Derulo's "vocals are enough to put any girl into a trance". However, "Fight for You" also received unfavorable reviews from critics because of its lack of originality. Lewis Corner of Digital Spy gave the song a three out of five star rating, calling Derulo "extremely lazy" for sampling "Africa". Caroline Sullivan of The Guardian described the song as "languid", while writing that the sample gives it "a bit of bounce". Although Jess Holton of The Music Network described "Fight for You" as a "touching ballad", she added that sampling "Africa" does not do the latter "any form of justice". In an album review of Future History, Michael Cragg of BBC Music noted that the songs "revolve around the joys of being in a relationship or the pain of not being in one", however disapproved of the lyrical content and sample in "Fight for You", calling it "perhaps the worst offender" on the album.

== Commercial performance ==
After the release of Future History, "Fight for You" debuted and peaked on the US Billboard Hot 100 at number 83 on the issue dated October 15, 2011, and on the UK Singles Chart at number 117 on October 22, 2011. Upon its release as a single in the latter country, "Fight for You" managed to peak at number 15 on the UK Singles Chart, and at number four on the UK R&B Singles Chart. In Ireland, the song debuted at number 31 on December 1, 2011, and peaked at number 28 the following week. On the Danish Singles Chart, "Fight for You" debuted and peaked at number 27 on January 20, 2012. In Australia, the song debuted at number 27 on the ARIA Singles Chart on February 20, 2012. "Fight for You" peaked at number five in its third week, and spent a total of seven consecutive weeks inside the top-ten. It was eventually certified triple platinum by the Australian Recording Industry Association (ARIA), denoting 210,000 equivalent units.

== Promotion ==
=== Music video ===
The video for "Fight for You" premiered online on November 25, 2011. It begins with Derulo walking on a bridge in a city at night, before the video cuts to scenes of Derulo and his love interest hugging and drinking alcohol, as well showing him standing alone atop a roof of a building in Manhattan. Another scene finds Derulo and his love interest sharing a shower. The video continues to show the pair spending time together, including dining in restaurants, riding the subway, and dancing on the subway platform. David Greenwald of MTV Buzzworthy called it Derulo's "steamiest" video to date.

=== Live performances and cover version ===
On December 3, 2011, Derulo performed "Fight for You" at radio station KDWB-FM's annual Jingle Ball, which took place at the Target Center in Minneapolis, Minnesota. The song was part of a set list, which included "Whatcha Say", "In My Head", "Ridin' Solo", "Don't Wanna Go Home" and "It Girl". According to Jon Bream of the Star Tribune, Derulo "turned it out with sweet vocals and smooth dancing". On May 21, 2012, Taga Paa performed a cover of "Fight for You" on The Voice Australia. Rosemarie Lentini of The Daily Telegraph called it a "moving rendition", while Seanna Cronin of The Gympie Times noted that Paa's performance "had a few pitch issues".

== Track listing ==
- Digital EP
1. "Fight for You" – 4:02
2. "Fight for You" (Suncycle Remix) – 3:34
3. "Fight for You" (Mync Edit) – 3:25
4. "Fight for You" (Mync Stadium Dub) – 5:34
5. "Fight for You" (Mync Stadium Mix) – 5:34

== Credits and personnel ==
Credits adapted from the liner notes for Future History.

- BeatGeek – production, instruments and programming
- Jason Derulo – songwriting, lead vocals, background vocals
- Stevie Hoang – songwriting
- Laila Khayat – background vocals
- Samya Khayat – background vocals
- Gelly Kusuma – recording, engineering
- Trevor Muzzy – mixing
- David F. Paich – songwriting
- Jeffrey T. Porcaro – songwriting
- RedOne – production, background vocals, instruments and programming
- Teddy Sky – recording, engineering, background vocals
- Geo Slam – production, recording, engineering, instruments and programming, guitar

== Charts and certifications ==
=== Weekly charts ===
Chart (2011–12)	Peak position
Australian Singles Chart	5
Australian Urban Singles Chart	4
Danish Singles Chart	27
Irish Singles Chart	28
Italy (FIMI)	21
Scottish Singles Chart	16
UK R&B Singles Chart	4
UK Singles Chart	15
US Billboard Hot 100	83

=== Year-end charts ===
Chart (2012)	Position
Australian Singles Chart	64
Australian Urban Singles Chart	17

=== Certifications ===
Region	Certification	Certified units/sales
Australia (ARIA)	3× Platinum	210,000^{‡}
United Kingdom (BPI)	Silver	200,000^{‡}
Streaming
Denmark (IFPI Danmark)	Gold	450,000^{†}
^{‡} Sales+streaming figures based on certification alone.^{†} Streaming-only figures based on certification alone.

== Release history ==
Region	Date	Format
United Kingdom	November 9, 2011	Mainstream radio
Ireland	December 2, 2011	Digital remix extended play
United Kingdom	December 2, 2011	Digital remix extended play
