= Emanuel Kiriakou =

American songwriter

- Born: Emanuel Steve Kiriakou; August 16, 1966 (age 60); New Castle, Pennsylvania, U.S.
- Genres: Pop rock; pop; acoustic; R&B; hip hop
- Occupations: Record producer; songwriter; musician; vocalist
- Label: Universal
- Spouse: Aliki Theofilopoulos (m. 2020)

Emanuel Steve "Eman" Kiriakou (born August 16, 1966) is a Greek-American songwriter, producer, record executive, music publisher and multi-instrumentalist, based in Los Angeles. He recently co-wrote and produced "Take You Dancing" by Jason Derulo, and has produced a number of Billboard Hot 100 charting singles including: "What's Left of Me" by Nick Lachey, "Crush" by David Archuleta, "Who Says" by Selena Gomez & the Scene, and "Tonight Tonight" by Hot Chelle Rae, which was #1 on the Billboard Hot AC charts, "It Girl" by Jason Derulo, as well as "Classic" and "American Dream" by MKTO. He has also collaborated with Celine Dion, Ne-Yo, MKTO, Demi Lovato, Selena Gomez, ZAYN, Gabby Barrett, Rachel Platten, David Foster, Madison Beer, Robert DeLong, Whitney Houston, Simple Plan, and Backstreet Boys. He is also the younger brother of John Kiriakou.

== Early life ==
Kiriakou began playing with the guitar and piano at the age of 5, and joined his father's Greek band at the age of fourteen. He credits this time in his father's band as his real musical education. He graduated from Youngstown State University's Dana School of Music, in Youngstown, Ohio, with a degree in music, and then relocated to Minneapolis, Minnesota, where he won a Cleo Award for a Miller Lite television commercial. After relocating to New York City, he linked up with Joey McIntyre and produced his second solo record, "Meet Joe Mac". Kiriakou lives in Los Angeles with his wife, the animator and actress Aliki Theofilopoulos. Kiriakou's brother is the former CIA operative and whistleblower John Kiriakou.

== Career ==
Kiriakou moved to Los Angeles in 2004, where he worked closely with record producer and songwriter Walter Afanasieff.

Kiriakou co-wrote and produced Jason Derulo's single "It Girl". He also co-wrote and produced the first single for Selena Gomez & the Scene titled "Who Says", co-wrote and produced Hot Chelle Rae's "Tonight Tonight" and co-wrote and produced "Fix a Heart" which appears on Demi Lovato's third studio album, Unbroken.

Kiriakou also co-produced the title track on Whitney Houston's record entitled "I Look To You". He co-wrote and produced the first single on David Archuleta's record titled "Crush" which debuted at #2 on Billboard, the highest American Idol debut to date, receiving 1.8 million downloads and has been certified double platinum. Kiriakou's multi-format single for Nick Lachey's "What's Left of Me" hit top 10 on the pop Billboard chart and #1 on the Dance Chart.

Kiriakou's music has been featured in television shows and major motion picture soundtracks, including the award-winning My Big Fat Greek Wedding. He co-produced the Demi Lovato version of "Let It Go" from the movie Frozen with his production partner Andrew Goldstein. He has worked with chart-topping artists Demi Lovato ("Fix A Heart", "In Case", "Warrior" and "Something That We're Not" Selena Gomez, Celine Dion ('Incredible"), Backstreet Boys, Robert DeLong, MKTO, and Ne-Yo.

Kiriakou partnered with Evan Kidd Bogart in 2011 to form their label and publishing companies, Crooked Paintings and Cre8ive Co., which specialize in creative/A&R services and artist development. The first and most notable signings on their roster are pop-duo MKTO, and electronic artist, FRND. Most recently, Kiriakou cowrote and co-produced Jason Derulo's current single, "Take You Dancing". He is also in production for the Struts' third studio album.

== Selected discography ==
=== Singles, EPs, and albums ===
- Jason Derulo - "Take You Dancing" (2020), "It Girl" - Single (2011)
- MKTO - "Classic" - Single (2013), MKTO - Album (2012), "Bad Girls" - EP (2015), "How Can I Forget" - Single (2018), and others
- ZAYN - "Fresh Air" from Icarus Falls Album (2018)
- Louis The Child - "Last To Leave" - Single (2017)
- Whitney Houston - "I Look to You" - Single (2009)
- Demi Lovato - Unbroken - Album (2011), Demi - Album (2013), "Let It Go" - Single (2013)
- Selena Gomez and the Scene - "Who Says" - Single (2011)
- Celine Dion - "Surprise Surprise" from Taking Chances Album (2007), "There Comes A Time" from My Love: Essential Collection Album (2008), Loved Me Back to Life - Album (2013)
- Jordin Sparks - Jordin Sparks - Album (2007)
- Hot Chelle Rae - "Tonight Tonight" - Single (2011), "I Like It Like That" - Single (2011), Whatever - Album (2011)
- Bridgit Mendler - "Ready or Not" - Single (2012), Hello My Name Is… - Album (2012)
- Vanessa Hudgens - "Gone With The Wind" from Identified Album (2008)
- Rachel Platten - Wildfire - Album (2016)
- Bea Miller - Not an Apology - Album (2015)
- Olivia Holt - Olivia - EP (2016)
- Andy Grammer - "Grow" from The Good Parts Album (2017)
- Backstreet Boys - "Shattered" from This Is Us Album (2009), "Inconsolable" - Single (2007), "Downpour" from Unbreakable Album (2007)
- NKOTB - "2 in the Morning" - Single (2008)
- NKOTBSB - "Don't Turn Out the Lights" - Single (2011)
- Cody Simpson - "Summertime of Our Lives" from Surfer's Paradise Album (2013)
- Ne-Yo - "Shut Me Down" from R.E.D. Album (2012)
- Kris Allen / Adam Lambert - "No Boundaries" - Single (2009)
- David Archuleta - "Crush" - Single (2008), The Other Side of Down - Album (2010)
- Katharine McPhee - Katharine McPhee - Album (2007)
- Nick Lachey - "What's Left of Me" - Single (2006)
- Robert DeLong - "Long Way Down" from In The Cards - Album (2015)
- Jesse & Joy - "Run" from Jesse & Joy - Album (2017)
- Westlife - Where We Are - Album (2009)
- Friday Night Boys - Off The Deep End - Album (2009)
- Yelawolf - "Made In The U.S.A." from Radioactive Album (2011)
- Simple Plan - "Summer Paradise" - Single (2011)
- The Mowgli's - "Say It Just Say It" from Waiting For The Dawn Album (2013)
- Joey McIntyre - Meet Joe Mac - Album (2001), One Too Many - Album (2002), 8:09 - Album (2004)

=== Film soundtracks and scores ===
- "Phineas & Ferb The Movie: Candace Against The Universe" (Original Soundtrack) | Sarah Hudson - "Girls Day Out" (2020)
- "My Big Fat Greek Wedding" - Original Greek Music (2002)
