= Undefeated (Jason Derulo song) =

Single by Jason Derulo

from the album Future History: Platinum Edition
- Released: May 22, 2012
- Recorded: April 2012
- Length: 3:36
- Label: Warner Bros.
- Songwriter(s): Jason Desrouleaux; Justin Franks; James 'JHart' Abrahart
- Producer(s): DJ Frank E

Jason Derulo singles chronology
"Fight for You" (2011)	"Undefeated" (2012)	"Pick Up the Pieces" (2012)

"Undefeated" is a song by American recording artist Jason Derulo, produced by DJ Frank E and released on May 22, 2012, as the first single from the platinum edition of Future History (2011).

== Background ==
The track was written with the help of American Idol viewers throughout Season 11 of the show. The creation of the song was promoted through Coca-Cola's "Perfect Harmony" program where, throughout the season, American Idol viewers were invited to contribute parts of the lyrics to a tune offered online, making the song a true collaborative effort by a big number of people. After four submission and voting phases and thousands of lyric submissions, contributions were edited and the eventual final version performed by Derulo and tipped as part of his "healing process" after he suffered an accident that left him in a neck brace for many months.

The single pays homage to the Coca-Cola brand, evidenced by a variation of the brand's iconic 5-note-jingle repeated throughout the song and the stylised design of the cover art which appears much like the top of a beverage can. In an interview with American Idol host Ryan Seacrest on the latter's radio show, Derulo described the writing process as follows: "The fans got to help me write the song. I started writing the song, but I left a bunch of lines blank and the fans have been helping me fill in the lines. There were lots of great, great lines. It made the process a little difficult. Thankfully, I had a lot of help to whittle it down to a number that I could actually look at. There were tons and tons of great stuff, but we got it down and I believe we came up with the best product!"

== Live performances ==
Derulo performed the song live for the first time on May 22, 2012, during the second final of the American Idol competition. It was later made available for download on the same day. 10,000 free downloads of the song were made available through the official American Idol website. Immediately prior to his live performance, Derulo sent a message via his Twitter account: "First time performing since my neck injury tonight on Idol finale! Thank you to the fans that help[ed] me write this song #UNDEFEATED. It's been two weeks since I took my neck brace off! Still gonna make it happen tonight! NEVER GIVE UP! NEVER LET UP!"

== Track listing ==
- Digital download
1. "Undefeated" – 3:36
- German CD single
1. "Undefeated" – 3:36
2. "Undefeated" (Michael Mind Project Remix) – 6:14

== Charts and certifications ==
=== Weekly charts ===
Chart (2012)	Peak position
Australian Singles Chart	14
Australian Urban Singles Chart	5
Ireland (IRMA)	35
New Zealand Singles Chart	26
US Billboard Hot 100	90

=== Certifications ===
Region	Certification	Certified units/sales
Australia (ARIA)	Gold	35,000^{^}
^{^} Shipments figures based on certification alone.
