= Don't Wanna Go Home =

Single by Jason Derulo

from the album Future History
- Released: May 23, 2011
- Recorded: 2010
- Studio: Serenity West Recording Studio; (Los Angeles; California)
- Genre: Dance-pop; electropop
- Length: 3:25
- Label: Beluga Heights; Warner Bros.
- Songwriters: Jason Desrouleaux; Chaz Mishan; David Delazyn; William Attaway; Irving Burgie; Allen George; Fred McFarlane
- Producers: The Fliptones; Tim Roberts; Heather Jeanette

Jason Derulo singles chronology
"The Sky's the Limit" (2010)	"Don't Wanna Go Home" (2011)	"It Girl" (2011)

Music video
- "Don't Wanna Go Home" on YouTube

"Don't Wanna Go Home" is a song by American recording artist Jason Derulo, released as the lead single from his second studio album, Future History, on May 23, 2011. The song was written by Derulo, Chaz Mishan, David Delazyn, William Attaway, Irving Burgie, Allen George and Fred McFarlane. It was produced by The Fliptones. The song is an up-tempo electropop and dance-pop song that samples Robin S.' 1993 single "Show Me Love" and incorporates an interpolation of Harry Belafonte's 1956 single, "Day-O (The Banana Boat Song)".

"Don't Wanna Go Home" received mixed reviews; some music critics praised its production and lyrics, while others claimed it lacked originality. In the United States, "Don't Wanna Go Home" peaked at number fourteen on the Billboard Hot 100 chart, and at number four on the Hot Dance Club Songs chart. It also attained top 20 positions across Europe and in Australia and New Zealand. In the United Kingdom, "Don't Wanna Go Home" debuted at number one on the UK Singles Chart, becoming Derulo's second consecutive number-one single in Britain following "In My Head" (2010). The accompanying music video was directed by Rich Lee, and features Derulo in various dance sequences and a cameo appearance by Melody Thornton.

== Background and composition ==
"Don't Wanna Go Home" was written by Jason Derulo, Chaz Mishan, David Delazyn, William Attaway, Irving Burgie, Allen George and Fred McFarlane. Production for the song was handled by The Fliptones, with additional production by Tim Roberts and Heather Jeanette. It was recorded at Serenity West Recording Studio in Los Angeles, California and was mixed by Serban Ghenea at Mixstar Studios in Virginia Beach, Virginia. On May 3, 2011, a 34-second preview of the song premiered online and its cover art was also unveiled. "Don't Wanna Go Home" was sent to contemporary hit radios in the United States on May 10, and was released for digital download on May 20.

"Don't Wanna Go Home"
A 23-second sample of part of the chorus of "Don't Wanna Go Home", which is partially constructed from lyrics of "Day-O (The Banana Boat Song)".

"Don't Wanna Go Home" is an up-tempo electropop, dance-pop, and EDM song. "Don't Wanna Go Home" makes use of a thumping Euro disco beat and some Auto-Tune vocals. Its hook features the lyrics, "Day-o, me say day-o / Daylight come and we don't wanna go home", as it is partially constructed from lyrics of "Day-O (The Banana Boat Song)" by Harry Belafonte, while a sample of "Show Me Love" by Robin S. runs throughout the song. In an interview with MTV UK, Derulo commented on the "Show Me Love" sample: "I'm in love with that bassline, it's just really hypnotic and I just wanted to play around with it in the studio. I heard it a bunch of times in the club and I fell in love with it, like most people do." Meena Rupani from DesiHits noted that the song borrows lyrics from Lil Wayne, while Shahryar Rizvi from Dallas Observer noted that its pre-chorus line "from the window / to the wall" comes from Lil Jon's 2003 single "Get Low".

== Critical reception ==
"Don't Wanna Go Home" received mixed reviews from music critics. Bill Lamb from About.com awarded "Don't Wanna Go Home" a rating of four stars out of five, praising the song's "ingratiating party mood" and Derulo's "energetic vocal performance". He also went on to say that "Jason Derulo should have no problem taking back his place on pop radio playlists and pulling the Beluga Heights sound back into the spotlight." Scott Shelter from PopCrush wrote that, "Despite the track's lack of originality, the beat is irresistible, and its lyrics about staying out all night are likely to resonate with summer partiers," and concluded by writing that it is "a song that succeeds in spite of its shortcomings." A writer for Beatweek magazine praised Derulo for sampling "Day-O" into the song's chorus, writing that "'Don't Wanna Go Home' is yet the latest evidence that Derulo can create a song in any genre, using any kind of samples, and turn it into a hit."

Robbie Daw from Idolator wrote that, "Compared to his last few mediocre offerings, this single actually seems to have some fire" courtesy of the samples in the song. However, Daw concluded by writing that "if Derulo wants to achieve any kind of credibility in the pop world, he'd better establish his own sound fast." Meena Rupani from DesiHits felt that Derulo "should think twice before he takes his lyrics from others." Shahryar Rizvi from Dallas Observer called Derulo a "lousy sampler", writing that "all this song boasts is Derulo throwing airballs". At the 2011 Teen Choice Awards, "Don't Wanna Go Home" was nominated for 'Choice R&B/Hip Hop Track' accolade.

== Chart performance ==
During the week of May 28, 2011, "Don't Wanna Go Home" debuted at number 39 on the US Pop Songs chart, and peaked at number ten on July 16, 2011. On the US Billboard Hot 100 chart, "Don't Wanna Go Home" debuted at number 92 during the week of June 4, 2011, and peaked at number 14 on July 2, 2011. The song also reached number four on the US Hot Dance Club Songs chart. "Don't Wanna Go Home" was certified gold by the Recording Industry Association of America (RIAA), denoting sales of 500,000 copies. As of September 2011, the song has sold over 1,000,000 digital copies in the US. In Canada, "Don't Wanna Go Home" debuted at number 24 on the Canadian Hot 100 during the week of June 11, 2011, and later peaked at number eight on July 23, 2011. The song was certified gold by Music Canada (MC), denoting sales of 40,000 digital copies.

In Australia, "Don't Wanna Go Home" debuted at number 34 on the ARIA Singles Chart on May 29, 2011, serving as the highest debuting single of that week. It later peaked at number five for two consecutive weeks. "Don't Wanna Go Home" also peaked at number two on the ARIA Urban Singles Chart. The song was certified five times platinum by the Australian Recording Industry Association (ARIA), denoting sales of 350,000 copies. On the New Zealand Singles Chart, "Don't Wanna Go Home" debuted at number 33 on May 30, 2011, and peaked at number 17 on June 27, 2011, and spent a total of twelve weeks on the chart.

The song also attained top-ten positions on the Austrian Singles Chart and Irish Singles Chart, both at number eight.

In the United Kingdom, "Don't Wanna Go Home" debuted at the top of the UK Singles Chart on June 26, 2011 – for the week ending date July 2, 2011 – selling 76,581 copies in its first week, becoming Derulo's second chart-topping song in Britain following "In My Head" in February 2010. The song remained at the top of the UK Singles Chart for two weeks.

== Music video ==
The accompanying music video for "Don't Wanna Go Home" was directed by Rich Lee and filmed in early May 2011. During the video shoot, Derulo spoke to MTV News about the video's concept, saying, "Basically, [it's] not about going to the club, [it's about] never leaving the club. [The video features] these creatures who can't get enough of this amazing party. But it's not a club – it's a warehouse and we live here." On May 23, 2011, a 30-second teaser of the music video was released online, showing Derulo dancing with former Pussycat Dolls member, Melody Thornton. The video premiered on MTV on May 25, 2011.

The video opens in an industrial warehouse, and shows Derulo reclining on a couch while his friends are passed out beside, around and on top of him. As he sings a portion of the song's chorus, Derulo reminisces about the previous night. The scene then shifts to Thornton, who is still awake standing on the other side of the warehouse surrounded by smoke. Derulo then stands up and walks towards her while performing solo dance moves. During the chorus, the two begin to do sexual dance routines together and eventually everyone wakes up. Derulo can then be seen doing various choreographed routines with male and female back-up dancers, as the crowd surrounding them hold up flashlights. In the final scene, a fire sprinkler in the warehouse goes off, and Derulo and his female dancers continue dancing. Towards the end of the video, the crowd ends up dancing with each other, while Derulo dances with a female. A writer for MTV News commented that the video could have easily starred Kesha, Jennifer Lopez or Britney Spears, and described it as being "glossy and fun, a complete reflection of the tune's party-anthem vibe."

== Live performances ==
On August 3, 2011, Derulo performed a medley of "Don't Wanna Go Home" and "It Girl" on America's Got Talent, dressed in a white singlet and black jeans. He also performed the song at the 2011 Teen Choice Awards on August 7 with a troop of dancers. For the performance, Derulo wore a black leather jacket, T-shirt, skinny jeans and black leather gloves. On September 29, Derulo made a guest appearance on Live with Regis and Kelly to perform "Don't Wanna Go Home" and "It Girl". During a promotional tour in Australia, he performed the song at the Westfield Parramatta shopping centre in Parramatta, Sydney on October 16. He also performed a medley of "Don't Wanna Go Home" and "It Girl" on The X Factor Australia on October 18.

== Track listing ==
- Digital download
1. "Don't Wanna Go Home" – 3:25
- CD single
1. "Don't Wanna Go Home" – 3:25
2. "Don't Wanna Go Home" (Club Junkies Club Mix) – 7:07
- UK Digital EP
1. "Don't Wanna Go Home" – 3:25
2. "Don't Wanna Go Home" (Club Junkies Club Mix) – 7:07
3. "Don't Wanna Go Home" (Club Junkies Radio Mix) – 3:42
4. "Don't Wanna Go Home" (7th Heaven Club Mix) – 7:54
5. "Don't Wanna Go Home" (7th Heaven Radio Edit) – 4:04

== Credits and personnel ==
Credits adapted from the liner notes for Future History.

- William Attaway – songwriting
- Irving Burgie – songwriting
- David Delazyn – songwriting, production
- Jason Desrouleaux – songwriting, lead vocals
- The Fliptones – production
- Allen George – songwriting
- Serban Ghenea – mixing
- John Hanes – mix engineering
- Heather Jeanette – additional production
- Gelly Kusuma – recording
- Fred McFarlane – songwriting
- Chaz Mishan – songwriting, production
- Tim Roberts – additional production, assistant mix engineering
- Sidney Swift – assistant engineering

== Charts ==
=== Weekly charts ===
Chart (2011)	Peak position
Australia (ARIA)	5
Australia Urban (ARIA)	2
Austria (Ö3 Austria Top 40)	8
Belgium (Ultratop 50 Flanders)	39
Belgium (Ultratop 50 Wallonia)	36
Canada Hot 100 (Billboard)	8
Czech Airplay Chart	43
Denmark (Tracklisten)	12
France (SNEP)	23
Germany (GfK)	11
Hungary (Rádiós Top 40)	6
Ireland (IRMA)	8
Israel (Media Forest)	2
Italy (FIMI)	37
Luxembourg Digital Songs	9
Mexico Anglo (Monitor Latino)	20
Netherlands (Dutch Top 40)	12
Netherlands (Single Top 100)	28
New Zealand (Recorded Music NZ)	17
Scottish Singles Sales (Official Charts)	1
Slovak Airplay Chart	13
Spanish Airplay Chart	7
Spain (Promusicae)	17
Sweden (Sverigetopplistan)	37
Switzerland (Schweizer Hitparade)	18
UK R&B Singles Chart	1
UK Singles (Official Charts)	1
US Billboard Hot 100	14
US Adult Pop Airplay (Billboard)	37
US Dance Club Songs (Billboard)	4
US Pop Airplay (Billboard)	10

=== Year-end charts ===
Chart (2011)	Position
Australia (ARIA)	34
Austria (Ö3 Austria Top 40)	52
Brazil (Crowley)	51
Canada (Canadian Hot 100)	53
Germany (Official German Charts)	52
Netherlands (Dutch Top 40)	68
Switzerland (Schweizer Hitparade)	69
UK Singles (Official Charts Company)	47
US Billboard Hot 100	87
US Dance Club Songs (Billboard)	50

== Certifications ==
Region	Certification	Certified units/sales
Australia (ARIA)	5× Platinum	350,000^{^}
Austria (IFPI Austria)	Gold	15,000^{*}
Canada (Music Canada)	Platinum	80,000^{*}
Denmark (IFPI Danmark)	Gold	45,000^{‡}
Germany (BVMI)	Gold	150,000^{^}
Switzerland (IFPI Switzerland)	Gold	15,000^{^}
United Kingdom (BPI)	Platinum	600,000^{‡}
United States (RIAA)	Platinum	1,000,000^{‡}
^{*} Sales figures based on certification alone.^{^} Shipments figures based on certification alone.^{‡} Sales+streaming figures based on certification alone.
