= Pick Up the Pieces (Jason Derulo song) =

Single by Jason Derulo

from the album Future History
- Released: August 9, 2012
- Recorded: May–August 2010
- Length: 3:34
- Label: Beluga Heights; Warner Bros.
- Songwriters: Jason Desrouleaux; Josh Walker; Olivia Waithe; Tiffany Fred; Michael McGregor; Peter King; Lee Monteverde; Kelly Sheehan
- Producers: J.R. Rotem; JD Walker

Jason Derulo singles chronology
| "Undefeated" (2012) | "Pick Up the Pieces" (2012) | "The Other Side" (2013) |

"Pick Up the Pieces" is a song by American singer Jason Derulo for his second studio album, Future History (2011). It was written by Derulo, Josh Walker, Olivia Waithe, Tiffany Fred, Michael McGregor, Peter King, Lee Monteverde and Kelly Sheehan. Production was handled by J.R. Rotem and JD Walker.

The song was released as one of four promotional singles for the album on September 9, 2011. It was later released as the album's sixth and final single in Australia on August 9, 2012, coinciding with the release of the platinum edition of Future History and Derulo's stint as a judge on the TV series Everybody Dance Now.

== Charts ==
| Chart (2012) | Peak position |
|---|---|
| Australia (ARIA) | 37 |
| Australian Urban Singles Chart (ARIA) | 9 |

== Release history ==
| Territory | Date | Format | Label |
|---|---|---|---|
| Austria | September 9, 2011 | Digital download | Beluga Heights; Warner Bros. |
| Germany | September 9, 2011 | Digital download | Beluga Heights; Warner Bros. |
| Switzerland | September 9, 2011 | Digital download | Beluga Heights; Warner Bros. |
| Australia | August 9, 2012 | Contemporary hit radio | Warner Bros. |
