= Westfield Parramatta =

Shopping centre in Sydney, Australia

Westfield Parramattа
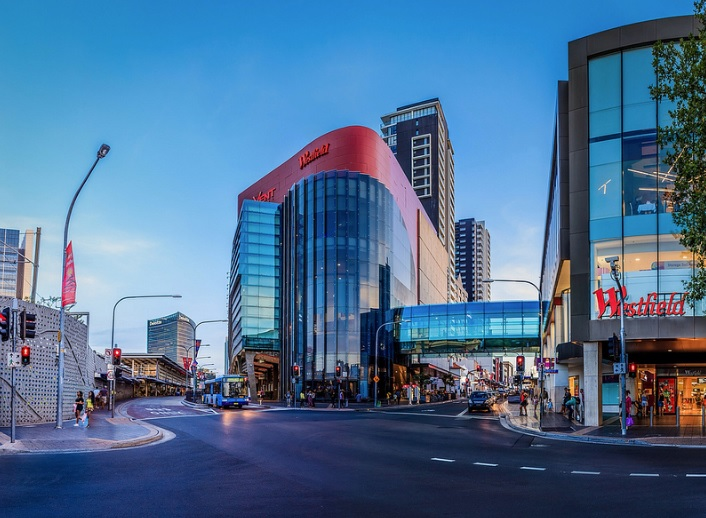
- Westfield Parramatta in 2024, facing southeast towards Church Street (right) and the train/bus interchange (left).
- Location: Parramatta, New South Wales, Australia
- Coordinates: 33°49′03″S 151°00′01″E
- Address: 159–175 Church Street
- Opened: September 1975; 51 years ago
- Developer: Westfield Group
- Manager: Scentre Group
- Owner: Scentre Group (50%); GIC (50%)
- Num. of stores: 457
- Num. of anchor tenants: 10
- Floor area: 137,236 m^{2} (1,477,196 sq ft)
- Floors: 6
- Parking: 4,661 spaces
- Public transit: Parramatta railway station
- Website: www.westfield.com.au

Westfield Parramatta is a shopping centre in Parramatta, Sydney, Australia.

== History ==
The site upon which Westfield Parramatta currently stands has had a long history of retail. In 1933, Grace Bros opened their first Sydney suburban department store on a site on the corner of Church and Argyle Streets. This block, bounded by Aird and Marsden Streets, was predominantly occupied by retail properties and expanded the Parramatta town centre south of the Main Western railway line.

In 1971, planning for the Parramatta retail commenced with the aim of incorporating the existing Grace Bros. store into the first stage development of the new Westfield Parramatta. Development was approved by Parramatta City Council for an expanded retail floor area and a tavern. In the same year the redeveloped Grace Bros featured a food hall, supermarket and a hardware on the ground floor. There was parking spaces for over 2,000 cars in the multi-level carpark.

Westfield Parramatta opened in three stages. Stage one opened in May 1975 and featured Target, Coles, Woolworths and 44 speciality stores. Stage two opened in September 1975 and was the largest shopping centre in Australia at the time. Stage two featured Grace Bros, Waltons and 60 speciality stores. Stage three opened towards the end of 1975 and featured the four screen Village Cinemas complex, Westower Tavern and 14 speciality stores.

The first redevelopment of Westfield Parramatta occurred in 1986 when Village Cinemas was refurbished and 300 stores were added. In 1987 Waltons closed and was replaced by Venture.

In 1989, a proposal to build an underground pedestrian underpass to link the centre with the railway station to ease the passage of commuters to the stores was submitted and subsequently approved.

Westfield Parramatta expanded in 1992 with the purchase of properties on the north side of Aird Street between O’Connell and Marsden Streets and the eastern half of the block bounded by Aird, Marsden, Campbell and O’Connell streets. Parts of the original Westfield Shoppingtown on the corner of Argyle and Marsden Streets, and the northern side of Campbell Street were incorporated into the development. During the excavation in the developments of the sites now occupied by the current Westfield Parramatta involved archaeological digs which uncovered artifacts dating back to the earliest days of Colonial settlement, this revealed the foundations of buildings on what would have been the fringes of Parramatta town in the 19th century reflecting Parramatta's history as the second oldest settlement in Australia. In 1993 AMP sold a 50% shareholding.

Westfield Parramatta was redeveloped in 1996 saw the centre regain its position as the largest shopping centre in Australia, with approximately 127,000m² of retail space (from approximately 80,000m²). This expansion included the development of two separate blocks in the Parramatta CBD west of the main centre. A multi-storey retail air bridge over Marsden Street and Aird Street connected the two new sections to the existing centre's levels 3, 4 and 5. Department store David Jones relocated to Westfield Parramatta from its stand alone store on Church Street which was built in 1961 in the north of the Parramatta CBD. David Jones opened in the space previously occupied by Venture in the space next to Grace Bros in the expanded centre. Village Cinemas expanded from a 4 screen complex to an 8 screen complex while a new fresh food market place opened on level 5 outside Coles and a new food court and JB Hi-Fi and opened on level 5 on the upper level previously occupied by Venture.

In 2006, Westfield Parramatta completed a major redevelopment. This redevelopment included a city block east of the existing centre on the corner of Church Street and Argyle Street was developed as a multi-storey cinema and lifestyle complex, connected to the main centre by a pedestrian air bridge at level 4 and an underground retail arcade at level 1. Greater Union (renamed Event Cinemas in 2010) opened an 11 screen complex featuring 3 Gold Class theatres, 1 GMAX theatre and 7 regular movie cinemas replacing the existing Village Cinemas.

At street level beneath the cinemas, and fronting Parramatta's Transport Interchange (redeveloped along with Westfield), is a concourse of restaurants and cafes with direct access to the cinemas via an external escalator.

The underground retail arcade links the centre's level 1 with Parramatta railway station's main concourse as well as the Parramatta Transport Interchange. It provides for an extension of the underground level 1 food court featuring cafes and takeaway food retailers as well as a fresh food market, a mini IGA Express supermarket and second Woolworths Metro supermarket. A feature of the redeveloped food-court are the electronic passenger destination indicator boards for services out of Parramatta railway station. The existing centre saw minor redevelopment of retail areas adjacent to the new pedestrian air bridge as well as an upgraded facade. The expansion added approximately 70 new specialty shops in addition to the cinemas and close to 200 new car spaces. Following the expansion Westfield Parramatta's gross retail floor area reached its current size of 137,407m² and near 500 stores

On 30 April 2007 Singapore's GIC Real Estate acquired a 50% stake in Westfield Parramatta for $717.5 million over a $1.4 billion deal. In July 2014, as part of a restructure of the Westfield Group, it came under the control of the Scentre Group.

From 2010 and onwards Westfield Parramatta has seen the opening of many new stores including Uniqlo which opened on 28 May 2015, Zara which opened on 24 September 2016 and H&M which opened on the space previously occupied by Toys "R" Us on 17 April 2019.

== Future ==
In 2014, Scentre and GIC had developed plans to build a 25-storey office development on the corner of Argyle and Church Street for up to 35,000m² of commercial space. However in August 2018 plans for the 25 storey tower to reach 42 storeys with 112,000m² of commercial space scheduled to cost $425 million. The proposed building will be moved further to the west on Argyle Street about midway between Church and Marsden streets and above Myer to avoid demolition of the existing five-storey retail podium at the corner block where the original plans were approved for. The space occupied by Myer will be reconfigured to accommodate the tower.

The main office lobby and entrance will also be relocated from Church Street to Argyle Street.

A two storey open-air terrace has been proposed on the roof of the podium and would be integrated with the approved additional retail level with cafés and retail outlets have been proposed for the rooftop area.

David Jones will close its store by the end of 2026.

== Tenants ==
Westfield Parramatta has 137,236m² of floor space. The major retailers include Aldi, Best & Less, Club Lime, Coles, Cotton On, David Jones, Event Cinemas, H&M, JB Hi-Fi, Kmart, Myer, Rebel, Target, Timezone, Uniqlo, Woolworths, Woolworths Metro and Zara.

== Transport ==
The North Shore & Western, Leppington & Inner West and Cumberland Line offer frequent services to Westfield Parramatta.

Westfield Parramatta has bus connections to the Sydney CBD, Inner West Northern Sydney and Greater Western Sydney, as well as local surrounding suburbs. It is served by Busways, CDC NSW and Transit Systems. The majority of its bus services are located opposite Parramatta station or on Argyle Street.

Westfield Parramatta also has multi level car parks with 4,661 spaces.

== Incidents and accidents ==
- On 3 July 2003, a man committed suicide by jumping off the third floor of the shopping centre. Half an hour later, the deceased body of a second male was located on the rooftop near the northern end of the building. Authorities believe the deaths were connected, with homicide detectives ruling out the possibility of a murder-suicide.
- On 25 March 2012 a 34 year old man was shot by police after a hijacking incident which led a police chase from Penrith down the M4 and tried to hijack a taxi before stealing a car from the carpark of the Nepean Hospital and being chased by police towards the motorway. He then crashed into a Mitsubishi Lancer before stealing it from a motorist at knifepoint. A police helicopter tracked the man as he sped along the motorway towards Parramatta. He drove into the Westfield carpark but was chased towards the centre's food court area. An officer caught up with the man and the two fought violently before the man produced a weapon and the officer shot him. The man was declared dead a short time later after paramedics were unable to revive him. Sections of the centre were immediately locked down at 4pm as dozens of police converged on the building. The incident happened not far from a JB Hi-Fi and store employees reported hearing what sounded like an argument outside.
- On 7 July 2014 a man was stabbed to death outside a Myer store at 10:30am. A 33 year old man was arrested at the scene after he took off his shirt and waited for police to arrive.
- On 14 May 2019 a woman fell to her death with police called to the centre around 1pm. Many of the areas in the centre were taped off around 3pm.
- On 23 December 2019 balloons filled with trivial freebies such as coffee vouchers, free parking, gift cards and discount cards sparked a wild stampede amongst the 150 Christmas shoppers as part of the 33 hour non-stop trade promotion. 12 people were treated on scene with a further 5 taken to hospital for further treatment.
- On 4 March 2020 a person was threatened with a knife inside Woolworths over toilet paper. The incident occurred at 1:30pm and staff and police had blocked off access to the toilet paper aisle.
- On 14 October 2022, a woman fell to her death by falling off the fourth floor of the shopping centre. Police blocked off the surrounding area, with nearby shops also temporarily closing. Although not stated, it is believed that the woman committed suicide.
- On 26 February 2024, a woman fell to her death by falling off the fifth floor of the shopping centre. Police blocked off the surrounding area, with nearby shops also temporarily closing. Although not stated, it is believed that the woman committed suicide.
- On Boxing Day 2024, a teenager stabbed allegedly at Parramatta Westfield, the injury was non life threatening and the attack was believed to be targeted.
