= DesiHits =

Desi Hits!
- Website type: Entertainment Portal
- Website: www.desihits.in
- Launched: 2006–present

DesiHits is a multi-platform media company that produces and distributes fusion entertainment content aimed at the South Asian diaspora. The Company was founded in 2006 by Anjula Acharia-Bath, Ranj Bath and Arun Sandhu, and is headquartered in New York. Jimmy Iovine of Interscope Records and Israeli venture capitalist Aviv Nevo are strategic investors in the Company, and the Advisory Board includes former President of Epic Records Charlie Walk, Warner Music's Roger Gold, Tony Kanal of No Doubt, Ogilvy & Mather executive Doug Scott, record producer Steve Stoute, and Drew Lipscher, partner at Greycroft Partners. Anita Chatterjee is the Company's Editor-in-Chief. In January 2008, DesiHits raised a $5 million round of venture capital financing from Draper Fisher Jurvetson, DE Shaw and Trident Capital.

== Achievements ==
The Company's award-winning website DesiHits.in has grown to become a leading online destination for Desi-flavored celebrity interviews, music videos and radio podcasts, reeling in upwards of 10 million hits per month, and generating more traffic than long-established MTVIndia.com. In November 2008, DesiHits announced a partnership with Warner Music Group to develop and distribute original short form videos showcasing mainstream artists experiencing Desi culture through cuisine, fashion and Bollywood. The Company inked a similar agreement with Sony BMG in February 2009. Most recently, DesiHits helped facilitate the AR Rahman-Pussycat Dolls Bollywood remix collaboration of "Jai Ho". The Company is credited with creating original content with the likes of AR Rahman, Sonu Niigaam, Amitabh Bachchan, Aishwarya Rai, Bally Sagoo, Jazzy B, Jay Sean, The Pussycat Dolls, 50 Cent, Lady Gaga, Wyclef Jean, T.I., Sean Paul, Sean Kingston, and others.
