= Matoma discography =

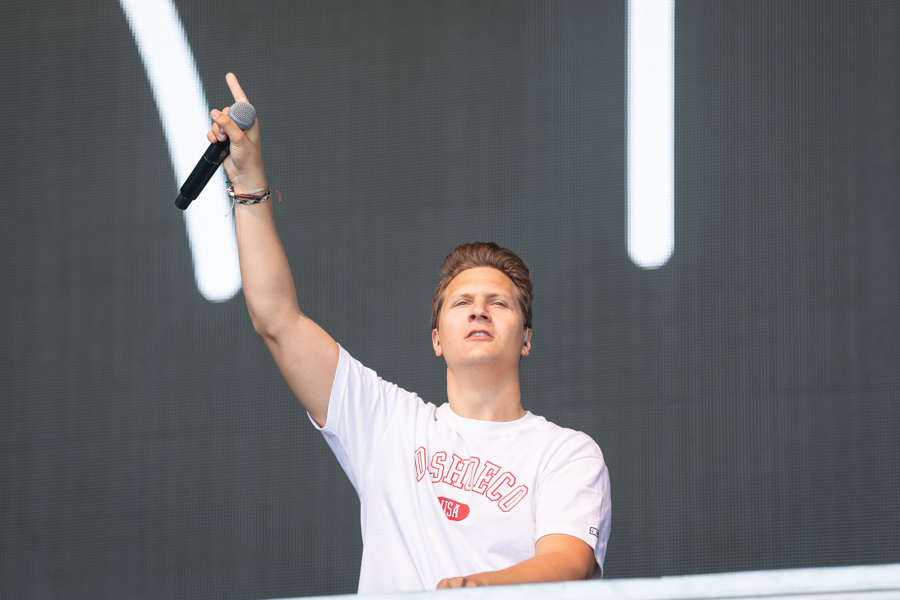
- Matoma at Stavernfestivalen 2019
- Studio albums: 2
- Singles: 21
- Music videos: 5
- Promotional singles: 5
- Remixes: 12

This is the discography of Norwegian DJ and music producer Matoma.

== Albums ==
Title	Album details	Peak positions
Title	Album details	NOR
Hakuna Matoma	Released: 13 November 2015; Label: Warner Music; Format: Digital download, CD	—
One in a Million	Released: 24 August 2018; Label: Warner Music; Format: Digital download, streaming	12
"—" denotes an album that did not chart or was not released.

== Extended plays ==
Title	Album details
Rytme	Released: 8 May 2020; Label: Warner Music; Format: Digital download

== Singles ==
=== As lead artist ===
Title	Year	Peak positions									Certifications	Album
Title	Year	NOR	DEN	FIN	IRE	NLD	NZ	SWE	UK	US Dance	Certifications	Album
"Old Thing Back" (with The Notorious B.I.G. featuring Ja Rule and Ralph Tresvant)	2015	2	18	12	43	75	25	8	—	24	IFPI NOR: Platinum; BPI: Gold; GLF: Platinum; IFPI DEN: Platinum; RIAA: Platinum; RMNZ: 3× Platinum	Hakuna Matoma
"Stick Around" (with Akon)	2015	19	—	—	—	—	—	—	—	—	IFPI NOR: Gold	Hakuna Matoma
"Running Out" (with Astrid S)	2015	7	—	—	—	—	—	57	—	14	IFPI NOR: 2× Platinum; GLF: Platinum; RIAA: Gold	Hakuna Matoma
"Paradise" (with Sean Paul featuring KStewart)	2016	—	—	—	—	—	—	—	—	—		Hakuna Matoma
"Wonderful Life (Mi Oh My)"	2016	26	—	—	—	—	—	—	—	—		Hakuna Matoma
"Take Me Back" (with Christopher)	2016	—	16	—	—	—	—	—	—	—	IFPI DEN: Gold	Hakuna Matoma
"False Alarm" (with Becky Hill)	2016	3	—	—	51	—	—	11	28	16	BPI: Platinum; RIAA: Gold; RMNZ: Gold	Hakuna Matoma and One in a Million
"All Night" (with The Vamps)	2016	13	25	—	6	41	—	13	24	—	IFPI NOR: 2× Platinum; BPI: Platinum; GLF: Gold; IFPI DEN: Platinum; RIAA: Gold; RMNZ: 3× Platinum	Night & Day (Night Edition)
"Heart Won't Forget" (with Gia)	2016	32	—	—	—	—	—	—	—	—		Non-album singles
"Girl at Coachella" (with Magic! featuring D.R.A.M)	2017	38	—	—	—	—	— (Note: "Girl at Coachella" did not enter the NZ Top 40 Singles Chart, but peaked at number 10 on the NZ Heatseeker Singles Chart.)	—	—	—		Non-album singles
"Party on the West Coast" (with Faith Evans and The Notorious B.I.G. featuring Snoop Dogg)	2017	16	—	—	—	—	—	33	—	—		Non-album singles
"Staying Up" (with The Vamps)	2017	37	—	—	—	—	—	— (Note: "Staying Up" did not enter the Sverigetopplistan singles chart, but peaked at number one on the Sverigetopplistan Heatseeker chart.)	80	—		Non-album singles
"Slow" (featuring Noah Cyrus)	2017	30	—	—	—	—	—	87	—	31		One in a Million
"Lonely" (featuring MAX)	2018	—	—	—	—	—	—	— (Note: "Lonely" did not enter the Swedish Singellista Chart, but peaked at number 17 on the Swedish Heatseeker Chart.)	—	43		One in a Million
"I Don't Dance (Without You)" (with Enrique Iglesias featuring Konshens)	2018	—	—	—	—	—	—	—	—	22		One in a Million
"Sunday Morning" (featuring Josie Dunne)	2018	—	—	—	—	—	—	—	—	37		One in a Million
"When You Leave" (with Nikki Vianna)	2019	—	—	—	—	—	—	—	—	—		Non-album singles
"Bruised Not Broken" (featuring MNEK and Kiana Ledé)	2019	—	—	—	—	—	—	—	—	—		Non-album singles
"All Around the World" (featuring Bryn Christopher)	2019	—	—	—	—	—	—	—	—	—		Non-album singles
"Higher" (with Ally Brooke)	2019	—	—	—	—	—	—	—	—	22		Non-album singles
"Keep It Simple" (with Petey featuring Wilder Woods)	2019	—	—	—	—	—	—	—	—	41		Non-album singles
"Peligrosa (Mimosas)" (featuring LateNightJiggy)	2020	—	—	—	—	—	—	—	—	—		Non-album singles
"The Bender" (with Brando)	2020	33	—	—	—	—	—	—	—	—		Rytme
"Let It Go" (featuring Anna Clendening)	2020	—	—	—	—	—	—	—	—	—		Rytme
"Good Vibes" (with Hrvy)	2020	—	—	—	—	—	—	—	—	—		Can Anybody Hear Me?
"Wow" (with Emma Steinbakken)	2020	—	—	—	—	—	—	—	—	—	IFPI NOR: Gold	Non-album singles
"It's Christmas Time" (with Michael Bolton)	2020	—	—	—	—	—	—	—	—	—		Non-album singles
"Never Surrender" (featuring Steve Garrigan)	2021	27	—	—	—	—	—	—	—	—		Non-album singles
"Take Me to the Sunshine" (with Super-Hi featuring Bullysongs)	2022	—	—	—	—	—	—	—	—	—		Non-album singles
"Heart So Big" (with Arizona)	2022	—	—	—	—	—	—	—	—	42		Non-album singles
"Easy to Love" (with Armin van Buuren and Teddy Swims)	2023	—	—	—	—	—	—	—	—	34		Feel Again
"Work It Out" (with Bava)	2023	—	—	—	—	—	—	—	—	—		Non-album singles
"Barn some deg" (with Gabrielle)	2023	3	—	—	—	—	—	—	—	—	IFPI NOR: Platinum	Non-album singles
"Jeg får være som jeg er" (with Beathoven)	2024	20	—	—	—	—	—	—	—	—		Non-album singles
"Samurai Swords" (with Miriam Bryant)	2024	12	—	—	—	—	—	— (Note: "Samurai Swords" did not enter the Swedish Singellista Chart, but peaked at number four on the Swedish Heatseeker Chart.)	—	—	IFPI NOR: Gold	Non-album singles
"You Found Me" (with Skaar)	2024	—	—	—	—	—	—	—	—	—		Non-album singles
"BlimE! – Være med" (with Agnete)	2025	29	—	—	—	—	—	—	—	—		Non-album singles
"—" denotes a single that did not chart or was not released in that territory.

=== As featured artist ===
Title	Year	Peak positions								Certifications	Album
Title	Year	NOR	DEN	FRA	FIN	GER	SPA	SWE	UK	Certifications	Album
"Try Me" (Jason Derulo featuring Jennifer Lopez and Matoma)	2015	4	13	168	50	39	57	35	113	IFPI NOR: 2× Platinum; BVMI: Gold; GLF: Platinum; IFPI DEN: Platinum; RMNZ: Gold	Everything Is 4 and Hakuna Matoma

=== Promotional singles ===
Title	Year	Certifications	Album
"Feeling Right (Everything Is Nice)" (featuring Wale and Popcaan)	2015	IFPI NOR: Gold	Hakuna Matoma
"Find Love" (featuring Dboy)	2015		Hakuna Matoma
"Knives" (with Frenship)	2015		Hakuna Matoma
"Love You Right" (with Nico & Vinz)	2015		Hakuna Matoma
"The Wave" (featuring Madcon)	2015		Hakuna Matoma

== Remixes ==
Title	Original artist	Year	Peak chart positions	Album
Title	Original artist	Year	NOR	Album
"I Don't Want to Talk About It" (Matoma & Nelsaan Remix)	Marit Larsen	2014	—	Non-album singles
"Deep End" (Matoma Remix)	Coucheron (featuring Estside and Mayer Hawthorne)	2014	—	Non-album singles
"This Is My Year" (Matoma Remix)	Family Force 5	2015	—	Time Stands Still (re-release)
"2AM" (Matoma Remix)	Astrid S	2015	13	Hakuna Matoma
"Happy Home" (Matoma Remix)	Hedegaard (featuring Lukas Graham)	2015	—	Non-album singles
"Don't Worry" (Matoma Remix)	Madcon	2015	—	Non-album singles
"Perfect" (Matoma Remix)	One Direction	2015	—	Hakuna Matoma
"Adventure of a Lifetime" (Matoma Remix)	Coldplay	2015		Hakuna Matoma
"Hotter than Hell" (Matoma Remix)	Dua Lipa	2016	—	Hakuna Matoma
"Take Me Back" (Matoma Remix)	Christopher	2017	—	Closer (re-release)
"I Miss You" (Matoma Remix)	Clean Bandit (featuring Julia Michaels)	2017	—	Non-album singles
"Pretender" (Matoma Remix)	Steve Aoki (featuring Lil Yachty and AJR)	2018	—	Non-album singles
"Nevermind" (Matoma Remix)	Hrvy	2020	—	Non-album singles
"Married In Vegas" (Matoma Remix)	The Vamps	2020	—	Non-album singles
"—" denotes a recording that did not chart or was not released in that territory.
