= Astrid S discography =

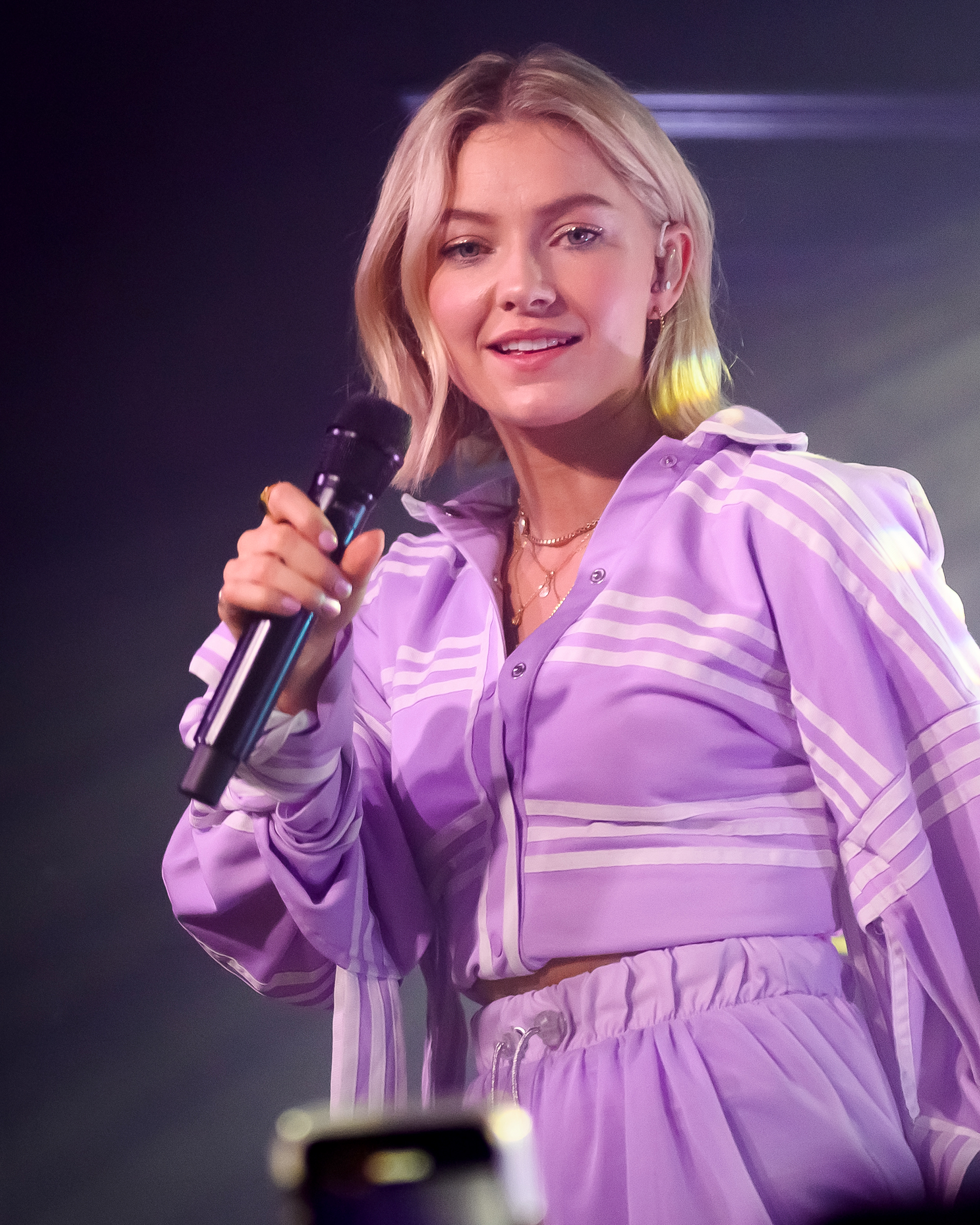
- Astrid S performing in March 2019
- Studio albums: 2
- EPs: 7
- Singles: 47
- Guest appearances: 3

Norwegian singer-songwriter Astrid S has released two studio album, seven EPs (extended plays), 45 singles (including seven as featured artist) and made 3 guest appearances.
Astrid made her debut in 2013 when she released first single "Shattered". In 2014, she released her next single "2AM".

In 2016, Astrid released her self-titled debut extended play which was supported by two singles "Paper Thin" and "Hurts So Good". The latter became a viral sleeper hit in 2021, and remains her most streamed song on Spotify with over 500 million streams. The song was later re-released on the same year on the complete edition of her debut studio album Leave It Beautiful.

In June 2017, her second extended play Party's Over was released. The project was preceded by the release of four singles "Breathe", "Bloodstream", "Such a Boy" and titular "Party's Over". "Think Before I Talk" was released in August 2017 as a stand-alone single, however it was later included on the complete edition of her debut studio album Leave It Beautiful.

Her fourth EP Trust Issues was released in August 2019. The project was supported by three tracks "Emotion" which was later included on the complete edition of her debut album, "Someone New" and "The First One". Down Low singer's fifth EP was released in September 2019 which is a month after the previous one. "Favorite Part of Me" was the sole track preceding the EP release.

Astrid's debut studio album Leave It Beautiful was released in 2020 on October 16. The album was supported by tracks like "Dance Dance Dance", "It's OK If You Forget Me" and "Marilyn Monroe". Felt Cute Might Delete Later is singer's sixth EP which was released in April 2023.

"Two Hands", "First to Go", "Oh Emma" and "Hot Fever Dream" were released from January to May 2024. All of them are a part of her studio album Joyride which was released on 24 May 2024.

== Studio albums ==
Title	Details	Peak chart positions
Title	Details	NOR
Leave It Beautiful	Released: 16 October 2020; Label: Universal; Format: Vinyl, CD, digital download, streaming	2
Joyride	Released: 24 May 2024; Label: Island, Universal; Format: CD, vinyl, digital download, streaming	10

== Extended plays ==
List of extended plays, with selected details, chart positions
Title	Details	Peak chart positions				Certifications
Title	Details	NOR	DEN	NZ Heat	SWE	Certifications
Astrid S	Released: 20 May 2016; Label: Island; Format: Digital download	—	38	—	40	RMNZ: Gold
Party's Over	Released: 30 June 2017; Label: Island; Format: Digital download	—	—	5	22	
Party's Over (Acoustic)	Released: 14 July 2017; Label: Universal; Format: Digital download	—	—	—	—	
Trust Issues	Released: 30 August 2019; Label: Universal; Formats: Digital download, streaming	—	—	—	55	
Down Low	Released: 26 September 2019; Label: Universal; Formats: Digital download, streaming	—	—	—	—	
Felt Cute Might Delete Later	Released: 21 April 2023; Label: Universal; Formats: Digital download, streaming	—	—	—	—	
Hver Gang Vi Møtes 2025	Released: 17 February 2025; Label: Joyride, Gladstone; Formats: Digital download, streaming	2	—	—	—	IFPI NOR: Platinum
"—" denotes an EP that did not chart or was not released.

== Singles ==
=== As lead artist ===
Title	Year	Peak chart positions									Certifications	Album
Title	Year	NOR	AUS	BEL (FL) Tip	BEL (WA) Tip	DEN	NZ	SWE	UK	US Dance	Certifications	Album
"Shattered"	2013	4	—	—	—	—	—	—	—	—	IFPI NOR: Gold	Non-album singles
"2AM" (original or Matoma remix)	2014	13	—	—	—	—	—	—	—	—	IFPI NOR: 3× Platinum; GLF: Gold	Non-album singles
"Hyde"	2015	8	—	—	—	—	—	—	—	—		Non-album singles
"Paper Thin"	2015	19	—	—	—	—	—	— (Note: "Paper Thin" did not enter the Swedish Singles Chart, but peaked at number nine on the Swedish Heatseeker chart.)	—	—	IFPI NOR: Gold; GLF: Gold; IFPI DEN: Gold	Astrid S
"Running Out" (with Matoma)	2015	7	—	—	—	—	—	57	—	—	IFPI NOR: 2× Platinum; GLF: Platinum; RIAA: Gold	Hakuna Matoma
"Hurts So Good"	2016	6	—	41	40	—	18	41	176	—	IFPI NOR: 3× Platinum; BPI: Silver; GLF: 2× Platinum; IFPI DEN: Platinum; RIAA: Gold; RMNZ: 2× Platinum	Astrid S & Leave It Beautiful (Complete)
"Breathe"	2017	3	97	—	—	—	—^{[A]}	41	—	39	GLF: Platinum	Party's Over
"Bloodstream"	2017	—	—	—	—	—	—	—	—	—		Party's Over
"Party's Over"	2017	—	—	—	—	—	—	—	—	—		Party's Over
"Such a Boy"	2017	2	—	—	—	—	—^{[B]}	—	—	—		Party's Over
"Think Before I Talk"	2017	1	—	14	—	9	—	20	—	10	IFPI NOR: 5× Platinum; GLF: Platinum; IFPI DEN: 2× Platinum	Leave It Beautiful (Complete)
"Boys" (with Lars Vaular)	2017	39	—	—	—	—	—	—	—	—		Non-album single
"Emotion"	2018	3	—	—	—	—	—	— (Note: "Emotion" did not enter the Swedish Singellista Chart, but peaked at number one on the Swedish Heatseeker Chart.)	—	27		Trust Issues & Leave It Beautiful (Complete)
"Closer"	2018	—	—	—	—	—	—	—	—	—		Non-album single
"Someone New"	2019	9	—	—	—	—	— (Note: "Someone New" did not enter the NZ Top 40 Singles Chart, but peaked at number 26 on the NZ Hot Singles Chart.)	— (Note: "Someone New" did not enter the Swedish Singellista Chart, but peaked at number four on the Swedish Heatseeker Chart.)	—	—		Trust Issues
"Only When It Rains" (with Frank Walker)	2019	31	—	—	—	—	—	—	—	—		Non-album single
"Sing It with Me" (with JP Cooper)	2019	22	—	3	19	—	— (Note: "Sing It with Me" did not enter the NZ Top 40 Singles Chart, but peaked at number 40 on the NZ Hot Singles Chart.)	76	—	—	BPI: Silver	Love & She
"The First One"	2019	5	—	—	—	—	—	— (Note: "The First One" did not enter the Swedish Singellista Chart, but peaked at number 11 on the Swedish Heatseeker Chart.)	—	—		Trust Issues
"Favorite Part of Me"	2019	9	—	—	—	—	—	—	—	—		Down Low
"I Do" (with Brett Young)	2020	3	—	—	—	—	—	—	—	—		Leave It Beautiful (Complete)
"I Don't Know Why" (with NOTD)	2020	16	—	—	—	—	—	91	—	—		Leave It Beautiful (Complete)
"Dance Dance Dance"	2020	6	—	—	—	—	— (Note: "Dance Dance Dance" did not enter the NZ Top 40 Singles Chart, but peaked at number 31 on the NZ Hot Singles Chart.)	—	—	—		Leave It Beautiful
"Marilyn Monroe"	2020	7	—	—	—	—	—	—	—	—		Leave It Beautiful
"It's OK If You Forget Me"	2020	7	—	—	—	—	—	—	—	—		Leave It Beautiful
"Am I the Only One" (with R3hab and Hrvy)	2020	—	—	—	—	—	—	—	—	—		Non-album singles
"Relations" (with Felix Sandman)	2020	7	—	—	—	—	—	— (Note: "Relations" did not enter the Swedish Singellista Chart, but peaked at number two on the Swedish Heatseeker Chart.)	—	—	IFPI NOR: Platinum	Non-album singles
"Når snøen smelter"	2021	1	—	—	—	—	—	—	—	—	IFPI NOR: 4× Platinum	Tre nøtter til Askepott (soundtrack)
"Pretty" (with Dagny)	2021	10	—	—	—	—	—	—	—	—		The Hating Game (soundtrack)
"Come First"	2022	7	—	—	—	—	—	—	—	—		Non-album single
"Side Effects"	2023	—	—	—	—	—	—	—	—	—		Felt Cute Might Delete Later
"Fuck Off"	2023	8	—	—	—	—	—	—	—	—		Felt Cute Might Delete Later
"Expiration Date" (Note: The song is stylised as "Expiration Date_demo_V2.wav")	2023	—	—	—	—	—	—	—	—	—		Felt Cute Might Delete Later
"Darkest Hour"	2023	—	—	—	—	—	—	—	—	—		Felt Cute Might Delete Later
"That Guy"	2023	30	—	—	—	—	—	—	—	—		Non-album single
"Two Hands"	2024	33	—	—	—	—	—	—	—	—		Joyride
"First to Go"	2024	—	—	—	—	—	—	—	—	—		Joyride
"Oh Emma"	2024	—	—	—	—	—	—	—	—	—		Joyride
"Hot Fever Dream"	2024	—	—	—	—	—	—	—	—	—		Joyride
"Det regner i Oslo"	2024	1	—	—	—	—	—	—	—	—		Hver Gang Vi Møtes 2025
"Symfoni"	2025	6	—	—	—	—	—	—	—	—		Hver Gang Vi Møtes 2025
"A Lovestory" (with Fay Wildhagen)	2025	12	—	—	—	—	—	—	—	—		Hver Gang Vi Møtes 2025
"Romantisk"	2025	23	—	—	—	—	—	—	—	—		Hver Gang Vi Møtes 2025
"Få det på" (with Stig Brenner)	2025	1	—	—	—	—	—	—	—	—		Hver Gang Vi Møtes 2025
"Nanana"	2025	8	—	—	—	—	—	—	—	—		Hver Gang Vi Møtes 2025
"Matters" (with Thomas Dybdahl)	2025	39	—	—	—	—	—	—	—	—		Hver Gang Vi Møtes 2025
"Friskis" (with Kjartan Lauritzen)	2025	5	—	—	—	—	—	—	—	—	IFPI NOR: 2× Platinum	Non-album single
"Konfetti" (with Molly Sandén)	2025	18	—	—	—	—	—	15	—	—		Strawberry Blonde
"Ja, vi elsker"	2026	42	—	—	—	—	—	—	—	—		Non-album single
"—" denotes a single that did not chart or was not released.

=== As featured artist ===
Title	Year	Peak chart positions	Certifications	Album
Title	Year	NOR	Certifications	Album
"Waiting for Love" (Avicii featuring Prinston and Astrid S, acoustic)	2015	—		Waiting for Love (Remixes)
"Dust" (CLMD featuring Astrid S)	2016	13	IFPI NOR: Platinum	Non-album single
"All Night" (The Vamps and Matoma featuring Astrid S)	2017	—		Night & Day
"Just for One Night" (Blonde featuring Astrid S)	2017	—		Non-album single
"Breathe" (Röyksopp featuring Astrid S)	2022	—		Profound Mysteries
"Let's Get It Right" (Röyksopp featuring Astrid S)	2022	—		Profound Mysteries II
"Just Wanted to Know" (Röyksopp featuring Astrid S)	2022	—		Profound Mysteries III
"—" denotes a single that did not chart or was not released.

== Guest appearances ==
Title	Year	Peak chart positions	Certifications	Album
Title	Year	NOR	Certifications	Album
"Air" (Shawn Mendes featuring Astrid S)	2015	40	IFPI NOR: Platinum	Handwritten
"Dawn" (iSHi featuring Astrid S)	2015	—		Spring Pieces
"Closing Doors" (Harry Hudson featuring Astrid S)	2020	—		Hey, I'm Here For You

== Other charted songs ==
Title	Year	Peak chart positions		Album
Title	Year	NOR	SWE Heat.	Album
"Doing to Me"	2019	15	11	Trust Issues
"Trust Issues"	2019	32	—	Trust Issues
"Years"	2020	15	—	Down Low
"Airpods"	2020	22	—	Leave It Beautiful
"—" denotes a song that did not chart or was not released.

== Covers ==
- "Undressed" – cover with Julie Bergan (2013) – Certified Platinum by IFPI NOR
- "FourFiveSeconds" – cover (2015)
- "Vi er perfekt men verden er ikke det" – cover (2017)

== Notes ==
- A "Breathe" did not chart on the NZ Top 40 Singles Chart, but peaked at 5 on the NZ Heatseekers Singles chart.
- B "Such a Boy" did not chart on the NZ Top 40 Singles Chart, but peaked at 9 on the NZ Heatseekers Singles chart.
