= Skaar (singer) =

Norwegian singer and songwriter

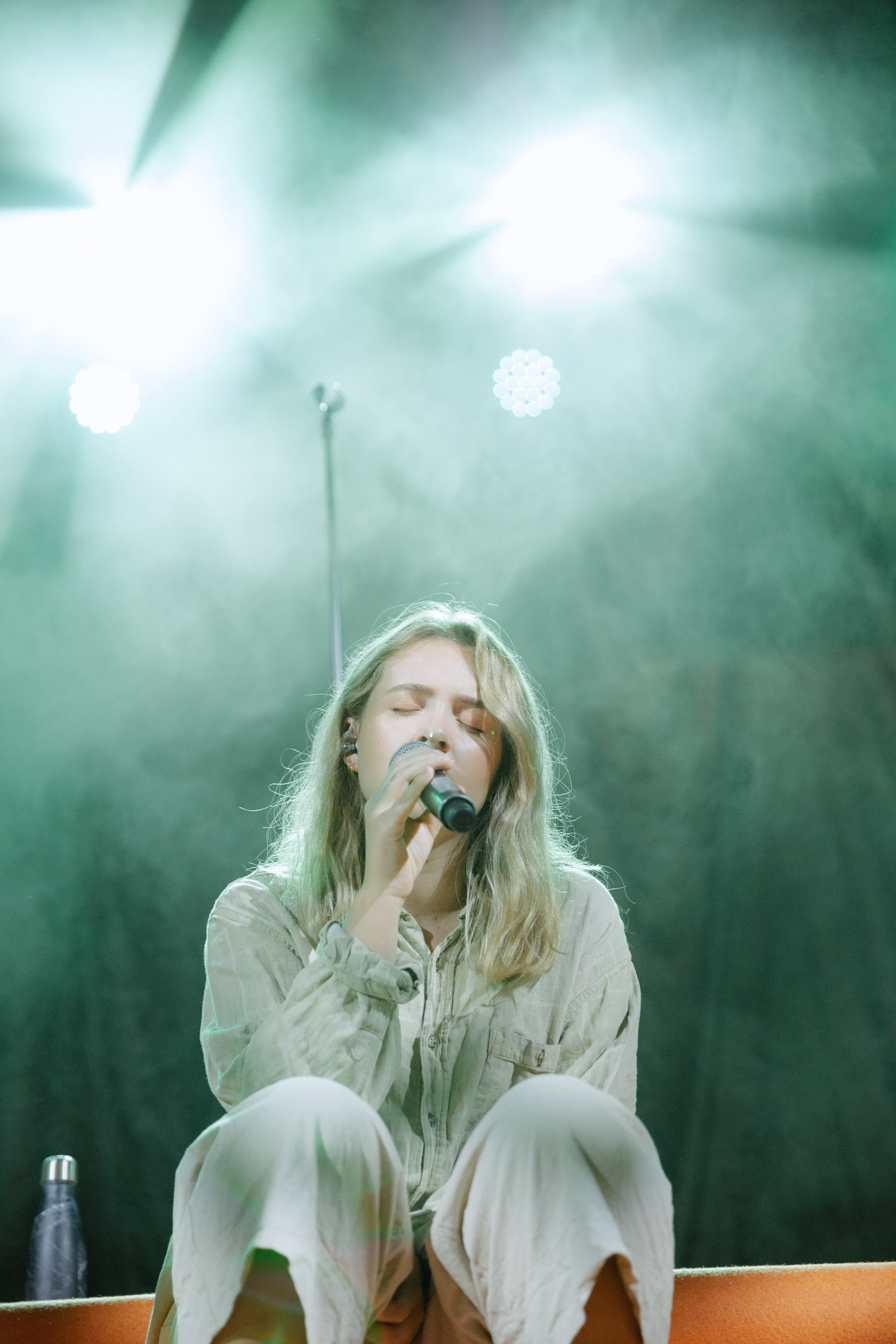
- Skaar in 2020

Background information
- Born: August 8, 1998 (age 28); Stord, Norway
- Genres: synth-pop; electropop; alternative pop; indie pop
- Occupations: artist; producer; singer; songwriter
- Instruments: Vocals; Piano; Guitar
- Years active: 2016–present
- Label: Warner Norway
- Website: www.skaarmusic.no

Hilde Skaar (born August 8, 1998, in Stord), also known as Skaar (stylised in all caps), is a Norwegian singer and songwriter.

== Life and career ==
Skaar comes from Stord Municipality in western Norway. At the age of 18, she was involved as a singer in the song "Wherever You Go" by TRXD. In September 2018, Skaar released her debut single "Higher Ground", with which she achieved six million streams on Spotify in less than a year. The song was also used for the Norwegian film Battle. This was followed by her second single "Wicked Rhythm". In 2019, she sang during the Norwegian royal family's state visit to Chile.

She was nominated in the "Newcomer" category at the P3 Gull music award in 2019. She was also nominated in the newcomer category at the Spellemannprisen 2020. She also received a nomination in the pop category for her 2020 debut EP "The Other Side of Waiting". Skaar contributed music to the series Home For Christmas. In 2021, she was nominated for "The Bendiksen" prize and released the album "Waiting". In March 2023, "Mad Woman, Pt. 1", the first part of the album Mad Woman, followed. In 2023, she was the opening act for singer Tori Amos' "Ocean To Ocean Tour". At the Spellemannprisen 2023, she won in the "Songwriter" category.

== Influences ==
In an interview for Norwegian Arts, Skaar revealed that fellow Norwegian singer-songwriter Astrid S is her 'idol who she look up to'. She also revealed for "1883" magazine that she's a big fan of British rock band Coldplay.

== Discography ==
=== Albums ===
Title	Details	Peak chart positions
Title	Details	NOR
Mad Woman	Released: 29 September 2023; Label: Warner Norway; Format: LP, digital download, streaming	20

=== EPs ===
Title	Details	Peak chart positions
Title	Details	NOR
The Other Side of Waiting	Released: 4 September 2020; Label: Warner Norway; Format: digital download, streaming	39
Waiting	Released: 16 April 2021; Label: Warner Norway; Format: digital download, streaming	—
Mad Women	Released: 19 July 2024; Label: Warner Norway; Format: digital download, streaming	—

=== Singles ===
Title	Year	Peak chart positions		Certifications	Album
Title	Year	NOR	NOR Air.	Certifications	Album
"Wherever You Go" (with TRXD)	2016	34	—		Non-album single
"Higher Ground"	2018	94	—	IFPI NOR: Gold	The Other Side of Waiting
"Wicked Rhythm"	2019	—	—		The Other Side of Waiting
"24"	2019	—	—		The Other Side of Waiting
"Five Times"	2019	—	—		The Other Side of Waiting
"It's Christmas After All"	2019	—	—		Home For Christmas
"Quiet"	2020	—	—		The Other Side of Waiting
"The Scientist"	2020	—	—		Non-album single
"Voodoo Voodoo" (with Iris)	2020	—	—		Love and Other Disasters
"Say Something Now"	2021	—	—		Waiting
"Time" (featuring Iris)	2021	—	—		Waiting
"Black Hole"	2021	—	—		Non-album singles
"Both Sides Now"	2021	—	—		Non-album singles
"Promise" (with Fay Wildhagen)	2021	—	—		Non-album singles
"Out Of My Hands"	2022	—	—		Mad Woman
"Something Like This"	2022	—	—		Mad Woman
"Get Him Away From Me"	2022	—	—		Mad Woman
"Imposter Syndrome"	2023	—	—		Mad Woman
"Follow Your Heart"	2023	—	—		Mad Woman
"Se ilden lyse"	2023	64	—		Non-album singles
"Når himmelen faller ned" (with Fay Wildhagen)	2023	56	—		Non-album singles
"Mad Woman" (with Emilie Nicolas)	2024	—	—		Mad Women
"You Found Me" (with Matoma)	2024	—	—		Non-album single
"Omen" (with Slowshift)	2024	—	—		NR24
"Missing Out"	2025	—	—		TBA
"Medicine"	2025	—	—		TBA
"I Could Miss You Forever"	2025	7	1		TBA
"—" denotes singles that did not chart or were not released.
