= Running Out =

Running Out may refer to:

- "Running Out" (Matoma and Astrid S song)
- "Running Out", by Juliana Hatfield, from the album Bed
- "Running Out" (Scissor Sisters song), from the album Night Work
