= Get Ugly =

Single by Jason Derulo

from the album Everything Is 4
- B-side: "Try Me"
- Released: December 15, 2015
- Genre: Pop rap
- Length: 3:20
- Label: Warner Bros.
- Songwriters: Jason Desrouleaux; Jason Evigan; Eric Frederic; Sean Douglas
- Producers: Ricky Reed; Jarami

Jason Derulo singles chronology
"Drive You Crazy" (2015)	"Get Ugly" (2015)	"Secret Love Song" (2016)

"Get Ugly" is a song by American singer Jason Derulo for his fourth studio album Everything Is 4 (2015). It was released as the album's fourth single (third in US markets) on December 15, 2015. Derulo co-wrote the song with Jason Evigan, Sean Douglas, and Ricky Reed; the latter is also the producer. The track samples "We Got Our Own Thang" by Heavy D & the Boyz from their second studio album Big Tyme.

== Critical reception ==
Pitchfork criticized "Get Ugly", calling it: "a brutal attempt to reprise the ubiquitous "Wiggle," though the result is more like "Sexyback" re-imagined under the influence of a half dozen Jaeger bombs."

== Music video ==
The music video for the track, directed by Syndrome, premiered via Derulo's YouTube channel on December 14, 2015. Allison Bowsher of Much TV channel called it a "good old fashioned dance video" and wrote that it "showcase his talent as a dancer". Colin Joyce from Spin wrote that the video "plays like a re-imagining of Lionel Richie's "All Night Long" video". Radio.com's Amanda Wicks said that Derulo "shows off some fresh moves by way of slick choreography" throughout the video.

== Track listing ==
- CD single
1. "Get Ugly"
2. "Try Me" (featuring Jennifer Lopez and Matoma)

== Charts and certifications ==
=== Weekly charts ===
Chart (2015–2016)	Peak position
Australia (ARIA)	77
Belgium (Ultratip Bubbling Under Flanders)	10
Belgium (Ultratop 50 Wallonia)	47
Canada Hot 100 (Billboard)	65
Czech Republic Singles Digital (ČNS IFPI)	66
France (SNEP)	188
Germany (GfK)	38
Hungary (Dance Top 40)	36
Ireland (IRMA)	28
Lebanon (OLT20)	14
Mexico Airplay (Billboard)	24
New Zealand Heatseekers (RMNZ)	3
Poland Airplay (ZPAV)	62
Romania (Media Forest)	5
Russia Airplay (Tophit)	26
Slovakia Singles Digital (ČNS IFPI)	76
UK Singles (Official Charts)	12
US Billboard Hot 100	52
US Dance Airplay (Billboard)	21
US Pop Airplay (Billboard)	19
US Rhythmic Airplay (Billboard)	17

=== Year-end charts ===
Chart (2016)	Position
UK Singles (OCC)	83

== Certifications ==
Region	Certification	Certified units/sales
Australia (ARIA)	Platinum	70,000^{‡}
Germany (BVMI)	Gold	200,000^{‡}
New Zealand (RMNZ)	Gold	7,500^{*}
Poland (ZPAV)	Gold	10,000^{‡}
United Kingdom (BPI)	Platinum	600,000^{‡}
United States (RIAA)	Gold	500,000^{‡}
^{*} Sales figures based on certification alone.^{‡} Sales+streaming figures based on certification alone.

== Release history ==
Region	Date	Format(s)	Label	Ref.
United States	December 15, 2015	Contemporary hit radio	Warner Bros.	
Italy	January 15, 2016	Contemporary hit radio	Warner	
Germany	April 22, 2016	CD single	Warner	
