= Hurt So Good =

Hurt So Good may refer to:

- "It Hurts So Good", a song written by Phillip Mitchell, first recorded in 1971 and covered by Millie Jackson, Susan Cadogan and Jimmy Somerville
- "Hurts So Good", a song by American singer-songwriter John Mellencamp, then performing under the stage name "John Cougar"
- "Hurt So Good" (Carly Rae Jepsen song)
- "Hurts So Good" (Astrid S song)
