= Not Coming Home =

Not Coming Home may refer to:

- "Not Coming Home", a 2002 song by Maroon 5 from Songs About Jane
- "Not Coming Home", a 2018 song by Matoma from One in a Million
