= Try Me (Jason Derulo song) =

Single by Jason Derulo featuring Jennifer Lopez and Matoma

from the album Everything Is 4
- Released: May 26, 2015
- Genre: Tropical house; pop
- Length: 3:20
- Label: Warner Bros.
- Songwriters: Jason Desrouleaux; Lindy Robbins; Shy Carter; Marvin Gaye; Odell Brown; David Ritz
- Producers: Frank Harris; Derulo; Matoma

Jason Derulo singles chronology
"Want to Want Me" (2015)	"Try Me" (2015)	"Cheyenne" (2015)

Jennifer Lopez singles chronology
"El Mismo Sol" (2015)	"Try Me" (2015)	"Ain't Your Mama" (2016)

Matoma singles chronology
"Old Thing Back" (2015)	"Try Me" (2015)	"Stick Around" (2015)

Audio video
- "Try Me" on YouTube

"Try Me" is a song by American singer Jason Derulo, featuring fellow American singer Jennifer Lopez and Norwegian DJ Matoma, who also produced the song. It was released as the third single exclusively in Europe from his fourth studio album, Everything Is 4 (2015). The single was released on May 26, 2015. "Try Me" is also included on Matoma's debut studio album, Hakuna Matoma.

== Background ==
Derulo told Capital FM that he was in the studio working on some material for Lopez’s next album, when Lopez suggested they work on something for his album, as it was coming out sooner.

== Composition ==
The song is a pop ballad which contains "breezy", tropical house, and Balearic beats. According to Newsday's Glenn Gomboa, the song is a "mix of an old-school pop duet and of-the-moment, Latin-tinged production". Dan Weiss of Spin described it as "the Afro-futurist 'Sexual Healing'". Jeff Benjamin of Fuse found the melody was reminiscent of Nick Jonas's "Jealous". Thematically, Derulo said the song is "about the prospect of meeting somebody new. You might be the person I’ve been looking for. Try me."

== Critical reception ==
Sam C. Mac of Slant Magazine's deemed it "an ebullient pop ballad that bests Talk Dirty standout 'Trumpets' ". Vibe's Marjua Estevez wrote the song "could potentially be summer's bae anthem" and called it "a perfect tune for drop-top weather", while also commending the harmony of both singers. Jeff Benjamin of Fuse wrote: "Vocally, the best moments in the track come when the singers' high and low notes are layered, serving the listener some wonderfully sensual harmonies."

== Music video ==
The song's accompanying music video was planned to be released, however, Derulo has confirmed that was made: "It's in the concept; the guys have to be really strong. You will understand when you actually see [the video]. It's a competition of some sort."

== Track listing ==
- CD single
1. "Get Ugly"
2. "Try Me" (featuring Jennifer Lopez and Matoma)

== Charts ==
Chart (2015–16)	Peak position
Austria (Ö3 Austria Top 40)	22
Belgium (Ultratip Bubbling Under Wallonia)	22
Denmark (Tracklisten)	13
Finland (Suomen virallinen lista)	50
France (SNEP)	168
Germany (GfK)	39
Netherlands (Dutch Top 40 Tipparade)	7
Norway (VG-lista)	4
Poland Airplay (ZPAV)	5
Slovenia (SloTop50)	17
Spain (Promusicae)	57
Sweden (Sverigetopplistan)	35
UK Singles (Official Charts)	113

== Certifications ==
Region	Certification	Certified units/sales
Denmark (IFPI Danmark)	Platinum	60,000^{^}
Germany (BVMI)	Gold	200,000^{‡}
New Zealand (RMNZ)	Gold	7,500^{*}
Norway (IFPI Norway)	2× Platinum	80,000^{‡}
Sweden (GLF)	Platinum	40,000^{‡}
^{*} Sales figures based on certification alone.^{^} Shipments figures based on certification alone.^{‡} Sales+streaming figures based on certification alone.
