= Lonely (Matoma song) =

Single by Matoma featuring Max

from the album One in a Million
- Released: 23 March 2018
- Genre: EDM-pop
- Length: 2:47
- Label: Parlophone; Warner Music Group
- Songwriter(s): Thomas Lagergren; Richard Boardman; Pablo Bowman; Sarah Blanchard; Daniel Boyle; Cleo Tighe; Eden Anderson; Naomi Miller; Nicholas Gale; Maxwell Schneider
- Producer(s): Matoma; The Six; Digital Farm Animals

Matoma singles chronology
"Slow" (2018)	"Lonely" (2018)	"I Don't Dance (Without You)" (2018)

MAX singles chronology
"Survive" (2017)	"Lonely" (2018)	"Sax on the Beach" (2018)

"Lonely" is a song by Norwegian DJ Matoma featuring American singer Max, released on 23 March 2018 as the second single from Matoma's second album One in a Million. It was produced by Matoma in collaboration with the UK songwriting collective The Six, and the English DJ Digital Farm Animals. The track reached the top 50 of the US Dance/Electronic Songs chart and the Swedish Heatseeker chart published by Sverigetopplistan.

== Composition ==
Matoma wrote "Lonely" about "fake people that aren't there for you and bring you down with their negative energy".

== Music ==
"Lonely" is an uptempo EDM-pop song with a tropical-influenced drop. It begins with Max's "sultry" vocals along with minimal percussion and gradually builds on its bass and synthesizer instrumentation.

== Critical reception ==
Billboard called the song a "bouncy tropical jam", with edm.com also noting its "upbeat, tropical sounding instrumental drop complete with synths and a catchy melody". Aficia considered it "bright and seductive" and acclaimed Max for his "warm vocal harmonies and flights", as well as the song's "melodic and catchy rhythm" and hook.

== Music video ==
The music video was released in April 2018 and features a group of dancers in a club setting. Max is shown singing the song while looking into a mirror in the club's bathroom.

== Track listing ==
Digital download and stream
No.	Title	Length
1.	"Lonely" (featuring Max)	2:47

Remixes EP
No.	Title	Length
1.	"Lonely" (featuring Max) (Steve Aoki remix)	2:55
2.	"Lonely" (featuring Max) (Alle Farben remix)	2:40
3.	"Lonely" (featuring Max) (Jack Wins remix)	3:07
4.	"Lonely" (featuring Max) (Party Pupils remix)	2:57

== Charts ==
Chart (2018)	Peak position
Sweden Heatseeker (Sverigetopplistan)	17
US Hot Dance/Electronic Songs (Billboard)	43
