= Breathe (Astrid S song) =

Single by Astrid S

from the EP Party's Over
- Released: 10 March 2017
- Genre: Electropop
- Length: 3:28
- Label: Island
- Songwriter(s): Astrid Smeplass; Rickard Göransson; Oscar Holter; Asia Whitacre
- Producer(s): Holter

Astrid S singles chronology
"Hurts So Good" (2016)	"Breathe" (2017)	"Bloodstream" (2017)

Music video
- "Breathe" on YouTube

"Breathe" is a song by Norwegian singer Astrid S, released as the first single from her second EP, Party's Over. The song was written by Astrid S herself along Rickard Göransson, Asia Whitacre and Oscar Holter, this later also serving as the song's producer.

== Composition ==
The song has been described as a "sliky electro-pop anthem". She wrote it along songwriter Asia Whitacrae in a session with Wolf Cousins' producers Rickard Göransson and Oscar Holter, this later also producing it. In an interview with Idolator, Astrid S said that it was one of the most difficult songs she wrote as she spent two days on it. At first she found the song "too poppy" and wasn't able to picture herself singing the song, but after the track getting a different production, she changed her mind, calling "Breathe", "absolutely lusher than anything else I've done".

== Music video ==
The music video, directed by Cherry Cobra Films and inspired by classic action films, including James Bond's work as well as Kill Bill and Mr. & Mrs. Smith was premiered via Vevo on 21 March 2017. She commented about the video's recording in an interview with Noisey: "People do it so well in movies, and I really felt the pressure. My heart was beating so fast, and I was practicing like crazy right before they said 'Action.' It was really nerve-wracking, because I wanted it to look really badass—but hopefully it does."

== Charts ==
Chart (2017)	Peak position
Australia (ARIA)	97
Czech Republic (Rádio – Top 100)	25
New Zealand Heatseekers (RMNZ)	5
Norway (VG-lista)	3
Sweden (Sverigetopplistan)	41
US Dance Club Songs (Billboard)	39

== Certifications ==
Region	Certification	Certified units/sales
Sweden (GLF)	Platinum	40,000^{‡}
^{‡} Sales+streaming figures based on certification alone.
