= Slow (Matoma song) =

Single by Matoma featuring Noah Cyrus

from the album One in a Million
- Released: 17 November 2017
- Genre: Future Bass
- Length: 3:20
- Label: Parlophone; Warner Music Group
- Songwriters: Thomas Stræte Lagergren; Jayson DeZuzio; Danny Tenenbaum; Marco Borrero; Sizzy Rocket
- Producers: Matoma; Mag; Jayson DeZuzio

Matoma singles chronology
| "Staying Up" (2017) | "Slow" (2017) | "Lonely" (2018) |

Noah Cyrus singles chronology
| "All Falls Down" (2017) | "Slow" (2017) | "Live or Die" (2018) |

"Slow" is a song by Norwegian DJ Matoma featuring American singer Noah Cyrus, released on 17 November 2017 as the lead single from Matoma's second album One in a Million. The track reached the top 30 in Norway and also charted in Sweden and on the US Dance/Electronic Songs chart.

== Writing and recording ==
Matoma heard "Make Me (Cry)" by Noah Cyrus and thought Cyrus' voice has "so much soul and personality", so reached out to her. The two worked apart, with Matoma based in Norway. Matoma also said that with "Slow", he wanted to expand beyond his tropical house sound and "do something different from before" but still put out a "banger" before the album and tour. He later said he wanted to make a song that was "future bass-inspired song with lots of bass and big drums in the chorus".

== Music ==
Paper called "Slow" a "party ballad". Billboard described it as "uplifting, feel-good" and a "lover's pop anthem".

== Music video ==
Matoma and Cyrus also collaborated on a live version of the music video.

== Track listing ==
Digital download and stream
| No. | Title | Length |
|---|---|---|
| 1. | "Slow" (featuring Noah Cyrus) | 3:20 |

Remixes single
| No. | Title | Length |
|---|---|---|
| 1. | "Slow" (featuring Noah Cyrus) (R3hab remix) | 2:40 |
| 2. | "Slow" (featuring Noah Cyrus) (Cid remix) | 3:05 |
| 3. | "Slow" (featuring Noah Cyrus) (Devault remix) | 3:23 |

== Charts ==
| Chart (2017–18) | Peak position |
|---|---|
| Norway (VG-lista) | 30 |
| Sweden (Sverigetopplistan) | 87 |
| US Hot Dance/Electronic Songs (Billboard) | 31 |
