= Feeling Right (Everything Is Nice) =

Promotional single by Matoma featuring Wale and Popcaan

from the album Hakuna Matoma
- Released: October 16, 2015
- Recorded: 2015
- Genre: Tropical house; Hip hop
- Length: 3:19
- Label: Parlophone
- Songwriter(s): Andrae Sutherland; Marc Aaron Glasser; Olubowale Victor Akintimehin; Lagergren
- Producer(s): Matoma

"Feeling Right (Everything Is Nice)" is the debut single by Norwegian DJ and producer Matoma, featuring rapper Wale and Jamaican dancehall artist Popcaan. It was released on October 16, 2015, by Parlophone Records. The song is produced by Matoma and contains choruses, one bridge, and one verse from Popcaan's "Everything Nice". The remaining verses are performed by Wale.

On the release day, Matoma stated on his Facebook page: "My inspiration for this single is a mixture between old school rhythms combined with a chill tropical flavor. When I created the track I wanted to bring Jamaican vibes together with rap vibes and ended up doing a collaboration together with Popcaan & Wale."

== Charts ==
Chart (2015)	Peak position
Norway (VG-lista)	31
