= Cheyenne (Jason Derulo song) =

2015 single by Jason Derulo

Single by Jason Derulo

from the album Everything Is 4
- Released: June 30, 2015
- Recorded: 2014–2015
- Genre: Synth-pop
- Length: 3:35
- Label: Warner Bros.
- Songwriters: Jason Desrouleaux; Ian Kirkpatrick; Samuel Denison Martin; Lindy Robbins; Jason Evigan; Marcus Lomax; Stefan Johnson; Jordan Johnson
- Producers: The Monsters and the Strangerz; Ian Kirkpatrick

Jason Derulo singles chronology
"Try Me" (2015)	"Cheyenne" (2015)	"Follow Me" (2015)

Music video
- "Cheyenne" on YouTube

"Cheyenne" is a song by American singer Jason Derulo, released as the second single for his fourth studio album, Everything Is 4 (2015). The song was written by Jason Derulo, Ian Kirkpatrick, Sam Martin, Lindy Robbins, Jason Evigan, Marcus Lomax, Stefan Johnson and Jordan Johnson, while the song's production was handled by The Monsters and the Strangerz and Kirkpatrick.

Jason Lipshutz of Billboard noted the reminiscence of "Cheyenne" to the works by singer Bruno Mars.

== Music video ==
The song's accompanying music video, directed by Syndrome, premiered via Derulo's YouTube channel on June 30, 2015.

The video begins in a mansion where Derulo is seen waking up tied to a chair and glued to the wall. Cheyenne is approaching him as Derulo falls through to a bed where two hands grabbed him as Cheyenne starts frightening sex with Derulo. Then, Derulo ends up in the table as a demon version of Derulo is seen sitting in front of him. Cheyenne kisses the demon Derulo, causing the real Derulo to lift the table. He then finds himself one floor below Cheyenne, but the floor collapses and Cheyenne walks away. Derulo jumps over the gap, looks for Cheyenne and ends up in the bedroom. This is intercut with scenes of Derulo wearing a purple suit and a hat, now Cheyenne activates zombified princess dancers which surround him and they break into an elaborate dance. Meanwhile, Derulo brings pictures of Cheyenne up which are set on fire. The video ends with Derulo on the chair looking at the burned photograph as it ends with a few images of Cheyenne's dark eye.

Derulo describes the character Cheyenne as a "woman in a red dress [that] haunts" him, as seen in the video.

== Charts ==
Chart (2015)	Peak position
Australia (ARIA)	25
Belgium (Ultratip Bubbling Under Flanders)	6
Belgium (Ultratip Bubbling Under Wallonia)	6
Canada Hot 100 (Billboard)	42
Hungary (Rádiós Top 40)	12
Ireland (IRMA)	85
Israel International Airplay (Media Forest)	1
Lebanon (Lebanese Top 20)	14
Netherlands (Dutch Top 40)	38
Netherlands (Single Top 100)	89
Slovakia Airplay (ČNS IFPI)	15
UK Singles (Official Charts Company)	184
US Billboard Hot 100	66
US Adult Pop Airplay (Billboard)	39
US Dance Airplay (Billboard)	26
US Pop Airplay (Billboard)	18
US Rhythmic Airplay (Billboard)	17

== Certifications ==
Region	Certification	Certified units/sales
Australia (ARIA)	Platinum	70,000^{‡}
^{‡} Sales+streaming figures based on certification alone.
