= Harry Hudson (musician) =

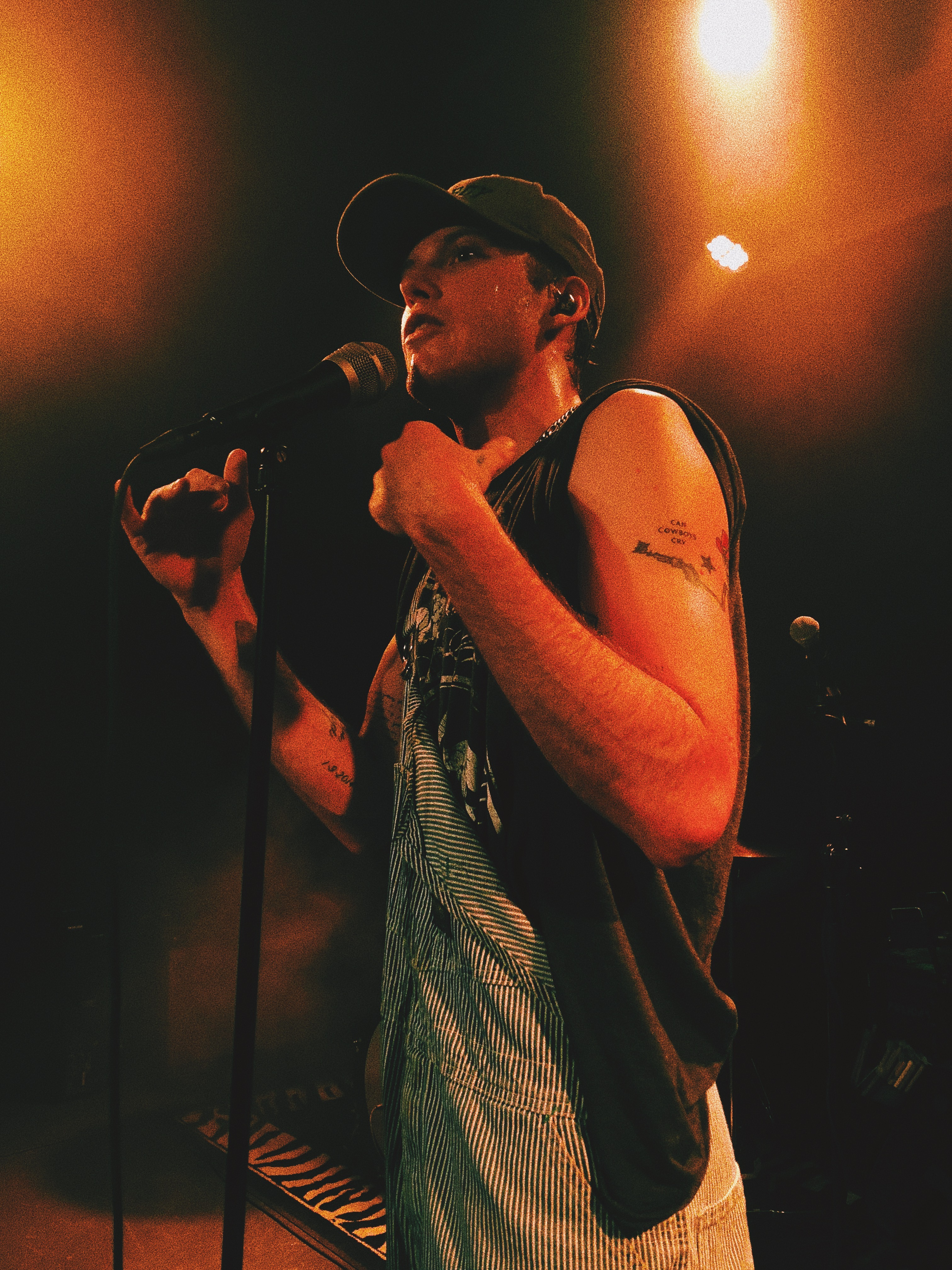
- Harry Hudson in 2018

Background information
- Born: June 2, 1993 (age 33); Englewood, New Jersey, U.S.
- Origin: Los Angeles, California, U.S.
- Genres: Folk rock, pop
- Instruments: Singer, songwriter
- Years active: 2013–present
- Website: harryhudsonmusic.com

Harry Hudson (born June 2, 1993) is an American singer-songwriter of folk rock and pop music. His debut album, Yesterday's Tomorrow Night, was released on Jay-Z's Roc Nation record label in 2018. The single "Yellow Lights" went Top 10 on Spotify's US Viral chart, and Hudson was named one of Pandora’s Artist to Watch 2018 on the music streaming service. His second album, Hey, I'm Here For You, was released in November 2020.

== Early life ==
Hudson was born in Englewood, New Jersey, and at four years old moved to Los Angeles. Early on, he was interested in rap music, but in 2011 he met John Atterberry, the former vice president of Death Row Records, who encouraged him to sing. He already enjoyed pop music, but came to appreciate the country sounds of Johnny Cash, Hank Williams, Kris Kristofferson and Willie Nelson as well as Bob Dylan and Bruce Springsteen. Hudson began to write songs and sing them.

In Los Angeles, Hudson met Kylie and Kendall Jenner, who promoted his music on their social media. That affiliation led to his meeting siblings Willow and Jaden Smith, and ultimately in the formation of MSFTS, an “art collective and lifestyle brand that encompasses music, fashion, education and more.”

== Health crisis ==
At 20, Hudson learned he had Stage 3 Hodgkin’s lymphoma. The journals he made during chemotherapy sessions, as well as the subsequent depression that befell him, inspired many of the independent releases beginning in 2014 with the "Learn 2 Love" single, and the 2015 "Treatment (A-Side)" EP and Gemineyes" single, as well as the entirety of his later debut album in 2018 on the MSFTS/RocNation label called Yesterday’s Tomorrow Night. During the same period, he worked with Teen Cancer America spearheading a fundraiser with the organization to build a treatment center at Vanderbilt University.

After treatment, Hudson moved to New York City, New York with Jaden Smith. While there, he developed an interest in film, and subsequently made one set in Lone Pine, California titled Can Cowboys Cry starring himself and Smith and including his folk-pop songs "Cry for Love", "Yellow Lights", "No Good", and "Gone". The 17-minute film was directed by Directed x MODELS.

== Music career ==
On March 30, 2018, Hudson released his 15-track debut album, Yesterday’s Tomorrow Night, on the MSFTS/Roc Nation label, described as “a sincere and heartfelt record that draws heavy inspiration from his albeit difficult life experiences” by L'Officiel magazine.

The songs include the second single, "Yellow Lights", a piano ballad written by Hudson, and co-produced by fellow MSFTS music artist ¿Téo? and platinum recording artist gnash. It was released January 9, 2018 and premiered on Beats 1 radio as a Zane Lowe World First. “Yellow Lights” reached Top 10 on Spotify’s U.S. Viral chart Another piano-driven track, "Love, Dad", was written just after the death of Hudson’s father and the singer says the song feels “like I channeled him.”

Hudson sold out his first-ever headlining shows in Los Angeles, California on May 1, 2018 at the Troubadour and in New York City on May 9, 2018 at Brooklyn’s Rough Trade. Also in early 2018, he made a Pandora 2018 SXSW appearance, and performed on the Bud Light 2018 SXSW stage as well. Hudson opened for Kygo on the Kids in Love Tour 2018.

Hudson is scheduled to perform throughout 2018 at Bud Light Stages at several summer festivals. He will also appear at the Life Is Beautiful festival in Las Vegas, Nevada on September 22.

On November 20, 2020, Hudson released his second album, Hey, I'm Here For You. The album included collaborations with close friend Jaden Smith and Norwegian singer Astrid S.

== Discography ==
- Yesterday’s Tomorrow Night (2018)
- Hey, I'm Here For You (2020)
- A Deer in Headlights EP (2022)
