= Want to Want Me =

Single by Jason Derulo

from the album Everything Is 4
- Released: March 9, 2015
- Recorded: 2014
- Genre: Disco; pop; power pop
- Length: 3:27
- Label: Warner Bros.
- Songwriters: Jason Desrouleaux; Ian Kirkpatrick; Samuel Denison Martin; Lindy Robbins; Mitch Allan
- Producer: Ian Kirkpatrick

Jason Derulo singles chronology
"Bubblegum" (2014)	"Want to Want Me" (2015)	"Try Me" (2015)

Music video
- "Want to Want Me" on YouTube

"Want to Want Me" is a song recorded by American singer Jason Derulo for his fourth studio album, Everything Is 4 (2015). It was released as the album's lead single on March 9, 2015. The song was written by Derulo, Sam Martin, Lindy Robbins, Mitch Allan, and its producer, Ian Kirkpatrick.

"Want to Want Me" peaked at number five on the Billboard Hot 100, becoming Derulo's sixth top ten hit in the United States. The song topped the UK Singles Chart with first-week sales of 127,000 units. It marked Derulo's fourth number-one single in the United Kingdom, following "In My Head" (2010), "Don't Wanna Go Home" (2011) and "Talk Dirty" (2013). "Want to Want Me" remained at number one in the UK for four weeks. It also reached number one in Austria, Israel, and South Africa, as well as the top ten in seventeen additional countries. It was the third-bestselling song of 2015 in Israel. It is certified Gold or higher in eighteen countries.

== Background ==
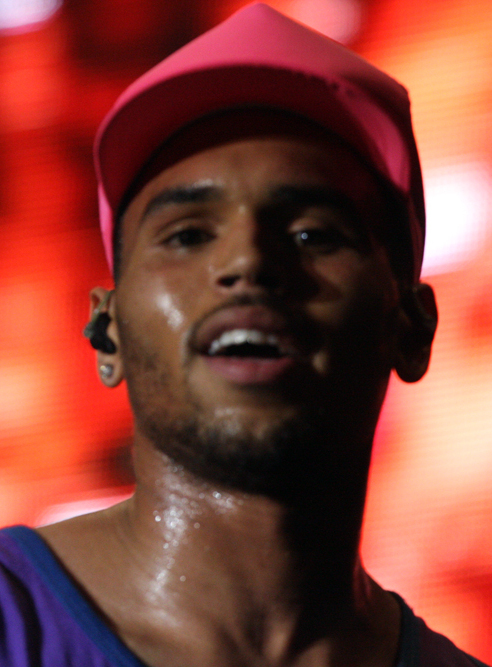
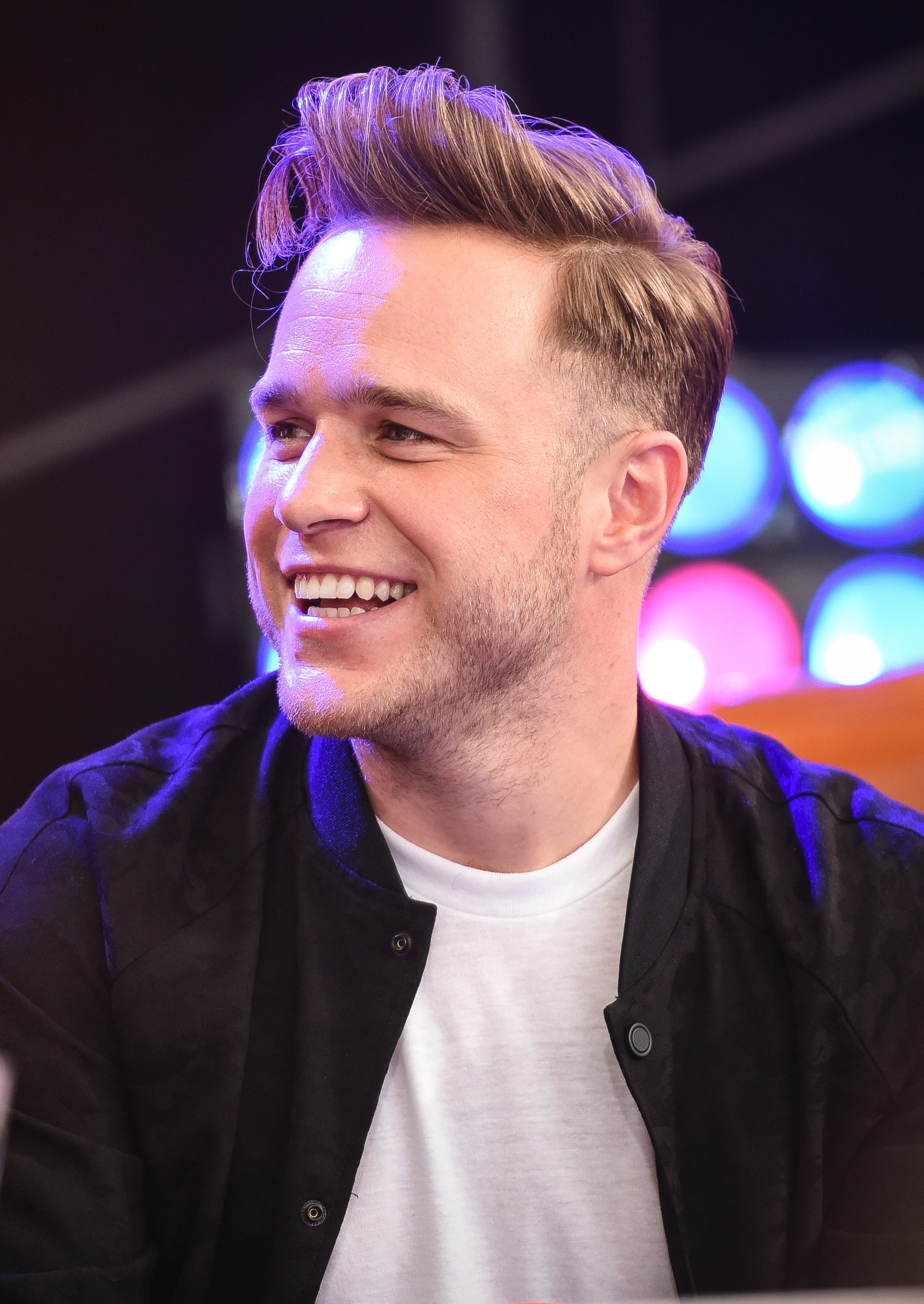
"Want to Want Me" was rejected by Chris Brown (left) and Olly Murs (right) prior to being handed to Derulo.

Derulo said that the song was the first one recorded for his album Everything Is 4, and he decided to release it as the lead single after having several friends listen to it.

The song was originally intended to be on Chris Brown's 2014 album X, and was featured on the album's original track listing, titled "Want You to Want Me", but the singer eventually decided to replace it with the track "Drunk Texting".

According to some news reports, also Olly Murs recorded a version of "Want to Want Me", wanting to release the song as his single, but he was forced to reject it as his voice wasn't high enough to reach the high notes. Murs later admitted to regretting turning it down after seeing how popular of a smash hit it became.

== Music composition ==
The song is written and recorded in E♭ major, running at 112-116 beats per minute. It has a main chord progression of E♭-Cm.

== Critical reception ==
Time named "Want to Want Me" the eighth-best song of 2015. Pitchfork praised it for being "Derulo's best song, a crisp, feel-good blast of infatuated power-pop that feels warmer and more lived-in than any of his previous singles." Stereogum also praised the track, describing it as "an absolute monster of a pop song".

== Commercial performance ==
"Want to Want Me" debuted at number 45 on the Billboard Hot 100 chart on March 28, 2015. It jumped to number ten on the week of May 9, 2015, before reaching number five dated June 20.

== Music video ==
The song's accompanying music video was directed by Colin Tilley. It premiered on Tinder on March 23, 2015. The video features glamour model Tianna Gregory as Derulo's love interest in the video.

== Track listing ==
Digital download

1. "Want to Want Me" – 3:27

Digital download – Westfunk remix

1. "Want to Want Me" (Westfunk Remix) – 3:13

Other Versions

- 7th Heaven Club Mix - 7:45
- 7th Heaven Radio Edit – 3:27

== Credits and personnel ==
Credits adapted from Tidal and the liner notes of Everything Is 4.

- Sam Martin – Backing Vocals
- Nate Merchant – Engineer
- Chris Gehringer – Mastering Engineer
- John Hanes – Mixing Engineer
- Serban Ghenea – Mixing Engineer
- Frank Ramirez – Recording Engineer
- JP Negrete – Recording Engineer

== Charts ==
=== Weekly charts ===
Chart (2015–2016)	Peak position
Australia (ARIA)	4
Austria (Ö3 Austria Top 40)	1
Belgium (Ultratop 50 Flanders)	18
Belgium (Ultratop 50 Wallonia)	17
Canada Hot 100 (Billboard)	5
Canada AC (Billboard)	4
Canada CHR/Top 40 (Billboard)	2
Canada Hot AC (Billboard)	4
CIS Airplay (TopHit)	14
Czech Republic Airplay (ČNS IFPI)	2
Czech Republic Singles Digital (ČNS IFPI)	9
Denmark (Tracklisten)	5
Euro Digital Song Sales (Billboard)	1
Finland (Suomen virallinen lista)	17
France (SNEP)	6
France Airplay (SNEP)	1
Germany (GfK)	2
Germany Airplay (BVMI)	1
Hungary (Rádiós Top 40)	39
Hungary (Single Top 40)	14
Hungary (Stream Top 40)	8
Ireland (IRMA)	3
Italy (FIMI)	8
Israel International Airplay (Media Forest)	1
Japan Hot 100 (Billboard)	31
Lebanon (Lebanese Top 20)	8
Mexico (Billboard Mexican Airplay)	5
Mexico Anglo (Monitor Latino)	4
Netherlands (Dutch Top 40)	6
Netherlands (Single Top 100)	7
New Zealand (Recorded Music NZ)	3
Norway (VG-lista)	16
Poland Airplay (ZPAV)	4
Romania TV Airplay (Media Forest)	6
Russia Airplay (TopHit)	15
Scottish Singles Sales (Official Charts)	1
Slovakia Singles Digital (ČNS IFPI)	9
Slovenia (SloTop50)	2
South Africa Airplay (EMA)	1
Spain (PROMUSICAE)	6
Sweden (Sverigetopplistan)	13
Switzerland (Schweizer Hitparade)	3
Ukraine Airplay (TopHit)	86
UK Singles (Official Charts)	1
US Billboard Hot 100	5
US Adult Contemporary (Billboard)	8
US Adult Pop Airplay (Billboard)	3
US Dance Airplay (Billboard)	1
US Dance Club Songs (Billboard)	24
US Pop Airplay (Billboard)	1
US Rhythmic Airplay (Billboard)	4

=== Monthly charts ===
Monthly chart performance for "Want to Want Me"
Chart (2015)	Peak position
CIS Airplay (TopHit)	19
Russia Airplay (TopHit)	18
Ukraine Airplay (TopHit)	95

=== Year-end charts ===
Chart (2015)	Position
Australia (ARIA)	24
Austria (Ö3 Austria Top 40)	13
Belgium (Ultratop Flanders)	60
Belgium (Ultratop Wallonia)	51
Canada (Canadian Hot 100)	12
CIS Airplay (TopHit)	103
France (SNEP)	23
Germany (Official German Charts)	16
Hungary (Single Top 40)	53
Israel (Media Forest)	3
Italy (FIMI)	15
Netherlands (Dutch Top 40)	21
Netherlands (Single Top 100)	24
New Zealand (Recorded Music NZ)	15
Poland (Polish Airplay Top 100)	7
Russia Airplay (TopHit)	103
Slovenia (SloTop50)	20
Spain (PROMUSICAE)	11
Sweden (Sverigetopplistan)	27
Switzerland (Schweizer Hitparade)	13
UK Singles (OCC)	16
US Billboard Hot 100	17
US Adult Contemporary (Billboard)	18
US Adult Top 40 (Billboard)	12
US Dance/Mix Show Airplay (Billboard)	14
US Mainstream Top 40 (Billboard)	11
US Rhythmic (Billboard)	21

Chart (2016)	Position
Argentina (Monitor Latino)	67
France (SNEP)	174
US Adult Contemporary (Billboard)	23

== Certifications and sales ==
Certifications and sales for "Want to Want Me"
Region	Certification	Certified units/sales
Australia (ARIA)	5× Platinum	350,000^{‡}
Austria (IFPI Austria)	Gold	15,000^{‡}
Belgium (BRMA)	Gold	15,000^{*}
Canada (Music Canada)	5× Platinum	400,000^{‡}
Denmark (IFPI Danmark)	3× Platinum	270,000^{‡}
France (SNEP)	Gold	75,000^{*}
Germany (BVMI)	3× Gold	600,000^{‡}
Italy (FIMI)	4× Platinum	200,000^{‡}
Mexico (AMPROFON)	Gold	30,000^{*}
New Zealand (RMNZ)	4× Platinum	120,000^{‡}
Norway (IFPI Norway)	2× Platinum	80,000^{‡}
Poland (ZPAV)	Platinum	50,000^{‡}
Portugal (AFP)	Gold	10,000^{‡}
Spain (Promusicae)	2× Platinum	80,000^{‡}
Sweden (GLF)	3× Platinum	120,000^{‡}
Switzerland (IFPI Switzerland)	Platinum	30,000^{‡}
United Kingdom (BPI)	3× Platinum	1,800,000^{‡}
United States (RIAA)	4× Platinum	4,000,000^{‡}
^{*} Sales figures based on certification alone.^{‡} Sales+streaming figures based on certification alone.
