= Everything Is 4 =

Studio album by Jason Derulo
- Released: May 29, 2015
- Recorded: 2014–2015
- Genres: Pop; R&B
- Length: 38:44
- Labels: Beluga Heights; Warner Bros.
- Producers: Ian Kirkpatrick; Charlie Puth; Ricky Reed; The Monsters and the Strangerz; Cook Classics; Mr. Collipark; Hitmaka; Foreign Teck; Dreamstate; Johan Carlsson; Matoma; Mag; Pop & Oak; The Starr Island Group; Nathaniel "Danja" Hills; Heston Valley; Sonny Alves

Jason Derulo chronology
Talk Dirty (2014)	Everything Is 4 (2015)	Platinum Hits (2016)

Singles from Everything Is 4
- 1. "Want to Want Me" Released: March 9, 2015; 2. "Try Me" Released: May 26, 2015; 3. "Cheyenne" Released: June 30, 2015; 4. "Get Ugly" Released: December 15, 2015

Everything Is 4 is the fourth studio album by American singer Jason Derulo. It was released on May 29, 2015, by Beluga Heights Records and Warner Bros. Records. The lead single "Want to Want Me" which reached number one in six countries, was released on March 9, 2015. The album is a follow-up to Derulo's previous studio album, Tattoos (2013) in the international market and Talk Dirty (2014) in the United States.

Additionally, this is also Derulo's final studio album released under both Beluga Heights and Warner, before parting ways due to creative differences in May 2020, and was also his final studio album for nine years until 2024's Nu King.

== Background ==
The first song produced for the album was the first single, "Want to Want Me", which Derulo made the lead single after listening it to with several friends. For the song "Painkiller", a duet featuring singer-songwriter Meghan Trainor, the singer revealed that he decided to include her on the song after meeting her backstage at a couple of shows. The collaboration with Stevie Wonder in "Broke" was born during a dinner at the White House.

Derulo explained the significance of the title saying: "It's called Everything is 4 because it's my fourth album, but there are also other meanings. All happens for a reason, everything is for my mom, and everything is for my fans. Everything is for myself to prove that I can do it. Everything is for the future. I could go on, but in the end the meaning is "Everything happens for a reason". Then there is also the meaning of the number 4: a chair has four legs, a table even. They are also 4 seasons, representing change. So 4 is a number that follows us everywhere. 4 is symmetrical. Then, Everything is 4."

== Singles ==
"Want to Want Me" was released on March 9, 2015, as the album's lead single. Commercially, it was a success, reaching top positions in Austria and the United Kingdom. The song debuted at number 45 on the Billboard Hot 100, with 50,000 copies sold, since then it has peaked at number 5. The song's music video premiered on March 23, 2015. As of June 2015, "Want to Want Me" has sold 1.1 million digital copies in the United States.

The album's second single "Cheyenne", was released on June 30. The song peaked at number 66 on the Billboard Hot 100.

"Try Me" was released in October 2015 as the album's third single outside of the United States. It reached the top 5 in Norway and Poland, and was certified 2× Platinum in Norway.

"Get Ugly" was released in December 2015 as the album's fourth and final single. It was certified Gold in the US and Silver in the UK.

== Critical reception ==
Professional ratings
Aggregate scores
Source	Rating
AnyDecentMusic?	5.8/10
Metacritic	67/100
Review scores
Source	Rating
AllMusic	3.5/5 stars
Billboard	3/5 stars
Clash	2/10
Knoxville News Sentinel	3.5/5 stars
Newsday	B+
Pitchfork	6.6/10
Rolling Stone	3/5 stars
Slant Magazine	4/5 stars
Spin	8/10
Vice	A−

On Metacritic, which assigns a weighted mean rating out of 100 to reviews from music critics, Everything Is 4 received an average score of 67, indicating "generally favorable reviews", based on 9 reviews. AllMusic wrote: "No one's looking to Derulo for advanced stylistic hybrids or deep thoughts. When Everything Is 4 avoids those creative impulses, as it tends to do, it's easily Derulo's most pleasing work." Billboard noted that "Derulo does a little bit of everything on Everything, sometimes stretching himself too thin but finding a few more no-brainer pop hits along the way." In contrast, Clash gave a negative review, stating that "'Everything Is 4' will probably spawn a couple of moderately successful singles, but nothing that will still be remembered by Christmas. It's disappointing stuff from an artist who has previously shown that he's not afraid to try something a little bit different." Pitchfork argued that "for all its blatantly ill-conceived moments, there's something charming about the sheer audacity of Derulo's often bizarre choices. Even when it falls flat, there is character here". Writing for Vice, Robert Christgau said "his gimmicky pop r&b reminds me more of the peppy Ford Focus. At least three different ways to say ooh-ooh-ooh."

== Commercial performance ==
Everything Is 4 became Derulo's highest-charting album on the US Billboard 200, where it debuted at number four and sold 22,000 copies in its first week. The album also debuted at number ten on the Canadian Albums Chart, with 2,500 copies sold. In its second week of release, the album dropped drastically to number 23 on the chart, selling 6,000 more copies. In its third week, the album dropped to number 39 on the chart, selling an additional 4,000 copies. In its fourth week, the album dropped to number 43 on the chart, selling 3,000 copies. As of June 2016, the album had sold 80,000 copies.

== Track listing ==
No.	Title	Writer(s)	Producer(s)	Length
1.	"Want to Want Me"	Jason Desrouleaux; Ian Kirkpatrick; Samuel Martin; Lindy Robbins; Mitch Allan	Kirkpatrick	3:27
2.	"Cheyenne"	Desrouleaux; Kirkpatrick; Martin; Robbins; Jason Evigan; Marcus Lomax; Stefan Johnson	The Monsters and the Strangerz; Kirkpatrick	3:35
3.	"Get Ugly"	Desrouleaux; Evigan; Eric Frederic; Sean Douglas	Ricky Reed	3:20
4.	"Pull-Up"	Desrouleaux; Will Lobban-Bean; Charlie Puth; Alexander "Xplicit" Izquierdo; Michael Crooms	Cook Classics; Mr. Collipark; Charlie Puth (co.)	3:06
5.	"Love Like That" (featuring K. Michelle)	Desrouleaux; Christian Ward; Michael Hernandez; Rico Evans; Arin Ray; Lyrica Anderson; Floyd Bentley; Jordan Hollywood	Hitmaka; The Mekanics; Dreamstate	3:59
6.	"Painkiller" (featuring Meghan Trainor)	Desrouleaux; Johan Carlsson; Ross Golan; Meghan Trainor	Carlsson; Mag	3:23
7.	"Broke" (featuring Stevie Wonder and Keith Urban)	Desrouleaux; Charlie Puth; David Brook	Puth	3:06
8.	"Try Me" (featuring Jennifer Lopez and Matoma)	Desrouleaux; Robbins; Shy Carter; Marvin Gaye; Odell Brown; David Ritz	Frank Harris; Derulo; Matoma	3:20
9.	"Love Me Down"	Desrouleaux; Kirkpatrick; Taylor Parks	Kirkpatrick	2:45
10.	"Trade Hearts" (featuring Julia Michaels)	Desrouleaux; Julia Michaels; Andrew "Pop" Wansel; Warren "Oak" Felder	Pop & Oak	3:30
11.	"X2CU" (includes hidden track "Angel Wings" starting at 3:35)	Desrouleaux; Floyd Hills; Marcella Araica; Douglas; BJ Mekk; James Roston; Sonny Alves	Danja	5:13
Total length:				38:44

== Charts ==
=== Weekly charts ===
Chart (2015)	Peak position
Australian Albums (ARIA)	12
Austrian Albums (Ö3 Austria)	33
Belgian Albums (Ultratop Flanders)	46
Belgian Albums (Ultratop Wallonia)	75
Canadian Albums (Billboard)	10
Danish Albums (Hitlisten)	3
Dutch Albums (Album Top 100)	31
Finnish Albums (Suomen virallinen lista)	9
French Albums (SNEP)	44
German Albums (Offizielle Top 100)	23
Hungarian Albums (MAHASZ)	9
Irish Albums (IRMA)	30
Italian Albums (FIMI)	38
Japanese Albums (Oricon)	44
New Zealand Albums (RMNZ)	20
Norwegian Albums (VG-lista)	1
Scottish Albums (Official Charts)	17
Spanish Albums (Promusicae)	8
Swedish Albums (Sverigetopplistan)	3
Swiss Albums (Schweizer Hitparade)	13
UK Albums (Official Charts)	16
UK R&B Albums (Official Charts)	1
US Billboard 200	4

=== Year-end charts ===
Chart (2015)	Position
Danish Albums (Hitlisten)	19
Swedish Albums (Sverigetopplistan)	24
US Billboard 200	135
Chart (2016)	Position
Danish Albums (Hitlisten)	48
Swedish Albums (Sverigetopplistan)	66

== Certifications ==
Region	Certification	Certified units/sales
Canada (Music Canada)	Platinum	80,000^{‡}
Denmark (IFPI Danmark)	Platinum	20,000^{‡}
New Zealand (RMNZ)	Platinum	15,000^{‡}
Norway (IFPI Norway)	Gold	15,000^{‡}
Poland (ZPAV)	Gold	10,000^{‡}
Sweden (GLF)	Gold	20,000^{‡}
United Kingdom (BPI)	Silver	60,000^{‡}
United States (RIAA)	Gold	500,000^{‡}
^{‡} Sales+streaming figures based on certification alone.

== Release history ==
Region	Date	Version	Format	Label
Australia	May 29, 2015	Standard edition	Digital download; CD	Warner Bros. Records
Canada	May 29, 2015	Standard edition	Digital download; CD	Warner Bros. Records
United States	May 29, 2015	Standard edition	Digital download; CD	Warner Bros. Records
Japan	May 29, 2015	Standard edition	Digital download; CD	Warner Bros. Records
Belgium	May 29, 2015	Standard edition	Digital download; CD	Warner Bros. Records
Finland	May 29, 2015	Standard edition	Digital download; CD	Warner Bros. Records
Germany	May 29, 2015	Standard edition	Digital download; CD	Warner Bros. Records
Netherlands	May 29, 2015	Standard edition	Digital download; CD	Warner Bros. Records
New Zealand	May 29, 2015	Standard edition	Digital download; CD	Warner Bros. Records
Denmark	June 1, 2015	Standard edition	Digital download; CD	Warner Bros. Records
Italy	June 1, 2015	Standard edition	Digital download; CD	Warner Bros. Records
France	June 1, 2015	Standard edition	Digital download; CD	Warner Bros. Records
Norway	June 1, 2015	Standard edition	Digital download; CD	Warner Bros. Records
Sweden	June 1, 2015	Standard edition	Digital download; CD	Warner Bros. Records
South Africa	June 1, 2015	Standard edition	Digital download; CD	Warner Bros. Records
United Kingdom	June 1, 2015	Standard edition	Digital download; CD	Warner Bros. Records
Spain	June 2, 2015	Standard edition	Digital download; CD	Warner Bros. Records
