= Joyride (Astrid S album) =

Studio album by Astrid S
- Released: 24 May 2024
- Recorded: 2022–2023
- Studio: RØE Studio
- Genre: Pop; indie pop; soft rock; country pop; synth-pop; alt-pop; folk; indie rock
- Length: 26:22
- Label: Universal; Island
- Producer: Astrid S; JT Daly; Jack Schrepferman; John Mark Nelson; Jonas Jurström; Matias Tellez; Oliver Lundström; The Nocturns

Astrid S chronology
Felt Cute Might Delete Later (2023)	Joyride (2024)	Hver Gang Vi Møtes 2025 (2025)

Singles from Joyride
- 1. "Two Hands" Released: 12 January 2024; 2. "First to Go" Released: 23 February 2024; 3. "Oh Emma" Released: 5 April 2024; 4. "Hot Fever Dream" Released: 3 May 2024

Joyride is the second studio album by Norwegian singer-songwriter Astrid S. It was released on 24 May 2024, through Universal and Island Records. The album was preceded by the release of four singles: "Two Hands", "First to Go", "Oh Emma" and "Hot Fever Dream".

== Concept and music ==
Astrid S about the concept behind the album

"The pieces fell into place after I wrote the first song for Joyride. It's a road trip album and a tribute to childhood memories and all the hours in the car with dad."

"This album is inspired by all the roadtrips I’ve had with my dad growing up and the music we listened to. And my never ending failing love life. Hehe. And friends who part ways. And falling in love! And everything in between.

== Release and promotion ==
Joyride was released through Universal and Island Records on 24 May 2024. It is available on streaming, digital download, and vinyl LP.

=== Marketing ===
Astrid unveiled the album's cover, title and tracklist on 21 April 2024.

=== Singles ===
Described by Astrid as "a letter to my future partners" song, "Two Hands" was released on 12 January 2024, as the lead single from the album. The music video for this track was released on the same day. The track peaked at number 33 on Norway VG-lista.

"First to Go" was released on 23 February 2024, as the album's second single.

"Oh Emma" was released on 5 April 2024, as the album's third single.

"Hot Fever Dream" was released on 3 May 2024 as the album's fourth single.

== Track listing ==
Joyride track listing
No.	Title	Writer(s)	Producer(s)	Length
1.	"First to Go"	Astrid Smeplass; Justin Thomas Daly; Trent Dabbs; Morgan Nagler	JT Daly; Jack Schrepferman	2:53
2.	"Two Hands"	Smeplass; Ines Dunn; Matias Tellez	Tellez	3:02
3.	"Joyride"	Smeplass; Nick Hahn; Charlie Martin	The Nocturns	2:59
4.	"Oh Emma"	Smeplass; Daly; Sean Van Vleet; Emily Falvey	JT Daly; Schrepferman	3:34
5.	"Hot Fever Dream"	Smeplass; Daly; Oliver Lundström; Lara Anderson	Smeplass; Lundström	2:27
6.	"Power Move"	Smeplass; Daly; Lundström; Anderson	Smeplass; Lundström	2:31
7.	"Bloodline"	Smeplass; Jonas Jurström; Maria Jane Smith	Jurström	3:02
8.	"I'm Sorry, I Love You"	Smeplass; John Mark Nelson	Nelson	2:27
9.	"Howdy"	Smeplass; Daly; Vleet; Falvey	JT Daly	3:27
Total length:				26:22

== Charts ==
Chart performance for Joyride
Chart (2024)	Peak position
Norwegian Albums (VG-lista)	10

== Release history ==
Release history and formats for Joyride
Region	Date	Format(s)	Label(s)	Ref.
Various	24 May 2024	digital download; streaming; vinyl LP	Universal; Island	
