= Hakuna Matoma =

Studio album by Matoma
- Released: 13 November 2015
- Recorded: 2014–15
- Genre: Tropical house
- Length: 60:00
- Label: Warner Music Group
- Producers: Matoma; Astrid S; Daniel Davidson; Peter Wallevik; Cutfather; MNEK; Jay Renolds; KOZ; Catherine Winder; John Cohen; Kevin Weaver; Rik Simpson; Stargate; Akon; Rick Ruth; Frank Harris; Jason Derulo; Julien Bunetta; Jesse Shatkin; Afterhrs; Jacob Olofsson; Samuraii

Matoma chronology
Hakuna Matoma (2015)	One in a Million (2018)

Singles from Hakuna Matoma
- 1. "Old Thing Back" Released: 24 February 2015; 2. "Stick Around" Released: 20 November 2015; 3. "Running Out" Released: 1 December 2015; 4. "Paradise" Released: 15 April 2016; 5. "Wonderful Life (Mi Oh My)" Released: 2016; 6. "Take Me Back" Released: 23 June 2016; 7. "False Alarm" Released: 24 June 2016

Hakuna Matoma is the debut studio album by DJ and record producer Matoma. It was released on 13 November 2015 through Warner Music Group. It features collaborations and vocals from the likes of Becky Hill, Dua Lipa, Christopher, Sean Paul, KStewart, Coldplay, Astrid S, Popcaan, Wale, Akon, Madcon, Frenship, Dboy, Jason Derulo, Jennifer Lopez, Nico & Vinz, One Direction, The Notorious B.I.G., Ralph Tresvant and Ja Rule.

== Singles ==
"Old Thing Back" was released as the album's lead single on 30 April 2015. The track is a remix offeatures vocals from American rapper The Notorious B.I.G., along with singers Ralph Tresvant and Ja Rule.

"Running Out" featuring Astrid S was released on 1 December 2016 as the album's third single. Its accompanying music video was released on 31 March 2016.

"False Alarm" was released on 24 June 2016 as the seventh single from the album. It features vocals by English singer-songwriter Becky Hill. The song marked Matoma's first UK Top 40 entry and Hill's third, peaking at number 28.

=== Promotional singles ===
In order to promote the album, Matoma released a series of promotional singles throughout a year before its release, the first one, "Feeling Right (Everything Is Nice)" was released on 12 October 2015. It features American rapper Wale and Jamaican recording artist Popcaan.

"Find Love" featuring music group Dboy, "Knives" featuring American electronic duo Frenship, "Love You Right" featuring fellow Norwegian duo Nico & Vinz and "The Wave" featuring Norwegian duo Madcon, were all simultaneously released on 12 November 2015 as the next four promotional singles from the album. The songs were first uploaded to Matoma's YouTube channel and made available for purchase and streaming the next day.

=== Other songs ===
The album features "Wonderful Life (Mi Oh My)" (with guest vocals by Leslie Green), a track made for The Angry Birds Movie soundtrack. As well as remixes of Dua Lipa's "Hotter Than Hell", Coldplay's "Adventure of A Lifetime", One Direction's "Perfect", Astrid S' "2AM", and an acoustic version of "False Alarm".

== Track listing ==
No.	Title	Writer(s)	Producer(s)	Length
1.	"False Alarm" (with Becky Hill)	Tom Lagergren; Rebecca Hill; Daniel Heløy Davidsen; James Newman; Kara DioGuardi; Mich Hansen; Peter Wallevik	Davidson; PhD; Matoma; Cutfather; MNEK	3:44
2.	"False Alarm" (acoustic; with Becky Hill)	Davidson; Newman; DioGuardi; Hansen; Wallevik; Hill; Lagergren	Matoma	2:57
3.	"Hotter than Hell" (by Dua Lipa; Matoma Remix)	Adam Midgley; Dua Lipa; Gerald O'Connell; Tommy Baxter	Jay Renolds; KOZ; Matoma (remixing)	3:39
4.	"Take Me Back" (with Christopher)	Christopher Lund Nissen; Jayrah Gibson; Jussifer; Lagergren	Matoma	2:58
5.	"Wonderful Life (Mi Oh My)"	Ammar Malik; John Theodore Geiger II; Lagergren	Catherine Winder; John Cohen; Kevin Weaver	3:30
6.	"Paradise" (with Sean Paul featuring KStewart)	Bonnie Leigh McKee; Jason Henriques; Sean Henriques; Lagergren	Matoma	3:04
7.	"Running Out" (with Astrid S)	Astrid Smeplass; Lagergren	Astrid S; Matoma	3:31
8.	"Adventure of a Lifetime" (by Coldplay; Matoma Remix)	Chris Martin; Guy Berryman; Jonathan Buckland; Mikkel Eriksson; Tor Hermansen; William Champion	Rik Simpson; Stargate; Matoma (remixing)	4:10
9.	"Feeling Right (Everything Is Nice)" (featuring Popcaan and Wale)	Andrae Sutherland; Marc Aaron Glasser; Olubowale Victor Akintimehin; Lagergren	Matoma	3:19
10.	"Stick Around" (with Akon)	Aliaume "Akon" Thiam; Lagergren	Akon; Matoma	3:30
11.	"The Wave" (featuring Madcon)	Rachel Keen; Lagergren; Tshawe Baqwa; Yosef Wolde-Mariam	Matoma	2:58
12.	"Knives" (with Frenship)	Brett Hite; James Sunderland; Nick Ruth; Lagergren	Matoma; Ruth	3:28
13.	"Find Love" (featuring D-Boy)	Cato Sundberg; Kent Sundberg; Lagergren	Matoma	3:24
14.	"Try Me" (Jason Derulo featuring Jennifer Lopez and Matoma)	Blake Carter; David Ritz; Jason Desrouleaux; Lindy Robbins; Marvin Gaye; Odell Brown	Frank Harris; Jason Derulo; Matoma	3:20
15.	"Love You Right" (featuring Nico & Vinz)	Kahouly "Nico" Sereba; Vincent "Vinz" Dery; Lagergren	Matoma	2:59
16.	"Perfect" (by One Direction; Matoma Remix)	Harry Styles; Julien Bunetta; Jesse Shatkin; Louis Tomlinson; John Ryan; Jacob Kasher; Maureen McDonald	Bunetta; Shatkin; Afterhrs; Matoma (remixing)	3:43
17.	"2AM" (by Astrid S; Matoma Remix)	Smeplass; Jacob Olofsson; Paolo "Shirazi" Prudencio	Olofsson; Matoma (remixing)	3:55
18.	"Old Thing Back" (with The Notorious B.I.G. featuring Ralph Tresvant and Ja Rule)	Carl E. Thompson; Christopher Wallace; Jack Knight; Jeffery Atkins; Norman A. Glover; Reginald Ellis; Sean Combs	Matoma	5:21
19.	"Running Out" (Samuraii Remix)	Smeplass; Lagergren	Astrid S; Matoma; Samuraii (remixing)	2:54
Total length:				60:00
