= Running Out (Matoma and Astrid S song) =

Single by Matoma & Astrid S

from the album Hakuna Matoma
- Released: 1 December 2015
- Recorded: 2015
- Genre: Tropical house
- Length: 3:31
- Label: FFRR; Big Beat
- Songwriters: Astrid Smeplass; Tom Stræte Lagergren
- Producer: Matoma

Matoma singles chronology
"Stick Around" (2015)	"Running Out" (2015)	"Paradise" (2016)

Astrid S singles chronology
"Paper Thin" (2015)	"Running Out" (2015)	"Dust" (2016)

"Running Out" is a single recorded by Norwegian DJ and music producer Matoma and Norwegian singer-songwriter Astrid S.

== Music video ==
The official music video was published to YouTube on 31 March 2016. On May 13, a remix album containing four remixes of “Running Out” by Throttle & Niko The Kid, Kream, Samuraii and Alexander Lewis went on sale.

== Track listing ==
Digital download
No.	Title	Length
1.	"Running Out"	3:31

== Charts ==
=== Weekly charts ===
Chart (2015)	Peak position
Norway (VG-lista)	7
Sweden (Sverigetopplistan)	57
US Hot Dance/Electronic Songs (Billboard)	14

=== Year-end charts ===
Chart (2016)	Position
US Hot Dance/Electronic Songs (Billboard)	34

== Certifications ==
Certifications for "Running Out"
Region	Certification	Certified units/sales
Canada (Music Canada)	Gold	40,000^{‡}
Norway (IFPI Norway)	2× Platinum	80,000^{‡}
Sweden (GLF)	Platinum	40,000^{‡}
United States (RIAA)	Gold	500,000^{‡}
^{‡} Sales+streaming figures based on certification alone.
