= Leave It Beautiful =

- Standard edition cover. On the Complete edition, Astrid's robe is colored pink instead of yellow.

Studio album by Astrid S
- Released: 16 October 2020
- Recorded: 2020
- Genre: Electropop; synth-pop
- Length: 28:30
- Label: Universal; Virgin EMI
- Producer: Astrid S; Jack & Coke; Fred Ball; A Strut

Astrid S chronology
Down Low (2019)	Leave It Beautiful (2020)	Felt Cute Might Delete Later (2023)

Singles from Leave It Beautiful
- 1. "Dance Dance Dance" Released: 5 June 2020; 2. "Marilyn Monroe" Released: 21 August 2020; 3. "It's Ok If You Forget Me" Released: 18 September 2020

Leave It Beautiful is the debut studio album by Norwegian singer Astrid S, released on 16 October 2020 by Universal Music A/S and Virgin EMI. It followed a string of five extended plays and several singles and collaborations. It was announced on 15 September 2020 and was preceded by the three singles, "Dance Dance Dance", "Marilyn Monroe", and "It's Ok If You Forget Me".

== Background and development ==
Astrid's first release of 2020 was a collaboration with American country singer Brett Young titled "I Do"; the song reached at number three in Norway. On 27 May 2020, Astrid announced the lead single "Dance Dance Dance" from her debut studio album would be released the following week on 5 June. The music video premiered a day later on 6 June. The second single, "Marilyn Monroe" was announced on 19 August 2020 and was released two days later. On 15 September 2020, Astrid announced her debut studio album would be titled Leave It Beautiful and would be released on 16 October 2020. On 16 September, she announced the third single, "It's Ok If You Forget Me", which was released two days later on 18 September 2020.

== Critical reception ==
Leave It Beautiful received positive reviews from music critics. Elosie Bulmer from The Line of Best Fit stated that "Astrid S’ debut is a sleek collection of pop filled exuberance and relatability".

Professional ratings
Review scores
Source	Rating
RIOT	7/10 stars
The Line of Best Fit	8/10 stars
Evening Standard	4/5 stars
Idolator	4/5 stars

== Track listing ==
All tracks produced by Jack & Coke alongside Astrid S, except for "Marilyn Monroe" produced alongside Fred Ball, and "Leave It Beautiful", produced alongside A Strut.

No.	Title	Writer(s)	Length
1.	"Marilyn Monroe"	Astrid Smeplass; Eyelar Mirzazadeh; Frederik Ball; Frederik Eichen; Jakob Hazell; Svante Halldin	2:54
2.	"Can't Forget"	Smeplass; James Norton; J. Hazell; Halldin	2:53
3.	"Hits Different"	Smeplass; Tia Scola; J. Hazell; Halldin	2:38
4.	"It's Okay If You Forget Me"	Smeplass; Caroline Pennell; J. Hazell; Halldin	3:24
5.	"Dance Dance Dance"	Smeplass; Litens Anton Nilsson; J. Hazell; Halldin	2:39
6.	"Airpods"	Smeplass; Amy Wadge; J. Hazell; Halldin	2:12
7.	"Good Choices"	Smeplass; Caroline Furoyen; Henry Flint; George Flint	3:35
8.	"Obsessed"	Smeplass; J. Hazell; Halldin	2:56
9.	"If I Can't Have You"	Smeplass; Maria Hazell; J. Hazell; Halldin	2:15
10.	"Leave It Beautiful"	Smeplass; Emily Warren; J. Hazell; Halldin; Ludvig Soderberg	3:04
Total length:			28:30

Leave It Beautiful (Complete)
No.	Title	Writer(s)	Length
1.	"Leave It Beautiful"	Smeplass; Warren; J. Hazell; Halldin; Soderberg	3:04
2.	"Marilyn Monroe"	Smeplass; Mirzazadeh; Ball; Eichen; J. Hazell; Halldin	2:54
3.	"Can't Forget"	Smeplass; Norton; J. Hazell; Halldin	2:53
4.	"Hits Different"	Smeplass; Scola; J. Hazell; Halldin	2:38
5.	"It's Okay If You Forget Me"	Smeplass; Pennell; J. Hazell; Halldin	3:24
6.	"Dance Dance Dance"	Smeplass; Nilsson; J. Hazell; Halldin	2:39
7.	"Airpods"	Smeplass; Wadge; J. Hazell; Halldin	2:12
8.	"Good Choices"	Smeplass; Furoyen; H. Flint; G. Flint	3:35
9.	"Obsessed"	Smeplass; J. Hazell; Halldin	2:56
10.	"If I Can't Have You"	Smeplass; M. Hazell; J. Hazell; Halldin	2:15
11.	"I Do" (with Brett Young)	Scola; Halldin; Julia Karisson	2:36
12.	"Emotion"	Ali Payami; Smeplass; Jakob Jerlstorm	3:11
13.	"Hurts So Good"	Lindy Robbins; Julia Michaels; Tom Meredith; Marco Borreno	3:29
14.	"Think Before I Talk"	Andrew Cedar; Madison Love; Scott Harris	3:05
15.	"Dance Dance Dance" (acoustic)	Smeplass; Nilsson; Hazell; Halldin	3:02
16.	"I Don't Know Why" (with NOTD)	Samuel Brandt; Tobias Danielsson; Jason Gill; Pennell	3:28
Total length:			47:21

== Personnel ==
Musicians

- Astrid Smeplass – vocals, background vocals (all tracks), piano (7)
- Eyelar Mirzazadeh – background vocals (1)
- Fred Ball – bass programming, drums, guitar, keyboards, percussion, programming (1)
- Svante Halldin – programming (all tracks), bass programming, drums, guitar, keyboards, percussion (1–4, 6–10); trumpet (9)
- Jakob Hazell – programming (all tracks), bass programming, drums, guitar, keyboards, percussion (1–4, 6–10); trumpet (9)
- Peter Axelsson – strings (6)
- Ludvig Soderberg – background vocals, bass programming, drums, keyboards, percussion, programming (10)

Technical

- Sören von Malmborg – mastering (all tracks), mixing (1–5, 7–10)
- Andreas Roos – mixing (6)
- Jack & Coke – recording (1–6, 8–10), executive production
- Anders Kjær – recording (7)

== Charts ==
Chart performance for Leave It Beautiful
Chart (2020)	Peak position
Norwegian Albums (VG-lista)	2
