= BlimE! =

Norwegian children's friendship campaign

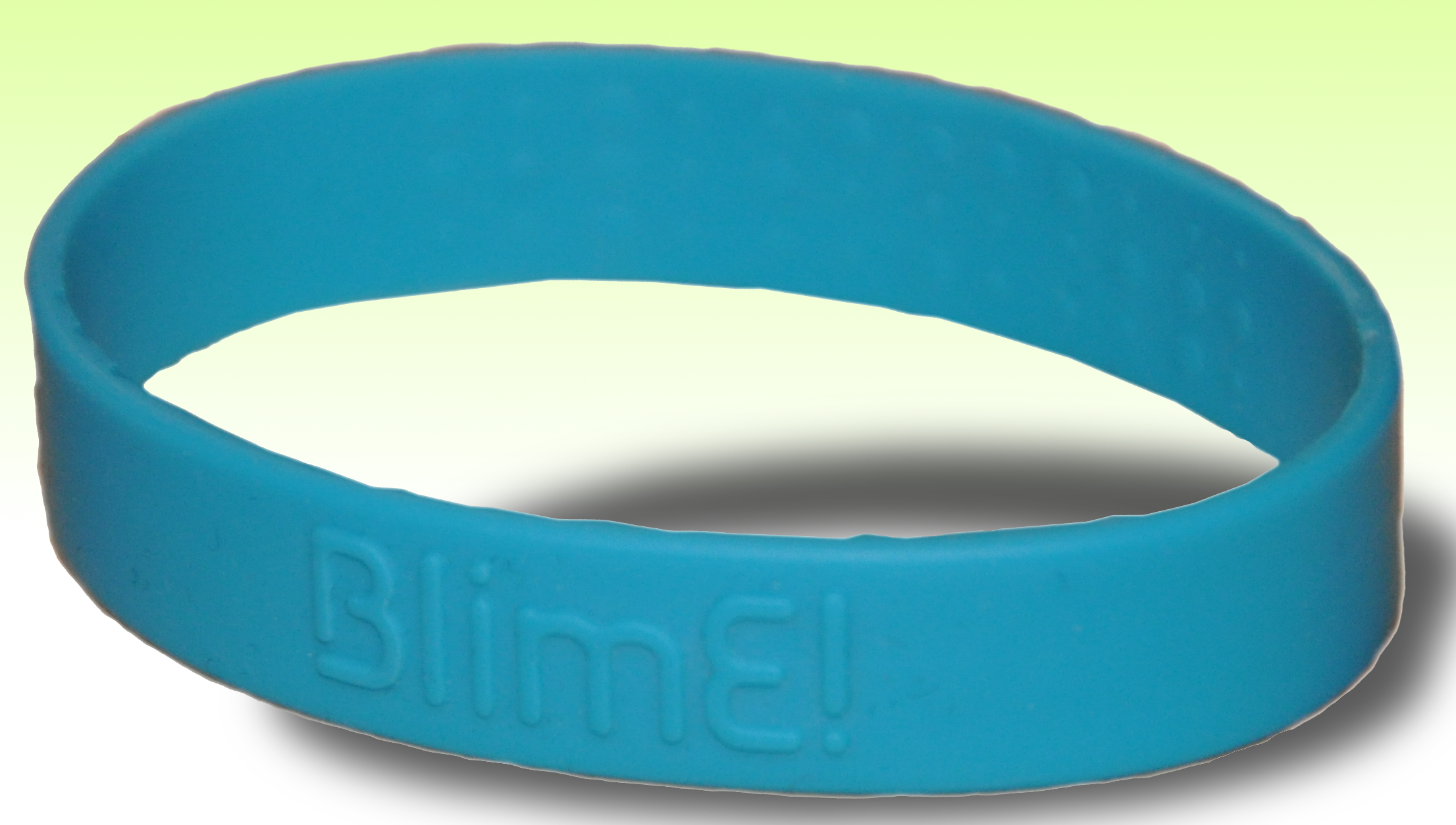
BlimE! bracelet

BlimE! (Stylization of "bli med!", Norwegian for "join in!") is a friendship campaign hosted by the Norwegian Broadcasting Corporation with the slogan "Say hello! Be a friend! Join in". The primary purpose is to inspire children to see each other, care for each other and include each other.

The campaign consists of a song and a corresponding dance that is performed simultaneously by approximately 400,000 children every year. Although the actual effect of the campaign is debated, it is generally agreed that it does support a sense of community by providing common experiences among children.

In 2018, BlimE Day was Friday 21 September. The song was "BlimE" by Freddy Kalas. The following year, BlimE day was Friday 6 September, with the song "Mer enn god nok" by Stina Talling. The army participated with a dance video of its own that received a lot of attention on the internet and in the media and the 2019 edition was named the editorial event of the year during the media awards 2019 under the auspices of the Media Companies National Association.

It was introduced in 2010, and has since then been an annual event. In 2020, It was extended to an international event named #SayHi, hosted by broadcasters from 13 different countries.

In 2021, the campaign was supplemented with cross-disciplinary learning resources for primary schools focusing on ethical dilemmas and social competences.
