= Old Thing Back =

Single by Matoma and The Notorious B.I.G. featuring Ja Rule and Ralph Tresvant

from the album Hakuna Matoma
- Released: 24 February 2015
- Recorded: 2014
- Genre: Tropical house; hip hop; pop rap
- Length: 5:22; 6:19 (Club Edit)
- Label: Warner Music Group
- Songwriter(s): Tom Stræte Lagergren; Christopher Wallace; Ralph Tresvant; Jeffrey Atkins; Jack Knight
- Producer(s): Matoma

Matoma singles chronology
| "Old Thing Back" (2015) | "Try Me" (2015) |

The Notorious B.I.G. singles chronology
| "Spit Your Game" (2006) | "Old Thing Back" (2015) | "Party On the West Coast" (2017) |

Ja Rule singles chronology
| "She Tried (Remix)" (2013) | "Old Thing Back" (2015) | "Blow" (2021) |

Ralph Tresvant singles chronology
| "It Must Be You" (2009) | "Old Thing Back" (2015) |

"Old Thing Back" is a 2015 single by Norwegian DJ Matoma that is a club remix of the 2007 song "Want That Old Thing Back" by The Notorious B.I.G. featuring Ja Rule and Ralph Tresvant. "Want That Old Thing Back" appeared on the compilation album Greatest Hits, and is a remix of the 1995 Notorious B.I.G. single "One More Chance". "Old Thing Back" is credited to "Matoma and The Notorious B.I.G. featuring Ja Rule & Ralph Tresvant", making this Matoma's debut single as a main artist.

Both "Want That Old Thing Back" and "Old Thing Back" were produced after The Notorious B.I.G.'s death in 1997.

== Rise to popularity and release ==
The remix initially became popular in the summer of 2014 when it reached #1 on the music aggregator website Hype Machine. Many record companies expressed interest in Matoma's work after hearing the remix. Ja Rule, who is featured on the original track, wrote on Twitter that he loved the track.

The track was officially released in March 2015, on Big Beat Records. It charted on VG-lista, the official Norwegian singles chart and Sverigetopplistan, the official Swedish singles chart.

An instrumental version of the remix is featured in the 2014 snowboarding film Shredbots The Movie directed by Leo Cittadella.

== Charts ==
=== Weekly charts ===
| Chart (2015) | Peak position |
|---|---|
| Denmark (Tracklisten) | 18 |
| Finland (Suomen virallinen lista) | 12 |
| Ireland (IRMA) | 43 |
| Netherlands (Single Top 100) | 75 |
| Norway (VG-lista) | 2 |
| New Zealand (Recorded Music NZ) | 25 |
| Sweden (Sverigetopplistan) | 8 |
| US Bubbling Under R&B/Hip-Hop Singles (Billboard) | 8 |
| US Hot Dance/Electronic Songs (Billboard) | 25 |

=== Year-end charts ===
| Chart (2015) | Position |
|---|---|
| Sweden (Sverigetopplistan) | 37 |
| US Hot Dance/Electronic Songs (Billboard) | 75 |

== Certifications ==
| Region | Certification | Certified units/sales |
|---|---|---|
| Canada (Music Canada) | Gold | 40,000^{*} |
| Denmark (IFPI Danmark) | Platinum | 60,000^{^} |
| Italy (FIMI) | Gold | 25,000^{‡} |
| New Zealand (RMNZ) | 3× Platinum | 90,000^{‡} |
| Norway (IFPI Norway) | Platinum | 40,000^{‡} |
| Sweden (GLF) | Platinum | 40,000^{‡} |
| United Kingdom (BPI) | Gold | 400,000^{‡} |
| United States (RIAA) | Platinum | 1,000,000^{‡} |
^{*} Sales figures based on certification alone.^{^} Shipments figures based on certification alone.^{‡} Sales+streaming figures based on certification alone.
