= Think Before I Talk =

Single by Astrid S

from the album Leave It Beautiful (Complete)
- Released: 25 August 2017
- Length: 3:04
- Label: Island
- Songwriter(s): Andrew Cedar; Madison Love; Scott Harris
- Producer(s): Andrew Cedar; Earwulf

Astrid S singles chronology
"Such a Boy" (2017)	"Think Before I Talk" (2017)	"Boys" (2017)

"Think Before I Talk" is a song by Norwegian singer Astrid S, released on 25 August 2017 through Island Records and Universal Music. It was written by Andrew Cedar, Madison Love and Scott Harris. It reached number one in Norway, as well as the top 10 in Denmark and the top 20 in Sweden. The song was later included on the complete edition of her debut studio album Leave It Beautiful.

== Background ==
Astrid S explained that the song is about "saying things you don't mean because you are hurt, frustrated or maybe angry" and the "ensuing regret".

== Critical reception ==
Robin Murray of Clash said the song expresses regret "in the sweetest way possible" and is "superbly uplifting, with the vocal veering between two poles of indignation and soft resignation".

== Charts ==
Chart (2017–18)	Peak position
Belgium (Ultratip Bubbling Under Flanders)	14
Denmark (Tracklisten)	9
Norway (VG-lista)	1
Sweden (Sverigetopplistan)	20
US Dance Club Songs (Billboard)	10

== Certifications ==
Region	Certification	Certified units/sales
Denmark (IFPI Danmark)	2× Platinum	180,000^{‡}
Norway (IFPI Norway)	5× Platinum	300,000^{‡}
Sweden (GLF)	Platinum	40,000^{‡}
^{‡} Sales+streaming figures based on certification alone.
