= One in a Million (Matoma album) =

Studio album by Matoma
- Released: 24 August 2018
- Genre: Dance-pop
- Length: 49:58
- Labels: Parlophone; Warner Music Group
- Producers: Matoma; TMS; Alma; Jurek; Loose Change; PhD; Cutfather; MNEK; Lauren D-Eila; XSDTRK; The Six; Digital Farm Animals; Jayson DeZuzio; Jenna Andrews; Marco "MAG" Borerro; Scott Robinson; Danny Majic; DJ Frank E; Rob Whitaker; Axident; Sebastian Daniel

Matoma chronology
Hakuna Matoma (2016)	One in a Million (2018)	RYTME (2020)

Singles from One in a Million
- 1. "Slow" Released: 17 November 2017; 2. "Lonely" Released: 23 March 2018; 3. "I Don't Dance (Without You)" Released: 27 July 2018; 4. "Sunday Morning" Released: 9 November 2018

One in a Million is the second studio album by Norwegian DJ and record producer Matoma. It was released on 24 August 2018 via Parlophone and Warner Music Group. It was preceded by three singles: "Slow" (featuring Noah Cyrus), "Lonely" (featuring Max) and "I Don't Dance (Without You)" (a collaboration with Enrique Iglesias and featuring Konshens). It also includes the 2016 singles "False Alarm", a collaboration with British singer Becky Hill that was previously included on Matoma's debut album Hakuna Matoma, and "All Night", a collaboration with British boy band The Vamps that was included on the "Night Edition" of their 2017 album Night & Day.

One in a Million debuted at number 12 in Norway and 17 on the US Dance/Electronic Albums chart.

== Music ==
The album includes 15 songs broadly categorised as dance-pop with a tropical influence. Billboard magazine mentioned its potential crossover pop appeal due to its "stirringly emotional moments and dance floor feelings". Earmilk also noted the album's Latin influence due to collaborations with Enrique Iglesias and Yashua. Dancing Astronaut called attention to Matoma's "sun drenched style" on the album and its changes in tempo, with "Slow" being "tamer" while tracks like "Sunday Morning" are "high energy".

In a track-by-track rundown of the album, Matoma explained that he decided to include "False Alarm" again because "the story behind the song and how much it has meant to me deserves a place on this album".

== Track listing ==
One in a Million track listing
No.	Title	Writer(s)	Producer(s)	Length
1.	"One in a Million"	Thomas Lagergren; Thomas Barnes; Peter Kelleher; Benjamin Kohn; Sverre Indris Joner; Samuel Romans	Matoma; TMS	3:50
2.	"I Don't Dance (Without You)" (with Enrique Iglesias featuring Konshens)	Lagergren; Enrique Preysler; Garfield Spence; Simon Wilcox; John Mitchell	Matoma	2:57
3.	"Sunday Morning" (featuring Josie Dunne)	Lagergren; Joseph Kirkland; Jason Dean; Alma-Sofia Miettinen; Jurek Reunamaki	Matoma; Alma; Jurek^{[a]}	3:05
4.	"Lights Go Down" (featuring James Newman)	Lagergren; James Newman; Patrick Patrikios; Hanni Ibrahim; Matthew Simons; Tushar Apte	Matoma; Loose Change^{[a]}	3:37
5.	"False Alarm" (with Becky Hill)	Lagergren; Rebecca Hill; Peter Wallevik; Daniel Heløy Davidsen; Kara DioGuardi; Newman; Mich Hansen	Matoma; PhD; Cutfather; MNEK	3:44
6.	"Don't Say What You Want To" (featuring Yashua)	Lagergren; Yashua Camacho; Jason Boyd; Sophia D'Antonio; Shaylen Carroll	Matoma; Lauren D'Eila^{[c]}	3:28
7.	"Losing It Over You" (featuring Ayme)	Lagergren; Amy Allen; Sean Kennedy	Matoma; XSDTRK^{[b]}	3:27
8.	"Lonely" (featuring Max)	T. Lagergren; Maxwell Schneider; Richard Boardman; Pablo Bowman; Daniel Boyle; Sarah Blanchard; Cleo Tighe; Nicholas Gale; Eden Anderson; Naomi Miller	Matoma; The Six; Digital Farm Animals	2:47
9.	"Telepatía" (featuring Luis Figueroa)	Lagergren; Luis Figueroa; Yoel Henriquez	Matoma	3:10
10.	"Slow" (featuring Noah Cyrus)	Lagergren; Sabrina Bernstein; Danny Tenenbaum; Jayson DeZuzio; Marco "Mag" Borrero	Matoma; DeZuzio; Jenna Andrews; MAG; Scott Robinson	3:20
11.	"All Night" (with The Vamps)	Bradley Simpson; James McVey; Connor Ball; Tristan Evans; Justin Franks; Daniel Majic; Mitchell	Matoma; Danny Majic; DJ Frank E	3:17
12.	"Pieces" (featuring Noah Kahan)	Lagergren; Noah Kahan; Todrick Clark	Matoma; Rob Whitaker	2:50
13.	"Lost at Sea"	Lagergren; Andreas Schuller; Ingrid Andress; Michael Pollack	Matoma; Axident	3:07
14.	"Heartbeats" (featuring Nina Nesbitt)	Lagergren; Nina Nesbitt; Sebastian Daniel; Samuel Preston	Matoma; Daniel	4:00
15.	"Not Coming Home" (featuring JRM)	Lagergren; Jaramaye Daniels; George Taylor; Jeremy Dussolliet; Timothy Sommers; Jeremy Felton; Morten Jansen	Matoma	3:19
Total length:				49:58

== Charts ==
Chart performance for One in a Million
Chart (2018)	Peak position
Norwegian Albums (VG-lista)	12
US Top Dance Albums (Billboard)	17
