= Hurts So Good (Astrid S song) =

Single by Astrid S

from the EP Astrid S and the album Leave It Beautiful (Complete)
- Released: 6 May 2016
- Genre: Pop
- Length: 3:28
- Label: Island
- Songwriters: Lindy Robbins; Julia Michaels; Tom Meredith; Marco Borrero
- Producers: MAG; Pär Westerlund; Tom Meredith

Astrid S singles chronology
"Paper Thin" (2016)	"Hurts So Good" (2016)	"Breathe" (2017)

Music video
- "Hurts So Good" on YouTube

"Hurts So Good" is a song by Norwegian singer Astrid S, released as the second single from her self-titled debut EP. The song was written by Lindy Robbins, Julia Michaels, Tom Meredith, and Marco Borrero. It was released on 6 May 2016. Although it received moderate success as a radio single, it later became a viral sleeper hit in 2021, after gaining popularity on the social media platform TikTok. In response to this newfound popularity, the song was re-released in 2021 on the complete edition of her debut studio album Leave It Beautiful. In March 2021, a collaboration version of the song was released, which featured Danish artist Maximillian and music producer Kina. As of June 2021, it remains her most streamed song on Spotify, garnering over 500 million listens.

== Background and release ==
The song was initially released on 6 May 2016 as the second single from her self-titled debut EP, and again later that month as a part of the official soundtrack album for MTV's Scream Season 2, appearing throughout the season, and re-released with Scream: Music from Season Two on July 29, 2016, under Island Records.

== Composition ==
"Hurts So Good" was written by Lindy Robbins, Julia Michaels, Tom Meredith, and Marco Borrero. It was composed in the key of G minor, with a tempo of 120 beats per minute. Astrid S described the song as "this torn feeling of not being with the person you want to be with, but you really want to."

== Music video ==
The music video was directed by Andreas Öhman and filmed in Sweden, with snippets of panoramic shots from Norway.

== Charts ==
Chart (2016)	Peak position
Belgium (Ultratip Bubbling Under Flanders)	41
Belgium (Ultratip Bubbling Under Wallonia)	42
Czech Republic (Singles Digitál Top 100)	55
New Zealand (Recorded Music NZ)	18
Norway (VG-lista)	6
Slovakia (Singles Digitál Top 100)	55
Sweden (Sverigetopplistan)	41
UK Singles (Official Charts Company)	176

== Certifications ==
Region	Certification	Certified units/sales
Brazil (Pro-Música Brasil)	Gold	30,000^{‡}
Denmark (IFPI Danmark)	Platinum	90,000^{‡}
Italy (FIMI)	Gold	25,000^{‡}
New Zealand (RMNZ)	2× Platinum	60,000^{‡}
Norway (IFPI Norway)	3× Platinum	120,000^{‡}
Poland (ZPAV)	Gold	25,000^{‡}
Sweden (GLF)	2× Platinum	80,000^{‡}
United Kingdom (BPI)	Silver	200,000^{‡}
United States (RIAA)	Gold	500,000^{‡}
^{‡} Sales+streaming figures based on certification alone.
