= Astrid S =

Norwegian singer (born 1996)

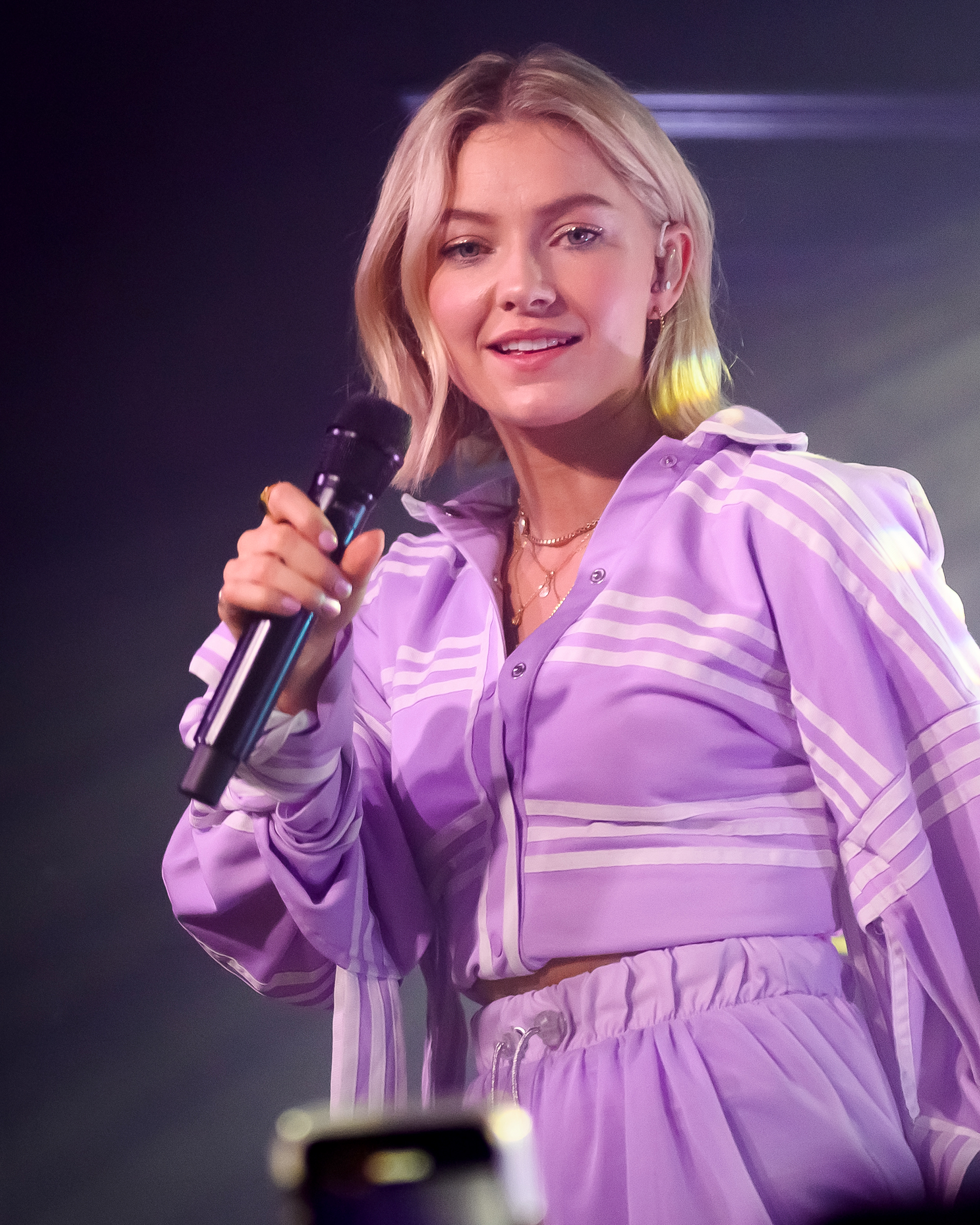
- Astrid S performing at the Moroccan Lounge in Los Angeles, February 2019

Background information
- Also known as: Astrid
- Born: Astrid Smeplass; 29 October 1996 (age 29); Rennebu Municipality, Norway
- Genres: Pop; alternative pop; electropop
- Occupations: Singer; songwriter
- Instruments: Vocals; guitar; piano
- Works: Discography
- Years active: 2013–present
- Labels: Island; Universal; Joyride
- Website: astridsofficial.com

Astrid Smeplass (born 29 October 1996), known professionally as Astrid S, is a Norwegian singer and songwriter. In 2013, she placed fifth in the Norwegian version of Pop Idol, entitled Idol – Jakten på en superstjerne. In 2020, she released her debut studio album, Leave It Beautiful, through Universal.

== Early life ==
Growing up in Berkåk, a tiny village in Rennebu Municipality, Smeplass played piano at home and flute in her school's marching band. However, she felt classical music was too confining, so she learned guitar and began writing her own songs, inspired by her main influence, John Mayer. At age 13, she learned to speak English.

== Career ==
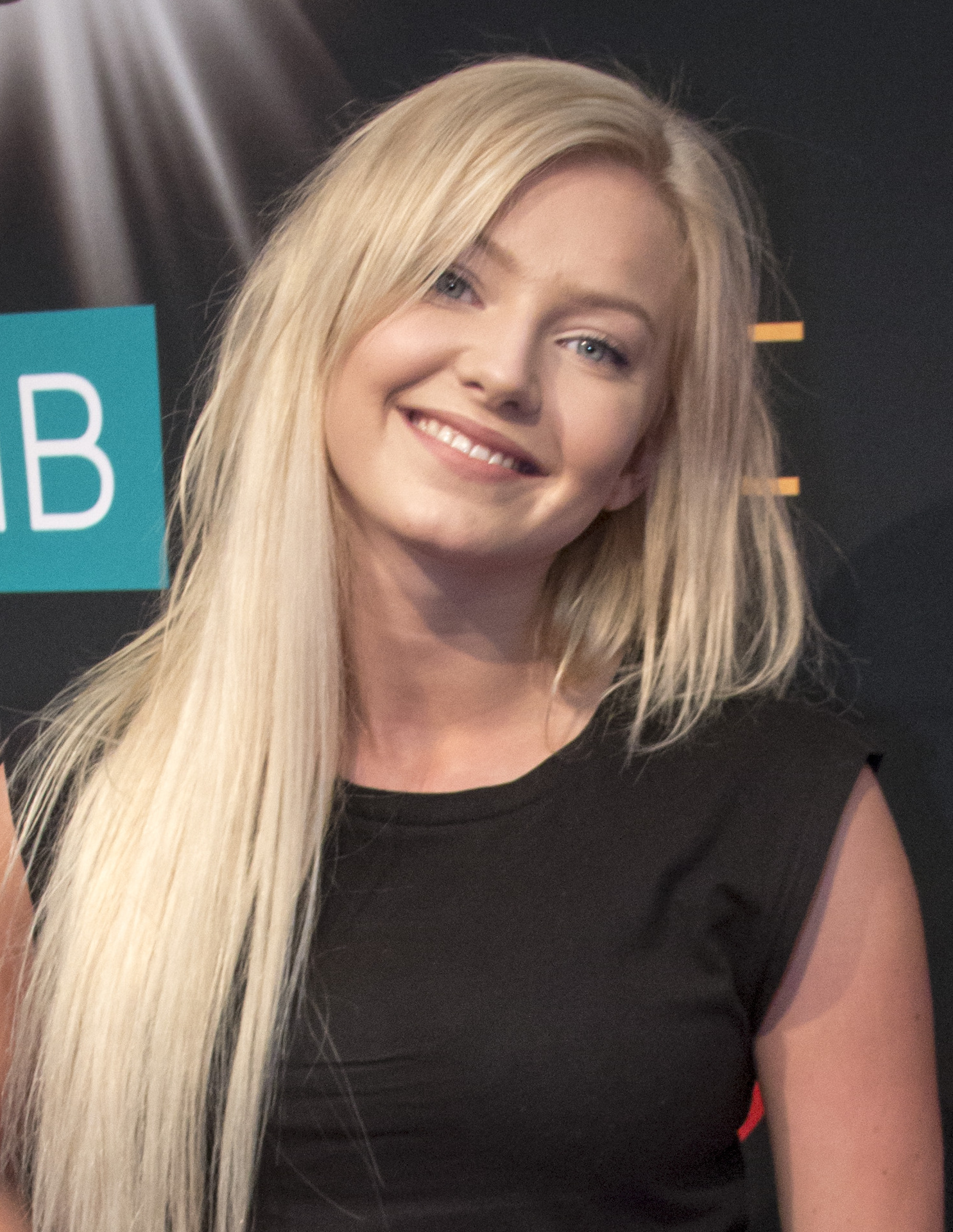
Smeplass walking the red carpet at VG-Lista 2014 held at Rådhusplassen in Oslo

Smeplass released her first single "Shattered", which was co-written by American singer-songwriter Melanie Fontana, after participating in Idol - Jakten på en superstjerne in 2013; she was 16. She signed a publishing deal with Sony ATV Music Publishing shortly afterwards. Her first single with her new artist image, "2AM", was released through Universal Music in 2014, releasing in the U.S. in 2015.

She also released a cover of the single "FourFiveSeconds" by Rihanna, Kanye West, and Paul McCartney. In 2016, she released the song "Hurts So Good", which was included on her debut self-titled extended play, Astrid S. She supported Troye Sivan on his European tour. In 2017, she released her second EP, Party's Over. Also in 2017, she provided backing vocals on "Hey Hey Hey" by Katy Perry from her album Witness.

In 2017, Smeplass' cover of Cezinando's "Vi er perfekt, men verden er ikke det" was featured on the soundtrack of the fourth season of Skam and Smeplass performed it at the award ceremony P3 Gull the same year. On 30 June 2017, she released her second EP, Party's Over, which featured the singles "Breathe" and "Such a Boy". Two weeks later, an acoustic rendition of the EP was released, with an additional song entitled "Mexico". In September 2017, her single "Think Before I Talk" peaked at No. 14 on the Swedish charts, where it was later certified platinum. It was also certified gold in Denmark, where it peaked at No. 9. In February 2018, Smeplass was awarded Spellemann of the Year at the annual Spellemannprisen, being the first female artist to do so since 2003. After the release of the song "Emotion", she joined Years & Years on their UK tour at the end of 2018, followed by her supporting Zara Larsson on Larsson's U.S. tour in 2019. In April 2019, Astrid became the face of Fendi's F for Fendi campaign. She joined 16-year-old climate change activist Greta Thunberg for her Fridays For Future event in Sweden, performing a cover of "I Want to Know What Love Is" by Foreigner.

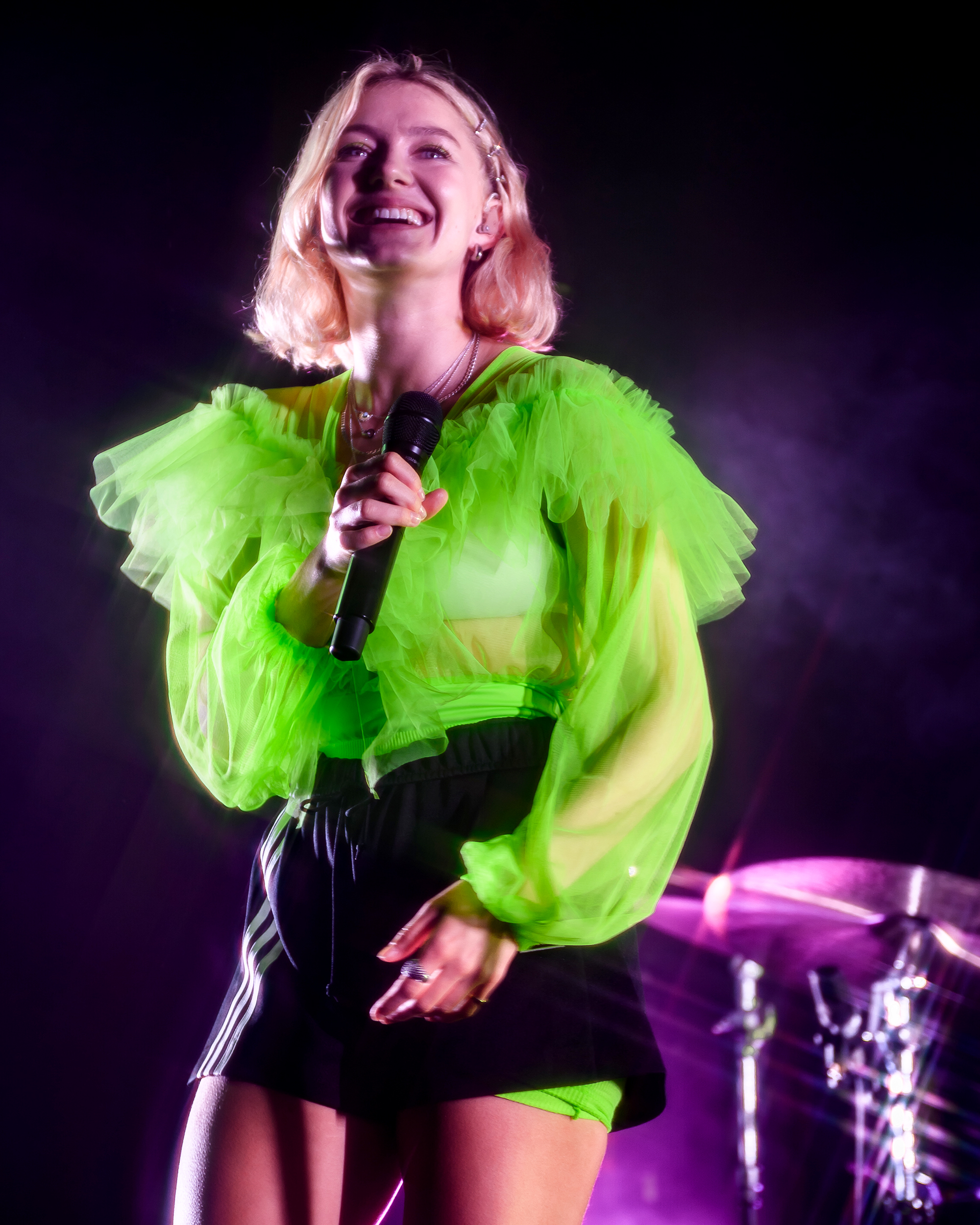
Smeplass performing at The Observatory OC in Santa Ana, California, May 2019

In August 2019, her fourth EP was released, entitled Trust Issues. The EP features previously released singles "Someone New", "Emotion" and "The First One", in addition to two new released; "Doing To Me" and "Trust Issues". Smeplass' first release of 2020 was "I Do", a collaboration with country singer Brett Young which peaked at No. 3 in Norway. In September 2020, Smeplass announced her debut studio album, Leave It Beautiful, which came out on 16 October 2020. It was preceded by the lead single "Dance Dance Dance", as well as the second and third singles, "Marilyn Monroe" and "It's Ok If You Forget Me".

In 2021, similarities were noted in the lyrics of the French Montana track "How You King?" with the Astrid S song "Jump". Astrid S retroactively got proper attribution as a co-songwriter and received compensation for the song. Also in 2021, she played Askepott (Cinderella) in Tre nøtter til Askepott, a Norwegian remake of the 1973 Czechoslovak/East German film Tři oříšky pro Popelku (Three Wishes for Cinderella, for which she also released the single "Når Snøen Smelter", her first original song in Norwegian.

In 2025, Smeplass split with Universal Music after the end of her original contract and releases music independently under her own record label, Joyride, and through a distribution deal with the Gladstone Music Group. The news preceded her appearance on the 15th series of the TV show Hver gang vi møtes (Every Time we Meet) which challenges artists to produce new interpretations of songs by other artists. Her cover of Carola's "Det regnar i Stockholm"-made into a Norwegian version "Det regner i Oslo" - became her third No. 1 on the Norwegian singles chart. Her other performances from the show charted well with a further No. 1, two top 10s's, and positions in the top 40 for all of the other releases, culminating in an EP of the interpretations Hver Gang Vi Møtes 2025 charting at No. 2 on the Norwegian albums chart. On 2 July 2025, she sang Norway's national anthem ahead of the Women's Euros football match between Switzerland and Norway.

== Personal life ==
Smeplass dated model Per Christian Wessel from 2017 to 2020. As of 2017, she lives in Oslo, Norway.

== Discography ==
- Leave It Beautiful (2020)
- Joyride (2024)

== Filmography ==
Television

| Year | Title | Role | Note | Ref. |
|---|---|---|---|---|
| 2016 | Skam | House party attender | 1 episode; guest appearance | |
| 2018 | Astrid S tilbake fra verden | Herself | 5 episodes | |

Movies

| Year | Title | Role | Note | Ref. |
|---|---|---|---|---|
| 2021 | Three Wishes for Cinderella | Cinderella | | |

== Concert tours ==
Headlining

- Party's Over World Tour (2017)
- World Tour Part_One (2020)

Supporting

- Troye Sivan – Blue Neighbourhood Tour (2016)
- Troye Sivan – Suburbia Tour (2016)
- Years & Years – Palo Santo Tour (2018)
- Zara Larsson – Don't Worry Bout Me Tour (2019)

== Awards and nominations ==
| Year | Organization | Award | Work | Result | Ref. |
|---|---|---|---|---|---|
| 2015 | MTV Europe Music Awards 2015 | Best Norwegian Act | Astrid S | Won | |
| 2015 | P3 Gull 2015 | Newcomer of the Year | Astrid S | Won | |
| 2015 | P3 Gull 2015 | Song of the Year | "2AM" | Won | |
| 2016 | Berlin Music Video Awards | Best Song | "Hyde" | Nominated | —N/a |
| 2016 | MTV Europe Music Awards 2016 | Best Norwegian Act | Astrid S | Nominated | |
| 2017 | Spellemannprisen 2016 | Newcomer of the Year & Gramo Scholarship | Astrid S | Won | |
| 2017 | Spellemannprisen 2016 | Song of the Year | "Hurts So Good" | Nominated | |
| 2017 | MTV Europe Music Awards 2017 | Best Norwegian Act | Astrid S | Nominated | |
| 2018 | Spellemannprisen 2017 | Spellemann of the Year (Note: No nominees were announced for this award.) | Astrid S | Won | |
| 2018 | Spellemannprisen 2017 | Song of the Year | "Think Before I Talk" | Nominated | |
| 2018 | GAFFA Awards 2018 (Sweden) | Best Foreign New Act | Astrid S | Won | |
| 2018 | MTV Europe Music Awards 2018 | Best Norwegian Act | Astrid S | Nominated | |
| 2019 | Spellemannprisen 2018 | Song of the Year | "Emotion" | Nominated | |
| 2019 | GAFFA Awards 2019 (Sweden) | Best Foreign Solo Act | Astrid S | Nominated | |
| 2019 | MTV Europe Music Awards 2019 | Best Norwegian Act | Astrid S | Nominated | |
| 2019 | Berlin Music Video Awards | Best Cinematography | "Emotion" | Nominated | |
| 2020 | P3 Gull 2020 | Artist of the Year | Astrid S | Nominated | |
| 2022 | P3 Gull 2022 | Song of the Year | "Pretty" (with Dagny) | Nominated | |
