= Matoma =

Norwegian DJ (born 1991)

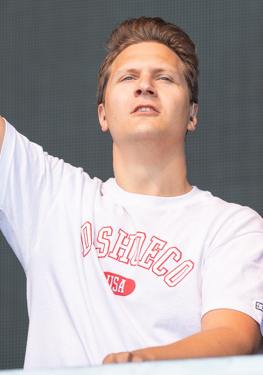
- Matoma at Stavernfestivalen in 2019

Background information
- Born: Tom Stræte Lagergren; 29 May 1991 (age 35); Åsnes, Norway
- Genres: EDM; R&B; pop; dancehall; house; tropical house
- Occupations: Disc jockey; record producer
- Instruments: Digital audio workstation; piano; flute; guitar
- Years active: 2014–present
- Label: Warner
- Website: hakunamatoma.com

Tom Stræte Lagergren (born 29 May 1991), known professionally as Matoma, is a Norwegian DJ and record producer.

== Early life ==
Lagergren was born in Åsnes Municipality, Norway. He started playing the piano as a child. During that period, he won a contest to perform alongside Norwegian pianists Håvard Gimse and Leif Ove Andsnes. As he grew tired of classical piano, Lagergren began mixing on his computer. He holds a bachelor's degree in Music Technology from the Norwegian University of Science and Technology.

== Career ==
"Free Fallin Tropical Mojito Remix (John Mayer Tribute)" was produced with fellow tropical house producer Nelsaan and was released on Matoma's 23rd birthday.

Matoma was asked by Universal Germany to make a remix of Marlon Roudette's "When the Beat Drops" in July 2014 which was released one month later.

His remix of "Old Thing Back" by The Notorious B.I.G. became popular when it charted in Norway, peaking at number two on VG-lista, the official Norwegian singles chart. It also charted highly in Sweden, Finland, Denmark and New Zealand. It reached number 1 on the music blog aggregator Hype Machine with many record companies including Big Beat Records expressing interest in Matoma's work after hearing the remix. Ja Rule, who is featured on the original track, also tweeted that he loved the track. He also remixed the song "Bailando" at the request of Enrique Iglesias' team.

After musician Hedegaard released his single "Happy Home", he and Matoma had a consultation about a remix of it. This was officially released by Copenhagen Records in September 2014. In October, Matoma's remix of Eminem's "Business" was released. During this month, Warner Music Norway published another remix, the Nelsaan & Matoma Remix of Marit Larsen's "I Don't Want to Talk About It". It is the second remix of Nelsaan and Matoma.

In January 2015, Matoma released a remix of MYNGA featuring Cosmo Klein's "Back Home". In total, Matoma has published more than 136 tracks on his own SoundCloud page.

On 24 June 2016, Matoma, along with singer Becky Hill, released his hit single False Alarm. On 15 October 2016, he collaborated with British boy band, The Vamps to release the single "All Night". An official music video was published by The Vamps. As of February 2019 the single had received 375 million Spotify streams. Matoma and The Vamps' second collaborative single "Staying Up" was released on 1 September 2017.

In 2020 he released his new single "WOW" with singer Emma Steinbakken. In the same year he released a Christmas song titled 'It's Christmas Time' with singer Michael Bolton.

From 2021 to 2022, Matoma served as a coach on the Norwegian version of The Voice. He mentored country singer Erlend Gunstveit to victory in the sixth season, who won the competition on 28 May 2021.

In September 2021, it was announced that Matoma co-founded the AI music tech startup Masterchannel, together with Simon Hestermann and Christian Ringstad Schultz. The startup has developed a novel Artificial Intelligence approach to automated music mastering and was awarded 'Norway's Best Creative Tech Startup' in 2022.

== Equipment ==
Matoma uses Cubase 8 Pro to produce music and Massive, a Digital audio workstation plugin to program his synth sounds. He also uses piano, guitars and flutes.

== Discography ==
- Hakuna Matoma (2016)
- One in a Million (2018)

== Awards and nominations ==
Year	Organization	Award	Work	Result
2017	Spellemannprisen '16	Årets Nykommer & Gramostipend (Newcomer of the Year & Gramo scholarship)	Matoma	Nominated
2017	Spellemannprisen '16	Årets Låt (Song of the Year)	"False Alarm"	Nominated
