= LMFAO discography =

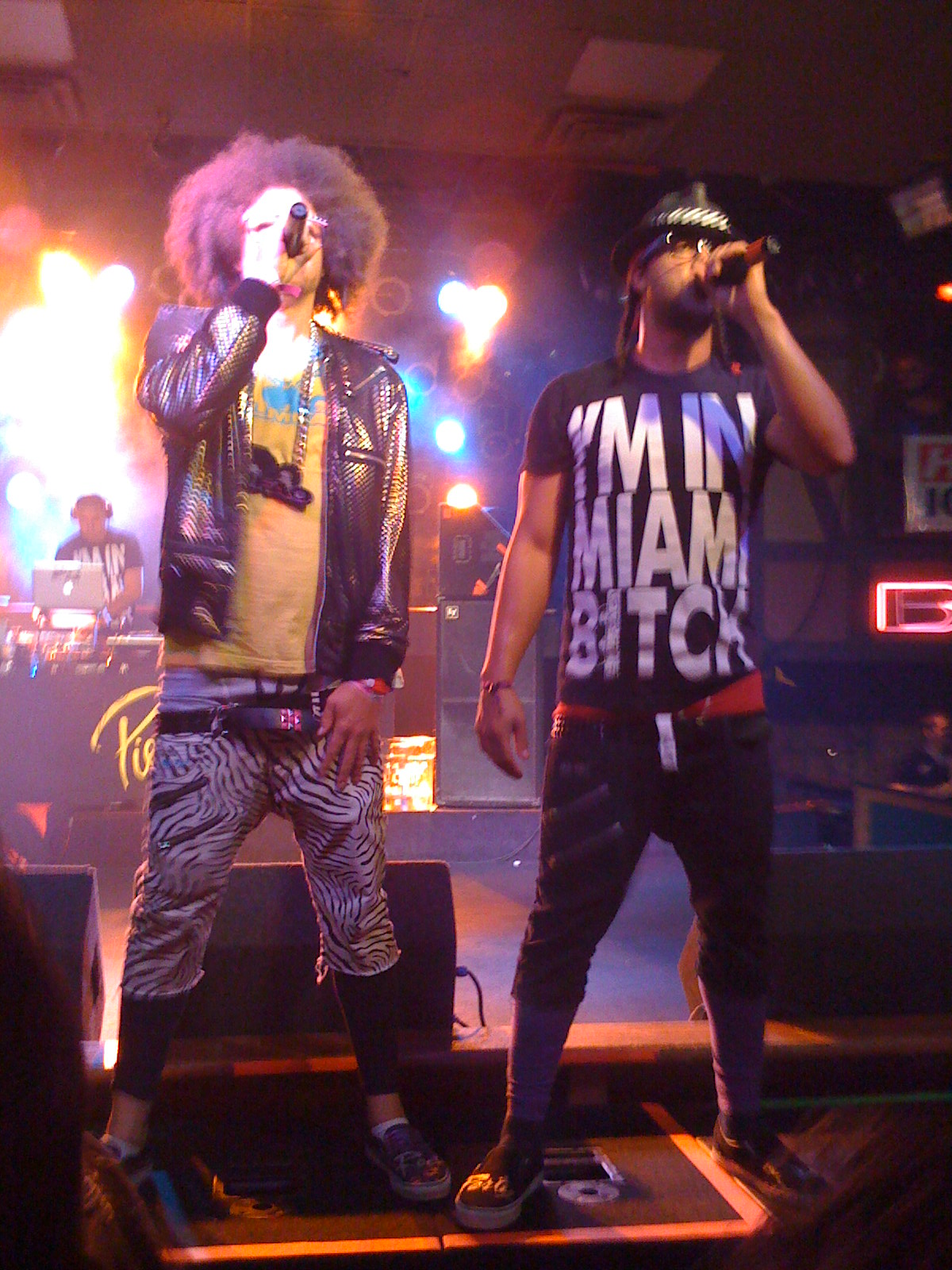
- LMFAO performing in Fort Wayne, Indiana
- Studio albums: 2
- Extended plays: 1
- Singles: 16
- Music videos: 15

The discography of American electro and hip hop duo LMFAO consists of two studio albums, one extended play, sixteen singles and fifteen music videos. Consisting of rappers and singers Redfoo and SkyBlu, the duo was formed in 2006 in the Los Angeles neighborhood of Pacific Palisades. LMFAO began their career in the Los Angeles club circuit, where they were met with positive reception. American hip hop recording artist will.i.am brought the duo to the attention of industry executive Jimmy Iovine, who signed them to his label Interscope Records.

In July 2008, LMFAO released their sole extended play (EP) Party Rock. The following year, their debut studio album of the same name was released; it peaked at number 33 on the US Billboard 200. The album's first single, "I'm in Miami Bitch", peaked at number 51 on the US Billboard Hot 100; the single was more commercially successful in Australia and Canada, becoming a top 40 hit in both countries. "La La La" and "Shots", the album's second and third singles, peaked at numbers 55 and 68 respectively on the Hot 100. The latter single was certified two times platinum by the Recording Industry Association of America (RIAA). The album's fourth single, "Yes", peaked at number 68 in Canada. In 2009, a mashup of "I'm in Miami Bitch" and Dutch DJ Chuckie's 2008 single "Let the Bass Kick" was released, entitled "Let the Bass Kick in Miami Bitch". The single performed well in Europe, becoming a top-ten hit in the United Kingdom.

In 2010, the duo were featured on the song "Gettin' Over You" by French house producer David Guetta. The song became an international hit, topping the charts in France and the United Kingdom as well as reaching the top ten in multiple other countries, including Australia, Ireland and New Zealand. LMFAO released their second studio album Sorry for Party Rocking in June 2011; "Party Rock Anthem" was released as the album's lead single. The song topped the Billboard Hot 100 and also hit number one in countries such as Australia, Canada and the United Kingdom. Fueled by the success of "Party Rock Anthem", Sorry for Party Rocking peaked at number five on the Billboard 200 and earned a gold certification from the RIAA. "Champagne Showers", the album's second single, became a top-ten hit in Australia and New Zealand. "Sexy and I Know It", the album's third single, became LMFAO's second number-one hit on the Billboard Hot 100; it also topped the charts in Australia and Canada. The album's fourth single, "Sorry for Party Rocking", peaked at number 49 on the Billboard Hot 100.

== Albums ==
=== Studio albums ===
List of studio albums, with selected chart positions, sales figures and certifications
Title	Details	Peak chart positions										Sales	Certifications
Title	Details	US	AUS	AUT	CAN	FRA	GER	IRL	NZ	SWI	UK	Sales	Certifications
Party Rock	Released: July 7, 2009; Label: will.i.am, Cherrytree, Interscope; Formats: CD, digital download	33	—	—	—	172	—	—	—	—	—		MC: Gold
Sorry for Party Rocking	Released: June 17, 2011; Label: will.i.am, Cherrytree, Interscope; Formats: CD, digital download	5	2	11	2	6	19	11	2	13	8	US: 808,900; FRA: 210,000; World: 1,700,000	RIAA: Gold; ARIA: 3× Platinum; BPI: Platinum; BVMI: Gold; IFPI AUT: Platinum; IFPI SWI: Gold; IRMA: Gold; MC: 2× Platinum; RMNZ: Gold; SNEP: Platinum
"—" denotes a recording that did not chart or was not released in that territory.

=== Compilation albums ===
List of compilation albums, with selected details
Title	Details
I'm in Your City Trick	Released: July 21, 2009; Label: Interscope; Formats: CD, digital download

== Extended plays ==
List of extended plays
Title	Details
Party Rock	Released: July 1, 2008; Label: will.i.am, Cherrytree, Interscope; Formats: Digital download

== Singles ==
=== As lead artist ===
List of singles as lead artist, with selected chart positions and certifications, showing year released and album name
Title	Year	Peak chart positions										Certifications	Album
Title	Year	US	AUS	AUT	CAN	FRA	GER	IRL	NZ	SWI	UK	Certifications	Album
"I'm in Miami Bitch"	2008	51	27	—	37	—	—	—	—	—	86	ARIA: Platinum; MC: Platinum	Party Rock
"La La La"	2009	55	—	—	—	—	—	—	—	—	144		Party Rock
"Shots" (featuring Lil Jon)	2009	68	75	—	53	—	—	—	—	—	—	RIAA: 2× Platinum; ARIA: 2× Platinum; MC: Platinum; RMNZ: Platinum	Party Rock
"Yes"	2009	—	—	—	68	—	—	—	—	—	—	RIAA: Gold; MC: Gold	Party Rock
"Let the Bass Kick in Miami Bitch" (with Chuckie)	2009	—	55	—	—	—	—	47	—	—	9	BPI: Silver	Non-album single
"Party Rock Anthem" (featuring Lauren Bennett and GoonRock)	2011	1	1	1	1	1	1	1	1	1	1	RIAA: Diamond; ARIA: 15× Platinum; BPI: 3× Platinum; BVMI: 2× Platinum; IFPI SWI: 3× Platinum; MC: 6× Platinum; RMNZ: 4× Platinum; SNEP: Platinum	Sorry for Party Rocking
"Champagne Showers" (featuring Natalia Kills)	2011	— (Note: Although it did not make the Billboard Hot 100, "Champagne Showers" did peak at number 4 on the US Hot Dance Club Songs Chart.)	9	18	53	12	41	15	8	56	32	ARIA: 3× Platinum; IFPI SWI: Gold; MC: Gold	Sorry for Party Rocking
"Sexy and I Know It"	2011	1	1	7	1	3	8	4	1	7	5	RIAA: 8× Platinum; ARIA: 12× Platinum; BPI: 2× Platinum; BVMI: Gold; IFPI SWI: 2× Platinum; MC: 2× Platinum; RMNZ: 4× Platinum	Sorry for Party Rocking
"Sorry for Party Rocking"	2012	49	32	22	31	16	—	18	27	43	23	RIAA: Gold; ARIA: 2× Platinum; BPI: Silver; IFPI SWI: Gold	Sorry for Party Rocking
"—" denotes a recording that did not chart or was not released in that territory.

=== As featured artist ===
List of singles as featured artist, with selected chart positions and certifications, showing year released and album name
Title	Year	Peak chart positions										Certifications	Album
Title	Year	US	AUS	AUT	CAN	FRA	GER	IRL	NZ	SWI	UK	Certifications	Album
"Shooting Star" (Party Rock Remix) (David Rush featuring Kevin Rudolf, LMFAO and Pitbull)	2008	— (Note: Although it did not make the Billboard Hot 100, "Shooting Star (Party Rock Remix)" did reach number 33 on the US Pop 100 and peaked at number 9 on the Rhythmic Top 40.)	—	—	66	—	—	—	—	—	—		Feel the Rush Vol. 1
"Outta Your Mind" (Lil Jon featuring LMFAO)	2010	84	92	—	95	—	—	—	—	—	—		Crunk Rock
"Gettin' Over You" (David Guetta and Chris Willis featuring Fergie and LMFAO)	2010	31	5	4	12	1	15	4	3	11	1	ARIA: 2× Platinum; BPI: Platinum; BVMI: Gold; RMNZ: Platinum	One More Love
"Sine Language" (The Crystal Method featuring LMFAO)	2010	—	—	—	—	—	—	—	—	—	—		Divided by Night
"Livin' My Love" (Steve Aoki featuring LMFAO and Nervo)	2012	—	—	—	68	—	—	—	—	—	—		Wonderland
"Drink" (Lil Jon featuring LMFAO)	2012	— (Note: "Drink" did not enter the Billboard Hot 100, but peaked at number two on the Bubbling Under Hot 100 Singles chart.)	42	—	—	—	—	—	—	—	—		Non-album single
"Give Me All Your Luvin'" (Party Rock Remix) (Madonna featuring LMFAO and Nicki Minaj)	2012	—	—	—	—	—	—	—	—	—	—		MDNA
"—" denotes a recording that did not chart or was not released in that territory.

== Other charted songs ==
List of songs, with selected chart positions, showing year released and album name
Title	Year	Peak chart positions		Album
Title	Year	SVK	UK	Album
"One Day"	2011	—	104	Sorry for Party Rocking
"Best Night" (featuring will.i.am, GoonRock and Eva Simons)	2011	68	—	Sorry for Party Rocking
"—" denotes a recording that did not chart or was not released in that territory.

== Guest appearances ==
List of non-single guest appearances, with other performing artists, showing year released and album name
Title	Year	Other artist(s)	Album
"Release Me" (Party Rock Remix)	2008	Agnes	none
"This Is My Life"	2008	Hyper Crush	The Arcade
"Falling Down" (Party Rock Remix)	2009	Space Cowboy, Chelsea Corka	Digital Rock Star
"Back to the Future"	2009	Pitbull, Fergie	International Takeover: The United Nations
"Sucks to Be You"	2010	Clinton Sparks, JoJo	My Awesome Mixtape
"I Can't Dance"	2010	Dirt Nasty	Nasty as I Wanna Be

== Music videos ==
=== As lead artist ===
List of music videos as lead artist, showing year released and directors
Title	Year	Director(s)
"I'm in Miami Bitch"	2008	Ray Kay
"La La La"	2009	Mickey Finnegan
"Shots" (featuring Lil Jon)	2009	Mickey Finnegan
"Yes"	2010	Mickey Finnegan
"Party Rock Anthem" (featuring Lauren Bennett and GoonRock)	2011	Mickey Finnegan
"Champagne Showers" (featuring Natalia Kills)	2011	Mickey Finnegan
"Sexy and I Know It"	2011	Mickey Finnegan
"One Day"	2011	Mickey Finnegan
"Sorry for Party Rocking"	2012	Mickey Finnegan

=== As featured artist ===
List of music videos as featured artist, showing year released and directors
Title	Year	Director(s)
"Shooting Star" (Party Rock Remix) (David Rush featuring Kevin Rudolf, LMFAO and Pitbull)	2008	David Rousseau
"Outta Your Mind" (Lil Jon featuring LMFAO)	2010	David Rousseau
"Gettin' Over You" (David Guetta and Chris Willis featuring Fergie and LMFAO)	2010	Rich Lee
"I Can't Dance" (Dirt Nasty featuring LMFAO)	2010	Nicholaus Goossen
"Sine Language" (The Crystal Method featuring LMFAO)	2010	Robbie Ryan
"Drink" (Lil Jon featuring LMFAO)	2012	Ballard C. Boyd
