= Sorry for Party Rocking Tour =

2012 concert tour by LMFAO

- Tour by LMFAO
- Associated album: Sorry For Party Rocking
- Start date: February 16, 2012
- End date: November 13, 2012
- Legs: 2
- No. of shows: 80

The Sorry for Party Rocking Tour was the only concert tour by American electropop duo LMFAO. It was supported by their popular album Sorry For Party Rocking

== Background ==
LMFAO announced the North American concerts of the tour on February 27, 2012 via their Facebook page.

Due to the duo's busy schedule of invitations and proposals for events and concerts, the tour was extended but separately starting in September. Redfoo would continue the tour through Europe, North America and part of Asia, with performances under the name "Redfoo of LMFAO and the Party Rock Crew", while Sky Blu would do the same for Central and South America with performances under the name "Who Came to Party?! with Sky Blu of LMFAO"

== Opening acts ==
- Far East Movement — (North America)
- The Quest Crew — North America, part of the main set)
- Sidney Samson — (North America)
- Eva Simons — (North America)
- Natalia Kills — (North America)
- Matthew Koma — (North America)
- My Name Is Kay — (North America)

== Setlist ==
1. "Rock the Beat II"
2. "Sorry for Party Rocking"
3. "Get Crazy"
4. "Take It to the Hole"
5. "Put That A$$ to Work"
6. "I'm in Miami Bitch"
7. "Gettin' Over You"
8. "Boom Boom Pow"
9. "Shooting Star"
10. "Reminds Me of You"
11. "I Am Not a Whore"
12. "Hot Dog"
13. "One Day"
14. "La La La"
15. "Yes"
16. "Quest Crew Dance Mashup"
17. "Shots"

Encore

18. "Party Rock Anthem"
19. "Champagne Showers"
20. "Sexy And I Know It"

== Tour dates ==
Date	City	Country	Venue
North America
January 12, 2012	Solana Beach	United States	Belly Up Tavern
February 3, 2012	Indianapolis	United States	Super Bowl Village
February 4, 2012	Indianapolis	United States	The Crane Bay Event Center
Europe
February 16, 2012	Helsinki	Finland	The Circus
February 17, 2012	Tallinn	Estonia	Club Von Überblingen
February 18, 2012	Stockholm	Sweden	Annexet
February 20, 2012	Oslo	Norway	Oslo Spektrum
February 21, 2012	Copenhagen	Denmark	Falconer Salen
February 22, 2012	Hamburg	Germany	Markthalle
February 23, 2012	Rome	Italy	Spazio 900
February 24, 2012	Prague	Czech Republic	SaSaZu
February 25, 2012	Berlin	Germany	Hangar 2
February 26, 2012	Brussels	Belgium	Ancienne Belgique
February 27, 2012	Munich	Germany	Backstage
February 29, 2012	Paris	France	l'Olympia
March 1, 2012	Amsterdam	Netherlands	Heineken Music Hall
March 3, 2012	Esch-sur-Alzette	Luxembourg	Rockhal
March 4, 2012	Cologne	Germany	Luxor
March 5, 2012	Amsterdam	Netherlands	Paradiso
March 7, 2012	Manchester	England	Manchester Academy 1
March 8, 2012	London	England	Shepherds Bush Empire
March 9, 2012	Birmingham	England	O2 Academy Birmingham
March 10, 2012	Glasgow	Scotland	O2 ABC
March 12, 2012	Lyon	France	Halle Tony Garnier
March 13, 2012	Amnéville	France	Le Galaxie
March 14, 2012	Milan	Italy	Alcatraz
March 16, 2012	Madrid	Spain	Palacio Vistalegre
March 17, 2012	Barcelona	Spain	Sant Jordi Club
March 18, 2012	Marseille	France	Dock des Suds
March 21, 2012	Porto	Portugal	Coliseu do Porto
March 22, 2012	Lisbon	Portugal	Coliseu dos Recreios
Central America
March 24, 2012	Alajuela	Costa Rica	Autódromo La Guácima
Asia
April 5, 2012	Bangkok	Thailand	BITEC Bangna
April 7, 2012	Seoul	South Korea	Olympic Hall
April 11, 2012	Quezon City	Philippines	Araneta Coliseum
April 14, 2012	Cotai	Macau	Club CUBIC
Europe
April 17, 2012	Moscow	Russia	Arena Moscow
South America
April 26, 2012	Belém	Brazil	Hangar Centro de Convenções
April 27, 2012	Fortaleza	Brazil	Siara Hall
Europe
May 4, 2012	Ålgård	Norway	Kongeparken
May 7, 2012	Milan	Italy	Mediolanum Forum
May 11, 2012	Vienna	Austria	Stadthalle
May 12, 2012	Lyon	France	Halle Tony Garnier
May 14, 2012	Paris	France	Zénith de Paris
North America
May 22, 2012	Columbus	United States	Nationwide Arena
May 23, 2012	Auburn Hills	United States	The Palace of Auburn Hills
May 25, 2012	Minneapolis	United States	Target Center
May 26, 2012	Rosemont	United States	Allstate Arena
May 28, 2012	Morrison	United States	Red Rocks Amphitheatre
May 30, 2012	West Valley City	United States	Maverik Center
June 1, 2012	Spokane	United States	Spokane Arena
June 2, 2012	Seattle	United States	KeyArena
June 5, 2012	Los Angeles	United States	Staples Center
June 6, 2012	Sacramento	United States	Power Balance Pavilion
June 8, 2012	Oakland	United States	Oracle Arena
June 9, 2012	San Diego	United States	Valley View Casino Center
June 12, 2012	Houston	United States	Toyota Center
June 13, 2012	Tulsa	United States	BOK Center
June 15, 2012	Dallas	United States	American Airlines Center
June 19, 2012	Charlotte	United States	Bojangles' Coliseum
June 20, 2012	Atlanta	United States	Philips Arena
June 22, 2012	Miami	United States	American Airlines Arena
June 23, 2012	Orlando	United States	Amway Center
June 25, 2012	Fairfax	United States	Patriot Center
June 26, 2012	Uniondale	United States	Nassau Coliseum
June 28, 2012	Uncasville	United States	Mohegan Sun Arena
June 29, 2012	Newark	United States	Prudential Center
June 30, 2012	Philadelphia	United States	Wells Fargo Center
July 1, 2012	Worcester	United States	DCU Center
July 4, 2012	Toronto	Canada	Molson Canadian Amphitheater
July 6, 2012	Quebec City	Canada	Plains of Abraham
Europe
July 13, 2012	Oeiras	Portugal	Passeio Marítimo de Algés
July 15, 2012	Aix-les-Bains	France	Esplanade du Lac
July 20, 2012	Bordeaux	France	TVélodrome
July 21, 2012	Six-Fours-les-Plages	France	Ile du Gaou
July 23, 2012	Saint-Malô-du-Bois	France	Théâtre de Verdure
July 28, 2012	Tienen	Belgium	Centrum
August 7, 2012	Vilamoura	Portugal	Centro Hípico Vilamoura
August 10, 2012	Zofingen	Switzerland	Heiternplatz
August 12, 2012	Budapest	Hungary	Óbudai-Sziget
August 14, 2012	Bratislava	Slovakia	Incheba Expo Arena
September 25, 2012	Zaragoza	Spain	Pabellon Interpeñas
South America
September 29, 2012	Santiago	Chile	Club Hípico
September 10, 2012	Managua	Nicaragua	Estadio Nacional de Futbol
Asia
October 2, 2012	Tel Aviv	Israel	Nokia Arena
November 13, 2012	Hong Kong		AsiaWorld–Arena
