= Erin Beck =

American singer-songwriter

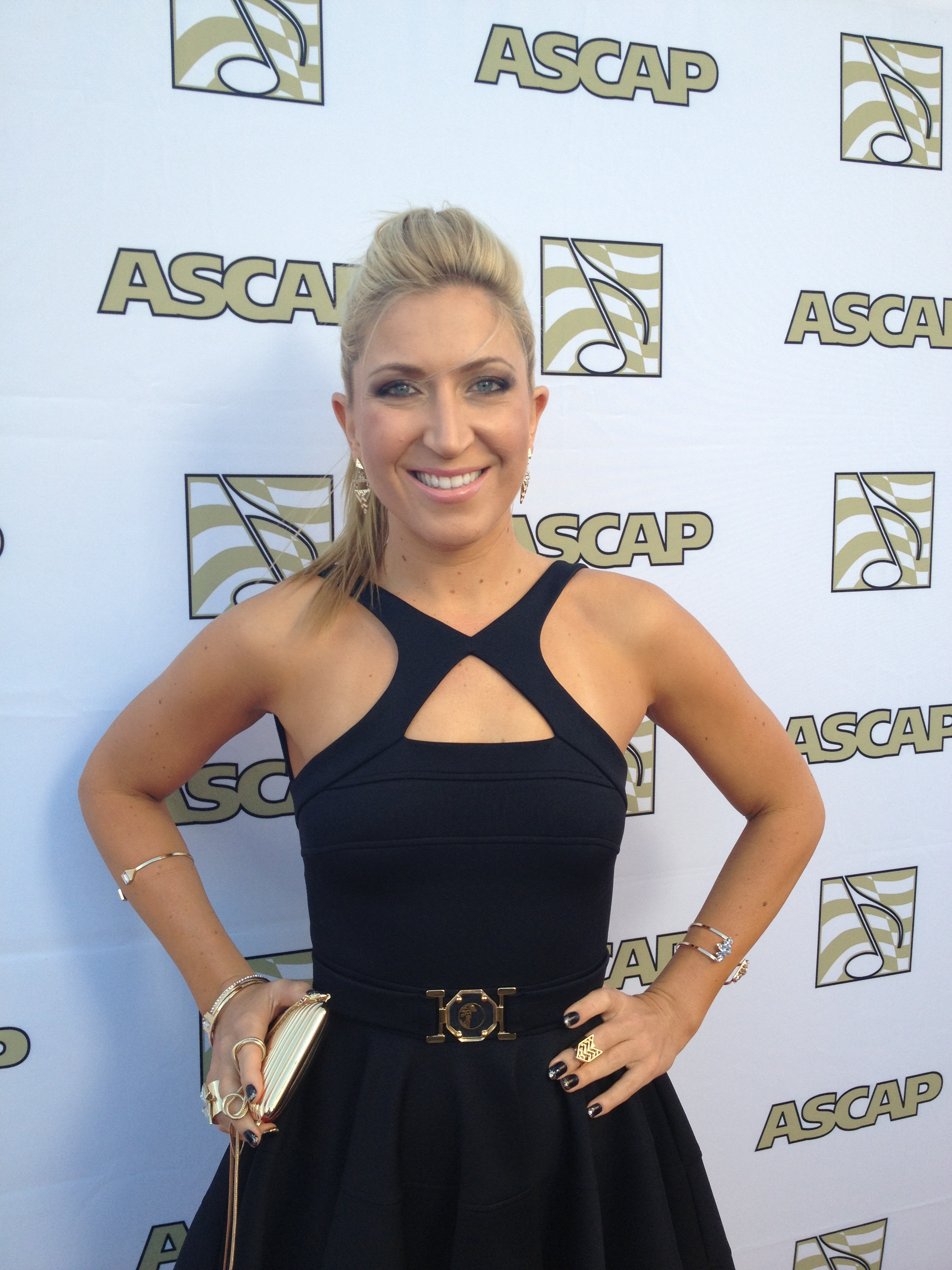
- Erin Beck on the red carpet at the 2013 ASCAP Pop Awards in Hollywood, CA.

Background information
- Also known as: Lyrically Blonde
- Born: Erin Beck; Dec 26; San Diego, California, United States
- Genres: Pop, EDM, indie pop, dance-rock, dance-pop, urban
- Occupation: Songwriter
- Years active: 2010 – present
- Labels: Warner/Chappell Music, Interscope
- Website: www.lyricallyblonde.com

Erin Beck (born December 26) is a Grammy-nominated American songwriter. She is best known as co-writer of the eight times platinum pop record "Sexy and I Know It" by the band LMFAO. Beck also co-wrote the title track from LMFAO's RIAA certified Gold second studio album, titled "Sorry For Party Rocking", along with Calvin Harris' "Reminds Me of You".

== Early life and education ==
Born in San Diego, California, she began writing at a young age under the encouragement of her mother, who was also a writer. While exploring writing through essay contests and short stories, she also developed a love of music, and she became involved with musical theater, her local worship band, and a bell choir. Beck first explored songwriting in high school, in the form of remixing songs from her favorite artists by re-writing their lyrics and re-recording her own vocals using a karaoke machine.

Beck graduated from UCLA with a degree in Film and Television, where she produced two short films, both of which she wrote the scores for.

== Early career ==
While still in school at UCLA, Beck began teaching LSAT prep courses for Blueprint Prep, where she first received the nickname "Legally Blonde," which would later turn into her writing persona "Lyrically Blonde." After graduating, Beck began to pursue a career in screenwriting, and she took a position at Ten Thirteen Productions as assistant to Chris Carter (creator of "The X-Files").

== Songwriting and career success ==
In 2010, Beck was introduced to Stefan Gordy, also known as "Redfoo" of the band LMFAO. At the time, LMFAO was working on their second album, titled "Don't Judge Me." Beck began collaborating with the writers and producers of the project, namely GoonRock and Redfoo, and co-wrote four songs that were released on the album including "Sexy and I Know It," "Sorry for Party Rocking," "Reminds Me of You," and "The Hot Dog Song." Prior to release of the album, Beck worked as in-house publicist for LMFAO. After Interscope released the album in June 2011, Beck went on tour with the band and worked as their sales manager. Acts the band toured with included Ke$ha, Far East Movement, Matthew Koma, Afrojack, and Avicii. Beck left tour to return to Los Angeles in November 2012. At that time, Beck began collaborating with new artists and writers. In November 2013, Beck signed a publishing deal with Warner/Chappell Music, the publishing entity of Warner Music Group.

The song "Sexy and I Know It" was nominated for Best Performance at the 55th Annual Grammy Awards. Beck also won ASCAP Pop Awards in both 2012 and 2013 for co-writing "Sexy and I Know It".

In 2013, Dimitri Vegas & Like Mike selected Beck and Kinetics & One Love (the writers behind B.o.B.'s hit "Airplanes") to co-write the vocal accompaniment to their track "Ocarina". The song, renamed "Find Tomorrow (Ocarina)", was to feature vocals by UK recording artist Katy B. It was released on November 29, 2013. In 2014, she co-wrote the vocal version of the Steve Aoki track "Delirious (Boneless)", featuring Kid Ink, along with Whitney Phillips, Jenson Vaughan, and Aid "Valsal" Vllasaliu.
