= GoonRock =

American musician and producer (born 1975)

- Born: David Jamahl Listenbee; April 18, 1975 (age 51); Princeton, New Jersey, U.S.
- Origin: Trenton, New Jersey; Hollywood, California
- Genres: Pop; EDM; dance; hip hop
- Occupations: Record producer; musician; singer; songwriter; rapper
- Years active: 2000s–present
- Label: Party Rock

David Jamahl Listenbee, better known by his stage name GoonRock, is an American record producer, musician, singer, songwriter and rapper. Raised in Los Angeles, California, early in his career he focused on hip hop and sold beats to artists such as Dr. Dre, Ne-Yo, Kanye West, and Juvenile. He later began incorporating club music. GoonRock co-wrote and co-produced a number of songs on LMFAO's 2011 album Sorry for Party Rocking, including hit singles "Party Rock Anthem" and "Sexy and I Know It."

In 2013, GoonRock co-wrote and produced "A Little Party Never Killed Nobody (All We Got)" for the international blockbuster film The Great Gatsby for Fergie featuring Q-Tip. In 2012 he co-wrote and produced two songs for Jennifer Lopez, including "Clothes Off" and "Goin' In". "Goin' In" peaked at #1 on the US Billboard Hot Dance Club Songs for 2012.

In 2015 and 2016 he released a number of singles under his last name Listenbee. These did not chart in the US or the UK, but had moderate success elsewhere in Europe.

== Early history ==
David Jamahl Listenbee was born in Princeton, New Jersey and raised in nearby Trenton. He lived in Chicago for some years before moving to Los Angeles, California at an early age. He attended junior high school with Redfoo, later of LMFAO, and will.i.am. Early in his career, GoonRock focused largely on hip hop and sold some beats to artists such as Dr. Dre. He at different points produced for Ne-Yo, Music Soulchild, Dr. Dre, Kanye West, and Juvenile. He worked on the Watch the Throne album (Kanye and Jay-Z) specifically the song "Lift Off" featuring Beyoncé. He's also worked with Ryan Tedder.

LMFAO had their first single "I'm in Miami Bitch" on will.i.am's label in 2008, and GoonRock began actively working with the duo in 2009. GoonRock and LMFAO started as hip hop musicians but were highly influenced by the late DJ AM, who introduced them to the house and electro music that they fell in love with such as Justice and the Crookers.

He co-produced, co-wrote, and performed guest vocals on the LMFAO song "We Came Here to Party". In mid-2010, LMFAO and Goonrock were featured in David Guetta's song "Gettin' Over You", which was an international hit, peaking top ten in eleven countries and three of them at number one, including in the United Kingdom. It also peaked 31 on the Billboard Hot 100 and 12 in Canada.

== Sorry for Party Rocking ==
GoonRock co-produced, co-wrote, and featured in a number of songs on LMFAO's 2010 sophomore album Sorry for Party Rocking. They released the full album on June 17, 2011, in the U.S. It was certified gold in early 2012, at which point it was approaching platinum.

=== "Party Rock Anthem" ===
The album's main single, "Party Rock Anthem", was first created by RedFoo of LMFAO and GoonRock. According to GoonRock, he originally wrote the song and the hook for Flo Rida, who passed on the song. RedFoo and GoonRock then changed the beat to "feel more epic, inviting, and fun" and recorded it themselves for LMFAO. "Party Rock Anthem" features British singer Lauren Bennett. Besides co-producing and co-writing the song, GoonRock also sang guest vocals on the song.

==== Reception ====
The song was released to DJs on New Year's Eve 2010, and debuted a week later at number 1 in Canada. It was officially released on January 25, 2011, and soon after began climbing the charts in 18 countries. The song spent six consecutive weeks on the US Billboard Top 100 at #1, and the video, as of December 2016, has over 1.21 billion views. The song also peaked at number-one in Canada, the UK, and over ten other countries, as well as the top ten in many others.

In 2011, the track was the #2 top selling song of 2011 on iTunes in the US, and was the #1 selling song on iTunes in the UK, Canada, New Zealand, Australia, Denmark, Norway, Finland and Sweden. It was also featured in a number of television commercials and shows, and was performed at the 2012 Super Bowl with Madonna.

=== "Champagne Showers" ===
The second single from Sorry for Party Rocking was released on May 27, 2011 and co-written by GoonRock. Titled "Champagne Showers," it features English singer-songwriter Natalia Kills. The song was performed on American Idol in April 2012.

=== "Sexy and I Know It" ===
He also co-wrote the third single, "Sexy and I Know It", which was released on October 3, 2011. It reached #1 on the iTunes charts worldwide and #1 on the Australian and Canadian Hot 100. “Sexy and I Know It” also reached #1 in UK, Canada, Denmark, Ireland, Austria, Japan and New Zealand, and hit #1 on both Billboard's R&B/Hip Hop Top 100 chart and the Billboard Hot 100 chart.

On April 18, 2012, he won two ASCAP Pop Awards for his work co-writing and producing the tracks "Party Rock Anthem" and "Sexy and I Know It". The awards were for "Most Performed Song." Shortly after, he and LMFAO were nominated for 17 different categories of the 2012 Billboard Music Awards, including Top Hot 100 Artist, Top Duo/Group and Top Pop Artist.

== Recent producing ==
As of late 2011, GoonRock has worked with Far East Movement and remixed a song for Rihanna. It has been reported that GoonRock is recording a new album on which he will write and produce tracks featuring different artists he's an admirer of. GoonRock is quoted as saying, "every beat I do I'm writing lyrics to as I make it. A lot of the times I have a vocal melody in my head and build the beat around it." He has also reportedly been in meetings with Ciara.

=== Work with Jennifer Lopez ===
On April 27, 2012 Digital Spy reported that Lopez had recorded two songs produced by GoonRock: "Clothes Off" and "Goin' In". Regarding GoonRock, Lopez was quoted as saying he is "very forward with his sound".

"Goin' In" was co-written by GoonRock, who also produced and mixed the song which speaks of the freedom found in dance. On May 10, GoonRock posted this message on his Twitter account "Crazy day finishing 2012 's Song of the Summer for @jlo and @Official_flo #goinin." The song made its radio premiere on May 24, 2012 on Ryan Seacrest's radio show On Air with Ryan Seacrest. The song is featured on the soundtrack of the dance film Step Up Revolution (2012) and on her first greatest hits album Dance Again... the Hits (2012). Lopez debuted "Goin' In" on the season final of American Idol May 23, 2012. "Goin' In" peaked at #1 on the US Billboard Hot Dance Club Songs chart for 2012.

Initial critical reception to the song was positive. Robbie Daw of the website Idolator claimed that "Goin' In" was the "hardest club track we’ve heard from the J.Lo canon in recent years."

== Discography ==
=== LMFAO singles ===
Year	Song	Role	Album
2011	"Best Night" (LMFAO featuring will.i.am, GoonRock and Eva Simons)	Production, writing, vocals	Sorry for Party Rocking
2011	"We Came Here to Party" (LMFAO featuring GoonRock)	Featured	Sorry for Party Rocking
2011	"Party Rock Anthem" (LMFAO featuring Lauren Bennett and GoonRock)	Featured, Production, Writing	Sorry for Party Rocking
2011	"Champagne Showers" (LMFAO featuring Natalia Kills)	Production	Sorry for Party Rocking
2011	"Sexy and I Know It" (LMFAO)	Production	Sorry for Party Rocking
2011	"One Day" (LMFAO)	Writing, Production	Sorry for Party Rocking
2011	"All Night Long" (LMFAO)	Writing	Sorry for Party Rocking
2011	"With You" (LMFAO)	Production, Writing, Vocals	Sorry for Party Rocking

=== Listenbee singles ===
Year	Song
2015	"Save Me" (Listenbee featuring Naz Tokio)
2015	"Nottamun Town"
2016	"Until We Go Down" (Listenbee featuring Ruelle)
2017	"Children" (Listenbee featuring Cosmos & Creature)

=== Other singles ===
Year	Song	Role	Chart	Peak Position
2012	"Goin' In" by Jennifer Lopez	co-writer producer mixer	Austria (Ö3 Austria Top 40)	58
2012	"Goin' In" by Jennifer Lopez	co-writer producer mixer	Brazil (Billboard Hot 100)	29
2012	"Goin' In" by Jennifer Lopez	co-writer producer mixer	Brazil (Billboard Hot Pop Songs)	12
2012	"Goin' In" by Jennifer Lopez	co-writer producer mixer	Canada Hot 100 (Billboard)	54
2012	"Goin' In" by Jennifer Lopez	co-writer producer mixer	US Dance Club Songs (Billboard)	1

Music Video Appearances
Year	Song	Album
2009	"Shots" (LMFAO featuring Lil Jon)	Party Rock
2011	"Party Rock Anthem" (LMFAO featuring Lauren Bennett and GoonRock)	Sorry for Party Rocking
2011	"Champagne Showers" (LMFAO featuring Natalia Kills)	Sorry for Party Rocking
2011	"Sexy and I Know It" (LMFAO)	Sorry for Party Rocking
2012	"Goin' In" (Jennifer Lopez featuring Flo Rida)	Dance Again... the Hits
