= Sorry for Party Rocking =

- Deluxe cover

Studio album by LMFAO
- Released: June 17, 2011
- Recorded: 2009–2011
- Genre: Hip hop
- Length: 37:15
- Labels: Interscope; A&M

LMFAO chronology
Party Rock (2009)	Sorry for Party Rocking (2011)

Singles from Sorry for Party Rocking
- 1. "Party Rock Anthem" Released: January 25, 2011; 2. "Champagne Showers" Released: May 26, 2011; 3. "Sexy and I Know It" Released: September 16, 2011; 4. "Sorry for Party Rocking" Released: January 17, 2012

Sorry for Party Rocking is the second and final studio album by American electronic duo LMFAO. It was released on June 17, 2011, physically and digitally by Interscope Records as the follow-up to their debut album Party Rock (2009). "Party Rock Anthem" was the first single released from the album and was an international hit. The second single was "Champagne Showers" and reached number eight in New Zealand, and nine in Australia. It became an international hit, also charting in France, Ireland, and Austria. The third single, "Sexy and I Know It" was released on September 16, 2011. It peaked at number one on the US Billboard Hot 100 and also topped the charts in Australia, Canada, and New Zealand. "Sorry for Party Rocking" was released on January 9, 2012, as the fourth single from the album and peaked at number 8 in Belgium, 16 in France, 18 in Ireland, 19 on the US Pop Songs, 23 in the United Kingdom, 27 in New Zealand, 31 in Canada, 32 in Australia, and 49 on the Billboard Hot 100.

== Release dates ==
The album was released first in New Zealand on June 17, 2011, followed by a UK release on July 18, 2011.

== Critical reception ==
Professional ratings
Aggregate scores
Source	Rating
Metacritic	47/100
Review scores
Source	Rating
AllMusic	3.5/5 stars
The A.V. Club	C−
Entertainment Weekly	C−
The Guardian	1/5 stars
The Independent	2/5 stars
NME	0/10
PopMatters	4/10
RapReviews	5/10
Rolling Stone	2/5 stars
The Telegraph	3/5 stars

Sorry for Party Rocking received mixed reviews from music critics. The album currently holds a score of 47 out of 100 on Metacritic, based on 13 reviews, indicating "mixed or average reviews". Josh Bush from AllMusic gave it a favorable review, awarding it three and a half out of five stars. He said "Their second album, Sorry for Party Rocking, arrives at exactly the right time and includes exactly the right mix of energy and humor, plus a surprising amount of sincerity." They highlighted "Sorry for Party Rocking", "Party Rock Anthem" and "Champagne Showers".

Billboard had said prior to the promotion "LMFAO is, of course, not "Sorry for Party Rocking." But the dance duo's sophomore album is "more refined" and more experimental than its 2009 debut, "Party Rock."

British music journal NME were particularly scathing, giving it a score of 0 out of 10. Criticizing the album, Sam Wolfson wrote "... it's not the persistent and aggressive misogyny that is the most soul-destroying thing about the record. Nor is it songs so imbecilic that if you ate a can of Alphabetti Spaghetti you could shit out more intelligent lyrics to a more pleasing tune... It's that... LMFAO understood the pain they would be inflicting on the world and did it anyway."

Some negative feedback have also come in about their rapping and dance beats through the album. Entertainment Weekly gave it a negative review saying "It's topped off by truly terrible rapping, which often turns otherwise groan-inspiring instrumentals into jumbled, maddening filler." The Rolling Stone gave it two stars out of five, positively highlighting that "MC-DJs Redfoo and Sky Blu turn in some skillful hip-hop", but they also said "but also get seriously stupid, rapping about spanking girls and bathing in champagne, over a cheesy pastiche of Eighties synths and pounding beats."

== Commercial performance ==
Sorry for Party Rocking debuted at number 12 on the US Billboard 200 with 27,100 copies sold in its first week. As of March 2012, the album had sold 808,900 copies in the United States. On the chart dated January 14, 2012 the album archived a peak position of number five on the Billboard 200, making it their first top 10 album in the US. The album has sold over 1.4 million copies worldwide.

== Singles ==
- "Party Rock Anthem" was the first single released from the album, released on January 25, 2011. It topped the charts in Australia, Belgium, Canada, France, Denmark, Germany, Ireland, New Zealand, Switzerland, United Kingdom, and the United States. The hit music video for Party Rock Anthem internationally popularized the rave dance "Melbourne Shuffle" which was revamped by David Mues, also known as "Robot Dave". To date, the music video has over 2 billion views on YouTube. It also topped the YouTube 100, along with their later single, "Sexy and I Know It".
- "Champagne Showers" was the second single released from the album, released on May 27, 2011. The single features British singer Natalia Kills. It stands as a top 10 hit in Australia and New Zealand, a top 20 hit in France and Ireland, and a top 40 hit in Belgium (Wallonia), Scotland, and the United Kingdom. The music video is the continuation of "Party Rock Anthem" and currently has more than 250 million views on YouTube and reached #14 on the YouTube 100.
- "Sexy and I Know It" was the third single released from the album, released on September 16, 2011. It topped the charts in Australia, Canada, New Zealand, and the United States. It stands as a top 10 hit in the United Kingdom, Ireland, the Netherlands, Germany, France, Scotland, Denmark, Switzerland, Belgium, Hungary, and Spain. To date, the music video has over 859 million views on YouTube. It also topped the YouTube 100 along with "Party Rock Anthem".
- "Sorry for Party Rocking" is the fourth single from the album, released on January 17, 2012. It stands as a top 10 hit in Belgium, a top 20 hit in France and Ireland, a top 40 hit in the United Kingdom, New Zealand and Australia. It has also charted #19 on the US Pop Songs and #49 in the United States. The music video is a prequel to "Party Rock Anthem" and it debuted on E! on 2/20/12 at 11:30PM ET. It currently has more than 500 million views on YouTube and has reached #3 on the YouTube 100.

=== Promotional singles ===
- "One Day" was released as the album's first promotional single. The song charted at number twenty-two on the UK Dance Charts and 104 on the Singles Chart.

=== Other charted songs ===
- "Rock the Beat II" received strong digital downloads in Portugal and charted at #43.
- "Best Night" received strong digital downloads in Slovakia and charted at #68.

== Track listing ==
No.	Title	Writer(s)	Producer(s)	Length
1.	"Rock the Beat II" (Intro)	Stefan Kendal Gordy; Skyler Austen Gordy; Kenneth Oliver	Redfoo; Audiobot; Josh Stevens (Note: Audio engineer)	1:53
2.	"Sorry for Party Rocking"	S. K. Gordy; S. A. Gordy; Erin Beck	Redfoo	3:23
3.	"Party Rock Anthem" (featuring GoonRock and Lauren Bennett)	S. K. Gordy; S. A. Gordy; David Listenbee; Peter Schroeder	GoonRock; Redfoo	4:22
4.	"Sexy and I Know It"	S. K. Gordy; Oliver; George Robertson; Listenbee; Beck	Audiobot; Redfoo; GoonRock	3:19
5.	"Champagne Showers" (featuring Natalia Kills)	S. K. Gordy; S. A. Gordy; Listenbee; Oliver	GoonRock; Redfoo; Audiobot; Josh Stevens	4:23
6.	"One Day"	S. K. Gordy; Listenbee; Oliver; D. Boyles	Audiobot; Redfoo; GoonRock	3:17
7.	"Take It to the Hole" (featuring Busta Rhymes)	S. K. Gordy; S. A. Gordy; Trevor Smith, Jr.; Rami Afuni; Josh Stevens	Rami Afuni; Josh Stevens	3:36
8.	"Best Night" (featuring will.i.am, GoonRock and Eva Simons)	S. K. Gordy; S. A. Gordy; Listenbee; William Adams, Jr.; Oliver	GoonRock; Redfoo; Audiobot	4:58
9.	"All Night Long" (featuring Lisa Tatjana)	S. K. Gordy; S. A. Gordy; Listenbee; Aaron Bay-Schuck; A. Smith; M. Perry	Redfoo; GoonRock	3:47
10.	"With You"	S. K. Gordy; S. A. Gordy; Listenbee; Smith; A. Louis; Josh Stevens	Goonrock	4:13
Total length:				37:15

iTunes Store bonus track
No.	Title	Producer(s)	Length
11.	"Party Rock Anthem (Benny Benassi Remix)" (featuring Lauren Bennett and GoonRock)	Benny Benassi (additional)	6:16

Deluxe version
No.	Title	Writer(s)	Producer(s)	Length
1.	"Rock the Beat II" (Intro)			1:53
2.	"Sorry for Party Rocking"			3:23
3.	"Party Rock Anthem" (featuring Lauren Bennett and GoonRock)			4:22
4.	"Sexy and I Know It"			3:19
5.	"Champagne Showers" (featuring Natalia Kills)			4:23
6.	"One Day"			3:17
7.	"Put That A$$ to Work"	S. K. Gordy; S. A. Gordy; Boyles	Redfoo	3:55
8.	"Take It to the Hole" (featuring Busta Rhymes)			3:35
9.	"We Came Here to Party" (featuring GoonRock)	S. K. Gordy; S. A. Gordy; Listenbee; Schroeder	GoonRock; Redfoo	3:45
10.	"Reminds Me of You" (featuring Calvin Harris)	Harris; S. K. Gordy; S. A. Gordy; Listenbee; Beck; Smith; Josh Stevens	Calvin Harris; Redfoo (Note: Vocal producer); Josh Stevens	3:46
11.	"Best Night" (featuring will.i.am, GoonRock and Eva Simons)			4:58
12.	"All Night Long" (featuring Lisa Tatjana)			3:46
13.	"With You"			4:13
14.	"Hot Dog"	S. K. Gordy; Beck	Redfoo	2:26

International edition
No.	Title	Writer(s)	Producer(s)	Length
1.	"Rock the Beat II" (Intro)			1:53
2.	"Sorry for Party Rocking"			3:23
3.	"Party Rock Anthem" (featuring Lauren Bennett and GoonRock)			4:22
4.	"Sexy and I Know It"			3:19
5.	"Champagne Showers" (featuring Natalia Kills)			4:23
6.	"One Day"			3:17
7.	"Put That A$$ to Work"	S. K. Gordy; S. A. Gordy; Boyles	Redfoo	3:55
8.	"Take It to the Hole" (featuring Busta Rhymes)			3:35
9.	"We Came Here to Party" (featuring GoonRock)	S. K. Gordy; S. A. Gordy; Listenbee; Schroeder	GoonRock; Redfoo	3:45
10.	"Reminds Me of You" (featuring Calvin Harris)	Harris; S. K. Gordy; S. A. Gordy; Listenbee; Beck; Smith; Josh Stevens	Calvin Harris; Redfoo; Josh Stevens	3:46
11.	"Best Night" (featuring will.i.am, GoonRock and Eva Simons)			4:58
12.	"All Night Long" (featuring Lisa Tatjana)			3:46
13.	"With You"			4:13
14.	"Hot Dog"	S. K. Gordy; Beck	Redfoo	2:26
15.	"I'm in Miami Bitch"			3:48
16.	"Shots" (featuring Lil Jon)			3:41

International iTunes Store bonus track
No.	Title	Producer(s)	Length
17.	"Party Rock Anthem (Benny Benassi Remix)" (featuring Lauren Bennett and GoonRock)	Benny Benassi (additional)	6:16

UK and Ireland digital edition bonus tracks
No.	Title	Producer(s)	Length
17.	"Party Rock Anthem (Audiobot Remix)" (featuring Lauren Bennett and GoonRock)	Benny Benassi (additional)	6:00
18.	"Party Rock Anthem (Benny Benassi Remix)" (featuring Lauren Bennett and GoonRock)	Benny Benassi (additional)	6:16

Japan edition bonus tracks
No.	Title	Length
17.	"La La La"	3:29
18.	"Yes"	3:03

Notes

Sample credits

- "Reminds Me of You" samples the song "Awooga" by Calvin Harris
- "We Came Here to Party" samples the song "Flashback" by Calvin Harris

== Charts ==
=== Weekly charts ===
Weekly chart performance for Sorry for Party Rocking
Chart (2011–2012)	Peak position
Australian Albums (ARIA)	2
Austrian Albums (Ö3 Austria)	11
Belgian Albums (Ultratop Flanders)	12
Belgian Albums (Ultratop Wallonia)	10
Canadian Albums (Billboard)	2
Danish Albums (Hitlisten)	40
Dutch Albums (Album Top 100)	40
French Albums (SNEP)	6
German Albums (Offizielle Top 100)	19
German Download Albums (Media Control)	4
Greece Albums (IFPI Greece)	9
Irish Albums (IRMA)	11
Italian Albums (FIMI)	61
Japenese Albums (Oricon)	13
Mexican Albums (AMPROFON)	8
New Zealand Albums (RMNZ)	2
Polish Albums (ZPAV	88
Portuguese Albums (AFP)	11
Scottish Albums (Official Charts)	7
South African Albums (RiSA)	6
Spanish Albums (Promusicae)	11
Swiss Albums (Schweizer Hitparade)	13
UK Albums (Official Charts)	8
US Billboard 200	5
US Top Dance Albums (Billboard)	1
US Top Rap Albums (Billboard)	2

=== Year-end charts ===
2011 year-end chart performance for Sorry for Party Rocking
Chart (2011)	Position
Australian Albums (ARIA)	5
Canadian Albums (Billboard)	10
Mexican Albums (AMPROFON)	22
Swiss Albums (Schweizer Hitparade)	72
UK Albums (OCC)	138
US Billboard 200	132

2012 year-end chart performance for Sorry for Party Rocking
Chart (2012)	Position
Australian Albums (ARIA)	31
Canadian Albums (Billboard)	6
Mexican Albums (AMPROFON)	30
Swiss Albums (Schweizer Hitparade)	63
UK Albums (OCC)	51
US Billboard 200	28
US Top Dance Albums (Billboard)	1
US Top Rap Albums (Billboard)	3

=== Decade-end charts ===
Decade-end chart performance for Sorry for Party Rocking
Chart (2010–2019)	Position
Australian Albums (ARIA)	26
US Billboard 200	188

== Certifications ==
Region	Certification	Certified units/sales
Australia (ARIA)	4× Platinum	280,000^{^}
Austria (IFPI Austria)	Platinum	20,000^{*}
Belgium (BRMA)	Gold	15,000^{*}
Canada (Music Canada)	2× Platinum	160,000^{^}
Denmark (IFPI Danmark)	Platinum	20,000^{‡}
France (SNEP)	2× Platinum	200,000^{*}
Germany (BVMI)	Gold	100,000^{^}
Ireland (IRMA)	Gold	7,500^{^}
Italy (FIMI)	Gold	25,000^{‡}
Japan (RIAJ)	Gold	100,000^{^}
Mexico (AMPROFON)	Platinum	60,000^{^}
New Zealand (RMNZ)	Gold	7,500^{^}
Poland (ZPAV)	Gold	10,000^{*}
Singapore (RIAS)	Gold	5,000^{*}
Sweden (GLF)	Gold	20,000^{‡}
Switzerland (IFPI Switzerland)	Gold	15,000^{^}
United Kingdom (BPI)	Platinum	300,000^{‡}
United States (RIAA)	Gold	500,000^{^}
Venezuela	Gold	
^{*} Sales figures based on certification alone.^{^} Shipments figures based on certification alone.^{‡} Sales+streaming figures based on certification alone.

== Release history ==
Country	Date	Format	Label
New Zealand	17 June 2011	CD, digital download	Universal Music
France	20 June 2011	CD, digital download	Universal Music
United States	21 June 2011	CD, digital download	Interscope Records
Brazil	12 July 2011	CD, digital download	Universal Music
Japan	13 July 2011	CD, digital download	Universal Music
United Kingdom	18 July 2011	CD, digital download	Polydor
Poland	12 August 2011	CD, digital download	Universal Music
