= I'm in Miami Bitch =

Single by LMFAO

from the album Party Rock
- Released: August 2008
- Recorded: 2008
- Genre: Electro-crunk
- Length: 3:52 (album version); 4:37 (video version)
- Label: Interscope, will.i.am Music Group, Cherrytree
- Songwriters: Stefan Gordy, Skyler Gordy
- Producers: Redfoo, Sky Blu

LMFAO singles chronology
"Shooting Star" (2008)	"I'm in Miami Bitch" (2008)	"La La La" (2009)

Music video
- "I'm in Miami Trick" on YouTube

"I'm in Miami Bitch" (edited for radio as "I'm in Miami Trick") is the debut single by American electronic dance music duo LMFAO. It was officially released to radio in August 2008, serving as the lead single from their debut studio album Party Rock (2009).

The song peaked at No. 51 on the U.S. Billboard Hot 100 chart in July 2009. The song has also charted on the Canadian Hot 100, peaking at No. 37. An official remix was later released, featuring American rapper Pitbull.

"I'm in Miami Bitch" served as the theme song for the 2009 reality television program Kourtney and Khloé Take Miami. A "New York" version was used for the 2011 reality television program Kourtney and Kim Take New York.

== Music video ==
The music video for "I'm in Miami Trick" was uploaded to YouTube by LMFAO on October 5, 2009. The music video exists in an explicit and a clean version which both feature several girls in polka-dot bikinis, including the porn star Jenny Hendrix.

== Charts ==
Chart (2009–2010)	Peak position
Australia (ARIA)	27
Canada Hot 100 (Billboard)	37
Canada CHR/Top 40 (Billboard)	18
UK Singles (Official Charts)	86
UK Dance (Official Charts)	7
UK R&B (Official Charts Company)	24
US Billboard Hot 100	51
US Pop Airplay (Billboard)	27
US Rhythmic Airplay (Billboard)	37

== Certifications ==
Region	Certification	Certified units/sales
Australia (ARIA)	Platinum	70,000^{^}
Canada (Music Canada)	Platinum	40,000^{*}
^{*} Sales figures based on certification alone.^{^} Shipments figures based on certification alone.

== Chuckie remix ==
In early 2009, Chicago DJ/producer 'DJ Inphinity' created a bootleg using the Silvio Ecomo remix of DJ Chuckie's 2008 hit "Let the Bass Kick" and the a cappella of LMFAO's "I'm in Miami Bitch", creating "Let the Bass Kick in Miami Bitch" (or "Let the Bass Kick in Miami Girl" as the radio edit). The bootleg was spread across the internet and was a massive success at the Miami Winter Music Conference 2009. "Let the Bass Kick in Miami Bitch/Girl" was released in Europe in late 2009, peaking within the top ten of the charts in the United Kingdom, and within the top 20 of the charts in Belgium (Flanders) and the Netherlands. "Let the Bass Kick in Miami Bitch/Girl" peaked at number nine on the UK Singles Chart, and topped the UK Dance Singles Chart and UK Independent Singles Chart, making the United Kingdom the only territory in which "Gettin' Over You" was not LMFAO's first top ten song.

=== Charts ===
Chart (2009–2010)	Peak position
Australia (ARIA Charts)	55
Belgium (Ultratop 50 Flanders)	17
Belgium (Ultratop 50 Wallonia)	38
Netherlands (Dutch Top 40)	17
Netherlands (Single Top 100)	23
UK Singles (Official Charts)	9
UK Dance (Official Charts)	1
UK Indie (Official Charts)	1

Chart (2011)	Peak position
UK Singles (Official Charts)	65
UK Dance (Official Charts)	9

=== Certifications ===
Region	Certification	Certified units/sales
United Kingdom (BPI)	Silver	200,000^{‡}
^{‡} Sales+streaming figures based on certification alone.

== I'm in Your City Trick ==
I'm in Your City Trick

Compilation album by LMFAO
- Released: July 21, 2009
- Genre: Electro-crunk
- Length: 3:13:15
- Labels: Interscope; will.i.am Music Group; Cherrytree
- Producers: SkyBlu; Redfoo

LMFAO chronology
Party Rock (2009)	I'm in Your City Trick (2009)	Sorry for Party Rocking (2011)

In July 2009, a compilation album of mostly clean versions of "I'm in Miami Bitch", with Miami swapped out for numerous US cities, known as "I'm in Your City Trick", was released. The album, totaling 51 tracks (including the explicit versions for San Diego ("I'm in Diego Bitch"), Las Vegas ("I'm in Las Vegas Bitch"), San Francisco ("I'm in the Bay Bitch") and Phoenix ("I'm in the Valley Bitch"), as well as the Boroughs Mix for New York, remixes for Miami and San Diego with Pitbull and a separate remix for Las Vegas), includes cities ranging in population from Los Angeles to New Bedford. Most of these versions were used by local radio stations instead of the original "I'm in Miami Trick".

=== "I'm in Saints Row Bitch" ===
In October 2011, an advert for the video game Saints Row: The Third depicts a similar variation swapping out Miami for Saints Row. There is however no full release of this version.

== Release history ==
Region	Date	Format	Version	Label	Ref.
United States	November 25, 2008	Digital download	"I'm in Miami Bitch"	Interscope	
United States	November 25, 2008	Digital download	"I'm in Miami Trick"	Interscope	
United States	January 20, 2009	Rhythmic radio	"I'm in Miami Trick"	Interscope	
United States	June 8, 2009	Contemporary hit radio	"I'm in Miami Trick"	Interscope	
United States	July 21, 2009	Digital download	I'm in Your City Trick	Interscope	
United Kingdom	December 6, 2009	Digital download	"Let the Bass Kick in Miami Girl"	Cr2 Records	
United Kingdom	December 7, 2009	CD single	"Let the Bass Kick in Miami Girl"	Cr2 Records	
