= Shots (LMFAO song) =

2009 single by LMFAO featuring Lil Jon

Single by LMFAO featuring Lil Jon

from the album Party Rock and Crunk Rock
- Released: 2009
- Genre: Electronic; dance
- Length: 3:42
- Label: Interscope; will.i.am; Cherrytree
- Songwriters: Stefan Gordy; Skyler Gordy; Jonathan Smith; Eric Delatorre
- Producers: LMFAO; Lil Jon

LMFAO singles chronology
"La La La" (2009)	"Shots" (2009)	"Yes" (2009)

Lil Jon singles chronology
"Patron Tequila" (2009)	"Shots" (2009)	"Do You Remember" (2009)

Music video
- "Shots" on YouTube

"Shots" is a song by the American electronic music duo LMFAO featuring the rapper Lil Jon. It was released as the third single from the duo's first album Party Rock, it also appeared on Lil Jon's debut solo album Crunk Rock. The song was written by Redfoo, Sky Blu, Lil Jon and Eric Delatorre.

In the 2010s, the song became a go-to drinking anthem and pub song, it can also be a communal drinking song, citing the repetitive chorus chant of "Shots, Shots, Shots!" being used colloquially.

== Music video ==
The music video for the song was uploaded to YouTube on December 4, 2009. The video was filmed at Tao Beach at the Venetian Hotel in Las Vegas. The video begins with people sunbathing at the Tao Beach pool. Suddenly, Lil Jon, LMFAO, Q, Eric D-Lux, and many others appear out of nowhere and began singing the song. The video also features GoonRock, who later appears in LMFAO's hit singles "Party Rock Anthem" and "Champagne Showers".

== Track listings ==
Album version

1. "Shots" (Explicit version) – 3:42
2. "Shots" (Clean version) – 3:39

Digital download

1. "Shots" (Dummejungs Remix) – 5:06
2. "Shots" (Electro Remix) – 4:48

== Credits and personnel ==
- Lead vocals – LMFAO and Lil Jon
- Additional vocals – Eric D-Lux
- Lyrics – Jonathan Smith, Skyler Austen Gordy, Stefan Kendal Gordy, Eric Delatorre
- Label: Interscope, will.i.am, Cherrytree

== Popular culture ==
Thirteen years later, during the COVID-19 pandemic, Shots was used as an incentive at pharmacies and clinics in North America as a celebratory song for the general public getting vaccinated, being a word play for the COVID-19 "shot" or "jab".

== Charts ==
Chart performance for "Shots"
Chart (2010)	Peak position
Australia (ARIA)	75
Canada Hot 100 (Billboard)	53
South Korea International Singles (Gaon)	47
US Billboard Hot 100	68
US Heatseekers Songs (Billboard)	2

== Certifications and sales ==
Certifications and sales for "Shots"
Region	Certification	Certified units/sales
Australia (ARIA)	2× Platinum	140,000^{^}
Canada (Music Canada)	Platinum	40,000^{*}
Japan (RIAJ) Digital	Gold	100,000^{*}
New Zealand (RMNZ)	Platinum	30,000^{‡}
South Korea	—	565,884
United States (RIAA)	2× Platinum	2,000,000^{*}
^{*} Sales figures based on certification alone.^{^} Shipments figures based on certification alone.^{‡} Sales+streaming figures based on certification alone.
