= Sky Blu (rapper) =

American singer (born 1986)

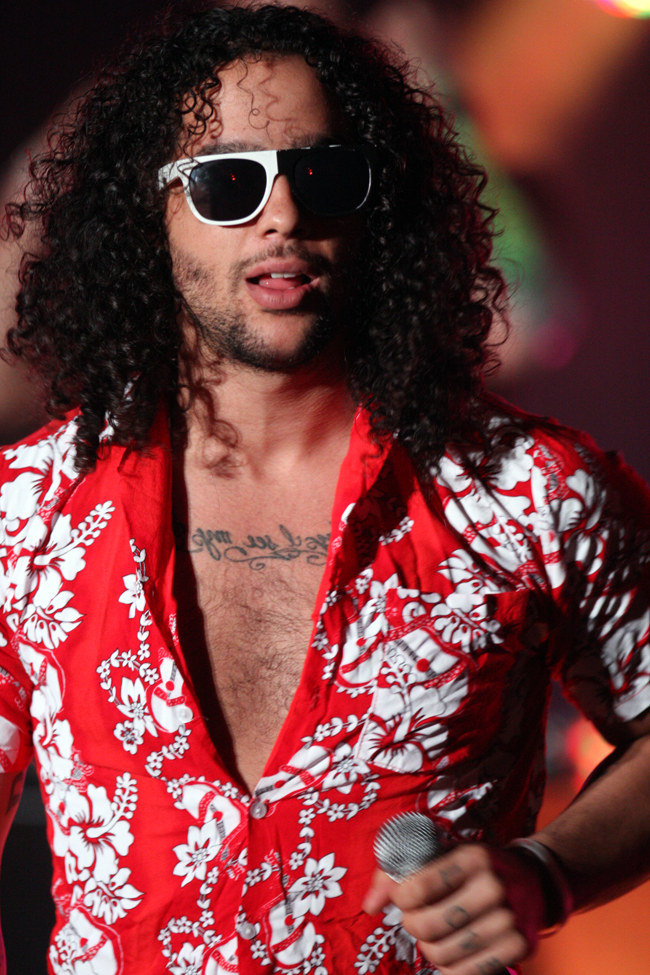
- Sky Blu in 2011

Background information
- Born: Skyler Austen Gordy; August 23, 1986 (age 40); Los Angeles, California, U.S.
- Genres: Pop; hip-hop; electropop
- Occupations: rapper; singer; record producer; disc jockey; dancer
- Years active: 2006–present
- Labels: Cherrytree; Interscope; Foo & Blu
- Formerly of: Big Bad University; LMFAO

Skyler Austen Gordy (born August 23, 1986), better known by his stage name Sky Blu (stylized as 8ky 6lu), is an American rapper, singer, record producer, DJ, and dancer. He is known as part of the EDM duo LMFAO, which he formed with his half-uncle Redfoo in 2006. The duo are best known for their 2011 singles "Party Rock Anthem" and "Sexy and I Know It," both of which peaked atop the Billboard Hot 100. They released two studio albums, Party Rock (2009) and Sorry for Party Rocking (2011), before disbanding in 2012. As a solo act, Gordy has released the albums Rebel Music (2013) and Fxck Yeah: Chaos To Consciousness (2016).

== Career ==
In 2006, Gordy, under the stage name Sky Blu, teamed up with his uncle Redfoo to form LMFAO. The band started in Miami, Florida, and released rap songs over electronic beats. They are known for their hit songs "Party Rock Anthem" and "Sexy and I Know It," which were released in 2011. "Party Rock Anthem" became the most successful song of their career, peaking at number one in over ten countries, including France, the UK, the U.S., Canada, New Zealand, Germany, Ireland, and Australia. Redfoo announced that LMFAO would go on hiatus in 2012. Earlier that year, LMFAO performed alongside Madonna at the Super Bowl XLVI halftime. Gordy later claimed in a Facebook post in 2016 that Redfoo had tried to claim all of the band's royalties for himself and that the latter had announced LMFAO's hiatus a year after not speaking with Gordy, who had suffered a serious back injury.

In October 2010, Gordy and his girlfriend Chelsea Korka created BIG BAD out of their Hollywood home which is an entertainment company consisting of musicians, artists, producers, DJs, inventors, creators, and had successful tours in America, Dominican Republic, South America, Asia, and parts of Europe. Gordy also created Big Bad University ("the first university for dreamers"), a collective of artists, which was mainly composed of rapper Shwayze, Korka, and producer/singer/songwriter Mark Rosas.

In 2013, Sky released his two first singles "Pop Bottles" and "Salud". That year he also released his 9-track first album Rebel Music, and a second album We Evolve Everyday as free downloads. In 2014, Gordy introduced to the world his alter ego The Party President and a new stylization of his name 8ky 6lu, followed by the release his single "Go On Girl". Gordy explained that the numbers 86 represented his birth year. In December that year, Gordy was invited to the Miss World ceremony to perform his single "We Love Girls" with KG Superstar. Sky released an album, Chaos to Consciousness under his new artist name 8ky 6ordy (pronounced Sky Gordy) in 2016.

== Personal life ==
Gordy was born in Los Angeles to Berry Gordy IV (the eldest son of Motown founder Berry Gordy) and Valerie Robeson. He is the brother of Mahogany Lox. Singer-songwriters Rockwell and Rhonda Ross Kendrick are his half-uncle and half-aunt via his grandfather Berry Gordy III, respectively. Other relatives include his half-uncle (and former LMFAO bandmate) Redfoo; as well as second cousin twice removed Jimmy Carter, second cousin Bianca Lawson, and fourth cousin Jason Carter.

According to Gordy, he attended 12 different schools growing up; he ultimately dropped out of high school without taking the GED.

In January 2009, Interscope Records arranged a studio session for Paradiso Girls with LMFAO. Gordy began a relationship with Paradiso Girls member Chelsea Korka, who featured as his love interest in some music videos.

== Discography ==
=== Albums ===
Solo

- Rebel Music (2013)
- Fxck Yeah: Chaos to Consciousness (2016)

With LMFAO

- Party Rock (2009)
- Sorry for Party Rocking (2011)

As W.E.E.D.

- We Evolve Every Day (2012)

=== Singles ===
==== As lead artist ====
List of singles as lead artist, with selected chart positions, showing year released and album name
Title	Year	Peak chart positions		Album
Title	Year	US Dance	CAN	Album
"Pop Bottles" (featuring Mark Rosas)	2013	25	87	Rebel Music
"Salud" (featuring Reek Rude, Sensato and Wilmer Valderrama)	2013	—	—	Rebel Music
"Go On Girl"	2014	—	—	Non-album singles
"We Love Girls" (featuring KG Superstar)	2015	—	—	Non-album singles
"Fxck Yeah"	2015	—	—	Fxck Yeah: Chaos to Consciousness
"Guacamole" (with Sensato)	2016	—	—	Non-album singles
"Figure It Out" (with Sensato)	2016	—	—	Non-album singles
"—" denotes a recording that did not chart or was not released in that territory.

==== As featured artist ====
- Drunk Off Your Love – Shwayze and Cisco featuring Sky Blu
- I Need A Girl – BLAC featuring Sky Blu
- Uh Oh (Came Here To Party) – Leaf featuring Sky Blu
- Tonight (I'm F***in' You) (Hyper Crush Remix) – Enrique Iglesias featuring Hyper Crush and Sky Blu
- All Of The Time – Mark Rosas featuring Sky Blu and Shwayze
- Small Potatoes – Mark Rosas featuring Sky Blu and Shwayze
- Alcohol (Remix) – The Cataracs featuring Sky Blu
- Bolt – Shwayze featuring Sky Blu
- Perfect Gentleman – Shwayze featuring Sky Blu
- Maldito Jumo – Juan Magan featuring Sky Blu, Sensato, Victor Magan and Reek Rude
- Esta Noche Esta De Fiesta (Electronic Version) – J King & Maximam ft 3Ball MTY & Sky Blu
- Feel Alive - TELYKast featuring Sky Blu
- GASLiGHT - Mahogany Lox featuring Sky Blu

==== As producer ====
- #SEXSONG – Big Bad
- Boom – Mahogany Lox

=== Remixes ===
- Dirty Horn (Talk Dirty Remix) – Jason Derulo featuring Sky Blu
- Draft Day (8ky 6lu Remix) – Drake featuring Sky Blu
- We Dem Boyz (8ky 6lu Remix) - Wiz Khalifa featuring Sky Blu
- Happy (8ky 6lu Remix) – Pharrell Williams featuring Sky Blu
- I Won't Go (Big Bad Remix) – Adele featuring Shwayze, Sky Blu & Mark Rosas
- Partition (8ky 6lu Remix) – Beyoncé featuring Sky Blu

=== Music video appearances ===
- Love Is Overrated – Shwayze
- Reaction – Mark Rosas featuring Chelsea Korka
- Boom – Mahogany Lox

== Guest appearances ==
List of non-single guest appearances, with other performing artists, showing year released and album name
Title	Year	Other artist(s)	Album
"Billionaire" (Party Rock Remix)	2010	Travie McCoy, Bruno Mars, Gucci Mane	Lazarus
"Outta Your Mind"	2010	Lil Jon, Redfoo	Crunk Rock
"Tonight (I'm Fuckin' You)" (Hyper Crush Remix)	2010	Enrique Iglesias, Hyper Crush	Tonight (I'm Fuckin' You)
"Uh-Oh (Came Here to Party)"	2011	Leaf	none
"Bolt"	2012	Shwayze	Shwayzed & Confused
"La Noche Esta de Fiesta Aka Hoy Si Que Se Bebe (Party Rock Remix)	2013	J-King y Maximan, 3BallMTY	Los Sucesores
"Happy" (8KY 6LU Remix)	2014	Pharrell Williams	Happy
"Maldito Jumo"	2015	Juan Magan, Sensato, Victor Magan, Reek Rude	The King Is Back (LatinIBIZAte)
