= Yes (LMFAO song) =

Single by LMFAO

from the album Party Rock
- Released: 2010
- Recorded: sometime in 2006–07
- Genre: Electro house; comedy
- Length: 3:03
- Label: Interscope, will.i.am Music Group, Cherrytree
- Songwriters: Skyler Austen Gordy and Stefan Kendal Gordy
- Producers: S.K. Gordy & S.A. Gordy

LMFAO singles chronology
"Shots" (2009)	"Yes" (2010)	"Gettin' Over You" (2010)

Music video
- "Yes" on YouTube

"Yes" is a song written, produced, and performed by American electronic dance music duo LMFAO. It was released as the fourth single from their debut studio album Party Rock..

== Music video ==
The official music video for the song was uploaded to YouTube on July 24, 2010. It is LMFAO's longest music video to date. The song was later released as a promotional CD single in 2010.

The music video starts off with Redfoo, SkyBlu, the ShuffleBot, and Q getting ready to play in the 2010 Broom Cup Final, a fictional curling tournament. While they are getting ready, Redfoo calls out a speech which ends with him speaking the chorus of the song ("Every day I see my dream. Every day I see my, every day I see my dream."). They then chant "We eat 'em up, We swallow 'em down, We spit 'em out, No homo." After they leave the changing room, Redfoo sees Jamie Foxx sweeping the floor, and he then heads off to play. The song suddenly starts with several LMFAO fans cheering in the crowd holding up signs, posters, and several Party Rock foam fingers. Team LMFAO is about to play against the team Cobra McGavin. SkyBlu throws the curling stone as Redfoo and Q are sweeping, and Redfoo's verse begins. The first stone places perfectly in the scoring zone at the end. The song continues through a montage of curling ends during the chorus, followed by SkyBlu's verse which is sung as he throws a stone which hits two of their opponent's stones, knocking them out of the scoring zone. The music stops and the video suddenly switches to the commentators Dirt Nasty and Ben Hoffman who are commentating that team LMFAO is winning the game. The video then switches back to LMFAO playing Cobra McGavin. The leader from Cobra McGavin appears to tell a henchman to break Redfoo's broom, which Q sees and accidentally breaks his own broom while stopping the henchman. Q says he broke his arm and suddenly Jamie Foxx volunteers as an alternate for Q. SkyBlu then throws the final stone and it lands perfectly in the scoring zone, knocking out the team Cobra McGavin stone that was there previously. Team LMFAO then wins the Broom Cup and starts cheering with the fans. The last shot shows Team LMFAO and the commentators taking a picture of them.

The Broom Cup is in part a parody of the tournament in the 2004 film DodgeBall: A True Underdog Story.

The original music video was released on Redfoo's channel in October 2007 and sees him and SkyBlu in a car singing to song's lyrics.

== Credits and personnel ==
- Lead vocals – LMFAO
- Lyrics – Skyler Austen Gordy and Stefan Kendal Gordy
- Label: Interscope, will.i.am Music Group, Cherrytree

== Charts ==
Chart (2010)	Peak position
Canada Hot 100 (Billboard)	68

== Certifications ==
Region	Certification	Certified units/sales
Canada (Music Canada)	Gold	20,000^{*}
United States (RIAA)	Gold	500,000^{^}
^{*} Sales figures based on certification alone.^{^} Shipments figures based on certification alone.
