= Sexy and I Know It =

2011 single by LMFAO

Single by LMFAO

from the album Sorry for Party Rocking
- Released: September 16, 2011
- Genre: Dance; rave-pop; electro house
- Length: 5:21 (extended version); 3:19 (radio edit)
- Label: Interscope
- Songwriters: Stefan Kendal Gordy; David Jamahl Listenbee; Erin Beck; George M. Robertson; Kenneth Oliver
- Producers: Audiobot; Redfoo; GoonRock

LMFAO singles chronology
"Champagne Showers" (2011)	"Sexy and I Know It" (2011)	"Livin' My Love" (2012)

Music video
- "Sexy and I Know It" on YouTube

"Sexy and I Know It" is a song by American duo LMFAO from their second and final studio album, Sorry for Party Rocking. It was released as the third single from the album on September 16, 2011. The song was written by Stefan Kendal Gordy, GoonRock, Erin Beck, George M. Robertson and Kenneth Oliver, and it was produced by Party Rock. It went to number one on the Billboard Hot 100 on January 7, 2012, and remained there for two weeks.

The song became LMFAO's second number one hit on the Billboard Hot 100 in the United States (after "Party Rock Anthem"), making them the first duo to have two successive number-one singles since Outkast's "Hey Ya!" (2003) and "The Way You Move" (2004). The song also reached number one in Australia, Canada, Israel, and New Zealand, and charted within the top ten in nearly every country in which it charted.

== Commercial performance ==
"Sexy And I Know It" debuted at number 76 on the week issue of September 17, 2011, on the US Billboard Hot 100. It later moved to number 50 being the greatest gainer of the week. The song launched into number 25 on the week of October 1, 2011. It jumped into the Top 10 the next week being LMFAO's second Top 10 hit behind Party Rock Anthem. The song peaked at number two on the week of November 19, 2011, being blocked by Rihanna's "We Found Love". It stayed at the position for seven consecutive weeks before hitting the top on the week of January 7, 2012. It remained on the Hot 100 for 42 weeks.

== Music video ==
The music video for "Sexy and I Know It" was filmed in Venice, California, and uploaded on LMFAO's YouTube channel on September 16, 2011. It features Redfoo and a group of men including Hok from Quest Crew, Shuffle Bot, Nathan Pasley and Q dancing around town in speedos in front of women. In several scenes it shows Redfoo lifting weights. Chelsea Korka, Ron Jeremy, Alexis Texas, Wilmer Valderrama, Alistair Overeem, Kali Muscle, Victor Kim, Steve Terada, Lola Blanc, Ryan Conferido, Ryan Feng of Quest Crew, Mindy Robinson, Jamie Foxx, Angelo Marconi, Darren Mabee, Darla George, and Simon Rex all have cameos in the video. The music video on YouTube has been flagged for sexual content several times since its release. The final shot of the video pays homage to the final shot of Michael Jackson's Thriller: it shows Shuffle Bot leaving with the girls while he turns his head towards the camera behind him and the image freezes. If the Official Video is being aired or played on any public music channels on TV, the parts where the men show off their Speedos are usually censored with a yellow smiling face.

== Track listing ==
- CD single
1. "Sexy and I Know It" (album version) – 3:19
2. "Sexy and I Know It" (Mord Fustang) – 5:21
- Digital download
1. "Sexy and I Know It" (Audiobot Remix) – 5:55
2. "Sexy and I Know It" (Mord Fustang Remix) – 5:19
3. "Sexy and I Know It" (Tomba and Borgore Remix) – 3:41
4. "Sexy and I Know It" (LA Riots Remix) – 5:40
5. "Sexy and I Know It" (DallasK Remix) – 5:42
6. "Sexy and I Know It" (Fuego's Moombahton Remix) – 3:51
7. "Sexy and I Know It" (MADEin82 Remix ft Sky Blu) – 6:01

== Credits and personnel ==
- Lead vocals – LMFAO
- Producers – Party Rock
- Lyrics – Stefan Kendal Gordy, Jamahl Listenbee, Erin Beck, George M. Robertson, Kenneth Oliver
- Label: Interscope

== Charts ==
=== Weekly charts ===
Weekly chart performance
Chart (2011–2012)	Peak position
Australia (ARIA)	1
Australia Dance (ARIA)	1
Austria (Ö3 Austria Top 40)	7
Belgium (Ultratop 50 Flanders)	6
Belgium Dance (Ultratop Flanders)	3
Belgium (Ultratop 50 Wallonia)	5
Belgium Dance (Ultratop Wallonia)	3
Brazil (Billboard Brasil Hot 100)	43
Brazil Hot Pop Songs	18
Canada Hot 100 (Billboard)	1
Colombia (National-Report)	4
Czech Republic Airplay (ČNS IFPI)	12
Denmark (Tracklisten)	7
Europe (Euro Digital Songs)	3
Finland (Suomen virallinen lista)	3
France (SNEP)	3
Germany (GfK)	8
Hungary (Dance Top 40)	3
Hungary (Single Top 40)	4
Ireland (IRMA)	4
Israel International Airplay (Media Forest)	1
Italy (FIMI)	28
Italian Airplay (EarOne)	139
Japan Hot 100 (Billboard)	42
Luxembourg (Billboard)	2
Mexico (Billboard Mexican Airplay)	3
Mexico Anglo (Monitor Latino)	4
Netherlands (Dutch Top 40)	8
Netherlands (Mega Dance Top 30)	1
Netherlands (Single Top 100)	7
New Zealand (Recorded Music NZ)	1
Norway (VG-lista)	3
Poland Dance (ZPAV)	6
Portugal (Billboard)	7
Romania (Romanian Top 100)	71
Russia Airplay (TopHit)	1
Russia (2M)	4
Scottish Singles Sales (Official Charts)	4
Slovakia Airplay (ČNS IFPI)	23
South Korea International Singles (Gaon)	32
Spain (Promusicae)	4
Sweden (Sverigetopplistan)	2
Switzerland (Schweizer Hitparade)	7
UK Dance (Official Charts)	2
UK Singles (Official Charts)	5
Ukraine Airplay (TopHit)	20
US Billboard Hot 100	1
US Adult Pop Airplay (Billboard)	27
US Dance Club Songs (Billboard)	1
US Dance Airplay (Billboard)	2
US Hot Latin Songs (Billboard)	8
US Hot R&B/Hip-Hop Songs (Billboard)	93
US Hot Rap Songs (Billboard)	8
US Pop Airplay (Billboard)	2
US Rhythmic Airplay (Billboard)	2

=== Year-end charts ===
Year-end chart performance
Chart (2011)	Position
Australia (ARIA)	6
Australia Dance (ARIA)	1
Austria (Ö3 Austria Top 40)	61
Belgium (Ultratop Flanders)	56
Belgium Dance (Ultratop Flanders)	1
Belgium (Ultratop Wallonia)	100
Belgium Dance (Ultratop Wallonia)	45
Canada (Canadian Hot 100)	30
Denmark (Tracklisten)	38
France (SNEP)	42
Germany (Official German Charts)	72
Hungary (Dance Top 40)	37
Netherlands (Dutch Top 40)	43
Netherlands (Single Top 100)	40
New Zealand (Recorded Music NZ)	11
Polish Dance Singles Chart	43
Russia Airplay (TopHit)	188
Sweden (Sverigetopplistan)	23
Switzerland (Schweizer Hitparade)	63
UK Singles (Official Charts Company)	31
US Billboard Hot 100	57
US Dance/Electronic Digital Songs (Billboard)	1

Year-end chart performance
Chart (2012)	Position
Australia (ARIA)	37
Australia Dance (ARIA)	6
Austria (Ö3 Austria Top 40)	51
Belgium (Ultratop Flanders)	45
Belgium Dance (Ultratop Flanders)	63
Belgium (Ultratop Wallonia)	19
Belgium Dance (Ultratop Wallonia)	37
Brazil (Crowley)	26
Canada (Canadian Hot 100)	7
France (SNEP)	28
Germany (Official German Charts)	84
Hungary (Dance Top 40)	1
Italy (FIMI)	93
Netherlands (Single Top 100)	38
New Zealand (Recorded Music NZ)	46
Poland (ZPAV)	19
Russia Airplay (TopHit)	17
Spain (PROMUSICAE)	21
Sweden (Sverigetopplistan)	37
Switzerland (Schweizer Hitparade)	32
Ukraine Airplay (TopHit)	158
UK Singles (Official Charts Company)	30
US Billboard Hot 100	13
US Dance/Mix Show Airplay (Billboard)	14
US Latin Pop Songs (Billboard)	28
US Hot Latin Songs (Billboard)	39
US Mainstream Top 40 (Billboard)	25
US Rhythmic (Billboard)	27

=== Decade-end charts ===
2010s chart rankings for "Sexy and I Know It"
Chart (2010–2019)	Position
Australia (ARIA)	24
US Billboard Hot 100	37

=== All-time charts ===
All-time chart performance
Chart (1958–2018)	Position
US Billboard Hot 100	143
UK Singles Chart	177

== Certifications ==
Certifications
Region	Certification	Certified units/sales
Australia (ARIA)	12× Platinum	840,000^{^}
Belgium (BRMA)	Platinum	30,000^{*}
Brazil (Pro-Música Brasil)	Diamond	250,000^{‡}
Canada (Music Canada)	2× Platinum	673,000
Denmark (IFPI Danmark)	Platinum	30,000^{^}
Germany (BVMI)	Platinum	300,000^{‡}
Italy (FIMI)	Platinum	30,000^{*}
New Zealand (RMNZ)	4× Platinum	60,000^{*}
Spain (Promusicae)	Gold	20,000^{*}
Sweden (GLF)	4× Platinum	160,000^{‡}
Switzerland (IFPI Switzerland)	2× Platinum	60,000^{^}
United Kingdom (BPI)	2× Platinum	1,200,000^{‡}
United States (RIAA)	8× Platinum	8,000,000
Streaming
Denmark (IFPI Danmark)	Platinum	100,000^{†}
^{*} Sales figures based on certification alone.^{^} Shipments figures based on certification alone.^{‡} Sales+streaming figures based on certification alone.^{†} Streaming-only figures based on certification alone.

== Release history ==
Release dates for "Sexy and I Know It"
Country	Date	Format	Label
United States	September 27, 2011	Digital download	Interscope Records
Germany	October 21, 2011	CD single	Universal Music

== Glee cast featuring Ricky Martin version ==
In 2012, the Glee cast recorded a Spanglish cover of the song, featuring Puerto Rican singer Ricky Martin. The song was released as single from Glee: The Music, The Complete Season Three, in 2012, and it reached number 81 on the Billboard Hot 100.

== See also ==
- List of number-one dance singles of 2011 (U.S.)
- List of best-selling singles in Australia
