= Gettin' Over You =

2010 single by David Guetta and Chris Willis

Single by David Guetta and Chris Willis featuring Fergie and LMFAO

from the album One More Love
- Released: 12 April 2010
- Genre: Electro house; hip house
- Length: 3:02 (as "Gettin' Over"); 3:08 (as "Gettin' Over You")
- Label: EMI Music France; Virgin
- Songwriters: Chris Willis; will.i.am; Fergie; Red Foo, Sky Blu; David Guetta; Jean-Claude Sindres; Frédéric Riesterer; Sandy Vee
- Producers: David Guetta; Jean-Claude Sindres; Sandy Vee; Frédéric Riesterer

David Guetta singles chronology
"Memories" (2010)	"Gettin' Over You" (2010)	"Wavin' Flag (Celebration Mix)" (2010)

Chris Willis singles chronology
"Everytime We Touch" (2009)	"Gettin' Over You" (2010)	"Louder (Put Your Hands Up)" (2011)

Fergie singles chronology
"We Are the World 25 for Haiti" (2010)	"Gettin' Over You" (2010)	"Beautiful Dangerous" (2010)

LMFAO singles chronology
"Yes" (2009)	"Gettin' Over You" (2010)	"Party Rock Anthem" (2011)

Music video
- "Gettin' Over You" on YouTube

"Gettin' Over" is a dance song by French DJ and record producer David Guetta and American singer Chris Willis, from Guetta's fourth studio album, One Love. An additional version, known as "Gettin' Over You", features vocals by the Black Eyed Peas member Fergie and hip hop duo LMFAO, and was released as the lead single from One More Love on 12 April 2010.

The song became Guetta's first number-one hit in France and topped the dance charts in the United Kingdom and United States. It reached top five positions in Australia, Austria, Ireland, Italy and New Zealand.

== Background and composition ==
The lyrics are written by Fergie, Willis, will.i.am and LMFAO. will.i.am was originally intended to perform the vocals alongside Willis and Fergie but he was replaced by LMFAO. In an interview with Digital Spy, Guetta described the song as "one of my more traditional guitar-sounding club tracks – in the vein of 'Love Is Gone'." He said since he refused to let The Black Eyed Peas record the original version for their album The E.N.D., they decided to re-record the song with Fergie. Guetta explained, "Even after I refused to let the Peas have it, Fergie was still saying, 'I love that track!' So I said, 'If you still want to do it, then we'll do it together'. I wanted to keep Chris Willis on there because I've been working with him since the beginning [...] He's the best singer on the planet."

Redfoo from LMFAO told MTV News the concept of the song: "You're in love with a girl and then you guys separate," he said, then joked, "She probably got with Lil Jon or somebody," before continuing, "So I'm gonna party 'til you come get me."

"Gettin' Over You" is written in the key of F minor and is in common time with a tempo of 130 beats per minute. The song uses open fifths instead of a chord progression.

== Critical reception ==
Robert Copsey of Digital Spy gave the song three out of five stars. He felt that despite the song's "pounding beats and jaggedy axe" that "LMFAO ruin[s] the breakdown, proving that too many cooks can spoil an otherwise tasty electro-housey broth." Chris Willis's vocal performance was praised by Entertainment Weekly stating: "Willis has a pleasant rasp to his voice, and he guts this one out like the lives of millions of glowsticks hang in the balance". A reviewer from FemaleFirst' stated that "Gettin' Over You" is a "huge summer anthem" and gave it four out of five stars.

== Music video ==
The music video began production on 20 April 2010 with Rich Lee who has in the past filmed videos for The Black Eyed Peas. The music video premiered on Tuesday, 18 May 2010. It features Guetta, Willis, Fergie and LMFAO all producing the song in a recording studio. A young guy then overhears them and gets his friends who bring recording equipment which draws in more young people who enter the studio, Guetta, Fergie, and Willis are surprised at first but then accept their presence and go outside with the fans, they finish their song, all the young people applaud the performance.

== Track listing ==
No.	Title	Length
1.	"Gettin' Over You" (Full Remix)	6:56
2.	"Gettin' Over You" (Radio Edit)	3:06
3.	"Gettin' Over You" (Extended Mix)	6:00
4.	"Gettin' Over You" (Mitomi Tokoto Remix)	7:50
5.	"Gettin' Over You" (Sidney Samson Remix)	6:02
6.	"Gettin' Over You" (Avicii's Vocal Mix at Night Vocal Mix)	6:15
7.	"Gettin' Over You" (Avicii's Vocal Mix at Night Dub Mix)	6:15
8.	"Gettin' Over You" (Thomas Gold Remix)	6:35

== Charts ==
=== Weekly charts ===
Chart (2010–2012)	Peak position
Australia (ARIA)	5
Austria (Ö3 Austria Top 40)	4
Belgium (Ultratop 50 Flanders)	18
Belgium (Ultratop 50 Wallonia)	12
Canada Hot 100 (Billboard)	12
Czech Republic Airplay (ČNS IFPI)	5
Denmark (Tracklisten)	19
Europe (Eurochart Hot 100)	2
France (SNEP)	1
Germany (GfK)	15
Hungary (Dance Top 40)	3
Hungary (Rádiós Top 40)	40
Hungary (Single Top 40)	2
Ireland (IRMA)	4
Italy (FIMI)	3
Italian Airplay (EarOne)	43
Mexican Anglo Airplay (Monitor Latino)	1
Netherlands (Single Top 100)	21
New Zealand (Recorded Music NZ)	3
Norway (VG-lista)	20
Poland Dance (ZPAV)	4
Portugal Digital Song Sales (Billboard)	7
Russian Airplay (TopHit)	65
Scottish Singles Sales (Official Charts)	1
Slovakia Airplay (ČNS IFPI)	1
South Korea International (Gaon)	188
Spain (Promusicae)	13
Sweden (Sverigetopplistan)	28
Switzerland (Schweizer Hitparade)	11
UK Dance (Official Charts)	1
UK Singles (Official Charts)	1
US Billboard Hot 100	31
US Dance Club Songs (Billboard)	1
US Dance Airplay (Billboard)	1
US Pop Airplay (Billboard)	21

=== Year-end charts ===
Chart (2010)	Position
Australia (ARIA)	39
Austria (Ö3 Austria Top 40)	31
Belgium (Ultratop Flanders)	62
Belgium (Ultratop Wallonia)	52
Brazil (Crowley)	93
Canada (Canadian Hot 100)	81
Europe (European Hot 100)	29
France (SNEP)	25
Germany (Official German Charts)	51
Hungary (Dance Top 40)	5
Italy (FIMI)	31
New Zealand (Recorded Music NZ)	39
Russia Airplay (TopHit)	189
Spain (PROMUSICAE)	36
Switzerland (Schweizer Hitparade)	54
UK (OCC)	52
US Dance Club Songs (Billboard)	29
US Dance/Mix Show Airplay (Billboard)	9

== Certifications ==
Region	Certification	Certified units/sales
Australia (ARIA)	2× Platinum	140,000^{^}
Austria (IFPI Austria)	Gold	15,000^{*}
Germany (BVMI)	Gold	150,000^{^}
Italy (FIMI)	Platinum	30,000^{*}
New Zealand (RMNZ)	Platinum	15,000^{*}
Spain (Promusicae)	Gold	20,000^{*}
Sweden (GLF)	Platinum	40,000^{‡}
United Kingdom (BPI)	Platinum	600,000^{‡}
^{*} Sales figures based on certification alone.^{^} Shipments figures based on certification alone.^{‡} Sales+streaming figures based on certification alone.

== Release history ==
Region	Date	Label	Format	Ref.
France	12 April 2010	Virgin Records	Digital download	
France	31 May 2010	Virgin Records	CD	
Germany	12 April 2010	Virgin Records	Digital download	
Germany	28 May 2010	Virgin Records	CD	
United States	17 May 2010	Astralwerks	Digital download	
United Kingdom	31 May 2010	Virgin Records	Digital download	

== See also ==
- List of number-one hits of 2010 (France)
- List of number-one singles and albums of 2010 (Scotland)
- List of number-one singles from the 2010s (UK)
- List of number-one dance hits of 2010 (UK)
- List of number-one dance singles of 2010 (U.S.)
- List of number-one dance airplay hits of 2010 (U.S.)
