= La La La (LMFAO song) =

Single by LMFAO

from the album Party Rock
- Released: September 8, 2009
- Recorded: 2009
- Genre: Alternative hip hop; dance
- Length: 3:30
- Label: Interscope, will.i.am Music Group, Cherrytree
- Songwriters: S.A. Gordy & S.K. Gordy
- Producers: S.A. Gordy & S.K. Gordy

LMFAO singles chronology
"I'm in Miami Bitch" (2008)	"La La La" (2009)	"Shots" (2009)

Music video
- "La La La" on YouTube

"La La La" is a song performed by American electro recording duo LMFAO. It was released as the second single from their debut studio album Party Rock (2009) and first sent to airplay on September 8, 2009.

The song was used in a dance performance choreographed by Napoleon and Tabitha D'umo during the 61st Primetime Emmy Awards featuring Karina Smirnoff and Maksim Chmerkovskiy from Dancing With The Stars; Joshua Allen, Katee Shean, and Mark Kanemura from So You Think You Can Dance, and Quest Crew from America's Best Dance Crew.

The song garnered average commercial outcomes for LMFAO in the U.S., compared to those of their previous single "I'm in Miami Trick". The song reached its highest peak on the Billboard Hot 100, at number fifty-five.

== Music and structure ==
"La La La" is an uptempo song in the key of C minor that has prominent electropop and dance characteristics with influences of 1980s synthpop. It is lyrically about feeling "on top of the world" from having an obsessive love/compassion for someone. It is composed heavily of 1980's synthesizers, rhythmic hi-hats, and the usage of a vocoder during the song's chorus.

== Critical reception ==
Fawn Renee of Planet Ill commented that "“La La La” slows the pace of the album down a bit, with its heavily synthesized, rhythmic hi-hat beat, and substantive lyrics about the stimulation behind developing feelings for the opposite sex. This proves to be a nice change-of-pace for an album laden with songs that make you feel like you’re at a never-ending rave." Mikael Wood of Los Angeles Times commented that "Yet like will.i.am of The Black Eyed Peas, the rapper at least views hedonism as a participatory endeavor, not just something to be creepily observed from the VIP section. That gives tracks such as "La La La" and "Leaving U 4 the Groove" a welcome sense of conviviality." John Bush of Allmusic favored "La La La".

== Music video ==
The music video was released by Universal Music Group on November 25, 2009. The video starts with Redfoo engineering a simulation on their computer called "La La La Experience". Sky Blu volunteers to try it out by inserting the likeness of the girl desired to test it. They stare at pictures of American pop group Paradiso Girls, especially at group member Chelsea Korka (who is Sky Blu's girlfriend in reality). They take her picture and add it into the simulation. The program then begins with a portion of "Lil' Hipster Girl" leading into the title-song of the music-video. The video features a colorful neo-space theme that fits the song's lyrics of euphoria and love of a woman. Sky Blu and Red Foo are seen interacting separately with their love interests (Korka & Jonna Mannion from The Real World: Cancun respectively) during each verse and many characters are seen during the chorus and the ending of the song. This video also includes the first known appearance of the Shuffle Bot. In this video, the Shuffle Bot is silver, in the new ones it is gold.

== Popular culture ==
- This song is available as DLC for the karaoke game Lips.

== Charts ==
Chart (2009)	Peak position
Slovakia Airplay (ČNS IFPI)	57
UK Singles (Official Charts Company)	144
US Billboard Hot 100	55
US Heatseekers Songs (Billboard)	1
US Hot Rap Songs (Billboard)	20
US Pop Airplay (Billboard)	38
