= Party Rock =

Studio album by LMFAO
- Released: July 7, 2009
- Recorded: 2006–2009
- Length: 49:40
- Label: will.i.am; Cherrytree; Interscope

LMFAO chronology
Party Rock (2009)	Sorry for Party Rocking (2011)

Singles from Party Rock
- 1. "I'm in Miami Bitch" Released: August 2008; 2. "La La La" Released: September 8, 2009; 3. "Shots" Released: October 13, 2009; 4. "Yes" Released: December 15, 2009

Party Rock is the debut studio album by American electronic duo LMFAO, released on July 7, 2009 by Interscope Records. "I'm in Miami Bitch" was the first single from the album, released in August 2008. The second single, "La La La", was released on September 8, 2009. The third single, "Shots" was released on October 13, 2009. "Yes" was the fourth single from the album, released on December 15, 2009.

== Background ==
The album has prominent electronic characteristics with influences of hip hop, 1980s synthpop and dance with lyrics about partying, and having a good time in the night life. The EP version was released to iTunes on July 1, 2008. The album was nominated at the 52nd Annual Grammy Awards for Best Electronic/Dance Album and lost to Lady Gaga's The Fame. It was tracked and mixed at KMA Music in Manhattan. LMFAO started in 2008 with their single "I'm in Miami Bitch".

== Singles ==
- "I'm in Miami Bitch" was the first single released from the album, released in August 2008. It peaked at No. 86 in the UK, No. 51 on the Billboard Hot 100, No. 37 on the Canadian Hot 100, No. 27 in Australia, and No. 1 on the Billboard Hotseekers Songs. The song was used as the theme song for the show Kourtney and Khloé Take Miami. The "New York" version of the song was used as the theme song for the show Kourtney and Kim Take New York. The music video has over 39 million views on YouTube.
- "La La La" was the second single released from the album, released on September 8, 2009. It peaked at No. 55 on the Billboard Hot 100. It also charted No. 38 on the Billboard Pop Songs, No. 20 on the Billboard Rap Songs, and No. 1 on the Billboard Hotseekers Songs. The music video has over 92 million views on YouTube.
- "Shots", which features Lil Jon was the third single released from the album, released on October 13, 2009. It peaked No. 77 in Australia, No. 68 on the Billboard Hot 100, No. 53 on the Canadian Hot 100, and No. 2 on the Billboard Hotseekers Songs. The music video has over 242 million views on YouTube.
- "Yes" was the fourth single released from the album, released on December 15, 2009. It peaked at No. 68 on the Canadian Hot 100. The music video has over 66 million views on YouTube.

=== Promotional singles ===
- "Get Crazy" was released as the album's first promotional single. The song "Get Crazy" is used as the theme song for the MTV reality show Jersey Shore & Jersey Shore Family Vacation, and is featured in the popular iPod/iPhone game Tap Tap Revenge 3.

== Reception ==
Professional ratings
Review scores
Source	Rating
AllMusic	3/5 stars
Blogcritics	2/5 stars
HipHopSite.Com	2/4 stars
Los Angeles Times	2/4 stars
RapReviews	(6/10)
Rolling Stone	2.5/5 stars

Initial critical response to Party Rock was mixed. At Metacritic, which assigns a normalized rating out of 100 to reviews from mainstream critics, the album has received an average score of 63, based on four reviews. Mikael Wood of the Los Angeles Times calls Party Rock a mixture of the "same pleasures as those remixes: thumping 1980s-inspired beats, instantly catchy synth hooks, shouty catchphrases about how "what happens at the party stays at the party."" Ginger Clements of Billboard said that "DJ/rappers Redfoo and Sky Blu (the son and grandson, respectively, of Motown founder Berry Gordy) fulfill all the lyrical requirements for a summer anthem—sunny locale, sexual tension and a liquor-assisted nonstop party." John Bush of AllMusic called Party Rock "an indulgent record with plenty of fun and immaturity, but a real need for a growing musical identity." Jon Dolan of Rolling Stone calls Party Rock "a mixture of sleazy jams, booty boasts and enough irony to clog your Jacuzzi."

== Track listing ==
Standard edition
No.	Title	Length
1.	"Rock the Beat"	0:54
2.	"I'm in Miami Bitch"	3:48
3.	"Get Crazy"	3:45
4.	"Lil' Hipster Girl"	3:21
5.	"La La La"	3:29
6.	"What Happens at the Party"	5:54
7.	"Leaving U 4 the Groove"	3:31
8.	"I Don't Wanna Be"	3:37
9.	"Shots" (featuring Lil Jon)	3:41
10.	"Bounce"	4:02
11.	"I Shake, I Move"	3:03
12.	"I Am Not a Whore"	3:15
13.	"Yes"	3:03
14.	"Scream My Name"	4:17
Total length:		49:40

iTunes Store bonus track
No.	Title	Length
15.	"Get on Down"	3:13
Total length:		52:53

Amazon MP3 bonus track
No.	Title	Length
16.	"A Song About Us"	5:55
Total length:		58:48

Party Rock EP
No.	Title	Length
1.	"I'm in the Motherfucking 305 Bitch"	3:49
2.	"Yes"	3:06
3.	"I Am Not a Whore"	3:16
4.	"La La La"	3:31
5.	"I'm in Miami Trick"	3:51

== Charts ==
=== Weekly charts ===
Chart (2009–2013)	Peak position
French Albums (SNEP)	172
US Billboard 200	33
US Top Dance Albums (Billboard)	2

=== Year-end charts ===
Chart (2009)	Position
US Top Dance/Electronic Albums (Billboard)	8
Chart (2010)	Position
US Top Dance/Electronic Albums (Billboard)	9

== Certifications ==
Region	Certification	Certified units/sales
Canada (Music Canada)	Gold	40,000^{^}
^{^} Shipments figures based on certification alone.
