= Champagne Showers =

2011 single by LMFAO featuring Natalia Kills

Single by LMFAO featuring Natalia Kills

from the album Sorry for Party Rocking
- Released: May 26, 2011
- Recorded: 2010
- Genre: Dance-pop
- Length: 4:24
- Label: Interscope
- Songwriters: Stefan Gordy; Skyler Gordy; David Listenbee; Kenneth Oliver
- Producers: GoonRock; Redfoo; Audiobot

LMFAO singles chronology
"Party Rock Anthem" (2011)	"Champagne Showers" (2011)	"Sexy and I Know It" (2011)

Natalia Kills singles chronology
"Wonderland" (2011)	"Champagne Showers" (2011)	"Free" (2011)

Music video
- "Champagne Showers" on YouTube

Audio sample
- file; help

"Champagne Showers" is a song performed by American EDM/electro hop duo LMFAO, featuring vocals from British singer-songwriter Natalia Kills. It was released as the second single from the album Sorry for Party Rocking (2011). This song was an international hit in New Zealand, Australia, France, Ireland and Austria, peaking at numbers 8, 9, 12, 15 and 18, respectively. The song stayed in the Australian top 50 for 27 weeks and in the French top 200 for 50 weeks.

== Background ==
The song was reportedly inspired by a post-season holiday undertaken by Australian Football League (AFL) player Jude Bolton and several of his Sydney Swans teammates to Los Angeles during the 2010 post-season.

== Music video ==
The music video for the song was uploaded to YouTube on June 8, 2011 and is a continuation of the video for "Party Rock Anthem". It emulates the movie Blade, specifically the rave bloodbath scene.

The video opens with a caption in the same style as "Party Rock Anthem", which explains that Redfoo and SkyBlu have become shuffling zombies and now travel downtown Transylvania "from dusk til dawn" in search of the perfect party. Redfoo and SkyBlu exit their vehicle in an empty car park and Redfoo opens out a map on the vehicle's hood. While arguing about their next destination, the shufflers are grabbed by an eccentric looking man, who pulls them behind the personalized Kia Soul. This time, they don't take it lightly and start to hit the stranger with the map. The "beating" soon ceases and the assailant is shown in full view. He recognizes the LMFAO crew, calling them the "shuffle guys". While the duo are justifying this nickname, the stranger appears to be day-dreaming yet focusing intensely on the shufflers. He invites them to a party, and after much persistence and also the promise of shots, LMFAO decide to attend this club.

The actual song begins, the video changes to the duo entering the club, and the viewer is shown that the guests are many of the original shufflers (including the Shuffle Bot and also Quest Crew – winners of America's Best Dance Crew, season 3) who are already busy party rocking. LMFAO join the dance-floor and the video alternates between shots of the dancers and shots of Natalia Kills. However, little do Redfoo and Sky Blu know that this party is hosted by a crew of blood-suckers who feast on their guests. This is made evident when one of the women bares her fangs and even more so when Redfoo cuts his finger while trying to open a champagne bottle – this grabs the attention of the vampires who begin to flirt with him. Natalia almost gets seduced by Redfoo, but then throws him to her vampires. The guys are oblivious to the attacking vampires and unknowingly manage to fight them off while dancing. However, they only realize the truth when the vampires form a demonic group behind them.

The next scene involves Redfoo, Sky Blu, the Shuffle Bot and Q running towards the exit. The door suddenly bursts open and WeHo Jesus (Kevin Short) strides in wearing Beats by Dr. Dre. He presents the group with crates filled with bottles of "Holy Champagne", and they use these drinks against the vampires, creating a huge champagne shower, referring to the song name. The music video ends with the dancers party rocking in victory and Jesus of Hollywood high-fiving the entire crew.

== Critical reception ==
Robert Copsey of Digital Spy UK gave the track 2 out of 5 stars, saying, "During our recent interview with LMFAO", the uncle-nephew duo not only described their new single as "the ultimate party song", but insisted that it would "change the way that people view champagne".

== Track listings ==
Digital download

1. "Champagne Showers" (featuring Natalia Kills) – 4:24
2. "Champagne Showers" (featuring Natalia Kills) [radio edit] – 3:58

Digital remixes

1. "Champagne Showers" (featuring Natalia Kills) [Sidney Samson Remix] – 5:34
2. "Champagne Showers" (featuring Natalia Kills) [Quintino Remix] – 6:00
3. "Champagne Showers" (featuring Natalia Kills) [EC Twins & Remy Le Duc Remix] – 4:20
4. "Champagne Showers" (featuring Natalia Kills) [Dimitri Vegas & Like Mike Tomorrowland Remix] – 4:38
5. "Champagne Showers" (featuring Natalia Kills) [Final DJs Remix] – 4:36
6. "Champagne Showers" (featuring Natalia Kills) [R3hab remix] – 4:48

== Charts and certifications ==
=== Weekly charts ===
Chart (2011)	Peak position
Australia (ARIA)	9
Australia Dance (ARIA)	2
Austria (Ö3 Austria Top 40)	18
Belgium (Ultratop 50 Flanders)	23
Belgium Dance (Ultratop Flanders)	9
Belgium Dance Bubbling Under (Ultratop Flanders)	4
Belgium (Ultratip Bubbling Under Wallonia)	32
Belgium Dance (Ultratop Wallonia)	7
Belgium Dance Bubbling Under (Ultratop Wallonia)	1
Canada Hot 100 (Billboard)	53
France (SNEP)	12
Germany (GfK)	41
Hungary (Dance Top 40)	34
Ireland (IRMA)	15
New Zealand (Recorded Music NZ)	8
Netherlands (Single Top 100)	81
Poland (Dance Top 50)	40
Slovakia Airplay (ČNS IFPI)	25
Scotland Singles (Official Charts)	28
Switzerland (Schweizer Hitparade)	56
UK Dance (Official Charts)	9
UK Singles (Official Charts)	32
US Hot Dance Club Songs (Billboard)	4

=== Year-end charts ===
Chart (2011)	Position
Australian Singles Chart	35
French Singles Chart	57
UK Singles Chart	190

=== Certifications ===
Region	Certification	Certified units/sales
Australia (ARIA)	3× Platinum	210,000^{^}
Canada (Music Canada)	Gold	40,000^{*}
Switzerland (IFPI Switzerland)	Gold	15,000^{^}
^{*} Sales figures based on certification alone.^{^} Shipments figures based on certification alone.

== Release history ==
Region	Date	Label	Format
Australia	27 May 2011	Interscope Records	Digital download
United Kingdom	27 May 2011	Interscope Records	Digital download
United Kingdom	22 July 2011	Interscope Records	Digital Remixes
