= LMFAO =

American musical duo (2006–2012)

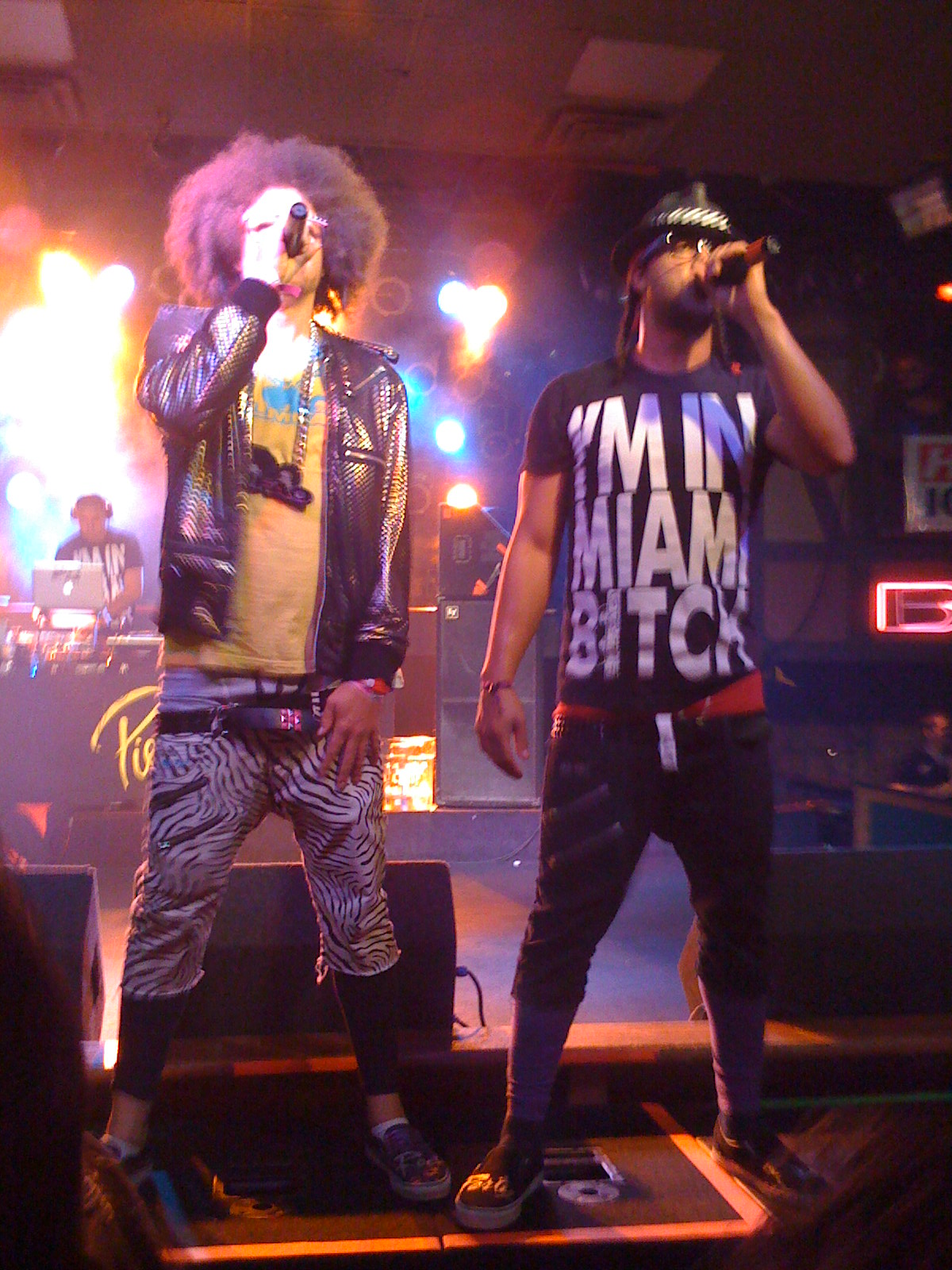
- LMFAO performing in Fort Wayne, Indiana in 2009

Background information
- Origin: Los Angeles, California, U.S.
- Genres: Electro hop; EDM; pop rap
- Years active: 2006–2012
- Labels: Cherrytree; will.i.am; Interscope
- Past members: Redfoo; Sky Blu

LMFAO (an initialism for Laughing My Freaking Ass Off) was an American electronic dance music duo consisting of Redfoo and Sky Blu. The duo are best known for their 2011 singles "Party Rock Anthem" (featuring Lauren Bennett and GoonRock) and "Sexy and I Know It", both of which peaked atop the Billboard Hot 100. They released two studio albums: Party Rock (2009) and Sorry for Party Rocking (2011), before disbanding in 2012; both albums were released on will.i.am Music Group, an imprint of Interscope Records.

Redfoo is the youngest son of Motown Records founder Berry Gordy and Nancy Leiviska. Sky Blu is Redfoo's half-nephew through his father, Berry Gordy IV, who in turn is the eldest son of Berry Gordy and his first wife Thelma Coleman. Redfoo and Sky Blu grew up in Pacific Palisades, Los Angeles, where they formed the group in 2006 and later became involved in the electro house scene.

The duo's 2008 debut single, "I'm in Miami Bitch", moderately entered both the Billboard Hot 100 and Canadian Hot 100. Its 2009 follow-ups, "La La La" and "Shots" (featuring Lil Jon), both entered the former chart and earned the duo further mainstream recognition. They also featured alongside Fergie on David Guetta and Chris Willis's 2010 single "Gettin' Over You", which peaked at number 1 on the UK Singles Chart and entered the top 40 of the Billboard Hot 100.

Their 2011 single "Party Rock Anthem" topped the charts in the United Kingdom, Australia, Belgium, Brazil, Canada, Denmark, France, Germany, Ireland, New Zealand, Switzerland, and the United States. The song was the third-best-selling digital single of that year, with sales of 9.7 million copies worldwide. In September 2012, the duo announced they would be taking an indefinite hiatus.

== History ==
=== 2006–2010: Early years and Party Rock ===
LMFAO began their career in 2006 as part of the electro house club scene in Los Angeles, which at the time featured DJ/producers like Steve Aoki and Adam Goldstein. The duo started building a local buzz through its shows and radio play. Once it had recorded some demos, Redfoo's best friend, will.i.am, introduced them to Interscope head Jimmy Iovine who gave the green light for them to be signed to Interscope/will.i.am Music. Interscope A&R and will.i.am manager Neil Jacobson told HitQuarters that the demos sounded like "finished records" and that so little artist development work was needed it was essentially a "turnkey operation" for the label. According to LMFAO, they were originally going to call themselves Sexy Dudes, but changed their name to LMFAO after telling SkyBlu's grandmother.

LMFAO released Party Rock EP on the iTunes music store on July 1, 2008, and released its full album on July 7, 2009. The album charted at number 33 on the Billboard 200 and number two on the U.S. Dance Chart. Los Angeles Times described Party Rock as "14 virtually interchangeable odes to night life." Its first single was "I'm in Miami Bitch", which was released in December 2008, and peaked at number 51 on the Billboard Hot 100 and number 37 in Canada. In early 2009, a little-known DJ/producer, 'DJ Inphinity', created a bootleg using the Silvio Ecomo remix of DJ Chuckie's 2008 hit "Let the Bass Kick" and the a cappella of LMFAO, creating "Bass Kick in Miami". The bootleg was spread across the internet and became a massive success at the Miami Winter Music Conference 2009. Weeks later, the song became the theme song for the E! television show Kourtney and Khloé Take Miami, and "Get Crazy" was used for the television show Jersey Shore in 2009. LMFAO were a featured storyline on MTV's The Real World: Cancun in August 2009, which covered the group's appearance in Cancun during 2009 Spring break. That same year, LMFAO was featured in The Crystal Method's song "Sine Language".

=== 2010–2012: International breakthrough, Sorry for Party Rocking, and Rockin' Eve ===
In 2010, LMFAO was featured in David Guetta's song "Gettin' Over You", which was an international hit, peaking in the top ten in eleven countries and at number one in three of them, including in the United Kingdom. It also peaked at number 31 on the U.S. Hot 100 and at number 12 in Canada.

The duo then recorded their second album, Sorry for Party Rocking, late in 2010 and released it on June 17, 2011, in the U.S. The first single taken from the album, "Party Rock Anthem", was released on January 25, 2011. It features British singer Lauren Bennett, formerly of the girl pop group Paradiso Girls, and producer GoonRock, and showcases the Melbourne Shuffle dance style in its popular video. The song is the most successful of their career, peaking at number one in the United States, Canada, the UK, and over ten other countries, as well being in the top ten in many others. In March 2011, LMFAO released their official music video "Party Rock Anthem" featuring Lauren Bennett and GoonRock, which has over 2 billion views on YouTube. The second single from Sorry for Party Rocking, "Champagne Showers", was released on May 27, 2011, and features English singer-songwriter Natalia Kills. The third single, "Sexy and I Know It", was released on October 3, 2011, and reached number one on the iTunes charts worldwide and number one on the Australian and Canadian Hot 100.

Also in 2011, LMFAO embarked on their first Asian tour. They performed in Singapore, Manila, Taipei, and Kuala Lumpur, among other cities. On June 30, 2011, LMFAO performed a set on the Isle of MTV 2011 Malta Special on the Fosos (Granaries) in Floriana, Malta, in front of a crowd of 50,000, together with Far East Movement and Snoop Dogg.

Furthermore, the group LMFAO focused on growing its Party Rock clothing line and was one of the opening acts for American singer Kesha's Get Sleazy Tour, along with Spank Rock and Natalia Kills, for the third and fifth legs of the tour in 2011. On August 13, 2011, it opened for Kesha at the St-Jean-sur-Richelieu hot air balloon festival in Quebec, Canada, attracting close to 100,000 fans.

On August 29, 2011, LMFAO filmed a video for its new single "Sexy and I Know It" in Venice Beach, California. Pornographic actor Ron Jeremy is featured in the video, which focuses thematically on male genitalia. Actors Simon Rex and Wilmer Valderrama, Andrew Furr (as Shufflebot) and mixed martial artist Alistair Overeem also make cameo appearances. The song achieved success similar to that of "Party Rock Anthem", topping charts all over the world. "Sexy and I Know It" became the duo's second number one in the US, Canada, Australia and New Zealand. The group guested on the first elimination show of the 13th series of Dancing with the Stars on September 20, 2011, which was broadcast live.

In October 2011, LMFAO's song "Party Rock Anthem" was used in a Halloween house light show when a Southern California man timed lights to the popular song. After the YouTube video of the house went viral, even receiving news coverage, the duo visited the house and recorded a Kia commercial featuring the house. In December 2011, the group played "Party Rock Anthem" on a live national television broadcast of Dick Clark's New Year's Rockin' Eve.

=== 2012–2015: Super Bowl XLVI, indefinite hiatus ===
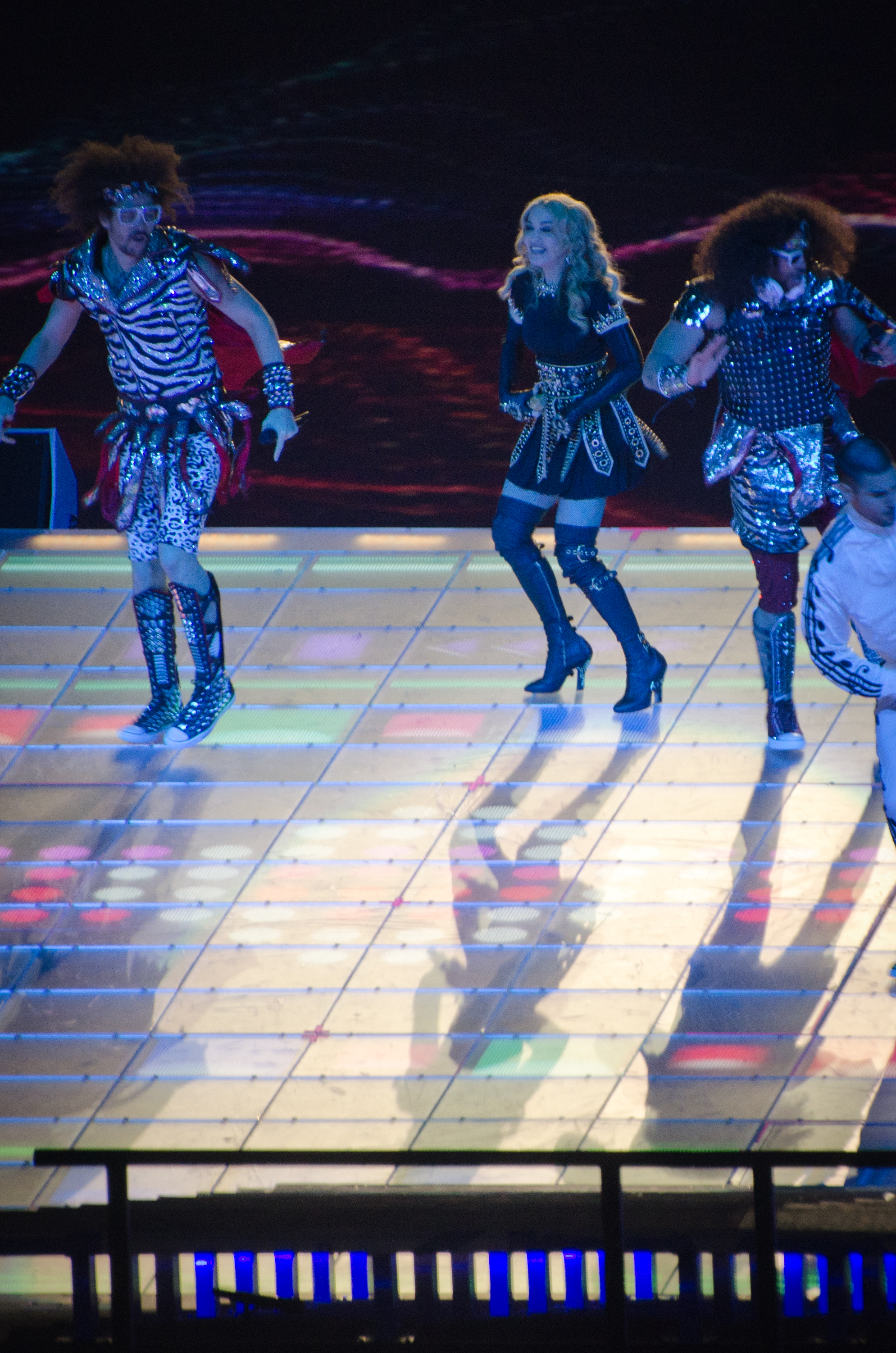
LMFAO performing with Madonna at Super Bowl XLVI's halftime show on February 5, 2012

On February 5, 2012, the group appeared with Madonna at Super Bowl XLVI during the Halftime Show. It performed during her song "Music", which contained a mash-up with "Party Rock Anthem" and "Sexy and I Know It". During the commercial break they also appeared in a Budweiser ad featuring their remix of Madonna's single "Give Me All Your Luvin'", which is included in the video game FIFA Street and on the deluxe edition of her album MDNA. Also, in 2012 Redfoo was sued by a previous management company for $7 million, claiming a breach of contract.

On September 21, 2012, the duo released a statement announcing their hiatus. Redfoo said, "I feel like we've been doing this for so long, four or five years" and that he and SkyBlu would not be performing together any time soon, as they would be taking their careers in different directions. Once the news surfaced that band members Redfoo and SkyBlu had split, the group went to MTV News to set the record straight. SkyBlu said, "Well, you know, first of all, we're not breaking up. I know that for sure. We're family and stuff, so it's always love ... It's interesting because somebody will say one thing [and] it's just like high school, then all of a sudden [it's] 'They're breaking up. They're fighting.'" However, it was revealed by SkyBlu that their plan is for fans to see the band as individuals and then come back "stronger than ever".

In 2015, the band alleged that Muskegon, Michigan-based Pigeon Hill Brewing Co.'s LMFAO Stout infringed on its trademarked name, according to a cease-and-desist letter sent on August 11. After weeks of litigation, the Pigeon Hill Brewing Company announced that both they and the band LMFAO had reached an agreement resulting in the brewery retaining its trademark for its LMFAO Stout.

== Influences ==
Redfoo cited Michael Jackson and Madonna as the group's two greatest influences. LMFAO is also influenced by a vast range of other artists, including rappers Tupac Shakur and Snoop Dogg; hip hop groups Black Eyed Peas, Run D.M.C. and the Wu-Tang Clan; R&B artist James Brown; and rock bands the Beatles, Led Zeppelin, and Steel Panther; and DJ AM, who helped introduce them to the electronic music scene. The Australian dance style the Melbourne Shuffle features heavily in the "Party Rock Anthem" music video, fused with US hip-hop dance elements. In 2007, LMFAO attended the Winter Music Conference in Miami, Florida, which the duo says was an experience that inspired their musical and creative style.

== Discography ==
=== Studio albums ===
- Party Rock (2009)
- Sorry for Party Rocking (2011)

=== Compilation albums ===
- I'm in Your City Trick (2009)

== Tours ==
=== Headlining ===
- Sorry for Party Rocking Tour (2012)

=== Opening act ===
- Kesha – Get Sleazy Tour (United Kingdom, North America—Leg 3 dates) (2011)

== Awards and nominations ==
Award	Year	Nominee(s)	Category	Result	Ref.
American Music Awards	2011	LMFAO	Favorite Pop/Rock Band/Duo/Group	Nominated	
Echo Music Prize	2012	LMFAO	Best International Newcomer	Nominated	
Echo Music Prize	2012	LMFAO	Best Club/Dance Act	Nominated	
Grammy Awards	2010	Party Rock	Best Dance/Electronic Album	Nominated	
Grammy Awards	2013	"Sexy And I Know It"	Best Pop Duo/Group Performance	Nominated	
International Dance Music Awards	2010	LMFAO	Best Artist (Group)	Nominated	
International Dance Music Awards	2010	Party Rock	Best Artist Album	Nominated	
International Dance Music Awards	2011	"Gettin' Over You"	Best Commercial Dance Track	Won	
International Dance Music Awards	2011	"Gettin' Over You"	Best Music Video	Won	
International Dance Music Awards	2012	"Party Rock Anthem"	Best Commercial/Pop Dance Track	Nominated	
International Dance Music Awards	2012	"Party Rock Anthem"	Best Music Video	Nominated	
International Dance Music Awards	2012	LMFAO	Best Artist (Group)	Nominated	
RTHK International Pop Poll Awards	2012	LMFAO	Top Group/Band	Bronze	
RTHK International Pop Poll Awards	2012	"Party Rock Anthem"	Top Ten International Gold Songs	Nominated	

Year	Award	Category	Work	Result
2011	Teen Choice Awards	Choice Summer Song	"Party Rock Anthem" featuring Lauren Bennett & GoonRock	Nominated
2011	Premios 40 Principales	Best International Song	"Party Rock Anthem"	Won
2011	MTV Video Music Awards	Best Choreography	"Party Rock Anthem" featuring Lauren Bennett & GoonRock	Nominated
2011	MTV European Music Awards	Best New	LMFAO	Nominated
2011	MTV European Music Awards	Best Push	LMFAO	Nominated
2012	People's Choice Awards	Favorite Song of the Year	"Party Rock Anthem" featuring Lauren Bennett & GoonRock	Nominated
2012	People's Choice Awards	Favorite Music Video of the Year	"Party Rock Anthem" featuring Lauren Bennett & GoonRock	Nominated
2012	NRJ Music Awards 2012	International Group/Duo of the Year	LMFAO	Won
2012	NRJ Music Awards 2012	Favourite Music Video of the Year	"Party Rock Anthem" featuring Lauren Bennett & GoonRock	Won
2012	2012 Kids' Choice Awards	Favorite Music Group	LMFAO	Nominated
2012	2012 Kids' Choice Awards	Favorite Song of the Year	"Party Rock Anthem" featuring Lauren Bennett & GoonRock	Won
2012	2012 Juno Awards	International Album of the Year	"Sorry for Party Rocking"	Nominated
2012	2012 Latin Billboard Music Awards	Crossover Artist of the Year	LMFAO	Won
2012	2012 Billboard Music Awards	Top 100 Song	"Party Rock Anthem" featuring Lauren Bennett & GoonRock	Won
2012	2012 Billboard Music Awards	Top Radio Song	"Party Rock Anthem" featuring Lauren Bennett & GoonRock	Nominated
2012	2012 Billboard Music Awards	Top Streaming Song	"Party Rock Anthem" featuring Lauren Bennett & GoonRock	Nominated
2012	2012 Billboard Music Awards	Top Digital Song	"Party Rock Anthem" featuring Lauren Bennett & GoonRock	Won
2012	2012 Billboard Music Awards	Top Pop Song	"Party Rock Anthem" featuring Lauren Bennett & GoonRock	Won
2012	2012 Billboard Music Awards	Top Rap Song	"Party Rock Anthem" featuring Lauren Bennett & GoonRock	Won
2012	2012 Billboard Music Awards	Top Dance Song	"Party Rock Anthem" featuring Lauren Bennett & GoonRock	Won
2012	2012 Billboard Music Awards	Top Digital Song	"Sexy and I Know It"	Nominated
2012	2012 Billboard Music Awards	Top Pop Song	"Sexy and I Know It"	Nominated
2012	2012 Billboard Music Awards	Top Rap Song	"Sexy and I Know It"	Nominated
2012	2012 Billboard Music Awards	Top Dance Song	"Sexy and I Know It"	Nominated
2012	2012 Billboard Music Awards	Best Group/Duo	"LMFAO"	Won
2012	MTV Movie Awards 2012	Best Music	"Party Rock Anthem" featuring Lauren Bennett & GoonRock "21 Jump Street"	Won
2012	2012 MuchMusic Video Awards	International Video of the Year	"Sexy and I Know It"	Won
2012	2012 MuchMusic Video Awards	Most Streamed Video of the Year	"Sexy and I Know It"	Nominated
2012	2012 MuchMusic Video Awards	International Artist	"LMFAO"	Nominated
2012	2012 MTV TRL Awards	Best Video	"Party Rock Anthem" featuring Lauren Bennett & GoonRock	Won
2012	MTV Video Music Awards Japan	Best New Artist	"Party Rock Anthem" featuring Lauren Bennett & GoonRock	Nominated
2012	MTV Video Music Awards Japan	Best Choreography	"Party Rock Anthem" featuring Lauren Bennett & GoonRock	Nominated
2012	VEVOCertified Awards	100.000.000 Views	"Party Rock Anthem"	Won
2012	VEVOCertified Awards	100.000.000 Views	"Sexy and I Know It"	Won
2012	VEVOCertified Awards	100.000.000 Views	"Sorry For Party Rocking"	Won
2012	VEVOCertified Awards	100.000.000 Views	"Shots"	Won
2012	VEVOCertified Awards	100.000.000 Views	"Champagne Showers"	Won
2012	Premios 40 Principales America	Best International Dance Artist	LMFAO	Won

== See also ==
- Gordy family
- The dictionary definition of LMFAO at Wiktionary
