= Lil Jon discography =

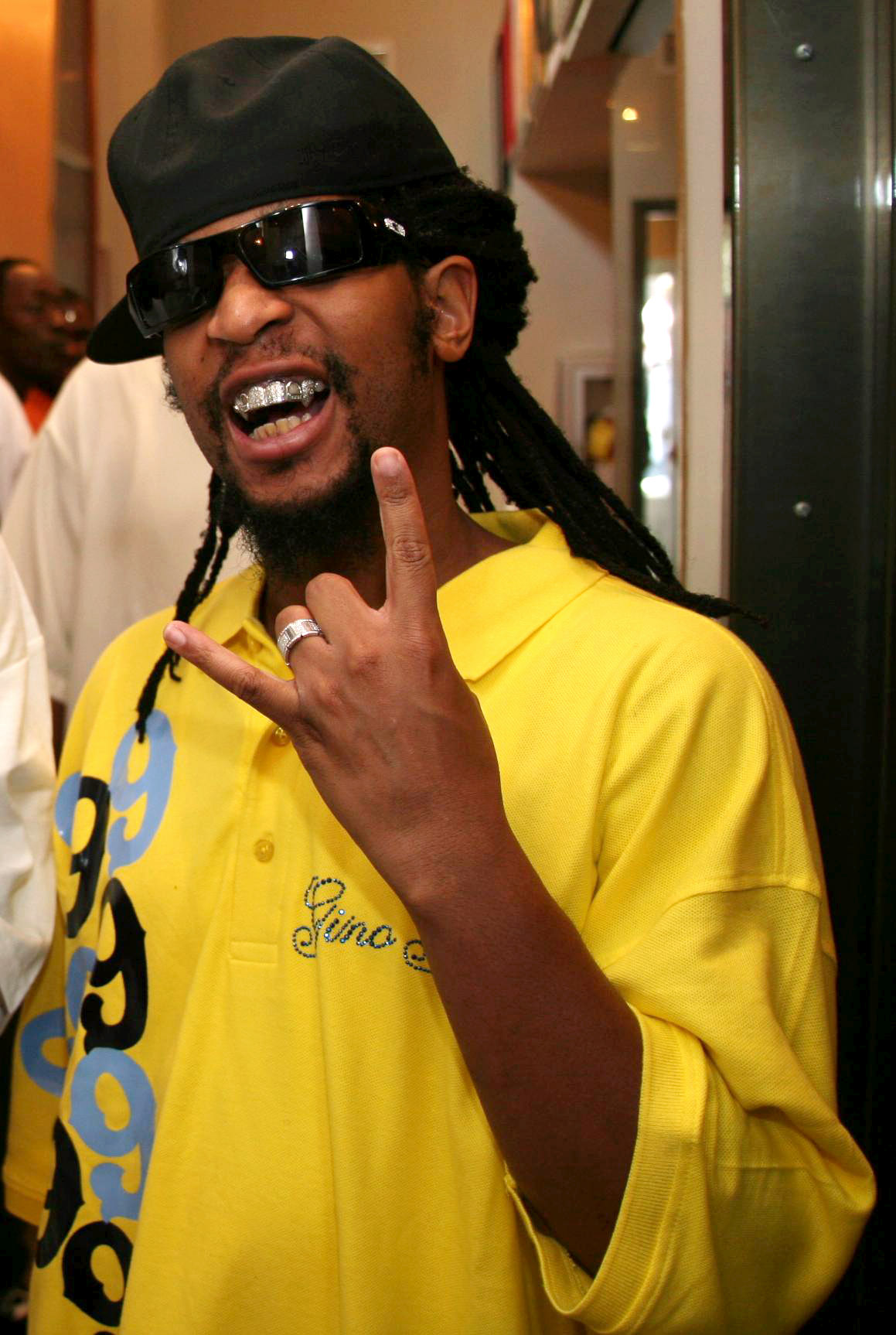
- Studio albums: 7
- Compilation albums: 1
- Singles: 15

The discography of American rapper Lil Jon consists of seven studio albums and fifteen singles. Lil Jon was the lead vocalist for the group Lil Jon & the East Side Boyz from 1997 to 2004. Since the group broke up, Lil Jon has continued to produce his own music and tracks for other artists.

In 1997, Lil Jon & the East Side Boyz debuted with Get Crunk, Who U Wit: Da Album. After releasing We Still Crunk!! in 2000, the group signed to TVT Records. Under TVT the group put out three albums: Put Yo Hood Up in 2001, Kings of Crunk in 2002, and Crunk Juice in 2004. Two collaborative singles with the Ying Yang Twins, "Get Low" and "Salt Shaker", made the top ten of the US Billboard Hot 100 chart in 2003 and 2004 respectively. Lil Jon & the East Side Boyz disbanded after Crunk Juice, but Lil Jon continued his music career with many produced hit singles such as "Girlfight" by Brooke Valentine, "The Anthem" by Pitbull, and "Do You Remember" by Jay Sean. Lil Jon began recording his solo debut album, Crunk Rock, in 2006, and "Snap Yo Fingers" (featuring E-40 and Sean P) was the debut single for that album. Many delays led it to be released in 2010.

== Albums ==
=== Studio albums ===
Title	Details	Peak chart positions					Certifications (sales threshold)
Title	Details	US	US R&B	US Rap	US Indie	AUS	Certifications (sales threshold)
Get Crunk, Who U Wit: Da Album (with The East Side Boyz)	Release date: October 21, 1997; Label: Mirror Image/Ichiban; Formats: CD, cassette	—	—	—	—	—	
We Still Crunk! (with The East Side Boyz)	Release date: August 15, 2000; Label: BME; Formats: CD, cassette	—	71	—	—	—	
Put Yo Hood Up (with The East Side Boyz)	Release date: May 22, 2001; Label: BME, TVT; Formats: CD, cassette, LP	43	6	—	1	—	RIAA: Gold
Kings of Crunk (with The East Side Boyz)	Release date: October 29, 2002; Label: BME, TVT; Formats: CD, digital download	14	2	—	1	93	RIAA: 2× Platinum
Crunk Juice (with The East Side Boyz)	Release date: November 16, 2004; Label: BME, TVT; Formats: CD, digital download	3	2	1	1	81	RIAA: 2× Platinum
Crunk Rock	Release date: June 8, 2010; Label: BME, Universal Republic; Formats: CD, digital download	49	8	5	—	—	
"—" denotes a recording that did not chart or was not released in that territory.

=== Compilation albums ===
Title	Details	Peak chart positions		
Title	Details	US	US R&B	US Indie
Certified Crunk	Released: November 4, 2003; Label: Ichiban, Ryko (1037); Format: CD	197	40	9

=== Soundtrack appearances and/or production ===
- 1999 - The Wood: Music from the Motion Picture
- 2000 - Big Momma's House Soundtrack
- 2002 - Love and a Bullet Soundtrack
- 2002 - Barbershop 2: Back In Business Soundtrack
- 2005 - XXX: State of the Union Soundtrack
- 2005 - Hustle & Flow Motion Picture Soundtrack
- 2005 - MTV VMA Score 2005 (with Mike Shinoda)
- 2009 - Fast & Furious: Original Motion Picture Soundtrack
- 2009 - The Hangover: Original Motion Picture Soundtrack
- 2012 - Step Up Revolution: Music From The Motion Picture
- 2013 - Turbo: Music from the Motion Picture Soundtrack
- 2015 - We Are Your Friends: Original Motion Picture Soundtrack
- 2015 - Alvin and the Chipmunks: The Road Chip: Original Motion Picture Soundtrack
- 2015 - Furious 7: Original Motion Picture Soundtrack
- 2016 - Office Christmas Party: Motion Picture Soundtrack
- 2018 - Superfly: Music from the Motion Picture
- 2020 - Bad Boys for Life (The Soundtrack) (with Pitbull)

== Extended plays ==
Title	Details
Part II (with The East Side Boyz)	Released: November 25, 2003; Label: TVT; Formats: Digital download

== Singles ==
=== As lead artist ===
List of singles as lead artist, with selected chart positions and certifications, showing year released and album name
Title	Year	Peak chart positions								Certifications	Album
Title	Year	US	US R&B	US Rap	AUS	CAN	NZ	SWI	UK	Certifications	Album
"Who You Wit?" (with The East Side Boyz)	1997	—	70	—	—	—	—	—	—		Get Crunk, Who You Wit: Da Album
"Shawty Freak a Lil' Sumtin'" (with The East Side Boyz featuring Disco Rick)	1998	— (Note: "Shawty Freak a Lil' Sumtin'" did not enter the Billboard Hot 100, but peaked at number 19 on the Bubbling Under Hot 100 chart.)	62	32	—	—	—	—	—		Get Crunk, Who You Wit: Da Album
"I Like Dem Girlz" (with The East Side Boyz)	2000	—	55	3	—	—	—	—	—		We Still Crunk!!
"Bia' Bia'" (with The East Side Boyz featuring Ludacris, Too $hort, Big Kap and Chyna Whyte)	2001	94	47	—	—	—	—	—	—		Put Yo Hood Up
"Put Yo Hood Up" (with The East Side Boyz)	2001	—	80	—	—	—	—	—	—		Put Yo Hood Up
"I Don't Give a Fuck" (with The East Side Boyz featuring Mystikal and Krayzie Bone)	2002	—	50	—	—	—	—	—	—		Kings of Crunk
"Get Low"^{[A]} (with The East Side Boyz featuring Ying Yang Twins)	2003	2	2	1	23	—	28	44	10	BPI: Platinum; RMNZ: 2× Platinum	Kings of Crunk
"What U Gon' Do"^{[A]} (with The East Side Boyz featuring Lil Scrappy)	2004	22	18	8	—	—	—	—	38		Crunk Juice
"Lovers and Friends"^{[A]} (with The East Side Boyz featuring Usher and Ludacris)	2004	3	2	1	36	—	15	44	10	RMNZ: Platinum	Crunk Juice
"Get Crunk" (with The East Side Boyz featuring Bo Hagon)	2004	—	59	—	—	—	—	—	—		Crunk Juice
"Real Nigga Roll Call"^{[A]} (with The East Side Boyz featuring Ice Cube)	2004	—	61	—	—	—	—	—	38		Crunk Juice
"Snap Yo Fingers" (featuring E-40 and Sean P)	2006	7	1	1	57	—	14	—	159	RIAA: Platinum; RMNZ: Platinum	Non-album singles
"Act a Fool" (featuring Three 6 Mafia)	2006	—	91	—	—	—	—	—	—		Non-album singles
"I Do" (featuring Snoop Dogg and Swizz Beatz)	2009	—	—	—	—	—	—	—	—		Non-album singles
"Give It All U Got" (featuring Kee and Tinchy Stryder)	2009	—	—	—	—	90	—	—	—		Non-album singles
"Ms. Chocolate" (featuring R. Kelly and Mario)	2010	—	77	—	—	—	—	—	—		Crunk Rock
"Hey" (featuring 3OH!3)	2010	62	—	—	—	48	—	—	—		Crunk Rock
"Machuka" (featuring Mr. Catra and Mulher Filé)	2010	—	—	—	—	—	—	—	—		Crunk Rock
"Mutate" (with Sidney Samson)	2011	—	—	—	—	—	—	—	—		Non-album singles
"Drink" (featuring LMFAO)	2012	— (Note: "Drink" did not enter the Billboard Hot 100, but peaked at number 2 on the Bubbling Under Hot 100 Singles chart.)	101	—	42	—	—	—	—		Non-album singles
"Turn Down for What" (with DJ Snake)	2013	4	30	—	13	17	10	36	23	RIAA: 8× Platinum; BPI: Platinum; ARIA: 2× Platinum; MC: 6× Platinum; GLF: Platinum; RMNZ: 2× Platinum; FIMI: Platinum	Non-album singles
"Bend Ova" (featuring Tyga)	2014	92	—	19	48	53	40	—	—		Non-album singles
"My Cutie Pie" (featuring T-Pain, Snoop Dogg and Problem)	2015	—	—	—	—	—	—	—	—		Non-album singles
"Get Loose"	2015	—	—	—	—	—	—	—	—		Non-album singles
"GFU" (with Hidrro featuring Sue Cho and DMX)	2016	—	—	—	—	—	—	—	—		Non-album singles
"Take It Off" (featuring Yandel and Becky G)	2016	—	—	—	—	—	—	—	—		Non-album singles
"Work"	2017	—	—	—	—	—	—	—	—		Non-album singles
"In the Pit" (featuring Skellism and Terror Bass)	2017	—	—	—	—	—	—	—	—		Non-album singles
"Alive" (featuring Offset and 2 Chainz)	2018	—	—	—	—	—	—	—	—		Non-album singles
"All I Really Want For Christmas" (featuring Kool-Aid Man)	2018	—	—	—	—	—	—	—	—		Non-album singles
"Bang" (with Nghtmre and Shaq)	2019	—	—	—	—	—	—	—	—		Non-album singles
"Fuccboi"	2019	—	—	—	—	—	—	—	—		Non-album singles
"Mutate (2k19 Festival Mix)" (with Sidney Samson)	2019	—	—	—	—	—	—	—	—		Non-album singles
"Ain't No Tellin'" (with Mac Dre)	2019	—	—	—	—	—	—	—	—		Non-album singles
"Oxy" (with Big Ali and R-Wan)	2019	—	—	—	—	—	—	—	—		Non-album singles
"What We On" (with E-40, P-Lo and Da Boii)	2023	—	—	—	—	—	—	—	—		Non-album singles
"Damn I Love Miami" (with Pitbull)	2025	76	—	—	—	86	—	—	—		Bad Boys for Life and Pitcoin
"Satalanaaa" (with Pitbull)	2026	—	—	—	—	—	—	—	—		Pitcoin
"—" denotes a recording that did not chart or was not released in that territory.

- A. In the UK "Real Nigga Roll Call" charted as "Roll Call" together with "What U Gon' Do" and "Lovers & Friends" together with "Get Low" as two separate double A-side singles.

=== As featured artist ===
List of singles as featured artist, with selected chart positions and certifications, showing year released and album name
Title	Year	Peak chart positions										Certifications	Album
Title	Year	US	US R&B	AUS	CAN	GER	IRL	NLD	NZ	SWI	UK	Certifications	Album
"Damn!" (YoungBloodZ featuring Lil Jon)	2003	4	2	—	—	—	—	—	—	—	—	RIAA: Gold	Drankin' Patnaz
"Salt Shaker" (Ying Yang Twins featuring Lil Jon & the East Side Boyz)	2003	9	9	75	—	87	—	—	—	—	—		Me & My Brother
"Shake That Monkey" (Too Short featuring Lil Jon & the East Side Boyz)	2003	84	56	—	—	—	—	—	—	—	—		Married to the Game
"Head Bussa" (Lil Scrappy featuring Lil Jon)	2003	—	73	—	—	—	—	—	—	—	—		Trillville & Lil Scrappy
"Neva Eva" (Trillville featuring Lil Jon and Lil Scrappy)	2003	78	28	—	—	—	—	—	—	—	—		Trillville & Lil Scrappy
"Quick to Back Down" (Bravehearts featuring Nas and Lil Jon)	2003	—	48	—	—	—	—	—	—	—	—		Bravehearted
"Come Get Some" (TLC featuring Lil Jon and Sean P)	2003	—	81	—	—	—	—	—	—	—	—		Now and Forever: The Hits
"Yeah!" (Usher featuring Lil Jon and Ludacris)	2004	1	1	1	1	1	1	1	1	1	1	RIAA: 13× Platinum; ARIA: 9× Platinum; BPI: 3× Platinum; BVMI: 2× Platinum; IFPI SWI: Gold; MC: Platinum; RMNZ: 6× Platinum; RIAJ: Gold	Confessions
"Culo" (Pitbull featuring Lil Jon)	2004	32	45	—	—	—	—	—	—	—	—		M.I.A.M.I.
"Real Gangstaz" (Mobb Deep featuring Lil Jon)	2004	—	49	—	—	—	—	—	—	—	—		Amerikaz Nightmare
"Let's Go" (Trick Daddy featuring Twista and Lil Jon)	2004	7	10	35	—	—	27	—	—	—	26	RIAA: Gold	Thug Matrimony: Married to the Streets
"Okay" (Nivea featuring Lil Jon and YoungBloodZ)	2004	40	14	—	—	—	—	—	28	—	—		Complicated
"That's Nasty" (Pitbull featuring Lil Jon, Fat Joe and Lil Scrappy)	2004	—	—	—	—	—	—	—	—	—	—		M.I.A.M.I.
"Girlfight" (Brooke Valentine featuring Big Boi and Lil Jon)	2005	23	13	50	—	70	47	—	28	61	35		Chain Letter
"Toma" (Pitbull featuring Lil Jon)	2005	— (Note: "Toma" did not enter the Billboard Hot 100, but peaked at number 8 on the Bubbling Under Hot 100 Singles chart.)	73	—	—	—	—	—	—	—	—		M.I.A.M.I.
"Go to Church" (Ice Cube featuring Snoop Dogg and Lil Jon)	2006	— (Note: "Go to Church" did not enter the Billboard Hot 100, but peaked at number 21 on the Bubbling Under Hot 100 Singles chart.)	67	—	—	—	—	—	—	—	—		Laugh Now, Cry Later
"Get Buck in Here" (DJ Felli Fel featuring Diddy, Akon, Ludacris and Lil Jon)	2007	41	27	—	58	—	—	—	—	—	—	RIAA: Gold	Non-album single
"The Anthem" (Pitbull featuring Lil Jon)	2007	38	—	—	—	72	—	—	—	64	—		The Boatlift
"Krazy" (Pitbull featuring Lil Jon)	2008	30	101	—	70	—	—	—	—	59	—	RIAA: Gold	Rebelution and Fast & Furious
"Shots" (LMFAO featuring Lil Jon)	2009	68	—	75	53	—	—	—	—	—	—	RIAA: 2× Platinum; ARIA: 2× Platinum; MC: Platinum; RMNZ: Platinum	Party Rock
"Patron Tequila" (Paradiso Girls featuring Lil Jon and Eve)	2009	—	—	—	82	—	—	—	—	—	—		Non-album single
"Do You Remember" (Jay Sean featuring Sean Paul and Lil Jon)	2009	10	—	7	11	—	23	—	11	—	13	RIAA: Platinum; ARIA: Platinum; BPI: Platinum; RMNZ: Platinum	All or Nothing
"Twisted" (Gorilla Zoe featuring Lil Jon)	2011	77	63	—	—	—	—	—	—	—	—		King Kong
"Turbulence" (Laidback Luke and Steve Aoki featuring Lil Jon)	2011	—	—	37	—	—	—	—	—	—	66		Non-album single
"Hard White (Up in the Club)" (Yelawolf featuring Lil Jon)	2011	—	114	—	—	—	—	—	—	—	—		Radioactive
"Literally I Can't" (Play-N-Skillz featuring Redfoo, Lil Jon and Enertia McFly)	2014	—	—	—	—	—	—	—	—	—	—		Non-album singles
"SexBeat" (Usher featuring Lil Jon and Ludacris)	2020	—	—	—	—	—	—	—	—	—	—		Non-album singles
"Jumpin" (Pitbull featuring Lil Jon)	2023	—	44	—	—	—	—	—	—	—	—		Trackhouse
"—" denotes a recording that did not chart or was not released in that territory.

=== Promotional singles ===
List of promotional singles, with selected chart positions, showing year released and album name
Title	Year	Peak chart positions	Album
Title	Year	US Bub.	Album
"Let Me See the Booty" (The-Dream featuring Lil Jon)	2008	—	Love vs. Money
"Jizzle" (Young Jeezy featuring Lil Jon)	2010	16	Non-album single
"Set the Roof" (Rae Sremmurd featuring Lil Jon)	2016	—	SremmLife 2
"Cinco de Mayo" (with Pitbull featuring Chesca)	2020	—	Libertad 548
"—" denotes a recording that did not chart or was not released in that territory.

== Other charted songs ==
List of songs, with selected chart positions, showing year released and album name
Title	Year	Peak chart positions			Album
Title	Year	US	US R&B	AUS	Album
"Nothin's Free" (with the East Side Boyz featuring Oobie)	2002	—	61	—	Put Yo Hood Up and Kings of Crunk
"Rep Your City" (E-40 featuring Petey Pablo, Bun B, 8Ball and Lil Jon & The East Side Boyz)	2002	—	73	—	Grit & Grind
"Play No Games" (with the East Side Boyz featuring Fat Joe, Trick Daddy and Oobie)	2003	—	—	—	Kings of Crunk
"In the Club" (with the East Side Boyz featuring R. Kelly and Ludacris)	2004	—	—	—	Crunk Juice
"Outta Your Mind" (featuring LMFAO)	2010	84	—	92	Crunk Rock
"—" denotes releases that did not chart or receive certification.

== Guest appearances ==
List of non-single guest appearances, with other performing artists, showing year released and album name
Title	Year	Other artist(s)	Album
"Last Call"	2003	Outkast, Slimm Calhoun	Speakerboxxx/The Love Below
"305 Anthem"	2004	Pitbull	M.I.A.M.I.
"Culo" (Miami Mix)	2004	Pitbull, Mr. Vegas	M.I.A.M.I.
"1800"	2009	Snoop Dogg	Malice N Wonderland
"Prima Donna" (Uncredited)	2010	Christina Aguilera	Bionic
"How Many Girls"	2010	Jamie Drastik	The Magnet
"Can't Be Tamed" (Rockangeles Remix)	2010	Miley Cyrus	Can't Be Tamed
"Watagatapitusberry"	2010	Pitbull, Sensato del Patio, Black Point, El Cata	Armando
"Go Ape"	2010	Far East Movement, Colette Carr	Free Wired
"I Wanna Get Drunk"	2010	DJ Felli Fel, Three 6 Mafia, Fatman Scoop	none
"Let's Go"	2011	Travis Barker, Yelawolf, Twista, Busta Rhymes	Give the Drummer Some
"Stunt"	2011	OJ da Juiceman, Rocko	Culinary Art School 2
"You Had Me from Hell No"	2011	John Rich	Rich Rocks
"Twisted"	2011	Gorilla Zoe	King Kong
"Emergency"	2012	Steve Aoki, Chiddy Bang	Wonderland
"It's Your Birthday B!#ch"	2012	DJ Felli Fel, Jessie Malakouti	none
"Let's Go (Ricky Luna Remix)	2012	Travis Barker, Busta Rhymes, Twista, Yelawolf	Step Up Revolution
"U Don't Like Me" (Datsik Remix)	2012	Diplo	Step Up Revolution
"Goin' In"	2012	Jennifer Lopez, Flo Rida	Step Up Revolution
"It's My Party"	2012	Roscoe Dash, MGK	2.0
"Lace Up"	2012	MGK	Lace Up
"Madness"	2013	Dimitri Vegas & Like Mike, Coone	none
"Before I Pass Out"	2013	Darin	Exit
"Electric Vodka"	2013	DJ Hidrro, Mandy Edge	none
"Welcome to the Jungle"	2013	Alvaro, Mercer	none
"Andale"	2014	Problem	O.T (Outta Town)
"Middle Finger (Down Low)"	2014	DJ Hidrro	Down Low EP
"The Weekend"	2015	Eden xo	none
"Calentura Trap Edition"	2015	Yandel	Dangerous
"#GFU"	2016	DJ Hidrro, Sue Cho	none
"Set the Roof"	2016	Rae Sremmurd	SremmLife 2
"Locas"	2017	Pitbull	Greatest Hits
"Temporary Lover"	2019	Chris Brown	Indigo
"Damn I Love Miami"	2020	Pitbull	Bad Boys for Life
"Bia Bia"	2020	Bia	For Certain
"Take a Shot and Make a TikTok"	2020	Nategawd, Flo Rida	none
"Call Me Back"	2026	Kehlani, T-Pain	Kehlani

== See also ==
- Lil Jon production discography
