= We Still Crunk!! =

Studio album by Lil Jon & the East Side Boyz
- Released: August 15, 2000
- Recorded: 1999–2000
- Studio: The Zone (Atlanta, GA); Blue Basement Recordings (Atlanta, GA); Dangerous Music (Atlanta, GA)
- Genre: Southern hip hop; bass music; crunk
- Label: BME
- Producer: Emperor Searcy; Lil' Jon; Oomp Camp Foundation

Lil Jon & the East Side Boyz chronology
Get Crunk, Who U Wit: Da Album (1997)	We Still Crunk!! (2000)	Put Yo Hood Up (2001)

Singles from We Still Crunk!!
- 1. "Just a Bitch/I Like Dem" Released: March 7, 2000

Professional ratings
Review scores
Source	Rating
AllMusic	2.5/5 stars

We Still Crunk!! is the second studio album by American Southern hip hop group Lil Jon & the East Side Boyz. It was released on August 15, 2000, through BME Recordings. The recording sessions took place at The Zone, Blue Basement Recordings and Dangerous Music in Atlanta. The album was produced by Lil' Jon, Emperor Searcy, and Oomp Camp Foundation. It features guest appearances from Chyna Whyte, Too $hort, Bohagon, 6 Shot, Don Yute, Khujo, Lyrical Giants, Oobie, Quint Black, Skyy, the Nation Riders, Three 6 Mafia, YoungBloodZ, Jazze Pha, and Vince "VP" Phillips, with cameo appearances from Carolyn, Convict, Sir Yay, Sonya & the Eastside Girlz.

The album did not make it to the Billboard 200, however, it reached number 71 on the Top R&B/Hip-Hop Albums and number 44 on the Independent Albums charts in the United States. The single "I Like Dem Girlz" peaked at No. 55 on the Hot R&B/Hip-Hop Songs and No. 3 on the Hot Rap Songs.

== Track listing ==
No.	Title	Writer(s)	Producer(s)	Length
1.	"We Still Crunk!!" (featuring Sonya & The Eastside Girlz, Sir Yay, and Convict)	Jonathan Smith; Sam Norris; Wendell Neal	Lil' Jon	1:55
2.	"I Like Dem Girlz" (featuring Jazze Pha)	Smith; Norris; Neal	Lil' Jon	4:30
3.	"Where Dem Girlz At?" (featuring Skyy, Chyna Whyte, and Carolyn)	Smith; Norris; Skyler Synclair Keeton	Lil' Jon	4:00
4.	"Bounce Dat Ass" (featuring Chyna Whyte and 6 Shot)	Smith; Norris; Neal; Stephanie Lewis; Jermaine Tucker	Lil' Jon	4:13
5.	"Nothins Free" (featuring Oobie)	Smith; Norris; Neal; Oobie Baby	Lil' Jon	4:28
6.	"Let My Nuts Go" (featuring Too $hort, Quint Black, and the Nation Riders)	Smith; Norris; Neal; Todd Shaw; Quinton Banks; Nation Riders	Lil' Jon	4:48
7.	"Just a Bitch" (featuring Too $hort and Chyna Whyte)	Smith; Norris; Neal; Shaw; Lewis	Lil' Jon	4:40
8.	"Du Maurier" (featuring VP)	Smith; Vince Phillips	Lil' Jon	0:29
9.	"Take Em Out" (featuring Roosta)	Smith; Norris; Neal	Oomp Camp Foundation	4:36
10.	"Uhh Ohhh" (featuring Khujo)	Smith; Norris; Neal; Willie Knighton; Cedric Leonard	Lil' Jon	5:10
11.	"Put Yo Hood Up"	Smith; Norris; Neal	Lil' Jon	5:09
12.	"Move Bitch" (featuring Three 6 Mafia, YoungBloodZ, Chyna Whyte, and Don Yute)	Smith; Norris; Neal; Ricky Dunigan; Lola Mitchell; Jordan Houston; Paul Beauregard; Sean Paul Joseph; Jeffrey Grigsby; Lewis; Jason Williams	Lil' Jon	5:29
13.	"Fuck Security" (featuring Lyrical Giants and Bohagon)	Smith; Norris; Neal; Vita Brinson; Wayne Hardnett; Jerrelle Anderson; Leonard	Lil' Jon	5:56
14.	"Shut Down" (featuring Paine, Loko, Intoxicated, Chyna Whyte, Major Payne, Bizar, and Roosta)	Smith; Norris; Neal	Emperor Searcy	7:18
15.	"I Like Dem Girlz (Remix)" (featuring Too $hort, Chyna Whyte, and Jazze Pha)	Smith; Norris; Neal; Shaw; Lewis	Lil' Jon	4:36
16.	"It Ain't Over"	Smith	Lil' Jon	0:36
17.	"We Don't Need That" (featuring Bohagon)	Smith; Norris; Neal; Leonard	Lil' Jon	4:34

Notes

- Tracks "Nothins Free" and "Just a Bitch" were removed on the second pressing of the album and replaced with "Bia' Bia'" and "Bia' Bia' Remix"
- "Nothins Free" is an alternate version of the song of the same name that appears on Put Yo Hood Up and Kings of Crunk
- "Just a Bitch" is an alternate version of "Bia' Bia'"

Sample credits

- Tracks 2 and 15 contains an interpolation of "Set It Off" as performed by Strafe
- Track 3 contains an interpolation of "Talking Out the Side of Your Neck" as performed by Cameo
- Track 5 contains an interpolation of "Let's Wait Awhile" as performed by Janet Jackson

== Personnel ==
Lil' Jon & The East Side Boyz

- Jonathan "Lil Jon" Smith – vocals, producer (tracks: 1–8, 10–13, 15–17), executive producer, A&R
- "Big Sam" Norris – vocals
- Wendell "Lil' Bo" Neal – vocals

Vocalists

- Sonya & The Eastside Girlz – backing vocals (track 1)
- Sir Yay – backing vocals (track 1)
- Convict – backing vocals (track 1)
- Phalon "Jazze Pha" Alexander – additional vocals (tracks: 2, 15)
- Skyler Synclair "Skyy" Keeton – vocals (track 3)
- Stephanie "Chyna Whyte" Lewis – additional vocals (track 3), vocals (tracks: 4, 7, 12, 14, 15)
- Carolyn – additional vocals (track 3)
- Jermaine "6 Shot" Tucker – vocals (track 4)
- Oobie – vocals (track 5)
- Todd "Too $hort" Shaw – vocals (tracks: 6, 7, 15)
- Quinton "Quint Black" Banks – vocals (track 6)
- The Nation Riders – vocals (track 6)
- Vince "VP" Phillips – vocals (track 8), executive producer
- Roosta – additional vocals (track 9), vocals (track 14)
- Willie "Khujo Goodie" Knighton – vocals (track 10)
- Cedric "Bo Hagon" Leonard – vocals (tracks: 10, 13, 17)
- Ricky "Lord Infamous" Dunigan – vocals (track 12)
- Lola "Gangsta Boo" Mitchell – vocals (track 12)
- Jordan "Juicy J" Houston – vocals (track 12)
- Paul "DJ Paul" Beauregard – vocals (track 12)
- Sean Paul Joseph – vocals (track 12)
- Jeffrey "J-Bo" Grigsby – vocals (track 12)
- Jason "Don Yute" Williams – vocals (track 12)
- Vita "Bizar" Brinson – vocals (tracks: 13, 14)
- Wayne "Bonecrusher" Hardnett – vocals (track 13)
- Jerrelle "Baby B." Anderson – vocals (track 13)
- Paine – vocals (track 14)
- Loko – vocals (track 14)
- Shawty Beezlee – vocals (track 14)
- B Real – vocals (track 14)
- Major Payne – vocals (track 14)

Musicians

- James "LRoc" Phillips – keyboards (tracks: 2–7, 13)
- Craig Love – guitar (tracks: 2, 15)
- Montay "DJ Montae" Humphrey – scratches (track 9)

Technicals

- Oomp Camp Foundation – producers (track 9)
- Dwayne "Emperor" Searcy – producer (track 14), executive producer
- William "Billy Hume" Whedbee – recording (tracks: 1–3, 5, 7–14, 16, 17), mixing (tracks: 1–3, 5, 7–17)
- Robin Mays – recording (tracks: 2, 4, 5, 6, 12, 13, 15)
- Don "DJ Snake" Brown – mixing (tracks: 2, 4, 7, 15), recording (tracks: 6, 7)
- Alex Lowe – mixing (tracks: 6, 13)
- Taj Tilghman – recording (track 12)
- Glenn Schick – mastering
- Robert "R.O.B." McDowell – executive producer
- LaTanya Davis – art direction
- Ben Brown – photography

== Charts ==
Chart (2000)	Peak position
US Top R&B/Hip-Hop Albums (Billboard)	71
US Independent Albums (Billboard)	44
