= Love and a Bullet =

- Theatrical release poster
- Directed by: Ben Ramsey; Kantz
- Written by: Ben Ramsey; Kantz
- Produced by: Nancy Norman
- Starring: Treach; Kent Masters King; Shireen Crutchfield; Walter Jones; Freez Luv; Charles Guardino; Sam Scarber
- Cinematography: Keith Smith
- Edited by: Christopher Koefoed
- Music by: Tyler Bates
- Distributed by: TriStar Pictures
- Release date: August 30, 2002
- Running time: 105 minutes
- Country: United States
- Language: English
- Budget: $7-13 million
- Box office: $40 million

Love and a Bullet is a 2002 action film starring American rapper Treach of Naughty by Nature. It was released to theaters on August 30, 2002 by TriStar Pictures and was directed by Ben Ramsey and Kantz.

== Plot ==
While staking out his next assignment, the innocent girlfriend of his notorious boss, contract killer Malik (Treach) reflects on the dark path he's chosen but cannot escape. Torn between his sense of duty and his newfound sense of humanity, he finds that the only way out is a perilous showdown with men who are every bit as cold-blooded as he is.

== Cast ==
- Treach as Malik Bishop
- Kent Masters King as Cynda Griffie
- Charles Guardino as Damien Wiles
- Shireen Crutchfield as Hylene
- Sam Scarber as Buddy
- Walter Jones as Cisco
- James Black as Vaughn
- Derek Mears as The Milkman
- Freez Luv as Frenchy

== Box office ==
Love and a Bullet was only released in 14 theaters and was only shown for three weeks. In its limited release, Love and a Bullet grossed $18,926.

== Soundtrack ==
Music from and Inspired by the Motion Picture Love and a Bullet

Soundtrack album by various artists
- Released: June 11, 2002
- Genre: Hip hop
- Length: 54:02
- Label: TVT Soundtrax

Singles from Music from and Inspired by the Motion Picture Love and a Bullet
- 1. "Give It to Her" Released: 2002; 2. "Holla at a Playa" Released: 2002

Professional ratings
Review scores
Source	Rating
AllMusic	3/5 stars

Music from and Inspired by the Motion Picture Love and a Bullet was released on June 11, 2002 through TVT Soundtrax and consisted entirely of hip hop music. The album itself did not make it to any Billboard charts, however, Jim Crow's single "Holla at a Playa" peaked at No. 97 on the Hot R&B/Hip-Hop Songs.

=== Track listing ===
No.	Title	Writer(s)	Length
1.	"Rah Rah" (performed by Naughty by Nature and Rottin Razkals)	Anthony Shawn Criss; Vincent E. Brown; Abdullah Barr; Jeffrey Ray; Keith Watts; Bernard Griffin	3:59
2.	"Sound Off" (performed by Ying Yang Twins)	D'eongelo Holmes; Eric Jackson; Michael Crooms	4:26
3.	"Payback" (performed by Techniec)	David Williams III; Rashad Coes	3:29
4.	"The Unexxpected" (performed by Sixx John)	S. Johnson; Derryck Thornton	3:52
5.	"Let's Go" (performed by Mr. Cheeks)	Terrance Kelly; Ralphy Salas; Thomas Weisman	3:50
6.	"Give It to Her" (performed by Tanto Metro and Devonte)	Mark Wolfe; Wayne Passley; Jeremy Harding	3:32
7.	"Holla at a Playa" (performed by Jim Crow)	Damon Green; Jamal Jones; Ricardo Lewis; Sean Paul Joseph; Phalon Alexander	3:31
8.	"Bia' Bia'" (performed by Lil' Jon & the East Side Boyz, Too $hort and Chyna Whyte)	Jonathan Smith; Sam Norris; Todd Shaw; Stephanie Martin	3:52
9.	"We Can't Lose" (performed by Rottin Razkals)	Barr; Ray; Criss; Melvin Dinkins; B. Moss; E. Gist; S. Mobley	4:57
10.	"Pimpin' Hoes" (performed by Kokane and Pimpin' Young)	Jerry Buddy Long, Jr.; Darnell Riley, Jr.; Thomas Muscatine	3:51
11.	"Platinum in da Ghetto" (performed by Lil' Keke)	Marcus Edwards; Monte Moir	4:21
12.	"Nice Ta Meet Ya" (performed by Baby Beesh)	Ronald Ray Bryant; Nathan Perez	3:38
13.	"Thug fa Life" (performed by Chyna Whyte)	Martin; Billy Hume	3:59
14.	"Knuckle Up" (performed by Tre+6)	Corey Evans; Mark Seymour	2:45
Total length:			54:02
