= Put Yo Hood Up =

Studio album by Lil Jon & the East Side Boyz
- Released: May 22, 2001
- Recorded: 1996; 2000–01
- Studio: PatchWerk Recording Studios (Atlanta, Georgia); Streetlight Studios (New York City); The Zone (Atlanta, Georgia); Sound Lab (Atlanta, Georgia); Blue Basement Recordings (Atlanta, Georgia); Q95.5 (St. Louis, Missouri); Dangerous Music (Atlanta, Georgia); Pyramid Sound Recording Studios (Ithaca, New York); The Cutting Room (New York City); BME Studios
- Genre: Southern hip-hop; crunk
- Length: 1:18:30
- Label: BME; TVT
- Producer: Danny D; Lil Jon; Mr. Collipark; Paul Lewis

Lil Jon & the East Side Boyz chronology
We Still Crunk!! (2000)	Put Yo Hood Up (2001)	Kings of Crunk (2002)

Singles from Put Yo Hood Up
- 1. "Bia' Bia'" Released: January 23, 2001

Professional ratings
Review scores
Source	Rating
AllMusic	3.5/5 stars
Robert Christgau	(dud)

Put Yo Hood Up is the third studio album by American Southern hip-hop group Lil Jon & the East Side Boyz. It was released on May 22, 2001, through BME Recordings/TVT Records. The recording sessions took place at Patchwerk Recording Studios, The Zone, Sound Lab, Blue Basement Recordings and Dangerous Music in Atlanta, at Streetlight Studios and The Cutting Room in New York, at Q95.5 in St. Louis, at Pyramid Sound Recording Studios in Ithaca, and at BME Studios. The album was produced by Lil Jon, Danny D, Mr. Collipark, and Paul Lewis. It features guest appearances from Chyna Whyte, Oobie, Too Short, 6 Shot, 8Ball & MJG, Big Kap, Bohagon, Don Yute, Jazze Pha, Khujo, Kilo Ali, Ludacris, M.O.P., Quint Black, Skyy, the Nation Riders, Three 6 Mafia, and YoungBloodZ, with cameo appearances from Carolyn, DJ Hershey, Leah, Mimi, Nathan Smith, and Sincerley.

The album peaked at number 43 on the US Billboard 200, number 6 on the Top R&B/Hip-Hop Albums and topped the Independent Albums chart. It was certified Gold by the Recording Industry Association of America on June 6, 2002, for sales of over 500,000 copies in the United States.

== Track listing ==
No.	Title	Writer(s)	Producer(s)	Length
1.	"Yall Aint Ready"		Lil Jon	1:38
2.	"Uhh Ohh" (featuring Khujo and Bohagon)	Jonathan Smith; Sam Norris; Willie Knighton; Cedric Leonard	Lil Jon	5:08
3.	"Put Yo Hood Up"	J. Smith; Norris	Lil Jon	5:07
4.	"Bia' Bia'" (featuring Ludacris, Too Short, Big Kap, Chyna Whyte, and Nathan Smith)	J. Smith; Norris; Christopher Bridges; Todd Shaw; Keith Carter; Stephanie Lewis	Lil Jon	5:01
5.	"Bia' Bia' Check In"		Lil Jon	0:35
6.	"Who U Wit"	J. Smith; Norris; Wendell Neal	Lil Jon; Paul Lewis	4:32
7.	"Let My Nuts Go" (featuring Too Short, Quint Black, and the Nation Riders)	J. Smith; Norris; Neal; Shaw; Quinton Banks; Nation Riders	Lil Jon	4:24
8.	"Move Bitch" (featuring Three 6 Mafia, YoungBloodZ, Chyna Whyte, and Don Yute)	J. Smith; Ricky Dunigan; Lola Mitchell; Jordan Houston; Paul Beauregard; Sean Paul Joseph; Jeffrey Grigsby; Lewis; Jason Williams	Lil Jon	5:28
9.	"Heads Off (My Niggas)" (featuring M.O.P.)	J. Smith; Norris; Jamal Grinnage; Eric Murray	Lil Jon	4:57
10.	"Sexlude" (featuring Leah)		Lil Jon	1:12
11.	"Can't Stop Pimpin" (featuring 8Ball & MJG, Oobie, Mimi, and Sincerley)	J. Smith; Norris; Premro Smith; Marlon Goodwin; Tenaia Sanders; Craig Love; LaMarquis Jefferson	Lil Jon	5:57
12.	"Bounce Dat" (featuring Chyna Whyte and 6 Shot)	J. Smith; Norris; Neal; Lewis; Jermaine Tucker; James Phillips	Lil Jon	4:12
13.	"Nothins Free" (featuring Oobie)	J. Smith; Norris; Sanders; Love	Lil Jon	4:22
14.	"Searcylude"		Lil Jon	0:23
15.	"Where Dem Girlz At" (featuring Skyy, Chyna Whyte, and Carolyn)	J. Smith; Norris; Skyler Synclair Keeton; Charlie Singleton; Larry Blackmon; Nathan Leftenant; Thomas Michael Jenkins	Lil Jon	4:00
16.	"I Like Dem Girlz" (featuring Jazze Pha)	J. Smith; Norris; Neal	Lil Jon	4:27
17.	"Nasty Girl" (featuring Oobie)	J. Smith; Norris; Neal; Danny Spohn; Anthony Ray Butler	Danny D; Lil Jon (co.)	4:27
18.	"DJ Hershey Live at the Blue Flamelude" (featuring DJ Hershey)		Lil Jon	2:46
19.	"Go Shawty Go" (featuring Kilo Ali)	J. Smith; Norris; Andrell Rogers; Butler	DJ Smurf; Lil Jon (co.)	3:58
20.	"Outro Chynalude"	J. Smith; Lewis; Shaw	Lil Jon	2:23
21.	"Bia' Bia' 2" (featuring Too Short and Chyna Whyte)	J. Smith; Norris; Shaw; Lewis	Lil Jon	3:53
Total length:				1:18:30

Sample credits

- Track 15 contains an interpolation of "Talking Out the Side of Your Neck", written by Charlie Singleton, Larry Blackmon, Nathan Leftenant, and Tomi Jenkins, as performed by Cameo
- Track 16 contains an interpolation of "Set It Off", written by Steve Standard, as performed by Strafe
- Track 17 contains a sample of "Lookout Weekend", written by Pretty Tony, as performed by Debbie Deb
- Track 19 contains a sample of "Jam the Box", written and performed by Pretty Tony
- Track 20 contains an interpolation of "Cuss Words", written and performed by Too Short

== Personnel ==
Lil Jon & the East Side Boyz

- Jonathan "Lil Jon" Smith – vocals, producer (tracks: 1–16, 18, 20, 21), co-producer (tracks: 17, 19), mixing (tracks: 1–7, 9, 11–16), recording (tracks: 2, 3, 6, 15), additional mixing and recording (track 20), executive producer, A&R
- "Big Sam" Norris – vocals
- Wendell "Lil' Bo" Neal – vocals

Guest vocalists

- Willie "Khujo Goodie" Knighton – vocals (track 2)
- Cedric "Bo Hagon" Leonard – vocals (track 2)
- Christopher "Ludacris" Bridges – vocals (track 4)
- Todd "Too Short" Shaw – vocals (tracks: 4, 7, 21)
- Keith "Big Kap" Carter – vocals (track 4)
- Stephanie "Chyna Whyte" Lewis – vocals (tracks: 4, 8, 12, 21), additional vocals (track 15)
- Nathan Smith – additional vocals (track 4)
- Quinton "Quint Black" Banks – vocals (track 7)
- The Nation Riders – vocals (track 7)
- Ricky "Lord Infamous" Dunigan – vocals (track 8)
- Lola "Gangsta Boo" Mitchell – vocals (track 8)
- Jordan "Juicy J" Houston – vocals (track 8)
- Paul "DJ Paul" Beauregard – vocals (track 8)
- Sean Paul Joseph – vocals (track 8)
- Jeffrey "J-Bo" Grigsby – vocals (track 8)
- Jason "Don Yute" Williams – vocals (track 8)
- Jamal "Lil' Fame" Grinnage – vocals (track 9)
- Eric "Billy Danze" Murray – vocals (track 9)
- Leah – vocals (track 10)
- Premro "8Ball" Smith – vocals (track 11)
- Marlon "MJG" Goodwin – vocals (track 11)
- Tenaia "Oobie" Sanders – vocals (tracks: 11, 13, 17)
- Mimi – chanting vocals (track 11)
- Sincerley – chanting vocals (track 11)
- Jermaine "6 Shot" Tucker – backing vocals (track 12)
- Skyler Synclair "Skyy" Keeton – vocals (track 15)
- Carolyn – additional vocals (track 15)
- Phalon "Jazze Pha" Alexander – additional vocals (track 16)
- DJ Hershey – vocals (track 18), scratches (track 19)
- Andrell "Kilo Ali" Rogers – vocals (track 19)

Guest musicians

- Craig Love – guitar (tracks: 1, 10, 11)
- James "LRoc" Phillips – keyboards (tracks: 4, 7, 12, 15, 16, 20)
- Robert "R.O.B." McDowell – keyboards (track 10), executive producer
- LaMarquis Jefferson – bass (track 11)

Technicals

- Paul Lewis – producer & engineering (track 6)
- Danny "D" Spohn – producer (track 17)
- Michael "Mr. Collipark" Crooms – producer (track 19)
- Don "DJ Snake" Brown – recording (tracks: 1, 7, 20), mixing (tracks: 1, 9–13, 16–19)
- Mark Mitchell – recording (tracks: 1, 9, 13, 17, 18)
- Mike Wilson – recording (tracks: 1, 18, 19)
- Tim Obremski – engineering assistant (tracks: 1, 9–11, 13, 17, 18), recording engineer assistant (tracks: 19, 20)
- William "Billy Hume" Whedbee – recording & mixing (tracks: 2, 3, 8, 15, 16), additional mixing and recording (track 20)
- Jonathan Cooper – recording & mixing (track 4)
- Robin Mays – recording (tracks: 4, 7, 8, 12, 16)
- Jan Nerud – recording (tracks: 4, 11)
- Mike Fox – recording (track 5)
- Carlos Glover – recording & mixing (track 6)
- Robert Brown – Protools editing (track 6)
- Alexander Lowe – mixing (track 7)
- Taj Tilghman – recording (tracks: 8, 21), mixing (track 21)
- Rock Logic – recording (track 9)
- Sky Gray – recording engineer assistant (track 9)
- Kevin Parker – recording (tracks: 10, 19)
- Bob Brown – recording (track 11)
- Geoff – engineering assistant (track 11)
- Joshua A. Butler – recording (track 17)
- Duncan Stanbury – mastering
- Dwayne "Emperor" Searcy – executive producer
- Vince "VP" Phillips – executive producer, management
- Benjamin Wheelock – design
- Anders Jones – photography
- Bryan Leach – A&R
- Howard Sadowsky – management
- Tiffany Hasbourne – stylist
- Rob Mitchell – booking

== Charts ==
Chart performance for Put Yo Hood Up
Chart (2001)	Peak position
US Billboard 200	43
US Top R&B/Hip-Hop Albums (Billboard)	6
US Independent Albums (Billboard)	1

== Certifications ==
Certifications for Put Yo Hood Up
Region	Certification	Certified units/sales
United States (RIAA)	Gold	500,000^{^}
^{^} Shipments figures based on certification alone.
