= Part II (Lil Jon & the East Side Boyz album) =

EP by Lil Jon & the East Side Boyz
- Released: November 25, 2003
- Recorded: 2003
- Genre: Southern hip-hop; crunk; dirty rap
- Length: 34:14
- Label: TVT
- Producer: Lil Jon

Lil Jon & the East Side Boyz chronology
Certified Crunk (2003)	Part II (2003)	Crunk Juice (2004)

Professional ratings
Review scores
Source	Rating
AllMusic	2/5 stars
Robert Christgau	(2-star Honorable Mention)

Part II is an EP by Lil Jon & the East Side Boyz that consists mainly of remixes of the studio album Kings of Crunk.

== Track listing ==
No.	Title	Writer(s)	Producer(s)	Length
1.	"Get Low (Remix)" (featuring Elephant Man, Busta Rhymes & Ying Yang Twins)	Jonathan Smith; Sam Norris; O'Neil Bryan; Trevor Smith; Eric Jackson; Deongelo Holmes	Lil Jon	5:11
2.	"Get Low (Merengue Mix)" (featuring Pitbull & Ying Yang Twins)	J. Smith; Norris; Luis Diaz; Hugo Diaz; Holmes; Jackson	The Diaz Bros.	4:03
3.	"Get Your Weight Up" (featuring T.I. & 8Ball)	J. Smith; James Phillips; Clifford Harris; Premro Smith	Lil Jon; LRoc (co.)	4:41
4.	"Throw It Up (Remix)" (featuring Young Buck & Pastor Troy)	J. Smith; Norris; Micah Troy; David Brown; Donnell Prince; Clint Mansell	Lil Jon	6:15
5.	"Put Yo Hood Up' (Remix)" (featuring Jadakiss, Petey Pablo, Chyna Whyte & Roy Jones Jr.)	J. Smith; Norris; Jason Phillips; Moses Barrett III; Stephanie Martin	Lil Jon	5:11
6.	"What They Want" (Chyna Whyte featuring Ying Yang Twins)	Jevor Campbell; Martin; Holmes; Jackson	Jevor; Beat-In-Azz (co.)	3:36
7.	"Dirty Dancin" (Oobie featuring Lil Jon & the East Side Boyz)	J. Smith; Tenaia Sanders; Craig Love; Robert McDowell	Lil Jon	5:17
Total length:				34:14

Sample credits

- "Get Low (Merengue Mix)" contains a sample from "La Segue", written by José del Carmen Ramírez, performed by Kinito Méndez.
- "Throw It Up (Remix)" contains replayed elements from "Summer Overture", written by Clint Mansell.

== Charts ==
=== Weekly charts ===
Chart (2003)	Peak position
US Billboard 200	37
US Independent Albums (Billboard)	1
US Top R&B/Hip-Hop Albums (Billboard)	7

=== Year-end charts ===
Chart (2004)	Position
US Billboard 200	185
US Top R&B/Hip-Hop Albums (Billboard)	42
