= Ben Ramsey =

Ben Ramsey may refer to:

- Ben Ramsey (politician)
- Ben Ramsey (filmmaker)
