= One Gud Cide =

American hip hop group

- Origin: Fort Worth, Texas, USA
- Genres: Southern hip hop Hardcore rap
- Years active: 1991–2002
- Label: Scarred for Life Records
- Members: Twisted Black; Evil Seed
- Past members: Shawn Jackson

One Gud Cide was an American hip-hop duo based out of Fort Worth, Texas. Formed in 1991 by Twisted Black and Shawn Jackson the group is revered among many modern rappers for their pioneering approach to portraying urban violence through hip hop. In 2006 Twisted Black was sentenced to 30 years in jail for a fourth offense cocaine conspiracy charge.

== History ==
One Gud Cide was formed in 1991 by Twisted Black and Shawn Jackson, eventually Evil Seed became a member of the Fort Worth based group. The group's initial progress was slowed when Twisted Black was shot in the face and lost half of his jaw in what he claimed was an assassination attempt. By 1995, the group had achieved underground success with the album Look What The Streets Made, which sold 10,000 copies in less than 30 days. The group's career was interrupted once again when Twisted Black, whose real name is Tommy Burns, was sentenced to three years in prison on a parole violation. Work on the group's follow-up album Contradictions was interrupted by that incident.

Contradictions was finished and eventually released in 1999 on Suave House Records. It included contributions from hip hop mainstays like Eightball of Eightball & MJG fame and UGK. In 2002, Evil Seed reported quit the group because Twisted Black was working on his first solo album, eventually entitled Late Bloomer.

Twisted Black's most recent album, Street Fame was released in March 2007 on TVT Records a label with a history of promoting Dirty South artists. Meanwhile, Twisted Black was sentenced to life in prison after being convicted of conspiracy to distribute cocaine.

== Discography ==
- Look What the Streets Made (1995)
- Game of Life (EP) (1996)
- Contradictions (1999)
- Contradictions Screwed (2000)
