= American Music Award for Favorite Rap/Hip Hop Band/Duo/Group =

Music award

American Music Awards for Favorite Rap/Hip Hop Band/Duo/Group
- Country: United States
- Presented by: American Music Awards
- First award: 2003 (January)
- Final award: 2008
- Currently held by: Three 6 Mafia

Highlights
- Most wins: The Black Eyed Peas; Outkast (2 each)
- Most nominations: The Black Eyed Peas (3)
- Website: theamas.com

The American Music Award for Favorite Rap/Hip Hop Band/Duo/Group was awarded since 2003, but was discontinued after 2008. Years reflect the year during which the awards were presented, for works released in the previous year (until 2003 onward, when awards were handed out on November of the same year). The all-time winner in this category is tied between Outkast and The Black Eyed Peas with two wins each. The Black Eyed Peas are the most nominated act with three nominations.

== Winners and nominees ==
=== 2000s ===
Year	Artist	Ref
2003 (30th)
2003 (30th)	Outkast	
2003 (30th)	B2K	
2003 (30th)	Nappy Roots	
2003 (31st)
2003 (31st)	Lil Jon and the East Side Boyz	
2003 (31st)	The Black Eyed Peas	
2003 (31st)	Bone Crusher	
2004 (32nd)
2004 (32nd)	Outkast	
2004 (32nd)	G-Unit	
2004 (32nd)	Ying Yang Twins	
2005 (33rd)
2005 (33rd)	The Black Eyed Peas	
2005 (33rd)	Lil Jon and the East Side Boyz	
2005 (33rd)	Ying Yang Twins	
2006 (34th)
2006 (34th)	The Black Eyed Peas	
2006 (34th)	Dem Franchize Boyz	
2006 (34th)	Three 6 Mafia	
2007 (35th)
2007 (35th)	Bone Thugs-n-Harmony	
2007 (35th)	Pretty Ricky	
2007 (35th)	Shop Boyz	
2008 (36th)
2008 (36th)	Three 6 Mafia	
2008 (36th)	G-Unit	
2008 (36th)	Wu-Tang Clan	

== Category facts ==
=== Multiple Wins ===
2 wins

- The Black Eyed Peas
- Outkast

=== Multiple Nominations ===
3 nominations

- The Black Eyed Peas

2 nominations

- G-Unit
- Lil Jon and the East Side Boyz
- Outkast
- Three 6 Mafia
- Ying Yang Twins
