= Get Crunk, Who U Wit: Da Album =

Studio album by Lil' Jon & the East Side Boyz
- Released: October 21, 1997
- Recorded: 1996–97
- Studios: Entertainment International Studios (Atlanta, GA); Purple Dragon Studios (Atlanta, GA); Kala Studios (Atlanta, GA)
- Genres: Bass music; crunk
- Length: 56:46
- Label: Mirror Image
- Producers: DJ Toomp; Lil' Jon

Lil' Jon & the East Side Boyz chronology
Get Crunk, Who U Wit: Da Album (1997)	We Still Crunk!! (2000)

Singles from Get Crunk, Who U Wit: Da Album
- 1. "Who U Wit?" Released: July 15, 1997; 2. "Shawty Freak a Lil Sumtin'" Released: April 21, 1998

Professional ratings
Review scores
Source	Rating
AllMusic	2/5 stars
RapReviews	4.5/10

Get Crunk, Who U Wit: Da Album is the debut studio album by American Southern hip hop group Lil' Jon & the East Side Boyz. It was released on October 21, 1997, via Mirror Image Entertainment. The recording sessions took place at Entertainment International Studios, Purple Dragon Studios and KALA Studios in Atlanta. The production was handled by Lil' Jon and DJ Toomp, with Kool-Ace and Carlos Glover serving as executive producers. It features guest appearances from Playa Poncho, Disco Rick, DJ Kizzy Rock, Kool-Ace, Darryl E., DJ Pryme, Shorty Pimp, Jazze Pha, Romance and the East Side Girlz, with cameo appearances from Ayuna Burnett, Chris Smith, Nikki Jones, Jermaine Dupri, Emperor Searcy, Greg Street, Robert McDowell, Candice Austin, Stephanie Holder, Dee Dee Hibbler-Murray and Organized Noize's Ray Murray.

The album did not reach the US music charts, however, its singles "Who U Wit?" and "Shawty Freak a Lil Sumtin'" found minor success on the Billboard charts. "Who U Wit?" made it to the No. 70 on the Hot R&B/Hip-Hop Songs and No. 26 on the Hot Rap Songs. "Shawty Freak a Lil Sumtin'" peaked at No. 62 on the Hot R&B/Hip-Hop Songs and No. 32 on the Hot Rap Songs.

The album was reissued in 2001 with a bonus song "2 Step Drop" that featured Genuwine Leather, K-Hood, Kee Wee, Kool-Ace, Mic O'Mill, Ragga & Stretch. Some of the songs off of the album were included in 2003 Certified Crunk in slightly remixed form.

== Track listing ==
No.	Title	Writer(s)	Producer(s)	Length
1.	"Album Intro" (featuring Darryl E.)			0:26
2.	"Bounce dat Ass"	Jonathan Smith; Sam Norris; Wendell Neal	Lil' Jon	5:40
3.	"Shake Your Booty" (featuring Romance and Ayuna Burnett)	Smith; Norris; Travis Bridges	Lil' Jon	5:42
4.	"Get Crunk (Intro)" (featuring Darryl E. and Chris Smith)			0:49
5.	"Get Crunk" (featuring The East Side Girlz)	Smith; Norris; Neal	Lil' Jon	4:12
6.	"Who U Wit (Intro)" (featuring Nikki Jones)			1:02
7.	"Who U Wit" (featuring Playa Poncho)	Smith; Norris; Neal; Paul Lewis	Lil' Jon	4:31
8.	"Shawty Freak a Lil Sumtin' (Intro)" (featuring Darryl E., Jermaine Dupri, and Emperor Searcy)			0:13
9.	"Shawty Freak a Lil Sumtin'" (featuring Jazze Pha)	Smith; Norris; Neal; Aldrin Davis	DJ Toomp; Lil' Jon	4:09
10.	"Giddy Up Let's Ride / Giddy Up Let's Ride (Outro)" (featuring Disco Rick, Playa Poncho, and Greg Street)	Smith; Ricky Taylor; Gerald McCrary; Davis	DJ Toomp; Lil' Jon	4:02
11.	"Who U Wit (Bass Remix)" (featuring DJ Kizzy Rock)	Smith; Norris; Neal; Carlos Young	Lil' Jon	4:16
12.	"Cut Up (Intro)" (featuring Robert McDowell and Candice Austin)			1:15
13.	"Cut Up" (featuring Kool-Ace, Jazze Pha, and Stephanie Holder)	Smith; Norris; Neal; Brian Fleming; Phalon Alexander	DJ Toomp; Lil' Jon	4:04
14.	"Y'all Don't Feel Me" (featuring Darryl E. and DJ Pryme)	Smith; Darryl Elliot; M. Leverette	Lil' Jon	4:52
15.	"ATL (Intro)" (featuring Dee Dee Hibbler-Murray and Ray Murray)			0:24
16.	"ATL" (featuring Shorty Pimp and Ayuna Burnett)	Smith; Jamal Jones	Lil' Jon	3:58
17.	"Sign Off"			0:35
18.	"2 Step Drop" (performed by Last Man Standing featuring Lil' Jon and the Eastside Boyz, Kool-Ace, Ragga, Stretch, K-Hood, Genuwine Leather, Mic O'Mill, Kee Wee, and Tres-Up)	Carlos Glover; Fleming; A. Heard; E. Mason; M. Mckinney; L. Adair; K. Hood; H. Vaugn	Big Los	6:25
Total length:				56:46

Notes

- Track 18 is a 2001 reissue bonus track.

== Personnel ==
Lil' Jon & The East Side Boyz

- Jonathan "Lil Jon" Smith – voice (tracks: 1, 17), rap vocals (tracks: 2, 5, 7, 9, 11, 13, 14, 16, 18), background music (tracks: 1, 4), bass (tracks: 3, 5), producer (tracks: 2, 3, 5, 7, 9–11, 13, 14, 16), mixing
- "Big Sam" Norris – rap vocals (tracks: 2, 3, 5, 9, 11, 13, 14, 18), voice (track 17)
- Wendell "Lil' Bo" Neal – rap vocals (tracks: 2, 5, 11, 13, 14, 18), voice (track 17)

Vocalists

- Gerald "Playa Poncho" McCrary – rap vocals (tracks: 7, 10)
- Ricky "Disco Rick" Taylor – rap vocals (track 10)
- Carlos "DJ Kizzy Rock" Young – rap vocals (track 11)
- Brian "Kool-Ace" Fleming – rap vocals (tracks: 13, 18), executive producer
- Darryl Elliot – rap vocals (track 14), voice (tracks: 1, 4)
- M. "DJ Pryme" Leverette – rap vocals (track 14)
- Jamal "Shorty Pimp" Jones – rap vocals (track 16)
- Phalon "Jazze Pha" Alexander – vocals (tracks: 9, 13)
- Romance – backing vocals (track 3)
- The East Side Girlz – backing vocals (track 5)

Cameos

- Ayuna Burnett – voice (tracks: 3, 16)
- Chris Smith – voice (track 4)
- Nikki Jones – voice (track 6)
- Jermaine Dupri – voice (track 8)
- Dwayne "Emperor" Searcy – voice (track 8)
- Gregory "Greg Street" Polk – voice (track 10)
- Robert "R.O.B." McDowell – voice (track 12)
- Candice Austin – voice (track 12)
- Stephanie Holder – voice (track 13)
- Dee Dee Hibbler-Murray – voice (track 15)
- Ray Murray of Organized Noize – voice (track 15)

Musicians

- Josh Butler – keyboards (tracks: 3, 5)
- Rosemary Woods – keyboards (track 16)
- Paul Lewis – background music (tracks: 1, 4)
- Aldrin "DJ Toomp" Davis – producer (tracks: 9, 10, 13), mixing

Technicals

- Carlos Glover – mixing, engineering, digital editing, executive producer
- Ruairi Kilcullen – engineering, digital editing
- Mary McShane – engineering assistant
- Shawn Groove – engineering assistant
