= American Music Awards of 2003 (November) =

US television program

31st Annual American Music Awards
- Date: November 16, 2003
- Location: Shrine Auditorium, Los Angeles, California
- Country: United States
- Hosted by: Jimmy Kimmel

Highlights
- Most awards: 50 Cent and Luther Vandross (2 each)
- Most nominations: Justin Timberlake (3)

Television/radio coverage
- Network: ABC (November 16, 2003); Trans TV (November 22, 2003)
- Runtime: 180 min.
- Produced by: Dick Clark Productions

The 31st Annual American Music Awards were held on November 16, 2003, at the Shrine Auditorium, in Los Angeles, California. The awards recognized the most popular artists and albums from the year 2003.

== Performances ==
Artist(s)	Song(s)	Ref
Britney Spears	"Me Against the Music"	
Kid Rock; Twisted Brown Trucker	"Feel Like Makin' Love"	
Pink	"Trouble"	
Rod Stewart	"My Heart Stood Still"	
Alan Jackson	"Remember When"	
Ashanti	"Rain on Me"	
Clay Aiken	"Invisible"	
Ruben Studdard	"Superstar"	
Clay Aiken; Ruben Studdard	"Jesus Is Love"	
Hilary Duff	"Girl Can Rock" "So Yesterday"	
Evanescence	"Going Under"	
Fleetwood Mac	"Say You Will"	
Andre 3000	"Hey Ya!"	
Big Boi	"The Way You Move"	
Toby Keith	"I Love This Bar"	
Sheryl Crow	"The First Cut Is the Deepest"	
3 Doors Down	"Here Without You"	
Sean Paul	"Get Busy"	
Metallica	"St. Anger"	
The Bomb Squad^{[a]}	"Sophistafunk"	
Christina Aguilera	"Impossible / Beautiful"	

Notes

- ^{^[a]} Pretaped performance.
- ^{^[b]} 3rd Annual Coca-Cola New Music Award winners.

== Winners and nominees ==
Subcategory	Winner	Nominees
Michael Jackson International Artist of the Year
Artist of the Year	Madonna	Christina Aguilera; Cher; Shania Twain; Justin Timberlake
Fan's Choice Award
Fan's Choice Award	Clay Aiken	Beyoncé; 50 Cent; Matchbox 20; Tim McGraw; Justin Timberlake
Pop/Rock Category
Favorite Pop/Rock Male Artist	Kid Rock	Clay Aiken; John Mayer; Justin Timberlake
Favorite Pop/Rock Female Artist	Jennifer Lopez	Celine Dion; Avril Lavigne
Favorite Pop/Rock Band/Duo/Group	Fleetwood Mac	Matchbox 20; 3 Doors Down
Favorite Pop/Rock Album	Justified - Justin Timberlake	Fallen - Evanescence; Come Away with Me - Norah Jones; Cocky - Kid Rock
Soul/R&B Category
Favorite Soul/R&B Male Artist	Luther Vandross	Ginuwine; Jaheim; R. Kelly
Favorite Soul/R&B Female Artist	Aaliyah	Ashanti; Beyoncé
Favorite Soul/R&B Band/Duo/Group	Isley Brothers	B2K; Dru Hill
Favorite Soul/R&B Album	Dance with My Father - Luther Vandross	Chapter II - Ashanti; Dangerously in Love - Beyoncé; Chocolate Factory - R. Kelly
Country Category
Favorite Country Male Artist	Tim McGraw	Kenny Chesney; Alan Jackson; Toby Keith
Favorite Country Female Artist	Faith Hill	Martina McBride; Shania Twain
Favorite Country Band/Duo/Group	Alabama	Brooks & Dunn; Dixie Chicks
Favorite Country Album	Unleashed - Toby Keith	Tim McGraw and the Dancehall Doctors - Tim McGraw; Melt - Rascal Flatts; Up! - Shania Twain
Rap/Hip-Hop Category
Favorite Rap/Hip-Hop Male Artist	50 Cent	Eminem; Nelly; Sean Paul
Favorite Rap/Hip-Hop Female Artist	Missy Elliott	Eve; Lil' Kim
Favorite Rap/Hip-Hop Band/Duo/Group	Lil Jon & The East Side Boyz	The Black Eyed Peas; Bone Crusher
Favorite Rap/Hip-Hop Album	Get Rich or Die Tryin' - 50 Cent	Under Construction - Missy Elliott; Dutty Rock - Sean Paul; 8 Mile - Various artists
Adult Contemporary Category
Favorite Adult Contemporary Artist	Celine Dion	Cher; Norah Jones
Alternative Category
Favorite Alternative Artist	Linkin Park	Coldplay; Metallica
Latin Category
Favorite Latin Artist	Ricky Martin	Kumbia Kings; Luis Miguel
Inspirational Category
Favorite Contemporary Inspirational Artist	Steven Curtis Chapman	MercyMe; Third Day
