= Bia' Bia' =

2001 single by Lil Jon & the East Side Boyz

Single by Lil Jon & the East Side Boyz featuring Ludacris, Too Short, Big Kap and Chyna Whyte

from the album Put Yo Hood Up
- Released: January 23, 2001
- Recorded: 2000
- Genre: Hip-hop; crunk
- Length: 5:01
- Label: BME; TVT
- Songwriters: Jonathan Smith; Sam Norris; Stephanie Lewis; Todd Shaw; Christopher Bridges
- Producer: Lil Jon

Lil Jon & the East Side Boyz singles chronology
"I Like Dem Girlz" (2000)	"Bia' Bia'" (2001)	"Put Yo Hood Up" (2001)

Ludacris singles chronology
"Southern Hospitality" (2000)	"Bia' Bia'" (2001)	"One Minute Man" (2001)

Too Short singles chronology
"You Nasty" (2000)	"Bia' Bia'" (2001)	"I Luv" (2001)

"Bia' Bia'" is a song by American Southern hip-hop group Lil Jon & the East Side Boyz. Released as the first single from their third studio album Put Yo Hood Up (2001), the track features Ludacris, Too Short, Big Kap, and Chyna Whyte.

== Reception ==
Jason Birchmeier of AllMusic described "Bia' Bia'" as "the standout" on Put Yo Hood Up.

== Charts ==
Chart (2001)	Peak position
US Billboard Hot 100	94
US Hot R&B/Hip-Hop Songs (Billboard)	47
