= Get Low (Lil Jon & the East Side Boyz song) =

2003 single by Lil Jon & the East Side Boyz featuring Ying Yang Twins

Single by Lil Jon & the East Side Boyz featuring Ying Yang Twins

from the album Kings of Crunk
- B-side: "Lovers and Friends"
- Released: 2003
- Recorded: 2002
- Genre: Southern hip-hop; dirty rap; crunk
- Length: 5:34 (album version): 4:31 (radio edit/no Ying Yang Twins)
- Label: TVT
- Songwriters: Jonathan Smith; Eric Jackson; Deongelo Holmes
- Producer: Lil Jon

Lil Jon & the East Side Boyz singles chronology
"I Don't Give a F***" (2002)	"Get Low" (2003)	"Damn!" (2003)

Ying Yang Twins singles chronology
"Twurkulator Part II" (2003)	"Get Low" (2003)	"Naggin'" (2003)

"Get Low" is a song by American Southern hip-hop group Lil Jon & the East Side Boyz featuring American hip-hop duo Ying Yang Twins, released as a single in 2003. It first appeared on the 2002 album Kings of Crunk. "Get Low" peaked at number two on the Billboard Hot 100 and number 20 on the Hot Digital Songs chart. It was number five on the top Hot R&B/Hip-Hop songs of 2003. Outside of the United States, "Get Low" peaked within the top ten of the charts in the United Kingdom, the top twenty of the charts in Germany and the top forty of the charts in Australia, Austria, and New Zealand. It is also known as a breakthrough song for the crunk genre, as the song's success helped it become mainstream. It is listed number 99 on VH1's 100 Greatest Songs of Hip-Hop.

== History ==
Three different radio edits of "Get Low" have been released. One had amended lyrics (i.e. "take that thang to the floor, you scared, you scared"), while the other two bleeped out certain profanities. Of the two bleep censored versions, one version left the word "goddamn" intact while the other censored the word. Also, in the chorus (the clean version), the word "skeet" is said six times in the original place of "motherfucker" and the word "goddamn" is shortened to "got". The song popularized the word "skeet" in African-American Vernacular English (to ejaculate).

The Ying Yang Twins used their lines from the song later in their song "Hanh!" from the album Me & My Brother, and in the remix of Pitbull's song "Bojangles". In addition, the line "bend over to the front and touch your toes" was reused in Usher's 2004 song "Yeah!", on which Lil Jon and Ludacris provided the rap vocals.

A version of the song, highly edited due to its subject matter and use of profanity, was featured on the Need for Speed: Underground soundtrack. A less-edited version was featured nine years later on the Kinect game Dance Central 3. This song was also a playable track in the video game Def Jam Rapstar. The uncensored version appears in the Xbox 360 video game Def Jam: Icon. Lil Jon (without the East Side Boyz) appears in the video game as a playable character providing his own voice and likeness.

The song was also featured in the movies White Chicks, Coach Carter, Red, White & Royal Blue and The Proposal, where Sandra Bullock's character raps it. An abbreviated version of the song appeared in “The Mattress”, a season 3 episode of the scripted comedy series Brooklyn Nine-Nine. The song also makes an appearance in “Virtual In-Stanity”, a season 7 episode of the animated comedy series American Dad!, in which Stan Smith can be seen twerking to the song. Additionally, the song is performed at Cassie Howard’s wedding to Nate Jacobs in Euphoria.

During the song's recording, Lil Jon initially planned to use a hook saying "Let It Go" instead of "Get Low". He called it "the wackest chorus I've ever done in my entire career."

Lil Jon performed a version of the song as a special guest of the Georgia delegation at the 2024 Democratic National Convention, where he changed multiple verses to reference the nominees Kamala Harris and Tim Walz. American businessman Mark Zuckerberg collaborated with the singer T-Pain to remake the song that same year, dedicating this new acoustic cover to his wife Priscilla Chan.

== Remixes ==
Two official remixes were released in the EP Part II by Lil Jon & The East Side Boyz.

- Remix – featuring Elephant Man and Busta Rhymes (also released as a single)
- Merengue Remix – featuring vocals by Pitbull
- A mix of the song is featured as a blazing song in the video game Def Jam: Fight for NY
- Also in the video game Def Jam: Icon
- FreeStyleGames included a mix of the song with 50 Cent's In Da Club in the game DJ Hero 2.
- Became an unofficial main theme in the fan community Need for Speed: Underground.

== Chart positions ==
=== Weekly charts ===
Chart (2003–2005)	Peak position
Australia (ARIA)	23
Australian Urban (ARIA)	7
Austria (Ö3 Austria Top 40)	21
Germany (GfK)	11
Ireland (IRMA) with "Lovers and Friends"	22
New Zealand (Recorded Music NZ)	28
Scottish Singles Sales (Official Charts) with "Lovers and Friends"	21
Switzerland (Schweizer Hitparade)	44
UK Singles (Official Charts) with "Lovers and Friends"	10
UK Hip Hop/R&B (Official Charts) with "Lovers and Friends"	4
UK Indie (Official Charts) with "Lovers and Friends"	2
US Billboard Hot 100	2
US Hot R&B/Hip-Hop Songs (Billboard)	2
US Hot Rap Songs (Billboard)	1
US Pop Airplay (Billboard)	10
US Rhythmic Airplay (Billboard)	2

=== Year-end charts ===
Chart (2003)	Position
US Billboard Hot 100	11
US Hot R&B/Hip-Hop Songs (Billboard)	5

Chart (2004)	Position
Germany (Official German Charts)	50
US Billboard Hot 100	70
US Hot R&B/Hip-Hop Songs (Billboard)	67

Chart (2005)	Position
UK Singles (Official Charts Company)	189

=== Decade-end charts ===
Chart (2000–2009)	Position
US Billboard Hot 100	70

== Certifications ==
Region	Certification	Certified units/sales
New Zealand (RMNZ)	3× Platinum	90,000^{‡}
United Kingdom (BPI)	Platinum	600,000^{‡}
^{‡} Sales+streaming figures based on certification alone.
