= Twisted Black =

American rapper (born 1976)

- Twisted Black in 2024

Background information
- Also known as: 145
- Born: Tommy Delando Burns; October 18, 1976 (age 50)
- Origin: Detroit, Michigan, United States
- Genre: Hip hop
- Occupation: Rapper
- Labels: 3R Entertainment; Scarred 4 Life Records; TVT

Tommy Delando Burns (born October 18, 1976), known professionally as Twisted Black, is a rapper from Detroit, Michigan and settled in Fort Worth, Texas as a teen. He is on the 3R Entertainment/Scarred 4 Life Records label, and has also released music under the pseudonym "145." His debut album with the duo One Gud Cide, Look What The Streets Made, sold 10,000 copies in less than 30 days.

In 1998, he was incarcerated for a period of time. In 1993, his son, Tommy Burns Jr, was born and, later, his daughters, Chelsea and Taylor Burns, were born. In July 2006, Twisted Black was arrested and charged by officers with the Drug Enforcement Administration in Midland, Texas, shortly after signing a deal with New York-based independent record label TVT Records. His TVT debut album, Street Fame, was released on March 6, 2007. Due out on the album release date is a DVD titled The Rise Of Twisted Black which was released through Twisted Black's own imprint Scarred For Life.

On February 22, 2007, he was sentenced to 30 years in prison on federal drug charges. On May 2, 2008, he won an appeal for a re-sentencing due to changes in sentencing guidelines regarding crack cocaine. Burns was released from prison on July 13, 2023, after serving approximately 16 years. Later that year, he released Federal Guidelines (Live from the Federal Prison), an 18-track album issued through Scarred 4 Life Entertainment on October 18, 2023. In September 2025, he was featured in a two-part interview on the After Party Radio Show hosted by Frenzee Broadcasting.

Twisted Black recent projects extend beyond music into film and digital media. He is developing Concrete, a series based on his life, and is pursuing an independent media platform through his own network. As an independent artist, these projects expand his work into visual storytelling, drawing on the experiences that have shaped his personal life and recording career. His recent musical activities include "Knock Knock," a collaboration with Shaquille O'Neal released in March of 2026 on the album Jacking Beats. His music has also received attention through social media posts and public acknowledgements from established hip-hop figures, including Wu-tang Clan, Snoop Dogg, BG, and LL Cool J.

== Discography ==
=== Albums ===
- 1995: One Gud Cide - Look What The Streets Made
- 1997: One Gud Cide - Contradictions
- 2003: Late Bloomer
- 2005: The Life of Tommy Burns
- 2005: The Life of Tommy Burns (Swishahouse Remix)
- 2007: Street Fame
- 2010: Hustle or Go Broke Vol. 5 Fed Story
- 2011: Hustle or Go Broke Fed Radio
- 2019: [Bought Sense: The Soundtrack]
- 2020: Black Life Matters
- 2023: Federal Guidelines (Live From The Federal Prison)

=== Mixtapes ===
- 2002: Da Official Mixtape
- 2005: Black Out Part 1
- 2006: Hustle or Go Broke Volume I
- 2006: Hustle or Go Broke Volume II
- 2006: Hustle or Go Broke Volume III
- 2007: Hustle or Go Broke Volume IV

=== Singles ===
- 2006: "I'm A Fool With It"
- 2016:"Mom Dead so should I Die"
- 2023: "Cook My Way"
