= Certified Crunk =

Compilation album by Lil Jon & the East Side Boyz
- Released: November 4, 2003
- Genre: Southern hip-hop
- Length: 57:31
- Label: Mirror Image Entertainment; Ichiban Records
- Producer: DJ Smurf; Kool-Ace; Lil Jon; Midnight Black

Lil Jon & the East Side Boyz chronology
Kings of Crunk (2002)	Certified Crunk (2003)	Part II (2003)

Professional ratings
Review scores
Source	Rating
AllMusic	2/5 stars

Certified Crunk is a compilation album by American Southern hip-hop group Lil Jon & the East Side Boyz. It was released on November 4, 2003 via Mirror Image Entertainment/Ichiban Records. Production was handled by Midnight Black, Kool-Ace, Mr. Collipark and Lil Jon. It features guest appearances from Jazze Pha, 404 Soldierz, Darryl E., DJ Pryme, Hitman Sammy Sam, Killer Mike, Ludacris, No Surrender, Playa Poncho, Ying Yang Twins, Organized Noize and Jermaine Dupri. The album peaked at number 197 on the Billboard 200, number 40 on the Top R&B/Hip-Hop Albums and number nine on the Independent Albums in the United States.

== Track listing ==
No.	Title	Writer(s)	Producer(s)	Length
1.	"Stop Trippin'" (featuring Ludacris)	Jonathan Smith; Wendell Neal; Sam Norris; Christopher Bridges; Daddy T; Lil Chris; Michael Crooms	DJ Smurf	6:25
2.	"Get Crunk"	Smith; Neal; Norris	Midnight Black	4:05
3.	"Crunk 107.9 (Intro)"			0:19
4.	"Who U Wit (East Side Girlz)" (featuring Playa Poncho)	Smith; Neal; Norris; Paul Lewis	Lil Jon	4:33
5.	"Bounce Dat"	Smith; Neal; Norris	Midnight Black	5:34
6.	"Get Crunk Radio" (featuring Jermaine Dupri)			0:09
7.	"One on One" (featuring Ying-Yang Twins)	D'eongelo Holmes; Eric Jackson; Crooms	Kool-Ace	3:50
8.	"Pussy Nigga" (featuring Hitman Sammy Sam)	Barry "Slick B" Adams; Mo Dirty; Terry "Spiter Man"; Shawn "Uncle Boocho"		5:01
9.	"Cut Up" (featuring Kool-Ace & Jazze Pha)	Smith; Neal; Norris; Brian Fleming; Phalon Alexander	Midnight Black	5:08
10.	"Don't Feel Me Yet" (featuring Darryl E. & DJ Pryme)	Smith; Darryl Elliot; M. Leverette	Midnight Black	4:48
11.	"Radio Check (Intro)"			0:21
12.	"Da 6 O'Clock Re-Mix"			4:59
13.	"107.9 Radio" (featuring Organized Noize)			0:12
14.	"Lil Jon Mega Mix" (featuring Jazze Pha)			6:53
15.	"Da Jump Off" (performed by No Surrender, Killer Mike & 404 Soldierz)	A. Grigley; Calvin Briggs; Delarmon Harold; Michael Render; Tracey Sewell	Midnight Black	5:14
Total length:				57:31

== Charts ==
Chart (2003)	Peak position
US Billboard 200	197
US Independent Albums (Billboard)	9
US Top R&B/Hip-Hop Albums (Billboard)	40
