= Ben Ramsey (filmmaker) =

American film producer

Ben Ramsey is an American retired screenwriter and film director, most commonly known as the screenwriter of The Big Hit (starring Mark Wahlberg) and Dragonball Evolution.

== Career ==
Ramsey began his career in Hollywood in 1996 when he wrote the Mark Wahlberg feature, The Big Hit for Sony Pictures. He would later go on to write Dragonball Evolution for 20th Century Fox. He directed the hit DTV action films Blood and Bone and Love and a Bullet which Sony also distributed. Most recently he directed the short film Black Salt for Ratti Entertainment and his own company Ramcity Productions.

=== Dragonball Evolution ===
In 2016, Ramsey issued a public apology for the film, claiming the film "marked a very painful creative point in my life". He wrote: "To have something with my name on it as the writer be so globally reviled is gut wrenching. To receive hate mail from all over the world is heartbreaking. (...) I went into the project chasing after a big payday, not as a fan of the franchise but as a businessman taking on an assignment. I have learned that when you go into a creative endeavor without passion you come out with sub-optimal results, and sometimes flat out garbage. So I’m not blaming anyone for Dragonball but myself."

In 2021, Ramsey retracted his apology on his Facebook page: “For the public record, I am in no way, shape or form responsible for the train wreck that was Dragonball Evolution! My script was infinitely better than the dumpster fire they actually shot! In fact my draft was the thing that brought Stephen Chow onboard who, up to that point, had no desire to make an American movie! The only reason I apologized back in 2016 was because I felt the fans deserved one and I knew they weren't gonna get one from anyone else involved! So I jumped on the sword alone for the fans! To give them a sense of closure. This one is for me! Now that I'm an old fart and basically DGAF for the most part, because, in this day and age anyone of us could be dead tomorrow! I'm tired of my name being associated with a script that was re-written and turned into that embarrassment of a movie! I got in this business because of my love for film and a desire to make great movies like Blood and Bone and my current project, iNTERFACE! I'm really proud of them because they were made from the heart! Hey Disney! You own it now! Here's a thought! Remake it! Shoot my original draft that Stephen Chow wanted to direct and get him to direct it! You will have a SMASH HIT! And the heat alone would be off the charts! Of course, I know that's never gonna happen but hey just putting it out there! Phew! it felt good getting that off my chest!”

== Filmography ==
Year	Title	Director	Writer	Producer	Other	Notes
1991	The Silence of the Lambs	No	No	No	Yes	Production assistant
1995	Stripteaser	No	No	No	Yes	Art department: Leadman
1995	Caged Heat 3000	No	No	No	Yes	Actor: "Killa"
1996	Don't Be a Menace to South Central While Drinking Your Juice in the Hood	No	No	No	Yes	Art department: swing gang
1996	Crossworlds	No	No	No	Yes	Art department: swing
1996	Zarkorr! The Invader	No	No	No	Yes	Actor: "Quincy"
1998	The Big Hit	No	Yes	No	No	
2002	Love and a Bullet	Yes	Yes	Yes	No	Executive producer
2002	Random Acts of Violence	No	No	No	Yes	Actor: "Teddy P"
2005	Inspired by...	No	No	Yes	No	Short film
2008	A Good Day to Be Black and Sexy	No	No	Yes	No	Executive producer
2009	Dragonball Evolution	No	Yes	No	No	
2009	Blood and Bone	Yes	No	No	Yes	Soundtrack writer and producer
2011	The Art Patron	No	No	No	Yes	Actor: "Bodyguard"; Short film
2015	Black Salt	Yes	No	No	No	Short film
2019	Interface	Yes	Yes	Yes	Yes	Actor: "Operator 247"; Short film
