= Street Fame =

Studio album by Twisted Black
- Released: March 6, 2007
- Studio: 3R Studios (Arlington, TX); N'Zone Studios (Atlanta, GA)
- Genre: Hip hop
- Length: 1:15:47
- Label: Scarred 4 Life; TVT
- Producer: Brian Allen; Cleo Butler; Daryl Marshall; Daryl Ray Law; DJ Toomp; Ernie G.; Erotic D.; Nick Magallanes; Tim Hunt

Twisted Black chronology
The Life of Tommy Burns (2005)	Street Fame (2007)

Professional ratings
Review scores
Source	Rating
AllHipHop	4/5 stars
PopMatters	6/10
RapReviews	6.5/10
Spin	3.5/5 stars

Street Fame is the third solo studio album by American rapper Twisted Black. It was released on March 6, 2007, via Scarred 4 Life Entertainment and TVT Records. Recording sessions took place at 3R Studios in Arlington and N'Zone Studios in Atlanta. Production was handled by Nick Magallanes, Tim Hunt, Brian Allen, Ernie G., Cleo Butler, Daryl Marshall, Daryl Ray Law, DJ Toomp and Erotic D., with Steve Gottlieb and James Eichelberger serving as executive producers. It features guest appearances from Butta, Chyna Whyte, Daryl Marshall, Gold Finger, Hogg, Keese, Kylo, Mike Dollars, Sielio, Syi, Thump and Yo Gotti.

== Track listing ==
No.	Title	Writer(s)	Producer(s)	Length
1.	"Throw It Up" (featuring Yo Gotti and Chyna Whyte)	Tommy Delando Burns; Mario Mims; Stephanie Martin; Tim Hunt	Tim Hunt	4:37
2.	"Shake" (featuring Butta)	Burns; Rotaurus Smith; Hunt; Brian Allen	Tim Hunt; Brian Allen	4:19
3.	"Wat Y'all Wanna Do" (featuring Mike Dollars and Syi)	Burns; Mike Smith; Syisha Torres; Ernest Green; Nick Magallanes	Ernie G.; Nick Magallanes; J. Pointer (co.)	3:20
4.	"S.W.A.C."	Burns; Hunt	Tim Hunt	4:15
5.	"The Block"	Burns; Hunt	Tim Hunt	4:50
6.	"How You Feel About That" (featuring Gold Finger)	Burns; Daryl Ray Law; Magallanes	Daryl Ray Law; Nick Magallanes; J. Pointer (co.)	4:03
7.	"Broke Street" (featuring Sielio, Thump and Hogg)	Burns; Cleo Butler; Rashad Thirlkill; Jacque Turentine; Hunt	Tim Hunt	4:47
8.	"Bout That" (featuring Keese and Kylo)	Burns; Marquis English; Kenneth Walker; Allen; Magallanes	Brian Allen; Nick Magallanes	4:30
9.	"Coldest Summer Ever" (featuring Daryl Marshall)	Burns; Daryl Marshall	Daryl Marshall; Nick Magallanes; J. Pointer (co.)	6:40
10.	"New Boot"	Burns; Green; Magallanes	Ernie G.; Nick Magallanes; J. Pointer (co.)	5:27
11.	"Hustler's Prayer"	Burns; Green; Magallanes	Ernie G.; Nick Magallanes; J. Pointer (co.)	5:11
12.	"I'm a Fool Wit It"	Burns; Aldrin Davis	DJ Toomp	4:17
13.	"Keep It Simple"	Burns; Butler; Magallanes	Cleo Butler; Nick Magallanes	4:18
14.	"Walk a Mile in My Shoes"	Burns; Corry Pertile; Magallanes	Erotic D; Nick Magallanes; J. Pointer (co.)	6:21
15.	"It's a Jungle"	Burns; Hunt; Allen	Tim Hunt; Brian Allen	4:03
16.	"Touch Toes"	Burns; Butler; Magallanes; M. Smith; Torentine	Cleo Butler; Nick Magallanes	4:49
Total length:				1:15:47

== Personnel ==
- Tommy "Twisted Black" Burns – vocals, associate producer
- Mario "Yo Gotti" Mims – vocals (track 1)
- Stephanie "Chyna Whyte" Martin – vocals (track 1)
- Rotaurus "Butta" Smith – vocals (track 2)
- Mike "Mike Dollars" Smith – vocals (track 3)
- Syisha "Syi" Torres – vocals (track 3)
- Gold Finger – vocals (track 6)
- Sielio – vocals (track 7)
- Thump – vocals (track 7)
- Hogg – vocals (track 7)
- Keese – vocals (track 8)
- Kylo – vocals (track 8)
- Daryl "DL" Marshall – vocals & producer (track 9)
- Tim Hunt – producer & recording (tracks: 1, 2, 4, 5, 7, 15)
- Brian Allen – producer (tracks: 2, 8, 15)
- Ernest "Ernie G." Green – producer (tracks: 3, 10, 11)
- Nick Magallanes – producer & recording (tracks: 3, 6, 8–11, 13, 14, 16)
- Daryl Ray Law – producer (track 6)
- Aldrin "DJ Toomp" Davis – producer & recording (track 12)
- Cleo Butler – producer (tracks: 13, 16)
- Erotic D. – producer (track 14)
- Jeff Pointer – co-producer (tracks: 3, 6, 9–11, 14), associate producer, co-A&R direction
- Robert Johnson – associate producer
- Anthony Gallow – mixing
- Janko Radosavljevco – additional mixing
- Dave McNair – mastering
- James Eichelberger – executive producer, A&R direction
- Steve Gottlieb – executive producer
- Phillip Morris – photography
- Benjamin Wheelock – design
- Jason Mazur – A&R coordinator
