= Chyna Whyte =

American rapper

- Born: Stephanie Christine Lewis; September 18, 1974 (age 52); New Orleans, Louisiana, U.S.
- Genre: Hip hop
- Occupations: Rapper; songwriter; author
- Years active: 1992–present
- Labels: BME; TVT; Seed Shop LLC
- Website: chynawhyte.com

Stephanie Christine Lewis (born September 18, 1974), better known as Chyna Whyte, is an American rapper. She is best known for her appearance in the Lil Jon & The East Side Boyz song "Bia' Bia'".

== Biography ==
Stephanie Lewis was born and raised in New Orleans, Louisiana; she started rapping when she was a child, and began pursuing it as a career in 1992. She prepared a demo tape with Donald "XL" Robertson and mailed it to several labels, but was unable to secure a deal until she caught the attention of Lil Jon—who at the time was an A&R representative for So So Def Recordings—in 1998. Jon invited Lewis to Atlanta, where he was assembling a group called Full Time Family. Full Time Family recorded some material together, but never released an album.

In 2001, Chyna served five months in federal prison; after being released, she spent the remainder of the year under house arrest, though her probation officer allowed her to travel to perform at concerts. The following year, she intended to release a solo album but put her music career on hold after becoming pregnant. Around this time, Chyna left Atlanta, though she returned in 2005 after Hurricane Katrina.

Chyna Whyte's output includes three mixtapes: The Whyte Out, Prelude to War, and The Real Deal Holyfield. She has also released several singles, including "Blocka Blocka", "Thug for Life", "What They Want", and "Girls Get Buck"—the last of which featured Master P. She has appeared on commercially successful albums, including Lil Jon and the East Side Boyz's Platinum-certified Kings of Crunk and Gold-certified Put Yo Hood Up, as well as Too Short's Gold-certified You Nasty. Chyna has also featured on albums by Bone Crusher (AttenCHUN!), Naughty by Nature (IIcons), Twisted Black (Street Fame), Kane & Abel (The 7 Sins), and Six Shot (The Actual Meaning).

Chyna Whyte started her own publishing company, Seed Shop LLC, formerly named Ching Chong Publishing. Seed Shop has been affiliated with BMI since 1997.

== Bibliography ==
- Mu-Sicks Poisonous Venom. Ching Chong Publishing. April 4, 2011. ISBN 978-0615459028.
- Celibate But Still Masturbating. Ching Chong Publishing. November 2011. ISBN 978-0615569109.

== Discography ==
=== Studio albums ===
Title	Album details	Peak chart positions		
Title	Album details	US	US R&B	US Rap
Chyna Whyte	Released: N/A (unreleased); Label: BME, TVT Records; Format: CD, digital download	N/A		

=== Featured singles ===
Year	Single	Primary artist	Chart positions			Album
Year	Single	Primary artist	US Hot 100	R&B	R&B/Hip-Hop Airplay	Album
2001	"Bia' Bia'" feat. Chyna Whyte, Ludacris, Too Short, Big Kap	Lil Jon & The East Side Boyz	94	47	39	Put Yo Hood Up

=== Mixtapes ===
List of mixtapes, with year released
Title	Album details
The Whyte Out 2 – The Prelude to War	Released: 2006; Label: Self-released; Format: Digital download
