= Lil Jon =

American rapper (born 1971)

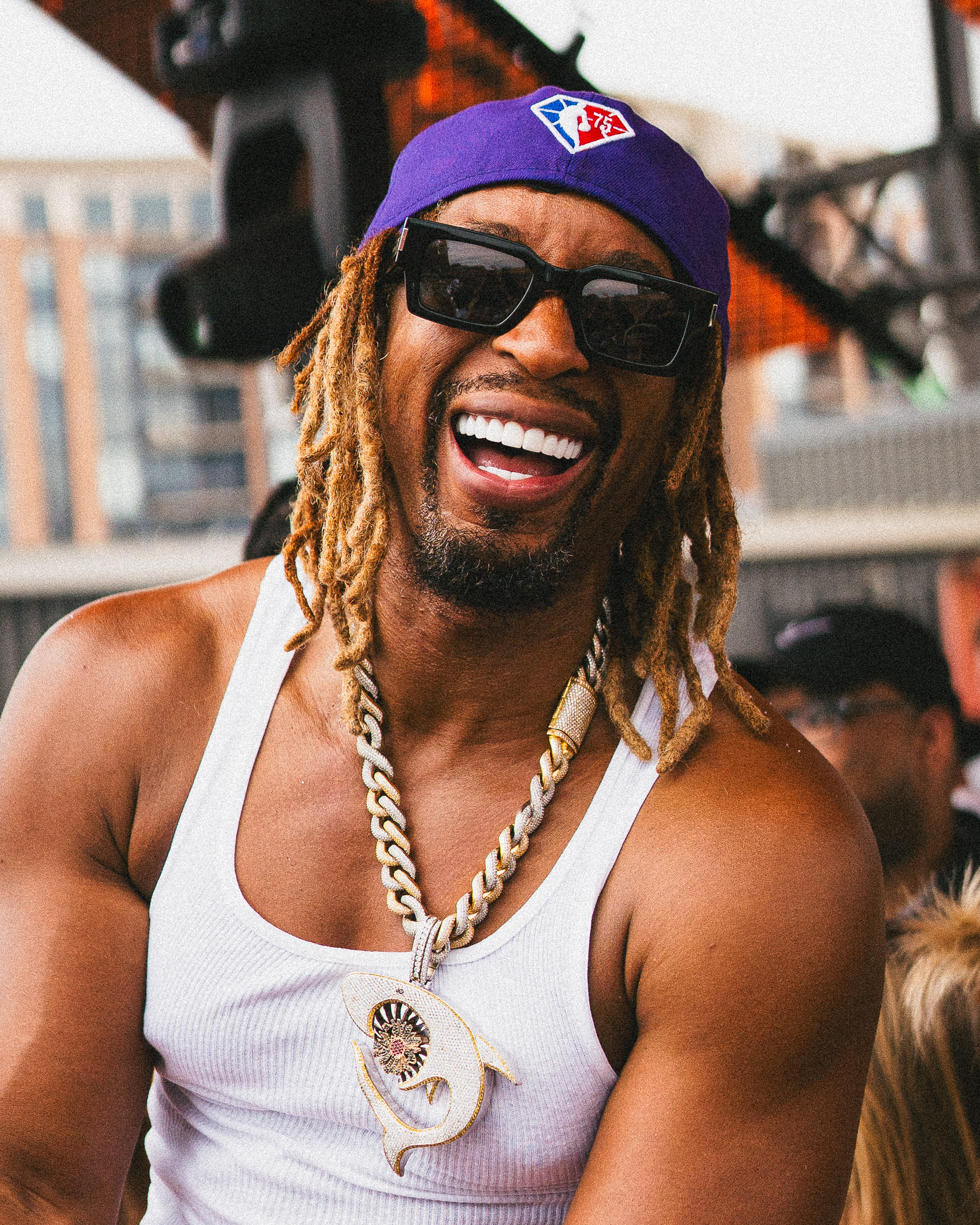
- Lil Jon in 2024

Background information
- Born: Jonathan H. Smith; January 17, 1971 (age 55); Atlanta, Georgia, U.S.
- Genres: Crunk; Southern hip-hop; EDM
- Occupations: Rapper; record producer; disc jockey; entrepreneur; record executive
- Instruments: Vocals; keyboards; synthesizer; drum machine; sampler
- Works: Recording; production
- Years active: 1991–present
- Labels: Epic; Republic; Geffen; Interscope; Black Market
- Formerly of: Lil Jon & the East Side Boyz
- Spouse: Nicole (m. 2004; sep. 2022)
- Children: 2
- Website: liljon.com

Jonathan H. Smith (born January 17, 1971), better known by his stage name Lil Jon, is an American rapper and record producer. Regarded as a progenitor of the club-oriented hip-hop subgenre crunk, his production and voice presence were instrumental in the genre's commercial breakthrough in the early 2000s. He was also the frontman of the group Lil Jon & the East Side Boyz, with whom he has released five albums.

Having been credited on most crunk releases throughout the 2000s, Lil Jon produced several of the genre's Billboard Hot 100 hits including "Salt Shaker" by Ying Yang Twins, "Cyclone" by Baby Bash, "Damn!" by YoungBloodZ, "Freek-a-Leek" by Petey Pablo, "Goodies" by Ciara, and "Yeah!" by Usher. The latter won Lil Jon a Grammy Award for Best Rap/Sung Performance as part of his five Grammy Award nominations. As a lead artist, three of his own singles—"Lovers and Friends" (with the East Side Boyz featuring Usher and Ludacris), "Get Low" (with the East Side Boyz featuring Ying Yang Twins), and "Snap Yo Fingers" (featuring E-40 and Sean P)—peaked within the chart's top ten. His debut studio album, Crunk Rock (2010), was met with lukewarm critical and commercial response.

In 2013, Lil Jon released "Turn Down for What" (with DJ Snake), an EDM single that has been certified 8× platinum by the Recording Industry Association of America (RIAA). The song went on to win the Billboard Music Award for Top Dance/Electronic Song. Its accompanying music video was nominated for Best Music Video at the 57th Annual Grammy Awards, and passed the milestone of 1 billion views on YouTube in 2020. Listed as one of the Top Billboard Music Award Winners of All Time in 2016, Lil Jon has amassed his eight number one singles on Billboard's Rhythmic chart.

== Early life ==
Smith was born in Atlanta, Georgia, and raised in the city's Southwest Atlanta region. He is the oldest of five children born to his father, an aerospace engineer with former military service, and his mother, with a medical career within the military. Three of his siblings would later follow their parents' lead and also serve in the United States military.

Smith attended Beecher Hills Elementary School and Southwest Middle School, both located within the Atlanta Public Schools district. His mother described him as a high achiever early on in addition to being independent and a passionate reader. While in middle school, Smith became lifelong friends with Robert McDowell, Dwayne "Emperor" Searcy (future DJ and radio personality for Radio One's WHTA), and Vince Phillips (named as one of Billboard's Top Music Lawyers since 2020), who would become business partners. The foursome quickly became immersed in the skateboarding culture and would later work at Skate Escape, a popular skate and bicycle shop near the city's iconic Piedmont Park. While his best friends attended Benjamin E. Mays High School, Smith attended Frederick Douglass High School for their magnet program and was a member of the marching band. They also began to frequently attend concerts at the Masquerade, to see their favorite bands, including Agent Orange and Red Hot Chili Peppers.

At the age of 15, Smith taught himself how to DJ, and although his parents were strict, they gave him a chance to work on his DJ skills by allowing him to have house parties in the basement of the family home, citing that they would rather have him under their watch than for him to "be in the street somewhere wilding out". The parties, hosted by Smith and Searcy, "Old Eng and Chicken Wing" became popular with local teens. In addition to working at the skate shop, Smith also began spinning at house parties and working in local dance clubs as a DJ. Eventually, Smith became an in-house DJ at Phoenix, a popular Atlanta nightclub at the time. It was there he would meet established music artists such as Jermaine Dupri, TLC, the Notorious B.I.G., Craig Mack, and Mary J. Blige.

== Career ==
=== 1991–2000: So So Def Recordings ===
After graduating from high school, Lil Jon continued to work as a DJ in popular downtown Atlanta clubs; it was there he met Jermaine Dupri. When it came to hiring an A&R to lead his Atlanta-based record label So So Def Recordings, Dupri stated that "All I could think about was Lil Jon, because he was the person in the clubs. He knew people, DJs knew him. I had to hire him."

After he was promoted to Executive Vice President of A&R, Lil Jon recruited DJ Smurf, Shawty Redd, Raheem the Dream, and Playa Poncho with others to create the compilation album series, So So Def Bass All-Stars as his first project. Released on May 12, 1996, the album was a success, selling over 500,000 units and was certified gold by the RIAA on September 19, 1996, four months after its initial release. The album, executive produced by Lil Jon, included the hit single "My Boo" by Ghost Town DJ's. It was sampled by Ciara in her 2013 hit single "Body Party". In 2016, 20 years after its initial release, the song re-entered the Billboard Hot 100 chart at number 29 due to a viral dance video. Lil Jon completed the series, releasing So So Def Bass All-Stars Vol. II (1997) and So So Def Bass All-Stars Vol. III (1998).

Apart from his label commitments, Lil Jon was a radio personality and DJ on Atlanta radio station, V-103, continued to produce music for outside music artists, and was still working as a DJ at popular clubs around the city.

=== 1995–2005: Lil Jon & the East Side Boyz ===
In 1995, Lil Jon collaborated with Big Sam and Lil' Bo to form a rap group: Lil Jon & the East Side Boyz.

In 1996, the group released their debut single, "Who U Wit?". The song is credited as bringing the term "crunk" into hip-hop currency. In 1997, the group released their debut album Get Crunk, Who U Wit: Da Album. The singles, "Who U Wit" and "Shawty Freak a Lil Sumtin'", charted on the Hot R&B/Hip-Hop Songs chart at number 70 and number 62, respectively.

In 2000, through the newly created label Black Market, the group released their breakthrough album We Still Crunk!!, which featured the single "I Like Dem Girlz", which reached number 55 on the Billboard R&B chart and number 3 on the Billboard Hot Rap Tracks chart.

Bryan Leach, formerly an A&R executive at the now defunct New York-based label TVT Records, heard about the group and attended their Atlanta show. He was blown away by the group's immense energy. Leach told HitQuarters: "It was like early Beastie Boys, when they had the energy of a rock group but they were rapping and it was just so different. Jon and I even referred to Lil Jon & The East Side Boyz as the black Beastie Boys because that energy is what crunk music is all about." By 2002, Leach signed Lil Jon & the East Side Boyz to TVT Records with Black Market delivering the albums to the label. The group released the album Put Yo Hood Up, which combined previously released tracks with new ones. "Bia' Bia'" (featuring Ludacris, Too Short, Big Kap, and Chyna Whyte) was the group's first single to be played nationally. "Bia' Bia'" peaked at number 97 on the Billboard Hot 100 and number 47 on the Billboard R&B chart. The album was certified gold by the RIAA in June 2002.

In 2002, the group released their sophomore studio album under the label Kings of Crunk with the song "I Don't Give a Fuck" (featuring Mystikal and Krayzie Bone) as the first single. It peaked at number 50 on the Billboard R&B chart. The group's next single, "Get Low" (featuring Ying Yang Twins), became popular in nightclubs nationwide; it reached the top ten on the Billboard Hot 100. The album was certified multi-platinum by the RIAA in August 2004. The song was also featured in Need for Speed: Underground, which plays in the main menu as well as gameplay. In 2003, the group released Part II, a remix album of previously released singles with two new songs.

In 2004, Lil Jon & the East Side Boyz released what would be the group's last studio album, Crunk Juice. The lead single "What U Gon' Do" (featuring Lil Scrappy) peaked at number 22 on the Billboard Hot 100, number 13 on the Billboard R&B chart, and number 5 on the Billboard Rap chart. The second single, "Lovers and Friends" (featuring Usher and Ludacris), peaked at number 3 on the Billboard Hot 100, number 2 on the Billboard R&B Chart, and number 1 on the Billboard Rap chart. The album was certified multi-platinum in January 2005, two months after it was released. In 2005, after releasing six studio albums together and amidst ongoing creative and financial conflicts with TVT, the group disbanded.

=== 2006–present: Solo career ===
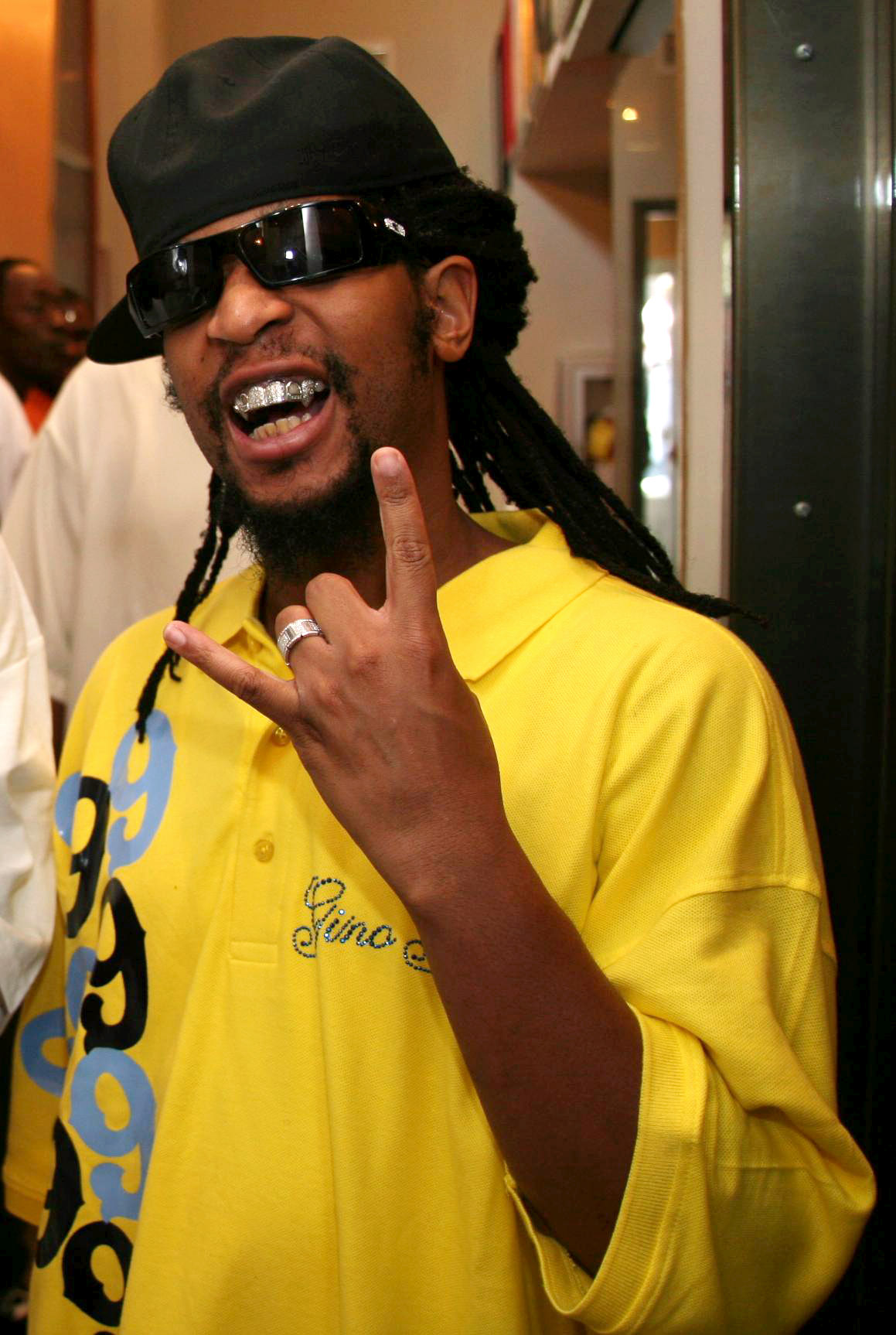
Lil Jon in 2007

In 2006, Lil Jon, in an attempt to fulfill his obligations to TVT, released the single "Snap Yo Fingers" (featuring E-40 and Sean P). The song peaked at number 7 on the Billboard Hot 100 and was certified platinum on November 22, 2006. After the song was released, Lil Jon vowed to never record for TVT Records again. In 2008, TVT Records, embroiled in legal battles, filed for Chapter 11 bankruptcy.

In 2009, Lil Jon was featured alongside Sean Paul on Jay Sean's double platinum single "Do You Remember" that was featured in the 2010 remake of The Karate Kid. On February 16, 2010, Lil Jon released a song with Jamie Drastik called "How Many Girls" which is as a track to Drastik's mixtape, The Magnet. On June 8, 2010, Lil Jon release his first solo album, Crunk Rock, through Universal Republic Records. It featured artists such as LMFAO, Ying Yang Twins, Pitbull, 3OH!3, Ice Cube, Waka Flocka Flame, Stephen Marley, and Damian Marley among others. The album peaked at number 8 on the Billboard Top R&B/Hip-Hop Albums chart and reached number 5 on the Billboard Top Rap Albums chart. The single, "Hey" (featuring 3OH!3), was also featured on the soundtrack for MTV's Jersey Shore with the entire cast appearing in the music video. The second single, "Outta Your Mind" (featuring LMFAO), was featured in the film Project X and used by Alex & Twitch on the Fox television series, So You Think You Can Dance, which is considered to be the finest hip-hop routine ever performed on the series.

Lil Jon said that "after the crunk era, I was fried from producing so much," eventually rediscovering a passion for performing as a DJ after discovering DJ Spider. This led to him meeting Steve Aoki, with whom he teamed up alongside Laidback Luke to record the song "Turbulence", released on May 14, 2011, as a digital download in the United Kingdom and was released on July 17, 2011, as an EP. The radio edit version of the song was included on the bonus track version of Aoki's debut album Wonderland. The song is also the current official goal song for the Toronto Maple Leafs.

In July 2011, he released a song with LMFAO called "Drink" through Ultra Records. It was used in the trailer for the film The World's End. In 2012, he appeared on three songs featured in the film Step Up Revolution and on the film's soundtrack. He would go on to perform one of the songs from the film, "Goin' In" by Jennifer Lopez on the season finale of television series American Idol.

In 2013, Lil Jon collaborated with DJ Snake and released "Turn Down for What" on Columbia Records. The song reached number 1 on Billboard's Rhythmic and Hot Dance/Electronic Songs charts, number 2 on the Dance/Mix Show Airplay chart, number 4 on the Hot 100, and number 5 on the Mainstream Top 40. The song has had significant use in media and was certified 6× platinum by the RIAA. Lil Jon also partnered with Zumba Fitness to create a new nightclub tour titled "Zumba Nightclub Series" and for the Zumba Fitness series, he released a new song called "Work".

On July 22, 2014, Lil Jon released the single "Bend Ova" (featuring Tyga) on Epic Records. The song was featured in the two-part series finale of the NBC television series Parks and Recreation. "Take It Off" (featuring Yandel and Becky G) was released on July 22, 2016, and the single "Alive" (featuring Offset and 2 Chainz) was released in 2018 on Geffen Records. In December 2018, Lil Jon released the Christmas single "All I Really Want for Christmas" (featuring Kool-Aid Man) in cooperation with the Kool-Aid brand of soft drinks.

In 2018, Lil Jon appeared in volume two of the Future-led soundtrack for the film Superfly. The following year, he appeared in the soundtrack for Spies in Disguise, curated by Mark Ronson.

Lil Jon made a cameo in Usher's Super Bowl LVIII halftime show, performing "Turn Down for What" and his portion of "Yeah!".

External videos
- Lil Jon introducing Georgia in the ceremonial state roll call at the 2024 Democratic National Convention, August 20, 2024, C-SPAN

Lil Jon appeared at the 2024 Democratic National Convention and introduced the Georgia delegation during the ceremonial roll call. He performed "Turn Down for What" and "Get Low", and instead of rapping "To the window ... to the wall!", he rapped "VP Harris ... Governor Walz".

He released a memoir, titled I Only Shout So You Can Hear Me, in October 2026.

== Other ventures ==
=== BME Recordings ===
BME Recordings
- Founded: 2004
- Founder: Lil Jon; Robert McDowell; Vince Phillips; Dwayne "Emperor" Searcy
- Status: Active
- Distributors: TVT; Reprise; Warner Bros.
- Country of origin: United States

In 2004, Lil Jon, Robert McDowell, Vince Phillips, and Dwayne "Emperor" Searcy launched BME Recordings in a joint venture with Warner Bros. Records and released The King of Crunk & BME Recordings Present: Trillville & Lil Scrappy (2004), with Lil Jon producing most of the album. The single "Some Cut" has been a favorite of samplers over the years. The label entered the San Francisco Bay Area hyphy music scene with Bay Area rapper E-40, releasing the album, My Ghetto Report Card (2006) with the Lil Jon-produced single "Tell Me When to Go". The label released the album Bred 2 Die, Born 2 Live (2006) by Lil Scrappy.

=== Acting career ===
In 2003, Lil Jon was the voice of Jang Ryang in the American remake of the South Korean film Volcano High, broadcast on MTV. After he was famously parodied by comedian Dave Chappelle, he would go on to make numerous appearances on the Comedy Central series Chappelle's Show. He has since appeared on various television shows including André 3000's animated series Class of 3000, Crank Yankers, Robotomy, Hell's Kitchen, Tiny House Nation, Hollywood Puppet Show, American Idol, About a Boy, The Celebrity Apprentice, and All-Star Celebrity Apprentice, Bar Rescue, The Bachelorette, Hip Hop Squares, and a commercial for Bud Light. Lil Jon is a fan of the television series The Walking Dead and has made multiple appearances as a guest on Talking Dead. On January 29, 2019, a Pepsi Super Bowl commercial featuring Lil Jon, rapper Cardi B, and actor Steve Carell was released. In 2022, Lil Jon teamed up with interior designer Anitra Mecadon for the HGTV series Lil Jon Wants to Do What?, centered around home renovations.

=== Guided meditation ===
Lil Jon released two albums of guided meditation in 2024. His first album of guided meditations, Total Meditation, was released on February 16, 2024. His second album of guided meditations, Manifest Abundance: Affirmations of Personal Growth, was released on May 10. Lil Jon's goal with these guided meditations is to help people find peace and worry less by developing a new way of thinking through meditation. Lil Jon meditates daily with affirmations.

=== Soul Chakra ===
Lil Jon founded wellness brand Soul Chakra in 2024. The brand offers a range of products and services aimed at promoting holistic well-being, including crystals, apparel, and guided meditation albums.

== Musical style and influences ==
Jason Birchmeier of AllMusic has described Lil Jon's production as "bass-heavy", and his album Put Yo Hood Up as having "a long and varied list of guest rappers to accompany the beats". Describing that album with guest performers, Birchmeier remarked: "The end result is an album that resembles a street-level mixtape rather than a traditional artist-oriented album".

Lil Jon was specifically influenced by 2 Live Crew, 8Ball & MJG, Three 6 Mafia, Outkast, Geto Boys, UGK, N.W.A, DJ Toomp, Dr. Dre, and Sir Mix-a-Lot. Alex Henderson, also of AllMusic, contrasted Lil Jon's style of "rowdy, in-your-face, profanity-filled party music" with other Southern rappers, those who "have a gangsta/thug life agenda" and those who convey "serious sociopolitical messages". Lil Jon has also found influence in rock music, having worked with Rick Rubin and Korn. He expresses this influence in his aggressive delivery and 'yelling' style of rap. He was seen on VH1's 100 Greatest Artists of All-Time program wearing a Bad Brains T-shirt, and he used to listen to Lynyrd Skynyrd while growing up in the South in the 1970s.

== Personal life ==
In 1998, with then-girlfriend Nicole, his son, Nathan (known as DJ Young Slade), was born. In 2004, he and Nicole married in Puerto Rico; they amicably separated in 2022. Lil Jon has stated that one of his greatest joys was seeing everything come full circle with his son, who had been DJing since the age of 11. On February 3, 2026, Nathan was reported missing. Three days later, his body was recovered from a pond at Mayfield Park in Milton, Georgia. He was 27.

He is an avid fan of all of Atlanta's sports teams which included the NHL's Atlanta Thrashers until they relocated to Winnipeg in 2011. He also follows the Las Vegas teams, claiming that being in the city during the 2017 Las Vegas shooting and seeing the community response made him want to support what he calls his second home. His support for the Vegas Golden Knights led to him appearing in the team 2019 documentary Valiant, and being given a Stanley Cup ring after their 2023 title, which he wore during the Super Bowl LVIII halftime show. He is also a fan of the University of Tennessee Volunteers and DJ Sterl the Pearl, who adopted his hit song "Turn Down for What" on third downs, changing it to "Third Down for What". On October 4, 2014, Lil Jon made an appearance via Jumbotron encouraging the Volunteers to beat the University of Florida Gators; and also visited the Volunteers, giving them a pep talk.

Lil Jon is a notable Atlanta resident and appears on advertisements in Hartsfield-Jackson Airport welcoming new arrivals to the city. He also appears on the Jumbotron at Mercedes-Benz Stadium during Atlanta Falcons and Atlanta United games. During Super Bowl LIII held in Atlanta in 2019, Lil Jon appeared in the NFL's "This Is Atlanta" promotional video to welcome incoming visitors to the city, alongside fellow Atlanta residents, former Atlanta Hawks basketball player Dominique Wilkins, former Atlanta Braves baseball player Chipper Jones, civil right icons Congressman John Lewis and former congressman, Ambassador to the United Nations and Mayor of Atlanta Andrew Young, rappers Big Boi and Killer Mike, singer Rozonda "Chilli" Thomas of TLC, comedian Jeff Foxworthy, and television personality Ryan Seacrest. Organized by Jermaine Dupri, a host of Atlanta area high school drummers, local brass musicians and the Atlanta Symphony Orchestra also appeared and supplied the underlying music. Lil Jon also appeared in CBS Sports' official open of the network's coverage of the game.

Sometime in 2024, Lil Jon began dating Jamila Sozahdah, who gave birth to his second child. Later that year, he converted to Islam.

== Philanthropy ==
Lil Jon has worked to help children in underdeveloped countries gain access to a proper education. He has helped to fund two schools in the village of Mafi Atitekpo in Ghana, in partnership with the charity Pencils of Promise. The first, Abomayaw D.A. Kindergarten, opened in October 2017. The second school, Mafi Atitekpo DA Primary School, broke ground in January 2018 and will enroll 313 children. In 2019, Pencils of Promise honored both Lil Jon and Trevor Noah in recognition of their charitable efforts at the charity's annual gala.

In 2018, a 16-year-old student of Douglass High School reached out to rapper and alumnus Killer Mike via Instagram in a last-chance attempt to raise money to cover expenses for the school marching band to travel to New Orleans to march in the annual Mardi Gras parade. To his surprise, Killer Mike not only responded positively, but also enlisted the help of fellow alumni Lil Jon and T.I. They and donors covered the trip for the students.

== Discography ==
=== Solo album ===
- Crunk Rock (2010)

=== Collaboration albums ===
With the East Side Boyz

- Get Crunk, Who U Wit: Da Album (1997)
- We Still Crunk!! (2000)
- Put Yo Hood Up (2001)
- Kings of Crunk (2002)
- Crunk Juice (2004)

With Kabir Sehgal

- Total Meditation (2024)
- Manifest Abundance: Affirmations for Personal Growth (2024)

== Awards and nominations ==
=== American Music Awards ===
The American Music Awards is an annual awards ceremony created by Dick Clark in 1973. Lil Jon & the East Side Boyz has received two nominations, winning one for Favorite Rap/Hip Hop Band/Duo/Group.

Year	Nominee / work	Award	Result
2003	Lil Jon & the East Side Boyz	Favorite Rap/Hip Hop Band/Duo/Group	Won
2005	Lil Jon & the East Side Boyz	Favorite Rap/Hip Hop Band/Duo/Group	Nominated

=== BMI London Awards ===
Broadcast Music, Inc. awards held in London to honor songwriters for their accomplishments in Europe.

Year	Nominee / work	Award	Result
2009	"The Anthem"	Pop Award	Won
2011	"Do You Remember"	Pop Award	Won

=== BMI Pop Awards ===
Broadcast Music, Inc. awards honor songwriters for their accomplishments in pop music.

Year	Nominee / work	Award	Result
2005	"Damn!"	Most Performed Songs	Won
2005	"Get Low"	Most Performed Songs	Won
2005	"Freek-a-Leek"	Most Performed Songs	Won
2005	"Yeah!"	Most Performed Songs	Won
2005	Himself	Songwriter of the Year	Won
2006	Himself	Songwriter of the Year	Won
2006	"Goodies"	Most Performed Songs	Won
2006	"Lovers and Friends"	Most Performed Songs	Won
2006	"Salt Shaker"	Most Performed Songs	Won
2011	"Do You Remember"	Most Performed Songs	Won
2015	"Turn Down for What"	Most Performed Songs	Won

=== BMI Urban R&B/Hip-Hop Awards ===
Broadcast Music Inc. awards honor songwriters and publishers for their accomplishments in R&B and hip-hop. The award was previously named BMI Urban Award.

Year	Nominee / work	Award	Result
2003	"Move Bitch"	Most Performed Songs	Won
2004	"Damn!"	Most Performed Songs	Won
2004	"Get Low"	Most Performed Songs	Won
2004	"Goodies"	Most Performed Songs	Won
2005	Himself	Songwriter of the Year	Won
2005	Himself	Top Urban Producers	Won
2005	"Freek-a-Leek"	Ringtone of the Year	Won
2005	"Freek-a-Leek"	Most Performed Songs	Won
2005	"Salt Shaker"	Most Performed Songs	Won
2005	"Yeah!"	Song of The Year	Won
2005	"Yeah!"	Most Performed Songs	Won
2006	"Lovers and Friends"	Most Performed Songs	Won
2007	"Snap Yo Fingers"	Most Performed Songs	Won
2007	"U and Dat"	Most Performed Songs	Won
2008	"Buy U a Drank (Shawty Snappin')"	Most Performed Songs	Won
2008	"Cyclone"	Most Performed Songs	Won
2008	"This Is Why I'm Hot"	Most Performed Songs	Won
2017	"For Free"	Most Performed Songs	Won
2020	"My Type"	Most Performed Songs	Won
2021	"Best on Earth"	Most Performed Songs	Won
2021	"Tap In"	Most Performed Songs	Won

=== Grammy Awards ===
A Grammy Award (stylized as GRAMMY) is an award presented by the Recording Academy to recognize achievement in the music industry.

Year	Recipient	Category	Result
2005	"Yeah!" (with Usher and Ludacris)	Record of the Year	Nominated
2005	"Yeah!" (with Usher and Ludacris)	Best Rap/Sung Collaboration	Won
2005	"Yeah!" (with Usher and Ludacris)	Best R&B Song	Nominated
2005	Confessions (with Usher)	Album of the Year	Nominated
2015	"Turn Down for What" (with DJ Snake)	Best Music Video	Nominated
2027	Remix Meditation	Best Audio Book, Narration & Storytelling Recording	Pending

=== MTV Video Music Awards ===
An MTV Video Music Award (abbreviated as a VMA) is an award presented by the cable channel MTV to honor the best in the music video medium.

Year	Nominee / work	Award	Result
2004	"Get Low" (with the East Side Boyz and Ying Yang Twins)	Best Rap Video	Nominated
2004	"Yeah!" (with Usher and Ludacris)	Video of the Year	Nominated
2004	"Yeah!" (with Usher and Ludacris)	Best Male Video	Won
2004	"Yeah!" (with Usher and Ludacris)	Best Dance Video	Won
2004	"Yeah!" (with Usher and Ludacris)	Best Choreography	Nominated
2014	"Turn Down for What" (with DJ Snake)	MTV Clubland Award	Nominated
2014	"Turn Down for What" (with DJ Snake)	Best Direction	Won
2014	"Turn Down for What" (with DJ Snake)	Best Visual Effects	Nominated
2014	"Turn Down for What" (with DJ Snake)	Best Art Direction	Nominated

=== MTV Video Music Awards Japan ===
Year	Nominee / work	Award	Result
2005	"Yeah!" (with Usher and Ludacris)	Video of the Year	Nominated

=== MTV Europe Music Awards ===
Year	Nominee / work	Award	Result
2004	"Yeah!" (with Usher and Ludacris)	Best Song	Nominated

== Filmography ==
=== Film ===
- Soul Plane (2004)
- Boss'n Up (2005)
- Date Movie (2006)
- Scary Movie 4 (2006)

=== Television ===
- Volcano High (2003)
- The Sharon Osbourne Show (2003)
- Mad TV (2003, 2005)
- All of Us (2004)
- Like Family (2004)
- Chappelle's Show (2004)
- How I'm Living (2004)
- The Andy Milonakis Show (2005)
- MTV Cribs (2005)
- Wild 'n Out (2006)
- Criss Angel Mindfreak (2006)
- Pimp My Ride UK (2006)
- Crank Yankers (2007)
- Class of 3000 (2007)
- Robotomy (2010)
- Freaknik: The Musical (2010)
- Ridiculousness (2012)
- The Celebrity Apprentice (2011, 2013)
- The Jenny McCarthy Show (2013)
- Watch What Happens Live with Andy Cohen (2013)
- Master of the Mix (2013)
- The Eric Andre Show (2014)
- About a Boy (2014)
- Saturday Night Live (2014)
- Comedy Bang! Bang! (2015)
- Hell's Kitchen (2016)
- Hollywood Medium with Tyler Henry (2016)
- Talking Dead (2017)
- Tiny House Nation (2017)
- The Bachelorette (2018)
- Bar Rescue (2018)
- Hollywood Puppet Show (2018)
- The Rap Game (2019)
- Lil Jon Wants to Do What? (2022)

=== Video games ===
- Tony Hawk's American Wasteland (2005)
- Def Jam: Icon (2007)

== See also ==
- List of celebrities who own wineries and vineyards
- List of artists who reached number one in the United States
- Honorific nicknames in popular music
- List of best-selling singles
- List of Billboard Hot 100 chart achievements and milestones
