= Don Yute =

- Also known as: Don Yute, The Original Uptown DJ
- Born: Jason Andrew Williams; 9 May 1974 (age 52); Port Antonio
- Origin: Kingston, Jamaica
- Genres: Reggae, Pop, Dancehall, Hip hop, World hop
- Occupation: Singer
- Instrument: Vocals
- Years active: 1995 – present
- Labels: Golden Child Music Group, Capitol Records

Don Yute (born 9 May 1974) is a Jamaican recording artist based in Kingston, Jamaica signed to Golden Child Music Group and specialising in reggae. He is best known for his 1995 collaboration with Wayne Wonder; Sensi Ride.

== Biography ==
=== Early life and careers (1990s) ===
Born Jason Andrew Williams in Port Antonio, Portland, Jamaica, Williams is best known for his 1995 collaboration with Wayne Wonder. He then went on to record "African Thing" with Prezident Brown (released on Island/Mango), the success of which led him to work with producers such as Bobby Digital (Funny, Funny), Donovan Germain (All That Glitters), Steely and Clevie (Hard Core), as well as Grammy Award winning producer Jim Jonsin (who has worked on songs such as "Space Bound", by Eminem and "Lollipop" by Lil' Wayne). He maintained a high profile in Jamaica in the late 1990s with the singles "Gal It Wouldn't Easy", "You Own Di Man", "La La La", "Golden Child" and "Livin' In A Dream". In 1997 he released his debut album. In the same year he appeared at Sting '97 with then newcomer Sean Paul with whom Williams had attended school (Paul considers Williams his mentor). In the later half of the 1990s, the studios that handled Williams' music were delivering thousands of dancehall releases. He attended Wolmer's Schools, where he represented the school in table tennis.

=== Later career and international success (2000s–present) ===
In 2005, Yute signed a deal with Capitol Records.

== Album discography ==
Album title	Year of release	Label
No Parental Guidance	2001	Orcabessa
Adrenalin	2004	Urban Music Group
Golden Child All Stars	2007	Golden Child Music Group

== Chart history ==
- Chart – Billboard R&B/Hip-Hop songs
  - Song – "Row Da Boat" ft. Soundbank Music
    - Featured Artist – Yin Yang Twins
      - Peak Position – No. 94
