= Kings of Crunk =

Studio album by Lil Jon & the East Side Boyz
- Released: October 2002
- Recorded: 2001–2002
- Studio: Stankonia Recording (Atlanta, GA); Soundlabs Studio (Atlanta, GA); Flamingo Studios (Atlanta, GA); The Zone (Atlanta, GA); Patchwerk Studios (Atlanta, GA); Audio Vision Recording (Miami, FL); Liveson Studios (Yonkers, NY); Piety Street Studios (New Orleans, LA); Cotton Row Studios (Memphis, TN); Quad Studios (New York, NY); Streetlight Studios (New York, NY); TMF Studios (New York, NY); The Orange Room; The Den; Doppler Studios
- Genre: Crunk
- Length: 1:17:49
- Label: BME; TVT
- Producer: Lil' Jon

Lil Jon & the East Side Boyz chronology
| Put Yo Hood Up (2001) | Kings of Crunk (2002) | Certified Crunk (2003) |

Singles from Kings of Crunk
- 1. "Play No Games" Released: November 21, 2001; 2. "I Don't Give a Fuck" Released: September 10, 2002; 3. "Get Low" Released: February 18, 2003

Professional ratings
Review scores
| Source | Rating |
|---|---|
| AllMusic | 3/5 stars |
| laut.de | 3/5 stars |
| RapReviews | 6/10 |
| Vibe | 3/5 stars |
| The Village Voice | C |

Kings of Crunk is the fourth studio album by American Southern hip hop group Lil' Jon & the East Side Boyz. It was released in October 2002 through BME Recordings/TVT Records. There are conflicting reports about the album's release date, with different publications claiming it was released on October 8, October 22, or October 29. Recording sessions took place at Stankonia Recording, Soundlabs Studio, Flamingo Studios, The Zone, Patchwerk Recording Studios in Atlanta, at Audio Vision Recording in Miami, at Liveson Studios in Yonkers, at Piety Street Studios in New Orleans, at Cotton Row Studios in Memphis, at Quad Studios, Streetlight Studios and TMF Studios in New York, at The Orange Room, at The Den, and at Doppler Studios. Production was handled solely by Lil' Jon, who also served as executive producer together with Bryan Leach, Emperor Searcy, Rob McDowell and Vince Phillips. It features guest appearances from Oobie, Bun B, Chyna Whyte, 8Ball & MJG, Big Gipp, Bo Hagon, Devin the Dude, E-40, Fat Joe, Jadakiss, Krayzie Bone, Mystikal, Pastor Troy, Petey Pablo, Styles P, Too $hort, Trick Daddy, Ying-Yang Twins, Luke, Pimpin Ken, Pitbull and T.I.

Based on the success of the album's second single "Get Low", Kings of Crunk made the top twenty of the US album chart in September 2003. In the same year, Lil Jon put out a compilation CD and DVD called Part II, which included remixes of "Get Low" featuring Busta Rhymes, Elephant Man and the Ying Yang Twins. The singles "I Don't Give a Fuck" and "Nothin's Free" were released to radio in 2002, while "Play No Games" was released in late 2001 "Get Low" were released to radio in 2003. Also, "Nothin's Free" was released on vinyl, while "I Don't Give a Fuck" and "Get Low" were released on CD. "Play No Games" was also released on vinyl and CD In 2003.

Kings of Crunk debuted at number 15 on the US Billboard 200 chart, selling 71,000 in its first week and as of November 2004, the album has sold 2.2 million copies in the United States. Kings of Crunk was the highest selling independent album for both 2003 and 2004.

== Track listing ==
=== Original release ===
| No. | Title | Writer(s) | Length |
|---|---|---|---|
| 1. | "Kings of Crunk (Intro)" | Jonathan Smith | 1:02 |
| 2. | "Throw It Up" (featuring Pastor Troy) | J. Smith; Sam Norris; Micah Troy; D. Prince; Clint Mansell | 6:12 |
| 3. | "Knockin' Heads Off" (featuring Jadakiss and Styles P) | J. Smith; Norris; Jason Phillips; David Styles; James Phillips; D. Prince | 5:17 |
| 4. | "Pimpin' Ken Speaks (skit)" | | 1:04 |
| 5. | "Bitch" (featuring Chyna Whyte and Too $hort) | J. Smith; Norris; Stephanie Lewis; Todd Shaw | 4:58 |
| 6. | "I Don't Give a Fuck" (featuring Mystikal and Krayzie Bone) | J. Smith; Norris; Michael Tyler; Anthony Henderson | 4:29 |
| 7. | "Rep Yo City" (featuring E-40, Petey Pablo, Bun B, and 8Ball) | J. Smith; Earl Stevens; Moses Barrett; Bernard Freeman; Premro Smith; O. Helton | 5:12 |
| 8. | "Push That Nigga, Push That Hoe" | J. Smith; Norris; D. Prince | 4:25 |
| 9. | "Keep You Chullin Out the Street" (featuring Big Gipp) | J. Smith; Cameron Gipp | 1:55 |
| 10. | "Diamonds" (featuring Bun B and MJG) | J. Smith; Norris; Freeman; Marlon Goodwin; Craig Love; LaMarquis Jefferson; James Phillips | 5:27 |
| 11. | "Weedman (skit)" | | 0:24 |
| 12. | "The Weedman" | | 3:45 |
| 13. | "Nothing On" (featuring Oobie, Chyna Whyte, and Bohagon) | J. Smith; Norris; Tenaia Sanders; Lewis; Cedric Leonard; Love; Jefferson; James Phillips | 5:07 |
| 14. | "Luke Talkin Shit" | | 0:25 |
| 15. | "Ooh Na Na Naa Naa" (featuring Oobie and Devin the Dude) | J. Smith; Norris; Sanders; Devin Copeland; Love; Jefferson; James Phillips | 4:49 |
| 16. | "Nothins Free" (featuring Oobie) | J. Smith; Norris; Sanders; Love | 4:22 |
| 17. | "Play No Games" (featuring Fat Joe, Trick Daddy, and Oobie) | J. Smith; Norris; Joseph Cartagena; Maurice Young; George Duke | 4:12 |
| 18. | "Pitbulls Cuban Rideout" (featuring Pitbull) | J. Smith | 1:37 |
| 19. | "Get Low" (featuring Ying Yang Twins) | J. Smith; Norris; Eric Jackson; Deongelo Holmes | 5:34 |
| 20. | "T.I.P." | | 0:35 |
| 21. | "BME Click" (featuring The BME Allstars) | J. Smith; Norris; Wendell Neal; Love | 6:58 |
| Total length: | | | 1:17:49 |

Sample credits

- "Throw It Up" contains replayed elements from "Summer Overture", written by Clint Mansell.
- "Play No Games" contains replayed elements from "Dukey Stick", written by George Duke.

=== Special edition ===
Disc 1
| No. | Title | Length |
|---|---|---|
| 1. | "Kings of Crunk (Intro)" | 1:02 |
| 2. | "Throw It Up" (featuring Pastor Troy) | 6:13 |
| 3. | "Knockin' Heads Off" (featuring Jadakiss and Styles P) | 5:17 |
| 4. | "Pimpin' Ken Speaks (skit)" | 1:04 |
| 5. | "Bitch" (featuring Chyna Whyte and Too Short) | 4:58 |
| 6. | "I Don't Give a Fuck" (featuring Mystikal and Krayzie Bone) | 4:29 |
| 7. | "Rep Your City" (featuring E-40, Petey Pablo, Bun B, and Eightball) | 5:12 |
| 8. | "Push That Nigga, Push That Hoe" | 4:25 |
| 9. | "Keep Yo Chullin Out the Streets" (featuring Big Gipp) | 1:55 |
| 10. | "Diamonds" (featuring Bun B and MJG) | 5:27 |
| 11. | "Weedman (skit)" | 0:24 |
| 12. | "The Weedman" | 3:45 |
| 13. | "Nothing On" (featuring Oobie, Chyna Whyte, and Bo Hagon) | 5:07 |
| 14. | "Luke Talkin Shit" | 0:25 |
| 15. | "Ooh Na Na Naa Naa" (featuring Oobie and Devin the Dude) | 4:49 |
| 16. | "Nothins Free" (featuring Oobie) | 4:22 |
| 17. | "Play No Games" (featuring Fat Joe, Trick Daddy, and Oobie) | 4:12 |
| 18. | "Pitbulls Cuban Rideout" (featuring Pitbull) | 1:37 |
| 19. | "Get Low" (featuring Ying Yang Twins) | 5:34 |
| 20. | "T.I.P." | 0:35 |
| 21. | "Get Low (Remix)" (featuring Ying Yang Twins, Elephant Man, and Busta Rhymes) | 5:09 |
| 22. | "Yeah!" (performed by Usher featuring Lil Jon and Ludacris) | 4:11 |

Disc 2
| No. | Title | Length |
|---|---|---|
| 1. | "Get Low (Merengue Mix)" (featuring Pitbull) | 4:02 |
| 2. | "Get Your Weight Up" (featuring 8Ball and T.I.) | 4:40 |
| 3. | "Throw It Up (Remix)" (featuring Pastor Troy and Young Buck) | 6:14 |
| 4. | "Put Yo Hood Up (Remix)" (featuring Chyna Whyte, Jadakiss, Petey Pablo, and Roy Jones, Jr.) | 5:10 |
| 5. | "What They Want" (performed by Chyna White featuring Ying Yang Twins) | 3:34 |
| 6. | "Dirty Dancin'" (performed by Oobie featuring Lil Jon and the East Side Boyz) | 5:19 |

== Charts ==
=== Weekly charts ===
| Chart (2002–2004) | Peak position |
|---|---|
| Australian Albums (ARIA) | 93 |
| US Billboard 200 | 14 |
| US Top R&B/Hip-Hop Albums (Billboard) | 2 |
| US Independent Albums (Billboard) | 1 |

=== Year-end charts ===
| Chart (2003) | Position |
|---|---|
| US Billboard 200 | 49 |
| US Top R&B/Hip-Hop Albums (Billboard) | 4 |

| Chart (2004) | Position |
|---|---|
| US Billboard 200 | 81 |
| US Top R&B/Hip-Hop Albums (Billboard) | 44 |

== Certifications ==
| Region | Certification | Certified units/sales |
|---|---|---|
| New Zealand (RMNZ) | Gold | 7,500^{‡} |
| United States (RIAA) | 2× Platinum | 2,000,000^{^} |
^{^} Shipments figures based on certification alone.^{‡} Sales+streaming figures based on certification alone.
