= Crunk =

Music genre

- Stylistic origins: Southern hip-hop; Miami bass; bounce; gangsta rap; Memphis rap
- Cultural origins: Early 1990s, Memphis and Atlanta, United States
- Typical instruments: Guitar, bass synth, Roland TR-808, synthesizers
- Derivative forms: Jersey Club; trap

Subgenres
- Snap

Fusion genres
- Wonky; crunkcore

Other topics
- Hyphy

Crunk is a subgenre of hip-hop that emerged in the early 1990s and gained mainstream success during the mid 2000s. Crunk is often up-tempo and one of Southern hip-hop's more dance and club oriented subgenres. An archetypal crunk track frequently uses a main groove consisting of layered keyboard synths, a drum machine clapping rhythm, heavy basslines, and shouting vocals, often in a call and response manner. The term "crunk" was also used throughout the 2000s as a blanket term to denote any style of Southern hip-hop, a side effect of the genre's breakthrough to the mainstream. The word derives from its African-American Vernacular English past-participle form, "crunk", of the verb "to crank" (as in the phrase "crank up"). It refers to being excited or high on drugs.

== Etymology ==
The term has been attributed mainly to African-American slang, in which it holds various meanings. It most commonly refers to the verb phrase "to crank up". It is theorized that the use of the term came from a past-tense form of "crank", which was sometimes conjugated as "crunk" in the South, such that if a person, event, or party was hyped-up, i.e., energetic—‌"cranked" or "cranked up"—‌it was said to be "crunk".

In publications, "crunk" can be traced back to 1972 in the Dr. Seuss book Marvin K. Mooney Will You Please Go Now!. He uses the term "Crunk-Car" without any given definition. The term has also been traced to usage in the 1980s coming out of Atlanta, Georgia nightclubs and meaning being "full of energy" or "hyped". In the mid-1990s, crunk was variously defined either as "hype", "phat", or "pumped up". Rolling Stone magazine published "glossary of Dirty South slang", where to crunk was defined as "to get excited".

Outkast has been attributed as the first artist to use the term in mainstream music, in the 1993 track "Player's Ball". A seminal year for the genre was 1996, with the releases of Three 6 Mafia album Chapter 1: The End (featuring "Gette'm Crunk"), and Memphis-based underground hip-hop artist Tommy Wright III's album On the Run, which featured the Project Pimp track "Getting Crunk".

Artist Lil Jon was instrumental in bringing the term further into the mainstream with his 1997 album titled Get Crunk, Who U Wit: Da Album. He later released other songs and albums using the term, and has been credited by other artists and musicians as galvanizing use of the term as well as mainstreaming the music genre itself.

Lil Jon further popularized the word with his 2004 album Crunk Juice, and has been credited with inventing the potent alcoholic cocktail by that name. This use of "crunk" became synonymous with the meaning "crazy drunk". Non-alcoholic drinks, to which alcohol could be added, were manufactured and marketed under the Crunk brand name, with Lil Jon as spokesman.

The term has continued to evolve, taking on a negative stigma with police, parents and the media. In 2011, the company which manufactured "Crunk" drink brought out an alcoholic version named "Crunk Juice".

== Musical characteristics ==
Musically, crunk borrows heavily from Miami bass, bounce and 1980s-era call-and-response hip-hop. Heavy use of synthesized instruments and sparse, truncated 808 handclaps are staples of the crunk sound. Looped, stripped-down drum machine claps and bass drum rhythms are usually used. The Roland TR-808 and 909 are among the most popular. The drum machines are usually accompanied by simple, repeated synthesizer melodies in the form of ostinato, to create a hypnotic effect, and heavy bass stabs. The tempo of Lil Jon's "Get Crunk" is 78 BPM.

The focal point of crunk is more often the beats and music than the lyrics therein. Crunk rappers, such as Lil Jon, however, often shout and scream their lyrics, creating a heavy, aggressive style of hip-hop. These lyrics can often be isolated to simple chants ("Where you from?" and "You can't fuck with me" are common examples). While other subgenres of hip-hop address sociopolitical or personal concerns, crunk is almost exclusively party music, favoring call and response slogans in lieu of more substantive approaches.

== History ==
=== Origins ===
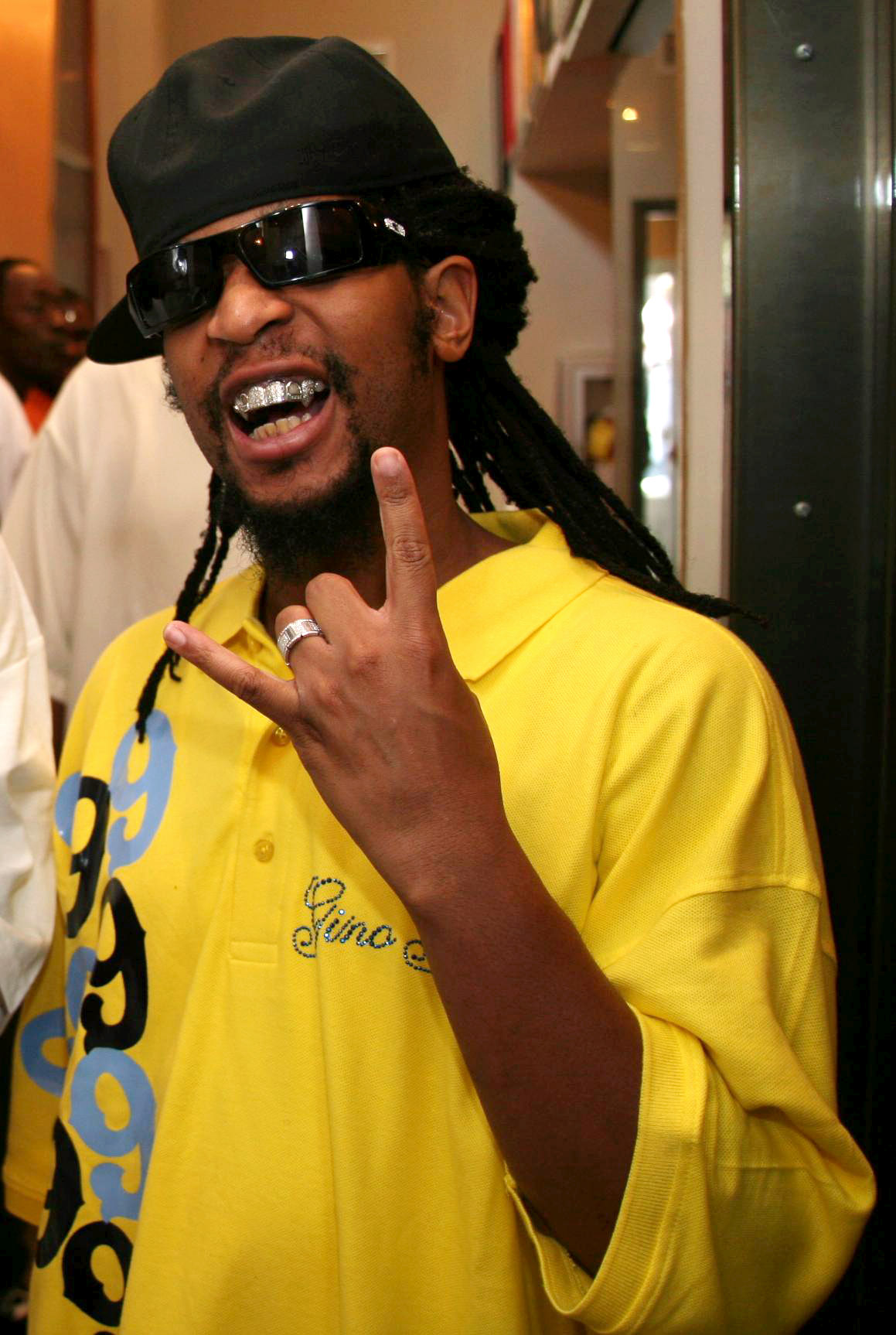
Lil Jon is one of crunk's most prominent figures.

Crunk music arose from Miami bass music before 1996 in the southern United States, particularly in African American strip clubs of Memphis, Tennessee. Memphis-based hip-hop group Three 6 Mafia were "instrumental for the emergence of the crunk style" in the mid-to-late 1990s. Two mixtape DJs from Memphis, DJ Paul and Juicy J, started making their original music, which was distinctive with its "spare, low-BPM rhythms, simplistic chants... and narcotically repetitive, slasher-flick textures". This duo soon became known as Three 6 Mafia. Frequently featuring rappers such as Project Pat, Lord Infamous, Gangsta Boo, and La Chat on their releases, they became instrumental in the formation of crunk music.

In 1997, in Atlanta, Lil Jon, with his group the East Side Boyz, released their first album titled Get Crunk, Who U Wit. These were the first of six albums released by Lil Jon and the East Side Boyz. The New York Times denied that Get Crunk, Who Are You With was the first crunk album ever. He was one of the key figures in popularizing crunk during 1998 and 1999, and produced two gold records independently, before signing to TVT Records in 2001. After being named the "King of Crunk", Lil Jon went on to make collaborations with many popular artists such as Snoop Dogg, Ice Cube, Ludacris and Britney Spears. Nevertheless, crunk was not exclusively associated with Lil Jon and Three 6 Mafia. In its early stages, such artists as Ying Yang Twins, White Dawg, Bone Crusher, Lil Scrappy, Trillville, YoungBloodZ and Pastor Troy from Atlanta, and David Banner from Mississippi also helped to popularize crunk music.

=== Popularity and evolution ===
In the early to mid-2000s, some crunk music hits like "Get Low", "Goodies", "Yeah!" and "Freek-a-Leek" produced by Lil Jon climbed to the top 10 of the Billboard Hot 100 charts. Other hits produced by Lil Jon included "Okay", "Cyclone", "Girlfight", "U and Dat" and "Touch". "Yeah!" and "Goodies" were the first tracks to introduce the substyle of crunk music and contemporary R&B, called crunk&B, to the public. Those two tracks (performed by Usher and Ciara, respectively) topped the Billboard Hot 100 in 2004.

The song "Get Low" (2003), performed by Lil Jon & the East Side Boyz with the Ying Yang Twins, is credited as the track which put crunk music into the national spotlight. "Get Low" reached the number two position on the Billboard Hot 100 music chart; overall, it spent more than 21 weeks in the charts. Though rappers not from the Southern US had tended to avoid being associated with Southern hip-hop music before, Busta Rhymes and Nelly accepted offers to perform on remixes of "Get Low". Lil Jon's album, titled Kings of Crunk, which contains "Get Low", became double platinum.

In 2004, independent label Crunk Incorporated signed a major distribution deal with Reprise/Warner Bros. Records for the crunk group Crime Mob, who released the platinum single "Knuck If You Buck". They followed this with their 2006 hit, "Rock Yo Hips". In March 2004, R&B singer Houston released his crunk&B hit "I Like That", which reached number 11 on the Billboard Hot 100. In 2005, crunk&B reached the Billboard Hot 100 number one position with the song "Run It!", performed by Chris Brown. In 2005 and 2006, crunk and crunk&B conquered the American R&B charts (and other charts specializing in music with rapping) and replaced hip-hop and older styles of contemporary R&B. Atlanta R&B group Cherish also gained prominence with their summer 2006 song "Do It to It" where the song debuted at number 86 on the Billboard Hot 100 for the week of May 20, 2006, later peaking at number 12 for the week of September 2, 2006, and staying on the charts for 21 weeks.

The growing interest in crunk music among music producers outside the Southern hip-hop scene led to the development of various subgenres of crunk, including Eurocrunk, crunkcore, crunkczar, aquacrunk, acid crunk and most recently, trap music. By the end of 2009, crunk had seen a relative decline in mainstream American music, mostly due to the rising popularity of the trap and drill music subgenres as well as electropop and EDM. In 2015, American singer Tinashe incorporated crunk elements in her single "All Hands on Deck" featuring Iggy Azalea. The song contains themes of girl power and self empowerment. In 2019, rapper Saweetie sampled Petey Pablo's 2004 crunk hit "Freek-a-Leek" for her song "My Type".

== See also ==
- Trap music
- Bounce music
- Gangsta rap
- G-funk
- Snap music
- Drill music
