= Big Kap =

American hip hop DJ (1970–2016)

- Also known as: Big Kap; The Wardin
- Born: Keith Carter; February 26, 1970; New York City, U.S.
- Died: February 3, 2016 (aged 45)
- Genre: Hip hop
- Occupations: DJ; rapper; producer; actor; radio station host
- Years active: 1995–2016

Keith Carter (February 26, 1970 – February 3, 2016), also known as Big Kap and The Wardin, was an American hip-hop DJ who was born in New York City and was later based in Atlanta.

== Career ==
In 1995 he was a member of hip hop supergroup The Flip Squad. He was well known for the 1999 album The Tunnel with Funkmaster Flex, named after the New York nightclub where he was a regular DJ. He died in Mableton, GA late on February 3, 2016, due to a heart attack. He was 45 at the time of his death. According to his road manager Ab Traxx, Carter had diabetes, which he did not believe was what caused his fatal heart attack. Carter was previously scheduled to work on a showcase in Atlanta on the day he died. Shortly after his death, the event became a memorial for Carter.

Big Kap is also well known for a video that went viral in 2011 consisting of Notorious B.I.G. throwing a water bottle at Big Kap during a Summer Jam concert before storming off the stage in 1995.

== Discography ==
- The Tunnel (1999)
