= List of number-one digital albums of 2013 (Australia) =

ARIA Charts number-one digital albums of 2013 < 2012 2014 >

Other Australian number-one charts of 2013
- albums
- singles
- urban singles
- dance singles
- club tracks
- digital tracks
- streaming tracks

Top Australian singles and albums of 2013
- Triple J Hottest 100
- top 25 singles
- top 25 albums

The ARIA Albums Chart ranks the best-performing albums and extended plays (EPs) in Australia. Its data, published by the Australian Recording Industry Association, is based collectively on the weekly digital sales of albums and EPs.

== Chart history ==
Date	Album	Artist(s)	Ref.
7 January	+	Ed Sheeran	
14 January	+	Ed Sheeran	
21 January	The Heist	Macklemore & Ryan Lewis	
28 January	The Heist	Macklemore & Ryan Lewis	
4 February	Flume	Flume	
11 February	Flume	Flume	
18 February	Holy Fire	Foals	
25 February	Push the Sky Away	Nick Cave & The Bad Seeds	
4 March	Zion	Hillsong United	
11 March	March Fires	Birds of Tokyo	
18 March	The Next Day	David Bowie	
25 March	The 20/20 Experience	Justin Timberlake	
1 April	All the Little Lights	Passenger	
8 April	Sempiternal	Bring Me the Horizon	
15 April	All the Little Lights	Passenger	
22 April	To Be Loved	Michael Bublé	
29 April	Bankrupt!	Phoenix	
6 May	Universus	ShockOne	
13 May	Home	Rudimental	
20 May	The Great Gatsby: Music from Baz Luhrmann's Film	Various Artists	
27 May	Random Access Memories	Daft Punk	
3 June	Random Access Memories	Daft Punk	
10 June	The Great Gatsby: Music from Baz Luhrmann's Film	Various Artists	
17 June	Departures	Bernard Fanning	
24 June	Yeezus	Kanye West	
1 July	More Than a Dream	Harrison Craig	
8 July	Circus in the Sky	Bliss n Eso	
15 July	Magna Carta Holy Grail	Jay-Z	
22 July	Magna Carta Holy Grail	Jay-Z	
29 July	Asymmetry	Karnivool	
5 August	All The Little Lights	Passenger	
12 August	King Amongst Many	Horrorshow	
19 August	Atlas	Rüfüs	
26 August	Harlequin Dream	Boy & Bear	
2 September	Paradise Valley	John Mayer	
9 September	Yours Truly	Ariana Grande	
16 September	AM	Arctic Monkeys	
23 September	True	Avicii	
30 September	Nothing Was the Same	Drake	
7 October	Pure Heroine	Lorde	
14 October	Bangerz	Miley Cyrus	
21 October	Lightning Bolt	Pearl Jam	
28 October	Triple J's Like a Version Volume 9	Various Artists	
4 November	Prism	Katy Perry	
11 November	The Marshall Mathers LP 2	Eminem	
18 November	Artpop	Lady Gaga	
25 November	Dami Im	Dami Im	
2 December	Midnight Memories	One Direction	
9 December	Taylor Henderson	Taylor Henderson	
16 December	Christmas	Michael Bublé	
23 December	Beyoncé	Beyoncé	
30 December	Christmas	Michael Bublé	

== Number-one artists ==
Position	Artist	Weeks at No. 1
1	Michael Bublé	3
1	Passenger	3
2	Daft Punk	2
2	Ed Sheeran	2
2	Flume	2
2	Jay-Z	2
2	Macklemore & Ryan Lewis	2
3	Arctic Monkeys	1
3	Ariana Grande	1
3	Avicii	1
3	Bernard Fanning	1
3	Beyoncé	1
3	Birds of Tokyo	1
3	Bliss n Eso	1
3	Boy & Bear	1
3	Bring Me the Horizon	1
3	Dami Im	1
3	David Bowie	1
3	Drake	1
3	Eminem	1
3	Foals	1
3	Harrison Craig	1
3	Hillsong United	1
3	Horrorshow	1
3	John Mayer	1
3	Justin Timberlake	1
3	Karnivool	1
3	Kanye West	1
3	Katy Perry	1
3	Lorde	1
3	Miley Cyrus	1
3	Nick Cave & the Bad Seeds	1
3	One Direction	1
3	Pearl Jam	1
3	Phoenix	1
3	Rudimental	1
3	Rüfüs	1
3	ShockOne	1

== See also ==
- 2013 in music
- ARIA Charts
- List of number-one singles of 2013 (Australia)
