= List of number-one country albums of 2013 (Australia) =

ARIA Charts number-one country albums of 2013 < 2012 2014 >

Other Australian number-one charts of 2013
- albums
- singles
- urban singles
- dance singles
- club tracks
- digital tracks
- streaming tracks

Top Australian singles and albums of 2013
- Triple J Hottest 100
- top 25 singles
- top 25 albums

These are the Australian Country number-one albums of 2013, per the ARIA Charts.

Issue date	Album	Artist
7 January	Red	Taylor Swift
14 January	Red	Taylor Swift
21 January	Red	Taylor Swift
28 January	Red	Taylor Swift
4 February	Red	Taylor Swift
11 February	The Story So Far	Keith Urban
18 February	Two Lanes of Freedom	Tim McGraw
25 February	Red	Taylor Swift
4 March	Red	Taylor Swift
11 March	Red	Taylor Swift
18 March	Red	Taylor Swift
25 March	Red	Taylor Swift
1 April	So Country 2013	Various artists
8 April	So Country 2013	Various artists
15 April	So Country 2013	Various artists
22 April	Wheelhouse	Brad Paisley
29 April	So Country 2013	Various artists
6 May	Life is a Highway	Jason Owen
13 May	Life is a Highway	Jason Owen
20 May	Golden	Lady Antebellum
27 May	Golden	Lady Antebellum
3 June	Golden	Lady Antebellum
10 June	Wrote a Song For Everyone	John Fogerty
17 June	Wrote a Song For Everyone	John Fogerty
24 June	The Great Country Songbook	Troy Cassar-Daley & Adam Harvey
1 July	The Great Country Songbook	Troy Cassar-Daley & Adam Harvey
8 July	The Great Country Songbook	Troy Cassar-Daley & Adam Harvey
15 July	The Great Country Songbook	Troy Cassar-Daley & Adam Harvey
22 July	The Great Country Songbook	Troy Cassar-Daley & Adam Harvey
29 July	The Great Country Songbook	Troy Cassar-Daley & Adam Harvey
5 August	The Great Country Songbook	Troy Cassar-Daley & Adam Harvey
12 August	The Great Country Songbook	Troy Cassar-Daley & Adam Harvey
19 August	The Great Country Songbook	Troy Cassar-Daley & Adam Harvey
26 August	The Great Country Songbook	Troy Cassar-Daley & Adam Harvey
2 September	The Great Country Songbook	Troy Cassar-Daley & Adam Harvey
9 September	The Great Country Songbook	Troy Cassar-Daley & Adam Harvey
16 September	The Great Country Songbook	Troy Cassar-Daley & Adam Harvey
23 September	Fuse	Keith Urban
30 September	Fuse	Keith Urban
7 October	Fuse	Keith Urban
14 October	Fuse	Keith Urban
21 October	Fuse	Keith Urban
28 October	Fuse	Keith Urban
4 November	Fuse	Keith Urban
11 November	Fuse	Keith Urban
18 November	My Acoustic Diary	Adam Brand
25 November	The Great Country Songbook	Troy Cassar-Daley & Adam Harvey
2 December	Fuse	Keith Urban
9 December	Red	Taylor Swift
16 December	Red	Taylor Swift
23 December	Fuse	Keith Urban
30 December	Fuse	Keith Urban

== See also ==
- 2013 in music
- List of number-one albums of 2013 (Australia)
