= List of number-one urban albums of 2013 (Australia) =

ARIA Charts number-one urban albums of 2013 < 2012 2014 >

Other Australian number-one charts of 2013
- albums
- singles
- urban singles
- dance singles
- club tracks
- digital tracks
- streaming tracks

Top Australian singles and albums of 2013
- Triple J Hottest 100
- top 25 singles
- top 25 albums

This is a list of albums that reached number-one on the ARIA Urban Albums Chart in 2013. The ARIA Urban Albums Chart is a weekly chart that ranks the best-performing urban albums in Australia. It is published by the Australian Recording Industry Association (ARIA), an organisation that collects music data for the weekly ARIA Charts. To be eligible to appear on the chart, the recording must be an album of a predominantly urban nature.

== Chart history ==
Issue date	Album	Artist(s)	Reference
7 January	The Heist	Macklemore & Ryan Lewis	
14 January	The Heist	Macklemore & Ryan Lewis	
21 January	The Heist	Macklemore & Ryan Lewis	
28 January	The Heist	Macklemore & Ryan Lewis	
4 February	The Heist	Macklemore & Ryan Lewis	
11 February	The Heist	Macklemore & Ryan Lewis	
18 February	The Heist	Macklemore & Ryan Lewis	
25 February	The Heist	Macklemore & Ryan Lewis	
4 March	The Heist	Macklemore & Ryan Lewis	
11 March	The Heist	Macklemore & Ryan Lewis	
18 March	The Heist	Macklemore & Ryan Lewis	
25 March	The Heist	Macklemore & Ryan Lewis	
1 April	The Heist	Macklemore & Ryan Lewis	
8 April	The Heist	Macklemore & Ryan Lewis	
15 April	The 20/20 Experience	Justin Timberlake	
22 April	The Heist	Macklemore & Ryan Lewis	
29 April	The Heist	Macklemore & Ryan Lewis	
6 May	The 20/20 Experience	Justin Timberlake	
13 May	The Heist	Macklemore & Ryan Lewis	
20 May	The 20/20 Experience	Justin Timberlake	
27 May	The Heist	Macklemore & Ryan Lewis	
3 June	The Heist	Macklemore & Ryan Lewis	
10 June	The Heist	Macklemore & Ryan Lewis	
17 June	The Heist	Macklemore & Ryan Lewis	
24 June	Yeezus	Kanye West	
1 July	Yeezus	Kanye West	
8 July	Circus in the Sky	Bliss n Eso	
15 July	Magna Carta Holy Grail	Jay-Z	
22 July	Magna Carta Holy Grail	Jay-Z	
29 July	Circus in the Sky	Bliss n Eso	
5 August	Circus in the Sky	Bliss n Eso	
12 August	King Amongst Many	Horrorshow	
19 August	Circus in the Sky	Bliss n Eso	
26 August	Circus in the Sky	Bliss n Eso	
2 September	Circus in the Sky	Bliss n Eso	
9 September	Circus in the Sky	Bliss n Eso	
16 September	Love in the Future	John Legend	
23 September	Telling Scenes	Mantra	
30 September	Nothing Was the Same	Drake	
7 October	The 20/20 Experience – 2 of 2	Justin Timberlake	
14 October	Nothing Was the Same	Drake	
21 October	Nothing Was the Same	Drake	
28 October	Nothing Was the Same	Drake	
4 November	S.C.O.T.	Kerser	
11 November	The Marshall Mathers LP 2	Eminem	
18 November	The Marshall Mathers LP 2	Eminem	
25 November	The Marshall Mathers LP 2	Eminem	
2 December	The Marshall Mathers LP 2	Eminem	
9 December	The Marshall Mathers LP 2	Eminem	
16 December	The Marshall Mathers LP 2	Eminem	
23 December	Beyoncé	Beyoncé	
30 December	Beyoncé	Beyoncé	

== See also ==
- 2013 in music
- List of number-one albums of 2013 (Australia)
