= Redfoo discography =

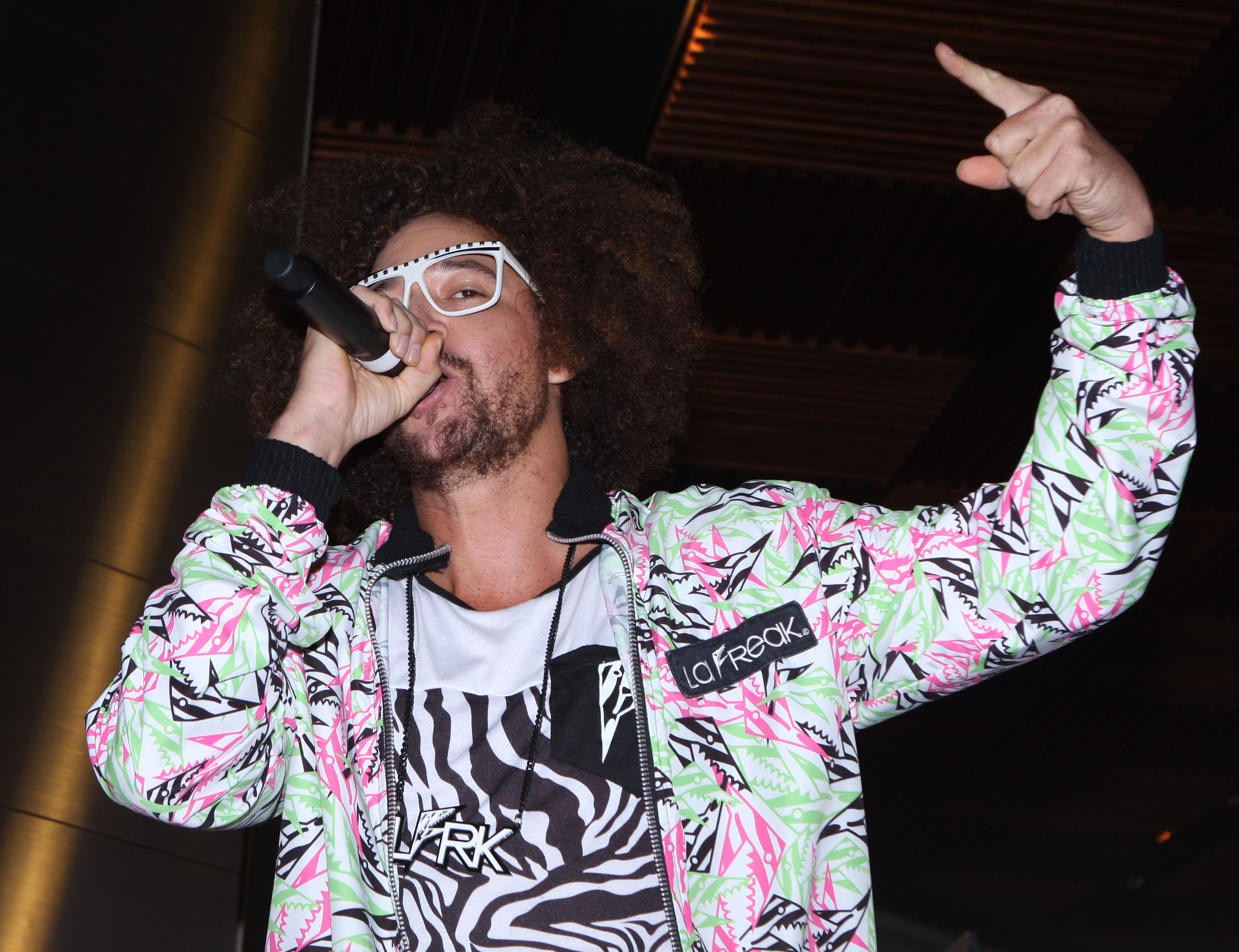
- Redfoo performing in 2014.
- Studio albums: 2
- Singles: 11
- Music videos: 8
- Promotional singles: 5

The discography of Redfoo, an American rapper, singer and songwriter, consists of two studio albums, eleven singles, five promotional singles, eight music videos and other album appearances. He formed the duo with his nephew Sky Blu in 2006 and they released two studio albums, before going on an indefinite hiatus in 2012. He is the youngest son of Motown Record Corporation founder Berry Gordy, Jr.

== Albums ==
=== Studio albums ===
List of albums
Title	Album details	Peak chart positions		
Title	Album details	US Dance	AUS	BEL (Fl)
Balance Beam (with Dre Kroon)	Released: October 10, 1997; Formats: CD, digital download; Label: Bubonic	—	—	—
Party Rock Mansion	Release: March 18, 2016; Formats: CD, LP, digital download; Label: Party Rock Records	8	172	158
"—" denotes releases that did not chart or were not released in that territory.

== Singles ==
=== As lead artist ===
List of singles as lead artist, with selected chart positions and certifications
Title	Year	Peak chart positions									Certifications	Album
Title	Year	US Dance	US Rap	AUS	BEL (Fl)	BEL (Wa)	FIN	FRA	NL	NZ	Certifications	Album
"Life Is a Game of Chess" (with Dre Kroon)	1997	—	—	—	—	—	—	—	—	—		Balance Beam
"The Freshest" (with Dre Kroon)	1997	—	50	—	—	—	—	—	—	—		Balance Beam
"Bring Out the Bottles"	2012	—	—	—	62	52	30	—	86	—		Non-album singles
"I'll Award You with My Body"	2013	—	—	58	—	76	—	—	—	—		Non-album singles
"Let's Get Ridiculous"	2013	48	—	1	31	49	—	106	97	31	ARIA: 4× Platinum	Non-album singles
"New Thang"	2014	47	—	3	—	85	18	78	—	3	RMNZ: Platinum	Party Rock Mansion
"Juicy Wiggle"	2015	29	—	35	—	—	—	—	—	—		Party Rock Mansion
"Party Train"	2016	—	—	—	—	—	—	—	—	—		Party Rock Mansion
"Brand New Day"	2017	—	—	—	—	—	—	—	—	—		Non-album singles
"Sock It to Ya"	2017	—	—	—	—	—	—	—	—	—		Non-album singles
"Everything I Need" (with Vinai)	2018	—	—	—	—	—	—	—	—	—		Non-album singles
"Long Live Party Rock" (with Dainjazone)	2023	—	—	—	—	—	—	—	—	—		Non-album singles
"—" denotes releases that did not chart or were not released in that territory.

=== As featured artist ===
List of singles as featured artist, with selected chart positions
Title	Year	Peak chart positions										Certifications	Album
Title	Year	US	US Rap	AUS	CAN	GER	IRL	NZ	SWE	SWI	UK	Certifications	Album
"I Gotta Know" (Figgkidd featuring Tech N9ne and Redfoo)	2004	—	—	50	—	—	—	—	—	—	—		Who Is Figgkidd?
"Live My Life (Party Rock Remix)" (Far East Movement featuring Justin Bieber and Redfoo)	2012	21	—	14	4	8	6	15	13	6	7	ARIA: Platinum; RMNZ: Gold	Dirty Bass
"Drop Girl" (Ice Cube featuring Redfoo and 2 Chainz)	2014	—	22	—	—	92	—	—	—	—	—		Non-album singles
"Literally I Can't" (Play-N-Skillz featuring Redfoo, Lil Jon and Enertia McFly)	2014	—	—	—	—	—	—	—	—	—	—		Non-album singles
"Holiday" (HRVY featuring Redfoo)	2017	—	—	—	—	—	—	—	—	—	—		Holiday
"—" denotes releases that did not chart or were not released in that territory.

== Promotional singles ==
List of promotional singles, showing year released and album name
Title	Year	Album
"Like Ya Just Don't Care"	2014	Non-album single
"Where the Sun Goes" (featuring Stevie Wonder)	2015	Party Rock Mansion
"Booty Man"	2015	Party Rock Mansion
"Lights Out"	2016	Party Rock Mansion
"Meet Her at Tomorrow" (featuring Dimitri Vegas & Like Mike)	2016	Party Rock Mansion

== Other charted songs ==
List of songs, with selected chart positions, showing year released and album name
Title	Year	Peak chart positions		Album
Title	Year	AUS	CAN	Album
"Run" (Flo Rida featuring Redfoo)	2012	44	29	Wild Ones

== Other appearances ==
Title	Year	Other(s) artist(s)	Album
"Duet"	1998	Black Eyed Peas	Behind the Front
"Took My Love"	2011	Pitbull, Vein and David Rush	Planet Pit
"Run"	2012	Flo Rida	Wild Ones
"Run to You"	2012	Flo Rida, T-Pain and Sky Blu	Wild Ones

== Production and songwriter discography ==
Title	Year	Artist(s)	Album	Notes
"Back in the Day"	1994	Ahmad	Ahmad	Producer
"Touch the Ceiling"	1994	Ahmad	Ahmad	Producer
"The Jones'"	1994	Ahmad	Ahmad	Producer
"You Gotta Be..."	1994	Ahmad	Ahmad	Producer
"We Want the Funk"	1994	Ahmad	Ahmad	Producer
"The Palladium"	1994	Ahmad	Ahmad	Producer
"Homeboys First"	1994	Ahmad	Ahmad	Producer
"Ordinary People"	1994	Ahmad	Ahmad	Producer
"Intro"	1999	Defari	Focused Daily	Engineer
"Focused Daily"	1999	Defari	Focused Daily	Engineer
"Never Lose Touch"	1999	Defari	Focused Daily	Engineer
"Keep It On The Rise"	1999	Defari	Focused Daily	Engineer
"Lowlands Anthem, Pt. 1"	1999	Defari	Focused Daily	Engineer
"Bionic"	1999	Defari	Focused Daily	Engineer
"Likwit Connection"	1999	Defari	Focused Daily	Engineer
"Yes Indeed"	1999	Defari	Focused Daily	Engineer
"Killing Spree"	1999	Defari	Focused Daily	Engineer
"These Dreams"	1999	Defari	Focused Daily	Engineer
"Juggle Me (For The DJ's)"	1999	Defari	Focused Daily	Engineer
"Thunder & Lightning"	1999	Defari	Focused Daily	Engineer
"405 Friday's"	1999	Defari	Focused Daily	Engineer
"Checkstand 3"	1999	Defari	Focused Daily	Engineer
"No Clue"	1999	Defari	Focused Daily	Engineer
"Gems"	1999	Defari	Focused Daily	Engineer
"People's Choice"	1999	Defari	Focused Daily	Engineer
"Took My Love"	2011	Pitbull	Planet Pit	Songwriter and producer
"Run"	2012	Flo Rida	Wild Ones	Songwriter
"More Than a Memory"	2012	Carly Rae Jepsen	Kiss	Producer
"This Kiss"	2012	Carly Rae Jepsen	Kiss	Songwriter and producer
"Wrong Feels So Right"	2012	Carly Rae Jepsen	Kiss	Songwriter
"King Kunta"	2015	Kendrick Lamar	To Pimp a Butterfly	Songwriter
