= List of top 10 singles for 2013 in Australia =

This is a list of singles that charted in the top ten of the ARIA Charts in 2013.

== Top-ten singles ==
Key

Symbol	Meaning
◁	Indicates single's top 10 entry was also its ARIA top 50 debut
(#)	2013 Year-end top 10 single position and rank

List of ARIA top ten singles that peaked in 2013
Top ten entry date	Single	Artist(s)	Peak	Peak date	Weeks in top ten	References
Singles from 2012
17 December	"I Love It"	Icona Pop featuring Charli XCX	3	7 January	9	
24 December	"Beneath Your Beautiful"	Labrinth featuring Emeli Sandé	5	4 March	9	
Singles from 2013
14 January	"Same Love"	Macklemore & Ryan Lewis featuring Mary Lambert	1	21 January	10	
14 January	"When I Was Your Man"	Bruno Mars	6	14 January	8	
14 January	"Ho Hey"	The Lumineers	3	28 January	6	
21 January	"Let It Roll"	Flo Rida	7	21 January	1	
28 January	"Suit & Tie" ◁	Justin Timberlake featuring Jay Z	9	28 January	1	
28 January	"Lanterns" ◁	Birds of Tokyo	3	11 February	6	
4 February	"Impossible" (#10)	James Arthur	2	11 February	12	
11 February	"Get Up (Rattle)" ◁	Bingo Players featuring Far East Movement	4	18 February	3	
11 February	"Just Give Me a Reason" (#6) ◁	Pink featuring Nate Ruess	1	18 February	11	
18 February	"Everybody Talks"	Neon Trees	10	18 February	1	
18 February	"Stay"	Rihanna featuring Mikky Ekko	4	4 March	7	
25 February	"One Way or Another (Teenage Kicks)" ◁	One Direction	3	25 February	2	
25 February	"Harlem Shake" ◁	Baauer	1	25 February	4	
4 March	"I Could Be the One"	Avicii and Nicky Romero	4	11 March	5	
4 March	"Feel This Moment"	Pitbull featuring Christina Aguilera	6	11 March	7	
11 March	"Can't Hold Us" (#9)	Macklemore & Ryan Lewis featuring Ray Dalton	1	25 March	12	
18 March	"Thank You"	MKTO	2	8 April	9	
18 March	"Hey Porsche"	Nelly	5	8 April	6	
25 March	"I Need Your Love"	Calvin Harris featuring Ellie Goulding	3	29 April	8	
25 March	"Let Her Go" (#3)	Passenger	1	1 April	15	
8 April	"Hello"	Stafford Brothers featuring Lil Wayne and Christina Milan	4	15 April	4	
8 April	"Change Your Life"	Little Mix	8	15 April	4	
22 April	"Pompeii"	Bastille	4	27 May	11	
29 April	"Still Into You"	Paramore	5	6 May	6	
29 April	"The Other Side" ◁	Jason Derulo	4	13 May	7	
29 April	"Get Lucky" (#7) ◁	Daft Punk featuring Pharrell Williams	1	6 May	10	
6 May	"Mirrors"	Justin Timberlake	10	6 May	1	
6 May	"Blurred Lines" (#2)	Robin Thicke featuring Pharrell Williams and T.I.	1	13 May	14	
13 May	"#thatPOWER"	Will.i.am featuring Justin Bieber	6	20 May	2	
20 May	"Waiting All Night"	Rudimental featuring Ella Eyre	6	3 June	4	
20 May	"Time to Say Goodbye" ◁	Luke Kennedy	8	20 May	1	
27 May	"Treasure"	Bruno Mars	10	27 May	2	
27 May	"Can't Help Falling in Love" ◁	Harrison Craig	6	27 May	1	
3 June	"Beautiful"	Mariah Carey featuring Miguel	6	10 June	3	
3 June	"Resolution"	Matt Corby	5	3 June	7	
10 June	"Young and Beautiful"	Lana Del Rey	8	18 November	3	
10 June	"Bayini" ◁	Geoffrey Gurrumul Yunupingu and Delta Goodrem	4	10 June	1	
17 June	"Parachute" ◁	Timomatic	3	1 July	6	
17 June	"We Own It"	2 Chainz and Wiz Khalifa	6	17 June	2	
17 June	"More Than a Dream" ◁	Harrison Craig	3	17 June	1	
17 June	"Unchained Melody" ◁	Harrison Craig	2	17 June	2	
24 June	"Dear Darlin'"	Olly Murs	4	1 July	5	
24 June	"Heart Hypnotic" ◁	Delta Goodrem	7	24 June	1	
24 June	"Come with Me" ◁	Ricky Martin	3	24 June	1	
1 July	"Radioactive"	Imagine Dragons	6	15 July	5	
1 July	"Wild"	Jessie J featuring Big Sean and Dizzee Rascal	6	8 July	3	
1 July	"Wake Me Up" (#4)	Avicii featuring Aloe Blacc	1	8 July	15	
8 July	"Firestarter" ◁	Samantha Jade	9	8 July	1	
8 July	"We Can't Stop"	Miley Cyrus	4	15 July	6	
8 July	"Counting Stars" (#8)	OneRepublic	2	15 July	10	
15 July	"True Love"	Pink featuring Lily Allen	5	15 July	1	
22 July	"La La La"	Naughty Boy featuring Sam Smith	5	5 August	7	
22 July	"Royals" (#5)	Lorde	2	5 August	11	
29 July	"Acapella"	Karmin	4	5 August	6	
29 July	"Burn"	Ellie Goulding	6	12 August	6	
29 July	"Best Song Ever" ◁	One Direction	4	29 July	2	
12 August	"Classic"	MKTO	9	12 August	3	
19 August	"Can't Believe It"	Flo Rida featuring Pitbull	7	2 September	4	
19 August	"Roar" (#1) ◁	Katy Perry	1	26 August	21	
19 August	"Talk Dirty" ◁	Jason Derulo featuring 2 Chainz	1	19 August	9	
26 August	"Summertime Sadness"	Lana Del Rey	3	2 September	7	
9 September	"Love Me Again"	John Newman	4	30 September	5	
9 September	"Berzerk"	Eminem	5	9 September	3	
16 September	"Something I Need"	OneRepublic	6	23 September	4	
16 September	"Wrecking Ball"	Miley Cyrus	2	23 September	8	
16 September	"Let's Get Ridiculous" ◁	Redfoo	1	16 September	7	
23 September	"Hold On, We're Going Home"	Drake featuring Majid Jordan	8	30 September	5	
7 October	"Pop a Bottle (Fill Me Up)" ◁	Jessica Mauboy	2	7 October	3	
14 October	"You" ◁	Nathaniel	4	21 October	6	
14 October	"Bonfire Heart" ◁	James Blunt	3	21 October	3	
21 October	"Marry Me"	Jason Derulo	8	28 October	2	
21 October	"Timber" ◁	Pitbull featuring Kesha	4	28 October	15	
21 October	"Hey Brother"	Avicii	2	21 October	12	
28 October	"On Top of the World"	Imagine Dragons	10	28 October	1	
28 October	"The Fox"	Ylvis	9	28 October	1	
28 October	"Girls Just Want to Have Fun" ◁	Taylor Henderson	2	28 October	1	
4 November	"Everybody"	Justice Crew	6	18 November	6	
4 November	"Like a Drum" ◁	Guy Sebastian	4	4 November	10	
4 November	"Story of My Life" ◁	One Direction	3	4 November	3	
4 November	"Alive" ◁	Dami Im	1	4 November	3	
11 November	"Your Eyes" ◁	Jai Waetford	6	11 November	1	
11 November	"The Monster"	Eminem featuring Rihanna	1	18 November	11	
11 November	"Borrow My Heart" ◁	Taylor Henderson	1	11 November	4	
18 November	"I See Fire" ◁	Ed Sheeran	10	18 November	3	
25 November	"Of the Night"	Bastille	6	25 November	3	
2 December	"Rude"	Magic!	2	16 December	12	
2 December	"All of Me"	John Legend	1	9 December	15	
16 December	"Trumpets"	Jason Derulo	1	30 December	10	

=== 2012 peaks ===
List of ARIA top ten singles in 2013 that peaked in 2012
Top ten entry date	Single	Artist(s)	Peak	Peak date	Weeks in top ten	References
17 September	"Gangnam Style" ◁	Psy	1	1 October	16	
22 October	"I Knew You Were Trouble"	Taylor Swift	3	10 December	12	
29 October	"Locked Out of Heaven"	Bruno Mars	4	5 November	10	
29 October	"Don't You Worry Child"	Swedish House Mafia featuring John Martin	1	12 November	12	
12 November	"Little Talks"	Of Monsters and Men	7	10 December	7	
19 November	"Thrift Shop"	Macklemore & Ryan Lewis featuring Wanz	1	3 December	14	
10 December	"Scream & Shout"	Will.i.am featuring Britney Spears	2	17 December	10	
10 December	"Troublemaker"	Olly Murs featuring Flo Rida	4	10 December	8	
31 December	"Beauty and a Beat"	Justin Bieber featuring Nicki Minaj	9	31 December	2	

=== 2014 peaks ===
List of ARIA top ten singles in 2013 that peaked in 2014
Top ten entry date	Single	Artist(s)	Peak	Peak date	Weeks in top ten	References
29 July	"Riptide"	Vance Joy	6	3 February	5	
16 December	"Happy" ◁	Pharrell Williams	1	6 January	20	
23 December	"Free"	Rudimental featuring Emeli Sandé	5	13 January	11	

== Entries by artist ==
The following table shows artists who achieved two or more top 10 entries in 2013, including songs that reached their peak in 2012 and 2014. The figures include both main artists and featured artists. The total number of weeks an artist spent in the top ten in 2013 is also shown.

Entries	Artist	Weeks	Songs
4	Jason Derulo	21	"Marry Me", "Talk Dirty", "The Other Side", "Trumpets"
3	Avicii	31	"Hey Brother", "I Could Be the One", "Wake Me Up"
3	Bruno Mars	11	"Locked Out of Heaven", "Treasure", "When I Was Your Man"
3	Flo Rida	8	"Can't Believe It", "Let It Roll", "Troublemaker"
3	Harrison Craig	3	"Can't Help Falling in Love", "More Than a Dream", "Unchained Melody"
3	Macklemore & Ryan Lewis	22	"Can't Hold Us", "Same Love", "Thrift Shop"
3	One Direction	7	"Best Song Ever", "One Way or Another (Teenage Kicks)", "Story of My Life"
3	Pharrell Williams	18	"Blurred Lines", "Get Lucky", "Happy"
3	Pitbull	17	"Can't Believe It", "Feel This Moment", "Timber"
2	2 Chainz	11	"Talk Dirty", "We Own It"
2	Bastille	14	"Of the Night", "Pompeii"
2	Delta Goodrem	2	"Bayini", "Heart Hypnotic"
2	Ellie Goulding	14	"Burn", "I Need Your Love"
2	Emeli Sandé	11	"Beneath Your Beautiful", "Free"
2	Eminem	11	"Berzerk", "The Monster"
2	Imagine Dragons	6	"On Top of the World", "Radioactive"
2	Justin Bieber	3	"Beauty and a Beat", "#thatPOWER"
2	Justin Timberlake	2	"Mirrors", "Suit & Tie"
2	Lana Del Rey	10	"Summertime Sadness", "Young and Beautiful"
2	Miley Cyrus	14	"We Can't Stop", "Wrecking Ball"
2	MKTO	12	"Classic", "Thank You"
2	Olly Murs	9	"Dear Darlin'", "Troublemaker"
2	OneRepublic	14	"Counting Stars", "Something I Need"
2	Pink	12	"Just Give Me a Reason", "True Love"
2	Rihanna	15	"Stay", "The Monster"
2	Rudimental	6	"Free", "Waiting All Night"
2	Taylor Henderson	5	"Borrow My Heart", "Girls Just Want to Have Fun"
2	Will.i.am	8	"Scream & Shout", "#thatPOWER"

== See also ==
- 2013 in music
- ARIA Charts
- List of number-one singles of 2013 (Australia)
- List of top 25 singles for 2013 in Australia
