= Booty Man =

Booty Man may refer to:

- Booty Man, a ring name used by American professional wrestler Brutus Beefcake
- "Booty Man", a song by Craig David from his 2000 album Born to Do It
- "Booty Man", a 2015 song by Redfoo
- "Booty Man", a 2003 song by Tim Wilson

== See also ==
- Batty man, a slur in Jamaican Patois
