= Holes (Passenger song) =

Single by Passenger

from the album All the Little Lights
- Released: 15 February 2013
- Recorded: 2012
- Genre: Indie rock; indie folk; acoustic
- Length: 3:31
- Label: Embassy of Music
- Songwriter(s): Mike Rosenberg
- Producer(s): Mike Rosenberg; Chris Vallejo

Passenger singles chronology
"Let Her Go" (2012)	"Holes" (2013)	"Scare Away the Dark" (2014)

Music video
- "Holes" on YouTube

"Holes" is a song by British singer-songwriter Passenger. It was released on 15 February 2013 as the third single from his album All the Little Lights. The song with music and lyrics by Mike Rosenberg himself and produced by him and Chris Vallejo initially charted in the Netherlands and later in a number of charts, including the top 20 of the Australian and Irish charts.

== Chart performance ==
Chart (2013)	Peak position
Australia (ARIA)	20
Austria (Ö3 Austria Top 40)	23
Belgium (Ultratip Bubbling Under Flanders)	12
Germany (GfK)	48
Ireland (IRMA)	18
Netherlands (Dutch Top 40)	34
Netherlands (Single Top 100)	56
Slovakia (Rádio Top 100)	76
Slovenia (SloTop50)	17
Switzerland (Schweizer Hitparade)	71
UK Singles (OCC)	92
