= Party Rock Mansion =

Studio album by Redfoo
- Released: March 18, 2016
- Genres: EDM; electro-hop; pop
- Length: 49:38
- Labels: Rykodisc; Party Rock
- Producers: Redfoo; Play-N-Skillz

Redfoo chronology
Balance Beam (1997)	Party Rock Mansion (2016)

Singles from Party Rock Mansion
- 1. "New Thang" Released: August 6, 2014; 2. "Juicy Wiggle" Released: February 10, 2015; 3. "Where the Sun Goes" Released: May 10, 2015; 4. "Party Train" Released: February 18, 2016

Professional ratings
Review scores
Source	Rating
AllMusic	3.5/5 stars

Party Rock Mansion is the first solo studio album by American rapper Redfoo. It was released on March 18, 2016, through the record labels Rykodisc Records and Party Rock Records. The album was executive produced by Redfoo with additional production by Brandon M. Garcia and Play-N-Skillz, and continues the naming scheme of LMFAO's records Party Rock (2009) and Sorry for Party Rocking (2011). Party Rock Mansion features guest appearances from Stevie Wonder and Dimitri Vegas & Like Mike. It was supported by the singles "New Thang", "Juicy Wiggle" "Where the Sun Goes" and "Party Train".

== Singles ==
"New Thang" was released on August 6, 2014, as the first single from the album. The song peaked at number 3 in Australia and New Zealand, also charting in Finland, Greece, Slovakia and South Korea.

The album's second single, "Juicy Wiggle" was released on February 10, 2015. Later that year, Redfoo performed a "Munk Remix" of the song with Alvin and the Chipmunks for the movie Alvin and the Chipmunks: The Road Chip and its soundtrack.

The album's third single, "Party Train" was released February 18, 2016.

== Commercial performance ==
The album was a commercial failure, with only 144 copies sold throughout Australia in its first week of release.

== Track listing ==
Party Rock Mansion – North American standard version
No.	Title	Length
1.	"Keep Shining"	5:33
2.	"Party Train"	3:22
3.	"Too Much"	3:23
4.	"Beach Cruisin'"	4:23
5.	"Booty Man"	3:42
6.	"Lights Out"	3:14
7.	"So Lit"	3:18
8.	"New Thang"	3:47
9.	"Juicy Wiggle"	3:52
10.	"Good Things Happen When Ya Drunk"	3:00
11.	"Where the Sun Goes" (featuring Stevie Wonder)	4:46
12.	"Meet Her at Tomorrow" (featuring Dimitri Vegas & Like Mike)	4:02
13.	"Maybe"	3:22

Party Rock Mansion – Japanese edition
No.	Title	Length
14.	"Booty Man" (Cheek Freaks Remix)	2:55
15.	"Lights Out" (Party Rock Remix)	4:03
16.	"New Thang" (Some Blond DJ Remix)	4:52

== Personnel ==
Musicians

- Redfoo – vocals, engineer
- Stevie Wonder – featured artist (track 11)
- Dimitri Vegas & Like Mike – featured artist (track 12)

Production

- Brandon M. Garcia – production (track 2, 6, 7, 9, 10, 12), recording engineer
- Play N Skillz – production (track 8, 11)

== Charts ==
Chart performance for Party Rock Mansion
Chart (2016)	Peak position
Australian Albums (ARIA)	172
Belgian Albums (Ultratop Flanders)	158
US Heatseekers Albums (Billboard)	25
US Top Dance Albums (Billboard)	8
