= List of number-one digital tracks of 2013 (Australia) =

ARIA Charts number-one digital tracks of 2013 < 2012 2014 >

Other Australian number-one charts of 2013
- albums
- singles
- urban singles
- dance singles
- club tracks
- streaming tracks

Top Australian singles and albums of 2013
- Triple J Hottest 100
- top 25 singles
- top 25 albums

The ARIA Digital Track Chart is a chart that ranks the best-performing digital tracks singles of Australia. It is published by Australian Recording Industry Association (ARIA), an organisation who collect music data for the weekly ARIA Charts. To be eligible to appear on the chart, the recording must be a single not an EP and only paid downloads counted from downloadable outlets.

== Chart history ==
Key
†	Indicates number-one digital single of 2013

Issue date	Song	Artist(s)	Reference
7 January	"Thrift Shop"	Macklemore & Ryan Lewis featuring Wanz	
14 January	"Scream & Shout"	will.i.am featuring Britney Spears	
21 January	"Same Love"	Macklemore & Ryan Lewis featuring Mary Lambert	
28 January	"Same Love"	Macklemore & Ryan Lewis featuring Mary Lambert	
4 February	"Same Love"	Macklemore & Ryan Lewis featuring Mary Lambert	
11 February	"Same Love"	Macklemore & Ryan Lewis featuring Mary Lambert	
18 February	"Just Give Me a Reason"	Pink featuring Nate Ruess	
25 February	"Harlem Shake"	Baauer	
4 March	"Just Give Me a Reason"	Pink featuring Nate Ruess	
11 March	"Just Give Me a Reason"	Pink featuring Nate Ruess	
18 March	"Just Give Me a Reason"	Pink featuring Nate Ruess	
25 March	"Can't Hold Us"	Macklemore & Ryan Lewis featuring Ray Dalton	
1 April	"Let Her Go"	Passenger	
8 April	"Let Her Go"	Passenger	
15 April	"Let Her Go"	Passenger	
22 April	"Let Her Go"	Passenger	
29 April	"Let Her Go"	Passenger	
6 May	"Get Lucky"	Daft Punk featuring Pharrell Williams	
13 May	"Blurred Lines"	Robin Thicke featuring Pharrell Williams & T.I.	
20 May	"Blurred Lines"	Robin Thicke featuring Pharrell Williams & T.I.	
27 May	"Blurred Lines"	Robin Thicke featuring Pharrell Williams & T.I.	
3 June	"Blurred Lines"	Robin Thicke featuring Pharrell Williams & T.I.	
10 June	"Blurred Lines"	Robin Thicke featuring Pharrell Williams & T.I.	
17 June	"Blurred Lines"	Robin Thicke featuring Pharrell Williams & T.I.	
24 June	"Blurred Lines"	Robin Thicke featuring Pharrell Williams & T.I.	
1 July	"Blurred Lines"	Robin Thicke featuring Pharrell Williams & T.I.	
8 July	"Wake Me Up"	Avicii featuring Aloe Blacc	
15 July	"Wake Me Up"	Avicii featuring Aloe Blacc	
22 July	"Wake Me Up"	Avicii featuring Aloe Blacc	
29 July	"Wake Me Up"	Avicii featuring Aloe Blacc	
5 August	"Wake Me Up"	Avicii featuring Aloe Blacc	
12 August	"Wake Me Up"	Avicii featuring Aloe Blacc	
19 August	"Talk Dirty"	Jason Derulo featuring 2 Chainz	
26 August	"Roar"†	Katy Perry	
2 September	"Roar"†	Katy Perry	
9 September	"Roar"†	Katy Perry	
16 September	"Let's Get Ridiculous"	Redfoo	
23 September	"Roar"†	Katy Perry	
30 September	"Roar"†	Katy Perry	
7 October	"Roar"†	Katy Perry	
14 October	"Roar"†	Katy Perry	
21 October	"Roar"†	Katy Perry	
28 October	"Roar"†	Katy Perry	
4 November	"Alive"	Dami Im	
11 November	"Borrow My Heart"	Taylor Henderson	
18 November	"The Monster"	Eminem featuring Rihanna	
25 November	"The Monster"	Eminem featuring Rihanna	
2 December	"The Monster"	Eminem featuring Rihanna	
9 December	"All of Me"	John Legend	
16 December	"All of Me"	John Legend	
23 December	"All of Me"	John Legend	
30 December	"Trumpets"	Jason Derulo	

== Number-one artists ==
Position	Artist	Weeks at No. 1
1	Katy Perry	9
1	Pharrell Williams (as featuring)	9
2	Robin Thicke	8
2	T.I. (as featuring)	8
3	Aloe Blacc (as featuring)	6
3	Avicii	6
3	Macklemore & Ryan Lewis	6
4	Passenger	5
5	Mary Lambert (as featuring)	4
5	Nate Ruess (as featuring)	4
5	Pink	4
6	Eminem	3
6	John Legend	3
6	Rihanna (as featuring)	3
7	Jason Derulo	2
8	2 Chainz (as featuring)	1
8	Baauer	1
8	Britney Spears (as featuring)	1
8	Daft Punk	1
8	Dami Im	1
8	Ray Dalton (as featuring)	1
8	Redfoo	1
8	Taylor Henderson	1
8	Wanz (as featuring)	1
8	will.i.am	1

== See also ==
- 2013 in music
- List of number-one singles of 2013 (Australia)
