= New Thang =

Single by Redfoo

from the album Party Rock Mansion
- Released: August 6, 2014
- Recorded: 2013
- Genre: EDM; electro hop
- Length: 3:46
- Label: Party Rock; Rykodisc
- Songwriter: Stefan Gordy
- Producer: Play-N-Skillz

Redfoo singles chronology
"Drop Girl" (2014)	"New Thang" (2014)	"Literally I Can't" (2014)

"New Thang" is a song by American rapper Redfoo, also known for being half of the duo LMFAO. It was released as the first single from his debut solo studio album Party Rock Mansion on August 6, 2014. The song, written and produced by himself, peaked at number 3 on the Australian Singles Chart. In 2020, the song went viral on TikTok, being used in many videos.

== Music video ==
The music video for this song was released on August 24, 2014, via Redfoo's YouTube account. The video was shot in Santa Clarita and features an array of women in vibrant, neon colours and Sergio Flores shirtless, playing the saxophone.

Redfoo said of the video: "It will always have a bit of humour and the sexiness. I might not be curing cancer but what I am doing is consciously doing my best to spread happiness as an entertainer. I want to make people feel good."

== Promotion ==
Redfoo performed the song live on The X Factor Australia's result show on September 1, where he is also a judge/mentor.

== Official remixes ==
- Acapella and Sax Stem (4:38)
- The Works and Redfoo Remix (4:22)
- DJ Soda Remix (4:52)

== Charts ==
=== Weekly charts ===
Weekly chart performance for "New Thang"
Chart (2014–2015)	Peak position
Australia (ARIA)	3
Finland (Suomen virallinen lista)	18
France (SNEP)	78
Greece Digital Songs (Billboard)	2
Hungary (Single Top 40)	31
New Zealand (Recorded Music NZ)	3
Slovakia Singles Digital (ČNS IFPI)	65
Sweden Heatseeker (Sverigetopplistan)	6
South Korea International Chart (Gaon)	3
US Hot Dance/Electronic Songs (Billboard)	42

=== Year-end charts ===
Year-end chart performance for "New Thang"
Chart (2014)	Position
Australia (ARIA)	48
New Zealand (Recorded Music NZ)	43

== Certifications ==
Certifications for "New Thang"
Region	Certification	Certified units/sales
New Zealand (RMNZ)	Platinum	15,000^{*}
Poland (ZPAV)	Gold	25,000^{‡}
^{*} Sales figures based on certification alone.^{‡} Sales+streaming figures based on certification alone.
