= Literally I Can't =

Single by Play-N-Skillz featuring Redfoo, Lil Jon and Enertia McFly
- Released: November 1, 2014
- Genre: EDM
- Length: 3:58
- Label: Party Rock
- Songwriter(s): Juan Salinas; Oscar Salinas; Stefan Gordy; Jonathan Smith; Emmanuel Anene
- Producer(s): Play-N-Skillz

Play-N-Skillz singles chronology
"Say Goodbye" (2012)	"Literally I Can't" (2014)	"Not a Crime" (2016)

Redfoo singles chronology
"New Thang" (2014)	"Literally I Can't" (2014)	"Juicy Wiggle" (2015)

Lil Jon singles chronology
"Bend Ova" (2014)	"Literally I Can't" (2014)	"My Cutie Pie" (2015)

"Literally I Can't" is a song by production duo Play-N-Skillz featuring Redfoo, Lil Jon, and Enertia McFly, released in 2014. The song's music video was posted to YouTube on October 30, 2014, by Redfoo's label Party Rock. The song was received negatively by critics, with the artists and the song's music video also accused of being misogynist.

== Reception ==
Complex called the song "everything wrong with EDM", with "predictable electro house for the chorus that leads into a generic, bouncy trap beat during the verses". The concept was called "so one-note" in that "the only remedy you could come up with is telling the woman [refusing to participate] to shut the fuck up and get drunk?"

In 2015, Billboard ranked the song first on their list of "The 10 Worst Songs of the 2010s (So Far)" and stated: "You'd think that a song this reactionary and lame-brained wouldn't even be produced in 2014, and thankfully, Play-N-Skillz's opus to garbage viewpoints was not a hit. Congrats to the guys for topping one list, though!".

== Music video ==
The video was directed by Mickey Finnegan, who directed most of LMFAO's music videos. It features a group of sorority sisters from LIC (Literally I Can't) attending a party at the STFU frat house. The women refuse any offer to dance or drink with "literally I can't", with the men telling them to "shut the fuck up" in response. As the video progresses, most women from the group "succumb to Redfoo's boozy proposal" and join the party until only the head of the sorority is left, who subsequently leaves.

The video was criticized by some media outlets as misogynist soon after its release. One such outlet, Nine.com.au's "The Fix", refused to cover Redfoo in protest of the video. Redfoo responded to criticism by blaming female bloggers for starting the controversy about the video, saying on Australian radio that "The women have gone crazy on me". He also defended the video as satirical and said he was only trying to make a fun party song.
