= I'll Award You with My Body =

Single by Redfoo
- Released: June 6, 2013
- Recorded: 2012
- Length: 3:29
- Label: Interscope
- Songwriter: Stefan Gordy
- Producer: Redfoo

Redfoo singles chronology
"Bring Out the Bottles" (2012)	"I'll Award You with My Body" (2013)	"Let's Get Ridiculous" (2013)

Alternative cover
- Worldwide cover

"I'll Award You with My Body" is a song by American rapper Redfoo, formerly known as half of LMFAO. The song, written and produced by Redfoo, was released on June 6, 2013. It was not promoted and was not a success on the charts, only charting in Australia at number 58. The song charted primarily due to the buzz surrounding Redfoo joining the Australian version of The X Factor in mid-2013. His subsequent single would top the chart and be certified 4× Platinum.

== Charts ==
Chart performance for "I'll Award You with My Body"
Chart (2013)	Peak position
Australia (ARIA)	58
Belgium (Ultratip Bubbling Under Wallonia)	26

== Release history ==
Release history and formats for "I'll Award You with My Body"
Region	Date	Format	Label
Various	6 June 2013	Digital download	Interscope
