= Bring Out the Bottles =

Single by Redfoo
- Released: December 28, 2012
- Recorded: 2012
- Length: 3:59
- Label: Interscope
- Songwriters: Andre Smith; Brandon Garcia; Stefan Gordy
- Producer: Redfoo

Redfoo singles chronology
"Live My Life (Party Rock Remix)" (2012)	"Bring Out the Bottles" (2012)	"I'll Award You with My Body" (2013)

"Bring Out the Bottles" is a song by American rapper Redfoo, also known for being half of the duo LMFAO. It was released on December 28, 2012. "Bring Out the Bottles" was produced by Redfoo, who also wrote the song along with Andre Smith and Brandon Garcia.

== Background ==
The song is Redfoo's first solo single since 1998. It is similar in style to LMFAO's previous single "Champagne Showers".

== Charts ==
Chart performance for "Bring Out the Bottles"
Chart (2013)	Peak position
Belgium (Ultratip Bubbling Under Flanders)	62
Belgium (Ultratip Bubbling Under Wallonia)	52
Netherlands (Single Top 100)	86
South Korea International Singles (Gaon)	3

== Release history ==
Release history and formats for "Bring Out the Bottles"
Region	Date	Format	Label	Ref.
United States	January 22, 2013	Digital download	Interscope	
