= Nick Voss =

Australian musician

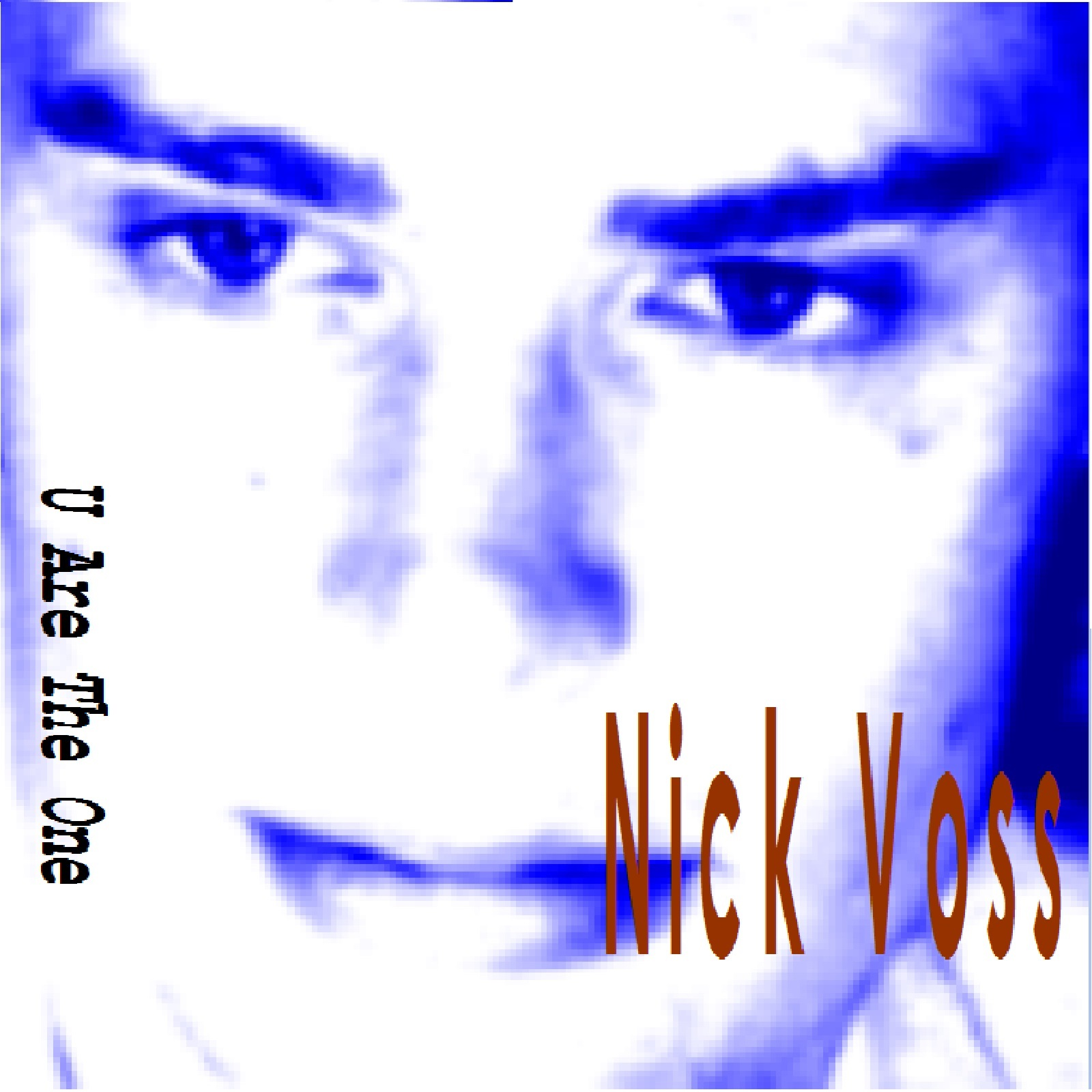
Nick Voss

Nick Voss is an Australian music artist. His songs "U Are The One" and "Ministry" from his album Rise made the top ten of the ARIA Streaming Charts 2013, with "U Are The One" going to number 1 for three weeks.

Voss was the first Australian Artist to go #1 on the ARIA Streaming Charts and the first Australia/international artist to have two songs in the Top ten of the ARIA Streaming Charts.

== "U Are the One" ==
"U Are The One" is a single by Nick Voss. It was released 2012 on his album Rise. It went to number one on the ARIA Streaming Chart on 11 March 2013 and stayed at that ranking for three weeks.
