= List of number-one singles of 2013 (Australia) =

ARIA Charts number-one singles of 2013 < 2012 2014 >

Other Australian number-one charts of 2013
- albums
- urban singles
- dance singles
- club tracks
- digital tracks
- streaming tracks

Top Australian singles and albums of 2013
- Triple J Hottest 100
- top 25 singles
- top 25 albums

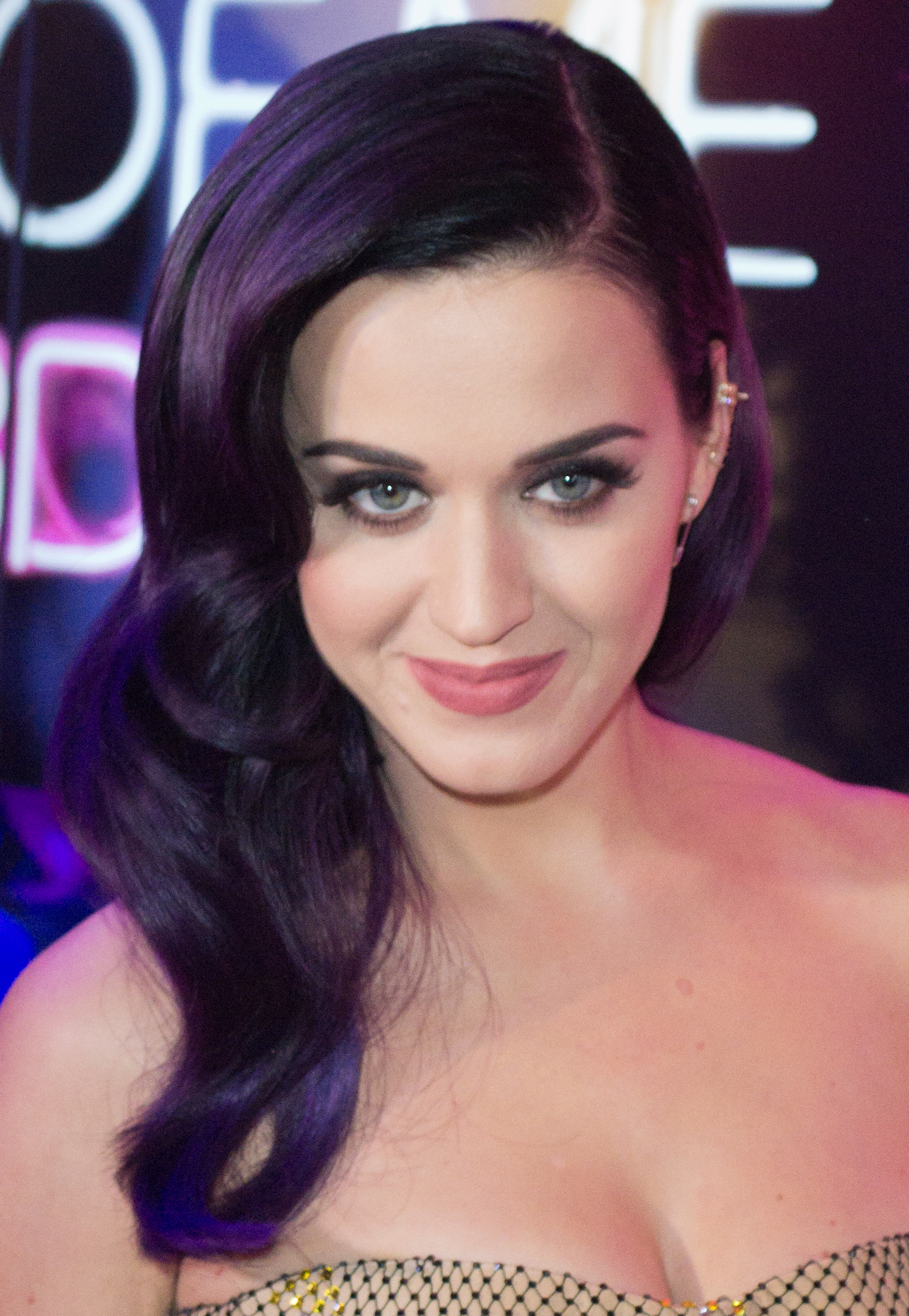
Katy Perry's "Roar" was the longest-running number-one single of 2013, having topped the ARIA Singles Chart for nine weeks.

The ARIA Singles Chart ranks the best-performing singles in Australia. Its data, published by the Australian Recording Industry Association, is based collectively on each single's weekly physical and digital sales. In 2013, seventeen singles claimed the top spot, including "Thrift Shop" by Macklemore & Ryan Lewis, which started its peak position in late 2012. Fifteen acts achieved their first number-one single in Australia, either as a lead or featured artist: Mary Lambert, Nate Ruess, Baauer, Ray Dalton, Passenger, Daft Punk, Pharrell Williams, Robin Thicke, T.I., Avicii, 2 Chainz, Redfoo, Dami Im, Taylor Henderson and John Legend. Im and Henderson were the only Australian artists to achieve a number-one single.

Macklemore and Ryan Lewis had three number-one singles during the year for "Thrift Shop", "Same Love" and "Can't Hold Us". Jason Derulo earned two number-one singles for "Talk Dirty" and "Trumpets". Pharrell Williams also earned two number-one singles during the year, as a featured artist on Daft Punk's "Get Lucky" and Robin Thicke's "Blurred Lines". Katy Perry's "Roar" was the longest-running number-one single of 2013, having topped the ARIA Singles Chart for nine weeks. "Blurred Lines" was the second longest-running number-one single, with eight consecutive weeks at the top. Passenger's "Let Her Go" stayed at number one for five consecutive weeks, while Avicii's "Wake Me Up!" topped the chart for six consecutive weeks.

== Chart history ==
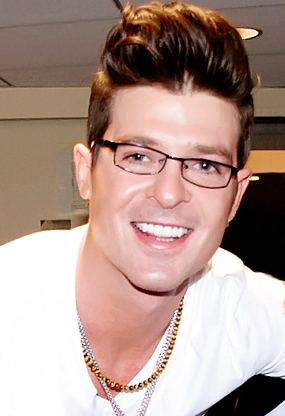
Robin Thicke earned his first Australian number-one with "Blurred Lines", which topped the ARIA Singles Chart for eight consecutive weeks.

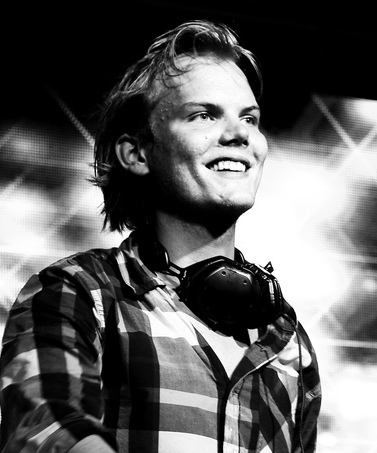
Avicii earned his first Australian number-one with "Wake Me Up!", which topped the ARIA Singles Chart for six consecutive weeks.

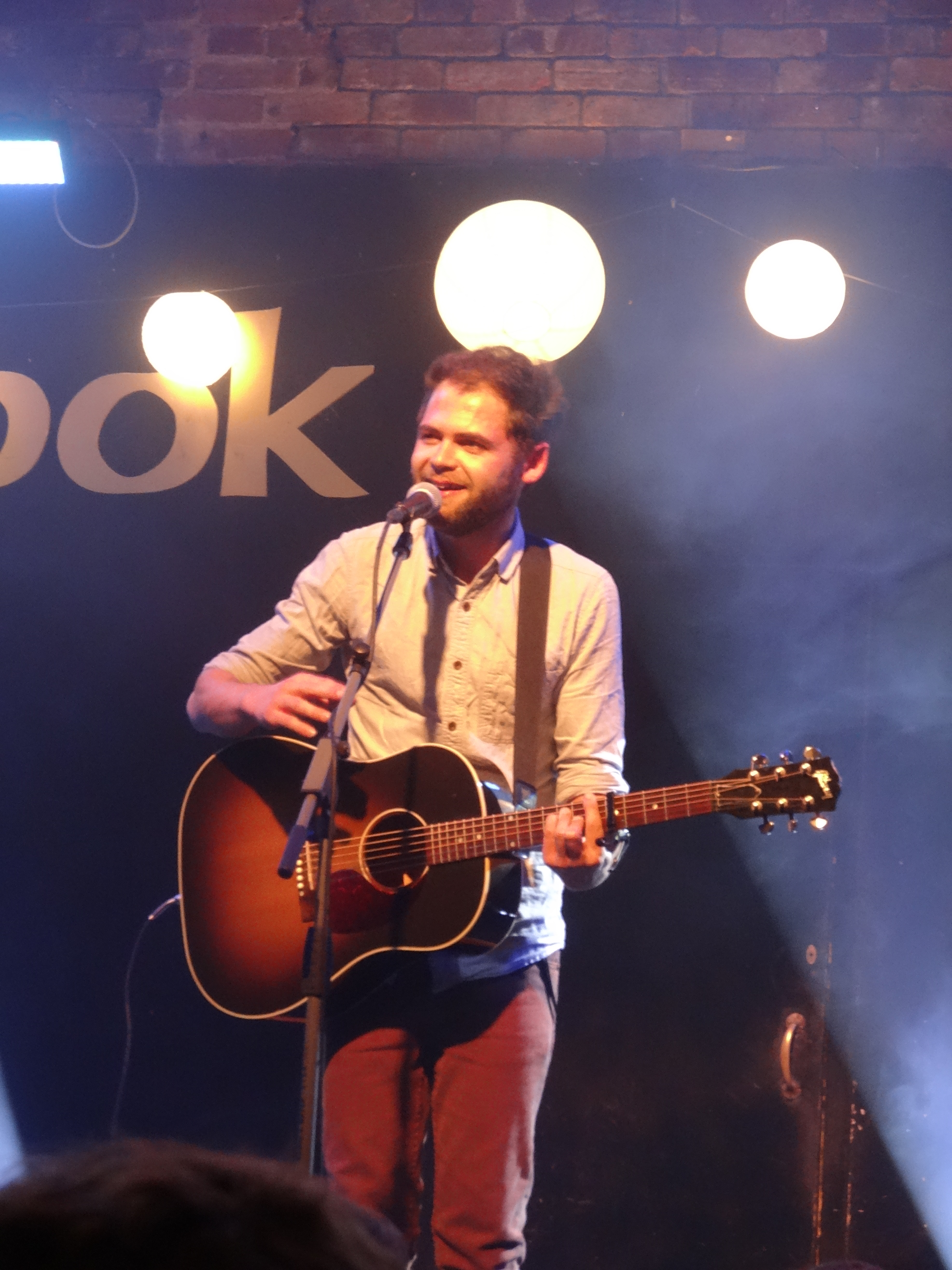
Passenger earned his first Australian number-one with "Let Her Go", which topped the ARIA Singles Chart for five consecutive weeks.

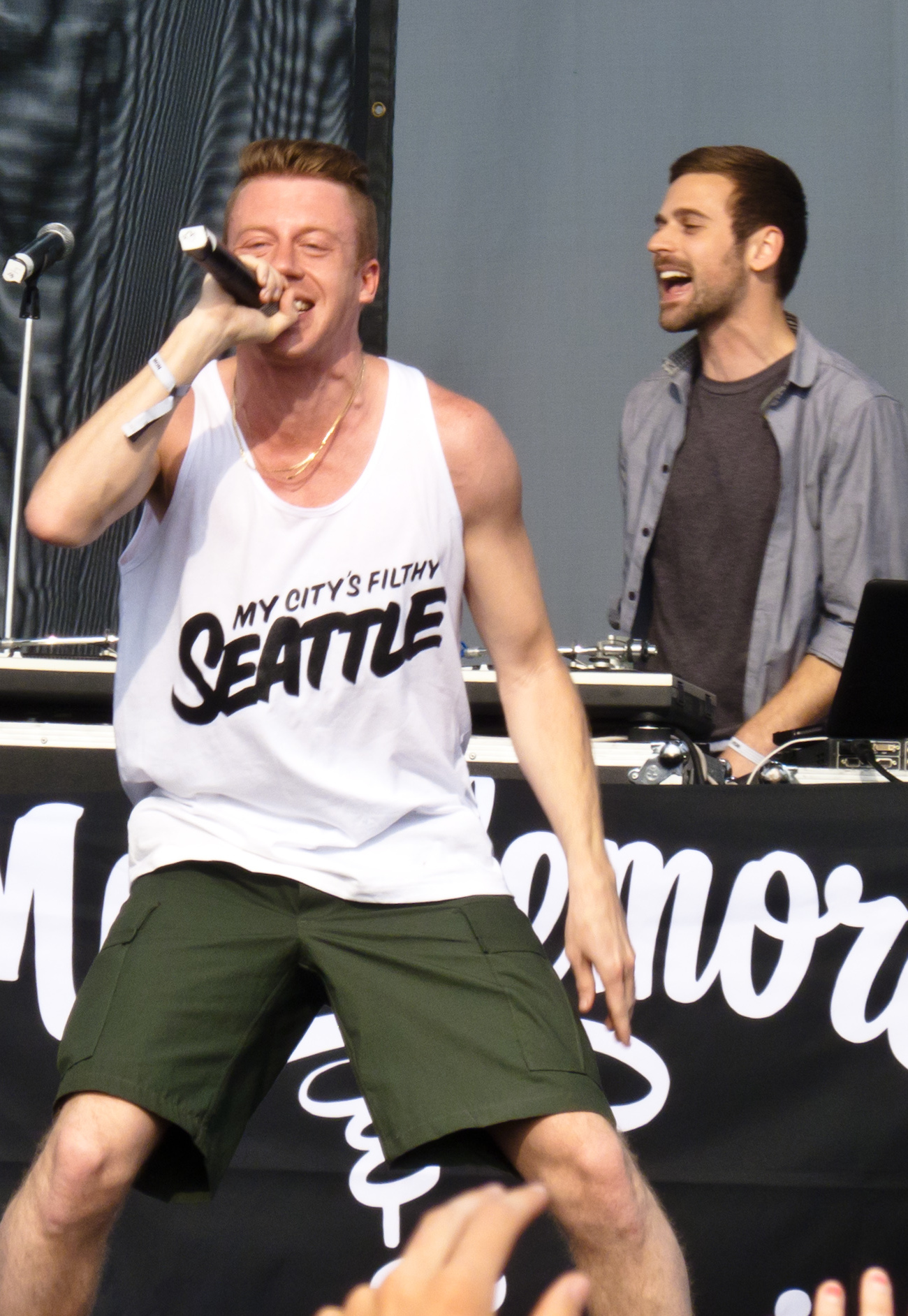
Macklemore & Ryan Lewis had three number-one singles during the year for "Thrift Shop", "Same Love" and "Can't Hold Us".

Key
The yellow background indicates the #1 song on ARIA's End of Year Singles Chart of 2013.

| Date | Song | Artist(s) | Ref. |
|---|---|---|---|
| 7 January | "Thrift Shop" | Macklemore & Ryan Lewis featuring Wanz | |
| 14 January | "Thrift Shop" | Macklemore & Ryan Lewis featuring Wanz | |
| 21 January | "Same Love" | Macklemore and Ryan Lewis featuring Mary Lambert | |
| 28 January | "Same Love" | Macklemore and Ryan Lewis featuring Mary Lambert | |
| 4 February | "Same Love" | Macklemore and Ryan Lewis featuring Mary Lambert | |
| 11 February | "Same Love" | Macklemore and Ryan Lewis featuring Mary Lambert | |
| 18 February | "Just Give Me a Reason" | Pink featuring Nate Ruess | |
| 25 February | "Harlem Shake" | Baauer | |
| 4 March | "Just Give Me a Reason" | Pink featuring Nate Ruess | |
| 11 March | "Just Give Me a Reason" | Pink featuring Nate Ruess | |
| 18 March | "Just Give Me a Reason" | Pink featuring Nate Ruess | |
| 25 March | "Can't Hold Us" | Macklemore and Ryan Lewis featuring Ray Dalton | |
| 1 April | "Let Her Go" | Passenger | |
| 8 April | "Let Her Go" | Passenger | |
| 15 April | "Let Her Go" | Passenger | |
| 22 April | "Let Her Go" | Passenger | |
| 29 April | "Let Her Go" | Passenger | |
| 6 May | "Get Lucky" | Daft Punk featuring Pharrell Williams | |
| 13 May | "Blurred Lines" | Robin Thicke featuring T.I. and Pharrell Williams | |
| 20 May | "Blurred Lines" | Robin Thicke featuring T.I. and Pharrell Williams | |
| 27 May | "Blurred Lines" | Robin Thicke featuring T.I. and Pharrell Williams | |
| 3 June | "Blurred Lines" | Robin Thicke featuring T.I. and Pharrell Williams | |
| 10 June | "Blurred Lines" | Robin Thicke featuring T.I. and Pharrell Williams | |
| 17 June | "Blurred Lines" | Robin Thicke featuring T.I. and Pharrell Williams | |
| 24 June | "Blurred Lines" | Robin Thicke featuring T.I. and Pharrell Williams | |
| 1 July | "Blurred Lines" | Robin Thicke featuring T.I. and Pharrell Williams | |
| 8 July | "Wake Me Up!" | Avicii | |
| 15 July | "Wake Me Up!" | Avicii | |
| 22 July | "Wake Me Up!" | Avicii | |
| 29 July | "Wake Me Up!" | Avicii | |
| 5 August | "Wake Me Up!" | Avicii | |
| 12 August | "Wake Me Up!" | Avicii | |
| 19 August | "Talk Dirty" | Jason Derulo featuring 2 Chainz | |
| 26 August | "Roar" | Katy Perry | |
| 2 September | "Roar" | Katy Perry | |
| 9 September | "Roar" | Katy Perry | |
| 16 September | "Let's Get Ridiculous" | Redfoo | |
| 23 September | "Roar" | Katy Perry | |
| 30 September | "Roar" | Katy Perry | |
| 7 October | "Roar" | Katy Perry | |
| 14 October | "Roar" | Katy Perry | |
| 21 October | "Roar" | Katy Perry | |
| 28 October | "Roar" | Katy Perry | |
| 4 November | "Alive" | Dami Im | |
| 11 November | "Borrow My Heart" | Taylor Henderson | |
| 18 November | "The Monster" | Eminem featuring Rihanna | |
| 25 November | "The Monster" | Eminem featuring Rihanna | |
| 2 December | "The Monster" | Eminem featuring Rihanna | |
| 9 December | "All of Me" | John Legend | |
| 16 December | "All of Me" | John Legend | |
| 23 December | "All of Me" | John Legend | |
| 30 December | "Trumpets" | Jason Derulo | |

== Number-one artists ==
| Position | Artist | Weeks at No. 1 |
|---|---|---|
| 1 | Katy Perry | 9 |
| 1 | Pharrell Williams (as featuring) | 9 |
| 2 | Robin Thicke | 8 |
| 2 | T.I. (as featuring) | 8 |
| 3 | Macklemore & Ryan Lewis | 7 |
| 4 | Avicii | 6 |
| 5 | Passenger | 5 |
| 6 | Mary Lambert (as featuring) | 4 |
| 6 | Pink | 4 |
| 6 | Nate Ruess (as featuring) | 4 |
| 7 | Eminem | 3 |
| 7 | Rihanna (as featuring) | 3 |
| 7 | John Legend | 3 |
| 8 | Wanz (as featuring) | 2 |
| 8 | Jason Derulo | 2 |
| 9 | Baauer | 1 |
| 9 | Ray Dalton (as featuring) | 1 |
| 9 | Daft Punk | 1 |
| 9 | 2 Chainz (as featuring) | 1 |
| 9 | Redfoo | 1 |
| 9 | Dami Im | 1 |
| 9 | Taylor Henderson | 1 |

== See also ==
- 2013 in music
- List of number-one albums of 2013 (Australia)
- List of top 25 singles for 2013 in Australia
- List of top 10 singles in 2013 (Australia)
