= List of number-one streaming tracks of 2013 (Australia) =

ARIA Charts number-one streaming tracks of 2013 2014 >

Other Australian number-one charts of 2013
- albums
- singles
- urban singles
- dance singles
- club tracks
- digital tracks

Top Australian singles and albums of 2013
- Triple J Hottest 100
- top 25 singles
- top 25 albums

The ARIA Streaming Chart is a chart that ranks the best-performing Streaming tracks singles of Australia. It is published by Australian Recording Industry Association (ARIA), an organisation who collect music data for the weekly ARIA Charts.

== Chart history ==
Key
†	Indicates number-one Streaming single of 2013

Issue date	Song	Artist(s)	Reference
31 December 2012	"Thrift Shop"	Macklemore & Ryan Lewis featuring Wanz	
7 January	"Thrift Shop"	Macklemore & Ryan Lewis featuring Wanz	
14 January	"Thrift Shop"	Macklemore & Ryan Lewis featuring Wanz	
21 January	"Thrift Shop"	Macklemore & Ryan Lewis featuring Wanz	
28 January	"Thrift Shop"	Macklemore & Ryan Lewis featuring Wanz	
4 February	"Thrift Shop"	Macklemore & Ryan Lewis featuring Wanz	
11 February	"Same Love"	Macklemore & Ryan Lewis featuring Mary Lambert	
18 February	"Same Love"	Macklemore & Ryan Lewis featuring Mary Lambert	
25 February	"Same Love"	Macklemore & Ryan Lewis featuring Mary Lambert	
4 March	"Same Love"	Macklemore & Ryan Lewis featuring Mary Lambert	
11 March	"U Are the One"	Nick Voss	
18 March	"U Are the One"	Nick Voss	
25 March	"U Are the One"	Nick Voss	
1 April	"Can't Hold Us"	Macklemore & Ryan Lewis featuring Ray Dalton	
8 April	"Let Her Go"	Passenger	
15 April	"Let Her Go"	Passenger	
22 April	"Let Her Go"	Passenger	
29 April	"Let Her Go"	Passenger	
6 May	"Get Lucky"	Daft Punk featuring Pharrell Williams	
13 May	"Get Lucky"	Daft Punk featuring Pharrell Williams	
20 May	"Get Lucky"	Daft Punk featuring Pharrell Williams	
27 May	"Get Lucky"	Daft Punk featuring Pharrell Williams	
3 June	"Get Lucky"	Daft Punk featuring Pharrell Williams	
10 June	"Blurred Lines"	Robin Thicke featuring Pharrell Williams & T.I.	
17 June	"Blurred Lines"	Robin Thicke featuring Pharrell Williams & T.I.	
24 June	"Blurred Lines"	Robin Thicke featuring Pharrell Williams & T.I.	
1 July	"Blurred Lines"	Robin Thicke featuring Pharrell Williams & T.I.	
8 July	"Wake Me Up"	Avicii featuring Aloe Blacc	
15 July	"Wake Me Up"	Avicii featuring Aloe Blacc	
22 July	"Wake Me Up"	Avicii featuring Aloe Blacc	
29 July	"Wake Me Up"	Avicii featuring Aloe Blacc	
5 August	"Wake Me Up"	Avicii featuring Aloe Blacc	
12 August	"Wake Me Up"	Avicii featuring Aloe Blacc	
19 August	"Wake Me Up"	Avicii featuring Aloe Blacc	
26 August	"Wake Me Up"	Avicii featuring Aloe Blacc	
2 September	"Wake Me Up"	Avicii featuring Aloe Blacc	
9 September	"Wake Me Up"	Avicii featuring Aloe Blacc	
16 September	"Roar"	Katy Perry	
23 September	"Roar"	Katy Perry	
30 September	"Roar"	Katy Perry	
7 October	"Royals"†	Lorde	
14 October	"Royals"†	Lorde	
21 October	"Royals"†	Lorde	
28 October	"Royals"†	Lorde	
4 November	"Royals"†	Lorde	
11 November	"Roar"	Katy Perry	
18 November	"The Monster"	Eminem featuring Rihanna	
25 November	"The Monster"	Eminem featuring Rihanna	
2 December	"The Monster"	Eminem featuring Rihanna	
9 December	"The Monster"	Eminem featuring Rihanna	
16 December	"The Monster"	Eminem featuring Rihanna	
23 December	"The Monster"	Eminem featuring Rihanna	
30 December	"The Monster"	Eminem featuring Rihanna	

== Number-one artists ==
Position	Artist	Weeks at No. 1
1	Macklemore & Ryan Lewis	11
2	Avicii	10
2	Aloe Blacc (as featuring)	10
3	Pharrell Williams (as featuring)	9
4	Eminem	7
4	Rihanna (as featuring)	7
5	Wanz (as featuring)	6
6	Daft Punk	5
6	Lorde	5
7	Katy Perry	4
7	Mary Lambert (as featuring)	4
7	Passenger	4
7	Robin Thicke	4
7	T.I. (as featuring)	4
8	Nick Voss	3
9	Ray Dalton (as featuring)	1

== See also ==
- 2013 in music
- List of number-one singles of 2013 (Australia)
