= Juicy Wiggle =

Single by Redfoo

from the album Party Rock Mansion
- Released: February 10, 2015
- Length: 3:51
- Label: Party Rock
- Songwriter(s): Stefan Gordy
- Producer(s): Redfoo

Redfoo singles chronology
"Literally I Can't" (2014)	"Juicy Wiggle" (2015)	"Where the Sun Goes" (2015)

"Juicy Wiggle" is a song by American rapper Redfoo, also known for being one half of the duo LMFAO. It was released as the second single from his debut studio album Party Rock Mansion on February 10, 2015. The song was written and produced by Redfoo.

== Music video ==
The music video for this song was released on March 16, 2015, via Redfoo's YouTube account.

== Munk Remix ==
Redfoo recorded a "Munk Remix" of the song featuring Alvin and the Chipmunks for the 2015 film Alvin and the Chipmunks: The Road Chip and its soundtrack.

== Iowa State Athletics ==
Juicy Wiggle has become a tradition at Iowa State football and basketball events. The song will typically be played after a big moment in the game has occurred. The song usually corresponds with a synchronized dance performed by the crowd. The optimal time to hear this song is during the third quarter when Iowa State extends or takes the lead.

== Charts ==
Chart performance for "Juicy Wiggle"
Chart (2015)	Peak position
Australia (ARIA)	35
US Dance Club Songs (Billboard)	29
US Hot Dance/Electronic Songs (Billboard)	27
