= Play-N-Skillz =

American record production duo from Dallas, Texas

- Origin: Irving, Texas, United States
- Genres: Hip hop; Latin; trap; EDM
- Years active: 2003–present
- Labels: Sony Latin; Latium; P.T.P.
- Members: Juan "Play" Salinas; Oscar "Skillz" Salinas
- Website: web.archive.org/web/20161008133113/http://playnskillzmusic.com/

Play-N-Skillz are a Latin/American record production/DJ group duo from Dallas, Texas, consisting of brothers Juan Salinas ("Play") and Oscar Salinas ("Skillz"). Their production has won several Grammys including the Grammy Award for Best Rap Performance by a Duo or Group in 2007 for their production on the single "Ridin'" by Chamillionaire and Krayzie Bone, and the Grammy Award for Best Rap Album for Lil Wayne's Tha Carter III (2008), which included their production on the single "Got Money".

By 2011, the duo had branched into EDM, and collaborated with David Guetta on the song "Where Them Girls At" featuring Nicki Minaj and Flo Rida. In 2014 Play-N-Skillz connected with Redfoo of the group LMFAO and went on tour with him around the world while working on Redfoo's solo album, where they wrote and produced the multi-platinum global hit "New Thang" as well as the controversial "Literally I Can't".

The duo also releases music through their record deal with Sony Latin Music, where they have had a partnership since 2016. In 2019, Play-N-Skillz produced and co-wrote the diamond single "Con Calma" for Daddy Yankee. A remix version featuring American singer Katy Perry was released on April 19, 2019. The brothers have also expanded their brand into other business ventures including being named the creative directors at CTM Latin Music Publishing, while also gaining a position of ownership in the company.

== Background ==
Music producers, singer-songwriters and DJs Juan "Play" Salinas and younger brother Oscar "Skillz" Salinas form the duo Play-N-Skillz. The Salinas brothers are of Argentine and Venezuelan descent and were raised in Texas. While attending Irving High School, in Dallas County, the two began to pursue their childhood passion of DJing, starting with school parties. After becoming well known in the Dallas area as DJs, the brothers built a temporary studio in their mother's apartment and began to explore music production.

In early 2003, a chance meeting with Houston-based rapper Lil' Flip opened the doors for Play-N-Skillz, who went-on to produce the majority of Lil' Flip's highly anticipated album, U Gotta Feel Me (2004). The success of this collaboration led to the duo’s own debut with The Process (2005), which included the single "Freaks", featuring Adina Howard and Krayzie Bone (of Cleveland-based group Bone Thugs-n-Harmony). The album’s third single, "Call Me", featured fellow Texan artist Chamillionaire, with whom Play-N Skillz would soon collaborate again, producing his popular 2005 single "Ridin'". This was the first of two Grammy Award-winning productions for the Salinas brothers, winning Best Rap Collaboration (by a group or duo) at the 49th Annual Grammy Awards.

=== 2008–2017 ===
In 2008, Play-N-Skillz worked with New Orleans rapper Lil Wayne to create the song "Got Money" for his album Tha Carter III (2008). The song soared to the top of both the hip-hop and mainstream pop charts, and was nominated for three Grammy Awards.

Three years later, the duo brought their music to the EDM (electronic dance music) scene, crossing paths with David Guetta, with whom they saw a mutual opportunity. Together, they co-wrote and arranged his music, leading to the 2011 hit "Where Them Girls At" featuring Nicki Minaj and Flo Rida.

In 2016, the DJs signed with Latium Records/Sony Music Latin and eventually released the single "No Es Ilegal (Not a Crime)", a collaboration with Puerto Rican artist and reggaetonero Daddy Yankee, which spent 20 weeks on the charts and earned them their first Latin Billboard nomination for best duo or group in 2017. On the heels of this success, the duo released their follow-up single in 2017, a modern remake of the Selena Quintanilla classic "Si Una Vez", creating a Spanish-language version featuring vocalists Frankie J, Wisin and Leslie Grace, and Spanglish and English versions with Becky G and Kap G. The single instantly became a viral sensation, topping the Shazzam and iTunes charts, as well as spending 23 weeks on the Billboard charts, earning the brothers their second consecutive Billboard Latin Music Award nomination.

=== Current era ===
At the beginning of 2018, the Salinas brothers teamed-up with DJ Steve Aoki, Elvis Crespo, and again with Daddy Yankee for the release of their global hit, "Azukita". In March of that year, the group of artists all performed on one of the biggest stages in the world, Ultra Music Festival in Miami, Florida.

Also in March 2018, Play-N-Skillz was featured by Dominican Latin trap artist Messiah on his debut single "Pum Pum", released through Atlantic Records, which the brothers produced, as well. They also worked with South Korean boy band Super Junior on the song "Lo Siento".

Play-N-Skillz released their third official single under Sony Latin, "Cuidao", featuring Yandel & Messiah. The song received over 10 million views on VEVO in less than three weeks.

In 2019, Play-N-Skillz produced and co-wrote the #1 worldwide diamond-certified single "Con Calma" with Daddy Yankee. A remixed version, featuring American singer Katy Perry, was released on April 19, 2019. The song was used in the Spies in Disguise (2019). Commercially, and as a Spanish-language song, the song topped the charts in 20 countries and territories, and reached the Top 10 of ten others. In the United States, it topped the Hot Latin Songs chart for 14 weeks. Across Europe, the single peaked at #1 in the Czech Republic, Italy, the Netherlands, Slovenia and Spain, and reached the Top 5 in Belgium, Poland and Switzerland. The song also became the longest-reigning #1 on the Argentina Hot 100, at ten weeks.

In 2020, Play-N-SKillz produced and co-wrote "Muévelo" by Nicky Jam with Daddy Yankee. It was released as the second single from the Bad Boys for Life soundtrack. It reached #1 on the US Latin Airplay chart. The duo also produced and co-wrote "Rompe Rodilla" for Puerto Rican singer Guaynaa. That same year also saw their international collaboration "Mambo" come to life, as Play-N-Skillz masterminded, co-wrote and co-produced a transnational anthem with Steve Aoki and French DJ Willy William, featuring El Alfa (Dominican Republic), Sean Paul (Jamaica) and Sfera Ebbasta (Italy).

In 2021, the duo released "Baila Así", or "dance like that", a collaboration with famed Mexican singer Thalía and Mexican-American singers Becky G and Chiquis (Rivera). The song reached the Top 10 of the Hot Latin Songs chart and was nominated for Urban Dance/Pop Song of the Year at the Lo Nuestro Awards in 2022.

== Discography ==
=== Albums ===
- Texas 2 da World (2003)
- The Best of Lil' Flip & Play N Skillz (2004)
- The Album Before The Album (2005)
- The Process (2005)

=== Mixtapes ===
- The Titaniq Prequel hosted by DJ Smallz (2007)
- Recession Proof (2009)
- Platino Lifestyle (2011)
- Fireworks (2011)
- Red October (2011)
- Fireworks 2.0 (2012)

=== Singles ===
- "Freaks" (2004) featuring Adina Howard, Krayzie Bone
- "Call Me" (2004) featuring Chamillionaire
- "Latinos Stand Up" (2005) featuring Big Gemini & Rob G
- "Get Freaky" (2006) featuring Pitbull
- "One Mo Gin" (2008) featuring Lil Jon, Krayzie Bone, & Bun B
- "Boom" (2008) featuring Nina Sky & Pitbull
- "Who Da Shit" (2008) featuring Manny Fresh & Slim Thug
- "Checkin My Fresh" (2008)
- "Xxpensive" (2009)
- "Come Home With Me" (2009) featuring Akon
- "Angel Eyes" (2009) featuring Akon
- "1, 2, 3, 4" (2010) featuring Pitbull & Paul Wall
- "I Just Wanna F*ck" (2010) featuring Three 6 Mafia & Nelly
- "Things We Do" (2010) featuring Snoop Dogg
- "Wonderful Life" (2011) featuring Bun B
- "Dallas Freaks" (2011) featuring Dorrough & Too Short
- "Richest Man" (2012) featuring Pitbull & Shelby Shaw
- "Say Goodbye" (2012) featuring Akon
- "Party People" (2014) featuring Bun B and Shelby Shaw
- "Literally I Can't" (2014) featuring Redfoo, Lil Jon and Enertia McFly
- "Not a Crime" (2016) featuring Daddy Yankee
- "Si una vez" (2016) featuring Wisin, Frankie J, & Leslie Grace
- "Si Una Vez (If I Once)" (English version) (2017) featuring Frankie J, Becky G, & Kap G
- "Hey Guapo" (2017) with Kirstin Maldonado
- "Cuidao" (2018), Yandel, Messiah
- "Azukita" (2018), Steve Aoki, Daddy Yankee, Elvis Crespo
- "Pum Pum" (2018), Messiah, Kap G
- "Bésame" (2020), Daddy Yankee, Zion & Lennox
- "Billetes" (2020), featuring Nicky Jam, Natanael Cano
- "Scarface" (2020) El Alfa, Farruko
- "Tranki" (2021), featuring De La Ghetto, Nengo Flow
- "Mambo" (2021), Steve Aoki, El Alfa, Sean Paul, Sfera Eddasta
- "Nueva Vida" (2021), Farina, Lil Durk
- "Chikitita" (2021), Guaynaa, El Alfa
- "Baila Así" (2021), featuring Chiquis, Becky G, Thalia

=== Guest appearances ===
- "Ridin Slow" (Bun B featuring Slim Thug and Play-N-Skillz) (2010)
- "Deja Vu" (Slim featuring Rick Ross and Play-N-Skillz) (2012)
- "Lo Siento" (Super Junior featuring Leslie Grace and Play-N-Skillz) (2018)
- "Azukita" (Steve Aoki featuring Daddy Yankee with Elvis Crespo and Play-N-Skillz) (2018)
- "Give Me More" (VAV featuring De La Ghetto and Play-N-Skillz) (2019)
- "Mambo" (Steve Aoki and Willy William featuring El Alfa, Sean Paul, Sfera Ebbasta and Play-N-Skillz) (2021)
- "Party Of A Lifetime" (Pitbull featuring Play-N-Skillz) (2022)
- "Beachy Remix", (Daddy Yankee, Omar Courtz, Play-N-Skillz) (2023).

== Production discography ==
- Chamillionaire – "Ridin'" (featuring Krayzie Bone) (2006)
- Reyez – "So Sexy" (2006)
- Frankie J – "That Girl" (2006)
- Hilary Duff – "With Love (Remix)" (featuring Slim Thug) (2007)
- Chamillionaire – "The Bill Collecta" (featuring Krayzie Bone) (2007)
- Kia Shine – "Krispy" (2007)
- Lil Wayne – "Got Money" (featuring T-Pain) (2008)
- Ludacris – "Wish You Would (Play-N-Skillz Remix)" (featuring T.I.) (2008)
- St. Lunatics – "Get Low 2 Da Flo" (2009)
- Nelly – "Angel Eyes" (featuring Akon) (2009)
- Hurricane Chris – "Halle Berry (She's Fine)" (2009)
- Bun B – "Ridin' Slow" (featuring Play-N-Skillz and Slim Thug) (2010)
- Slim Thug – "Free" (2010)
- Pitbull – "Daddy's Little Girl" (featuring Slim) (2009)
- David Guetta – "Where Them Girls At" (featuring Flo Rida & Nicki Minaj) (written only) (2011)
- Rye Rye – "Crazy Bitch" (featuring Akon) (2011)
- Frankie J – "Ay, Ay, Ay" (2012)
- Play-N-Skillz, Kirstin – "Hey Guapo" (2017)
- Play-N-Skillz – "La Movida" (featuring Messiah & Snow Tha Product) (2017)
- Steve Aoki, Daddy Yankee, Elvis Crespo, Play-N-Skillz – "Azukita" (2018)
- Messiah featuring Play-N-Skillz & Kap G – "PUM PUM" (2018)
- Play-N-Skillz, Yandel, Messiah – "Cuidao" (2018)
- Super Junior – "Lo Siento" (featuring Leslie Grace) (2018)
- CNCO & Prince Royce "Llegaste Tu" (2018)
- Daddy Yankee featuring Snow "Con Calma" (2019)
- Messiah feat. Nicky Jam "Solito" (2019)
- Nicky Jam & Daddy Yankee "Muevelo" (2020)
- Guaynaa "Rompe Rodillas" (2020)
- Play-N-Skillz, Daddy Yankee, Zion y Lennox "Besame" (2020)
- Natanael Cano "La Reina" (2020)
- Natanael Cano "Bendiciones" (2020)
- Play-N-Skillz, Natanael Cano, Nicky Jam "Billetes" (2020)
- Ovi, Zion y Lennox "Se Acabo" (2021)
- Ovi, Natanael Cano, J Quieles "Tumbado en Miami" (2021)
- Pitbull – "Cafe Con Leche" (2022)
- Pitbull – "La Fiesta" (2023)
