= List of top 25 singles for 2013 in Australia =

Top 25 singles of 2013 < 2012 2014 >

Other Australian top charts for 2013
- top 25 albums
- Triple J Hottest 100

Australian number-one charts of 2013
- albums
- singles
- urban singles
- dance singles
- club tracks
- digital tracks
- streaming tracks

The following lists the top 25 singles of 2013 in Australia from the Australian Recording Industry Association (ARIA) end-of-year singles chart.

Katy Perry had the highest selling single in Australia in 2013 with "Roar".

#	Title	Artist	Highest pos. reached
1	"Roar"	Katy Perry	1
2	"Blurred Lines"	Robin Thicke featuring T.I. and Pharrell Williams	1
3	"Let Her Go"	Passenger	1
4	"Wake Me Up"	Avicii	1
5	"Royals"	Lorde	2
6	"Just Give Me a Reason"	Pink featuring Nate Ruess	1
7	"Get Lucky"	Daft Punk featuring Pharrell Williams	1
8	"Counting Stars"	OneRepublic	2
9	"Can't Hold Us"	Macklemore & Ryan Lewis featuring Ray Dalton	1
10	"Impossible"	James Arthur	2
11	"Stay"	Rihanna featuring Mikky Ekko	4
12	"Riptide"	Vance Joy	6
13	"Talk Dirty"	Jason Derulo featuring 2 Chainz	1
14	"Same Love"	Macklemore & Ryan Lewis featuring Mary Lambert	1
15	"Pompeii"	Bastille	4
16	"Thrift Shop"	Macklemore & Ryan Lewis featuring Wanz	1
17	"When I Was Your Man"	Bruno Mars	6
18	"Beneath Your Beautiful"	Labrinth featuring Emeli Sandé	5
19	"Thank You"	MKTO	2
20	"Radioactive"	Imagine Dragons	6
21	"Ho Hey"	The Lumineers	3
22	"Wrecking Ball"	Miley Cyrus	2
23	"Let's Get Ridiculous"	Redfoo	1
24	"The Monster"	Eminem featuring Rihanna	1
25	"Lanterns"	Birds of Tokyo	3

== See also ==
- List of number-one singles of 2013 (Australia)
- List of Top 25 albums for 2013 in Australia
