= List of number-one dance singles of 2013 (Australia) =

ARIA Charts number-one dance singles of 2013 < 2012 2014 >

Other Australian number-one charts of 2013
- albums
- singles
- urban singles
- club tracks
- digital tracks
- streaming tracks

Top Australian singles and albums of 2013
- Triple J Hottest 100
- top 25 singles
- top 25 albums

The ARIA Dance Chart is a chart that ranks the best-performing dance singles of Australia. It is published by Australian Recording Industry Association (ARIA), an organisation who collect music data for the weekly ARIA Charts. To be eligible to appear on the chart, the recording must be a single, and be "predominantly of a dance nature, or with a featured track of a dance nature, or included in the ARIA Club Chart or a comparable overseas chart".

== Chart history ==
Issue date	Song	Artist(s)	Reference
7 January	"Scream & Shout"	will.i.am featuring Britney Spears	
14 January	"Scream & Shout"	will.i.am featuring Britney Spears	
21 January	"Scream & Shout"	will.i.am featuring Britney Spears	
28 January	"Scream & Shout"	will.i.am featuring Britney Spears	
4 February	"Scream & Shout"	will.i.am featuring Britney Spears	
11 February	"Get Up (Rattle)"	Bingo Players featuring Far East Movement	
18 February	"Get Up (Rattle)"	Bingo Players featuring Far East Movement	
25 February	"Get Up (Rattle)"	Bingo Players featuring Far East Movement	
4 March	"I Could Be the One"	Avicii vs. Nicky Romero	
11 March	"I Could Be the One"	Avicii vs. Nicky Romero	
18 March	"I Could Be the One"	Avicii vs. Nicky Romero	
25 March	"I Could Be the One"	Avicii vs. Nicky Romero	
1 April	"I Could Be the One"	Avicii vs. Nicky Romero	
8 April	"Hello"	Stafford Brothers featuring Lil Wayne & Christina Milian	
15 April	"Hello"	Stafford Brothers featuring Lil Wayne & Christina Milian	
22 April	"Hello"	Stafford Brothers featuring Lil Wayne & Christina Milian	
29 April	"Get Lucky"	Daft Punk featuring Pharrell Williams	
6 May	"Get Lucky"	Daft Punk featuring Pharrell Williams	
13 May	"Get Lucky"	Daft Punk featuring Pharrell Williams	
20 May	"Get Lucky"	Daft Punk featuring Pharrell Williams	
27 May	"Get Lucky"	Daft Punk featuring Pharrell Williams	
3 June	"Get Lucky"	Daft Punk featuring Pharrell Williams	
10 June	"Get Lucky"	Daft Punk featuring Pharrell Williams	
17 June	"Get Lucky"	Daft Punk featuring Pharrell Williams	
24 June	"Get Lucky"	Daft Punk featuring Pharrell Williams	
1 July	"Wake Me Up"	Avicii featuring Aloe Blacc	
8 July	"Wake Me Up"	Avicii featuring Aloe Blacc	
15 July	"Wake Me Up"	Avicii featuring Aloe Blacc	
22 July	"Wake Me Up"	Avicii featuring Aloe Blacc	
29 July	"Wake Me Up"	Avicii featuring Aloe Blacc	
5 August	"Wake Me Up"	Avicii featuring Aloe Blacc	
12 August	"Wake Me Up"	Avicii featuring Aloe Blacc	
19 August	"Wake Me Up"	Avicii featuring Aloe Blacc	
26 August	"Wake Me Up"	Avicii featuring Aloe Blacc	
2 September	"Wake Me Up"	Avicii featuring Aloe Blacc	
9 September	"Wake Me Up"	Avicii featuring Aloe Blacc	
16 September	"Let's Get Ridiculous"	Redfoo	
23 September	"Let's Get Ridiculous"	Redfoo	
30 September	"Let's Get Ridiculous"	Redfoo	
7 October	"Let's Get Ridiculous"	Redfoo	
14 October	"Let's Get Ridiculous"	Redfoo	
21 October	"Hey Brother"	Avicii	
28 October	"Hey Brother"	Avicii	
4 November	"Timber"	Pitbull featuring Kesha	
11 November	"Hey Brother"	Avicii	
18 November	"Hey Brother"	Avicii	
25 November	"Hey Brother"	Avicii	
2 December	"Hey Brother"	Avicii	
9 December	"Timber"	Pitbull featuring Kesha	
16 December	"Timber"	Pitbull featuring Kesha	
23 December	"Timber"	Pitbull featuring Kesha	
30 December	"Timber"	Pitbull featuring Kesha	

== Number-one artists ==
Position	Artist	Weeks at No. 1
1	Avicii	22
2	Daft Punk	9
3	Nicky Romero	5
3	Pitbull	5
3	Kesha (as featuring)	5
3	Redfoo	5
3	Will.I.Am	5
3	Britney Spears (as featuring)	5
4	Bingo Players	3
4	Stafford Brothers	3

== See also ==
- 2013 in music
- List of number-one singles of 2013 (Australia)
- List of number-one club tracks of 2013 (Australia)
