= All the Little Lights =

Studio album by Passenger
- Released: 24 February 2012
- Recorded: March 2011; 26 October 2011 ("I Hate")
- Venues: Linear Recording, Sydney
- Genres: Indie pop; indie folk
- Length: 45:24
- Labels: Nettwerk; Black Crow
- Producers: Mike Rosenberg; Chris Vallejo

Passenger chronology
Flight of the Crow (2010)	All the Little Lights (2012)	Whispers (2014)

Singles from All the Little Lights
- 1. "The Wrong Direction" Released: 20 January 2012; 2. "Let Her Go" Released: 24 July 2012; 3. "Holes" Released: 15 February 2013

All the Little Lights is the fourth studio album by English singer-songwriter Passenger and was released by Black Crow Records and Nettwerk on 24 February 2012. The album contains 12 tracks, comprising 11 studio tracks recorded at Sydney's Linear Recording, and one song recorded live at The Borderline in London. The album originally contains no guest appearances, but the re-recording version, released on 10 November 2023, features Ed Sheeran, Gabrielle Aplin, Foy Vance, and Nina Nesbitt.

A limited edition features a second disc containing acoustic versions of eight songs from the album.

== Critical reception ==
Professional ratings
Review scores
Source	Rating
Paste	7.3/10
PopMatters	9/10

All the Little Lights received positive reviews from music critics. John Walshe of Hot Press called it "a truly gorgeous record". Hilary Saunders of Paste said, "Luckily, Passenger serves as a very real, welcome alternative to reality TV talent shows, proving original songwriters do still exist". Jordan Blum of PopMatters called it "a masterful work of art, plain and simple".

== Track listing ==
All tracks are written by Mike Rosenberg.

No.	Title	Length
1.	"Things That Stop You Dreaming"	3:35
2.	"Let Her Go"	4:13
3.	"Staring at the Stars"	3:24
4.	"All the Little Lights"	3:56
5.	"The Wrong Direction"	3:41
6.	"Circles"	3:12
7.	"Keep on Walking"	4:08
8.	"Patient Love"	3:11
9.	"Life's for the Living"	4:34
10.	"Holes"	3:33
11.	"Feather on the Clyde"	5:02
12.	"I Hate" (Live from The Borderline, London)	3:33

Limited edition disc two
No.	Title	Length
1.	"Let Her Go" (Acoustic)	4:27
2.	"Staring at the Stars" (Acoustic)	2:44
3.	"All the Little Lights" (Acoustic)	3:19
4.	"Circles" (Acoustic)	3:08
5.	"Keep on Walking" (Acoustic)	3:55
6.	"Patient Love" (Acoustic)	3:19
7.	"Life's for the Living" (Acoustic)	4:29
8.	"Feather on the Clyde" (Acoustic)	3:46

== Personnel ==
Adapted credits from the media notes of All the Little Lights.

Passenger

- Mike Rosenberg – lead vocals, acoustic guitar, omnichord (tracks 1, 3, 5)

Additional musicians

- Stu Larsen – backing vocals
- Georgia Mooney – backing vocals
- Stuart Hunter – piano, keys, synths
- Cameron Undy – upright bass, electric bass
- Kerry Martin (violin), Madeleine Boud (violin), Shelley Soerensen (viola), Janine Boubbov (cello) – strings (tracks 1, 2, 3, 6)
- James Steendam – string arrangements (tracks 1, 2, 3, 6)
- Glenn Wilson – drums (tracks 1, 2, 3, 9, 10)
- Declan Kelly – drums (track 5)
- Tim Hart – drums (tracks 4, 7, 8), banjo (tracks 3, 6, 9), mandolin (track 6)
- Jess Ciampa – percussion (tracks 3, 6, 8, 11)
- Lucian McGuiness, Simon Ferenci, Sam Golding – brass (tracks 3, 7, 9, 10, 11)
- Alan Davey – trumpet (track 5)

== 2023 re-recording ==
A re-recorded version of the album was released on 10 November 2023, entitled All the Little Lights (Anniversary Edition). The album features song duets with Ed Sheeran ("Let Her Go"), Gabrielle Aplin ("Circles"), Foy Vance ("Life's for the Living") and Nina Nesbitt ("Feather on the Clyde").

== Charts ==
=== Weekly charts ===
Chart (2012–16)	Peak position
Australian Albums (ARIA)	2
Austrian Albums (Ö3 Austria)	6
Belgian Albums (Ultratop Flanders)	7
Belgian Albums (Ultratop Wallonia)	45
Canadian Albums (Billboard)	14
Danish Albums (Hitlisten)	9
French Albums (SNEP)	46
Dutch Albums (Album Top 100)	3
German Albums (Offizielle Top 100)	6
Ireland (IRMA)	2
Italian Albums (FIMI)	30
New Zealand Albums (RMNZ)	9
Norwegian Albums (VG-lista)	7
Polish Albums (ZPAV)	49
Portuguese Albums (AFP)	23
Scottish Albums (Official Charts)	3
South African Albums (RISA)	13
Spanish Albums (Promusicae)	13
Swedish Albums (Sverigetopplistan)	24
Swiss Albums (Schweizer Hitparade)	5
UK Albums (OCC)	3
UK Album Downloads (Official Charts)	2
UK Independent Albums (Official Charts)	1
US Billboard 200	26
US Americana/Folk Albums (Billboard)	1
US Independent Albums (Billboard)	3
US Top Rock Albums (Billboard)	5
Billboard Heatseekers Albums	1

=== Year-end charts ===
Chart (2012)	Position
Dutch Albums (Album Top 100)	50

Chart (2013)	Position
Australian Albums (ARIA)	10
Austrian Albums (Ö3 Austria)	24
Belgian Albums (Ultratop Flanders)	31
Belgian Albums (Ultratop Wallonia)	118
Dutch Albums (Album Top 100)	14
French Albums (SNEP)	129
German Albums (Offizielle Top 100)	16
Swedish Albums (Sverigetopplistan)	76
Swiss Albums (Schweizer Hitparade)	10
UK Albums (OCC)	19
US Folk Albums (Billboard)	9
US Independent Albums (Billboard)	42

Chart (2014)	Position
Belgian Albums (Ultratop Flanders)	146
Dutch Albums (Album Top 100)	69
Swedish Albums (Sverigetopplistan)	82
Swiss Albums (Schweizer Hitparade)	94
UK Albums (OCC)	74
US Billboard 200	83
US Folk Albums (Billboard)	1
US Independent Albums (Billboard)	7
US Top Rock Albums (Billboard)	15

=== Decade-end charts ===
Chart (2010–2019)	Position
Australian Albums (ARIA)	81

== Certifications ==
Region	Certification	Certified units/sales
Australia (ARIA)	2× Platinum	140,000^{^}
Austria (IFPI Austria)	Gold	10,000^{*}
Canada (Music Canada)	Platinum	80,000^{^}
Denmark (IFPI Danmark)	2× Platinum	40,000^{‡}
Germany (BVMI)	Platinum	200,000^{^}
Netherlands (NVPI)	Platinum	50,000^{^}
Norway (IFPI Norway)	Gold	15,000^{‡}
Poland (ZPAV)	3× Platinum	60,000^{‡}
Singapore (RIAS)	Gold	5,000^{*}
Sweden (GLF)	Gold	20,000^{‡}
Switzerland (IFPI Switzerland)	Gold	15,000^{^}
United Kingdom (BPI)	Platinum	516,506
United States (RIAA)	Platinum	1,000,000^{‡}
^{*} Sales figures based on certification alone.^{^} Shipments figures based on certification alone.^{‡} Sales+streaming figures based on certification alone.
