= List of top 25 albums for 2013 in Australia =

Top 25 albums of 2013 < 2012 2014 >

Other Australian top charts for 2013
- top 25 singles
- Triple J Hottest 100

Australian number-one charts of 2013
- albums
- singles
- urban singles
- dance singles
- club tracks
- digital tracks
- streaming tracks

The following lists the top 25 albums of 2013 in Australia, as determined by Australian Recording Industry Association (ARIA) end-of-year albums chart.

Pink's album The Truth About Love was the most popular album for Australian music buyers for the second year in a row. Pink is the first artist to achieve this feat. With The Truth About Love, Pink had had an album placed in the top two of the ARIA End of Year Albums Chart for six out of the past seven years.

== Top 25 ==
#	Title	Artist	Highest pos. reached
1	The Truth About Love	Pink	1
2	Prism	Katy Perry	1
3	Unorthodox Jukebox	Bruno Mars	1
4	To Be Loved	Michael Bublé	1
5	Random Access Memories	Daft Punk	1
6	Midnight Memories	One Direction	1
7	Christmas	Michael Bublé	1
8	The Marshall Mathers LP2	Eminem	1
9	Pure Heroine	Lorde	1
10	All the Little Lights	Passenger	2
11	Flume	Flume	1
12	+	Ed Sheeran	1
13	The Heist	Macklemore and Ryan Lewis	2
14	25 Years – The Chain	Fleetwood Mac	2
15	Willy Nilly: The 12th Man's Biggest Hits	The 12th Man	3
16	The Christmas Album	Human Nature	4
17	Dami Im	Dami Im	1
18	My Head Is an Animal	Of Monsters and Men	1
19	Greatest Hits... So Far!!!	Pink	1
20	Taylor Henderson	Taylor Henderson	1
21	Night Visions	Imagine Dragons	4
22	More Than a Dream	Harrison Craig	1
23	Beyoncé	Beyoncé	1
24	Red	Taylor Swift	1
25	Moon Landing	James Blunt	2

== See also ==
- List of number-one albums of 2013 (Australia)
- List of Top 25 singles for 2013 in Australia
