= List of number-one albums of 2013 (Australia) =

ARIA Charts number-one albums of 2013 < 2012 2014 >

Other Australian number-one charts of 2013
- singles
- urban singles
- dance singles
- club tracks
- digital tracks
- streaming tracks

Top Australian singles and albums of 2013
- Triple J Hottest 100
- top 25 singles
- top 25 albums

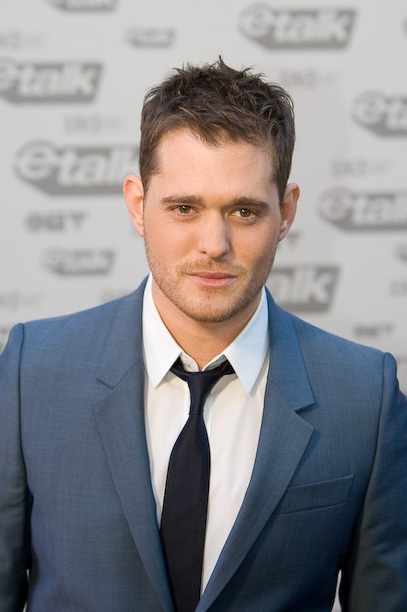
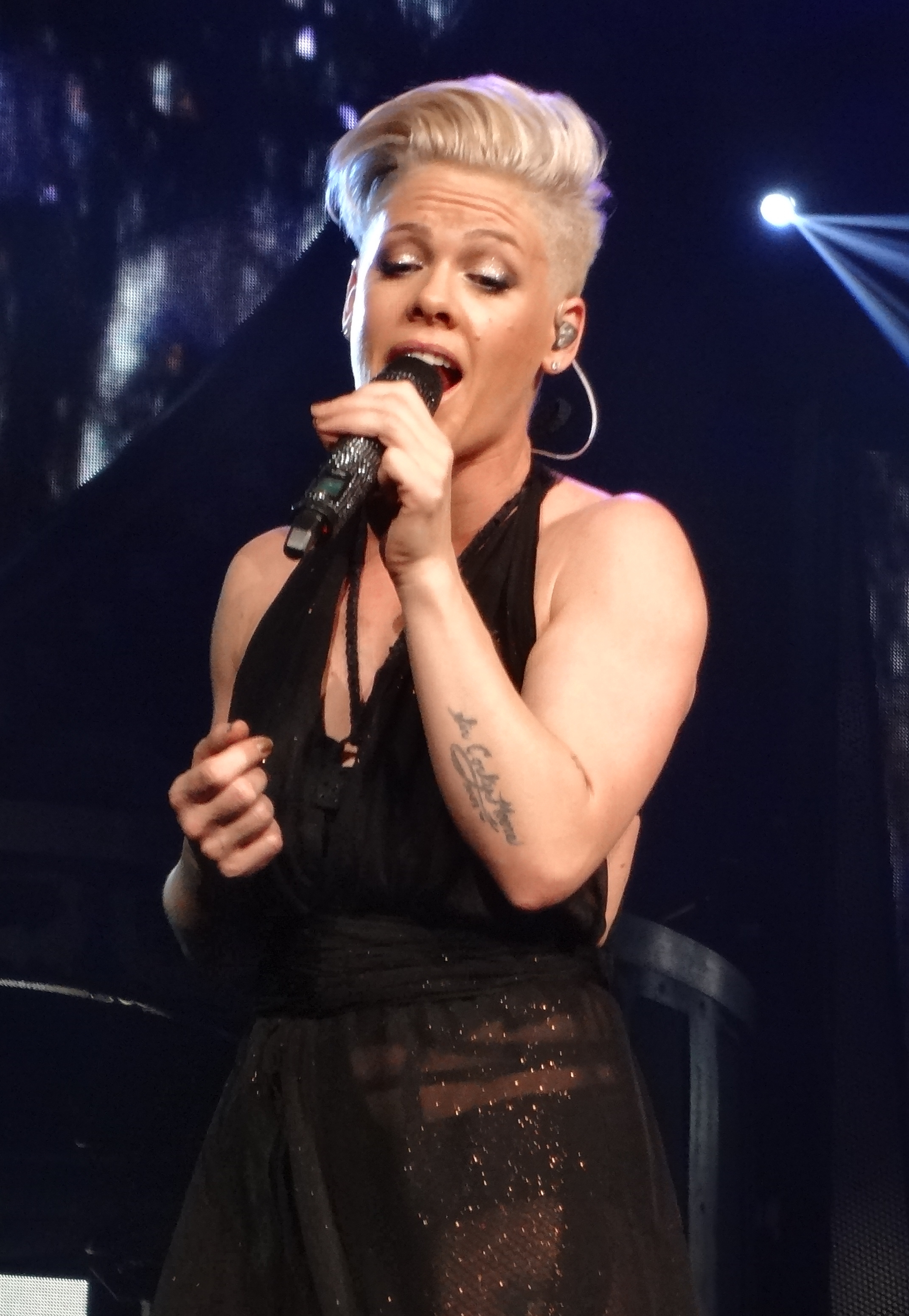
Michael Bublé's (left) To Be Loved tied with Pink's (right) The Truth About Love as the longest-running number-one album of the year.

The ARIA Albums Chart ranks the best-performing albums and extended plays in Australia. Its data, published by the Australian Recording Industry Association, is based collectively on each album and EP's weekly physical and digital sales. In 2013, thirty-six albums claimed the top spot, including Michael Bublé's Christmas and Pink's The Truth About Love, both of which started their peak positions in 2011 and 2012, respectively. Sixteen acts achieved their first number-one album in Australia: Bruno Mars, Flume, Of Monsters and Men, Foals, Nick Cave and the Bad Seeds, Birds of Tokyo, Daft Punk, Queens of the Stone Age, Kanye West, Harrison Craig, Karnivool, RÜFÜS, Boy & Bear, Lorde, Dami Im and Taylor Henderson.

Michael Bublé had two number-one albums during the year for To Be Loved and Christmas. Bublé's To Be Loved and Pink's The Truth About Love tied for the longest-running number-one album of 2013, both spending five weeks atop the ARIA Albums Chart. Bruno Mars' Unorthodox Jukebox and Bublé's Christmas topped the chart for three consecutive weeks. Justin Timberlake's The 20/20 Experience, Daft Punk's Random Access Memories, Harrison Craig's More Than a Dream and Eminem's The Marshall Mathers LP 2 each spent two weeks at number one.

== Chart history ==
Key
The yellow background indicates the #1 album on ARIA's End of Year Albums Chart of 2013.

Date	Album	Artist(s)	Ref.
7 January	The Truth About Love	Pink	
14 January	Unorthodox Jukebox	Bruno Mars	
21 January	Unorthodox Jukebox	Bruno Mars	
28 January	Unorthodox Jukebox	Bruno Mars	
4 February	Flume	Flume	
11 February	My Head Is an Animal	Of Monsters and Men	
18 February	Holy Fire	Foals	
25 February	Push the Sky Away	Nick Cave and the Bad Seeds	
4 March	Zion	Hillsong United	
11 March	March Fires	Birds of Tokyo	
18 March	What About Now	Bon Jovi	
25 March	The 20/20 Experience	Justin Timberlake	
1 April	The 20/20 Experience	Justin Timberlake	
8 April	Sempiternal	Bring Me the Horizon	
15 April	Paramore	Paramore	
22 April	To Be Loved	Michael Bublé	
29 April	To Be Loved	Michael Bublé	
6 May	To Be Loved	Michael Bublé	
13 May	To Be Loved	Michael Bublé	
20 May	To Be Loved	Michael Bublé	
27 May	Random Access Memories	Daft Punk	
3 June	Random Access Memories	Daft Punk	
10 June	...Like Clockwork	Queens of the Stone Age	
17 June	Departures	Bernard Fanning	
24 June	Yeezus	Kanye West	
1 July	More Than a Dream	Harrison Craig	
8 July	Circus in the Sky	Bliss n Eso	
15 July	More Than a Dream	Harrison Craig	
22 July	The Truth About Love	Pink	
29 July	Asymmetry	Karnivool	
5 August	The Truth About Love	Pink	
12 August	The Truth About Love	Pink	
19 August	Atlas	RÜFÜS	
26 August	Harlequin Dream	Boy & Bear	
2 September	Paradise Valley	John Mayer	
9 September	The Truth About Love	Pink	
16 September	AM	Arctic Monkeys	
23 September	Fuse	Keith Urban	
30 September	Mechanical Bull	Kings of Leon	
7 October	Pure Heroine	Lorde	
14 October	Bangerz	Miley Cyrus	
21 October	Lightning Bolt	Pearl Jam	
28 October	Triple J Like a Version 9	Various artists	
4 November	Prism	Katy Perry	
11 November	The Marshall Mathers LP 2	Eminem	
18 November	The Marshall Mathers LP 2	Eminem	
25 November	Dami Im	Dami Im	
2 December	Midnight Memories	One Direction	
9 December	Taylor Henderson	Taylor Henderson	
16 December	Christmas	Michael Bublé	
23 December	Christmas	Michael Bublé	
30 December	Christmas	Michael Bublé	

== Number-one artists ==
Position	Artist	Weeks at No. 1
1	Michael Bublé	8
2	Pink	5
3	Bruno Mars	3
4	Daft Punk	2
4	Harrison Craig	2
4	Justin Timberlake	2
4	Eminem	2
5	Flume	1
5	Of Monsters and Men	1
5	Foals	1
5	Nick Cave and the Bad Seeds	1
5	Hillsong United	1
5	Birds of Tokyo	1
5	Bon Jovi	1
5	Bring Me the Horizon	1
5	Paramore	1
5	Queens of the Stone Age	1
5	Bernard Fanning	1
5	Kanye West	1
5	Bliss n Eso	1
5	Karnivool	1
5	RÜFÜS	1
5	Boy & Bear	1
5	John Mayer	1
5	Arctic Monkeys	1
5	Keith Urban	1
5	Kings of Leon	1
5	Lorde	1
5	Miley Cyrus	1
5	Pearl Jam	1
5	Katy Perry	1
5	Dami Im	1
5	One Direction	1
5	Taylor Henderson	1

== See also ==
- 2013 in music
- List of number-one singles of 2013 (Australia)
- List of Top 25 albums for 2013 in Australia
