= List of number-one urban singles of 2013 (Australia) =

ARIA Charts number-one urban singles of 2013 < 2012 2014 >

Other Australian number-one charts of 2013
- albums
- singles
- dance singles
- club tracks
- digital tracks
- streaming tracks

Top Australian singles and albums of 2013
- Triple J Hottest 100
- top 25 singles
- top 25 albums

The ARIA Urban Chart is a chart that ranks the best-performing Urban tracks singles of Australia. It is published by Australian Recording Industry Association (ARIA), an organisation who collect music data for the weekly ARIA Charts. To be eligible to appear on the chart, the recording must be a single, and be "predominantly of a Urban nature."

== Chart history ==
Issue date	Song	Artist(s)	Reference
7 January	"Thrift Shop"	Macklemore & Ryan Lewis & Wanz	
14 January	"Thrift Shop"	Macklemore & Ryan Lewis & Wanz	
21 January	"Thrift Shop"	Macklemore & Ryan Lewis & Wanz	
28 January	"Thrift Shop"	Macklemore & Ryan Lewis & Wanz	
4 February	"Thrift Shop"	Macklemore & Ryan Lewis & Wanz	
11 February	"Thrift Shop"	Macklemore & Ryan Lewis & Wanz	
18 February	"Thrift Shop"	Macklemore & Ryan Lewis & Wanz	
25 February	"Thrift Shop"	Macklemore & Ryan Lewis & Wanz	
4 March	"Thrift Shop"	Macklemore & Ryan Lewis & Wanz	
11 March	"Hey Porsche"	Nelly	
18 March	"Hey Porsche"	Nelly	
25 March	"Hey Porsche"	Nelly	
1 April	"Hey Porsche"	Nelly	
8 April	"Hey Porsche"	Nelly	
15 April	"Hey Porsche"	Nelly	
22 April	"Hey Porsche"	Nelly	
29 April	"Hey Porsche"	Nelly	
6 May	"Mirrors"	Justin Timberlake	
13 May	"#thatPOWER"	will.i.am featuring Justin Bieber	
20 May	"#thatPOWER"	will.i.am featuring Justin Bieber	
27 May	"#thatPOWER"	will.i.am featuring Justin Bieber	
3 June	"Blurred Lines"	Robin Thicke featuring Pharrell & T.I.	
10 June	"Blurred Lines"	Robin Thicke featuring Pharrell & T.I.	
17 June	"Blurred Lines"	Robin Thicke featuring Pharrell & T.I.	
24 June	"Blurred Lines"	Robin Thicke featuring Pharrell & T.I.	
1 July	"Blurred Lines"	Robin Thicke featuring Pharrell & T.I.	
8 July	"Blurred Lines"	Robin Thicke featuring Pharrell & T.I.	
15 July	"Blurred Lines"	Robin Thicke featuring Pharrell & T.I.	
22 July	"Blurred Lines"	Robin Thicke featuring Pharrell & T.I.	
29 July	"Blurred Lines"	Robin Thicke featuring Pharrell & T.I.	
5 August	"Blurred Lines"	Robin Thicke featuring Pharrell & T.I.	
12 August	"Blurred Lines"	Robin Thicke featuring Pharrell & T.I.	
19 August	"Can't Believe It"	Flo Rida featuring Pitbull	
26 August	"Can't Believe It"	Flo Rida featuring Pitbull	
2 September	"Can't Believe It"	Flo Rida featuring Pitbull	
9 September	"Berzerk"	Eminem	
16 September	"Berzerk"	Eminem	
23 September	"Hold On, We're Going Home"	Drake featuring Majid Jordan	
30 September	"Hold On, We're Going Home"	Drake featuring Majid Jordan	
7 October	"Hold On, We're Going Home"	Drake featuring Majid Jordan	
14 October	"Hold On, We're Going Home"	Drake featuring Majid Jordan	
21 October	"Hold On, We're Going Home"	Drake featuring Majid Jordan	
28 October	"Hold On, We're Going Home"	Drake featuring Majid Jordan	
4 November	"Everybody"	Justice Crew	
11 November	"The Monster"	Eminem featuring Rihanna	
18 November	"The Monster"	Eminem featuring Rihanna	
25 November	"The Monster"	Eminem featuring Rihanna	
2 December	"The Monster"	Eminem featuring Rihanna	
9 December	"All of Me"	John Legend	
16 December	"All of Me"	John Legend	
23 December	"All of Me"	John Legend	
30 December	"Trumpets"	Jason Derulo	

== Number-one artists ==
Position	Artist	Weeks at No. 1
1	Robin Thicke	11
1	Pharrell Williams	11
1	T.I.	11
2	Macklemore & Ryan Lewis	9
2	Wanz	9
3	Nelly	8
4	Eminem	6
5	Drake	5
5	Majid Jordan	5
6	Rihanna	4
7	Flo Rida	3
7	Pitbull	3
7	Will.I.Am	3
7	Justin Bieber	3
8	Jason Derulo	1
8	Justice Crew	1
8	Justin Timberlake	1

== See also ==
- 2013 in music
- List of number-one singles of 2013 (Australia)
