= List of number-one club tracks of 2013 (Australia) =

ARIA Charts number-one club tracks of 2013 < 2012 2014 >

Other Australian number-one charts of 2013
- albums
- singles
- urban singles
- dance singles
- digital tracks
- streaming tracks

Top Australian singles and albums of 2013
- Triple J Hottest 100
- top 25 singles
- top 25 albums

This is the list of number-one tracks on the ARIA Club Chart in 2013, and is compiled by the Australian Recording Industry Association (ARIA) from weekly DJ reports.

== 2013 ==
Date		Song	Artist(s)	Reference
January	14	"The Way You Are"	Peking Duk	
January	21	"The Way You Are"	Peking Duk	
January	28	"I Could Be the One"	Avicii and Nicky Romero	
February	4	"I Could Be the One"	Avicii and Nicky Romero	
February	11	"I Could Be the One"	Avicii and Nicky Romero	
February	18	"Looking Back"	The Only	
February	25	"I Could Be The One"	Avicii and Nicky Romero	
March	4	"I Could Be The One"	Avicii and Nicky Romero	
March	11	"I Could Be The One"	Avicii and Nicky Romero	
March	18	"Snapback"	Timmy Trumpet	
March	25	"Snapback"	Timmy Trumpet	
April	1	"Snapback"	Timmy Trumpet	
April	8	"Snapback"	Timmy Trumpet	
April	15	"Snapback"	Timmy Trumpet	
April	22	"Snapback"	Timmy Trumpet	
April	29	"Hello"	The Stafford Brothers featuring Lil Wayne and Christina Milian	
May	6	"Hello"	The Stafford Brothers featuring Lil Wayne and Christina Milian	
May	13	"Get Lucky"	Daft Punk featuring Pharrell Williams	
May	20	"Get Lucky"	Daft Punk featuring Pharrell Williams	
May	27	"Get Lucky"	Daft Punk featuring Pharrell Williams	
June	3	"Get Lucky"	Daft Punk featuring Pharrell Williams	
June	10	"Get Lucky"	Daft Punk featuring Pharrell Williams	
June	17	"Jumanji"	J-Trick & Taco Cat featuring Feral Is Kinky	
June	24	"Jumanji"	J-Trick & Taco Cat featuring Feral Is Kinky	
July	1	"Jumanji"	J-Trick & Taco Cat featuring Feral Is Kinky	
July	8	"Melbournia"	Timmy Trumpet and Chardy	
July	15	"Melbournia"	Timmy Trumpet and Chardy	
July	22	"Animals"	Martin Garrix	
July	29	"Animals"	Martin Garrix	
August	5	"Animals"	Martin Garrix	
August	12	"What's Up Suckaz"	TJR	
August	19	"What's Up Suckaz"	TJR	
August	26	"What's Up Suckaz"	TJR	
September	2	"What's Up Suckaz"	TJR	
September	9	"What's Up Suckaz"	TJR	
September	16	"Feels Like"	Peking Duk	
September	23	"Feels Like"	Peking Duk	
September	30	"Feels Like"	Peking Duk	
October	7	"Feels Like"	Peking Duk	
October	14	"Feels Like"	Peking Duk	
October	21	"Feels Like"	Peking Duk	
October	28	"Feels Like"	Peking Duk	
November	4	"Feels Like"	Peking Duk	
November	11	"Under Control"	Calvin Harris and Alesso featuring Hurts	
November	18	"Under Control"	Calvin Harris and Alesso featuring Hurts	
November	25	"Under Control"	Calvin Harris and Alesso featuring Hurts	
December	2	"Under Control"	Calvin Harris and Alesso featuring Hurts	
December	9	"Under Control"	Calvin Harris and Alesso featuring Hurts	
December	16	"Under Control"	Calvin Harris and Alesso featuring Hurts	
December	23	"Under Control"	Calvin Harris and Alesso featuring Hurts	

== Number-one artists ==
Position	Artist	Weeks at No. 1
1	Peking Duk	10
2	Timmy Trumpet	8
3	Calvin Harris	7
3	Alesso	7
4	Avicii	6
4	Nicky Romero	6
5	Daft Punk	5
5	TJR	5
6	J-Trick	3
6	Martin Garrix	3
7	The Stafford Brothers	2
8	The Only	1

== See also ==
- ARIA Charts
- List of number-one singles of 2013 (Australia)
- List of number-one albums of 2013 (Australia)
- 2013 in music
