= Let Her Go =

Single by Passenger

from the album All the Little Lights
- Released: July 24, 2012
- Recorded: 2011
- Studio: Linear Recording, Sydney
- Genre: Folk rock; soft rock
- Length: 4:12 (album and video version); 3:37 (radio edit)
- Label: Embassy of Music; Black Crow; Nettwerk
- Songwriter: Michael Rosenberg
- Producers: Mike Rosenberg; Chris Vallejo

Passenger singles chronology
"The Wrong Direction" (2012)	"Let Her Go" (2012)	"Holes" (2013)

Music video
- "Let Her Go" on YouTube

Audio sample
- 18-second sample from Passenger's "Let Her Go": file; help

"Let Her Go" is a song recorded by English singer-songwriter Passenger. It was recorded at Sydney's Linear Recording and co-produced by Passenger (as Mike Rosenberg) and Chris Vallejo. The recording features Australian musicians Stu Larsen, Georgia Mooney, Stu Hunter, Cameron Undy, and Glenn Wilson. "Let Her Go" was released on 24 July 2012 as the second single from Passenger's fourth album, All the Little Lights.

The song became a sleeper hit, achieving international success and topping the charts in many countries around the world. As of July 2014, it has sold over one million digital copies in the UK, and over four million in the US. In 2014, the song was nominated for the Brit Award for British Single of the Year, and won Passenger the British Academy's Ivor Novello Award for Most Performed Work. In 2023, to celebrate the 10th anniversary of the song, Passenger released a remix version with English singer Ed Sheeran.

== Commercial performance ==
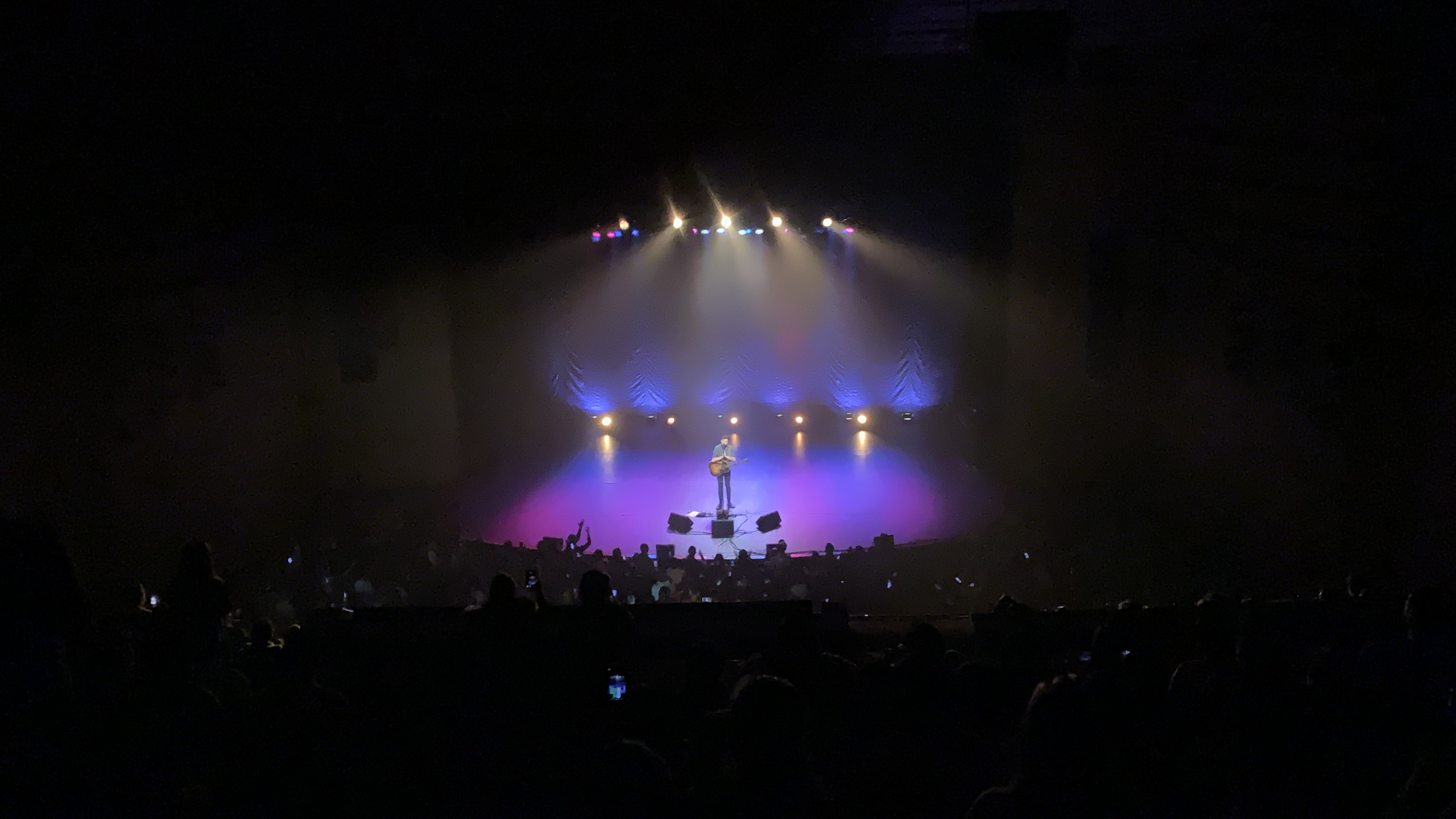
Passenger performing "Let Her Go" live in Bogotá, Colombia during his Runaway Tour.

"Let Her Go" was released in July 2012 as the second single from Passenger's third album All the Little Lights. The song became a hit first in the Netherlands after Dave, a Dutch fan, e-mailed Passenger expressing his wish to introduce the song to some Dutch radio stations, claiming it could be a hit there. This resulted in the song trending on Dutch stations and finding enormous commercial success with the Dutch public. The song reached number two in the Dutch Top 40 in November 2012, spending a total of four non-consecutive weeks at that position. The next month that year, it topped at number one.

Since 2013, and after initial success in the Netherlands, "Let Her Go" has reached number one in Australia, Austria, Belgium, Czech Republic, Denmark, Finland, Germany, Greece, Ireland, Israel, Italy, Luxembourg, Mexico, New Zealand, Norway, Slovakia, Sweden and Switzerland, number two in the UK Singles Chart, number five in the US on the Billboard Hot 100 and number one on Billboard Hot Rock Songs, making it Passenger's first international success. The song has sold over 1 million digital copies in the UK, and over 4 million in the US as of July 2014. In October 2019, "Let Her Go" surpassed one billion streams on the music service Spotify, making it one of the most played songs on the service.

== Music video ==
The music video was uploaded on the day after the single, directed and produced by the Australian video artist Dave Jensen and Tavic. It shows the stage being prepared for a Passenger concert, with footage of Passenger performance with his backing band and shots of the audience present reacting.

As of June 2026, the video has received over 4 billion views on the video-sharing website YouTube, making it the 28th most viewed video ever on the site.

== Track listing ==
Digital promo
No.	Title	Length
1.	"Let Her Go"	4:13

CD single
No.	Title	Length
1.	"Let Her Go" (album version)	4:12
2.	"Let Her Go" (acoustic)	4:27

Digital download
No.	Title	Length
1.	"Let Her Go"	4:13
2.	"Let Her Go" (acoustic)	4:27
3.	"Let Her Go" (live version)	4:05
4.	"Let Her Go (anniversary edition) (featuring Ed Sheeran)" (acoustic)	4:17

== Cover versions ==
British singer Birdy recorded a cover version called "Let Him Go" in 2013 on BBC Radio 1's Live Lounge.

An unreleased acoustic version of the song was donated to support college radio in the USA on the 2013 College Radio Day Vol. 2 album. The song was limited to being on only the CD version of the album (only 1,500 copies have been pressed).

In August 2014, Glen Templeton made a country cover of the song.

American trance singer JES released her cover version of the song titled "Let Him Go" in 2019.

The song is sampled heavily in Central Cee's 2022 single "Let Go".

== Confusion with "Let It Go" ==
"Let Her Go" is regularly confused with Idina Menzel's hit song "Let It Go" from the Disney Animation film Frozen. At the 2018 Newport Folk Festival, Passenger introduced himself to the crowd, then explained: "I've only had one hit, so that's a bit embarrassing. And it's called 'Let Her Go', not 'Let It Go' from Frozen. Amazing how people get them mixed up. She's a Disney princess, and I'm an Englishman with a beard." Passenger again joked about the long-running confusion while performing at the Fox Oakland Theatre in September 2024 as part of his Anniversary Tour.

== In popular culture ==
"Let Her Go" was used in a Budweiser commercial shown during Super Bowl XLVIII entitled "Puppy Love", which showed the friendship between a Labrador Retriever puppy and one of the Budweiser Clydesdales. It was used also in the season 7 finale of the Canadian television show Heartland as the send-off song and in "500 Years of Solitude", the 100th episode of The Vampire Diaries.

Bluegrass band the Travelin' McCourys recorded the song at a Nashville studio, the Butcher Shoppe releasing the version on 13 January 2017.

== Charts ==
=== Weekly charts ===
Weekly chart performance for "Let Her Go"
Chart (2012–2021)	Peak position
Australia (ARIA)	1
Austria (Ö3 Austria Top 40)	1
Belgium (Ultratop 50 Flanders)	1
Belgium (Ultratop 50 Wallonia)	11
Canada Hot 100 (Billboard)	5
Canada AC (Billboard)	4
Canada CHR/Top 40 (Billboard)	7
Canada Hot AC (Billboard)	4
Czech Republic Airplay (ČNS IFPI)	1
Czech Republic Singles Digital (ČNS IFPI)	22
Denmark (Tracklisten)	1
Euro Digital Song Sales (Billboard)	2
Finland (Suomen virallinen lista)	1
France (SNEP)	6
Germany (GfK)	1
Greece Digital (Billboard)	1
Global 200 (Billboard)	169
Global Excl. US (Billboard)	139
Hungary (Single Top 40)	18
Ireland (IRMA)	1
Israel International Airplay (Media Forest)	2
Italy (FIMI)	1
Lebanon Airplay (Lebanese Top 20)	3
Luxembourg Digital (Billboard)	1
Malaysia (Malay Muzik Official Chart)	1
Mexico (Billboard Ingles Airplay)	1
Mexico Anglo (Monitor Latino)	5
Netherlands (Dutch Top 40)	1
Netherlands (Single Top 100)	2
New Zealand (Recorded Music NZ)	1
Norway (VG-lista)	1
Poland Airplay (ZPAV)	4
Portugal Digital (Billboard)	4
Romania Airplay (Media Forest)	1
Romania TV Airplay (Media Forest)	1
Scottish Singles Sales (Official Charts)	2
Slovakia Airplay (ČNS IFPI)	2
Slovakia Singles Digital (ČNS IFPI)	51
Slovenia (SloTop50)	5
South Africa Airplay (EMA)	5
Spain (Promusicae)	3
Sweden (Sverigetopplistan)	1
Switzerland (Schweizer Hitparade)	1
UK Singles (Official Charts)	2
UK Indie (Official Charts)	1
US Billboard Hot 100	5
US Hot Rock & Alternative Songs (Billboard)	1
US Rock & Alternative Airplay (Billboard)	33
US Adult Contemporary (Billboard)	1
US Adult Pop Airplay (Billboard)	1
US Pop Airplay (Billboard)	8
Venezuela Pop/Rock General (Record Report)	1

2023 Weekly chart performance for "Let Her Go"
Chart (2023)	Peak position
Romania Airplay (TopHit)	87

2025 Weekly chart performance for "Let Her Go"
Chart (2025)	Peak position
Israel International Airplay (Media Forest)	12

=== Year-end charts ===
Annual chart rankings for "Let Her Go"
Chart (2012)	Position
Belgium (Ultratop Flanders)	44
Netherlands (Dutch Top 40)	57
Netherlands (Single Top 100)	16

Chart (2013)	Position
Australia (ARIA)	3
Austria (Ö3 Austria Top 40)	4
Belgium (Ultratop Flanders)	12
Belgium (Ultratop Wallonia)	25
Canada (Canadian Hot 100)	61
France (SNEP)	23
Germany (Media Control Charts)	5
Israel International Airplay (Media Forest)	5
Italy (FIMI)	20
Netherlands (Dutch Top 40)	30
Netherlands (Single Top 100)	23
New Zealand (Recorded Music NZ)	6
Slovenia (SloTop50)	6
Spain (PROMUSICAE)	6
Sweden (Sverigetopplistan)	2
Switzerland (Schweizer Hitparade)	4
UK Singles (Official Charts Company)	4
US Billboard Hot 100	97
US Adult Top 40 (Billboard)	32
US Hot Rock Songs (Billboard)	16

Chart (2014)	Position
Belgium (Ultratop Wallonia)	88
Canada (Canadian Hot 100)	20
France (SNEP)	133
Italy (FIMI)	8
Netherlands (Single Top 100)	58
Slovenia (SloTop50)	38
Spain (PROMUSICAE)	35
Sweden (Sverigetopplistan)	55
Switzerland (Schweizer Hitparade)	52
US Billboard Hot 100	19
US Hot Rock Songs (Billboard)	4
US Adult Contemporary (Billboard)	5
US Adult Top 40 (Billboard)	15
US Mainstream Top 40 (Billboard)	37

Chart (2015)	Position
Italy (FIMI)	98

Chart (2016)	Position
France (SNEP)	173

=== Decade-end charts ===
Chart (2010–2019)	Position
Australia (ARIA)	9
Germany (Official German Charts)	26
Israel (Galgalatz)	6
Netherlands (Single Top 100)	10
UK Singles (Official Charts Company)	19
US Hot Rock Songs (Billboard)	32

=== All-time charts ===
Chart	Position
US Adult Pop Airplay (Billboard)	48
UK Singles (Official Charts Company)	79

== Certifications ==
Region	Certification	Certified units/sales
Australia (ARIA)	7× Platinum	490,000^{^}
Austria (IFPI Austria)	Platinum	30,000^{*}
Belgium (BRMA)	2× Platinum	40,000^{‡}
Canada (Music Canada)	Diamond	800,000^{‡}
Denmark (IFPI Danmark)	7× Platinum	630,000^{‡}
Finland (Musiikkituottajat)	Gold	5,057
France (SNEP)	Gold	75,000^{*}
Germany (BVMI)	Diamond	1,000,000^{‡}
Italy (FIMI)	6× Platinum	300,000^{‡}
Netherlands (NVPI)	Platinum	20,000^{^}
New Zealand (RMNZ)	9× Platinum	270,000^{‡}
Norway (IFPI Norway)	2× Platinum	20,000^{*}
Spain (Promusicae)	5× Platinum	300,000^{‡}
Sweden (GLF)	5× Platinum	200,000^{‡}
Switzerland (IFPI Switzerland)	3× Platinum	90,000^{^}
United Kingdom (BPI)	7× Platinum	4,200,000^{‡}
United States (RIAA)	6× Platinum	4,000,000
^{*} Sales figures based on certification alone.^{^} Shipments figures based on certification alone.^{‡} Sales+streaming figures based on certification alone.

== Release history ==
Region	Release date	Format
United States	24 July 2012	Digital download
Europe	5 November 2012	Digital download
United Kingdom	25 February 2013	CD
United States	24 September 2013	Contemporary hit radio
Canada	13 May 2013	Contemporary hit radio

== See also ==
- List of best-selling singles in Australia
- List of Billboard Adult Contemporary number ones of 2014
