= Let's Get Ridiculous =

Single by Redfoo
- Released: September 8, 2013
- Recorded: 2013
- Genre: EDM
- Length: 3:36 (radio edit); 7:41 (video version)
- Label: Interscope
- Songwriter: Stefan Gordy
- Producer: Redfoo

Redfoo singles chronology
"I'll Award You with My Body" (2013)	"Let's Get Ridiculous" (2013)	"Drop Girl" (2014)

"Let's Get Ridiculous" is a song by American rapper Redfoo, also known for being half of the duo LMFAO. It was released on September 8, 2013. The song, written and produced by himself, debuted at number 1 on the Australian Singles Chart. This song is currently the theme song for AC ROC, a professional wrestling independent wrestling tag team at Monster Factory. In 2018 it was used by MTV in promos for Jersey Shore Family Vacation.

== Music video ==
The music video for this song was shot in Manly, New South Wales, whilst Redfoo was featured as a judge on the fifth season of The X Factor Australia. His then-girlfriend, former world number one tennis player, Victoria Azarenka, makes a cameo appearance in the video clip as a flight attendant.

The Footy Show panellist Darryl Brohman parodied the song's music video in early February 2014, which was also shot in Manly, New South Wales. Its lyrics references the famous refereeing outbursts made by Manly-Warringah Sea Eagles coach Geoff Toovey during a National Rugby League (NRL) match in August 2013.

The music video was released on Redfoo's YouTube channel on October 25, 2013 and has reached more than 151 million views as of February 2026.

=== Synopsis ===
The plot of the video involves Stefan Gordy, who is being charged for crimes against conformity which was contributed to the worldwide epidemic, escapes from the Boeing 747-8 while he was being deported. Now a free, but wanted man, he lands on Manly, NSW after taking a selfie with his smartwatch, and ends up being chased by the police upon greeting them and seeing the wanted poster of Gordy himself, which attracts huge attention to his fans in Australia, whom they also chased after him, and while he was dancing with nearby people, and eventually with the crowd of Redfoo's fans (which implies with the lyrics saying "Crazy, loud, get wild in the crowd.").

== Chart performance ==
=== Weekly charts ===
Weekly chart performance for "Let's Get Ridiculous"
Chart (2013)	Peak position
Australia (ARIA)	1
Belgium (Ultratop 50 Flanders)	31
Belgium (Ultratop 50 Wallonia)	49
France (SNEP)	106
Netherlands (Single Top 100)	97
New Zealand (Recorded Music NZ)	31
US Hot Dance/Electronic Songs (Billboard)	48

=== Year-end charts ===
Year-end chart performance for "Let's Get Ridiculous"
Chart (2013)	Position
Australia (ARIA)	23

== Certifications ==
Certifications for "Let's Get Ridiculous"
Region	Certification	Certified units/sales
Australia (ARIA)	4× Platinum	280,000^{^}
New Zealand (RMNZ)	Gold	7,500^{*}
^{*} Sales figures based on certification alone.^{^} Shipments figures based on certification alone.

== Release history ==
Release history and formats for "Let's Get Ridiculous"
Region	Date	Format	Label
Australia	September 8, 2013	Digital download	Interscope
