= Passenger discography =

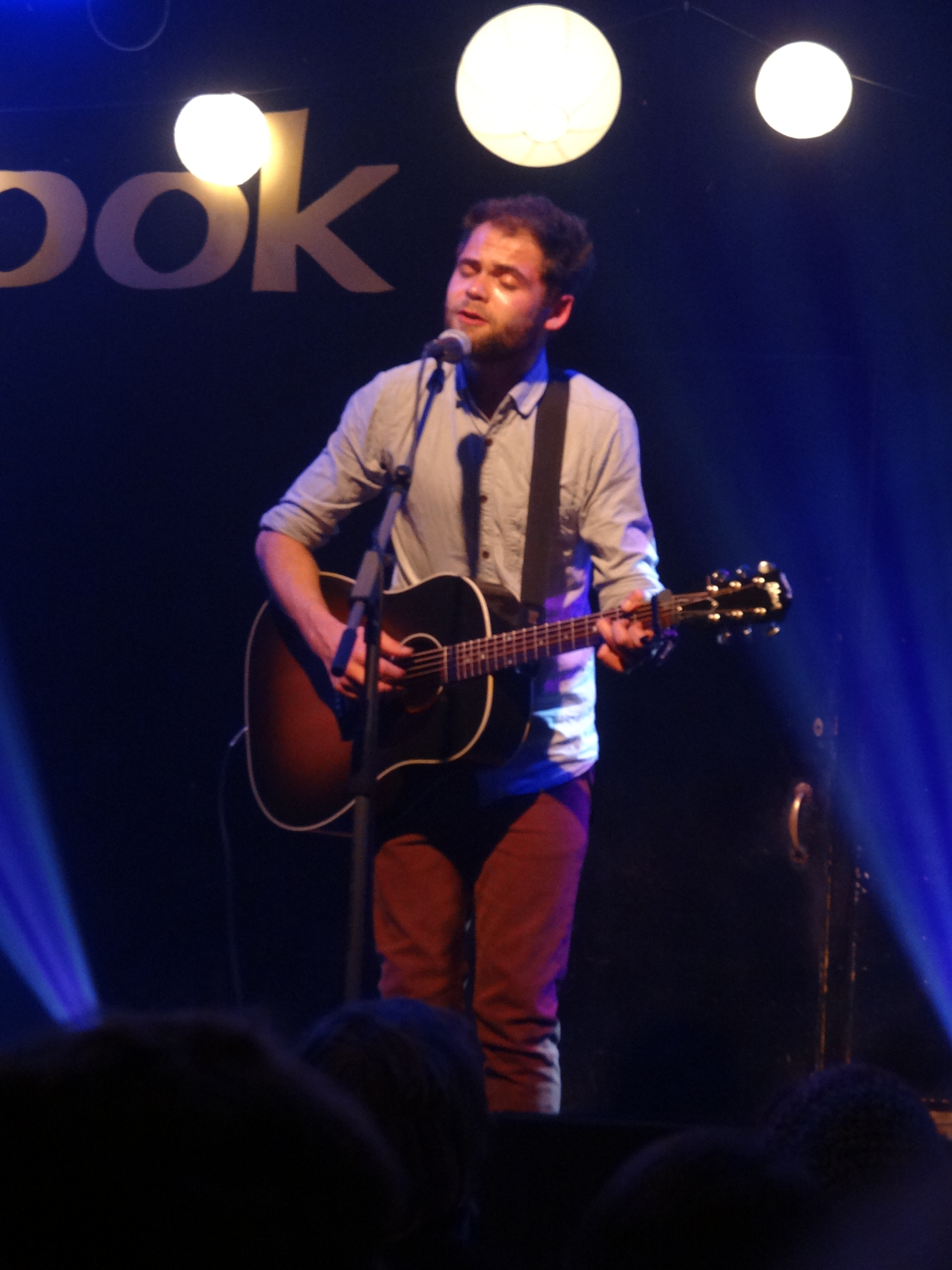
- Rosenberg performing in 2013
- Studio albums: 14
- Singles: 17
- Music videos: 29

English singer-songwriter Passenger has released fourteen studio albums and 17 singles. He is best known for his 2012 single "Let Her Go", which reached number one in Australia, Austria, Belgium, the Czech Republic, Denmark, Finland, Germany, Greece, Ireland, Israel, Italy, Luxembourg, Mexico, New Zealand, Norway, Sweden, Switzerland and The Netherlands; number 2 on the UK Singles Chart; and number 5 in the US on the Billboard Hot 100.

Rosenberg first performed in public when he was 16. He founded the band Passenger with Andrew Phillips in 2003 in Brighton and Hove. The five-person band's debut and only album, Wicked Man's Rest, was released in 2007. Rosenberg wrote the majority of the album's tracks, with the exception of "Four Horses", which was written by Phillips. The band broke up in 2009.

After the break-up of Passenger, Rosenberg kept the stage-name Passenger and took to busking for a solo music career. His debut solo album, Wide Eyes Blind Love, was released in November 2009. The follow-up album, Flight of the Crow, was recorded in Australia and saw him joined in the studio by various Australian independent musical talents including Lior, Kate Miller-Heidke, Boy & Bear, Josh Pyke and Katie Noonan. In addition, he produced a fans-only limited release, Divers and Submarines.

On his next album, recorded at Sydney's Linear Recording, Rosenberg was joined once again by a core Australian band that included Boy & Bear drummer Tim Hart, jazz bassist Cameron Undy, and keyboards player Stu Hunter, from Katie Noonan & The Captains. All the Little Lights was released in summer of 2012 in North America on Nettwerk Records.

On 26 March 2014 Passenger announced that his fifth studio album, Whispers, would be released on 9 June 2014. Talking to Digital Spy about the album, he said, "This is easily the most 'up' album I've ever made, it's quite cinematic. There are lots of big stories and big ideas. There are also some sombre moments about loneliness and death but hey, it wouldn't be a Passenger album without those." He released "Scare Away the Dark" and "Heart's on Fire" as the lead singles from the album on 14 April 2014.

== Albums ==
=== Studio albums ===
Title	Details	Peak chart positions												Certifications
Title	Details	UK	AUS	AUT	BEL	DEN	GER	IRL	ITA	NL	NZ	SWI	US	Certifications
Wide Eyes Blind Love	Released: 20 November 2009; Label: Passenger; Formats: CD, digital download	—	—	—	—	—	—	—	—	—	—	—	—	
Divers and Submarines	Released: 30 June 2010; Label: Passenger; Formats: CD, digital download	—	—	—	—	—	—	—	—	—	—	—	—	
Flight of the Crow	Released: 24 September 2010; Labels: Passenger, Inertia; Formats: CD, digital download	—	—	—	—	—	—	—	—	—	—	—	—	ARIA: Gold
All the Little Lights	Released: 24 February 2012; Label: Black Crow; Formats: CD, vinyl, digital download	3	2	6	7	9	6	2	30	3	9	5	26	BPI: Platinum; ARIA: 2× Platinum; BVMI: Platinum; IFPI SWI: Gold; MC: Gold; RIAA: Platinum
Whispers	Released: 9 June 2014; Label: Black Crow; Formats: CD, vinyl, digital download	5	2	12	8	20	6	6	39	3	3	5	12	BPI: Gold; ARIA: Gold
Whispers II	Released: 20 April 2015; Label: Black Crow; Formats: CD, vinyl, digital download	12	17	—	86	—	—	49	—	63	30	—	—	
Young as the Morning Old as the Sea	Released: 23 September 2016; Label: Black Crow; Formats: CD, vinyl, digital download	1	1	8	7	—	6	5	31	7	1	1	70	BPI: Silver
The Boy Who Cried Wolf	Released: 28 July 2017; Label: Black Crow; Formats: CD, vinyl, digital download	5	6	—	70	—	—	30	—	16	18	12	—	
Runaway	Released: 31 August 2018; Label: Black Crow; Formats: CD, vinyl, digital download	6	7	29	11	—	15	17	—	9	22	4	—	
Sometimes It's Something, Sometimes It's Nothing at All	Released: 3 May 2019; Label: Black Crow; Formats: CD, vinyl, digital download	—	— (Note: Sometimes It's Something, Sometimes It's Nothing at All did not enter the ARIA Albums Chart, but peaked at number eight on the ARIA Digital Album Chart.)	—	—	—	—	—	—	—	—	31	—	
Patchwork	Released: 10 July 2020; Label: Black Crow; Formats: Vinyl, digital download	—	—	—	—	—	—	—	—	—	—	80	—	
Songs for the Drunk and Broken Hearted	Released: 8 January 2021; Label: Black Crow; Formats: CD, vinyl, digital download, streaming	2	6	—	28	—	6	—	—	18	33	2	—	
Birds That Flew and Ships That Sailed	Released: 8 April 2022; Label: Black Crow; Formats: Digital download, CD, vinyl, streaming	35	—	—	—	—	—	—	—	—	—	97	—	
Wild Love	Released: 6 November 2026; Label: Black Crow; Formats: Digital download, CD, streaming	27	—	—	—	—	—	—	—	—	—	26	—	
"—" denotes a recording that did not chart or was not released in that territory.

=== Covers album ===
Title	Details
Sunday Night Sessions	Released: 2 July 2017; Label: Black Crow; Formats: digital download

== Singles ==
=== As lead artist ===
Title	Year	Peak chart positions												Certifications	Album
Title	Year	UK	AUS	AUT	BEL	DEN	GER	IRL	ITA	NL	NZ	SWI	US	Certifications	Album
"The Wrong Direction"	2012	—	—	—	— (Note: "The Wrong Direction" did not enter the official Flemish Ultratop chart, but rather peaked at number 41 on the Ultratip chart, an extension to the main chart.)	—	—	—	—	28	—	—	—		All the Little Lights
"Let Her Go"	2012	2	1	1	1	1	1	1	1	1	1	1	5	BPI: 7× Platinum; ARIA: 7× Platinum; BEA: 2× Platinum; BVMI: Platinum; FIMI: 6× Platinum; IFPI SWE: 5× Platinum; IFPI SWI: Platinum; MC: Diamond; RIAA: 6× Platinum; RMNZ: 9× Platinum	All the Little Lights
"Holes"	2013	92	20	23	— (Note: "Holes" did not enter the official Flemish Ultratop chart, but rather peaked at number 12 on the Ultratip chart, an extension to the main chart.)	—	48	18	—	34	—	70	—	ARIA: Gold	All the Little Lights
"Scare Away the Dark"	2014	—	—	—	—	—	—	—	—	—	—	—	—		Whispers
"Heart's on Fire"	2014	63	26	—	— (Note: "Heart's on Fire" did not enter the official Flemish Ultratop chart, but rather peaked at number 3 on the Ultratip chart, an extension to the main chart.)	—	100	58	—	—	—	—	—	MC: Gold	Whispers
"Whispers"^{[A]}	2014	70	—	—	—	—	—	—	—	—	17	—	—		Whispers
"Somebody's Love"	2016	—	—	—	— (Note: "Somebody's Love" did not enter the official Flemish Ultratop chart, but rather peaked at number 6 on the Ultratip chart, an extension to the main chart.)	—	—	—	—	—	—	—	—		Young as the Morning Old as the Sea
"Anywhere"	2016	—	43	—	—	—	—	—	—	—	— (Note: "Anywhere" did not enter the NZ Top 40 Singles Chart, but peaked at number 6 on the NZ Heatseeker Singles Chart.)	—	—	FIMI: Gold	Young as the Morning Old as the Sea
"Simple Song"	2017	—	—	—	—	—	—	—	—	—	— (Note: "Simple Song" did not enter the NZ Top 40 Singles Chart, but peaked at number 9 on the NZ Heatseeker Singles Chart.)	—	—		The Boy Who Cried Wolf
"The Boy Who Cried Wolf"	2017	—	—	—	—	—	—	—	—	—	—	—	—		The Boy Who Cried Wolf
"Hell or High Water"	2018	—	—	—	—	—	—	—	—	—	—	—	—		Runaway
"Why Can't I Change"	2018	—	—	—	—	—	—	—	—	—	—	—	—		Runaway
"Runaway"	2018	—	—	—	—	—	—	—	—	—	—	—	—		Runaway
"Heart to Love"	2018	—	—	—	—	—	—	—	—	—	—	—	—		Runaway
"Survivors"	2018	—	—	—	—	—	—	—	—	—	—	54	—		Runaway
"The Way That I Love You"	2020	—	—	—	—	—	—	—	—	—	—	—	—		Songs for the Drunk and Broken Hearted
"London in the Spring"	2020	—	—	—	—	—	—	—	—	—	—	—	—		Songs for the Drunk and Broken Hearted
"A Song for the Drunk and Broken Hearted"	2020	—	—	—	—	—	—	—	—	—	—	—	—		Songs for the Drunk and Broken Hearted
"Suzanne"	2020	—	—	—	—	—	—	—	—	—	—	—	—		Songs for the Drunk and Broken Hearted
"Remember to Forget"	2020	—	—	—	—	—	—	—	—	—	—	—	—		Songs for the Drunk and Broken Hearted
"Sword from the Stone"	2021	— (Note: "Sword from the Stone" did not enter the UK Singles Chart, but peaked at number 30 on the UK Singles Downloads Chart.)	—	—	—	—	—	—	—	—	— (Note: "Sword from the Stone" did not enter the NZ Top 40 Singles Chart, but peaked at number 11 on the NZ Hot Singles Chart.)	70	—	MC: Gold	Songs for the Drunk and Broken Hearted
"Life's for Living" (anniversary edition) (with Foy Vance)	2023	—	—	—	—	—	—	—	—	—	—	—	—		
"Circles" (anniversary edition) (with Gabrielle Aplin)	2023	—	—	—	—	—	—	—	—	—	—	—	—		
"Song for the Countryside"	2025	—	—	—	—	—	—	—	—	—	—	—	—		Keep On Walking Mr Fry
"The Road is Long"	2025	—	—	—	—	—	—	—	—	—	—	—	—		Keep On Walking Mr Fry
"It Was Gonna Be You"	2026	—	—	—	—	—	—	—	—	—	—	—	—		Wild Love
"Boomerang"	2026	—	—	—	—	—	—	—	—	—	—	—	—		Wild Love
"Ghost"	2026	—	—	—	—	—	—	—	—	—	—	—	—		Wild Love
"—" denotes a recording that did not chart or was not released in that territory.

=== Promotional singles ===
Title	Year	Album
"A Kindly Reminder"	2017	Non-album singles
"Beautiful Birds" (Instrumental)	2017	Non-album singles

== Other charted songs ==
Title	Year	Peak chart positions	Album
Title	Year	NZ Heat.	Album
"Young as the Morning Old as the Sea"	2016	4	Young as the Morning Old as the Sea

== Music videos ==
Title	Year	Associated Album
"Wicked Man's Rest"	2007	Wicked Man's Rest
"Walk You Home" (Better known as "Night Vision Binoculars")†	2007	Wicked Man's Rest
"Do What You Like"	2007	Wicked Man's Rest
"Table for One"	2008	Wicked Man's Rest
"Saturday Night TV"	2008	
"The Last Unicorn"	2009	Wide Eyes Blind Love
"What Will Become of Us"	2009	Wide Eyes Blind Love
"I See Love"	2009	Wide Eyes Blind Love
"Rainbows"	2009	Wide Eyes Blind Love
"Caravan"	2009	Wide Eyes Blind Love
"Wide Eyes"	2009	Wide Eyes Blind Love
"Starlings"	2009	Wide Eyes Blind Love
"Blind Love"	2009	Wide Eyes Blind Love
"Snowflake"	2009	Wide Eyes Blind Love
"Divers and Submarines"	2010	Divers and Submarines
"Crows In Snow"	2010	Divers and Submarines
"Golden Thread" feat. Matt Corby	2010	Flight of the Crow
"The Girl Running" feat. Jess Chalker	2010	Flight of the Crow
"What You're Thinking" feat. Josh Pyke	2010	Flight of the Crow
"Rivers" feat. Lior	2011	Flight of the Crow
"The Wrong Direction"	2012	All the Little Lights
"Keep on Walking"	2012	All the Little Lights
"Let Her Go"	2012	All the Little Lights
"Life's for the Living"	2012	All the Little Lights
"Things That Stop You Dreaming"	2012	All the Little Lights
"A Thousand Matches"	2013	
"I'll Be Your Man"	2013	
"Golden Leaves"	2013	
"The Way That I Need You"	2013	
"Holes"	2013	
"All the Little Lights"	2013	
"Scare Away the Dark"	2014	
"Heart's On Fire	2014	
"Whispers"	2014	
"27"	2014	
"Travelling Alone"	2015	
"David"	2015	
"Fear of Fear"	2015	
"Somebody's Love"	2016	
"Anywhere"	2016	
"When We Were Young"	2017	
"Everything"	2017	
"Let Me Dream a While"	2017	
"Someday"	2017	
"If You Go"	2017	
"Beautiful Birds" feat. BIRDY	2017	
"The Boy Who Cried Wolf"	2017	
"Simple Song"	2017	
"Thunder and Lightning/Lanterns"	2018	
"Hell Or High Water"	2018	
"Why Can't I Change"	2018	
"Runaway"	2018	
"Heart To Love"	2018	
"To Be Free"	2018	
"Survivors"	2018	
"Ghost Town"	2018	
"Eagle Bear Buffalo"	2018	
"He Leaves You Cold"	2018	
"Let's Go"	2019	
"New Until It's Old"	2019	
"Restless Wind"	2019	
"Helplessly Lost"	2019	
"Paper Cut, Chinese Burn"	2019	
"Sometimes It's Something, Sometimes It's Nothing At All"	2019	
"Rosie"	2019	
"Where The Lights Hang Low"	2019	
"Winter Coats"	2020	
"Sandstorm (Acoustic)"	2020	
"The Way That I Love You"	2020	
"Patchwork - The Album"	2020	
"A Song For The Drunk And Broken Hearted"	2020	

†- refers to a song whose music video is no longer officially uploaded.
