= Peter Marin =

- Born: Peter Robert Stuart Marin; 4 November 1978 (age 47); Perth, Western Australia
- Genres: Progressive rock; heavy rock
- Occupation: Musician
- Instruments: Drums; percussion; samples; vocals
- Years active: 1995–present
- Website: petermarin.com.au

Peter Robert Stuart Marin (born 4 November 1978 in Perth) is an Australian drummer and percussionist. Marin joined Dan Sultan's backing band in 2006 and is recorded on Sultan's albums, Get Out While You Can (November 2009), Blackbird (April 2014) and Killer (July 2017). He provided drums and percussion on United Kingdom artist Passenger's albums Whispers (June 2014), Whispers II (April 2015), Young as the Morning, Old as the Sea (September 2016), Runaway (August 2018) and Songs for the Drunk and Broken Hearted (January 2021). In 2023, Marin joined Australian rock band Jet as their new drummer for the band's reunion tour, marking the 20th anniversary of their debut album Get Born.

== Biography ==
Peter Stuart Robert Marin (born 4 November 1978, Perth, Western Australia) is an Australian drummer and percussionist. From the age of six, he was raised in Essex, England before returning to Perth, aged 14. His father was a musician in a local covers band, and his mother was a nurse. Marin started a jazz course at UWA Conservatorium of Music but left to focus on his rock music career. He played in his father's covers band before relocating to Melbourne.

Marin formed Template, a progressive rock trio, in Melbourne in August 2001, with Michael Mills on guitar and vocals and Jarrod Ross on bass guitar. They issued their self-titled debut album in 2003. Its track, "Holly Wouldn't", co-written by Marin, was broadcast on national radio, Triple J.

Marin joined Dan Sultan's backing band in 2006 and is recorded on that artist's albums, Get Out While You Can (November 2009), Blackbird (April 2014) and Killer (July 2017). Marin joined Rogue Traders in 2008 and appeared on their album, Night of the Living Drums (November 2011). He provided drums and percussion on United Kingdom artist, Passenger's albums, Whispers (June 2014), Whispers II (April 2015), Young as the Morning, Old as the Sea (September 2016), Runaway (August 2018) and Songs for the Drunk and Broken Hearted (January 2021).

In 2019, Marin collaborated with Jet members Cameron Muncey and Mark Wilson on recording sessions for Muncey's debut solo project, Cam Muncey & the Delusions of Grandeur. In 2023, he was invited to join Jet as their new drummer for the band's reunion tour marking the 20th anniversary of their debut album, Get Born. In 2024, Marin played drums on "Un’Aventura", the B-side to Jet's comeback single "Hurry Hurry".

== Additional credits ==
Marin has also performed and recorded with the following acts:

- Gossling – If You Can Whistle (EP, 2009), Until Then (EP, 2010), International Living (EP, 2012), Harvest of Gold (2013)
- Stu Larsen – "Vagabond" (2014)
- Ross Hannaford (ex-Daddy Cool)
- Ross Wilson (ex-Daddy Cool)
- Bertie Blackman
- Renee Geyer
- Ed Sheeran
