= The Once =

Canadian band

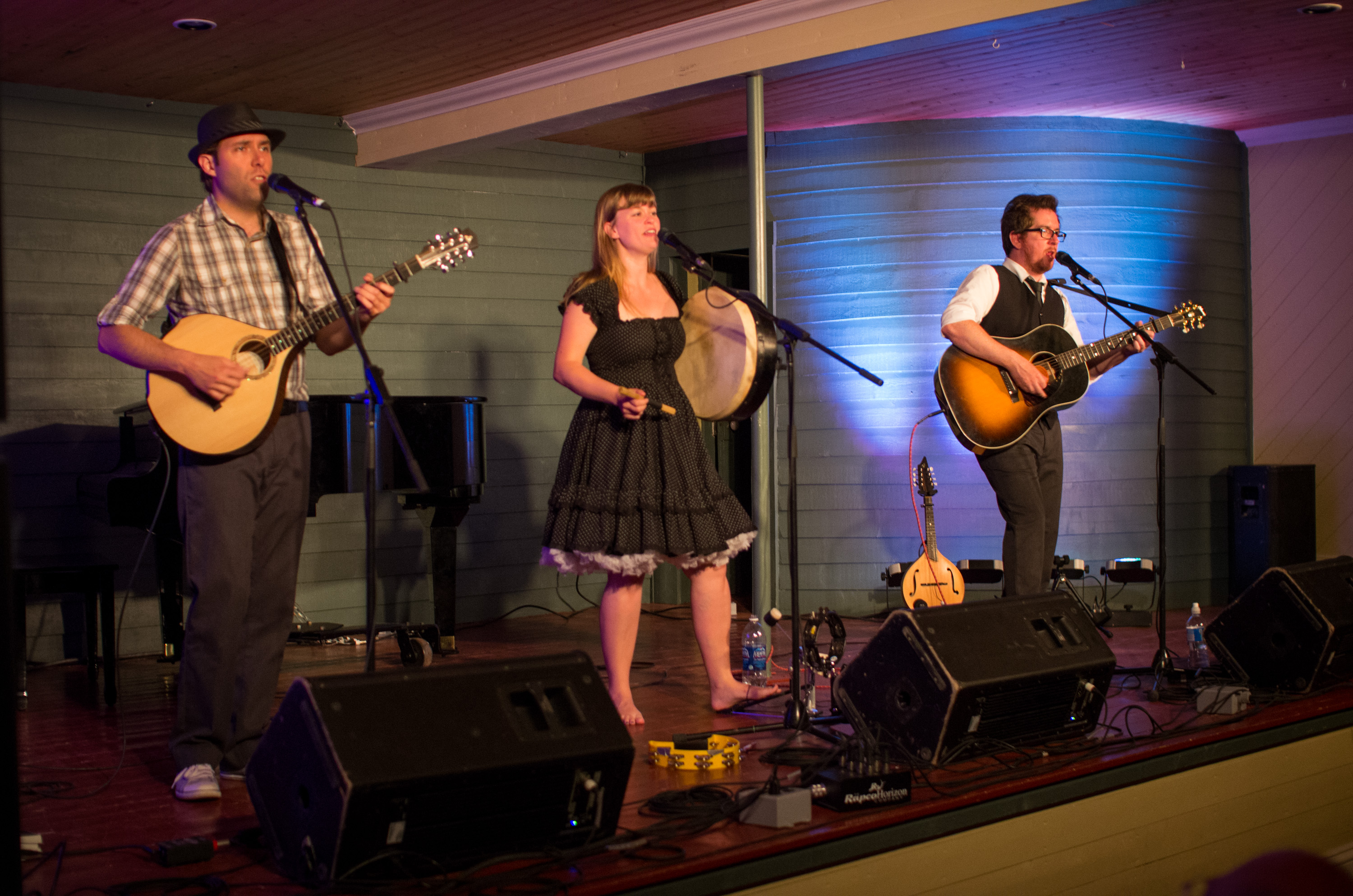
- The Once performing at Woody Point in 2012

Background information
- Origin: St. John's, Newfoundland, Canada
- Genres: Folk music
- Years active: 2004–present
- Label: Borealis
- Members: Geraldine Hollett; Phil Churchill; Andrew Dale
- Website: theonce.ca

The Once is a folk trio based in St. John's, Newfoundland, Canada. The group features Geraldine Hollett on lead vocals and vocalist-instrumentalists Phil Churchill and Andrew Dale playing a variety of instruments. The group performs a mix of original and traditional material and is noted for their three part harmonies, which are sometimes performed a cappella.

The Once's name comes from an old Newfoundland expression which means "as soon as possible", "right away", "directly", or "in a short while".

== History ==
The members of The Once met while taking part in a summer repertory theatre company in Trinity, Newfoundland. In August 2009, they released an eponymous album on Borealis Records. In 2014, the group went on Passenger's Whispers Tour through the US, Canada, Europe, and Australia. The group also supported Passenger on his 2016 album, Young as the Morning Old as the Sea, and his 2018 album, Runaway.

== Awards ==
- 2009 Atlantis Music Prize (nominated for The Once)
- 2010 Canadian Folk Music Awards (won Traditional Album of the Year for The Once and New/Emerging Artist of the Year)
- 2011 East Coast Music Award (nominated for Group Recording of the Year for The Once)
- 2012 Juno Nomination Row Upon Row
- 2015 Juno Nomination Departures

== Discography ==
- 2009 - The Once
- 2011 - Row Upon Row of the People They Know
- 2012 - This Is a Christmas Album
- 2014 - Departures
- 2016 - We Win Some We Lose (EP)
- 2018 - Time Enough
- 2022 - Acoustic Vol. 1ce
- 2024 - Out Here
- 2025 - Fallen Tree (Side B) (EP)
