= The Unlikely Pilgrimage of Harold Fry (film) =

2023 British film

- Theatrical release poster
- Directed by: Hettie Macdonald
- Written by: Rachel Joyce
- Based on: The Unlikely Pilgrimage of Harold Fry by Rachel Joyce
- Produced by: Kevin Loader; Juliet Dowling; Marilyn Milgrom
- Starring: Jim Broadbent; Penelope Wilton; Joseph Mydell
- Cinematography: Kate McCullough
- Edited by: Jon Harris; Napolean Stratogiannakis
- Production companies: Ingenious Media; Embankment Films
- Distributed by: Entertainment One
- Release date: 28 April 2023
- Running time: 108 minutes
- Country: United Kingdom
- Language: English

The Unlikely Pilgrimage of Harold Fry is a 2023 British drama film directed by Hettie Macdonald. It is based on the 2012 novel of the same name by Rachel Joyce. The film stars Jim Broadbent and Penelope Wilton.

The Unlikely Pilgrimage of Harold Fry was released in the United Kingdom on 28 April 2023, by eOne. It was the last film to be distributed by Entertainment One in the United Kingdom before the distributor's UK division was shut down on 20 July 2023.

== Plot ==
Pensioner Harold Fry lives in Kingsbridge in south Devon with his wife Maureen, leading a humdrum life. Hearing that a former colleague, Queenie Hennessy, is dying from cancer in a hospice in Berwick-upon-Tweed, he writes her a letter, but feels that his words are an unworthy gesture. Too ashamed to post the letter, he puts the decision off by visiting a garage shop, where the attendant tells him her own encouragement helped her aunt fight cancer. He calls the hospice and asks them to tell Queenie that he intends to walk to Berwick - some 500 miles - and she must hold onto her life until he arrives.

Realising Harold is not returning, Maureen is at first worried; when he finally calls to inform her of his plan she reacts angrily. Eventually she reveals to a neighbour that, following several years of rocky relationship, she fears he has taken the opportunity to finally walk out on their marriage - something she admits she has almost done on several occasions.

After several days of walking, Harold begins to experience hallucinations of his son, David, with whom he had a tempestuous relationship. He collapses in the street, and is taken in by Martina, a Slovakian doctor who emigrated to the UK but is unable to find any other work than cleaning. She treats his feet, which are now blistered, and lets him recuperate in her house for several days. She reveals that her partner left her for another woman a year ago, and she still waits for him to return. Still, through their conversation Harold's refusal to give in to bad circumstances humbles her and she insists on giving him several items of walking kit left behind by her former partner.

Harold's journey continues over weeks; he meets more strangers, leaving them touched by his selfless spirit. In a pub, a journalist posing as a patron takes his picture and he rapidly becomes an unwitting national hero. Shortly after this, Harold is joined by Wilf, an eighteen-year-old drug addict inspired by his story, who wants to walk for Queenie too. As more media outlets relay his story, dozens more individuals join him and they call themselves 'Pilgrims'. Harold struggles to understand their fascination with him. Maureen and Rex travel to visit Harold, and she asks forgiveness for trying to stop his walk. Harold says he is the one who need forgiveness. He invites Maureen to join his pilgrimage but she says she hasn't got her things with her.

The camp continues to grow and fosters a genuine camaraderie, but delays progress towards Berwick. Harold's memories of his son continue, and when Wilf flees the camp after being caught carrying pills, Harold recalls David's own descent into drug abuse. He tells another Pilgrim how he watched his son deteriorate before he hanged himself. The Pilgrim helps Harold accept that he needs to leave the camp behind to reach his destination, saying they only travelled one mile in the last day.

Alone, Harold's mental state declines and he breaks down in a cafe after they refuse him a comb and a razor. He phones Maureen from a callbox to tell her that he has no idea where he is and wants to come home. Maureen gets him to ask someone where he is and then informs him that he is only 18 miles from Berwick. She tells him she never passed on Queenie's final message to him some 25 years earlier. At that time, believing that he was to blame for David's death, Harold had turned to drink and had determined to engineer ways of punishing himself further. He visited his place of work at night and destroyed stock, intending to get fired. Instead, Queenie had taken the blame, being dismissed in his place and allowing him to rebuild his life. Some time later she had driven to Harold and Maureen's house while he was out to tell him that she was moving away and to tell him not to blame himself. Maureen, feeling spiteful for the way that he was receiving comfort where she had received none, and perhaps suspecting an affair, had refused to pass on the message.

Shortly afterwards, Harold reaches Berwick. Once he summons the nerve to enter the hospice, he is enthusiastically greeted by the nun he has spoken to on the phone. She leads him to Queenie but warns him that she cannot speak. Harold finds himself unable to say much to her, but hangs up a quartz pendant, that he bought for her at start of his journey, in her window. Later the sunlight is refracted and rainbows speckled the ceiling.

Meeting Maureen again in Berwick, Harold confesses defeat, implying that Queenie did not live long after his arrival and telling Maureen that he doesn't understand how he thought that he could save her when he could not save David. She responds by telling him that his devotion to Queenie has helped her remember the man she used to love and that his actions have saved their marriage. Meanwhile, the various people who Harold and his story touched along the pilgrimage are shown looking at light reflected into colours, and smiling.

== Cast ==
- Jim Broadbent as Harold Fry
  - Adam Jackson-Smith as young Harold Fry
- Penelope Wilton as Maureen Fry
  - Bethan Cullinane as young Maureen Fry
- Linda Bassett as Queenie Hennessy
- Joseph Mydell as Rex
- Earl Cave as David Fry
- Monika Gossmann as Martina
- Maanuv Thiara as Mick
- Nina Singh as Garage Girl
- Daniel Frogson as Wilf
- Naomi Wirthner as Kate
- Claire Rushbrook as Farmer's wife
- Ian Porter as Jim the Oncologist
- Joy Richardson as Sister Philomena
- Sam Lee as Singer

== Production ==
The project was directed by Hettie Macdonald, with Kate McCullough as director of photography, production design by Christina Moore, and costume design by Sarah Blenkinsop. The film was produced by Kevin Loader, Juliet Dowling and Marilyn Milgrom, and was developed with Film4 and the BFI; financing was arranged by Embankment Films and provided by the BFI and Ingenious. It was the biggest investment made in new film by the BFI in 2021. Julian Broad worked on the film as a lighting technician.

=== Casting ===
Broadbent joined the project to play Harold in February 2021. Broadbent had previously also voiced the audiobook. He also previously worked with the author of the book when she worked as an actress; Joyce had played Perdita to his Leontes in a production of The Winter's Tale at the Crucible Theatre in Sheffield in 1987. Penelope Wilton joined the project in June 2021.

=== Filming ===
Filming took place mainly on location to match Harold's walk in the story. Filming began in Devon in September 2021. Devon filming locations included Kingsbridge, Loddiswell, South Brent, Higher Dean, Buckfast, Exeter, Tiverton and Appledore. Filming also took place in Bath, Somerset, and Gloucestershire, Ripley, Derbyshire as well as on the border between Wakefield and Dewsbury, and Sheffield, Yorkshire. Other locations include Darlington, Harrogate, South Stainey, Skipton-On-Swale, and Northallerton.

=== Soundtrack ===
A soundtrack featuring music and original songs from the film was released featuring two original songs written and performed by Sam Lee.

== Release ==
The Unlikely Pilgrimage of Harold Fry was released in the United Kingdom on 28 April 2023, by eOne. It was the last film to be distributed by Entertainment One in the United Kingdom before the distributor's UK division was shut down on 20 July 2023.

== Reception ==
=== Critical response ===
On the review aggregator website Rotten Tomatoes, The Unlikely Pilgrimage of Harold Fry holds an approval rating of 83% based on 29 critic reviews, with an average rating of 6.4/10. The website's critics consensus reads: "If The Unlikely Pilgrimage of Harold Fry follows a well-worn path, having Jim Broadbent and Penelope Wilton as guides makes it difficult to complain."

Deborah Ross for The Spectator described it as an "incredibly beautiful film to look at" and that "Broadbent is a wonder, so real and sincere it doesn't feel like acting...and Wilton equals him". Ross concluded that "this may even be one of those rare instances where the film is better than the book". Kevin Maher in The Times described it as "immediately one of the great movies about ageing and regret" with director Macdonald a "secret weapon" whose "return to cinema is something to be celebrated". Peter Bradshaw in The Guardian was more critical of the suspension of reality required with the plot, saying that whilst it was "impeccably acted, sincerely intended and often beautifully shot" there was something "unsatisfying" in the "solemn, self-conscious fantasy".
