= Runaway Tour =

Runaway Tour may refer to:

- Runaway Tour (Passenger), 2018
- Runaway Tour (Post Malone), 2019
- Runaway Tour, by Bon Jovi, 1983–1984
