= The Unlikely Pilgrimage of Harold Fry (musical) =

2025 musical

- Original World Premiere production poster
- Music: Passenger
- Lyrics: Passenger
- Book: Rachel Joyce
- Basis: Novel The Unlikely Pilgrimage of Harold Fry by Rachel Joyce
- Premiere: 5 May 2025: Minerva Theatre, Chichester
- Productions: 2025 Chichester; 2026 West End

The Unlikely Pilgrimage of Harold Fry is a musical with music and lyrics by Passenger and a book by Rachel Joyce based on her 2012 novel of the same name.

== Production history ==
=== Chichester (2025) ===
The musical received its world premiere as part of the 2025 season at the Chichester Festival Theatre. The production ran from 5 May to 14 June 2025. It was directed by Katy Rudd, choreographed by Tom Jackson Greaves, and designed by Samuel Wyer. The cast included Mark Addy as Harold Fry and Jenna Russell as Maureen Fry. Full casting was announced on 14 March 2025.

On the announcement of the musical, Passenger released a music video performing a song from the musical, "Keep On Walking Mr Fry"

=== West End (2026) ===
The show transferred to London's West End in January 2026. The show began performances on 29 January 2026 at the Theatre Royal Haymarket, and ended on 18 April. Mark Addy and Jenna Russell reprise their performances from Chichester. The Balladeer is played by Noah Mullins, who is making their West End debut.

== Cast and characters ==
| Character | Chichester | West End |
| Character | 2025 | 2026 |
|---|---|---|
| Harold Fry | Mark Addy | Mark Addy |
| Maureen Fry | Jenna Russell | Jenna Russell |
| The Balladeer / David Fry | Jack Wolfe | Noah Mullins |
| Rich | —N/a | Craig Armstrong |
| Fairy Assistant | —N/a | Maggie Service |
| Queenie Hennessy | Amy Booth-Steel | Maggie Service |
| Farmer's Wife | Amy Booth-Steel | Jenna Boyd |
| Sister Philomena | Madeleine Worrall | Jenna Boyd |
| Martina | Madeleine Worrall | Madeleine Worrall |
| Wilf/Jim | Tarinn Callender | Ashley Samuels |
| Silver-Haired Gentleman / Mr Napier | Don Gallagher | Daniel Crossley |
| Kate | Sharon Rose | Gleanne Purcell-Brown |
| Young Maureen | —N/a | Nell Martin |
| Dog (puppeteer) / Young Harold | —N/a | Timo Tatzber |
| Garage Girl | —N/a | Nicole Nyarambi |
| Rex | —N/a | Peter Polycarpou |

== Musical numbers ==
Act I

- "Rise Up" – Balladeer & Ensemble
- "Walk Upon the Water" – Garage Girl & Ensemble
- "Song for the Countryside" – Balladeer & Ensemble
- "The Art of Getting Lost" (Note: Originally titled "Such is Life", retitled to "The Art of Getting Lost" for the West End production and the cast recording.) – Farmer's Wife
- "From the Rooftops" – Silver-Haired Gentlemen
- "Tin of Soup for One" – Maureen
- "You're Fucked" (Note: Listed as "Out of Luck" in the programme of the West End production.) – Martina
- "Keep On Walking Mr Fry" – Sister Philomena
- "The Pilgrim's Tale" – Balladeer & Ensemble

Act II

- "My Hero, Harold Fry" – Wilf
- "Such A Simple Thing" – Maureen & Ensemble
- "One Foot in Front of the Other" – Kate, Balladeer & Ensemble
- "Dear Girl in the Garage" – Harold
- "Here's One for the Road" – Balladeer & Ensemble

=== Recordings ===
On 10 September 2025, Passenger released a concept album, One for the Road, with Black Crow Records. It features 10 tracks, including "Song for the Countryside" featuring Jack Wolfe and "Walk Upon the Water" featuring The Kingdom Choir.

On 26 June 2026, a cast recording was released with Decca Records. It features all 14 songs from the musical, performed by the original West End cast.

== Plot ==
=== Act I ===
The Balladeer opens by singing a song introducing the main character, Harold Fry ("Rise Up"). Harold receives a letter in the mail from an old friend named Queenie saying that she is in hospice. He decides to write her a letter and sets out to mail it but walks by several post boxes and the post office before ending up at a garage. The garage employee inspires Harold to walk from where he is to where Queenie is in hospice, from South Devon to Berwick-upon-Tweed, to inspire her to keep living (“Walk Upon the Water”). Harold calls the hospice to tell Queenie of his plan and sets out on his journey (“Song for the Countryside”). Harold also calls his wife, Maureen, to tell her of his plan. Maureen is confused and unhappy, but Harold continues on. He can only call from phone boxes and send postcards because he left his phone behind.

Along his path, Harold meets several people who help him and allow him to contextualize his life and struggles, including a farmer’s wife with no children (“The Art of Getting Lost”), an older man at a diner who wants to come out as gay (“From the Rooftops”), and a woman whose husband left her and is unable to use her medical degree as an immigrant (“You’re Fucked”). He also has flashbacks to when he and Queenie worked together. At home, Maureen reflects about how her life has been dull for a while and now she’s alone (“Tin of Soup for One”).

Harold runs into some tourists who find his story inspiring and post photos of him on Instagram. He calls the hospice who tell him that Queenie miraculously seems to be doing better with the knowledge of Harold’s walk and his postcards, and they tell him to keep going (“Keep On Walking Mr. Fry”). Harold becomes a viral sensation from the Instagram post and a group of people join him on his walk, calling themselves pilgrims, starting with Wilf (“The Pilgrim’s Tale”). Harold tells the news how he’s glad that so many people are positively affected by his journey. The Balladeer becomes angry and reveals himself to a startled Harold, who yells out the name David.

=== Act II ===
Wilf sings the praises of Harold as the pilgrims celebrate (“My Hero Harold Fry”). Harold flashes back to fighting with his son while David was at Cambridge. Harold begins to feel the pressure of so many people relying on him and slowing down his journey. Maureen reflects on when she and Harold met at a dance and how happy they were when they were young (“Such a Simple Thing”). Harold freaks out at Wilf, believing he’s trying to steal something. Harold decides to set out on his own, leaving the other pilgrims behind (“One Foot in Front of the Other”).

As a storm comes on, Harold spirals and is haunted by an apparition of David who blames him for not listening to or supporting him as David struggled with high expectations and his mental health. Distraught, he calls Maureen who encourages him to finish his journey. Harold staggers into a diner, babbling incoherently about his son and sobbing. He writes a postcard to the girl in the garage, telling her that his son committed suicide many years ago (“Dear Girl in the Garage”). After that, his marriage fell apart and he turned to alcohol. He ended up drunkenly vandalizing his workplace, which Queenie took the blame for and got fired, and he’s guilty that he never got to thank her. The girl brings the postcard to Maureen to help her understand Harold’s reasons and encourage her to go to Harold.

Harold arrives at the hospice. Queenie is unresponsive but she can still hear. Harold struggles to find the words to say at first, but is finally able to thank her. Afterward, he sits on a bench on a nearby beach and reflects on his long journey. Maureen joins him and the two reconcile their history and remember the joy of their youth (“Here’s One for the Road”).

== Awards and nominations ==
| Year | Award | Category | Nominee | Result |
|---|---|---|---|---|
| 2026 | Laurence Olivier Awards | Best New Musical | Rachel Joyce (book), Passenger (music & lyrics) | Nominated |
| 2026 | Laurence Olivier Awards | Best Actress in a Musical | Jenna Russell | Nominated |
