= Somebody's Love =

Single by Passenger

from the album Young as the Morning, Old as the Sea
- Released: 17 June 2016
- Recorded: 2015
- Genre: Folk; pop
- Length: 3:45
- Label: Black Crow Records
- Songwriter(s): Michael David Rosenberg

Passenger singles chronology
"Whispers" (2014)	"Somebody's Love" (2016)	"Anywhere" (2016)

"Somebody's Love" is a song by English singer-songwriter Passenger. The song was released as a digital download on 17 June 2016 in the United Kingdom, as the lead single from his seventh studio album, Young as the Morning, Old as the Sea (2016).

== Music video ==
A music video to accompany the release of "Somebody's Love" was first released onto YouTube on 16 June 2016 at a total length of three minutes and fifty-one seconds.

== Track listing ==
Digital download
No.	Title	Length
1.	"Somebody's Love"	3:45

== Chart performance ==
=== Weekly charts ===
Chart (2016)	Peak position
Belgium (Ultratip Bubbling Under Flanders)	6
Belgium (Ultratip Bubbling Under Wallonia)	48
US Adult Alternative Songs (Billboard)	7

== Release history ==
Region	Date	Format	Label
United Kingdom	17 June 2016	Digital download	Black Crow Records
