= The Unlikely Pilgrimage of Harold Fry =

2012 novel by Rachel Joyce

First UK edition (publ. Doubleday)

The Unlikely Pilgrimage of Harold Fry is a novel by Rachel Joyce, published in 2012. Joyce's first novel, it was longlisted for the 2012 Man Booker Prize, and Joyce won the UK National Book Award for New Writer of the Year for the book. It was also the best-selling hardback book in the UK from a new novelist in 2012.

A film adaptation of the same name starring Jim Broadbent and Penelope Wilton was released in the UK on 28 April 2023.

== Plot summary ==
Harold Fry, 65, has cut the lawn outside his home at Kingsbridge on the south coast of Devon when he receives a letter. A colleague of twenty years ago, Queenie Hennessy, has cancer and is in a hospice in Berwick-upon-Tweed. The doctors say there is nothing more that can be done for her. He writes her a feeble and brief note and goes to post it, has second thoughts, and walks to the next post box, and the next. He phones the hospice from a call box and leaves a message. He is coming and she should wait, stay alive while he makes the journey. He tells the shop assistant about his journey and she says she had a relative who had cancer and that faith makes a difference. She denies that she means this in a religious way.

Harold continues to walk and reflects on his marriage, his son David, and his work life. He also remembers his childhood.

Maureen, Harold's wife, is cross at his departure without a word, and then anxious. Eventually she drives up to see him. She tells him, "it was selfish of me to ask you to give up your walk. Forgive me, Harold", to which replies, "I'm the one who needs forgiveness" (232).

Harold also realises that his journey to Queenie Hennessy is also a way for him to resolve issues from his past and to listen to the problems of others, such as a "silver-haired gentleman" whom he meets in a cafe early in his journey, or a middle-aged woman with cuts on her wrists.

He remembers how when he was twelve his mother 'walked out', and is aware that he is repeating her action. When he was sixteen his father 'showed him the door'. Later he went mad.

Six miles south of Stroud he phones the hospice and is told that his walk and message (to wait for him) is working. Patients without family usually die quickly but Queenie has rallied. Harold finds a cast-off sleeping bag and carries it with another bag. Faced with a shrunken bank balance he starts to sleep outside. In Cheltenham he gives away his guidebook and posts home his debit card and other small items.

South of Coventry he is joined by a young man, Mick, who remarks, "What you're doing is a pilgrimage for the twenty-first century. It's awesome. Yours is the kind of story people want to hear" (193). Mick, it appears, works for the Coventry Telegraph, and Harold's story of modern pilgrimage was soon everywhere, including Thought for the Day on BBC Radio 4. Before long they are joined by several others from all walks of life. They do not use paid accommodation, always sleeping out or finding garden sheds.

There are disagreements, thefts, and soon Harold is thinking, "if only these people would go. Would find something else to believe in"(220). He decides to backtrack, which has the effect of throwing off the fellow-travellers who proceed directly to the Berwick destination. In the last stages of his walk Harold becomes badly disorientated, wanders around west of Berwick, sending home postcards from places like Kelso.

But when he at last reaches the hospice where Queenie has been waiting, he decides not to go in, and the reader is told, by means of a confessional letter to the girl at the filling station, of another motive for the walk. His son David, unemployed after Cambridge and addicted to drink and drugs, took his own life in the garden shed, where he was discovered by Harold. The same letter divulges that when he and Queenie were working as colleagues she had taken the blame for a misdemeanour committed by Harold when he lost his temper, partly through grief and wishing to be punished. "I let her take the blame"(264).

Finally, Harold changes his mind and goes to the sick room to find Queenie unable to speak and at the point of death. Maureen reaches him in Berwick, and he tells her that Queenie is beyond hope, beyond speech, and had been so since he set out. He however is able to say things to Maureen that were previously unspoken, about memories of David, of their earlier life, his own mother. They are reconciled before the waves breaking on the beach. Together they visit the hospice where Queenie has died and learned that she died at peace. When a young nun invites them to stay for evening mass they decline. Later, they head to the waterfront and reminisce on how they first met and they laugh for the first time in years.

== Coda ==
'The Love Song of Queenie Hennessy', five 15-minute readings on Radio 4 in October 2014, and repeated March 2016, is a sequence of letters and reminiscences from Queenie. Rachel Joyce imagines Queenie's last days as she waits for Harold. Her love has always been undeclared, and in these recounted memories she is more closely involved with David than with him. David steals and declaims her love poems written for/about Harold, steals money from Queenie, fails at Cambridge. She fears that her turning on him with an accusation drives him to the overdose which finishes him. Maureen rejects her when she comes with flowers on David's death. Harold arrives at the hospice and in this story they talk. She sees in the window the shining quartz pendant he brings, her letters of reminiscence have confessed her lifelong love. The obscure sacking incident is now a rampage, unexplained and unprovoked, where Harold smashes a set of glass clowns given to boss Napier by his mother. An undertaker sees about Queenie's coffin. Her story is her last confession. Now Harold, who has completed his long walk is, pathetically, briefly, all for her. Maureen is not in the picture.

== Background and reception ==
Joyce first wrote the story of Harold Fry in the form of a short radio play, which was broadcast on BBC Radio 4, with Anton Rogers, Anna Massey and Niamh Cusack. She dedicated the play to her father, who was dying from cancer, and who did not live long enough to hear it. The play was later developed into a full-length novel.

According to Matthew Richardson in The Spectator, Joyce manages the "balancing act of embedding homespun philosophy [...] without being twee". Ron Charles in The Washington Post compared Harold Fry's journey to "Walter Mitty skydiving" and "J. Alfred Prufrock not just eating that peach, but throwing the pit out the window, rolling up his trousers and whistling to those hot mermaids". Alfred Hickling, reviewing the novel for The Guardian, wrote that "[u]ltimately, the success of Joyce's writing depends less on the credibility (or otherwise) of what actually happens, so much as her unerring ability to convey profound emotions in simple, unaffected language". Janet Maslin, who reviewed it for The New York Times, called the book "sentimental" with "a premise that is simple and twee", but concludes that "it is very much a story of present-day courage".

== Adaptation ==
There was a 2023 film adaptation starring Jim Broadbent as Harold Fry.

A stage musical premiered at the Minerva Theatre, Chichester in May 2025 with a book by Joyce and songs by Passenger. It starred Mark Addy as Harold Fry and Jenna Russell as Maureen Fry.

== Footnote ==
Rachel Joyce, The Unlikely Pilgrimage of Harold Fry, Doubleday, 2012. Page references in parentheses in the article text are to this edition.
