= Sword from the Stone =

2021 song

Single by Passenger

from the album Songs for the Drunk and Broken Hearted
- Released: 8 January 2021
- Length: 3:21
- Label: Black Crow
- Songwriter: Mike Rosenberg
- Producers: Chris Vallejo; Ed Sheeran; Joe Rubel

Passenger singles chronology
"Remember to Forget" (2020)	"Sword from the Stone" (2021)	"Boomerang" (2026)

"Sword from the Stone" is a song by English singer-songwriter Passenger. The song was released as a digital download on 8 January 2021 by Black Crow as the sixth single from his twelfth studio album, Songs for the Drunk and Broken Hearted. A new version of the song was released on 15 January 2021 titled 'Gingerbread Mix'.

== Background ==
In an interview with the Official Charts Company regarding co-writing the song with Ed Sheeran, Passenger said, "When I wrote this song I sent it to him because I was excited about it. Within about seven minutes he had replied twice and then phoned me to tell me he thought it was something special. The pair decided Ed would create a 'poppier, punchier single mix of the song - something probably more viable for commercial radio. Ed’s so clever and he's got such a brilliant ear for that stuff. I love what he's done – the integrity and the soul of the song is still very much intact – he's just Sheeran-ised it. It's brilliant to be mates with something like that who can help in such a way." In a statement, Passenger said, "Ed was really excited about the song when I played it to him and suggested that he produce a version that could potentially work as a radio single. It's not every day you have that kind of offer from a pop genius, and I'm so delighted with what he and Joe have come up with. It's been such a fun one to work on." He also talked about sharing the song with his friends and family and said, "I genuinely think it's had the best reaction of any song I've ever written."

== Reception ==
The Independent criticized the song's lyrics for "primary school platitudes" such as "up and down like a yo-yo".

== Music video ==
A music video to accompany the release of "Sword from the Stone" was first released onto YouTube on 8 January 2021. The video was directed by Raja Virdi.

== Track listing ==
Digital download
No.	Title	Length
1.	"Sword from the Stone" (Gingerbread Mix)	2:48
2.	"Sword from the Stone"	3:21
3.	"Sword from the Stone" (Acoustic)	3:33

== Personnel ==
Credits adapted from Tidal.

- Chris Vallejo – Producer
- Ed Sheeran – Producer
- Joe Rubel – Producer
- Michael David Rosenberg – Composer, lead vocalist

== Charts ==
Chart (2021)	Peak position
Iceland (Tónlistinn)	22
New Zealand Hot Singles (RMNZ)	11
Switzerland (Schweizer Hitparade)	70
UK Singles Downloads (Official Charts)	30
US Adult Pop Airplay (Billboard)	20
US Adult Alternative Airplay (Billboard)	10

== Certifications ==
Region	Certification	Certified units/sales
Canada (Music Canada)	Gold	40,000^{‡}
^{‡} Sales+streaming figures based on certification alone.
