= Anywhere (Passenger song) =

Single by Passenger

from the album Young as the Morning, Old as the Sea
- Released: 19 August 2016
- Recorded: 2015
- Genre: Folk rock
- Length: 3:36
- Label: Black Crow Records
- Songwriter(s): Michael David Rosenberg

Passenger singles chronology
| "Somebody's Love" (2016) | "Anywhere" (2016) | "Simple Song" (2017) |

"Anywhere" is a song by English singer-songwriter Passenger. It was released as a digital download on 19 August 2016 in the United Kingdom, as the second single from his seventh studio album, Young as the Morning, Old as the Sea (2016).

== Music video ==
The music video of "Anywhere" was first released on YouTube on 19 August 2016.

== Track listing ==
Digital download
| No. | Title | Length |
|---|---|---|
| 1. | "Anywhere" | 3:36 |

== Chart performance ==
=== Weekly charts ===
| Chart (2016) | Peak position |
|---|---|
| Australia (ARIA) | 43 |
| New Zealand Heatseekers (Recorded Music NZ) | 6 |
| Scotland (OCC) | 53 |
| Slovenia (SloTop50) | 46 |
| Sweden (Sverigetopplistan) | 93 |
| US Adult Alternative Songs (Billboard) | 17 |
| US Hot Rock & Alternative Songs (Billboard) | 30 |

== Release history ==
| Region | Date | Format | Label |
|---|---|---|---|
| United Kingdom | 19 August 2016 | Digital download | Black Crow Records |
