= Runaway Tour (Passenger) =

2018–2019 concert tour by Passenger

- Tour by Passenger
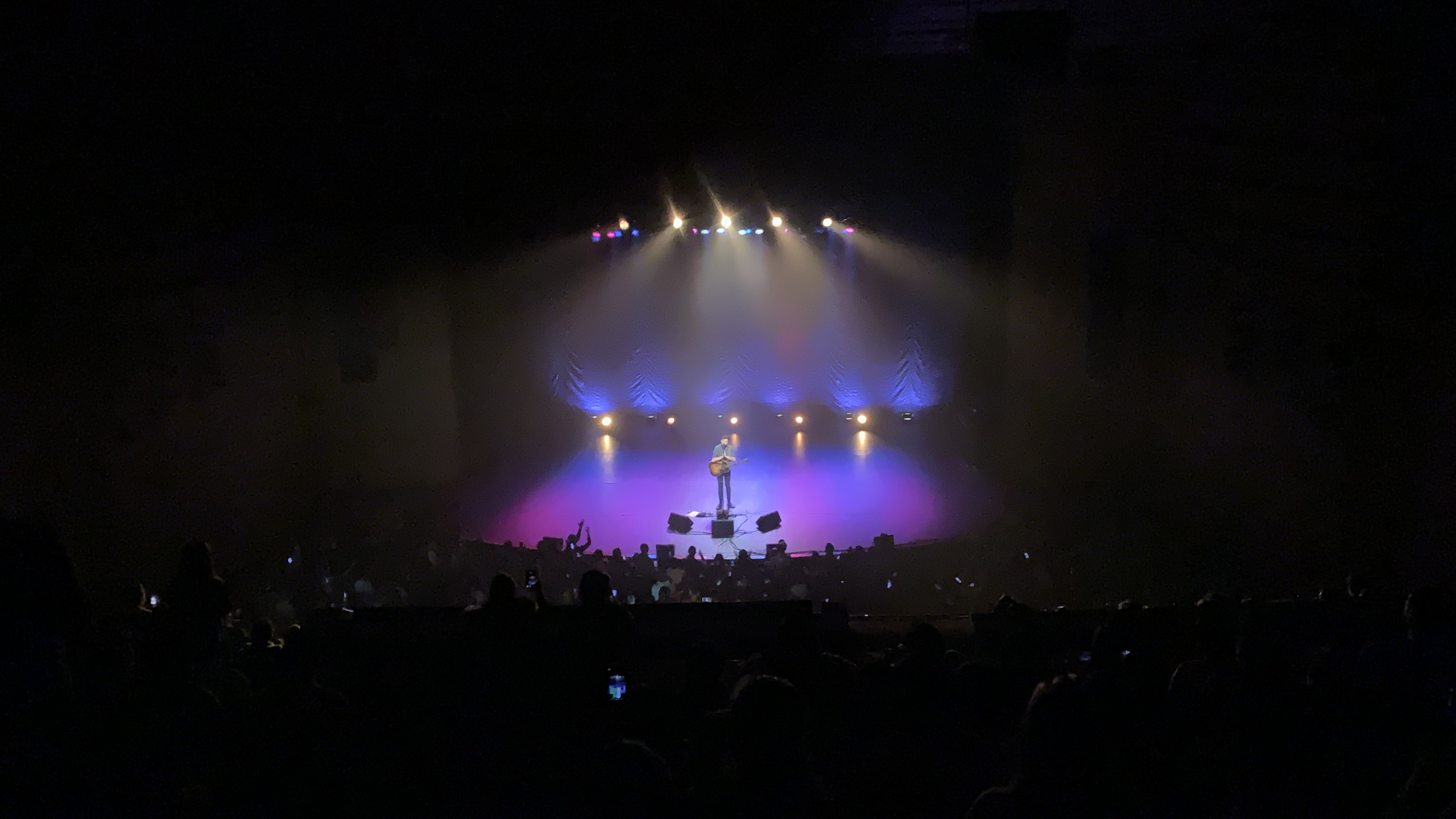
- Passenger performing Let Her Go live in Bogotá, Colombia during his tour
- Associated album: Runaway
- Start date: August 29, 2018

Runaway Tour is a concert tour by British singer and songwriter Passenger in support of his 2018 studio album, Runaway. The tour began on August 29, 2018, in Edinburgh, Scotland.

Passenger's Australian friend Stu Larsen opened his shows from February 20 to April 21, 2019.

== Production ==
When the South American leg of the tour started, Passenger explained that his guitar would speak for itself, and all the songs would have their own stories.

"Every song has its own life, and that's what I like the fans to see in my presentations."

=== Concert synopsis ===
All concerts have featured acoustic instruments. Throughout the tour, Passenger regularly alternates among various acoustic guitars. In a number of venues, he used up to four guitars per performance.

== Critical reception ==
The tour has been very well received by critics. Nicolas Tabares from El Observador, a national newspaper in Uruguay, called the Montevideo performances a "spectacle that connects directly to the crowd". He also commended Passenger on how he "shows all the love that he has to his fans." Caracol Radio from Colombia described the performance in Bogotá, saying that "the performer involves the public with his great hits and funny humor." El Comercio, a newspaper in Peru, described the show in Lima as full of "music empathy".

== Tour dates ==
Date	City	Country	Venue	Opening Act
27 August 2018	Edinburgh	Scotland	Queen's Hall	—
30 August 2018	Glasgow	Scotland	02 ABC	—
1 September 2018	Dublin	Ireland	Vicar Street	—
2 September 2018	Belfast	Northern Ireland	Ulster Hall	—
4 September 2018	Manchester	England	Albert Hall	—
5 September 2018	Birmingham	England	02 Institute	—
8 September 2018	London	England	Roundhouse	—
9 September 2018	Brighton	England	Dome	—
15 septiembre 2018	Munich	Germany	Tonhalle	—
17 September 2018	Zurich	Switzerland	Volkshaus	—
18 September 2018	Milan	Italy	Alcatraz	—
21 September 2018	Copenhagen	Denmark	Vega	—
22 September 2018	Stockholm	Sweden	Gota Lejon	—
24 September 2018	Berlin	Germany	Astra	—
26 September 2018	Amsterdam	Netherlands	Afas Live	—
27 September 2018	Cologne	Germany	Live Music Hall	—
29 September 2018	Antwerp	Belgium	Trix	—
30 September 2018	Paris	France	Yoyo	—
13 October 2018	Nashville	United States	Cannery Ballroom	—
14 October 2018	Atlanta	United States	Teatro Buckhead	—
16 October 2018	Washington, D.C.	United States	9:30 Club	—
18 October 2018	New York City	United States	Brooklyn Steel	—
19 October 2018	Boston	United States	Paradise Rock Club	—
21 October 2018	Vancouver	Canada	Teatro Corona	—
23 October 2018	Toronto	Canada	Teatro Phoenix	—
25 October 2018	Minneapolis	United States	First Avenue	—
27 October 2018	Denver	United States	Teatro Gotio	—
30 October 2018	Vancouver	Canada	Teatro Vogue	—
31 October 2018	Seattle	United States	Showbox & the Market	—
2 November 2018	Portland	United States	Crystal Ballroom	—
4 November 2018	San Francisco	United States	The Fillmore	—
6 November 2018	Los Angeles	United States	The Belasco	—
13 November 2018	Auckland	Australia	Powerstation	—
15 November 2018	Brisbane	Australia	The Tivolti	—
17 November 2018	Melbourne	Australia	The Forum	—
18 November 2018	Sydney	Australia	Teatro Enmore	—
20 November 2018	Adelaide	Australia	The Gov	—
23 November 2018	Perth	Australia	Teatro Astor	—
23 November 2018	Margaret River	Australia	Three Oceans	—
13 February 2019	São Paulo	Brazil	Allianz Parque	Ed Sheeran
14 February 2019	São Paulo	Brazil	Allianz Parque	Ed Sheeran
17 February 2019	Porto Alegre	Brazil	Arena do Gremio	Ed Sheeran
20 February 2019	Montevideo	Uruguay	Estadio Centenario	Ed Sheeran
23 February 2019	Buenos Aires	Argentina	Campo Argentino de Polo	Ed Sheeran
5 March 2019	Santiago	Chile	Teatro Caupolican	Stu Larsen
7 March 2019	Buenos Aires	Argentina	Vorterix	Stu Larsen
8 March 2019	Montevideo	Uruguay	Montevideo Music Box	Stu Larsen
10 March 2019	São Paulo	Brazil	Cine Joia	Stu Larsen
12 March 2019	Lima	Peru	Auditorio Santa Úrsula	Stu Larsen
14 March 2019	Bogotá	Colombia	Jorge Eliecer Gaitan Theatre	Stu Larsen
16 March 2019	Mexico City	Mexico	Plaza Condesa	Stu Larsen
17 March 2019	Monterrey	Mexico	Auditorio Citibanamex	Stu Larsen
18 March 2019	Guadalajara	Mexico	Morelos Park	Stu Larsen
2 April 2019	Madrid	Spain	Teatro Barceló	Stu Larsen
3 April 2019	Barcelona	Spain	Gran Teatre de Liceu	Stu Larsen
5 April 2019	Nîmes	France	Paloma	Stu Larsen
7 April 2019	Bologna	Italy	Estragon	Stu Larsen
9 April 2019	Zermatt	Switzerland	Zermatt Unplugged	Stu Larsen
11 April 2019	Vienna	Austria	Gasometer	Stu Larsen
12 April 2019	Budapest	Hungary	Akvarium	Stu Larsen
14 April 2019	Kraków	Poland	Studio	Stu Larsen
16 April 2019	Prague	Czech Republic	Roxy	Stu Larsen
18 April 2019	Lingen	Germany	Emslandarena	Stu Larsen
20 April 2019	Luxembourg	Luxembourg	Den Atelier	Stu Larsen
21 April 2019	Meierijstad	Netherlands	Paaspop	
23 November 2019	Johannesburg	South Africa	Ticketpro Dome	
26 November 2019	Cape Town	South Africa	Grand West Arena	
