= Sometimes It's Something, Sometimes It's Nothing at All =

Studio album by Passenger
- Released: 2 May 2019
- Recorded: 2018
- Studio: Abbey Road Studios
- Length: 27:58
- Label: Black Crow

Passenger chronology
Runaway (2018)	Sometimes It's Something, Sometimes It's Nothing at All (2019)	Patchwork (2020)

Sometimes It's Something, Sometimes It's Nothing at All is the tenth studio album by English singer-songwriter Passenger. It was released on 2 May 2019 by Black Crow Records. All profits from the album will go to Shelter, a registered charity that campaigns to end homelessness and bad housing in England and Scotland.

== Background ==
Passenger recorded the album at Abbey Road Studios with a string quartet. He also announced that profits from the album will go to Shelter, a registered charity that campaigns to end homelessness and bad housing in England and Scotland. Passenger visited a store in King's Cross, London where he met staff and a woman who was homeless and helped by the charity. During his visit he played the title track from the new album live for the first time. He said, "When I started out, I spent a lot of time busking around the UK and in Brighton where I live, which really opened my eyes to the number of people forced to sleep rough. So, I was even more shocked when Shelter told me about the thousands of homeless families out there, hidden from view in hostels and emergency bed and breakfasts. It’s made me realise how lucky I am to have a safe place to call home – something everyone should have – so this donation is something I could do to help in a small way."

== Track listing ==
Standard edition
No.	Title	Length
1.	"Restless Wind"	3:47
2.	"Sometimes It's Something, Sometimes It's Nothing at All"	2:09
3.	"Rosie"	1:58
4.	"Let Me Dream a While"	3:41
5.	"Only Time"	2:44
6.	"Helplessly Lost"	2:25
7.	"Paper Cut, Chinese Burn"	2:21
8.	"Where the Lights Hang Low"	3:04
9.	"Moon on the Water"	4:19
10.	"Winter Coats"	1:30

== Charts ==
Chart (2019)	Peak position
Australian Albums (ARIA Digital Album Chart)	8
Swiss Albums (Schweizer Hitparade)	31

== Release history ==
Region	Date	Label	Format
United Kingdom	2 May 2019	Black Crow	Digital download, CD
