= Passenger (singer) =

English musician (born 1984)

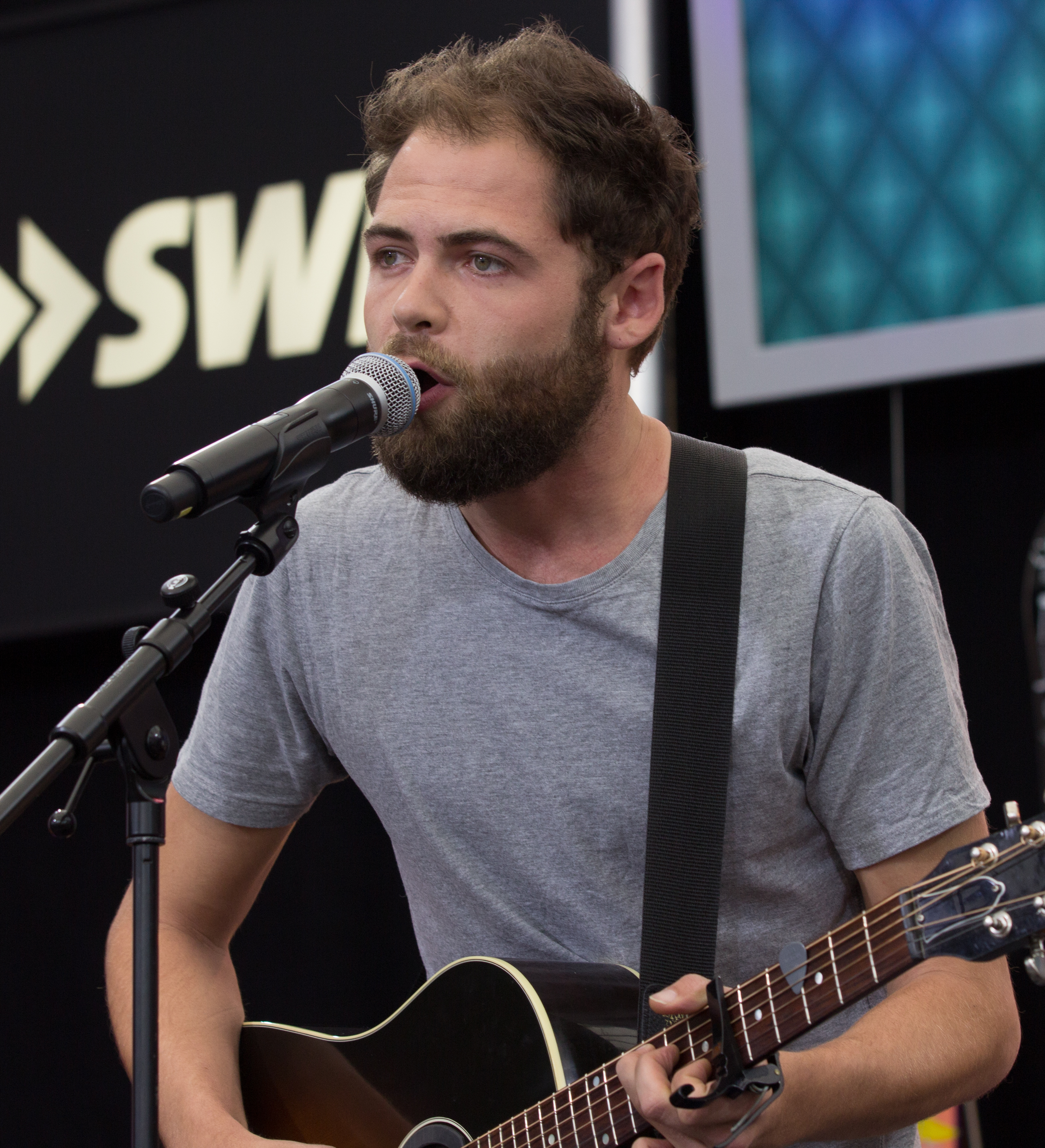
- Rosenberg performing in 2013

Background information
- Born: Michael David Rosenberg; 17 May 1984 (age 42); Brighton, England
- Genres: Folk rock; indie folk; indie pop
- Occupations: Singer-songwriter; musician
- Instruments: Vocals; guitar
- Years active: 2001–present
- Labels: Nettwerk; Black Crow
- Formerly of: Passenger
- Website: passengermusic.com

Michael David Rosenberg (born 17 May 1984), better known by his stage name Passenger, is an English indie folk singer, songwriter and musician. From the 2000s, Rosenberg fronted a band by the same name; he opted to keep the Passenger moniker for his solo work after the band dissolved. Rosenberg is best known for the 2012 song "Let Her Go", which topped the charts in 16 countries and accumulated more than 4 billion views on YouTube. Because Rosenberg was based in Australia at the time of release (and the clip itself was filmed at the Factory Theatre in Marrickville), it is the most-viewed Australian YouTube video ever. In 2014, the song was nominated for the Brit Award for British Single of the Year, and he received the British Academy's Ivor Novello Award for Most Performed Work.

A prolific singer-songwriter, Rosenberg has released 15 studio albums to date: one with the band Passenger, and 14 as a solo artist. The most recent of these, One for the Road, was released in September 2025.

== Early life ==
Rosenberg was born on 17 May 1984 in Brighton to Quaker parents, English mother Jane and American Jewish father, Gerard Rosenberg, originally from Vineland, New Jersey. He has a sister, and learned classical guitar at a young age, beginning to write songs when he was 14 or 15 years old. He left school when he was 16 years old to pursue a music career, and spent the next few years as a busker in England and Australia.

== Music career ==
=== Early years ===
Rosenberg did his first performance when he was 16 years old. His father, a film production worker, introduced him to Jamie Catto, a former member of the band Faithless, in 2001; it led to Rosenberg getting a two-song spot at the Free Burma Campaign benefit concert at the Royal Court in London in 2002. That night, he met his future writing partner, Andrew Phillips, and established contact with the IE Music label. Back in Brighton, Phillips and Rosenberg pooled their musical influences (from Simon & Garfunkel to DJ Shadow), and started writing songs at Phillips' in-house studio in Hove. In 2003, they formed the Mike Rosenberg Band, engaging Marcus O'Dair (bass), Alon Cohen (drums) and Richard Brinklow (keyboards) through connections within the Brighton music scene.

=== 2003–2009: Passenger ===
Rosenberg founded the band Passenger with Andrew Phillips in 2003 in Brighton and Hove. The name of the band was stylised as /Passenger. (with a slash at the beginning and a dot at the end). The five-piece band's only album, Wicked Man's Rest, was released in 2007, on Chalkmark. Rosenberg wrote the majority of the album's tracks, with the exception of "Four Horses", which was written by Phillips. The band broke up in 2009.

=== 2009–2010: Solo career and Wide Eyes Blind Love, Divers and Submarines and Flight of the Crow ===
After the break-up of Passenger, Rosenberg kept the band's name as his personal stage name, and took to busking for a solo music career. In October 2009 he moved to Australia, where he supported acts such as Lior and Sydneysiders Elana Stone and Brian Campeau. He then played at One Movement, a major music industry-focused festival in Perth. This earned him a following in Australia and he was selling out 500-seater venues across Australia. His debut solo album, Wide Eyes Blind Love, was released in 2009. It was produced and mixed by former bandmate Andrew Phillips, who also provided backing vocals, guitar and other instruments, and featured vocals by Isobel Anderson. Rosenberg also played various shows in the United Kingdom during this time, including a support slot for Turin Brakes' tenth anniversary show at Theatre Royal, Drury Lane in London.

Rosenberg produced a fans-only limited release Divers and Submarines, again supported by former bandmate Andrew Phillips and vocalist Isobel Anderson. His third studio album, Flight of the Crow, was recorded in Australia and saw him joined in the studio by various Australian artists including Lior, Kate Miller-Heidke, Boy & Bear, Josh Pyke and Katie Noonan.

=== 2011–2013: All The Little Lights ===
Rosenberg's fourth album, All the Little Lights, was released in the summer of 2012 in North America on Nettwerk Records. Recorded at Linear Recording in Sydney, Rosenberg worked with a core Australian band that included Boy & Bear drummer Tim Hart, jazz bassist Cameron Undy, and keyboards player Stu Hunter, from Katie Noonan and The Captains. During the summer and autumn of 2012, Rosenberg toured the UK, opening for Jools Holland and Ed Sheeran, the latter of whom he had known since Sheeran was about 15 while living in Cambridge. He joined Australian acts the John Butler Trio, and Josh Pyke with a co-headlined UK tour. He also opened for Ed Sheeran's 2012 North American tour and also in Paris. He also opened for Ed Sheeran on four of his five sell-out dates in Ireland in January 2013 and in Australia and New Zealand in early 2013, and supported Sheeran in his Brighton dates and in Reading. Rosenberg performed "All the Little Lights" at the Children in Need Rocks concert at the Hammersmith Apollo in London, broadcast on BBC One on 14 November 2013.

=== 2014–2015: Whispers and Whispers II ===
On 24 March 2014, Rosenberg unveiled "Whispers", the title track of his new album, as part of his set at the Teenage Cancer Trust charity concert at the Royal Albert Hall in London where he also performed alongside Ed Sheeran. On 26 March 2014 Rosenberg announced details of his fifth studio album. He released Whispers on 9 June 2014. Talking to Digital Spy about the album, he said: "This is easily the most 'up' album I've ever made, it's quite cinematic. There are lots of big stories and big ideas. There are also some sombre moments about loneliness and death but hey, it wouldn't be a Passenger album without those". He released "Hearts on Fire" as the album's lead single on 14 April 2014.

Rosenberg recorded Whispers II at the same time as recording Whispers. Whispers II was released on 20 April 2015. All profits from the album go to the UNICEF UK initiative to help children in Liberia.

=== 2016–2017: Young as the Morning, Old as the Sea and The Boy Who Cried Wolf ===
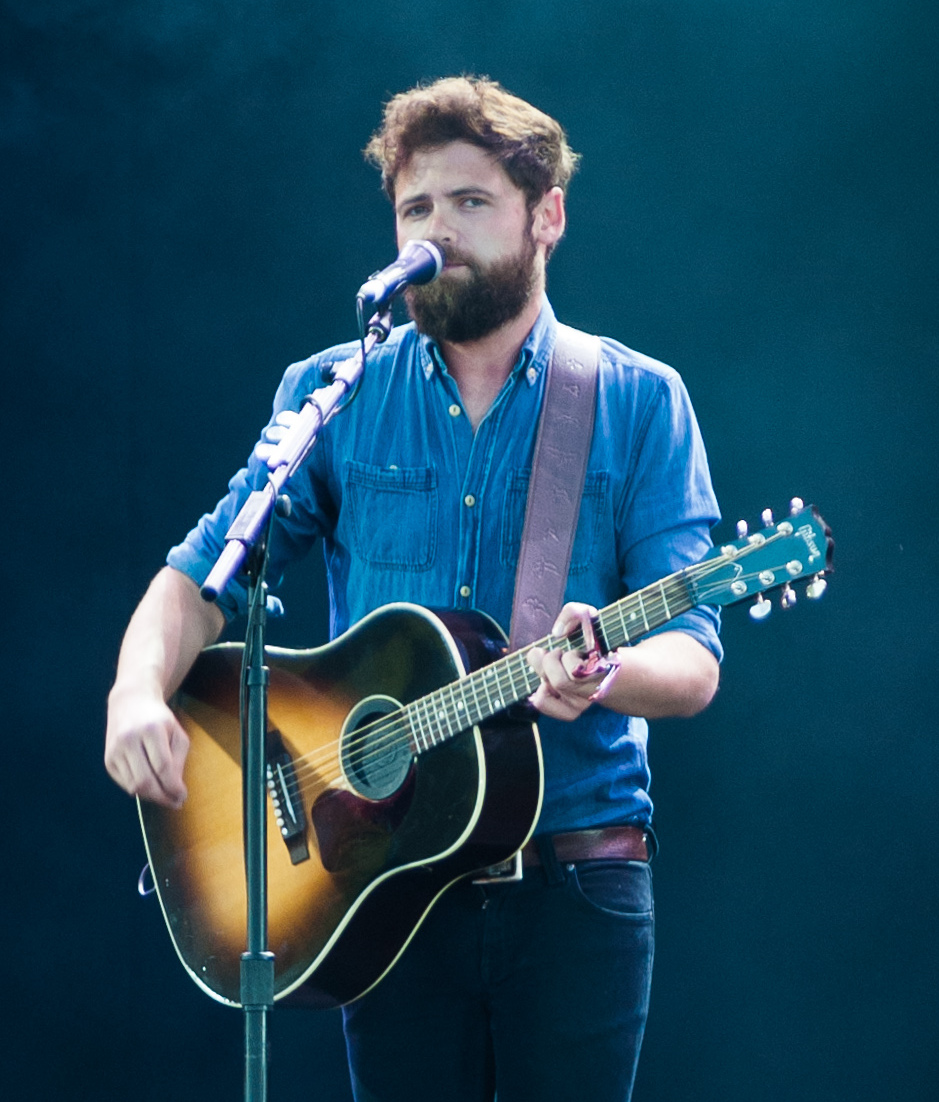
Passenger performing in 2016

On 16 June 2016, the music video for "Somebody's Love" was uploaded to his YouTube channel, thereby announcing his seventh album, Young as the Morning, Old as the Sea. A second track from the album, "Anywhere" was released on 19 August 2016. Young as the Morning, Old as the Sea was released on 23 September 2016, and became Passenger's first UK number one album.

On 25 July 2017, at the end of his Young as the Morning, Old as the Sea tour, Rosenberg announced via the Passenger Facebook page that his performance on Sunday 23 July would be "my/our last gig for a while". The following day, he announced that his eighth album, The Boy Who Cried Wolf, would be released two days later on 28 July 2017. The album was announced with a livestream of the album performed live in its entirety, broadcast from Passenger's studio simultaneously to YouTube and Facebook. The album charted at number 5 in the Official UK Charts.

=== 2018: Runaway ===
On 18 May 2018, Passenger released the song "Hell or High Water". It was recorded in a variety of different national parks across Utah, Nevada, Arizona and California In the following days, he also announced an autumn European tour and teased fans through social media with a cover for a new album.

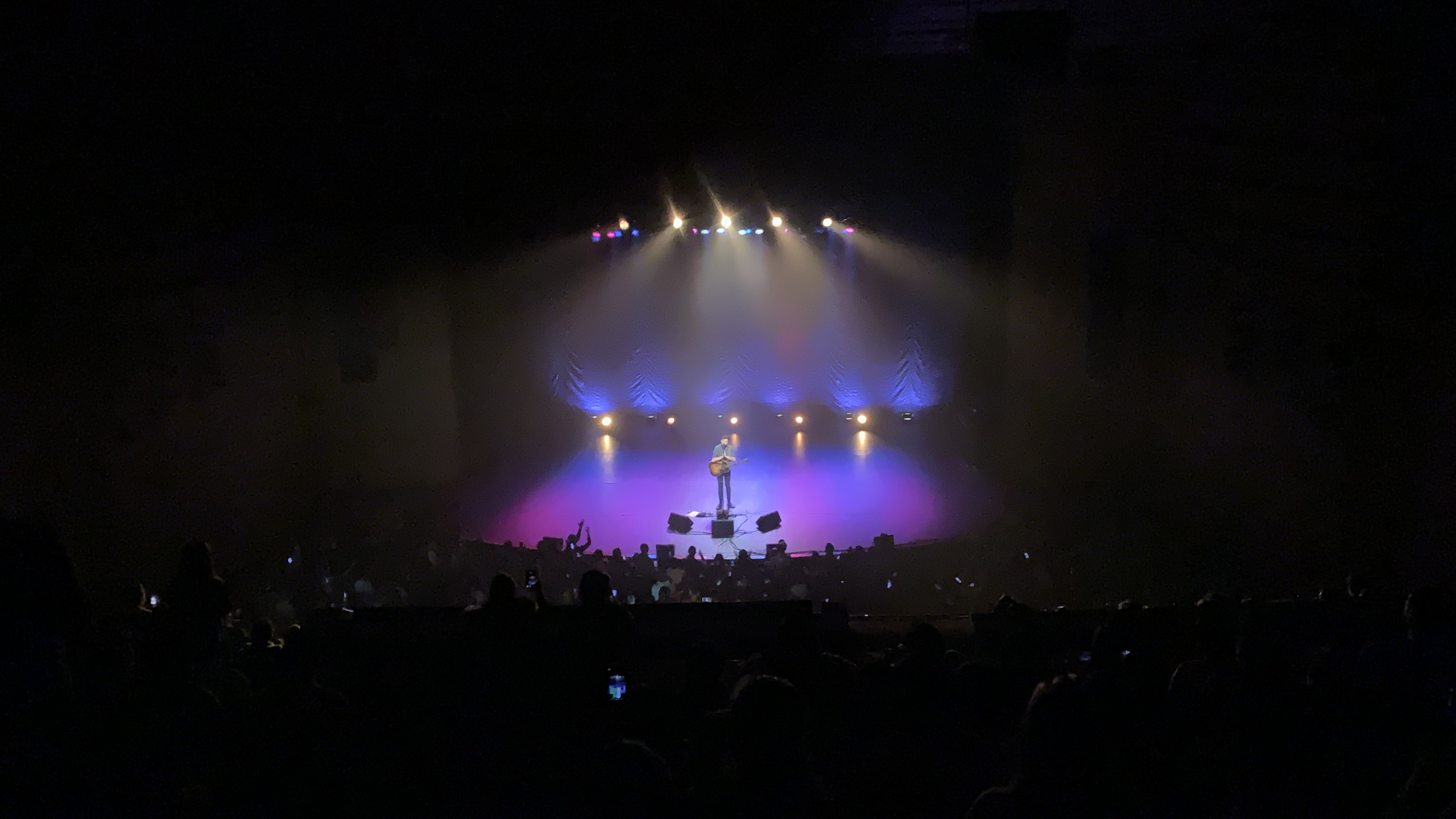
Passenger during his Runaway Tour performing Let Her Go in Bogotá, Colombia

On 25 May 2018, he formally announced his ninth studio album, Runaway, and released a live acoustic version of "Hell or High Water" recorded in Venice, Los Angeles. Passenger described Runaway as a concept album, as he realised many of the songs had a strong sense of Americana. He also believed the songs would work well accompanied by American visuals and thus, alongside long-time collaborators Jarrad Seng, Stu Larsen and Chris Vallejo, embarked on a three-week-long road trip through the United States to film videos for each track. Additionally, they recorded acoustic videos for each track, filmed in a variety of different locations. Rosenberg plans to release a song every three weeks, sharing both the official and acoustic videos, plus behind-the-scenes footage. Runaway was released on 31 August 2018.

=== 2019–2020: Sometimes It's Something, Sometimes It's Nothing at All, Patchwork and world tour ===
On 18 March 2019, Passenger released the song "Restless Wind" on YouTube. Two more songs, "Helplessly Lost" and "Paper Cut, Chinese Burn", were subsequently released a month later, as well as a cover of Fleetwood Mac's "Landslide". On 2 May 2019, Passenger both announced and released his tenth album, Sometimes It's Something, Sometimes It's Nothing at All. Unlike more recent Passenger albums, the record is arranged entirely for vocals, acoustic guitar and a string quartet. All the profits from sales will be donated to Shelter, a UK-based homeless charity.

At the end of January, Passenger announced a world tour including dates in the UK, Europe, Australia, North America, and New Zealand. On 20 March 2020, he announced and released his new single "The Way That I Love You" with a video. On 1 May 2020, he released his new single "London In The Spring". On 10 July 2020, Passenger released his eleventh album Patchwork. The album was written and recorded during the coronavirus lockdown alongside producer Chris Vallejo and guest musicians Andrew Phillips (a collaborator of Rosenberg's and formerly of the band Passenger) and Richard Brinklow. The record was released as a funding project for The Trussell Trust, an NGO and charity that works to end the need for food banks in the UK.

=== 2020–2021: Songs for the Drunk and Broken Hearted ===
On 8 January 2021, Passenger released Songs for the Drunk and Broken Hearted. The record was supposed to be released by early 2020, but later delayed due to the coronavirus lockdown. The record's release supports both Ecologi and Eden Reforestation Projects, non-profit organisations aiming to rebuild natural landscapes destroyed by deforestation. A tree will be planted for every physical copy of the album sold via the Passenger store.

=== 2022: Birds That Flew and Ships That Sailed ===
On April 14, 2022, Passenger released his 14th studio album, Birds That Flew and Ships That Sailed. The album was released independently, without a record label or a press team. The record release supports Plastic Bank, a social enterprise that combats plastic pollution in the ocean. The record debuted at Number 35 on the Official UK Albums Chart, marking Passenger's 8th album to enter the UK Top 40.

=== 2025: The Unlikely Pilgrimage of Harold Fry musical ===
In February 2025, it was announced that Passenger will write the music and lyrics for the stage musical adaptation of The Unlikely Pilgrimage of Harold Fry by Rachel Joyce. The musical premiered at Minerva Theatre, Chichester in May 2025. The show transferred to the West End, starting 29 January 2026. On 10 September 2025, Passenger released One for the Road (Songs from the Unlikely Pilgrimage of Harold Fry the Musical), including "Song for the Countryside", featuring Jack Wolfe, who originated the role of the Balladeer and "Walk Upon the Water" featuring The Kingdom Choir. On the same day, tickets for the West End production went on sale.

== Personal life ==
Rosenberg currently lives in Brighton. He is a fan of English football club Arsenal F.C. In a 2021 interview, he said he became an Arsenal supporter despite being from Brighton after watching Arsenal beating Sheffield Wednesday F.C. in the FA Cup Final in 1993. In May 2015, Rosenberg appeared at Arsenal's 'A Night to Inspire' event and played a version of the '49 Undefeated' fan chant.

== Awards and nominations ==
Year	Award	Category	Nominee/work	Result	Ref.
2013	Independent Music Awards	Best Folk/Singer-Songwriter Song	"Let Her Go"	Won	
2014	Brit Awards	British Single of the Year	"Let Her Go"	Nominated	
2014	Ivor Novello Awards	Most Performed Work	"Let Her Go"	Won	
2014	iHeartRadio Music Awards	Best New Artist	Passenger	Nominated	
2014	Echo Music Prize	Best International Newcomer	Passenger	Nominated	
2014	Echo Music Prize	Best International Male	Passenger	Nominated	
2014	Echo Music Prize	Hit of the Year	"Let Her Go"	Nominated	
2019	Pop Awards	Album Of The Year Award	Runaway	Nominated	
2022	Pop Awards	Male Artist Of The Year Award	Passenger	Nominated	
2023	Pop Awards	Album Of The Year Award	Birds That Flew and Ships That Sailed	Nominated	

== Tours ==
- All the Little Lights Tour (2012–13)
- Whispers Tour (2014)
- Whispers II North American Tour (2015)
- Whispers ll Australia Tour (2015–16)
- Young as the Morning Old as the Sea Tour (2016–17)
- Runaway Tour (2018–19)
- World Tour (2020–21)
- Anniversary Tour (2023–24)
- Asia Tour (2025)
- Wild Love Tour (2027)

== Discography ==
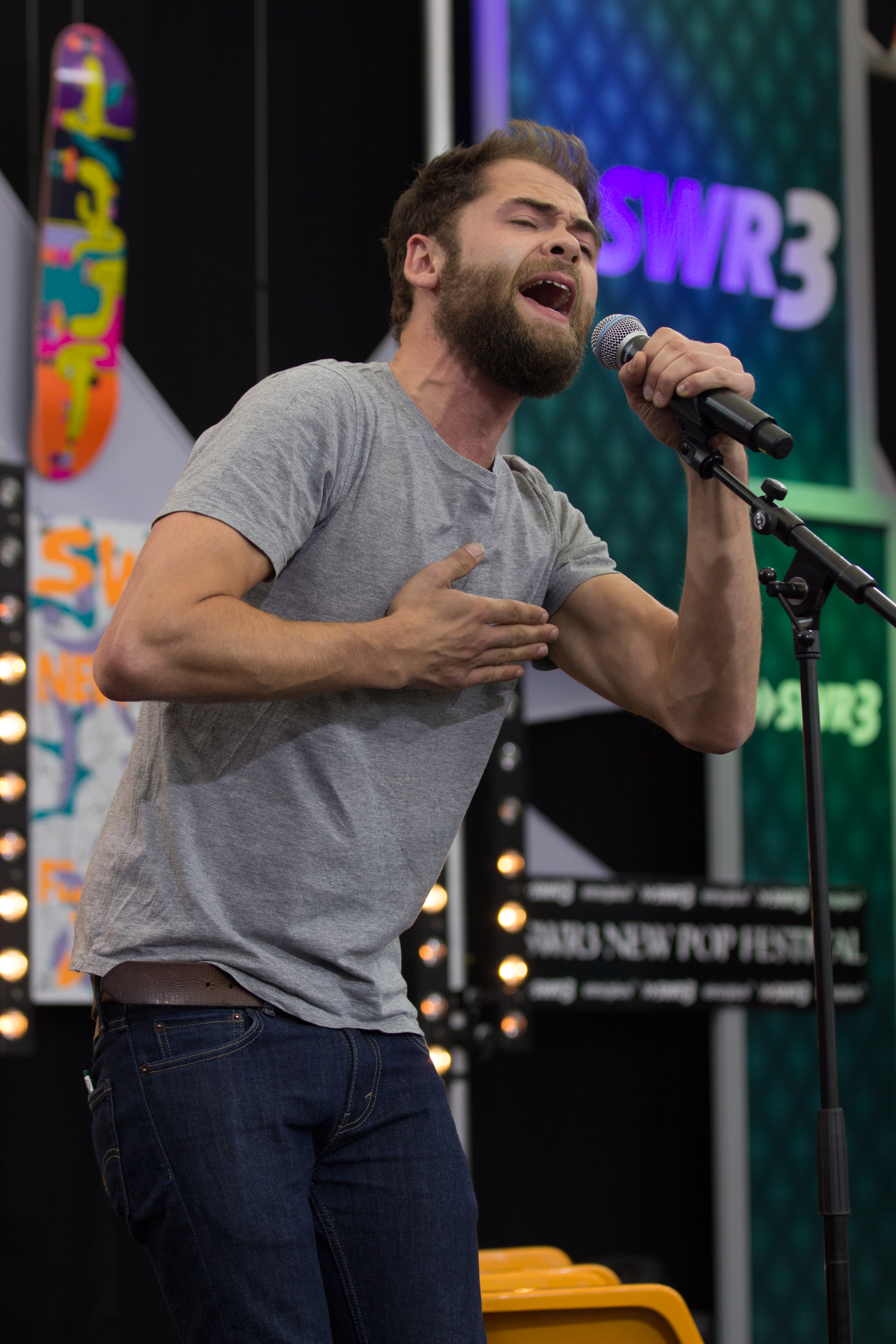
Passenger performing in 2013

=== Studio albums ===
==== with the Band 'Passenger' ====
- Wicked Man's Rest (2007)

==== solo career ====
- Wide Eyes Blind Love (2009)
- Divers & Submarines (2010)
- Flight of the Crow (2010)
- All the Little Lights (2012) (Note: In 2023, Passenger released a re-recorded version of this album, subtitled "Anniversary Edition", featuring duets with Ed Sheeran, Gabrielle Aplin, Foy Vance and Nina Nesbitt.)
- Whispers (2014)
- Whispers II (2015)
- Young as the Morning Old as the Sea (2016)
- The Boy Who Cried Wolf (2017)
- Runaway (2018)
- Sometimes It's Something, Sometimes It's Nothing at All (2019)
- Patchwork (2020)
- Songs for the Drunk and Broken Hearted (2021)
- Birds That Flew and Ships That Sailed (2022)
- One for the Road (Songs from the Unlikely Pilgrimage of Harold Fry the Musical) (2025)
- Wild Love (2026)

=== Other albums ===
- Sunday Night Sessions (2017)
- Passenger (Live from San Francisco) (2023)
