= Heart's on Fire (Passenger song) =

Single by Passenger

from the album Whispers
- Released: 14 April 2014
- Recorded: 2013
- Genre: Folk; pop
- Length: 4:13
- Label: Black Crow
- Songwriter(s): Michael David Rosenberg

Passenger singles chronology
"Scare Away the Dark" (2014)	"Heart's on Fire" (2014)	"Whispers" (2014)

Music video
- "Heart's on Fire" on YouTube

"Heart's on Fire" is a song by English singer-songwriter Passenger. The song was released as a digital download on 14 April 2014 in the United Kingdom, as the second single from his fifth studio album, Whispers (2014). The song was written by Michael David Rosenberg.

== Background ==
Talking to Digital Spy about the song he said, "Heart's on Fire' is a nostalgic song. It's about when the timing with someone isn't right, even though the person might be. And although you're not with that person at the time, there may be a moment in the future where the relationship makes more sense."

== Music video ==
A music video to accompany the release of "Heart's on Fire" was first released onto YouTube on 14 April 2014 at a total length of three minutes and forty-six seconds. The video shows Mike walking through a forest. The video was directed, shot and edited by Jarrad Seng.

Prior to the release of the official music video, Passenger had released an unofficial duo acoustic version of the song in a music video filmed in Dublin. Released on Passenger's YouTube account on 23 February 2013, it is a collaboration with Ed Sheeran with whom Passenger was touring. The video starts with a brief rendition of "Wild Mountain Thyme".

== Track listing ==
Digital download
No.	Title	Length
1.	"Heart's on Fire"	4:13

== Chart performance ==
=== Weekly charts ===
Chart (2014)	Peak position
Australia (ARIA)	26
Belgium (Ultratip Bubbling Under Flanders)	23
Belgium (Ultratip Bubbling Under Wallonia)	33
Canada (Canadian Hot 100)	83
Ireland (IRMA)	58
Netherlands (Single Top 100)	85
UK Singles (OCC)	63

== Certifications ==
Region	Certification	Certified units/sales
Canada (Music Canada)	Gold	40,000^{‡}
^{‡} Sales+streaming figures based on certification alone.

== Release history ==
Region	Date	Format	Label
United Kingdom	14 April 2014	Digital download	Black Crow
