= The Boy Who Cried Wolf (Passenger album) =

Studio album by Passenger
- Released: 28 July 2017
- Recorded: 2016
- Genre: Traditional Folk
- Length: 35:36
- Label: Black Crow Records

Passenger chronology
Sunday Night Sessions (2017)	The Boy Who Cried Wolf (2017)	Runaway (2018)

Passenger studio album chronology
Young as the Morning, Old as the Sea (2016)	The Boy Who Cried Wolf (2017)	Runaway (2018)

Singles from The Boy Who Cried Wolf
- 1. "Simple Song" Released: 26 July 2017; 2. "The Boy Who Cried Wolf" Released: 26 July 2017

The Boy Who Cried Wolf is the eighth studio album by English singer-songwriter Passenger. It was released on 28 July 2017 on Black Crow Records. The album peaked at number 5 on the UK Albums Chart.

== Singles ==
"Simple Song" and "The Boy Who Cried Wolf" were released as the album's lead singles on 26 July 2017. "Simple Song" did not enter the New Zealand Singles Chart, but peaked at number 9 on the Heatseekers Singles Chart.

== Track listing ==
No.	Title	Length
1.	"Simple Song"	3:48
2.	"Sweet Louise"	3:56
3.	"The Boy Who Cried Wolf"	3:16
4.	"Walls"	3:41
5.	"Setting Suns"	4:17
6.	"And I Love Her"	2:42
7.	"Someday"	4:07
8.	"In the End"	3:04
9.	"Thunder and Lightning"	1:44
10.	"Lanterns"	5:01

== Charts ==
Chart (2017)	Peak position
Australian Albums (ARIA)	6
Belgian Albums (Ultratop Flanders)	70
Belgian Albums (Ultratop Wallonia)	149
Canadian Albums (Billboard)	30
Dutch Albums (Album Top 100)	16
Irish Albums (IRMA)	30
New Zealand Albums (RMNZ)	18
Norwegian Albums (VG-lista)	28
Scottish Albums (OCC)	4
Swiss Albums (Schweizer Hitparade)	12
UK Albums (OCC)	5
US Independent Albums (Billboard)	11

== Release history ==
Region	Date	Label	Format
United Kingdom	28 July 2017	Black Crow Records	Digital download, CD
