= Patchwork (Passenger album) =

Studio album by Passenger
- Released: 10 July 2020
- Recorded: 2020
- Length: 25:49
- Label: Black Crow Records
- Producer: Chris Vallejo

Passenger chronology
Sometimes It's Something, Sometimes It's Nothing at All (2019)	Patchwork (2020)	Songs for the Drunk and Broken Hearted (2021)

Patchwork is the eleventh studio album by English singer-songwriter Passenger. It was released on 10 July 2020 by Black Crow Records. All profits from the album go to The Trussell Trust, a registered NGO and charity that works to end the need for food banks in the United Kingdom.

== Background ==
Passenger wrote and recorded the album during the 2020 COVID-19 lockdown, alongside producer Chris Vallejo and guest musicians Andrew Phillips (formerly of the band Passenger alongside Rosenberg) and Richard Brinklow. The album consists of eight tracks, including a cover of the 2018 Lewis Capaldi single "Someone You Loved". The album was released only digitally, on various streaming and digital download services. All revenues from the album will be donated to The Trussell Trust's food banks campaign. In announcing the album, Passenger wrote on Instagram that the songs were "a massive source of hope and comfort to me" during the "strange and lonely feeling" of being stuck at home, and that "the whole album comes from an extremely honest and vulnerable place". He also wrote that the album was dedicated to his newborn baby niece, Skye.

== Track listing ==
Standard edition
No.	Title	Length
1.	"Sword from the Stone (Patchwork version)"	3:33
2.	"Year on Year, Day by Day (Patchwork version)"	3:26
3.	"Patchwork"	2:56
4.	"Venice Canals"	3:09
5.	"Queenstown"	4:06
6.	"Swimming Upstream"	2:24
7.	"Someone You Loved (Cover)"	3:04
8.	"Summer Rain"	3:17
Total length:		25:49

== Charts ==
Chart performance for Patchwork
Chart (2020)	Peak position
Scottish Albums (OCC)	85
Swiss Albums (Schweizer Hitparade)	80

== Release history ==
Region	Date	Label	Format
Worldwide	10 July 2020	Black Crow Records	Digital download
