= Wicked Man's Rest =

Studio album by Passenger
- Released: 17 September 2007
- Recorded: 2007
- Genre: Soft rock; folk rock
- Length: 44:25
- Label: Embassy of Music
- Producer: Andrew Philips; John Reynolds; Tim Oliver

Passenger chronology
Wicked Man's Rest (2007)	Wide Eyes Blind Love (2009)

Singles from Wicked Man's Rest
- 1. "Wicked Man's Rest" Released: 2007; 2. "Walk You Home" Released: 2007

Wicked Man's Rest is the debut and sole studio album of the British band Passenger (stylized as /Passenger.) fronted by Mike Rosenberg. The single "Walk You Home" taken from the album charted in Britain reaching number 134 in the UK Singles Chart.

Since the release of the album, Passenger has split up, with lead singer Mike Rosenberg continuing with a solo career also under the name Passenger.

== Track listing ==
All tracks are written by Andrew Philips and Mike Rosenberg

No.	Title	Length
1.	"Wicked Man's Rest"	4:19
2.	"Walk You Home (Night Vision Binoculars)"	3:42
3.	"Things You've Never Done"	4:33
4.	"Girl I Once Knew"	2:11
5.	"Do What You Like"	3:52
6.	"Needle in the Dark"	5:05
7.	"Four Horses"	4:10
8.	"You're on My Mind"	4:37
9.	"For You"	3:24
10.	"Walk in the Rain"	5:17
11.	"Table for One"	3:15

== Singles ==
- "Wicked Man's Rest"
- "Walk You Home"
- "Do What You Like"
- "Table for One"
