= Songs for the Drunk and Broken Hearted =

Studio album by Passenger
- Released: 8 January 2021
- Recorded: 2019–2021
- Genre: Folk rock; indie folk
- Length: 35:48
- Label: Black Crow
- Producer: Chris Vallejo

Passenger chronology
Patchwork (2020)	Songs for the Drunk and Broken Hearted (2021)	Birds That Flew and Ships That Sailed (2022)

Singles from Songs for the Drunk and Broken Hearted
- 1. "The Way That I Love You" Released: 20 March 2020; 2. "London in the Spring" Released: 1 May 2020; 3. "A Song for the Drunk and Broken Hearted" Released: 23 October 2020; 4. "Suzanne" Released: 13 November 2020; 5. "Remember to Forget" Released: 11 December 2020; 6. "Sword from the Stone" Released: 8 January 2021

Songs for the Drunk and Broken Hearted is the twelfth studio album by English singer-songwriter Passenger. Recording started in 2019 and the album released on 8 January 2021 by Black Crow Records. All profits from the album go to Ecologi and Eden Reforestation Project, a nonprofit organization that works in developing countries to rebuild natural landscapes destroyed by deforestation. A tree will be planted for every physical copy of the album sold via the Passenger store.

== Background ==
Before releasing Songs for the Drunk and Broken Hearted, Passenger wrote and recorded his standalone record, Patchwork during the 2020 coronavirus lockdown, alongside producer Chris Vallejo and guest musicians Andrew Phillips (formerly of the band Passenger alongside Rosenberg) and Richard Brinklow. It was made along partnership with The Trussell Trust, an NGO that focused on food banks charity in United Kingdom. Mike Rosenberg confirmed that the album was originally in process of recording back before the coronavirus pandemic.

Rosenberg stated that he spent most of time recording in Sydney. The initial release of the album was supposed to be in early 2020, but was later pushed back to early 2021 due to the COVID-19 pandemic.

== Composition ==
=== Music ===
The idea of making Patchwork as a complete acoustic record made him tempted to give more sound varieties, thus later presented in Songs for the Drunk and Broken Hearted. During lockdown making Patchwork, several songs were later added in the album. Even though, due to his small-spaced home studio, the recording session was made separately.

On 25 January 2020, "Sandstorm" was teased as an acoustic version on YouTube, and an acoustic version of "Sword from the Stone" was included as the first track on Patchwork (named as Patchwork version).

=== Lyrics ===
Rosenberg stated that he wrote lyrics for the album when he was newly single, and almost related to his life; about being in breakups, drunk, and dealing with life in general. He added: "I think it's a very strange world we live in, and everything I experienced usually percolates around the brain box for a little bit and then gets channeled into the songwriting, so a breakup is no different. It’s a very extreme version of that."

== Packaging ==
The physical packaging of the album, along with all CDs and vinyl sold via Passenger's official store, is made of 100% recycled materials.

== Track listing ==
All songs were written by Mike Rosenberg.

Standard edition
No.	Title	Length
1.	"Sword from the Stone"	3:21
2.	"Tip of My Tongue"	3:01
3.	"What You're Waiting For"	2:37
4.	"The Way That I Love You"	2:39
5.	"Remember to Forget"	3:38
6.	"Sandstorm"	5:01
7.	"A Song for the Drunk and Broken Hearted"	3:59
8.	"Suzanne"	4:15
9.	"Nothing Aches Like a Broken Heart"	4:16
10.	"London in the Spring"	3:01
Total length:		35:48

Deluxe edition bonus disc
No.	Title	Length
1.	"London in the Spring" (acoustic)	2:56
2.	"Nothing Aches Like a Broken Heart" (acoustic)	3:17
3.	"Suzanne" (acoustic)	4:05
4.	"A Song for the Drunk and Broken Hearted" (acoustic)	3:56
5.	"Sandstorm" (acoustic)	4:10
6.	"Remember to Forget" (acoustic)	3:36
7.	"The Way That I Love You" (acoustic)	2:37
8.	"What You're Waiting For" (acoustic)	2:36
9.	"Tip of My Tongue" (acoustic)	3:00
10.	"Sword from the Stone" (acoustic)	3:33
Total length:		69:34

== Charts ==
Chart performance for Songs for the Drunk and Broken Hearted
Chart (2021)	Peak position
Australian Albums (ARIA)	6
Austrian Albums (Ö3 Austria)	14
Belgian Albums (Ultratop Flanders)	28
Belgian Albums (Ultratop Wallonia)	188
Dutch Albums (Album Top 100)	18
German Albums (Offizielle Top 100)	6
New Zealand Albums (RMNZ)	33
Spanish Albums (PROMUSICAE)	75
Swiss Albums (Schweizer Hitparade)	2
UK Albums (OCC)	2

== Release history ==
Region	Date	Label	Format
Various	8 January 2021	Black Crow	Digital download, CD, vinyl
