= Rachel Joyce (writer) =

British writer

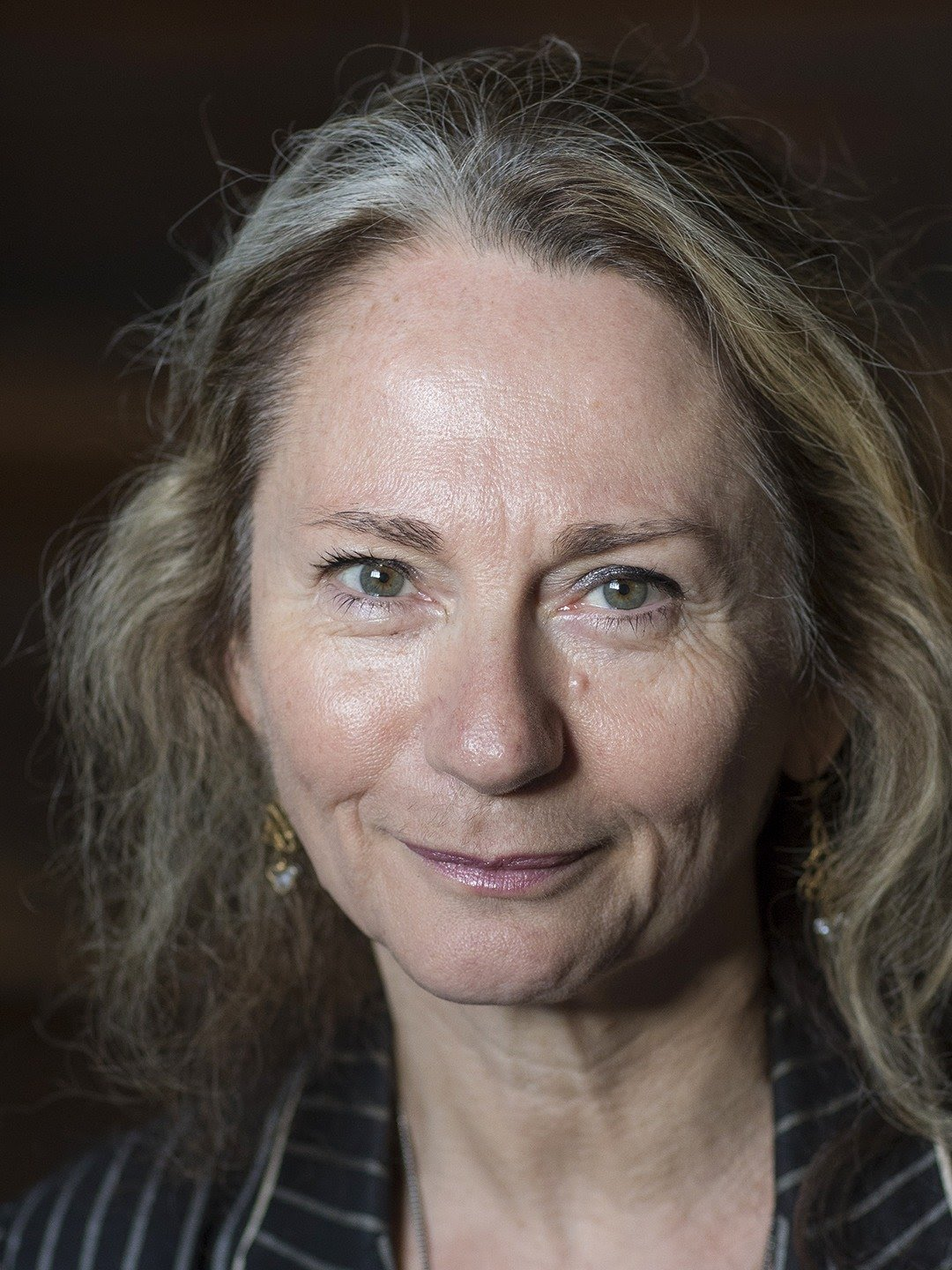
Rachel Joyce

Rachel Joyce (born 1962) is a British writer. She has written plays for BBC Radio 4, and jointly won the 2007 Tinniswood Award for her radio play To Be a Pilgrim. Her debut novel, The Unlikely Pilgrimage of Harold Fry, was on the longlist for the 2012 Man Booker Prize, and in December 2012 she was awarded the "New Writer of the Year" award by the National Book Awards for this book.

She had an earlier career as an actress, and has said that between her first writing ambitions aged 14 and the writing of her first novel she was "a young woman, a mother, an actress, a writer of radio drama - not to mention a terrible waitress in a wine bar, a door-to-door sales girl for one morning, and an assistant in a souvenir shop".

She is married to actor Paul Venables, and lives in Gloucestershire with her husband and four children.

She is the sister of actress Emily Joyce.

== Books ==
- The Unlikely Pilgrimage of Harold Fry (2012, Doubleday: ISBN 9780857520647)
- Perfect (2013, Doubleday: ISBN 9780857520661)
- The Love Song of Miss Queenie Hennessy (2014, Doubleday: ISBN 9780857522450)
- A Snow Garden and Other Stories (2015, Doubleday: ISBN 978-0857523532)
- The Music Shop (2017, Doubleday: ISBN 978-0857521927)
- Miss Benson's Beetle (11 June 2020, Penguin: ISBN 9780857521989)
- Maureen Fry and the Angel of the North (20 October 2022, Doubleday: ISBN 978-0-85752-900-8)
- Lady of Lincoln (2026, Hedgehog Books ISBN 978-1-9193379-0-6)
- Lady of the Castle (2026, Hedgehog Books ISBN 978-1-9193379-5-1)

== Theatre ==
- The Unlikely Pilgrimage of Harold Fry (book of stage musical, based on the novel) - opened in May 2025 at Minerva Theatre, Chichester

== Awards ==
- Tinniswood Award, 2007 (joint award), for To Be A Pilgrim
- French Literary Award ("Prix Littéraire des Jeunes Européens, 2014 France) for The Unlikely Pilgrimage of Harold Fry
- Wilbur Smith Adventure Writing Prize, 2021, for Miss Benson's Beetle
