= Whispers II =

Studio album by Passenger
- Released: 20 April 2015
- Recorded: 2014
- Genres: Indie pop; Indie folk
- Length: 38:16
- Labels: Nettwerk; Black Crow
- Producers: Mike Rosenberg; Chris Vallejo

Passenger chronology
Whispers (2014)	Whispers II (2015)	Young as the Morning, Old as the Sea (2016)

Professional ratings
Review scores
Source	Rating
The Arts Desk	4/5 stars
PopMatters	(7/10)

Whispers II is the sixth studio album from British singer-songwriter Passenger, and is a sequel to his fifth studio album, Whispers. It was released on 20 April 2015 in different countries, through Black Crow Records. All profits from the album will go towards UNICEF UK. The album was produced by Mike Rosenberg and Chris Vallejo.

== Background ==
In March 2015 Passenger announced details of his sixth studio album, confirming the UK release date as 20 April 2015. He also announced that all profits from the album will go towards UNICEF UK’s initiative in Liberia. Talking about working with UNICEF, he said, "It's so exciting to be able to work with Unicef on such an important campaign. Money raised from these sales will go directly towards food and supplements to help bring severely malnourished kids back to health, facility upgrades and maintenance, education and training for health workers in the region."

== Track listing ==
All tracks were written by Mike Rosenberg.

Disc One
No.	Title	Length
1.	"Fear of Fear"	2:58
2.	"Catch in the Dark"	3:28
3.	"A Thousand Matches"	3:45
4.	"I'll Be Your Man"	3:11
5.	"Travelling Alone"	5:04
6.	"David"	4:30
7.	"Words"	4:12
8.	"The Way That I Need You"	3:31
9.	"Strangers"	3:53
10.	"Nothing's Changed"	3:44

Deluxe edition disc Two
No.	Title	Length
1.	"Two Hands" (Acoustic)	2:36
2.	"Stolen Toys" (Acoustic)	3:46
3.	"The Way It Goes" (Acoustic)	2:16
4.	"Settled" (Acoustic)	5:05
5.	"Timber and Coal" (Acoustic)	2:28
6.	"Darkest Days" (Acoustic)	2:57

== Charts ==
Chart (2015)	Peak position
Australian Albums (ARIA)	17
Belgian Albums (Ultratop Flanders)	86
Belgian Albums (Ultratop Wallonia)	149
Canadian Albums (Billboard)	15
Dutch Albums (Album Top 100)	63
Irish Albums (IRMA)	49
New Zealand Albums (RMNZ)	30
Scottish Albums (Official Charts)	12
UK Albums (Official Charts)	12
UK Independent Albums (Official Charts)	2
US Americana/Folk Albums (Billboard)	8

== Release history ==
Region	Date	Label	Format
United Kingdom	20 April 2015	Black Crow	CD; digital download; and Vinyl
