= Young as the Morning, Old as the Sea =

Young as the Morning Old as the Sea

Studio album by Passenger
- Released: 23 September 2016
- Recorded: 2015–16
- Studio: Linear Recording Studios, Sydney, Australia; Roundhead Studios, Auckland, New Zealand; Black Crow Studios, Brighton, United Kingdom
- Genre: Country; folk rock; indie folk
- Length: 41:51
- Label: Nettwerk; Black Crow; Cooking Vinyl
- Producer: Mike Rosenberg; Chris Vallejo

Passenger chronology
Whispers II (2015)	Young as the Morning Old as the Sea (2016)	Sunday Night Sessions (2017)

Passenger studio album chronology
Whispers II (2015)	Young as the Morning Old as the Sea (2016)	The Boy Who Cried Wolf (2017)

Singles from Young as the Morning Old as the Sea
- 1. "Somebody's Love" Released: 17 June 2016; 2. "Anywhere" Released: 19 August 2016

Young as the Morning Old as the Sea is the seventh studio album by Passenger. It was released on 23 September 2016 on Black Crow Records. It topped the charts in the UK and other countries. A deluxe edition was released containing six additional acoustic versions of songs appearing on the album. The album was produced by Chris Vallejo and Mike Rosenberg.

== Background ==
On 17 June 2016, Passenger announced details of his seventh studio album on Facebook, confirming that the album would be released in September 2016. He also announced that the deluxe version of the album would include a documentary and some acoustic bonus tracks. The landscapes in both New Zealand and on a trip Passenger took in Iceland lent inspiration to the creation of a newly panoramic album, with themes of relationships and the passing of time that are at once personal and universal. The album was recorded in Australia, New Zealand and United Kingdom. Canadian group The Once, who joined Rosenberg on his Whispers tour, contributed backing vocals on the album.

== Singles ==
"Somebody's Love" was released as the lead single from the album on 17 June 2016. "Anywhere" was released as the second single from the album on 19 August 2016. The song has peaked at number 43 on the Australian Singles Chart. "Young As The Morning, Old As The Sea" was used as a part of the official soundtrack for the 2017 German movie Windstorm 3: Windstorm and the Wild Horses; in particular this single was used as a background music for the last scenes of the film and for the end credits.

== Critical reception ==
Professional ratings
Review scores
Source	Rating
AllMusic	4/5 stars
London Evening Standard	3/5 stars
Pop Magazine	4.5/5 stars
The Guardian	2/5 stars
The Irish Times	2/5 stars

Young as the Morning Old as the Sea has received generally mixed to negative reviews from critics. Reviewing for AllMusic, Matt Collar commented, "Ultimately, with Young as the Morning Old as the Sea, Passenger has crafted an album that, not unlike the oceans, fields, roads, and relationships that inspired it, remains with you, calling you to return." David Smyth of the London Evening Standard wrote, "As Passenger, the solo artist achieved a slow-burning worldwide hit with his pretty break-up song Let Her Go, and has followed it with similarly tasteful fare. Here his piano duet with Birdy, Beautiful Birds, and the gentle guitar ballad The Long Road, are pleasant but forgettable. Rosenberg’s voice is meek throughout, even when he has a powerful band to sing over on Home. The Paul Simon-style jangle of Anywhere and lively horns of If You Go provide the most entertaining backdrops for songs that too often stray towards blandness."

Reviewing for The Guardian, Chris Owen said, "It’s a struggle to believe, while wading through his seventh studio album, that Passenger was responsible for Let Her Go, the song most of Britain spent six months humming in 2012. There isn’t a single singalong number trying to set up camp in your temporal lobe on Young As the Morning Old As the Sea – it seems that in his hurry to vacate the trodden ground of campfire pop, Michael Rosenberg hasn’t really planned where to go. Most of the songs here are almost identical, and the ones that manage to stand out are perfectly fine jaunts into well-cultivated sonic territories. The collaboration with Birdy is nice enough, as are the old fashioned trad-folk sounds of Everything – and that’s the thing: it’s all nice. All this from the man who used to run rings around your brain." Lauren Murphy of The Irish Times wrote, "His “If it ain’t broke, don’t fix it” approach means that songs such as Everything and Fool’s Gold lumber pleasantly but forgettably along, while the addition of Birdy on vapid duet Beautiful Birds makes scant difference. Anywhere and If You Go are perkier affairs, but there is little in the way of “edgy” here, along with some criminally bad lyrical rhymes. Rosenberg remains a Passenger in all senses, allowing others to call the tune while he travels in their mind-numbingly ordinary wake."

=== Accolades ===
Year	Organization	Accolade	Artist/work	Ranking	Source
2016	Pop Magazine	Best Albums of 2016	Young as the Morning Old as the Sea	12	

== Track listing ==
All tracks were written by Mike Rosenberg.

Standard version
No.	Title	Length
1.	"Everything"	3:34
2.	"If You Go"	3:44
3.	"When We Were Young"	4:40
4.	"Anywhere"	3:36
5.	"Somebody's Love"	5:23
6.	"Young as the Morning Old as the Sea"	3:26
7.	"Beautiful Birds" (featuring Birdy)	3:33
8.	"The Long Road"	3:52
9.	"Fool's Gold"	4:15
10.	"Home"	5:48

Deluxe edition
No.	Title	Length
11.	"Young as the Morning Old as the Sea" (acoustic)	2:36
12.	"Fool's Gold" (acoustic)	3:23
13.	"Beautiful Birds" (acoustic)	2:53
14.	"Everything" (acoustic)	3:18
15.	"The Long Road" (acoustic)	3:08
16.	"When We Were Young" (acoustic)	3:37

== Charts ==
=== Weekly charts ===
Chart (2016–17)	Peak position
Australian Albums (ARIA)	1
Austrian Albums (Ö3 Austria)	8
Belgian Albums (Ultratop Flanders)	7
Belgian Albums (Ultratop Wallonia)	22
Canadian Albums (Billboard)	8
Dutch Albums (Album Top 100)	7
French Albums (SNEP)	10
German Albums (Offizielle Top 100)	6
Irish Albums (IRMA)	5
Italian Albums (FIMI)	31
New Zealand Albums (RMNZ)	1
Norwegian Albums (VG-lista)	28
Scottish Albums (OCC)	2
Spanish Albums (PROMUSICAE)	32
Swedish Albums (Sverigetopplistan)	54
Swiss Albums (Schweizer Hitparade)	1
UK Albums (OCC)	1
UK Album Downloads (OCC)	1
UK Independent Albums (OCC)	1
US Billboard 200	70
US Top Rock Albums (Billboard)	9

=== Year-end charts ===
Chart (2016)	Position
Belgian Albums (Ultratop Flanders)	172
Swiss Albums (Schweizer Hitparade)	86

== See also ==
- List of number-one albums of 2016 (Australia)
- List of number-one albums from the 2010s (New Zealand)
- List of UK Albums Chart number ones of the 2010s

== Release history ==
Region	Release date	Format	Label
United Kingdom; United States	23 September 2016	Digital download; CD; Vinyl	Nettwerk; Black Crow
