= Eden Reforestation Projects =

Non-governmental organization

Eden: People+Planet
- Logo used under the former name Eden Reforestation Projects
- Founded: 2005
- Type: Non-governmental organization/NGO
- Purpose: Nature-based solutions to climate change, sustainable community development, forest landscape restoration
- Key people: Bryan Adkins - CEO
- Website: edenprojects.org

Eden: People+Planet (formerly Eden Reforestation Projects) is a nonprofit NGO that works in developing countries to rebuild natural landscapes destroyed by deforestation. Eden works directly with communities experiencing extreme poverty resulting from the deforestation and destruction of the land that sustains them. The organization employs thousands of local community members and provides them with the education and tools necessary to plant, grow, and protect to maturity, millions of trees each year. Eden currently plants approximately 15 million trees a month, and in 2020 reached over 423 million trees planted of which over 225 million are mangrove trees.

== Mission and history ==
In the fall of 2005, Ethiopia's then President of the Southern Nations Hailemariam Desalegn invited Dr. Stephen Fitch to help run an abandoned nursery and forest restoration project along the Udo Escarpment near Hawassa, Ethiopia. Fitch accepted the Prime Minister's offer and began to develop and implement what would eventually become Eden's Employ to Plant methodology: provide sustainable employment to local people to restore and protect their natural environment. Locals at Gallo Argesi were hired as the workforce, and within the first year of operation, over 200,000 trees were planted. By the end of the project in 2012, 16 million trees had been planted by over 3,500 Eden staff. Its international efforts have since expanded into other continents and developing countries. Nurseries and reforestation projects with locally hired employees have been established in Madagascar, Mozambique, Kenya, Ethiopia, Nepal, Indonesia, the Philippines, Haiti, Central America, and Brazil. Since its establishment, Eden has planted over 977 million trees across its project sites. On June 13, 2024, the NGO announced it had changed its name to Eden: People+Planet to " better represent the work [...] and align with industry growth and advancements".

== Methodology ==
Eden is defined by its approach to engaging local communities in planting, maintaining, and guarding new forests. The process begins with communicating with government officials and local communities and prioritizing community needs. This encourages ongoing commitment to restoring and protecting the forests to protect their own livelihoods. The local community members are then hired to collect seeds, start nurseries, plant trees, and guard the newly emerged forests. Eden employs locals at a fair wage that is consistent with their economy. These workers are almost always from the ranks of the unemployed. The steady source of income helps them provide for their families, send their children to school, and participate and stimulate the local economy.

Eden focuses on planting native species. The emerging native species forests provide a habitat for wildlife, purify the water, control flooding, and erosion, and replenish the soil. Eden also prioritizes 10% of the trees to be agroforestry species. The agroforestry species are specifically intended for long-term sustainable community use. The community members benefit directly from the food, and the trees provide lumber and a fuel source. These same trees also help to reduce the cutting down of the newly restored forests and protected areas.

Recognizing that these new forests are vulnerable, Eden constructs guard towers at planting sites. Local community members are hired to serve as guards – a practice that has enabled more community members to have gainful employment and ongoing investment in the preservation and maintenance of their forests. Protection of the forests has expanded beyond the newly planted forests; in some areas, Eden also protects vital remnant forests that are in danger of being cut down.

Eden's growing success is partly defined by its cost-effective practices. By working in developing nations, hiring local people, and maintaining a simple approach to planting, Eden Projects keeps its overhead costs consistently low, with a price of 0.15 to 0.33 US cents per tree.

== Verification process and survival rate ==
Eden monitors and verifies the progress of its newly planted forest restoration sites. The sites' GPS coordinates are mapped and recorded as a polygon. Photo and video recordings are taken to capture the before, during, and after stages of site planting progress. When possible, Eden uses satellite imagery and drone surveys to provide larger-scale images of planting sites. Each site undergoes an ongoing in-person verification process with trained personnel creating detailed field studies to record tree survival rates, growth rates, and species diversity.

In-person surveys conducted several years after the original planting have demonstrated the challenge in identifying which trees were planted by Eden Projects and which trees naturally regenerated. In Madagascar, Indonesia, and Mozambique, the initial survival rate of mangrove trees planted at restoration projects exceeds 80%. After the first few years, the newly planted mangrove trees began to produce and drop propagules, resulting in a proliferation of natural regeneration. In Nepal, the survival rates are following a similar pattern. The phenomena associated with natural regeneration has dramatically enhanced Eden's original planting numbers.

== International impact ==
=== Ethiopia ===
With the second largest population in Africa, Ethiopia has been hit by famine many times due to drought and a depletion of natural resources. The country has lost 98% of its forested regions in the last 50 years, largely due to villagers cutting down forests to cultivate crops on the land and produce charcoal for cooking and heating. Those practices had quickly turned productive land into desert, which led to an increase in poverty for the local communities.

Before and after images of Eden Projects' work in Ethiopia. Photo by Dr. Stephen Fitch.

Local villagers were hired to plant and care for trees at the Udo Three Hills Region and soon thereafter at a second Sidama Highlands site. After nine years, over 16 million trees were produced, planted, and protected at the hands of over 3,500 local village employees. Photographs taken before and after the reforestation show the complete transformation of the project sites from desertified land to healthy emerging forest.

The lessons learned in Ethiopia are what now defines the mission of Eden Reforestation Projects: provide a cost-effective process to alleviate extreme poverty through environmental stewardship. The success in Ethiopia led to Eden's expansion to other parts of the world, and new project sites are being explored in Ethiopia for opening in 2021.

=== Madagascar ===
Famous for its unique biodiversity and lush forests, Madagascar has some of the rarest animal and plant species on the planet. However, more than 90% of Madagascar's original forests have been destroyed, wreaking havoc not only on plant and animal life but also on the ability of the local people to live sustainably off the land and sea. Along the coast, entire mangrove estuaries have been cut down, leaving mudflats to wash into the sea and destroying once-productive fisheries. Many fishers have ended up in indentured servitude in order to survive.

In 2007, Eden Reforestation Projects formed a local workforce that began to restore mangrove forests in the Mahajanga area of Madagascar. Local villagers were hired to clear the estuary, collect massive numbers of propagules, sort them by species, then return to the estuary at low tide to begin planting. Less than a decade later, a thriving mangrove forest had developed. The successful restoration of the mangroves also initiated the return of a healthy aquatic ecosystem: wildlife such as shrimp, algae, and flamingoes have returned to the newly restored area.

Eden expanded its work to over 60 sites in the northwest. Beginning in 2012, dry deciduous forest restoration systems were added to the equation. By hiring additional local employees, an extensive infrastructure was created, including guardhouses, fire towers, and seed banks. Eden Projects has also developed a nursery and reforestation leadership training center that emphasizes practical training, where local nursery managers gain hands-on experience in seedling management and effective reforestation techniques. These managers then partner with local area villages, launch new seedling nurseries, and begin producing, planting, and protecting trees.

As of November 2020, Eden Projects reported that more than 360 million trees had been planted in Madagascar, with approximately 14 million additional trees being planted each month. The organisation also reported that its reforestation activities provided employment for thousands of local residents, supporting household expenses, children's education and the development of small businesses.

In 2018, Eden Projects began to manage 2 hectares (4.9 acres) of land within the city of Mahajanga as a conservatory for endangered wildlife. The Eden Nature Center was established, which enabled Eden Projects employees to rescue and rehabilitate rare tree species and vanishing animal species. Many of the animals were rehabilitated and then released into newly reforested areas as a means to repopulate the regions. The center also served as a community educational and research center.

In November 2024, Eden announced in an e-mail to donors that it had ended its partnership with the implementing partner in Madagascar. How Eden's decision would impact the various projects in which it had been involved in Madagascar was not specified.

=== Haiti ===
Once covered by dense forests, Haiti is now one of the most environmentally degraded countries on the planet. A mere 2% of its original forests remain, and the United Nations estimates that 30% of those remaining trees are being destroyed every year. Today the main cause of this deforestation is charcoal production, which is consistently increasing in Haiti because it depends on charcoal as its primary source of fuel. The consequences have been devastating: massively destructive hurricanes, landslides, soil erosion, and subsequent declines in agricultural productivity are now hallmarks of the island nation. Considerable losses in biodiversity have also naturally followed Haiti's deforestation, and the abject poverty experienced by over 50% of Haiti's population has been directly attributed to its environmental degradation.

In 2010, Eden opened nursery sites in four distinct provinces, including Jacmel, and began producing trees immediately. With a focus on agroforestry, Eden Projects partnered with Providence University to begin training the younger generations in environmental care. Agroforestry trees are distributed to schools across project sites, where teachers are trained in the skills needed to start small nurseries and grow the seedlings. Eden Projects' work in Haiti has been successful: within a few years, the trees planted have become thriving, sustainable school and community forests. Eden Projects has since expanded its Haiti program to include singling. The singling process – also known as Farmer Managed Natural Regeneration – focuses on restoring native Bayawonn trees that were cut down for fuel wood and charcoal. As a coppice species, the Bayawonn trees that were cut down did not die; instead, the tree stumps began growing into thorny, bushy shrubs. Through the process of singling (cutting away all but one or two trunks), the shrubs grow back into thriving trees, and a healthy canopy grows fairly quickly. Eden Projects' singling work in Haiti has resulted in diverse forests reemerging in areas that were once completely deforested and desertified.

Today over 1.5 million trees have been planted in Haiti, with about 300 local farmers employed. In 2020, Eden Projects work in Haiti expanded to the restoration of the nation's disappearing mangrove systems. Restoring the mangrove habitats is crucial for re-creating the buffer zone that offers protection from hurricanes and for restoring precious wildlife habitat, including coral reefs.

=== Nepal ===
Situated between India and China, Nepal is a country that was once widely covered by forests and rich in biodiversity. Today less than 30% of its forests remain. The consequences of this environmental degradation have been devastating for local populations. Millions of Nepalese who rely on the forest for subsistence and as a source of income are now caught in a cycle of impoverishment as they live with increased food and fuel scarcity, erosion and landslides, and lowland flooding.

In 2015, Eden Reforestation Projects opened two nurseries near the southeastern border with India. In partnership with Chitwan National Park and through the support of local leadership and Nepalese employees, Eden Reforestation Projects planted close to 400,000 seedlings in the first year. Within five years, many of the new trees had already reached heights of 20–30 feet. Ideal climatic conditions contributed to rapid tree growth and the establishment of a healthy canopy. This accelerated a natural regenerative system resulting in the return of a variety of species that had been absent for many years. A wide range of tree species have reappeared through natural regeneration, resulting in a robust forest.

Since 2015, Eden Projects has expanded its operations in Nepal to 25 different planting sites spread across geographic locations such as the mountainous region of Nawalparasi, the lowland Terai region, and grassland areas in the central region of the nation. More than 7 million trees have been planted at Eden Projects' sites in Nepal by 88 full-time employees and ~10,000 seasonal workers.

=== Indonesia ===
Comprising over 17,000 islands, Indonesia is one of the most biodiverse regions on the planet and home to about 23% of the world's mangrove forests. It's also consistently ranked in the top 3 countries for highest rate of deforestation. In the last 50 years, Indonesia has lost over 40% of its mangrove forests, affecting not only the environment and species that rely on them but also the communities that depend on this ecosystem for survival. This has particularly impacted native indigenous communities, who have long been without the economic resources needed to care for themselves and their families.

In 2017, Eden Reforestation Projects began working to restore mangrove forests in Indonesia. The local leaders on Biak Island had already recognized the urgent need for forest restoration and had independently launched a small-scale mangrove reforestation effort. Acknowledging that financial and other limitations made them unable to scale up their efforts, they partnered with Eden to initiate large-scale reforestation projects. Eden launched five project sites and hired a local workforce to start planting on Biak Island in Papua.

After one year, Eden's planting efforts exceeded initial expectations, with over 1.7 million trees planted by the local workforce. This made Indonesia the most productive first-year launch of any new project initiated by Eden Reforestation Projects. Since then, Eden Projects has expanded to other islands and the mainland of West Papua and has also begun to plant agroforestry trees that will provide food stability to the local people. As of November 2020, over 22 million trees have been planted across 10 project sites in Indonesia, and expansion has continued with the launching of new project sites and 1 million more trees being planted each month.

=== Mozambique ===
A former Portuguese colony located on the southeast coast of Africa, Mozambique is home to extensive biodiversity and unique landscapes, with forests that are critical to the country's social, environmental, and economic well-being. However, more than 8 million hectares – an area the size of Portugal – have been lost to deforestation. Human activities such as intense demand for firewood and charcoal, transforming forests into farmland, and commercial logging are the leading causes of this massive environmental degradation. The nation has also been severely impacted by the loss of its mangrove forests, which house diverse ecosystems, sequester large amounts of carbon, and create a natural buffer zone for severe storm systems. Deforestation in Mozambique has had devastating impacts on local communities, and today Mozambique is ranked as one of the world's poorest economies.

In 2018 Eden Reforestation Projects began exploring potential project sites near the capital of Maputo for reforestation and met with local villagers, who were hired to help restore their environment. A large area along the coast that had been completely stripped of its mangrove ecosystem was identified as the starting point, and with a seed source and a local workforce in place, the project was launched. Within the first three months, over 280,000 mangrove trees had been planted by the local workforce.

Eden Projects has since expanded efforts to additional sites that include terrestrial tree species in addition to mangrove species. As of November 2020, eight mangrove sites around the Maputo region are under active restoration management with over 17 million trees planted by Eden Projects in Mozambique.

=== Kenya ===
Located on the eastern coast of Africa, Kenya is a country famous for its diverse wildlife and wide range of forest types that have long supported its communities. Mismanagement of these forests in recent decades has led to massive environmental degradation; human activities such as logging, charcoal burning, and illegal settling to create farmland are some of the major factors of deforestation. Today only 7% of Kenya is covered by trees. As a result, the country has seen an increase in severe drought and extreme poverty.

In partnership with the Kijabe Forest Trust and the Sheldrick Wildlife Trust, Eden Reforestation Projects began working in two distinct regions of Kenya. The Kijabe Forest is located in the Great Rift Valley, where Eden Projects began implementing a vision of restoring a thriving afromontane ecosystem. These systems are subtropical regions that are critical for providing a reliable water supply, landslide protection, along with other essential systems for communities and wildlife. The Lamu County region is located on the coast of Kenya, where Eden Projects' work has focused on restoring mangrove and coastal forest habitats.

With the initial goal of producing 3 million trees within the first year of full operations, Eden Projects hired local leadership and villagers to produce a mix of native species trees. Planting began in March 2020 and in the first month, employees planted over 50,000 trees. Since then tree production efforts have scaled up, and Eden Projects has initiated plans to expand its work in Kenya by multiplying nursery and planting sites. By November 2020, over 2.4 million trees had been planted in Kenya.

=== Central America ===
Central America is a biodiversity hotspot with a wide range of ecosystems that include tropical, dry, montane, and mangrove forests. These forests are home to indigenous people and ecosystems with high numbers of endemic species. Despite having over 900 terrestrial and marine protected areas in the region, both the environment and people are under severe threat due to continued deforestation. And while still considered a resource-rich area, Central America has the largest number of people living in extreme poverty in the Americas.

In 2020 Eden Reforestation Projects began working with indigenous communities in Central America to launch reforestation programs in Honduras. In Honduras, Eden has developed a partnership with La Tigra National Park, a protected area with many types of ecosystems and forests as well as critically endangered species. Working with communities from Montana Grande, one of the most impoverished communities in the area, Eden staff have begun gathering bare roots to reforest native tree species. Several additional areas have been identified as potential planting sites, as well as 61 communities (with about 31,000 inhabitants) in the area that could work with Eden as the program expands. Eden plans to expand its reforestation work to include large-scale mangrove and agroforestry programs within Honduras.

Since launching planting sites in Honduras, Eden has planted over 3 million trees and is looking to expand into additional nations throughout Central America.

== Rating ==
As of November 2025, Charity Navigator gave Eden a score of 4 out of 4 stars (based on a rating of 94%). ImpactMatters rated Eden as a 5 out of 5 stars nonprofit based on data from 2017.
