= Runaway (Passenger album) =

Studio album by Passenger
- Released: 31 August 2018
- Recorded: 2017
- Studios: Abbey Road Studios, London; Black Crow Studios, Brighton; Linear Recording Studios, Sydney
- Genres: Folk rock; indie folk; country pop
- Length: 38:17 (Deluxe edition bonus disc 36:25)
- Label: Black Crow
- Producers: Chris Vallejo, Mike Rosenberg

Passenger chronology
The Boy Who Cried Wolf (2017)	Runaway (2018)	Sometimes It's Something, Sometimes It's Nothing at All (2019)

Singles from Runaway
- 1. "Hell or High Water" Released: 2018; 2. "Why Can't I Change" Released: 2018; 3. "Runaway" Released: 2018; 4. "Heart to Love" Released: 2018; 5. "Survivors" Released: 2018

Runaway is the ninth studio album by English singer-songwriter Passenger. It was released on 31 August 2018 on Black Crow Records. The album peaked at number 6 on the UK Albums Chart.

Professional ratings
Review scores
Source	Rating
AllMusic	4/5 stars
Americana UK	9/10
AMNplify	4/5 stars
Cryptic Rock	5/5 stars
Pop Magazine	4.5/5 stars
Thank Folk For That	4.5/5 stars

== Track listing ==
All tracks written by Mike Rosenberg.

Standard edition
No.	Title	Length
1.	"Hell or High Water"	3:41
2.	"Why Can't I Change"	3:11
3.	"Heart to Love"	3:17
4.	"Let's Go"	3:14
5.	"He Leaves You Cold"	3:21
6.	"Ghost Town"	5:13
7.	"Runaway"	3:15
8.	"Eagle Bear Buffalo"	3:25
9.	"To Be Free"	4:45
10.	"Survivors"	4:55

Deluxe edition bonus disc
No.	Title	Length
1.	"Survivors" (Live from Jedediah Smith Redwood State Park, CA)	4:42
2.	"To Be Free" (Live from Dauphin Rd, Vineland, NJ)	4:41
3.	"Eagle Bear Buffalo" (Live from Canaan Mountain Wilderness Area, UT)	3:27
4.	"Runaway" (Live from Joshua Tree National Park, CA)	3:22
5.	"Ghost Town" (Live from Michigan Theatre, Detroit, MI)	4:23
6.	"He Leaves You Cold" (Live from Unityville, PA)	3:23
7.	"Let's Go" (Live from Trough Rd, State Bridge, CO)	2:49
8.	"Heart to Love" (Live from a Rooftop in Manhattan, NY)	3:16
9.	"Why Can't I Change" (Live from Tahkenitch Landing Campground, Gardiner, OR)	3:15
10.	"Hell or High Water" (Live from Santa Monica Beach, CA)	3:07

== Charts ==
=== Weekly charts ===
Chart (2018)	Peak position
Australian Albums (ARIA)	7
Austrian Albums (Ö3 Austria)	29
Belgian Albums (Ultratop Flanders)	11
Belgian Albums (Ultratop Wallonia)	47
Canadian Albums (Billboard)	33
Czech Albums (ČNS IFPI)	76
Dutch Albums (Album Top 100)	9
German Albums (Offizielle Top 100)	15
Irish Albums (IRMA)	17
New Zealand Albums (RMNZ)	22
Scottish Albums (Official Charts)	3
Swedish Albums (Sverigetopplistan)	57
Swiss Albums (Schweizer Hitparade)	4
UK Albums (Official Charts)	6
UK Album Downloads (Official Charts)	3
UK Americana Albums (Official Charts)	1
UK Independent Albums (Official Charts)	2

=== Year-end charts ===
Chart (2018)	Position
Swiss Albums (Schweizer Hitparade)	100

== Release history ==
Region	Date	Label	Format
United Kingdom	31 August 2018	Black Crow	Digital download, CD, Vinyl
