= Whispers (Passenger album) =

Studio album by Passenger
- Released: 6 June 2014
- Recorded: 2013–14
- Genre: Indie pop; Indie folk
- Length: 41:58 (standard edition); 68:42 (deluxe edition)
- Label: Nettwerk; Black Crow
- Producer: Chris Vallejo; Mike Rosenberg

Passenger chronology
All the Little Lights (2012)	Whispers (2014)	Whispers II (2015)

Singles from Whispers
- 1. "Scare Away the Dark" Released: 28 March 2014; 2. "Heart's on Fire" Released: 14 April 2014

Whispers is the fifth studio album from British singer-songwriter Passenger. It was released on 6 June 2014 through Black Crow Records and Nettwerk. The album includes the singles "Scare Away the Dark" and "Heart's on Fire".

== Background ==
On 26 March 2014 Passenger announced details of his fifth studio album, confirming the UK release date as 9 June 2014. When speaking to Digital Spy about the album he said, "This is easily the most 'up' album I've ever made, it's quite cinematic. There are lots of big stories and big ideas. There are also some sombre moments about loneliness and death but hey, it wouldn't be a Passenger album without those." He released "Heart's on Fire" as the lead single from the album on 14 April 2014.

== Singles ==
"Heart's on Fire" was released as the lead single from the album on 14 April 2014. Talking to Digital Spy about the song he said, "Heart's on Fire' is a nostalgic song. It's about when the timing with someone isn't right, even though the person might be. And although you're not with that person at the time, there may be a moment in the future where the relationship makes more sense."

== Critical reception ==
Professional ratings
Aggregate scores
Source	Rating
Metacritic	63/100
Review scores
Source	Rating
AllMusic	3.5/5 stars
Blurt	3/5 stars
The Guardian	4/5 stars
The New York Times	(mixed)
Rolling Stone	2.5/5 stars

Whispers was met with a moderately positive reception from critics. At Metacritic, which assigns a normalised rating out of 100 to reviews from mainstream critics, the album received an average score of 63, based on 7 reviews, indicating "generally favorable reviews".

Caroline Sullivan of The Guardian gave praise to Rosenberg's "snaggle-toothed rasp" delivery throughout the record and the storytelling elements that invoke "characterful observations ("Bullets")" and "striking vignettes ("Riding to New York")". AllMusic editor Matt Collar gave the "Album Pick" title to the album, praising the instrumentals and lyrics concluding with, "Ultimately, with Whispers, Rosenberg has crafted an album of sweet, hummable anthems for tender-hearted troubadours everywhere." The New York Times music critic Jon Caramanica gave a mixed review of the album, saying that his voice "can be striking, even if its arsenal is limited," but found most of his lyrics were like a "teenager’s scribbled poems."

== Commercial performance ==
The album debuted at No. 12 on Billboard 200, No. 5 on Top Rock Albums, selling 18,000 copies in the first week. The album has sold 71,000 copies in the United States as of August 2016.

== Album cover ==
"Whispers" received a 2015 Grammy nomination for Best Recording Package. The art director, Sarah Larnach, was also the artist and designer on the album and credits Mike Rosenberg with creating the concept. "Whispers" is the third Passenger album cover created by Sarah Larnach.

== Track listing ==
All tracks are written by Mike Rosenberg.

No.	Title	Length
1.	"Coins in a Fountain"	3:04
2.	"27"	3:20
3.	"Heart's on Fire"	4:13
4.	"Bullets"	3:24
5.	"Golden Leaves"	4:07
6.	"Thunder"	2:25
7.	"Rolling Stone"	3:22
8.	"Start a Fire"	4:21
9.	"Whispers"	4:02
10.	"Riding to New York"	5:02
11.	"Scare Away the Dark"	4:38

Deluxe edition bonus tracks
No.	Title	Length
12.	"Heart's on Fire" (Acoustic)	3:56
13.	"Coins in a Fountain" (Acoustic)	2:49
14.	"Riding to New York" (Acoustic)	4:49
15.	"Start a Fire" (Acoustic)	3:56
16.	"Golden Leaves" (Acoustic)	4:03
17.	"Rolling Stone" (Acoustic)	3:27
18.	"Whispers" (Acoustic)	3:44

== Charts ==
=== Weekly charts ===
Chart (2014–16)	Peak position
Australian Albums (ARIA)	2
Austrian Albums (Ö3 Austria)	12
Belgian Albums (Ultratop Flanders)	8
Belgian Albums (Ultratop Wallonia)	26
Canadian Albums (Billboard)	2
Danish Albums (Hitlisten)	13
Dutch Albums (Album Top 100)	3
Finnish Albums (Suomen virallinen lista)	15
French Albums (SNEP)	106
German Albums (Offizielle Top 100)	6
Irish Albums (IRMA)	6
Italian Albums (FIMI)	39
New Zealand Albums (RMNZ)	3
Norwegian Albums (VG-lista)	14
Scottish Albums (OCC)	6
Spanish Albums (Promusicae)	23
Swiss Albums (Schweizer Hitparade)	5
UK Albums (OCC)	5
US Billboard 200	12
US Americana/Folk Albums (Billboard)	1

=== Year-end charts ===
Chart (2014)	Position
Australian Albums (ARIA)	71
Belgian Albums (Ultratop Flanders)	108
Dutch Albums (Album Top 100)	61
Swiss Albums (Schweizer Hitparade)	59
UK Albums (OCC)	95
US Folk Albums (Billboard)	21

== Release history ==
Region	Date	Label
United Kingdom	9 June 2014	Black Crow
