= List of number-one R&B/hip-hop songs of 2015 (U.S.) =

This page lists the songs that reached number-one on the overall Hot R&B/Hip-Hop Songs chart, the R&B Songs chart (which was created in 2012), and the Hot Rap Songs chart in 2015. The R&B Songs and Rap Songs charts partly serve as distillations of the overall R&B/Hip-Hop Songs chart.

== List of number ones ==
Key
†	Indicates best-charting R&B/Hip-Hop, R&B, Rap and Airplay singles of 2015

Issue date	R&B/Hip-Hop Songs	Artist	R&B Songs	Artist	Rap Songs	Artist	R&B/Hip-Hop Airplay	Artist	Refs.
January 3	"I Don't Fuck with You"	Big Sean featuring E-40	"Tuesday"	ILoveMakonnen featuring Drake	"I Don't Fuck with You"	Big Sean featuring E-40	"Tuesday"	ILoveMakonnen featuring Drake	
January 10	"I Don't Fuck with You"	Big Sean featuring E-40	"Tuesday"	ILoveMakonnen featuring Drake	"I Don't Fuck with You"	Big Sean featuring E-40	"I Don't Fuck with You"	Big Sean featuring E-40	
January 17	"I Don't Fuck with You"	Big Sean featuring E-40	"Tuesday"	ILoveMakonnen featuring Drake	"I Don't Fuck with You"	Big Sean featuring E-40	"New Flame"	Chris Brown featuring Usher and Rick Ross	
January 24	"I Don't Fuck with You"	Big Sean featuring E-40	"Tuesday"	ILoveMakonnen featuring Drake	"I Don't Fuck with You"	Big Sean featuring E-40	"I Don't Fuck with You"	Big Sean featuring E-40	
January 31	"I Don't Fuck with You"	Big Sean featuring E-40	"I Don't Mind"	Usher featuring Juicy J	"I Don't Fuck with You"	Big Sean featuring E-40	"I Don't Fuck with You"	Big Sean featuring E-40	
February 7	"I Don't Fuck with You"	Big Sean featuring E-40	"I Don't Mind"	Usher featuring Juicy J	"I Don't Fuck with You"	Big Sean featuring E-40	"I Don't Fuck with You"	Big Sean featuring E-40	
February 14	"I Don't Mind"	Usher featuring Juicy J	"I Don't Mind"	Usher featuring Juicy J	"Time of Our Lives"	Pitbull featuring Ne-Yo	"7/11"	Beyoncé	
February 21	"FourFiveSeconds"	Rihanna featuring Kanye West & Paul McCartney	"FourFiveSeconds"	Rihanna featuring Kanye West & Paul McCartney	"Time of Our Lives"	Pitbull featuring Ne-Yo	"7/11"	Beyoncé	
February 28	"FourFiveSeconds"	Rihanna featuring Kanye West & Paul McCartney	"FourFiveSeconds"	Rihanna featuring Kanye West & Paul McCartney	"Time of Our Lives"	Pitbull featuring Ne-Yo	"7/11"	Beyoncé	
March 7	"FourFiveSeconds"	Rihanna featuring Kanye West & Paul McCartney	"FourFiveSeconds"	Rihanna featuring Kanye West & Paul McCartney	"Time of Our Lives"	Pitbull featuring Ne-Yo	"7/11"	Beyoncé	
March 14	"FourFiveSeconds"	Rihanna featuring Kanye West & Paul McCartney	"FourFiveSeconds"	Rihanna featuring Kanye West & Paul McCartney	"Time of Our Lives"	Pitbull featuring Ne-Yo	"7/11"	Beyoncé	
March 21	"FourFiveSeconds"	Rihanna featuring Kanye West & Paul McCartney	"FourFiveSeconds"	Rihanna featuring Kanye West & Paul McCartney	"Time of Our Lives"	Pitbull featuring Ne-Yo	"Truffle Butter"	Nicki Minaj featuring Drake and Lil Wayne	
March 28	"FourFiveSeconds"	Rihanna featuring Kanye West & Paul McCartney	"FourFiveSeconds"	Rihanna featuring Kanye West & Paul McCartney	"Time of Our Lives"	Pitbull featuring Ne-Yo	"Truffle Butter"	Nicki Minaj featuring Drake and Lil Wayne	
April 4	"FourFiveSeconds"	Rihanna featuring Kanye West & Paul McCartney	"FourFiveSeconds"	Rihanna featuring Kanye West & Paul McCartney	"Trap Queen"	Fetty Wap	"Truffle Butter"	Nicki Minaj featuring Drake and Lil Wayne	
April 11	"Earned It"	The Weeknd	"Earned It"	The Weeknd	"Trap Queen"	Fetty Wap	"Trap Queen"	Fetty Wap	
April 18	"Earned It"	The Weeknd	"Earned It"	The Weeknd	"Trap Queen"	Fetty Wap	"Throw Sum Mo"	Rae Sremmurd featuring Nicki Minaj and Young Thug	
April 25	"See You Again" †	Wiz Khalifa featuring Charlie Puth	"Earned It"	The Weeknd	"See You Again" †	Wiz Khalifa featuring Charlie Puth	"Earned It" †	The Weeknd	
May 2	"See You Again" †	Wiz Khalifa featuring Charlie Puth	"Earned It"	The Weeknd	"See You Again" †	Wiz Khalifa featuring Charlie Puth	"Earned It" †	The Weeknd	
May 9	"See You Again" †	Wiz Khalifa featuring Charlie Puth	"Earned It"	The Weeknd	"See You Again" †	Wiz Khalifa featuring Charlie Puth	"Earned It" †	The Weeknd	
May 16	"See You Again" †	Wiz Khalifa featuring Charlie Puth	"Earned It"	The Weeknd	"See You Again" †	Wiz Khalifa featuring Charlie Puth	"Earned It" †	The Weeknd	
May 23	"See You Again" †	Wiz Khalifa featuring Charlie Puth	"Earned It"	The Weeknd	"See You Again" †	Wiz Khalifa featuring Charlie Puth	"Earned It" †	The Weeknd	
May 30	"See You Again" †	Wiz Khalifa featuring Charlie Puth	"Earned It"	The Weeknd	"See You Again" †	Wiz Khalifa featuring Charlie Puth	"Earned It" †	The Weeknd	
June 6	"See You Again" †	Wiz Khalifa featuring Charlie Puth	"Earned It"	The Weeknd	"See You Again" †	Wiz Khalifa featuring Charlie Puth	"Earned It" †	The Weeknd	
June 13	"See You Again" †	Wiz Khalifa featuring Charlie Puth	"Earned It"	The Weeknd	"See You Again" †	Wiz Khalifa featuring Charlie Puth	"Earned It" †	The Weeknd	
June 20	"See You Again" †	Wiz Khalifa featuring Charlie Puth	"Earned It"	The Weeknd	"See You Again" †	Wiz Khalifa featuring Charlie Puth	"Earned It" †	The Weeknd	
June 27	"See You Again" †	Wiz Khalifa featuring Charlie Puth	"Earned It"	The Weeknd	"See You Again" †	Wiz Khalifa featuring Charlie Puth	"Earned It" †	The Weeknd	
July 4	"See You Again" †	Wiz Khalifa featuring Charlie Puth	"Earned It"	The Weeknd	"See You Again" †	Wiz Khalifa featuring Charlie Puth	"Earned It" †	The Weeknd	
July 11	"See You Again" †	Wiz Khalifa featuring Charlie Puth	"Earned It"	The Weeknd	"See You Again" †	Wiz Khalifa featuring Charlie Puth	"Earned It" †	The Weeknd	
July 18	"See You Again" †	Wiz Khalifa featuring Charlie Puth	"Can't Feel My Face"	The Weeknd	"See You Again" †	Wiz Khalifa featuring Charlie Puth	"Earned It" †	The Weeknd	
July 25	"See You Again" †	Wiz Khalifa featuring Charlie Puth	"Can't Feel My Face"	The Weeknd	"See You Again" †	Wiz Khalifa featuring Charlie Puth	"Bitch Better Have My Money"	Rihanna	
August 1	"Can't Feel My Face"	The Weeknd	"Can't Feel My Face"	The Weeknd	"See You Again" †	Wiz Khalifa featuring Charlie Puth	"Bitch Better Have My Money"	Rihanna	
August 8	"Can't Feel My Face"	The Weeknd	"Can't Feel My Face"	The Weeknd	"Watch Me (Whip/Nae Nae)"	Silentó	"Bitch Better Have My Money"	Rihanna	
August 15	"Can't Feel My Face"	The Weeknd	"Can't Feel My Face"	The Weeknd	"Watch Me (Whip/Nae Nae)"	Silentó	"My Way"	Fetty Wap featuring Monty	
August 22	"Can't Feel My Face"	The Weeknd	"Can't Feel My Face"	The Weeknd	"Watch Me (Whip/Nae Nae)"	Silentó	"My Way"	Fetty Wap featuring Monty	
August 29	"Can't Feel My Face"	The Weeknd	"Can't Feel My Face"	The Weeknd	"Watch Me (Whip/Nae Nae)"	Silentó	"My Way"	Fetty Wap featuring Monty	
September 5	"Can't Feel My Face"	The Weeknd	"Can't Feel My Face"	The Weeknd	"Watch Me (Whip/Nae Nae)"	Silentó	"My Way"	Fetty Wap featuring Monty	
September 12	"Can't Feel My Face"	The Weeknd	"Can't Feel My Face"	The Weeknd	"Watch Me (Whip/Nae Nae)"	Silentó	"Planes"	Jeremih featuring J. Cole	
September 19	"Can't Feel My Face"	The Weeknd	"Can't Feel My Face"	The Weeknd	"Watch Me (Whip/Nae Nae)"	Silentó	"Planes"	Jeremih featuring J. Cole	
September 26	"Can't Feel My Face"	The Weeknd	"Can't Feel My Face"	The Weeknd	"Watch Me (Whip/Nae Nae)"	Silentó	"All Eyes On You"	Meek Mill featuring Chris Brown and Nicki Minaj	
October 3	"The Hills"	The Weeknd	"The Hills" †	The Weeknd	"Watch Me (Whip/Nae Nae)"	Silentó	"The Hills"	The Weeknd	
October 10	"The Hills"	The Weeknd	"The Hills" †	The Weeknd	"Hotline Bling"	Drake	"The Hills"	The Weeknd	
October 17	"The Hills"	The Weeknd	"The Hills" †	The Weeknd	"Hotline Bling"	Drake	"The Hills"	The Weeknd	
October 24	"The Hills"	The Weeknd	"The Hills" †	The Weeknd	"Hotline Bling"	Drake	"Hotline Bling"	Drake	
October 31	"The Hills"	The Weeknd	"The Hills" †	The Weeknd	"Hotline Bling"	Drake	"Hotline Bling"	Drake	
November 7	"The Hills"	The Weeknd	"The Hills" †	The Weeknd	"Hotline Bling"	Drake	"Hotline Bling"	Drake	
November 14	"Hotline Bling"	Drake	"The Hills" †	The Weeknd	"Hotline Bling"	Drake	"Hotline Bling"	Drake	
November 21	"Hotline Bling"	Drake	"The Hills" †	The Weeknd	"Hotline Bling"	Drake	"Hotline Bling"	Drake	
November 28	"Hotline Bling"	Drake	"The Hills" †	The Weeknd	"Hotline Bling"	Drake	"Hotline Bling"	Drake	
December 5	"Hotline Bling"	Drake	"The Hills" †	The Weeknd	"Hotline Bling"	Drake	"Hotline Bling"	Drake	
December 12	"Hotline Bling"	Drake	"The Hills" †	The Weeknd	"Hotline Bling"	Drake	"Hotline Bling"	Drake	
December 19	"Hotline Bling"	Drake	"The Hills" †	The Weeknd	"Hotline Bling"	Drake	"Hotline Bling"	Drake	
December 26	"Hotline Bling"	Drake	"The Hills" †	The Weeknd	"Hotline Bling"	Drake	"Hotline Bling"	Drake	

== See also ==
- Billboard Year-End Hot R&B/Hip-Hop Songs of 2015
- List of Billboard Hot 100 number-one singles of 2015
- List of Billboard number-one R&B/hip-hop albums of 2015
