= Billboard Year-End Hot R&B/Hip-Hop Songs of 2015 =

This is a list of Billboard magazine's Top Hot R&B/Hip-Hop Songs of 2015.

No.	Title	Artist(s)
1	"See You Again"	Wiz Khalifa featuring Charlie Puth
2	"Trap Queen"	Fetty Wap
3	"Watch Me"	Silentó
4	"The Hills"	The Weeknd
5	"Can't Feel My Face"	The Weeknd
6	"Earned It"	The Weeknd
7	"679"	Fetty Wap featuring Remy Boyz
8	"Hotline Bling"	Drake
9	"Post to Be"	Omarion featuring Chris Brown and Jhené Aiko
10	"G.D.F.R."	Flo Rida featuring Sage the Gemini and Lookas
11	"FourFiveSeconds"	Rihanna, Kanye West, and Paul McCartney
12	"Somebody"	Natalie La Rose featuring Jeremih
13	"My Way"	Fetty Wap featuring Monty
14	"Bitch Better Have My Money"	Rihanna
15	"Nasty Freestyle"	T-Wayne
16	"Only"	Nicki Minaj featuring Drake, Lil Wayne and Chris Brown
17	"I Don't Mind"	Usher featuring Juicy J
18	"I Don't Fuck with You"	Big Sean featuring E-40
19	"7/11"	Beyoncé
20	"Flex (Ooh, Ooh, Ooh)"	Rich Homie Quan
21	"Truffle Butter"	Nicki Minaj featuring Drake and Lil Wayne
22	"Classic Man"	Jidenna featuring Roman GianArthur
23	"All Eyes on You"	Meek Mill featuring Chris Brown and Nicki Minaj
24	"Blessings"	Big Sean featuring Drake and Kanye West
25	"No Type"	Rae Sremmurd
26	"Slow Motion"	Trey Songz
27	"Ayo"	Chris Brown and Tyga
28	"Tuesday"	ILoveMakonnen featuring Drake
29	"Hit the Quan"	iLoveMemphis
30	"CoCo"	O. T. Genasis
31	"Downtown"	Macklemore & Ryan Lewis featuring Eric Nally, Melle Mel, Kool Moe Dee and Grandmaster Caz
32	"Throw Sum Mo"	Rae Sremmurd featuring Nicki Minaj and Young Thug
33	"Be Real"	Kid Ink featuring Dej Loaf
34	"She Knows"	Ne-Yo featuring Juicy J
35	"Energy"	Drake
36	"Back to Back"	Drake
37	"Planez"	Jeremih featuring J. Cole
38	"Where Ya At"	Future featuring Drake
39	"Feeling Myself"	Nicki Minaj featuring Beyoncé
40	"Again"	Fetty Wap
41	"Jumpman"	Drake and Future
42	"Hot Nigga"	Bobby Shmurda
43	"Commas"	Future
44	"This Could Be Us"	Rae Sremmurd
45	"Know Yourself"	Drake
46	"All Day"	Kanye West featuring Theophilus London, Allan Kingdom and Paul McCartney
47	"Come Get Her"	Rae Sremmurd
48	"Beg for It"	Iggy Azalea featuring MØ
49	"R.I.C.O."	Meek Mill featuring Drake
50	"Comfortable"	K Camp

== See also ==
- 2015 in music
- Billboard Year-End Hot 100 singles of 2015
- Billboard Year-End Hot Rap Songs of 2015
- List of number-one R&B/hip-hop songs of 2015 (U.S.)
