= Billboard Year-End Hot Rap Songs of 2015 =

American music chart

This is a list of Billboard magazine's Top Hot Rap Songs of 2015.

No.	Title	Artist(s)
1	"See You Again"	Wiz Khalifa featuring Charlie Puth
2	"Trap Queen"	Fetty Wap
3	"Watch Me (Whip/Nae Nae)"	Silentó
4	"679"	Fetty Wap featuring Remy Boyz
5	"Hotline Bling"	Drake
6	"Time of Our Lives"	Pitbull and Ne-Yo
7	"G.D.F.R."	Flo Rida featuring Sage the Gemini and Lookas
8	"My Way"	Fetty Wap featuring Monty
9	"Nasty Freestyle"	T-Wayne
10	"Only You"	Nicki Minaj featuring Drake, Lil Wayne and Chris Brown
11	"I Don't Fuck with You"	Big Sean featuring E-40
12	"Flex (Ooh, Ooh, Ooh)"	Rich Homie Quan
13	"Truffle Butter"	Nicki Minaj featuring Drake and Lil Wayne
14	"All Eyes on You"	Meek Mill featuring Chris Brown and Nicki Minaj
15	"Blessings"	Big Sean featuring Drake and Kanye West
16	"No Type"	Rae Sremmurd
17	"CoCo"	O. T. Genasis
18	"Hit the Quan"	iLoveMemphis
19	"Downtown"	Macklemore & Ryan Lewis featuring Eric Nally, Melle Mel, Kool Moe Dee and Grandmaster Caz
20	"Energy"	Drake
21	"Throw Sum Mo"	Rae Sremmurd featuring Nicki Minaj and Young Thug
22	"Back to Back"	Drake
23	"Be Real"	Kid Ink featuring Dej Loaf
24	"Where Ya At"	Future featuring Drake
25	"Feeling Myself"	Nicki Minaj featuring Beyoncé
26	"Again"	Fetty Wap
27	"Jumpman"	Drake and Future
28	"The Night Is Still Young"	Nicki Minaj
29	"Hot Nigga"	Bobby Shmurda
30	"Fun"	Pitbull featuring Chris Brown
31	"Commas"	Future
32	"Know Yourself"	Drake
33	"Beg for It"	Iggy Azalea featuring MØ
34	"All Day"	Kanye West featuring Theophilus London, Allan Kingdom and Paul McCartney
35	"This Could Be Us"	Rae Sremmurd
36	"I Don't Like It, I Love It"	Flo Rida featuring Robin Thicke and Verdine White
37	"Comfortable"	K Camp
38	"Try Me"	Dej Loaf
39	"Antidote"	Travis Scott
40	"The Matrimony"	Wale featuring Usher
41	"L.A. Love (La La)"	Fergie
42	"White Iverson"	Post Malone
43	"Apparently"	J. Cole
44	"Wet Dreamz"	J. Cole
45	"R.I.C.O."	Meek Mill featuring Drake
46	"Anaconda"	Nicki Minaj
47	"Legend"	Drake
48	"How Many Times"	DJ Khaled featuring Chris Brown, Lil Wayne and Big Sean
49	"Black Widow"	Iggy Azalea featuring Rita Ora
50	"10 Bands"	Drake

== See also ==
- 2015 in music
- Billboard Year-End Hot R&B/Hip-Hop Songs of 2015
- Billboard Year-End Hot 100 singles of 2015
- List of Billboard number-one rap singles of 2015
