= Billboard Year-End Hot 100 singles of 2015 =

Ranking of recorded music

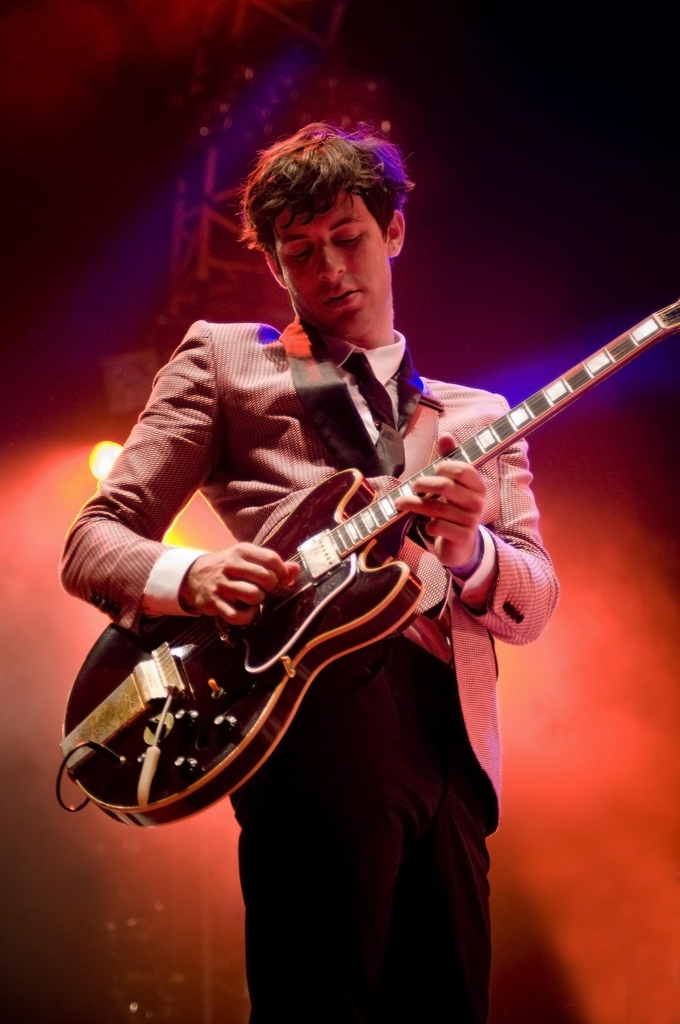
"Uptown Funk" by Mark Ronson featuring Bruno Mars came in at number one, spending a total of fourteen consecutive weeks at the top position of the Billboard Hot 100 during 2015.

The Billboard Hot 100 is a chart that ranks the best-performing singles of the United States. Its data published by Billboard magazine and compiled by Nielsen SoundScan, is based collectively on each single's weekly physical and digital sales, as well as airplay and streaming. At the end of a year, Billboard will publish an annual list of the 100 most successful songs throughout that year on the Hot 100 chart based on the information.

For 2015, the list was published on December 9, calculated with data from December 6, 2014, to November 28, 2015.

The funk track "Uptown Funk" by British producer Mark Ronson, featuring American singer Bruno Mars, who co-wrote and voiced the lyrics was named the number 1 song of 2015, despite being released in late 2014. It spent the longest time at number 1 for the year, 14 weeks, and spent the entire year in the Top 40 region. This is also the joint-fifth longest time at number 1 for a single in the history of the Hot 100 post-1958 inception, after Lil Nas X and Billy Ray Cyrus's "Old Town Road" (19 weeks), Mariah Carey and Boyz II Men's "One Sweet Day" and Luis Fonsi, Daddy Yankee and Justin Bieber's "Despacito" (16 weeks), and Harry Styles' "As It Was" (15 weeks).

== List ==
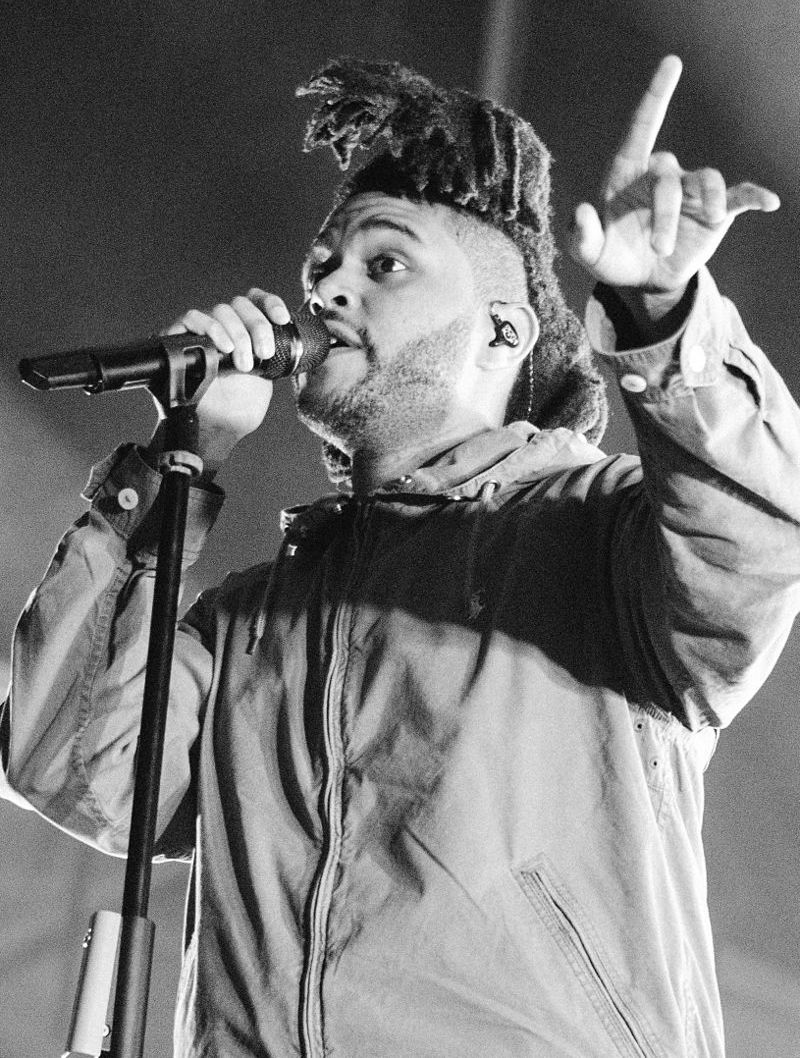
Four songs from The Weeknd appear on the list, with "Earned It" at number 9, "The Hills" at number 10, "Can't Feel My Face" at number 12, and "Love Me Harder" at number 56.

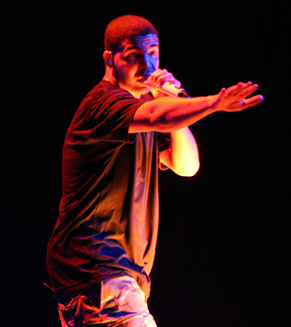
Drake has six songs on the list, the most of any artist. His highest-ranking single on the list is "Hotline Bling" at number 30.

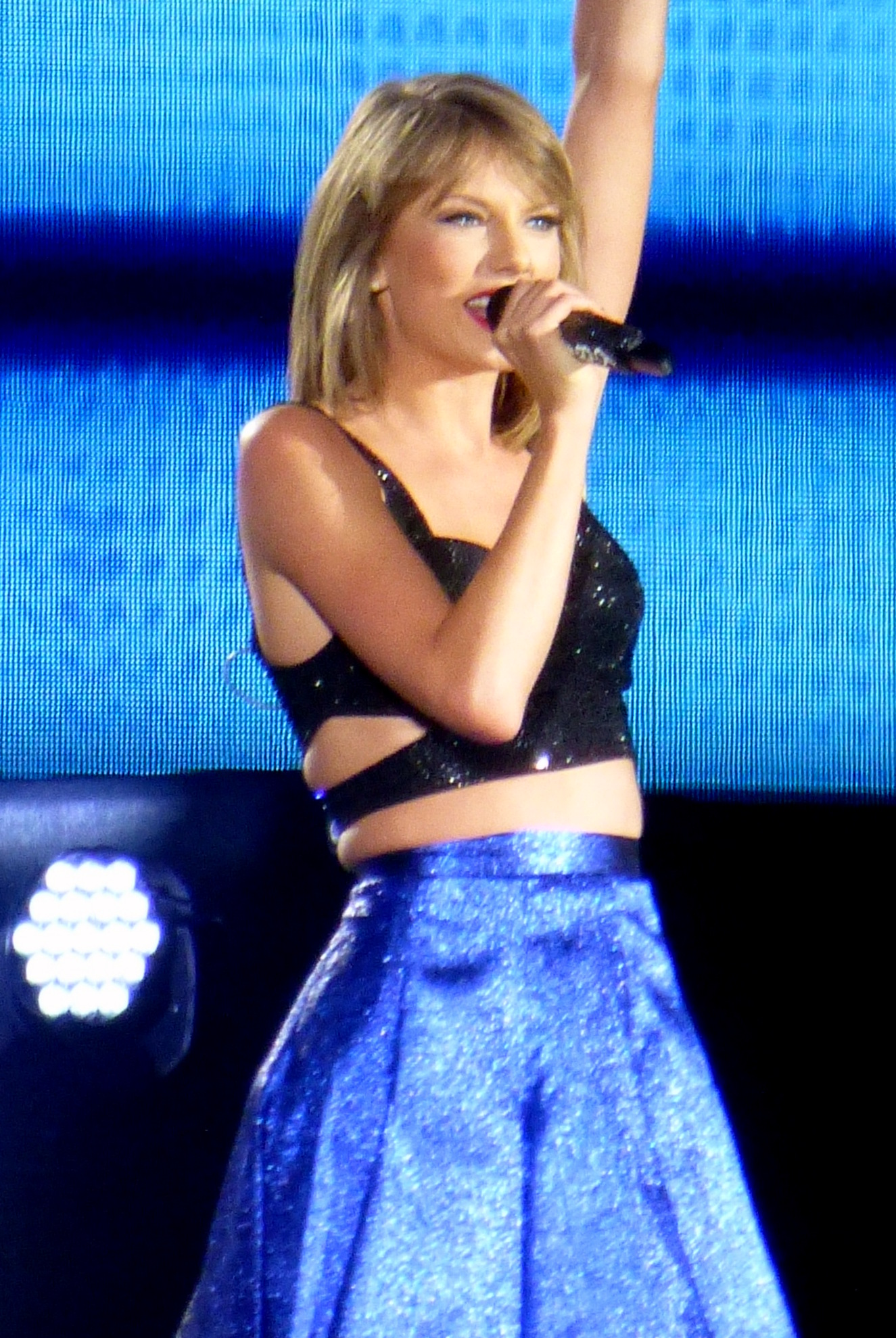
The first five singles from Taylor Swift's fifth studio album, 1989, are on the list. Four were in the top 30, of which "Blank Space" ranked the highest, at number 7.

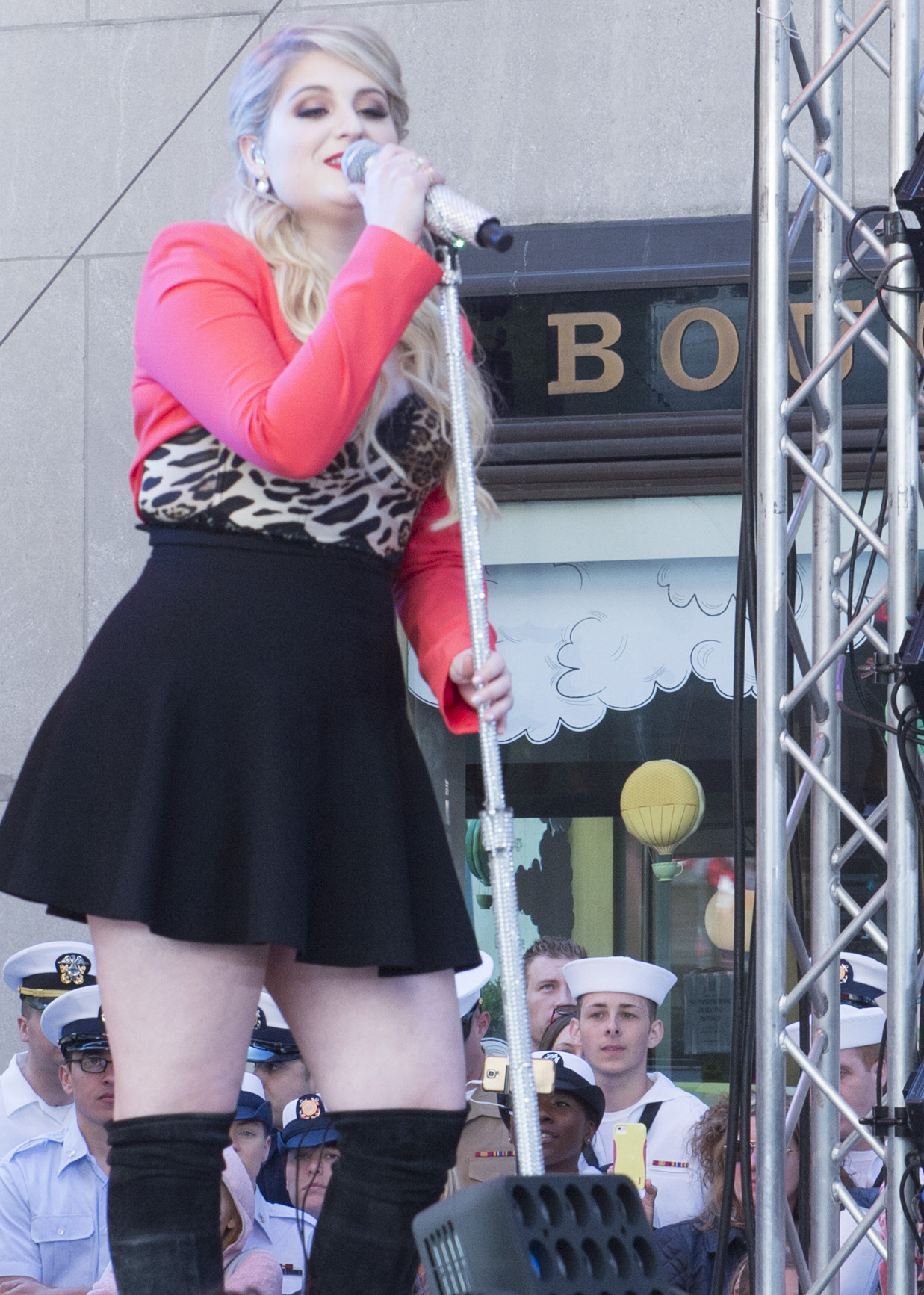
Meghan Trainor has five songs on the chart, four of which are from her debut album Title.

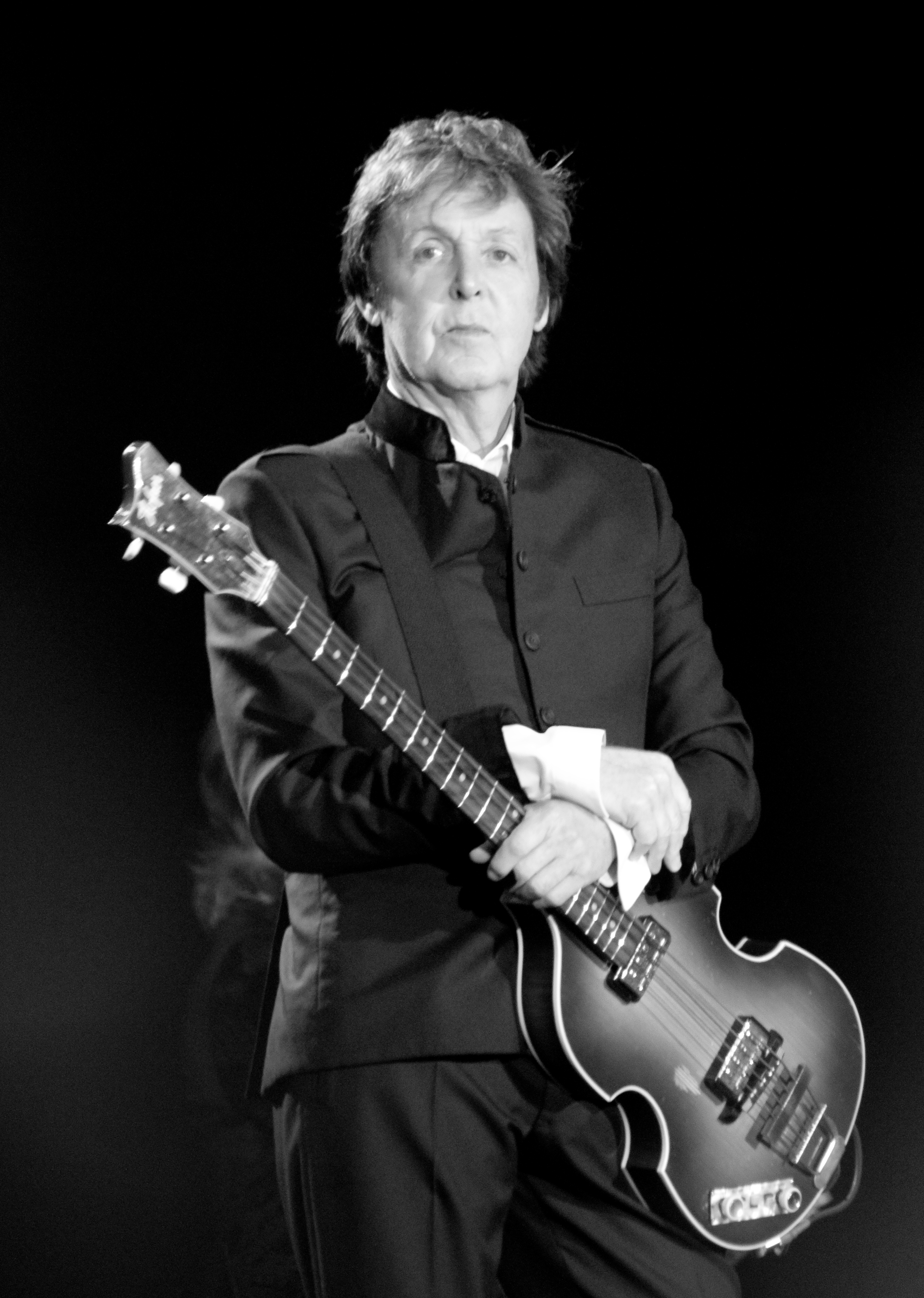
Paul McCartney makes his first appearance in the top 10 of the Billboard Hot 100 after 29 years with his collaboration with Rihanna and Kanye West on the song "FourFiveSeconds" (number 42), surpassing Santana's record of having the longest break between top 10 songs in the chart's 56-year history, (although The Ronettes would break this record in 2022).

List of songs on Billboard's 2015 Year-End Hot 100 chart
No.	Title	Artist(s)
1	"Uptown Funk"	Mark Ronson featuring Bruno Mars
2	"Thinking Out Loud"	Ed Sheeran
3	"See You Again"	Wiz Khalifa featuring Charlie Puth
4	"Trap Queen"	Fetty Wap
5	"Sugar"	Maroon 5
6	"Shut Up and Dance"	Walk the Moon
7	"Blank Space"	Taylor Swift
8	"Watch Me"	Silentó
9	"Earned It"	The Weeknd
10	"The Hills"	The Weeknd
11	"Cheerleader (Felix Jaehn Remix)"	OMI
12	"Can't Feel My Face"	The Weeknd
13	"Love Me Like You Do"	Ellie Goulding
14	"Take Me to Church"	Hozier
15	"Bad Blood"	Taylor Swift featuring Kendrick Lamar
16	"Lean On"	Major Lazer and DJ Snake featuring MØ
17	"Want to Want Me"	Jason Derulo
18	"Shake It Off"	Taylor Swift
19	"Where Are Ü Now"	Jack Ü featuring Justin Bieber
20	"Fight Song"	Rachel Platten
21	"679"	Fetty Wap featuring Remy Boyz
22	"Lips Are Movin"	Meghan Trainor
23	"Worth It"	Fifth Harmony featuring Kid Ink
24	"Post to Be"	Omarion featuring Chris Brown and Jhené Aiko
25	"Honey, I'm Good"	Andy Grammer
26	"I'm Not the Only One"	Sam Smith
27	"Good for You"	Selena Gomez featuring ASAP Rocky
28	"All About That Bass"	Meghan Trainor
29	"Style"	Taylor Swift
30	"Hotline Bling"	Drake
31	"Hey Mama"	David Guetta featuring Nicki Minaj, Bebe Rexha and Afrojack
32	"G.D.F.R."	Flo Rida featuring Sage the Gemini and Lookas
33	"What Do You Mean?"	Justin Bieber
34	"Photograph"	Ed Sheeran
35	"Hello"	Adele
36	"Stitches"	Shawn Mendes
37	"Talking Body"	Tove Lo
38	"Jealous"	Nick Jonas
39	"Time of Our Lives"	Pitbull and Ne-Yo
40	"Locked Away"	R. City featuring Adam Levine
41	"Somebody"	Natalie La Rose featuring Jeremih
42	"FourFiveSeconds"	Rihanna, Kanye West and Paul McCartney
43	"Centuries"	Fall Out Boy
44	"My Way"	Fetty Wap featuring Monty
45	"Take Your Time"	Sam Hunt
46	"Animals"	Maroon 5
47	"I Don't Fuck with You"	Big Sean featuring E-40
48	"Bitch Better Have My Money"	Rihanna
49	"Flex (Ooh, Ooh, Ooh)"	Rich Homie Quan
50	"Nasty Freestyle"	T-Wayne
51	"Only"	Nicki Minaj featuring Drake, Lil Wayne and Chris Brown
52	"Elastic Heart"	Sia
53	"Cool for the Summer"	Demi Lovato
54	"Renegades"	X Ambassadors
55	"I Don't Mind"	Usher featuring Juicy J
56	"Love Me Harder"	Ariana Grande and The Weeknd
57	"Wildest Dreams"	Taylor Swift
58	"Stay with Me"	Sam Smith
59	"You Know You Like It"	DJ Snake and AlunaGeorge
60	"Uma Thurman"	Fall Out Boy
61	"7/11"	Beyoncé
62	"The Heart Wants What It Wants"	Selena Gomez
63	"Girl Crush"	Little Big Town
64	"Slow Motion"	Trey Songz
65	"Drag Me Down"	One Direction
66	"Truffle Butter"	Nicki Minaj featuring Drake and Lil Wayne
67	"One Last Time"	Ariana Grande
68	"Chains"	Nick Jonas
69	"All Eyes on You"	Meek Mill featuring Chris Brown and Nicki Minaj
70	"No Type"	Rae Sremmurd
71	"Riptide"	Vance Joy
72	"Classic Man"	Jidenna featuring Roman GianArthur
73	"Ex's & Oh's"	Elle King
74	"Dear Future Husband"	Meghan Trainor
75	"Marvin Gaye"	Charlie Puth featuring Meghan Trainor
76	"Like I'm Gonna Lose You"	Meghan Trainor featuring John Legend
77	"Habits (Stay High)"	Tove Lo
78	"The Hanging Tree"	James Newton Howard featuring Jennifer Lawrence
79	"CoCo"	O.T. Genasis
80	"Bang Bang"	Jessie J, Ariana Grande and Nicki Minaj
81	"Lay Me Down"	Sam Smith
82	"Tuesday"	ILoveMakonnen featuring Drake
83	"Hit the Quan"	iLoveMemphis
84	"Downtown"	Macklemore & Ryan Lewis featuring Eric Nally, Melle Mel, Kool Moe Dee and Grandmaster Caz
85	"House Party"	Sam Hunt
86	"Ayo"	Chris Brown and Tyga
87	"Kick the Dust Up"	Luke Bryan
88	"Blessings"	Big Sean featuring Drake and Kanye West
89	"Budapest"	George Ezra
90	"Chandelier"	Sia
91	"Heartbeat Song"	Kelly Clarkson
92	"Don't"	Ed Sheeran
93	"Ghost"	Ella Henderson
94	"Here"	Alessia Cara
95	"Waves (Robin Schulz Remix)"	Mr Probz
96	"El Perdón"	Nicky Jam and Enrique Iglesias
97	"She Knows"	Ne-Yo featuring Juicy J
98	"Night Changes"	One Direction
99	"Back to Back"	Drake
100	"How Deep Is Your Love"	Calvin Harris and Disciples

== See also ==
- 2015 in American music
- Billboard Year-End Hot R&B/Hip-Hop Songs of 2015
- Billboard Year-End Hot Rap Songs of 2015
- List of Billboard Hot 100 number-one singles of 2015
- List of Billboard Hot 100 top-ten singles in 2015
