= Check (Meek Mill song) =

2015 single by Meek Mill

Single by Meek Mill

from the album Dreams Worth More Than Money
- Released: June 1, 2015
- Studio: Encore, Los Angeles, CA
- Genre: Hip hop
- Length: 3:14
- Label: Maybach; Atlantic
- Songwriters: Robert Williams; Leland Wayne; Joshua Luellen
- Producers: Metro Boomin; Southside

Meek Mill singles chronology
"Miss My Dawgs" (2015)	"Check" (2015)	"Fans Mi" (2015)

Music video
- "Check" on YouTube

"Check" is a song by American rapper Meek Mill from his second studio album, Dreams Worth More Than Money (2015). The song was produced by Metro Boomin and Southside, who served as co-writers with Mill. After Mill shared a preview on April 30, 2015, it was released as the album's lead single on June 1, through Maybach Music Group. A club number, it is reliant on three synth notes. In the lyrics of the song, Mill raps about heavy spending at nightclubs and his rise to the top.

"Check" received widespread acclaim from music critics, who mostly highlighted Mill's energy. Some praised the production, while a few critics saw the performance as among Mill's best. The song peaked at numbers 5 and 37 on the US Billboard Bubbling Under Hot 100 and Hot R&B/Hip Hop Songs charts, respectively. It was certified gold in the United States by the Recording Industry Association of America (RIAA). An accompanying music video was filmed in Philadelphia during June 2015, although a pistol-whipping on set led to it being shelved until February 21, 2017. In the video, Mill tries to make more money with his friends in the city and they also pass it around.

== Background and release ==
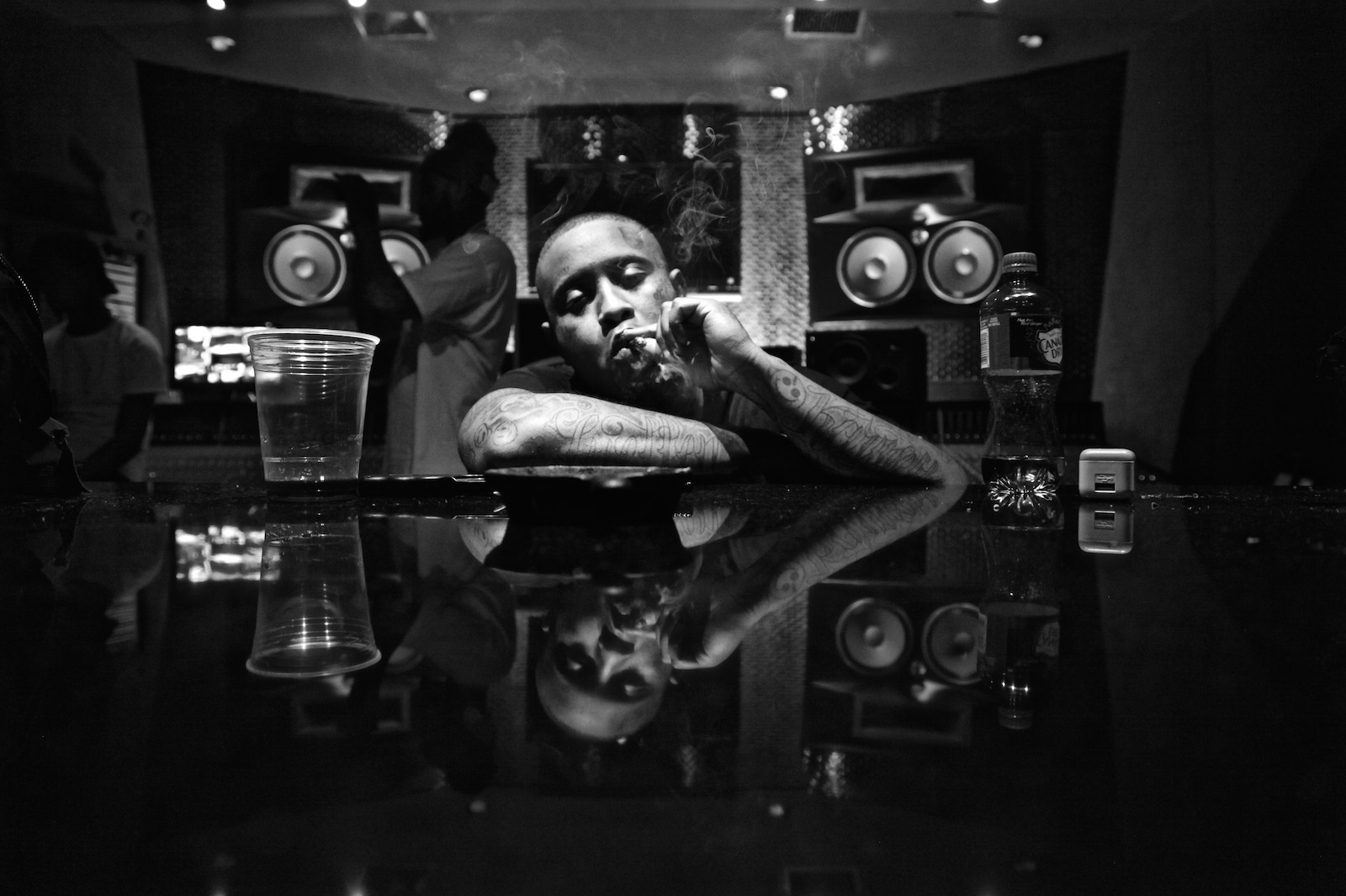
Southside contributed production to the song.

"Check" was produced by American record producers Metro Boomin and Southside, who co-wrote it with Mill. Outside of "Check", the two produced fellow Dreams Worth More Than Money track "Jump Out The Face"; their contributions differed from Mill's usual work with Jahlil Beats. Metro Boomin had previously produced rapper Young Thug's Mill-featuring track "Hundreds (I Had A Dream)" (2014). Mill teased "Check" with a 15-second clip via Instagram on April 30, 2015, featuring Metro Boomin and fellow rapper Travis Scott. On June 1, the song was premiered by DJ Funkmaster Flex.

The same day as its premiere, "Check" was released to radio by Maybach as the lead single from Dreams Worth More Than Money. Mill celebrated the radio release with a series of tweets. The song was released for digital download and streaming in various countries on June 4, 2015, through Maybach, distributed by Atlantic. Twenty days later, it was made available as an instant download for pre-orders of the album. On June 29, 2015, "Check" was included as the tenth track on Mill's second studio album Dreams Worth More Than Money.

== Composition and lyrics ==
Musically, "Check" is a club number. The song relies on three synth notes and features heavy bass, which is combined with soft piano. It also includes drums and cautionary air raid sirens, among other assorted sounds. According to Stereogum's Tom Breihan, Mill's vocals are "furious ranting".

Lyrically, "Check" sees Mill speaking about spending money endlessly at nightclubs and his road to the top. Mill demonstrates a mentality of being highly important, asserting he desires "the money, the respect and all the power". The rapper uses the line to acknowledge people in different positions, from youngsters starting from the bottom to those already making money. On the hook, Mill repeatedly yells "check".

== Reception ==
"Check" was met with widespread acclaim from music critics, who mostly praised Mill's energy. In HipHopDX, Marcus Dowling named the song as the album's best single, "intriguingly only" featuring Mill "screaming about how much he loves spending money" over the production and saw it as "popping 50 bottles at LIV in Miami on a Sunday night", marking its last instance of "the Mill that many of his diehard fans have come to enjoy". Writing for Consequence of Sound, Michael Madden picked the song as one of the best tracks on the album and called it a "head-rushe[r]" that is a "solo judder". At PopMatters, Joe Sweeney identified the song as a "relentless banger" showing "Meek in his element, rapping so hard" with heavy belief, when "even the instruments need to step off". Sweeney said the song has "a huge beat" alongside Mill creating a more orchestral feel than fellow album track "Lord Knows"; he also noted it is "more addictive" than the single "R.I.C.O.", "more necessary than the massive paydays of its title", and concluded that "drums are worth more than money". Complex's David Drake asserted that the song had already been "getting burn" and is "a strong single that coasts on a runner's high". Tom Breihan of Stereogum wrote that Mill shows his level of "internal energy" to simply yell one word repeatedly and "make it sound like a completely powerful hook" on the song, while describing the production as providing "a tense and ominous backdrop to Meek's furious ranting". Gregory Adams from Exclaim! labeled the song a "boom tune" that includes "brick-breaking beats, cautionary air raid sirens and other assorted sounds" in its production, while Mill is high energy on the "bands-stacking single".

For HotNewHipHop, Kevin Goddard wrote that Mill demonstrates his lyrical abilities and provides "a catchy new baller's anthem for the streets". Billboard reviewer Kris Ex declared that he "raps with the intensity of an aspirational corner boy and the mentality of kingpin". Elias Leight of The Fader branded it a "ferocious, imperious single" that is "bruising and low-slung", succeeding with a similar combination of "placid piano" and "booming bass" as rapper Future's 2015 songs "Trap Niggas" and "Fuck Up Some Commas". XXL's Aicha Jesal called the song a "club banger", seeing it as a "turn up track that makes you want to get crunk" like much of Mill's other work. Jesal 'Jay Soul' Padania from RapReviews saw the song as of a higher quality than earlier tracks on Dreams Worth More Than Money, such as "Ambitionz" and "Pullin' Up", and thought it would be quite appropriate as an album opener. In a lukewarm review, The New York Times critic Jon Caramanica pointed to the song as the nearest point to Mill's "familiar joie de vivre" on Dreams Worth More Than Money and commented that it succeeds moderately "at reproducing the tenor and vibe" of his 2015 single "Monster".

Upon the release of the album, "Check" reached number five on the US Billboard Bubbling Under Hot 100 chart for the issue dated July 18, 2015. Simultaneously, it entered the US Hot R&B/Hip-Hop Songs chart at number 39, before rising two places to number 37 the next week. The song lasted for three weeks on the chart. On December 6, 2019, "Check" was awarded a gold certification by the Recording Industry Association of America (RIAA) for pushing 500,000 certified units in the United States.

== Music video ==
In June 2015, the music video for "Check" was filmed in Philadelphia, directed by Spike Jordan. According to reports from the city, a fight broke out on the set and a man was pistol whipped during an altercation between Mill and fellow rapper Louie V Gutta's crews. The incident created media attention and abruptly ended the shoot, leading to the video being shelved. The music video was eventually released on February 21, 2017.

The music video begins with Mill and his friends hiding boxes of money inside and under a house, running out of places to hide it. After one of them touches the ceiling and money falls down, the scene transitions to the streets of Philadelphia. Mill and his friends appear there with the accompaniment of bikers, alongside shots of people engaging in activities across the city. His group do anything possible to make more money and they pass it around, using duffel bags. The scenes variate, showing Mill hiding the money and throwing it about. At the end of the video, Mill places money into a safe.

== Credits and personnel ==
Information taken from Dreams Worth More Than Money liner notes.

Recording

- Recorded at Encore, Los Angeles, CA
- Mixed at the Hit Factory Criteria, Miami, FL and Encore, Los Angeles, CA

Personnel

- Robert Williams – songwriter
- Metro Boomin – songwriter, producer
- Southside – songwriter, producer
- Fabian Marascuillo – mix engineer
- Sam Bohl – assistant engineer
- Anthony Cruz – additional engineer, recorded

== Charts ==
Chart performance for "Check"
Chart (2015)	Peak position
US Bubbling Under Hot 100 (Billboard)	5
US Hot R&B/Hip-Hop Songs (Billboard)	37

== Certifications ==
Certifications for "Check"
Region	Certification	Certified units/sales
United States (RIAA)	Gold	500,000^{‡}
^{‡} Sales+streaming figures based on certification alone.

== Release history ==
Release dates and formats for "Check"
Region	Date	Format(s)	Label(s)	Ref.
Various	June 4, 2015	Digital download; streaming	Maybach; Atlantic	
