= List of Billboard number-one R&B/hip-hop albums of 2015 =

This page lists the albums that reached number-one on the overall Top R&B/Hip-Hop Albums chart, the R&B Albums chart (which was re-created in 2013), and the Rap Albums chart in 2015. The R&B Albums and Rap Albums charts partly serve as distillations of the overall R&B/Hip-Hop Albums chart.

Note that Billboard publishes charts with an issue date approximately 7–10 days in advance.

== List of number ones ==
Key
†	Indicates best-charting R&B/Hip-Hop, R&B and Rap albums of 2015

Issue date	R&B/Hip-Hop Albums	Artist(s)	R&B Albums	Artist(s)	Rap Albums	Artist(s)	Refs.
January 3	The Pinkprint	Nicki Minaj	Black Messiah	D'Angelo & The Vanguard	The Pinkprint	Nicki Minaj	
January 10	The Pinkprint	Nicki Minaj	Black Messiah	D'Angelo & The Vanguard	The Pinkprint	Nicki Minaj	
January 17	The Pinkprint	Nicki Minaj	Black Messiah	D'Angelo & The Vanguard	The Pinkprint	Nicki Minaj	
January 24	SremmLife	Rae Sremmurd	Black Messiah	D'Angelo & The Vanguard	SremmLife	Rae Sremmurd	
January 31	The Pinkprint	Nicki Minaj	Reality Show	Jazmine Sullivan	The Pinkprint	Nicki Minaj	
February 7	B4.Da.$$	Joey Badass	Reality Show	Jazmine Sullivan	B4.Da.$$	Joey Badass	
February 14	Non-Fiction	Ne-Yo	Non-Fiction	Ne-Yo	The Pinkprint	Nicki Minaj	
February 21	Full Speed	Kid Ink	Non-Fiction	Ne-Yo	Full Speed	Kid Ink	
February 28	If You're Reading This It's Too Late †	Drake	Non-Fiction	Ne-Yo	If You're Reading This It's Too Late †	Drake	
March 7	If You're Reading This It's Too Late †	Drake	Love Sex Passion	Raheem Devaughn	If You're Reading This It's Too Late †	Drake	
March 14	Dark Sky Paradise	Big Sean	Non-Fiction	Ne-Yo	Dark Sky Paradise	Big Sean	
March 21	If You're Reading This It's Too Late †	Drake	Non-Fiction	Ne-Yo	If You're Reading This It's Too Late †	Drake	
March 28	Empire: Original Soundtrack from Season 1	Soundtrack	Empire: Original Soundtrack from Season 1	Soundtrack	If You're Reading This It's Too Late †	Drake	
April 4	To Pimp a Butterfly	Kendrick Lamar	Empire: Original Soundtrack from Season 1	Soundtrack	To Pimp a Butterfly	Kendrick Lamar	
April 11	To Pimp a Butterfly	Kendrick Lamar	Empire: Original Soundtrack from Season 1	Soundtrack	To Pimp a Butterfly	Kendrick Lamar	
April 18	The Album About Nothing	Wale	Empire: Original Soundtrack from Season 1	Soundtrack	The Album About Nothing	Wale	
April 25	Furious 7	Soundtrack	Empire: Original Soundtrack from Season 1	Soundtrack	Furious 7	Soundtrack	
May 2	Cherry Bomb	Tyler, The Creator	Empire: Original Soundtrack from Season 1	Soundtrack	Cherry Bomb	Tyler, The Creator	
May 9	Love Story	Yelawolf	Empire: Original Soundtrack from Season 1	Soundtrack	Love Story	Yelawolf	
May 16	If You're Reading This It's Too Late †	Drake	Empire: Original Soundtrack from Season 1	Soundtrack	If You're Reading This It's Too Late †	Drake	
May 23	Special Effects	Tech N9ne	Jackie	Ciara	Special Effects	Tech N9ne	
May 30	Bush	Snoop Dogg	Bush	Snoop Dogg	Special Effects	Tech N9ne	
June 6	Hollywood: A Story of a Dozen Roses	Jamie Foxx	Hollywood: A Story of a Dozen Roses	Jamie Foxx	If You're Reading This It's Too Late †	Drake	
June 13	At. Long. Last. ASAP	ASAP Rocky	Hollywood: A Story of a Dozen Roses	Jamie Foxx	At. Long. Last. ASAP	ASAP Rocky	
June 20	At. Long. Last. ASAP	ASAP Rocky	Hollywood: A Story of a Dozen Roses	Jamie Foxx	At. Long. Last. ASAP	ASAP Rocky	
June 27	At. Long. Last. ASAP	ASAP Rocky	Love Life	Tamia	At. Long. Last. ASAP	ASAP Rocky	
July 4	At. Long. Last. ASAP	ASAP Rocky	Love Life	Tamia	At. Long. Last. ASAP	ASAP Rocky	
July 11	Coming Home	Leon Bridges	Coming Home	Leon Bridges	At. Long. Last. ASAP	ASAP Rocky	
July 18	Dreams Worth More Than Money	Meek Mill	Wildheart	Miguel	Dreams Worth More Than Money	Meek Mill	
July 25	Dreams Worth More Than Money	Meek Mill	Wildheart	Miguel	Dreams Worth More Than Money	Meek Mill	
August 1	Black Rose	Tyrese	Black Rose	Tyrese	Dreams Worth More Than Money	Meek Mill	
August 8	DS2	Future	Black Rose	Tyrese	DS2	Future	
August 15	Woman	Jill Scott	Woman	Jill Scott	Southpaw	Soundtrack	
August 22	Woman	Jill Scott	Woman	Jill Scott	Professional Rapper	Lil Dicky	
August 29	Compton	Dr. Dre	Woman	Jill Scott	Compton	Dr. Dre	
September 5	Compton	Dr. Dre	Woman	Jill Scott	Compton	Dr. Dre	
September 12	Compton	Dr. Dre	Black Rose	Tyrese	Compton	Dr. Dre	
September 19	Beauty Behind the Madness	The Weeknd	Beauty Behind the Madness †	The Weeknd	Compton	Dr. Dre	
September 26	Beauty Behind the Madness	The Weeknd	Beauty Behind the Madness †	The Weeknd	Rodeo	Travis Scott	
October 3	Beauty Behind the Madness	The Weeknd	Beauty Behind the Madness †	The Weeknd	90059	Jay Rock	
October 10	What a Time to Be Alive	Drake and Future	Beauty Behind the Madness †	The Weeknd	What a Time to Be Alive	Drake and Future	
October 17	Fetty Wap	Fetty Wap	Beauty Behind the Madness †	The Weeknd	Fetty Wap	Fetty Wap	
October 24	Unbreakable	Janet Jackson	Unbreakable	Janet Jackson	What a Time to Be Alive	Drake and Future	
October 31	The Documentary 2	The Game	Unbreakable	Janet Jackson	The Documentary 2	The Game	
November 7	General Admission	MGK	Beauty Behind the Madness †	The Weeknd	General Admission	MGK	
November 14	Beauty Behind the Madness	The Weeknd	Beauty Behind the Madness †	The Weeknd	I Changed a Lot	DJ Khaled	
November 21	Beauty Behind the Madness	The Weeknd	Beauty Behind the Madness †	The Weeknd	Fetty Wap	Fetty Wap	
November 28	Beauty Behind the Madness	The Weeknd	Beauty Behind the Madness †	The Weeknd	Hamilton: An American Musical	Original Broadway Cast	
December 5	The Incredible True Story	Logic	Losing My Religion	Kirk Franklin	The Incredible True Story	Logic	
December 12	Top 5 Dead or Alive	Jadakiss	Beauty Behind the Madness †	The Weeknd	Top 5 Dead or Alive	Jadakiss	
December 19	Beauty Behind the Madness	The Weeknd	Beauty Behind the Madness †	The Weeknd	Fetty Wap	Fetty Wap	
December 26	When It's Dark Out	G-Eazy	Beauty Behind the Madness †	The Weeknd	When It's Dark Out	G-Eazy	

== See also ==
- 2015 in music
- List of Billboard 200 number-one albums of 2015
- List of number-one R&B/hip-hop songs of 2015 (U.S.)
