= List of Billboard Hot 100 top-ten singles in 2015 =

This is a list of singles that charted in the top ten of the Billboard Hot 100, an all-genre singles chart, in 2015.

During 2015, Mark Ronson's "Uptown Funk" (featuring Bruno Mars) spent 31 weeks in the top 10, becoming the single with the longest run in the top 10 of 2015 and the second longest running top 10 single of all time. Taylor Swift received five top 10 hits during the year, all from her fifth studio album 1989. The Weeknd and Justin Bieber followed her with four, with Fetty Wap and Meghan Trainor receiving three.

== Top-ten singles ==
Key

- ↑ – indicates single's top 10 entry was also its Hot 100 debut
- † – indicates best performing song of the year
- (#) - 2015 year-end top 10 single position and rank
- The "weeks in top ten" column reflects each song's entire chart life, not just its run during 2015.

List of Billboard Hot 100 top ten singles which peaked in 2015
Top ten entry date	Single	Artist(s)	Peak	Peak date	Weeks in top ten	References
Singles from 2014
November 29	"Jealous"^{[A]}	Nick Jonas	7	January 24	10	
December 13	"Uptown Funk" † (#1)	Mark Ronson featuring Bruno Mars	1	January 17	31	
December 27	"Thinking Out Loud" (#2)	Ed Sheeran	2	January 31	23	
Singles from 2015
January 31	"Sugar" (#5) ↑	Maroon 5	2	March 28	21	
February 7	"Centuries"	Fall Out Boy	10	February 7	2	
February 21	"FourFiveSeconds"	Rihanna, Kanye West and Paul McCartney	4	February 28	9	
February 21	"Love Me like You Do"	Ellie Goulding	3	March 7	15	
February 28	"Style"	Taylor Swift	6	March 21	9	
March 7	"Earned It" (#9)	The Weeknd	3	May 2	18	
March 14	"Time of Our Lives"	Pitbull and Ne-Yo	9	March 21	4	
March 28	"Lay Me Down"	Sam Smith	8	March 28	1	
March 28	"Trap Queen" (#4)	Fetty Wap	2	May 16	25	
April 4	"G.D.F.R."^{[E]}	Flo Rida featuring Sage the Gemini and Lookas	8	April 18	7	
April 11	"Somebody"^{[D]}	Natalie La Rose featuring Jeremih	10	April 11	2	
April 18	"See You Again" (#3)	Wiz Khalifa featuring Charlie Puth	1	April 25	19	
April 25	"Shut Up and Dance"^{[H]} (#6)	Walk the Moon	4	May 30	18	
May 9	"Want to Want Me"	Jason Derulo	5	June 20	9	
May 16	"Nasty Freestyle"^{[F]}	T-Wayne	9	May 16	4	
June 6	"Bad Blood"	Taylor Swift featuring Kendrick Lamar	1	June 6	13	
June 6	"Hey Mama"	David Guetta featuring Nicki Minaj, Bebe Rexha and Afrojack	8	June 6	8	
June 20	"Honey, I'm Good."	Andy Grammer	9	June 20	3	
June 27	"Cheerleader"	Omi	1	July 25	16	
July 11	"Can't Feel My Face"	The Weeknd	1	August 22	19	
July 11	"Watch Me (Whip/Nae Nae)" (#8)	Silentó	3	July 18	18	
July 11	"Good for You" ↑^{[G]}	Selena Gomez featuring ASAP Rocky	5	October 3	11	
July 18	"Where Are Ü Now"^{[I]}	Skrillex & Diplo with Justin Bieber	8	July 18	3	
July 18	"Fight Song"	Rachel Platten	6	August 29	9	
August 1	"Lean On"	Major Lazer and DJ Snake featuring MØ	4	August 29	10	
August 1	"The Hills"^{[G]} (#10)	The Weeknd	1	October 3	21	
August 8	"My Way"	Fetty Wap featuring Monty	7	August 8	4	
August 22	"Drag Me Down" ↑	One Direction	3	August 22	1	
September 5	"679"	Fetty Wap featuring Remy Boyz	4	October 31	15	
September 12	"Locked Away"	R. City featuring Adam Levine	6	October 3	10	
September 19	"What Do You Mean?" ↑	Justin Bieber	1	September 19	21	
September 26	"Photograph"	Ed Sheeran	10	September 26	1	
October 3	"Hotline Bling"	Drake	2	October 24	19	
October 10	"Wildest Dreams"	Taylor Swift	5	November 7	9	
October 17	"Stitches"	Shawn Mendes	4	November 7	18	
November 7	"Perfect" ↑	One Direction	10	November 7	1	
November 14	"Hello" ↑	Adele	1	November 14	18	
November 21	"Focus" ↑	Ariana Grande	7	November 21	1	
November 21	"Like I'm Gonna Lose You"^{[J]}	Meghan Trainor featuring John Legend	8	December 12	10	
November 28	"Ex's & Oh's"	Elle King	10	November 28	1	

=== 2014 peaks ===
List of Billboard Hot 100 top ten singles in 2015 which peaked in 2014
Top ten entry date	Single	Artist(s)	Peak	Peak date	Weeks in top ten	References
August 16	"All About That Bass"	Meghan Trainor	1	September 20	25	
September 6	"Shake It Off" ↑^{[B]}	Taylor Swift	1	September 6	24	
October 18	"Animals"	Maroon 5	3	November 22	14	
November 8	"Take Me to Church"	Hozier	2	December 20	20	
November 22	"Love Me Harder"^{[C]}	Ariana Grande and The Weeknd	7	November 22	7	
November 29	"Blank Space" (#7)	Taylor Swift	1	November 29	17	
November 29	"I'm Not the Only One"	Sam Smith	5	December 27	14	
December 20	"Lips Are Movin"	Meghan Trainor	4	December 27	12	

=== 2016 peaks ===
List of Billboard Hot 100 top ten singles in 2015 which peaked in 2016
Top ten entry date	Single	Artist(s)	Peak	Peak date	Weeks in top ten	References
November 14	"Sorry" ↑	Justin Bieber	1	January 23	21	
December 5	"Love Yourself"↑	Justin Bieber	1	February 13	24	
December 5	"Here"	Alessia Cara	5	February 6	11	
December 19	"Same Old Love"	Selena Gomez	5	January 30	9	

== Artists with most top-ten songs ==
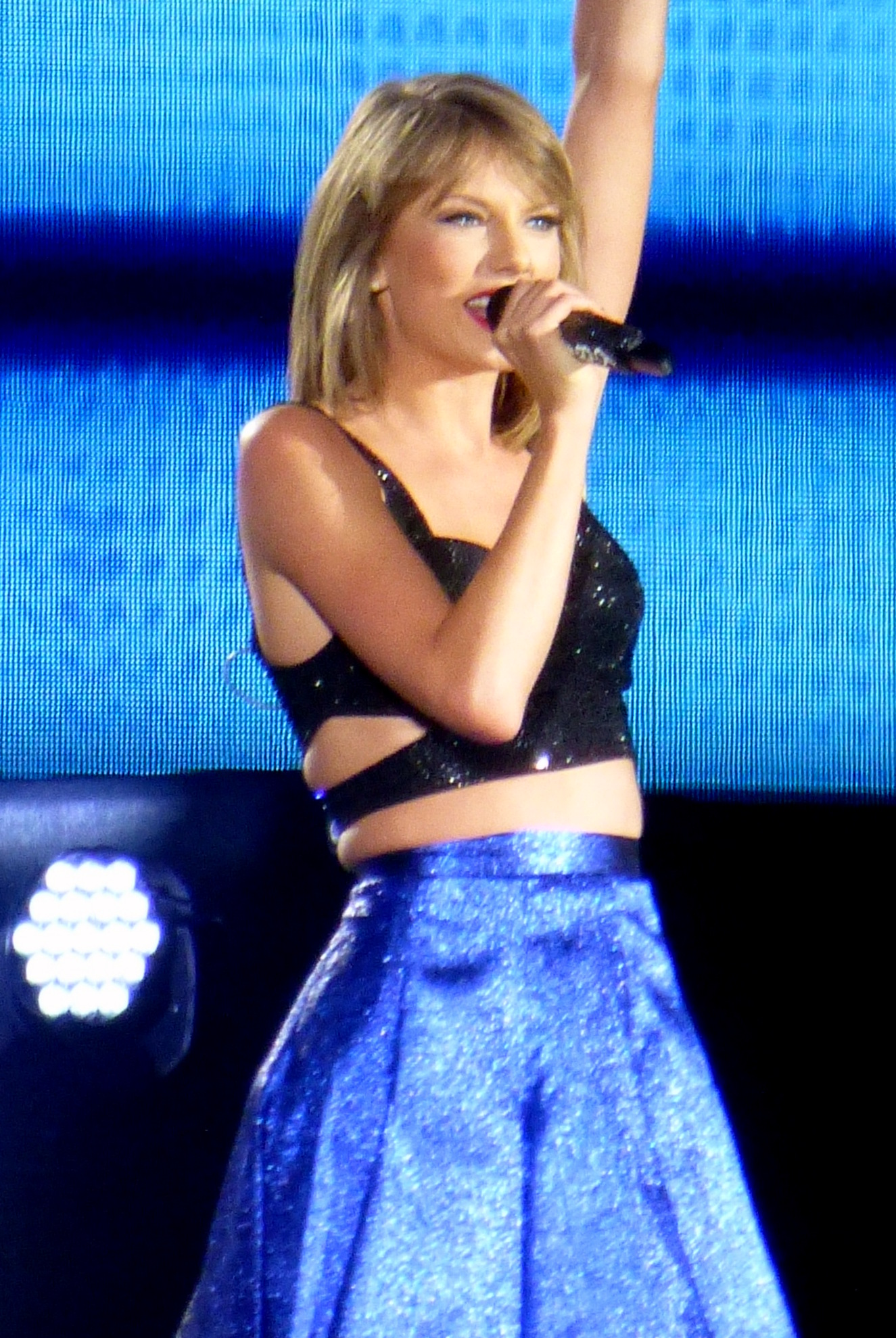
The first five singles from Taylor Swift's fifth studio album 1989 were in the top ten in 2015, giving her most top ten hits in the year.

List of artists by total songs peaking in the top-ten
Artist	Numbers of songs
Taylor Swift	5
Justin Bieber	4
The Weeknd	4
Fetty Wap	3
Meghan Trainor	3
Ariana Grande	2
Ed Sheeran	2
Maroon 5	2
One Direction	2
Sam Smith	2
Selena Gomez	2

== Notes ==
^{A} The single re-entered the top ten on the week ending January 3, 2015.
^{B} The single re-entered the top ten on the week ending January 10, 2015.
^{C} The single re-entered the top ten on the week ending January 24, 2015.
^{D} The single re-entered the top ten on the week ending May 2, 2015.
^{E} The single re-entered the top ten on the week ending May 23, 2015.
^{F} The single re-entered the top ten on the week ending May 30, 2015.
^{G} The single re-entered the top ten on the week ending August 29, 2015.
^{H} The single re-entered the top ten on the week ending September 5, 2015.
^{I} The single re-entered the top ten on the week ending September 19, 2015.
^{J} The single re-entered the top ten on the week ending December 12, 2015.

== See also ==
- 2015 in American music
- List of Billboard Hot 100 number ones of 2015
- Billboard Year-End Hot 100 singles of 2015
