= Dreams Worth More Than Money =

Studio album by Meek Mill
- Released: June 29, 2015
- Recorded: 2013 – 2014/2015
- Genre: Hip-hop
- Length: 54:19
- Label: Maybach; Atlantic
- Producer: Rick Ross; Allen Ritter; Alex Delicata; Mr. Bangladesh; Ben Billions; Boi-1da; Cardo; Carlo Montagnese; Cubeatz; DannyBoyStyles; Danny Morris; Danja; DJ Fu; DJ Khaled; Jahlil Beats; Kevin Cossom; Metro Boomin; OZ; Play Picasso; Remedy; Southside; Stoopid On Da Beat; Syk Sense; The Mekanics; The Monarch; Vinylz; Yung Exclusive

Meek Mill chronology
Dreamchasers 3 (2013)	Dreams Worth More Than Money (2015)	4/4 (2016)

Singles from Dreams Worth More Than Money
- 1. "Check" Released: June 1, 2015; 2. "All Eyes on You" Released: June 26, 2015; 3. "R.I.C.O." Released: June 29, 2015

Dreams Worth More Than Money is the second album by the American rapper Meek Mill. It was released on June 29, 2015, by Maybach Music Group and Atlantic Records. It was initially scheduled for release on September 9, 2014, however, it has been delayed few times due to Meek Mill's revoking of his probation on July 11, 2014, thus sentencing him to jail for three to six months. The album made its entry at number 1 on the US Billboard 200; and sold 246,000 album-equivalent units in its first week, with 215,000 coming from traditional album sales, marking as Meek's first number-one album on the chart. Due to the change in the tracking week by Nielsen Music SoundScan, its first week sales were counted towards its second week on the charts. At the 2016's Billboard Music Awards, the album won an award for Top Rap Album.

== Background ==
Meek Mill said that with this album, he is focusing more on rapping than on money. He said that rappers, especially in Philadelphia, have not received credit for helping their communities going on to state during his interview with XXL stating, that "If I’m in the position to help, I’m gonna help." Mill said that he has come to realize there is more to the music industry than wealth, a philosophy which resulted in the album's title, called Dreams Worth More Than Money.

Quentin Miller was not credited for his contribution to the song "R.I.C.O." Complex magazine reported that a YouTube video showed Miller recording his own vocal lines over the "R.I.C.O." instrumental tracks to serve as a reference for Drake who was the featured guest on the song. Complex was providing evidence to support accusations by Mill that Drake employed Miller as a ghostwriter. Miller denied being a ghostwriter, and Drake declined to comment.

== Promotion ==
In July 2014, Meek Mill released the trailer for the album. On May 10, 2015, Meek Mill released the statement the album track list has been finalized. Eleven new teasers were posted to his Instagram page. On Nicki Minaj's official website, she stated that they were filming a music video for his second single from the album, called "All Eyes on You". The track features guest vocals from Minaj herself, and American recording artist Chris Brown. The music video was directed by Benny Boom. On July 22, 2015, Meek Mill publicly criticized rapper Drake on Twitter after being upset with Drake's alleged use of his ghostwriter appearing on the album.

Both of the album's respective tracks, the beginner, "Lord Knows" (which features uncredited vocals by Canadian artist Tory Lanez), and the tenth entry, "Check", were later included on a soundtrack to the 2015 boxing drama film, Creed, which was released later in November of that year. The Creed soundtrack was also published by Atlantic Records, the distribution label for Mill's label, Maybach Music Group.

== Critical reception ==
Professional ratings
Aggregate scores
Source	Rating
Metacritic	74/100
Review scores
Source	Rating
AllMusic	4/5 stars
Billboard	3.5/5 stars
Complex	3.5/5 stars
Consequence of Sound	B
HipHopDX	3.5/5
Pitchfork	7.4/10
Rolling Stone	3/5 stars
XXL	4/5 (XL)

Dreams Worth More Than Money received generally positive reviews from music critics. At Metacritic, which assigns a normalized rating out of 100 to reviews from critics, the album received an average score of 74, based on 13 reviews. Marcus Dowling of HipHopDX said, "Dreams Worth More Than Money is a slight misfire for Meek Mill, but enough is there the we think he can eventually achieve in his music the high he’s achieved in his personal life." David Jeffries of AllMusic described the album as divided "between weighty, radio-aimed numbers and loud, Gucci Mane-styled party tracks," while he also claimed that "the unfettered Dreams Worth More Than Money swaggers with the utmost confidence, ferociously declaring its reckless supremacy during the Rick Ross feature 'Been That'." Jeffries concluded his review by writing that "the street-worthy effort seems more influenced by Maybach Music than Minaj, as it forsakes the paparazzi and gossip pages for the better and continues on the path first laid out on the man's mixtapes."

=== Awards ===
Year	Ceremony	Category	Result
2016	Billboard Music Awards	Top Rap Album	Won

== Commercial performance ==
The album debuted at number one on the US Billboard 200, selling 246,000 equivalent album units (215,000 in pure album sales) in the United States, became the artist's first number-one album and the largest sales week since Dreams and Nightmares. It is also the fourth largest sales in the first week for an album of the year. The album spent a second week atop the chart, which was adjusted to an eleven-day tracking period due to alterations in Billboard's tracking week schedule. This period included the previous weeks sales, as well as four days into the following week. Sales for this 'week' reflected the album's total sales since release, and are to 293,000 equivalent album units. After spending 2 weeks at number one, the album fell to number 3 in the third week on chart, with 95,000 units earned in the week ending July 16. By the end of 2015, Dreams Worth More Than Money had sold 350,000 copies domestically.

== Track listing ==
Dreams Worth More Than Money – standard edition
No.	Title	Writer(s)	Producer(s)	Length
1.	"Lord Knows" (featuring Tory Lanez)	Robert Williams; Daystar Peterson; Daniel Gonzalez	Play Picasso	5:18
2.	"Classic" (featuring Swizz Beatz)	Williams; Kasseem Dean; Jeremy Felton; Shondrae Crawford	Mr. Bangladesh	2:47
3.	"Jump Out the Face" (featuring Future)	Williams; Nayvadius Wilburn; Leland Wayne; Joshua Luellen	Metro Boomin; Southside	2:41
4.	"All Eyes on You" (featuring Chris Brown and Nicki Minaj)	Williams; Alex Delicata; Onika Maraj; Christopher Brown; Andre Davidson; Christopher Wallace; Sean Davidson; Kevin Cossom; Danny Morris; Khaled Khaled	Delicata; Morris; The Monarch^{[a]}; Cossom^{[a]}; DJ Khaled^{[a]}	3:43
5.	"The Trillest"	Williams; Juan Peters; Jonathan Ng	Stoopid On Da Beat	4:35
6.	"R.I.C.O." (featuring Drake)	Williams; Aubrey Graham; Allen Ritter; Kevin Gomringer; Tim Gomringer; Quentin Miller; Anderson Hernandez	Vinylz; Ritter; Cubeatz^{[a]}	3:17
7.	"I Got the Juice"	Williams; Ronald LaTour; Daveon Jackson	Cardo; Yung Exclusive^{[a]}	2:55
8.	"Ambitionz"	Williams; Matthew Samuels; Tupac Shakur; Delmar Arnaud	Boi-1da	3:57
9.	"Pullin' Up" (featuring The Weeknd)	Williams; Abel Tesfaye; Benjamin Diehl; Danny Schofield; Carlo Montagnese	Ben Billions; DannyBoyStyles; Illangelo	4:29
10.	"Check"	Williams; Wayne; Luellen	Metro Boomin; Southside	3:14
11.	"Been That" (featuring Rick Ross)	Williams; William Roberts II; Ozan Yildirim; Joshua Scruggs; Matthew Day	OZ; Syk Sense; DJ Fu^{[b]}	3:01
12.	"Bad for You" (featuring Nicki Minaj)	Williams; Maraj; Diehl	Ben Billions	3:23
13.	"Stand Up"	Williams; Marcella Araica; Nathaniel Hills	Danja	4:04
14.	"Cold Hearted" (featuring Puff Daddy)	Williams; Sean Combs; Yildirim	OZ	6:55
Total length:				54:29

Best Buy exclusive deluxe edition (bonus tracks)
No.	Title	Writer(s)	Producer(s)	Length
15.	"My Niggas" (featuring August Alsina)	Williams; Peterson; August Alsina; Michael Hernandez; Carlos Suarez; Richard Duran	The Mekanics; Remedy	3:39
16.	"Main" (featuring Jeremih)	Williams; Jeremih Felton; Orlando Tucker	Jahlil Beats	3:06
Total length:				61:15

Notes

- ^{^[a]} signifies a co-producer
- ^{^[b]} signifies an additional producer
- "Classic" features background vocals from Jeremih
- “Stand Up” features uncredited vocals from DJ Khaled

Sample credits

- "Lord Knows" contains samples from "Mozart's Requiem Lacrimosa" performed by Slovak Philharmonic Orchestra and Choir.
- "All Eyes on You" contains an interpolation from "Notorious Thugs" performed by The Notorious B.I.G.
- "The Trillest" contains a sample and excerpts from "Gone" performed by The Eden Project.
- "Ambitionz" contains an interpolation from "Ambitionz az a Ridah" performed by 2Pac.
- "Been That" contains samples from "The Upset" performed by Paul Kelly.
- "Bad for You" contains samples from "Heart Attack" performed by Flight Facilities featuring Owl Eyes.

== Charts ==
=== Weekly charts ===
Chart (2015)	Peak position
Australian Albums (ARIA)	26
Belgian Albums (Ultratop Flanders)	91
Belgian Albums (Ultratop Wallonia)	108
Canadian Albums (Billboard)	1
Dutch Albums (Album Top 100)	42
French Albums (SNEP)	161
Swedish Albums (Sverigetopplistan)	57
Swiss Albums (Schweizer Hitparade)	26
UK Albums (OCC)	13
US Billboard 200	1
US Top R&B/Hip-Hop Albums (Billboard)	1

=== Year-end charts ===
Chart (2015)	Position
US Billboard 200	20
US Digital Albums (Billboard)	9
US Top R&B/Hip-Hop Albums (Billboard)	6
US Rap Albums (Billboard)	5

== Certifications ==
Region	Certification	Certified units/sales
United Kingdom (BPI)	Silver	60,000^{‡}
United States (RIAA)	Platinum	1,000,000^{‡}
^{‡} Sales+streaming figures based on certification alone.

== See also ==
- List of Billboard 200 number-one albums of 2015
- List of Billboard number-one R&B/Hip-Hop albums of 2015
