= List of Billboard 200 number-one albums of 2015 =

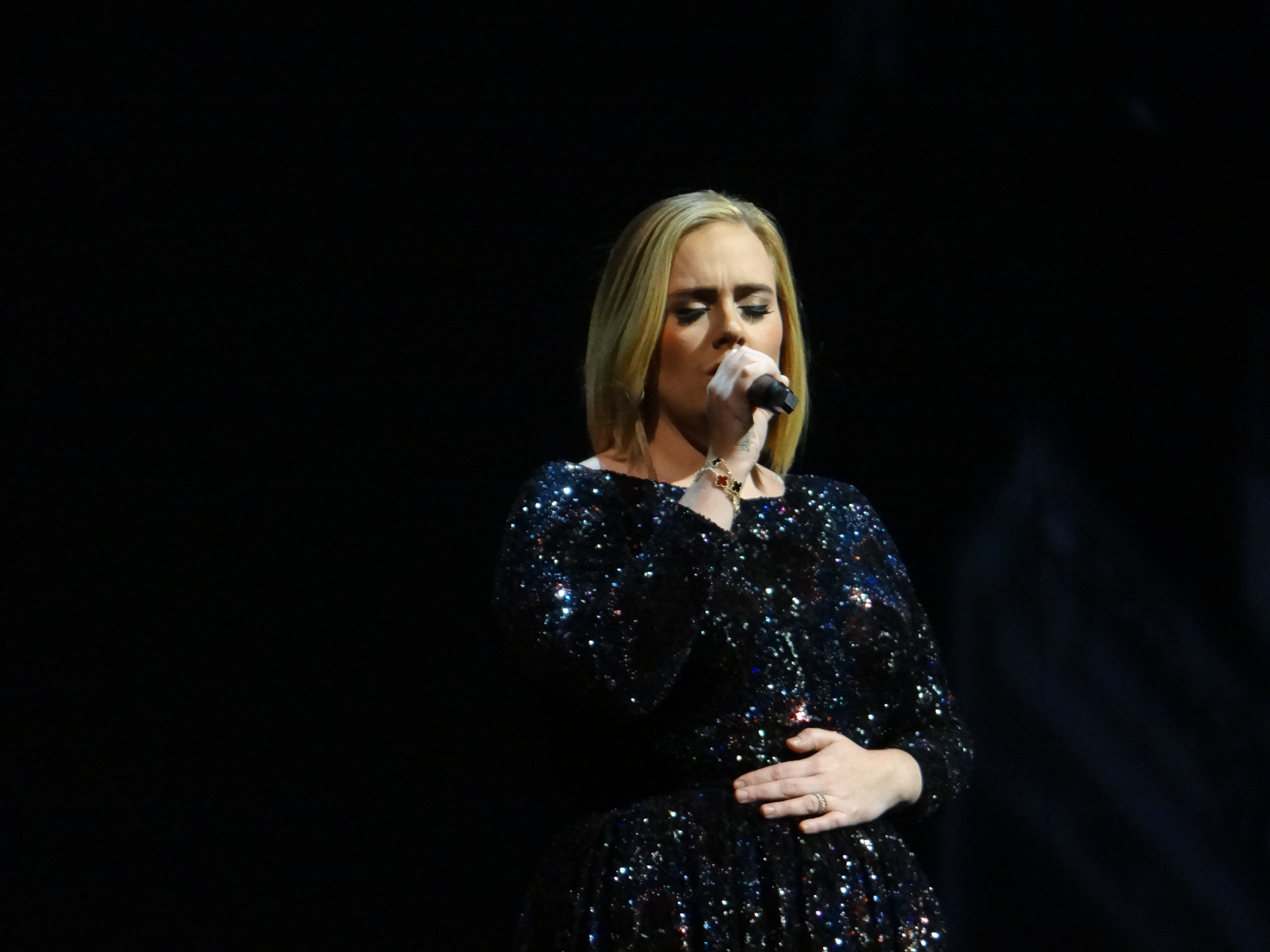
English singer Adele's (pictured) third studio album, 25, was the quickest best-seller of 2015 by the year's end and stayed at the top slot on the Billboard 200 for the final three weeks of that year.

The highest-selling albums and EPs in the United States are ranked in the Billboard 200, which is published by Billboard magazine. The data are compiled by Nielsen Soundscan based on each album's weekly physical and digital sales, as well as on-demand streaming and digital sales of its individual tracks. In 2015, a total of 39 albums claimed the top position of the chart. One of which, American singer-songwriter Taylor Swift's 1989 started its peak issue dated November 15, 2014. 1989 was the longest-running number-one album of the year, staying atop the chart for six weeks and was the best selling album of 2015 before Adele's 25, which managed to surpass the album's sales but after the year-end cut-off. Canadian hip hop soul artist Drake's fourth commercial release, If You're Reading This It's Too Late, became the third best-selling overall album and top-selling digital album with 535,000 digital units sold, 495,000 of which consisted of traditional whole album sales.

Other albums with extended chart runs at number one include To Pimp a Butterfly by Kendrick Lamar, Dreams Worth More Than Money by Meek Mill, Kill the Lights by Luke Bryan, Beauty Behind the Madness by The Weeknd, Traveller by Chris Stapleton and 25 by Adele; four of these albums spent two weeks at the top while the other two spent three weeks at the top position. Throughout 2015, only two acts achieved multiple number-one albums on the chart: Drake with If You're Reading This It's Too Late and What a Time to be Alive, and Future with DS2 and also What a Time to be Alive.

Albums that reached number one on the Top Album Sales chart (which takes into account purely sales and not streaming) but did not reach number one on the Billboard 200 include That's the Spirit by Bring Me the Horizon, Got Your Six by Five Finger Death Punch and Cass County by Don Henley.

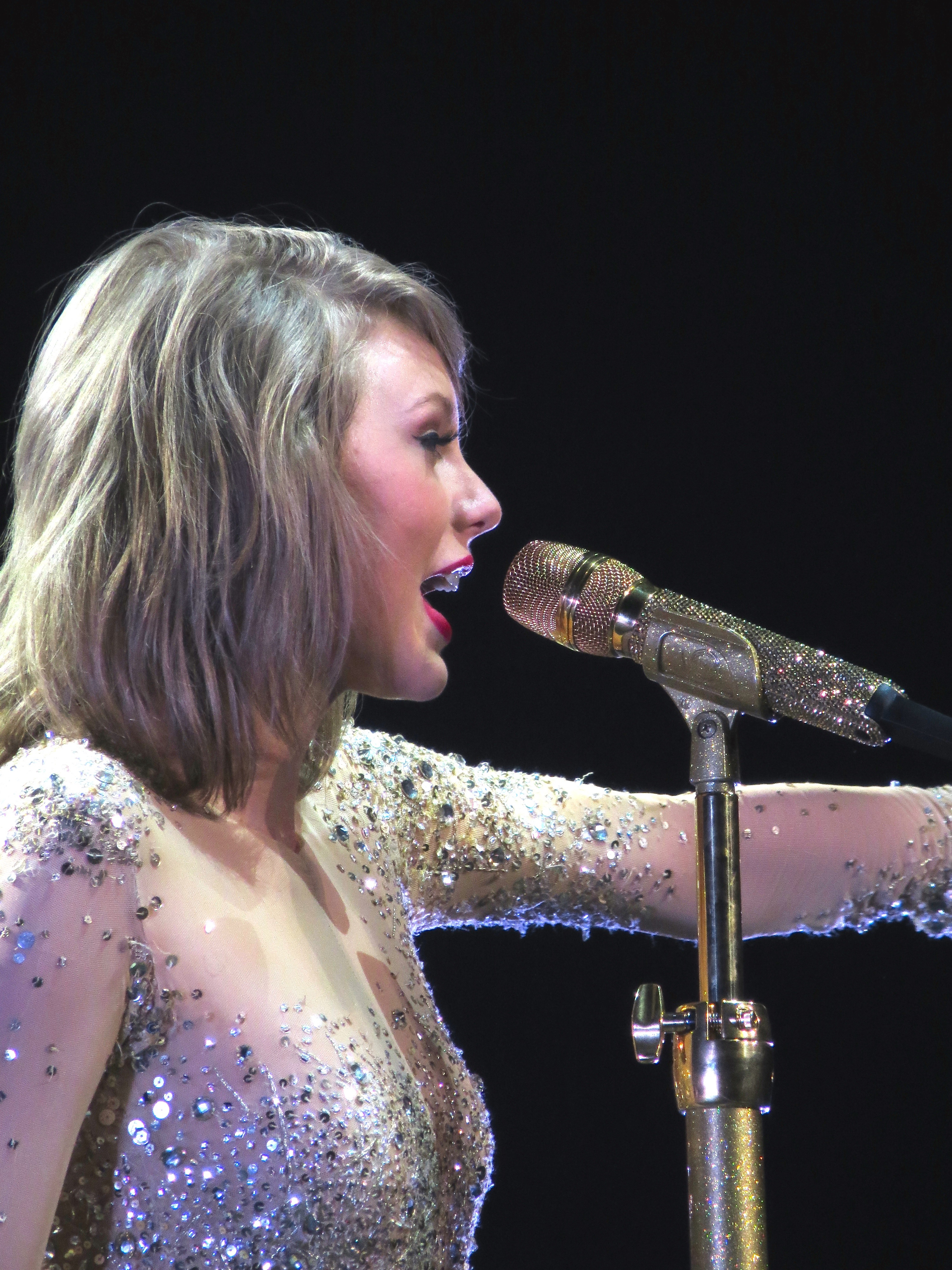
Taylor Swift's 2014 studio album, 1989, was 2015's best performing album on the Billboard 200. It returned to the number one spot on the chart for six weeks in early 2015, accumulating 11 total weeks at number one.

Adele's 25 sold 1.9 million copies after two days of availability, and 2.3 million after three, becoming the fastest-selling album of the 21st century and the best-selling album of 2015. The album reached sales of 2.433 million early on its fourth day, surpassing the single-week record for an album since Nielsen Soundscan began tracking sales in 1991, set by NSYNC's No Strings Attached in March 2000 when it debuted with 2.416 million copies. By its fifth day, 25 had sold over 2.8 million copies, 1.45 million of which were digital sales, breaking the first-week record for a digital set. In total, it sold 3.38 million copies in the US in its first week, becoming the first album to sell over 3 million copies in a week, and only the second to sell over 2 million in a single week.

Since July 2015, the chart's tracking week began on Friday (to coincide with the Global Release Date of the music industry) and ends on Thursday. This change happened between July 25 and August 1.

== Chart history ==
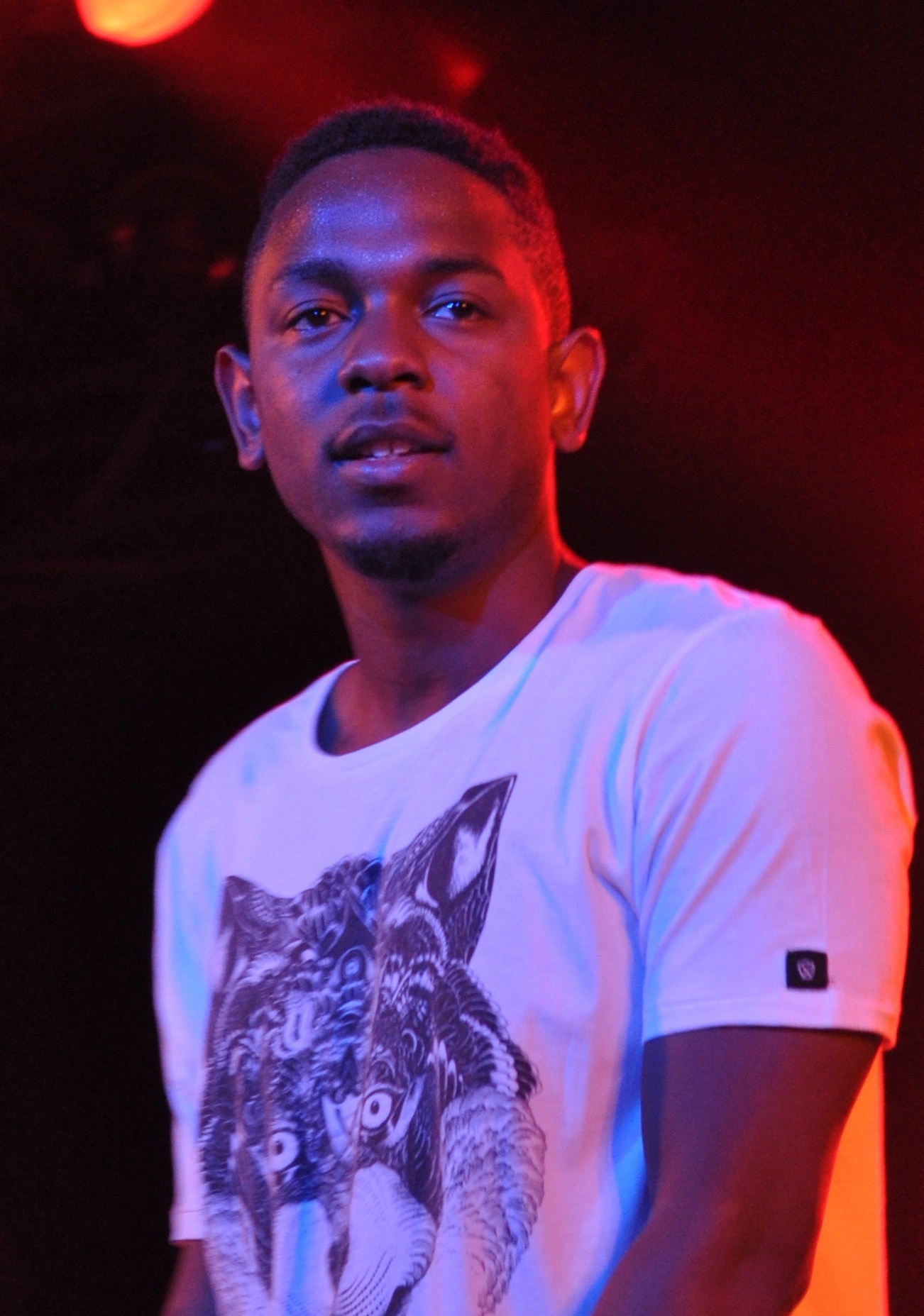
Rapper Kendrick Lamar (pictured) earned his first number-one album on the chart with To Pimp a Butterfly.

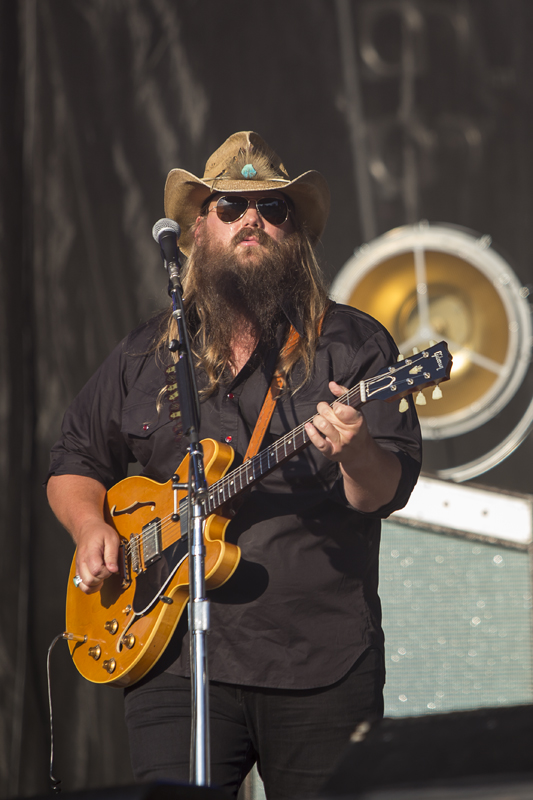
Country singer Chris Stapleton's Traveller topped the chart for two consecutive weeks.

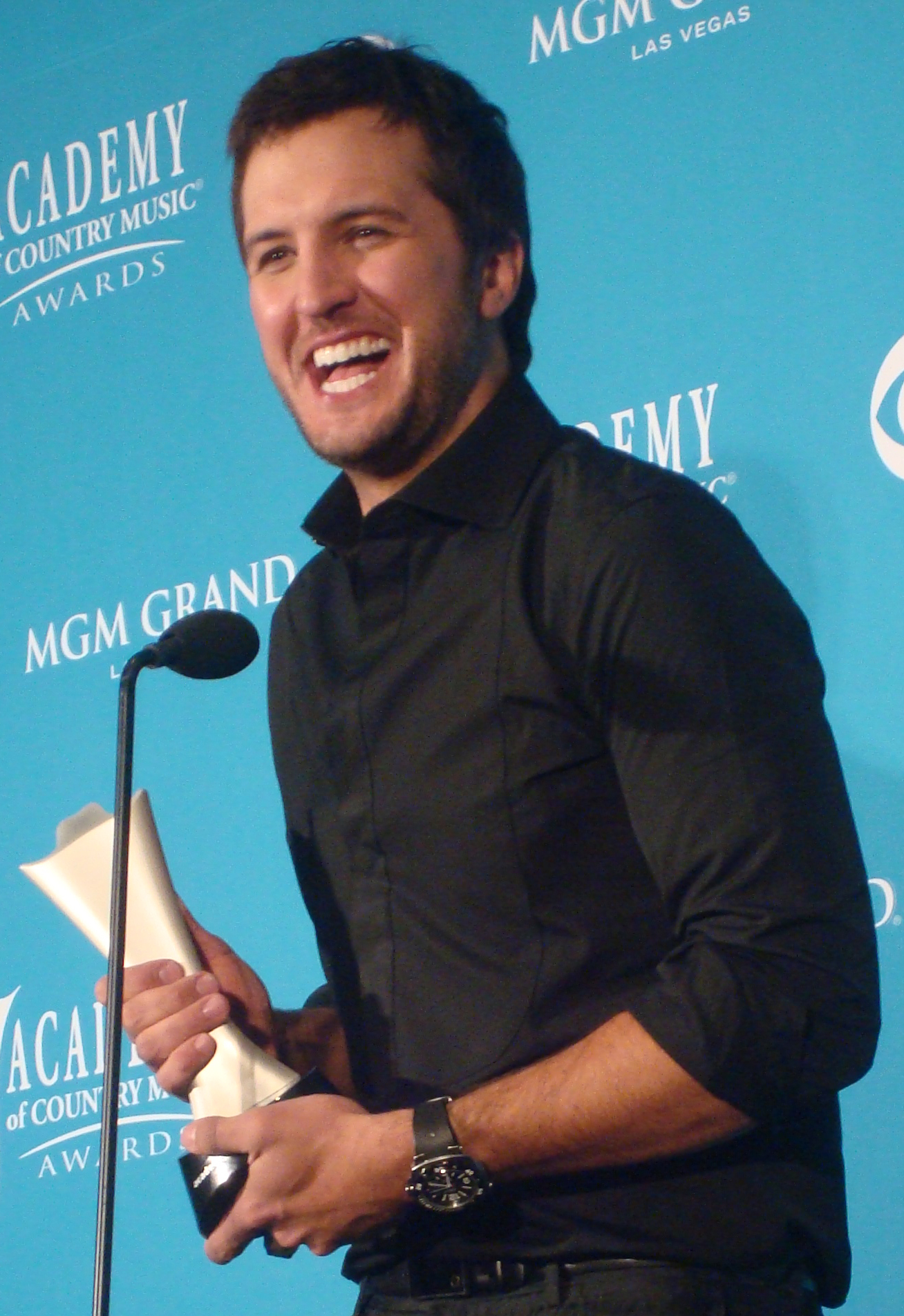
Luke Bryan's third studio album, Kill the Lights, spent two weeks atop the chart.

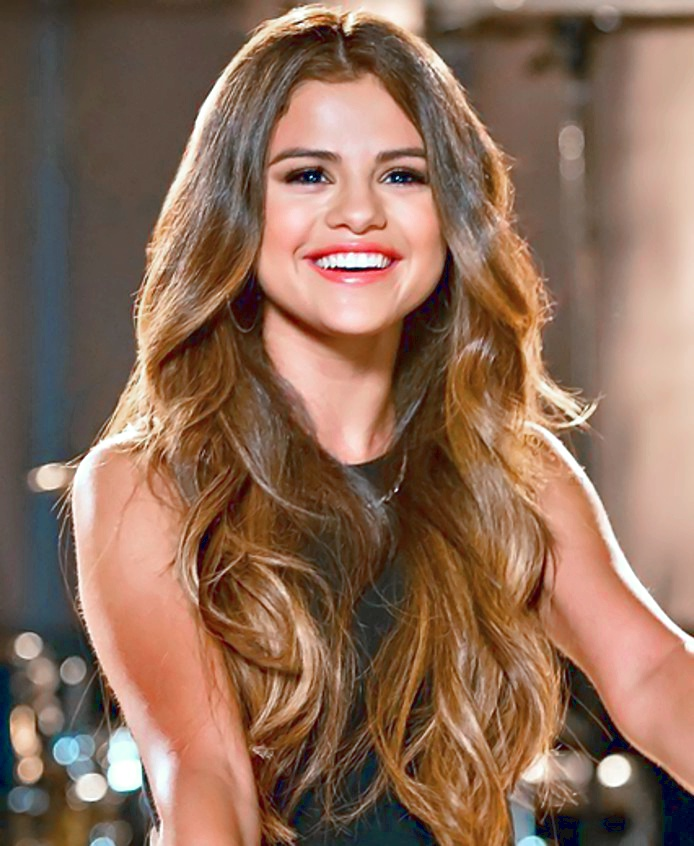
Pop singer Selena Gomez scored her second chart-topper with her second studio album, Revival.

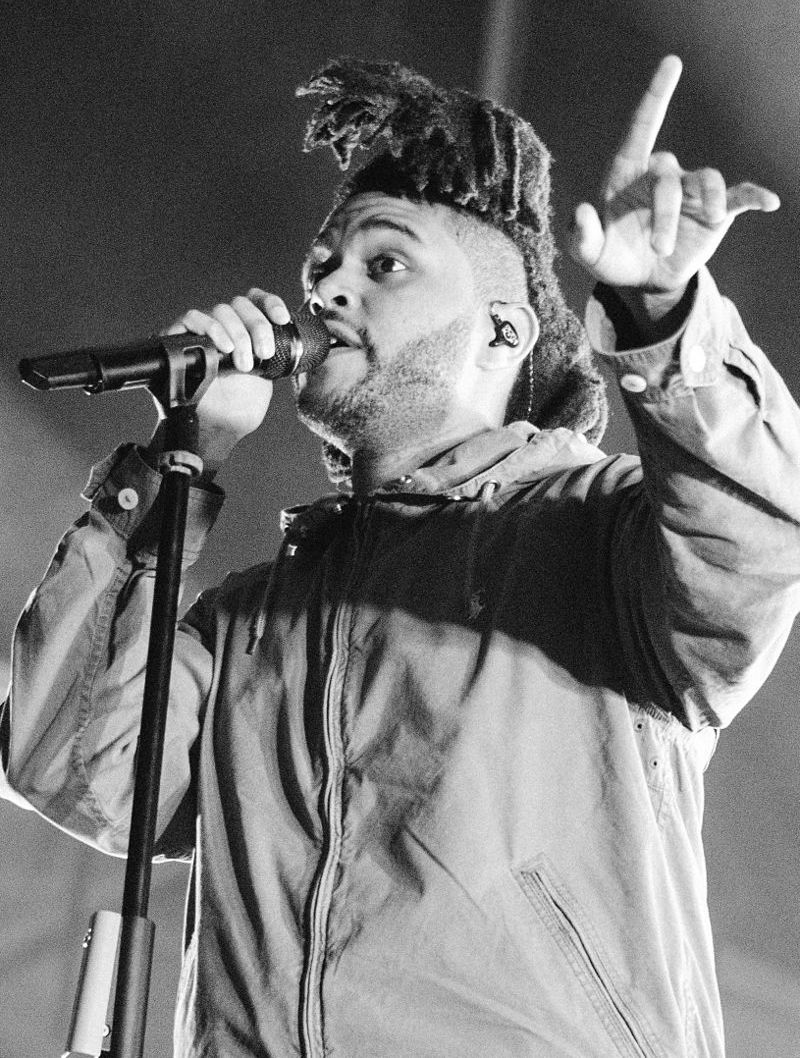
Canadian singer The Weeknd gained his first number-one album in the country with his second studio album, Beauty Behind the Madness.

Key
| † | Indicates best performing album of 2015 |

| Issue date | Album | Artist(s) | Album- equivalent units | Ref. |
|---|---|---|---|---|
| January 3 | 1989 † | Taylor Swift | 375,000 | |
| January 10 | 1989 † | Taylor Swift | 430,000 | |
| January 17 | 1989 † | Taylor Swift | 244,000 | |
| January 24 | 1989 † | Taylor Swift | 155,000 | |
| January 31 | Title | Meghan Trainor | 238,000 | |
| February 7 | American Beauty/American Psycho | Fall Out Boy | 218,000 | |
| February 14 | 1989 † | Taylor Swift | 101,000 | |
| February 21 | 1989 † | Taylor Swift | 108,000 | |
| February 28 | If You're Reading This It's Too Late | Drake | 535,000 | |
| March 7 | Smoke + Mirrors | Imagine Dragons | 195,000 | |
| March 14 | Dark Sky Paradise | Big Sean | 173,000 | |
| March 21 | Piece by Piece | Kelly Clarkson | 97,000 | |
| March 28 | Empire: Original Soundtrack from Season 1 | Soundtrack | 130,000 | |
| April 4 | To Pimp a Butterfly | Kendrick Lamar | 363,000 | |
| April 11 | To Pimp a Butterfly | Kendrick Lamar | 123,000 | |
| April 18 | The Album About Nothing | Wale | 100,000 | |
| April 25 | Furious 7: Original Motion Picture Soundtrack | Soundtrack | 111,000 | |
| May 2 | Handwritten | Shawn Mendes | 119,000 | |
| May 9 | Sound & Color | Alabama Shakes | 97,000 | |
| May 16 | Jekyll + Hyde | Zac Brown Band | 228,000 | |
| May 23 | Wilder Mind | Mumford & Sons | 249,000 | |
| May 30 | Pitch Perfect 2: Original Motion Picture Soundtrack | Soundtrack | 107,000 | |
| June 6 | Blurryface | Twenty One Pilots | 147,000 | |
| June 13 | At. Long. Last. ASAP | ASAP Rocky | 146,000 | |
| June 20 | How Big, How Blue, How Beautiful | Florence and the Machine | 137,000 | |
| June 27 | Drones | Muse | 84,000 | |
| July 4 | Before This World | James Taylor | 97,000 | |
| July 11 | Dark Before Dawn | Breaking Benjamin | 141,000 | |
| July 18 | Dreams Worth More Than Money | Meek Mill | 246,000 | |
| July 25 | Dreams Worth More Than Money | Meek Mill | 289,000 | |
| August 1 | Black Rose | Tyrese | 77,000 | |
| August 8 | DS2 | Future | 151,000 | |
| August 15 | Woman | Jill Scott | 62,000 | |
| August 22 | Descendants (Original TV Movie Soundtrack) | Descendants cast | 42,000 | |
| August 29 | Kill the Lights | Luke Bryan | 345,000 | |
| September 5 | Kill the Lights | Luke Bryan | 99,000 | |
| September 12 | Immortalized | Disturbed | 98,000 | |
| September 19 | Beauty Behind the Madness | The Weeknd | 412,000 | |
| September 26 | Beauty Behind the Madness | The Weeknd | 145,000 | |
| October 3 | Beauty Behind the Madness | The Weeknd | 99,000 | |
| October 10 | What a Time to Be Alive | Drake and Future | 375,000 | |
| October 17 | Fetty Wap | Fetty Wap | 129,000 | |
| October 24 | Unbreakable | Janet Jackson | 116,000 | |
| October 31 | Revival | Selena Gomez | 117,000 | |
| November 7 | Pentatonix | Pentatonix | 98,000 | |
| November 14 | Sounds Good Feels Good | 5 Seconds of Summer | 192,000 | |
| November 21 | Traveller | Chris Stapleton | 177,000 | |
| November 28 | Traveller | Chris Stapleton | 124,000 | |
| December 5 | Purpose | Justin Bieber | 649,000 | |
| December 12 | 25 | Adele | 3,480,000 | |
| December 19 | 25 | Adele | 1,160,000 | |
| December 26 | 25 | Adele | 728,000 | |

== See also ==
- 2015 in American music
- List of Billboard Hot 100 number-one singles of 2015
