= List of Billboard Hot 100 number ones of 2015 =

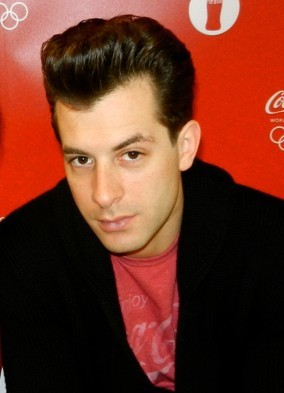
"Uptown Funk" by Mark Ronson (pictured) featuring Bruno Mars spent fourteen weeks at number one, becoming the second longest-running number-one single since the chart's inception in 1940. It later ranked as the best-performing single of the year.

The Billboard Hot 100 is a chart that ranks the best-performing singles of the United States. Its data, compiled by Nielsen SoundScan and published by Billboard magazine, is based collectively on each single's weekly physical and digital sales, as well as airplay and streaming.

During 2015, eight singles reached number one on the Hot 100; a ninth single, "Blank Space" by Taylor Swift, began its run at number one in November 2014. Of those nine number-one singles, three were collaborations. In total, ten acts topped the chart as either lead or featured artists, with six—Mark Ronson, Charlie Puth, Kendrick Lamar, Omi, The Weeknd and Justin Bieber—achieving their first Hot 100 number-one single. Mark Ronson and Bruno Mars' "Uptown Funk" was the longest-running number-one of the year, leading the chart for fourteen weeks; it subsequently topped the Billboard Year-End Hot 100.

== Chart history ==
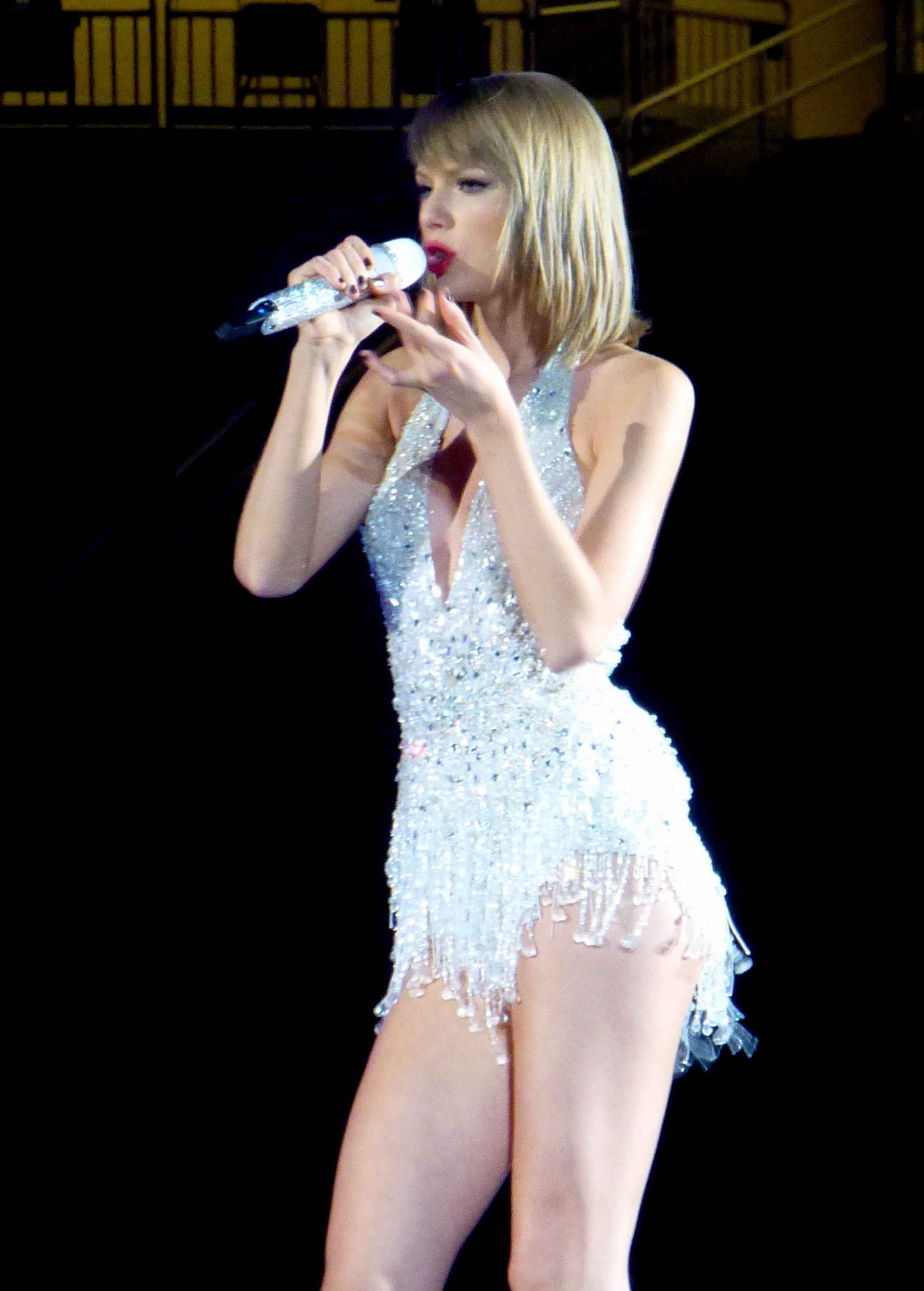
Taylor Swift (pictured) earned her third and fourth number-one singles with "Blank Space" and "Bad Blood".

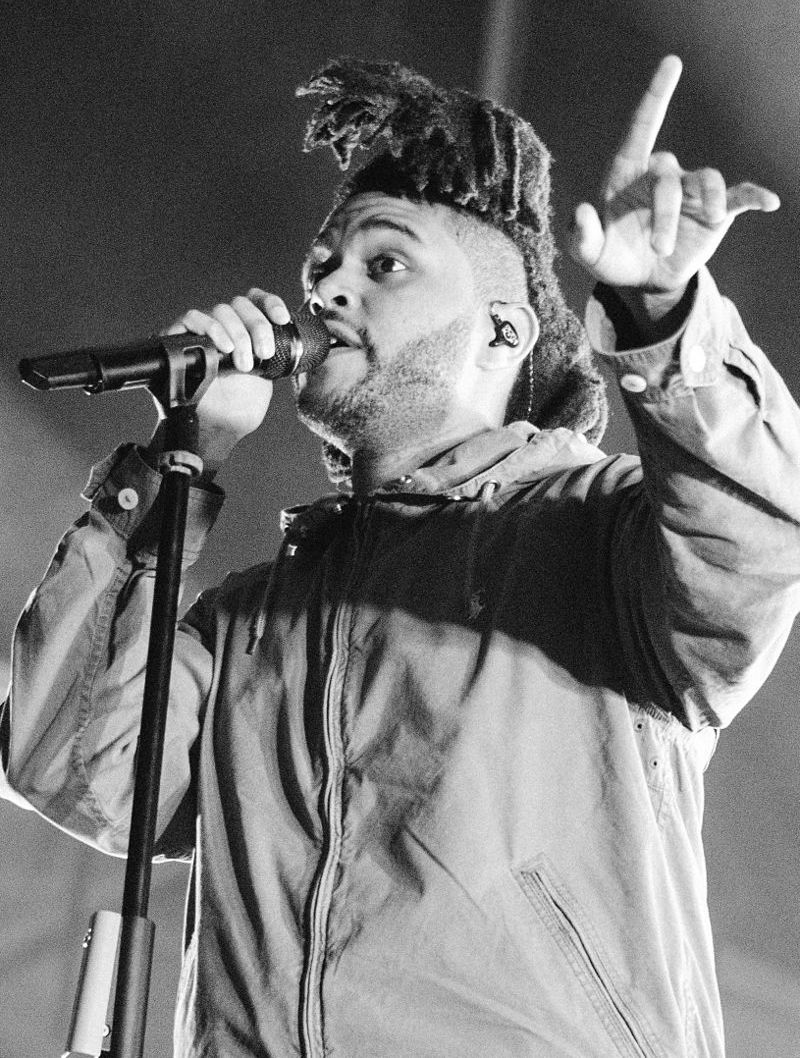
The Weeknd (pictured) earned his first and second number-one singles with "Can't Feel My Face" and "The Hills".

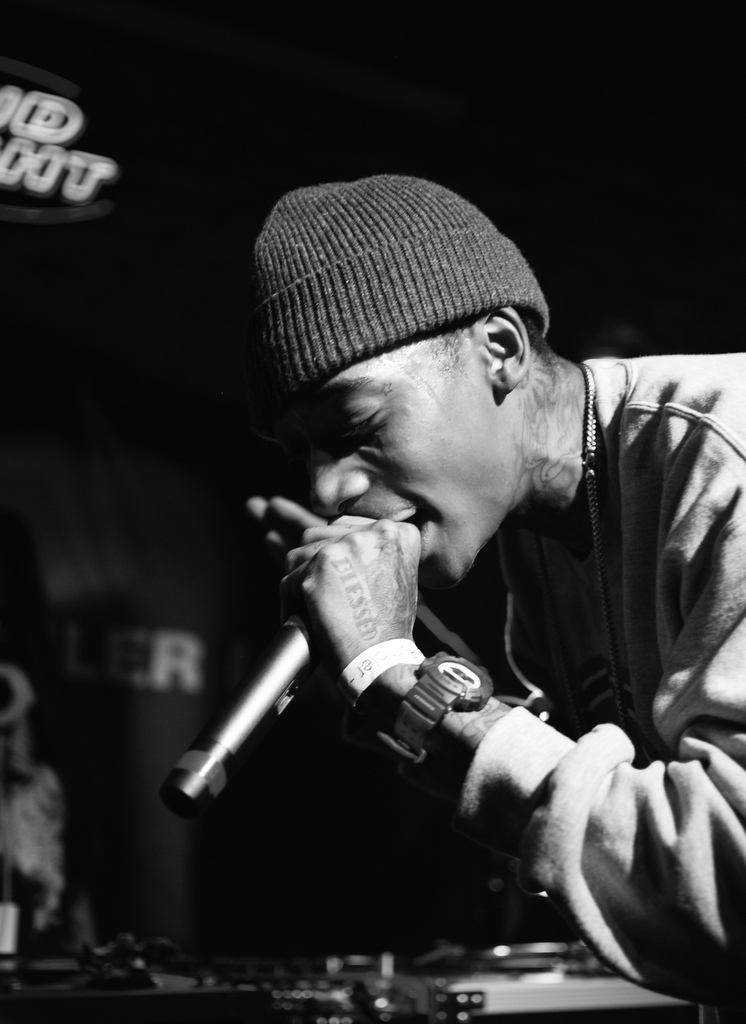
Wiz Khalifa (pictured) earned his second number-one single with "See You Again". It spent 12 weeks at number-one, tying with "Lose Yourself" and "Boom Boom Pow" as the longest-leading rap single.

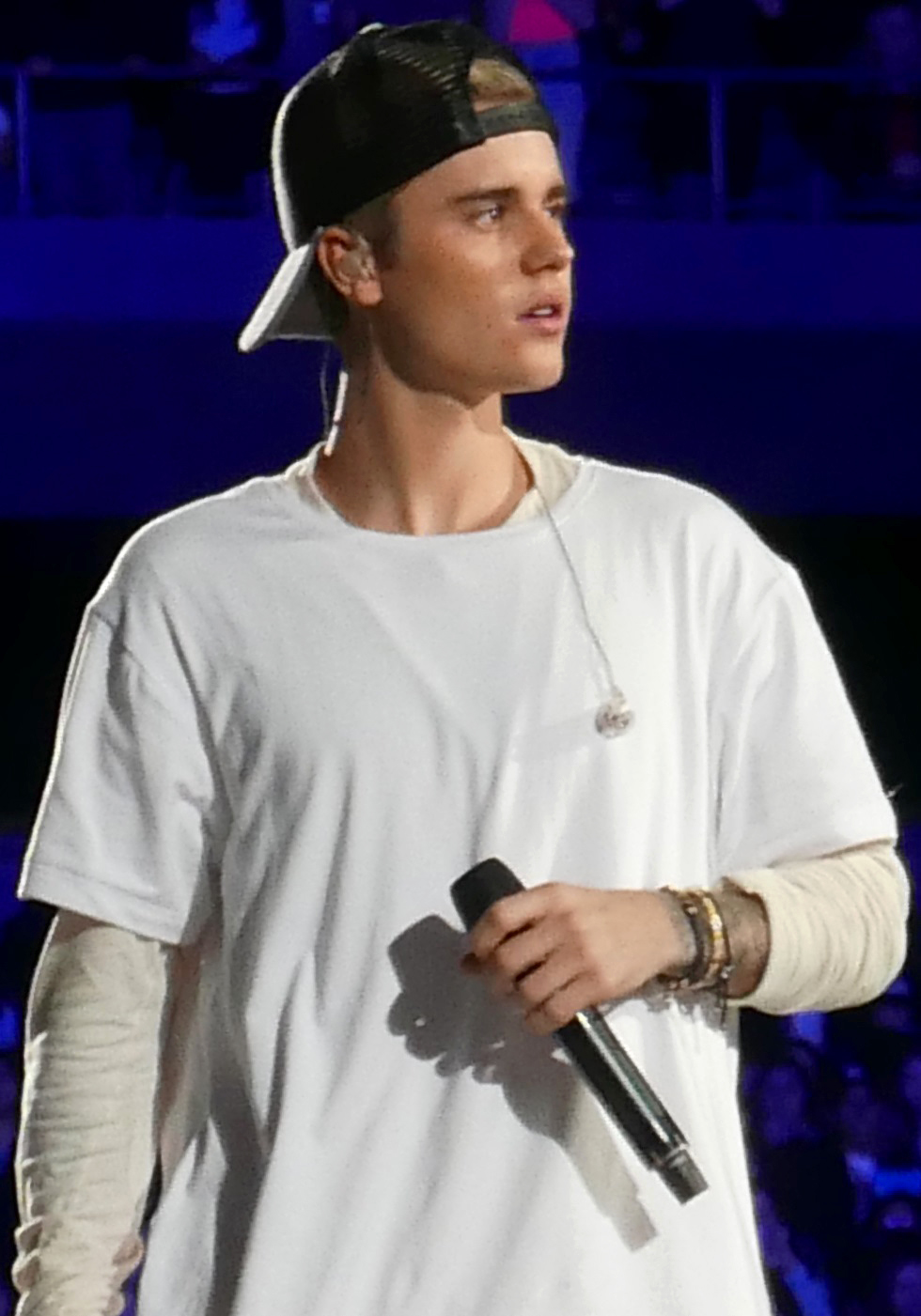
"What Do You Mean?" by Justin Bieber (pictured) debuted at number one, becoming the twenty-third song to do so.

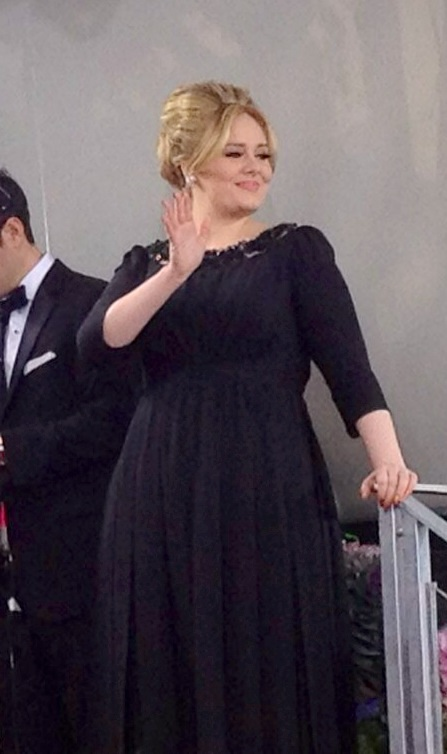
Adele (pictured)'s "Hello" debuted at number one, becoming the twenty-fourth song to do so, and the fourth Adele song to top the Billboard Hot 100.

Key
†	Indicates best-performing single of 2015

No.	Issue date	Song	Artist(s)	Ref.
1040	January 3	"Blank Space"	Taylor Swift	
1040	January 10	"Blank Space"	Taylor Swift	
1041	January 17	"Uptown Funk" †	Mark Ronson featuring Bruno Mars	
1041	January 24	"Uptown Funk" †	Mark Ronson featuring Bruno Mars	
1041	January 31	"Uptown Funk" †	Mark Ronson featuring Bruno Mars	
1041	February 7	"Uptown Funk" †	Mark Ronson featuring Bruno Mars	
1041	February 14	"Uptown Funk" †	Mark Ronson featuring Bruno Mars	
1041	February 21	"Uptown Funk" †	Mark Ronson featuring Bruno Mars	
1041	February 28	"Uptown Funk" †	Mark Ronson featuring Bruno Mars	
1041	March 7	"Uptown Funk" †	Mark Ronson featuring Bruno Mars	
1041	March 14	"Uptown Funk" †	Mark Ronson featuring Bruno Mars	
1041	March 21	"Uptown Funk" †	Mark Ronson featuring Bruno Mars	
1041	March 28	"Uptown Funk" †	Mark Ronson featuring Bruno Mars	
1041	April 4	"Uptown Funk" †	Mark Ronson featuring Bruno Mars	
1041	April 11	"Uptown Funk" †	Mark Ronson featuring Bruno Mars	
1041	April 18	"Uptown Funk" †	Mark Ronson featuring Bruno Mars	
1042	April 25	"See You Again"	Wiz Khalifa featuring Charlie Puth	
1042	May 2	"See You Again"	Wiz Khalifa featuring Charlie Puth	
1042	May 9	"See You Again"	Wiz Khalifa featuring Charlie Puth	
1042	May 16	"See You Again"	Wiz Khalifa featuring Charlie Puth	
1042	May 23	"See You Again"	Wiz Khalifa featuring Charlie Puth	
1042	May 30	"See You Again"	Wiz Khalifa featuring Charlie Puth	
1043	June 6	"Bad Blood"	Taylor Swift featuring Kendrick Lamar	
re	June 13	"See You Again"	Wiz Khalifa featuring Charlie Puth	
re	June 20	"See You Again"	Wiz Khalifa featuring Charlie Puth	
re	June 27	"See You Again"	Wiz Khalifa featuring Charlie Puth	
re	July 4	"See You Again"	Wiz Khalifa featuring Charlie Puth	
re	July 11	"See You Again"	Wiz Khalifa featuring Charlie Puth	
re	July 18	"See You Again"	Wiz Khalifa featuring Charlie Puth	
1044	July 25	"Cheerleader"	Omi	
1044	August 1	"Cheerleader"	Omi	
1044	August 8	"Cheerleader"	Omi	
1044	August 15	"Cheerleader"	Omi	
1045	August 22	"Can't Feel My Face"	The Weeknd	
re	August 29	"Cheerleader"	Omi	
re	September 5	"Cheerleader"	Omi	
re	September 12	"Can't Feel My Face"	The Weeknd	
1046	September 19	"What Do You Mean?"	Justin Bieber	
re	September 26	"Can't Feel My Face"	The Weeknd	
1047	October 3	"The Hills"	The Weeknd	
1047	October 10	"The Hills"	The Weeknd	
1047	October 17	"The Hills"	The Weeknd	
1047	October 24	"The Hills"	The Weeknd	
1047	October 31	"The Hills"	The Weeknd	
1047	November 7	"The Hills"	The Weeknd	
1048	November 14	"Hello"	Adele	
1048	November 21	"Hello"	Adele	
1048	November 28	"Hello"	Adele	
1048	December 5	"Hello"	Adele	
1048	December 12	"Hello"	Adele	
1048	December 19	"Hello"	Adele	
1048	December 26	"Hello"	Adele	

== Number-one artists ==
List of number-one artists by total weeks at number one
Position	Artist	Weeks at No. 1
1	Mark Ronson	14
1	Bruno Mars	14
3	Wiz Khalifa	12
3	Charlie Puth	12
5	The Weeknd	9
6	Adele	7
7	Omi	6
8	Taylor Swift	3
9	Kendrick Lamar	1
9	Justin Bieber	1

== See also ==
- 2015 in American music
- List of Billboard 200 number-one albums of 2015
- List of Billboard Hot 100 top-ten singles in 2015
- List of Billboard Hot 100 number-one singles of the 2010s
