= R.I.C.O. (song) =

Single by Meek Mill featuring Drake

from the album Dreams Worth More Than Money
- Released: June 29, 2015
- Recorded: 2015
- Genre: Trap
- Length: 3:19
- Label: Maybach; Atlantic; Dream Chasers
- Songwriters: Robert Williams; Aubrey Graham; Anderson Hernandez; Allen Ritter; Kevin Gomringer; Tim Gomringer
- Producers: Vinylz; Ritter; Cubeatz

Meek Mill singles chronology
"All Eyes on You" (2015)	"R.I.C.O." (2015)	"Litty" (2017)

Drake singles chronology
"100" (2015)	"R.I.C.O." (2015)	"Energy" (2015)

"R.I.C.O." is a song by American hip hop recording artist Meek Mill, released as the third single from his second studio album Dreams Worth More Than Money, on June 29, 2015. The song features Canadian rapper Drake. The song was produced by Vinylz, Allen Ritter and Cubeatz. The song's title refers to the Racketeer Influenced and Corrupt Organizations Act.

== Controversy ==
On July 22, 2015, Meek Mill publicly criticized the rapper Drake on Twitter, after being upset with Drake's lack of involvement with the promotion of the album, claiming that he used rapper Quentin Miller as a ghostwriter. The controversy caused Drake to respond with two diss songs within a week titled, "Charged Up", and "Back to Back". Meek Mill responded with a counter-diss on July 31, 2015, with a diss song called "Wanna Know".

== Charts ==
=== Weekly charts ===
Chart (2015)	Peak position
Canada Hot 100 (Billboard)	48
UK Hip Hop/R&B (Official Charts)	37
US Billboard Hot 100	40
US Hot R&B/Hip-Hop Songs (Billboard)	15

=== Year-end charts ===
Chart (2015)	Position
US Hot Rap Songs (Billboard)	45

== Certifications ==
Region	Certification	Certified units/sales
New Zealand (RMNZ)	Platinum	30,000^{‡}
United Kingdom (BPI)	Silver	200,000^{‡}
United States (RIAA)	2× Platinum	2,000,000^{‡}
^{‡} Sales+streaming figures based on certification alone.
