= The Hills (song) =

2015 single by the Weeknd

Single by the Weeknd

from the album Beauty Behind the Madness
- Language: English; Amharic
- Released: May 27, 2015
- Recorded: 2014
- Studio: Abel's Crib (Toronto, ON)
- Genre: R&B; trap-soul
- Length: 4:02
- Label: XO; Republic
- Songwriters: Abel Tesfaye; Emmanuel Nickerson; Carlo Montagnese; Ahmad Balshe; Tom Raybould
- Producers: Illangelo; Mano

The Weeknd singles chronology
"Sexodus" (2015)	"The Hills" (2015)	"Can't Feel My Face" (2015)

Music video
- "The Hills" on YouTube

"The Hills" is a song by the Canadian singer-songwriter the Weeknd. It was released on May 27, 2015, as the second single from his second studio album, Beauty Behind the Madness (2015). The song was written by the Weeknd alongside producers Emmanuel "Mano" Nickerson and Illangelo, with Belly receiving additional writing credits.

In the United States, "The Hills" reached number one on the Billboard Hot 100, replacing his own "Can't Feel My Face", and topped the chart for a total of six weeks. On June 28, 2019, the song received a diamond certification from the Recording Industry Association of America (RIAA) for selling more than ten million copies in the United States, becoming his first diamond-certified record. It was also certified diamond in Canada and Australia.

Elsewhere, "The Hills" reached number one in his native Canada, and charted in multiple territories, including the top ten in the United Kingdom, Germany, Australia, and Ireland. "The Hills" has two official remixes, both released on October 10, 2015, one with the rapper Eminem, and another with the rapper Nicki Minaj.

== Background ==
The Weeknd premiered a demo at a South by Southwest party in 2015.

== Music and recording ==
In an interview with Paul Tingen, Illangelo stated that the song was their way of going back to the style of the Weeknd's first mixtapes with "a pop arrangement and chords in a faster tempo". Written, recorded, produced, and mixed in the Weeknd's home studio in Toronto, Ontario, the initial demo for the song was created by producer Emmanuel "Mano" Nickerson. Nickerson sent the demo to the Weeknd, which Illangelo began work on. Shortly after, the Weeknd had an idea for the song's top line. Illangelo wanted the vocals to be "very spacey and lo-fi", taking out a lot of low end, and wanting everything to come together at the song's chorus. The bridge and the outro were the last sections of the song to be written.

The resulting R&B and trap-soul song's sheet music was published by Sony/ATV Music Publishing at Musicnotes. It shows that the song is written in the key of C minor in common time with a tempo of 113 beats per minute. The vocals in the song span from C3 to E♭5.

== Critical reception ==
That's probably the most important song in my career because it is the Weeknd and the irony being it was the most successful song that I had ever done.

— The Weeknd on "The Hills"

"The Hills" received critical acclaim, with most reviewers praising the Weeknd's return to form after his pop-oriented direction with "Earned It". Billboard wrote, "His recent singles ditched his murky sound for shinier, poppier fare, but R&B outlier The Weeknd goes back to basics with "The Hills," an ode to druggy, illicit booty calls. "When I'm f–ed up, that's the real me," he sings over a dissonant synth haze in an arresting update to the woozy hedonism of his influential early mixtapes." Brian Mansfield of USA Today noted that "when a song takes its hook from a horror film—Wes Craven's 1977 cult classic The Hills Have Eyes—you know there's bound to be trouble".

In an analytical piece for Pitchfork, Hannah Giorgis called "The Hills" "a dark, almost discordant meditation on lust, drugs, and fame" while noting that "to those familiar with his repertoire, the only twist in 'The Hills' is how it ends: as the final chords fade, a woman's voice, syrupy and sedate, closes with a lullaby of sorts—not in English, but in Amharic, the primary language of Ethiopia and the Weeknd's own native tongue". She goes on to trace the song's melodic and lyrical origins to the Ethiopian diaspora. She continues, writing that "the familiarity of Tesfaye's strained vibrato makes him the inheritor of musical legacies that Abyssinia has birthed for generations..."

Rolling Stone ranked "The Hills" at number 11 on its "50 best songs of 2015" list: "The Weeknd's second Number One smash of 2015 is much more like the guy we knew from his old mixtapes: Horror-movie shrieks and stormy electronics punctuate his seductive moans about a nihilistic affair, and somehow it's all catchy as hell." Billboard ranked "The Hills" at number 10 on its year-end list for 2015: "Number one hits aren't supposed to be this sonically adventurous and dark, but The Weeknd can do no wrong in 2015. There's barely a pop hook to speak of here—just a beguiling, harrowing soundscape that's impossible to forget". Time named "The Hills" the sixth-best song of 2015: "The music video for the year's darkest No. 1 single finds 25-year-old Abel Tesfaye a.k.a. the Weeknd pulling himself out of a smoking car wreck. It's a fitting visual, as listening to his twisted brand of R&B can feel like rubbernecking when he brags about dysfunctional relationships and being on so many drugs that getting high feels like decaf. Yet the song's throbbing bass and Tesfaye's horror-movie vocal delivery make the song, like some accidents, hard to turn away from." Stereogum ranked it at number 11 on its "The 50 Best Pop Songs Of 2015" list: "With "Earned It" and "Can't Feel My Face," Abel Tesfaye climbed the charts by moving his sound toward the center. What's crazy is that after he got his foot in the door, "The Hills" became an even bigger hit without compromising his illicit, art-damaged aesthetic in the slightest." news.com.au named it as the 24th best song of 2015: "This made No. 1 in America. Let's just let that sink in. Donald Trump is trying to make them even more conservative and this ultra-dark song filled with way more than just swear words tops the charts." The Village Voice ranked "The Hills" at number 22 on their annual year-end critic's poll.

On August 29, 2024, nearly 10 years after release, The Guardian ranked "The Hills" as Tesfaye's best song to date.

== Plagiarism allegation ==
On December 9, 2015, Cutting Edge Music filed a lawsuit against Tesfaye, the producers of the track, and the labels who released the song, for allegedly using the bassline from the score of the film The Machine. The complaint also alleges that a producer who worked on the piece, Emmanuel "Mano" Nickerson, sent a message to the score's composer on Twitter stating that he had sampled the composer's work and that it might appear on the next Weeknd album. As of October 2026, the case remains unsettled.

== Commercial performance ==
In the United States, "The Hills" entered the Billboard Hot 100 at number 20 for the chart dated June 13, 2015, and was the week's highest debut. Its debut was overwhelmingly powered by first-week digital download sales of 109,000 copies and 5.2 million domestic streams, aided by the simultaneous premiere of its music video on the single's release date. The following week, the single declined by one position but earned the largest gain in streams on the chart. It has since become the Weeknd's second number-one single in the United States on the issue dated October 3, 2015, replacing the singer's own "Can't Feel My Face", becoming the first artist since Taylor Swift to replace themselves at the top spot. "The Hills" spent six consecutive weeks at number one before being replaced by Adele's "Hello" on the issue dated of November 14, 2015. It remained in the chart's top ten for 21 consecutive weeks before finally dropping out on January 16, 2016, and also ending the Weeknd's 45-consecutive weeks in the top 10. As of June 2016, "The Hills" has sold 2,946,000 copies in the country.

In the UK, "The Hills" entered the UK Singles Chart at 51, for the week ending June 6, 2015. For the week ending September 10, 2015, it climbed from 35 to 29. For five more weeks, the song reached 23, before skyrocketing to number 5 the week later. On the week ending October 29, 2015, it reached number 3 on its 20th week, being held off by "Perfect" by One Direction (at number 2) and "Turn the Music Louder (Rumble)" by KDA (at number 1). The song spent 7 weeks altogether in the top 10 and 12 in the top 20 and was number 25 on the end of year chart.

Alongside with the United Kingdom, the song charted successfully in others Europeans countries. The song reached top ten in Germany, Ireland, Slovakia and Scotland, top twenty in Belgium, Czech Republic, Denmark, France, Hungary, Norway, Portugal, Russia and Sweden, top thirty in the Netherlands and Switzerland and top forty in Austria and Greece.

== Music videos ==
The music video for "The Hills" was directed by Grant Singer. It was uploaded to YouTube on May 27, 2015, and features a cameo from Rick Wilder, who also appears in both the "Can't Feel My Face" and "Tell Your Friends" music videos. As of 2024, the video has been viewed over 2 billion times.

=== Synopsis ===
The video begins showing a wrecked Lincoln Town Car that has flipped over, and the reason it flipped is unknown. The Weeknd is seen crawling out of the car before helping two women to get out. As the song progresses, the Weeknd is seen walking by himself down South June Street in Los Angeles, and at the beginning of the second chorus, the wrecked Town Car explodes behind him. He occasionally is pushed repeatedly by one of the women from the car. At the end of the song, he enters an abandoned mansion, and goes upstairs to a room illuminated with red light. A man (played by Rick Wilder) holding an apple sits waiting for him, next to two other women, and the video cuts to black.

=== Eminem remix music video ===
Another music video was filmed for the Eminem remix in collaboration with GoPro and United Realities. It is a 360-degree virtual reality video in which the Weeknd is seen leaving a venue and heading to his limo (taking him to the afterparty featured in an Apple Music commercial, with John Travolta as his driver). As the viewer changes the angles, it is shown that comets are raining down and the raining debris causing fiery explosions around the area. The car that's flipped over in the original music video is also in view. As he approaches his limousine, a fiery explosion consumes him.

== Live performances ==
"The Hills" was performed live for the first time during the Weeknd's set, on April 11, 2015, at the Coachella Valley Music and Arts Festival.

== Other versions ==
On October 10, 2015, two remixes of the song were released online. One featured American rapper Eminem and the other featured Trinidad rapper Nicki Minaj. The remix by Minaj was performed on Saturday Night Live along with the Weeknd. The Eminem remix was a personal request from Tesfaye, and a virtual music video was released for it. American rapper Lil Wayne remixed the song for his mixtape No Ceilings 2.

On August 9, 2016, a remix was released by the Belgian DJ duo, Dimitri Vegas & Like Mike, as one of the free downloads of their "Summer of Madness" tracks. Another remix was released on Tesfaye's YouTube channel by RL Grime.

== Popular culture ==
- The song was featured in season 1, episode 21 of Life in Pieces.
- Yves Saint Laurent's featured the song in a commercial to advertise Black Opium perfume, featuring Zoe Kravitz.
- The song is available in Rock Band 4 as downloadable content.
- The song is featured in the 2017 online video game Fortnite as a playable song in its "Fortnite Festival" mode, which the Weeknd had also headlined.

== Track listing ==
- Digital download
1. "The Hills" – 3:55
- Digital download – remixes
1. "The Hills" (featuring Eminem) – 4:23
2. "The Hills" (featuring Nicki Minaj) – 4:02
- Digital download – remixes
1. "The Hills" (RL Grime Remix) – 4:31
2. "The Hills" (Dimitri Vegas & Like Mike Remix) – 5:55

== Charts ==
=== Weekly charts ===
Chart (2015–2026)	Peak position
Australia (ARIA)	3
Australian Urban (ARIA)	3
Austria (Ö3 Austria Top 40)	31
Belgium (Ultratop 50 Flanders)	18
Belgium Urban (Ultratop Flanders)	3
Belgium (Ultratop 50 Wallonia)	18
Canada Hot 100 (Billboard)	1
Canada CHR/Top 40 (Billboard)	2
Canada Hot AC (Billboard)	38
CIS Airplay (TopHit)	14
Czech Republic Airplay (ČNS IFPI)	41
Czech Republic Singles Digital (ČNS IFPI)	12
Denmark (Tracklisten)	11
Euro Digital Song Sales (Billboard)	2
France (SNEP)	11
Germany (GfK)	10
Global 200 (Billboard)	44
Greece International (IFPI)	39
Hungary (Single Top 40)	19
Hungary (Stream Top 40)	14
Ireland (IRMA)	4
Italy (FIMI)	47
Lebanon (Lebanese Top 20)	16
Netherlands (Dutch Top 40 Tipparade)	2
Netherlands (Single Top 100)	29
New Zealand (Recorded Music NZ)	2
Norway (VG-lista)	16
Portugal (AFP)	11
Russia Airplay (TopHit)	10
Scottish Singles Sales (Official Charts)	9
Singapore (Billboard)	24
Slovakia Airplay (ČNS IFPI)	38
Slovakia Singles Digital (ČNS IFPI)	8
Spain (Promusicae)	64
Sweden (Sverigetopplistan)	12
Switzerland (Schweizer Hitparade)	23
UK Singles (Official Charts)	3
UK Hip Hop/R&B (Official Charts)	1
Ukraine Airplay (TopHit)	35
US Billboard Hot 100	1
US Adult Pop Airplay (Billboard)	40
US Dance Club Songs (Billboard)	41
US Dance Airplay (Billboard)	6
US Hot R&B/Hip-Hop Songs (Billboard)	1
US Pop Airplay (Billboard)	2
US Rhythmic Airplay (Billboard)	1

=== Year-end charts ===
Chart (2015)	Position
Australia (ARIA)	20
Australia Urban (ARIA)	8
Canada (Canadian Hot 100)	18
Denmark (Tracklisten)	38
France (SNEP)	89
Germany (Official German Charts)	54
Hungary (Stream Top 40)	44
Netherlands (Single Top 100)	96
New Zealand (Recorded Music NZ)	16
Sweden (Sverigetopplistan)	63
UK Singles (OCC)	25
US Billboard Hot 100	10
US Hot R&B/Hip-Hop Songs (Billboard)	4
US Mainstream Top 40 (Billboard)	29
US R&B/Hip-Hop Airplay (Billboard)	21
US Rhythmic (Billboard)	5

Chart (2016)	Position
Australia Urban (ARIA)	19
Canada (Canadian Hot 100)	39
CIS (Tophit)	30
France (SNEP)	134
Russia Airplay (Tophit)	29
UK Singles (OCC)	77
Ukraine Airplay (Tophit)	155
US Billboard Hot 100	32
US Hot R&B/Hip-Hop Songs (Billboard)	10
US R&B/Hip-Hop Airplay (Billboard)	39

Chart (2022)	Position
Global 200 (Billboard)	176

Chart (2024)	Position
Australia Hip Hop/R&B (ARIA)	48

=== Decade-end charts ===
Chart (2010–2019)	Position
UK Singles (OCC)	94
US Billboard Hot 100	31
US Hot R&B/Hip-Hop Songs (Billboard)	5

=== All-time charts ===
Chart (1958–2018)	Position
US Billboard Hot 100	135

== Certifications ==
Region	Certification	Certified units/sales
Australia (ARIA)	12× Platinum	840,000^{‡}
Austria (IFPI Austria)	2× Platinum	60,000^{‡}
Belgium (BRMA)	Gold	10,000^{‡}
Brazil (Pro-Música Brasil)	3× Diamond	750,000^{‡}
Canada (Music Canada)	Diamond	800,000^{‡}
Denmark (IFPI Danmark)	2× Platinum	180,000^{‡}
Germany (BVMI)	3× Gold	600,000^{‡}
Italy (FIMI)	2× Platinum	200,000^{‡}
Mexico (AMPROFON)	2× Platinum	120,000^{‡}
New Zealand (RMNZ)	8× Platinum	240,000^{‡}
Norway (IFPI Norway)	Gold	20,000^{‡}
Poland (ZPAV)	4× Platinum	200,000^{‡}
Portugal (AFP)	3× Platinum	60,000^{‡}
Spain (Promusicae)	Platinum	60,000^{‡}
Sweden (GLF)	3× Platinum	120,000^{‡}
United Kingdom (BPI)	5× Platinum	3,000,000^{‡}
United States (RIAA)	11× Platinum	11,000,000^{‡}
Streaming
Greece (IFPI Greece)	3× Platinum	6,000,000^{†}
^{‡} Sales+streaming figures based on certification alone.^{†} Streaming-only figures based on certification alone.

== See also ==
- List of highest-certified singles in Australia
