= All Eyes on You =

2015 single by Meek Mill featuring Chris Brown and Nicki Minaj

Single by Meek Mill featuring Chris Brown and Nicki Minaj

from the album Dreams Worth More Than Money
- Released: June 26, 2015
- Recorded: 2015
- Genre: Hip hop; R&B
- Length: 3:45
- Label: Maybach Music Group; Dream Chasers; Atlantic
- Songwriters: Robert Williams; Onika Maraj; Christopher Brown; Alex Delicata; Andre Davidson; Sean Davidson; Kevin Cossom; Danny Morris; Christopher Wallace
- Producers: Morris; Delicata; the Monarch; Cossom; DJ Khaled

Meek Mill singles chronology
| "Poppin' (Remix)" (2015) | "All Eyes on You" (2015) | "R.I.C.O." (2015) |

Chris Brown singles chronology
| "How Many Times" (2015) | "All Eyes on You" (2015) | "Liquor" (2015) |

Nicki Minaj singles chronology
| "Bitch I'm Madonna" (2015) | "All Eyes on You" (2015) | "Back Together" (2015) |

"All Eyes on You" is a song by American rapper Meek Mill, released as the second single from his second studio album Dreams Worth More Than Money, on June 26, 2015. The song features Nicki Minaj with additional vocals from Chris Brown. It is a hip hop and R&B song, produced by Danny Morris, Alex Delicata, and co-produced by the Monarch, Kevin Cossom and DJ Khaled.

== Commercial performance ==
"All Eyes on You" entered the Billboard Hot 100 at number 81 for the chart dated July 11, 2015. Its chart debut was aided in part by first-week download sales of 44,000. The following week, following the release of Dreams Worth More Than Money, it jumped to number 32, having sold an additional 62,000 copies It has so far peaked at number 21, becoming Meek Mill's highest-charting single to date until his single Going Bad from his album Championships peaked at number 6 . As of August 2015, "All Eyes on You" has sold 214,000 copies domestically. On July 20, 2017, the single was certified Double Platinum by the Recording Industry Association of America (RIAA) for combined sales and streaming equivalent units of over two million units in the United States.

== Music video ==
Filming for the "All Eyes on You" video took place in late June 2015. The video was released on July 27, 2015. It was directed by Benny Boom. It also features a cameo appearance by American hip-hop trio Migos.

== Charts ==
=== Weekly charts ===
| Chart (2015) | Peak position |
|---|---|
| Australia (ARIA) | 51 |
| Belgium (Ultratip Bubbling Under Flanders) | 19 |
| Canada Hot 100 (Billboard) | 40 |
| France (SNEP) | 186 |
| Ireland (IRMA) | 76 |
| Netherlands (Single Top 100) | 82 |
| New Zealand Heatseekers (RMNZ) | 9 |
| Slovakia Singles Digital (ČNS IFPI) | 54 |
| Sweden (Sverigetopplistan) | 89 |
| UK Singles (Official Charts) | 55 |
| UK Hip Hop/R&B (Official Charts) | 14 |
| US Billboard Hot 100 | 21 |
| US Hot R&B/Hip-Hop Songs (Billboard) | 8 |
| US R&B/Hip-Hop Airplay (Billboard) | 1 |
| US Rhythmic Airplay (Billboard) | 11 |

=== Year-end charts ===
| Chart (2015) | Position |
|---|---|
| US Billboard Hot 100 | 69 |
| US Hot R&B/Hip-Hop Songs | 23 |
| US Rhythmic | 39 |

== Certifications ==
| Region | Certification | Certified units/sales |
|---|---|---|
| Denmark (IFPI Danmark) | Gold | 45,000^{‡} |
| New Zealand (RMNZ) | 2× Platinum | 60,000^{‡} |
| United Kingdom (BPI) | Platinum | 600,000^{‡} |
| United States (RIAA) | 2× Platinum | 2,000,000^{‡} |
^{‡} Sales+streaming figures based on certification alone.
