= 2015 in American music =

The following is a list of notable events and releases that happened in 2015 in music in the United States.

== Notable events ==
=== January ===
- 12 – Lady Antebellum performed the National Anthem at the first ever College Football Playoff National Championship Game.
- 13 – Guster released their first studio album in five years, Evermotion.
  - Panda Bear released their first studio album in four years, Panda Bear Meets the Grim Reaper.
- 30 – The Offspring set a record for longest time between #1 singles on the Mainstream Rock charts with Coming for You, their first since Gone Away in 1997.

=== February ===
- 1 – Idina Menzel performed the National Anthem and Katy Perry performed at the halftime show during Super Bowl XLIX at University of Phoenix Stadium in Glendale, Arizona. This was the most watched, highest-rated, and most tweeted per second halftime show.
- 8 – The 57th Grammy Awards, hosted by LL Cool J, took place at the Staples Center in Los Angeles. British singer Sam Smith won the most awards with four including; Record of the Year, Song of the Year, Best Pop Vocal Album, and Best New Artist. Beck's Morning Phase won Album of the Year.

=== March ===
- 3 – Kelly Clarkson released her first studio album of all original music in almost four years, Piece by Piece.
- 15 – Kendrick Lamar's third studio album, To Pimp a Butterfly, was released eight days earlier than scheduled. Nevertheless, it became his first number one album on the Billboard 200.
- 29 – The 2nd iHeartRadio Music Awards took place at the Shrine Auditorium in Los Angeles. Taylor Swift won the most awards with three.

=== April ===
- 19 – The 50th ACM Awards were held at AT&T Stadium in Arlington, Texas, hosted by Luke Bryan and Blake Shelton. Miranda Lambert won the most awards with three.

=== May ===
- 13 – Nick Fradiani was named winner of the fifteenth season of American Idol. Clark Beckham was named winner runner-up.
- 17 – The 2015 Billboard Music Awards were held at the MGM Grand Garden Arena. Taylor Swift took home the most awards with eight.
- 19 – Sawyer Fredericks was named winner of the eighth season of The Voice. Meghan Linsey was named runner-up. Joshua Davis and Koryn Hawthorne finishing third and fourth place respectively.
  - – Faith No More released their first studio album in 18 years, Sol Invictus.
- 30 – Madonna gets her record 45th number-one song on the dance charts, with the song Ghosttown, surpassing George Strait for the most number-one entries on any kind of Billboard chart.

=== June ===
- 8 – The music video for "Dark Horse" by Katy Perry reached 1 billion views on Vevo, making it the first music video by a female artist to do so and the third music video overall to do so. It was the third most-viewed YouTube video of all time, and the most-watched video by a female artist until "Blank Space" by Taylor Swift took both records a month later.
- 16 – Hilary Duff released her first studio album in seven years, Breathe In. Breathe Out..
- 30 – Failure released their first studio album in 19 years, The Heart Is a Monster.

=== July ===
- 10 – Starting on this day albums will now be released on Fridays instead of Tuesdays in America. Some reasons for the change is to help prevent illegal downloads and "In the digital world, you can't make consumers wait".
  - Veruca Salt released their first studio album in nine years, Ghost Notes. This is also the first album to feature the band's original lineup since 1997's Eight Arms to Hold You.
- 30 – The reunited Savatage played their first show in thirteen years at Wacken Open Air in Germany, which took place from July 30 to August 1.

=== August ===
- 30 – The 2015 MTV Video Music Awards were held at the Microsoft Theater in Los Angeles. Taylor Swift was the big winner of the night with four awards, including Video of the Year for "Bad Blood".

=== September ===
- 11 – Slayer released their first album in six years, Repentless. Their album was their first since the death of founding guitarist Jeff Hanneman in 2013 and subsequently proved to be the band's final album following their disbandment in 2019.
- 18–19 – The 2015 iHeartRadio Music Festival took place at the MGM Grand Garden Arena in Las Vegas.

=== October ===
- 2 – Janet Jackson released Unbreakable her first album since 2008's Discipline to widespread critical acclaim. The album goes on to top the Billboard 200 chart.
- 4 – Van Halen concluded their 2015 North American tour, performing the final date at the Hollywood Bowl in Los Angeles. It would ultimately prove to be the band's final performance before they officially disbanded, due to Eddie Van Halen's death almost exactly five years later.
- 23 – The music video for Adele's "Hello" broke the Vevo Record for the most views within a 24-hour span with 27.7 million views, beating out the previous record held by Taylor Swift's "Bad Blood". It also broke the record for shortest time to attain 100 million Vevo views, previously held by Miley Cyrus' "Wrecking Ball". In 2017, Swift took back the record with 43.2 million views with the music video for Look What You Made Me Do.

=== November ===
- 2 – Adele's comeback single "Hello" became the first song with over a million digital sales in a week.
- 7 – The 49th Annual Country Music Association Awards was held at the Bridgestone Arena in Nashville. Brad Paisley and Carrie Underwood hosted for the eighth year in a row.
- 9 – Chester Bennington amicably departs from Stone Temple Pilots as lead singer to focus more on Linkin Park.
- 22 – The 2015 American Music Awards was held at the Microsoft Theatre in Los Angeles.
- 28 – Billboard reported Adele's 25 sold 3.38 million in pure album sales in its first week of release, according to Nielsen Music. That's the largest single sales week for an album since Nielsen began tracking point-of-sale music purchases in 1991, surpassing the previous single-week sales record, held by NSYNC's No Strings Attached (2.42 million sold in the week ending March 26, 2000).

=== December ===
- 3 – Former Stone Temple Pilots & Velvet Revolver singer Scott Weiland is found dead on his tour bus in Bloomington, Minnesota at the age of 48 while on tour with his band, the Wildabouts.
- 8 – Nominations for the 58th Annual Grammy Awards were announced, with Kendrick Lamar leading the list.
- 15 – Jordan Smith was named winner of the ninth season of The Voice. Emily Ann Roberts was named runner-up. Barrett Baber and Jeffery Austin finishing third and fourth place respectively.

== Bands formed ==
- Almost Monday
- Beach Weather
- CNCO
- Dead & Company
- DNCE
- Flipturn
- Momma
- Saint Asonia
- Transviolet
- Zen From Mars

== Bands reformed ==
- The 13th Floor Elevators
- The Academy Is...
- Acceptance
- Aiden
- Armor for Sleep
- At the Drive-In
- The Black Eyed Peas
- Brooks & Dunn
- Daphne and Celeste
- Dashboard Confessional
- Digable Planets
- Disturbed
- Evanescence
- Good Charlotte
- LCD Soundsystem
- Matchbook Romance
- The Matches
- Pist.On
- The Promise Ring
- Royal Trux
- Savatage
- Sherwood
- Sister Machine Gun
- Thrice
- Underoath
- Ween

== Bands on hiatus ==
- The Black Keys
- The Dead Weather
- Fireworks
- Framing Hanley
- fun.
- The Gaslight Anthem
- The Ghost Inside
- Guns N' Roses
- Pinback
- Rusted Root
- Staind
- Teenage Bottlerocket
- Yeah Yeah Yeahs

== Bands disbanded ==
- 3 Inches of Blood
- Avi Buffalo
- Bear in Heaven
- The Black Crowes
- Bloodhound Gang
- California Breed
- CBS Orchestra
- Cobra Starship
- Dead Confederate
- Device
- Erase Errata
- Flesh for Lulu
- Framing Hanley
- Funeral For a Friend
- G.R.L.
- I, the Breather
- Kill Hannah
- Klaxons
- Maybeshewill
- Mean Creek
- MellowHype
- Mötley Crüe
- Motörhead
- Neutral Milk Hotel
- Noah and the Whale
- No Doubt
- Obits
- Odd Future
- The Presidents of the United States of America
- The Replacements
- Rise to Remain
- The Rosso Sisters
- Scott Weiland and the Wildabouts
- Sleeper Agent
- Tangerine Dream
- Texas in July
- The Weakerthans

== Albums released in 2015 ==
=== January ===
Date	Album	Artist	Genre(s)
6	Onward and Sideways	Joshua Radin	Acoustic; folk
6	SremmLife	Rae Sremmurd	Hip-hop; trap
13	Redemption of the Beast	DMX	Hip-hop
13	Sand in the Sky	The Expendables	Reggae; rock; ska
13	Lesser Oceans	Fences	Pop rock; alternative rock; indie rock
13	Evermotion	Guster	Alternative rock; indie rock
13	My Garden	Kat Dahlia	Alternative R&B; hip-hop
13	The Pale Emperor	Marilyn Manson	Alternative rock; hard rock; blues rock
13	Panda Bear Meets the Grim Reaper	Panda Bear	Psychedelia; electropop
13	Nonstop Feeling	Turnstile	Punk rock; hardcore punk
20	The Soundtrack of My Life	Donny Osmond	Pop
20	Uptown Special	Mark Ronson	Funk, R&B, pop
20	Reality Show	Jazmine Sullivan	R&B; pop
20	Title	Meghan Trainor	Pop; R&B; doo-wop; blue-eyed soul
20	What a Terrible World, What a Beautiful World	The Decemberists	Indie rock
20	American Beauty/American Psycho	Fall Out Boy	Pop punk; pop; arena rock
20	Tetsuo & Youth	Lupe Fiasco	Hip-hop
20	B4.Da.$$	Joey Bada$$	Hip-hop
27	Tony Lucca	Tony Lucca	Acoustic; folk
27	Control	Milo Greene	Indie pop; alternative rock
27	Non-Fiction	Ne-Yo	R&B
27	F.E.A.R.	Papa Roach	Rock

=== February ===
Date	Album	Artist	Genre(s)
3	Lost Themes	John Carpenter	Electronic
3	Shadows in the Night	Bob Dylan	Traditional pop
3	Reflection	Fifth Harmony	Pop; R&B
3	Full Speed	Kid Ink	Hip hop
3	Wallflower	Diana Krall	Vocal jazz
3	Afraid of Ghosts	Butch Walker	Alternative rock; pop rock; folk rock
10	Holding All the Roses	Blackberry Smoke	Country rock
10	Face the Fire	Michelle Chamuel	Pop
10	Coming Up for Air	Kodaline	Alternative rock
10	A Quien Quiera Escuchar	Ricky Martin	Latin pop
10	Last Dragon	Sisqó	R&B; Hip-hop
14	Echoes from Forgotten Hearts	Vision Eternel	Ambient rock
17	Transfixiation	A Place to Bury Strangers	Noise rock
17	Smoke + Mirrors	Imagine Dragons	Pop rock; arena rock; alternative rock
17	Love Stuff	Elle King	Alternative rock; indie pop
23	Restarter	Torche	Sludge metal
24	Dope Machines	The Airborne Toxic Event	Electronic rock; indie rock; synth-pop
24	The Order of Things	All That Remains	Melodic metalcore
24	Dark Sky Paradise	Big Sean	Hip-hop
24	Fan of a Fan: The Album	Chris Brown & Tyga	West Coast Hip hop; R&B
24	Just Like You	Falling in Reverse	metalcore; punk rock
24	Just Kids	Mat Kearney	Contemporary Christian music; rock; pop
24	First Kiss	Kid Rock	Blues; Country; country rock; rock and roll; swamp rock
24	Of Beauty and Rage	Red	Alternative rock; Christian rock; alternative metal; symphonic metal
24	Our Own House	MisterWives	Indie pop; pop rock
27	Skrillex and Diplo Present Jack Ü	Jack Ü	EDM

=== March ===
Date	Album	Artist	Genre(s)
3	Cult White Edition	Bayside	Punk rock; alternative rock
3	The Firewatcher's Daughter	Brandi Carlile	Americana; folk rock
3	Piece by Piece	Kelly Clarkson	Power pop; EDM; electropop; orchestral pop
3	The Beast Is G-Unit (EP)	G-Unit	Hip-hop
3	The Neck Is a Bridge to the Body	Kaki King	
3	The Throes of Winter (EP)	Seven Lions	Dubstep
3	Lead Us Back: Songs of Worship	Third Day	Contemporary Christian; Christian rock
10	Spring Break...Checkin' Out (EP)	Luke Bryan	Country
10	Lesser Oceans	Fences	Pop rock; alternative rock; indie rock
10	Rebel Heart	Madonna	Pop
10	The Future Unformed	Sister Machine Gun	Industrial rock
10	Policy	Will Butler	Indie rock; garage rock; indie pop
16	To Pimp a Butterfly	Kendrick Lamar	Hip-hop
17	Run	Awolnation	Electronic rock; alternative rock; synth-pop
17	Little Neon Limelight	Houndmouth	Alternative country; indie pop; indie rock
17	Strangers to Ourselves	Modest Mouse	Indie rock
17	Madness	Sleeping With Sirens	Post-hardcore
23	Mr. Wonderful	Action Bronson	Hip-hop
23	2.0	Big Data	Electropop; alternative dance; indietronica
23	I Don't Like Shit, I Don't Go Outside	Earl Sweatshirt	Hip-hop
23	Time to Go Home	Chastity Belt	Punk rock
24	Dark Energy	Jlin	Footwork; IDM
24	Kidz Bop 28	Kidz Bop Kidz	Children's; pop
24	Lovetap!	Smallpools	Indie pop
31	Day of the Dead	Hollywood Undead	Rap rock; hip-hop; nu metal; alternative rock
31	Kintsugi	Death Cab for Cutie	Indie rock; indie pop; art rock; post-punk revival
31	Pleasure to Meet You	Dead Sara	Hard rock; punk rock
31	Southern Style	Darius Rucker	Country
31	American Nights	Plain White T's	Indie rock; alternative rock
31	Blaster	Scott Weiland and the Wildabouts	Rock
31	The Album About Nothing	Wale	Hip-hop
31	Ludaversal	Ludacris	Hip-hop
31	American Candy	The Maine	Pop rock

=== April ===
Date	Album	Artist	Genre(s)
7	Future Hearts	All Time Low	Pop punk, alternative rock
7	After It All	Delta Rae	Blues rock, country rock
7	My House (EP)	Flo Rida	Hip-hop
7	Into the Wild Life	Halestorm	Rock
7	New Glow	Matt and Kim	Dance-pop, alternative dance
7	What For?	Toro y Moi	Synthpop, chillwave
7	No Pier Pressure	Brian Wilson	Rock, pop
14	Cherry Bomb	Tyler, The Creator	Alternative hip hop
14	Welcome to Los Santos	The Alchemist and Oh No	Hip hop, synthpop, dancehall
14	Instant Gratification	Dance Gavin Dance	Post-hardcore, experimental rock
14	Hey, Killer	Local H	Alternative rock
14	Love Somebody	Reba McEntire	Country
14	Kids in Love	The Mowgli's	Alternative rock, rock
14	Second Hand Heart	Dwight Yoakam	Country
21	Sound & Color	Alabama Shakes	Southern rock, roots rock, blues rock
21	Untethered Moon	Built to Spill	Indie rock
21	Eyes Wide Open	Sabrina Carpenter	Pop, folk rock, folk pop
21	To the Stars	Tom DeLonge	Pop punk, alternative rock, punk rock, acoustic
21	How Do You Feel Now?	Joywave	Indie rock, alternative rock
21	Kindred	Passion Pit	Indie pop, synthpop
21	Foil Deer	Speedy Ortiz	Alternative rock, indie rock, pop punk
21	Love Story	Yelawolf	Hip hop, rap rock
24	Black Is the New Black	Everclear	Alternative rock, hard rock
25	RKS	Rainbow Kitten Surprise	Indie rock
27	Dead Trees	From First to Last	Post-hardcore
28	You Should Be Here	Kehlani	R&B, hip hop
28	Songs of God and Whiskey	The Airborne Toxic Event	Acoustic
28	Suffer in Peace	Tyler Farr	Country
28	Stages	Josh Groban	
28	Jekyll + Hyde	Zac Brown Band	Country, country rock, country pop

=== May ===
Date	Album	Artist	Genre(s)
1	California Nights	Best Coast	Indie pop, alternative rock
4	What Color Is Your Sky	Jason Michael Carroll	Country
4	Jackie	Ciara	R&B; pop; dance
4	The Waterfall	My Morning Jacket	Alternative rock, indie rock
4	Wilder Mind	Mumford & Sons	Alternative rock, folk rock
5	Lost in New York	Penguin Prison	Synth-pop, electropop, indie pop
5	Traveller	Chris Stapleton	Country, southern rock
12	Neon Future II	Steve Aoki	EDM
12	Imbue	The Early November	Alternative rock
12	Trust Fall (Side A) (EP)	Incubus	Alternative rock
12	When the Smoke Clears	Hinder	Hard rock, glam rock, alternative rock
12	The Music of Nashville: Season 3, Volume 2	Nashville cast	Country
12	BUSH	Snoop Dogg	Hip hop, funk
17	Blurryface	Twenty One Pilots	Alternative rock; alternative hip hop; reggae; indie pop; electropop
18	Hollywood: A Story of a Dozen Roses	Jamie Foxx	R&B
18	It's Like You Never Went Away (EP)	Goldroom	Nu-disco, deep house, electropop
18	Coward	Haste the Day	Metalcore, hard rock, Christian metal
18	#1 to Infinity	Mariah Carey	R&B, pop, hip hop, soul
18	True Colors	Zedd	EDM, electro house, progressive house
19	Old Bones	Broadside	Pop punk
19	The Desired Effect	Brandon Flowers	Alternative rock
19	The First Time	Kelsea Ballerini	Country
19	Blurryface	Twenty One Pilots	Indie pop, electropop, reggae, rock
19	Sol Invictus	Faith No More	Alternative metal
19	Rivals	Coal Chamber	Metal
19	Flying Lessons	Fool's Gold	World, tropical, indie rock
19	Drug for the Modern Age	Kopecky	Indie rock
19	The Story So Far	The Story So Far	Pop-punk
22	Forever	Alesso	House
26	American Spring	Anti-Flag	Punk rock
26	At. Long. Last. A$AP	A$AP Rocky	Hip hop
26	Touch Down 2 Cause Hell	Boosie Badazz	Hip hop
26	Out of the Wasteland	Lifehouse	Alternative rock, pop rock, power pop
26	King Gucci	Gucci Man	Hip hop
26	Sylva w/ The Metropole Orchestra	Snarky Puppy	Jazz fusion
26	English Graffiti	The Vaccines	Indie rock, garage rock, post-punk revival
29	In Colour	Jamie xx	Electronica

=== June ===
Date	Album	Artist	Genre(s)
1	Peace Is the Mission	Major Lazer	EDM, trap, dancehall, moombahton
1	Flockaveli 2	Waka Flocka Flame	Hip hop
2	Summer Forever	Billy Currington	Country
2	How Big, How Blue, How Beautiful	Florence + the Machine	Indie rock
2	Four Year Strong	Four Year Strong	Pop punk, melodic hardcore
2	Everything Is 4	Jason Derulo	Dance-pop, R&B
2	Kicker	Zella Day	Pop, indie pop
9	Another Piece of Me	Laura Bell Bundy	Country
9	FFS	FFS	Indie rock, art rock, pop rock, baroque rock, dance-rock
9	Folks Like Us	Montgomery Gentry	Country
9	Drones	Muse	Alternative rock, new prog
9	Beneath the Skin	Of Monsters and Men	Indie folk, indie pop, pop
9	Real Stories of True People Who Kind of Looked Like Monsters	Oso Oso	Emo, pop punk
9	Now That's What I Call Country Volume 8	Various	Country
16	Grand Romantic	Nate Ruess	Indie pop, indie rock
16	The Original High	Adam Lambert	Pop
16	Breathe In. Breathe Out.	Hilary Duff	Pop
16	The Fool	Ryn Weaver	Indie pop, alternative, synthpop, electropop
23	Shadows & Diamonds	Elijah Blake	R&B
23	Feels Like	Bully	Alternative rock, indie rock
23	Pageant Material	Kacey Musgraves	Country
23	Dark Before Dawn	Breaking Benjamin	Alternative metal, post-grunge
23	Coming Home	Leon Bridges	R&B, soul
23	Unbreakable Smile	Tori Kelly	Pop
23	The Gold Album: 18th Dynasty	Tyga	Hip hop
23	Bronco	Canaan Smith	Country
23	Tres Caballeros	The Aristocrats	Jazz fusion
28	No Life for Me	Wavves & Cloud Nothings	Post-punk, indie rock
29	Venus	Joy Williams	Pop rock
29	Dreams Worth More Than Money	Meek Mill	Rap
29	Wildheart	Miguel	R&B
29	The Monsanto Years	Neil Young	Rock
30	About to Get Real	Easton Corbin	Country
30	The Heart Is a Monster	Failure	Alternative rock, post-grunge, space rock
30	The Nothing,Nowhere LP	Nothing,Nowhere	Indie rock, emo rap
30	Sorry State of Mind (EP)	Anthony Raneri	Rock
30	Pull the Thorns from Your Heart	Senses Fail	Metalcore
30	VHS	X Ambassadors	Pop rock, alternative rock

=== July ===
Date	Album	Artist	Genre(s)
10	Mobile Orchestra	Owl City	Electronica, synthpop, EDM
10	Sometime Last Night	R5	Alternative rock, pop rock
10	Black Rose	Tyrese	R&B
10	Ghost Notes	Veruca Salt	Alternative rock
16	Star Wars	Wilco	Alternative rock, indie rock
17	Recreational Love	The Bird and the Bee	Indie pop, synthpop
17	Angels and Alcohol	Alan Jackson	Country
17	Mister Asylum	Highly Suspect	Alternative rock
17	Dale	Pitbull	Rap
17	DS2	Future	Hip hop
17	How Does It Feel	MS MR	Indie pop, indie rock
17	Attitude City	Ninja Sex Party	Comedy rock, synthpop
17	Men Amongst Mountains	The Revivalists	Roots rock, alternative rock
17	White Reaper Does It Again	White Reaper	Garage rock, punk rock
24	Pound Syndrome	Hopsin	Hip hop
24	The Blade	Ashley Monroe	Country
24	Not an Apology	Bea Miller	Pop rock, pop
24	And the Wave Has Two Sides	On An On	Dream pop, indie rock, alternative rock
24	Shockwave Supernova	Joe Satriani	Instrumental rock
24	Woman	Jill Scott	R&B, soul
31	Momentary Masters	Albert Hammond, Jr.	Indie rock, alternative rock
31	Saint Asonia	Saint Asonia	Post-grunge, nu metal, alternative metal, hard rock

=== August ===
Date	Album	Artist	Genre(s)
7	Kill the Lights	Luke Bryan	Country, country pop
7	Compton	Dr. Dre	Hip hop
7	21	Hunter Hayes	Country, country pop
7	Love Is Free	Robyn & La Bagatelle Magique	Pop
14	Psycadelik Thoughtz	B.o.B.	Hip hop
14	Venom	Bullet for My Valentine	Thrash metal, heavy metal, metalcore
14	Vikings	New Politics	Alternative rock
21	E·MO·TION	Carly Rae Jepsen	Pop
21	Immortalized	Disturbed	Heavy metal, alternative metal
21	The Meth Lab	Method Man	Hip hop
21	Wild Ones	Kip Moore	Country
21	Nathaniel Rateliff & the Night Sweats	Nathaniel Rateliff & the Night Sweats	Rock, soul
21	I Cry When I Laugh	Jess Glynne	R&B, house, dance-pop
21	III	JoJo	R&B, pop, dance-pop
21	The Awakening	P.O.D.	Christian metal, nu metal
21	Right Here, Right Now	Jordin Sparks	R&B, pop
21	The Great Unknown	Rob Thomas	Pop rock, alternative rock
25	FRAGMENTS	Mr.Kitty	Synth-pop, New wave music
28	Badlands	Halsey	Electropop, Indie Pop
28	Beauty Behind the Madness	The Weeknd	Pop, R&B, PBR&B
28	Inanimate Objects	Atlas Genius	Indie rock
30	Miley Cyrus & Her Dead Petz	Miley Cyrus	Psychedelic pop, Experimental pop

=== September ===
Date	Album	Artist	Genre(s)
4	Era	Atomic Tom	Indie rock, alternative rock
4	Too	FIDLAR	Punk rock, garage punk
4	Got Your Six	Five Finger Death Punch	Heavy metal
4	Only Way Is Up	K Camp	Hip hop
4	Deeply Rooted	Scarface	Hip hop
4	Rodeo	Travis Scott	Hip hop
4	No Closer to Heaven	The Wonder Years	Emo, pop-punk
11	The Story of Sonny Boy Slim	Gary Clark, Jr.	Blues rock, R&B, neo-soul
11	The Calm Before the Storm	Colton Dixon	Contemporary Christian
11	Illinois	Brett Eldredge	Country
11	So There	Ben Folds	Baroque pop
11	Picking Up the Pieces	Jewel	Country
11	90059	Jay Rock	Hip hop
11	Repentless	Slayer	Thrash metal
11	Between II Worlds	Nero	Electronic rock, dubstep, electro house, big beat
18	Southern Drawl	Alabama	Country
18	Long Live	Atreyu	Metalcore, alternative metal
18	Digital Vein	David Cook	Rock, pop rock, post-grunge
18	Higher Truth	Chris Cornell	Rock
18	In the Cards	Robert DeLong	Electronic, alternative rock
18	Rattle That Lock	David Gilmour	Progressive rock
18	Honeymoon	Lana Del Rey	Dream pop
18	Hysteria	Katharine McPhee	Pop
18	GO:OD AM	Mac Miller	Hip hop
18	Sorry	Meg Myers	Alternative rock, pop rock
18	Threat to Survival	Shinedown	Rock
20	What a Time to Be Alive	Drake & Future	Hip hop
21	1989	Ryan Adams	Rock
25	Dodge and Burn	The Dead Weather	Alternative rock, blues rock
25	Fetty Wap	Fetty Wap	Hip hop, trap, R&B
25	JR JR	JR JR	Indie pop, alternative rock
25	Servant of Love	Patty Griffin	Americana, Folk, folk rock
25	Automatic	Kaskade	Dance, progressive house, deep house
25	Better Nature	Silversun Pickups	Alternative rock, dream pop
25	Tangled Up	Thomas Rhett	Country

=== October ===
Date	Album	Artist	Genre(s)
2	Stories	Avicii	EDM, house
2	Trapsoul	Bryson Tiller	R&B, Hip hop
2	See What You Started by Continuing	Collective Soul	Alternative rock, post-grunge
2	Psychic Warfare	Clutch	Hard rock, stoner rock, blues rock
2	Zipper Down	Eagles of Death Metal	Garage rock, indie rock
2	Unbreakable	Janet Jackson	Pop, R&B
2	Calling All Lovers	Tamar Braxton	R&B
2	Silence in the Snow	Trivium	Heavy metal
2	Golgotha	W.A.S.P.	Heavy metal, hard rock
2	V	Wavves	Alternative rock, indie rock, surf rock
9	If I Should Go Before You	City and Colour	Alternative rock
9	The Documentary 2	The Game	Hip hop
9	Revival	Selena Gomez	Pop
9	35 MPH Town	Toby Keith	Country
9	Black Lines	Mayday Parade	Emo, pop punk, punk rock
9	ASD	A Skylit Drive	Post-hardcore, metalcore
16	The Color Before the Sun	Coheed and Cambria	Progressive rock
16	The Documentary 2.5	The Game	Hip hop
16	Confident	Demi Lovato	Pop
16	General Admission	Machine Gun Kelly	Hip hop
16	Vega Intl. Night School	Neon Indian	Electronic, indie pop
16	Around the World and Back	State Champs	Pop rock, pop punk
16	Holdin' the Bag	The Supersuckers	Rock
23	Sounds Good Feels Good	5 Seconds of Summer	Pop punk
23	Liberman	Vanessa Carlton	Indie pop
23	I Changed a Lot	DJ Khaled	Hip hop
23	Divers	Joanna Newsom	Indie folk, indie pop, chamber folk
23	Reloaded: 20 #1 Hits	Blake Shelton	Country
23	Storyteller	Carrie Underwood	Country
23	Reasons	Omarion	R&B
25	Another Country	Rod Stewart	Rock
29	Embrace	Armin Van Buuren	Trance, progressive house
30	Teens of Style	Car Seat Headrest	Indie rock
30	Def Leppard	Def Leppard	Hard rock
30	The Young Souls	Myka Relocate	Metalcore
30	Wiped Out!	The Neighbourhood	Alternative rock
30	Money Shot	Puscifer	Alternative rock

=== November ===
Date	Album	Artist	Genre(s)
6	Delirium	Ellie Goulding	Pop
6	What's Inside: Songs from Waitress	Sara Bareilles	Pop
6	Get Weird	Little Mix	Pop
6	Heart Blanche	CeeLo Green	R&B
6	Damn Country Music	Tim McGraw	Country
6	Art Angels	Grimes	Synthpop
13	When the Morning Comes	A Great Big World	Pop
13	Surrender	Kutless	Christian rock, hard rock, worship
13	Purpose	Justin Bieber	Pop
13	AQUΛRIA	Boots	Alternative R&B, alternative hip hop
13	Vitals	Mutemath	Synthpop, alternative rock
13	Made in the A.M.	One Direction	Pop
13	The Incredible True Story	Logic	Hip hop
13	Know-It-All	Alessia Cara	Pop
13	I'm Comin' Over	Chris Young	Country
13	Free TC	Ty Dolla $ign	R&B
13	Church in These Streets	Jeezy	Rap
20	25	Adele	Pop
20	Shadow of a Doubt	Freddie Gibbs	Hip hop
20	Suitcase 4: Captain Kangaroo Won the War	Guided By Voices	Lo-fi
25	All American	Nick Carter	Pop
27	White Light	The Corrs	Rock, folk
27	Riot Heart Rebellion	Patent Pending	Pop rock, pop-punk
27	Blueprints	Wage War	Metalcore

=== December ===
Date	Album	Artist	Genre(s)
4	Blue Neighbourhood	Troye Sivan	Electropop, dream pop
4	A Head Full of Dreams	Coldplay	Pop
4	Late Nights	Jeremih	R&B, hip hop
4	Speedin' Bullet 2 Heaven	Kid Cudi	Alternative rock, grunge, punk rock
10	Steel, Wood & Whiskey	Finch	Acoustic
11	right on!	jennylee	New wave
11	Islah	Kevin Gates	Rap
11	The Buffet	R. Kelly	R&B, hip hop
11	Untamed	Cam	Country
18	Purple	Baroness	Alternative metal
18	Hard-Off	Bloodhound Gang	Alternative rock, rap rock
18	Royalty	Chris Brown	R&B
18	Tell Me I'm Pretty	Cage the Elephant	Alternative rock
18	Code Red	Monica	R&B
18	King Push – Darkest Before Dawn: The Prelude	Pusha T	Hip hop

== Top songs on record ==
=== Billboard Hot 100 No. 1 Songs ===
- "Bad Blood" – Taylor Swift feat. Kendrick Lamar (1 week)
- "Blank Space" – Taylor Swift (5 weeks in 2014, 2 weeks in 2015)
- "Can't Feel My Face" – The Weeknd (3 weeks)
- "Cheerleader" – OMI (6 weeks)
- "Hello" – Adele (7 weeks)
- "The Hills" – The Weeknd (6 weeks)
- "See You Again" – Wiz Khalifa feat. Charlie Puth (12 weeks)
- "Uptown Funk" – Mark Ronson feat. Bruno Mars (14 weeks)
- "What Do You Mean?" – Justin Bieber (1 week)

=== Billboard Hot 100 Top 20 Hits ===
All songs that reached the Top 20 on the Billboard Hot 100 chart during the year, complete with peak chart placement.

- "679" – Fetty Wap feat. Remy Boyz (#4)
- "7/11" – Beyoncé (#13 in 2014, #18 in 2015)
- "All About That Bass" – Meghan Trainor (#1 in 2014, #5 in 2015)
- "All Day" – Kanye West feat. Theophilus London, Allan Kingdom and Paul McCartney (#15)
- "Animals" – Maroon 5 (#3 in 2014, #8 in 2015)
- "Antidote" – Travis Scott (#16)
- "Bad Blood" – Taylor Swift feat. Kendrick Lamar (#1)
- "Bang Bang" – Jessie J, Ariana Grande and Nicki Minaj (#3 in 2014, #15 in 2015)
- "Bitch Better Have My Money" – Rihanna (#15)
- "Blank Space" – Taylor Swift (#1)
- "Can't Feel My Face" – The Weeknd (#1)
- "Centuries" – Fall Out Boy (#10)
- "Chains" – Nick Jonas (#13)
- "Chandelier" – Sia (#8 in 2014, #20 in 2015)
- "Cheerleader" – OMI (#1)
- "CoCo" – O.T. Genasis (#20)
- "Cool for the Summer" – Demi Lovato (#11)
- "Dear Future Husband" – Meghan Trainor (#14)
- "Don't" – Bryson Tiller (#20)
- "Don't" – Ed Sheeran (#9 in 2014, #19 in 2015)
- "Downtown" – Macklemore & Ryan Lewis feat. Eric Nally, Melle Mel, Kool Moe Dee and Grandmaster Caz (#12)
- "Drag Me Down" – One Direction (#3)
- "Earned It" – The Weeknd (#3)
- "Elastic Heart" – Sia (#17)
- "Ex's & Oh's" – Elle King (#10)
- "Fight Song" – Rachel Platten (#6)
- "Focus" – Ariana Grande (#7)
- "FourFiveSeconds" – Rihanna, Kanye West and Paul McCartney (#4)
- "G.D.F.R." – Flo Rida feat. Sage the Gemini and Lookas (#8)
- "Girl Crush" – Little Big Town (#18)
- "Good for You" – Selena Gomez feat. ASAP Rocky (#5)
- "Habits (Stay High)" – Tove Lo (#3 in 2014, #16 in 2015)
- "Hello" – Adele (#1)
- "Here" – Alessia Cara (#7)
- "Hey Mama" – David Guetta feat. Nicki Minaj, Bebe Rexha and Afrojack (#8)
- "Hit the Quan" – iLoveMemphis (#15)
- "Honey, I'm Good" – Andy Grammer (#9)
- "Hotline Bling" – Drake (#2)
- "I Don't Fuck with You" – Big Sean feat. E-40 (#11 in 2014, #12 in 2015)
- "I Don't Mind" – Usher feat. Juicy J (#11)
- "I Want You to Know" – Zedd feat. Selena Gomez (#17)
- "I'll Show You" – Justin Bieber (#19)
- "I'm Not the Only One" – Sam Smith (#5)
- "In the Night" – The Weeknd (#20)
- "Jealous" – Nick Jonas (#7)
- "Jumpman" – Drake and Future (#14)
- "Lay Me Down" – Sam Smith (#8)
- "Lean On" – Major Lazer and DJ Snake feat. MØ (#4)
- "Like I'm Gonna Lose You" – Meghan Trainor feat. John Legend (#8)
- "Lips Are Movin" – Meghan Trainor (#4)
- "Locked Away" – R. City feat. Adam Levine (#6)
- "Love Me Harder" – Ariana Grande and The Weeknd (#7)
- "Love Me Like You Do" – Ellie Goulding (#3)
- "Love Yourself" – Justin Bieber (#3)
- "My Way" – Fetty Wap feat. Monty (#7)
- "Nasty Freestyle" – T-Wayne (#9)
- "No Type" – Rae Sremmurd (#16 in 2014, #18 in 2015)
- "On My Mind" – Ellie Goulding (#13)
- "One Last Time" – Ariana Grande (#13)
- "Only" – Nicki Minaj feat. Drake, Lil Wayne and Chris Brown (#12 in 2014, #15 in 2015)
- "Perfect" – One Direction (#10)
- "Piece by Piece" – Kelly Clarkson (#8)
- "Photograph" – Ed Sheeran (#10)
- "Post to Be" – Omarion feat. Chris Brown and Jhené Aiko (#13)
- "Renegades" – X Ambassadors (#17)
- "Same Old Love" – Selena Gomez (#6)
- "See You Again" – Wiz Khalifa feat. Charlie Puth (#1)
- "Shake It Off" – Taylor Swift (#1 in 2014, #5 in 2015)
- "She Knows" – Ne-Yo feat. Juicy J (#19)
- "Shut Up and Dance" – Walk the Moon (#4)
- "Somebody" – Natalie La Rose feat. Jeremih (#10)
- "Sorry" – Justin Bieber (#2)
- "Stay with Me" – Sam Smith (#2 in 2014, #11 in 2015)
- "Stitches" – Shawn Mendes (#4)
- "Style" – Taylor Swift (#6)
- "Sugar" – Maroon 5 (#2)
- "Take Me to Church" – Hozier (#2)
- "Take Your Time" – Sam Hunt (#20)
- "Talking Body" – Tove Lo (#12)
- "Tennessee Whiskey" – Chris Stapleton (#20)
- "The Hanging Tree" – James Newton Howard feat. Jennifer Lawrence (#12 in 2014, #13 in 2015)
- "The Heart Wants What It Wants" – Selena Gomez (#6 in 2014, #13 in 2015)
- "The Hills" – The Weeknd (#1)
- "Thinking Out Loud" – Ed Sheeran (#2)
- "Time of Our Lives" – Pitbull feat. Ne-Yo (#9)
- "Trap Queen" – Fetty Wap (#2)
- "Truffle Butter" – Nicki Minaj feat. Drake and Lil Wayne (#14)
- "Tuesday" – ILoveMakonnen feat. Drake (#12 in 2014, #15 in 2015)
- "Uptown Funk" – Mark Ronson feat. Bruno Mars (#1)
- "Want to Want Me" – Jason Derulo (#5)
- "Wasted Love" – Matt McAndrew (#14)
- "Watch Me" – Silentó (#3)
- "Waves" – Mr. Probz (#14 in 2014, #18 in 2015)
- "What Do You Mean?" – Justin Bieber (#1)
- "Where Are U Now" – Skrillex and Diplo feat. Justin Bieber (#8)
- "Wildest Dreams" – Taylor Swift (#5)
- "Worth It" – Fifth Harmony feat. Kid Ink (#12)
- "You Know You Like It" – DJ Snake and AlunaGeorge (#13)

== Deaths ==
- January 1 – Jeff Golub, 59, jazz guitarist
- January 2 – Little Jimmy Dickens, 94, country singer
- January 4 – Lance Diamond, 72, singer
- January 8
  - Andraé Crouch, 72, gospel singer-songwriter and producer
  - Curtis Lee, 75, singer-songwriter
- January 10
  - Tim Drummond, 75, rock bass player and songwriter
  - George Probert, 87, jazz saxophonist and clarinet player (Firehouse Five Plus Two)
- January 12
  - Frank Glazer, 99, pianist and composer
  - A. J. Masters, 64, singer-songwriter and guitarist
- January 15
  - Ervin Drake, 95, songwriter
  - Kim Fowley, 75, singer-songwriter, producer, and manager
- January 18
  - Cynthia Layne, 51, jazz singer-songwriter
  - Dallas Taylor, 66, rock drummer (Manassas, Clear Light)
- January 19
  - John Bilezikjian, 66, oud player
  - Ward Swingle, 87, jazz singer (Les Double Six)
- January 20 – Rose Marie McCoy, 92, songwriter
- January 27 – Neil LeVang, 83, guitarist and banjo player
- January 29 – Rod McKuen, 81, singer-songwriter
- January 31 – Don Covay, 76, singer-songwriter
- February 1 – Anita Darian, 87, soprano
- February 2
  - Joseph Alfidi, 65, pianist, composer, and conductor
  - The Jacka, 37, rapper (Mob Figaz)
  - Zane Musa, 36, saxophonist
- February 3
  - Mary Healy, 96, variety entertainer, singer, and actress
  - William Thomas McKinley, 76, pianist and composer
- February 7 – Joe B. Mauldin, 74, bass player (The Crickets)
- February 8 – Keith Knudsen, 56, singer-songwriter and drummer
- February 9 – Marvin David Levy, 82, composer
- February 12
  - Sam Andrew, 73, singer-songwriter and guitarist (Big Brother and the Holding Company)
  - John-Edward Kelly, 56, saxophonist and conductor
  - Mosie Lister, 93, singer-songwriter (The Statesmen Quartet)
  - Richie Pratt, 71, jazz drummer and composer
- February 14 – Hulon, 58, jazz saxophonist
- February 16 – Lesley Gore, 68, singer-songwriter
- February 18 – Dave Cloud, 58, singer-songwriter
- February 21 – Clark Terry, 94, jazz trumpeter and composer
- February 23 – Ron Edgar, 68, drummer (The Music Machine)
- February 24 – Robert Belfour, 74, blues singer-songwriter and guitarist
- February 27 – Tod Dockstader, 82, composer
- February 28 – Ezra Laderman, 90, classical composer
- March 1 – Orrin Keepnews, 91, record producer, co-founded Riverside Records
- March 8 – Lew Soloff, 71, trumpet player and composer (Blood, Sweat & Tears and Mingus Big Band)
- March 9
  - Jerry Brightman, 61, guitarist (The Buckaroos)
  - Wayne Kemp, 73, country singer and guitarist
- March 11 – Jimmy Greenspoon, 67, singer-songwriter and keyboard player (Three Dog Night)
- March 15 – Mike Porcaro, 59, rock bass player (Toto)
- March 16
  - Bruce Crump, 57, rock drummer (Molly Hatchet and Gator Country)
  - Don Robertson, 92, pianist and songwriter
- March 18 – Samuel Charters, 85, record producer
- March 19 – Michael Brown, 65, keyboard player and songwriter (The Left Banke)
- March 20
  - Paul Jeffrey, 81, jazz saxophonist
  - A. J. Pero, 55, rock drummer (Twisted Sister and Adrenaline Mob)
- March 21 – Miriam Bienstock, 92, record executive
- March 22 – Norman Scribner, 79, pianist, composer, and conductor
- March 24 – Scott Clendenin, 48, bass player (Death and Control Denied)
- March 27
  - B.J. Crosby, 63, jazz singer
  - Johnny Helms, 80, jazz trumpet player and bandleader
- March 30 – Preston Ritter, 65, drummer (The Electric Prunes)
- March 31 – Ralph Sharon, 91, pianist, composer, and conductor
- April 1 – Billy Butler, 69, soul singer-songwriter and guitarist
- April 2 – Doug Sax, 78, sound engineer
- April 3 – Bob Burns, 64, rock drummer (Lynyrd Skynyrd)
- April 5
  - Richard LaSalle, 97, pianist and composer
  - Julie Wilson, 90, singer
- April 6
  - Ray Charles, 96, singer-songwriter and conductor
  - Milton DeLugg, 96, jazz accordion player and composer
- April 7 – Stan Freberg, 88, recording artist
- April 9 – Tut Taylor, 91, bluegrass guitarist (Dixie Gentlemen)
- April 10 – Keith McCormack, 74, singer-songwriter and guitarist
- April 14 – Percy Sledge, 74, singer
- April 15 – Billy Ray Hearn, 85, record executive, founded Sparrow Records and Myrrh Records
- April 16 – Johnny Kemp, 55, singer
- April 19 – Bernard Stollman, 85, record executive, founded ESP-Disk
- April 21 – Wally Lester, 73, singer (The Skyliners)
- April 24 – Sid Tepper, 96, songwriter
- April 27
  - Jack Ely, 71, singer and guitarist (The Kingsmen)
  - Marty Napoleon, 93, jazz pianist
- April 30 – Ben E. King, 76, singer-songwriter and producer (The Drifters)
- May 1 – Grace Lee Whitney, 85, singer
- May 2 – Guy Carawan, 87, singer and musicologist
- May 5 – Craig Gruber, 63, bass player (Rainbow, Elf, Bible Black, and Raven Lord)
- May 6 – Jerome Cooper, 68, jazz drummer
- May 9 – Johnny Gimble, 88, singer-songwriter and fiddler
- May 10 – Victor Salvi, 95, classical harpist
- May 11 – Stan Cornyn, 81, record executive
- May 12 – Bobby Jameson, 70, singer-songwriter
- May 13 – Robert Drasnin, 87, clarinet player and composer
- May 14 – B.B. King, 89, blues singer-songwriter, guitarist, and producer
- May 15 – Ortheia Barnes, 70, singer
- May 17
  - Chinx, 31, rapper
  - Tranquility Bass, 47, rapper
- May 18 – Elbert West, 47, country singer-songwriter
- May 19 – Bruce Lundvall, 79, record executive
- May 20 – Bob Belden, 58, saxophonist, composer, conductor, and producer
- May 21 – Louis Johnson, 60, bass player (The Brothers Johnson)
- May 24 – Marcus Belgrave, 78, jazz trumpet player
- May 26
  - Rocky Frisco, 77, pianist
  - Art Thieme, 73, folk singer
- May 28 – Steven Gerber, 66, composer
- May 30 – Jim Bailey, 77, singer
- May 31
  - Nico Castel, 83, tenor
  - Will Holt, 86, singer-songwriter
  - Slim Richey, 77, jazz guitarist and fiddler
- June 1 – Jean Ritchie, 92, folk singer-songwriter
- June 6 – Ronnie Gilbert, 88, folk singer-songwriter (The Weavers)
- June 8 – Paul Bacon, 91, jazz musician
- June 9 – Pumpkinhead, 39, rapper
- June 11
  - Jim Ed Brown, 81, country singer-songwriter (The Browns)
  - Ornette Coleman 85, jazz saxophonist, violinist, trumpet player, and composer
- June 12 – Monica Lewis, 93, singer
- June 13
  - Buddy Boudreaux, 97, jazz saxophonist and clarinet player
  - Big Time Sarah, 62, blues singer
- June 16 – Mighty Sam McClain, 72, singer-songwriter
- June 19 – Harold Battiste, 83, saxophonist, pianist, and composer
- June 21 – Gunther Schuller, 89, horn player, composer, and conductor
- June 22
  - Joseph de Pasquale, 95, viola player
  - James Horner, 61, composer and conductor
- June 27 – Chris Squire, 67, singer-songwriter and bass player (Yes, Conspiracy, The Syn, and XYZ)
- July 1 – Red Lane, 76, country singer-songwriter
- July 2 – Roy C. Bennett, 96, songwriter
- July 6
  - Julio Angel, 69, singer
  - Camille Bob, 77, singer and drummer
- July 8 – Ernie Maresca, 76, singer-songwriter and producer (The Regents)
- July 9 – Michael Masser, 74, songwriter and producer
- July 10
  - Hussein Fatal, 38, rapper (Outlawz)
  - Jon Vickers, 88, opera singer
- July 11 – Joey Robinson, Jr., 53, Sugar Hill Records executive (West Street Mob)
- July 13 – Arthur G. Wright, 78, soul guitarist
- July 14 – Dave Somerville, 81, singer (The Diamonds)
- July 15
  - Alan Curtis, 80, harpsichord player and conductor
  - Howard Rumsey, 97, jazz bassist
- July 18 – Buddy Buie, 74, songwriter and producer
- July 19
  - Van Alexander, 100, composer and bandleader
  - Carmino Ravosa, 85, pianist and composer
- July 20 – Wayne Carson, 72, singer-songwriter and producer
- July 21
  - Mitch Aliotta, 71, bass player (Rotary Connection and Aliotta Haynes Jeremiah)
  - Theodore Bikel, 91, folk singer-songwriter
  - Paul Freeman, 79, conductor
  - Justin Lowe, 32, metal guitarist (After the Burial)
- July 22
  - Don Joyce, 71, singer (Negativland)
  - Daron Norwood, 49, country singer-songwriter
- July 26
  - Bobbi Kristina Brown, 22, singer
  - Vic Firth, 85, drummer
- July 27 – Rickey Grundy, 56, gospel singer-songwriter
- July 29 – Buddy Emmons, 78, guitarist
- July 30 – Lynn Anderson, 67, country singer
- July 31 – Pamela Brandt, 68, country-rock bassist, singer and songwriter (The Deadly Nightshade)
- August 2 – J. Durward Morsch, 94, trombonist and composer
- August 4 – Billy Sherrill, 78, songwriter and producer
- August 5 – Raphy Leavitt, 66, composer and conductor
- August 8 – Sean Price, 43, rapper (Boot Camp Clik and Heltah Skeltah)
- August 11 – Eddie Cusic, 89, blues singer-songwriter and guitarist
- August 13 – Harold Ousley, 86, saxophonist and flute player
- August 14 – Bob Johnston, 83 record producer
- August 15 – Danny Sembello, 52, songwriter and producer
- August 27 – George Cleve, 79, conductor
- September 1 – Boomer Castleman, 70, singer-songwriter and guitarist
- September 2 – Brianna Lea Pruett, 32, singer-songwriter
- September 5 – Frederick "Dennis" Greene, 66, singer (Sha Na Na)
- September 7 – Susan Allen, 64, harp player
- September 13 – Gary Richrath, 65, guitarist and songwriter (REO Speedwagon)
- September 16 – Peggy Jones, 75, guitarist
- September 18 – Daniel Kyre, 21, guitarist (Cyndago)
- September 21 – Ben Cauley, 76, trumpet player and songwriter (The Bar-Kays)
- September 27
  - Wilton Felder, 75, saxophonist and bass player (The Crusaders)
  - Denise Lor, 86, singer
- September 28 – Frankie Ford, 76, singer
- September 29
  - Benjamin Hutto, 67, conductor
  - Phil Woods, 83, saxophonist and composer
- October 2 – Willie Akins, 76, jazz saxophonist
- October 4 – Dave Pike, 77, vibraphone player and composer
- October 6
  - Smokey Johnson, 78, drummer
  - Billy Joe Royal, 73, pop and country singer
- October 9
  - Koopsta Knicca, 40, rapper (Three 6 Mafia)
  - Larry Rosen, 75, jazz producer
- October 10
  - Steve Mackay, 66, saxophonist (The Stooges)
  - Robbin Thompson, 66, singer-songwriter (Steel Mill)
- October 11 – Smokin' Joe Kubek, 58, guitarist and songwriter
- October 13 – Skatemaster Tate, 56, singer and producer
- October 16 – John Jennings, 61, guitarist and producer
- October 18 – Frank Watkins, 47, bass player (Gorgoroth and Obituary)
- October 20 – Cory Wells, 74, singer (Three Dog Night)
- October 22 – Mark Murphy, 83, singer-songwriter
- October 23 – Leon Bibb, 93, folk singer
- October 25 – Lee Shaw, 89, pianist and composer
- October 26 – David Rodriguez, 63, singer-songwriter
- October 27 – Herbie Goins, 76, R&B singer (Blues Incorporated)
- November 2
  - Tommy Overstreet, 78, country singer-songwriter and guitarist
  - David Stock, 76, composer and conductor
- November 6 – Chuck Pyle, 70, country-folk singer-songwriter
- November 7 – Eddie Hoh, 71, drummer
- November 10
  - Robert Craft, 92 conductor
  - Allen Toussaint, 77, singer-songwriter, pianist, and producer
- November 15 – P. F. Sloan, 70, singer-songwriter
- November 16 – Betty Ann Grove, 86, singer
- November 17
  - Al Aarons, 83, trumpet player (Count Basie Orchestra)
  - David VanLanding, 51, singer (Michael Schenker Group)
- November 18 – Daniel Ferro, 94 opera singer
- November 21 – Joseph Silverstein, 83, violinist and conductor
- November 23 – Cynthia Robinson, 71, trumpet player and singer (Sly and the Family Stone)
- November 26 – Ronnie Bright, 77, singer (The Cadillacs and The Coasters)
- November 29 – Buddy Moreno, 103, singer
- December 1 – Shirley Gunter, 81, R&B singer-songwriter
- December 2
  - John Eaton, 85, composer
  - Wally Roker, 78, singer (The Heartbeats)
- December 3 – Scott Weiland, 48, rock singer-songwriter (Stone Temple Pilots, Velvet Revolver, and The Wondergirls)
- December 8
  - Mattiwilda Dobbs, 90, soprano
  - Bonnie Lou, 91, country singer-songwriter
  - Gary Marker, 72, bass player (Rising Sons)
- December 9 – Rusty Jones, 73, jazz drummer
- December 13 – Luigi Creatore, 92, songwriter and producer
- December 14 – Edmund Lyndeck, 90, singer
- December 16 – Snuff Garrett, 77, record producer
- December 19 – Kurt Masur, 88, conductor (New York Philharmonic)
- December 21 – Sam Dockery, 86, jazz pianist
- December 24 – William Guest, 74, R&B singer (Gladys Knight & the Pips)
- December 28
  - Joe Houston, 89, saxophonist
  - Lemmy Kilmister, 70, cancer
- December 31
  - Natalie Cole, 65, singer-songwriter
  - Marion James, 81, blues singer-songwriter

== See also ==
- 2010s in music
- 2015 in music
