= Fetty Wap discography =

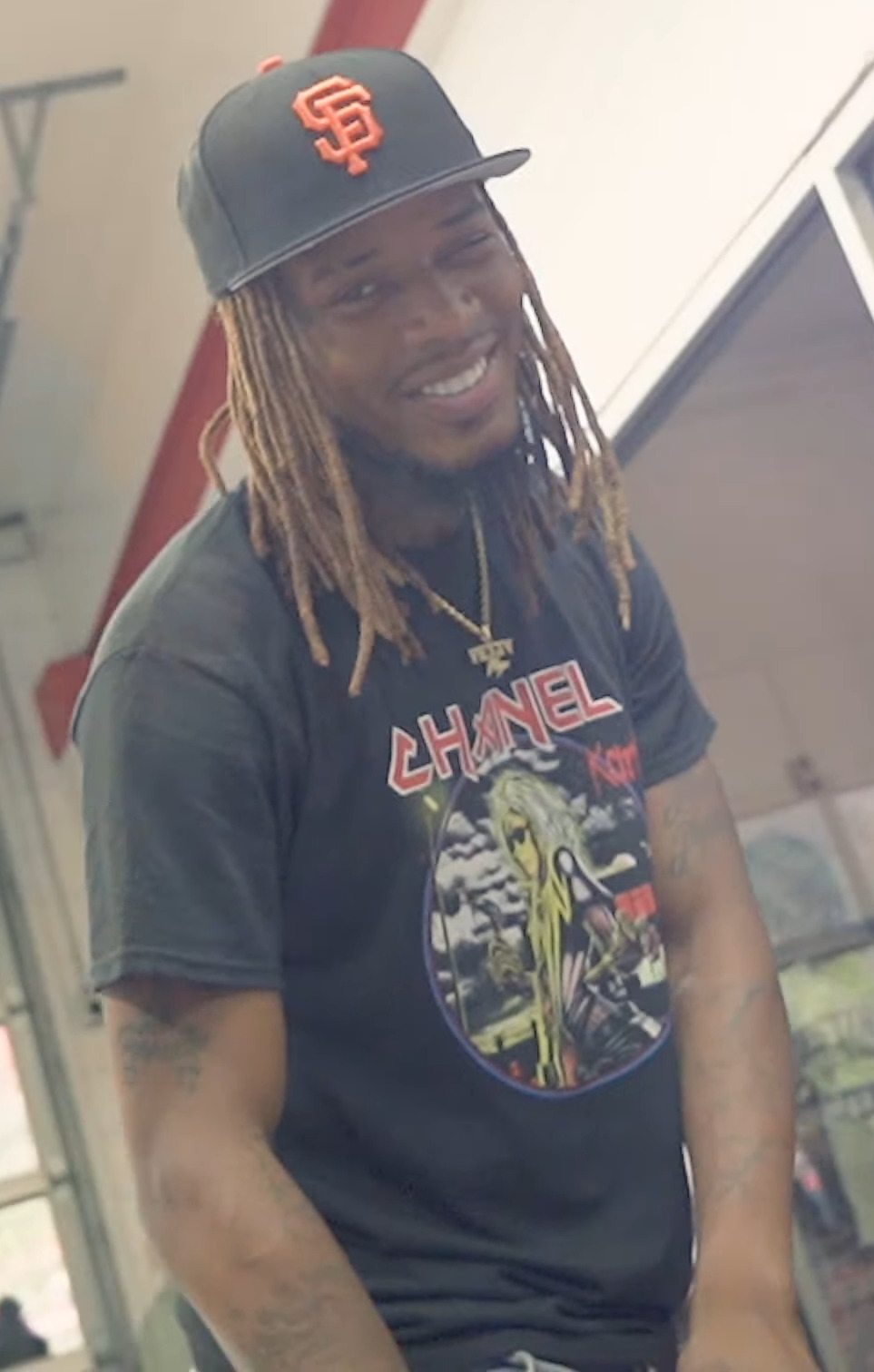
- Fetty Wap in 2019
- Studio albums: 4
- EPs: 2
- Singles: 67
- Mixtapes: 12

American rapper Fetty Wap has released four studio albums, two extended plays, twelve mixtapes, 68 singles (including twenty-eight as a featured artist), and six promotional singles.

== Albums ==
=== Studio albums ===
Title	Album details	Peak chart positions										Sales	Certifications
Title	Album details	US	US R&B /HH	AUS	CAN	FRA	IRE	NL	NZ	SWI	UK	Sales	Certifications
Fetty Wap	Released: September 25, 2015; Label: RGF, 300; Format: CD, LP, digital download, streaming	1	1	13	13	57	56	73	30	81	15	US: 300,000 (Note: Sales as of 2016.)	RIAA: 3× Platinum; BPI: Gold
The Butterfly Effect	Released: October 22, 2021; Label: RGF, 300; Format: Digital download, streaming	—	—	—	—	—	—	—	—	—	—		
King Zoo	Released: November 24, 2023; Label: RGF, 300; Format: Digital download, streaming	—	—	—	—	—	—	—	—	—	—		
Zavier	Released: March 27, 2026; Label: RGF, 300; Format: Digital download, streaming	169	—	—	—	—	—	—	—	—	—		

=== Compilation albums ===
Title	Album details	Peak chart positions		
Title	Album details	US	US R&B	US Rap
RGF Island, Vol. 1 (with RGF)	Released: June 17, 2016; Label: RGF; Format: CD, digital download	198	40	39

== Extended plays ==
Title	EP details
For My Fans	Released: December 1, 2015; Format: Digital download
Lucky No. 7	Released: June 7, 2017; Format: Digital download

== Mixtapes ==
Title	Mixtape details
Up Next (with DJ Louie Styles)	Released: July 31, 2014; Format: Digital download
Zoo Style (with DJ Louie Styles)	Released: February 22, 2015; Format: Digital download
Coke Zoo (with French Montana)	Released: October 26, 2015; Format: Digital download
Zoo '16	Released: February 2, 2016; Format: Digital download
Money, Hoes & Flows (with PnB Rock)	Released: July 12, 2016; Format: Digital download
Zoovier	Released: November 21, 2016; Format: Digital download
For My Fans 2	Released: October 15, 2017; Format: Digital download
For My Fans 3: The Final Chapter	Released: January 19, 2018; Format: Digital download
Bruce Wayne	Released: June 7, 2018; Format: Digital download
Skinny wit the Zoo' (with Skinnyfromthe9)	Released: June 28, 2019; Format: Digital download
Trap & B	Released: February 14, 2020; Format: Digital download
Big Zoovie	Released: June 21, 2020; Format: Digital download
You Know the Vibes	Released: December 12, 2020; Format: Digital download

== Singles ==
=== As lead artist ===
Title	Year	Peak chart positions										Certifications	Album
Title	Year	US	US R&B /HH	AUS	CAN	DEN	IRE	NL	NZ	SWI	UK	Certifications	Album
"Trap Queen"	2014	2	2	25	11	8	26	36	13	55	8	RIAA: 12× Platinum; FIMI: Gold; ARIA: Platinum; BPI: 3× Platinum; IFPI DEN: Platinum; RMNZ: 5× Platinum	Fetty Wap
"679" (featuring Remy Boyz)	2015	4	3	19	15	—	41	67	12	65	20	RIAA: 9× Platinum; ARIA: Gold; BPI: 2× Platinum; FIMI: Gold; RMNZ: 4× Platinum	Fetty Wap
"My Way" (featuring Monty)	2015	7	5	94	32	—	—	—	—	—	80	RIAA: 4× Platinum; BPI: Gold; RMNZ: Gold	Fetty Wap
"Again"	2015	33	11	63	71	—	—	—	15	—	79	RIAA: 5× Platinum; BPI: Platinum; RMNZ: 3× Platinum	Fetty Wap
"Merry Xmas" (featuring Monty)	2015	—	—	—	—	—	—	—	—	—	—		Non-album singles
"Jimmy Choo"	2016	65	19	—	—	—	—	—	—	—	—	RIAA: Platinum	Non-album singles
"Wake Up"	2016	50	15	—	—	—	—	—	—	—	—	RIAA: Platinum	Non-album singles
"My Environment"	2016	—	—	—	—	—	—	—	—	—	—		Non-album singles
"Queen of the Zoo"	2016	—	—	—	—	—	—	—	—	—	—		Non-album singles
"Westside" (featuring Snoop Dogg)	2016	—	—	—	—	—	—	—	—	—	—		Non-album singles
"Different Now"	2016	—	—	—	—	—	—	—	—	—	—		Non-album singles
"Make You Feel Good"	2016	—	—	—	—	—	—	—	—	—	—	RMNZ: Platinum	Non-album singles
"Like a Star" (featuring Nicki Minaj)	2016	—	— (Note: "Like a Star" did not enter the Hot R&B/Hip-Hop Songs chart, but peaked at number nine on the Bubbling Under R&B/Hip-Hop Singles chart.)	—	86	—	—	—	—	—	—		Non-album singles
"With You"	2017	—	—	—	—	—	—	—	—	—	—		Non-album singles
"Way You Are" (featuring Monty)	2017	—	—	—	—	—	—	—	—	—	—		Non-album singles
"Flip Phone"	2017	—	—	—	—	—	—	—	—	—	—		Non-album singles
"Aye"	2017	—	—	—	—	—	—	—	—	—	—		Non-album singles
"Got a Thang"	2017	—	—	—	—	—	—	—	—	—	—		Lucky No. 7
"Dont Know What to Do"	2017	—	—	—	—	—	—	—	—	—	—		Lucky No. 7
"There She Go" (featuring Monty)	2017	—	—	—	—	—	—	—	—	—	—		Non-album single
"Keke" (with 6ix9ine and A Boogie wit da Hoodie)	2018	43	24	—	37	—	—	—	—	—	98	RIAA: Gold; BPI: Silver; RMNZ: Gold	Day69
"KissWowie"	2018	—	—	—	—	—	—	—	—	—	—		Non-album single
"Love The Way"	2018	—	—	—	—	—	—	—	—	—	—		For My Fans 3: The Final Chapter
"Westin"	2018	—	—	—	—	—	—	—	—	—	—		Bruce Wayne
"Trap God"	2019	—	—	—	—	—	—	—	—	—	—		Non-album singles
"Trippin Baby"	2019	—	—	—	—	—	—	—	—	—	—		Non-album singles
"Hold On"	2019	—	—	—	—	—	—	—	—	—	—		Non-album singles
"Thug Lovin"	2019	—	—	—	—	—	—	—	—	—	—		Non-album singles
"Birthday" (featuring Monty)	2019	—	—	—	—	—	—	—	—	—	—		Non-album singles
"Zoo" (featuring Tee Grizzley)	2019	—	—	—	—	—	—	—	—	—	—		Non-album singles
"Brand New"	2019	—	—	—	—	—	—	—	—	—	—		Non-album singles
"Fresh N Clean"	2019	—	—	—	—	—	—	—	—	—	—		Non-album singles
"Everyday"	2020	—	—	—	—	—	—	—	—	—	—		Non-album singles
"Pretty Thang"	2020	—	—	—	—	—	—	—	—	—	—		Non-album singles
"Speed"	2020	—	—	—	—	—	—	—	—	—	—		You Know the Vibes
"Way Past 12" (featuring Monty)	2020	—	—	—	—	—	—	—	—	—	—		You Know the Vibes
"Klassic"	2021	—	—	—	—	—	—	—	—	—	—		You Know the Vibes
"Leck" (with Imanbek and Morgenshtern featuring KDDK)	2021	—	—	—	—	—	—	—	—	—	—		Non-album single
"Sweet Yamz"	2022	— (Note: "Sweet Yamz" did not enter the Billboard Hot 100 chart, but peaked at number 19 on the Bubbling Under Hot 100 Singles chart.)	48	—	—	—	—	—	— (Note: "Sweet Yamz" did not enter the NZ Top 40 Singles Chart, but peaked at number six on the NZ Hot Singles Chart.)	—	—		King Zoo
"Tonight"	2023	—	—	—	—	—	—	—	—	—	—		Non-album singles
"Forever (71943509)"	2025	—	—	—	—	—	—	—	—	—	—		Non-album singles
"Right Back to You"	2026	—	—	—	—	—	—	—	— (Note: "Right Back to You" did not enter the NZ Top 40 Singles Chart, but peaked at number 23 on the NZ Hot Singles Chart.)	—	—		Zavier
"Wild Roses" (featuring Divinity & Ymanie)	2026	—	—	—	—	—	—	—	—	—	—		Zavier
"I Remember" (featuring G Herbo)	2026	—	—	—	—	—	—	—	—	—	—		Zavier
"—" denotes a recording that did not chart or was not released in that territory.

=== As featured artist ===
Title	Year	Peak chart positions										Certifications	Album
Title	Year	US	US R&B /HH	AUS	CAN	DEN	IRE	NL	NZ	SWI	UK	Certifications	Album
"Roll Up" (Steve Stylez featuring Fetty Wap and Mike Rosa)	2014	—	—	—	—	—	—	—	—	—	—		Non-album singles
"Lit" (Steve Stylez featuring Fetty Wap, Mike Rosa, and D Millz)	2014	—	—	—	—	—	—	—	—	—	—		Non-album singles
"Buddy" (J.Y. featuring Fetty Wap)	2014	—	—	—	—	—	—	—	—	—	—		Non-album singles
"That Work" (Dylie Dollas featuring Fetty Wap)	2015	—	—	—	—	—	—	—	—	—	—		Non-album singles
"Ice Cream" (Audrey Rose featuring Remy Ma and Fetty Wap)	2015	—	—	—	—	—	—	—	—	—	—		Chapter One: Guns & Roses
"Keep It 100" (Rich The Kid featuring Fetty Wap)	2015	—	—	—	—	—	—	—	—	—	—		Still on Lock & Flexxin on Purpose
"Promises" (Baauer featuring Fetty Wap and Dubbel Dutch)	2015	—	—	—	—	—	—	—	—	—	—		Songs From Scratch
"Around the World" (Natalie La Rose featuring Fetty Wap)	2015	— (Note: "Around the World" did not enter the US Billboard Hot 100, but peaked at number three on the Bubbling Under Hot 100 Singles chart.)	30	—	—	—	85	—	—	—	14		Non-album single
"Over Night" (Monty featuring Fetty Wap)	2015	—	—	—	—	—	—	—	—	—	—		Zoo Style
"Save Dat Money" (Lil Dicky featuring Fetty Wap and Rich Homie Quan)	2015	71	23	—	54	—	—	—	—	—	—	RIAA: 2× Platinum; RMNZ: Gold	Professional Rapper
"Candy Land" (Justina Valentine featuring Fetty Wap)	2015	—	—	—	—	—	—	—	—	—	—		Scarlet Letter
"Valet" (Remix) (Eric Bellinger featuring 2 Chainz and Fetty Wap)	2015	—	—	—	—	—	—	—	—	—	—	RMNZ: Gold	Cuffing Season, Pt. 2
"Worry Bout It" (Kirko Bangz featuring Fetty Wap)	2015	—	—	—	—	—	—	—	—	—	—		Fallin' Up Mix
"Walk" (Remix) (Kwabs featuring Fetty Wap)	2015	—	—	—	—	—	—	—	—	—	—	BPI: Gold	Love + War
"Nobody's Better" (Suzi featuring Fetty Wap)	2015	—	—	—	—	—	—	—	—	—	—	BPI: Silver; RMNZ: Gold	Non-album single
"Gold Slugs" (DJ Khaled featuring Chris Brown, August Alsina, and Fetty Wap)	2015	— (Note: "Gold Slugs" did not enter the Billboard Hot 100, but peaked at number 19 on the Bubbling Under Hot 100 Singles chart.)	49	—	—	—	—	—	—	—	—	RIAA: Gold; ARIA: Gold; RMNZ: Gold	I Changed a Lot
"When I See Ya" (Ty Dolla Sign featuring Fetty Wap)	2015	—	—	—	—	—	—	—	—	—	—		Free TC
"Bang My Head" (David Guetta featuring Sia and Fetty Wap)	2015	76	—	21	51	38	87	19	17	18	18	RIAA: Gold; BPI: Gold; IFPI SWI: Gold; RMNZ: Platinum	Listen Again
"1Hunnid" (K Camp featuring Fetty Wap)	2015	— (Note: "1Hunnid" did not enter the Billboard Hot 100, but peaked at number 13 on the Bubbling Under Hot 100 Singles chart.)	36	—	—	—	—	—	—	—	—	RIAA: Gold	Only Way Is Up
"Classic" (The Knocks featuring Fetty Wap and POWERS)	2015	—	—	—	—	—	—	—	—	—	—		55
"Promise" (Kid Ink featuring Fetty Wap)	2015	57	19	78	86	—	—	—	—	—	—	RIAA: Platinum; BPI: Silver; RMNZ: Platinum	Summer in the Winter
"All in My Head (Flex)" (Fifth Harmony featuring Fetty Wap)	2016	24	—	19	21	—	27	42	8	—	25	RIAA: Platinum; ARIA: Platinum; BPI: Gold; RMNZ: Platinum	7/27
"The Mack" (Nevada featuring Mark Morrison and Fetty Wap)	2016	—	—	9	79	—	14	46	7	66	14	ARIA: 2× Platinum; BPI: Platinum; RMNZ: 2× Platinum	Non-album single
"Text Ur Number" (DJ Envy featuring Fetty Wap and DJ Sliink)	2017	—	—	—	—	—	—	—	—	—	—		Just A Kid From Queens
"Feels Great" (Cheat Codes featuring Fetty Wap and CVBZ)	2017	—	—	39	—	—	—	—	37	—	—	RIAA: Gold; ARIA: Platinum; RMNZ: Platinum	Non-album singles
"100k" (Just Chase featuring Fetty Wap)	2019	—	—	—	—	—	—	—	—	—	—		Non-album singles
"Firefly" (Drax Project featuring Fetty Wap and AACACIA)	2020	—	—	—	—	—	—	—	27	—	—	RMNZ: Platinum	Non-album singles
"Got Me" (Rhino! featuring Fetty Wap)	2021	—	—	—	—	—	—	—	—	—	—		Non-album singles
"—" denotes a recording that did not chart or was not released in that territory.

=== Promotional singles ===
Title	Year	Peak chart positions		Certifications	Album
Title	Year	US	US R&B /HH	Certifications	Album
"Spaceship" Nikosi (featuring Fetty Wap and North Maine)	2014	—	—		Non-album single
"RGF Island"	2015	57	19	RIAA: 2× Platinum; RMNZ: Gold	Fetty Wap
"Jugg" (featuring Monty)	2015	86	32	RIAA: Platinum	Fetty Wap
"High Thoughts"	2017	—	—		Non-album singles
"Air It Out"	2018	—	—		Non-album singles
"Bruce Wayne"	2018	—	—		Bruce Wayne

== Other charted songs ==
Title	Year	Peak chart positions		Certifications	Album
Title	Year	US	US R&B/HH	Certifications	Album
"How We Do Things" (featuring Monty)	2015	— (Note: "How We Do Things" did not enter the Billboard Hot 100, but peaked at number 14 on the Bubbling Under Hot 100 Singles chart.)	50		Fetty Wap
"Time" (featuring Monty)	2015	—	—	RIAA: Gold	Fetty Wap
"D.A.M."	2015	—	— (Note: "D.A.M." did not enter the US Hot R&B/Hip-Hop Songs chart, but peaked at number three on the Bubbling Under R&B/Hip-Hop Singles chart.)	RIAA: Gold	Fetty Wap
"No Days Off" (featuring Monty)	2015	—	— (Note: "No Days Off" did not enter the Hot R&B/Hip-Hop Songs chart, but peaked at number 10 on the Bubbling Under R&B/Hip-Hop Singles chart.)		Fetty Wap

== Guest appearances ==
Title	Year	Artist(s)	Album
"Tonight" (Remix)	2014	Choo Biggz, 50 Cent, Tank	none
"Spaceship"	2014	Nikosi, Fetty Wap, North Maine	none
"Somebody" (Remix)	2015	Natalie La Rose, Jeremih, Sage the Gemini, Troy Ave	none
"Pretty Girl Dance, Pt. 2"	2015	Yalee	none
"Still Selling Dope"	2015	Gucci Mane	King Gucci
"Young Niggas"	2015	Gucci Mane, Jadakiss	Trapology
"Money"	2015	Lil Silk, D.C. Young Fly	Son of a Hustler 2
"Rollin Dank"	2015	Project Pat, Big Trill	Pistol and a Scale
"I Think I Love Her"	2015	Fat Trel	Georgetown
"Flicka Da Wrist" (Remix)	2015	Chedda Da Connect, Yo Gotti, Boosie Badazz, Boston George	Chedda World: The Album
"Body on Me" (Remix)	2015	Rita Ora, Chris Brown	none
"Your Number" (Remix)	2015	Ayo Jay	none
"Like Me" (Remix)	2015	Lil Durk, Jeremih, Lil Wayne	none
"Tell Me"	2015	Yo Gotti	The Return
"Hell of a Night"	2015	Chris Brown, French Montana	Before the Party
"Andale"	2015	Masika Kalysha	none
"Same Old Love" (Remix)	2015	Selena Gomez	none
"When I See Ya"	2015	Ty Dolla Sign	Free TC
"Not Poppin'"	2015	Monty	Monty Zoo
"6 AM"	2015	Monty	Monty Zoo
"Beat It"	2016	Migos	none
"I Got It"	2016	Sophie Beem	Sophie Beem - EP
"Asking 4 It"	2016	Gwen Stefani	This Is What the Truth Feels Like
"The Agreement"	2016	The Lox, Dyce Payne	Filthy America... It's Beautiful
"Make You Smile"	2016	Bleek Blaze	none
"Right Back"	2016	Monty	Monty Zoo II
"Nun Else"	2016	Monty	none
"Fetti"	2016	Yung Ralph, Young Thug, Lil Uzi Vert	I Am Juugman 2
"Losing Control"	2017	Farruko	TrapXficante
"Jackpot"	2018	Red Cafe, Fabolous	Less Talk More Hustle
"F.L.Y."	2018	De La Ghetto	none
"With U"	2019	Meg Donnelly	none
