= Again (Fetty Wap song) =

Single by Fetty Wap

from the album Fetty Wap
- Released: August 13, 2015
- Recorded: 2014
- Genre: Hip-hop; R&B; trap
- Length: 5:13 (album/single version); 4:20 (radio edit)
- Label: RGF; 300
- Songwriter: Willie Maxwell
- Producers: Peoples; Shy Boogs

Fetty Wap singles chronology
"My Way" (2015)	"Again" (2015)	"Body on Me (Fetty Wap Remix)" (2015)

"Again" is the fourth single by American rapper Fetty Wap from his self-titled debut album. It peaked at number 33 on the Billboard Hot 100. In January 2025, the song began to regain popularity on Instagram Reels and TikTok due to the trend "Blasting Fetty Wap on a JBL".

== Commercial performance ==
"Again" was the highest ranking debut on the Billboard Hot 100 chart dated August 29, 2015, entering at number 33. Its debut was fueled by first-week digital download sales of 88,000 copies. It concurrently debuted at number eight on the Hot Rap Songs chart while Wap's former three singles "Trap Queen", "679", and "My Way" were still in the chart's top ten; this made Fetty Wap the first act in the chart's history to simultaneously chart their first four singles in that region. On the week of February 15, 2025, "Again" re-entered the Billboard Hot 100 for the first time in nearly a decade, at number 41. This was due to the song being used in a viral social media trend. "Again" also reached number one on the TikTok Billboard Top 50 chart.

== Charts ==
=== Weekly charts ===
Chart (2015)	Peak position
Australia (ARIA)	53
Canada Hot 100 (Billboard)	71
New Zealand (Recorded Music NZ)	37
UK Singles (Official Charts)	79
US Billboard Hot 100	33
US Hot R&B/Hip-Hop Songs (Billboard)	12
US Rhythmic Airplay (Billboard)	5

Chart (2025)	Peak position
Global 200 (Billboard)	84
New Zealand (Recorded Music NZ)	15
US Billboard Hot 100	41
US Hot R&B/Hip-Hop Songs (Billboard)	11

=== Year-end charts ===
Chart (2016)	Position
US Hot R&B/Hip-Hop Songs (Billboard)	56
US Rhythmic (Billboard)	40

== Certifications ==
Region	Certification	Certified units/sales
Denmark (IFPI Danmark)	Gold	45,000^{‡}
New Zealand (RMNZ)	3× Platinum	90,000^{‡}
United Kingdom (BPI)	Platinum	600,000^{‡}
United States (RIAA)	5× Platinum	5,000,000^{‡}
^{‡} Sales+streaming figures based on certification alone.
