= My Way (Fetty Wap song) =

Single by Fetty Wap featuring Monty

from the album Fetty Wap
- Released: July 17, 2015
- Genre: Hip-hop; R&B; trap
- Length: 3:34 (single and album version); 4:55 (Drake version)
- Label: RGF; 300
- Songwriters: Willie Maxwell II; Angel Cosme, Jr.
- Producers: NickEBeats; JayFrance

Fetty Wap singles chronology
"679" (2015)	"My Way" (2015)	"Again" (2015)

Monty singles chronology
"679" (2015)	"My Way" (2015)

"My Way" is the third single by American rapper and singer Fetty Wap, featuring Remy Boyz's RGF Productions' member Monty, from Wap's self-titled debut album. It peaked at number seven on the Billboard Hot 100.

As of May 2025, the uploaded music video for the song has amassed 260+ million views. In May 2015, Canadian rapper and singer-songwriter Drake premiered his remix of the song. On July 16, 2015, a remastered version of the original song leaked. This version added new adlibs to the song. The next day, the song was released as a commercial single on iTunes. The final version of the song maintained the new adlibs, but with a slightly altered instrumental.

== Remix ==
A remix of the song featuring Drake was first released in May 2015. Wap retrospectively stated that he initially wanted Monty to take over for Wap on the track, but this didn't end up being the remix uploaded to SoundCloud. Wap also neglected to include the remix on his debut album, which he believed caused strains in his relationship with the rapper.

== Commercial performance ==
On the Billboard Hot 100 chart dated July 18, 2015, "My Way" debuted at number 98 on the list. Three weeks later, following its release to digital retailers, the song jumped 80 positions from 87 to number 7, fueled by 152,000 first-week sales and 6.6 million domestic streams. The song's jump into the top ten made Wap the third artist to have two concurrent top ten hits in the year 2015—his prior single "Trap Queen" was ranked number six that week—as well as the first male rapper to have two concurrent top ten hits as a lead artist since 2011, when Lil Wayne accomplished the feat.

== Music video ==
The song's accompanying music video premiered on September 23, 2015, on Fetty Wap's YouTube account. The video features scenes of Wap wearing a Chicago Bulls jersey, celebrating with his crew and Remy Boyz. Wap also appears performing onstage, as well as shots of Monty driving a BMW i8 through the streets, while singing along to the song. The video features interactions between Wap and an unnamed woman, both in person and over text messaging, as she experiences difficulties in her relationship.

== Performances ==
On 9 June 2015, Wap performed "My Way" alongside Monty on Jimmy Kimmel Live!, as well as "Trap Queen". The American band Phony Ppl were part of the performance as the backing band for Wap and Monty.

== Charts ==
=== Weekly charts ===
Chart (2015)	Peak position
Australia (ARIA)	94
France (SNEP)	102
Canada Hot 100 (Billboard)	32
UK Singles (Official Charts)	80
UK Hip Hop/R&B (Official Charts)	21
US Billboard Hot 100	7
US Hot R&B/Hip-Hop Songs (Billboard)	5
US Hot Rap Songs (Billboard)	3
US Rhythmic Airplay (Billboard)	1

=== Year-end charts ===
Chart (2015)	Position
US Billboard Hot 100	44
US Hot R&B/Hip-Hop Songs	13
US Rhythmic (Billboard)	14

== Certifications ==
Region	Certification	Certified units/sales
New Zealand (RMNZ)	Platinum	30,000^{‡}
United Kingdom (BPI)	Gold	400,000^{‡}
United States (RIAA)	4× Platinum	4,000,000^{‡}
^{‡} Sales+streaming figures based on certification alone.
