= Phony Ppl =

American music group

- Origin: Brooklyn, New York, U.S.
- Genres: Hip hop, R&B, neo soul progressive soul, art rock
- Years active: 2010–2025
- Members: Bari Bass; Matt "Maffyuu" Byas; Aja Grant; Elijah Rawk; Elbee Thrie
- Past members: Dyme-A-Duzin; Sheriff PJ; Temi O; Ian Bakerman
- Website: phonyppl.com

Phony Ppl was a musical group based in Brooklyn, New York. Originally founded in 2008 with five members, the most recent active members were Elbee Thrie (vocals), Elijah Rawk (lead guitar), Matt "Maffyuu" Byas (drums), Aja Grant (keyboard), and Bari Bass (bass guitar).

== Background ==
Members of Phony Ppl met in high school. Elbee (Robert Booker) and Aja first formed the group, with Dyme-A-Duzin (Donnovan Blocker), Bari Bass (Omar Grant), Elijah Rawk, Ian Bakerman, Temi O, Maffyuu, and Sheriff PJ joining later. In 2012, they released the album Phonyland.

In January 2015, they released the album Yesterday's Tomorrow. The album peaked at number 24 on the Billboard Heatseekers Album chart. It also peaked at number 15 on the Trending 140 chart and at number 7 on the Emerging Artists chart. They released the single "This Must Be Heaven" in November 2016. They made their first television appearance on June 9, 2015, on Jimmy Kimmel Live! performing "Trap Queen" with Fetty Wap.

In October 2018, they released the single "Something About Your Love" (stylized as "somethinG about your love."). Their album mō’zā-ik. was released on October 19, 2018. In January 2020, the group released "Fkn Around" with Megan Thee Stallion; their solo version was released in May. In November, they released the single "On My Shit" with Joey Badass.

On November 18, 2022, the group released a new album titled Euphonyus. The album featured artists and production from JoJo, Kaytranada, Leon Thomas, and Domo Genesis.

== Discography ==
=== Singles ===
Title	Year	Album
"Christmastime is here"	2023	Non-album single
"Fkn Around" (feat. Megan Thee Stallion)	2020	Non-album single
"Way Too Far."	2018	mō’zā-ik.
"Before You Get a Boyfriend."	2018	mō’zā-ik.

=== Albums ===
Title	Album details	Peak chart positions
Title	Album details	U.S. Heatseekers
WTF Is Phonyland?	Released: April 28, 2009; Label: Phony Ppl LLC; Format: Digital download	-
Phonyland	Released: January 17, 2012; Label: Phony Ppl LLC; Format: Digital download	-
nothinG special	Released: July 17, 2012; Label: Phony Ppl LLC; Format: Digital download	-
53,000.	Released: July 26, 2013; Label: Phony Ppl LLC; Format: Digital download	-
Yesterday's Tomorrow	Released: January 13, 2015; Label: Phony Ppl LLC; Format: Digital download	24
mō’zā-ik.	Released: October 19, 2018; Label: 300 Entertainment; Format: Digital download and physical	-
Euphonyus	Released: November 18, 2022; Label: 300 Entertainment; Format: Digital download	-
