= Willie Akins =

American jazz musician

Willie Akins (April 10, 1939 – October 2, 2015) was an American jazz musician. After eleven years in New York City, he was active from 1968 to 2015, mainly in the music scene of St. Louis.

== Life and career ==
Akins initially learned the recorder. He attended Douglass High School in his hometown of Webster Groves, Missouri. In 1957, he moved to New York City to work as a musician, but in 1961 produced his first record when he was in Chicago, playing in the band of Bobby Bryant; he also was involved in recording the works of Groove Holmes (Swedish Lullaby, 1984). In 1968, he returned to his hometown, where in the years that followed, he performed with his own quartet and presented two albums under his own name, Alima and the St. Louis Connection. He also taught at the Faculty of Jazz Studies at Webster University. In the field of jazz, Akins was involved 1961-2012 to nine recording sessions. He died on October 2, 2015, in St. Louis, Missouri.

== Discography ==
- Alima (1997)
- The Sound of St. Louis (2000)
- The St. Louis Connection (c. 2012), with Montez Coleman
