= Hulon =

American jazz musician

Hulon E. Crayton (c. 1956 – February 14, 2015) was a smooth jazz saxophonist hailing from Panama City, Florida, who started his jazz career as a member of noted jazz group On Call.

Hulon released his debut release, First Impressions, via Premier Musique Group in 2010. First Impressions was produced by noted smooth jazz artist Jeff Kashiwa and included eight original songs co-written by Kashiwa and Hulon, and also features a cover of the song "The Cisco Kid" by the band, War. The song "Sax on the Beach," served as the album's first single and reached No. 16 on the SmoothJazz.com Top 50 Indie Chart and was featured on the noted jazz website AllAboutJazz.com, in addition to receiving national and international airplay at terrestrial and online radio. The song "Dr. Goodfoot" served as the album's second single.

First Impressions was recorded at SGR Studios in Panama City, Florida with additional drum tracks recorded at Two Sticks Audio in Seattle, Washington, and Ahhsum Studios in West Covina, California. The album was mixed by Dave Darlington at Bass Hit Recording in New York City, New York.

In addition to his jazz career, Hulon was also a noted entrepreneur and philanthropist. Hulon ran The Arthritis and Infusion Center, a successful medical practice that specializes in the treatment of Rheumatological diseases and disorders as well as sports-related injuries. Hulon practiced rheumatology starting in 1986, after graduating from the University of Wisconsin–Madison. He was a diplomate of the American Board of Internal Medicine and of the American Board of Rheumatology. Hulon had a master's degree in hospital administration and served in the U.S. Army and the Army Reserve, obtaining the rank of captain. Hulon, and his wife, Dinah, created the Crayton Foundation, which assists minorities with funding their college education. He died aged 58 on February 14, 2015.

== Discography ==
- First Impressions (2010)
