= Monty (rapper) =

American rapper (born 1990)

- Also known as: Remy Boy Monty, Montana Buckz
- Born: Angel Luis Cosme Jr. August 23, 1990 (age 36); Paterson, New Jersey, U.S.
- Genre: Hip hop
- Occupations: Rapper; singer
- Years active: 2014-present
- Label: RGF
- Member of: Remy Boyz

Angel Luis Cosme Jr. (born August 23, 1990), better known by his stage name Monty (also known as Remy Boy Monty and Montana Buckz), is an American rapper from New Jersey. He is best known for his affiliation with fellow New Jerseyan Fetty Wap, with whom he founded the hip-hop group Remy Boyz. Cosme guest appeared on Fetty Wap's 2015 singles "679" and "My Way", which peaked at numbers four and seven on the Billboard Hot 100, respectively.

== Early life ==
Cosme was born on August 23, 1990, in Paterson, New Jersey.

== Career ==
Cosme gained popularity after his features on the Fetty Wap tracks "679" and "My Way", both of which peaked in the top 10 of the Billboard Hot 100. Buckz released his debut mixtape, Monty Zoo, on December 1, 2015.

== Discography ==
=== Mixtapes ===
Title	Mixtape details
Monty Zoo	Released: December 1, 2015; Label: RGF; Format: Digital download, streaming
Monty Zoo II	Released: June 23, 2017; Label: RGF; Format: Digital download, streaming

=== Singles ===
==== As lead artist ====
Title	Year	Album
"Khia" (featuring Fetty Wap and Tapia)	2015	Monty Zoo
"Not Poppin'" (featuring Fetty Wap)	2016	Monty Zoo
"Her"	2016	Monty Zoo II
"Right Back" (featuring Fetty Wap)	2016	Monty Zoo II

==== As featured artist ====
Title	Year	Peak chart positions						Certifications	Album
Title	Year	US	US R&B/HH	US Rap	AUS	CAN	UK	Certifications	Album
"679" (Fetty Wap featuring Monty and P-Dice as Remy Boyz)	2015	4	3	2	19	15	20	RIAA: 9× Platinum	Fetty Wap
"My Way" (Fetty Wap featuring Monty)	2015	7	5	3	94	32	80	RIAA: 4× Platinum	Fetty Wap
"Jugg" (Fetty Wap featuring Monty)	2015	86	32	24	—	—	—	RIAA: Platinum	Fetty Wap

=== Other charted and certified songs ===
Title	Year	Peak chart positions		Certifications	Album
Title	Year	US Bub.	US R&B/HH	Certifications	Album
"How We Do Things" (Fetty Wap featuring Monty)	2015	14	50		Fetty Wap
"Time" (Fetty Wap featuring Monty)	2015	—	—	RIAA: Gold	Fetty Wap
