= Feels Great =

2017 song by Cheat Codes

Single by Cheat Codes featuring Fetty Wap and CVBZ
- Released: October 13, 2017
- Genre: Indie dance
- Length: 3:13
- Label: 300; Parlophone; Warner Bros.
- Songwriter(s): Caleb Schultz; CVBZ; Ethan Roberts; Fetty Wap; Matthew Russell; Peter Hanna; Taylor Bird; Trevor Dahl
- Producer(s): Taylor Bird; Trevor Dahl

Cheat Codes singles chronology
"Sober" (2017)	"Feels Great" (2017)	"Put Me Back Together" (2017)

Fetty Wap singles chronology
"Text Ur Number" (2017)	"Feels Great" (2017)	"There She Go" (2017)

Music video
- "Feels Great" on YouTube

"Feels Great" is a song by American DJs Cheat Codes featuring American rapper Fetty Wap and producer CVBZ. It was released on October 13, 2017. The song reached no. 9 on Billboard’s Hot Dance/Electronic Songs chart, becoming the trio’s second Top 10 entry after "No Promises".

== Background ==
"Feels Great" is a track filled with nostalgia. Cheat Codes expressed in a statement: "Everybody loves to look back at the glory days, but being young is just a state of mind."

== Music video ==
The music video was released on December 13, 2017. The video features the artists stranded in the hills of California, throwing a party.

Cheat Codes tell XXL via email: "Youth is like diamonds in the sun and diamonds are forever, we had the best time with our friends making this video. It’s about feeling great and living better."

== Charts ==
=== Weekly charts ===
Weekly chart performance for "Feels Great"
Chart (2017–2018)	Peak position
Australia (ARIA)	39
Belgium (Ultratip Bubbling Under Flanders)	4
Belgium (Ultratip Bubbling Under Wallonia)	4
Latvia (DigiTop100)	74
New Zealand (Recorded Music NZ)	37
Sweden (Sverigetopplistan)	99
US Hot Dance/Electronic Songs (Billboard)	9
US Pop Airplay (Billboard)	31

=== Year-end charts ===
Year-end chart performance for "Feels Great"
Chart (2017)	Position
US Hot Dance/Electronic Songs (Billboard)	85
Chart (2018)	Position
US Hot Dance/Electronic Songs (Billboard)	26

== Certifications ==
Certifications for "Feels Great"
Region	Certification	Certified units/sales
Australia (ARIA)	Platinum	70,000^{‡}
New Zealand (RMNZ)	Platinum	30,000^{‡}
United States (RIAA)	Gold	500,000^{‡}
^{‡} Sales+streaming figures based on certification alone.
