= Brianna Lea Pruett =

American musician (1983–2015)

- Born: Brianna Lea Pruett; January 18, 1983; Sacramento, California
- Died: September 2, 2015 (aged 32) Sacramento, California
- Genre: Folk
- Instruments: Vocals, guitar
- Label: Canyon Records

Brianna Lea Pruett (January 18, 1983 – September 2, 2015) was an American singer-songwriter, musician, painter, poet, and filmmaker.

== Early life and family ==
Brianna Lea Pruett was born in Sacramento, California. Her family lived at a Northern California Shingle Springs ranch they had built with extended family members in the 1970s. She attended public schools in Sacramento after the family moved to the city in 1989, and through many moves following her parents' divorce and remarriages. Pruett was a second generation Californian. Both maternal grandparents descended from European Mormon settlers and her paternal ancestry is Native American. Both sides of her father's family include Cherokee, Choctaw, and Chickasaw relatives, as well as European immigrants. Pruett's interest in her family lineage is well documented through her creative output and helped connect her with the Native American record label Canyon Records.

== Music ==
Exposed to music, art, and film of all genres from a young age, Pruett was encouraged in artistic endeavors. Her parents' vinyl collection—encompassing everything from classical and choir music to folk and rock legends like Leonard Cohen, Janis Joplin, and Jimi Hendrix—served as Pruett's first music history education. Other noted influences included Tom Waits, Roberta Flack, and Doc Watson. When she was a teenager, she often sang in clubs, cafes, on street corners, and art galleries in Northern California, performing a cappella, with acoustic guitar, and occasionally with a band.

Pruett has self-released two albums, 2003's Natural Fact and 2004's Winter Apple, both of which were recorded in Portland, Oregon. She later re-released them through Tiger Friends Collective, the same company that released 2011's The Stars, The Moon, The Owl, The Cougar, and You and 2012's Keeping You in Mind.

Pruett's 2013 debut on Canyon Records, Gypsy Bells, gained generally favorable reviews and media attention. Her style is often associated with folk music falling in a singer-songwriter category. However, Pruett lists diverse musical influences like Emmylou Harris, Carole King, Iron & Wine, Pavement, Woody Guthrie, and Charles Mingus and has been compared to a mix of "Angel Olson + Damien Jurado" and Cat Power.

== Discography ==
- Dreamland (unreleased)
- Natural Fact (2003 self-released, 2009 re-released Tiger Friends Collective)
- Winter Apple (2004 self-released, 2009 re-released Tiger Friends Collective)
- The Stars, The Moon, The Owl, The Cougar, and You (2011)
- Keeping You in Mind (2012)
- Gypsy Bells (2013)

== Painting ==
Pruett began painting as a career at age 16 while living with a professional artist. Until her death, she worked primarily in oil painting. Her work has been exhibited in galleries throughout New York and California and can be viewed on her website. Pruett was a member of the California Art Club.

== Poetry ==
Pruett's poetry has appeared in publications including Rabbit and Rose and Turtle Island To Abya Yala: A Love Anthology of Art and Poetry by Native American and Latina Women. Selections can also be read in the upcoming edition of Blue Moon Literary & Art Review.

== Film ==
Pruett began filming with a handheld DV camera, creating short films that cost nothing to produce, in 2005. Our Love And Voices, a short from her film series Roses For Maya Deren premiered at the 2012 American Indian Film Festival. A DVD release of Roses For Maya Deren was recently funded on Indiegogo, which included 18 of the more than 30 short films she shot between 2005 and 2012. The final DVD was released in early 2015 and in May 2015, the 18 shorts were made available on Vimeo On Demand. Those titles include:

Title	Length	Location
A Blessing: Pregnant	4:40	Placerville, CA
Adpurge	4:32	San Francisco, CA
Coffee For One	4:15	Puerto Vallarta, Mexico
Conversation Through Time	4:20	Placerville, CA
Culturing	4:01	Humboldt, CA
El Milagro	8:31	Sacramento, CA
I Am Free	1:33	Placerville, CA
I Feel the Earth, This is Love	2:58	Placerville, CA
Man Achieves Wholeness	12:56	Sacramento, CA
Man's Song	8:25	Portland, OR
Mexican Disco	4:15	Puerto Vallarta, Mexico
New York in a Hurricane	3:14	New York, NY
Our Love And Voices	4:24	Bozeman, Yellowstone, MT
She Will Be	3:44	Sacramento, CA
The Most Important Thing II	5:27	Pollock Pines, CA
Things Men Have Said About Me That I Remember	5:05	Placerville, CA
Toxic Babes	5:18	Sacramento, CA
You	5:09	Sacramento, CA

Pruett was a member of the Sundance Institute.

== Death ==
Pruett died by suicide on September 2, 2015. The manner of death was not made public. She was 32, and had been depressed off and on for most of her adult life.
