= Wake Up (Fetty Wap song) =

Single by Fetty Wap
- Released: April 20, 2016
- Recorded: 2016
- Genre: Trap
- Length: 3:44
- Label: RGF; 300
- Songwriter: Willie Maxwell II
- Producer: Frenzy

Fetty Wap singles chronology
"Jimmy Choo" (2016)	"Wake Up" (2016)	"All in My Head (Flex)" (2016)

"Wake Up" is a song by American hip-hop recording artist Fetty Wap. The song was released on April 20, 2016 by RGF Productions and 300 Entertainment. The track was produced by Frenzy.

"Wake Up" peaked at number 50 on the Billboard Hot 100, and received platinum certification by the Recording Industry Association of America (RIAA) in June 2017.

== Music video ==
The song's accompanying music video premiered on May 27, 2016 on Fetty Wap's YouTube account. The video was filmed at Eastside High School, which Fetty Wap attended, in his hometown of Paterson, New Jersey.

== Commercial performance ==
"Wake Up" debuted at number 84 on Billboard Hot 100 for the chart dated May 14, 2016. It later reached the top 50 on Billboard Hot 100 dated July 23, 2016.

== Charts and certifications ==
=== Weekly charts ===
Chart (2016)	Peak position
US Billboard Hot 100	50
US Hot R&B/Hip-Hop Songs (Billboard)	15
US Rhythmic Airplay (Billboard)	27

=== Year-end charts ===
Chart (2016)	Position
US Hot R&B/Hip-Hop Songs (Billboard)	59

=== Certifications ===
Region	Certification	Certified units/sales
United States (RIAA)	Platinum	1,000,000^{‡}
^{‡} Sales+streaming figures based on certification alone.
