= Buddy Boudreaux =

- Buddy Boudreaux in 1985

Background information
- Born: John Landry Boudreaux; December 27, 1917; Donaldsonville, Louisiana, United States
- Died: June 13, 2015 (aged 97) Baton Rouge, Louisiana, U.S.
- Genres: Big band Jazz
- Instruments: Saxophone; Clarinet

John Landry “Buddy” Boudreaux (December 27, 1917 – June 13, 2015) was an American big band and jazz musician. He played saxophone and clarinet. Starting in 1934, he directed and played in a number of bands that toured the southern United States and drew nationally known performers to Baton Rouge, Louisiana. The State-Times newspaper called him "the city’s sound of big band". His bands backed such artists as Andy Williams, Bernadette Peters, Doc Severinsen, Dionne Warwick, Gladys Knight & the Pips, Burt Bacharach, Johnny Mathis, The Four Tops, Bob Hope, George Burns and Joan Rivers. He opened shows for Tony Bennett, Tony Orlando, Louise Mandrell, The Beach Boys and Bill Cosby. He was co-author—with his barber, Michael T. Abadie—of “My Baton Rouge,” which in 1998 was declared the city's official song.

== Early life ==
Boudreaux was born in Donaldsonville, Louisiana, and moved to Baton Rouge with his family six months later. His father, Edward Lawrence Boudreaux (1893-1970), was a machinist supervisor at the Standard Oil refinery in Baton Rouge. His mother, Rena Marie Landry Boudreaux (1889-1954), who played piano, encouraged her son's interest in music, staying up late at night with the boy listening to live broadcasts of big band on the radio in the 1920s.

A music teacher heard Boudreaux blowing a cousin's saxophone and talked him into lessons. With money earned caddying for a neighbor who was the golf professional at a Baton Rouge country club, Boudreaux, at age 12, bought a saxophone and, for $10, a dozen music lessons, the only formal training he ever had.

== Education ==
Boudreaux was a 1936 graduate of Baton Rouge High School, where he played in the band. To please his father, he enrolled as a chemical engineering major at Louisiana State University, but music remained his first interest. He played in the LSU Tiger Marching Band. He dropped out of LSU after one semester to pursue a music career. More than a decade later, after serving in World War II, he finished his studies on the G.I. Bill, earning a bachelor's degree in business administration at the University of California, Berkeley, in 1950.

== Music career ==
In 1929, Boudreaux joined a 12-piece neighborhood children's orchestra that played for Saturday kiddie shows at the Paramount Theater. He played his first professional engagement in 1932, at age 14, and two years later joined the Clovis Hendry Orchestra. He began his career as a band leader in 1939 by visiting Baton Rouge clubs and claiming to have a band that was booked solid out of town for two months. Impressed, “the club owners hired him,” the State-Times newspaper wrote later. “Then he went out and formed a band.” In addition to his own, Boudreaux performed with the Bob Crosby Orchestra, and the Jimmy Dorsey Orchestra under the direction of Lee Castle. He toured the South with the Tommy Dorsey Orchestra under the direction of Warren Covington.

Those groups specialized in the swing music popular in the United States in the 1920s, ‘30s and ‘40s, when big bands criss-crossed the country to perform. Those nationwide tours became unprofitable in later decades as younger audiences turned to rock music. “However, the public had not lost its taste for swing or an evening of dancing,” Jazz Society reported, “and this spawned the growth of regional big bands, like Boudreaux’s Buddy Lee Orchestra, groups of top-notch musicians who only play locally.”

The 16-piece Buddy Lee Orchestra was co-founded in 1973 by Boudreaux and Lee Fortier, a trumpet-playing friend from their days in the youth orchestra. It was the best known of Boudreaux's bands. In 1986, the Buddy Lee Orchestra alternated sets with Buddy Rich’s big band during a Baton Rouge performance billed as the Buddy Buddy Concert.

Boudreaux performed from his early teens well into his 90s, playing for Mardi Gras balls, dances, wedding receptions, riverboat parties, restaurant brunch crowds, and debutante balls. Depending on the occasion, he assembled a seven-piece Buddy Boudreaux Dance Band (with vocalist Jerie Ford), a six-piece Buddy Boudreaux Jazz Ensemble, or a four-piece XL-Acoustic Jazz Combo. “Over half a century,” the State-Times wrote in 1991, “he’s galvanized musicians who have entertained the city and drawn to it stars who would not have entertained here had there not been top quality musicians to back them up.”

== Military service ==
Boudreaux was a World War II veteran who served in the Army Air Corps from February 1943 to September 1945 in Morocco, Algeria, Tunisia and Italy. He was attached to the 20th Replacement Battalion and reached the rank of sergeant major. He took his music with him, performing in a seven-piece army band, the Dukes of Rhythm, for United Service Organization (USO) shows, officer dances and public dances in French Morocco.

== Other ventures ==
Boudreaux's day job until 1980 was at the Standard Oil (now ExxonMobil) refinery and chemical plant complex in Baton Rouge. He started as an office boy in 1937 and retired as senior supervisor of the Financial Analysis and Reporting Operations Analysis sections.

Between 1950 and 1990, he served as leader and representative of Local 538 of the American Federation of Musicians.

In 1998, he helped form the Louisiana Octogenarian Golf Team, which entered tournaments across the South and donated its winnings to the sponsoring charities. In his 80s, he won 32 Senior Olympics golf medals in Louisiana. During his sons’ growing years, he served as a leader of their Cub Scout and Boy Scout packs.

== Personal life and death ==
Boudreaux married Ruth Bowman Suthon (1925-2019), an LSU graduate and Standard Oil co-worker, in 1947. They had four sons—Richard L. Boudreaux (1948) a journalist; John L. Boudreaux Jr. (1950-2018), a retired FedEx pilot; Ronald C. Boudreaux (1956-2019), a professional drummer; and Jeffrey L. Boudreaux (1959), a professional drummer—three grandchildren and two great-grandchildren.

Boudreaux died in Baton Rouge on June 13, 2015, aged 97.

== Broadcasts and films ==
Boudreaux performed on the Derby Show, a daily broadcast on the Baton Rouge radio station WJBO to promote a three-month-long dance marathon in 1940. Boudreaux's music appeared in the movies The Toy (1982), Blaze (1989), and the French film Louisiana (1984).

== Discography ==
- The Buddy Boudreaux Quartet (1983)
- The Buddy Boudreaux Jazz Ensemble (1984)
- My Baton Rouge (1985)
- Buddy Lee Orchestra (1985)
- XL-Acoustic Jazz Combo (1985)
- The Buddy Boudreaux Dance Band (1985)
