= Jimmy Choo (song) =

Single by Fetty Wap
- Released: February 5, 2016
- Genre: Hip-hop
- Length: 2:56
- Label: RGF; 300
- Songwriters: Willie Maxwell; John Ashton; Tim Butler; Richard Butler; Vince Ely
- Producer: K.E. on the Track

Fetty Wap singles chronology
"Promise" (2015)	"Jimmy Choo" (2016)	"Wake Up" (2016)

"Jimmy Choo" is a song by American rapper Fetty Wap. It was released on February 5, 2016 by 300 Entertainment, and was produced by K.E. on the Track. The song samples the intro of The Psychedelic Furs' 1982 song "Love My Way".

== Release ==
Fetty Wap first released the track on his SoundCloud on November 5, 2015. The song rose to popularity through a vine that went viral, featuring two girls dancing to the song. This led to the song's official release on February 5, 2016, via digital distribution as a single. Lyrically, he serenades a lady wearing the designer heels. Noted by Billboard, the song contains an "undulating" hook ("Jimmy Choo's on her feet when she be walkin'"), delivered in his "half-mumbled" vocal style against a smooth, clubby backdrop.

== Commercial performance ==
"Jimmy Choo" debuted at number 69 on Billboard Hot 100 for the chart dated February 21, 2016. Its chart debut was supported by first-week sales of 35,045 copies. As of March 2016, the single sold over 113,000 copies in the US. "Jimmy Choo" marked the fifth consecutive single to enter the top 10 on the Hot Rap Songs chart by Fetty Wap.

== Charts ==
=== Weekly charts ===
Chart (2016)	Peak position
US Billboard Hot 100	65
US Hot R&B/Hip-Hop Songs (Billboard)	19
