= 679 (song) =

Single by Fetty Wap featuring Remy Boyz

from the album Fetty Wap and Up Next
- Released: June 29, 2015
- Recorded: 2014–2015
- Genre: Hip-hop; trap
- Length: 3:16 (single version with Remy Boyz); 3:07 (album version with Monty); 2:15 (promotional version)
- Label: RGF; 300
- Songwriters: Willie Maxwell; Justin Pope; Angel Luis Cosme Jr.
- Producer: Brian "Peoples" Garcia

Fetty Wap singles chronology
"Save Dat Money" (2015)	"679" (2015)	"My Way" (2015)

"679" is the second single by American rapper and singer Fetty Wap from his self-titled debut album. The song features rap duo Remy Boyz, which consists of rappers Monty and P-Dice. "679" peaked at No. 4 on the US Billboard Hot 100, becoming his second highest-charting single after "Trap Queen". The album version of the song omits P-Dice's verse, featuring only Monty. The Remy Boyz version is included on his 2014 mixtape Up Next.

Lyrically, the song finds all 3 performers admiring an attractive woman in a nightclub environment. Its title is a reference to Fetty Wap's birth date of June 7, 1991.

== Background and release ==
"679" was released on June 29, 2015. The name ''679" comes from Wap's birthday, which is June 7, 1991 (6/7/1991). Wap stated that he considers "679" to be his best song so far. Wap and Monty performed the song on The Tonight Show Starring Jimmy Fallon in September 2015.

Genius pointed out the similarity between "679" and the Chainsmokers' "Closer" in September 2016, claiming that the songs' choruses are nearly identical, with the only major difference being that Fetty's is in B minor and the Chainsmokers' is in A-flat major. Genius even cut together a video of the choruses playing over each other.

== Composition ==
"679" is a hip hop song. It was written by Fetty Wap and Remy Boyz. The song was produced by Brian "Peoples" Garcia.

== Music video ==
The video for "679" was released to the WorldStarHipHop official YouTube channel in May 2015. It was later uploaded to Fetty Wap's YouTube channel in July 2015 and has over 503 million combined views as of September 2025.

== Commercial performance ==
"679" was the highest-ranking debut on the Billboard Hot 100 for the chart dated July 18, 2015, entering the chart at number 34. Its chart debut was fueled by first-week digital download sales of 86,000 copies as well as 3.4 million domestic streams. The following week, it jumped to number 19, earning the biggest gain in streams on the chart. "679" became Wap's third top 10 hit in the United States during the year of 2015, when it reached number eight on the chart dated September 5, 2015, and peaked at number four. As of February 2016, "679" has sold 1,830,064 copies domestically.

== Charts ==
=== Weekly charts ===
Chart (2015–2016)	Peak position
Australia (ARIA)	19
Australia Urban (ARIA)	4
Belgium (Ultratip Bubbling Under Flanders)	70
Canada Hot 100 (Billboard)	15
Czech Republic Singles Digital (ČNS IFPI)	50
France (SNEP)	122
Ireland (IRMA)	41
Netherlands (Single Top 100)	67
New Zealand (Recorded Music NZ)	13
Sweden (Sverigetopplistan)	52
Switzerland (Schweizer Hitparade)	65
UK Singles (Official Charts)	20
UK Hip Hop/R&B (Official Charts)	11
US Billboard Hot 100	4
US Hot R&B/Hip-Hop Songs (Billboard)	3
US Hot Rap Songs (Billboard)	2
US Dance Airplay (Billboard)	33
US Pop Airplay (Billboard)	19
US Rhythmic Airplay (Billboard)	2

Chart (2026)	Peak position
Global 200 (Billboard)	193
Philippines (Philippines Hot 100)	83

=== Year-end charts ===
Chart (2015)	Position
Australia Urban (ARIA)	27
Canada (Canadian Hot 100)	66
UK Singles (Official Charts Company)	82
US Billboard Hot 100	21
US Hot R&B/Hip-Hop Songs	7
US Rhythmic (Billboard)	20

Chart (2016)	Position
Australia Urban (ARIA)	27
Canada (Canadian Hot 100)	59
US Billboard Hot 100	54
US Hot R&B/Hip-Hop Songs (Billboard)	29

== Certifications ==
Region	Certification	Certified units/sales
Australia (ARIA)	Gold	35,000^{‡}
Denmark (IFPI Danmark)	Platinum	90,000^{‡}
Germany (BVMI)	Gold	200,000^{‡}
Italy (FIMI)	Gold	25,000^{‡}
New Zealand (RMNZ)	5× Platinum	150,000^{‡}
Poland (ZPAV)	Gold	25,000^{‡}
Sweden (GLF)	Platinum	40,000^{‡}
United Kingdom (BPI)	2× Platinum	1,200,000^{‡}
United States (RIAA)	9× Platinum	9,000,000^{‡}
^{‡} Sales+streaming figures based on certification alone.
