= Fetty Wap (album) =

Studio album by Fetty Wap
- Released: September 25, 2015
- Recorded: 2013–2015
- Genre: Hip-hop
- Length: 64:21 (standard edition); 76:58 (deluxe edition)
- Labels: RGF; 300
- Producers: Frank Robinson (exec.); Danny "Su" Griffin (exec.); Bernard "2GZ" Smith (exec.); Shy Boogs; Peoples; Frenzy; Lil Brandon; JayFrance; NickEBeats; Tony Fadd; Lacemode

Fetty Wap chronology
Zoo Style (2015)	Fetty Wap (2015)	Coke Zoo (2015)

Singles from Fetty Wap
- 1. "Trap Queen" Released: April 22, 2014; 2. "679" Released: June 29, 2015; 3. "My Way" Released: July 17, 2015; 4. "Again" Released: August 13, 2015

Fetty Wap is the eponymous debut studio album by American rapper Fetty Wap. It was released on September 25, 2015, by RGF Productions and 300 Entertainment. Both Monty and M80, who were members of the Remy Boyz, contributed as featured guest artists on the album.

The album was supported by four US Billboard Hot 100 top 40 singles: "Trap Queen", "679" featuring Remy Boyz, "My Way" featuring Monty, and "Again". The album's lead single, "Trap Queen" received two Grammy Award nominations.

== Background ==
In November 2014, Fetty Wap announced that he had signed a deal with 300 Entertainment, which resulted from the re-release of his popular debut single "Trap Queen", which charted at number 2 on the US Billboard Hot 100.

== Singles ==
Fetty Wap's commercial debut single, called "Trap Queen" was released through iTunes on April 22, 2014. The song was produced by Tony Fadd. "Trap Queen" became Fetty Wap's first entry on the US Billboard Hot 100, becoming a top 10 single, peaking at number 2. It also peaked within the top 10 of various countries, including Belgium, Denmark and the United Kingdom. To date, the song is certified diamond by the Recording Industry Association of America (RIAA).

The album's second single, called "679" was released on June 29, 2015. The song features guest verses from the Remy Boyz, which is an East Coast hip hop group that Wap created, with production by Peoples. The song became Wap's third top 10 single in the United States, reaching at number 4. The album version of the song omits P-Dice's verse, only featuring Monty. To date, the song was certified three-time platinum by the Recording Industry Association of America (RIAA).

The album's third single, called "My Way" premiered on Fetty Wap's SoundCloud on July 17, 2015. The song features a guest verse from a local American rapper Monty, with the production by NickEBeats. The song was later remixed, with a guest verse from Canadian rapper Drake. The song peaked at number 7 on the US Billboard Hot 100, after jumping from 87 to the top 10. To date, the song was certified platinum by the Recording Industry Association of America (RIAA).

Wap released the album's fourth and final single, called "Again" on August 13, 2015, after the song premiered previously via SoundCloud. Peoples also produced this track as well, alongside the additional production by Shy Boogs. The song reached at number 33 on the US Billboard Hot 100. To date, the song was certified gold by the Recording Industry Association of America (RIAA).

=== Promotional singles ===
"RGF Island" and "Jugg" featuring Monty, were both made available for purchase via the album on September 22, 2015, as promotional singles. To date, the track "RGF Island" was certified gold by the Recording Industry Association of America (RIAA). These former songs have previously appeared on his mixtape Zoo Style.

== Critical reception ==
Professional ratings
Aggregate scores
Source	Rating
Metacritic	68/100
Review scores
Source	Rating
AllMusic	3.5/5 stars
Complex	3.5/5 stars
The Guardian	4/5 stars
HipHopDX	2.5/5 stars
Pitchfork Media	7.6/10
Rolling Stone	3/5 stars
Spin	7/10

Fetty Wap was met with generally favorable reviews upon release. At Metacritic, which assigns a normalized rating out of 100 to reviews from music critics, the album has received an average score of 68, indicating "generally favorable reviews", based on 11 reviews. The Guardian's Paul MacInnes wrote: "there is enough modern romance and melodic sense (and quirkiness, such as the mumbled hook of Time) to make a decent album-within-an-album, and to mark Fetty Wap as a winning new talent in hip-hop." Meaghan Garvey in Pitchfork Media thought: "as a whole, Fetty Wap adopts the same self-assured stance: Fetty's formula definitely ain't broke, and he doesn't seem in a hurry to fix it." For Colin Joyce of Spin, Wap "shows the consistency to scatter those songs throughout Fetty Wap's 17 tracks and to mostly stick to the limited formula that made them hit as hard as they did on the rest of the record."

In a mixed review, XXL staff wrote: "Fetty’s attempt at putting together a full, formal project takes away from the overall prestige of his hits that have been so cherished over the past 12 months. This isn’t to say that the next album will won’t be able to more effectively balance hits and album cuts. But this one feels like the first attempt that it is." Giving the album three-out-of-five stars, Rolling Stone editor Jon Dolan opined: "with a set list running up to 20 songs, it borders on Fetty overkill, but there are plenty of fine moments you haven't heard yet."

=== Year-end lists ===
The album was featured on NME's "Albums of the Year 2015" list at number 30. It also appeared on Complex "Best Albums of 2015" list at number 40, with the editors commenting "Fetty is the hero we didn’t know we needed, a true underdog with vocal contortion and insane melodies being his super powers."

== Commercial performance ==
The album debuted at number one on the US Billboard 200, with 129,000 album-equivalent units (75,000 in pure album sales) in its first week. In its second week, the album fell to number 4 on the Billboard 200, with 64,000 album-equivalent units (22,000 copies). As of March 2016, the album has sold 300,000 copies in the United States. In March 2016, the album was certified platinum by the Recording Industry Association of America (RIAA) for combined sales and album-equivalent units of over a million units.

In 2016, Fetty Wap was ranked as the 15th most popular album of the year on the Billboard 200.

== Track listing ==
Fetty Wap – CD - LP– digital download – streaming
No.	Title	Writer(s)	Producer(s)	Length
1.	"Trap Queen"	Willie Maxwell II; Tony Fadd	Fadd	3:42
2.	"How We Do Things" (featuring Monty)	Maxwell II; Angel Cosme, Jr.; Milan Modi	Yung Lan	3:31
3.	"679" (featuring Monty)	Maxwell II; Cosme, Jr.; Brian Garcia	Peoples	3:07
4.	"Jugg" (featuring Monty)	Maxwell II; Cosme, Jr.	Salik Singletary	3:20
5.	"Trap Luv"	Maxwell II; Hunter Pinkney	Treadway	3:24
6.	"I Wonder"	Maxwell II; Garcia	Peoples	2:57
7.	"Again"	Maxwell II; Garcia; Eddie Timmons	Peoples; Shy Boogs	5:12
8.	"My Way" (featuring Monty)	Maxwell II; Cosme, Jr.	Lil Brandon; NickEBeats; JayFrance^{[a]}	3:33
9.	"Time" (featuring Monty)	Maxwell II; Cosme, Jr.; Garcia; Timmons	Peoples; Shy Boogs	4:38
10.	"Boomin"	Maxwell II; Karriem Hicks	Frenzy	3:15
11.	"RGF Island"	Maxwell II; Modi	Yung Lan	2:53
12.	"D.A.M."	Maxwell II; Garcia	Peoples	3:45
13.	"No Days Off" (featuring Monty)	Maxwell II; Ricki G; Pascal Blais-Scherer; Nate Rhoads	Pascal Blais-Scherer; Rhoads	5:04
14.	"I'm Straight"	Maxwell II; Modi	Yung Lan	2:50
15.	"Couple Bands"	Maxwell II; Olasoji Adenuga	Adenuga	3:28
16.	"Rock My Chain" (featuring M80)	Maxwell II; Garcia; Nadir Wilkes	Peoples	4:07
17.	"Rewind" (featuring Monty)	Maxwell II; Cosme, Jr.; Rhoads; Timmons	Rhoads, Rivera	5:36
Total length:				64:21

Fetty Wap – Deluxe edition (bonus tracks)
No.	Title	Writer(s)	Producer(s)	Length
18.	"Let It Bang"	Maxwell II	Lacemode	3:44
19.	"For My Team" (featuring Monty)	Maxwell II; Cosme, Jr.	L.U.C. Productions	3:42
20.	"Whateva" (featuring Monty)	Maxwell II; Cosme, Jr.	Destyn Hill, AztroQuay & Richy Rolled	5:11
Total length:				76:58

Notes

- ^{^[a]} signifies a co-producer.
- The album version of the song "679" omits P-Dice's verse, only featuring Monty, with another verse by Fetty Wap.
- The album version of the song "How We Do Things" omits P-Dice's verse, only featuring Monty.

== Personnel ==
Credits for Fetty Wap adapted from AllMusic.

- Olasoji Adenuga – producer
- Nick E Beats – producer
- Frenzy Beatz – producer
- Tony Fadd – producer
- Fetty Wap – primary artist
- Pascal Blais-Scherer – producer
- Brian "Peoples" Garcia – engineer, mixing, producer
- Danny "Su" Griffin – executive producer
- Jarrod Lacy – mastering
- Jay France – producer
- M80 – featured artist
- Monty – featured artist
- Davon Phillips – producer
- Nate Rhoads – producer
- Frank Robinson – executive producer
- Salik Singletary – producer
- Bernard "2GZ" Smith – executive producer
- Edward Timmons – assistant engineer, guitar, producer
- Treadway – producer
- Virgilio Tzaj – art direction
- Diwang Valdez – photography
- Yung Lan – producer

== Charts ==
=== Weekly charts ===
Chart (2015–2026)	Peak position
Australian Albums (ARIA)	13
Belgian Albums (Ultratop Flanders)	153
Canadian Albums (Billboard)	13
Danish Albums (Hitlisten)	12
Dutch Albums (Album Top 100)	73
French Albums (SNEP)	57
Irish Albums (IRMA)	56
New Zealand Albums (RMNZ)	30
Norwegian Albums (VG-lista)	32
Swedish Albums (Sverigetopplistan)	13
Swiss Albums (Schweizer Hitparade)	81
UK Albums (Official Charts)	15
UK R&B Albums (Official Charts)	2
US Billboard 200	1
US Top R&B/Hip-Hop Albums (Billboard)	1

=== Year-end charts ===
Chart (2015)	Position
US Billboard 200	60
US Top R&B/Hip-Hop Albums (Billboard)	25
US Top Rap Albums (Billboard)	17
Chart (2016)	Position
Canadian Albums (Billboard)	32
US Billboard 200	15
US Top R&B/Hip-Hop Albums (Billboard)	12
Chart (2017)	Position
US Billboard 200	182
Chart (2025)	Position
US Top R&B/Hip-Hop Albums (Billboard)	77

=== Decade-end charts ===
Chart (2010–2019)	Position
US Billboard 200	110

== Certifications ==
Region	Certification	Certified units/sales
Canada (Music Canada)	Platinum	80,000^{‡}
Denmark (IFPI Danmark)	Platinum	20,000^{‡}
New Zealand (RMNZ)	3× Platinum	45,000^{‡}
Sweden (GLF)	Gold	20,000^{‡}
United Kingdom (BPI)	Gold	100,000^{‡}
United States (RIAA)	3× Platinum	3,000,000^{‡}
^{‡} Sales+streaming figures based on certification alone.
