= Fetty Wap =

American rapper (born 1991)

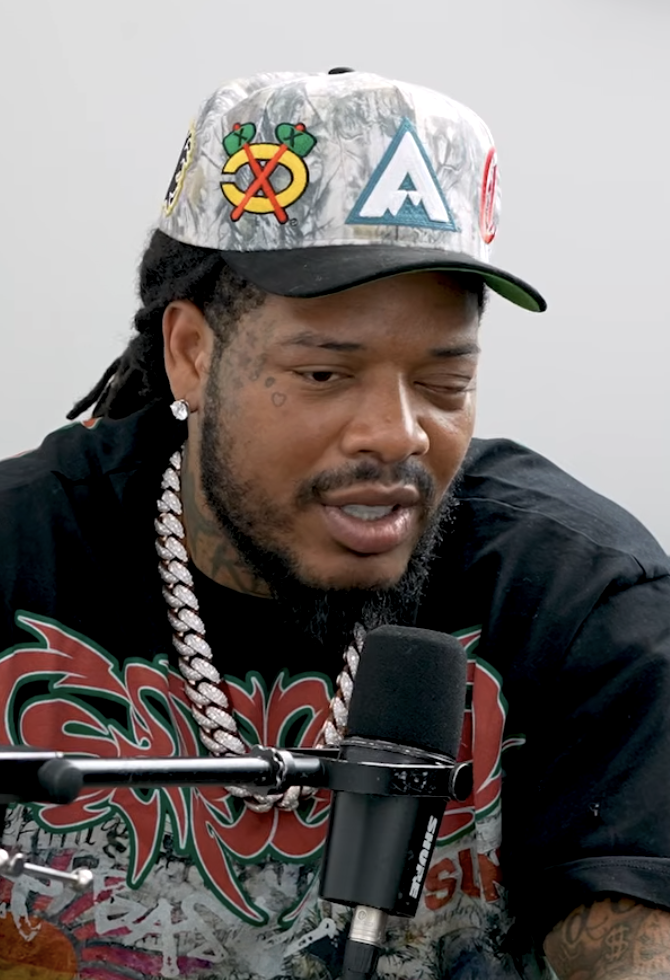
- Fetty Wap in 2026

Background information
- Also known as: Harlem Fetty; FettyWap1738
- Born: Willie Junior Maxwell II; June 7, 1991 (age 35); Paterson, New Jersey, U.S.
- Genres: Hip hop; trap; pop rap; R&B
- Occupations: Rapper; singer; songwriter
- Works: Fetty Wap discography
- Years active: 2013–present
- Labels: RGF; 300; Atlantic
- Formerly of: Remy Boyz
- Spouse: Leandra Gonzalez (m. 2019; div. 2020)
- Children: 6
- Criminal information
- Status: Released
- Convictions: Trafficking of 100 kilograms (220 pounds) of cocaine, heroin, fentanyl, and crack cocaine across Long Island and New Jersey (sentenced on May 24, 2023)
- Criminal charge: Conspiracy to distribute and possess controlled substances (x1)
- Penalty: 6 years (72 months)

Details
- States: New Jersey, New York
- Date apprehended: October 6, 2022
- Website: fettywap.com

Willie Junior Maxwell II (born June 7, 1991), better known by his stage name Fetty Wap (/wɑːp/), is an American rapper, singer, and songwriter. He quickly rose to mainstream prominence after his 2014 song "Trap Queen" peaked at number two on the Billboard Hot 100 and led him to sign with 300 Entertainment, an imprint of Atlantic Records. Two of his 2015 singles, "679" (featuring Remy Boyz) and "My Way" (remixed featuring Drake), peaked within the top ten of the chart; all three—as well as the top 40 single "Again"—preceded his eponymous debut studio album (2015), which peaked atop the Billboard 200. During this time, he became distinctive for his melodic blending of singing and rapping, lighthearted lyrics, "bouncy" production, and exclamation of various catchphrases such as "1738!"

In 2016, he saw moderate success with his follow-up singles "Jimmy Choo" and "Wake Up", and guest appeared on Fifth Harmony's single "All In My Head (Flex)." His 2018 single, "Keke" (with 6ix9ine and A Boogie wit da Hoodie) marked a brief resurgence and moderately entered the Billboard Hot 100. "Again" re-entered the Hot 100 in 2025 following a period of popularity on social media.

Fetty Wap has received two Grammy Award nominations throughout his career, and won the 2016 awards for "Best New Artist" and "Top New Artist" by the iHeartRadio Music Awards and Billboard Music Awards, respectively. In 2022, he was sentenced to six years in prison for trafficking illegal substances, and was released in 2026.

== Early life ==
Maxwell was born and raised in Paterson, New Jersey. Born with glaucoma in both eyes, Maxwell revealed in an interview in 2015 that doctors were unable to save his left eye and instead fitted him with an ocular prosthesis. He attended Eastside High School before dropping out.

== Career ==
=== 2013–2015: Beginnings and debut album ===
Fetty Wap developed an interest in making music in 2013. Initially starting off as a rapper, he later decided to start singing as well because he "wanted to do something different". He was nicknamed "Fetty," which is slang for "money"; "Wap" was added to the end of the name to perform in tribute to Gucci Mane's alias, Guwop.

Fetty Wap's commercial debut single, titled "Trap Queen", was released in early 2014. This song appeared in his 2014 mixtape Up Next released in July 2014. He recorded the song in February 2014. However, it did not gain major recognition until mid-November 2014, and since then it has become a platinum record and has over 200 million plays on SoundCloud. In November 2014, Fetty Wap represented by Attorney Navarro W. Gray secured a recording contract with 300 Entertainment, the imprint was founded by Lyor Cohen, Kevin Liles, Roger Gold and Todd Moscowitz, with distribution through Atlantic Records. The song "Trap Queen" is about a woman dealing and cooking crack cocaine. His second mixtape, Fetty Wap: The Mixtape was originally set for release in February 2015, but was delayed because he continued to create new songs. In June 2015, Fetty Wap was included in XXL's 2015 Freshman Class.

On June 29, 2015, Fetty Wap released his second single "679", originally from his Up Next mixtape. The song's accompanying music video premiered on YouTube in May, before being commercially released. "679" had an original version with Monty only and an added verse by Fetty Wap. The Remy Boyz version was removed from the album. His next single, "My Way", became his second top 10 entry on the Billboard Hot 100. Later, Drake remixed "My Way" and created the version that was then played on radio. Afterwards, "679" reached the Hot 100 top 10 peaking at number four.

During the week of July 26 to August 1, 2015, the rapper matched Billboard marks by hip-hop prominent artists Eminem and Lil Wayne. He became the first male rapper with three songs occupying the top 20 spots on the Billboard Hot 100 chart since Eminem did so in 2013. He also became the first male rapper in four years to have concurrent singles reach the top 10 of the same chart since Lil Wayne did so in 2011. With his fourth single "Again", Fetty Wap became the first act in the Hot Rap Songs chart's 26-year history to chart his first four entries in the top 10 simultaneously.

Fetty Wap's debut studio album Fetty Wap was released on September 25, 2015. The album debuted at number one on the US Billboard 200, with 129,000 equivalent album units (75,484 in pure album sales). Fetty Wap subsequently released two mixtapes for streaming only: Coke Zoo in collaboration with French Montana and ZOO 16: The Mixtape with Zoo Gang. Fetty Wap received two nominations at the 58th Grammy Awards.

=== 2016–2020: EPs, mixtapes and other releases ===
On February 5, 2016, Fetty Wap released a new single titled "Jimmy Choo". On April 26, 2016, it was announced that Fetty Wap would have his own mobile racing game available on phone, tablet, and Apple TV starting on May 3. The game is offshoot of mobile game Nitro Nation Stories. A street racing game, it has multi-player, car customization, and different storylines to choose. It has partnered with automotive brands like BMW, Nissan, and Cadillac. The Fetty Wap version will include Fetty Wap and Monty into the storyline.

Fetty Wap was featured on the Fifth Harmony single "All in My Head (Flex)". He released the single "Wake Up" in April 2016. The official music video for the song was filmed at his alma mater, Eastside High School. His single "Make You Feel Good" was released in August 2016.

Fetty Wap in 2019

On November 21, 2016, he released a 19 track mixtape titled Zoovier.

His song "Like a Star" features Nicki Minaj and was released in December 2016.

On January 4, 2017, he released the song "Way You Are" featuring Monty, and the song "Flip Phone" on February 10, 2017. He walked in Philipp Plein's runway show during New York Fashion Week in February 2017.

He released the single "Aye" on May 12, 2017. He released the mixtape Lucky No. 7 on June 7, 2017. On August 18, 2017, he released the single "There She Go" featuring Monty. In October 2017, Fetty Wap featured in Cheat Codes' single "Feels Great" with CVBZ.

On January 19, 2018, Fetty Wap released the EP For My Fans III: The Final Chapter. He released the mixtape Bruce Wayne in June 2018.

In 2018, it was reported that Fetty Wap had signed with Tr3yway Entertainment.

On June 7, 2019, Fetty Wap's birthday, he released the single "Birthday". On September 27, he released the song "Brand New". On February 14, 2020, he released the mixtape Trap & B.

=== 2021–2025: The Butterfly Effect and King Zoo ===
On September 28, 2021, Fetty Wap previewed the song "Out The Hood" in an Instagram video with the caption "10/22 T.B.E", giving speculation of a single or mixtape release. On October 13, 2021, Fetty Wap posted the cover art for his upcoming album The Butterfly Effect, six years following his debut; however on the intro, he sings "it's been seven years." The album was released on October 22, 2021, through 300 Entertainment & RGF Productions, marking the return of Fetty Wap after several mixtapes and numerous legal issues. The title derives from his late daughter, Lauren, where he drew inspiration for many elements of the album. In November 2022, Fetty Wap released his single "Sweet Yamz", a recreation of the song "Yamz" by Masego and Devin Morrison. The song went viral on the video sharing service TikTok and the song received positive reception, with singer Charlie Wilson releasing an unofficial remix through the app, and rapper Snoop Dogg calling it the "song of the year".

In November 2023, Fetty Wap released his third studio album King Zoo, supported by the single released a year prior, "Sweet Yamz". The album was his first release following his incarceration and included a guest appearance from Coi Leray.

In early January 2025, Fetty Wap's song "Again" started to regain popularity on Instagram Reels and TikTok with the phrase saying "Blasting Fetty Wap on a JBL speaker."

In May 2025, Fetty Wap released a song recorded while he was in prison titled "Forever (71943509)" with the number in the title referencing his register number. Along with the song, his brother posted an online petition to end Fetty Wap's federal prison sentence.

=== 2026–present: Release from prison and Zavier ===
On January 6, 2026, Fetty Wap was released from prison after spending over three years incarcerated. On March 16, 2026, he announced his comeback album, titled Zavier. The album was released on March 27, 2026. It features 17 tracks, including features by artists Wiz Khalifa and G Herbo. Fetty Wap described the project as a "reflection of a new chapter in [his] life".

=== Influences ===
Fetty Wap has referred to his music as "ignorant R&B," and combines singing and rapping.

Fetty Wap usually wears the flag of Haiti in honor of a former girlfriend's late grandmother and draws influences from Haitian culture. In an interview with CivilTV, he said that he "fell in love with the culture; people don't know what Haiti means to me." On several occasions, Fetty Wap has also cited Atlanta-based rapper Gucci Mane as a major influence in his music.

== Legal issues ==
Over the years, Fetty Wap has been a defendant in multiple lawsuits and criminal charges, for reasons including copyright infringement, defamation, property damage and assault.

At 1:20 AM on November 2, 2017, he was arrested after being pulled over on a Brooklyn highway. He was subsequently charged with drunk driving, reckless endangerment, aggravated unlicensed operation of a motor vehicle, illegally changing lanes, and drag racing.

On October 29, 2021, federal prosecutors unsealed an indictment against Fetty Wap, charging him with one count of conspiracy to distribute and possess controlled substances. He was arrested at Citi Field in Queens, New York, on federal drug charges. Fetty Wap was released on a $500,000 bond on November 5, 2021. He was put back in jail again on August 8, 2022, after violating the terms of his pretrial release. On August 22, 2022, he pleaded guilty to his drug charges, and, on May 24, 2023, Fetty Wap was sentenced to six years in prison in New York. He was imprisoned at FCI Sandstone, a low-security prison in Sandstone, Minnesota, and was released on January 8, 2026. He will remain under supervised release for the next five years.

== Personal life ==
Fetty Wap is the father of six children with five women.

Fetty Wap and model Alexis Skyy's sex tape was leaked in January 2017. In early 2018, Skyy named Fetty Wap as the father of her daughter. In 2019, Wap publicly stated that he is not Alaiya's biological father, but is still a father figure to her, and his non-paternity was confirmed in December 2020.

Fetty Wap appeared on the third season on VH1's Love & Hip Hop: Hollywood, which documented his relationship with Masika Kalysha. He also appeared on the ninth season of Love & Hip Hop: New York which documented his relationship with Skyy.

In September 2019, Fetty Wap married model Leandra K. Gonzalez; they divorced after a year.

In June 2021, one of Fetty Wap's daughters died at the age of four. TMZ reported that her death certificate stated she had died of complications of a congenital heart arrhythmia, although her mother said on Instagram in August 2021 that the cause of death had not yet been fully determined.

He obtained his GED while imprisoned for federal drug charges.

In November 2026, Fetty Wap married Alexis Hill after their engagement in July.

== Discography ==
Studio albums

- Fetty Wap (2015)
- The Butterfly Effect (2021)
- King Zoo (2023)
- Zavier (2026)

== Awards and nominations ==
Year	Awards	Nominated work	Category	Result	Ref.
2015	MC100 Award	"Trap Queen"	Most-Played Video of the Year	Won	
2015	BET Awards	Himself	Best New Artist	Nominated	
2015	MTV Video Music Awards	"Trap Queen"	Artist to Watch	Won	
2015	MTV Video Music Awards	"Trap Queen"	Best Hip-Hop Video	Nominated	
2015	MTV Video Music Awards	"My Way"	Song of Summer	Nominated	
2015	BET Hip Hop Awards	Himself	Who Blew Up Award	Won	
2015	BET Hip Hop Awards	"Trap Queen"	Best Hip Hop Video	Nominated	
2015	BET Hip Hop Awards	"Trap Queen"	Best Club Banger	Nominated	
2015	BET Hip Hop Awards	"Trap Queen"	People's Champ Award	Nominated	
2015	BET Hip Hop Awards	"My Way" (featuring Monty)	Best Collabo, Duo or Group	Nominated	
2015	American Music Awards	Himself	New Artist of the Year	Nominated	
2015	American Music Awards	Himself	Favorite Rap/Hip-Hop Artist	Nominated	
2016	People's Choice Awards	Himself	Favorite Breakout Artist	Nominated	
2016	Grammy Awards	"Trap Queen"	Best Rap Song	Nominated	
2016	Grammy Awards	"Trap Queen"	Best Rap Performance	Nominated	
2016	iHeartRadio Music Awards	Himself	Best New Artist	Won	
2016	iHeartRadio Music Awards	Himself	Hip Hop Artist of the Year	Nominated	
2016	iHeartRadio Music Awards	"Trap Queen"	Hip Hop Song of the Year	Nominated	
2016	Billboard Music Awards	Himself	Top New Artist	Won	
2016	Billboard Music Awards	Himself	Top Male Artist	Nominated	
2016	Billboard Music Awards	Himself	Top Hot 100 Artist	Nominated	
2016	Billboard Music Awards	Himself	Top Song Sales Artist	Nominated	
2016	Billboard Music Awards	Himself	Top Streaming Songs Artist	Nominated	
2016	Billboard Music Awards	Himself	Top Rap Artist	Nominated	
2016	Billboard Music Awards	"Trap Queen"	Top Hot 100 Song	Nominated	
2016	Billboard Music Awards	"Trap Queen"	Top Streaming Song (Audio)	Nominated	
2016	Billboard Music Awards	"Trap Queen"	Top Streaming Song (Video)	Nominated	
2016	Billboard Music Awards	"Trap Queen"	Top Rap Song	Nominated	
2016	Billboard Music Awards	"679" (featuring Remy Boyz)	Top Rap Song	Nominated	
2016	American Music Awards	Himself	Favorite Rap/Hip-Hop Artist	Nominated	
2016	American Music Awards	"679" (featuring Remy Boyz)	Favorite Rap/Hip-Hop Song	Nominated	
2016	American Music Awards	Fetty Wap	Favorite Rap/Hip-Hop Album	Nominated	
