= Trap Queen =

2014 debut single by Fetty Wap

Single by Fetty Wap

from the album Up Next and Fetty Wap
- Released: April 22, 2014
- Recorded: December 2013
- Genre: Trap; R&B; hip-hop
- Length: 3:42
- Label: RGF; 300
- Songwriters: Willie Maxwell; Anton Matsulevich
- Producer: Tony Fadd

Fetty Wap singles chronology
"Trap Queen" (2014)	"Around the World" (2015)

Music video
- "Trap Queen" on YouTube

"Trap Queen" is the debut single by American rapper Fetty Wap from his self-titled debut album (2015). Following its online premiere in March 2014, it was released independently on April 22, 2014, before being re-released in conjunction with 300 Entertainment on December 15, 2014. "Trap Queen" was also added onto his Up Next mixtape (2014). The song was well received by critics who praised the vocals and production for being cheery and infectious.

"Trap Queen" was a sleeper hit, becoming Fetty Wap's first entry on the Billboard Hot 100 in mid-2015 and ultimately went on to be a top ten hit, peaking at number two; the song spent 25 consecutive weeks in the top ten. Outside the United States, "Trap Queen" peaked within the top ten of the charts in Denmark and the United Kingdom. An accompanying music video for the song, directed by Nitt Da Gritt, was released on his YouTube page that features Wap and his girlfriend partying at their apartment. He first performed the song on television at the 2015 MTV Movie Awards with Fall Out Boy and would make later appearances at The Tonight Show with Jimmy Fallon, Jimmy Kimmel Live!, Nick Cannon Presents Wild 'n Out and the BET Awards 2015 to perform the song. The song received two nominations at the 58th Grammy Awards: Best Rap Song and Best Rap Performance.

== Background and release ==
Fetty Wap, a native of Paterson, New Jersey, had been rapping and recording music locally as a member of the Remy Boyz 1738 rap troupe, which includes Montana "Monty" Buckz. Wap conceived "Trap Queen" in late 2013 and recorded the song the following March after hearing what would become its backing track, which had been produced by Tony Fadd (real name Anton Matsulevich), a musician from Belarus. The backing track was released on Matsulevich's website for free download. It was the first recording on which Wap had sung, as he had been anxious to try "something different". The original studio recording consisted of three sung verses that Wap had freestyled in the melody he had written. The recording was uploaded to SoundCloud shortly after in March 2014, where it soon began amassing plays. An extended version of the initial recording, featuring an additional spoken outro, was included on Wap's Up Next mixtape, which was initially sold locally in Paterson and later released online. This version of the song was also independently released on April 22, 2014, as a standalone digital single under Goodfella4life Entertainment.

Although Wap had a feeling that "Trap Queen" was a potential hit even before recording the song, particularly when he first heard the beat, his suspicions that it could reach an audience outside his own region were confirmed later as he noticed its growing popularity on social media websites like Twitter and Instagram; meanwhile, its play count on SoundCloud had increased to over a million within its first months online. To take advantage of the increased attention the song was receiving, a revised version was subsequently made for radio which shortened the total runtime and included an additional rapped verse following the first iteration of the chorus.

In November 2014, Wap and RGF Productions partnered with Lyor Cohen's label 300 Entertainment to give "Trap Queen" a full-fledged commercial release. The two labels jointly issued the most recent edit of the single to digital retailers on December 15, 2014.

== Composition ==
Written by Fetty Wap and produced by Tony Fadd of RGF Productions, "Trap Queen" is a melodic lofi hip-hop, trap, R&B, and pop rap song. Wap sings most of the song's verses, along with its chorus, in a gritty, melodic delivery reminiscent of contemporary Southern hip-hop artists such as Gucci Mane, Future, Rich Homie Quan, and Young Thug. Wap's sung vocals, particularly during the song's chorus, are digitally altered. One additional verse, following the first iteration of the chorus, is rapped in a more straightforward, traditional style. The song's beat is largely characterized by its trap percussion and synthesized chords.

Lyrically, "Trap Queen" is a giddy, affectionate tribute to a girlfriend and "partner in crime" whom Wap calls his trap queen. Wap has clarified that the song was written about an ex he had been dating and dealing crack cocaine with during his own time in the trap. In its lyrics, Wap proclaims his love for his girlfriend, fondly recalling counting money, going shopping, going to the strip club, getting high, and "cooking pies" with her. The lyrics also express an aspirational quality, with Wap and his girlfriend setting a goal to buy matching Lamborghinis with the money they earn together. Ural Garrett of HipHopDX compared the song's lyrical approach to urban fiction narratives, stating that its themes "wouldn't feel too out of place in writings from Zane, Wahida Clark or Mz. Lady P".

== Critical reception ==
Although some writers called it gimmicky, "Trap Queen" was generally well received by contemporary music critics, especially rap critics. In particular, multiple writers praised the song's "infectious" quality. David Drake of Complex highlighted the song for the December 2014 edition of the publication's Bout to Blow feature, calling it a "sweet, chirpy love song" with a "great chorus and irrepressible cheeriness". Tom Breihan of Stereogum called it "one of the best out-of-nowhere rap anthems in recent history", noting its "stormy-but-melodic beat" and "naggingly catchy hook". In a particularly positive review for The Guardian, Ben Westhoff called the song "a revelation" that "sounds simultaneously familiar and exotic" and ultimately "succeeds as an oddly touching love story". Although Westhoff acknowledged that Wap's singing on "Trap Queen" was more compelling than his rapping, he went on to praise Wap's unique voice and singular aesthetic, also lauding the "dynamic sound" of Tony Fadd's production. Elliot Pearson of the Weekly Alibi called the song an "egalitarian banger dedicated to his partner in crime" and listed it as a recommended single.

"Trap Queen" was named one of the best songs of 2014 in The Huffington Post and Vice magazine's Noisey blog, with the latter publication calling it "the hottest New York City record of the year". In addition, it was named one of the best hip-hop songs of 2014 in XXL. Billboard included "Trap Queen" in its "Top 10 Songs of 2015 (So Far)" list in June 2015, stating "A hearty "Hey, what's up, hello" to one of rap's most uniquely inspired new personalities: Fetty Wap's surprise success story has been all the more enjoyable to witness due to the jubilant debut single on which it is founded. "Trap Queen" is teeming with enough hooks and good vibes to have rightfully taken over 2015's first half." Rolling Stone ranked "Trap Queen" at number 2 on its year-end list to find the 50 best songs of 2015, behind The Weeknd's "Can't Feel My Face".

Billboard ranked "Trap Queen" at number 7 on its year-end list: "Sure, 'Trap Queen' may have been out since the summer of 2014, but it's impossible to think back on 2015 without acknowledging the overwhelming impact of Fetty Wap, with 'Trap Queen' as his first and best anthem. Whether it's the bouncy nature of Tony Fadd's production, Fetty's insanely catchy hooks or his equally singular ad-libs (which rang out continuously in clubs and car stereos nationwide), 'Trap Queen' captured attention on its way to a No. 2 peak on the Hot 100, creating a new superstar along the way." The Village Voice named "Trap Queen" the seventh-best single released in 2015 on their annual year-end critics' poll, Pazz & Jop.

== Chart performance ==
Following its December 2014 re-release, "Trap Queen" became Fetty Wap's nationwide breakthrough and the first major hit single for 300 Entertainment. It debuted on the Billboard Hot 100 at number 86 for the chart dated February 7, 2015. The song entered the chart's top ten seven weeks later, largely on the strength of its streaming activity and digital download sales. It peaked at number two for three consecutive weeks beginning on the chart dated May 16, 2015, held from the top spot by Wiz Khalifa's "See You Again" featuring Charlie Puth. Over the course of its run, "Trap Queen" had also reached number one on Hot Rap Songs and number two on Hot R&B/Hip-Hop Songs, rising to its peak on the latter chart concurrently with taking over the number one position on R&B/Hip-Hop Airplay. By the end of 2015, "Trap Queen" had sold 2,730,000 digital downloads domestically.

"Trap Queen" generated the most on-demand streams in 2015, according to Nielsen Music, with a combined total of 616.46 million audio and video streams. It was one of five songs to surpass 400 million in on-demand streams during the year. On the week of January 26, 2026 "Trap Queen" re-entered the Billboard Hot 100 for the first time in almost 11 years making the song peak at number 37. This was due to Fetty Wap being released from jail three weeks earlier.

== Music video ==
The music video for "Trap Queen", directed by RGF Productions head Nitt Da Gritt, was uploaded to Fetty Wap's YouTube channel on August 7, 2014, and has received more than 793 million views as of October 2022. Set in Wap's home neighborhood in Paterson, New Jersey, the video depicts Wap and his onscreen girlfriend at their apartment and amidst a group of neighbors partying. Wap first arrives to his home in a black BMW convertible, where he is greeted by his girlfriend and joins her inside, where many others are gathered. The two are shown counting money and smoking together, and one shot shows Wap's girlfriend baking a pie. Later, Wap's girlfriend drives a white car to meet Wap on a street at his black convertible, where Wap kisses her and hands her a stack of dollar bills before they walk away together. The remainder of the video shows Wap socializing with neighbors at an outdoor gathering. The video is interspersed with shots of Wap outdoors singing the song while a crowd of neighbors dances and sings along behind him.

Westhoff of The Guardian speculated that the video was filmed on a limited budget, but conceded that it had "a strong vérité quality to it" as a result. He likened the video to a less cinematic version of Juvenile's music video for "Ha".

In June 2015, the video earned Music Choice's first MC100 Award of 2015 for being the service's most-played video of the year up to that point. It was Wap's first award.

== Promotion ==
"Trap Queen" received much of its early attention through social media websites like Twitter and Instagram, where Fetty Wap and his team had directed early promotional efforts for the song. A major early source of exposure through such media was the rapper Bobby Shmurda — at the time enjoying the success of his own viral hit single "Hot Nigga" — who posted a video to his Instagram account on October 16, 2014, in which he sang along to "Trap Queen". "Every girl wants to be a trap queen now, but how you gonna cook crack when you can't even cook breakfast?" would eventually become a popular social media meme inspired by the song.

Toward the end of 2014 and early in 2015, the promotional focus for Wap and his team shifted toward performing live and securing mainstream airplay. By November 2014, the song had begun amassing airplay within the tri-state area from stations like Hot 97; in particular, 300 Entertainment co-founder Todd Moscowitz credited that station's Funkmaster Flex as an important early champion of the song at radio. On February 12, 2015, rap superstar Kanye West brought Wap onstage as a surprise guest at the first annual Roc City Classic concert hosted by Roc Nation and Power 105.1 in Madison Square Park. West proclaimed "Trap Queen" his "favorite song" of the moment, and Jay Z and Beyoncé were seen dancing in the audience together as Wap performed the song. Wap also performed the song at his own shows, including a showcase at South by Southwest, along with further guest performances at shows for Chris Brown and Trey Songz. "Trap Queen" was also the final song performed in Wap's closing set at the 2015 XXL Freshmen show.

In his television debut, Wap performed "Trap Queen" at the 2015 MTV Movie Awards with Fall Out Boy on April 12, 2015. The band opened the performance with part of their own hit single "Centuries" before segueing into Wap's performance of "Trap Queen", for which they provided instrumental and backing vocal accompaniment. Wap also performed the song as a musical guest on two late-night talk shows: first on The Tonight Show Starring Jimmy Fallon May 5, accompanied by The Roots, then on Jimmy Kimmel Live! June 9, accompanied by Brooklyn band Phony Ppl. He also performed the song as a guest on Nick Cannon Presents Wild 'n Out June 24 and as the closing performer on the BET Awards 2015.

=== Remixes ===
Several unofficial remixes and freestyles of "Trap Queen" were released by other artists as the song became more popular. Artists releasing their takes and guest verses on the song included French Montana, Fabolous, Rick Ross and Fat Trel, Yo Gotti, Quavo, Lil' Kim, Shy Glizzy and Da Brat. In particular, Wap favored Quavo's verse, which was later incorporated into the song's official remix, also featuring a verse from Gucci Mane, Wap's favorite rapper. The remix was released commercially on May 4, 2015, in the United States, while an international version featuring an additional verse from Azealia Banks was released on the same day in other territories. In late May 2015, it was reported that a remix featuring Nigerian artists Wizkid, Davido and Ice Prince would be released. In 2015, a version was done by British musician and narrator George the Poet which included mentioning the song's subject and meaning, and frustration with British politics. In June 2015, he released a remix with French rapper Gradur.

== Charts ==
=== Weekly charts ===
Chart (2015)	Peak position
Australia (ARIA)	25
Belgium (Ultratip Bubbling Under Flanders)	4
Belgium (Ultratip Bubbling Under Wallonia)	18
Belgium Urban (Ultratop Flanders)	19
Canada Hot 100 (Billboard)	11
Canada CHR/Top 40 (Billboard)	49
Denmark (Tracklisten)	8
France (SNEP)	17
France Airplay (SNEP)	11
Germany (Official German Charts)	77
Hungary (Stream Top 40)	29
Ireland (IRMA)	26
Italy (FIMI)	86
Netherlands (Single Top 100)	36
New Zealand (Recorded Music NZ)	13
Norway (VG-lista)	28
Sweden (Sverigetopplistan)	23
Switzerland (Schweizer Hitparade)	55
UK Singles (Official Charts)	8
UK Hip Hop/R&B (Official Charts)	1
US Billboard Hot 100	2
US Hot R&B/Hip-Hop Songs (Billboard)	2
US Dance Airplay (Billboard)	24
US Pop Airplay (Billboard)	20
US Hot Rap Songs (Billboard)	1
US Rhythmic Airplay (Billboard)	1

Chart (2026)	Peak position
Global 200 (Billboard)	78
Philippines (Philippines Hot 100)	70
UK Hip Hop/R&B (OCC)	12
US Billboard Hot 100	37

=== Year-end charts ===
Chart (2015)	Position
Australia (ARIA)	96
France (SNEP)	55
Canada (Canadian Hot 100)	20
Netherlands (Single Top 100)	81
New Zealand (Recorded Music NZ)	37
Sweden (Sverigetopplistan)	56
UK Singles (Official Charts Company)	23
US Billboard Hot 100	4
US Hot R&B/Hip-Hop Songs (Billboard)	2
US Rhythmic (Billboard)	4

=== Decade-end charts ===
Chart (2010–2019)	Position
US Billboard Hot 100	41
US Hot R&B/Hip-Hop Songs (Billboard)	11

=== All-time charts ===
Chart (1958–2018)	Position
US Billboard Hot 100	190

== Certifications ==
Region	Certification	Certified units/sales
Australia (ARIA)	Platinum	70,000^{‡}
Denmark (IFPI Danmark)	2× Platinum	180,000^{‡}
Germany (BVMI)	Gold	150,000^{‡}
Italy (FIMI)	Platinum	50,000^{‡}
New Zealand (RMNZ)	5× Platinum	150,000^{‡}
Spain (Promusicae)	Gold	30,000^{‡}
Sweden (GLF)	2× Platinum	80,000^{‡}
United Kingdom (BPI)	3× Platinum	1,800,000^{‡}
United States (RIAA)	2× Diamond	20,000,000^{‡}
^{‡} Sales+streaming figures based on certification alone.

== Release history ==
Date	Format	Version	Label(s)
April 22, 2014	Digital download	Original version	Goodfella4life
December 15, 2014	Digital download	Revised version	RGF; 300
May 4, 2015	Digital download	Remix (featuring Quavo and Gucci Mane)	RGF; 300
May 4, 2015	Digital download	Remix (featuring Azealia Banks, Quavo and Gucci Mane)	RGF; 300
June 29, 2015	Digital download	Remix (featuring Gradur)	RGF; Because
