= List of Billboard Adult Top 40 number-one songs of the 2010s =

The Billboard Adult Top 40 chart ranks the most popular songs on Adult Top 40 radio stations in the United States, based on airplay detections as measured by Nielsen BDS and published weekly by Billboard. These are the songs which reached number one on the Adult Top 40 chart during the 2010s.

== Chart history ==
†	Number-one Adult Top 40 song of the year

Issue date	Song	Artist(s)	Weeks at number one	Ref.
2010
December 5	"Already Gone"	Kelly Clarkson	8	
January 30	"Fireflies"	Owl City	1	
February 6	"Someday"	Rob Thomas	1	
February 13	"Hey, Soul Sister"†	Train	6	
March 27	"Need You Now"	Lady Antebellum	9	
May 29	"Breakeven"	The Script	7	
July 17	"California Gurls"	Katy Perry	9	
September 18	"If It's Love"	Train	2	
October 2	"Misery"	Maroon 5	4	
October 30	"Teenage Dream"	Katy Perry	4	
November 27	"Just the Way You Are"	Bruno Mars	5	
2011
January 1	"Raise Your Glass"	Pink	7	
February 19	"Firework"	Katy Perry	5	
March 26	"F**kin' Perfect"	Pink	7	
May 14	"Rolling in the Deep"†	Adele	13	
August 13	"Good Life"	OneRepublic	4	
September 10	"Last Friday Night (T.G.I.F.)"	Katy Perry	3	
October 1	"Tonight Tonight"	Hot Chelle Rae	1	
October 8	"Moves Like Jagger"	Maroon 5 featuring Christina Aguilera	2	
October 22	"Someone Like You"	Adele	9	
December 24	"Mr. Know It All"	Kelly Clarkson	6	
2012
February 4	"Not Over You"	Gavin DeGraw	1	
February 11	"The One That Got Away"	Katy Perry	1	
February 18	"Set Fire to the Rain"	Adele	4	
March 17	"Stronger (What Doesn't Kill You)"	Kelly Clarkson	8	
May 12	"We Are Young"	Fun featuring Janelle Monáe	3	
June 2	"Somebody That I Used to Know"†	Gotye featuring Kimbra	6	
July 14	"Payphone"	Maroon 5	6	
August 25	"Wide Awake"	Katy Perry	3	
September 15	"Everybody Talks"	Neon Trees	1	
September 22	"Blow Me (One Last Kiss)"	Pink	5	
October 27	"One More Night"	Maroon 5	1	
November 3	"Some Nights"	Fun	1	
November 10	"One More Night"	Maroon 5	7	
December 29	"Home"	Phillip Phillips	1	
2013
January 5	"Ho Hey"†	The Lumineers	8	
March 2	"Try"	Pink	2	
March 16	"I Knew You Were Trouble"	Taylor Swift	1	
March 23	"Daylight"	Maroon 5	4	
April 20	"I Will Wait"	Mumford & Sons	1	
April 27	"When I Was Your Man"	Bruno Mars	2	
May 11	"Just Give Me a Reason"	Pink featuring Nate Ruess	11	
July 27	"Mirrors"	Justin Timberlake	1	
August 3	"Love Somebody"	Maroon 5	3	
August 24	"Blurred Lines"	Robin Thicke featuring T.I. & Pharrell	6	
October 5	"Roar"	Katy Perry	5	
November 9	"Royals"	Lorde	3	
November 30	"Wake Me Up"	Avicii	4	
December 28	"Counting Stars"	OneRepublic	7	
2014
February 15	"Let Her Go"	Passenger	2	
March 1	"Say Something"	A Great Big World & Christina Aguilera	2	
March 15	"Best Day of My Life"†	American Authors	1	
March 22	"Story of My Life"	One Direction	1	
March 29	"Team"	Lorde	1	
April 5	"Happy"	Pharrell Williams	6	
May 17	"All of Me"	John Legend	4	
June 14	"Not a Bad Thing"	Justin Timberlake	1	
June 21	"Ain't It Fun"	Paramore	3	
July 12	"Am I Wrong"	Nico & Vinz	3	
August 2	"Rude"	Magic!	5	
September 6	"Stay with Me"	Sam Smith	2	
September 20	"Maps"	Maroon 5	3	
October 11	"Shake It Off"	Taylor Swift	8	
December 6	"Animals"	Maroon 5	4	
2015
January 3	"Blank Space"	Taylor Swift	6	
February 14	"Take Me to Church"	Hozier	1	
February 21	"Thinking Out Loud"	Ed Sheeran	3	
March 14	"Uptown Funk"	Mark Ronson featuring Bruno Mars	1	
March 21	"Thinking Out Loud"	Ed Sheeran	3	
April 11	"Style"	Taylor Swift	2	
April 25	"Sugar"	Maroon 5	3	
May 16	"Love Me like You Do"	Ellie Goulding	1	
May 23	"Shut Up and Dance" †	Walk the Moon	6	
July 4	"Honey I'm Good"	Andy Grammer	1	
July 11	"Shut Up and Dance" †	Walk the Moon	2	
July 25	"Bad Blood"	Taylor Swift	3	
August 15	"Fight Song"	Rachel Platten	4	
September 12	"Photograph"	Ed Sheeran	6	
October 24	"Renegades"	X Ambassadors	1	
October 31	"Wildest Dreams"	Taylor Swift	4	
November 28	"Ex's & Oh's"	Elle King	1	
December 5	"Hello"	Adele	7	
2016
January 23	"Like I'm Gonna Lose You"	Meghan Trainor featuring John Legend	2	
February 6	"Stitches"	Shawn Mendes	1	
February 13	"On My Mind"	Ellie Goulding	1	
February 20	"Stand by You"	Rachel Platten	3	
March 12	"Stressed Out"	Twenty One Pilots	2	
March 26	"Love Yourself"	Justin Bieber	5	
April 30	"One Call Away"	Charlie Puth	2	
May 14	"7 Years"	Lukas Graham	3	
June 4	"Cake by the Ocean"	DNCE	2	
June 18	"Can't Stop the Feeling!"†	Justin Timberlake	9	
August 20	"Send My Love (To Your New Lover)"	Adele	2	
September 3	"Cheap Thrills"	Sia featuring Sean Paul	7	
October 22	"Treat You Better"	Shawn Mendes	6	
December 3	"Closer"	The Chainsmokers featuring Halsey	4	
December 31	"Don't Wanna Know"	Maroon 5 featuring Kendrick Lamar	9	
2017
March 4	"Scars to Your Beautiful"	Alessia Cara	1	
March 11	"Shape of You" †	Ed Sheeran	12	
June 3	"Say You Won't Let Go"	James Arthur	1	
June 10	"Something Just Like This"	The Chainsmokers and Coldplay	7	
July 29	"Believer"	Imagine Dragons	6	
September 9	"There's Nothing Holdin' Me Back"	Shawn Mendes	4	
October 7	"Attention"	Charlie Puth	1	
October 14	"There's Nothing Holdin' Me Back"	Shawn Mendes	1	
October 21	"Slow Hands"	Niall Horan	1	
October 28	"Feel It Still"	Portugal. The Man	4	
November 25	"What About Us"	Pink	2	
December 9	"Thunder"	Imagine Dragons	7	
2018
January 20	"Perfect" †	Ed Sheeran	6	
March 3	"Havana"	Camila Cabello featuring Young Thug	1	
March 10	"Perfect" †	Ed Sheeran	3	
March 31	"Lights Down Low"	MAX featuring Gnash	3	
April 21	"Meant to Be"	Bebe Rexha featuring Florida Georgia Line	2	
May 5	"The Middle"	Zedd, Maren Morris and Grey	4	
June 2	"Whatever It Takes"	Imagine Dragons	1	
June 9	"The Middle"	Zedd, Maren Morris and Grey	3	
June 30	"Never Be the Same"	Camila Cabello	1	
July 7	"Delicate"	Taylor Swift	4	
August 4	"In My Blood"	Shawn Mendes	1	
August 11	"Girls Like You"	Maroon 5 featuring Cardi B	14	
November 17	"Broken"	Lovelytheband	1	
November 24	"Youngblood"	5 Seconds of Summer	2	
December 8	"High Hopes"	Panic! at the Disco	14	
2019
March 16	"Without Me"	Halsey	1	
March 23	"Be Alright"	Dean Lewis	1	
March 30	"High Hopes"	Panic! at the Disco	1	
April 6	"Eastside"	Benny Blanco, Halsey and Khalid	5	
May 11	"Close to Me"	Ellie Goulding and Diplo featuring Swae Lee	1	
May 18	"Dancing with a Stranger"	Sam Smith and Normani	1	
May 25	"Sucker" †	Jonas Brothers	3	
June 15	"Walk Me Home"	Pink	1	
June 22	"Sucker" †	Jonas Brothers	6	
August 3	"I Don't Care"	Ed Sheeran and Justin Bieber	4	
August 31	"If I Can't Have You"	Shawn Mendes	1	
September 7	"I Don't Care"	Ed Sheeran and Justin Bieber	3	
September 28	"Someone You Loved"	Lewis Capaldi	2	
October 12	"Señorita"	Shawn Mendes and Camila Cabello	2	
October 26	"Someone You Loved"	Lewis Capaldi	3	
November 16	"Señorita"	Shawn Mendes and Camila Cabello	1	
November 23	"Someone You Loved"	Lewis Capaldi	2	
December 7	"Memories"	Maroon 5	13	

== See also ==
- 2010s in music
- List of artists who reached number one on the U.S. Adult Top 40 chart
