= Wildest Dreams =

2015 single by Taylor Swift

Single by Taylor Swift

from the album 1989
- Released: August 31, 2015
- Studio: MXM (Stockholm); Conway (Los Angeles)
- Genre: Synth-pop; dream pop; electropop
- Length: 3:40
- Label: Big Machine
- Songwriters: Taylor Swift; Max Martin; Shellback
- Producers: Max Martin; Shellback

Taylor Swift singles chronology
| "Bad Blood" (2015) | "Wildest Dreams" (2015) | "Out of the Woods" (2016) |

Music video
- "Wildest Dreams" on YouTube

"Wildest Dreams" is a song by the American singer-songwriter Taylor Swift and the fifth single from her fifth studio album, 1989 (2014). Swift wrote the song with the Swedish producers Max Martin and Shellback. "Wildest Dreams" has an atmospheric, balladic production incorporating programmed drums, Mellotron-generated and live strings, and synthesizers; the rhythm interpolates Swift's heartbeat. Critics described it as synth-pop, dream pop, and electropop. The lyrics feature Swift pleading with a lover to remember her even after their relationship ends. Big Machine Records in partnership with Republic Records released "Wildest Dreams" to radio on August 31, 2015.

When the song was first released, some critics found the production and Swift's vocals alluring but others found the track derivative, comparing it to the music of Lana Del Rey. Retrospectively, critics have described "Wildest Dreams" as one of Swift's most memorable songs. The single peaked within the top five on charts of Australia, Canada, Poland, and South Africa. It was certified diamond in Brazil, nine-times platinum in Australia, and double platinum in Portugal and the United Kingdom. In the United States, "Wildest Dreams" peaked at number five and became 1989's fifth consecutive top-ten single on the Billboard Hot 100; it peaked atop three of Billboard's airplay charts. The Recording Industry Association of America (RIAA) certified the track four-times platinum.

Joseph Kahn directed the music video for "Wildest Dreams". Set in Africa in the 1950s, it depicts Swift as a classical Hollywood actress who falls in love with her co-star but ends the fling upon completion of their film project. Media publications praised the production as cinematic but accused the video of glorifying colonialism, a claim that Kahn dismissed. Swift included "Wildest Dreams" in the set lists for two of her world tours, the 1989 World Tour (2015) and the Eras Tour (2023–2024). Following the dispute regarding the ownership of Swift's master recordings in 2019 and the viral popularity of "Wildest Dreams" on the social media site TikTok in 2021, Swift released the re-recorded version "Wildest Dreams (Taylor's Version)".

== Background and production ==
Taylor Swift had identified as a country musician, up until her fourth studio album, Red, which was released on October 22, 2012. Red's eclectic pop and rock styles beyond the country stylings of Swift's past albums led to critics questioning her country-music identity. Swift began writing songs for her fifth studio album in mid-2013 while touring. She was inspired by 1980s synth-pop to create her fifth studio album, 1989, which she described as her first "official pop album" and named after her birth year. The album makes extensive use of synthesizers, programmed drum machines, and electronic and dance stylings, a stark contrast to the acoustic arrangements of her country-styled albums.

Swift and Max Martin served as executive producers of 1989. On the album's standard edition, Martin and his frequent collaborator Shellback produced 7 out of 13 songs, including "Wildest Dreams". Swift wrote "Wildest Dreams" with Martin and Shellback, who both produced and programmed the song and played the keyboards. Martin played the piano, and Shellback played the electric guitar and percussion. Mattias Bylund joined the production of "Wildest Dreams" after Martin played the track to him; Bylund played and arranged the strings, which he recorded and edited at his home studio in Tuve, Sweden. Michael Ilbert and Sam Holland, assisted by Cory Bice, recorded the track at MXM Studios in Stockholm and Conway Recording Studios in Los Angeles. It was mixed by Serban Ghenea at MixStar Studios in Virginia Beach and mastered by Tom Coyne at Sterling Sound in New York.

== Music and lyrics ==
"Wildest Dreams"
"Wildest Dreams" has a balladic production that incorporates synths, Mellotron-generated and live strings, and it interpolates Swift's heartbeat in its rhythm. Swift sings with breathy vocals.

"Wildest Dreams" is a power ballad that interpolates Swift's heartbeat in its rhythm. It incorporates programmed drums, pulsing synths, and staccato strings generated with a Mellotron. In the chorus, the melody is accentuated by live strings overdubbed on the Mellon strings, using what Bylund described as "Coldplay-type rhythm chords". Swift sings with breathy vocals. According to Jon Caramanica from The New York Times, she sings "drowsily" in the verses and "skips up an octave" in the bridge. Jem Aswad of Billboard said that she "[flits] between a fluttery soprano and deadpan alto". Music critics characterized the genre as synth-pop, dream pop, and electropop, with elements of chillwave. Although the synths and drums were a stark contrast to Swift's earlier music, the musicologist James E. Perone said that the composition retained some elements from her previous country songs: the "heavy use" of the pentatonic scale in the melody and the move between major and minor chords in the chorus.

In the lyrics, Swift's narrator tells a lover to remember her after their relationship ends while still being in love with him. Despite the inevitable ending, the narrator acknowledges the strong romantic and sexual connection with this man and strives to build fond memories with him. The first verse is about lust: "He's so tall, and handsome as hell/ He's so bad, but he does it so well/ I can see the end as it begins." She expresses her desire to live on in the lover's memory as a woman with red lips, "standing in a nice dress, staring at the sunset". She cautions the lover that she will haunt him: "Say you'll see me again even if it's just in your wildest dreams." The bridge is set in double time and sees Swift's character affirming, "You see me in hindsight/ Tangled up with you all night/ Burnin' it down."

Critics have described the sound as sultry, sensual, and dramatic, comparing the production and the theme of failed romance to the music of the singer-songwriter Lana Del Rey. The Guardian's Alexis Petridis felt that the song abandoned Swift's previous "persona of the pathetic female appendage snivelling over her bad-boy boyfriend" and instead portrayed the man as her victim. Slate's Forrest Wickman thought that Swift's character was a "sort of [...] femme fatale". Robert Leedham of Drowned in Sound wrote that the lyrics portrayed her arrogance and confidence to "[move] onto better things", contrasting with the victim mentality on her past songs.

== Release and commercial performance ==
Big Machine Records released 1989 on October 27, 2014; "Wildest Dreams" is number nine on the standard edition's track listing. The song debuted at number 76 on the US Billboard Hot 100 in November 2014. On August 5, 2015, Swift shared on Twitter that "Wildest Dreams" would be the fifth single from 1989, following four Hot 100 top-10 singles: "Shake It Off", "Blank Space", "Style", and "Bad Blood". In the United States, Big Machine and Republic Records released "Wildest Dreams" to hot adult contemporary radio on August 31, and contemporary hit radio on September 1, 2015. Big Machine released a remix by R3hab for download via the iTunes Store on October 15, and Universal Music released the original version to Italian radio on October 30.

On the Billboard Hot 100, "Wildest Dreams" re-entered at number 15 on the chart dated September 19, 2015, after its single release. It reached number 10 on October 10, 2015, and became 1989's fifth consecutive top-10 single. In the Billboard issue dated November 7, 2015, the single peaked at number five on the Hot 100 and became 1989's fifth consecutive number-one song on two Billboard's airplay charts: Pop Songs and Adult Pop Songs; 1989 tied with Katy Perry's Teenage Dream (2010) to become the album with the most Adult Pop Songs number ones. On Billboard's Dance/Mix Show Airplay chart, supported by the R3hab remix, "Wildest Dreams" was Swift's first number one and made her the first female artist to have five top-10 songs in a calendar year. "Wildest Dreams" was certified four-times platinum by the Recording Industry Association of America (RIAA) and had sold two million digital copies in the United States by November 2017.

"Wildest Dreams" reached the top 10 on the singles charts of Canada (4), South Africa (5), Venezuela (6), Iceland (8), New Zealand (8), Slovakia (8), and Scotland (9). It received platinum or higher certifications in Brazil (diamond), Portugal (double platinum), and the United Kingdom (double platinum). It received platinum certifications in Austria, Canada, Denmark, Italy, New Zealand, and Spain. The track also received gold certifications in Germany and Norway. In Australia, the single peaked at number three on the ARIA Singles Chart and was certified nine-times platinum by the Australian Recording Industry Association (ARIA).

== Critical reception ==
When it was first released, "Wildest Dreams" received mixed reviews from music critics. Petridis found it "hugely cheering" that Swift employed a new perspective in her songwriting. Caramanica said that the song had the "most pronounced vocal tweak" on 1989, demonstrating Swift's new ways of expressing herself in music. The Arizona Republic's Ed Masley found the track "haunting" and Swift's vocals "seductive". Sam Lansky of Time described the production as "lush" and full of "cinematic grandeur". Writing for Hot Press, Paul Nolan picked it as the album's best track for its combination of chillwave and "sweeping, singalong choruses". The song helped Swift win the Songwriter of the Year Award at the 2016 BMI Pop Awards and was recognized at the 2017 ASCAP Awards.

Other reviews opined that the track was influenced by Lana Del Rey to an extent that it erased Swift's authenticity. Aswad said that it was "hard to tell if the song is homage or parody", and Wickman and Mikael Wood of the Los Angeles Times opined that Swift's songwriting lost its distinctive quality. Shane Kimberline from MusicOMH and Lindsay Zoladz from Vulture deemed "Wildest Dreams" one of the album's weakest tracks and took issue with the Del Rey resemblance in Swift's vocals and lyrics. Slant Magazine's Annie Galvin said Swift's vocals complemented the narrative lyrics but described the song as a "misguided imitation" of Del Rey with a predictable storyline. In The Atlantic, Kevin O'Keeffe argued that the Del Rey comparisons were "unfair", and Emma Green praised the storytelling lyrics and contended that they were "unabashed, all-consuming, earnest nostalgia, anticipating", which she deemed distinct from Del Rey's "performative, cool-girl nostalgia".

Retrospectively, Rob Sheffield of Rolling Stone wrote in 2019 that the song "sounds stronger and stronger over the years". NME's Hannah Mylrae called it a "beauty", and Nate Jones from Vulture considered it one of Swift's 10 best songs and specifically lauded the "invigorating double-time bridge". The bridge was ranked 66th on Billboard's 2021 list of the 100 Greatest Song Bridges of the 21st Century. Alex Hudson and Megan LaPierre of Exclaim! included "Wildest Dreams" in their list of the best 20 songs by Swift, saying that she "totally nails" the Del Rey resemblance. Jane Song from Paste lauded the "dark Lana Del Rey-esque pop" production and opined that the lyrics about memory made the song have "more staying power than you'd expect". Petridis ranked it 18th out of 44 singles Swift had released by April 2019, and he said that the song employed a Del Rey-inspired songwriting trope with a "smart, pleasing twist".

== Music video ==
=== Development and synopsis ===
Joseph Kahn directed the music video for "Wildest Dreams", the third time he directed a music video for a 1989 single after "Blank Space" and "Bad Blood". Filming primarily took place in Botswana and South Africa. Inspired by The Secret Conversations (2013), a memoir of the actress Ava Gardner, Swift conceived the premise for the video as an illicit love affair between two actors in an isolated place within Africa, because they could only interact with each other without other means of communication. Kahn took inspiration from romantic films set in Africa, such as The African Queen (1951), Out of Africa (1985), and The English Patient (1996).

The video's narrative focuses on an affair between a classical Hollywood actress (Swift) and her male co-star (Scott Eastwood) who shoot a film in 1950s Africa. Kahn compared the affair to the romance between Elizabeth Taylor and Richard Burton. The pair gets involved romantically off-screen, as the video features shots of wildlife such as giraffes, zebras, and lions in a broad savanna. The affair turns sour after a fight on set. As the romance ends, the pair is seen shooting in front of a savanna backdrop in a California studio. At the film's premiere, Swift's character sees her co-star with his wife. During the screening, Swift's character flees the theater and gets into a waiting limousine, as the co-star runs into the street and watches her leave.

=== Release and reception ===
The video premiered on television during the pre-show of the 2015 MTV Video Music Awards on August 30. Swift donated all of the proceeds from the video to the African Parks Foundation of America for wild animal conservation causes. Rolling Stone's Brittany Spanos commented that Swift and Eastwood channeled "retro Hollywood glamour", and Billboard's Natalie Weiner deemed Elizabeth Taylor an influence on Swift's fashion in the video. ABC News described the video as visually powerful, and Wickman found the production cinematic and the narrative "a lot more engaging" than the music video for "Style". Mike Wass of Idolator said that although Swift and Eastwood did not have a strong "chemistry", the African scenery and narrative "all [hang] together rather nicely". The video was nominated for Best Fresh Video at the 2016 MTV Italian Music Awards.

Many online blogs and publications contended that the video glorified "white colonialism" by featuring a white cast in Africa. Critics opined that it portrayed a romanticized nostalgia for colonial Africa held by white people and neglected the struggles of the African peoples during the European colonization. The African studies professor Matthew Carotenuto wrote that the storyline depicted "pith-helmet-and-khaki-clad men as civilizing heroes and the women who joined them roughing it in tents wearing lingerie". In the book Mistaking Africa, the history and political science authors Curtis Keim and Carolyn Somerville wrote that "Wildest Dreams" reinforced the stereotypes associated with Africa and "the mistaken perception held by many Americans that large game are found everywhere in Africa and that all parts of Africa are identical". Kahn defended the video and said that featuring a black cast would be historically inaccurate for the 1950s settings. Lauretta Charlton of Vulture felt that the accusations were overblown: although she acknowledged that the video's depiction of Africa was problematic, she regarded it as "antiquated" and recommended the audience to focus on the "modern-day colonialism of Africa" that demanded urgent attention.

Some journalists and academics analyzed the video in the context of Swift's celebrity and the historical Hollywood depictions of Africa. Carotenuto opined that Swift was part of a "Lion King generation", which led her to think of Africa as "nothing more than a rich tapestry of flora and fauna, with actual Africans fading onto the periphery", an idea that had been propagated by Hollywood films and popular American culture. The Atlantic's Spencer Kornhaber wrote that her generation was when "certain symbols of white dominance [...] have been glorified". For Kornhaber, "Wildest Dreams" was in line with Swift's artistic vision of "a powerful but vague nostalgia, defined less by time period than by particular strains of influence that just happen to be affiliated with a certain skin color". Kornhaber and Tshepo Mokoena from The Guardian argued that the criticism was not meant to portray Swift as racist. The former contended that it was a "lesson" for Swift about "how nostalgia can be inherently political"; the latter said that the video was a "clumsy move, but not one that merits outrage", but the criticism blemished Swift's "America's sweetheart" reputation.

== Live performances ==
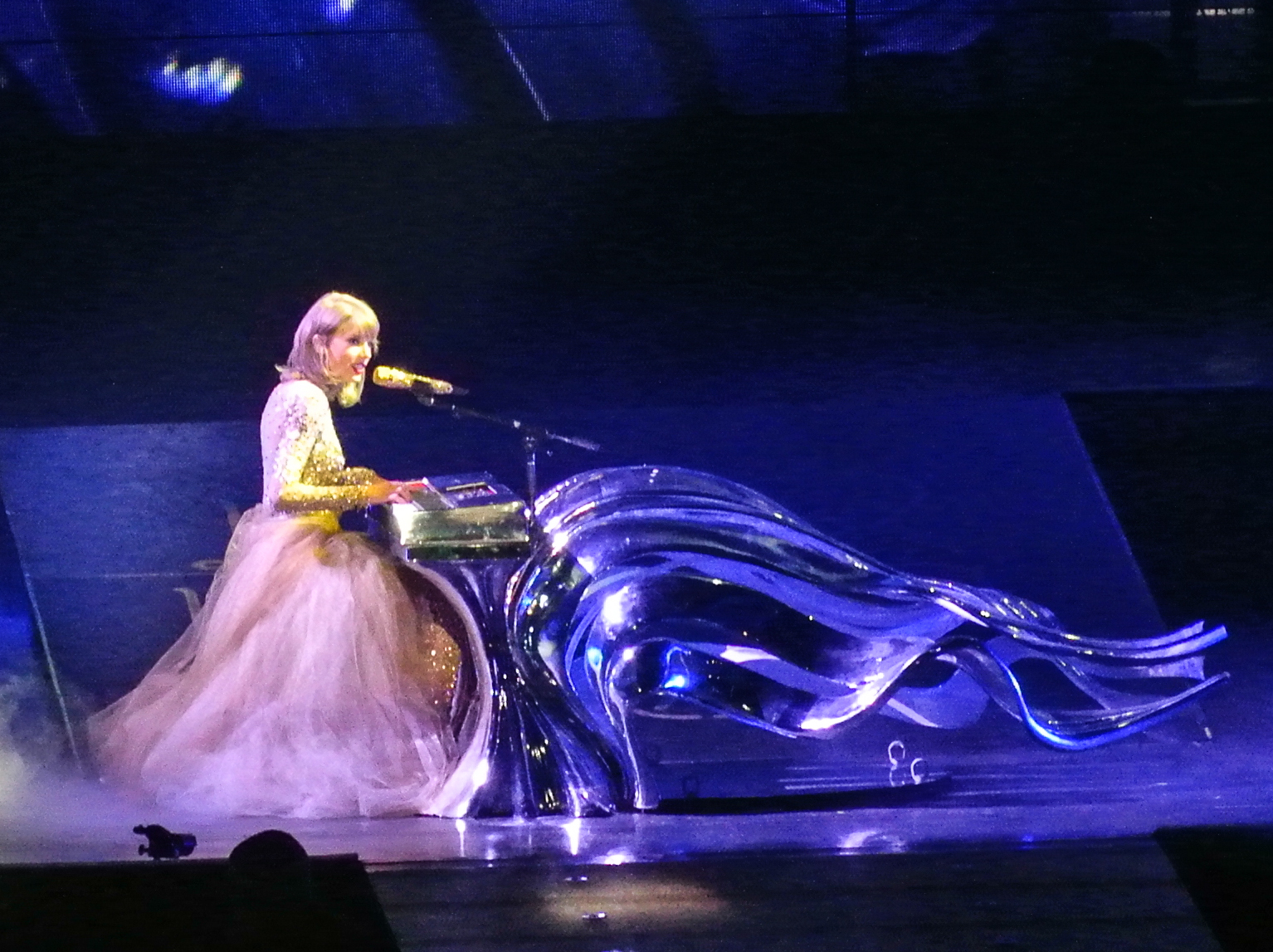
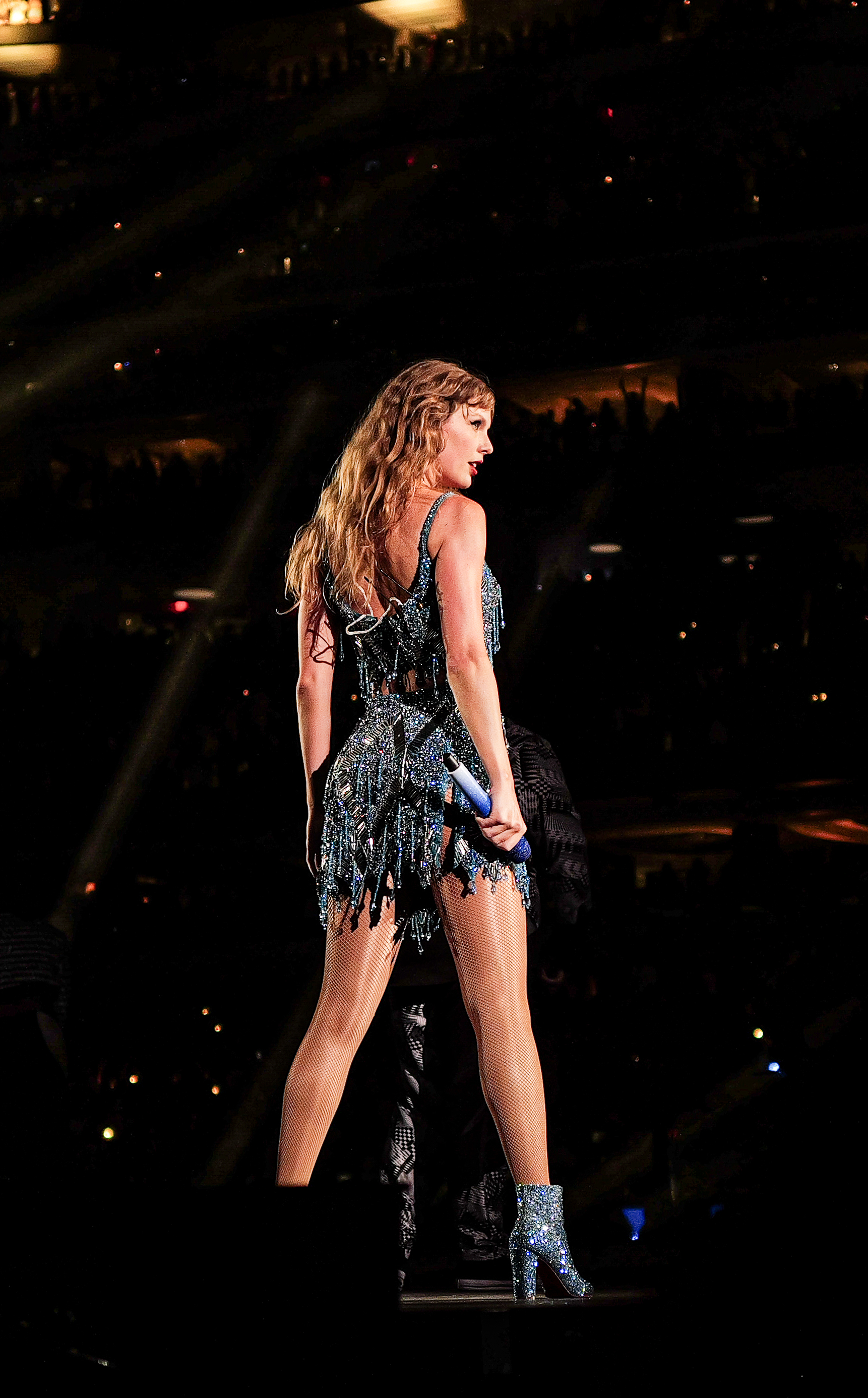
Swift performed "Wildest Dreams" as part of a mashup with "Enchanted" on a grand piano on the 1989 World Tour (left); she performed it as a standalone number on the Eras Tour (right).

On the 1989 World Tour (2015), Swift performed the song as part of a mashup with "Enchanted", from her 2010 album Speak Now. Playing a sparkling grand piano, she first sang "Wildest Dreams" and, after the second chorus, proceeded with "Enchanted". The rendition built up with accompanying synths and backing vocals. She finished the mashup by changing costumes from a sparkling tulle skirt to a bodysuit for the next number. The Ringer's Nora Princiotti in March 2023 deemed it Swift's best live performance, praising it as an "epic five-and-a-half-minute medley [that] is fundamentally simple".

"Wildest Dreams" was included in Swift's other concerts. On September 30, 2015, she performed a stripped-down rendition on an electric guitar as part of the "Taylor Swift Experience" exhibition at the Grammy Museum at L.A. Live. At a private concert for 100 fans in Hamilton Island, Australia, as part of Nova's "Red Room" series, Swift "Wildest Dreams" on an acoustic guitar. Swift included the "Wildest Dreams"/"Enchanted" mashup in the set lists of two concerts: at the United States Grand Prix in Austin on October 22, 2016, and at the Super Saturday Night, a pre-Super Bowl event, on February 4, 2017.

Swift performed "Wildest Dreams" as a "surprise song" outside the regular set list twice on her Reputation Stadium Tour in 2018: at the first show in Santa Clara, California, on May 11, and at the second show in Tokyo, Japan, on November 21. At the Philadelphia concert of the Reputation Stadium Tour on July 14, she sang "Wildest Dreams" a cappella after a stage device malfunctioned. On the Eras Tour (2023–2024), a tour that Swift described as a tribute to all of her albums, she performed the song as part of the 1989 act as the screen projected scenes of a couple in bed.

== Ryan Adams cover ==
The singer-songwriter Ryan Adams released his track-by-track cover album of 1989 on September 21, 2015. Adams said that Swift's 1989 helped him cope with emotional hardships and that he wanted to sing the songs from his perspective "like it was Bruce Springsteen's Nebraska". Before the album's release, Adams previewed his cover of "Wildest Dreams" online in August. He switches and adjusts pronouns in some places; the lyric "Standing in a nice dress" becomes "Standing in your nice dress". His version combines country rock, alternative country, and jangle pop. It uses acoustic instruments of live drums and guitar strums.

Adams's "Wildest Dreams" peaked at number 40 on Billboard's Hot Rock & Alternative Songs chart. Kornharber found the cover "undeniably lovely", Jeremy Winograd of Slant Magazine deemed it a tasteful incorporation of 1980s rock, and Marc Burrows of Drowned in Sound preferred Adams's cover to Swift's version. Sarah Murphy in Exclaim! labeled the cover "an equally impressive feat" that could resonate with Swift's fans who lamented her departure from country music. In The Guardian, Michael Cragg said that there were no substantial additions in Adams's cover, which he described as a "fairly rudimentary strumalong", and Rachel Aroesti found it "comical" that it failed to match the original. Caramanica said that the lyrical alterations brought "no real effect".

== Credits and personnel ==
Credits are adapted from the liner notes of 1989.

- Taylor Swift – vocals, writer, heart sounds
- Max Martin – producer, writer, keyboard, piano, programming
- Shellback – producer, writer, acoustic guitar, electric guitar, keyboard, percussion, programming
- Mattias Bylund – string arrangements, recording, and editing
- Michael Ilbert – recording
- Sam Holland – recording
- Cory Bice – assistant recording
- Serban Ghenea – mixing
- John Hanes – engineered for mix
- Tom Coyne – mastering

== Charts ==
=== Weekly charts ===
2015–2016 weekly chart performance
| Chart (2015–2016) | Peak position |
|---|---|
| Australia (ARIA) | 3 |
| Austria (Ö3 Austria Top 40) | 21 |
| Belgium (Ultratop 50 Flanders) | 33 |
| Belgium (Ultratip Bubbling Under Wallonia) | 24 |
| Canada Hot 100 (Billboard) | 4 |
| Canada AC (Billboard) | 2 |
| Canada CHR/Top 40 (Billboard) | 1 |
| Canada Hot AC (Billboard) | 1 |
| Czech Republic Airplay (ČNS IFPI) | 25 |
| Finland Airplay (Radiosoittolista) | 7 |
| Finland Download (Latauslista) | 15 |
| France (SNEP) | 122 |
| Greece Digital Songs (Billboard) | 3 |
| Guatemala Airplay (Monitor Latino) | 11 |
| Hungary (Single Top 40) | 35 |
| Iceland (RÚV) | 8 |
| Ireland (IRMA) | 39 |
| Lebanon (Lebanese Top 20) | 14 |
| Mexico (Billboard Mexico Airplay) | 46 |
| Mexico Anglo (Monitor Latino) | 16 |
| Netherlands (Dutch Top 40 Tipparade) | 12 |
| New Zealand (Recorded Music NZ) | 8 |
| Poland Airplay (ZPAV) | 3 |
| Scottish Singles Sales (Official Charts) | 9 |
| Slovakia Airplay (ČNS IFPI) | 8 |
| Slovenia (SloTop50) | 14 |
| South Africa Airplay (EMA) | 5 |
| UK Singles (Official Charts) | 40 |
| US Billboard Hot 100 | 5 |
| US Adult Contemporary (Billboard) | 2 |
| US Adult Pop Airplay (Billboard) | 1 |
| US Dance Airplay (Billboard) | 1 |
| US Latin Airplay (Billboard) | 44 |
| US Pop Airplay (Billboard) | 1 |
| US Rhythmic Airplay (Billboard) | 25 |
| Venezuela (Record Report) | 6 |

2021 weekly chart performance
| Chart (2021) | Peak position |
|---|---|
| Czech Republic Singles Digital (ČNS IFPI) | 28 |
| Germany (GfK) | 51 |
| Global 200 (Billboard) | 170 |
| Portugal (AFP) | 57 |
| Slovakia (Singles Digitál Top 100) | 47 |
| Sweden (Sverigetopplistan) | 53 |
| Switzerland (Schweizer Hitparade) | 53 |

=== Year-end charts ===
2015 year-end charts
| Chart (2015) | Position |
|---|---|
| Australia (ARIA) | 41 |
| Canada (Canadian Hot 100) | 39 |
| US Billboard Hot 100 | 57 |
| US Adult Contemporary (Billboard) | 27 |
| US Adult Pop Songs (Billboard) | 28 |
| US Pop Songs (Billboard) | 30 |

2016 year-end charts
| Chart (2016) | Position |
|---|---|
| Canada (Canadian Hot 100) | 70 |
| US Billboard Hot 100 | 79 |
| US Adult Contemporary (Billboard) | 3 |
| US Adult Pop Songs (Billboard) | 28 |

== Certifications ==
Certifications for "Wildest Dreams"
| Region | Certification | Certified units/sales |
|---|---|---|
| Australia (ARIA) | 9× Platinum | 630,000^{‡} |
| Austria (IFPI Austria) | Platinum | 30,000^{‡} |
| Brazil (Pro-Música Brasil) | Diamond | 250,000^{‡} |
| Canada (Music Canada) | Platinum | 80,000^{*} |
| Denmark (IFPI Danmark) | Platinum | 90,000^{‡} |
| France (SNEP) | Platinum | 200,000^{‡} |
| Germany (BVMI) | Gold | 200,000^{‡} |
| Italy (FIMI) | Platinum | 100,000^{‡} |
| New Zealand (RMNZ) | 3× Platinum | 90,000^{‡} |
| Norway (IFPI Norway) | Gold | 30,000^{‡} |
| Portugal (AFP) | 2× Platinum | 20,000^{‡} |
| Spain (Promusicae) | Platinum | 60,000^{‡} |
| United Kingdom (BPI) | 2× Platinum | 1,200,000^{‡} |
| United States (RIAA) | 4× Platinum | 4,000,000^{‡} |
^{*} Sales figures based on certification alone.^{‡} Sales+streaming figures based on certification alone.

== Release history ==
Release dates and formats
| Region | Date | Format(s) | Label(s) | Ref. |
|---|---|---|---|---|
| United States | August 31, 2015 | Hot adult contemporary radio | Big Machine; Republic | |
| United States | September 1, 2015 | Contemporary hit radio | Big Machine; Republic | |
| Various | October 15, 2015 | Digital download; streaming; (R3hab remix) | Big Machine | |
| Italy | October 30, 2015 | Radio airplay | Universal | |

== "Wildest Dreams (Taylor's Version)" ==
"Wildest Dreams (Taylor's Version)"

Promotional single by Taylor Swift

from the album 1989 (Taylor's Version)
- Released: September 17, 2021
- Studio: Kitty Committee (London)
- Genre: Synth-pop
- Length: 3:40
- Label: Republic
- Songwriters: Taylor Swift; Max Martin; Shellback
- Producers: Taylor Swift; Shellback; Christopher Rowe

Audio video
- "Wildest Dreams (Taylor's Version)" on YouTube

Swift departed from Big Machine and signed a new contract with Republic Records in 2018. She began re-recording her first six studio albums in November 2020. The decision followed a 2019 dispute between Swift and the talent manager Scooter Braun, who acquired Big Machine Records, over the masters of Swift's albums that the label had released. By re-recording the albums, Swift had full ownership of the new masters, which enabled her to encourage licensing of her re-recorded songs for commercial use in hopes of substituting the Big Machine-owned masters. She denoted the re-recordings with a "Taylor's Version" subtitle.

The re-recording of "Wildest Dreams" is titled "Wildest Dreams (Taylor's Version)". Its snippets were featured in the March–May trailers for the 2021 animated film Spirit Untamed by DreamWorks Animation. On September 17, 2021, Swift released "Wildest Dreams (Taylor's Version)" onto digital and streaming platforms. The release followed the viral success of the original song on the video-sharing platform TikTok, which lead to an increase in streams. "Wildest Dreams (Taylor's Version)" is included as part of 1989 (Taylor's Version), the re-recorded version of 1989, which was released on October 27, 2023.

=== Production and reception ===
"Wildest Dreams (Taylor's Version)" is a synth-pop song that replicates the original's production. Swift produced the song with Shellback and Christopher Rowe, a Nashville-based vocal engineer who had produced her re-recorded album Fearless (Taylor's Version). Although Martin did not return as producer, the musicians were those from Swift's backing band during the 1989 sessions. Aroesti remarked that the re-recorded version was almost identical to the original but was "sometimes bassier". Robin Murray of Clash said that it contained "subtle stylist[ic] shifts", and Stereogum's Tom Breihan found it more "muted". Mary Siroky of Consequence appreciated that the production took "great care to capture the sound of the original, right down to a riff in the second chorus". Murray and Siroky praised Swift's vocals as having improved.

Within four hours, "Wildest Dreams (Taylor's Version)" amassed over two million streams on Spotify, surpassing the original version's biggest single-day streaming tally on the platform. In the United States, it debuted at number 37 on the Billboard Hot 100 for the week ending September 23, 2021. In both Ireland and the United Kingdom, "Wildest Dreams (Taylor's Version)" surpassed the peak positions of the original version (15–39 and 25–40). After 1989 (Taylor's Version) was released, "Wildest Dreams (Taylor's Version)" peaked at number 19 on the Billboard Global 200 and re-entered and peaked at number 19 on the Hot 100 chart dated November 11, 2023. The song reached the top 10 in Malaysia (10) and Singapore (5). It peaked in the top 40 in Australia (14), the Philippines (15), Canada (18), Hungary (29), and New Zealand (30). It was certified double platinum in Australia, platinum in the United Kingdom, and gold in New Zealand and Greece.

=== Credits and personnel ===
- Taylor Swift – lead vocals, songwriting, production
- Christopher Rowe – production, vocal engineering
- Shellback – songwriting, production
- Max Martin – songwriting
- Mattias Bylund – record engineering, editing, strings arrangement, synthesizer
- Max Bernstein – guitar, synthesizer, synthesizer programming
- Mike Meadows – synthesizer, synthesizer programming
- Dan Burns – synthesizer programming
- Matt Billingslea – drums, percussion
- Amos Heller – bass
- Paul Sidoti – guitar
- Mattias Johansson – violin
- David Bukovinszky – cello
- Serban Ghenea – mixing
- John Hanes – engineering
- Randy Merrill – master engineering

=== Charts ===
Weekly chart performance
| Chart (2021–2023) | Peak position |
|---|---|
| Australia (ARIA) | 14 |
| Canada (Canadian Hot 100) | 18 |
| Canada AC (Billboard) | 33 |
| Euro Digital Song Sales (Billboard) | 10 |
| France (SNEP) | 182 |
| Global 200 (Billboard) | 19 |
| Greece International (IFPI) | 39 |
| Hungary (Single Top 40) | 29 |
| Ireland (IRMA) | 15 |
| Lithuania (AGATA) | 88 |
| Malaysia (RIM) | 10 |
| Netherlands (Single Top 100) | 69 |
| New Zealand (Recorded Music NZ) | 30 |
| Philippines (Billboard) | 15 |
| Singapore (RIAS) | 5 |
| South Africa (RISA) | 63 |
| Sweden (Sverigetopplistan) | 95 |
| UK Singles (Official Charts) | 25 |
| US Billboard Hot 100 | 19 |
| US Adult Contemporary (Billboard) | 23 |
| Vietnam (Vietnam Hot 100) | 80 |

=== Certifications ===
Certifications for "Wildest Dreams (Taylor's Version)"
| Region | Certification | Certified units/sales |
|---|---|---|
| Australia (ARIA) | 2× Platinum | 140,000^{‡} |
| Brazil (Pro-Música Brasil) | 2× Platinum | 80,000^{‡} |
| Canada (Music Canada) | 2× Platinum | 160,000^{‡} |
| Denmark (IFPI Danmark) | Gold | 45,000^{‡} |
| New Zealand (RMNZ) | 2× Platinum | 60,000^{‡} |
| Poland (ZPAV) | Gold | 25,000^{‡} |
| United Kingdom (BPI) | Platinum | 600,000^{‡} |
Streaming
| Greece (IFPI Greece) | Gold | 1,000,000^{†} |
^{‡} Sales+streaming figures based on certification alone.^{†} Streaming-only figures based on certification alone.

== See also ==
- List of Billboard Adult Top 40 number-one songs of the 2010s
- List of Billboard Mainstream Top 40 number-one songs of 2015
- List of Billboard Hot 100 top-ten singles in 2015
