= List of Billboard Mainstream Top 40 number-one songs of 2015 =

This is a list of the U.S. Billboard magazine Mainstream Top 40 number-one songs of 2015.

During 2015, a total of 19 singles hit number-one on the charts.

== Chart history ==
Key
†	Indicates best-performing single of 2015

Issue date	Song	Artist(s)	Ref.
January 3	"Blank Space"	Taylor Swift	
January 10	"Blank Space"	Taylor Swift	
January 17	"Blank Space"	Taylor Swift	
January 24	"Blank Space"	Taylor Swift	
January 31	"Blank Space"	Taylor Swift	
February 7	"Uptown Funk" †	Mark Ronson featuring Bruno Mars	
February 14	"Uptown Funk" †	Mark Ronson featuring Bruno Mars	
February 21	"Uptown Funk" †	Mark Ronson featuring Bruno Mars	
February 28	"Uptown Funk" †	Mark Ronson featuring Bruno Mars	
March 7	"Uptown Funk" †	Mark Ronson featuring Bruno Mars	
March 14	"Uptown Funk" †	Mark Ronson featuring Bruno Mars	
March 21	"Thinking Out Loud"	Ed Sheeran	
March 28	"Style"	Taylor Swift	
April 4	"Style"	Taylor Swift	
April 11	"Style"	Taylor Swift	
April 18	"Sugar"	Maroon 5	
April 25	"Sugar"	Maroon 5	
May 2	"Love Me Like You Do"	Ellie Goulding	
May 9	"Love Me Like You Do"	Ellie Goulding	
May 16	"Love Me Like You Do"	Ellie Goulding	
May 23	"Earned It"	The Weeknd	
May 30	"See You Again"	Wiz Khalifa featuring Charlie Puth	
June 6	"See You Again"	Wiz Khalifa featuring Charlie Puth	
June 13	"See You Again"	Wiz Khalifa featuring Charlie Puth	
June 20	"See You Again"	Wiz Khalifa featuring Charlie Puth	
June 27	"Want to Want Me"	Jason Derulo	
July 4	"Bad Blood"	Taylor Swift featuring Kendrick Lamar	
July 11	"Bad Blood"	Taylor Swift featuring Kendrick Lamar	
July 18	"Bad Blood"	Taylor Swift featuring Kendrick Lamar	
July 25	"Bad Blood"	Taylor Swift featuring Kendrick Lamar	
August 1	"Bad Blood"	Taylor Swift featuring Kendrick Lamar	
August 8	"Cheerleader" (Felix Jaehn Remix)	OMI	
August 15	"Cheerleader" (Felix Jaehn Remix)	OMI	
August 22	"Can't Feel My Face"	The Weeknd	
August 29	"Can't Feel My Face"	The Weeknd	
September 5	"Can't Feel My Face"	The Weeknd	
September 12	"Can't Feel My Face"	The Weeknd	
September 19	"Lean On"	Major Lazer and DJ Snake featuring MØ	
September 26	"Good for You"	Selena Gomez featuring A$AP Rocky	
October 3	"Good for You"	Selena Gomez featuring A$AP Rocky	
October 10	"Locked Away"	R. City featuring Adam Levine	
October 17	"Locked Away"	R. City featuring Adam Levine	
October 24	"What Do You Mean?"	Justin Bieber	
October 31	"What Do You Mean?"	Justin Bieber	
November 7	"Wildest Dreams"	Taylor Swift	
November 14	"Wildest Dreams"	Taylor Swift	
November 21	"Stitches"	Shawn Mendes	
November 28	"Stitches"	Shawn Mendes	
December 5	"Hello"	Adele	
December 12	"Hello"	Adele	
December 19	"Hello"	Adele	
December 26	"Hello"	Adele	

== See also ==
- 2015 in American music
