= List of Billboard Adult Contemporary number ones of 2015 =

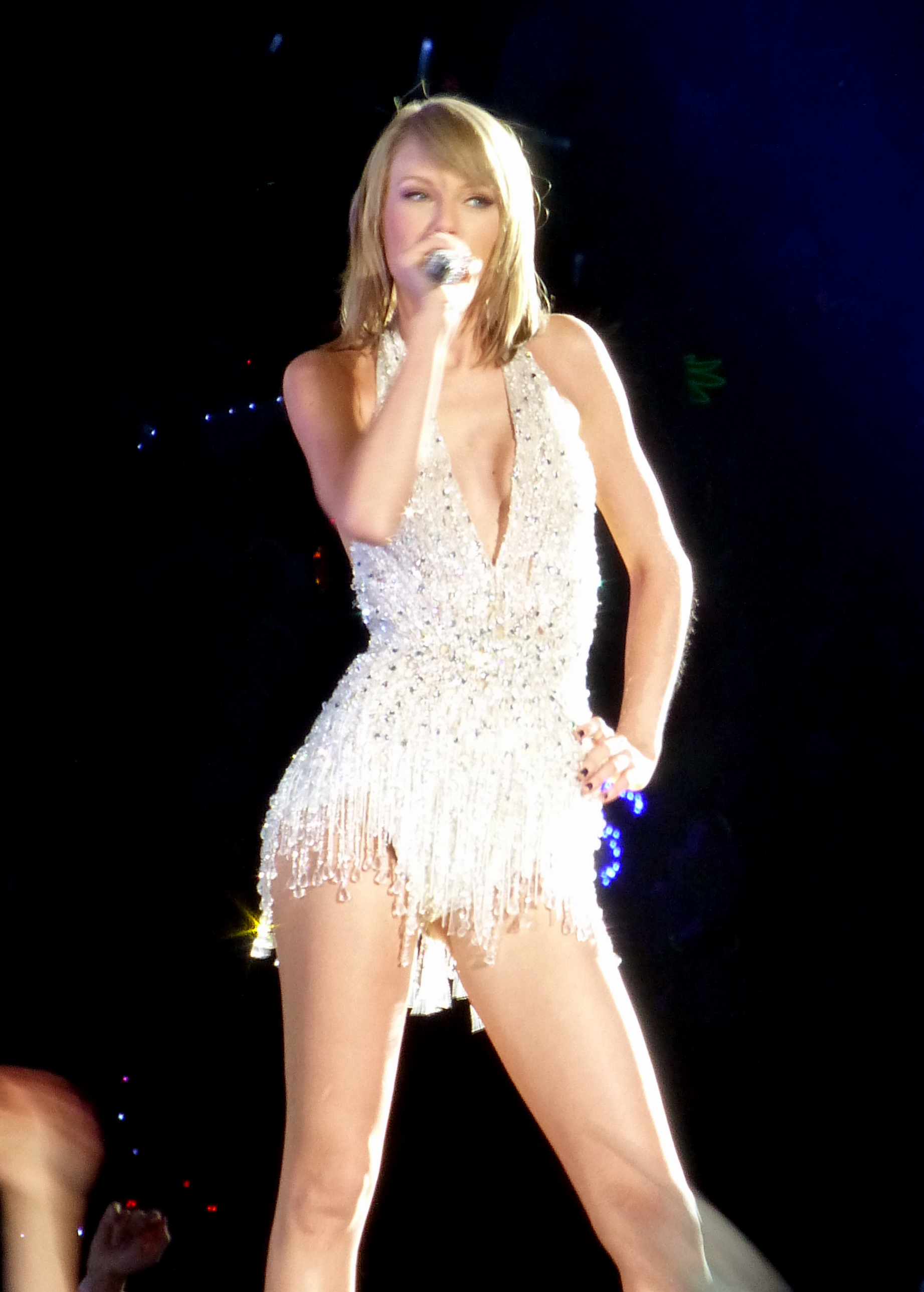
Taylor Swift had three number ones in 2015.

Adult Contemporary is a chart published by Billboard ranking the top-performing songs in the United States in the adult contemporary music (AC) market. In 2015, nine different songs topped the chart in 52 issues of the magazine, based on weekly airplay data from radio stations compiled by Nielsen Broadcast Data Systems.

On the first chart of the year, the number one position was held by Idina Menzel and Michael Bublé with their version of the 1940s song "Baby, It's Cold Outside", the song's third consecutive week at number one. The following week it was displaced by "Shake It Off" by Taylor Swift, which spent five consecutive weeks at number one. After one week off the top spot, Swift returned to number one with the song "Blank Space". She would go on to achieve a third chart-topper in the summer with "Style", and was the only act with more than one AC number one in 2015. Both "Shake It Off" and "Blank Space" also topped Billboard's all-genre chart, the Hot 100.

Following Swift's second chart-topper of the year, British singer Ed Sheeran gained his first AC number one with "Thinking Out Loud", which spent 19 non-consecutive weeks in the top spot. This meant that Sheeran achieved three feats: the longest unbroken run at number one during 2015, the highest total weeks at number one by a song, and the highest total weeks at number one by an artist. The final number one of the year was "Hello" by another British singer, Adele, which reached the peak position in the issue of Billboard dated November 28. The first track to be made available from her eagerly-anticipated third album 25, "Hello" sold a record number of downloads in its first week of release. The song was the first track for 13 years to break into the top 5 of the traditionally slow-moving AC chart inside three weeks, and reached number one in its fourth week on the chart. In contrast, "Maps" by the group Maroon 5, released the previous summer, had taken more than seven months to finally reach the summit of the chart in February. Adele's song remained at number one for the final five weeks of 2015.

== Chart history ==
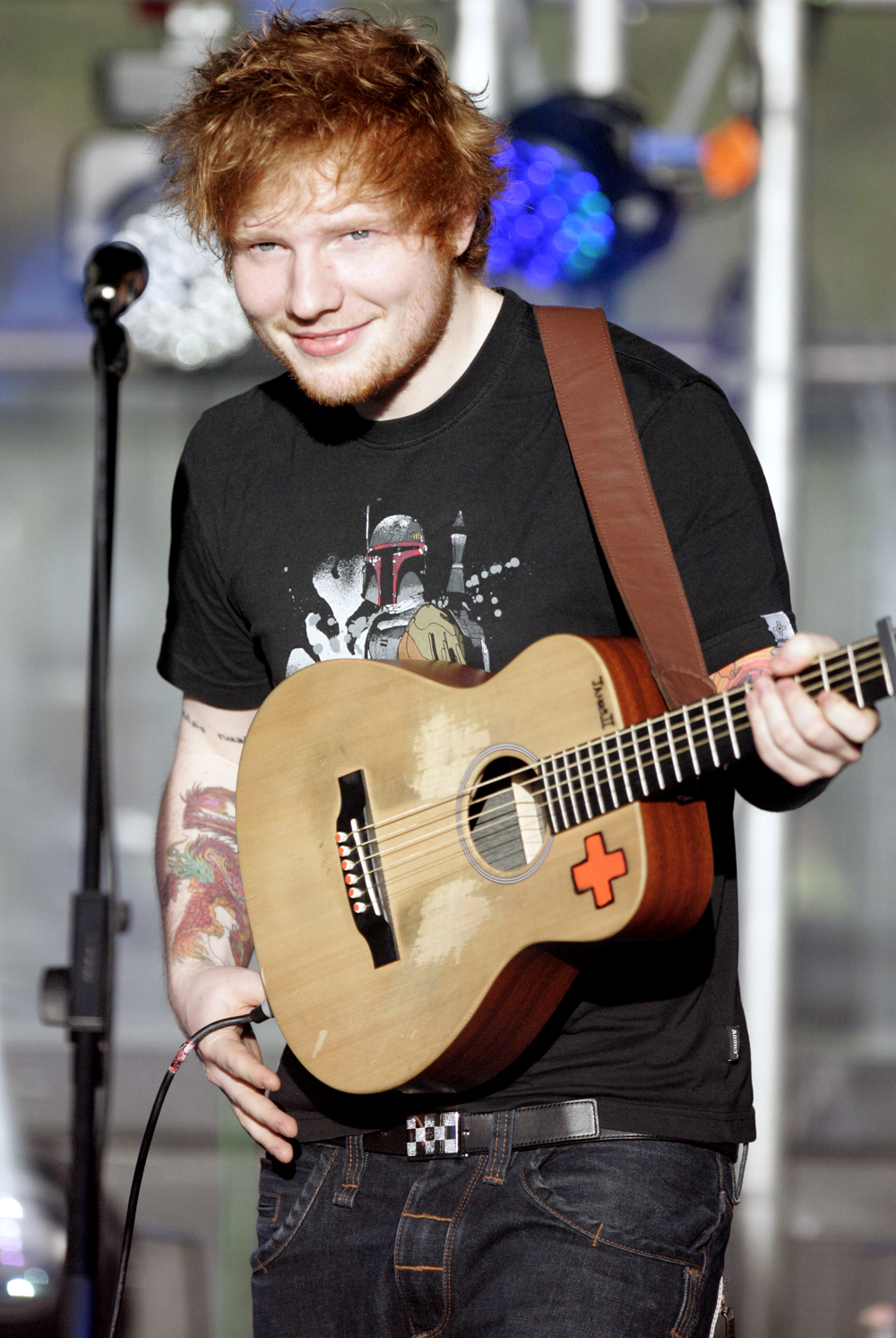
"Thinking Out Loud" was the first AC number one for Ed Sheeran.

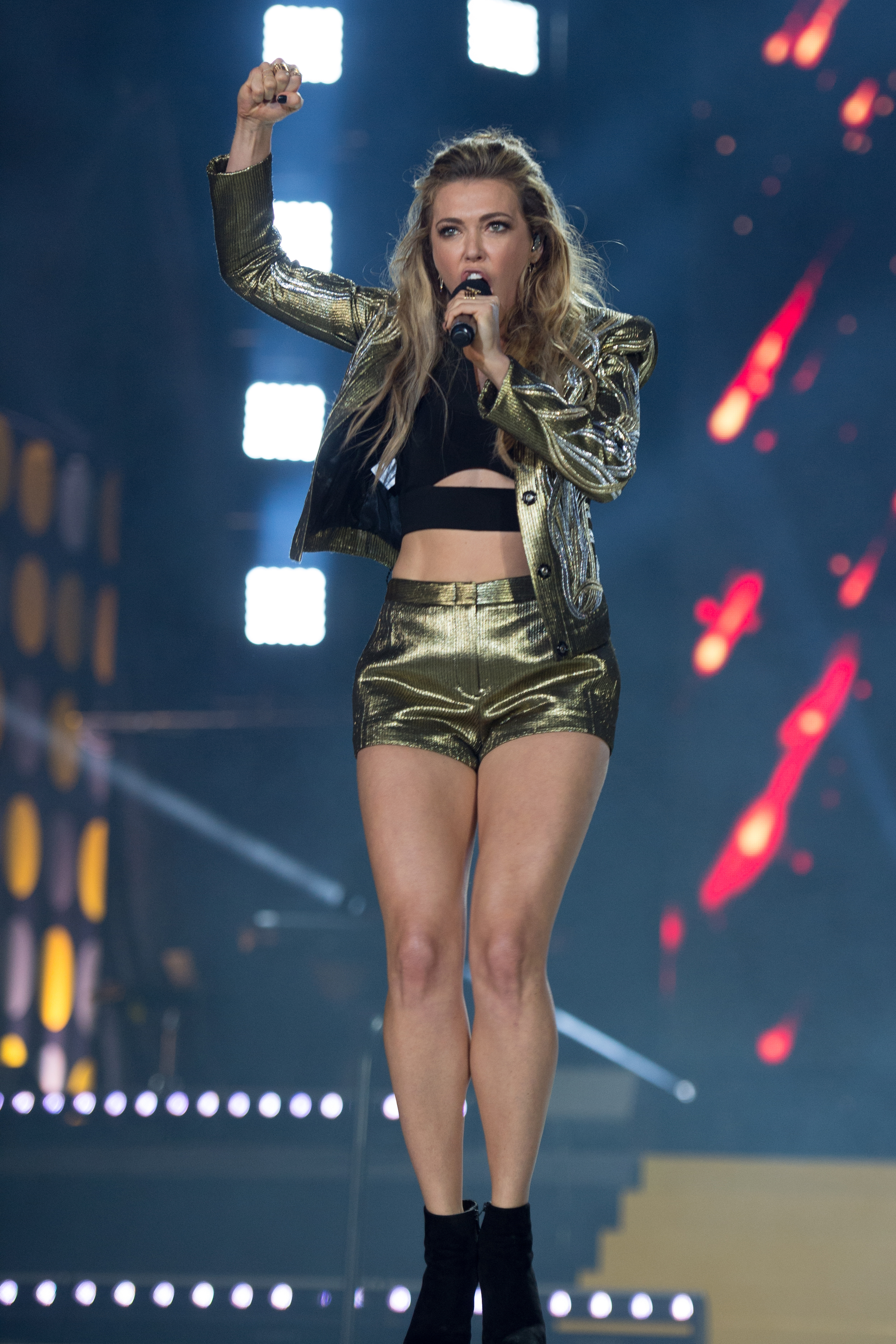
Rachel Platten topped the chart with "Fight Song".

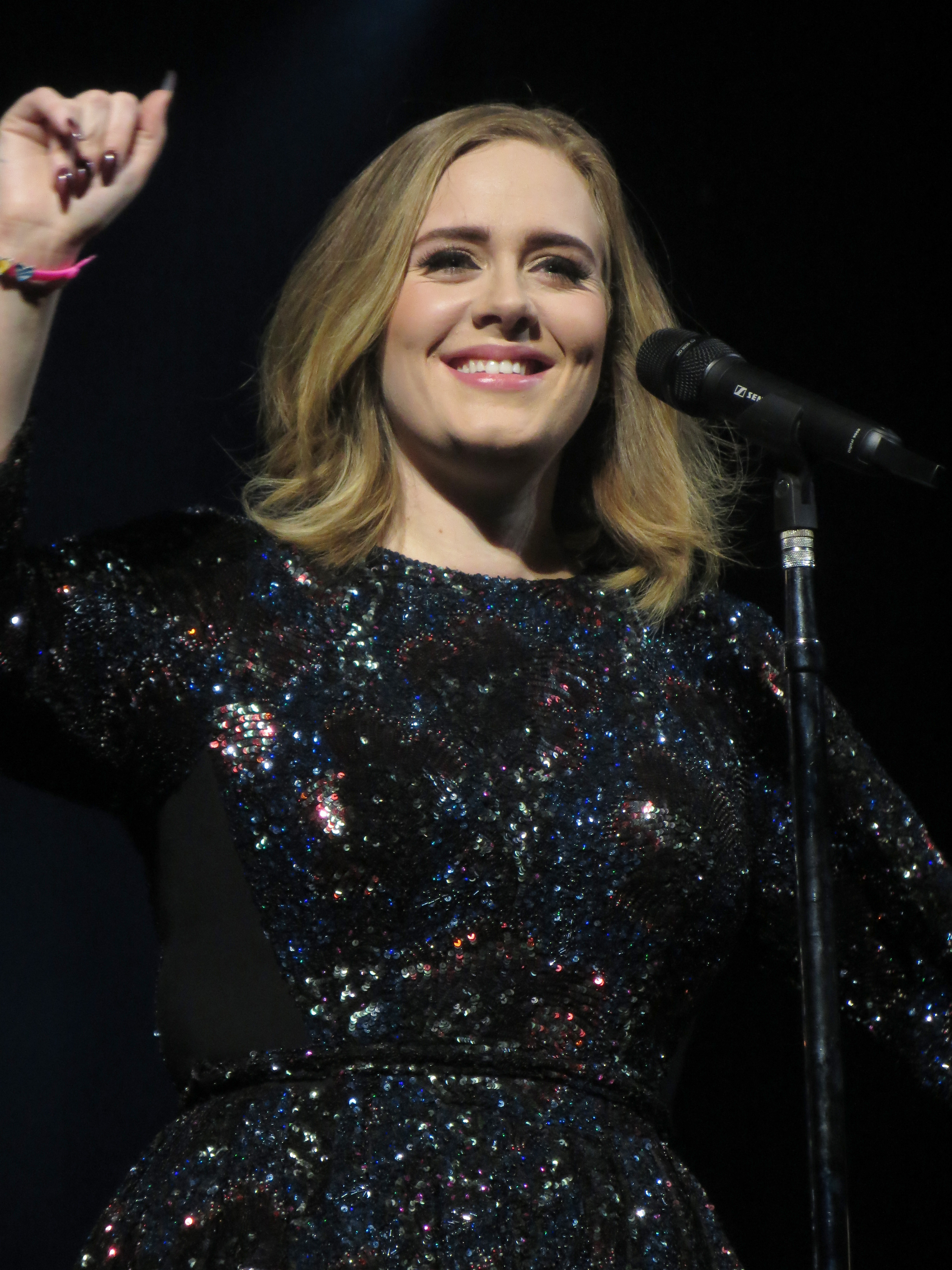
Adele was at number one for the final five weeks of the year.

Key
†	Indicates best-performing AC song of 2015

Issue date	Title	Artist(s)	Ref.
January 3	"Baby, It's Cold Outside"	Idina Menzel and Michael Bublé	
January 10	"Shake It Off"	Taylor Swift	
January 17	"Shake It Off"	Taylor Swift	
January 24	"Shake It Off"	Taylor Swift	
January 31	"Shake It Off"	Taylor Swift	
February 7	"Shake It Off"	Taylor Swift	
February 14	"Maps"	Maroon 5	
February 21	"Blank Space"	Taylor Swift	
February 28	"Blank Space"	Taylor Swift	
March 7	"Blank Space"	Taylor Swift	
March 14	"Blank Space"	Taylor Swift	
March 21	"Thinking Out Loud" †	Ed Sheeran	
March 28	"Thinking Out Loud" †	Ed Sheeran	
April 4	"Thinking Out Loud" †	Ed Sheeran	
April 11	"Thinking Out Loud" †	Ed Sheeran	
April 18	"Thinking Out Loud" †	Ed Sheeran	
April 25	"Thinking Out Loud" †	Ed Sheeran	
May 2	"Thinking Out Loud" †	Ed Sheeran	
May 9	"Thinking Out Loud" †	Ed Sheeran	
May 16	"Thinking Out Loud" †	Ed Sheeran	
May 23	"Thinking Out Loud" †	Ed Sheeran	
May 30	"Thinking Out Loud" †	Ed Sheeran	
June 6	"Thinking Out Loud" †	Ed Sheeran	
June 13	"Thinking Out Loud" †	Ed Sheeran	
June 20	"Thinking Out Loud" †	Ed Sheeran	
June 27	"Thinking Out Loud" †	Ed Sheeran	
July 4	"Thinking Out Loud" †	Ed Sheeran	
July 11	"Style"	Taylor Swift	
July 18	"Style"	Taylor Swift	
July 25	"Thinking Out Loud" †	Ed Sheeran	
August 1	"Thinking Out Loud" †	Ed Sheeran	
August 8	"Thinking Out Loud" †	Ed Sheeran	
August 15	"Shut Up and Dance"	Walk the Moon	
August 22	"Shut Up and Dance"	Walk the Moon	
August 29	"Shut Up and Dance"	Walk the Moon	
September 5	"Shut Up and Dance"	Walk the Moon	
September 12	"Shut Up and Dance"	Walk the Moon	
September 19	"Shut Up and Dance"	Walk the Moon	
September 26	"Fight Song"	Rachel Platten	
October 3	"Fight Song"	Rachel Platten	
October 10	"Fight Song"	Rachel Platten	
October 17	"Fight Song"	Rachel Platten	
October 24	"Fight Song"	Rachel Platten	
October 31	"Fight Song"	Rachel Platten	
November 7	"Fight Song"	Rachel Platten	
November 14	"Fight Song"	Rachel Platten	
November 21	"Fight Song"	Rachel Platten	
November 28	"Hello"	Adele	
December 5	"Hello"	Adele	
December 12	"Hello"	Adele	
December 19	"Hello"	Adele	
December 26	"Hello"	Adele	

== See also ==
- 2015 in American music
