= List of number-one singles of 2015 (South Africa) =

The South African Airplay Chart ranks the best-performing singles in South Africa. Its data, published by Entertainment Monitoring Africa, is based collectively on each single's weekly airplay.

== List of number-one singles of 2015 ==
Date	Song	Artist(s)	Ref.
6 January	"Trip to Cairo"	Dlala MJ	
13 January	"Trip to Cairo"	Dlala MJ	
20 January	"Blank Space"	Taylor Swift	
27 January	"Risky"	Litty Gvng	
3 February	"Uptown Funk"	Mark Ronson featuring Bruno Mars	
10 February	"Uptown Funk"	Mark Ronson featuring Bruno Mars	
17 February	"Uptown Funk"	Mark Ronson featuring Bruno Mars	
24 February	"Thinking Out Loud"	Ed Sheeran	
3 March	"Thinking Out Loud"	Ed Sheeran	
10 March	"Love Me like You Do"	Ellie Goulding	
17 March	"Love Me like You Do"	Ellie Goulding	
24 March	"Love Me like You Do"	Ellie Goulding	
31 March	"Sugar"	Maroon 5	
7 April	"Love Me like You Do"	Ellie Goulding	
14 April	"Love Me like You Do"	Ellie Goulding	
21 April	"Sugar"	Maroon 5	
28 April	"Style"	Taylor Swift	
5 May	"Style"	Taylor Swift	
19 May	"Want to Want Me"	Jason Derulo	
26 May	"See You Again"	Wiz Khalifa featuring Charlie Puth	
2 June	"Want to Want Me"	Jason Derulo	
9 June	"See You Again"	Wiz Khalifa featuring Charlie Puth	
16 June	"See You Again"	Wiz Khalifa featuring Charlie Puth	
23 June	"See You Again"	Wiz Khalifa featuring Charlie Puth	
30 June	"See You Again"	Wiz Khalifa featuring Charlie Puth	
7 July	"Shumaya"	Dbn Nyts featuring Zinhle Ngidi and Trade Mark	
14 July	"Cheerleader"	OMI	
21 July	"Shumaya"	Dbn Nyts featuring Zinhle Ngidi and Trade Mark	
28 July	"Shumaya"	Dbn Nyts featuring Zinhle Ngidi and Trade Mark	
4 August	"Cheerleader"	OMI	
11 August	"Can't Feel My Face"	The Weeknd	
18 August	"Cheerleader"	OMI	
25 August	"Can't Feel My Face"	The Weeknd	
1 September	"Can't Feel My Face"	The Weeknd	
8 September	"Can't Feel My Face"	The Weeknd	
15 September	"Can't Feel My Face"	The Weeknd	
22 September	"Can't Feel My Face"	The Weeknd	
29 September	"What Do You Mean?"	Justin Bieber	
6 October	"We Dance Again"	Black Coffee featuring Nakhane Toure	
13 October	"We Dance Again"	Black Coffee featuring Nakhane Toure	
20 October	"We Dance Again"	Black Coffee featuring Nakhane Toure	
27 October	"What Do You Mean?"	Justin Bieber	
3 November	"We Dance Again"	Black Coffee featuring Nakhane Toure	
10 November	"Hello"	Adele	
17 November	"Hello"	Adele	
24 November	"Hello"	Adele	
1 December	"Hello"	Adele	
8 December	"Hello"	Adele	
15 December	"Hello"	Adele	
22 December	"Hello"	Adele	
29 December	"Hello"	Adele	

== Number-one artists ==
Position	Artist	Weeks at No. 1
1	Adele	8
2	The Weeknd	6
3	Ellie Goulding	5
3	Wiz Khalifa	5
3	Charlie Puth	5
4	Black Coffee	4
4	Nakhane Toure	4
5	Mark Ronson	3
5	Bruno Mars	3
5	Ed Sheeran	3
5	Taylor Swift	3
5	Dbn Nyts	3
5	Zinhle Ngidi	3
5	Trade Mark	3
5	OMI	3
6	DJ Merlon	2
6	Mondli Ngcobo	2
6	Jason Derulo	2
6	Maroon 5	2
6	Justin Bieber	2
7	Litty Gvng	1

== See also ==
- 2015 in music
- Entertainment Monitoring Africa
