= 1989 (Ryan Adams album) =

2015 studio album by Ryan Adams

Studio album by Ryan Adams
- Released: September 21, 2015
- Studios: Pax-Am, Los Angeles
- Genres: Alternative country; rock
- Length: 54:18
- Label: PAX AM
- Producers: Ryan Adams; Charlie Stavish

Ryan Adams chronology
Ryan Adams (2014)	1989 (2015)	Prisoner (2017)

Singles from 1989
- 1. "Bad Blood" Released: September 3, 2015

1989 is the fifteenth studio album by American singer-songwriter Ryan Adams, released digitally through his own PAX AM record label on September 21, 2015. The album is a track-by-track cover of American singer-songwriter Taylor Swift's album of the same name, comprising all thirteen songs from the original album's standard track listing. It debuted at number 7 on the US Billboard 200, one position ahead of Swift's own 1989, which was in its 48th week on the chart.

== Background ==
Adams first became interested in Taylor Swift's album while coping with the collapse of his marriage to Mandy Moore. On what attracted him about Swift's album, Adams stated "There's just a joy to 1989," describing the album as "its own alternate universe". Adams initially described the album as being in the style of the Smiths. When recording the album, Adams said he found a sound somewhere between Bruce Springsteen's Darkness on the Edge of Town (1978) and the Smiths' Meat Is Murder (1985).

=== Taylor Swift's response ===
On the day that Adams announced the project, Swift responded enthusiastically from her Twitter account, writing, "Cool I'm not gonna be able to sleep tonight or ever again and I'm going to celebrate today every year as a holiday".

Two weeks later, an official statement was released via Entertainment Weekly, whereupon Swift expressed further excitement and anticipation:

"Ryan Adams is one of the artists who shaped my songwriting. My favorite part of his style of creating music is his ability to bleed aching vulnerability into it, and that's what he's done with his cover project of my album 1989. When I first heard that Ryan was going to be covering my entire album, I couldn't believe it. It's such an honor that he would want to take my stories and lyrics and give them a new life. He's gotten some of the best musicians together to record this album and if the clips he's released are any indication, this is going to be something really special".

— Taylor Swift, August 20, 2015

On September 21, a day after the album's release, Adams was on Zane Lowe's Beats 1 radio show when Swift made a surprise appearance. Swift praised Adams' work, and described the ways in which his interpretation of the songs differed from her own. She stated that they were "not cover songs" but rather "reimaginings of my songs, and you can tell that he was in a very different place emotionally when he put his spin on them than I was when I wrote them. There's this beautiful aching sadness and longing in this album that doesn't exist in the original". In the same interview, Swift also admitted that, after spending time listening to an advance copy of Adams' album, she had picked up some of Adams' melodies when performing her songs on tour.

== Critical reception ==
Professional ratings
Aggregate scores
Source	Rating
AnyDecentMusic?	6.6/10
Metacritic	69/100
Review scores
Source	Rating
AllMusic	3/5 stars
American Songwriter	4/5 stars
The A.V. Club	A−
The Boston Globe	Positive
Entertainment Weekly	A−
Los Angeles Times	Positive
Pitchfork	4/10
Slant Magazine	3/5 stars
Sputnikmusic	3.9/5
The Telegraph	5/5 stars

Adams's interpretation of 1989 received mostly positive feedback from music critics. At Metacritic, which assigns a weighted average rating out of 100 from selected independent ratings and reviews from mainstream critics, the album received a metascore of 69 out of 100, based on 25 reviews, indicating "generally favorable reviews".

Entertainment Weekly's Leah Greenblatt praised the album, commenting "If turning the biggest, shiniest pop record of the past year into a survey course in classic rock economy sounds like a novelty, it is. But it's also the best kind – one that brings two divergent artists together in smart, unexpected ways, and somehow manages to reveal the best of both of them". Jim Beviglia of American Songwriter also complimented the album, stating, "It is 1989 reimagined, with often startling results". On a similar note, The A.V. Club's Annie Zaleski said of the album in her review: "What his version of 1989 does best is illustrate the strength of the source material. With the radio-ready gloss stripped away, these songs compare to the best moments in Swift's back catalog".

Jon Caramanica of The New York Times, however, called the album, "a love letter from an indie idol to a pop queen," and considered Adams "not built for the songs". In a similarly negative review, Mark Richardson of Pitchfork declared, "Adams has transformed [1989] into ... a run-of-the-mill Ryan Adams album". Robert Christgau, writing for Vice, named "This Love" and "I Know Places" as highlights and summed up Adams' cover album with, "Chivalrous Nashville fellow traveler proves the superiority of younger fellow traveler by failing to top much less reinvent a single performance on her breakaway album, which he covers front-to-back like the gifted fanboy I guess he must be".

=== Accolades ===
Publication	Rank	List
Diffuser	8	The 50 Best Albums of 2015
Entertainment Weekly	40	The 40 Best Albums of 2015
NME	50	NME's Albums of the Year 2015
Paste	40	The 50 Best Albums of 2015
Rough Trade	99	Albums of the Year 2015
Huffington Post	8	Albums of the Year 2015

== Commercial performance ==
The album debuted at number seven on the US Billboard 200, earning 56,000 equivalent album units sales in its first week.

== Track listing ==
All tracks are produced by Ryan Adams and Charlie Stavish.

No.	Title	Writer(s)	Length
1.	"Welcome to New York"	Taylor Swift; Ryan Tedder	3:18
2.	"Blank Space"	Swift; Max Martin; Shellback	3:21
3.	"Style"	Swift; Martin; Shellback; Ali Payami	2:44
4.	"Out of the Woods"	Swift; Jack Antonoff	6:09
5.	"All You Had to Do Was Stay"	Swift; Martin	3:30
6.	"Shake It Off"	Swift; Martin; Shellback	4:06
7.	"I Wish You Would"	Swift; Antonoff	3:44
8.	"Bad Blood"	Swift; Martin; Shellback	3:55
9.	"Wildest Dreams"	Swift; Martin; Shellback	5:21
10.	"How You Get the Girl"	Swift; Martin; Shellback	3:50
11.	"This Love"	Swift	4:45
12.	"I Know Places"	Swift; Tedder	5:14
13.	"Clean"	Swift; Imogen Heap	4:23
Total length:			54:18

== Personnel ==
Credits are adapted from liner notes of 1989.

Musicians

- Ryan Adams – vocals, guitars, synthesizer, pump organ, piano, trash can, producer
- Taylor Swift – songwriter, original performer
- Stephen Patt – double bass, pedal steel guitar
- The Section Quartet – strings
- Charlie Stavish – bass guitar, synthesizer, producer
- Nate Walcott – piano, organ, pump organ, synthesizer
- Tod Wisenbaker – guitars

Technical

- Andy West Design – design
- Julia Brokaw – band photographs
- Gavin Lurssen – mastering
- Charlie Stavish – engineer, mixing

== Charts ==
=== Weekly charts ===
Chart (2015)	Peak position
Australian Albums (ARIA)	9
Belgian Albums (Ultratop Flanders)	9
Canadian Albums (Billboard)	9
Dutch Albums (Album Top 100)	21
Finnish Albums (Suomen virallinen lista)	28
Irish Albums (IRMA)	15
New Zealand Albums (RMNZ)	18
Norwegian Albums (VG-lista)	21
Spanish Albums (Promusicae)	78
Swedish Albums (Sverigetopplistan)	38
Swiss Albums (Schweizer Hitparade)	58
UK Albums (Official Charts)	2
US Billboard 200	7
US Americana/Folk Albums (Billboard)	1
US Top Rock Albums (Billboard)	3
US Vinyl Albums (Billboard)	2

=== Year-end charts ===
Chart (2016)	Position
Belgian Albums (Ultratop Flanders)	192

== Release history ==
Date	Region	Format(s)	Label	Ref.
September 21, 2015	United States	Digital download; streaming	PAX AM	
November 6, 2015	United States	CD	PAX AM	
December 11, 2015	United States	Vinyl; cassette	PAX AM	
