= Style (Taylor Swift song) =

2015 single by Taylor Swift

Single by Taylor Swift

from the album 1989
- Released: February 9, 2015
- Studio: MXM (Stockholm); Conway Recording (Los Angeles)
- Genre: Synth-pop; funk-pop; Italo disco; pop rock
- Length: 3:51
- Label: Big Machine
- Songwriters: Taylor Swift; Max Martin; Shellback; Ali Payami
- Producers: Max Martin; Shellback; Ali Payami

Taylor Swift singles chronology
"Blank Space" (2014)	"Style" (2015)	"Bad Blood" (2015)

Music video
- "Style" on YouTube

"Style" is a song by the American singer-songwriter Taylor Swift and the third single from her fifth studio album, 1989 (2014). Swift wrote the track with its producers Max Martin, Shellback, and Ali Payami. An incorporation of pop, funk, disco, and electronic styles, "Style" is built on an electric guitar riff, pulsing synthesizers, and dense vocal reverb. The lyrics are about a couple who could not escape from an unhealthy relationship because they are never "out of style". Big Machine in partnership with Republic Records released the song to US radio on February 9, 2015.

In the United States, "Style" peaked at number 6 and was 1989's third consecutive top-ten single on the Billboard Hot 100, and it has been certified triple platinum by the Recording Industry Association of America. The single reached number one in South Africa and the top 10 in Australia, Canada, and Scotland. It has been certified multi-platinum in Australia, Brazil, Canada, New Zealand, and the United Kingdom. Early reviews were generally positive and praised the production but a few of them deemed the lyrics unsophisticated. Retrospective opinions have regarded "Style" as one of Swift's best songs, and one of the best pop songs in recent history.

Kyle Newman directed the song's music video, which premiered on February 13, 2015. It features Swift and Dominic Sherwood as a couple who reminisce about their relationship through illusions and flashbacks using broken mirror pieces. Swift included "Style" on the set lists for three of her world tours: the 1989 World Tour (2015), the Reputation Stadium Tour (2018), and the Eras Tour (2023–2024). Following a 2019 dispute regarding the ownership of Swift's back catalog, she re-recorded the song as "Style (Taylor's Version)" for her re-recorded album 1989 (Taylor's Version) (2023).

== Background and production ==
Taylor Swift had identified as a country musician, up until her fourth studio album, Red, which was released on October 22, 2012. Red incorporates eclectic pop and rock styles beyond the country stylings of Swift's past albums, which led to critics questioning her country-music identity. Swift began writing songs for her fifth studio album in mid-2013 while touring on the Red Tour. Inspired by 1980s synth-pop, she named the album 1989 after her birth year to signify an artistic reinvention: she described it as her first "official pop album". In 1989, Swift and the Swedish producer Max Martin served as executive producers. Out of 13 tracks on the standard edition, Martin and his frequent collaborator Shellback produced seven, including "Style".

According to the liner notes of 1989, Swift wrote some of the first lyrics to "Style" in February 2014. The producer Ali Payami and the guitarist Niklas Ljungfelt composed the instrumental of "Style", a guitar-driven track inspired by Daft Punk and what Ljungfelt described as "funky electronic music". Payami played the track to Martin, which Swift overheard and led to her becoming fond of the track. She and Martin wrote new lyrics to the instrumental, and Shellback and Payami co-wrote the track. Martin, Shellback, and Payami produced "Style", which was recorded by Michael Illbert and Sam Holland, assisted by Cory Bice, at MXM Studios in Stockholm and Conway Recording Studios in Los Angeles. The song was mixed by Serban Ghenea and John Hanes at MixStar Studios in Virginia Beach, and it was mastered by Tom Coyne at Sterling Sound in New York City. "Style" was the last song produced for 1989; Swift said that once she finished the track, she knew the album was complete: "There was a huge missing piece, and that song filled it."

== Music and lyrics ==
"Style" (Karaoke Version)
"Style" incorporates synth-pop, pop rock, funk, and disco styles. Driven by pulsing synthesizers, the track features an electric guitar riff and a disco-tinged groove.

"Style" features prominent electronic stylings. It incorporates pulsing synthesizers, a throbbing bassline, and dense vocal reverb. The track exhibits eclectic influences: it is built on a recurring electric guitar riff that aligns with funk, R&B, and 1980s rock, and its upbeat groove evokes dance and 1970s disco. The refrain's first half consists of major chords of D and G that create a radiant atmosphere; the second half switches to a B minor chord that creates a rather sorrow one.

Critics mostly categorize "Style" as synth-pop and funk-pop. Other reviews deem it Italo disco and pop rock. Ed Masley in The Arizona Republic and the musicologist James E. Perone regard it as a hybrid of disco and new wave, while Alex Hudson and Megan LaPierre from Exclaim! say that it has a "synthwave atmosphere". According to many critics, "Style" not only resembles the music of the 1980s but also features a modern-leaning production. They liken the sound to the works of 1980s musicians such as Chaka Khan, Nile Rodgers, Don Henley, and Madonna, or contemporary acts such as Daft Punk, Electric Youth, and Blood Orange. Masley writes that the track "would have sounded right at home on MTV a few years earlier than 1989", and Rob Sheffield of Rolling Stone deems it "extremely 1986-sounding". For Perone, although "Style" strongly evokes 1980s music, it does not reference any particular influence.

Swift was inspired to write "Style" by an unstable relationship which she compared to timeless fashion staples. The lyrics are about an on-again, off-again relationship, and the couple in question could not end it because they are never "out of style". The opening lines set a scene, "Midnight/ You come and pick me up, no headlights"; for some critics, these lyrics allude to sex, a theme Swift had not openly embraced—Jon Caramanica of The New York Times cited them as an example of her relinquishing the youthful innocence of her past songs. The refrain depicts the couple as conventionally attractive: the male lover resembles the 1950s actor James Dean with his "daydream look in [his] eye", and the female narrator flaunts her "red lip classic thing that you like" and "good girl faith and a tight little skirt". For some journalists, the beauty depicted is conservative and embedded with racial undertones. In the second pre-chorus, both characters mutually admit to cheating; Swift said the part displayed her evolved viewpoints on past relationships by admitting wrongdoings of both sides instead of her "I was right, you were wrong" mindset in previous songs.

I say, "I heard that you've been out and about with some other girl"
He says, "What you've heard is true, but I,
Can't stop thinking about you and I"
I said, "I've been there too a few times"

== Release and commercial performance ==
A snippet of "Style" premiered in a Target commercial for 1989 on October 22, 2014. Big Machine Records released 1989 on October 27, 2014; "Style" is number three on the standard track listing. Big Machine in partnership with Republic Records released the song to US hot adult contemporary radio on February 9, and to US contemporary hit and rhythmic contemporary radio on February 10, 2015; it was the third single from 1989. In Italy, Universal Music released "Style" to radio on April 3, 2015.

"Style" debuted at number 60 on the US Billboard Hot 100 chart dated November 15, 2014, and peaked at number six on March 21, 2015; it was 1989's third consecutive top-10 single after the chart toppers "Shake It Off" and "Blank Space". On Billboard's airplay charts, the single peaked atop Pop Songs, Adult Pop Songs, and Adult Contemporary. It was the seventh-best-performing song on US airplay of 2015, earning 3.163 billion audience impressions from 550,000 plays. The single has been certified triple platinum by the Recording Industry Association of America for surpassing three million units based on sales and streams. By November 2017, "Style" had sold 2.2 million downloads in the United States.

The single peaked atop the South African chart and in the top 20 on charts in the Czech Republic (11), Poland (13), Slovakia (14), and Hungary (18). In the English-speaking countries, "Style" peaked at number six in Canada, number eight in Australia, number nine in Scotland, and number 11 in the United Kingdom and New Zealand; it has been certified multi-platinum in all said countries: triple platinum in Canada, New Zealand, and the United Kingdom, and ten-times platinum in Australia.

After Swift embarked on her sixth headlining world tour, the Eras Tour, in March 2023, sales and streams of her discography resurged. "Style" peaked at number 41 on the Billboard Global 200 chart dated August 26, 2023. It appeared on new singles charts of Italy (peaking at number 80), Vietnam (number 37), the Philippines (number 15), Portugal (number 14), and Singapore (number 2).

== Critical reception ==
In reviews of 1989, many critics regarded "Style" as an album highlight, including Caramanica, Mikael Wood of the Los Angeles Times, Benjamin Boles of Now, and Joey Guerra of the Houston Chronicle. The production received praise: Kitty Empire from The Observer called it a "percolating" song that "satisfies on every level", Paul Nolan from Hot Press deemed it a "brilliantly executed" song with an "infectious" and "irresistible" production, and PopMatters's Corey Beasley described the track as "immaculate". In Vulture, Lindsay Zoladz commented that "Style" showcased Swift as an artist who made pop music "bend to her will". The song placed 24th on the 2015 Pazz & Jop poll, an annual mass critics' poll conducted by The Village Voice. At the 2016 BMI Awards, "Style" was one of the Award-Winning Songs that earned Swift the honor of Songwriter of the Year. It received a nomination for International Work of the Year at the APRA Music Awards of 2016.

Reception of the lyrics was not as uniformly positive. Caramanica and Robert Leedham of Drowned in Sound opined that "Style" embodied Swift's adult viewpoint on romance; the former said it depicted her as "savage, wry, and pointed", and the latter applauded the song for celebrating "being young and reckless [as] a part of growing up". Pitchfork ranked the song 50th on their list of 2014's best songs; Jordan Sargent opined that the lyrics were not groundbreaking but the production and Swift's "tense and restrained" vocals represented her artistic reinvention. The Independent's Andy Gill said although the song had a "certain piquancy", it also contained "desperately inclusive electropop grooves and corporate rebel clichés". Consequence of Sound's Sasha Geffen said the song had one of the album's catchiest hooks but criticized its lyrics mentioning "conventionally pretty white people" as a cliché that blemished Swift's "girl-next-door likability".

Critics have retrospectively considered "Style" one of Swift's best songs. According to Annie Zaleski, the track is one of Swift's "most beloved" songs. She lauded its "disco-funk vibe" for evoking a sentiment similar to "the ecstatic feeling of speeding down the highway in a convertible" and the dynamic chorus that sounds like "a confident catwalk strut". American Songwriter's Alex Hopper wrote that the single was "arguably the blueprint for pop music in the mid-2010s", and Billboard's Kristen He said that it displayed "Swift's songwriting at its purest". In rankings of Swift's entire catalog, the song was placed among her 20 best songs by Billboard's staff, Clash's staff, The Independent's Roisin O'Connor, Paste's Jane Song, and Vulture's Nate Jones, and her 10 best by Exclaim!'s Alex Hudson and Megan LaPierre, The Guardian's Alexis Petridis, NME's Hannah Mylrea, and Variety's Chris Willman.

== Music video ==
The music video of "Style" features silhouettes—seen here is a scene of Swift overlaid on a shot of a similarly shaped cave and her love interest—which critics compared to the opening sequence of True Detective.

Kyle Newman directed the music video for "Style", which was shot in Los Angeles and completed within four days in summer 2014. Before its release, Swift posted several teaser images and short clips from the video on her social media accounts. She planned to premiere the video on Good Morning America on the morning of February 13, 2015, but the Canadian music channel Much released it at midnight. Swift uploaded the video to her Vevo account on the same day. In the video, the English actor Dominic Sherwood plays Swift's love interest. Swift contacted him by text message roughly a month before the shooting; the two had known of each other through mutual friends. By the time they worked on the video, Sherwood had finished the film Take Down, which was later renamed Billionaire Ransom (released in 2016).

The video does not have a clear narrative but features disparate flashbacks of Swift and her love interest by the seashore, in the woods, and on car rides. They are shown via broken glass pieces and a car's rear-view mirror, through which Swift and her lover see each other. Media publications commented that the video for "Style" had a dark, abstract, and sensual atmosphere. Vox's Kelsey McKinney opined that Swift embraced her sexuality using "sensual imagery" of her touching herself, which showcased her maturity as an artist. Emilee Lindner of MTV called the video "mature, tasteful, and ... sexy". Spence Kornhaber from The Atlantic, meanwhile, remarked that Swift expressed her sexuality in a more conservative manner compared to her contemporaries that distinguished her from "the pop obsession with women's bodies".

Several images in the video featuring silhouettes of Swift's head overlaid by other scenes of her lover, the forests, smoking clouds, or thunder storms, were compared to the opening credits of the crime drama series True Detective. The Wall Street Journal's Michael Driscoll said the atmosphere evoked 1980s pop videos, specifically Chris Isaak's "Wicked Game" (1989). Mikael Wood of the Los Angeles Times labelled the visual "a creepy homage" to David Lynch's mystery film Mulholland Drive (2001).

== Live performances and other usage ==
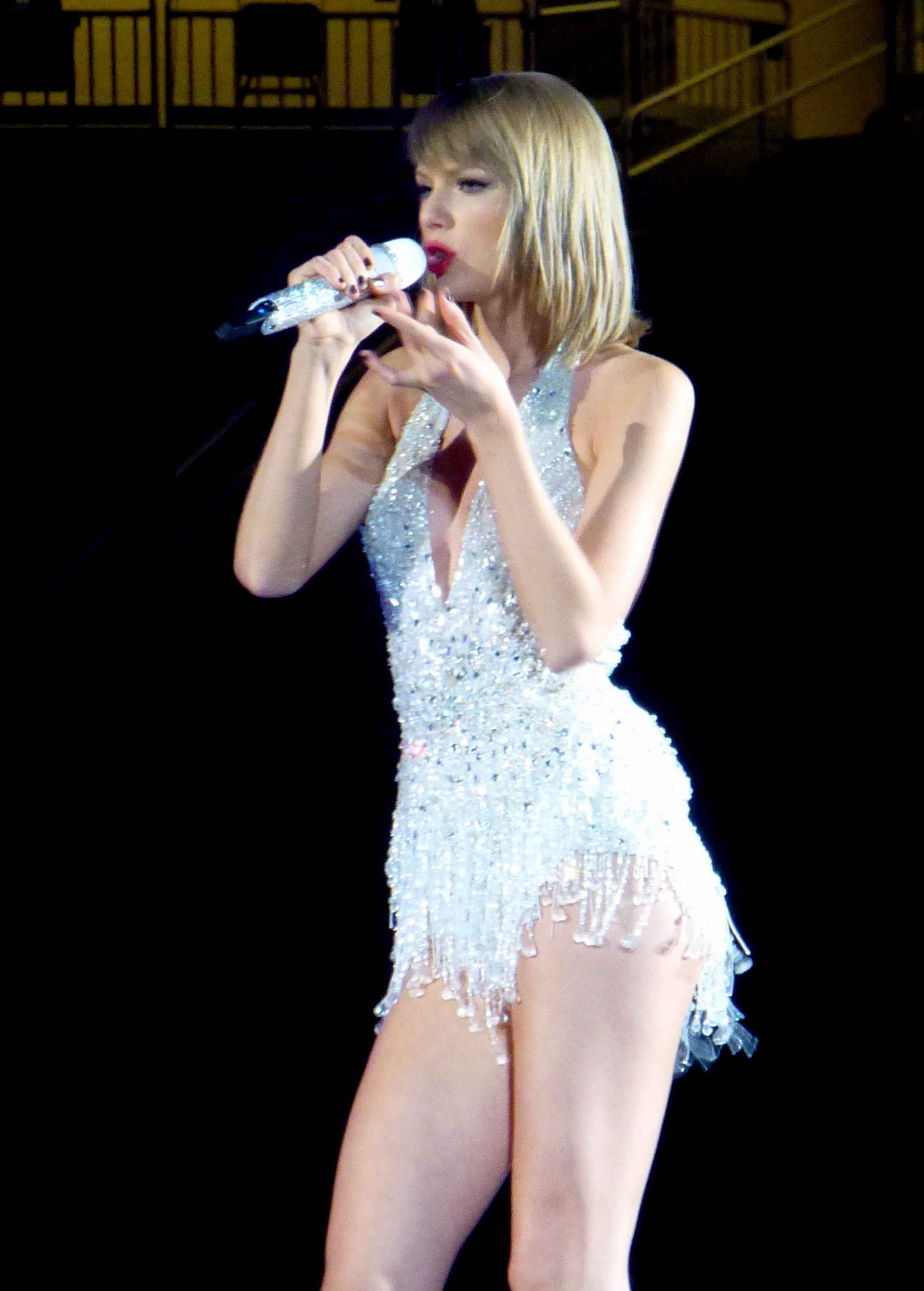
Swift performing "Style" on the 1989 World Tour

Swift first performed "Style" live as part of the "1989 Secret Session", which took place on the rooftop of the Empire State Building and was broadcast live by Yahoo! and iHeartRadio on October 27, 2014. On December 2, she performed the song along with "Blank Space" at the Victoria's Secret Fashion Show 2014 in London. On April 23, 2019, Swift performed an acoustic version of the song at the Lincoln Center for the Performing Arts during the Time 100 Gala, where she was honored as one of the "100 most influential people" of the year. Swift again performed the song on the Wango Tango festival on June 1, during the Amazon Prime Day concert on July 10, and at the City of Lover one-day concert in Paris on September 9, 2019.

"Style" was included on the set list of the 1989 World Tour (2015), which Swift embarked on to promote 1989 worldwide. During the performance of "Style" on several dates, Swift brought special guests onstage with her. Swift also included the song on the set lists for her Reputation Stadium Tour (2018), where it was part of a medley with "Love Story" and "You Belong with Me", and her Eras Tour (2023–2024).

Ryan Adams covered "Style" on his 2015 track-by-track cover album of 1989. He changed the original James Dean-referenced lyric to "You've got that 'Daydream Nation' look in your eye", a tribute to the 1980s rock band Sonic Youth. His version incorporates rock-oriented styles, such as 1980s college rock. Critics compared to sound of the cover version to the music of the band U2 and its lead singer Bono. Zaleski, in a review for The A.V. Club, deemed it a standout on Adams's 1989 for its "yearning, '80s college rock fever dream with snarling punk stabs", but Slant Magazine's Jeremy Winograd called the version "a bad U2 song".

== Credits and personnel ==
Credits are adapted from the liner notes of 1989.

- Taylor Swift – vocals, background vocals, songwriter
- Max Martin – producer, songwriter, keyboard
- Shellback – producer, songwriter, keyboard, programming, additional guitars
- Ali Payami – producer, songwriter, keyboard, programming
- Michael Ilbert – recording
- Niklas Ljungfelt – guitar
- Sam Holland – recording
- Cory Bice – assistant recording
- Serban Ghenea – mixing
- John Hanes – engineered for mix
- Tom Coyne – mastering

== Charts ==
=== Weekly charts ===
2014–2015 weekly chart performance
Chart (2014–2015)	Peak position
Australia (ARIA)	8
Austria (Ö3 Austria Top 40)	28
Belgium (Ultratip Bubbling Under Flanders)	4
Belgium (Ultratip Bubbling Under Wallonia)	6
Brazil (Billboard Hot 100)	98
Canada Hot 100 (Billboard)	6
Canada AC (Billboard)	1
Canada CHR/Top 40 (Billboard)	1
Canada Hot AC (Billboard)	1
Czech Republic Airplay (ČNS IFPI)	11
Euro Digital Song Sales (Billboard)	17
Denmark Airplay (Tracklisten)	3
Finland Airplay (Radiosoittolista)	41
France (SNEP)	85
Germany (GfK)	76
Germany Airplay (BVMI)	19
Hungary (Rádiós Top 40)	31
Hungary (Single Top 40)	18
Ireland (IRMA)	38
Japan Hot 100 (Billboard)	53
Japan Adult Contemporary (Billboard)	11
Mexico (Billboard Mexican Airplay)	40
Mexico Anglo (Monitor Latino)	14
Netherlands (Dutch Top 40)	22
New Zealand (Recorded Music NZ)	11
Poland Airplay (ZPAV)	13
Romania (Airplay 100)	78
Scottish Singles Sales (Official Charts)	9
Slovakia Airplay (ČNS IFPI)	18
Slovenia (SloTop50)	23
South Africa Airplay (EMA)	1
Spain (Promusicae)	47
UK Singles (Official Charts)	21
US Billboard Hot 100	6
US Adult Contemporary (Billboard)	1
US Adult Pop Airplay (Billboard)	1
US Dance Airplay (Billboard)	6
US Dance Club Songs (Billboard)	44
US Pop Airplay (Billboard)	1
US Rhythmic Airplay (Billboard)	21

2023 weekly chart performance
Chart (2023–2025)	Peak position
Austria (Ö3 Austria Top 40)	19
Germany (GfK)	25
Global 200 (Billboard)	41
Greece International (IFPI)	73
Ireland (IRMA)	23
Italy (FIMI)	80
Netherlands (Single Tip)	9
New Zealand Catalogue Singles (RMNZ)	10
Philippines (Billboard)	15
Philippines (Philippines Hot 100)	76
Portugal (AFP)	14
Singapore (RIAS)	2
Sweden Heatseeker (Sverigetopplistan)	8
Switzerland (Schweizer Hitparade)	19
UK Singles (Official Charts)	62
Vietnam (Vietnam Hot 100)	37

=== Year-end charts ===
2015 year-end charts
Chart (2015)	Position
Australia (ARIA)	31
Canada (Canadian Hot 100)	26
US Billboard Hot 100	29
US Adult Contemporary (Billboard)	3
US Adult Pop Songs (Billboard)	8
US Dance/Mix Show Songs (Billboard)	35
US Pop Songs (Billboard)	12

2016 year-end chart
Chart (2016)	Position
US Adult Contemporary (Billboard)	33

2023 year-end chart
Chart (2023)	Position
Global 200 (Billboard)	120

== Certifications ==
Certifications
Region	Certification	Certified units/sales
Australia (ARIA)	10× Platinum	700,000^{‡}
Austria (IFPI Austria)	Platinum	30,000^{*}
Brazil (Pro-Música Brasil)	3× Platinum	180,000^{‡}
Canada (Music Canada)	3× Platinum	240,000^{*}
Denmark (IFPI Danmark)	Platinum	90,000^{‡}
Germany (BVMI)	Gold	300,000^{‡}
Italy (FIMI)	Gold	50,000^{‡}
New Zealand (RMNZ)	4× Platinum	120,000^{‡}
Norway (IFPI Norway)	Gold	30,000^{‡}
Portugal (AFP)	Platinum	20,000^{‡}
Spain (Promusicae)	Gold	30,000^{‡}
United Kingdom (BPI)	3× Platinum	1,800,000^{‡}
United States (RIAA)	3× Platinum	3,000,000^{‡}
Streaming
Greece (IFPI Greece)	Gold	1,000,000^{†}
^{*} Sales figures based on certification alone.^{‡} Sales+streaming figures based on certification alone.^{†} Streaming-only figures based on certification alone.

== Release history ==
Release dates and formats
Region	Date	Format	Label(s)	Ref.
United States	February 9, 2015	Hot adult contemporary	Big Machine; Republic	
United States	February 10, 2015	Contemporary hit radio	Big Machine; Republic	
United States	February 10, 2015	Rhythmic radio	Big Machine; Republic	
Italy	April 3, 2015	Radio airplay	Big Machine; Universal	

== "Style (Taylor's Version)" ==
"Style (Taylor's Version)"

Song by Taylor Swift

from the album 1989 (Taylor's Version)
- Released: October 27, 2023
- Studio: Prime Recording (Nashville)
- Length: 3:51
- Label: Republic
- Songwriters: Taylor Swift; Max Martin; Shellback; Ali Payami
- Producers: Taylor Swift; Christopher Rowe

Lyric video
- "Style (Taylor's Version)" on YouTube

Swift ended her contract with Big Machine and signed with Republic Records in 2018. She began re-recording her first six studio albums in November 2020. The decision followed a public dispute in 2019 between Swift and the talent manager Scooter Braun, who acquired Big Machine including the masters of Swift's albums which the label had released. By re-recording the albums, Swift had full ownership of the new masters, which enabled her to control the licensing of her songs for commercial use and therefore substituted the Big Machine–owned masters.

The re-recording of "Style", subtitled "Taylor's Version", was released as part of 1989's re-recording, 1989 (Taylor's Version), on October 27, 2023. Swift produced "Style (Taylor's Version)" with Christopher Rowe, who had produced her previous re-recordings. The track was engineered by Derek Garten at Prime Recording Studio in Nashville, Tennessee; mixed by Ghenea at MixStar Studios in Virginia Beach, Virginia; and mastered by Randy Merrill at Sterling Sound in Edgewater, New Jersey. Rowe recorded Swift's vocals at Conway Recording Studios in Los Angeles and Kitty Committee Studio in New York.

=== Reception ===
Adam White from The Independent commented that the re-recording "sounds punishingly compressed [...] as though the mastering is off". Slant Magazine's Jonathan Keefe wrote that the "altered guitar tone" was a "distraction" but the song overall was "perfect pop songcraft". In American Songwriter, Alex Hopper said that the re-recorded "Style" featured Swift's matured vocals, which elevated an already great song. Pitchfork's Shaad D'Souza regarded the track as one of the album's "immaculate highs", and Rolling Stone UK's Mark Sutherland said the re-recording's production remained "astounding".

"Style (Taylor's Version)" peaked in the top 10 of charts in the Philippines (2), Australia (7), Canada (8), and New Zealand (8). In the United States, "Style (Taylor's Version)" debuted at number nine on the Billboard Hot 100 chart dated November 11, 2023, extending Swift's record for the most top-10 singles (49) on the Billboard Hot 100 among women. On the Billboard Global 200, it debuted at number five. With other 1989 (Taylor's Version) tracks, it helped Swift become the first artist to occupy the entire top six of the Global 200 chart simultaneously.

=== Personnel ===
Credits are adapted from the liner notes of 1989 (Taylor's Version).

- Taylor Swift – lead vocals, background vocals, songwriter, producer
- Max Bernstein – acoustic guitar, electric guitar, synth keyboards
- Matt Billingslea – membranophone programming
- Bryce Bordone – engineer for mix
- Dan Burns – additional programming, synth bass programming, synthesizer programming, additional engineering, membranophone programming
- Derek Garten – additional programming, engineer, editing
- Serban Ghenea – mixing
- Amos Heller – bass
- Max Martin – songwriter
- Ali Payami – songwriter
- Christopher Rowe – producer, vocals engineering
- Shellback – songwriter

=== Charts ===
==== Weekly charts ====
Weekly chart performance
Chart (2023–2025)	Peak position
Argentina Hot 100 (Billboard)	100
Australia (ARIA)	7
Brazil Hot 100 (Billboard)	58
Canada (Canadian Hot 100)	8
Canada CHR/Top 40 (Billboard)	40
France (SNEP)	135
Global 200 (Billboard)	5
Greece International (IFPI)	14
Ireland (Billboard)	9
Lithuania (AGATA)	74
Malaysia (Billboard)	17
Malaysia International (RIM)	3
MENA (IFPI)	10
New Zealand (Recorded Music NZ)	8
Philippines (Billboard)	2
Poland (Polish Streaming Top 100)	96
Saudi Arabia (IFPI)	19
Slovakia Singles Digital (ČNS IFPI)	21
Spain (Promusicae)	83
Sweden (Sverigetopplistan)	54
UAE (IFPI)	5
UK (Billboard)	10
UK Singles Downloads (Official Charts)	29
UK Singles Sales (OCC)	34
UK Streaming (OCC)	10
US Billboard Hot 100	9
US Adult Contemporary (Billboard)	19

==== Year-end charts ====
Year-end chart performance
Chart (2025)	Position
US Adult Contemporary (Billboard)	50

=== Certifications ===
Certifications
Region	Certification	Certified units/sales
Australia (ARIA)	Gold	35,000^{‡}
Brazil (Pro-Música Brasil)	2× Platinum	80,000^{‡}
France (SNEP)	Gold	100,000^{‡}
New Zealand (RMNZ)	Platinum	30,000^{‡}
United Kingdom (BPI)	Gold	400,000^{‡}
^{‡} Sales+streaming figures based on certification alone.

== See also ==
- List of Billboard Adult Contemporary number ones of 2015
- List of Billboard Hot 100 top-ten singles in 2015
- List of Billboard Mainstream Top 40 number-one songs of 2015
- List of number-one singles of 2015 (South Africa)
- List of highest-certified singles in Australia
