= Blank Space =

2014 single by Taylor Swift

Single by Taylor Swift

from the album 1989
- Released: November 10, 2014
- Studio: MXM (Stockholm, Sweden); Conway (Los Angeles, US)
- Genre: Electropop; synth-pop
- Length: 3:52
- Label: Big Machine
- Songwriters: Taylor Swift; Max Martin; Shellback
- Producers: Max Martin; Shellback

Taylor Swift singles chronology
"Shake It Off" (2014)	"Blank Space" (2014)	"Style" (2015)

Music video
- "Blank Space" on YouTube

"Blank Space" is a song by the American singer-songwriter Taylor Swift and the second single from her fifth studio album, 1989 (2014). She wrote the song with its producers, Max Martin and Shellback. Inspired by the media scrutiny on Swift's love life that affected her girl-next-door reputation, "Blank Space" portrays a flirtatious woman with multiple romantic attachments. It is an electropop and synth-pop track with a minimal arrangement consisting of synthesizers, hip-hop-influenced beats, and layered vocals.

Big Machine in partnership with Republic Records released "Blank Space" to US radio on November 10, 2014. One of the best-selling singles of 2015, it topped charts in Australia, Canada, Iceland, Scotland, and South Africa. In the United States, it spent seven weeks atop the Billboard Hot 100 and was certified eight times platinum by the Recording Industry Association of America (RIAA). Music critics praised the production and Swift's songwriting; some picked it as 1989's highlight. The song earned three nominations at the 58th Grammy Awards, including two general categories: Record of the Year and Song of the Year. Rolling Stone placed it at number 320 on their 2024 revision of the "500 Greatest Songs of All Time".

Joseph Kahn directed the music video for "Blank Space", which depicts Swift as a jealous woman who acts erratically when she suspects her boyfriend's infidelity. The video won Best Pop Video and Best Female Video at the 2015 MTV Video Music Awards, and it ranked 67th on Rolling Stone's "100 Greatest Music Videos of All Time" in 2021. Swift included "Blank Space" in the set lists for three of her world tours: the 1989 World Tour (2015), Reputation Stadium Tour (2018), and the Eras Tour (2023–2024). The song was covered by several rock musicians. Following the 2019 dispute regarding the ownership of Swift's back catalog, she re-recorded the song as "Blank Space (Taylor's Version)" for her 2023 re-recorded album 1989 (Taylor's Version).

== Background ==
Criticism has been a huge fuel for me. It's been a huge jumping-off point, like a creative writing prompt or something. There are so many songs in my career that would not exist–like "Blank Space"–would not exist if I hadn't had people being like, "Here's a slideshow of all her boyfriends."

— Swift on her songwriting process.

Inspired by 1980s synth-pop with synthesizers, drum pads, and overlapped vocals, Taylor Swift abandoned the country stylings of her previous releases to incorporate pop production for her fifth studio album, 1989, which was released in 2014. Swift began writing songs for the album in mid-2013 concurrently with the start of Swift's headlining world tour in support of her fourth studio album Red. On 1989, Swift and the Swedish producer Max Martin served as executive producers. Martin and his frequent collaborator Shellback produced seven out of 13 songs on the album's standard edition.

Having been known as "America's Sweetheart" thanks to her wholesome and down-to-earth girl next door image, Swift saw her reputation blemished due to her history of romantic relationships with a series of high-profile celebrities. The New York Times asserted in 2013 that her "dating history [had] begun to stir what feels like the beginning of a backlash", questioning whether Swift was in the midst of a quarter-life crisis. The Tampa Bay Times observed that until the release of 1989, Swift's love life had become a fixed tabloid interest and overshadowed her musicianship. Swift disliked the media portrayal of her as a "serial-dater", feeling that it undermined her professional works, and became reticent to discuss her personal life in public. The tabloid scrutiny on her image prompted her to write satirical songs about her perceived image, in addition to her traditional romantic themes.

== Lyrics and music ==
"Blank Space"
An electropop song set over minimal hip-hop-influenced beats, "Blank Space" satirizes Swift's image as a seductive woman with a long history of relationships.

Talking to GQ in 2015, Swift said that she envisioned "Blank Space" to be a satirical self-referential nod to the media perception of her image as "a girl who's crazy but seductive but glamorous but nuts but manipulative". She admitted that she had felt personally attacked for a long time before realizing "it was kind of hilarious". She co-wrote the song with its producers, Max Martin and Shellback.

"Blank Space" follows the verse–chorus song structure. The lyrics in the verses are clipped, "Magic, madness, heaven, sin", which the musicologist Nate Sloan said set a mysterious and dreadful tone. At one point, Swift describes herself as a "nightmare dressed like a daydream". The refrain alludes to Swift's songwriting practice taking inspiration from her love life: the lyrics, "Got a long list of ex-lovers They'll tell you I'm insane But I've got a blank space, baby", are followed by a brief silence and then a clicking retractable pen sound, and Swift concludes the refrain: "And I'll write your name." After the song's release, the ending of the line "Got a long list of ex-lovers" was misheard by some audience as "Starbucks lovers", which prompted internet discussions including a response from Starbucks themselves.

Swift told NME in 2015 that when "Blank Space" was released, "[half] the people got the joke, half the people really think that [she was] really owning the fact that [she was] a psychopath". According to Sloan, the narrator of "Blank Space" is unreliable, and therefore it is open to interpretation whether the song is a true portrayal of Swift's character or not. In contemporary publications, journalists commented that the track represented 1989's lighthearted view on failed relationships and departed from the idealized romance on Swift's past albums. Others wrote that Swift made fun of her image and the media discourse surrounding her celebrity, which later served as the foundation for her sixth studio album Reputation (2017), an album exploring her public experiences and the media gossip.

According to Swift, Martin and Shellback employed a sparse production for "Blank Space" because she wanted to emphasize the lyrics and vocals. Set over a tempo of 96 beats per minute, the track is a minimalist song that music critics described as electropop and synth-pop. It begins with two bars of drum machine beats that evoke hip-hop, accompanied by keyboards playing the musical notes C—F—A—F ostinato. The music critic Annie Zaleski described the beats as having a resonant quality, like sounds of a grandfather clock. As the track progresses, the lo-fi organ sound underlays the chord progression of F—Dm(7)—B♭—C, and its arrangement incorporates synthesizers, percussioned guitar strums, and layered backing vocals. Swift sing-speaks the verses, while in the refrain, she sings in her higher register as the production crescendos with faster programmed drums. Some critics compared the song's minimal production to the music of Lorde, specifically her 2013 album Pure Heroine. According to Spin's Andrew Unterberger, "Blank Space" embraces 1980s pop music authenticity, but it also incorporates a modern sonic approach.

== Release and commercial performance ==
"Blank Space" was the second single from 1989. In the United States, Big Machine and Republic Records released the song to rhythmic crossover radio on November 10, and hot adult contemporary and contemporary hit radio on November 11, 2014. Universal sent "Blank Space" to Italian radio on December 12, 2014, and released a CD single version of "Blank Space" in Germany on January 2, 2015. In the United Kingdom, the song was released as a single on December 15, 2014, by Big Machine and Mercury Records.

"Blank Space" debuted at number 18 on the Billboard Hot 100 chart dated November 15, 2014. The single reached number one in its third week on the chart, supported by the release of its music video. It took the number-one position from 1989's lead single "Shake It Off", making Swift the first woman to succeed herself at the top spot. "Blank Space" remained atop the Billboard Hot 100 for seven consecutive weeks. In August 2023, the song re-entered the Hot 100 and reached number 46 after it increased in streams; this was brought by Swift's announcement of the re-recorded album 1989 (Taylor's Version) and her performances of the song on the Eras Tour. The Recording Industry Association of America (RIAA) certified "Blank Space" eight-times platinum, which denotes eight million units based on sales and track-equivalent on-demand streams, in July 2018, and the single had sold 4.6 million digital copies in the United States by October 2022.

Elsewhere, "Blank Space" reached number one in Australia, Canada, South Africa, and Scotland. It peaked atop Billboard's Euro Digital Song Sales and the Finnish Download Chart. "Blank Space" charted within the top five of national record charts, at number two in New Zealand, Poland, Slovakia, number three in Bulgaria, number four in the Czech Republic, Ireland, Israel, the United Kingdom, and number five in Lebanon. The track received multi-platinum certifications in many countries, including fifteen-times platinum in Australia and four-times diamond in Brazil. It was certified six-times platinum in New Zealand; four-times platinum in Canada, Poland, United Kingdom; and double platinum in Austria and Portugal. According to the International Federation of the Phonographic Industry (IFPI), "Blank Space" was the eighth-best-selling song of 2015, selling 9.2 million units.

== Critical reception ==
"Blank Space" received critical acclaim for its production elements. Critics who selected "Blank Space" as a standout on 1989 included Shane Kimberline of MusicOMH, Sydney Gore of The 405, and Mikael Wood of the Los Angeles Times. PopMatters's Corey Baesley lauded it as "easily a candidate for the best pop song of 2014", writing that the minimal sound was both "bright and easy" and "weapons-grade, professional pop". Also praising the composition, Kitty Empire from The Observer highlighted the track's "intriguingly skeletal undercarriage" and the pen clicking sound as satisfying. In Vulture, Lindsay Zoladz opined that "Blank Space" was one of the strongest tracks of 1989 "on which Swift seems to be making pop music bend to her will".

Reviews also highlighted the lyricism. Aimee Cliff from Fact considered the song a self-aware portrayal of Swift's love life while also making the theme "larger than life", which made it an enjoyable listen. Writing for Drowned in Sound, Robert Leedham said that he enjoyed how "Blank Space" depicted Swift as "someone who finds success in misadventure, instead of wallowing in it". In congruence, Zoladz wrote that Swift's delivery of the line, "I can make the bad guys good for a weekend", was so confident that "it comes off as a threat". The New York Times's Jon Caramanica deemed the song "Swift at her peak" that "serves to assert both her power and her primness" by showcasing her humor and self-awareness. In a less enthusiastic review, The Independent's Andy Gill labelled it a "corporate rebel clichéd [sic]" song.

Retrospective reviews of "Blank Space" have been positive, frequently placing it within the upper-tier positions in rankings of Swift's entire discography. The track has been placed in the top 10 of Swift's catalog ranking by Jane Song from Paste (second), Hannah Mylrea from NME (third), Nate Jones from Vulture (third), and Rob Sheffield from Rolling Stone (eighth). Alexis Petridis of The Guardian, in his 2019 ranking of Swift's singles, placed "Blank Space" first. He contended that it succeeded in transforming Swift's image from a country singer-songwriter to a pop star thanks to its "effortless" melody and witty lyrics. In 2023, Billboard selected "Blank Space" as the best song by Swift, highlighting it as a career-defining moment when she took control of the public narrative surrounding her love life, and the Recording Academy picked it as one of her 13 essential songs that represented her musicianship.

== Accolades ==
Rolling Stone ranked "Blank Space" sixth on their list of the best songs of 2014, and 73rd on the best songs of the 2010s. On "500 Greatest Songs of All Time", Rolling Stone ranked it 357th in 2021, and later 320th in 2024. On other publications' rankings, "Blank Space" placed at number three on The Village Voice's 2014 year-end Pazz & Jop critics' poll, and number nine on Time's 2014 list; and it was featured at numbers 15, 49, and 72 on 2010s-decade-end lists by Slant Magazine, Stereogum and Uproxx. Billboard named it one of the 100 "Songs That Defined the Decade". Katie Atkinson wrote that the single consolidated Swift's trademark autobiographical storytelling in music while "setting the standard for a new, self-aware pop star".

"Blank Space" won Song of the Year at the 2015 American Music Awards. At the 2016 BMI Awards, the song was one of the Award-Winning Songs that helped Swift earn the honor Songwriter of the Year. It earned a nomination for International Work of the Year at the 2016 APRA Awards in Australia. At the 58th Annual Grammy Awards in 2016, "Blank Space" was nominated in three categories: Record of the Year, Song of the Year, and Best Pop Solo Performance.

== Music video ==
=== Development and release ===
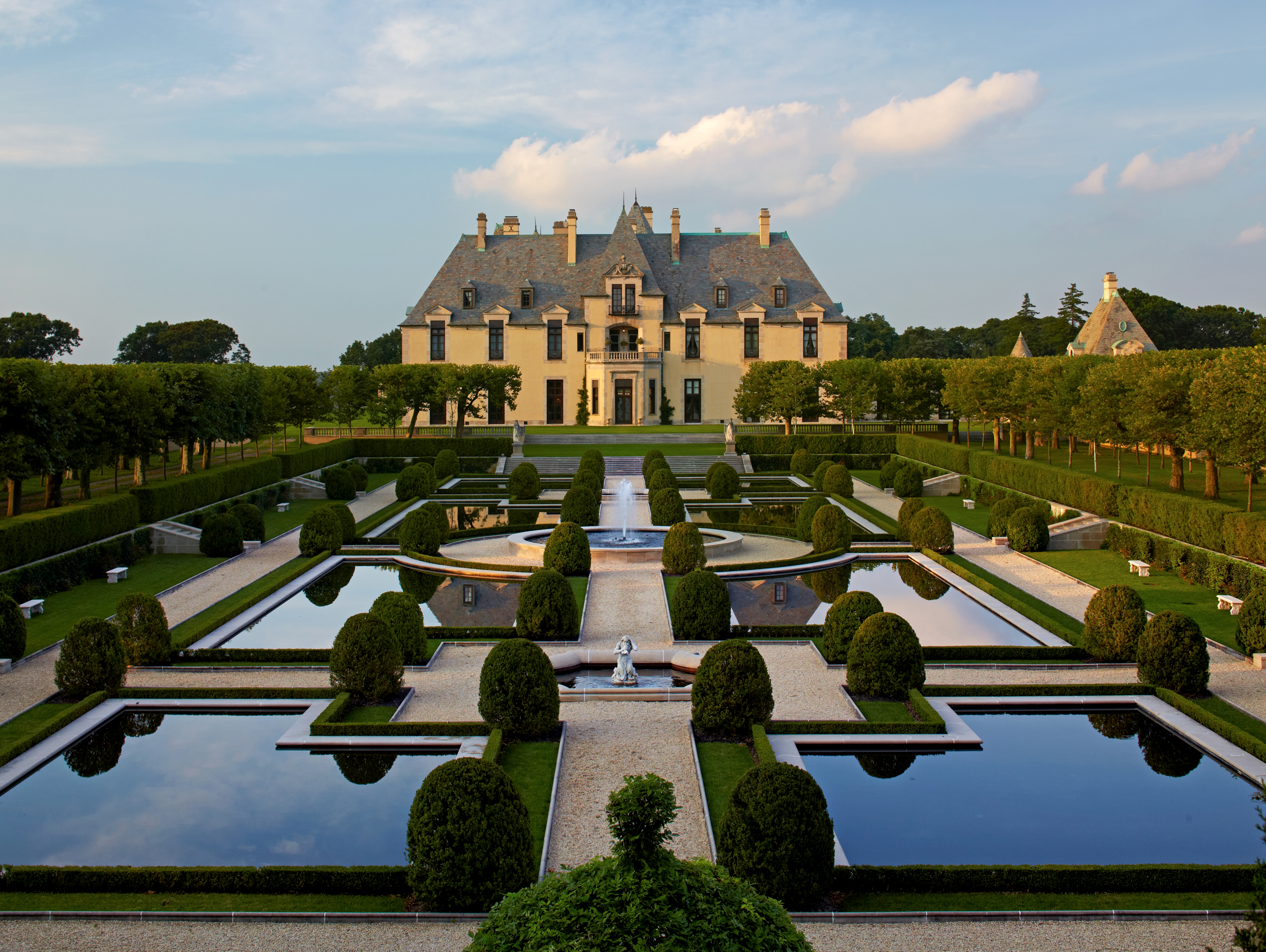
The video was primarily shot at Oheka Castle in Long Island, New York.

Joseph Kahn directed the music video for "Blank Space". According to Kahn, Swift conceptualized the video to "[address] this concept of, if she has so many boys breaking up with her maybe the problem isn't the boy, maybe the problem is her". Photography took place at two locations on Long Island: primary shooting took place at Oheka Castle, with a few additional scenes shot at Woolworth Estate. The video was shot over three days in September 2014. The last day was dedicated to film American Express Unstaged: Taylor Swift Experience, an interactive 360° mobile app in collaboration with American Express. Kahn told Mashable that Swift was thorough in choosing the visual devices and imagery: "When you have an artist wanting to test her imaging, it's always great territory to be in."

Kahn took inspirations from Stanley Kubrick's 1971 film A Clockwork Orange for the video's symmetrical framing style. The video begins as the male love interest (Sean O'Pry) drives an AC Cobra towards the mansion of Swift's character. They quickly become a loving couple: they dance together, paint a portrait of the boyfriend, walk along the estate grounds, and ride horses. Halfway through the video, Swift's character notices him texting someone, and the couple begins to fall apart: they begin to fight and Swift's character shows erratic behaviors such as throwing vases, slashing the painted portrait, and burning her boyfriend's clothes, which drives him to end the relationship. He then finds a hallway filled with other painted portraits that have been destroyed. Before the boyfriend leaves the mansion, Swift's character smashes her boyfriend's car using a golf club, a reference to Tiger Woods's 2009 cheating scandal. After he drives away, a new man (Andrea Denver) approaches, offering Swift a new hope for love.

Swift planned to premiere the video on Good Morning America on November 11, 2014, but Yahoo! accidentally leaked it a day before; Swift posted the video onto her Vevo account quickly afterwards. The interactive app American Express Unstaged: Taylor Swift Experience, featuring the 360° video version of "Blank Space", was released for free onto mobile app stores. The user can choose to either follow Swift and her love interest throughout the linear storyline, or leave the storyline to explore other rooms in the mansion and find interactive easter eggs, such as Swift's childhood photos. Kahn told Rolling Stone that the app was created with "superfans" who wanted to "feel even closer to Swift" in mind.

=== Reception ===
Some media outlets compared the narrative of "Blank Space" to that of Gone Girl, citing that both Swift's character and Gone Girl's protagonist "[strip] away the romantic sheen she's given all her relationships in the past". Randall Roberts from the Los Angeles Times wrote that Swift delivered an "Oscar-worthy" performance. Billboard praised the video's cinematic quality and aesthetics and found Swift's self-referential portrayal amusing, which served as "icing on the blood-filled cake". The Guardian's columnist Jessica Valenti complimented Swift's portrayal of her perceived image and dubbed the video "a feminist daydream", where "the narrow and sexist caricatures attached to women are acted out for our amusement, their full ridiculousness on display".

USA Today and Spin in 2017 deemed "Blank Space" the greatest video Swift had done; the latter praised the aesthetics as glamorous and lauded the hilarious depiction of Swift's reputation. Entertainment Weekly in 2020 picked "Blank Space" as the best video among the 1989 singles, describing it as "the only music video that can be earnestly described as 'Kubrickian'". It won Best Pop Video and Best Female Video at the 2015 MTV Video Music Awards and earned a nomination for Best International Female Video at the MTV Video Music Awards Japan. The American Express Unstaged: Taylor Swift Experience app won Original Interactive Program at the 67th Primetime Creative Arts Emmy Awards. Rolling Stone placed "Blank Space" at number 67 on its list of the "100 Greatest Music Videos of All Time" in 2021.

== Live performances and other versions ==
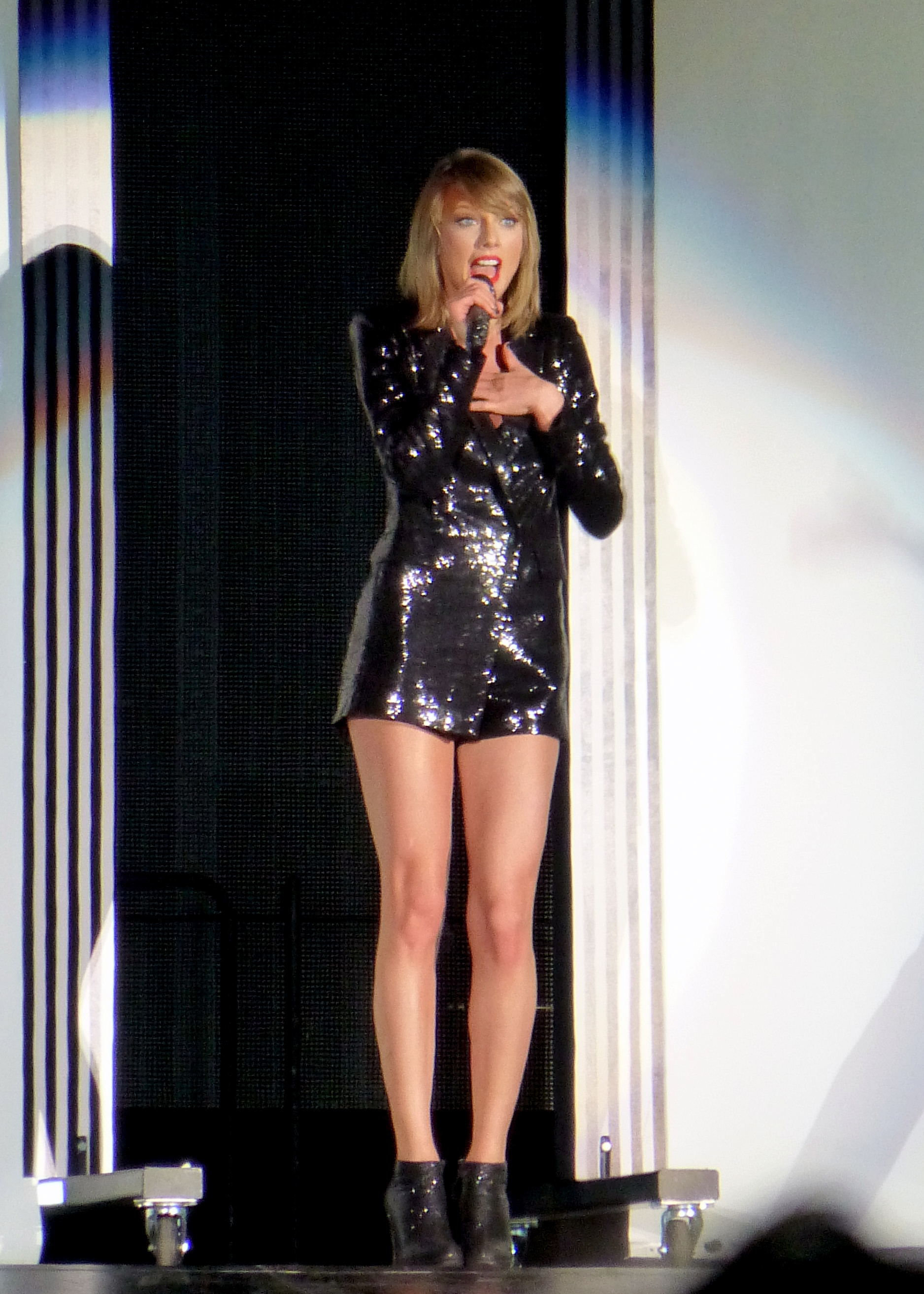
Swift performing "Blank Space" during the 1989 World Tour

Swift first performed "Blank Space" during a show at a rooftop in Manhattan celebrating the album's release on October 27, 2014, broadcast by Yahoo! and iHeartRadio with a light show provided by the Empire State Building. She premiered the song on television at the 2014 American Music Awards, where she recreated the narrative of the music video, acting as a psychopathic woman who acts erratically towards her boyfriend. She again performed the song on The Voice on November 25, at the 2014 Victoria's Secret Fashion Show on December 2, and during Capital FM's Jingle Bell Ball 2014 in London, broadcast on December 5.

On February 25, 2015, Swift opened the 2015 Brit Awards with a rendition of "Blank Space". At the beginning of the performance, Swift sang the song in front of a white background featuring silhouettes of backup dancers. The song was part of the set lists for three of Swift's concert tours—the 1989 World Tour (2015), Reputation Stadium Tour (2018), and the Eras Tour (2023–2024). On September 9, 2019, Swift performed the song at the City of Lover one-off concert in Paris, France. She performed the song again at the We Can Survive charity concert on October 19, 2019, in Los Angeles. At the 2019 American Music Awards, where Swift was honored Artist of the Decade, she performed "Blank Space" as part of a medley of her hits. She again performed the song at Capital FM's Jingle Bell Ball 2019 in London, and at iHeartRadio Z100's Jingle Ball 2019 in New York City. On October 17, 2026, Swift performed "Blank Space" as part of a four-song closing set at the Academy Museum Gala, an annual fundraiser for the Academy Museum of Motion Pictures.

Following the song's debut at the 2014 American Music Awards, the rapper Pitbull uploaded a remix featuring his rap verse to SoundCloud on December 15, 2014. The retro music group Postmodern Jukebox transformed the song into a 1940s-inspired track in their cover, and the rock band Imagine Dragons performed a slowed down rendition of the song sampling Ben E. King's "Stand by Me" at BBC Radio 1 Live Lounge in February 2015. I Prevail, another rock band, released a post-hardcore cover of "Blank Space" as their debut single in December 2014. The cover reached number nine on Billboard Hot Rock Songs and number 90 on the Billboard Hot 100, and received a platinum certification by the RIAA, which denotes one million track-equivalent units. It was also certified platinum by the Australian Recording Industry Association (ARIA) in 2025.

The rock singer Ryan Adams covered "Blank Space" on his 2015 track-by-track cover album of Swift's 1989. On his rendition, Adams incorporated stripped-down, acoustic string instruments, contrasting the original's electronic production. The indie singer Father John Misty released a cover version of the song in the style of the rock band the Velvet Underground in 2015. The cover is a reinterpretation of Adams's version and is built on the melody of the song "I'm Waiting for the Man".

== Credits and personnel ==
Credits adapted from the liner notes of 1989

- Taylor Swift – vocals, background vocals, songwriter, shouts
- Cory Bice – recording assistant
- Tom Coyne – mastering
- Serban Ghenea – mixing
- John Hanes – mixing engineer
- Sam Holland – recording
- Michael Ilbert – audio recording
- Max Martin – producer, songwriter, keyboards, programming
- Shellback – producer, songwriter, acoustic guitar, electric guitar, bass, keyboards, percussion, programming, shouts, stomps

== Charts ==
=== Weekly charts ===
2014–2015 weekly chart performance
Chart (2014–2015)	Peak position
Australia (ARIA)	1
Austria (Ö3 Austria Top 40)	6
Belgium (Ultratop 50 Flanders)	13
Belgium (Ultratop 50 Wallonia)	26
Brazil (Billboard Hot 100)	59
Bulgaria Airplay (BAMP)	3
Canada Hot 100 (Billboard)	1
Canada AC (Billboard)	2
Canada CHR/Top 40 (Billboard)	1
Canada Hot AC (Billboard)	1
CIS Airplay (TopHit)	99
Czech Republic Airplay (ČNS IFPI)	4
Denmark Airplay (Tracklisten)	6
Euro Digital Song Sales (Billboard)	1
Finland Airplay (Radiosoittolista)	3
Finland Download (Latauslista)	1
France (SNEP)	27
France Airplay (SNEP)	18
Germany (GfK)	9
Germany Airplay (BVMI)	3
Greece Digital Songs (Billboard)	2
Hong Kong (HKRIA)	18
Hungary (Single Top 40)	7
Iceland (RÚV)	1
Ireland (IRMA)	4
Israel International Airplay (Media Forest)	4
Italy (FIMI)	27
Italy Digital (Billboard)	10
Japan Hot 100 (Billboard)	45
Japan Adult Contemporary (Billboard)	10
Lebanon (Lebanese Top 20)	5
Luxembourg Digital Song Sales (Billboard)	4
Mexico Airplay (Billboard)	2
Netherlands (Dutch Top 40)	17
Netherlands (Single Tip)	3
New Zealand (Recorded Music NZ)	2
Poland Airplay (ZPAV)	2
Portugal Digital Song Sales (Billboard)	5
Romania (Airplay 100)	34
Russia Airplay (TopHit)	103
Scottish Singles Sales (Official Charts)	1
Slovakia Airplay (ČNS IFPI)	2
Slovenia Airplay (SloTop50)	9
South Africa Airplay (EMA)	1
South Korea International (Gaon)	54
Spain (Promusicae)	16
Switzerland (Schweizer Hitparade)	12
Ukraine Airplay (TopHit)	145
UK Singles (Official Charts)	4
US Billboard Hot 100	1
US Adult Contemporary (Billboard)	1
US Adult Pop Airplay (Billboard)	1
US Dance Club Songs (Billboard)	23
US Latin Airplay (Billboard)	48
US Pop Airplay (Billboard)	1
US Rhythmic Airplay (Billboard)	14
Venezuela Airplay (Record Report)	2

2021–2026 weekly chart performance
Chart (2021–2026)	Peak position
Germany (GfK Entertainment Charts)	23
Global 200 (Billboard)	32
Greece International (IFPI Greece)	64
Italy (FIMI)	89
Malaysia International (RIM)	15
Netherlands (Single Tip)	17
New Zealand Catalogue Singles (RMNZ)	13
Philippines (Billboard)	25
Philippines (Philippine Hot 100)	93
Poland (Polish Airplay Top 100)	56
Portugal (AFP)	18
Singapore (RIAS)	5
Sweden Heatseeker (Sverigetopplistan)	7
Switzerland (Schweizer Hitparade)	20
UK Audio Streaming (Official Charts)	43
US Billboard Hot 100	46
Vietnam Hot 100 (Billboard)	57

=== Year-end charts ===
2014 year-end charts
Chart (2014)	Position
Australia (ARIA)	28
Hungary (Single Top 40)	92
New Zealand (Recorded Music NZ)	46
UK Singles (OCC)	64

2015 year-end charts
Chart (2015)	Position
Australia (ARIA)	55
Austria (Ö3 Austria Top 40)	58
Belgium (Ultratop Flanders)	73
Belgium (Ultratop Wallonia)	84
Canada (Canadian Hot 100)	6
France (SNEP)	173
Germany (Official German Charts)	80
Hungary (Single Top 40)	58
Netherlands (Dutch Top 40)	83
Netherlands (NPO 3FM)	76
Poland (ZPAV)	33
Slovenia (SloTop50)	15
Switzerland (Schweizer Hitparade)	67
UK Singles (Official Charts Company)	67
US Billboard Hot 100	7
US Adult Contemporary (Billboard)	5
US Adult Pop Songs (Billboard)	9
US Pop Songs (Billboard)	6

2016 year-end chart
Chart (2016)	Position
Brazil (Brasil Hot 100)	74

2023 year-end charts
Chart (2023)	Position
Australia (ARIA)	59
Global 200 (Billboard)	67

=== Decade-end charts ===
2010s decade-end charts
Chart (2010–2019)	Position
Australia (ARIA)	84
US Billboard Hot 100	65

=== All-time charts ===
All-time charts
Chart	Position
US Billboard Hot 100 (Note: Compiled by Billboard for singles 1958–2018)	387
US Pop Songs (Billboard) (Note: Compiled by Billboard for singles 1992–2017)	90

== Certifications ==
Certifications and thresholds
Region	Certification	Certified units/sales
Australia (ARIA)	15× Platinum	1,050,000^{‡}
Austria (IFPI Austria)	2× Platinum	60,000^{*}
Brazil (Pro-Música Brasil)	4× Diamond	1,000,000^{‡}
Canada (Music Canada)	4× Platinum	320,000^{*}
Denmark (IFPI Danmark)	Platinum	90,000^{‡}
Germany (BVMI)	Platinum	600,000^{‡}
Italy (FIMI)	Platinum	50,000^{‡}
Japan (RIAJ)	Gold	100,000^{*}
Mexico (AMPROFON)	Gold	30,000^{*}
New Zealand (RMNZ)	6× Platinum	180,000^{‡}
Norway (IFPI Norway)	Platinum	60,000^{‡}
Poland (ZPAV)	4× Platinum	200,000^{‡}
Portugal (AFP)	2× Platinum	40,000^{‡}
Spain (Promusicae)	Platinum	60,000^{‡}
Switzerland (IFPI Switzerland)	Gold	15,000^{‡}
United Kingdom (BPI)	4× Platinum	2,400,000^{‡}
United States (RIAA)	8× Platinum	8,000,000^{‡}
Streaming
Greece (IFPI Greece)	Platinum	2,000,000^{†}
Japan (RIAJ)	Gold	50,000,000^{†}
^{*} Sales figures based on certification alone.^{‡} Sales+streaming figures based on certification alone.^{†} Streaming-only figures based on certification alone.

== Release history ==
Release dates and formats
Region	Date	Format	Label(s)	Ref.
United States	November 10, 2014	Rhythmic radio	Big Machine; Republic	
United States	November 11, 2014	Contemporary hit radio	Big Machine; Republic	
United States	November 11, 2014	Hot adult contemporary radio	Republic	
Italy	December 12, 2014	Radio airplay	Universal	
Germany	January 2, 2015	CD single	Universal	

== "Blank Space (Taylor's Version)" ==
"Blank Space (Taylor's Version)"

Song by Taylor Swift

from the album 1989 (Taylor's Version)
- Released: October 27, 2023
- Studio: Prime Recording (Nashville)
- Length: 3:51
- Label: Republic
- Songwriters: Taylor Swift; Max Martin; Shellback
- Producers: Taylor Swift; Christopher Rowe

Lyric video
- "Blank Space (Taylor's Version)" on YouTube

After signing a new contract with Republic Records in 2018, Swift began re-recording her first six studio albums in November 2020. The decision followed a public 2019 dispute between Swift and the music executive Scooter Braun, who acquired Big Machine Records, including the masters of Swift's albums which the label had released. By re-recording the albums, Swift had full ownership of the new masters, which enabled her to control the licensing of her songs for commercial use and therefore substituted the Big Machine–owned masters.

The re-recording of "Blank Space", subtitled "Taylor's Version", was released as part of 1989's re-recording, 1989 (Taylor's Version), on October 27, 2023. Swift produced "Blank Space (Taylor's Version)" with Christopher Rowe, who had produced her previous re-recordings. The track was engineered by Derek Garten at Prime Recording Studio in Nashville, Tennessee; mixed by Ghenea at MixStar Studios in Virginia Beach, Virginia; and mastered by Randy Merrill at Sterling Sound in Edgewater, New Jersey. Rowe and Sam Holland recorded Swift's vocals at Conway Recording Studios in Los Angeles and Kitty Committee Studio in New York.

=== Reception ===
Music critics were generally positive towards "Blank Space (Taylor's Version)", although there were conflicting opinions. The Line of Best Fit's Kelsey Barnes commented that the re-recorded song sounded like an "exact replica" of the original, and NME's Hollie Geraghty praised the re-recording for showcasing one of the album's "deliciously polished belters" that still sounded fresh after a decade. The Independent's Adam White and American Songwriter's Alex Hopper both remarked that Swift's voice sounded more matured, but they had different opinions: the former said that it eroded the "raw mania" of the original song, while the latter complimented that it made the track "hit even harder".

"Blank Space (Taylor's Version)" peaked at number nine on the Billboard Global 200 chart. On national singles charts, the re-recorded song peaked within the top 20 in Australia (9), Canada (11), New Zealand (12), and the United States (12). The track was certified diamond in France.

=== Personnel ===
Credits adapted from the liner notes of 1989 (Taylor's Version)

- Taylor Swift – lead vocals, background vocals, songwriter, producer
- Matt Billingslea – drums programming, membranophone, electric guitar, synthesizer
- Bryce Bordone – engineer for mix
- Dan Burns – synth bass programming, synth programming, additional engineer
- Derek Garten – additional programming, engineer, editor
- Serban Ghenea – mixing
- Sam Holland – vocals recording
- Max Martin – songwriter
- Mike Meadows – acoustic guitar, electric guitar, synthesizer
- Randy Merrill – mastering
- Christopher Rowe – producer, background vocals, vocals recording
- Shellback – songwriter

=== Charts ===
Weekly chart performance
Chart (2023)	Peak position
Australia (ARIA)	9
Brazil Hot 100 (Billboard)	63
Canada (Canadian Hot 100)	11
France (SNEP)	165
Global 200 (Billboard)	9
Greece International (IFPI)	16
Ireland (Billboard)	12
Malaysia (Billboard)	25
Malaysia International (RIM)	4
MENA (IFPI)	16
New Zealand (Recorded Music NZ)	12
Philippines (Billboard)	7
Spain (Promusicae)	100
Sweden (Sverigetopplistan)	66
UAE (IFPI)	7
UK (Billboard)	15
UK Singles Downloads (Official Charts)	35
UK Singles Sales (OCC)	40
UK Streaming (OCC)	17
US Billboard Hot 100	12
Vietnam Hot 100 (Billboard)	49

=== Certifications ===
Certifications and thresholds
Region	Certification	Certified units/sales
Australia (ARIA)	Platinum	70,000^{‡}
Brazil (Pro-Música Brasil)	Gold	20,000^{‡}
France (SNEP)	Diamond	333,333^{‡}
New Zealand (RMNZ)	Gold	15,000^{‡}
United Kingdom (BPI)	Silver	200,000^{‡}
^{‡} Sales+streaming figures based on certification alone.

== See also ==
- List of best-selling singles in the United Kingdom
- List of Billboard Hot 100 number ones of 2014
- List of Billboard Hot 100 number ones of 2015
- List of Billboard Adult Contemporary number ones of 2015
- List of Canadian Hot 100 number-one singles of 2014
- List of highest-certified singles in Australia
- List of number-one singles of 2014 (Australia)
- List of number-one singles of 2015 (South Africa)
- List of most-viewed YouTube videos
