= Oliver Heldens discography =

This is the discography of Dutch DJ Oliver Heldens.

== DJ mixes ==
- 2020: Tomorrowland Around the World 2020: Oliver Heldens

== Singles ==
=== As lead artist ===
List of singles, with selected chart positions and certifications
Title	Year	Peak chart positions										Certifications
Title	Year	NLD	AUS	AUT	BEL (FL)	FRA	GER	IRL	SWE	SWI	UK	Certifications
"Stinger"	2013	—	—	—	—	—	—	—	—	—	—	
"Juggernaut"	2013	—	—	—	—	—	—	—	—	—	—	
"Striker"	2013	—	—	—	—	—	—	—	—	—	—	
"Thumper" (with Jacob van Hage)	2013	—	—	—	—	—	—	—	—	—	—	
"Triumph" (with Julian Calor)	2013	—	—	—	—	—	—	—	—	—	—	
"Buzzer"	2013	—	—	—	—	—	—	—	—	—	—	
"Onyva" (featuring Alvar & Millas)	2013	—	—	—	—	—	—	—	—	—	—	
"Javelin" (with Martin Mayne)	2013	—	—	—	—	—	—	—	—	—	—	
"Panther" (with Robby East)	2013	—	—	—	—	—	—	—	—	—	—	
"Gecko"	2013	32	—	—	46	73	—	—	—	—	—	
"Gecko (Overdrive)" (with Becky Hill)	2014	48	71	35	—	—	23	30	55	23	1	BPI: 3× Platinum; BVMI: Gold
"Koala"	2014	23	—	—	33	—	—	—	—	—	—	
"This" (with Sander van Doorn)	2014	—	—	—	—	—	—	—	—	—	—	
"Pikachu" (with Mr. Belt & Wezol)	2014	—	—	—	—	—	—	—	—	—	—	
"Last All Night (Koala)" (featuring KStewart)	2014	—	—	67	—	132	53	—	—	—	5	BPI: Silver
"You Know" (with Zeds Dead)	2015	— (Note: "You Know" did not enter the Dutch Single Top 100, but peaked at number 20 on the Single Tip chart.)	—	—	— (Note: "You Know" did not enter the Flemish Ultratop 50, but peaked at number 56 on the Ultratip chart.)	—	—	—	—	—	—	
"Melody"	2015	—	—	—	— (Note: "Melody" did not enter the Flemish Ultratop 50, but peaked at number 12 on the Ultratip chart.)	—	—	—	—	—	—	
"Bunnydance"	2015	—	—	—	—	—	—	—	—	—	—	
"Shades of Grey" (with Shaun Frank featuring Delaney Jane)	2015	65	—	—	— (Note: "Shades of Grey" did not enter the Flemish Ultratop 50, but peaked at number ten on the Ultratip chart.)	—	—	—	—	—	—	
"Wombass" (with Tiësto)	2015	— (Note: "Wombass" did not enter the Dutch Single Top 100, but peaked at number 21 on the Single Tip chart.)	—	—	— (Note: "Wombass" did not enter the Flemish Ultratop 50, but peaked at number 44 on the Ultratip chart.)	—	—	—	—	—	—	
"The Right Song" (with Tiësto featuring Natalie La Rose)	2016	46	—	—	—	—	—	57	100	—	39	BPI: Gold
"Waiting" (with Throttle)	2016	—	—	—	—	—	—	—	—	—	—	
"Ghost" (featuring Rumors)	2016	—	—	—	—	—	—	—	—	—	—	
"Space Sheep" (with Chocolate Puma)	2016	—	—	—	—	—	—	—	—	—	—	
"Flamingo"	2016	—	—	—	—	—	—	—	—	—	—	
"Good Life" (featuring Ida Corr)	2016	—	—	—	—	—	—	—	—	—	—	
"I Don't Wanna Go Home"	2017	—	—	—	—	—	—	—	—	—	—	
"Ibiza 77 (Can You Feel It)"	2017	—	—	—	—	—	—	—	—	—	—	
"What the Funk" (featuring Danny Shah)	2017	—	—	—	—	—	—	—	—	—	—	
"Riverside 2099" (with Sidney Samson)	2018	—	—	—	—	—	—	—	—	—	—	
"Fire in My Soul" (featuring Shungudzo)	2018	—	—	—	—	—	—	—	—	—	—	
"This Groove" (with Lenno)	2019	—	—	—	—	—	—	—	—	—	—	
"Summer Lover" (featuring Devin and Nile Rodgers)	2019	—	—	—	—	—	—	—	—	—	—	
"Cucumba" (with Moguai)	2019	—	—	—	—	—	—	—	—	—	—	
"Turn Me On" (with Riton featuring Vula)	2019	38	38	58	12	84	18	11	—	38	12	ARIA: Platinum; IFPI AUT: Platinum; BPI: Platinum; BRMA: Gold; BVMI: Platinum; SNEP: Platinum; IFPI SWI: Gold
"Lift Me Up" (with Firebeatz and Schella featuring Carla Monroe)	2019	—	—	—	—	—	—	—	—	—	—	
"Aquarius"	2019	—	—	—	—	—	—	—	—	—	—	
"The G.O.A.T." (with Mesto)	2020	—	—	—	—	—	—	—	—	—	—	
"Take a Chance"	2020	—	—	—	—	—	—	—	—	—	—	
"Details" (featuring Boy Matthews)	2020	—	—	—	—	—	—	—	—	—	—	
"Rave Machine"	2020	—	—	—	—	—	—	—	—	—	—	
"Break This Habit" (featuring Kiko Bun)	2020	—	—	—	—	—	—	—	—	—	—	
"Somebody" (with Funkin Matt featuring Bright Sparks)	2020	—	—	—	—	—	—	—	—	—	—	
"Set Me Free" (with Party Pupils featuring Max)	2020	—	—	—	—	—	—	—	—	—	—	
"Freedom for My People" (with Shungudzo)	2020	—	—	—	—	—	—	—	—	—	—	
"Never Look Back" (featuring Syd Silvair)	2021	—	—	—	—	—	—	—	—	—	—	
"Zapdos"	2021	—	—	—	—	—	—	—	—	—	—	
"Ma Luv" (with MorganJ)	2021	—	—	—	—	—	—	—	—	—	—	
"Deja Vu" (with Anabel Englund)	2021	—	—	—	—	—	—	—	—	—	—	
"I Was Made for Lovin' You" (featuring Nile Rodgers and House Gospel Choir)	2022	— (Note: "I Was Made for Lovin' You" did not enter the Dutch Single Top 100, but peaked at number three on the Single Tip chart.)	—	—	—	—	—	—	—	—	—	
"10 Out of 10" (with Kylie Minogue)	2023	—	—	—	—	—	—	—	—	—	—	
"Out of Love" (with WeiBird)	2023	—	—	—	—	—	—	—	—	—	—	
"Chills (Feel My Love)" (with David Guetta and Fast Boy)	2024	—	—	—	—	—	―	—	—	—	—	
"Ruins" (with Julia Church)	2025	—	—	—	—	—	—	—	—	—	—	
"Open Your Heart"	2025	—	—	—	—	—	—	—	—	—	—	
"—" denotes a single that did not chart or was not released.

=== As Hi-Lo ===
List of singles as lead artist, showing year released, record label and album name
Title	Year	Label
"Crank It Up"	2015	Mad Decent
"Renegade Mastah"	2015	Heldeep
"Wappy Flirt"	2015	Heldeep
"Ooh La La"	2015	Heldeep
"Steam Train" (with Chocolate Puma)	2016	Heldeep
"WTF" (with Sander van Doorn)	2016	Heldeep
"Alien Technology" (with Alok)	2017	Heldeep
"Men On Mars"	2017	Heldeep
"Love Vibrations" (with Dada Life)	2018	Heldeep
"Impulse" (with Mike Cervello)	2018	Heldeep
"Lazerx999" (with Chocolate Puma)	2019	Heldeep
"Poseidon"	2019	Heldeep
"Zeus"	2020	Mau5trap
"Kronos"	2020	Heldeep
"Athena"	2021	Octopus Recordings
"Saw of Olympus" (with Reinier Zonneveld)	2021	Filth On Acid
"Check" (with Will Clarke)	2021	Filth On Acid
"Hypnos / Hera"	2021	Drumcode
"String Theory" (with Reinier Zonneveld)	2021	Filth On Acid
"Industria" (with Eli Brown)	2022	Kangarooli Tracks
"Rabbit Hole" (with Layton Giordani)	2022	Drumcode
"Samsara" (with Reinier Zonneveld)	2022	Filth On Acid
"Genesis" (with Space 92)	2024	Hilomatik

== Guest appearances ==
Title	Year	Other artist(s)	Album
"Ting Ting Ting"	2020	Itzy	It'z Me

== Remixes ==
List of remixes, showing year released and original artists
Year	Title	Original artists
2014	"Animals" (Oliver Heldens Remix)	Martin Garrix
2014	"Feel Good" (Oliver Heldens Remix)	Robin Thicke
2014	"Latch" (Oliver Heldens Remix) (NOTE: Would later devolve into the remix of Lady B's cover of Return Of The Mack)	Disclosure (featuring Sam Smith)
2014	"A Sky Full of Stars" (Oliver Heldens Remix)	Coldplay
2014	"Return of the Mack" (Oliver Heldens Remix)	Lady Bee (featuring Rochelle)
2014	"Can't Stop Playing" (Oliver Heldens and Gregor Salto Remix)	Dr. Kucho! and Gregor Salto
2014	"A Lot like Love" (Oliver Heldens Edit)	The Voyagers (featuring Haris)
2014	"Light Years Away" (Oliver Heldens Remix)	Tiësto (featuring Dbx)
2015	"Outside" (Oliver Heldens Remix)	Calvin Harris (featuring Ellie Goulding)
2015	"MHATLP" (Hi-Lo Edit)	Oliver Heldens and Da Hool
2016	"Me, Myself & I" (Oliver Heldens Remix)	G-Eazy and Bebe Rexha
2016	"Go" (Hi-Lo Remix)	Moby
2016	"All We Know" (Oliver Heldens Remix)	The Chainsmokers (featuring Phoebe Ryan)
2017	"The Answer" (Oliver Heldens Edit)	HI-LO
2017	"Chained to the Rhythm" (Oliver Heldens Remix)	Katy Perry (featuring Skip Marley)
2017	"The Journey" (Oliver Heldens Edit)	Aevion
2017	"$4,000,000" (Oliver Heldens Remix)	Steve Aoki and Bad Royale (featuring Mase and Big Gigantic)
2018	"King Kong" (Hi-Lo Touch)	Oliver Heldens
2018	"One Kiss" (Oliver Heldens Remix)	Calvin Harris and Dua Lipa
2018	"Don't Leave Me Alone" (Oliver Heldens Remix)	David Guetta (featuring Anne-Marie)
2018	"Le Freak" (Oliver Heldens Remix)	Chic
2019	"Lalala" (Oliver Heldens Remix)	Y2K and bbno$
2020	"The Other Side" (Oliver Heldens Remix)	SZA and Justin Timberlake
2020	"Daisies" (Oliver Heldens Remix)	Katy Perry
2020	"Tear It Up" (Oliver Heldens Remix)	Solardo and Paul Woolford (featuring Pamela Fernandez)
2021	"Thing Called Love" (Oliver Heldens Remix)	Above & Beyond (featuring Richard Bedford)
2021	"Heat Waves" (Oliver Heldens Remix)	Glass Animals
2021	"By Your Side" (Oliver Heldens Remix)	Calvin Harris (featuring Tom Grennan)
2021	"Skyscrapers" (Hi-Lo Remix)	Nina Kraviz
2022	"In the Dark" (Oliver Heldens Remix)	Purple Disco Machine and Sophie and the Giants
2023	"Désenchantée" (Oli's EuroRave Mix)	Kate Ryan
