= Dopamine (disambiguation) =

Dopamine is a chemical naturally produced in the body.

Dopamine may also refer to:

== Science ==
- Dopamine (medication) a medication used to treat a number of health problems
- Dopamine receptor
- Dopamine transporter

== Films ==
- Dopamine (2003 film), a film written and directed by Mark Decena
- Dopamine (2025 film), an Indonesian film written and directed by Teddy Soeria Atmadja

== Music ==
=== Albums ===
- Dopamine (Third Eye Blind album), 2015
- Dopamine (Børns album), 2015
- Dopamine (Mila J album), 2017
- Dopamine, by Thunder, 2022
- Dopamine (Normani album), 2024
- Dopamine (Lil Tecca album), 2025

=== Musicians ===
- Nina Dopamine, stage name of Nian Hu, American musician

=== Songs ===
- "Dopamine" (Purple Disco Machine song), 2021
- "Dopamine" (Robyn song), 2025
- "Dopamine", by Tony Iommi and Glenn Hughes from Fused, 2005
- "Dopamine", by Jessie J from R.O.S.E., 2018
- "Dopamine", by Jackson Wang from Magic Man, 2022
- "Dopamine", by Sum 41 from Heaven :x: Hell, 2024
- "Dopamine", by Giselle from Synk: Parallel Line, 2024

== See also ==
- Dopamin, an album by the German band Böhse Onkelz
- "Dopamin", an instrumental track from the album Ego by Oomph!
- "Dopamina", a song by Belinda
