= Kate Stewart =

English singer-songwriter (born 1995)

- Born: Kate Stewart; 16 January 1995 (age 31); London, England, UK
- Education: Arts Educational Schools, London
- Occupations: Singer; songwriter
- Parent: Allan Stewart
- Relatives: David Stewart (brother)
- Musical career
- Genres: R&B; pop; soul; dance-pop
- Instrument: Vocals
- Years active: 2011-present
- Labels: Warner Music; PLATOON

Kate Stewart (born 16 January 1995), also formerly known as KStewart, is an English singer-songwriter. She featured on the vocal version of Oliver Heldens's "Koala", and her song "Ain't Nobody" charted at number 86 on the UK Singles Chart. On 23 November 2018, she released her first EP, named In the Beginning.

== Life and career ==
=== 1995-2017: Early life and career beginnings ===
Kate Stewart was born on 16 January 1995 in London and grew up in Maida Vale. She grew up in an artistic family: her father is a comedian and her mother was a dancer. Stewart has a brother who is a music producer and songwriter. She was educated at Arts Educational Schools, London (ArtsEd) in Chiswick, where she learned musical theatre. She initially wanted to be an actress, but later turned to music.

In 2014, under the name "KStewart", she released her first single "Tell Me 'Bout That", which she collaborated in concert with British duo Bondax. During these years, she worked and collaborated with many artists such as Matoma, Sean Paul, Yungen, TCTS, and Craig David. Stewart was invited to perform her music with French DJ David Guetta for Danse avec les stars, the French equivalent of Strictly Come Dancing. Stewart was signed to Warner Music Group, making pop-oriented music.

=== 2018-present: In the Beginning ===
In May 2018, Stewart announced her new project and released the first single "Loving You", at the same time going independent and changing her stage name to "Kate Stewart". On 23 November 2018, she released her first EP "In the Beginning" under the label Platoon. On 11 February 2019, Stewart released a music video for "Bad Enough". Later in 2019, she announced a collaboration with singer and songwriter Ryan Ashley for the song "Innocent", which was released on 3 June.

== Artistry ==
=== Influences ===
Stewart grew up listening to pop artists such as Whitney Houston, Destiny's Child, Beyoncé, Mariah Carey and Christina Aguilera. Other musicians she admire include D'Angelo and Frank Ocean.

=== Voice ===
Stewart is a soprano and possesses a three-octave vocal range. Her voice has received comparisons with Ariana Grande and Jorja Smith.

== Discography ==
=== EPs ===
In the Beginning (2018)
No.	Title	Writer(s)	Producer(s)	Length
1.	"In the Beginning"	Kate Stewart; Ryan Campbell; Ronald Arvant; Callum Connor	Arvant; Connor	1:39
2.	"Loving You"	K. Stewart; Campbell; Benjamin Bravo	B Bravo	3:30
3.	"He's Good"	K. Stewart; Fatimah Warner; Bravo; Farrah Guenea	B Bravo	3:03
4.	"Strangers"	K. Stewart; Chiara Hunter; David Stewart	D. Stewart	3:51
5.	"Distraction"	K. Stewart; Lewis Jankel; Guenea	Shift K3Y	3:20
6.	"RyRy"	K. Stewart	Ryan Ashley	0:48
7.	"Bad Enough"	K. Stewart; Benjamin Totten; Guenea	Totten	3:24
8.	"On My Mind"	K. Stewart; Paul Phamous; Simen Thunes Hope; Askjeil Solstrand	5YA	3:15
Total length:				22:51

You Had To Be Here (2023)
No.	Title	Writer(s)	Producer(s)	Length
1.	"Never Enough"	Kate Stewart; David Stewart; Jessica Agombar	David Stewart	3:19
2.	"Everybody Loves Me"	K. Stewart; David Arcelious Harris; Evan Brown; Farrah Guenena; Josiah Bassey	Swag R'celious; Brown; Bassey	2:39
3.	"When It's Just Me"	K. Stewart; Tim Block	Tim Block	3:25
4.	"Fuck You"	K. Stewart; Bassey	Bassey	3:30
5.	"Me + You"	K. Stewart; Ankit Suri; Guenena; Moyses Dos Santos	Suri; Dos Santos	3:55
Total length:				16:50

=== Singles ===
==== as lead artist ====
Title	Year	Album
"Ain't Nobody"	2015	Non-album single
"Be Without You"	2016	Non-album single
"Hands" (featuring Yungen)	2017	Non-album single
"Sex 4 Breakfast"	2017	Non-album single
"Secrets" (with WHTKD)	2017	Non-album single
"Loving You"	2018	In the Beginning EP
"He's Good"	2018	In the Beginning EP
"On my Mind"	2018	In the Beginning EP
"Get Mine"	2019	Non-album single
"High" (featuring Jevon)	2019	Non-album single
"Spoiled Your Fun"	2020	Non-album single
"Hate You"	2022	Non-album single
"Numb"	2022	Non-album single
"The Game"	2022	Non-album single
"London Town"	2022	Non-album single
"Never Enough"	2023	You Had To Be Here EP
"Name Out Your Mouth"	2023	Non-album single

==== as featured artist ====
Title	Year	Album
"Games" (TCTS featuring KStewart)	2014	Games EP
"Last All Night (Koala)" (Oliver Heldens featuring KStewart)	2014	Non-album single
"Everybody Feeling Something" (Marlon Roudette featuring KStewart)	2015	Non-album single
"Paradise" (Matoma and Sean Paul featuring KStewart)	2016	Hakuna Matoma
"Innocent" (Ryan Ashley featuring Kate Stewart)	2019	INNOCENT EP
"Heartbreaaak" (featuring Kate Stewart)	2020	An Invitation to the Cookout
"Dance" (featuring Candice Boyd, Kate Stewart, Sharaya J)	2020	An Invitation to the Cookout
"Time" (Free Nationals featuring Kali Uchis, Kate Stewart (Remix))	2020	Free Nationals (Instrumentals)
"Bedtime Poetry" (AKA Block featuring Kate Stewart)	2022	Non-album single

=== Guest appearances ===
List of non-single guest, un-credited and background appearances, with other performing artists, showing year released and album name
Title	Year	Other artist(s)	Album
"Natural"	2016	Shift K3Y	Nit3 Tales
"Deserve"	2018	Christina Aguilera	Liberation
"Fuckin' with Nobody"	2018	Total Ape, Nitty Scott	In a Haze EP
"Background"	2018	MNEK	Language
"Correct"	2018	MNEK	Language
"Dilemma"	2019	Sigma	Dilemma (DnB Remixes)
"Heartbreak song" (featuring Kim Cruse)	2020	Terrell Grice	An Invitation to the Cookout
"Cruse radio" (featuring Kim Cruse & Xavier Washington)	2020	Terrell Grice	An Invitation to the Cookout

=== Songwriting Credits ===
Title	Year	Artist(s)	Album	Credits	Written with:
"Games" (featuring KStewart)	2014	TCTS	Games EP	Featured artist/Co-writer	David O'Neill
"Couldn't Be Mine"	2016	Craig David	Following My Intuition	Co-writer	Craig David, Tre Jean-Marie, Edward Drewett
"New Religion"	2018	MAAD	Non-album single	Co-writer	Natasha Ferguson, Daniel Traynor, Chiara Hunter, Ashley Milton, Daniel Goudie
"Fires and Flames"	2018	Tinashe	Joyride	Co-writer	Tinashe Kachingwe, Joel Compass, Amanda Gosein-Cameron
"Nobody Else Gonna Get My Love" (featuring Gene Noble, George Lovett & David Simmons Jr.)	2020	Terrell Grice	An invitation to the Cookout	Co-writer	Terrell Grice
"All Night Long (Reprise)" (featuring Xavier Washington)	2020	Terrell Grice	An invitation to the Cookout	Co-writer	Terrell Grice
"Nobody Else Gonna Get My Love (Reprise)" (featuring Butta-N-BizKit)	2020	Terrell Grice	An invitation to the Cookout	Co-writer	Terrell Grice
"Livin’ My Dream" (featuring Keisha Renee & Kim Cruse)	2020	Terrell Grice	An invitation to the Cookout	Co-writer	Kim Cruse, Terrell Grice
"Fix Me a Plate"	2020	Terrell Grice	An invitation to the Cookout	Co-writer	Kim Cruse, Inayah, Candice Boyd & Terrell Grice
