= In the Dark (Purple Disco Machine and Sophie and the Giants song) =

2022 single by Purple Disco Machine and Sophie and the Giants

Single by Purple Disco Machine and Sophie and the Giants

from the album Exotica
- Released: 21 January 2022
- Genre: Nu-disco
- Length: 3:05 (single version); 5:20 (extended remix)
- Label: Sweat It Out
- Songwriters: Tino Schmidt; Sophie Scott; Dimitri Tikovoi; Ed Cousens; José Coelho; Olivia Sebastianelli; Ryan Sewell
- Producer: Purple Disco Machine

Purple Disco Machine singles chronology
| "Rise" (2021) | "In the Dark" (2022) | "Twisted Mind" (2022) |

Music video
- "In the Dark" on YouTube

"In the Dark" is a song by German DJ and producer Purple Disco Machine and English group Sophie and the Giants. It was released on 21 January 2022, as a single from the deluxe edition of Purple Disco Machine's second studio album, Exotica. The track marks the second collaboration between the two acts following the hit single "Hypnotized" in 2020.

== Background ==
Creation of the track was spurred by the success of their previous collaboration on "Hypnotized". Schmidt announced the track on his social media on 10 January 2022.

== Composition ==
"In the Dark" was described as a "danceable track" paired with Purple Disco Machine's signature "deep-funk sound". Lyrically, it deals with a failed relationship. The song is written in the key of G♭ minor, with a tempo of 116 beats per minute.

== Music video ==
The video was released on 21 January 2022 and was directed by Dimitri Tsvetkov. It takes place at Café Keese in Berlin and tells the story of an illegal love affair, surrounded by spies and intelligence services.

== Track listing ==
- Digital download and streaming
1. "In the Dark" – 3:05
2. "In the Dark" (extended mix) – 5:19
3. "In the Dark" (club dub mix) – 5:04
- Digital download and streaming – Oliver Heldens remix
1. "In the Dark" (Oliver Heldens remix) – 4:27
- Digital download and streaming – Ron Basejam remix
1. "In the Dark" (Ron Basejam remix) – 6:16
2. "In the Dark" (Ron Basejam dub mix) – 8:54

== Charts ==
=== Weekly charts ===
2022–2023 weekly chart performance for "In the Dark"
| Chart (2022–2023) | Peak position |
|---|---|
| Austria (Ö3 Austria Top 40) | 26 |
| Belarus Airplay (TopHit) | 1 |
| Belgium (Ultratop 50 Flanders) | 4 |
| Belgium (Ultratop 50 Wallonia) | 3 |
| Bulgaria Airplay (PROPHON) | 1 |
| CIS Airplay (TopHit) | 1 |
| Croatia International Airplay (Top lista) | 3 |
| Estonia Airplay (Radiomonitor) | 8 |
| France (SNEP) | 76 |
| Germany (GfK) | 12 |
| Germany Airplay (BVMI) | 1 |
| Hungary (Dance Top 40) | 30 |
| Hungary (Rádiós Top 40) | 2 |
| Hungary (Single Top 40) | 9 |
| Iceland (Tónlistinn) | 34 |
| Italy (FIMI) | 68 |
| Kazakhstan Airplay (TopHit) | 32 |
| Latvia Airplay (Radiomonitor) | 2 |
| Lithuania (AGATA) | 72 |
| Lithuania Airplay (Radiomonitor) | 1 |
| Malta Airplay (Radiomonitor) | 20 |
| Netherlands (Dutch Top 40) | 3 |
| Netherlands (Single Top 100) | 25 |
| North Macedonia Airplay (Radiomonitor) | 4 |
| Poland Airplay (ZPAV) | 2 |
| Romania Airplay (TopHit) | 142 |
| Russia Airplay (TopHit) | 1 |
| San Marino Airplay (SMRTV Top 50) | 9 |
| Serbia Airplay (Radiomonitor) | 8 |
| Slovakia Airplay (ČNS IFPI) | 6 |
| Slovenia Airplay (Radiomonitor) | 4 |
| Switzerland (Schweizer Hitparade) | 40 |
| Ukraine Airplay (TopHit) | 5 |
| US Hot Dance/Electronic Songs (Billboard) | 37 |

2024 weekly chart performance for "In the Dark"
| Chart (2024) | Peak position |
|---|---|
| Belarus Airplay (TopHit) | 45 |
| CIS Airplay (TopHit) | 61 |
| Estonia Airplay (TopHit) | 171 |
| Kazakhstan Airplay (TopHit) | 59 |
| Lithuania Airplay (TopHit) | 70 |
| Russia Airplay (TopHit) | 76 |
| Ukraine Airplay (TopHit) | 53 |

2025 weekly chart performance for "In the Dark"
| Chart (2025) | Peak position |
|---|---|
| Belarus Airplay (TopHit) | 45 |
| Estonia Airplay (TopHit) | 88 |
| Kazakhstan Airplay (TopHit) | 89 |
| Lithuania Airplay (TopHit) | 96 |

=== Monthly charts ===
Monthly chart performance for "In the Dark"
| Chart (2022–2023) | Peak position |
|---|---|
| Belarus Airplay (TopHit) | 2 |
| CIS Airplay (TopHit) | 1 |
| Kazakhstan Airplay (TopHit) | 37 |
| Russia Airplay (TopHit) | 1 |
| Ukraine Airplay (TopHit) | 11 |

=== Year-end charts ===
2022 year-end chart performance for "In the Dark"
| Chart (2022) | Position |
|---|---|
| Austria (Ö3 Austria Top 40) | 59 |
| Belgium (Ultratop 50 Flanders) | 11 |
| Belgium (Ultratop 50 Wallonia) | 22 |
| CIS Airplay (TopHit) | 1 |
| Germany (Official German Charts) | 45 |
| Hungary (Rádiós Top 40) | 19 |
| Hungary (Single Top 40) | 29 |
| Netherlands (Dutch Top 40) | 13 |
| Netherlands (Single Top 100) | 83 |
| Poland (ZPAV) | 8 |
| Russia Airplay (TopHit) | 1 |
| Switzerland (Schweizer Hitparade) | 75 |
| Ukraine Airplay (TopHit) | 50 |

2023 year-end chart performance for "In the Dark"
| Chart (2023) | Position |
|---|---|
| Belarus Airplay (TopHit) | 20 |
| CIS Airplay (TopHit) | 31 |
| Hungary (Dance Top 40) | 94 |
| Hungary (Rádiós Top 40) | 4 |
| Kazakhstan Airplay (TopHit) | 37 |
| Russia Airplay (TopHit) | 53 |
| Ukraine Airplay (TopHit) | 19 |

2024 year-end chart performance for "In the Dark"
| Chart (2024) | Position |
|---|---|
| Belarus Airplay (TopHit) | 55 |
| CIS Airplay (TopHit) | 186 |
| Hungary (Rádiós Top 40) | 49 |
| Lithuania Airplay (TopHit) | 78 |

2025 year-end chart performance for "In the Dark"
| Chart (2025) | Position |
|---|---|
| Belarus Airplay (TopHit) | 64 |
| Lithuania Airplay (TopHit) | 74 |

== Certifications ==
Certifications for "In the Dark"
| Region | Certification | Certified units/sales |
|---|---|---|
| Austria (IFPI Austria) | Platinum | 30,000^{‡} |
| France (SNEP) | Platinum | 200,000^{‡} |
| Germany (BVMI) | Gold | 200,000^{‡} |
| Hungary (MAHASZ) | 2× Platinum | 8,000^{‡} |
| Italy (FIMI) | Platinum | 100,000^{‡} |
| Poland (ZPAV) | Platinum | 50,000^{‡} |
| Switzerland (IFPI Switzerland) | Gold | 10,000^{‡} |
^{‡} Sales+streaming figures based on certification alone.
