= Think Like a Man (song) =

Single by Jennifer Hudson and Ne-Yo featuring Rick Ross

from the album Think Like a Man
- Released: January 13, 2012
- Recorded: 2011
- Genre: R&B
- Length: 4:01
- Label: Epic
- Songwriters: Rick Ross; Ne-Yo; Harmony Samuels; Al Sherrod Lambert; Courtney Harrell; Eric Bellinger
- Producer: Harmony Samuels

Jennifer Hudson singles chronology
| "I Got This" (2011) | "Think Like a Man" (2012) | "I Can't Describe (The Way I Feel)" (2013) |

Ne-Yo singles chronology
| "Give Me Everything" (2011) | "Think Like a Man" (2012) | "Turn All the Lights On" (2012) |

Rick Ross singles chronology
| "I Love My Bitches" (2011) | "Think Like a Man" (2012) | "Take It to the Head" (2012) |

"Think Like a Man" is a song by American singers Jennifer Hudson and Ne-Yo, featuring American rapper Rick Ross. It was released on January 13, 2012, through Epic Records, and served as the lead single from the soundtrack to the American romantic comedy film, Think Like a Man (2012).

== Critical reception ==
Trent Fitzgerald of PopCrush described "Think Like a Man" as "a great R&B ballad that every woman and man can relate to", noting the artists' complementary vocal performances and Ross' "obligatory" rap verse. Devin Lazerine of Rap-Up referred to the song as a "breakup tune" on which Hudson and Ne‑Yo "keep it real", and observed that Ross' contribution adds imagery of "spoiling his girl with the finer things". DJBooth noted that over Harmony Samuels' "lush boardwork", the song finds Hudson "attempting to get into the head of the opposite sex", with Ne‑Yo's tenor and Ross' closing verse completing the collaboration. Singersroom characterized the track as an "empowering anthem" that encourages listeners to "take control of their lives". Writing for HotNewHipHop, Rose Lilah described the song as "[a] worthy addition to the impressive body of work [Hudson] has been developing over the years."

== Music video ==
The official music video for "Think Like a Man" was directed by Chris Robinson and premiered on February 28, 2012 on BET's 106 & Park and VEVO. Set in a sleek office environment, the video opens with comedian Kevin Hart attempting to flirt with Hudson in her executive role. Hudson-dressed in a pencil skirt-performs choreographed moves as she delivers the first verses. Ne‑Yo appears midway through in a tailored suit, joining Hudson's narrative, and Rick Ross delivers his rap verse wearing Cazal sunglasses and a snakeskin‑lined hoodie.

Essence's Whitney Gaspard highlighted Hudson's "impressive footwork" and "sharp wardrobe choices" within the corporate‑chic setting, and noted that the video's cameos by Hart and Ross effectively tie the visuals to the movie's promotional campaign.

== Charts ==
| Chart (2012) | Peak position |
|---|---|
| US Billboard Hot 100 | 90 |
| US Hot R&B/Hip-Hop Songs (Billboard) | 33 |
