= Natalie La Rose =

- Born: Natalie Delia Louise La Rose; 11 July 1988 (age 38); Amsterdam, North Holland, Netherlands
- Genre: R&B
- Occupations: Singer; DJ; songwriter; dancer; philanthropist
- Years active: 2010–present
- Labels: Global Sound; Dreams World; Sony; International Music Group; Republic; Interscope
- Website: natalielarose.com

Natalie Delia Louise La Rose (born 11 July 1988) is a Dutch singer, songwriter, and dancer who is best known for her 2015 song "Somebody". In 2013, she signed a recording contract with American rapper Flo Rida's International Music Group imprint and Republic Records.

== Early life and education ==
La Rose was born in Amsterdam, the Netherlands. Her parents are of Surinamese ancestry. La Rose has a sister, with whom she would dance and sing during her childhood. She also has two older brothers, who are not dancers nor singers. La Rose graduated in 2008 at the Lucia Marthas Dance Academy in Amsterdam, where she had studied singing and dancing.

== Career ==
=== 2010–2013: Career beginnings ===
At the age of 22, La Rose moved to Los Angeles, California, to become a singer and dancer. She explained: "I didn't feel like I was getting anywhere in the Netherlands. I'd always had this belief that America was the place to be for me."

In 2010, La Rose got her first opportunity when she signed a deal with Aaliyah's former label Blackground Records, while being distributed by Interscope Records, as part of a musical duo named Amsterdam with dancer Sigourney Korper, who debuted in the music video for label mate J. Lewis and Flo Rida's "Dancing for Me". However, she says of this situation: "The group didn't work out, and no music was released. It just wasn't the right time."

In 2011, La Rose appeared as the leading female dancer in Lloyd's "Dedication to My Ex (Miss That)". In the same year, while at an ESPY Awards after party, she went up to Flo Rida and told him that she was going to work with him one day. Impressed with La Rose's confidence, the multi-platinum international superstar invited her to the studio. Over the next two years, she performed with Flo Rida around the world.

In 2013, La Rose officially signed a deal with his International Music Group (IMG) label and Republic Records.

=== 2015–present: Breakthrough with "Somebody" and later work ===
On January 6, 2015, she released her debut single, "Somebody" (featuring Jeremih). "Somebody" peaked at No. 2 on the Official UK Singles Chart, No. 10 on the US Billboard Hot 100 and No. 12 on the Australian ARIA Singles Chart. On 24 April 2015, it was announced that La Rose will accompany Debby Ryan and Bea Miller as opening acts for the summer leg of Fifth Harmony's Reflection Tour, which began on 15 July in Louisville, Kentucky. On 2 June 2015, she released her second single, "Around the World" (featuring Fetty Wap), produced by Max Martin. The song was written by Marco Borrero, Ilya Salmanzadeh, Martin, Savan Kotecha, Rickard Goransson, DJ Frank E, and Fetty Wap. An accompanying music video for "Around the World" premiered on 24 July 2015.

In May 2022, La Rose released "Tables", her first single in seven years. The song was released under Global Sound Entertainment, indicating that La Rose was no longer signed to Republic Records.

On October 16, 2024, she released her debut EP 2 Sides of a Rose.

== Artistry ==
=== Influences ===
La Rose cites Aaliyah, Beyoncé, Shakira, Selena, Janet Jackson, Mariah Carey, Michael Jackson, Jennifer Lopez, Musiq Soulchild, Stevie Wonder, and Whitney Houston among her musical influences.

== Discography ==
=== Extended plays ===
List of extended plays
Title	Details
2 Sides of a Rose	Released: 16 October 2024; Formats: Digital download; Label: Natalie La Rose

=== Singles ===
==== As lead artist ====
Title	Year	Peak chart positions										Certifications	Album
Title	Year	NLD	AUS	BEL (FL) Tip	CAN	FRA	IRE	NZ	SWE	UK	US	Certifications	Album
"Somebody" (featuring Jeremih)	2015	12	12	10	22	71	28	34	68	2	10	ARIA: Platinum; BPI: Platinum; GLF: Platinum; RIAA: 2× Platinum; RMNZ: Platinum	Non-album singles
"Around the World" (featuring Fetty Wap)	2015	—	—	27	—	—	85	—	—	14	— (Note: "Around the World" did not enter the Billboard Hot 100, but peaked at number three on the Bubbling Under Hot 100 Singles chart.)		Non-album singles
"Tables"	2022	—	—	—	—	—	—	—	—	—	—		2 Sides of a Rose
"Can't Get You Out of My Bed" (with POPE (People Of Positive Energy))	2023	—	—	—	—	—	—	—	—	—	—		Non-album single
"Mood"	2023	—	—	—	—	—	—	—	—	—	—		2 Sides of a Rose
"The Way"	2023	—	—	—	—	—	—	—	—	—	—		2 Sides of a Rose
"Boys Lie"	2023	—	—	—	—	—	—	—	—	—	—		2 Sides of a Rose
"Give It All to Me"	2024	—	—	—	—	—	—	—	—	—	—		2 Sides of a Rose
"Quite Like Me"	2024	—	—	—	—	—	—	—	—	—	—		2 Sides of a Rose
"Not Nice" (featuring Benjamin Fayah and Shaye)	2026	—	—	—	—	—	—	—	—	—	—		Non-album single
"—" denotes a recording that did not chart or was not released in that territory.

==== As featured artist ====
Title	Year	Peak chart positions					Certifications	Album
Title	Year	NLD	IRE	NOR	SWE	UK	Certifications	Album
"Gypsy Woman" (Caroline D'Amore featuring Natalie La Rose)	2015	—	—	—	—	—		Non-album singles
"Worse Things than Love" (Timeflies featuring Natalie La Rose)	2015	—	—	—	—	—		Non-album singles
"The Right Song" (Tiësto and Oliver Heldens featuring Natalie La Rose)	2016	46	57	33	100	39	BPI: Gold	Non-album singles
"—" denotes a recording that did not chart or was not released in that territory.

=== Music videos ===
Year	Artist	Title
2010	J. Lewis	"Dancin' for Me" (featuring Flo Rida)
2011	Lloyd	"Dedication to My Ex (Miss That)"
2014	Flo Rida	"G.D.F.R." (featuring Sage the Gemini and Lookas)
2016	Flo Rida	"Hello Friday" (featuring Jason Derulo)

== Awards and nominations ==
Year	Award	Result	Nominated work	Category
2015	MTV Europe Music Awards	Nominated	—N/a	Best Push Act
2015	MTV Europe Music Awards	Nominated	—N/a	Best Dutch Act
2017	EBBA Awards	Won	—N/a	Netherlands

== Tours ==
Featured act

- Fifth Harmony – Reflection: The Summer Tour (2015)
