= Wombass =

2016 song by Tiësto and Oliver Heldens

Single by Tiësto and Oliver Heldens

from the album Together (DJ Mix)
- Released: 9 November 2015
- Genre: Future house
- Label: Musical Freedom; Spinnin'
- Songwriters: Tijs Verwest; Olivier Heldens
- Producers: Tiësto; Oliver Heldens

Tiësto singles chronology
"Chemicals" (2015)	"Wombass" (2015)	"Get Down" (2015)

Oliver Heldens singles chronology
"Shades of Grey" (2015)	"Wombass" (2015)	"The Right Song" (2016)

"Wombass" is an instrumental composition by Dutch disc jockeys and producers Tiësto and Oliver Heldens. It was released on 9 November 2015 in the Netherlands.

== Background and release ==
The track was revealed in live by the duo at Amsterdam Music Festival in 2015.

== Reviews ==
Garrett Smith from YourEDM affirm that "The two dance music superstars create a high-energy, future house tune that will ignite dance floors at festivals around the world. Soaring future house synths sit atop thumping kicks that give the track an undeniable groove." Bulbi from French webmedia Guettapen considers the track as "a pure future house classic, in the legacy of 'Koala' for example."

== Music video ==
The instrumental's accompanying music video premiered on 11 November 2015 on Spinnin' Records's account on YouTube.

== Track listing ==
Digital download (MF143)

1. "Wombass" - 4:00
2. "Wombass" (Extended Mix) - 4:59

2018 translucent yellow 7" vinyl

1. "Wombass" (Radio Edit) - 4:00
2. "Wombass" (Extended Mix) - 4:59

== Charts ==
Chart (2015)	Peak position
Belgium (Ultratip Bubbling Under Wallonia)	17
Belgium (Ultratip Bubbling Under Flanders)	44

== "The Right Song" ==
"The Right Song"
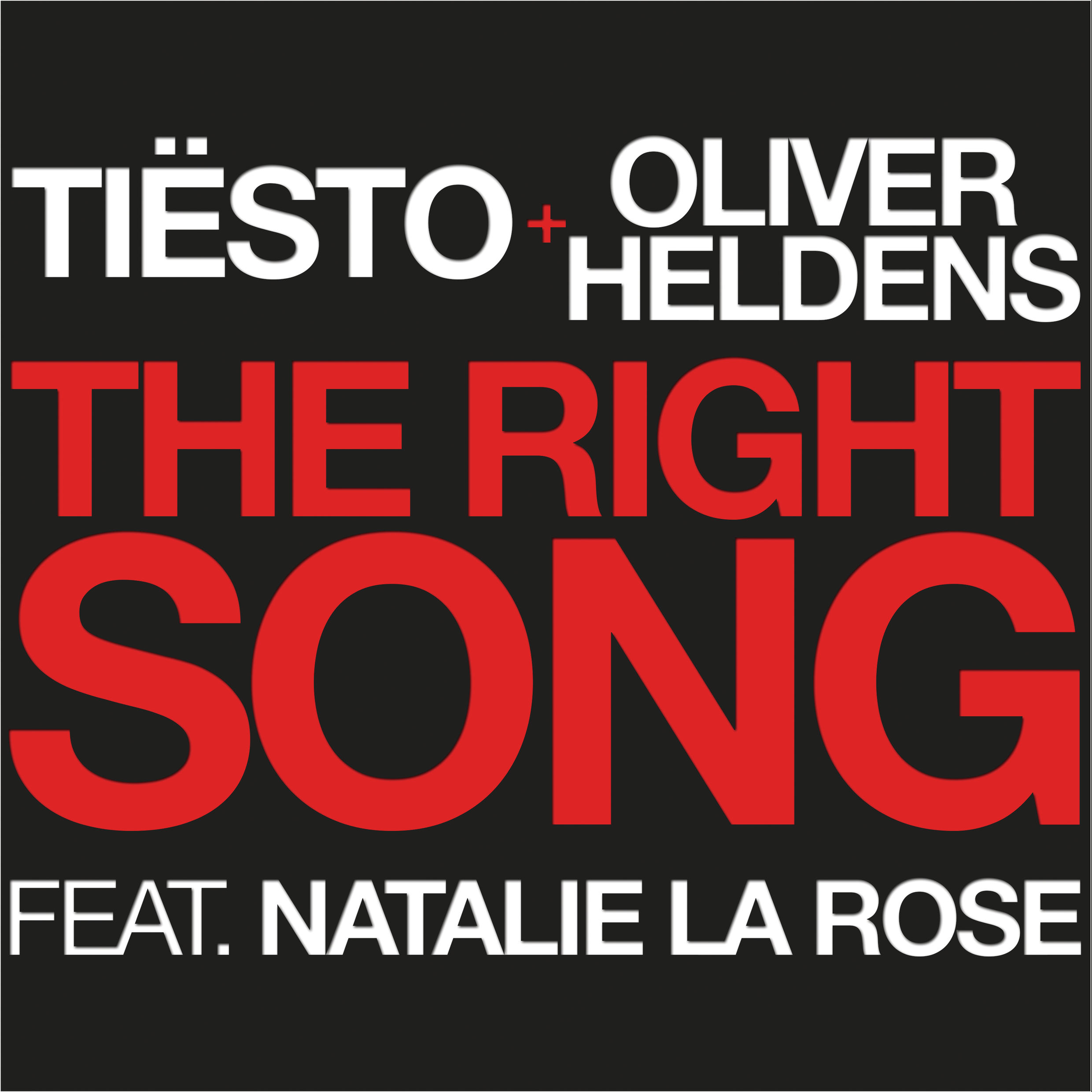

Single by Tiësto + Oliver Heldens featuring Natalie La Rose
- Released: 22 January 2016
- Genre: Future house
- Label: Musical Freedom; Spinnin'; PM:AM; Universal
- Songwriters: Tijs Verwest; Olivier Heldens; Emily Warren; Scott Harris
- Producers: Tiësto; Oliver Heldens; Chris "Tek" O'Ryan (voc.)

Tiësto singles chronology
"Get Down" (2015)	"The Right Song" (2016)	"Summer Nights" (2016)

Oliver Heldens singles chronology
"Wombass" (2015)	"The Right Song" (2016)	"Waiting" (2016)

Natalie La Rose singles chronology
"Around the World" (2015)	"The Right Song" (2016)	"Tables" (2022)

"The Right Song" is a song by Dutch DJs and producers Tiësto and Oliver Heldens, featuring guest vocals from Dutch singer Natalie La Rose. The single was released in the United Kingdom on iTunes on 22 January 2016. The single is the vocal version of Tiësto and Oliver Heldens' 2015 single "Wombass".

=== Music video ===
The song's accompanying music video which features a cleaner (portrayed by Emma Farnell-Watson) dancing in an office and with a vacuum cleaner premiered on 22 January 2016 on Tiësto's account on YouTube. Also a dance edition video was shot and released on YouTube on April 15, 2015, and it was directed by Alex Acosta.

=== Track listing ===
Digital download

1. "The Right Song" - 3:25

Digital download – remixes

1. "The Right Song" (Dillon Francis Remix) - 4:04
2. "The Right Song" (Basement Jaxx Zone Dub) - 5:41
3. "The Right Song" (Mike Williams Remix) - 4:50
4. "The Right Song" (Tom Zanetti & KO Kane Remix) - 4:44

=== Charts ===
==== Weekly charts ====
Chart (2016)	Peak position
Canadian Digital Song Sales (Billboard)	40
Ireland (IRMA)	57
Netherlands (Single Top 100)	46
Norway (VG-lista)	33
Poland (Polish Airplay Top 100)	49
Poland (Dance Top 50)	3
Scotland Singles (OCC)	18
Sweden (Sverigetopplistan)	100
UK Singles (OCC)	39
UK Dance (OCC)	10
US Hot Dance/Electronic Songs (Billboard)	22

==== Year-end charts ====
Chart (2016)	Position
US Hot Dance/Electronic Songs (Billboard)	91

=== Certifications ===
Certifications for The Right Song
Region	Certification	Certified units/sales
United Kingdom (BPI)	Gold	400,000^{‡}
^{‡} Sales+streaming figures based on certification alone.
