= Tony Junior =

Dutch DJ (born 1989)

Claessens
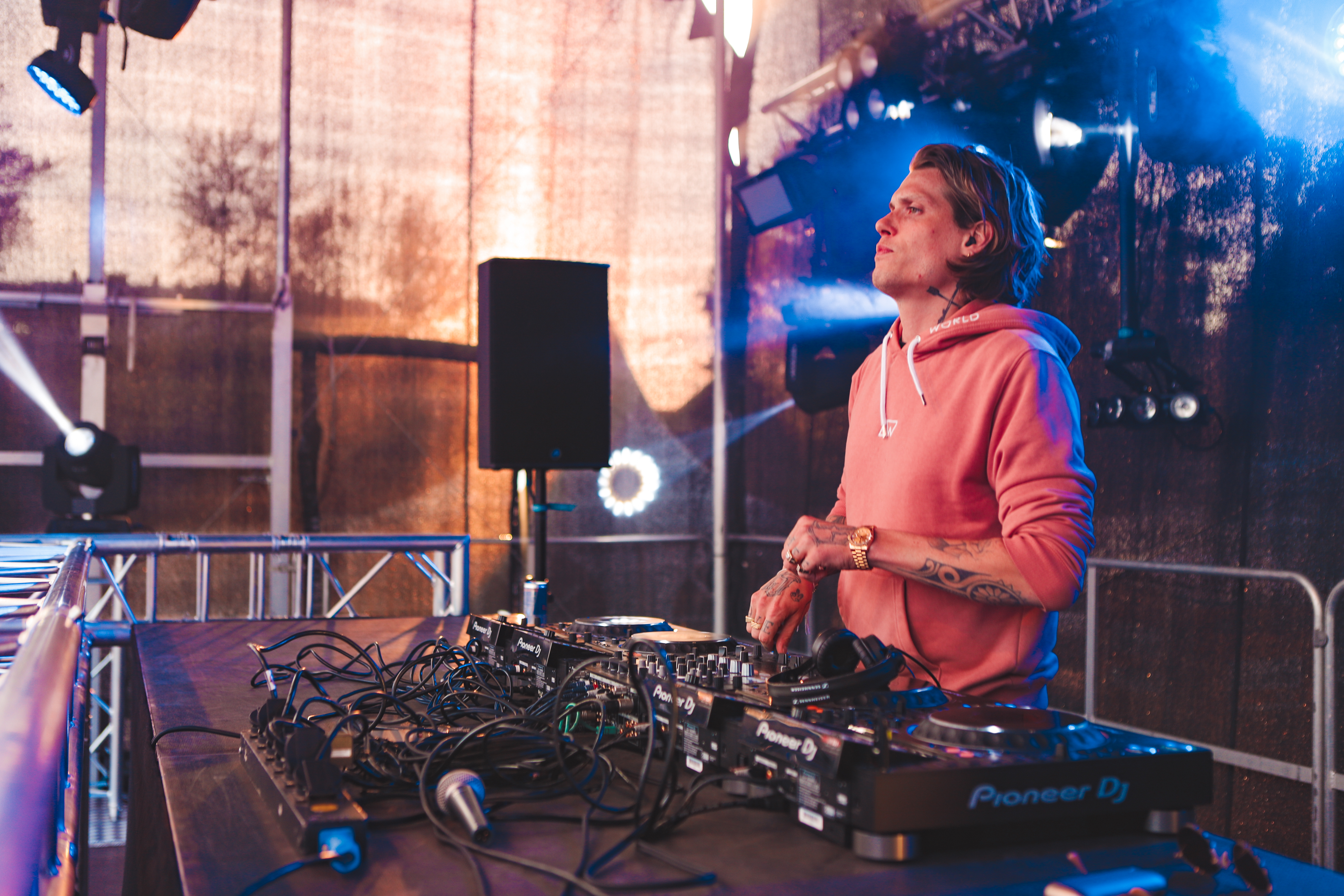
- Claessens during a performance in Emmen (2019)

Background information
- Also known as: Toni Peroni Junior
- Born: Tony Claessens; 20 October 1989 (age 37); Utrecht, Netherlands
- Genres: Electro house; progressive house; Big room house
- Occupations: Musician; DJ; record producer
- Instruments: Piano; guitar; synthesizer; drums (early)
- Years active: 2010–present
- Labels: Spinnin' Records; Musical Freedom; Doorn Records; Wall Recordings; Ultra Music
- Website: www.tonyjunior.nl

Tony Claessens (born 20 October 1989), better known by his stage name Claessens (previously Tony Junior), is a Dutch DJ and record producer from Utrecht. He has released a number of charting singles and is best known for his collaborations with DVBBS, Nervo and Tiësto.

== Biography ==
Tony Claessens was born as the son of Toni Peroni, a musician and drummer of Het Goede Doel. His mother is actress and model Linda Dubbeldeman. Junior started out as a drummer. When the band broke up, he moved from rock to house.

In 2010, his first release was the single "Loesje", in collaboration with Nicolas Nox, which reached number 2 on the Dutch Single Top 100 chart. It is a reworking of a song "Wie is Loesje?", which was released for the first time in 1939 by Wim Poppink and the Dutch jazz and dance orchestra The Ramblers. Thereafter, the duo released a remake of "Ain't Seen Nothing Yet" which reached number 55 of the Top 100.

The most success he had in collaboration with Tiësto, together they released "Get Down" in 2015.

He has appeared with his father in the reality series Toni & Tony: Zo Vader, Zo Zoon, which was shown on RTL 5 in 2015.

In March 2021 Tony Junior was announced as the Bachelor in the sixth season of the Dutch version of The Bachelor.

In February 2025 he changed his stage name from Tony Junior to CLAESSENS: after this change he completely abandoned the big room house/house sound to switch to techno/hardstyle.

== Awards and nominations ==
Year	Award	Nominated work	Category	Result
2015	DJ Mag	Tony Junior	Top 101-150 DJs	No. 119

== Discography ==
=== Extended plays ===
2016

- It's A Copy (It's A Copy, Unstoppable, F.D.A.U.) [Spinnin' Premium]

2017

- Badman (with Stuk) [Spinnin' Premium]

=== Singles ===
==== Charted singles ====
The table below shows a list of singles, years, peak chart positions and albums
Year	Title	Peak chart positions				Album
Year	Title	NLD	BEL (Fl)	BEL (Wa)	FRA	Album
2010	"Loesje" (with Nicolas Nox)	2	—	—	—	Non-album singles
2011	"Ain't Seen Nothing Yet" (with Nicolas Nox)	55	—	—	—	Non-album singles
2014	"Twerk Anthem"	—	—^{[A]}	—^{[B]}	42	Non-album singles
2014	"Immortal" (with DVBBS)	—	—^{[C]}	—^{[D]}	—	We Were Young
2015	"Love Somebody" (with Mr. Polska)	—^{[E]}	—	—	—	Non-album singles
2016	"Get Down" (with Tiësto)	—	—^{[F]}	—	—	Non-album singles
"—" denotes a recording that did not chart or was not released in that territory.

==== Non-charted singles ====
- 2010: Loesje (with Nicolas Nox) [Rodeo Media]
- 2010: Pornstar (with Nicolas Nox) [Dos Palomas Negras]
- 2011: Appeletroen [Sneakerz Muzik]
- 2011: Fitta [Confidence (Spinnin')]
- 2012: Anigav [Spinnin' Records]
- 2012: Feelin' Kinda Strange [Spinnin' Records]
- 2012: Bukkake [Spinnin' Records]
- 2013: Pawg [Tiger Records]
- 2013: Nobody Beats The Fucking Drum [Tiger Records]
- 2013: Twerk Anthem [Spinnin' Records]
- 2013: Blow Up The Speakers (Boom) (with DJ Ghost) [Spinnin' Records]
- 2014: Total Destruction (with Starkillers) [Dim Mak Records]
- 2014: Immortal (with Dvbbs) [Spinnin' Records]
- 2014: Wake Up [Dim Mak Records]
- 2014: Plur Warriors (with Baggi Begovic) [Doorn (Spinnin')]
- 2014: Break The House (with Borgeous) [Spinnin' Records]
- 2014: Jump Around (with Marnik) [Doorn (Spinnin')]
- 2015: Suckerpunch [Dim Mak Records]
- 2015: The EDM Circus
- 2015: Love Somebody (with Mr. Polska) [Spinnin' Records]
- 2015: Lightning Strikes (with Steve Aoki and Nervo) [Ultra]
- 2015: Cobra (with Dropgun) [Doorn (Spinnin')]
- 2015: King Kong (with Kura) [Wall Recordings]
- 2015: Police (with Jetfire featuring Rivero) [Doorn (Spinnin')]
- 2016: Get Down (with Tiësto) [Musical Freedom]
- 2016: Make You Go (with Riggi & Piros) [Doorn (Spinnin')]
- 2016: Facedbased [Musical Freedom]
- 2016: Walk Away (with Kura featuring Jimmy Clash) [Musical Freedom]
- 2017: Voodoo (with Pegboard Nerds) [Spinnin' Records]
- 2017: Rock N Roll (featuring Omaaj and Melody Noel) [Spinnin' Records]
- 2018: Unite (with Boombastix featuring Hoox) [Free Download/Musical Freedom]
- 2018: S4ym (with Reggio) [Spinnin' Premium]
- 2018: Don't Be Long [Source]
- 2018: Better Part of Me (with Niels Geusebroek) [Spinnin' Records]
- 2018: Kangaskhan (with Dimatik) [Smash the House]
- 2019: Speakah Wreckah (with Swacq) [Smash the House]
- 2019: Pipperdepap (with Sjaak featuring D1e Ene and Stepherd) [Armada Music]
- 2019: Technoprime (with John Christian) [Maxximize Records]
- 2020: The Lights (with Danimal) [Smash The House]
- 2020: Blow Up (with Tommy Jayden) [Maxximize Records]
- 2020: Odin (with Apaztron) [Revealed Recordings]
- 2020: Jingle Bells Rock (with Blasterjaxx) [Smash The House]
- 2020: Live Your Life (with Steff da Campo) [Spinnin' Records]
- 2021: Inception (with Isaac Palmer) [Maxximize Records]
- 2021: Burnin' Up (with Reggio) [Revealed Recordings]
- 2021: Stamina (with Ez Quew & Caneschi) [Revealed Recordings]
- 2021: We Will Never Die (with Lil Texas) [SYNPHONY]
- 2021: Breathless (with Futuristic Polar Bears & Skazi) [Revealed Recordings]
- 2022: Lambada (Your Love) (with Da Tweekaz & Sound Rush) [Dirty Workz]
- 2023: Kids (with Steve Aoki)

=== Remixes ===
- 2011: Tonique - Year (Tony Junior and Nicolas Nox Remix) [Dos Palomas Negras]
- 2012: Starkillers, Nadia Ali - Keep It Coming (Tony Junior Remix) [Spinnin Records]
- 2012: GT and Christian Luke - Begin (Tony Junior Remix) [Hussle Recordings]
- 2012: Trent Cantrelle - I Want A Freak (Tony Junior Remix) [Spinnin' Records]
- 2014: Leony! - Loving You (Tony Junior Remix) [Tiger Records]
- 2014: Qulinez and Cara Salimando - Rising Like The Sun (Tony Junior Remix) [Sprs]
- 2014: New World Sound & Thomas Newson - Flute (Tony Junior & Bryan Mescal Remix) [Sprs]
- 2015: Firebeatz - Samir's Theme (Tony Junior Remix) [Spinnin' Remixes]
- 2016: Calvin Harris and Rihanna - This Is What You Came For (Tony Junior Remix)
- 2018: The Chainsmokers - Sick Boy (Tony Junior Remix)
