= Around the World (Natalie La Rose song) =

2015 single by Natalie La Rose

Single by Natalie La Rose featuring Fetty Wap
- Released: 5 June 2015
- Recorded: 2015
- Length: 3:37
- Label: Republic; International Music Group
- Songwriters: Marco Borrero; KnocDown; Max Martin; Savan Kotecha; Rickard Göransson; Justin Franks; Willie Maxwell
- Producers: Ilya; Mag; Peter Carlsson; Max Martin

Natalie La Rose singles chronology
"Somebody" (2015)	"Around the World" (2015)	"The Right Song" (2016)

Fetty Wap singles chronology
"Trap Queen" (2014)	"Around the World" (2015)	"Save Dat Money" (2015)

"Around the World" is a song by Dutch singer Natalie La Rose. It features American rapper Fetty Wap, who co-wrote the song with its producers Marco "MAG" Borrero, Ilya Salmanzadeh, and Max Martin, with additional writing from Savan Kotecha, Rickard Goransson, and DJ Frank E. The song reached number 3 on the US Billboard's Bubbling Under Hot 100 Singles chart.

== Music video ==
The music video was released on July 24, 2015 on La Rose's Vevo account.

== Charts ==
Chart (2015)	Peak position
Belgium (Ultratip Bubbling Under Flanders)	27
Belgium Urban (Ultratop Flanders)	37
Belgium (Ultratip Bubbling Under Wallonia)	23
Ireland (IRMA)	85
UK Singles (OCC)	14
US Bubbling Under Hot 100 (Billboard)	3
US Hot R&B/Hip-Hop Songs (Billboard)	30
