= Think Like a Man (soundtrack) =

Soundtrack album by various artists
- Released: April 17, 2012
- Recorded: 2011–2012; 1974 ("That's the Way of the World"); 1981 ("Never Too Much")
- Length: 48:50
- Label: Epic
- Producers: Harmony Samuels; Phatboiz; Phil Schlemmer; Christopher T. Stewart; Soundz; Robin Hannibal; Maurice White; Jerry "Wonda" Duplessis; Christopher "Tito Justmusic" Trujillo; Lil' Ronnie; Justin Reinstein; DJ Spinz; Luther Vandross

Singles from Think Like a Man
- 1. "Think Like a Man" Released: January 13, 2012; 2. "Tonight (Best You Ever Had)" Released: January 23, 2012; 3. "Won't Make a Fool Out of You" Released: March 7, 2012

Think Like a Man is the soundtrack to the 2012 romantic comedy film of the same name. The album was released on April 17, 2012, through Epic Records, and featured contributions from Jennifer Hudson, John Legend, Ne-Yo, Keri Hilson, Kelly Rowland, Marcus Canty and Future, along with guest appearances from Rick Ross, Ludacris, Bei Maejor. Besides original songs, the album also consisted songs from Earth, Wind & Fire and Luther Vandross that was released in 1975 and 1981.

== Singles and promotion ==
The lead single from the album "Think Like a Man" performed by Jennifer Hudson and Ne-Yo was released on January 13, 2012. The second song from the album "Tonight (Best You Ever Had)" performed by John Legend featuring Ludacris and produced by Phatboiz was released on January 23. Marcus Canty's song "Won't Make a Fool Out of You" was released as a single on March 7. Kelly Rowland performed the original song "Need a Reason" with rappers Future and Bei Maejor as the featuring artists and was released on April 5. Keri Hilson's song "Freedom Ride" was released five days later.

== Critical reception ==
Stacey A. Anderson of Yahoo! News wrote "Much like the upcoming movie, the soundtrack to Think Like A Man is tale of how the opposite sexes view love, courting and relationships." A reviewer from Blackfilm.com summarized "The music of Jennifer Hudson and Ne-Yo also adds flavor to the film."

== Track listing ==
Think Like a Man track listing
No.	Title	Writer(s)	Producer(s)	Length
1.	"Think Like a Man" (Jennifer Hudson and Ne-Yo featuring Rick Ross)	Rick Ross; Ne-Yo; Harmony Samuels; Al Sherrod Lambert; Courtney Harrell; Eric Bellinger	Harmony Samuels	4:01
2.	"Tonight (Best You Ever Had)" (John Legend featuring Ludacris)	Allen Arthur; Christopher Bridges; Keith Justice; Miguel; Clayton Reilly; Legend	Phatboiz	3:59
3.	"Need a Reason" (Kelly Rowland featuring Future and Bei Maejor)	Rowland; Lonny Bereal	Phil Schlemmer	4:16
4.	"Won't Make a Fool Out of You" (Marcus Canty)	Christopher T. Stewart; Johnta Austin; Kenneth Coby	T. Stewart; Soundz	4:13
5.	"Baby Be Mine" (Quadron)	Rod Temperton	Robin Hannibal	4:17
6.	"That's the Way of the World" (Earth, Wind & Fire) (Originally released in 1975)	Maurice White; Charles Stepney; Verdine White	White	5:45
7.	"Freedom Ride" (Keri Hilson)	Hilson; Arden Altino; Olivier Castelli; Akene Dunkley; Jerry Duplessis	Duplessis	3:43
8.	"Shake That Jelly" (Billy Wes)	Patrizio Pigliapoco; Christopher "Tito Justmusic" Trujillo; William Wesson	Trujillo	3:15
9.	"Same Ole BS" (RaVaughn)	Gamble and Huff; Philip Cornish; Eric "Cire" Crawford; Kimberly Pate; Ronnie Jackson	Lil' Ronnie	3:44
10.	"Fire" (Brandon Hines)	Hines; Antoine Harris	Justin Reinstein	3:47
11.	"Motion Picture" (Future)	Future; Gary Hall	DJ Spinz	4:04
12.	"Never Too Much" (Luther Vandross) (Originally released in 1981)	Vandross	Vandross	3:50
Total length:				48:50

== Chart performance ==
Chart performance of Think Like a Man
Chart (2012)	Peak position
US Billboard 200	21
US Top R&B/Hip-Hop Albums (Billboard)	5
US Top Soundtracks (Billboard)	2
