= DJ Ghost =

- Born: Joshua Barrett
- Origin: Philadelphia, Pennsylvania, U.S.
- Genres: Hip hop, EDM, Top 40
- Occupations: DJ, Music Producer
- Years active: 1997–present

DJ Ghost (born 1981), real name Joshua Barrett, is an American DJ and music producer based in Philadelphia, Pennsylvania. He is best known as the official DJ for the Philadelphia 76ers and served as the official DJ for WWE WrestleMania XL in April 2024. He has also been a mix-show DJ on Q102 (WIOQ), a popular radio station in Philadelphia.

== Early life ==
Barrett grew up in the Philadelphia area and became interested in DJing as a teenager. He began practicing at the age of 15 in his family's neighborhood bar. Over time he honed his skills through local events and club performances.

== Career ==
DJ Ghost began gaining prominence in the early 2000s. In 2013, he joined the NBA's Philadelphia 76ers as the team's official DJ. At games held at the Wells Fargo Center, he curates music, sound effects, and player entrance tracks.

He has toured internationally, performed with platinum-selling artists including Flipmode Squad, Rampage, and Rah Digga, and holds DJ residencies in several U.S. cities. He is a mix-show DJ for iHeartRadio's Q102 in Philadelphia. DJ Ghost is also affiliated with the DJ collective Crooklyn Clan and co-founded the DJ agency Spin City DJz.

In 2024, DJ Ghost was the official DJ for WrestleMania XL, hosted by WWE in Philadelphia. He opened both nights of the event with live performances.

Additionally, DJ Ghost is the music producer for the Wawa Welcome America Festival, held annually in Philadelphia on the 4th of July. He has also performed in multiple films, such as When George Got Murdered (2022) and Abused, as well as a stint on Dance City TV (2012).

He is known for producing songs like "Airport" with Ummet Ozcan in 2013 and "Blow Up the Speakers (Boom)" with Tony Junior, also in 2013.

== Notable performances ==
- Official DJ for the Philadelphia 76ers (2013–present)
- Official DJ for WWE WrestleMania XL (2024)
- Mix-show DJ on Q102 (WIOQ)
- International tour DJ for multiple platinum artists
- Co-founder of Spin City DJz and member of Crooklyn Clan

== Awards and nominations ==
- Nominated – Mixshow DJ of the Year (Top 40/Dance), 2024 Electronic Dance Music Awards
- Nominated – Mixshow DJ of the Year (Top 40/Dance), 2025 Electronic Dance Music Awards
