= Butta-N-BizKit =

Bizkit & Butta
- Origin: Philadelphia, Pennsylvania; Los Angeles, California, United States
- Genres: Pop, R&B
- Occupations: Record producers, songwriters
- Instruments: Keyboards, Saxophone, Flute
- Years active: 2007–present
- Members: Keith "Butta" Justice; Allen "BizKit" Arthur

Bizkit & Butta is a multi-Grammy nominated, platinum selling record production duo consisting of Keith "Butta" Justice and Allen "BizKit" Arthur. Currently located in Los Angeles, the two were previously part of the Philadelphia-based production team known as "Phatboiz", along with colleague Jason "Gravy" Gottwald.

== Formation ==
Justice and Arthur first met as teenagers at the Philadelphia High School for Creative and Performing Arts, when Arthur was playing the saxophone in a jazz band there. Arthur, a saxophonist, spent much of the early 2000s performing with soul, R&B, and Hip Hop artists such as Kanye West, Chrisette Michele, Rick Ross, and eventually secured a place in John Legend's band. He also played saxophone on the Beyoncé single Déjà Vu, produced by Rodney "Darkchild" Jerkins

Justice, a pianist since the age of 8, attended Long Island University where he received a B.A. in music. Upon returning to Philadelphia, he worked as musical director for a number of artists, including Chrisette Michele

In 2010, Justice and Arthur were offered a publishing deal with Cherry Lane/BMG and Homeschool Entertainment; they subsequently produced a number of singles including the Soul Train Award-Winning and Grammy Nominated "Tonight (Best You Ever Had)", performed by John Legend, ft. Ludacris.

== Discography ==
=== Singles Produced ===
List of singles as either producer or co-producer, with certifications, showing year released, performing artists and album name
Title	Year	Certifications	Album
"Tonight (Best You Ever Had)"* (John Legend, featuring Ludacris)	2012	RIAA: Platinum; FIMI: Platinum	Think Like a Man Soundtrack
"The Thrill"* (Miguel)	2012	RIAA: Gold	Kaleidoscope Dream
"Forever Now"* (Ne-yo)			
"Derrière"* (Hamilton Park Featuring Alley Boy)	2013		
"Meant to Be"* (TLC)	2013		20
"'84"* (Ro James featuring Snoop Dogg)	2013		Cadillacs
"ISFU"* (RaVaughn featuring Fabolous)	2014		
"Who Knows" (Jovanie)	2015		What's the Move Pt. II
* denotes a recording that was produced as "Phatboiz"

=== 2010 ===
Rick Ross featuring John Legend —Sweet Life - Cut from a Different Cloth...

- Sweet Life

=== 2011 ===
Ledisi — Pieces of Me

- I Miss You Now

=== 2012 ===
John Legend, featuring Ludacris — Think Like a Man Soundtrack

- Tonight (Best You Ever Had)

Miguel — Kaleidoscope Dream

- The Thrill

Ne-Yo — R.E.D.

- "Forever Now"
- "Jealous"
- "Unconditional"

=== 2013 ===
Hamilton Park Featuring Alley Boy

- Derrière (single)

TLC — 20

- Meant to Be

Yo-Gotti featuring Ne-Yo — I Am

- Respect That You Earn

Sean Kingston — Back 2 Life

- Love Ecstasy

Ro James featuring Snoop Dogg — Cadillacs

- 84

=== 2014 ===
RaVaughn featuring Fabolous

- ISFU (single)

=== 2015 ===
SoMo — My Life II

- Make Up Sex
- On and On
- Why Wait

Jovanie — What's the Move Pt. II

- Who Knows
- Whatchu Think About

Tracy T — 50 Shades of Green

- Be Wit Me

=== 2016 ===
Eric Bellinger — Eventually

- Mean What You Say

== Awards and nominations ==
=== Grammy Awards ===
The Grammy Awards are awarded annually by the National Academy of Recording Arts and Sciences. Butta-N-BizKit have been nominated three times.

Year	Nominee / work	Award	Result
2012	"Pieces of Me" (Ledisi)	Best R&B Performance	Nominated
2013	"Tonight (Best You Ever Had)" (John Legend, featuring Ludacris)	Best Rap/Sung Collaboration	Nominated
2013	"Kaleidoscope Dream" (Miguel)	Best Urban Contemporary Album	Nominated

=== Soul Train Awards ===
Year	Nominated work	Award	Result
2012	"'Tonight (Best You Ever Had)"	Ashford & Simpson Songwriter’s Award	Nominated
2012	"'Tonight (Best You Ever Had)"	Song of the Year	Won
