= Get Down (Tiësto and Tony Junior song) =

Single by Tiësto and Tony Junior
- Released: 29 December 2015
- Genre: Bass house; melbourne bounce
- Length: 3:31
- Label: Musical Freedom; Spinnin'
- Songwriters: Tijs Verwest; Tony Claessens
- Producers: Tiësto; Tony Junior

Tiësto singles chronology
"Wombass" (2015)	"Get Down" (2015)	"The Right Song" (2016)

Tony Junior singles chronology
"Police" (2015)	"Get Down" (2015)	"Make You Go" (2016)

"Get Down" is a song by Dutch disc jockeys and producers Tiësto and Tony Junior. It was released as digital download on 29 December 2015 by Musical Freedom in the Netherlands.

== Reviews ==
Austin Evenson from the webmedia Dancing Astronaut declares that, "Implementing a barrage of blaring horns and thunderous kicks, the duo pack on whiplashing wubs to create a contrasting soundscape that ultimately fits together." According to Fabian Dori from French webmedia Guettapen, "Get Down" is "a track which doesn't matter in Musical Freedom discography but which reminds a bit to much 'Rock the Party' of Jauz & Ephwurd for the awarest ears."

== Music video ==
The music video was premiered on Spinnin' Records' official YouTube channel on 29 December 2015. It shows a little boy hearing music in his headphones and walking in a city.

== Track listing ==
Digital Download (MF149)

1. "Get Down" - 3:31

Digital download (MF149)

1. "Get Down" (Extended Mix) - 4:01

== Charts ==
Chart (2016)	Peak position
US Hot Dance/Electronic Songs (Billboard)	50
