= Somebody (Natalie La Rose song) =

2015 song by Natalie La Rose featuring Jeremih

Single by Natalie La Rose featuring Jeremih
- Released: 6 January 2015
- Recorded: 2014
- Length: 3:10
- Label: Republic
- Songwriters: Jeremy Felton; George Merrill; Joseph Khajadourian; William Lobban-Bean; Shannon Rubicam; Alex Schwartz
- Producers: The Futuristics; Cook Classics

Natalie La Rose singles chronology
| "Somebody" (2015) | "Around the World" (2015) |

Jeremih singles chronology
| "Bad Bitch" (2014) | "Somebody" (2015) | "Planez" (2015) |

Music video
- "Somebody" on YouTube

"Somebody" is the debut single from Surinamese-Dutch singer Natalie La Rose featuring American singer Jeremih. The song was written by La Rose and produced by the Futuristics and Cook Classics. It was then released for digital download on 6 January 2015.

The single reached the number one position on Billboard's Rhythmic Airplay chart in its 4 April 2015, issue. On the Billboard Hot 100, the song peaked at number ten, making it Jeremih's fourth top-ten hit and La Rose's first. The single was certified double platinum by the Recording Industry Association of America for sales exceeding 2,000,000 copies. It also charted at number two on the UK Singles Chart, and was awarded a platinum certification by the British Phonographic Industry. In Australia, the song peaked at number 12 and was certified platinum, denoting sales exceeding 70,000 copies.

The accompanying music video, directed by Luke Gilford, was uploaded to La Rose's Vevo account on 13 February 2015. It features La Rose leading her dancers in front of an old mansion while also singing the song in a garden with a rose-covered fence and statues with strange lighting, with intercut scenes of Jeremih singing his part.

== Background and composition ==
The song contains interpolations of Whitney Houston's 1987 hit "I Wanna Dance with Somebody (Who Loves Me)", "Do You Really Wanna Know" by Lillix written by Marcel Albert, and "Shots" by LMFAO and Lil Jon. La Rose explained how the song came about: "We had the whole song except for the hook. Hours later, Flo all of a sudden was like, 'I wanna rock with somebody!' And we were like, 'Yes! That's the moment we've been waiting for, it all makes sense.'" She also said: "We had this idea to base a song around Whitney’s first big hit, I Wanna Dance With Somebody. Getting permission to use a sample was pretty difficult. We were in the process of creating the song in Miami when Jeremih was there doing a Big Dreams for Kids Back to School event. Flo invited him to add a rap to the track and he nailed it on the first take. There was no grand plan to get Jeremih involved. He just happened to be in Miami at the right time. His rap adds that extra something which makes the track really special."

== Track listing ==
Digital download – single
| No. | Title | Length |
|---|---|---|
| 1. | "Somebody" (featuring Jeremih) | 3:09 |

Digital download – The Remixes
| No. | Title | Length |
|---|---|---|
| 1. | "Somebody" (featuring Jeremih) (Imanos And Gramercy Remix) | 3:21 |
| 2. | "Somebody" (featuring Jeremih) (Kasche Remix) | 3:03 |
| 3. | "Somebody" (featuring Jeremih) (Caroline D’Amore Remix) | 3:55 |
| 4. | "Somebody" (featuring Jeremih) (Modern Machines Remix) | 4:08 |
| 5. | "Somebody" (featuring Jeremih) (Dawin Remix) | 3:44 |
| 6. | "Somebody" (featuring Jeremih) (Gazzo Remix) | 4:52 |

== Remix ==
The official remix was released on 8 April 2015. It features original collaborator Jeremih and new verses from rappers Fetty Wap, Sage the Gemini and Troy Ave. There is also another remix, called the "Young California Remix", that features original vocals from singer Jeremih and the vocals of rapper Sage the Gemini and The Kid Ryan.

== Charts ==
=== Weekly charts ===
| Chart (2015) | Peak position |
|---|---|
| Australia (ARIA) | 12 |
| Belgium (Ultratip Bubbling Under Flanders) | 10 |
| Belgium Urban (Ultratop Flanders) | 22 |
| Belgium (Ultratip Bubbling Under Wallonia) | 4 |
| Canada Hot 100 (Billboard) | 22 |
| Denmark (Tracklisten) | 34 |
| France (SNEP) | 71 |
| Germany (GfK) | 60 |
| Hungary (Stream Top 40) | 25 |
| Ireland (IRMA) | 28 |
| Netherlands (Dutch Top 40) | 12 |
| Netherlands (Single Top 100) | 17 |
| New Zealand (Recorded Music NZ) | 34 |
| Scottish Singles Sales (Official Charts) | 3 |
| South Africa (EMA) | 7 |
| Sweden (Sverigetopplistan) | 68 |
| UK Singles (Official Charts) | 2 |
| UK Hip Hop/R&B (Official Charts) | 1 |
| US Billboard Hot 100 | 10 |
| US Hot R&B/Hip-Hop Songs (Billboard) | 5 |
| US Adult Pop Airplay (Billboard) | 26 |
| US Dance Airplay (Billboard) | 2 |
| US Pop Airplay (Billboard) | 3 |
| US Rhythmic Airplay (Billboard) | 1 |

=== Year-end charts ===
| Chart (2015) | Position |
|---|---|
| Australia (ARIA) | 85 |
| Australia Urban (ARIA) | 15 |
| Canada (Canadian Hot 100) | 87 |
| Denmark (Tracklisten) | 92 |
| Netherlands (Dutch Top 40) | 60 |
| Netherlands (Single Top 100) | 48 |
| UK Singles (Official Charts Company) | 83 |
| US Billboard Hot 100 | 41 |
| US Dance/Mix Show Airplay (Billboard) | 23 |
| US Hot R&B/Hip-Hop Songs (Billboard) | 12 |
| US Mainstream Top 40 (Billboard) | 27 |
| US Rhythmic (Billboard) | 3 |

== Release history ==
Release history for "Somebody"
| Region | Date | Format(s) | Label(s) | Ref. |
|---|---|---|---|---|
| Various | 2 January 2015 | Digital download; streaming | Republic | |
| United States | 3 February 2015 | Rhythmic contemporary radio | Republic | |
| United States | 10 February 2015 | Contemporary hit radio | Republic | |
| Italy | 17 April 2015 | Radio airplay | Universal Music Italy | |

== Certifications ==
| Region | Certification | Certified units/sales |
|---|---|---|
| Australia (ARIA) | Platinum | 70,000^{^} |
| Brazil (Pro-Música Brasil) | Gold | 30,000^{‡} |
| Denmark (IFPI Danmark) | Gold | 30,000^{^} |
| Italy (FIMI) | Gold | 25,000^{‡} |
| New Zealand (RMNZ) | Platinum | 30,000^{‡} |
| Sweden (GLF) | Platinum | 40,000^{‡} |
| United Kingdom (BPI) | Platinum | 600,000^{‡} |
| United States (RIAA) | 2× Platinum | 2,000,000 |
^{^} Shipments figures based on certification alone.^{‡} Sales+streaming figures based on certification alone.
