= Chemicals (Tiësto and Don Diablo song) =

Single by Tiësto and Don Diablo featuring Thomas Troelsen

from the album Together (DJ Mix)
- Released: 21 September 2015
- Genre: Future house
- Length: 3:42
- Label: Musical Freedom; Spinnin'
- Songwriters: Thomas Troelsen; Tijs Verwest; Martijn van Sonderen; Thijs de Vlieger; Nik Roos; Don Pepijn Schipper

Tiësto singles chronology
"Split (Only U)" (2015)	"Chemicals" (2015)	"Wombass" (2015)

Don Diablo singles chronology
"On My Mind" (2015)	"Chemicals" (2015)	"Got the Love" (2015)

Thomas Troelsen production chronology
We Wanna (2015)	Chemicals (2015)	Heatwave (2015)

"Chemicals" is a 2015 single by Dutch DJs and music producers Tiësto and Don Diablo. It features vocals by Danish singer and producer Thomas Troelsen and was released on Musical Freedom and Spinnin' Records. The song was released on 21 September 2015 through Musical Freedom.

== Music video ==
An official music video was issued on 23 September 2015. The video starts in Manhattan, New York City showing a normal routine of a woman in Cheongsam, a businesswoman and a Paperman, all looking bored. Tiesto and Don Diablo transform themselves into yellow and blue trails (respectively) of chemicals and fly around the city. The trails are seen by the woman in Cheongsam, businesswoman and flyer man, all of them quit their jobs and happily follow the trails to a concert where Tiesto and Don Diablo transform back to human performing.

== Track listing ==
Digital Download (MF135)

1. "Chemicals" – 4:26
2. "Chemicals" (Radio Edit) – 3:42

2018 Translucent Purple 7" Vinyl

1. "Chemicals" (Radio Edit) – 3:42
2. "Chemicals" (Extended Mix) – 4:26

== Charts ==
"Chemicals" charted in the Dutch Top 40 Tipparade chart reaching number 8. It also charted in the Belgian Ultratip chart reaching number 26 and appeared in the Swedish Sverigetopplistan reaching number 84.

Chart (2015)	Peak position
Belgium (Ultratip Bubbling Under Flanders)	26
Sweden (Sverigetopplistan)	84

== Certifications ==
Region	Certification	Certified units/sales
Sweden (GLF)	Gold	20,000^{‡}
^{‡} Sales+streaming figures based on certification alone.
