= Nina Dopamine =

American musical artist

Background information
- Born: Nian Hu; 1996 or 1997 (age 29–30)
- Origin: New York, New York, U.S.
- Genres: Pop rock; Pop-punk; Alternative rock
- Occupations: Singer; Songwriter
- Years active: 2025–present
- Website: ninadopamine.com

Nian Hu, known professionally as Nina Dopamine, is an American pop rock singer-songwriter.

== Career ==
She graduated from Harvard University in 2018 and later entered the workforce as a software engineer in New York City. Beginning her music career in 2025, she released her debut EP dopamine rush on July 10, 2026, having held her first live performance three days prior with Breaking Sound, an emerging artist showcase, in Brooklyn.

== Critical reception ==
El Herbert, writing for New Noise Magazine, praised the EP's combination of "hook-laden urgency with deeply personal songwriting". Both Herbert and Hu herself identify her musical influence from early-2000s pop rock, especially that of Avril Lavigne.

== Discography ==
=== Singles ===
- "make you weep" (2025)
- "replace me" (2025)
- "thirteen again" (2026)

=== Extended plays ===
- dopamine rush (2026)
