= Hypnotized (Purple Disco Machine and Sophie and the Giants song) =

Single by Purple Disco Machine and Sophie and the Giants

from the album Exotica
- Released: 8 April 2020
- Length: 3:16
- Label: [Columbia Records Germany]
- Songwriters: Tino Piontek; Matthew R. Johnson; Michael Kintish; Sophie Scott

Purple Disco Machine singles chronology
"In My Arms" (2020)	"Hypnotized" (2020)	"Exotica" (2020)

Sophie and the Giants singles chronology
"Break The Silence" (2019)	"Hypnotized" (2020)	"Right Now" (2021)

Music video
- "Hypnotized" on YouTube

"Hypnotized" is a song by German DJ Purple Disco Machine and British pop band Sophie and the Giants that was released on 8 April 2020 by Positiva Records. A music video for the song was released in August 2020. An acoustic rendition of the song was released in November 2020.

== Charts ==
=== Weekly charts ===
Chart (2020–2021)	Peak position
Austria (Ö3 Austria Top 40)	23
Belgium (Ultratop 50 Flanders)	9
Belgium (Ultratip Bubbling Under Wallonia)	5
Croatia (HRT)	16
Czech Republic Airplay (ČNS IFPI)	3
Czech Republic Singles Digital (ČNS IFPI)	63
Europe (Euro Digital Songs)	7
Finland (Suomen virallinen radiosoittolista)	12
France (SNEP)	61
Germany (GfK)	11
Hungary (Dance Top 40)	4
Hungary (Rádiós Top 40)	2
Hungary (Single Top 40)	6
Italy (FIMI)	2
Italy Airplay (EarOne)	1
Netherlands (Dutch Top 40)	7
Netherlands (Single Top 100)	31
Poland Airplay (ZPAV)	1
Portugal (AFP)	49
Romania (Airplay 100)	86
San Marino (SMRRTV Top 50)	6
Serbia (Radiomonitor)	4
Slovakia Airplay (ČNS IFPI)	5
Slovakia Singles Digital (ČNS IFPI)	43
Slovenia (SloTop50)	2
Switzerland (Schweizer Hitparade)	18

=== Year-end charts ===
Chart (2020)	Position
Austria (Ö3 Austria Top 40)	55
Germany (Official German Charts)	78
Italy (FIMI)	7
Poland (ZPAV)	32

Chart (2021)	Position
Belgium (Ultratop Flanders)	33
Germany (Official German Charts)	48
Hungary (Dance Top 40)	15
Hungary (Rádiós Top 40)	2
Hungary (Single Top 40)	33
Italy (FIMI)	67
Netherlands (Dutch Top 40)	37
Poland (ZPAV)	35
Switzerland (Schweizer Hitparade)	61

Chart (2022)	Position
Poland (ZPAV)	89

Chart (2024)	Position
Lithuania Airplay (TopHit)	47

Chart (2025)	Position
Lithuania Airplay (TopHit)	43
Poland (Polish Airplay Top 100)	81

== Certifications ==
Certifications and sales for "Hypnotized"
Region	Certification	Certified units/sales
Austria (IFPI Austria)	2× Platinum	60,000^{‡}
Belgium (BRMA)	Gold	20,000^{‡}
France (SNEP)	Diamond	333,333^{‡}
Germany (BVMI)	3× Gold	600,000^{‡}
Hungary (MAHASZ)	Platinum	4,000^{‡}
Italy (FIMI)	5× Platinum	350,000^{‡}
Poland (ZPAV)	3× Platinum	150,000^{‡}
Spain (Promusicae)	Platinum	60,000^{‡}
Switzerland (IFPI Switzerland)	Platinum	20,000^{‡}
^{‡} Sales+streaming figures based on certification alone.
