= Dopamine (Purple Disco Machine song) =

2021 single by Purple Disco Machine featuring Eyelar

Single by Purple Disco Machine featuring Eyelar

from the album Exotica
- Released: 27 August 2021
- Genre: Funk; pop
- Length: 3:36
- Label: Positiva
- Songwriters: Alexander Pavelich; Edvard Erfjord; Eyelar Mirzazadeh; Jenson Vaughan; Tino Schmidt
- Producer: Purple Disco Machine

Purple Disco Machine singles chronology
"Playbox" (2021)	"Dopamine" (2021)	"Rise" (2021)

Music video
- "Dopamine" on YouTube

"Dopamine" is a song by German disco and house music producer and DJ Purple Disco Machine featuring Dutch singer-songwriter Eyelar, released on 27 August 2021 as a single from Purple Disco Machine's second studio album Exotica. The song has received over 100 million streams on Spotify.

== Composition ==
"Dopamine" is a track with an "80s-disco style". It is written in the key of B minor, with a tempo of 118 beats per minute.

== Music video ==
The music video was released on 10 September 2021 and directed by James Fitzgerald. It showcases Purple Disco Machine as an eccentric scientist who "calls on his sleekly moustached 80s Californian sidekick to rescue Eyelar from 2021 with his time travelling Chevy Camaro". Video was filmed in Montenegro.

== Credits and personnel ==
Credits adapted from AllMusic.

- Edvard Førre Erfjord – composer
- Eyelar – primary artist, vocals, composer
- Matt Johnson – keyboards, synthesizer
- Monte – computer music preparation, computer vocals, mixing, voices
- Alexander Pavelich – composer, vocals (background)
- Purple Disco Machine – primary artist, producer, recording arranger, bass, keyboards, synthesizer, composer
- John Summit – remix engineer
- Chi Thanh – guitar
- Jenson Vaughan – composer
- Drew Michael – drums

== Charts ==
=== Weekly charts ===
Chart performance for "Dopamine"
Chart (2021–2022)	Peak position
Austria (Ö3 Austria Top 40)	52
Belgium (Ultratop 50 Flanders)	19
Belgium (Ultratop 50 Wallonia)	12
France (SNEP)	192
Germany (GfK)	34
Germany Airplay (BVMI)	1
Italy (FIMI)	97
Netherlands (Dutch Top 40)	25
Netherlands (Single Top 100)	48
Poland Airplay (ZPAV)	5
San Marino (SMRRTV Top 50)	4
Slovakia Airplay (ČNS IFPI)	18

=== Year-end charts ===
2021 year-end chart performance for "Dopamine"
Chart (2021)	Position
Poland (ZPAV)	90

2022 year-end chart performance for "Dopamine"
Chart (2022)	Position
Belgium (Ultratop 50 Flanders)	158
Belgium (Ultratop 50 Wallonia)	140

== Certifications ==
Certifications for "Dopamine"
Region	Certification	Certified units/sales
Austria (IFPI Austria)	Platinum	30,000^{‡}
France (SNEP)	Gold	100,000^{‡}
Germany (BVMI)	Gold	300,000^{‡}
Hungary (MAHASZ)	Platinum	4,000^{‡}
Italy (FIMI)	Gold	50,000^{‡}
Poland (ZPAV)	Gold	25,000^{‡}
^{‡} Sales+streaming figures based on certification alone.
