= Fire in My Soul =

Single by Oliver Heldens featuring Shungudzo
- Released: 26 October 2018
- Recorded: 2018
- Length: 2:55
- Label: RCA
- Songwriters: Oliver Heldens, Alexandra Govere, Oak Felder
- Producers: Oliver Heldens; Oak Felder

Oliver Heldens singles chronology
| "Riverside 2099" (2018) | "Fire in My Soul" (2018) | "This Groove" (2019) |

Shungudzo singles chronology
| "Ice Cream Man" (2018) | "Fire in My Soul" (2018) | "Weightless" (2019) |

Music video
- "Fire in My Soul" on YouTube

"Fire in My Soul" is a song by Dutch DJ Oliver Heldens, featuring guest vocals from American-born Zimbabwean singer/actress/reality television personality Alexandra "Shungudzo" Govere, who also co-wrote the single with Heldens and Oak Felder, who co-produced the track. The single is also Heldens' debut release on RCA Records, who he signed with in 2018. The track reached the top 10 on both Billboard's Dance/Mix Show Airplay (peaking at number 6 in March 2019) and Dance Club Songs charts (reaching number one in May 2019).

== Background ==
The song was inspired by their love for African music and their diverse backgrounds. In an interview with Billboard, Heldens noted "We all come from very diverse parts of the world; The Netherlands (Helden), Turkey (Felder), Zimbabwe, (and) the US (Govere was born in America, but her parents are of Zimbabwean, French, and Amerindian descent, and was raised in both countries). When we got into the studio, I told them I was very inspired by African music recently, so we started showing each other all this different African music we liked. That really got us in this vibe to create 'Fire In My Soul.'"

== Charts ==
=== Weekly charts ===
| Chart (2019) | Peak position |
|---|---|
| Poland (Polish Airplay Top 100) | 26 |
| US Dance/Mix Show Airplay (Billboard) | 6 |
| US Dance Club Songs (Billboard) | 1 |

=== Year-end charts ===
| Chart (2019) | Position |
|---|---|
| US Dance Club Songs (Billboard) | 26 |

== Certifications ==
| Region | Certification | Certified units/sales |
|---|---|---|
| Poland (ZPAV) | Gold | 25,000^{‡} |
^{‡} Sales+streaming figures based on certification alone.

== See also ==
- List of Billboard number-one dance songs of 2019
