= Oliver Heldens =

Dutch DJ and producer (born 1995)

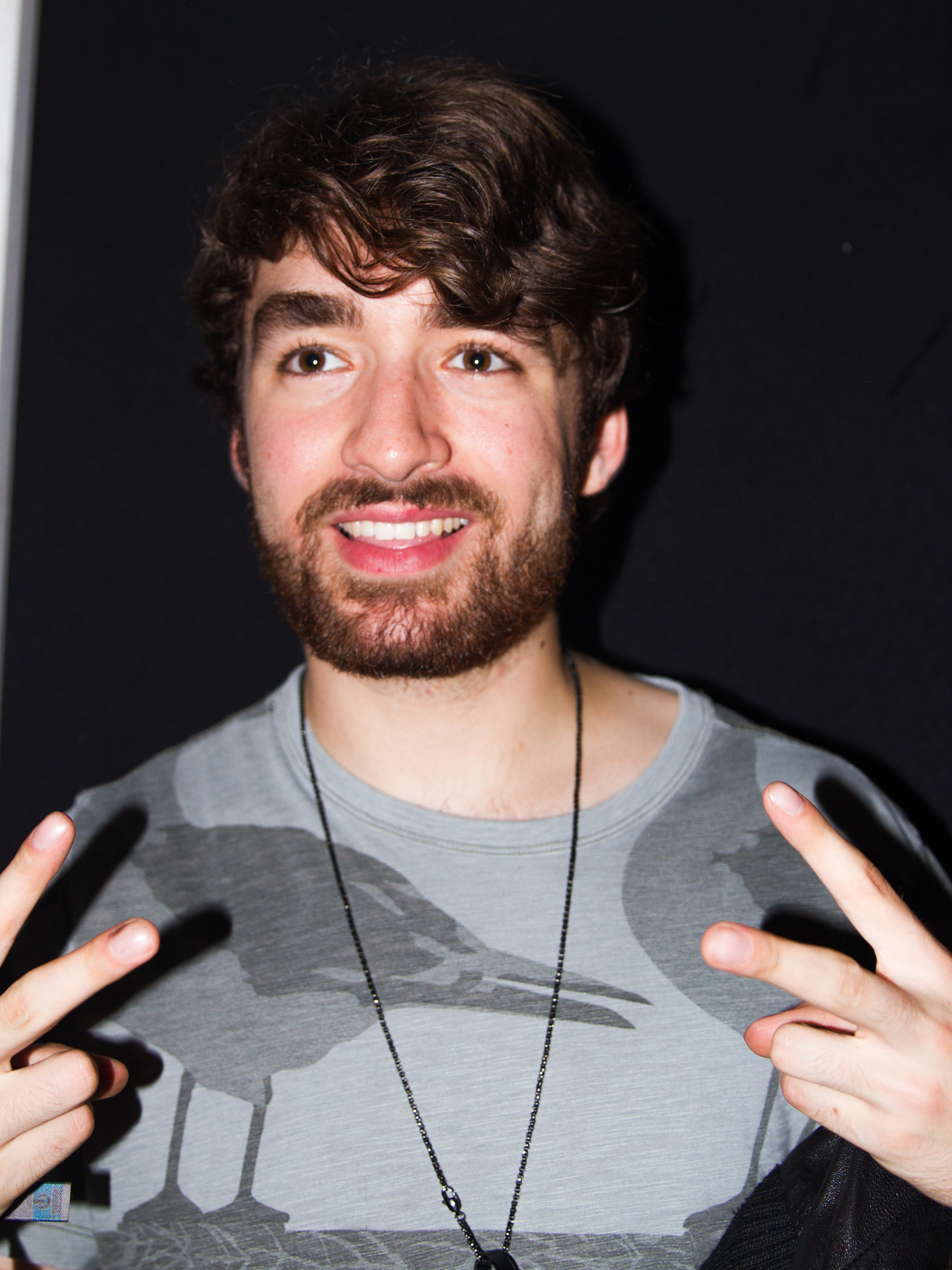
- Oliver Heldens in 2015 at Airbeat One

Background information
- Also known as: HI-LO
- Born: Olivier J. L. Heldens; 1 February 1995 (age 31); Rotterdam, South Holland, Netherlands
- Genres: Big room house; electro house; future house; deep house; tech house; progressive house; bass house; techno
- Occupations: DJ; record producer
- Years active: 2013–present
- Labels: Spinnin'; Heldeep; Musical Freedom; FFRR; RCA; Filth On Acid; Atlantic; OH2; Drumcode; HILOMATIK
- Website: oliverheldens.com

Olivier "Oliver" J. L. Heldens (Dutch pronunciation: [ˈɔlivər ˈɦɛldəns]; born 1 February 1995) is a Dutch DJ and electronic music producer from Rotterdam. He is regarded as a pioneer of the future house genre, propelling it to international attention and scoring numerous chart successes, including "Gecko (Overdrive)", "Last All Night (Koala)", "The Right Song", "Fire in My Soul", and "Turn Me On". He also produces techno songs under the alias HI-LO, which comes from "Oli H" in reversed form, runs the label Heldeep Records and later runs the label HILOMATIK. Through February 2021, he is the 460th-most-streamed artist on Spotify, with over a billion cumulative streams.

== Career ==
=== 2013–2014: debut and "Gecko" breakthrough ===
Oliver Heldens on stage in St. Louis, Missouri during his U.S. and Canada bus tour

Heldens began his professional music career when he signed to Spinnin' Records in 2013. His first releases on the label included the songs "Stinger" and "Thumper", which features DJ Jacob van Hage. Heldens' 2013 song "Gecko" caught the attention of fellow Dutch DJ Tiësto, who signed the song to his label, Musical Freedom, and later released a vocal version through Warner Music Group's FFRR with British singer Becky Hill on 23 June 2014 as "Gecko (Overdrive)". The song peaked at number 1 on the UK Top 40 chart in June 2014, was named "Essential New Tune" by BBC's Pete Tong on 31 January 2014, and DJs including David Guetta, Martin Garrix, and Zedd began supporting it.

In January 2014, Heldens launched his Heldeep Mixtape on his official SoundCloud page, creating extended mixes which incorporate various genres of electronic music including different types of deep house and tech-house. The first mixtape included his remix of fellow Spinnin' Records signee Martin Garrix's "Animals". In March 2014, Heldens also released a remix of Robin Thicke's "Feel Good".

Heldens entered the DJ Mag Top 100 of 2014, making his debut at number 34. In December 2014, he performed an Essential Mix on BBC Radio 1, and British radio DJ Pete Tong named him "one of the breakthrough producers of the year". Heldens released "Koala" on Spinnin' in August 2014, and on 6 October 2014 he released "This" with Sander van Doorn. "Koala" became the second-most-searched dance recording from the 2014 Amsterdam Dance Event on music-recognition app Shazam. He achieved 12th place in the DJ Mag Top 100 2015, making him the highest-ranked house DJ on the list. In a Billboard interview at Tomorrowland, Heldens described his style as deep house while also acknowledging the mainstream influences in his music.

On 17 December 2015, BBC Radio 1 announced that Heldens was to have a residency show starting on 22 January 2016. Since then, Heldens has played a one-hour Radio 1 slot on the third Thursday of every month.

=== 2015–2016: HI-LO and Heldeep Records ===
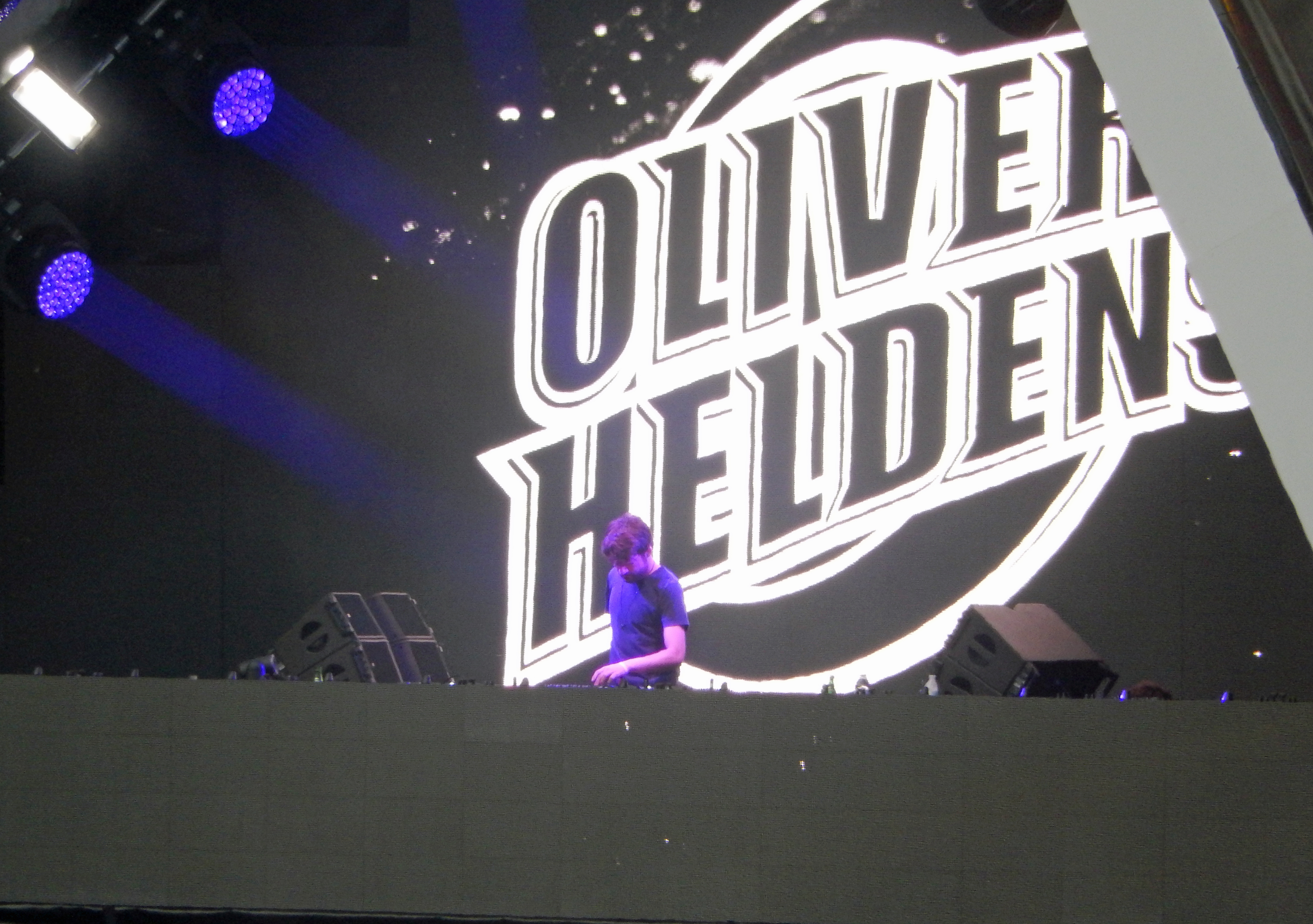
Heldens in 2015

In July 2015, the HI-LO song "Renegade Mastah" was the first track to be released on Heldens' new label Heldeep Records. In a later interview with the UKF blog, it was revealed that HI-LO was Heldens, who used the label to launch the HI-LO project. HI-LO has been called a deeper underground sound than Heldens' work under his own name. The title of the HI-LO project was chosen as a palindrome for Oli-H, to signify his name. The HI-LO tracks "Crank It Up", "Wappy Flirt" and "Ooh La La" followed, with the single "Scrub the Ground" by Chocolate Puma and Tommie Sunshine released on Heldeep Records in October 2015.

Heldens launched Heldeep Records in 2015 to create a platform to showcase the music of budding producers. Heldeep would grow from a small imprint to a fully-fledged label, signing artists including Alok, Chocolate Puma, and Dada Life. The label has hosted stages at festivals including Tomorrowland, Mysteryland, SW4, Electric Forest, Spring Awakening, Sunrise Festival, Imagine Festival, Black Sheep Festival, and label nights during Miami Music Week and Amsterdam Dance Event.

Heldeep Talent EP was released on 23 November 2015 and included the songs "I Can't Stop" by Death Ray Shake, "Hookah" by Bojac, "Slip Away" by Niko The Kid, and "Fall Under Skies" by Jonas Aden & Robby East. Since then Oliver released "Heldeep Talent EP Part 2" on 21 March 2016 Featuring three tracks: "Get Busy" by Steff Da Campo, "Lethal" by NOVKA, and "Mirrors feat. Stevyn by Tom Budin and Stevyn.

"Waiting", an Oliver Heldens and Throttle collaboration, was released on Heldeep Records on 7 January 2016. Heldeep released a track by Mr. Belt & Wezol and Shermanology called "Hide & Seek" as well as another track by Bougenvilla & Out Of Cookies called "Break It Down" on 25 April 2016. The label also released "Space Sheep," a collaboration between Heldens and Chocolate Puma on 2 May 2016.

=== 2017–2020: "Turn Me On" and other singles ===
In 2017, Heldens released the single "Ibiza 77". In 2018, he signed to RCA Records. His 2018 single "Fire in My Soul" features vocals from singer Shungduzo and was co-produced with Oak Felder. It reached number 1 on the Billboard Dance Club Songs chart, and number 18 on the Hot Dance/Electronic Songs chart. Also that year, he released a remix of Chic's "Le Freak" on Atlantic Records, to commemorate the 40th anniversary of Atlantic Records' all-time best selling song. In 2018, he partnered with the Plastic Soup Foundation as their new ambassador, to help eliminate ocean pollution.

His 2019 single "Turn Me On" with DJ Riton and singer Vula peaked at number 10 on the Global Shazam Top 200 chart, number 12 on the UK Top 40 chart, number 1 on the MediaBase Dance Radio chart, number 1 on the Billboard Dance/Mix Show Airplay chart, and number 5 on the Dance Club Songs chart. For the single, he and Riton sampled the 1982 song "Don't Go" by Yazoo. Also in 2019, Heldens released "Lift Me Up", a collaboration with Firebeatz and producer Schella, with vocals from Carla Monroe, collaborated with Nile Rodgers of Chic and Devin on "Summer Lover" "This Groove" with Lenno and released the single "Cucumba" with Moguai.

As a remixer, Heldens has released remixes for many high-profile artists, including Calvin Harris and Dua Lipa's "One Kiss", David Guetta and Anne-Marie's "Don't Leave Me Alone", The Chainsmokers' "All We Know", Katy Perry's "Chained to the Rhythm", Calvin Harris and Ellie Goulding's "Outside", Charlie Puth's "Attention", and Jamiroquai's "Superfresh".

In 2019, Heldens commemorated the fifth anniversary of his label Heldeep and the 250th episode of his weekly radio show Heldeep Radio, which is syndicated in 65 countries, broadcast on over 90 stations and reaches over 118 million people a week, with the Heldeep 5 World Tour, taking Heldens and friends across North America, Mexico, Brazil, Peru, Europe, Indonesia, Japan, and South Korea.

In early 2020, he collaborated with South Korean girl group Itzy to produce a sidetrack titled "Ting Ting Ting." In June that year, Heldens released a remix of Katy Perry's hit song "Daisies." He also released singles of his own. These include "Take A Change", "The G.O.A.T.", and, in collaboration with Mesto, "Details" featuring Boy Matthews for the vocals. Others are "Rave Machine" with Rowetta, "Break This Habit", "Freedom For My People" with Shungudzo and the single "Set Me Free" together with MAX and Party Pupils. "Set Me Free" was the first song to be released on the new Label OH2 Records, which was founded by Oliver Heldens as his second record label. OH2 Records is intended to feature more vocal house songs.

=== 2021–present: more focus on HI-LO tracks ===
2020 saw the rise of releases by HI-LO, the darker alias of Heldens. This started off with the singles "Kronos", "Zeus" and "Athena", all of which he produced himself. This continued into 2021, and he also started collaborating with new artists, in particular DJs from the techno scene. The most notable among these is Reinier Zonneveld, with whom HI-LO now collaborates a lot. This resulted in the singles "Saw of Olympus", "Existencia", "Balearic Mornings" and "String Theory". Two other singles are "Check" with Will Clarke and "HADES" with Italian DJ T78. All of these were released on the "Filth On Acid" label by Reinier Zonneveld.

HI-LO also remixed the song "Skyscrapers" by Nina Kraviz, which resulted in "Skyscrapers (Hi-Lo Remix)". Another novelty for him included the release of "Hypnos" and "Hera" on Drumcode Records. These two songs are solely produced by HI-LO and are the start of an association with Adam Beyer and his techno record label.

Heldens' singles from this year include "Never Look Back" feat. Syd Silvair, "Zapdos", and "Another Chance" with Roger Sanchez. He also remixed "By Your Side (feat. Tom Grennan)" by Calvin Harris, and OH2 Records saw its second big release by Heldens with the song "Deja Vu", which features the vocals of Anabel Englund.

In 2022, he first released a remix of the song "In the Dark" by Purple Disco Machine and Sophie and the Giants. HI-LO then released the track "Industria" with Eli Brown. In March 2022, he confirmed an upcoming single in collaboration with Tchami, again featuring vocals by Anabel Englund. He has also confirmed HI-LO collaborations with techno artists Space 92 and Layton Giordani.

Heldens is managed by Dave Frank, Alex Harrow, and Lucas Keller at Milk & Honey, and he is signed to RCA Records (Sony) and his own Heldeep Records. He is additionally published worldwide by Universal Music Publishing.

On 5 April 2023, "10 Out of 10", featuring Kylie Minogue, was released.

== Performances ==
Heldens has performed at festivals and venues including Coachella, Glastonbury, Lollapalooza, Electric Daisy Carnival, Ultra, Tomorrowland, Amsterdam Dance Event, Electric Zoo, Creamfields, Veld Music Festival, Stereosonic, Djakarta Warehouse Project, Sensation, Brooklyn Mirage, Echostage, Fabric, Governors Island, LIV, Printworks, and Red Rocks. He has held residencies at clubs in Las Vegas and Ibiza including Hakkasan, Omnia, Wet Republic, Marquee, HÏ, Ushuaïa and Pacha.

== Awards and nominations ==
Year	Organisation	Award	Work	Result
2016	Style Icon Asia	Iconic Global Producer of the Year	Himself	Won

=== DJ Magazine Top 100 DJs ===
Year	Position
2014	34
2015	12
2016	8
2017	13
2018	9
2019	7
2020	8
2021	8
2022	10
2023	19
2024	29
2025	26
