= Tonight (Best You Ever Had) =

Single by John Legend featuring Ludacris

from the album Think Like a Man
- Released: January 23, 2012
- Genre: R&B
- Length: 3:59
- Label: Columbia
- Songwriters: Allen Arthur; Christopher Bridges; Keith Justice; John Stephens; Miguel Pimentel; Clayton Reilly
- Producer: Phatboiz

John Legend singles chronology
| "When Christmas Comes" (2011) | "Tonight (Best You Ever Had)" (2012) | "Who Do We Think We Are" (2013) |

Ludacris singles chronology
| "Wet the Bed" (2011) | "Tonight (Best You Ever Had)" (2012) | "Jingalin" (2012) |

"Tonight (Best You Ever Had)" is a song by American singer-songwriter John Legend featuring American rapper Ludacris, released on January 23, 2012, through Columbia Records. Written alongside Miguel and production group Phatboiz, the song served as the second single from the soundtrack to the 2012 American romantic comedy film Think Like a Man. "Tonight (Best You Ever Had)" peaked at number 12 on the US Billboard Hot R&B/Hip-Hop Songs and reached the lower half of the US Billboard Hot 100. It reached platinum status in the United States and earned a Grammy Award nomination for Best Rap/Sung Performance.

== Track listing ==
Digital download
| No. | Title | Length |
|---|---|---|
| 1. | "Tonight (Best You Ever Had) (featuring Ludacris)" | 3:59 |

== Charts ==
=== Weekly charts ===
Weekly chart performance for "Tonight (Best You Ever Had)"
| Chart (2012) | Peak position |
|---|---|
| Italy (FIMI) | 16 |
| US Billboard Hot 100 | 79 |
| US Hot R&B/Hip-Hop Songs (Billboard) | 12 |

=== Year-end charts ===
Year-end chart performance for "Tonight (Best You Ever Had)"
| Chart (2012) | Position |
|---|---|
| Italy (FIMI) | 57 |
| US Adult R&B Songs (Billboard) | 3 |

== Certifications ==
Certifications for "Tonight (Best You Ever Had)"
| Region | Certification | Certified units/sales |
|---|---|---|
| Australia (ARIA) | Gold | 35,000^{‡} |
| Italy (FIMI) | Platinum | 30,000^{*} |
| New Zealand (RMNZ) | Platinum | 30,000^{‡} |
| United States (RIAA) | 2× Platinum | 2,000,000^{‡} |
^{*} Sales figures based on certification alone.^{‡} Sales+streaming figures based on certification alone.
