= Koala (song) =

2014 single by Oliver Heldens

Single by Oliver Heldens
- Released: 16 July 2014
- Recorded: 2013
- Genre: Future house
- Length: 4:24 (original mix) 2:48 (radio edit)
- Label: Spinnin'
- Songwriter: Oliver Heldens
- Producer: Oliver Heldens

Oliver Heldens singles chronology
"Gecko (Overdrive)" (2014)	"Koala" (2014)	"THIS" (2014)

"Koala" is a song by Dutch DJ and producer Oliver Heldens. It was released as a digital download on 16 July 2014 in the Netherlands. The song was written and produced by Oliver Heldens. The song peaked at number 42 in the Netherlands, and has also charted in Belgium.

The vocal cover of this song named "Last All Night (Koala)" was released onto YouTube on 8 October 2014 under the channel of FFRR.

== Music video ==
A music video to accompany the release of "Koala" was first released onto YouTube on 13 August 2014 at a total length of two minutes and fifty-three seconds.

== Track listing ==
Digital download
No.	Title	Length
1.	"Koala" (Radio Edit)	2:48

Digital download – Michael Calfan Remix
No.	Title	Length
1.	"Koala" (Michael Calfan Remix)	4:26

== Chart performance ==
=== Weekly charts ===
Chart (2014)	Peak position
Belgium (Ultratop 50 Flanders)	33
Belgium (Ultratip Bubbling Under Wallonia)	17
Netherlands (Single Top 100)	23

== Release history ==
Region	Date	Format	Label
Netherlands	16 July 2014	Digital download	Spinnin'

== Last All Night (Koala) ==
"Last All Night (Koala)"

Single by Oliver Heldens featuring KStewart
- Released: 7 December 2014
- Recorded: 2014
- Genre: Future house
- Length: 3:15
- Label: FFRR
- Songwriters: Oliver Heldens; Uzo Emenike; Becky Hill
- Producer: Oliver Heldens

Oliver Heldens singles chronology
"Pikachu" (2014)	"Last All Night (Koala)" (2014)	"You Know" (2015)

KStewart singles chronology
"Games" (2014)	"Last All Night (Koala)" (2014)	"Everybody Feeling Something" (2015)

Oliver Heldens released a second version of the song titled "Last All Night (Koala)" featuring guest vocals from English singer-songwriter KStewart. It was released as a digital download on 7 December 2014. It has peaked to number 5 on the UK Singles Chart.

=== Track listing ===
Digital download
No.	Title	Length
1.	"Last All Night (Koala)" (featuring KStewart)	3:15

Digital download – Remixes
No.	Title	Length
1.	"Koala" (instrumental)	4:24
2.	"Last All Night (Koala)" (featuring KStewart) (Toyboy & Robin Remix)	5:12
3.	"Last All Night (Koala)" (featuring KStewart) (LOW STEPPA Remix)	5:14
4.	"Last All Night (Koala)" (featuring KStewart) (TC4 Remix)	4:48
5.	"Last All Night (Koala)" (featuring KStewart) (Reso Remix)	4:15

=== Chart performance ===
Chart (2014–2015)	Peak position
Austria (Ö3 Austria Top 40)	67
France (SNEP)	132
Germany (GfK)	53
Scotland Singles (OCC)	6
UK Singles (OCC)	5
UK Dance (OCC)	1

=== Release history ===
Region	Date	Format	Label
United Kingdom	7 December 2014	Digital download	Spinnin'
