= Sophie and the Giants =

British singer-songwriter pop artist

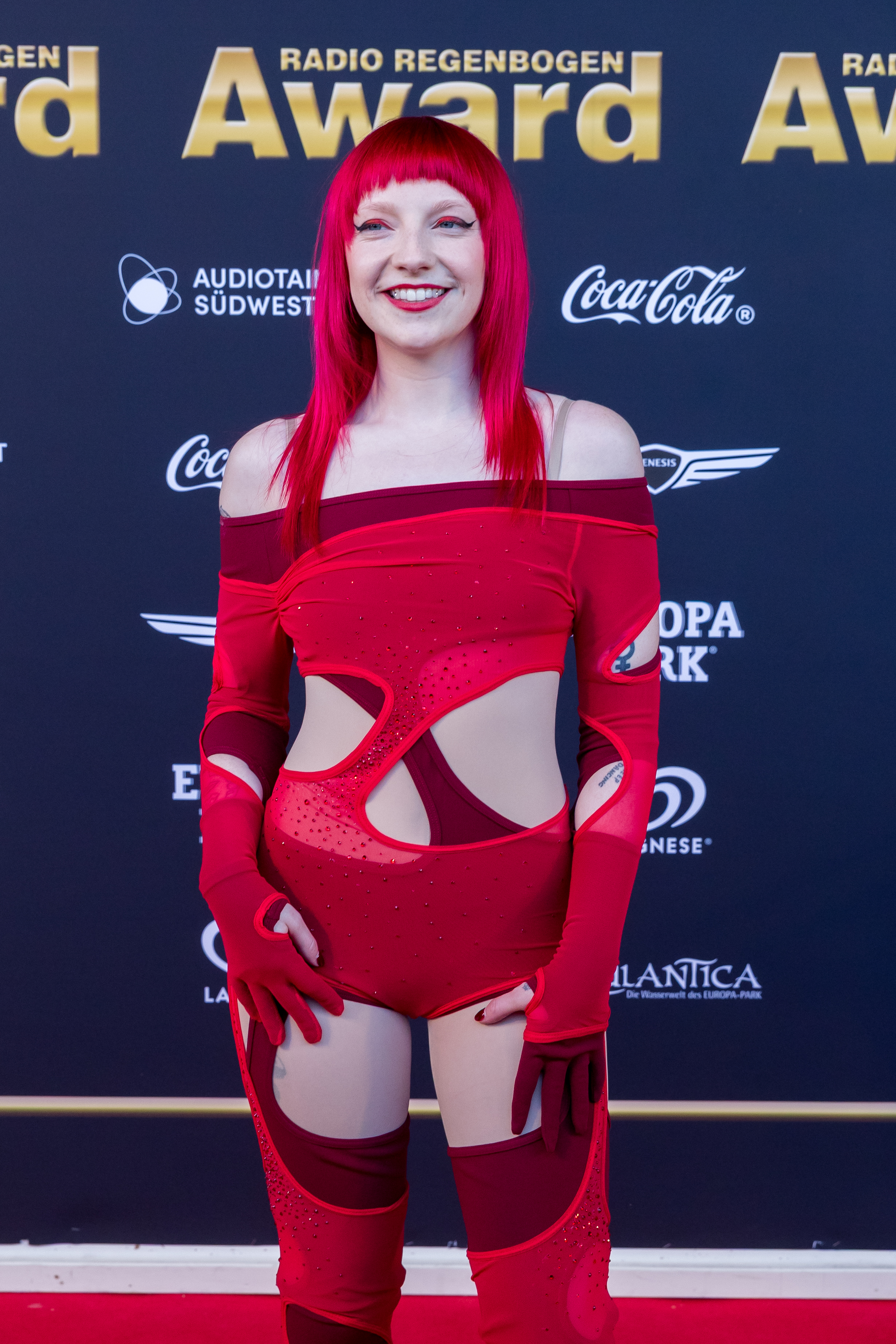
- Sophie Scott in 2025

Background information
- Born: Sophie Louise Scott; July 1998 (age 27); Staines-upon-Thames, England, United Kingdom
- Genres: Dance pop
- Years active: 2015–present
- Label: Polydor Records
- Member of: Loud LDN
- Website: www.sophieandthegiants.com

Sophie Louise Scott, known professionally as Sophie and the Giants (SATG), (born July 1998) is an English singer-songwriter from Staines-upon-Thames. In 2019, Sophie and the Giants released the single "The Light", which was used as the trailer for the Codemasters game "Grid" and by Vodafone in a German advertisement. She subsequently released the Purple Disco Machine collaborations "Hypnotized" and "In the Dark", which achieved international success. She joined Loud LDN in August 2024.

== Biography ==
Sophie began performing under her artist name Sophie and the Giants in 2015. In interviews she has explained that the project began as her own creative outlet, supported in the early years by "a revolving cast" of friends and student musicians who had their own projects and commitments. Scott has described herself as the project's sole songwriter and creative lead. After relocating to Sheffield, she released her debut single Monsters in April 2018, followed by the Adolescence EP in October, which included the songs Bulldog, Space Girl and Waste My Air.

SATG started 2019 by playing for BBC Radio Sheffield on 12 January; on 15 March, she released her new single The Light, which was chosen by Codemasters for the trailer of the then-forthcoming racing game Grid. The song was also used by Vodafone for advertising in Germany. In early June, Antonia Pooles replaced Stapledon. Later that summer, SATG played at the Reading and Leeds Festivals and at Glastonbury Festival. A new single, Break the Silence, was released in August, followed by Runaway in November, and in December SATG played again for BBC Radio Sheffield, this time live from Maida Vale Studios.

In early 2020, Sophie worked with German DJ Purple Disco Machine on the song Hypnotized, which was released on 8 April, and the sound of which was heavily inspired by the italo disco music genre. Hypnotized was very successful across Europe where it was awarded five platinum records in Italy and a diamond record in France; it was followed by the new single Right Now, released in February 2021. On 12 November 2021 Sophie collaborated with Benny Benassi and Dardust to release the single Golden Nights, which further solidified her presence in the dance music scene. In January 2022, Sophie reunited with Purple Disco Machine to release the track In The Dark on the 21st, which has since reached platinum status in five countries, including France and Italy.

Throughout 2022, Sophie continued her journey in the dance music genre and completed an EU tour with a new live setup that consisted of her and a DJ. In the same year she released We Own The Night on 19 August. In 2023, Sophie started the year off by releasing her dance song DNA featuring MEARSY on 10 March which earned itself a Gold Record, and Paradise featuring Purple Disco Machine on 16 June. In 2024, Sophie released of her new single Shut Up and Dance on 17 May 2024, which quickly climbed the German radio charts, reaching number 2. On 23 August 2024 Sophie teamed up with multi-platinum dance act R3hab to release their single All Night, which features an interpolation of the boy band Blue's hit All Rise. She joined Loud LDN later that month.

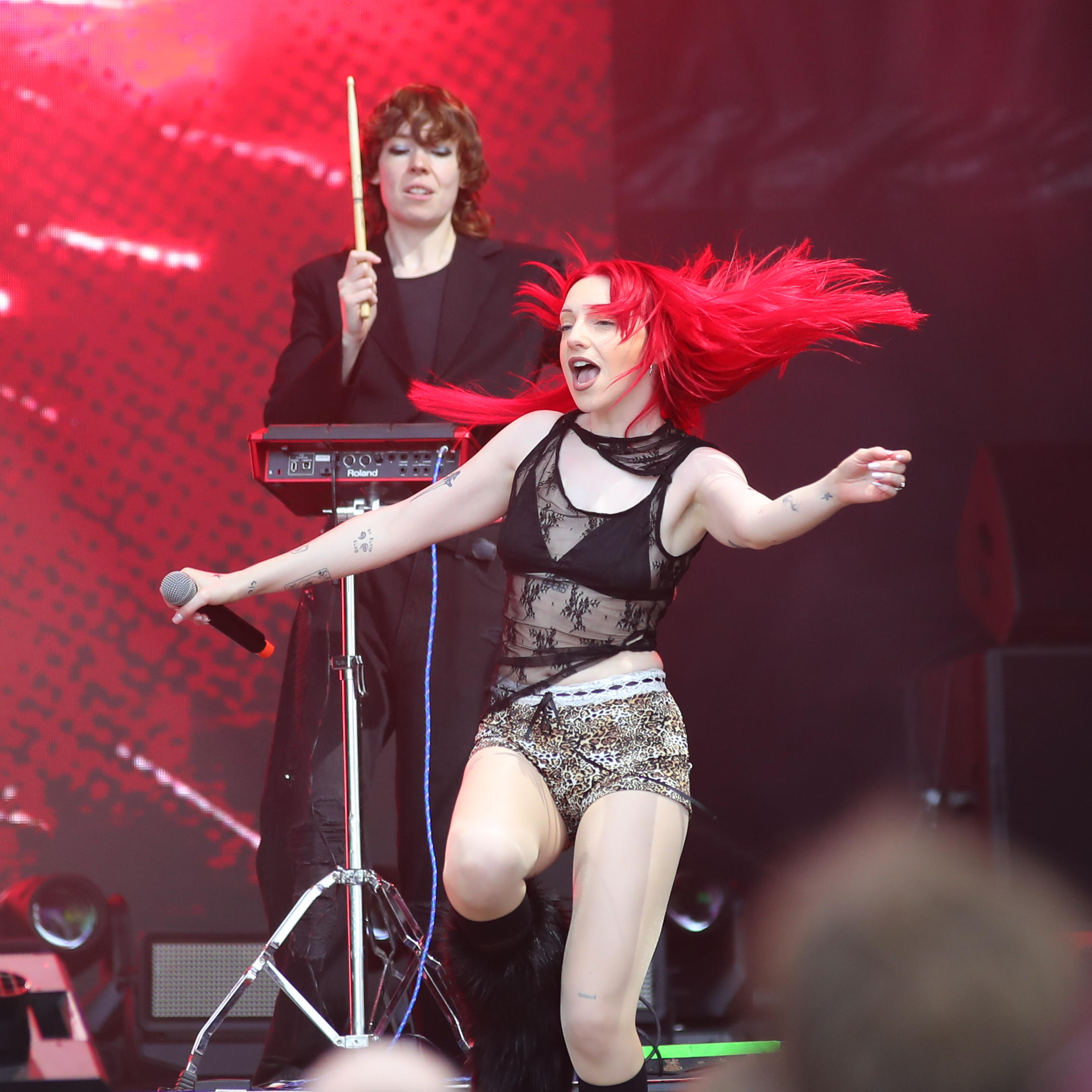
Sophie and the Giants performing at the Kiel Week 2025 in Kiel, Germany

== Discography ==
=== EP ===
- Adolescence (2018)
- 00:00 (2025)

=== Singles ===
- "Monsters" (2018)
- "Bulldog" (2018)
- "Space Girl" (2018)
- "Waste My Air" (2018)
- "The Light" (2019)
- "Runaway" (2019)
- "Break the Silence" (2019)
- "Hypnotized" with Purple Disco Machine (2020)
- "Right Now" (2021)
- "Don't Ask Me to Change" (2021)
- "Golden Nights" (2021)
- "Falene" with Michele Bravi (2021)
- "In the Dark" with Purple Disco Machine (2022)
- "We Own the Night" (2022)
- "DNA" with MEARSY (2023)
- "Paradise" with Purple Disco Machine (2023)
- "Shut up and Dance" (2024)
- "All Night" with R3hab (2024)
- "Red Light" (2025)
- "Bad Friends" (2025)
- "A Little Bit Wild" (2025)
- "Pink Champagne" (2025)
- "Loser" (2025)
