= Purple Disco Machine =

German DJ and house music producer (born 1980)

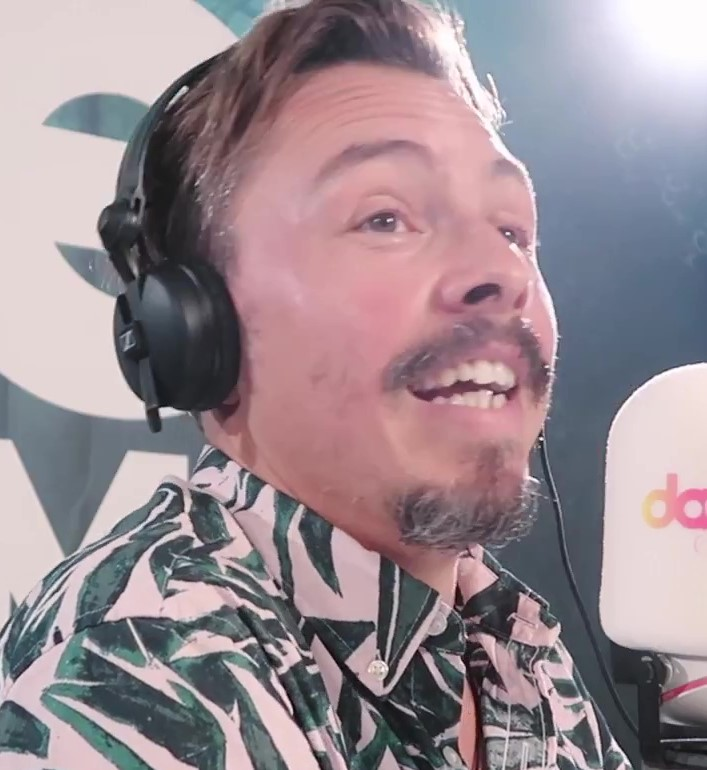
- Piontek in 2018

Background information
- Also known as: Tino Schmidt
- Born: Tino Piontek; 12 February 1980 (age 46); Dresden, Saxony, East Germany
- Genres: Nu-disco; house; deep house
- Occupations: Disc jockey; record producer; composer
- Years active: 2012–present
- Website: purplediscomachine.com

Tino Piontek (born 12 February 1980), better known by the stage name Purple Disco Machine, is a German nu-disco and house record producer and DJ.

== Early life and career ==
Tino Piontek was born in Dresden on 12 February 1980, and grew up in East Germany until 1989 when the Berlin Wall came down and both parts of Germany subsequently reunited.

In 1996, he started producing with the program Cubase and some synthesizers; at the same time he discovered house music on the Dresden nightlife scene. He became active as a DJ himself and in 2012 his first productions appeared. From then on, international DJ performances began and in 2017 his debut album was released on the label Sony Music.

He celebrated his greatest success so far in August 2020 with the song "Hypnotized", which he recorded for the vocals together with Sophie and the Giants, which peaked at number two on the Italian Singles Chart, receiving double platinum certification. In the same year, he produced official remixes of Dua Lipa's "Don't Start Now", Kylie Minogue's "Magic" and Lady Gaga's "Rain on Me". He has his own SiriusXM show on Studio 54 on Fridays called "Purple Disco Tales".

In 2023, he won a Grammy Award under the category of Best Remixed Recording, Non-Classical for his remix of Lizzo's "About Damn Time".

His album Paradise came out on 20 September 2024. Guests include Chromeo, on the single "Heartbreaker", and the French funk musician Dabeull, on "Paradisco".

== Personal life ==
Piontek lives in Dresden with his wife and two children. He is a supporter of FC Bayern Munich. His father was a record collector and introduced him to the funk music of the 1970s and 1980s.

== Discography ==
=== Albums ===
| Title | Details | Peak chart positions | | | | | | | | Certifications |
| Title | Details | GER | AUT | BEL (FL) | FRA | ITA | LIT | NLD | SWI | Certifications |
|---|---|---|---|---|---|---|---|---|---|---|
| Soulmatic | Released: 3 October 2017; Label: Sony; Format: LP, digital download, streaming | — | — | — | — | — | — | — | — | |
| Exotica | Released: 15 October 2021; Label: Columbia; Format: LP, digital download, streaming | 8 | 30 | 45 | 65 | 29 | 71 | 45 | 28 | IFPI SWI: Platinum; SNEP: Gold |
| Paradise | Released: 20 September 2024; Label: Columbia; Format: CD, LP, digital download, streaming | 11 | 15 | 26 | — | 49 | — | — | 13 | |
| Cosmotropia | Release date: 30 April 2027; Label: Columbia; Format: CD, LP, digital download, streaming | To be released | | | | | | | | |

=== Remix albums ===
| Title | Details |
|---|---|
| Club Exotica | Released: 17 December 2021; Label: Positiva; Format: Digital download, streaming |

=== Compilations ===
| Title | Details |
|---|---|
| Discotheque | Released: 19 April 2021; Label: Glitterbox; Format: CD, LP, digital download, streaming |

=== Extended plays ===
- Sgt. Killer (2011)
- Purple Pianos (2015)
- RPMD (with Robosonic) (2015)
- Tank Drop (2015)
- Walls (2016)
- Emotion (2019)

=== Singles ===
| Title | Year | Peak chart positions | | | | | | | | | Certifications | Album |
| Title | Year | GER | AUT | BEL (FL) | FRA | ITA | NLD | POL Air. | SWE | SWI | Certifications | Album |
|---|---|---|---|---|---|---|---|---|---|---|---|---|
| "Let It Whip" | 2012 | — | — | — | — | — | — | — | — | — | | Non-album singles |
| "Need Someone" | 2013 | — | — | — | — | — | — | — | — | — | | Non-album singles |
| "My House / These Sheets" (with James Silk) | 2013 | — | — | — | — | — | — | — | — | — | | Non-album singles |
| "Move or Not" | 2013 | — | — | — | — | — | — | — | — | — | | Non-album singles |
| "People" (with Teenage Mutants) | 2014 | — | — | — | — | — | — | — | — | — | | Non-album singles |
| "Something About Us" | 2014 | — | — | — | — | — | — | — | — | — | | Non-album singles |
| "Musique" | 2014 | — | — | — | — | — | — | — | — | — | | Non-album singles |
| "Get Lost" (with Teenage Mutants) | 2015 | — | — | — | — | — | — | — | — | — | | Non-album singles |
| "Soul So Sweet" (featuring Natalie Conway) | 2015 | — | — | — | — | — | — | — | — | — | | Non-album singles |
| "L.O.V.E." (with Boris Dlugosch) | 2015 | — | — | — | — | — | — | — | — | — | | Non-album singles |
| "Set It Out" (with Boris Dlugosch) | 2016 | — | — | — | — | — | — | — | — | — | | Non-album singles |
| "Sambal" (with Aeroplane) | 2016 | — | — | — | — | — | — | — | — | — | | Non-album singles |
| "Counting on Me" (with Aeroplane featuring Aloe Blacc) | 2016 | — | — | — | — | — | — | — | — | — | | Non-album singles |
| "Body Funk" | 2017 | — | — | — | — | — | — | — | — | — | | Soulmatic |
| "Devil in Me" (featuring Joe Killington and Duane Harden) | 2017 | — | — | — | 88 | — | — | — | — | — | SNEP: Platinum | Soulmatic |
| "Dished (Male Stripper)" | 2018 | — | — | 36 | — | — | — | — | — | — | | Non-album single |
| "Encore" (featuring Baxter) | 2018 | — | — | — | — | — | — | — | — | — | | Soulmatic |
| "Love for Days" (with Boris Dlugosch and Karen Harding) | 2018 | — | — | — | — | — | — | — | — | — | | Soulmatic |
| "In My Arms" | 2020 | — | — | — | — | — | — | — | — | — | | Non-album single |
| "Hypnotized" (with Sophie and the Giants) | 2020 | 11 | 23 | 9 | 61 | 2 | 7 | 1 | — | 18 | BVMI: 3× Gold; BEA: Gold; FIMI: 5× Platinum; IFPI AUT: 2× Platinum; IFPI SWI: Platinum; SNEP: Diamond; ZPAV: 3× Platinum | Exotica |
| "Exotica" (featuring Mind Enterprises) | 2020 | — | — | — | — | — | — | — | — | — | | Exotica |
| "Fireworks" (with Moss Kena and The Knocks) | 2021 | 32 | 34 | 15 | — | 42 | — | 5 | — | 83 | FIMI: Platinum; IFPI AUT: Platinum; ZPAV: Gold | Exotica |
| "Playbox" | 2021 | — | — | — | — | — | — | — | — | — | | Exotica |
| "Dopamine" (featuring Eyelar) | 2021 | 34 | 52 | 12 | 192 | 97 | 25 | 5 | — | — | BVMI: Gold; FIMI: Gold; IFPI AUT: Platinum; SNEP: Gold; ZPAV: Gold | Exotica |
| "Rise" (featuring Tasita D'Mour) | 2021 | — | — | — | — | — | — | — | — | — | | Exotica |
| "In the Dark" (with Sophie and the Giants) | 2022 | 12 | 26 | 3 | 76 | 68 | 3 | 2 | — | 40 | BVMI: Gold; FIMI: Platinum; IFPI AUT: Platinum; IFPI SWI: Gold; SNEP: Platinum; ZPAV: Platinum | Exotica |
| "Summer Lovin'" (with Cerrone) | 2022 | — | — | — | — | — | — | — | — | — | | Exotica |
| "Twisted Mind" (featuring Agnes) | 2022 | — | — | — | — | — | — | — | — | — | | Exotica |
| "Substitution" (with Kungs featuring Julian Perretta) | 2023 | 18 | 18 | 2 | 26 | 47 | 19 | 3 | — | 19 | BVMI: Gold; BEA: Platinum; FIMI: Platinum; IFPI AUT: Platinum; IFPI SWI: Platinum; SNEP: Platinum; ZPAV: 3× Platinum; MAHASZ: 6× Platinum | Paradise |
| "Bad Company" | 2023 | — | — | — | — | — | — | — | — | — | | Paradise |
| "Paradise" (with Sophie and the Giants) | 2023 | — | — | — | — | — | — | — | — | — | MAHASZ: Platinum | Paradise |
| "Something on My Mind" (with Duke Dumont and Nothing but Thieves) | 2023 | — | — | 4 | — | — | ― (Note: "Something on My Mind" did not enter the Single Top 100, but peaked at number seven on the Single Tip chart.) | — | — | — | | Paradise |
| "Beat of Your Heart" (with Ásdís) | 2024 | 50 | — | 11 | — | — | — | 8 | — | — | MAHASZ: Platinum; ZPAV: Gold | Paradise |
| "Higher Ground" (featuring Roosevelt) | 2024 | — | — | — | — | — | — | — | — | — | | Paradise |
| "Honey Boy" (with Benjamin Ingrosso featuring Nile Rodgers and Shenseea) | 2024 | — | — | — | — | — | — | 6 | 2 | — | IFPI Norge: Gold; GLF: Platinum; ZPAV: Gold | Paradise |
| "Heartbreaker" (with Chromeo) | 2024 | — | — | — | — | — | — | — | — | — | | Paradise |
| "Die Maschine" (with Friedrich Liechtenstein) | 2024 | — | — | — | — | — | — | — | — | — | | Paradise |
| "All My Life" (with the Magician) | 2024 | — | — | 9 | — | — | — | 55 | — | — | | Paradise |
| "Dream Machine" (with Alison Goldfrapp) | 2025 | — | — | — | — | — | — | — | — | — | | Paradise (Deluxe) |
| "Ghost Town" (featuring Retrosonix) | 2025 | — | — | — | — | — | — | — | — | — | | Non-album singles |
| "Fire & Ice" (featuring Jake Shears) | 2025 | — | — | — | — | — | — | — | — | — | | Non-album singles |
| "Disco Cherry" | 2026 | — | — | — | — | — | — | — | — | — | | Non-album singles |
| "Test My Luck" (with Meek) | 2026 | — | — | — | — | — | — | — | — | — | | Cosmotropia |
"—" denotes a recording that did not chart or was not released.

== Awards and nominations ==
| Award ceremony | Year | Nominated work | Category | Result |
|---|---|---|---|---|
| Grammy Awards | 2023 | "About Damn Time (Remix)" | Best Remixed Recording, Non-Classical | Won |
| Berlin Music Video Awards | 2024 | "Beat of Your Heart" (featuring Ásdís) | Best VFX | Nominated |
