= List of number-one digital albums of 2017 (Australia) =

ARIA Charts number-one digital albums of 2017 < 2016 2018 >

Other Australian number-one charts of 2017
- albums
- singles
- urban singles
- dance singles
- club tracks
- digital tracks
- streaming tracks

Top Australian singles and albums of 2017
- Triple J Hottest 100
- top 25 singles
- top 25 albums

The ARIA Digital Album Chart ranks the best-performing albums and extended plays (EPs) in Australia. Its data, published by the Australian Recording Industry Association, is based collectively on the weekly digital sales of albums and EPs.

== Chart history ==
Date	Album	Artist(s)	Ref.
2 January	Christmas	Michael Bublé	
9 January	Trolls: Original Motion Picture Soundtrack	Various Artists	
16 January	Trolls: Original Motion Picture Soundtrack	Various Artists	
23 January	I See You	The xx	
30 January	Dragonfly	Kasey Chambers	
6 February	Trolls: Original Motion Picture Soundtrack	Various Artists	
13 February	The Kids Will Know It's Bullshit	Dune Rats	
20 February	Fifty Shades Darker: Original Motion Picture Soundtrack	Various Artists	
27 February	Fifty Shades Darker: Original Motion Picture Soundtrack	Various Artists	
6 March	25	Adele	
13 March	÷	Ed Sheeran	
20 March	÷	Ed Sheeran	
27 March	÷	Ed Sheeran	
3 April	÷	Ed Sheeran	
10 April	÷	Ed Sheeran	
17 May	÷	Ed Sheeran	
24 May	Damn	Kendrick Lamar	
1 May	÷	Ed Sheeran	
8 May	Off the Grid	Bliss n Eso	
15 May	÷	Ed Sheeran	
22 May	Harry Styles	Harry Styles	
29 May	÷	Ed Sheeran	
5 June	÷	Ed Sheeran	
12 June	÷	Ed Sheeran	
19 June	Truth Is a Beautiful Thing	London Grammar	
26 June	Melodrama	Lorde	
3 July	Evolve	Imagine Dragons	
10 July	Hydrograd	Stone Sour	
17 July	4:44	Jay-Z	
24 July	Low Blows	Meg Mac	
31 July	Hybrid Theory	Linkin Park	
7 August	Count On Me	Judah Kelly	
14 August	÷	Ed Sheeran	
21 August	Life Is Fine	Paul Kelly	
28 August	Go Farther in Lightness	Gang of Youths	
4 September	Villains	Queens of the Stone Age	
11 September	Freedom Child	The Script	
18 September	All the Light Above It Too	Jack Johnson	
25 September	Concrete and Gold	Foo Fighters	
2 October	Wonderful Wonderful	The Killers	
9 October	Younger Now	Miley Cyrus	
16 October	Triple J's Like a Version Volume 13	Various Artists	
23 October	Beautiful Trauma	Pink	
30 October	Beautiful Trauma	Pink	
6 November	Vintage Modern	360	
13 November	The Thrill of It All	Sam Smith	
20 November	Reputation	Taylor Swift	
27 November	Reputation	Taylor Swift	
4 December	Reputation	Taylor Swift	
11 December	Songs of Experience	U2	
18 December	What Makes You Country	Luke Bryan	
25 December	Revival	Eminem	

== Number-one artists ==
Position	Artist	Weeks at No. 1
1	Ed Sheeran	12
2	Taylor Swift	3
3	Pink	2
4	360	1
4	Adele	1
4	Bliss n Eso	1
4	Dune Rats	1
4	Eminem	1
4	Foo Fighters	1
4	Gang of Youths	1
4	Harry Styles	1
4	Imagine Dragons	1
4	Jack Johnson	1
4	Jay-Z	1
4	Judah Kelly	1
4	Kasey Chambers	1
4	Kendrick Lamar	1
4	The Killers	1
4	Linkin Park	1
4	London Grammar	1
4	Lorde	1
4	Luke Bryan	1
4	Meg Mac	1
4	Michael Bublé	1
4	Miley Cyrus	1
4	Paul Kelly	1
4	Queens of the Stone Age	1
4	Sam Smith	1
4	The Script	1
4	Stone Sour	1
4	U2	1
4	The xx	1

== See also ==
- 2017 in music
- ARIA Charts
- List of number-one singles of 2017 (Australia)
