= List of number-one urban albums of 2017 (Australia) =

ARIA Charts number-one urban albums of 2017 < 2016 2018 >

Other Australian number-one charts of 2017
- albums
- singles
- urban singles
- dance singles
- club tracks
- digital tracks
- streaming tracks

Top Australian singles and albums of 2017
- Triple J Hottest 100
- top 25 singles
- top 25 albums

This is a list of albums that reached number-one on the ARIA Urban Albums Chart in 2017. The ARIA Urban Albums Chart is a weekly chart that ranks the best-performing urban albums in Australia. It is published by the Australian Recording Industry Association (ARIA), an organisation that collects music data for the weekly ARIA Charts. To be eligible to appear on the chart, the recording must be an album of a predominantly urban nature.

== Chart history ==
Issue date	Album	Artist(s)	Reference
2 January	Starboy	The Weeknd	
9 January	Starboy	The Weeknd	
16 January	Starboy	The Weeknd	
23 January	Starboy	The Weeknd	
30 January	Starboy	The Weeknd	
6 February	Starboy	The Weeknd	
13 February	I Decided	Big Sean	
20 February	Everyone We Know	Thundamentals	
27 February	Lemonade	Beyoncé	
6 March	Bardo State	Horrorshow	
13 March	Gang Signs & Prayer	Stormzy	
20 March	Starboy	The Weeknd	
27 March	More Life	Drake	
3 April	More Life	Drake	
10 April	More Life	Drake	
17 April	All-Amerikkkan Badass	Joey Badass	
24 April	Damn	Kendrick Lamar	
1 May	R&B Fridays Volume 3	Various Artists	
8 May	Off the Grid	Bliss n Eso	
15 May	Damn	Kendrick Lamar	
22 May	Damn	Kendrick Lamar	
29 May	Damn	Kendrick Lamar	
5 June	Damn	Kendrick Lamar	
12 June	Damn	Kendrick Lamar	
19 June	Damn	Kendrick Lamar	
26 June	Damn	Kendrick Lamar	
3 July	Grateful	DJ Khaled	
10 July	Damn	Kendrick Lamar	
17 July	4:44	Jay-Z	
24 July	4:44	Jay-Z	
31 July	Flower Boy	Tyler, The Creator	
7 August	Damn	Kendrick Lamar	
14 August	Damn	Kendrick Lamar	
21 August	Damn	Kendrick Lamar	
28 August	Damn	Kendrick Lamar	
4 September	Damn	Kendrick Lamar	
11 September	Damn	Kendrick Lamar	
18 September	Damn	Kendrick Lamar	
25 September	Damn	Kendrick Lamar	
2 October	Gemini	Macklemore	
9 October	Gemini	Macklemore	
16 October	Gemini	Macklemore	
23 October	Gemini	Macklemore	
30 October	Stoney	Post Malone	
6 November	Vintage Modern	360	
13 November	Heartbreak on a Full Moon	Chris Brown	
20 November	Engraved in the Game	Kerser	
27 November	R&B Superclub Volume 17	Various Artists	
4 December	R&B Superclub Volume 17	Various Artists	
11 December	R&B Superclub Volume 17	Various Artists	
18 December	R&B Superclub Volume 17	Various Artists	
25 December	Revival	Eminem	

== Number-one artists ==
Position	Artist	Weeks at No. 1
1	Kendrick Lamar	17
2	The Weeknd	7
3	Macklemore	4
4	Drake	3
5	Jay-Z	2
6	360	1
6	Beyoncé	1
6	Big Sean	1
6	Bliss n Eso	1
6	Chris Brown	1
6	DJ Khaled	1
6	Eminem	1
6	Horrorshow	1
6	Joey Badass	1
6	Kerser	1
6	Post Malone	1
6	Stormzy	1
6	Thundamentals	1
6	Tyler, The Creator	1

== See also ==
- 2017 in music
- List of number-one albums of 2017 (Australia)
