= List of number-one country albums of 2017 (Australia) =

ARIA Charts number-one country albums of 2017 < 2016 2018 >

Other Australian number-one charts of 2017
- albums
- singles
- urban singles
- dance singles
- club tracks
- digital tracks
- streaming tracks

Top Australian singles and albums of 2017
- Triple J Hottest 100
- top 25 singles
- top 25 albums

These are the Australian Country number-one albums of 2017, per the ARIA Charts.

Issue date	Album	Artist
2 January	Ripcord	Keith Urban
9 January	Ripcord	Keith Urban
16 January	Ripcord	Keith Urban
23 January	Endless	The McClymonts
30 January	Dragonfly	Kasey Chambers
6 February	Dragonfly	Kasey Chambers
13 February	Dragonfly	Kasey Chambers
20 February	Get on your Feet	Adam Brand
27 February	Ripcord	Keith Urban
6 March	Ripcord	Keith Urban
13 March	Ripcord	Keith Urban
20 March	Ripcord	Keith Urban
27 March	So Country 2017	Various artists
3 April	The 25th Anniversary Album	Lee Kernaghan
10 April	The 25th Anniversary Album	Lee Kernaghan
17 April	The 25th Anniversary Album	Lee Kernaghan
24 April	The 25th Anniversary Album	Lee Kernaghan
1 May	Love and War	Brad Paisley
8 May	The Great Country Songbook Volume 2	Adam Harvey and Beccy Cole
15 May	The Great Country Songbook Volume 2	Adam Harvey and Beccy Cole
22 May	Welcome Home	Zac Brown Band
29 May	Back to Us	Rascal Flatts
5 June	Songs on My Sleeve	Caitlyn Shadbolt
12 June	Ripcord	Keith Urban
19 June	Heart Break	Lady Antebellum
26 June	Heart Break	Lady Antebellum
3 July	The Great Country Songbook Volume 2	Adam Harvey and Beccy Cole
10 July	Ripcord	Keith Urban
17 July	Ripcord	Keith Urban
24 July	Ripcord	Keith Urban
31 July	Ripcord	Keith Urban
7 August	Count On Me	Judah Kelly
14 August	Count On Me	Judah Kelly
21 August	Count On Me	Judah Kelly
28 August	Men of Country 2017	Various artists
4 September	Men of Country 2017	Various artists
11 September	DCX MMXVI Live	Dixie Chicks
18 September	Slowheart	Kip Moore
25 September	Ripcord	Keith Urban
2 October	Real Class Act	Fanny Lumsden
9 October	Now	Shania Twain
16 October	Now	Shania Twain
23 October	Now	Shania Twain
30 October	Now	Shania Twain
6 November	Now	Shania Twain
13 November	Unapologetically	Kelsea Ballerini
20 November	Now	Shania Twain
27 November	The Rest of Our Life	Tim McGraw and Faith Hill
4 December	The Rest of Our Life	Tim McGraw and Faith Hill
11 December	From A Room: Volume 2	Chris Stapleton
18 December	What Makes You Country	Luke Bryan
25 December	What Makes You Country	Luke Bryan

== See also ==
- 2017 in music
- List of number-one albums of 2017 (Australia)
