= List of Canadian Hot 100 number-one singles of 2017 =

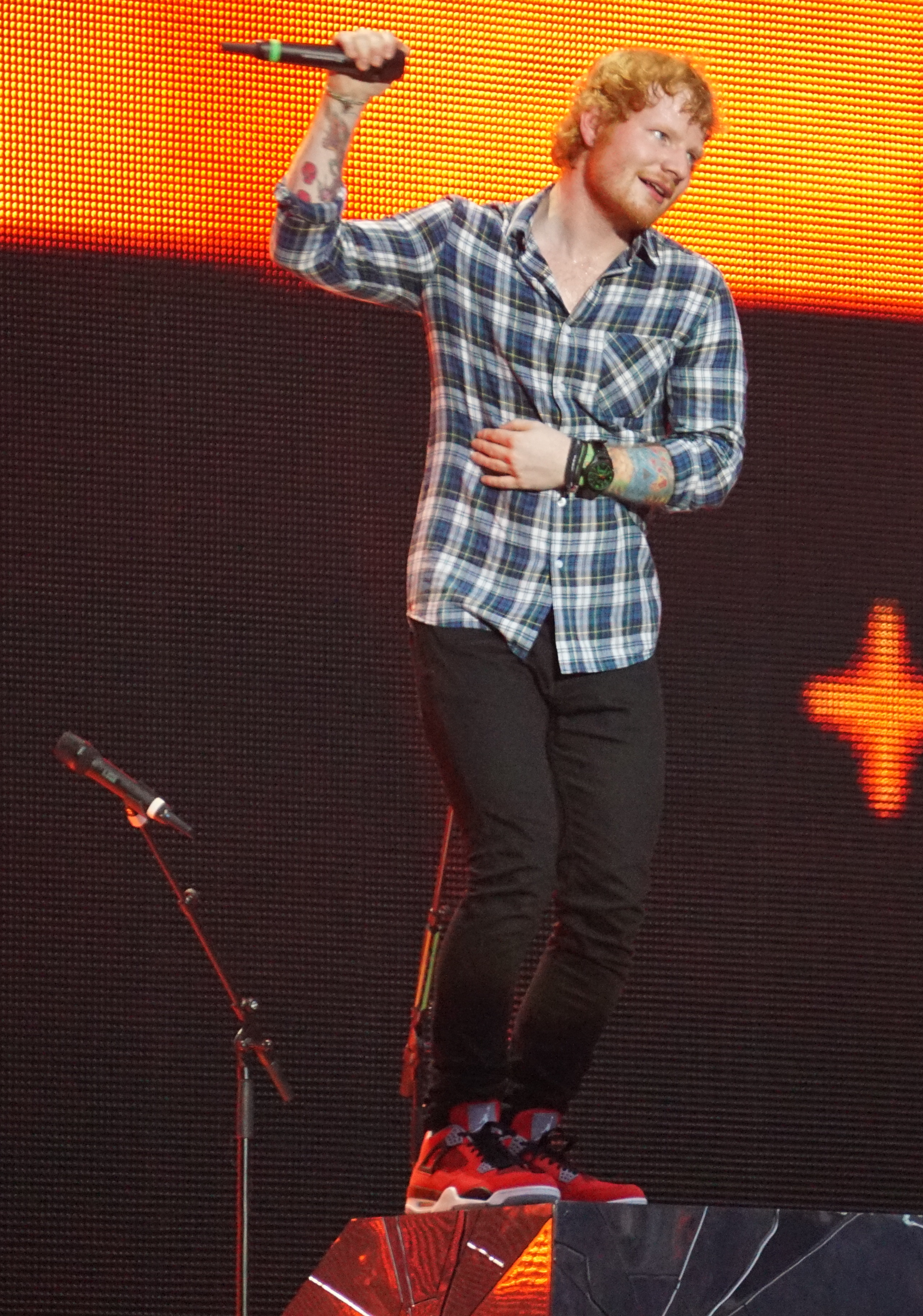
"Shape of You" by Ed Sheeran (pictured) spent sixteen weeks at number one, tying for the longest run at number one since the chart's inception in 2007. It also became the joint-longest-running number-one single of the year, and later ranked as the best-performing single of the year.

This is a list of the Canadian Hot 100 number-one singles of 2017. The Canadian Hot 100 is a chart that ranks the best-performing singles of Canada. Its data, published by Billboard magazine and compiled by Nielsen SoundScan, is based collectively on each single's weekly physical and digital sales, as well as airplay and streaming.

Note that Billboard publishes charts with an issue date approximately 10–11 days in advance.

== Chart history ==
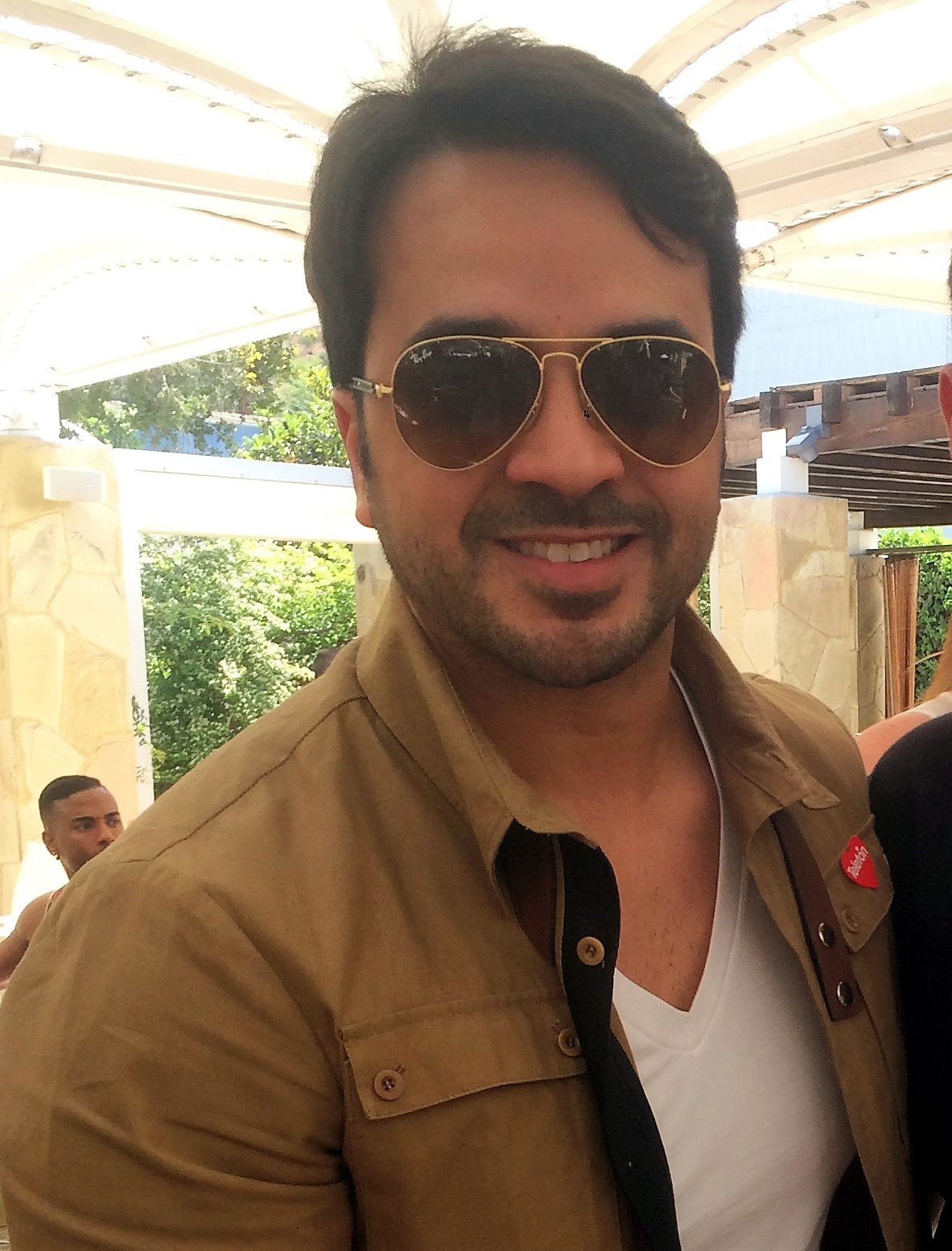
"Despacito" by Luis Fonsi (pictured) and Daddy Yankee featuring Justin Bieber spent sixteen weeks at number one, tying for the longest run at number one since the chart's inception in 2007. It also became the joint-longest-running number-one single of the year.

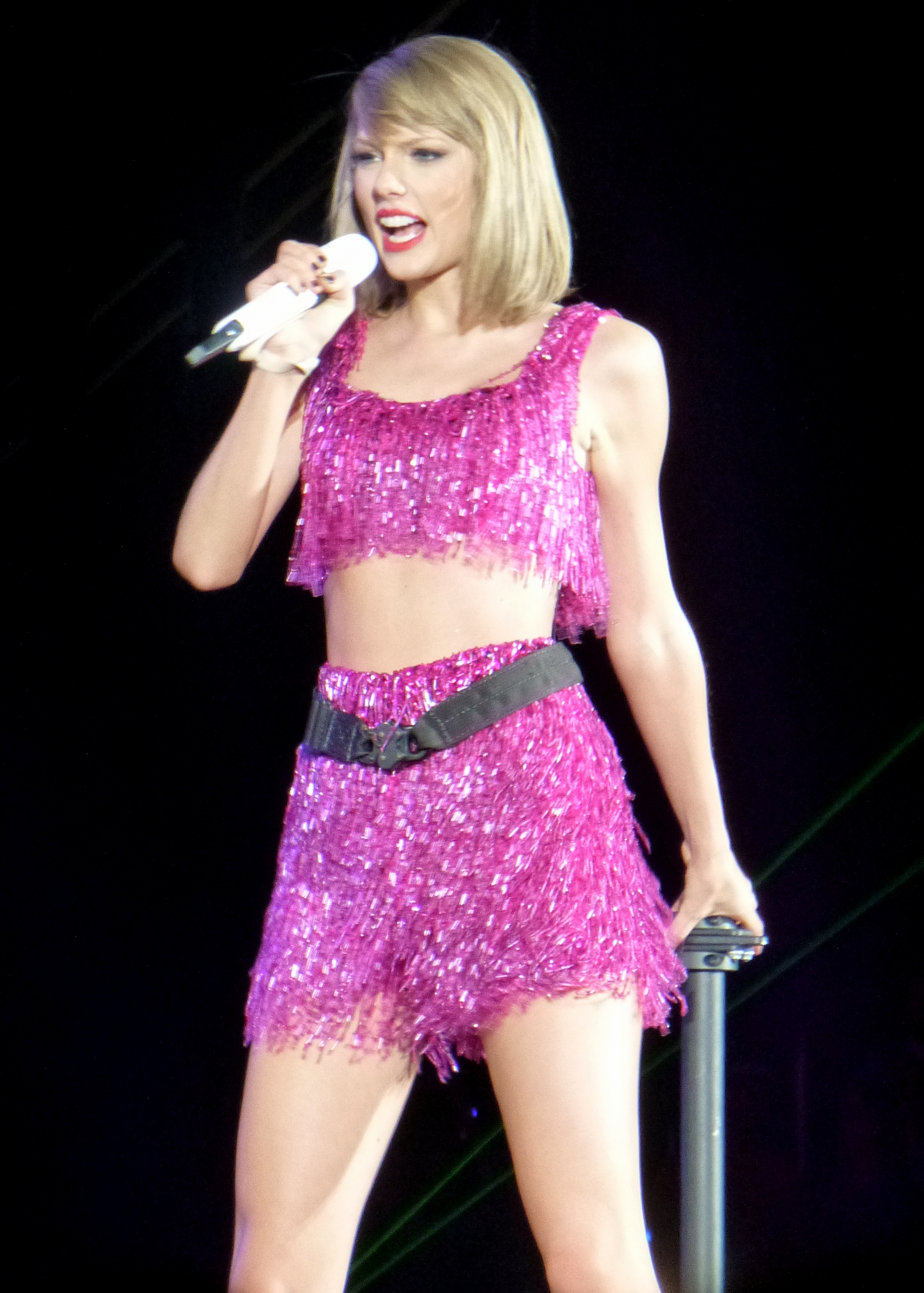
"Look What You Made Me Do" by Taylor Swift (pictured) debuted at number one, becoming the twentieth song to do so.

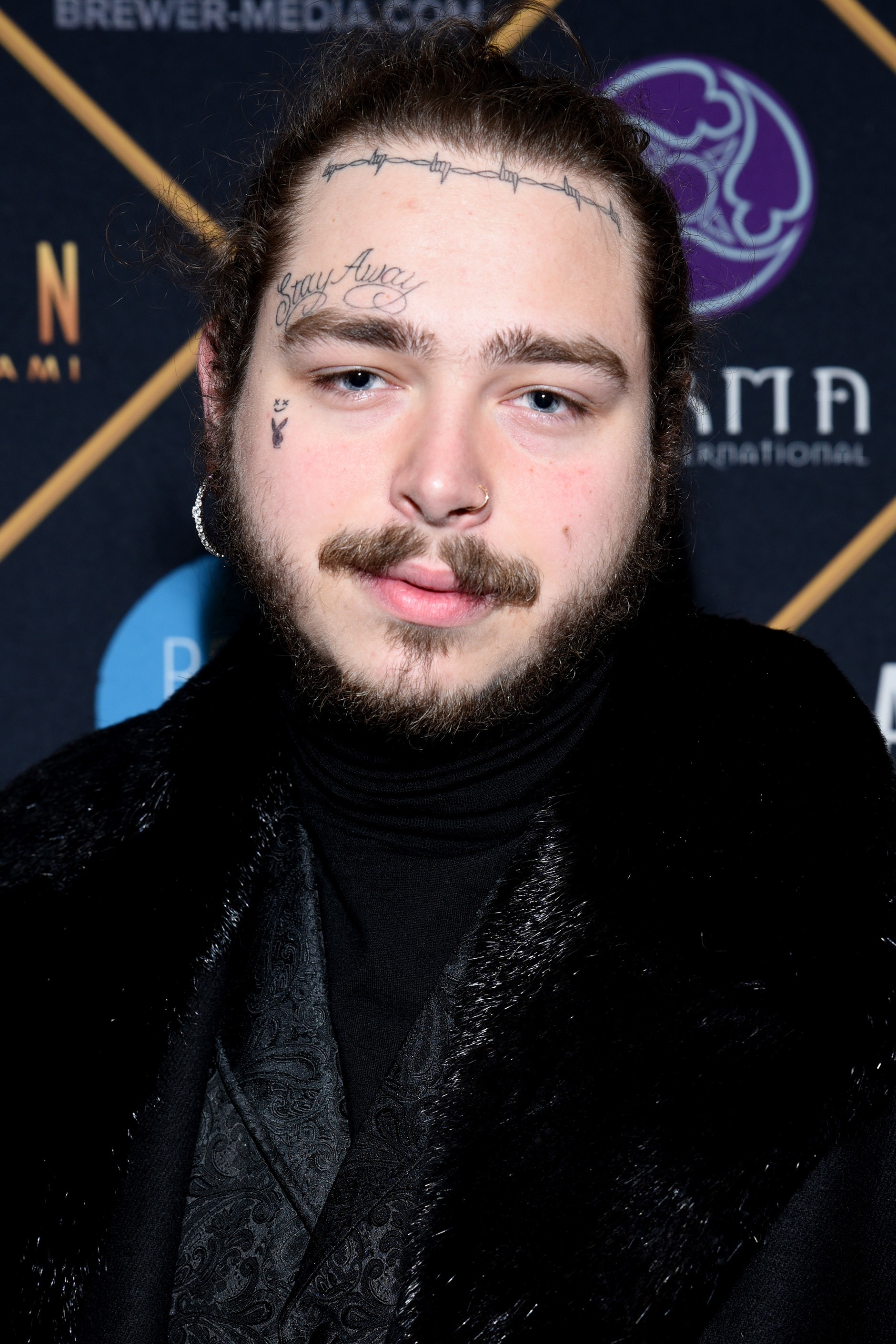
"Rockstar" by Post Malone (pictured) featuring 21 Savage debuted at number one, becoming the twenty-first song to do so.

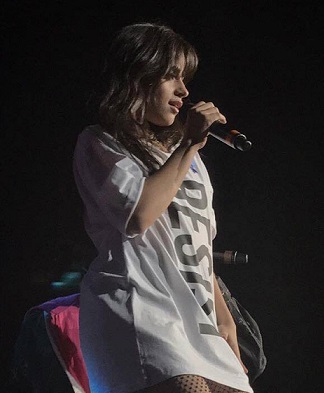
Camila Cabello (pictured) and Young Thug scored their first number-one single with "Havana".

Key
†	Indicates best-performing single of 2017

No.	Issue date	Song	Artist(s)	Ref.
115	January 7	"Starboy"	The Weeknd featuring Daft Punk	
115	January 14	"Starboy"	The Weeknd featuring Daft Punk	
115	January 21	"Starboy"	The Weeknd featuring Daft Punk	
116	January 28	"Shape of You" †	Ed Sheeran	
116	February 4	"Shape of You" †	Ed Sheeran	
116	February 11	"Shape of You" †	Ed Sheeran	
116	February 18	"Shape of You" †	Ed Sheeran	
116	February 25	"Shape of You" †	Ed Sheeran	
116	March 4	"Shape of You" †	Ed Sheeran	
116	March 11	"Shape of You" †	Ed Sheeran	
116	March 18	"Shape of You" †	Ed Sheeran	
116	March 25	"Shape of You" †	Ed Sheeran	
116	April 1	"Shape of You" †	Ed Sheeran	
116	April 8	"Shape of You" †	Ed Sheeran	
116	April 15	"Shape of You" †	Ed Sheeran	
116	April 22	"Shape of You" †	Ed Sheeran	
116	April 29	"Shape of You" †	Ed Sheeran	
116	May 6	"Shape of You" †	Ed Sheeran	
116	May 13	"Shape of You" †	Ed Sheeran	
117	May 20	"I'm the One"	DJ Khaled featuring Justin Bieber, Quavo, Chance the Rapper and Lil Wayne	
118	May 27	"Despacito"	Luis Fonsi and Daddy Yankee featuring Justin Bieber	
118	June 3	"Despacito"	Luis Fonsi and Daddy Yankee featuring Justin Bieber	
118	June 10	"Despacito"	Luis Fonsi and Daddy Yankee featuring Justin Bieber	
118	June 17	"Despacito"	Luis Fonsi and Daddy Yankee featuring Justin Bieber	
118	June 24	"Despacito"	Luis Fonsi and Daddy Yankee featuring Justin Bieber	
118	July 1	"Despacito"	Luis Fonsi and Daddy Yankee featuring Justin Bieber	
118	July 8	"Despacito"	Luis Fonsi and Daddy Yankee featuring Justin Bieber	
118	July 15	"Despacito"	Luis Fonsi and Daddy Yankee featuring Justin Bieber	
118	July 22	"Despacito"	Luis Fonsi and Daddy Yankee featuring Justin Bieber	
118	July 29	"Despacito"	Luis Fonsi and Daddy Yankee featuring Justin Bieber	
118	August 5	"Despacito"	Luis Fonsi and Daddy Yankee featuring Justin Bieber	
118	August 12	"Despacito"	Luis Fonsi and Daddy Yankee featuring Justin Bieber	
118	August 19	"Despacito"	Luis Fonsi and Daddy Yankee featuring Justin Bieber	
118	August 26	"Despacito"	Luis Fonsi and Daddy Yankee featuring Justin Bieber	
118	September 2	"Despacito"	Luis Fonsi and Daddy Yankee featuring Justin Bieber	
118	September 9	"Despacito"	Luis Fonsi and Daddy Yankee featuring Justin Bieber	
119	September 16	"Look What You Made Me Do"	Taylor Swift	
119	September 23	"Look What You Made Me Do"	Taylor Swift	
119	September 30	"Look What You Made Me Do"	Taylor Swift	
120	October 7	"Rockstar"	Post Malone featuring 21 Savage	
120	October 14	"Rockstar"	Post Malone featuring 21 Savage	
120	October 21	"Rockstar"	Post Malone featuring 21 Savage	
120	October 28	"Rockstar"	Post Malone featuring 21 Savage	
120	November 4	"Rockstar"	Post Malone featuring 21 Savage	
120	November 11	"Rockstar"	Post Malone featuring 21 Savage	
121	November 18	"Havana"	Camila Cabello featuring Young Thug	
121	November 25	"Havana"	Camila Cabello featuring Young Thug	
121	December 2	"Havana"	Camila Cabello featuring Young Thug	
121	December 9	"Havana"	Camila Cabello featuring Young Thug	
121	December 16	"Havana"	Camila Cabello featuring Young Thug	
122	December 23	"Perfect"	Ed Sheeran and Beyoncé	
122	December 30	"Perfect"	Ed Sheeran and Beyoncé	

== See also ==
- List of number-one albums of 2017 (Canada)
