= Look What You Made Me Do =

2017 single by Taylor Swift

Single by Taylor Swift

from the album Reputation
- Released: August 24, 2017
- Studio: Rough Customers (Brooklyn)
- Genre: Electropop; dance-pop; progressive pop; synth-punk
- Length: 3:31
- Label: Big Machine
- Songwriters: Taylor Swift; Jack Antonoff; Fred Fairbrass; Richard Fairbrass; Rob Manzoli
- Producers: Taylor Swift; Jack Antonoff

Taylor Swift singles chronology
"I Don't Wanna Live Forever" (2016)	"Look What You Made Me Do" (2017)	"...Ready for It?" (2017)

Music video
- "Look What You Made Me Do" on YouTube

"Look What You Made Me Do" is a song by the American singer-songwriter Taylor Swift and the lead single from her sixth studio album, Reputation (2017). Big Machine Records released the song on August 24, 2017, following an approximately year-long hiatus due to the controversies that affected Swift's public image in 2016.

Written and produced by Swift and Jack Antonoff, "Look What You Made Me Do" has an electronic production combining electropop, dance-pop, progressive pop, and synth-punk with elements of hip-hop, electroclash, industrial, and electro. It contains an interpolation of "I'm Too Sexy" (1991) by the English pop group Right Said Fred, whose members received songwriting credits as a result. The melody incorporates strings, plinking piano, and synthesizers, and the chorus consists of drumbeats and rhythmic chants. The lyrics are about the narrator's contempt for somebody who had wronged them. Many media publications interpreted the track to be a reference to the controversies that Swift faced, including the Kanye West feud.

The accompanying music video premiered at the 2017 MTV Video Music Awards and contains various implications of Swift's celebrity that received widespread media speculation. Both the song and the video broke streaming records on Spotify and YouTube upon release. "Look What You Made Me Do" polarized music critics: some deemed it a fierce return and an interesting direction but others criticized the sound and theme as harsh and vindictive and opined that it strayed away from Swift's singer-songwriter artistry. Critics have considered "Look What You Made Me Do" a career-defining comeback single for Swift.

Commercially, the song charted at number one in 12 countries, including Australia, Canada, Ireland, Malaysia, New Zealand, and the Philippines. It became Swift's first number-one song on the UK singles chart. On the United States Billboard Hot 100, "Look What You Made Me Do" debuted at number one with the highest sales and streaming week of 2017, spending three weeks atop the chart. The single received multi-platinum certifications in Australia, Brazil, Canada, Poland, Sweden, the United Kingdom, and the United States. Swift performed the song on the Reputation Stadium Tour (2018) and the Eras Tour (2023–2024).

== Background and release ==
Taylor Swift released her fifth studio album, 1989, on October 27, 2014; it sold 10 million copies worldwide less than three years after its release, and its singles received heavy rotation on radio for one year and a half, leading to Billboard describing its success as "a kind of cultural omnipresence that's rare for a 2010s album". The album propelled Swift to pop stardom, and her fame was accompanied by increasing media scrutiny on her image.

Her once-wholesome "America's Sweetheart" reputation was tarnished by short-lived romantic relationships and public celebrity controversies, including a publicized feud with the rapper Kanye West and his then-wife, the media personality Kim Kardashian, over West's song "Famous" (2016), in which he claims he made Swift a success ("I made that bitch famous"). Although Swift said she never consented to the lyric, Kardashian released a phone recording between Swift and West in which Swift seemingly consented to another portion of the song's lyrics. After the West–Kardashian controversy, Swift became a subject of an online "#IsOverParty" hashtag, where online audiences used the "snake" emoji to describe her. Detractors regarded Swift as fake and calculating, a conclusion that surmounted after years of what they saw as a deliberate maneuver to carefully cultivate her public image. Swift became increasingly reticent on social media despite her large following and avoided the press amidst the commotion, ultimately withdrawing from public appearances. She opted to take a hiatus after The 1989 World Tour concluded in December 2015, stating "I think people might need a break from me".

On August 18, 2017, Swift blacked out all of her social media accounts, which prompted media speculation on new music. In the following days, she uploaded silent, black-and-white short videos of CGI snakes onto social media, which attracted widespread press attention. Imagery of snakes was inspired by the West–Kardashian controversy and featured prominently in Swift's social media posts. On August 23, she announced on Instagram a new album, titled Reputation. The following day, she unveiled the lead single from the album, "Look What You Made Me Do", which was released for streaming and download on digital platforms by Big Machine Records. A lyric video was released simultaneously; it was produced by Swift and Joseph Kahn and created by ODD. The lyric video features prominent snake imagery, depicting the chorus with an ouroboros, and its graphics were influenced by the aesthetics of Saul Bass for the 1958 film Vertigo. It was viewed over 19 million times within the first 24 hours on YouTube, setting a record for the most-viewed lyric video in that time frame. "Look What You Made Me Do" was released to US contemporary hit radio on August 29, 2017. Media publications regarded "Look What You Made Me Do" as Swift's comeback after her year of hiatus from the public spotlight.

== Production and music ==
Swift wrote and produced "Look What You Made Me Do" with Jack Antonoff, who also programmed the track and played its instruments, recorded at Rough Customer Studio in Brooklyn. Other musicians on the track included Evan Smith (saxophone), Victoria Parker (violin), and Phillip A. Peterson (cello). Laura Sisk engineered the song, and Serban Ghenea mixed it at MixStar Studios in Virginia Beach, Virginia. The track was mastered by Randy Merrill at Sterling Sound in New York.

"Look What You Made Me Do"
A sample of the pre-chorus and chorus of "Look What You Made Me Do"; the pre-chorus incorporates piano and synth-stimulated brass and the chorus consists of drumbeats and rhythmic chants of the song title

"Look What You Made Me Do" is 3 minutes and 31 seconds long. It is written in the key of A minor and has a tempo of 128 beats per minute. The track begins with string swell and plinking piano keys and progresses into an electronic production; The New York Times wrote that the opening strings and piano were melodramatic and evoked a "dark, fantasy-film" atmosphere, whereas The Daily Telegraph's Sarah Carson described the strings as "Hollywood"-inspired.

The verses and chorus are built on a minor-key motif, electronic tones, and hip-hop-inspired beats and vocal cadences. The pre-chorus incorporates piano and synth-simulated brass, and the bridge incorporates strings that swell over a reverberating crescendo. The chorus consists of drumbeats and rhythmic chants of the title, which is repeated eight times with different tones of delivery. The melody contains an interpolation of "I'm Too Sexy" (1991) by the English pop group Right Said Fred, leading to its members Richard Fairbrass, Fred Fairbrass, and Rob Manzoli receiving writing credits. The Fairbrass brothers were contacted one week before the release of "Look What You Made Me Do" and were asked whether a "big, contemporary female artist who hasn't released anything for a while" would be able to use a portion of their song for her latest single; they found out that the artist in question was Swift after the song was released.

The New York Times's Jon Pareles commented that the piano and strings in the pre-chorus and bridge gave them a "melodramatic, emotional" feel, whereas Swift's repeating the title in the chorus sounded "vindictive, mocking, dismissive, even a little playful". Music critics described the genre as electropop, dance-pop, progressive pop, and synth-punk. The production incorporates retro elements of electroclash, mid-1980s and 1990s industrial and electro, and mid-2000s pop. Some critics commented that the track showcased a "darker" soundscape compared to Swift's previous releases; Brittany Spanos of Rolling Stone attributed this effect partly to the "dark techno" of Britney Spears's 2007 album Blackout, while Maura Johnston in The Guardian said that the atmosphere evoked Spears's "Piece of Me" (2007) and the beat was reminiscent of Peaches's "Operate" (2003).

== Lyrics and interpretations ==
With the key themes being betrayal and vengeance, "Look What You Made Me Do" was developed by Swift as a poem about her feelings and realizations that she could not trust certain people and could only rely on a few. The verses contain lyrics such as, "I don't like your perfect crime/ How you laugh when you lie"; according to Pareles, these lyrics resemble a nursery rhyme, and they could be interpreted as referring to either the celebrity feuds or the feelings after a romantic breakup. Swift's character resents that her enemies set her up for humiliation ("You said the gun was mine/ Isn't cool, no, I don't like you"), affirms that she remembers all the wrongdoings ("I got a list of names and yours is in red, underlined/ I check it once, then I check it twice"), and reassures that her enemies will get what they deserve ("Maybe I got mine, but you'll all get yours").

In the pre-chorus, Swift's character asserts that she became wiser and hardened, "I rose up from the dead, I do it all the time." The chorus is made up of the title, "Look what you made me do", repeated eight times; Swift said that this part came when "the beat hit" and the production team decided to "edit out the rest of the words". In the bridge, Swift's character threatens to give her enemies nightmares ("I don't trust nobody and nobody trusts me/ I'll be the actress, starring in your bad dreams") and tells that the old version of her was dead, delivered through a sound effect that resembles a telephone call: "The old Taylor can't come to the phone right now/ Why?/ 'Cause she's dead"; Swift said that these lyrics were the most important part of the song.

According to Swift, the song used some tropes from the TV series Game of Thrones: the "list of names" was inspired by Arya Stark's "kill list", and the "vibes" were inspired by the characters Cersei Lannister and Daenerys Targaryen. Although "Look What You Made Me Do" does not mention any particular person, many publications interpreted some of its parts as references to the West–Kardashian controversy: "I don't like your tilted stage", "the old Taylor can't come to the phone right now". Swift confirmed in a 2019 Rolling Stone cover story that the "phone call" lyric referred to "a stupid phone call I shouldn't have picked up". There were also comments that some parts referenced Swift's fallout with Katy Perry or her ex-boyfriends Calvin Harris and Tom Hiddleston.

According to Carson, the songwriting contains some of the "storybook lyricism and fairytale tropes" that Swift had employed before, such as the imagery of kingdoms and dreams and the idea of revenge, which recalled songs like "Should've Said No" (2006), "Better than Revenge" (2010), and "Bad Blood" (2014); Billboard's Tatiana Cirisano said that the dreams imagery evoked the songs from 1989 such as "Blank Space" or "Wildest Dreams".

== Critical reception ==
Upon release, "Look What You Made Me Do" polarized music critics. Some considered the single a fierce return and an interesting move for Swift to reclaim her public narrative, whereas others found the production and themes vindictive, harsh, and off-putting. USA Today said that the polarized reaction to the song illustrated Swift's position as a "ubiquitous cultural force".

The Daily Telegraph's Sarah Carson praised the song, deeming Swift and Antonoff's work as "blowing past the production clichés of clap tracks and hiccuped syllabic hooks that have proliferated across Top 40 fare in recent years with boldly inventive textures and fresh melodic, rhythmic and sonic accents". She also added how the track musically and sonically shifted alongside the lyrics. Randy Lewis of the Los Angeles Times wrote a positive review of the song, saying: "The reverberating crescendo builds and ever more delicious is the wickedness of Swift's menacing protagonist", praising Swift for her successful embrace of the villain character the media has portrayed her as previous to the song's release. Variety's Chris Willman also praised Swift's embrace of darker-styled pop music and the stylistic conflict between the song's pre-chorus and chorus. Mark Harris, writing for Vulture, thought of Swift's song as a pop art anthem for the Trump era in how she reappropriates her public feuds as empowering badges of honor without acknowledging her responsibility or blame.

Maura Johnston of The Guardian wrote a negative review of the song, faulting the "sloppy" lyrics and blaming Swift for not giving a clear context in the lyrics. Lindsay Zoladz of The Ringer said, "Unleashed on a deeply confused public late Thursday night, the song is a strange collage of retro reference points: mid-aughts Gossip Girl placement pop, the soundtrack to Disney's live-action Maleficent, and — yes, really — Right Said Fred's "I'm Too Sexy", except devoid of the self-effacing humor and wit. Yes, the new Taylor Swift song just made me compliment Right Said Fred." The single was noted as being darker and angrier than what Swift had done before. Meaghan Garvey from Pitchfork referred to it in a review as "a hardcore self-own" track.

Retrospective reviews have considered "Look What You Made Me Do" a career-defining song for Swift. In 2019, Slant Magazine listed "Look What You Made Me Do" as one of the 100 singles that defined the 2010s decade; Sal Cinquemani described it as Swift's first "bona fide misstep" but also a bold and authentic artistic work. In 2023, Zoya Raza-Sheikh of The Independent opined that the single portrayed Swift as a "beleaguered" pop star.

== Commercial performance ==
"Look What You Made Me Do" broke various streaming and sales records upon release. It earned two records related to streaming in the Guinness World Records in 2018: most streamed track on Spotify in the first 24 hours, and most streamed track in one week (female).

In the United States, the single began at number 77 on the Billboard Hot 100, one of few record charts in the world to combine sales and streaming with airplay. Airplay within its first three days of release was behind the debut. It sold slightly under 200,000 digital copies within its first day of sales. In its second charting week, the song rose to number one with 84.4 million streams and 353,000 downloads. It became Swift's fifth number-one single and largest jump to number one since her 2012 single "We Are Never Ever Getting Back Together", which debuted at number 72 before topping the chart a week later. "Look What You Made Me Do" ended the 16-week run at number one of Luis Fonsi's "Despacito", scoring the largest sales and streaming week of 2017. It also had the largest streaming week since Baauer's "Harlem Shake" (2013) and the biggest digital sales week since Justin Timberlake's "Can't Stop the Feeling!" (2016).

The single stayed at number one on the Billboard Hot 100 for three consecutive weeks. In its second week at number one, Swift's single "...Ready for It?" charted at number four, making it the first time a female artist had two songs in the top five of the Hot 100 since 2015, when Swift's singles "Blank Space" and "Shake It Off" were both in the top five. "Look What You Made Me Do" also topped the Pop Songs chart, becoming Swift's eighth single to do so. In July 2018, the Recording Industry Association of America (RIAA) certified the song four-times platinum for surpassing four million units based on sales and streams.

"Look What You Made Me Do" became Swift's first number-one single on the UK singles chart, and it spent two weeks at number one. As of December 2022, the single had sold over one million combined units in the United Kingdom. Elsewhere, the single peaked at number one on the Euro Digital Song Sales chart by Billboard, and on the charts in Ireland, Australia, New Zealand, Canada, and the Philippines. It was certified double diamond in Brazil, seven-times platinum in Australia, triple platinum platinum in Canada and New Zealand, and double platinum in Poland, Sweden, and the United Kingdom.

== Music video ==
=== Production and release ===
Preparation for the music video began in January 2017, while the shooting took place in May. The dance was choreographed by Tyce Diorio, who had previously worked with Swift on the video for her 2014 single "Shake It Off". Swift's makeup as a zombie was done by Bill Corso. Post-production of the video lasted until the morning of its release date. A 20-second music video teaser was released on Good Morning America on August 25.

The song's music video premiered on August 27, 2017, at the 2017 MTV Video Music Awards. The video broke the record for the most-watched video within 24 hours by achieving 43.2 million views on YouTube on its first day. It topped the 27.7 million Vevo views Adele's "Hello" attracted in that timeframe, as well as the 36 million YouTube views of Psy's "Gentleman" video. It was viewed at an average 30,000 times per minute in its first 24 hours, with views reaching over three million views per hour. The video was named the fifth-best music video of 2017 by Rolling Stone and the seventh-best music video of 2017 by Billboard. In 2020, Parade ranked the video 20th on the list of 71 Best Music Videos of All Time.

=== Synopsis ===
The bathtub scene in the music video. The diamonds used were said to be authentic and worth over $10 million, and a lone dollar bill can be seen.

Swift has said that part of the premise of the video is rooted in the idea that, "If everything you write about me was true, this is how ridiculous it would look." It is a satirical send-up of media theories about her true intentions that have little validity. The video begins with an overhead shot of a cemetery before the camera zooms in on a grave with a headstone that reads "Here lies Taylor Swift's reputation." After that, a zombie Swift, wearing the dress from her "Out of the Woods" music video, crawls out of the grave before proceeding to dig another grave for her Met Gala 2014 self. The next scene shows Swift in a bathtub filled with diamonds, with a necklace spelling out "No" next to a ring, supposedly sending up tabloid press rumors of her past romantic relationships. She is then seen seated on a throne while snakes surround her and serve tea. Swift later crashes her golden Bugatti Veyron on a post and sings the song's chorus holding a Grammy as the paparazzi take photos. She is also seen swinging inside a golden cage, robbing a streaming company in a cat mask, and leading a motorcycle gang. Afterward, she gathers a group of women at "Squad U" and dances with a group of men in another room. Then, she is seen standing on top of the wing of a plane in an airport hangar, sawing off the wing in half and spray-painting "reputation" in pink on the side of the plane. At the video's climax, Swift is seen standing on a T-shaped throne mountain while clones of herself (from her past music videos, stage performances, and red-carpet appearances) struggle and fight against each other trying to reach her. The Swift at the top of the mountain stretches out her arms, and many of the other Swifts fall off the mountain, while Swift from another scene picks up a phone and says "I'm sorry, the old Taylor can't come to the phone right now. Why? Oh, 'cause she's dead!" The video concludes with a scene of a line-up of surviving Swift clones bowing in the hangar while Swift stands and watches on the wing of the plane. The clones bicker with one another, describing each other as "so fake" and "playing the victim". The 2009 VMA Swift clone then says "I would very much like to be excluded from this narrative", resulting in the other Swifts yelling at her to "shut up!" in unison.

Several scenes from the music video were compared to the works of Croatian singer Severina, particularly the scene with the group of women at "Squad U" and the scene with the T-shaped throne. The former was compared to her 2016 music video for "Silikoni", and the latter was compared to the performances from her 2013 Dobrodošao u Klub Tour.

=== Analysis ===
The video contains numerous hidden meanings and references. In the opening scene, there is a subtle "Nils Sjöberg" tombstone shown when Swift is digging up a grave, referencing the pseudonym she used for a songwriting credit on Calvin Harris's 2016 single "This Is What You Came For". Similarly, Swift—masked as a cadaveric version of herself in the "Out of the Woods" music video—was shown digging a grave for herself in the gown worn to the 2014 Met Gala. The zombie Swift rising from her supposed "grave" is also speculated to be a subtle reference to Michael Jackson's "Thriller" music video, which showcases a zombie rising from their grave very similarly to the position Swift was in. A single dollar bill in the bathtub full of diamonds that she bathes in was also speculated to symbolize the dollar she was awarded for winning a sexual assault trial earlier in 2017. The Independent and The Atlantic speculated that the bathtub scene is a jibe at Kim Kardashian, the then-wife of Swift's long-time feuding partner, Kanye West. Some viewers took the scene as a reference to Kardashian's 2016 robbery, in which she was robbed of jewelry worth over $10 million while held at gunpoint at a hotel in Paris, France.

In a separate scene, Swift is shown sitting atop a golden throne, where a carving of the phrase "Et tu, Brute?" could be seen on the armrest, a reference to William Shakespeare's drama Julius Caesar. Swift's history of being called a "snake" during her hiatus was also represented when a snake slithers onto the throne to serve Swift some tea. The scene where Swift's car crashes and is surrounded by paparazzi was speculated by some to be a jab at Katy Perry, as Swift's hairstyle is similar to Perry's in the scene and the car crash itself is reminiscent of the one in Perry's music video for "Unconditionally" (2013). The sports car was also suspected to be a reminder of a car in Perry's "Waking Up in Vegas" (2009) video, which Kahn also directed. However, given the video's theme of mocking the media, the car crash scene likely makes fun of the theory that Swift's real fallout with Perry was a dramatized act for publicity and album material. Swift is ridiculing the idea that she would damage her friendships for business gains, with the car crash being a metaphor for her feud with Perry and the Grammy Award in her hands in the wreckage symbolizing the awards won from the songs "inspired" by the aforementioned feud. Swift's withdrawal of her entire music catalog from streaming services and the media's claims that she was doing this for greed and to start her streaming company was hinted at when Swift and her crew robbed a streaming company's money vault in the video.

Swift leading an army of tall, skinny, and robotic women at a "Squad U" gathering poked fun at the media's accusations that her close group of friends were artificial and had unrealistic body shapes. During the second chorus, Swift is seen with eight men, each of whom revealed an "I Heart TS" crop top after unbuttoning a jacket at her command. This scene mocks the idea that Swift forced her then-boyfriend Tom Hiddleston to wear an "I Heart TS" tank top. During the bridge, Swift stands on a mountain of clones of her past selves, which reiterates that she is leaving behind her "America's Sweetheart" image and embracing her newfound role as an evil "snake". The clones are wearing various noteworthy outfits that Swift herself previously wore. The shirt that her "You Belong with Me" music video clone wears, however, is slightly different from the original one: this time, the names of her current close friends are scribbled on it.

The video's ending features an assembly of "old Taylors" in front of a private jet who are talking amongst one another and making snide references to the many false and exaggerated media portrayals of her throughout her career. These include claims that Swift fakes her classic surprised face at award shows; that her "nice girl" façade masks a truly mean, manipulative personality; accusations that Swift always plays the victim instead of taking responsibility for her actions and decisions; and numerous mentions of her 2016 feud with Kanye West and Kim Kardashian, ignited by the release of his 2016 song "Famous". Examples include the "that bitch" line in "Famous" which Swift had disapproved of, and Kardashian illegally recording and editing Swift's phone call with West. In June 2016, discussing the relationship between her and West after the release of "Famous", Swift wrote on Instagram, "I would very much like to be excluded from this narrative." The same line is spoken by the 2009 MTV Video Music Awards Taylor clone just before the video ends. She is wearing the same outfit Swift had worn during the actual 2009 MTV Video Music Awards when West interrupted her acceptance speech for the Best Female Video award and ignited tensions between the two for the first time.

== Live performances ==
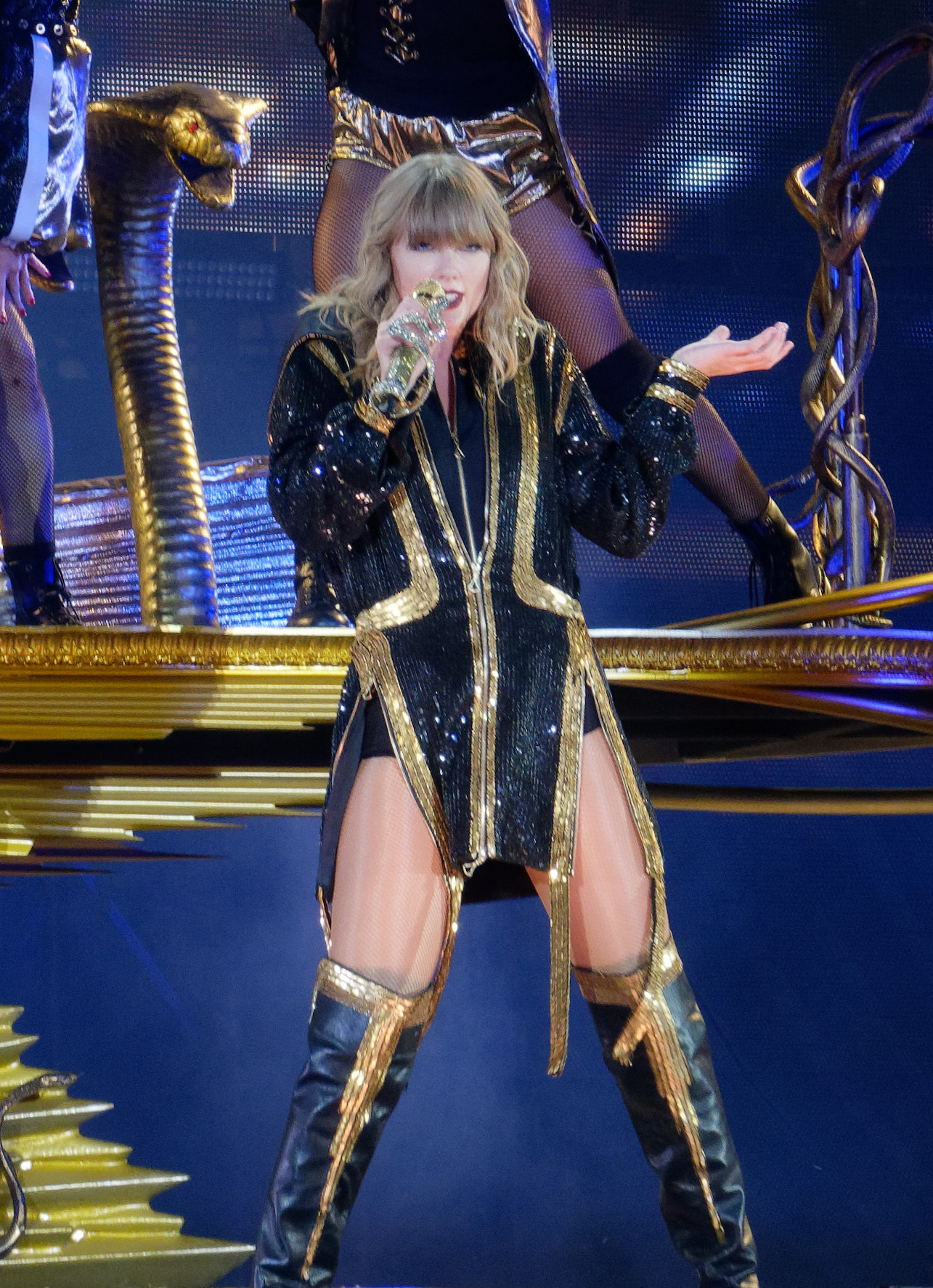
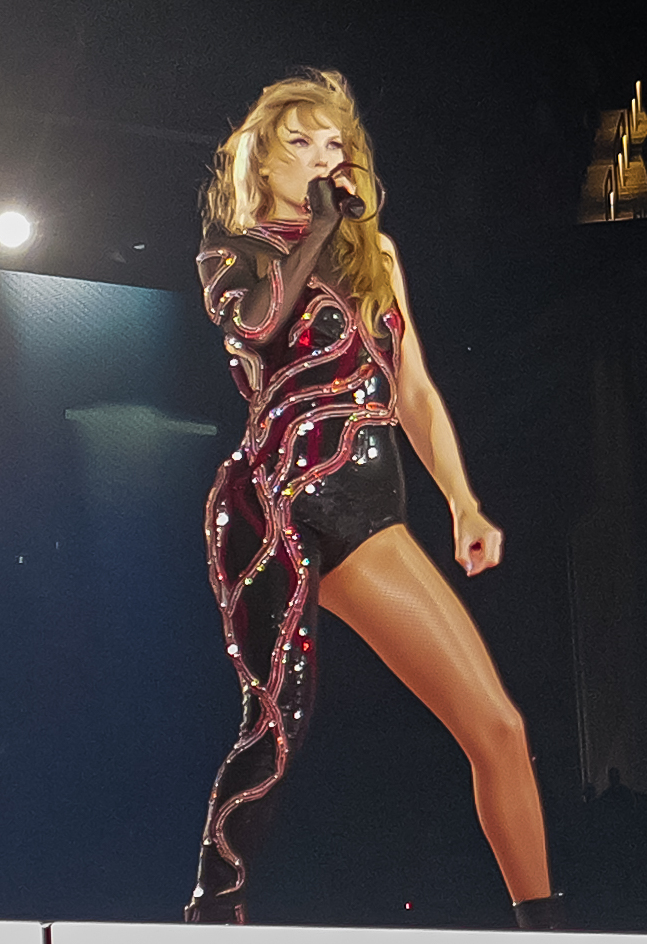
Swift performing "Look What You Made Me Do" on her Reputation Stadium Tour in 2018 (left) and the Eras Tour in 2023 (right)

Swift performed "Look What You Made Me Do" live for the first time as part of the KIIS-FM Jingle Ball 2017 on December 1, 2017, in Inglewood, California. Two days later, Swift returned onstage to perform the song again as part of 99.7 Now!'s Poptopia in San Jose, California with the same setlist. The next week Swift sang the song on three other occasions; the B96 Chicago and Pepsi Jingle Bash 2017 in Chicago, the Z100 Jingle Ball 2017 in New York City, and the Jingle Bell Ball 2017 in London.

The song was also a regular part of her set list for the Reputation Stadium Tour, with a tilted throne and golden snakes; while there are snakes on the high screen in the back during the part where she sings, "I don't trust nobody and nobody trust me, I'll be the actress starring in your bad dreams", a large floating cobra appears onstage with the line from the bridge announcing the death of the "Old Taylor" spoken by comedian Tiffany Haddish. Swift included "Look What You Made Me Do" on the set list of the Eras Tour (2023–2024). On the Eras Tour, while Swift is performing "Look What You Made Me Do," she is surrounded by her backup singers and dancers, who are dressed as various past versions of herself and trapped inside large clear boxes. This iconography is similar to that which was used in the music video. Prior to the announcement and release of Speak Now (Taylor's Version), many fans noticed Taylor pounding on the box with the dancer dressed in the Speak-Now-era purple halter dress, and speculated that this interaction signaled that Speak Now would be the next album to be rerecorded.

== Other uses ==
ABC used "Look What You Made Me Do" in a promotional video for its Shonda Rhimes's Thursday line-up an hour after its release. ESPN used the song in Saturday Night Football advertisements for the season-opening game between Alabama and Florida State, which was aired on ABC on September 2 along with her other song "...Ready for It?". In the South Park episode "Moss Piglets", the water bears in Timmy and Jimmy's experiment for the science fair dance to the song in response to Swift's singing. The song was used in the trailer for the 2019 comedy film Murder Mystery. American actress Reese Witherspoon performs the song for the jukebox musical film, Sing 2, in the role of Rosita.

After a public dispute in 2019 regarding the ownership to the master recordings of Swift's albums released under Big Machine (including Reputation), which were acquired by the talent manager Scooter Braun, Swift began re-recording those albums in November 2020. By re-recording the albums, Swift had full ownership of the new masters, which enabled her to control the licensing of her songs for commercial use and therefore substituted the Big Machine–owned masters. The re-recorded albums and songs are identified with an extended "Taylor's Version" moniker. A cover version of "Look What You Made Me Do" was recorded by the band Jack Leopards & the Dolphin Club, and produced by Antonoff and Nils Sjöberg, the latter being a pseudonym that Swift first used as a co-writer for the song "This Is What You Came For" by Calvin Harris featuring Rihanna. The cover was featured in the opening credits of "Beautiful Monster", an episode of the television show Killing Eve that aired on May 24, 2020, and subsequently released on digital music platforms. There is no documentation of the band's existence before the release of the cover, and it was speculated the person singing was Swift's brother Austin Swift. Fans also interpreted the cover to be Swift's way of bypassing potential licensing issues with her former label Big Machine Records and its owner Scooter Braun.

On August 23, 2023, a snippet of the re-recorded song "Look What You Made Me Do (Taylor's Version)" was used in a trailer for the Amazon Prime Video series Wilderness; it was later also used as the show's theme song. The full first and second verses and the two choruses of the song were used in the opening scene of the penultimate episode of The Handmaid's Tale, released on May 20, 2025. Billboard wrote that the re-recording features recreations of the original synths and beats, while Swift's vocals are from "an older, more experienced Swift". On May 30, 2025, Swift announced that she had acquired the original albums, and that she had not completed re-recording Reputation, leaving the status of the re-recorded "Look What You Made Me Do" unclear.

== Accolades ==
Awards ceremony	Year	Category	Result	Ref.
MTV Europe Music Awards	2017	Best Music Video	Nominated	
NRJ Music Awards	2017	Video of the Year	Nominated	
MTV Millennial Awards Brazil	2018	Best International Hit	Nominated	
NME Awards	2018	Best Music Video	Nominated	
iHeartRadio Music Awards	2018	Best Music Video	Nominated	
iHeartRadio Music Awards	2018	Best Lyrics	Nominated	
Nickelodeon Kids' Choice Awards	2018	Favorite Song	Nominated	
Myx Music Award	2018	Favourite International Video	Nominated	
Radio Disney Music Awards	2018	Song of the Year	Nominated	
Radio Disney Music Awards	2018	Best Song To Lip-Sync To	Nominated	
Teen Choice Awards	2018	Choice Song by a Female Artist	Nominated	
Hito Music Awards	2018	Best Western Song	Won	
MTV Video Music Awards	2018	Best Art Direction	Nominated	
MTV Video Music Awards	2018	Best Editing	Nominated	
MTV Video Music Awards	2018	Best Visual Effects	Nominated	
BMI London Awards	2018	Pop Award	Won	
BMI Pop Awards	2019	Award Winning Song	Won	
TEC Awards	2019	Best Record Production / Single or Track	Nominated	

== Credits and personnel ==
Credits are adapted from the liner notes of Reputation.

- Taylor Swift – vocals, songwriter, producer
- Jack Antonoff – producer, songwriter, programming, instruments
- Richard Fairbrass – songwriter, interpolation
- Fred Fairbrass – songwriter, interpolation
- Bob Manzoli – songwriter, interpolation
- Laura Sisk – engineer
- Serban Ghenea – mixing
- John Hanes – mix engineer
- Randy Merrill – mastering
- Evan Smith – saxophones
- Victoria Parker – violins
- Phillip A. Peterson – cellos

== Charts ==
=== Weekly charts ===
Chart (2017–2018)	Peak position
Argentina Anglo (Monitor Latino)	4
Australia (ARIA)	1
Austria (Ö3 Austria Top 40)	2
Belgium (Ultratop 50 Flanders)	8
Belgium (Ultratop 50 Wallonia)	39
Bulgaria (PROPHON)	9
Canada Hot 100 (Billboard)	1
Canada AC (Billboard)	33
Canada CHR/Top 40 (Billboard)	10
Canada Hot AC (Billboard)	10
CIS Airplay (TopHit)	69
Colombia (Promúsica)	18
Colombia (National-Report)	46
Costa Rica (Monitor Latino)	6
Croatia (HRT)	1
Czech Republic Airplay (ČNS IFPI)	39
Czech Republic Singles Digital (ČNS IFPI)	1
Denmark (Tracklisten)	12
Ecuador (National-Report)	27
El Salvador (Monitor Latino)	7
Euro Digital Song Sales (Billboard)	1
Finland (Suomen virallinen lista)	8
France (SNEP)	26
Germany (GfK)	3
Germany Airplay (BVMI)	21
Greece Digital Songs (Billboard)	1
Greece International (IFPI)	2
Honduras (Monitor Latino)	15
Hong Kong (HKRIA)	6
Hungary (Single Top 40)	3
Hungary (Stream Top 40)	1
Ireland (IRMA)	1
Israel International Airplay (Media Forest)	1
Italy (FIMI)	10
Italian Airplay (EarOne)	29
Japan Hot 100 (Billboard)	7
Lebanon (Lebanese Top 20)	1
Luxembourg Digital Song Sales (Billboard)	5
Malaysia (RIM)	1
Mexico Airplay (Billboard)	10
Netherlands (Dutch Top 40)	7
Netherlands (Single Top 100)	13
New Zealand (Recorded Music NZ)	1
Norway (VG-lista)	6
Panama (Monitor Latino)	12
Philippines (Philippine Hot 100)	1
Portugal (AFP)	4
Russia Airplay (TopHit)	62
Romania (Airplay 100)	64
Scottish Singles Sales (Official Charts)	1
Slovakia Singles Digital (ČNS IFPI)	1
Slovenia (SloTop50)	26
South Korea (Circle)	92
Spain (Promusicae)	12
Sweden (Sverigetopplistan)	7
Switzerland (Schweizer Hitparade)	6
UK Singles (Official Charts)	1
Uruguay (Monitor Latino)	14
US Billboard Hot 100	1
US Adult Contemporary (Billboard)	19
US Adult Pop Airplay (Billboard)	7
US Dance Club Songs (Billboard)	9
US Dance Airplay (Billboard)	3
US Pop Airplay (Billboard)	1
US Rhythmic Airplay (Billboard)	20
Venezuela Anglo (Monitor Latino)	5
Venezuela (National-Report)	66

Chart (2024)	Peak position
Singapore (RIAS)	26

=== Year-end charts ===
Chart (2017)	Position
Australia (ARIA)	61
Austria (Ö3 Austria Top 40)	70
Brazil (Pro-Música Brasil)	129
Canada (Canadian Hot 100)	29
Costa Rica (Monitor Latino)	35
El Salvador (Monitor Latino)	12
Germany (Official German Charts)	81
Honduras (Monitor Latino)	28
Hungary (Single Top 40)	48
Hungary (Stream Top 40)	51
Latvia Airplay (LaIPA)	80
Netherlands (Dutch Top 40)	87
Nicaragua (Monitor Latino)	80
Paraguay (Monitor Latino)	92
Portugal (AFP)	89
Taiwan (Hito Radio)	12
UK Singles (Official Charts Company)	89
US Billboard Hot 100	39
US Adult Pop Songs (Billboard)	42
US Pop Songs (Billboard)	41

Chart (2018)	Position
South Korea International (Gaon)	87

== Certifications ==
Region	Certification	Certified units/sales
Australia (ARIA)	7× Platinum	490,000^{‡}
Austria (IFPI Austria)	Platinum	30,000^{‡}
Belgium (BRMA)	Gold	10,000^{‡}
Brazil (Pro-Música Brasil)	2× Diamond	320,000^{‡}
Canada (Music Canada)	3× Platinum	240,000^{‡}
Denmark (IFPI Danmark)	Gold	45,000^{‡}
France (SNEP)	Platinum	200,000^{‡}
Germany (BVMI)	Gold	200,000^{‡}
Italy (FIMI)	Platinum	50,000^{‡}
New Zealand (RMNZ)	3× Platinum	90,000^{‡}
Norway (IFPI Norway)	Platinum	60,000^{‡}
Poland (ZPAV)	2× Platinum	40,000^{‡}
Portugal (AFP)	Platinum	10,000^{‡}
Spain (Promusicae)	Platinum	60,000^{‡}
Sweden (GLF)	2× Platinum	80,000^{‡}
United Kingdom (BPI)	2× Platinum	1,200,000^{‡}
United States (RIAA)	4× Platinum	4,000,000^{‡}
^{‡} Sales+streaming figures based on certification alone.

== Release history ==
Release dates and formats
Region	Date	Format	Label	Ref.
Various	August 24, 2017	Streaming	Big Machine	
Various	August 25, 2017	Digital download	Big Machine	
Italy	August 25, 2017	Radio airplay	Universal	
United States	August 29, 2017	Contemporary hit radio	Big Machine	
Germany	October 27, 2017	CD single	Universal	

== See also ==
- List of most-streamed songs on Spotify
- List of Billboard Hot 100 number-one singles of 2017
- List of number-one Billboard Streaming Songs of 2017
- List of Billboard Mainstream Top 40 number-one songs of 2017
- List of UK Singles Chart number ones of the 2010s
- List of Canadian Hot 100 number-one singles of 2017
- List of number-one singles of 2017 (Australia)
- List of number-one digital tracks of 2017 (Australia)
- List of number-one streaming tracks of 2017 (Australia)
- List of number-one singles of 2017 (Ireland)
- List of number-one songs of 2017 (Malaysia)
- List of number-one singles from the 2010s (New Zealand)
