= Life Is Fine =

Studio album by Paul Kelly
- Released: 11 August 2017
- Recorded: 2017
- Genre: Folk rock
- Label: EMI Music Australia, Cooking Vinyl

Paul Kelly chronology
Death's Dateless Night (2016)	Life Is Fine (2017)	Nature (2018)

Singles from Life Is Fine
- 1. "Firewood and Candles" Released: 23 June 2017

Life Is Fine is the 23rd studio album by Australian musician Paul Kelly, released on 11 August 2017. The album debuted at number one on the ARIA Albums Chart with sales of 6,198 units. It is Kelly's first number-one album in Australia.

At the ARIA Music Awards of 2017, the album was nominated for seven awards, winning 4; Best Male Artist, Best Adult Contemporary Album, Engineer of the Year and Best Cover Art.

Professional ratings
Review scores
Source	Rating
Allmusic	3.5/5 stars

== Background and recording ==
Life Is Fine is Kelly's first solo album of original material since 2012's Spring and Fall, and follows on from two releases in 2016: Seven Sonnets and a Song, which saw Kelly putting the words of William Shakespeare to music; and Death's Dateless Night, a collaborative album with Charlie Owen primarily consisting of covers and funeral songs. The album was recorded in the first half of 2017 with Kelly's classic backing band, who return to playing with Kelly in 2014 following the Spring and Fall tour. The album takes its title from a poem by American poet Langston Hughes, and its words are put to music on the closing title track.

The album's first single, "Firewood and Candles," was released on 23 June 2017. An accompanying music video was released on 3 August 2017.

== Track listing ==
All songs written by Paul Kelly, except "Life is Fine;" written by Langston Hughes. All music written by Paul Kelly and Bill McDonald.

1. "Rising Moon"
2. "Finally Something Good"
3. "Firewood and Candles"
4. "My Man's Got a Cold"
5. "Rock Out on the Sea"
6. "Leah: The Sequel"
7. "Letter in the Rain"
8. "Josephina"
9. "Don't Explain"
10. "I Smell Trouble"
11. "Petrichor"
12. "Life Is Fine"

== Personnel ==
Adapted from the Life Is Fine electronic press kit.

- Paul Kelly – lead vocals, acoustic and electric guitars
- Bill McDonald – bass guitar, arrangement
- Cameron Bruce – piano, keyboards, backing vocals
- Ashley Naylor – lead guitar, backing vocals
- Peter Luscombe – drums, percussion, backing vocals
- Vika Bull – vocals
- Linda Bull – vocals

== Charts ==
=== Weekly charts ===
Chart (2017)	Peak position
Australian Albums (ARIA)	1
New Zealand Heatseeker Albums (RMNZ)	1
UK Independent Album Breakers (OCC)	20

=== Year-end charts ===
Chart (2017)	Position
Australian Albums (ARIA)	14

== Certifications ==
Region	Certification	Certified units/sales
Australia (ARIA)	Gold	35,000^{^}
^{^} Shipments figures based on certification alone.

== See also ==
- List of number-one albums of 2017 (Australia)
- List of top 25 albums for 2017 in Australia
