= List of top 25 singles for 2017 in Australia =

Top 25 singles of 2017 < 2016 2018 >

Other Australian top charts for 2017
- top 25 albums
- Triple J Hottest 100

Australian number-one charts of 2017
- albums
- singles
- urban singles
- dance singles
- club tracks
- digital tracks
- streaming tracks

The following lists the top 25 singles of 2017 in Australia from the Australian Recording Industry Association (ARIA) end-of-year singles chart.

Ed Sheeran’s single "Shape of You", was the highest selling single in Australia in 2017 with a sales accreditation of nine times platinum. It spent fifteen weeks at number one.

#	Title	Artist	Highest pos. reached
1	"Shape of You"	Ed Sheeran	1
2	"Despacito"	Luis Fonsi and Daddy Yankee featuring Justin Bieber	1
3	"Castle on the Hill"	Ed Sheeran	2
4	"Perfect"	Ed Sheeran	1
5	"Something Just like This"	The Chainsmokers and Coldplay	2
6	"Thunder"	Imagine Dragons	2
7	"Galway Girl"	Ed Sheeran	2
8	"HUMBLE."	Kendrick Lamar	2
9	"Glorious"	Macklemore featuring Skylar Grey	2
10	"There's Nothing Holdin' Me Back"	Shawn Mendes	4
11	"Strip That Down"	Liam Payne featuring Quavo	2
12	"Slow Hands"	Niall Horan	2
13	"I'm the One"	DJ Khaled featuring Justin Bieber, Quavo, Chance the Rapper and Lil Wayne	1
14	"Stay"	Zedd and Alessia Cara	3
15	"Issues"	Julia Michaels	5
16	"Rockstar"	Post Malone featuring 21 Savage	1
17	"I Don't Wanna Live Forever"	Zayn and Taylor Swift	3
18	"Symphony"	Clean Bandit featuring Zara Larsson	4
19	"Havana"	Camila Cabello featuring Young Thug	1
20	"It Ain't Me"	Kygo and Selena Gomez	4
21	"Unforgettable"	French Montana featuring Swae Lee	7
22	"New Rules"	Dua Lipa	2
23	"Green Light"	Lorde	4
24	"Attention"	Charlie Puth	10
25	"That's What I Like"	Bruno Mars	5
