= List of number-one digital tracks of 2017 (Australia) =

ARIA Charts number-one digital tracks of 2017 < 2016 2018 >

Other Australian number-one charts of 2017
- albums
- singles
- urban singles
- dance singles
- club tracks
- streaming tracks

Top Australian singles and albums of 2017
- Triple J Hottest 100
- top 25 singles
- top 25 albums

The ARIA Digital Track Chart is a chart that ranks the best-performing digital tracks singles of Australia. It is published by Australian Recording Industry Association (ARIA), an organisation who collect music data for the weekly ARIA Charts. To be eligible to appear on the chart, the recording must be a single not an EP and only paid downloads counted from downloadable outlets.

== Chart history ==
Key
†	Indicates number-one digital single of 2017

Issue date	Song	Artist(s)	Reference
2 January	"Rockabye"	Clean Bandit featuring Sean Paul and Anne-Marie	
9 January	"Rockabye"	Clean Bandit featuring Sean Paul and Anne-Marie	
16 January	"Shape of You"†	Ed Sheeran	
23 January	"Shape of You"†	Ed Sheeran	
30 January	"Shape of You"†	Ed Sheeran	
6 February	"Shape of You"†	Ed Sheeran	
13 February	"Shape of You"†	Ed Sheeran	
20 February	"Shape of You"†	Ed Sheeran	
27 February	"How Would You Feel (Paean)"	Ed Sheeran	
6 March	"Shape of You"†	Ed Sheeran	
13 March	"Shape of You"†	Ed Sheeran	
20 March	"Shape of You"†	Ed Sheeran	
27 March	"Shape of You"†	Ed Sheeran	
3 April	"Shape of You"†	Ed Sheeran	
10 April	"Shape of You"†	Ed Sheeran	
17 April	"Sign of the Times"	Harry Styles	
24 April	"Galway Girl"	Ed Sheeran	
1 May	"Galway Girl"	Ed Sheeran	
8 May	"I'm the One"	DJ Khaled featuring Justin Bieber, Quavo, Chance The Rapper & Lil Wayne	
15 May	"I'm the One"	DJ Khaled featuring Justin Bieber, Quavo, Chance The Rapper & Lil Wayne	
22 May	"Malibu"	Miley Cyrus	
29 May	"Despacito"	Luis Fonsi and Daddy Yankee featuring Justin Bieber	
5 June	"Despacito"	Luis Fonsi and Daddy Yankee featuring Justin Bieber	
12 June	"Despacito"	Luis Fonsi and Daddy Yankee featuring Justin Bieber	
19 June	"Despacito"	Luis Fonsi and Daddy Yankee featuring Justin Bieber	
26 June	"Despacito"	Luis Fonsi and Daddy Yankee featuring Justin Bieber	
3 July	"Despacito"	Luis Fonsi and Daddy Yankee featuring Justin Bieber	
10 July	"Slow Hands"	Niall Horan	
17 July	"Despacito"	Luis Fonsi and Daddy Yankee featuring Justin Bieber	
24 July	"Despacito"	Luis Fonsi and Daddy Yankee featuring Justin Bieber	
31 July	"Thunder"	Imagine Dragons	
7 August	"Thunder"	Imagine Dragons	
14 August	"Thunder"	Imagine Dragons	
21 August	"What About Us"	Pink	
28 August	"What About Us"	Pink	
4 September	"Look What You Made Me Do"	Taylor Swift	
11 September	"Look What You Made Me Do"	Taylor Swift	
18 September	"Too Good at Goodbyes"	Sam Smith	
25 September	"What About Us"	Pink	
2 October	"What About Us"	Pink	
9 October	"Same Love"	Macklemore & Ryan Lewis featuring Mary Lambert	
16 October	"Perfect"	Ed Sheeran	
23 October	"Perfect"	Ed Sheeran	
30 October	"Perfect"	Ed Sheeran	
6 November	"Havana"	Camila Cabello featuring Young Thug	
13 November	"Havana"	Camila Cabello featuring Young Thug	
20 November	"Perfect"	Ed Sheeran	
27 November	"Havana"	Camila Cabello featuring Young Thug	
4 December	"Havana"	Camila Cabello featuring Young Thug	
11 December	""Perfect Duet" version"	Ed Sheeran featuring Beyoncé	
18 December	""Perfect Duet" version"	Ed Sheeran featuring Beyoncé	
25 December	""Perfect Symphony" version"	Ed Sheeran featuring Andrea Bocelli	

== Number-one artists ==
Position	Artist	Weeks at No. 1
1	Ed Sheeran	22
2	Justin Bieber (as featuring)	9
3	Luis Fonsi	7
3	Daddy Yankee	7
4	Pink	4
4	Camila Cabello	4
4	Young Thug (as featuring)	4
5	Imagine Dragons	3
5	Beyoncé (as featuring)	2
6	Taylor Swift	2
6	Clean Bandit	2
6	Anne-Marie (as featuring)	2
6	Sean Paul (as featuring)	2
6	DJ Khaled	2
6	Chance the Rapper (as featuring)	2
6	Lil Wayne (as featuring)	2
6	Quavo (as featuring)	2
7	Andrea Bocelli	1
7	Harry Styles	1
7	Macklemore & Ryan Lewis	1
7	Mary Lambert (as featuring)	1
7	Miley Cyrus	1
7	Niall Horan	1
7	Sam Smith	1

== See also ==
- 2017 in music
- ARIA Charts
- List of number-one singles of 2017 (Australia)
