= List of number-one streaming tracks of 2017 (Australia) =

ARIA Charts number-one streaming tracks of 2017 < 2016 2018 >

Other Australian number-one charts of 2017
- albums
- singles
- urban singles
- dance singles
- club tracks
- digital tracks

Top Australian singles and albums of 2017
- Triple J Hottest 100
- top 25 singles
- top 25 albums

The ARIA Streaming Chart ranks the best-performing streaming tracks of Australia. It is published by Australian Recording Industry Association (ARIA), an organisation who collects music data for the weekly ARIA Charts.

== Chart history ==
Key
†	Indicates number-one streaming single of 2017

Issue date	Song	Artist(s)	Reference
2 January	"Starboy"	The Weeknd featuring Daft Punk	
9 January	"Starboy"	The Weeknd featuring Daft Punk	
16 January	"Shape of You"†	Ed Sheeran	
23 January	"Shape of You"†	Ed Sheeran	
30 January	"Shape of You"†	Ed Sheeran	
6 February	"Shape of You"†	Ed Sheeran	
13 February	"Shape of You"†	Ed Sheeran	
20 February	"Shape of You"†	Ed Sheeran	
27 February	"Shape of You"†	Ed Sheeran	
6 March	"Shape of You"†	Ed Sheeran	
13 March	"Shape of You"†	Ed Sheeran	
20 March	"Shape of You"†	Ed Sheeran	
27 March	"Shape of You"†	Ed Sheeran	
3 April	"Shape of You"†	Ed Sheeran	
10 April	"Shape of You"†	Ed Sheeran	
17 April	"Shape of You"†	Ed Sheeran	
24 April	"Humble"	Kendrick Lamar	
1 May	"Humble"	Kendrick Lamar	
8 May	"Humble"	Kendrick Lamar	
15 May	"I'm the One"	DJ Khaled featuring Justin Bieber, Quavo, Chance the Rapper and Lil Wayne	
22 May	"I'm the One"	DJ Khaled featuring Justin Bieber, Quavo, Chance the Rapper and Lil Wayne	
29 May	"Despacito"	Luis Fonsi and Daddy Yankee featuring Justin Bieber	
5 June	"Despacito"	Luis Fonsi and Daddy Yankee featuring Justin Bieber	
12 June	"Despacito"	Luis Fonsi and Daddy Yankee featuring Justin Bieber	
19 June	"Despacito"	Luis Fonsi and Daddy Yankee featuring Justin Bieber	
26 June	"Despacito"	Luis Fonsi and Daddy Yankee featuring Justin Bieber	
3 July	"Despacito"	Luis Fonsi and Daddy Yankee featuring Justin Bieber	
10 July	"Despacito"	Luis Fonsi and Daddy Yankee featuring Justin Bieber	
17 July	"Despacito"	Luis Fonsi and Daddy Yankee featuring Justin Bieber	
24 July	"Despacito"	Luis Fonsi and Daddy Yankee featuring Justin Bieber	
31 July	"Despacito"	Luis Fonsi and Daddy Yankee featuring Justin Bieber	
7 August	"Despacito"	Luis Fonsi and Daddy Yankee featuring Justin Bieber	
14 August	"Despacito"	Luis Fonsi and Daddy Yankee featuring Justin Bieber	
21 August	"Glorious"	Macklemore featuring Skylar Grey	
28 August	"Glorious"	Macklemore featuring Skylar Grey	
4 September	"Look What You Made Me Do"	Taylor Swift	
11 September	"Look What You Made Me Do"	Taylor Swift	
18 September	"Look What You Made Me Do"	Taylor Swift	
25 September	"1-800-273-8255"	Logic featuring Alessia Cara and Khalid	
2 October	"Rockstar"	Post Malone featuring 21 Savage	
9 October	"Rockstar"	Post Malone featuring 21 Savage	
16 October	"Rockstar"	Post Malone featuring 21 Savage	
23 October	"Rockstar"	Post Malone featuring 21 Savage	
30 October	"Rockstar"	Post Malone featuring 21 Savage	
6 November	"Rockstar"	Post Malone featuring 21 Savage	
13 November	"Rockstar"	Post Malone featuring 21 Savage	
20 November	"Rockstar"	Post Malone featuring 21 Savage	
27 November	"Rockstar"	Post Malone featuring 21 Savage	
4 December	"Rockstar"	Post Malone featuring 21 Savage	
11 December	"Perfect"	Ed Sheeran	
18 December	"Perfect"	Ed Sheeran	
25 December	"Perfect"	Ed Sheeran	

== Number-one artists ==
Position	Artist	Weeks at No. 1
1	Ed Sheeran	17
2	Justin Bieber (as featuring)	14
3	Luis Fonsi	12
3	Daddy Yankee	12
4	Post Malone	10
4	21 Savage (as featuring)	10
5	Kendrick Lamar	3
5	Taylor Swift	3
6	The Weeknd	2
6	Daft Punk (as featuring)	2
6	DJ Khaled	2
6	Chance the Rapper (as featuring)	2
6	Quavo (as featuring)	2
6	Lil Wayne (as featuring)	2
6	Macklemore	2
6	Skylar Grey (as featuring)	2
7	Logic	1
7	Alessia Cara (as featuring)	1
7	Khalid (as featuring)	1

== See also ==
- 2017 in music
- ARIA Charts
- List of number-one singles of 2017 (Australia)
