= I'm the One (DJ Khaled song) =

2017 single

Single by DJ Khaled featuring Justin Bieber, Quavo, Chance the Rapper, and Lil Wayne

from the album Grateful
- Released: April 28, 2017
- Recorded: 2016–2017
- Genre: Hip hop; pop rap
- Length: 4:49
- Label: We the Best; Epic
- Songwriters: Khaled Khaled; Justin Bieber; Quavious Marshall; Chancelor Bennett; Dwayne Carter Jr.; Nicholas Balding; Jason Boyd; Robert Brackins III; David Park; Ray Jacobs
- Producers: DJ Khaled; Nic Nac

DJ Khaled singles chronology
"Shining" (2017)	"I'm the One" (2017)	"Wild Thoughts" (2017)

Justin Bieber singles chronology
"Despacito" (remix) (2017)	"I'm the One" (2017)	"2U" (2017)

Quavo singles chronology
"Go Off" (2017)	"I'm the One" (2017)	"Trap Paris" (2017)

Chance the Rapper singles chronology
"All Night" (2017)	"I'm the One" (2017)	"May I Have This Dance" (remix) (2017)

Lil Wayne singles chronology
"Light My Body Up" (2017)	"I'm the One" (2017)	"The Way I Are (Dance with Somebody)" (2017)

Music video
- "I'm the One" on YouTube

"I'm the One" is a song by American disc jockey DJ Khaled featuring Canadian singer Justin Bieber and American rappers Quavo, Chance the Rapper, and Lil Wayne. The song was released on April 28, 2017, by We the Best and Epic Records as the second single from Khaled's tenth studio album Grateful. On July 27, 2018, all artists, with the exception of Lil Wayne, were featured on Khaled's "No Brainer" from his eleventh studio album, Father of Asahd (2019). On October 19, 2020, the song surpassed one billion streams on Spotify. In December 2024, the single became certified Diamond by the RIAA, making it Khaled, Chance, and Quavo's first Diamond record, Bieber's fourth, and Wayne's third.

== Background ==
DJ Khaled initially marketed the song in February 2017 by posting photos of the music video on his Instagram account. He announced the song's release date, title, and cover art on April 24, 2017. According to DJ Khaled, Quavo completed his verse for the song in five minutes after listening to the instrumentals.

== Composition ==
The song is written in the key of G major, vocal range spans from D_{4} to B_{5} following a chord progression of G-Em-C-D. DJ Khaled introduces the song, Justin Bieber sings the chorus, and Quavo, Chance the Rapper, and Lil Wayne take the verses.

== Chart performance ==
"I'm the One" debuted atop the Billboard Hot 100, becoming the first number-one single on the chart for DJ Khaled, Chance the Rapper, and Quavo (as a solo performer apart from Migos). It became the first hip hop song to do so since "Not Afraid" by Eminem in 2010. It became Bieber's fourth chart-topper, following the first three singles off Purpose. Lil Wayne topped the chart for the third time in his career, but for the first time since 2009. The song also entered the UK Singles Chart at number one, a first for DJ Khaled, Quavo, Lil Wayne, and Chance the Rapper, while it was Bieber's fifth chart-topping song in the UK. It topped international charts and entered at number one in Australia, Scotland, and Canada, and debuted or reached the top ten in several territories including New Zealand, Germany, Finland, Ireland, Denmark, Sweden, France, Austria, Norway and Portugal and top twenty in Spain, Hungary and Italy.

== Music video ==
The music video for "I'm the One", directed by Eif Rivera, was uploaded onto Khaled's YouTube channel on April 28, 2017. Models Alexa Lawrence and Iryna Ivanova and Quavo's fellow Migos members, Offset and Takeoff, make cameo appearances in the video. The video was filmed at a luxury mansion in 26848 CA-1, Malibu, CA 90265, USA, erroneously reported to be Khaled's own. As of September 2025, it has received more than 1.8 billion views on YouTube.

== Usage in media ==
"I'm the One" is featured and remixed in YouTube Rewind: The Shape of 2017.

== Track listing ==
Digital download
No.	Title	Length
1.	"I'm the One" (featuring Justin Bieber, Quavo, Chance the Rapper and Lil Wayne)	4:48

== Charts ==
=== Weekly charts ===
Chart (2017–2018)	Peak position
Australia (ARIA)	1
Australia Urban (ARIA)	1
Austria (Ö3 Austria Top 40)	2
Belgium (Ultratop 50 Flanders)	10
Belgium Urban (Ultratop Flanders)	2
Belgium (Ultratop 50 Wallonia)	17
Brazil (Brasil Hot 100 Airplay)	10
Canada Hot 100 (Billboard)	1
Canada CHR/Top 40 (Billboard)	4
Canada Hot AC (Billboard)	34
Colombia (National-Report)	46
Czech Republic Airplay (ČNS IFPI)	9
Czech Republic Singles Digital (ČNS IFPI)	3
Denmark (Tracklisten)	2
Euro Digital Song Sales (Billboard)	2
Finland (Suomen virallinen lista)	5
France (SNEP)	7
Germany (GfK)	4
Hungary (Rádiós Top 40)	29
Hungary (Single Top 40)	12
Hungary (Stream Top 40)	5
Ireland (IRMA)	2
Italy (FIMI)	20
Japan Hot 100 (Billboard)	46
Lebanon (Lebanese Top 20)	3
Malaysia (RIM)	4
Netherlands (Dutch Top 40)	2
Netherlands (Single Top 100)	4
New Zealand (Recorded Music NZ)	1
Norway (VG-lista)	3
Paraguay (Monitor Latino)	11
Philippines (Philippine Hot 100)	2
Portugal (AFP)	3
Scottish Singles Sales (Official Charts)	1
Slovakia Airplay (ČNS IFPI)	45
Slovakia Singles Digital (ČNS IFPI)	4
Slovenia (SloTop50)	46
South Korea International (Gaon)	7
Spain (Promusicae)	11
Sweden (Sverigetopplistan)	2
Switzerland (Schweizer Hitparade)	6
UK Singles (Official Charts)	1
US Billboard Hot 100	1
US Adult Pop Airplay (Billboard)	21
US Dance Club Songs (Billboard)	33
US Dance Airplay (Billboard)	4
US Hot R&B/Hip-Hop Songs (Billboard)	1
US Pop Airplay (Billboard)	3
US Rhythmic Airplay (Billboard)	1
Venezuela (National-Report)	29

2025 weekly chart performance for "I'm the One"
Chart (2025)	Peak position
Latvia Airplay (LaIPA)	12

=== Year-end charts ===
Chart (2017)	Position
Australia (ARIA)	13
Austria (Ö3 Austria Top 40)	30
Belgium (Ultratop Flanders)	57
Belgium (Ultratop Wallonia)	91
Brazil (Pro-Música Brasil)	78
Canada (Canadian Hot 100)	10
Denmark (Tracklisten)	8
France (SNEP)	55
Germany (Official German Charts)	40
Hungary (Single Top 40)	97
Hungary (Stream Top 40)	30
Italy (FIMI)	61
Netherlands (Dutch Top 40)	29
Netherlands (Single Top 100)	21
New Zealand (Recorded Music NZ)	7
Portugal (AFP)	21
Spain (PROMUSICAE)	94
Sweden (Sverigetopplistan)	17
Switzerland (Schweizer Hitparade)	57
UK Singles (Official Charts Company)	12
US Billboard Hot 100	12
US Dance/Mix Show Airplay (Billboard)	16
US Hot R&B/Hip-Hop Songs (Billboard)	3
US Mainstream Top 40 (Billboard)	21
US Rhythmic (Billboard)	9

== Certifications ==
Region	Certification	Certified units/sales
Australia (ARIA)	8× Platinum	560,000^{‡}
Austria (IFPI Austria)	Platinum	30,000^{‡}
Belgium (BRMA)	Platinum	20,000^{‡}
Brazil (Pro-Música Brasil)	Diamond	250,000^{‡}
Canada (Music Canada)	7× Platinum	560,000^{‡}
Denmark (IFPI Danmark)	2× Platinum	180,000^{‡}
France (SNEP)	Diamond	333,333^{‡}
Germany (BVMI)	Platinum	400,000^{‡}
Italy (FIMI)	2× Platinum	100,000^{‡}
Mexico (AMPROFON)	2× Platinum	120,000^{‡}
New Zealand (RMNZ)	5× Platinum	150,000^{‡}
Norway (IFPI Norway)	3× Platinum	180,000^{‡}
Poland (ZPAV)	Gold	10,000^{‡}
Portugal (AFP)	2× Platinum	20,000^{‡}
South Korea	—	236,117 (Note: Sales of "I'm the One" in South Korea as of November 2017.)
Spain (Promusicae)	Platinum	40,000^{‡}
Sweden (GLF)	4× Platinum	160,000^{‡}
Switzerland (IFPI Switzerland)	2× Platinum	40,000^{‡}
United Kingdom (BPI)	3× Platinum	1,800,000^{‡}
United States (RIAA)	Diamond	10,000,000^{‡}
Streaming
Japan (RIAJ)	Gold	50,000,000^{†}
^{‡} Sales+streaming figures based on certification alone.^{†} Streaming-only figures based on certification alone.

== Release history ==
Region	Date	Format	Label	Ref.
United States	April 28, 2017	Digital download	Epic	
Italy	April 28, 2017	Contemporary hit radio	Sony	
United States	May 2, 2017	Mainstream radio	Epic; We the Best	
United States	May 2, 2017	Rhythmic contemporary	Epic; We the Best	
United States	May 2, 2017	Top 40 radio	Epic; We the Best	
United Kingdom	May 4, 2017	Contemporary hit radio	RCA	

== See also ==
- List of Billboard Hot 100 number-one singles of 2017
- List of number-one R&B/hip-hop songs of 2017 (U.S.)
- List of number-one rap songs of 2017 (U.S.)
- List of number-one singles of 2017 (Australia)
- List of number-one urban singles of 2017 (Australia)
- List of Canadian Hot 100 number-one singles of 2017
- List of number-one singles from the 2010s (New Zealand)
- List of UK Singles Chart number ones of the 2010s
