= List of number-one urban singles of 2017 (Australia) =

ARIA Charts number-one urban singles of 2017 < 2016 2018 >

Other Australian number-one charts of 2017
- albums
- singles
- dance singles
- club tracks
- digital tracks
- streaming tracks

Top Australian singles and albums of 2017
- Triple J Hottest 100
- top 25 singles
- top 25 albums

The ARIA Urban Chart is a chart that ranks the best-performing Urban tracks singles of Australia. It is published by the Australian Recording Industry Association (ARIA), an organisation who collect music data for the weekly ARIA Charts. To be eligible to appear on the chart, the recording must be a single of a predominantly urban nature.

== Chart history ==
Issue date	Song	Artist(s)	Reference
2 January	"Starboy"	The Weeknd featuring Daft Punk	
9 January	"Starboy"	The Weeknd featuring Daft Punk	
16 January	"Starboy"	The Weeknd featuring Daft Punk	
23 January	"Starboy"	The Weeknd featuring Daft Punk	
30 January	"Starboy"	The Weeknd featuring Daft Punk	
6 February	"Starboy"	The Weeknd featuring Daft Punk	
13 February	"Starboy"	The Weeknd featuring Daft Punk	
20 February	"Now and Later"	Sage the Gemini	
27 February	"Starboy"	The Weeknd featuring Daft Punk	
6 March	"Now and Later"	Sage the Gemini	
13 March	"Starboy"	The Weeknd featuring Daft Punk	
20 March	"Starboy"	The Weeknd featuring Daft Punk	
27 March	"Starboy"	The Weeknd featuring Daft Punk	
3 April	"Mask Off"	Future	
10 April	"Humble"	Kendrick Lamar	
17 April	"Humble"	Kendrick Lamar	
24 April	"Humble"	Kendrick Lamar	
1 May	"Humble"	Kendrick Lamar	
8 May	"I'm the One"	DJ Khaled featuring Justin Bieber, Quavo, Chance the Rapper and Lil Wayne	
15 May	"I'm the One"	DJ Khaled featuring Justin Bieber, Quavo, Chance the Rapper and Lil Wayne	
22 May	"I'm the One"	DJ Khaled featuring Justin Bieber, Quavo, Chance the Rapper and Lil Wayne	
29 May	"I'm the One"	DJ Khaled featuring Justin Bieber, Quavo, Chance the Rapper and Lil Wayne	
5 June	"I'm the One"	DJ Khaled featuring Justin Bieber, Quavo, Chance the Rapper and Lil Wayne	
12 June	"I'm the One"	DJ Khaled featuring Justin Bieber, Quavo, Chance the Rapper and Lil Wayne	
19 June	"I'm the One"	DJ Khaled featuring Justin Bieber, Quavo, Chance the Rapper and Lil Wayne	
26 June	"Wild Thoughts"	DJ Khaled featuring Rihanna and Bryson Tiller	
3 July	"Wild Thoughts"	DJ Khaled featuring Rihanna and Bryson Tiller	
10 July	"Wild Thoughts"	DJ Khaled featuring Rihanna and Bryson Tiller	
17 July	"Wild Thoughts"	DJ Khaled featuring Rihanna and Bryson Tiller	
24 July	"Wild Thoughts"	DJ Khaled featuring Rihanna and Bryson Tiller	
31 July	"Wild Thoughts"	DJ Khaled featuring Rihanna and Bryson Tiller	
7 August	"Wild Thoughts"	DJ Khaled featuring Rihanna and Bryson Tiller	
14 August	"Wild Thoughts"	DJ Khaled featuring Rihanna and Bryson Tiller	
21 August	"Unforgettable"	French Montana featuring Swae Lee	
28 August	"Unforgettable"	French Montana featuring Swae Lee	
4 September	"Unforgettable"	French Montana featuring Swae Lee	
11 September	"Unforgettable"	French Montana featuring Swae Lee	
18 September	"1-800-273-8255"	Logic featuring Alessia Cara and Khalid	
25 September	"1-800-273-8255"	Logic featuring Alessia Cara and Khalid	
2 October	"Rockstar"	Post Malone featuring 21 Savage	
9 October	"Rockstar"	Post Malone featuring 21 Savage	
16 October	"Rockstar"	Post Malone featuring 21 Savage	
23 October	"Rockstar"	Post Malone featuring 21 Savage	
30 October	"Rockstar"	Post Malone featuring 21 Savage	
6 November	"Rockstar"	Post Malone featuring 21 Savage	
13 November	"Rockstar"	Post Malone featuring 21 Savage	
20 November	"Rockstar"	Post Malone featuring 21 Savage	
27 November	"Rockstar"	Post Malone featuring 21 Savage	
4 December	"Rockstar"	Post Malone featuring 21 Savage	
11 December	"Rockstar"	Post Malone featuring 21 Savage	
18 December	"Rockstar"	Post Malone featuring 21 Savage	
25 December	"River"	Eminem featuring Ed Sheeran	

== Number-one artists ==
Position	Artist	Weeks at No. 1
1	DJ Khaled	15
2	Post Malone	12
2	21 Savage (as featuring)	12
3	The Weeknd	11
3	Daft Punk (as featuring)	11
4	Rihanna (as featuring)	8
4	Bryson Tiller (as featuring)	8
5	Justin Bieber (as featuring)	7
5	Quavo (as featuring)	7
5	Chance the Rapper (as featuring)	7
5	Lil Wayne (as featuring)	7
6	Kendrick Lamar	4
6	French Montana	4
6	Swae Lee (as featuring)	4
7	Sage the Gemini	2
7	Logic	2
7	Alessia Cara (as featuring)	2
7	Khalid (as featuring)	2
8	Future	1
8	Eminem	1
8	Ed Sheeran (as featuring)	1

== See also ==
- 2017 in music
- List of number-one singles of 2017 (Australia)
- List of number-one urban singles of 2016 (Australia)
