= List of top 25 albums for 2017 in Australia =

Top 25 albums of 2017 < 2016 2018 >

Other Australian top charts for 2017
- top 25 singles
- Triple J Hottest 100

Australian number-one charts of 2017
- albums
- singles
- urban singles
- dance singles
- club tracks
- digital tracks
- streaming tracks

The following lists the top 25 albums of 2017 in Australia from the Australian Recording Industry Association (ARIA) end-of-year albums chart.

Ed Sheeran's album ÷ was the most popular album in Australia in 2017. The album spent 22 weeks at number 1 across the year and remained in the top 10 for the entire 43 weeks since release, selling over 420,000 copies. Adele's album 25 came in at number 4, after being number 1 in 2015 and 2016. Eleven soundtrack albums feature in top 100 with the most popular, Moana, charting at number 5. For the 7th year in a row, Michael Bublé's Christmas made the end of year top ten.

Paul Kelly's Life is Fine was the highest selling album by an Australian artist in 2017.

== Top 25 ==
#	Title	Artist	Highest pos. reached
1	÷	Ed Sheeran	1
2	Beautiful Trauma	P!nk	1
3	Reputation	Taylor Swift	1
4	25	Adele	1
5	Moana soundtrack	Various artists	2
6	Trolls soundtrack	Various artists	1
7	X	Ed Sheeran	1
8	Christmas	Michael Bublé	1
9	Guardians of the Galaxy Vol. 2	Various artists	2
10	Damn	Kendrick Lamar	2
11	Harry Styles	Harry Styles	1
12	+	Ed Sheeran	1
13	Melodrama	Lorde	1
14	Life Is Fine	Paul Kelly	1
15	Sing soundtrack	Various artists	2
16	24K Magic	Bruno Mars	3
17	Concrete and Gold	Foo Fighters	1
18	Guardians Of The Galaxy: Awesome Mix Vol. 1	Various artists	2
19	The Thrill of It All	Sam Smith	2
20	The Secret Daughter Season Two	Jessica Mauboy	2
21	Revival	Eminem	1
22	Friends for Christmas	John Farnham and Olivia Newton-John	1
23	Human	Rag'n'Bone Man	3
24	The Very Best	INXS	1
25	Ripcord	Keith Urban	1

- Note: 25, x, +, Friends for Christmas, The Very Best and Ripcord peaked at number 1 but not in 2017.

== See also ==
- List of number-one albums of 2017 (Australia)
- List of top 10 albums in 2017 (Australia)
- List of Top 25 singles for 2017 in Australia
- 2017 in music
- ARIA Charts
- List of Australian chart achievements and milestones
