= List of number-one albums of 2017 (Australia) =

ARIA Charts number-one albums of 2017 < 2016 2018 >

Other Australian number-one charts of 2017
- singles
- urban singles
- dance singles
- club tracks
- digital tracks
- streaming tracks

Top Australian singles and albums of 2017
- Triple J Hottest 100
- top 25 singles
- top 25 albums

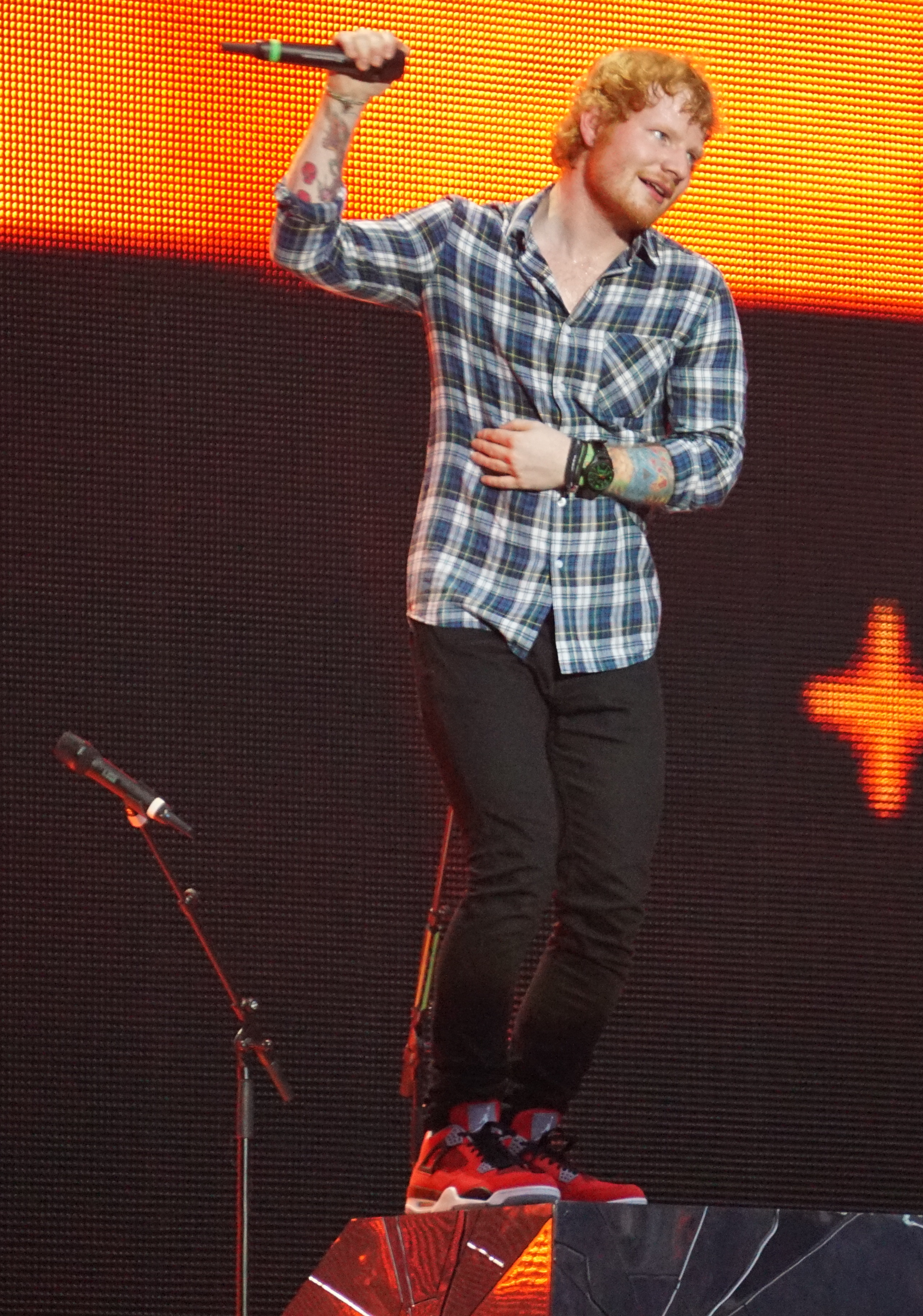
Ed Sheeran's ÷ spent a total of 21 non-consecutive weeks at number-one, the longest since Adele's 21 in 2011–12, spanning from March to December.

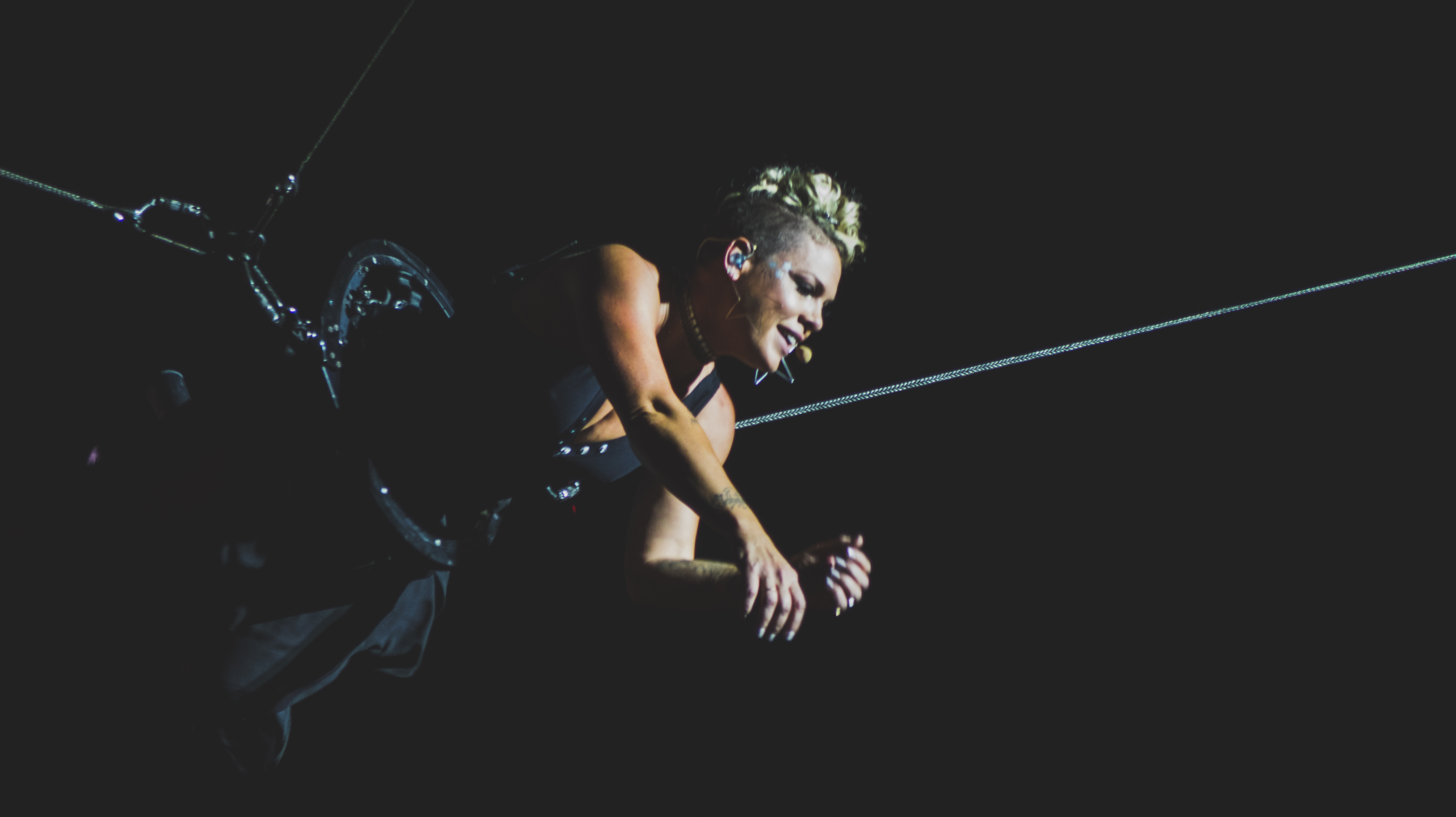
Pink earned her fifth number-one album with Beautiful Trauma, topping for six weeks as the year's second-longest.

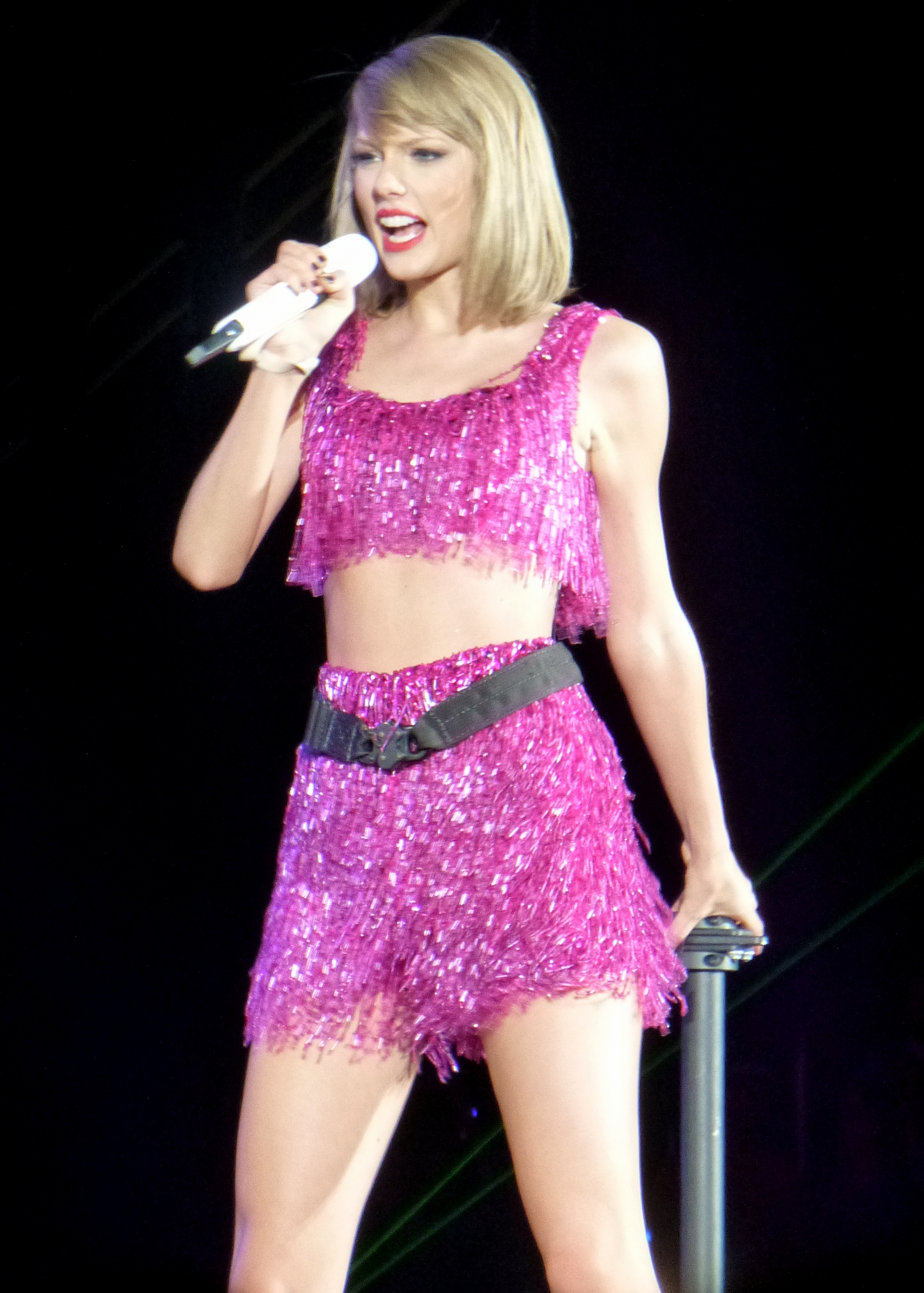
Taylor Swift (pictured) earned her fifth number-one album with Reputation, topping for two weeks as the year's third-longest. It, along with Pink's Beautiful Trauma and Ed Sheeran's ÷, were the only albums to top the charts for two (or more) weeks.

The ARIA Albums Chart ranks the best-performing albums and extended plays (EPs) in Australia. Its data, published by the Australian Recording Industry Association, is based collectively on the weekly physical and digital sales of albums and EPs. In 2017, 24 albums claimed the top spot, including Michael Bublé's Christmas, and seven acts, The xx, Dune Rats, Busby Marou, The Waifs, Harry Styles, Paul Kelly and Gang of Youths, achieved their first number-one album in Australia.

== Chart history ==
Key
The yellow background indicates the #1 album on ARIA's End of Year Albums Chart of 2017.

Date	Album	Artist(s)	Ref.
2 January	Christmas	Michael Bublé	
9 January	Trolls: Original Motion Picture Soundtrack	Various artists	
16 January	Trolls: Original Motion Picture Soundtrack	Various artists	
23 January	I See You	The xx	
30 January	Dragonfly	Kasey Chambers	
6 February	Trolls: Original Motion Picture Soundtrack	Various artists	
13 February	The Kids Will Know It's Bullshit	Dune Rats	
20 February	Fifty Shades Darker: Original Motion Picture Soundtrack	Various artists	
27 February	Postcards from the Shell House	Busby Marou	
6 March	Ironbark	The Waifs	
13 March	÷	Ed Sheeran	
20 March	÷	Ed Sheeran	
27 March	÷	Ed Sheeran	
3 April	÷	Ed Sheeran	
10 April	÷	Ed Sheeran	
17 April	÷	Ed Sheeran	
24 April	÷	Ed Sheeran	
1 May	÷	Ed Sheeran	
8 May	Off the Grid	Bliss n Eso	
15 May	÷	Ed Sheeran	
22 May	Harry Styles	Harry Styles	
29 May	÷	Ed Sheeran	
5 June	÷	Ed Sheeran	
12 June	÷	Ed Sheeran	
19 June	÷	Ed Sheeran	
26 June	Melodrama	Lorde	
3 July	÷	Ed Sheeran	
10 July	÷	Ed Sheeran	
17 July	÷	Ed Sheeran	
24 July	÷	Ed Sheeran	
31 July	Lust for Life	Lana Del Rey	
7 August	÷	Ed Sheeran	
14 August	÷	Ed Sheeran	
21 August	Life Is Fine	Paul Kelly	
28 August	Go Farther in Lightness	Gang of Youths	
4 September	Villains	Queens of the Stone Age	
11 September	÷	Ed Sheeran	
18 September	ARIA Number 1 Hits in Symphony	Anthony Callea featuring the Melbourne Symphony Orchestra	
25 September	Concrete and Gold	Foo Fighters	
2 October	Wonderful Wonderful	The Killers	
9 October	Now	Shania Twain	
16 October	Triple J's Like a Version Volume 13	Various artists	
23 October	Beautiful Trauma	Pink	
30 October	Beautiful Trauma	Pink	
6 November	Beautiful Trauma	Pink	
13 November	Beautiful Trauma	Pink	
20 November	Reputation	Taylor Swift	
27 November	Reputation	Taylor Swift	
4 December	Beautiful Trauma	Pink	
11 December	Beautiful Trauma	Pink	
18 December	÷	Ed Sheeran	
25 December	Revival	Eminem	

== Number-one artists ==
Position	Artist	Weeks at No. 1
1	Ed Sheeran	21
2	Pink	6
3	Taylor Swift	2
4	Michael Bublé	1
4	The xx	1
4	Kasey Chambers	1
4	Dune Rats	1
4	Busby Marou	1
4	The Waifs	1
4	Bliss n Eso	1
4	Harry Styles	1
4	Lorde	1
4	Lana Del Rey	1
4	Paul Kelly	1
4	Gang of Youths	1
4	Queens of the Stone Age	1
4	Anthony Callea	1
4	Foo Fighters	1
4	The Killers	1
4	Shania Twain	1
4	Eminem	1

== See also ==
- 2017 in music
- List of number-one singles of 2017 (Australia)
- List of top 10 albums in 2017 (Australia)
