= List of number-one club tracks of 2017 (Australia) =

ARIA Charts number-one club tracks of 2017 < 2016 2018 >

Other Australian number-one charts of 2017
- albums
- singles
- urban singles
- dance singles
- digital tracks
- streaming tracks

Top Australian singles and albums of 2017
- Triple J Hottest 100
- top 25 singles
- top 25 albums

This is the list of number-one tracks on the ARIA Club Chart in 2017, compiled by the Australian Recording Industry Association (ARIA) from weekly DJ reports.

== 2017 ==
Date		Song	Artist(s)	Reference
January	2	"Chameleon"	Pnau	
January	9	"Chameleon"	Pnau	
January	16	"Chameleon"	Pnau	
January	23	"Chameleon"	Pnau	
January	30	"Chameleon"	Pnau	
February	6	"Chameleon"	Pnau	
February	13	"Fallen"	Lo'99 and Marshall F	
February	20	"Fallen"	Lo'99 and Marshall F	
February	27	"Fallen"	Lo'99 and Marshall F	
March	6	"Fallen"	Lo'99 and Marshall F	
March	13	"Fallen"	Lo'99 and Marshall F	
March	20	"Fried Chicken"	Armand Van Helden and KOMES	
March	27	"Fried Chicken"	Armand Van Helden and KOMES	
April	3	"Fried Chicken"	Armand Van Helden and KOMES	
April	10	"You Can Call Me Al"	Murph & Petch featuring Livingstone	
April	17	"Love Addict"	Colour Castle	
April	24	"Love Addict"	Colour Castle	
May	1	"Love Addict"	Colour Castle	
May	8	"Love Addict"	Colour Castle	
May	15	"Love Addict"	Colour Castle	
May	22	"Love Addict"	Colour Castle	
May	29	"Love Addict"	Colour Castle	
June	5	"Feel So Good"	Odd Mob	
June	12	"Feel So Good"	Odd Mob	
June	19	"Feel So Good"	Odd Mob	
June	26	"Feel So Good"	Odd Mob	
July	3	"Real Life"	Duke Dumont and Gorgon City	
July	10	"Real Life"	Duke Dumont and Gorgon City	
July	17	"Real Life"	Duke Dumont and Gorgon City	
July	24	"Real Life"	Duke Dumont and Gorgon City	
July	31	"Real Life"	Duke Dumont and Gorgon City	
August	7	"Be Randy"	Dom Dolla and Torren Foot	
August	14	"Be Randy"	Dom Dolla and Torren Foot	
August	21	"Shiny Disco Balls"	Vandalism	
August	28	"Shiny Disco Balls"	Vandalism	
September	4	"Cola"	CamelPhat and Elderbrook	
September	11	"Cola"	CamelPhat and Elderbrook	
September	18	"Cola"	CamelPhat and Elderbrook	
September	25	"Cola"	CamelPhat and Elderbrook	
October	2	"Cola"	CamelPhat and Elderbrook	
October	9	"Cola"	CamelPhat and Elderbrook	
October	16	"I Know a Place"	Miguel Campbell and Colour Castle	
October	23	"I Know a Place"	Miguel Campbell and Colour Castle	
October	30	"I Know a Place"	Miguel Campbell and Colour Castle	
November	6	"I Know a Place"	Miguel Campbell and Colour Castle	
November	13	"From the Start"	Lo'99 featuring Elizabeth Rose	
November	20	"From the Start"	Lo'99 featuring Elizabeth Rose	
November	27	"From the Start"	Lo'99 featuring Elizabeth Rose	
December	4	"From the Start"	Lo'99 featuring Elizabeth Rose	
December	11	"Go Bang"	Pnau	
December	18	"Go Bang"	Pnau	
December	25	"Go Bang"	Pnau	

== Number-one artists ==
Position	Artist	Weeks at No. 1
1	Colour Castle	11
2	Lo'99	9
2	Pnau	9
3	CamelPhat	6
3	Elderbrook	6
4	Marshall F	5
4	Duke Dumont	5
4	Gorgon City	5
5	Odd Mob	4
5	Miguel Campbell	4
5	Elizabeth Rose	4
6	Armand Van Helden	3
6	KOMES	3
7	Dom Dolla	2
7	Torren Foot	2
7	Vandalism	2
8	Murph & Petch	1
8	Livingstone	1

== See also ==
- ARIA Charts
- List of number-one singles of 2017 (Australia)
- List of number-one albums of 2017 (Australia)
- List of number-one dance singles of 2017 (Australia)
- 2017 in music
