= List of number-one singles of 2017 (Australia) =

ARIA Charts number-one singles of 2017 < 2016 2018 >

Other Australian number-one charts of 2017
- albums
- urban singles
- dance singles
- club tracks
- digital tracks
- streaming tracks

Top Australian singles and albums of 2017
- Triple J Hottest 100
- top 25 singles
- top 25 albums

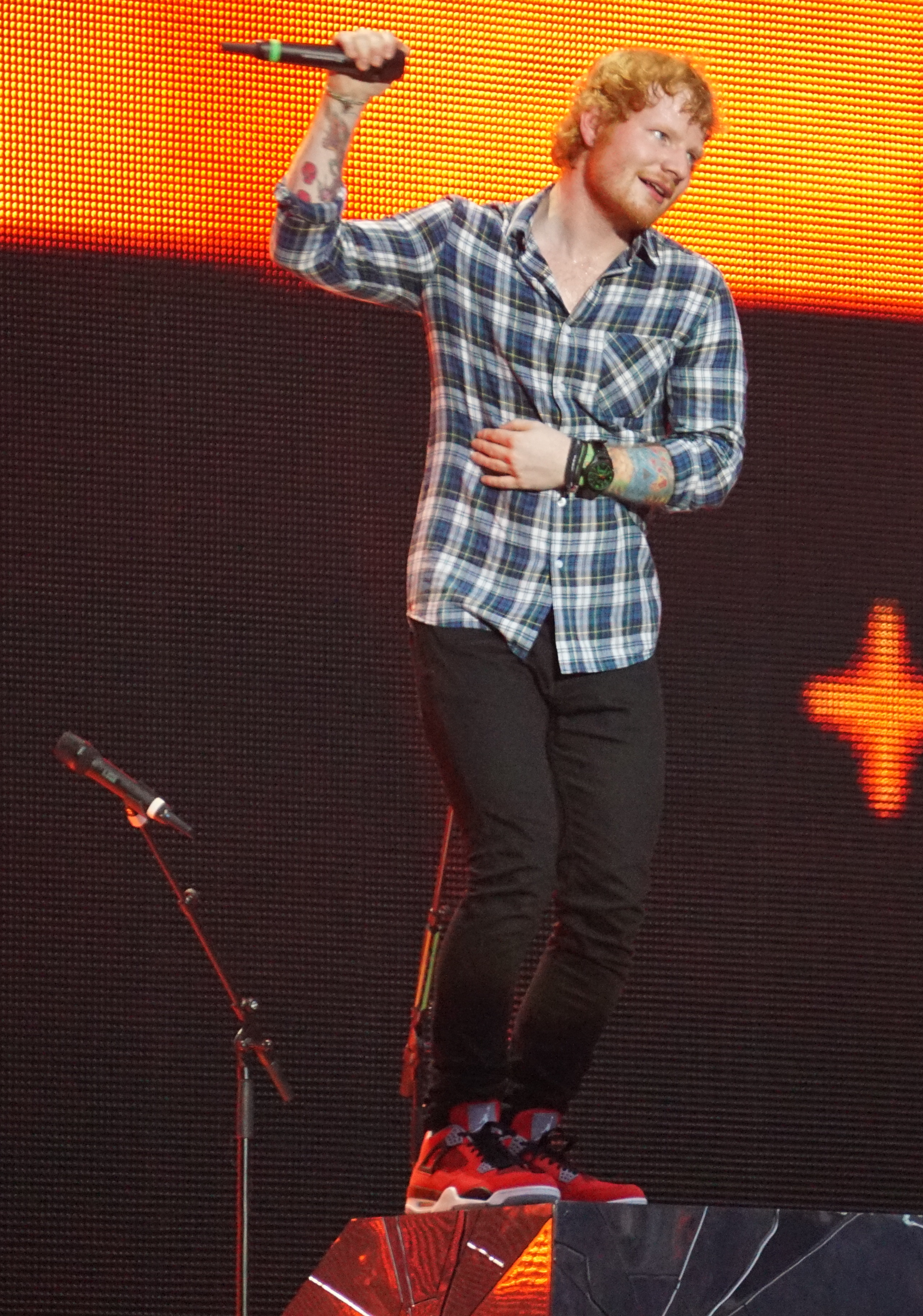
Ed Sheeran spent 15 weeks at number-one with "Shape of You", becoming the longest-topping single since the ARIA Charts began in 1988, followed by another three weeks with "Perfect". 2017 brought Sheeran's second pair of topping singles, after "Sing" and "Thinking Out Loud" in 2014.

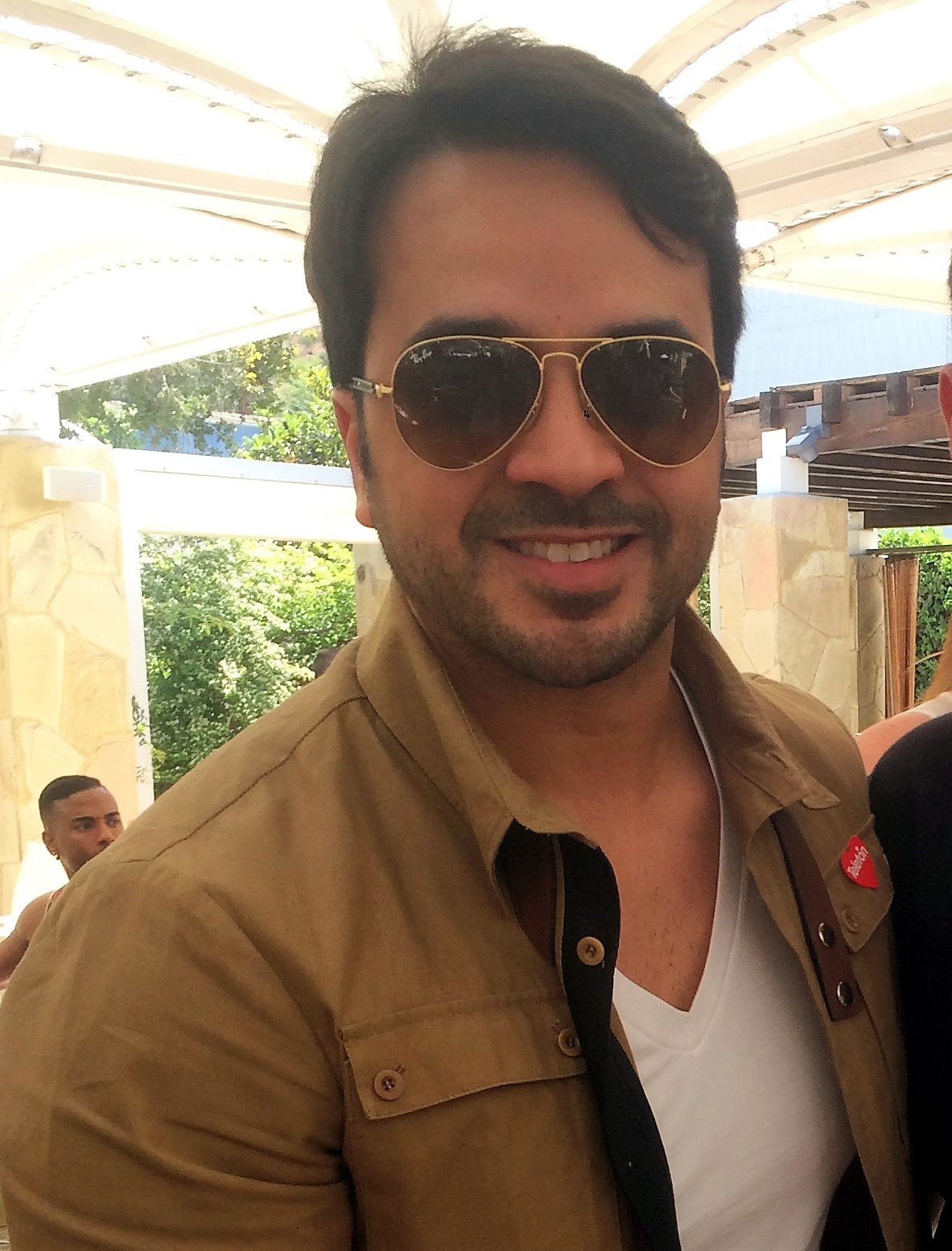
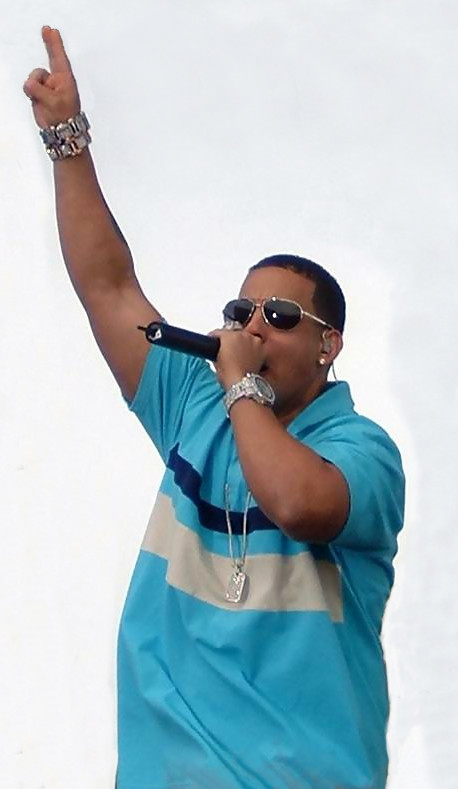
Luis Fonsi (left) and Daddy Yankee (right) topped the chart for 13 weeks with "Despacito", as the first Puerto Rican artists to top, with the first song sung primarily in Spanish to do so since Los del Río's "Macarena" in 1996.

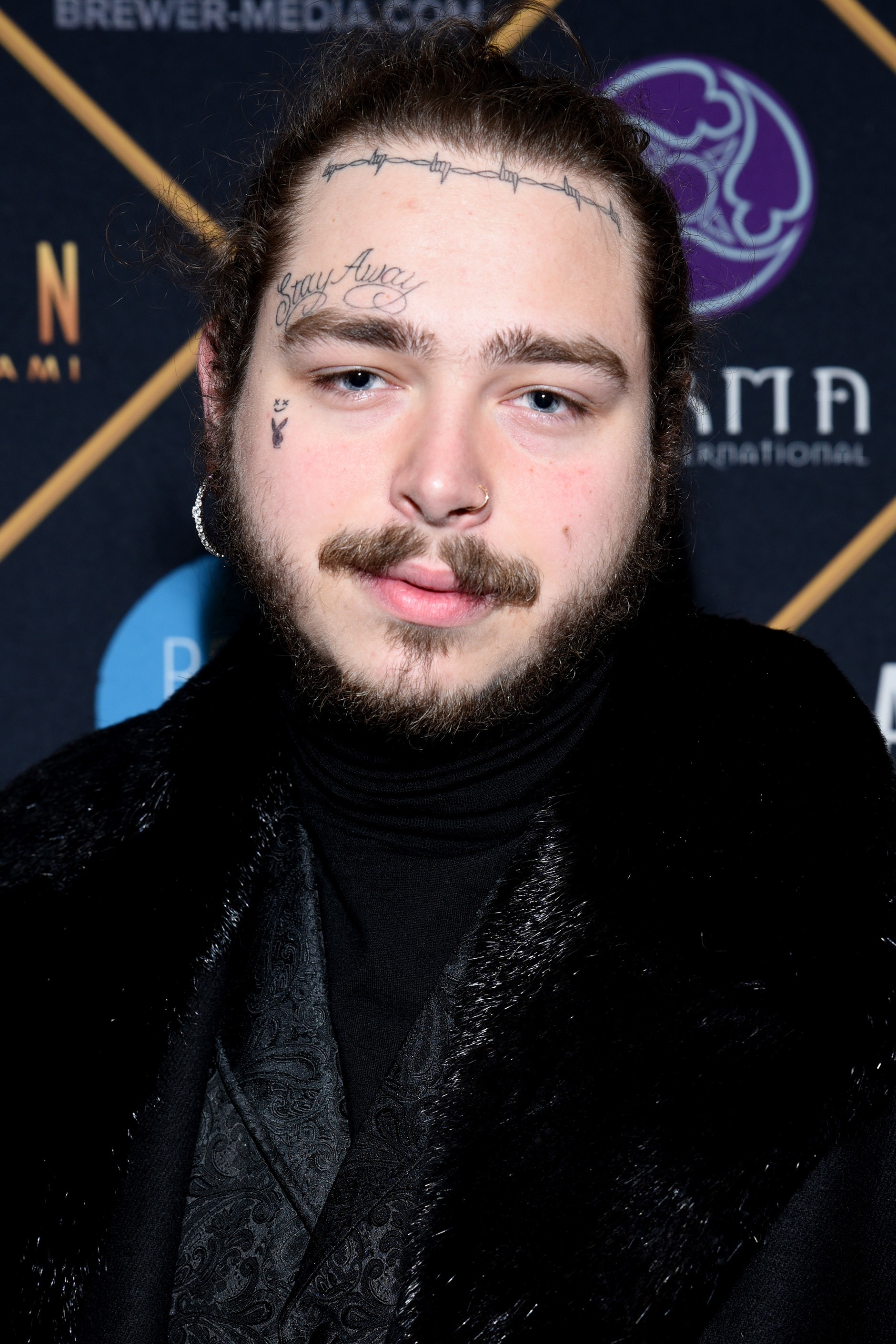
American rappers Post Malone (pictured) and 21 Savage earned their first Australian number-one with "Rockstar", topping the chart for seven consecutive weeks.

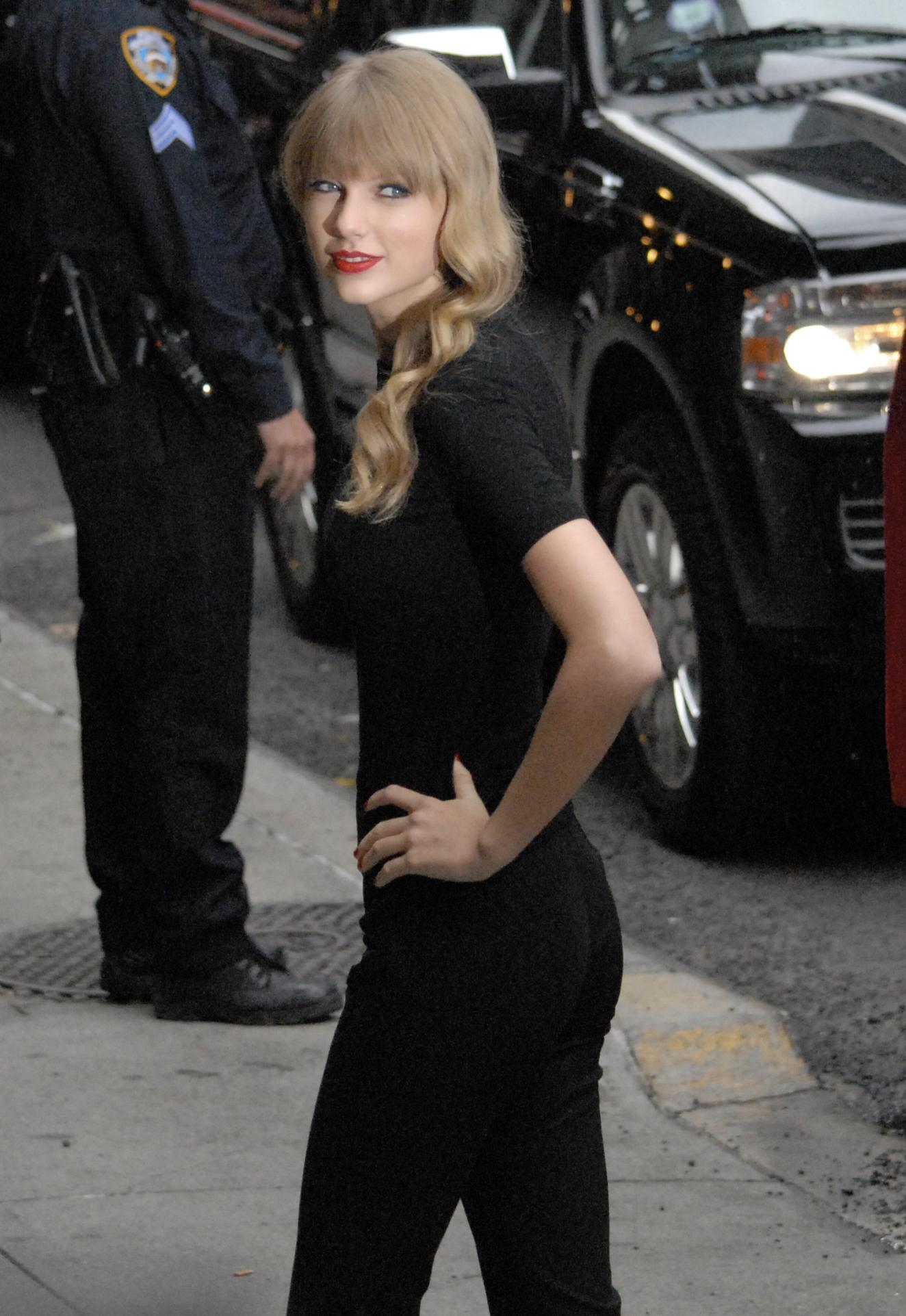
American singer Taylor Swift earned her fourth number 1 with her single "Look What You Made Me Do" which debuted at number 1 in September 2017.

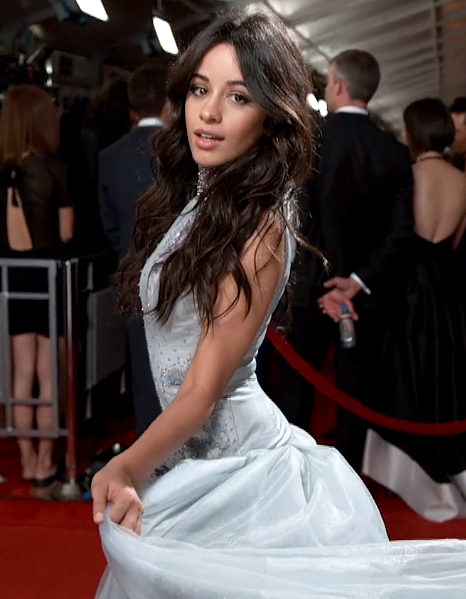
Cuban-American singer Camila Cabello earned her first number 1 with her single "Havana" which features a rap verse from American rapper Young Thug. It spent three weeks at number 1.

The ARIA Singles Chart ranks the best-performing singles in Australia. Its data, published by the Australian Recording Industry Association, is based collectively on the weekly physical and digital sales and streams of singles. In 2017, eleven singles claimed the top spot, including Clean Bandit's "Rockabye", which started its peak position in 2016, and Ed Sheeran's "Shape of You", which spent 15 non-consecutive weeks at number one, breaking the long-standing record in chart history previously held by ABBA's "Fernando" in 1976. Twelve acts, Harry Styles, DJ Khaled, Quavo, Chance the Rapper, Lil Wayne, Luis Fonsi, Daddy Yankee, Sam Smith, Post Malone, 21 Savage, Camila Cabello and Young Thug, reached the top spot for the first time. Pink achieved her ninth number one with "What About Us", and Taylor Swift achieved her fifth number one with "Look What You Made Me Do".

== Chart history ==
Key
The yellow background indicates the #1 song on ARIA's End of Year Singles Chart of 2017.

| Date | Song | Artist(s) | Ref. |
|---|---|---|---|
| 2 January | "Rockabye" | Clean Bandit featuring Sean Paul and Anne-Marie | |
| 9 January | "Rockabye" | Clean Bandit featuring Sean Paul and Anne-Marie | |
| 16 January | "Shape of You" | Ed Sheeran | |
| 23 January | "Shape of You" | Ed Sheeran | |
| 30 January | "Shape of You" | Ed Sheeran | |
| 6 February | "Shape of You" | Ed Sheeran | |
| 13 February | "Shape of You" | Ed Sheeran | |
| 20 February | "Shape of You" | Ed Sheeran | |
| 27 February | "Shape of You" | Ed Sheeran | |
| 6 March | "Shape of You" | Ed Sheeran | |
| 13 March | "Shape of You" | Ed Sheeran | |
| 20 March | "Shape of You" | Ed Sheeran | |
| 27 March | "Shape of You" | Ed Sheeran | |
| 3 April | "Shape of You" | Ed Sheeran | |
| 10 April | "Shape of You" | Ed Sheeran | |
| 17 April | "Sign of the Times" | Harry Styles | |
| 24 April | "Shape of You" | Ed Sheeran | |
| 1 May | "Shape of You" | Ed Sheeran | |
| 8 May | "I'm the One" | DJ Khaled featuring Justin Bieber, Quavo, Chance the Rapper and Lil Wayne | |
| 15 May | "I'm the One" | DJ Khaled featuring Justin Bieber, Quavo, Chance the Rapper and Lil Wayne | |
| 22 May | "Despacito" | Luis Fonsi and Daddy Yankee featuring Justin Bieber | |
| 29 May | "Despacito" | Luis Fonsi and Daddy Yankee featuring Justin Bieber | |
| 5 June | "Despacito" | Luis Fonsi and Daddy Yankee featuring Justin Bieber | |
| 12 June | "Despacito" | Luis Fonsi and Daddy Yankee featuring Justin Bieber | |
| 19 June | "Despacito" | Luis Fonsi and Daddy Yankee featuring Justin Bieber | |
| 26 June | "Despacito" | Luis Fonsi and Daddy Yankee featuring Justin Bieber | |
| 3 July | "Despacito" | Luis Fonsi and Daddy Yankee featuring Justin Bieber | |
| 10 July | "Despacito" | Luis Fonsi and Daddy Yankee featuring Justin Bieber | |
| 17 July | "Despacito" | Luis Fonsi and Daddy Yankee featuring Justin Bieber | |
| 24 July | "Despacito" | Luis Fonsi and Daddy Yankee featuring Justin Bieber | |
| 31 July | "Despacito" | Luis Fonsi and Daddy Yankee featuring Justin Bieber | |
| 7 August | "Despacito" | Luis Fonsi and Daddy Yankee featuring Justin Bieber | |
| 14 August | "Despacito" | Luis Fonsi and Daddy Yankee featuring Justin Bieber | |
| 21 August | "What About Us" | Pink | |
| 28 August | "What About Us" | Pink | |
| 4 September | "Look What You Made Me Do" | Taylor Swift | |
| 11 September | "Look What You Made Me Do" | Taylor Swift | |
| 18 September | "Too Good at Goodbyes" | Sam Smith | |
| 25 September | "Too Good at Goodbyes" | Sam Smith | |
| 2 October | "Rockstar" | Post Malone featuring 21 Savage | |
| 9 October | "Rockstar" | Post Malone featuring 21 Savage | |
| 16 October | "Rockstar" | Post Malone featuring 21 Savage | |
| 23 October | "Rockstar" | Post Malone featuring 21 Savage | |
| 30 October | "Rockstar" | Post Malone featuring 21 Savage | |
| 6 November | "Rockstar" | Post Malone featuring 21 Savage | |
| 13 November | "Rockstar" | Post Malone featuring 21 Savage | |
| 20 November | "Havana" | Camila Cabello featuring Young Thug | |
| 27 November | "Havana" | Camila Cabello featuring Young Thug | |
| 4 December | "Havana" | Camila Cabello featuring Young Thug | |
| 11 December | "Perfect" | Ed Sheeran | |
| 18 December | "Perfect" | Ed Sheeran | |
| 25 December | "Perfect" | Ed Sheeran | |

== Number-one artists ==
| Position | Artist | Weeks at No. 1 |
|---|---|---|
| 1 | Ed Sheeran | 18 |
| 2 | Justin Bieber (as featuring) | 15 |
| 3 | Luis Fonsi | 13 |
| 3 | Daddy Yankee | 13 |
| 4 | Post Malone | 7 |
| 4 | 21 Savage (as featuring) | 7 |
| 5 | Camila Cabello | 3 |
| 5 | Young Thug (as featuring) | 3 |
| 6 | Clean Bandit | 2 |
| 6 | Sean Paul (as featuring) | 2 |
| 6 | Anne-Marie (as featuring) | 2 |
| 6 | DJ Khaled | 2 |
| 6 | Quavo (as featuring) | 2 |
| 6 | Chance the Rapper (as featuring) | 2 |
| 6 | Lil Wayne (as featuring) | 2 |
| 6 | Pink | 2 |
| 6 | Taylor Swift | 2 |
| 6 | Sam Smith | 2 |
| 7 | Harry Styles | 1 |

== See also ==
- 2017 in music
- List of number-one albums of 2017 (Australia)
- List of top 10 singles in 2017 (Australia)
