= List of number-one dance singles of 2017 (Australia) =

ARIA Charts number-one dance singles of 2017 < 2016 2018 >

Other Australian number-one charts of 2017
- albums
- singles
- urban singles
- club tracks
- digital tracks
- streaming tracks

Top Australian singles and albums of 2017
- Triple J Hottest 100
- top 25 singles
- top 25 albums

The ARIA Dance Chart is a chart that ranks the best-performing dance singles of Australia. It is published by Australian Recording Industry Association (ARIA), an organisation who collect music data for the weekly ARIA Charts. To be eligible to appear on the chart, the recording must be a single, and be "predominantly of a dance nature, or with a featured track of a dance nature, or included in the ARIA Club Chart or a comparable overseas chart".

== Chart history ==
Date	Song	Artist(s)	Ref.
2 January	"Rockabye"	Clean Bandit featuring Sean Paul and Anne-Marie	
9 January	"Rockabye"	Clean Bandit featuring Sean Paul and Anne-Marie	
16 January	"Rockabye"	Clean Bandit featuring Sean Paul and Anne-Marie	
23 January	"Rockabye"	Clean Bandit featuring Sean Paul and Anne-Marie	
30 January	"Rockabye"	Clean Bandit featuring Sean Paul and Anne-Marie	
6 February	"Chameleon"	Pnau	
13 February	"Paris"	The Chainsmokers	
20 February	"Paris"	The Chainsmokers	
27 February	"Paris"	The Chainsmokers	
6 March	"Paris"	The Chainsmokers	
13 March	"Stay"	Zedd and Alessia Cara	
20 March	"Stay"	Zedd and Alessia Cara	
27 March	"Stay"	Zedd and Alessia Cara	
3 April	"Stay"	Zedd and Alessia Cara	
10 April	"Stay"	Zedd and Alessia Cara	
17 April	"Stay"	Zedd and Alessia Cara	
24 April	"Symphony"	Clean Bandit featuring Zara Larsson	
1 May	"Symphony"	Clean Bandit featuring Zara Larsson	
8 May	"Symphony"	Clean Bandit featuring Zara Larsson	
15 May	"Symphony"	Clean Bandit featuring Zara Larsson	
22 May	"Symphony"	Clean Bandit featuring Zara Larsson	
29 May	"Symphony"	Clean Bandit featuring Zara Larsson	
5 June	"Symphony"	Clean Bandit featuring Zara Larsson	
12 June	"Symphony"	Clean Bandit featuring Zara Larsson	
19 June	"2U"	David Guetta featuring Justin Bieber	
26 June	"2U"	David Guetta featuring Justin Bieber	
3 July	"Mama"	Jonas Blue featuring William Singe	
10 July	"Mama"	Jonas Blue featuring William Singe	
17 July	"Feels"	Calvin Harris featuring Pharrell Williams, Katy Perry and Big Sean	
24 July	"Feels"	Calvin Harris featuring Pharrell Williams, Katy Perry and Big Sean	
31 July	"Feels"	Calvin Harris featuring Pharrell Williams, Katy Perry and Big Sean	
7 August	"Feels"	Calvin Harris featuring Pharrell Williams, Katy Perry and Big Sean	
14 August	"Feels"	Calvin Harris featuring Pharrell Williams, Katy Perry and Big Sean	
21 August	"Feels"	Calvin Harris featuring Pharrell Williams, Katy Perry and Big Sean	
28 August	"Feels"	Calvin Harris featuring Pharrell Williams, Katy Perry and Big Sean	
4 September	"Feels"	Calvin Harris featuring Pharrell Williams, Katy Perry and Big Sean	
11 September	"Feels"	Calvin Harris featuring Pharrell Williams, Katy Perry and Big Sean	
18 September	"Feels"	Calvin Harris featuring Pharrell Williams, Katy Perry and Big Sean	
25 September	"Feels"	Calvin Harris featuring Pharrell Williams, Katy Perry and Big Sean	
2 October	"Feels"	Calvin Harris featuring Pharrell Williams, Katy Perry and Big Sean	
9 October	"Silence"	Marshmello featuring Khalid	
16 October	"Silence"	Marshmello featuring Khalid	
23 October	"Silence"	Marshmello featuring Khalid	
30 October	"Silence"	Marshmello featuring Khalid	
6 November	"Silence"	Marshmello featuring Khalid	
13 November	"Silence"	Marshmello featuring Khalid	
20 November	"Silence"	Marshmello featuring Khalid	
27 November	"Silence"	Marshmello featuring Khalid	
4 December	"Silence"	Marshmello featuring Khalid	
11 December	"Silence"	Marshmello featuring Khalid	
18 December	"Silence"	Marshmello featuring Khalid	
25 December	"Silence"	Marshmello featuring Khalid	

== Number-one artists ==
Position	Artist	Weeks at No. 1
1	Clean Bandit	13
2	Calvin Harris	12
2	Pharrell Williams (as featuring)	12
2	Katy Perry (as featuring)	12
2	Marshmello	12
3	Zara Larsson (as featuring)	8
4	Zedd	6
4	Alessia Cara	6
5	Sean Paul (as featuring)	5
5	Anne-Marie (as featuring)	5
6	The Chainsmokers	4
7	David Guetta	2
7	Jonas Blue	2
7	William Singe (as featuring)	2
8	Pnau	1

== See also ==
- ARIA Charts
- List of number-one singles of 2017 (Australia)
- List of number-one albums of 2017 (Australia)
- List of number-one club tracks of 2017 (Australia)
- 2017 in music
