= List of number-one digital albums of 2018 (Australia) =

ARIA Charts number-one digital albums of 2018 < 2017 2019 >

Other Australian number-one charts of 2018
- albums
- singles
- urban singles
- dance singles
- club tracks
- digital tracks
- streaming tracks

Top Australian singles and albums of 2018
- Triple J Hottest 100
- top 25 singles
- top 25 albums

The ARIA Digital Album Chart ranks the best-performing albums and extended plays (EPs) in Australia. Its data, published by the Australian Recording Industry Association, is based collectively on the weekly digital sales of albums and EPs.

== Chart history ==
Date	Album	Artist(s)	Ref.
1 January	Christmas	Michael Bublé	
8 January	The Greatest Showman: Original Motion Picture Soundtrack	Various Artists	
15 January	The Greatest Showman: Original Motion Picture Soundtrack	Various Artists	
22 January	The Greatest Showman: Original Motion Picture Soundtrack	Various Artists	
29 January	The Greatest Showman: Original Motion Picture Soundtrack	Various Artists	
5 February	The Greatest Showman: Original Motion Picture Soundtrack	Various Artists	
12 February	The Greatest Showman: Original Motion Picture Soundtrack	Various Artists	
19 February	The Greatest Showman: Original Motion Picture Soundtrack	Various Artists	
26 February	The Greatest Showman: Original Motion Picture Soundtrack	Various Artists	
5 March	Nation of Two	Vance Joy	
12 March	÷	Ed Sheeran	
19 March	Nursery Rhymes 2	The Wiggles	
26 March	÷	Ed Sheeran	
2 April	÷	Ed Sheeran	
9 April	My Dear Melancholy,	The Weeknd	
16 April	Golden	Kylie Minogue	
23 April	Djarimirri (Child of the Rainbow)	Geoffrey Gurrumul Yunupingu	
30 April	Eat the Elephant	A Perfect Circle	
7 May	Graffiti U	Keith Urban	
14 May	Reverence	Parkway Drive	
21 May	The Greatest Showman: Original Motion Picture Soundtrack	Various Artists	
28 May	Love Yourself: Tear	BTS	
4 June	Shawn Mendes	Shawn Mendes	
11 June	Ye	Kanye West	
18 June	The Greatest Showman: Original Motion Picture Soundtrack	Various Artists	
25 June	Youngblood	5 Seconds of Summer	
2 July	Pray for the Wicked	Panic! at the Disco	
9 July	Scorpion	Drake	
16 July	Scorpion	Drake	
23 July	Love Monster	Amy Shark	
30 July	The Greatest Showman: Original Motion Picture Soundtrack	Various Artists	
6 August	Mamma Mia! Here We Go Again: The Movie Soundtrack	Various Artists	
13 August	Astroworld	Travis Scott	
20 August	Queen	Nicki Minaj	
27 August	Sweetener	Ariana Grande	
3 September	Misery	The Amity Affliction	
10 September	Kamikaze	Eminem	
17 September	Kamikaze	Eminem	
24 September	Kamikaze	Eminem	
1 October	Kamikaze	Eminem	
8 October	Dancing Queen	Cher	
15 October	Trench	Twenty One Pilots	
22 October	A Star Is Born	Lady Gaga and Bradley Cooper	
29 October	A Star Is Born	Lady Gaga and Bradley Cooper	
5 November	A Star Is Born	Lady Gaga and Bradley Cooper	
12 November	A Star Is Born	Lady Gaga and Bradley Cooper	
19 November	A Star Is Born	Lady Gaga and Bradley Cooper	
26 November	The Greatest Showman Reimagined	Various Artists	
3 December	A Star Is Born	Lady Gaga and Bradley Cooper	
10 December	Christmas	Michael Bublé	
17 December	Christmas	Michael Bublé	
24 December	Christmas	Michael Bublé	
31 December	Christmas	Michael Bublé	

== Number-one artists ==
Position	Artist	Weeks at No. 1
1	Lady Gaga	6
1	Bradley Cooper	6
2	Michael Bublé	5
3	Eminem	4
4	Ed Sheeran	3
5	Drake	2
6	5 Seconds of Summer	1
6	The Amity Affliction	1
6	Amy Shark	1
6	Ariana Grande	1
6	BTS	1
6	Cher	1
6	Geoffrey Gurrumul Yunupingu	1
6	Kanye West	1
6	Keith Urban	1
6	Kylie Minogue	1
6	Nicki Minaj	1
6	Panic! At the Disco	1
6	Parkway Drive	1
6	A Perfect Circle	1
6	Shawn Mendes	1
6	Travis Scott	1
6	Twenty One Pilots	1
6	Vance Joy	1
6	The Weeknd	1
6	The Wiggles	1

== See also ==
- 2018 in music
- ARIA Charts
- List of number-one singles of 2018 (Australia)
