= 2018 in Australian music =

The following is a list of notable events and releases that happened in 2018, in music in Australia.

== Events ==
=== March ===
- 24 March – Download Festival is held in Australia for the first time at Flemington Racecourse in Melbourne. The inaugural festival is headlined by Korn, Prophets of Rage, NOFX and Arch Enemy.

=== May ===
- 12 May – Australia's representative in the Eurovision Song Contest 2018, Jessica Mauboy, finishes in 20th place with 99 points for the song "We Got Love".

=== July ===
- 20–22 July – Splendour in the Grass 2018 is held at North Byron Parklands in Yelgun, New South Wales, headlined by Kendrick Lamar, Lorde and Vampire Weekend.

== Deaths ==
- 6 March – Jeff St John, 71, singer
- 24 April – Paul Gray, 54, musician, songwriter, singer
- 24 May – Phil Emmanuel, 65, musician
- 2 September – Conway Savage, 58, musician, singer-songwriter, composer
- 2 October – Michael Weiley, 59, musician

== See also ==
- Australia in the Eurovision Song Contest 2018
- List of number-one singles of 2018 (Australia)
- List of number-one albums of 2018 (Australia)
