= List of top 10 albums for 2018 in Australia =

This is a list of albums that charted in the top ten of the ARIA Album Charts, an all-genre albums chart, in 2018.

== Top-ten albums ==
The list is sorted chronologically by issue date with the date representing the first issue in which the album appeared in the top ten in 2018, regardless of whether an album charted in a previous year or not. Dates reached peak position are in 2018 unless otherwise noted.

Key

An asterisk (*) represents that the album is in the top ten as of the week ending on 17 December 2018.

Issue date	Album		Peak		Weeks in the top 10	
Issue date	Title	Artist(s)	Position	Date	In 2018	Overall
1 January	÷	Ed Sheeran	1	13 March 2017	46	88
1 January	Beautiful Trauma	Pink	1	23 October 2017	14	24
1 January	Revival	Eminem	1	25 December 2017	10	11
1 January	Christmas	Michael Bublé	1	5 December 2011	4*	50*
1 January	Reputation	Taylor Swift	1	20 November 2017	9	15
1 January	Friends for Christmas	John Farnham and Olivia Newton-John	1	19 December 2016	2*	14*
1 January	The Thrill of It All	Sam Smith	2	13 November 2017	5	12
1 January	The Greatest Showman	Various Artists	1	8 January	46*	46*
1 January	The Secret Daughter Season Two	Jessica Mauboy	2	16 October 2017	1	12
1 January	Life Is Fine	Paul Kelly	1	21 August 2017	1	10
8 January	Gumboot Soup	King Gizzard & the Lizard Wizard	6	8 January	1	1
8 January	Pitch Perfect 3	Various Artists	7	8 January	3	3
8 January	Evolve	Imagine Dragons	4	3 July 2017	4	10
8 January	Stoney	Post Malone	5	12 February	12	16
15 January	Moana	Various Artists	2	10 April 2017	1	23
22 January	Camila	Camila Cabello	3	22 January	3	3
22 January	Stars	The Cranberries	8	22 January	1	1
29 January	Mania	Fall Out Boy	3	29 January	1	1
5 February	Go Farther in Lightness	Gang of Youths	1	28 August 2017	2	7
5 February	Greatest Hits	Foo Fighters	1	9 November 2009	1	14
5 February	Catharsis	Machine Head	10	5 February	1	1
12 February	Man of the Woods	Justin Timberlake	2	12 February	2	2
12 February	Bloody Lovely	DZ Deathrays	4	12 February	1	1
12 February	Unbroken	Shannon Noll	7	12 February	1	1
19 February	Black Panther	Kendrick Lamar and Various Artists	2	19 February	8	8
19 February	Fifty Shades Freed	Various Artists	4	19 February	4	4
19 February	Beautiful People Will Ruin Your Life	The Wombats	5	19 February	1	1
19 February	Blend Inn	Hockey Dad	6	19 February	1	1
26 February	Good Mood	Ball Park Music	5	26 February	1	1
26 February	Make Way for Love	Marlon Williams	8	26 February	1	1
26 February	X	Ed Sheeran	1	30 June 2014	12	116
5 March	Nation of Two	Vance Joy	1	5 March	4	4
5 March	Depth of Field	Sarah Blasko	5	5 March	1	1
12 March	How to Socialise & Make Friends	Camp Cope	6	12 March	1	1
12 March	+	Ed Sheeran	1	13 August 2012	5	45
12 March	24K Magic	Bruno Mars	3	28 November 2016	5	14
19 March	Nursery Rhymes 2	The Wiggles	3	19 March	1	1
19 March	Only Human	Calum Scott	5	19 March	2	2
19 March	Bobby Tarantino II	Logic	10	19 March	1	1
26 March	?	XXXTentacion	2	2 July	12	12
26 March	Dua Lipa	Dua Lipa	8	9 April	2	2
2 April	I Hear a Song	Dami Im	3	2 April	1	1
2 April	Staying at Tamara's	George Ezra	7	2 April	1	1
2 April	Country Heart	The Wolfe Brothers	9	2 April	1	1
9 April	My Dear Melancholy,	The Weeknd	3	9 April	3	3
16 April	Golden	Kylie Minogue	1	16 April	3	3
16 April	There Is More	Hillsong Worship	2	16 April	1	1
16 April	Revamp	Various Artists	5	16 April	3	3
16 April	Invasion of Privacy	Cardi B	5	23 April	3	3
16 April	Awake	Alison Wonderland	7	16 April	1	1
16 April	America	Thirty Seconds to Mars	10	16 April	1	1
23 April	Djarimirri	Geoffrey Gurrumul Yunupingu	1	23 April	4	4
23 April	Ember	Breaking Benjamin	9	23 April	1	1
23 April	Rearview Town	Jason Aldean	10	23 April	1	1
30 April	KOD	J. Cole	1	30 April	3	3
30 April	Eat the Elephant	A Perfect Circle	2	30 April	1	1
30 April	Best of My Love	Samantha Jade	6	30 April	1	1
7 May	Beerbongs & Bentleys	Post Malone	1	7 May	24	24
7 May	Graffiti U	Keith Urban	2	7 May	6	6
7 May	Solastalgia	Missy Higgins	3	7 May	3	3
7 May	Campfire	Kasey Chambers and The Fireside Disciples	6	7 May	1	1
7 May	For Now	DMA's	7	7 May	1	1
14 May	Reverence	Parkway Drive	1	14 May	2	2
14 May	Good Thing	Leon Bridges	8	14 May	1	1
14 May	Lost Friends	Middle Kids	10	14 May	1	1
21 May	Tranquility Base Hotel & Casino	Arctic Monkeys	1	21 May	2	2
21 May	I Honestly Love You	Delta Goodrem	4	21 May	1	1
21 May	Voicenotes	Charlie Puth	7	21 May	1	1
21 May	Disobey	Bad Wolves	9	21 May	1	1
28 May	Tell Me How You Really Feel	Courtney Barnett	2	28 May	1	1
28 May	And Justice for None	Five Finger Death Punch	4	28 May	2	2
28 May	Love Yourself: Tear	BTS	6	28 May	1	1
28 May	Deadpool 2	Various Artists	9	28 May	1	1
4 June	Shawn Mendes	Shawn Mendes	1	4 June	9	9
4 June	Testing	A$AP Rocky	5	4 June	1	1
4 June	Storm Boy	Xavier Rudd	6	4 June	1	1
4 June	Love Is Dead	Chvrches	7	4 June	1	1
4 June	1989	Taylor Swift	1	3 November 2014	1	70
11 June	Ye	Kanye West	1	11 June	3	3
11 June	Hi Viz	The Presets	5	11 June	2	2
11 June	Prequelle	Ghost	7	11 June	1	1
11 June	This One's for You	Luke Combs	8	11 June	1	1
11 June	God's Favorite Customer	Father John Misty	9	11 June	1	1
18 June	Watching the Sky	Sheppard	1	18 June	1	1
18 June	Kids See Ghosts	Kanye West and Kid Cudi	4	18 June	1	1
18 June	No Shame	Lily Allen	8	18 June	1	1
25 June	Youngblood	5 Seconds of Summer	1	25 June	2	2
25 June	Everything Is Love	Beyoncé and Jay-Z	6	25 June	2	2
25 June	Liberation	Christina Aguilera	9	25 June	1	1
2 July	Pray for the Wicked	Panic! At the Disco	1	2 July	2	2
2 July	Bad Witch	Nine Inch Nails	9	2 July	1	1
2 July	Stay	Luca Brasi	10	2 July	1	1
9 July	Scorpion	Drake	1	9 July	16	16
9 July	High as Hope	Florence and the Machine	2	9 July	2	2
9 July	Lo La Ru	The Rubens	3	9 July	1	1
9 July	The Now Now	Gorillaz	4	9 July	1	1
9 July	Appetite for Destruction	Guns N' Roses	7	24 October 1988	1	5
9 July	Gravity	Bullet for My Valentine	10	9 July	1	1
16 July	The Best So Far... 2018 Tour Edition	Celine Dion	4	6 August	4	4
23 July	Love Monster	Amy Shark	1	23 July	6	6
23 July	Mamma Mia! Here We Go Again	Various Artists	1	30 July	7	7
23 July	Milestones... 20 Years	Adam Brand	6	23 July	1	1
30 July	Greatest Hits... So Far!!!	Pink	1	22 November 2010	1	29
6 August	The Nashville Tapes	Adam Harvey	9	6 August	1	1
13 August	Astroworld	Travis Scott	1	13 August	4	4
13 August	The American Dream	Trophy Eyes	8	13 August	1	1
20 August	Queen	Nicki Minaj	4	20 August	2	2
27 August	Sweetener	Ariana Grande	1	27 August	8	8
27 August	Romance of the Jukebox	Human Nature	2	27 August	2	2
27 August	Working Class Boy	Jimmy Barnes	3	27 August	1	1
3 September	Misery	The Amity Affliction	1	3 September	1	1
3 September	Love Yourself: Answer	BTS	9	3 September	1	1
10 September	Kamikaze	Eminem	1	10 September	10	10
10 September	Flow State	Tash Sultana	2	10 September	1	1
10 September	Bloom	Troye Sivan	3	10 September	1	1
10 September	Runaway	Passenger	7	10 September	1	1
10 September	8 Letters	Why Don't We	10	10 September	1	1
17 September	My Own Mess	Skegss	2	17 September	1	1
17 September	Egypt Station	Paul McCartney	4	17 September	1	1
17 September	Swimming	Mac Miller	7	17 September	1	1
17 September	I Want to Die in New Orleans	$uicideboy$	10	17 September	1	1
24 September	Cry Pretty	Carrie Underwood	4	24 September	1	1
24 September	East Atlanta Love Letter	6LACK	6	24 September	1	1
24 September	7	David Guetta	9	24 September	1	1
1 October	Living the Dream	Slash featuring Myles Kennedy and The Conspirators	4	1 October	1	1
1 October	Iridescence	Brockhampton	6	1 October	1	1
1 October	I Love Songs	Thundamentals	9	1 October	1	1
1 October	Dead Letter Circus	Dead Letter Circus	10	1 October	1	1
8 October	Home	John Butler Trio	1	8 October	1	1
8 October	Dancing Queen	Cher	2	8 October	2	2
8 October	Wunderbar	The Living End	3	8 October	1	1
8 October	The Best of Cold Chisel	Cold Chisel	2	24 October 2011	2	12
8 October	Tha Carter V	Lil Wayne	6	8 October	1	1
8 October	YSIV	Logic	8	8 October	1	1
15 October	Trench	Twenty One Pilots	1	15 October	2	2
15 October	A Star Is Born	Lady Gaga and Bradley Cooper	1	29 October	10*	10*
22 October	Nature	Paul Kelly	1	22 October	1	1
22 October	Anon	Hands Like Houses	4	22 October	1	1
22 October	Things That We Drink To	Morgan Evans	5	22 October	1	1
22 October	Internationalist	Powderfinger	1	14 September 1998	1	18
29 October	Solace	Rüfüs Du Sol	2	29 October	2	2
29 October	Evolution	Disturbed	3	29 October	1	1
29 October	Bohemian Rhapsody	Queen	2	5 November	8*	8*
29 October	Triple J Like a Version 14	Various artists	6	29 October	1	1
29 October	Greatest Hits	Troy Cassar-Daley	7	29 October	1	1
29 October	Suncity	Khalid	9	29 October	1	1
29 October	Anthem of the Peaceful Army	Greta Van Fleet	10	29 October	1	1
5 November	MTV Unplugged (Live in Melbourne)	Gang of Youths	5	5 November	1	1
5 November	Sì	Andrea Bocelli	7	5 November	2	2
12 November	Greatest Hits	Queen	3	12 November	6*	9*
12 November	Rainbow Valley	Matt Corby	4	12 November	1	1
12 November	The Platinum Collection	Queen	5	12 November	6*	6*
12 November	Walls	Barbra Streisand	7	12 November	1	1
12 November	Eyes Like the Sky	King Gizzard & the Lizard Wizard	10	12 November	1	1
19 November	Origins	Imagine Dragons	4	19 November	1	1
19 November	Armistice Day	Midnight Oil	5	19 November	1	1
19 November	Simulation Theory	Muse	7	19 November	1	1
19 November	Holy Hell	Architects	8	19 November	1	1
19 November	Laps Around the Sun	Ziggy Alberts	9	19 November	1	1
19 November	The Beatles	The Beatles	10	19 November	1	1
26 November	Love	Michael Bublé	2	26 November	4*	4*
26 November	The Greatest Showman: Reimagined	Various Artists	4	26 November	4*	4*
26 November	Delta	Mumford & Sons	5	26 November	2	2
26 November	LM5	Little Mix	8	26 November	1	1
3 December	The Special Ones	Missy Higgins	7	3 December	1	1
10 December	A Brief Inquiry into Online Relationships	The 1975	4	10 December	1	1
17 December	Skins	XXXTentacion	8	17 December	1*	1*

== See also ==
- ARIA Charts
- List of number-one albums of 2018 (Australia)
- List of top 10 albums in 2017 (Australia)
- List of top 10 singles in 2018 (Australia)
