= List of top 25 singles for 2018 in Australia =

Top selling singles in Australia in 2018

Top 25 singles of 2018 < 2017 2019 >

Other Australian top charts for 2018
- top 25 albums
- Triple J Hottest 100

Australian number-one charts of 2018
- albums
- singles
- urban singles
- dance singles
- club tracks
- digital tracks
- streaming tracks

The following lists the top 25 singles of 2018 in Australia from the Australian Recording Industry Association (ARIA) end-of-year singles chart.

"Youngblood" was the top selling single of 2018 in Australia, spending eight consecutive weeks at No. 1 through the year and becoming the first local song to top the End of Year Singles chart since Anthony Callea's "The Prayer" in 2005.

#	Title	Artist	Highest pos. reached
1	"Youngblood"	5 Seconds of Summer	1
2	"God's Plan"	Drake	1
3	"Perfect"	Ed Sheeran	1
4	"Be Alright"	Dean Lewis	1
5	"Meant to Be"	Bebe Rexha featuring Florida Georgia Line	2
6	"I Fall Apart"	Post Malone	2
7	"Psycho"	Post Malone featuring Ty Dolla $ign	1
8	"Girls Like You"	Maroon 5 featuring Cardi B	2
9	"Shotgun"	George Ezra	1
10	"Eastside"	Benny Blanco, Halsey and Khalid	2
11	"Better Now"	Post Malone	2
12	"Rockstar"	Post Malone featuring 21 Savage	1
13	"Love Lies"	Khalid and Normani	3
14	"These Days"	Rudimental featuring Jess Glynne, Macklemore and Dan Caplen	2
15	"The Middle"	Zedd, Maren Morris and Grey	7
16	"In My Feelings"	Drake	1
17	"All the Stars"	Kendrick Lamar and SZA	2
18	"IDGAF"	Dua Lipa	3
19	"River"	Eminem featuring Ed Sheeran	2
20	"One Kiss"	Calvin Harris and Dua Lipa	3
21	"Sad!"	XXXTentacion	4
22	"Nice for What"	Drake	1
23	"Havana"	Camila Cabello featuring Young Thug	1
24	"This Is Me"	Keala Settle	10
25	"Shape of You"	Ed Sheeran	1

== See also ==
- List of number-one singles of 2018 (Australia)
- List of top 10 singles in 2018 (Australia)
- List of Top 25 albums for 2018 in Australia
- 2018 in music
- ARIA Charts
- List of Australian chart achievements and milestones
