= List of top 10 singles for 2018 in Australia =

This is a list of singles that charted in the top ten of the ARIA Charts in 2018. In 2018, twenty-six acts reached the top ten for the first time.

== Top-ten singles ==
Key

| Symbol | Meaning |
|---|---|
| ◁ | Indicates single's top 10 entry was also its ARIA top 50 debut |
| (#) | 2018 Year-end top 10 single position and rank |

List of ARIA top ten singles that peaked in 2018
| Top ten entry date | Single | Artist(s) | Peak | Peak date | Weeks in top ten | References |
Singles from 2017
| 6 November | "I Fall Apart" (#6) | Post Malone | 2 | 15 January | 19 | |
| 11 December | "Meant to Be" (#5) | Bebe Rexha featuring Florida Georgia Line | 2 | 29 January | 16 | |
Singles from 2018
| 15 January | "Him & I" | G-Eazy and Halsey | 10 | 15 January | 1 | |
| 22 January | "Finesse" ^{[C]} | Bruno Mars featuring Cardi B | 6 | 5 February | 5 | |
| 22 January | "This Is Me" | Keala Settle | 10 | 22 January | 2 | |
| 29 January | "God's Plan" (#2) ◁ ^{[I]} | Drake | 1 | 5 February | 16 | |
| 5 February | "Never Be the Same" | Camila Cabello | 7 | 5 February | 3 | |
| 5 February | "Go Bang" | Pnau | 9 | 5 February | 1 | |
| 5 February | "These Days" | Rudimental featuring Jess Glynne, Macklemore and Dan Caplen | 2 | 19 February | 12 | |
| 19 February | "All the Stars" | Kendrick Lamar and SZA | 2 | 26 February | 9 | |
| 19 February | "IDGAF" | Dua Lipa | 3 | 2 April | 9 | |
| 26 February | "Pray for Me" | The Weeknd and Kendrick Lamar | 9 | 5 March | 2 | |
| 5 March | "Psycho" (#7) ◁ | Post Malone featuring Ty Dolla Sign | 1 | 7 May | 13 | |
| 12 March | "The Middle" | Zedd, Maren Morris and Grey | 7 | 19 March | 8 | |
| 12 March | "Friends" | Marshmello and Anne-Marie | 4 | 2 April | 8 | |
| 26 March | "Sad!" ^{[H]} | XXXTentacion | 4 | 2 July | 4 | |
| 2 April | "Freaky Friday" | Lil Dicky featuring Chris Brown | 4 | 9 April | 7 | |
| 2 April | "In My Blood" ◁ ^{[F]} | Shawn Mendes | 9 | 2 April | 2 | |
| 2 April | "Love Lies" | Khalid and Normani | 3 | 16 April | 13 | |
| 9 April | "Call Out My Name" ◁ | The Weeknd | 3 | 9 April | 7 | |
| 16 April | "Nice for What" ◁ ^{[I]} | Drake | 1 | 23 April | 10 | |
| 23 April | "One Kiss" | Calvin Harris and Dua Lipa | 3 | 4 June | 11 | |
| 30 April | "No Tears Left to Cry" ◁ | Ariana Grande | 1 | 30 April | 9 | |
| 7 May | "Better Now" ◁ | Post Malone | 2 | 14 May | 14 | |
| 7 May | "Paranoid" ◁ | Post Malone | 10 | 7 May | 1 | |
| 14 May | "This Is America" ◁ | Childish Gambino | 1 | 21 May | 5 | |
| 14 May | "Youngblood" (#1) | 5 Seconds of Summer | 1 | 28 May | 20 | |
| 21 May | "I Said Hi" ^{[J]} | Amy Shark | 6 | 11 June | 7 | |
| 28 May | "2002" ^{[G]} | Anne-Marie | 4 | 25 June | 8 | |
| 4 June | "Back to You" | Selena Gomez | 4 | 18 June | 5 | |
| 11 June | "Girls Like You" (#8) ◁ | Maroon 5 featuring Cardi B | 2 | 25 June | 17 | |
| 18 June | "All Mine" | Kanye West | 10 | 18 June | 1 | |
| 2 July | "Lovely" | Billie Eilish featuring Khalid | 5 | 2 July | 1 | |
| 2 July | "Solo" | Clean Bandit featuring Demi Lovato | 7 | 2 July | 4 | |
| 2 July | "Jocelyn Flores" ◁ | XXXTentacion | 8 | 2 July | 1 | |
| 9 July | "Don't Matter to Me" ◁ | Drake featuring Michael Jackson | 3 | 9 July | 3 | |
| 9 July | "Nonstop" ◁ | Drake | 5 | 9 July | 1 | |
| 16 July | "In My Feelings" | Drake | 1 | 23 July | 10 | |
| 16 July | "Be Alright" (#4) | Dean Lewis | 1 | 20 August | 21 | |
| 16 July | "Lucid Dreams" ^{[K]} | Juice WRLD | 8 | 16 July | 2 | |
| 16 July | "Nevermind" ^{[K]} | Dennis Lloyd | 10 | 16 July | 2 | |
| 23 July | "God Is a Woman" ◁ ^{[L]} | Ariana Grande | 5 | 23 July | 5 | |
| 30 July | "Healing Hands" | Conrad Sewell | 7 | 30 July | 4 | |
| 6 August | "Eastside" (#10) | Benny Blanco featuring Halsey and Khalid | 2 | 27 August | 24 | |
| 6 August | "No Brainer" ◁ | DJ Khaled featuring Justin Bieber, Chance the Rapper and Quavo | 6 | 6 August | 6 | |
| 6 August | "FEFE" ◁ | 6ix9ine featuring Nicki Minaj and Murda Beatz | 8 | 6 August | 1 | |
| 13 August | "Rise" ^{[M]}^{[N]} | Jonas Blue featuring Jack & Jack | 7 | 24 September | 8 | |
| 13 August | "Stargazing" ◁ | Travis Scott | 10 | 13 August | 1 | |
| 20 August | "High Hopes" | Panic! at the Disco | 7 | 20 August | 8 | |
| 27 August | "Breathin" ◁ | Ariana Grande | 8 | 27 August | 1 | |
| 27 August | "Shotgun" (#9) | George Ezra | 1 | 24 September | 23 | |
| 10 September | "Lucky You" ◁ | Eminem featuring Joyner Lucas | 4 | 10 September | 1 | |
| 10 September | "The Ringer" ◁ | Eminem | 5 | 10 September | 1 | |
| 17 September | "Promises" | Calvin Harris and Sam Smith | 4 | 17 September | 9 | |
| 17 September | "I Love It" ◁ | Kanye West and Lil Pump | 4 | 24 September | 6 | |
| 24 September | "Happier" | Marshmello and Bastille | 3 | 22 October | 15 | |
| 1 October | "Falling Down" ◁ | Lil Peep and XXXTentacion | 7 | 1 October | 1 | |
| 8 October | "Better" | Khalid | 6 | 29 October | 5 | |
| 8 October | "Body" | Loud Luxury featuring Brando | 7 | 22 October | 9 | |
| 15 October | "In My Mind" | Dynoro and Gigi D'Agostino | 7 | 15 October | 2 | |
| 22 October | "Without Me" | Halsey | 2 | 10 December | 20 | |
| 29 October | "Shallow" | Lady Gaga and Bradley Cooper | 1 | 29 October | 22 | |
| 12 November | "Thank U, Next" ◁ | Ariana Grande | 1 | 19 November | 13 | |
| 3 December | "Let You Love Me" | Rita Ora | 8 | 3 December | 2 | |
| 17 December | "Nothing Breaks Like a Heart" | Mark Ronson featuring Miley Cyrus | 6 | 24 December | 8 | |
| 31 December | "Do They Know It's Christmas? (2014)" | Ed Sheeran, Clean Bandit, Sam Smith, One Direction, Coldplay, Bastille, Rita Ora, and more (Note: Other artists include Ellie Goulding, Bono, Alfie Deyes, Paloma Faith, Guy Garvey, Angélique Kidjo, Sinéad O'Connor, Olly Murs, Emeli Sandé, Seal, Joe Sugg, Zoe Sugg, Karl Hyde and Jessie Ware.) | 8 | 31 December | 1 | |

=== 2017 peaks ===
List of ARIA top ten singles in 2018 that peaked in 2017
| Top ten entry date | Single | Artist(s) | Peak | Peak date | Weeks in top ten | References |
|---|---|---|---|---|---|---|
| 13 March | "Perfect" (#3) ◁ | Ed Sheeran | 1 | 11 December | 25 | |
| 25 September | "Rockstar" ◁ | Post Malone featuring 21 Savage | 1 | 2 October | 19 | |
| 9 October | "Havana" | Camila Cabello featuring Young Thug | 1 | 20 November | 17 | |
| 16 October | "Feel It Still" ^{[B]} | Portugal. The Man | 5 | 30 October | 8 | |
| 13 November | "Silence" ^{[D]} | Marshmello featuring Khalid | 5 | 11 December | 13 | |
| 20 November | "Wolves" | Selena Gomez and Marshmello | 5 | 27 November | 9 | |
| 11 December | "Let You Down" | NF | 7 | 11 December | 10 | |
| 25 December | "River" ◁ ^{[E]} | Eminem featuring Ed Sheeran | 2 | 25 December | 12 | |

=== 2019 peaks ===
List of ARIA top ten singles in 2018 that peaked in 2019
| Top ten entry date | Single | Artist(s) | Peak | Peak date | Weeks in top ten | References |
|---|---|---|---|---|---|---|
| 13 August | "Sicko Mode" ◁ ^{[P]} | Travis Scott featuring Drake | 6 | 4 February | 10 | |
| 29 October | "When the Party's Over" ◁ ^{[D]} | Billie Eilish | 7 | 8 April | 4 | |
| 5 November | "Sunflower" | Post Malone and Swae Lee | 1 | 7 January | 31 | |
| 10 December | "Sweet but Psycho" | Ava Max | 2 | 7 January | 16 | |

=== Holiday season ===
Holiday titles first making the ARIA Top 50 top ten during the 2017–18 holiday season
| Top ten entry date | Single | Artist(s) | Peak | Peak date | Weeks in top ten | Ref. |
|---|---|---|---|---|---|---|
| 1 January 2018 | "All I Want for Christmas Is You" ^{[A]}^{[Q]} | Mariah Carey | 1 | 31 December 2018 | 21 | |

Holiday titles first making the ARIA Top 50 top ten during the 2018–19 holiday season
| Top ten entry date | Single | Artist(s) | Peak | Peak date | Weeks in top ten | Ref. |
|---|---|---|---|---|---|---|
| 31 December 2018 | "Last Christmas" | Wham! | 2 | 28 December 2020 | 13 | |

Notes:

^{A} The single re-entered the top 10 on 1 January 2018.
^{B} The single re-entered the top 10 on 8 January 2018.
^{C} The single re-entered the top 10 on 5 February 2018.
^{D} The single re-entered the top 10 on 12 February 2018.
^{E} The single re-entered the top 10 on 19 March 2018.
^{F} The single re-entered the top 10 on 4 June 2018.
^{G} The single re-entered the top 10 on 18 June 2018.
^{H} The single re-entered the top 10 on 25 June 2018.
^{I} The singles re-entered the top 10 on 9 July 2018.
^{J} The single re-entered the top 10 on 23 July 2018.
^{K} The singles re-entered the top 10 on 30 July 2018.
^{L} The single re-entered the top 10 on 27 August 2018.
^{M} The single re-entered the top 10 on 3 September 2018.
^{N} The single re-entered the top 10 on 17 September 2018.
^{O} The single re-entered the top 10 on 19 November 2018.
^{P} The single re-entered the top 10 on 10 December 2018.
^{Q} The single re-entered the top 10 on 24 December 2018.

== Entries by artist ==
The following table shows artists who achieved two or more top 10 entries in 2018, including songs that reached their peak in 2017 and 2019. The figures include both main artists and featured artists. The total number of weeks an artist spent in the top ten in 2018 is also shown.

| Entries | Artist | Weeks | Songs |
|---|---|---|---|
| 6 | Drake | 34 | "Don't Matter to Me", "God's Plan", "In My Feelings", "Nice for What", "Nonstop", "Sicko Mode" |
| 6 | Post Malone | 41 | "Better Now", "I Fall Apart", "Paranoid", "Psycho", "Rockstar", "Sunflower" |
| 5 | Khalid | 40 | "Better", "Eastside", "Love Lies", "Lovely", "Silence" |
| 4 | Ariana Grande | 22 | "Breathin", "God Is a Woman", "No Tears Left to Cry", "Thank U, Next" |
| 4 | Marshmello | 29 | "Friends", "Happier", "Silence", "Wolves" |
| 3 | Ed Sheeran | 14 | "Do They Know It's Christmas? (2014)", "Perfect", "River" |
| 3 | Eminem | 12 | "Lucky You", "River", "The Ringer" |
| 3 | Halsey | 23 | "Eastside", "Him & I", "Without Me" |
| 3 | XXXTentacion | 5 | "Falling Down", "Jocelyn Flores", "Sad!" |
| 2 | Anne-Marie | 16 | "2002", "Friends" |
| 2 | Bastille | 15 | "Do They Know It's Christmas? (2014)", "Happier" |
| 2 | Billie Eilish | 4 | "Lovely", "When the Party's Over" |
| 2 | Calvin Harris | 20 | "One Kiss", "Promises" |
| 2 | Camila Cabello | 8 | "Havana", "Never Be the Same" |
| 2 | Cardi B | 22 | "Finesse", "Girls Like You" |
| 2 | Clean Bandit | 5 | "Do They Know It's Christmas? (2014)", "Solo" |
| 2 | Dua Lipa | 20 | "IDGAF", "One Kiss" |
| 2 | Kanye West | 7 | "All Mine", "I Love It" |
| 2 | Kendrick Lamar | 8 | "All the Stars", "Pray for Me" |
| 2 | Rita Ora | 3 | "Do They Know It's Christmas? (2014)", "Let You Love Me" |
| 2 | Selena Gomez | 8 | "Back to You", "Wolves" |
| 2 | The Weeknd | 9 | "Call Out My Name", "Pray for Me" |
| 2 | Travis Scott | 5 | "Sicko Mode", "Stargazing" |

== See also ==
- 2018 in music
- ARIA Charts
- List of number-one singles of 2018 (Australia)
- List of top 10 albums in 2018 (Australia)
