= List of top 25 albums for 2018 in Australia =

Top 25 albums of 2018 < 2017 2019 >

Other Australian top charts for 2018
- top 25 singles
- Triple J Hottest 100

Australian number-one charts of 2018
- albums
- singles
- urban singles
- dance singles
- club tracks
- digital tracks
- streaming tracks

The following is a list of the top 25 albums of 2018 in Australia from the Australian Recording Industry Association (ARIA) end-of-year albums chart.

The Greatest Showman soundtrack was the most popular album in Australia in 2018. The album spent 49 weeks inside the top 10 and it is the first soundtrack to top the End of Year Charts since Moulin Rouge! in 2001. Ed Sheeran's ÷ was number 1 in 2017. Amy Shark's Love Monster was the highest selling album by an Australian artist in 2018.

== Top 25 ==
#	Title	Artist	Highest pos. reached
1	The Greatest Showman	Various artists	1
2	÷	Ed Sheeran	1
3	A Star Is Born	Lady Gaga and Bradley Cooper	1
4	Beerbongs & Bentleys	Post Malone	1
5	Bohemian Rhapsody	Queen	2 (Note: Bohemian Rhapsody peaked at number 2 in 2018. The album peaked at number 1 in January 2019)
6	Kamikaze	Eminem	1
7	Scorpion	Drake	1
8	Greatest Hits	Queen	2
9	Beautiful Trauma	P!nk	1
10	x	Ed Sheeran	1
11	Reputation	Taylor Swift	1
12	?	XXXTentacion	2
13	Stoney	Post Malone	5
14	Love Monster	Amy Shark	1
15	The Platinum Collection	Queen	5
16	Sweetener	Ariana Grande	1
17	Shawn Mendes	Shawn Mendes	1
18	Nation of Two	Vance Joy	1
19	Graffiti U	Keith Urban	1
20	Black Panther: The Album	Various artists	2
21	Evolve	Imagine Dragons	4
22	Mamma Mia! Here We Go Again	Various artists	1
23	+	Ed Sheeran	3
24	Guardians of the Galaxy: Awesome Mix Vol. 1	Various artists	2
25	Curtain Call: The Hits	Eminem	1

== See also ==
- List of number-one albums of 2018 (Australia)
- List of top 10 albums in 2018 (Australia)
- List of Top 25 singles for 2018 in Australia
- 2018 in music
- ARIA Charts
- List of Australian chart achievements and milestones
