= List of number-one streaming tracks of 2018 (Australia) =

ARIA Charts number-one streaming tracks of 2018 < 2017 2019 >

Other Australian number-one charts of 2018
- albums
- singles
- urban singles
- dance singles
- club tracks
- digital tracks

Top Australian singles and albums of 2018
- Triple J Hottest 100
- top 25 singles
- top 25 albums

The ARIA Streaming Chart ranks the best-performing streaming tracks of Australia. It is published by Australian Recording Industry Association (ARIA), an organisation who collects music data for the weekly ARIA Charts.

== Chart history ==
Key
†	Indicates number-one streaming single of 2018

Issue date	Song	Artist(s)	Reference
1 January	"Perfect"	Ed Sheeran	
8 January	"Perfect"	Ed Sheeran	
15 January	"Perfect"	Ed Sheeran	
22 January	"I Fall Apart"	Post Malone	
29 January	"Perfect"	Ed Sheeran	
5 February	"God's Plan"†	Drake	
12 February	"God's Plan"†	Drake	
19 February	"God's Plan"†	Drake	
26 February	"God's Plan"†	Drake	
5 March	"God's Plan"†	Drake	
12 March	"God's Plan"†	Drake	
19 March	"God's Plan"†	Drake	
26 March	"God's Plan"†	Drake	
2 April	"God's Plan"†	Drake	
9 April	"God's Plan"†	Drake	
16 April	"God's Plan"†	Drake	
23 April	"Nice for What"	Drake	
30 April	"Nice for What"	Drake	
7 May	"Psycho"	Post Malone featuring Ty Dolla Sign	
14 May	"Better Now"	Post Malone	
21 May	"This Is America"	Childish Gambino	
28 May	"Better Now"	Post Malone	
4 June	"Youngblood"	5 Seconds of Summer	
11 June	"Youngblood"	5 Seconds of Summer	
18 June	"Youngblood"	5 Seconds of Summer	
25 June	"Youngblood"	5 Seconds of Summer	
2 July	"Youngblood"	5 Seconds of Summer	
9 July	"Youngblood"	5 Seconds of Summer	
16 July	"Youngblood"	5 Seconds of Summer	
23 July	"In My Feelings"	Drake	
30 July	"In My Feelings"	Drake	
6 August	"In My Feelings"	Drake	
13 August	"In My Feelings"	Drake	
20 August	"In My Feelings"	Drake	
27 August	"Be Alright"	Dean Lewis	
3 September	"Eastside"	Benny Blanco featuring Halsey and Khalid	
10 September	"Eastside"	Benny Blanco featuring Halsey and Khalid	
17 September	"Eastside"	Benny Blanco featuring Halsey and Khalid	
24 September	"Eastside"	Benny Blanco featuring Halsey and Khalid	
1 October	"Eastside"	Benny Blanco featuring Halsey and Khalid	
8 October	"Eastside"	Benny Blanco featuring Halsey and Khalid	
15 October	"Eastside"	Benny Blanco featuring Halsey and Khalid	
22 October	"Eastside"	Benny Blanco featuring Halsey and Khalid	
29 October	"Eastside"	Benny Blanco featuring Halsey and Khalid	
5 November	"Shallow"	Lady Gaga and Bradley Cooper	
12 November	"Thank U, Next"	Ariana Grande	
19 November	"Thank U, Next"	Ariana Grande	
26 November	"Thank U, Next"	Ariana Grande	
3 December	"Thank U, Next"	Ariana Grande	
10 December	"Thank U, Next"	Ariana Grande	
17 December	"Thank U, Next"	Ariana Grande	
24 December	"Thank U, Next"	Ariana Grande	
31 December	"All I Want for Christmas Is You"	Mariah Carey	

== Number-one artists ==
Position	Artist	Weeks at No. 1
1	Drake	18
2	Benny Blanco	9
2	Halsey (as featuring)	9
2	Khalid (as featuring)	9
3	5 Seconds of Summer	7
3	Ariana Grande	7
4	Ed Sheeran	4
4	Post Malone	4
5	Dean Lewis	1
5	Childish Gambino	1
5	Lady Gaga	1
5	Bradley Cooper	1
5	Mariah Carey	1
5	Ty Dolla Sign (as featuring)	1

== See also ==
- 2018 in music
- ARIA Charts
- List of number-one singles of 2018 (Australia)
