= This Is America =

2018 single by Childish Gambino

Single by Childish Gambino
- Released: May 6, 2018
- Genre: Hip hop; Afrobeats; trap; progressive rap
- Length: 3:45
- Label: mcDJ; RCA
- Songwriters: Donald Glover; Ludwig Göransson; Jeffery Williams
- Producers: Donald Glover; Ludwig Göransson

Childish Gambino singles chronology
"Terrified" (2017)	"This Is America" (2018)	"Summertime Magic" (2018)

Music video
- "This Is America" on YouTube

"This Is America" is a song by American rapper Childish Gambino. Written by Gambino, Ludwig Göransson and American rapper Young Thug (who provides additional vocals) and produced by the former two, it was released on May 6, 2018, at the same time that Gambino was hosting an episode of Saturday Night Live. The song also features backing vocals from fellow American rappers Slim Jxmmi of Rae Sremmurd, BlocBoy JB, Quavo of Migos, and 21 Savage. The lyrics and accompanying music video, reflecting the core of the Black Lives Matter movement, confront issues of ongoing systemic racism, including prejudice, racial violence, the ghetto, and law enforcement in the United States, as well as the wider issues of mass shootings and gun violence in the United States.

The song's accompanying music video was directed by filmmaker Hiro Murai, a frequent Gambino collaborator. "This Is America" became the 31st song to debut at number one on the US Billboard Hot 100, becoming both Gambino's first number one and top ten single in the country. It has also topped the charts in Australia, Canada, and New Zealand. The song won in all four of its nominated categories at the 61st Annual Grammy Awards: Record of the Year, Song of the Year, Best Rap/Sung Performance and Best Music Video. This made Gambino the first hip-hop artist to win Record of the Year and Song of the Year, and "This Is America" the first rap song to win these awards.

== Composition ==
The song features a gospel-style choir and ad-libs from Young Thug, Slim Jxmmi of Rae Sremmurd, BlocBoy JB, 21 Savage, and Quavo. Young Thug returns to supply the song's outro, garnering him writing credits. The lyrics primarily address black culture in the United States and gun violence in the country. It also touches on the subject of police brutality and misconduct. Pitchfork's Stephen Kearse described the song as a representation of the "tightrope of being black", with the song "built on the sharp contrast between jolly, syncretic melodies and menacing trap cadences".

Glover has stated that the idea for the song "started as a joke," elaborating in a video interview with GQ: "To be completely honest, 'This is America' — that was all we had was that line. It started as a Drake diss, to be honest, as like a funny way of doing it. But then I was like, this s–t sounds kind of hard though. So I was like, let me play with it." (As Childish Gambino, Glover had a mostly one-sided feud with Drake that began in 2014; he has since clarified his 'bravado' was just part of the gig and no hate was intended.)

A number of listeners accused Gambino of plagiarism over "This Is America", pointing out the similarities between the song and "American Pharaoh" by Jase Harley. CBS News stated, "The tracks have a similar sound, and share similar themes in the lyrics." Harley stated that he felt "This Is America" was influenced by his song. At the time, he did not have an issue with this. However, when Gambino did not acknowledge him at the Grammys, Harley was upset and called Gambino a "house slave". Glover's manager, Fam Rothstein, denied any plagiarism.

== Music video analysis ==
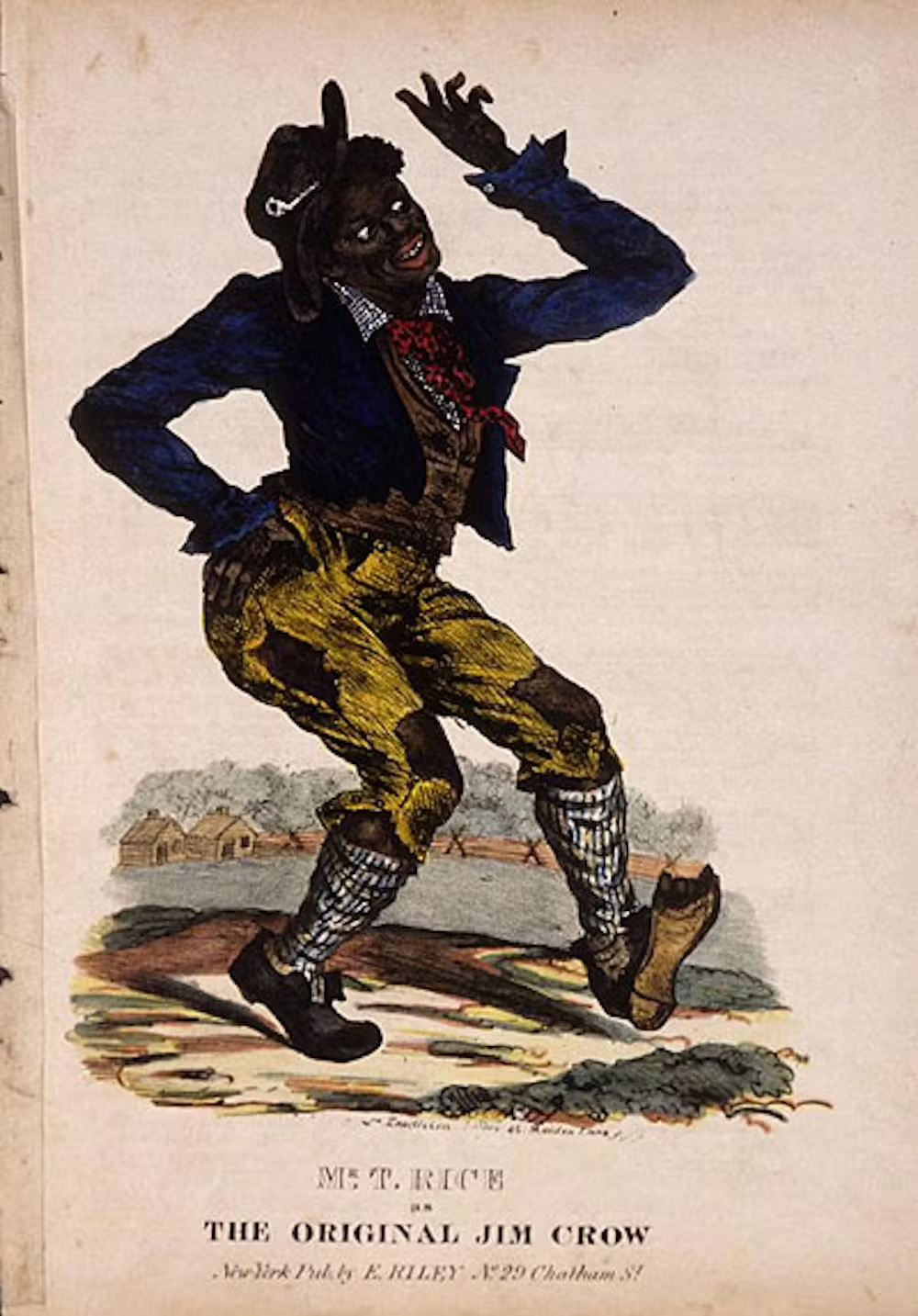
In the music video, Gambino assumes a stance similar to the Jim Crow caricature.

The music video was directed by Hiro Murai and released on YouTube simultaneously with Gambino's performance of the song on Saturday Night Live. The video received about 12.9 million views in 24 hours, and has accumulated over 999 million views as of November 2026, closing in on the 1 billion milestone before finally breaking it on November 12, 2026. In an interview with The New York Times, Murai discussed his upcoming season for Atlanta, a show created by and starring Glover. He stated: "There's sort of a world-weariness in both this season and the music video. They're both reactions to what's happening in the world."

The video contains many scenes involving violence. It starts off with a shirtless Gambino dancing through a warehouse, interacting with a series of chaotic scenes. According to Murai, the video was inspired by the films Mother! and City of God. Prettyman states "The video tests us, taunting us to keep pace as we try to decode every gesture and calculation". Choreographed by Sherrie Silver, Gambino and his entourage of young dancers perform several viral dance moves including the South African Gwara gwara and "Shoot" popularized by BlocBoy JB, who is one of the ad-lib contributors on the song. Gambino's dancing is contrasted against moments of violence. Only 53 seconds into the video, Gambino shoots a man in the back of the head with a handgun, while assuming a comical stance similar to a Jim Crow caricature. The first person depicted as being shot in the video, a guitarist who had been accompanying Gambino's singing up to that point, was musician Calvin the Second. This first shooting also marks a transition in the music, from an African "folk-inspired melody" to "dark, pulsing trap". At a later point, Childish Gambino uses a Kalashnikov patterned automatic weapon to gun down a church choir.

Childish Gambino shooting a church choir in the music video, which is largely inspired by the 2015 Charleston church shooting, was controversial in the media.

In both scenes a child appears from off-screen holding a red cloth, on which Gambino gently lays the weapon used, while the bodies are simply dragged away. A group of children in school uniforms joins Gambino in dancing, only to panic and scatter when the music imitates the sound of gunfire and Gambino positions his arms as if firing a gun, after which he lights a joint. Other schoolchildren are seen on a catwalk above, using their cell phones to record the chaos happening in the video as Gambino sings the lyrics "This a celly / That's a tool". Martha Tesema, writer for website Mashable, stated that "cell phones have been used as tools to broadcast police shooting, rioting against, or choking black people in this country". The word "celly" might also be a reference to a prison cell, making the line a reference to the disproportionate incarceration of black Americans. Throughout the video, numerous vehicles from several decades ago are featured, many of them with their hazard lights flashing and the driver's side door ajar. American singer SZA makes a cameo appearance towards the end of the video, seated atop one of these vehicles. The video ends with Gambino in a darkened portion of the warehouse, fearfully running towards the camera while being chased by several white people.

The dance moves were choreographed by Rwandan-born Sherrie Silver based on various African dances such as the Ghanaian Azonto, Nigerian Shoki, and the South African Gwara gwara, as well as gyration or walking moves from Angola and Ivory Coast.

=== Critical reception ===
The music video received widespread critical acclaim. Spencer Kornhaber of The Atlantic described the initial reaction on Twitter as "a gushing river of well-deserved praise" and the video as "the most talked-about music video of recent memory." Daniel Kreps of Rolling Stone commented that the video "is a surreal, visceral statement about gun violence in America". Pitchfork awarded the song the distinction of "Best New Track". Billboard critics ranked it 10th among the "greatest music videos of the 21st century." Mahita Gajanan of Time quoted music history professor Guthrie Ramsey at the University of Pennsylvania:

He's talking about the contradictions of trying to get money, the idea of being a black man in America. It comes out of two different sound worlds. Part of the brilliance of the presentation is that you go from this happy major mode of choral singing that we associate with South African choral singing, and then after the first gunshot it moves right into the trap sound.

Will Gompertz, arts editor of the BBC, asserted that "This Is America" was a "powerful and poignant allegorical portrait of 21st Century America, which warrants a place among the canonical depictions of the USA from Grant Wood's American Gothic to Edward Hopper's Nighthawks, from Emanuel Leutze's Washington Crossing the Delaware to America the Beautiful by Norman Lewis".

In December 2018, Billboard ranked "This Is America" as the 6th best song of the year.

The music video won the International Film Festival of the Art of Cinematography Camerimage Award for Best Cinematography in a Music Video, as well as the Grammy Award for Best Music Video at the 61st Grammy Awards.

== Media appearances ==
On May 5, 2018, Glover hosted the nineteenth episode of the 43rd season of Saturday Night Live. Childish Gambino was the musical guest in the same episode, and Glover performed two songs as his alter ego, the second of which was "This Is America". Daniel Kaluuya, best known as the star of the film Get Out (which the music video reportedly references), introduced the song's performance.

== Cover versions, adaptations, and in popular culture ==
Several artists attracted attention and millions of views for creating covers of the song and music video with altered lyrics and themes, retaining the song's instrumental and the general structure of its music videos.

Bay Area rapper Lil B featured a remix of his own on his Options mixtape titled "This Is the BasedGod" in October 2018.

The music video also spawned popular Internet memes, particularly those in which the audio was replaced so that Childish Gambino appeared to be dancing in time to another song. Versions using Carly Rae Jepsen's "Call Me Maybe", Earth, Wind & Fire's "September" and Banda Blanca's "Sopa de Caracol" were some of the most viewed.

The song is interpolated into a scene in the film Guava Island (released 2019), which was directed by Hiro and features Glover and Rihanna.

=== Other countries ===
Covers and parodies of the song were generated around the world, including:

- "This Is Nigeria" was released by Nigerian rapper Falz released on May 25, 2018, highlighting the nation's issues with corruption and organized crime in Nigeria, among other themes.
- "This Is Sierra Leone" (June 2018)
- "This Is Barbados" (June 2018)
- "This Is Malaysia" (June 2018)
- "This Is Iraq" (January 2019) parodies the US-led invasion of Iraq.
- "This is The Philippines" (August 2018) by Mikey Bustos
- "ETA WAA ES PERÚ" (June 2018) by Benjadoes
- "This Is Not America" (March 2022) by Residente ft. Ibeyi
- "This Is Australia" (January 2023), by Australian dance company Marrugeku, with vocals led by Noongar rapper Beni Bjah, features many local references, and criticises Australia's treatment of refugees, Aboriginal and Torres Strait Islander people, and migrants.
- "This is Russia" (May 2018) by Yury Khovansky

== Chart performance ==
"This Is America" debuted at number one on the US Billboard Hot 100, becoming the 31st song to do so in the chart's history. It debuted with 78,000 downloads sold and 65.3 million US streams in the first week. Its music video accounted for 68% of the song's streaming total. "This Is America" is also Gambino's first top 10; he previously reached number 12 in August 2017 with "Redbone". "This Is America" overtook Drake's "Nice for What" from the top position for two weeks. Gambino is also the second Emmy Award-winning actor to reach number one on the Hot 100, the first being Justin Timberlake, who topped the chart with "Can't Stop the Feeling!" in 2016. It topped the Hot 100 for two weeks, and left the top ten after five weeks.

== Credits and personnel ==
Credits are adapted from Tidal.

- Donald Glover – lead vocals (as Childish Gambino), production, composition
- Jeffery Lamar Williams – composition, backing vocals (as Young Thug)
- Quavo – background vocals
- 21 Savage – backing vocals
- Slim Jxmmi – backing vocals
- BlocBoy JB – backing vocals
- Ludwig Göransson – production, composition, recording engineer
- Alex Tumay – recording engineer
- Riley Mackin – recording engineer
- Kesha "K.Lee" Lee – recording engineer
- Dru Castro – recording engineer
- Dacota G. Fresilli – recording engineer
- Zak Menebhi – recording engineer
- Derek "MixedByAli" Ali – mixing engineer
- Mike Bozzi – mastering engineer

== Charts ==
=== Weekly charts ===
Chart (2018)	Peak position
Australia (ARIA)	1
Austria (Ö3 Austria Top 40)	20
Belgium (Ultratop 50 Flanders)	30
Belgium (Ultratip Bubbling Under Wallonia)	7
Canada Hot 100 (Billboard)	1
Czech Republic Singles Digital (ČNS IFPI)	8
Denmark (Tracklisten)	13
Dominican Republic (SODINPRO)	46
France (SNEP)	31
Germany (GfK)	39
Hungary (Single Top 40)	9
Hungary (Stream Top 40)	3
Ireland (IRMA)	2
Japan (Japan Hot 100)	24
Italy (FIMI)	49
Netherlands (Dutch Top 40)	21
Netherlands (Single Top 100)	19
New Zealand (Recorded Music NZ)	1
Norway (VG-lista)	10
Portugal (AFP)	2
Scottish Singles Sales (Official Charts)	11
Slovakia Singles Digital (ČNS IFPI)	3
Spain (PROMUSICAE)	46
Sweden (Sverigetopplistan)	9
Switzerland (Schweizer Hitparade)	16
UK Singles (Official Charts)	6
US Billboard Hot 100	1
US Hot R&B/Hip-Hop Songs (Billboard)	1
US Rhythmic Airplay (Billboard)	9

=== Year-end charts ===
Chart (2018)	Position
Australia (ARIA)	88
Canada (Canadian Hot 100)	35
Estonia (IFPI)	95
US Billboard Hot 100	51
US Hot R&B/Hip-Hop Songs (Billboard)	26

== Certifications ==
Region	Certification	Certified units/sales
Australia (ARIA)	3× Platinum	210,000^{‡}
Canada (Music Canada)	3× Platinum	240,000^{‡}
Denmark (IFPI Danmark)	Gold	45,000^{‡}
France (SNEP)	Gold	100,000^{‡}
Mexico (AMPROFON)	Platinum	60,000^{‡}
New Zealand (RMNZ)	2× Platinum	60,000^{‡}
Poland (ZPAV)	Platinum	20,000^{‡}
Portugal (AFP)	Gold	5,000^{‡}
United Kingdom (BPI)	Platinum	600,000^{‡}
United States (RIAA)	5× Platinum	5,000,000^{‡}
Streaming
Sweden (GLF)	Gold	4,000,000^{†}
^{‡} Sales+streaming figures based on certification alone.^{†} Streaming-only figures based on certification alone.

== Release history ==
Region	Date	Format	Label	Ref.
Various	May 5, 2018	Digital download	mcDJ; RCA	
United States	May 15, 2018	Rhythmic contemporary radio	mcDJ; RCA	

== See also ==
- List of number-one singles of 2018 (Australia)
- List of number-one urban singles of 2018 (Australia)
- List of number-one streaming tracks of 2018 (Australia)
- List of top 10 singles in 2018 (Australia)
- List of Canadian Hot 100 number-one singles of 2018
- List of number-one singles from the 2010s (New Zealand)
- List of Billboard Hot 100 number-one singles of 2018
- List of number-one R&B/hip-hop songs of 2018 (U.S.)
- Billboard Year-End Hot 100 singles of 2018
