= Sherrie Silver =

Rwandan-British choreographer

- Born: 1994 (age 31–32); Rwanda
- Occupation: Choreographer
- Notable work: This Is America (2018 music video) choreography
- Awards: MTV Video Music Award for Best Choreography (2018)
- Website: www.sherriesilver.com

Sherrie Silver is a Rwandan-born British choreographer who choreographed the music video for Childish Gambino's 2018 song This Is America. Her choreography won the MTV Video Music Award for Best Choreography the same year.

== Early life and education ==
Silver was born in 1994 to mother Florence Silver, one month after her father was killed in the Genocide against the Tutsi. Silver and her mother moved to London, England when she was aged five-years. She attended a Stagecoach Theatre Arts school and co-founded the Children of Destiny dance group when she was aged 11-years, before performing for Rwandan President Paul Kagame.

Silver studied business and marketing at university.

== Career ==
Silver choreographed the music video for Childish Gambino's song This Is America, which won the best choreography award at the 2018 MTV Video Music Awards. Silver also appeared in the music video for the song.

Silver is a United Nations' International Fund for Agricultural Development youth advocate and met Pope Francis in 2019 as part of that role.

In 2023, Silver gave a dance lesson to World Health Organization Director-General Tedros Adhanom Ghebreyesus.

In 2019, the International Fund for Agricultural Development (IFAD), "announced that Silver was appointed as an Advocate for Rural Youth."

- For us it's not about making money it's about supporting the foundation and the community, She said
  - "The silver Galar returns". The New Times. September 20, 2026.

== See also ==
- List of choreographers
