= List of Canadian Hot 100 number-one singles of 2018 =

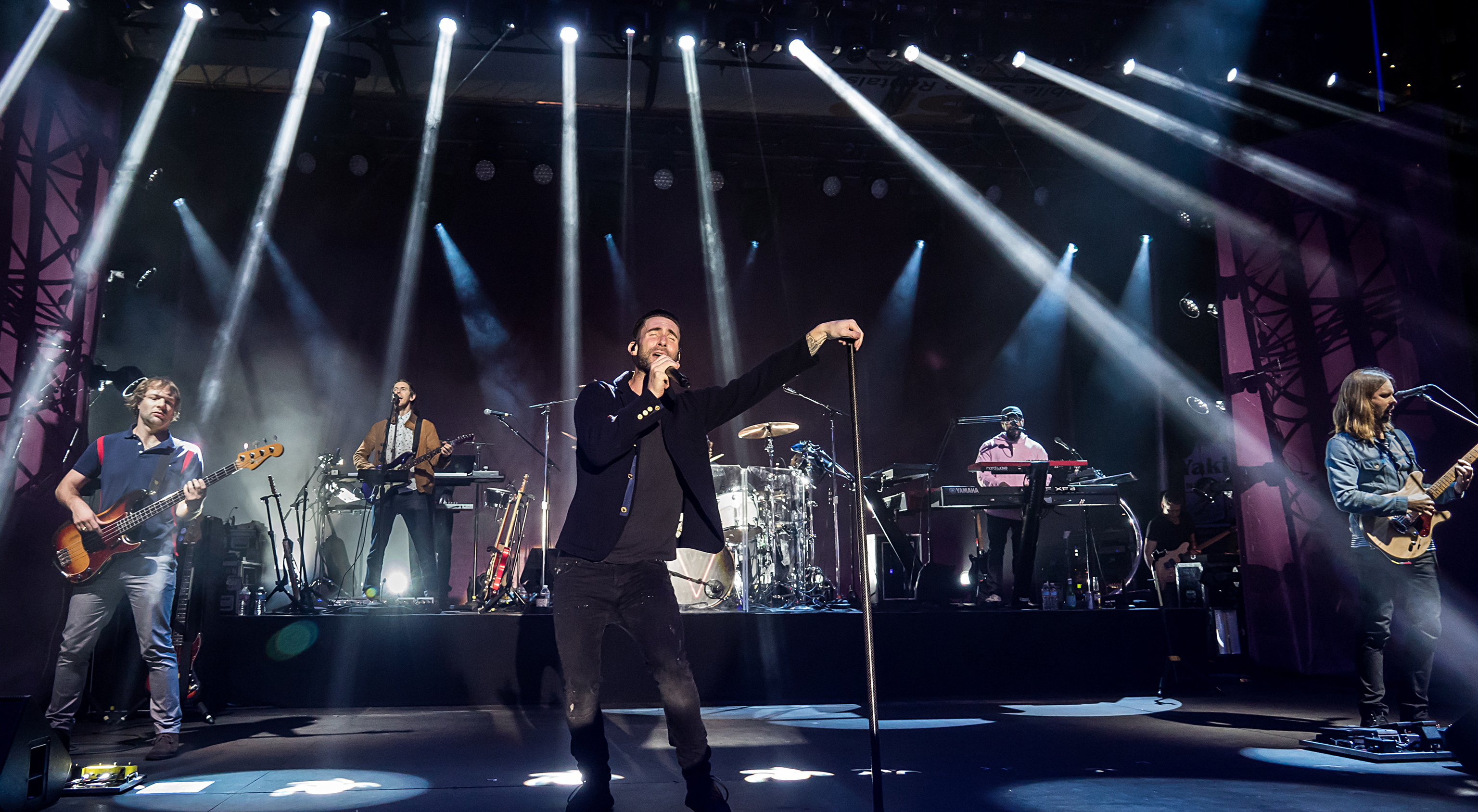
"Girls Like You" by Maroon 5 (pictured) featuring Cardi B spent ten weeks at number one, tying Drake's "God's Plan" for the joint-longest-running number-one single of the year.

This is a list of the Canadian Hot 100 number-one singles of 2018. The Canadian Hot 100 is a chart that ranks the best-performing singles of Canada. Its data, published by Billboard magazine and compiled by Nielsen SoundScan, is based collectively on each single's weekly physical and digital sales, as well as airplay and streaming.

== Chart history ==
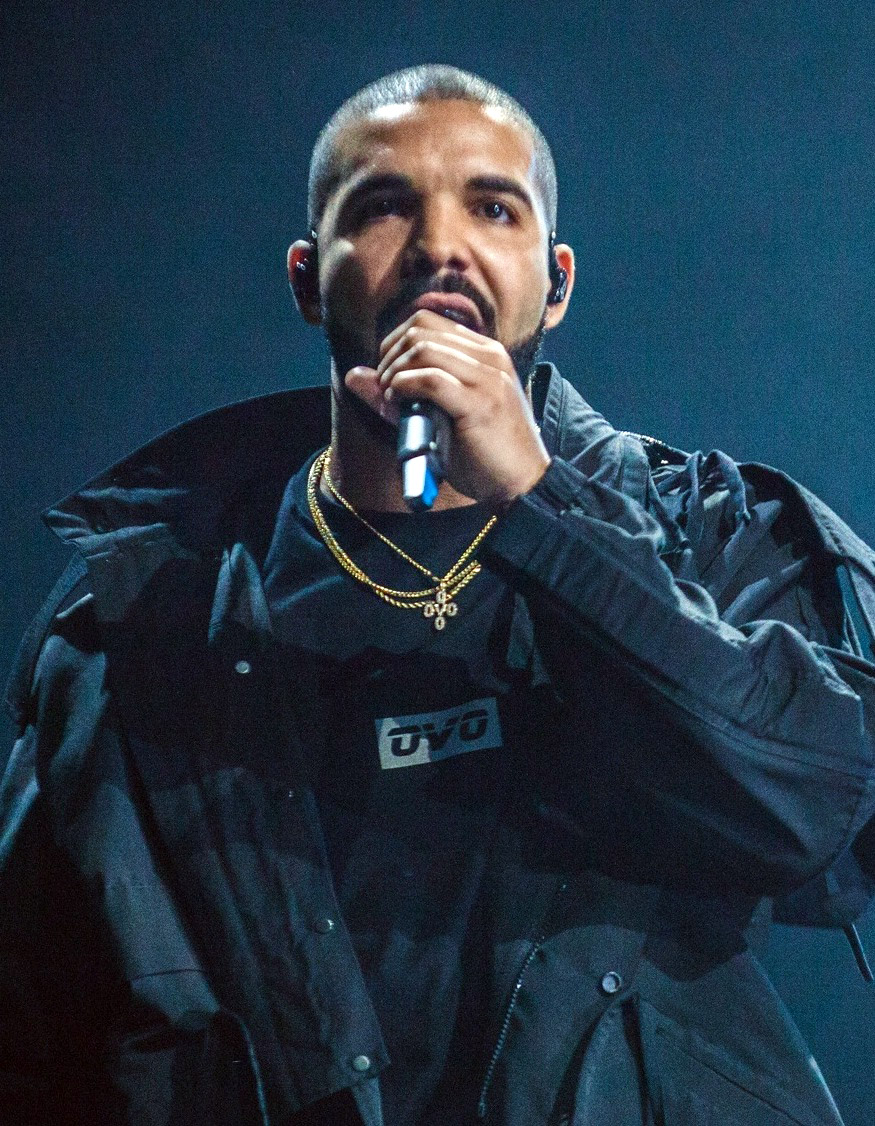
With "God's Plan", "Nice for What", "Nonstop" and "In My Feelings", Drake (pictured) became the second act to score four number-one singles from one album.

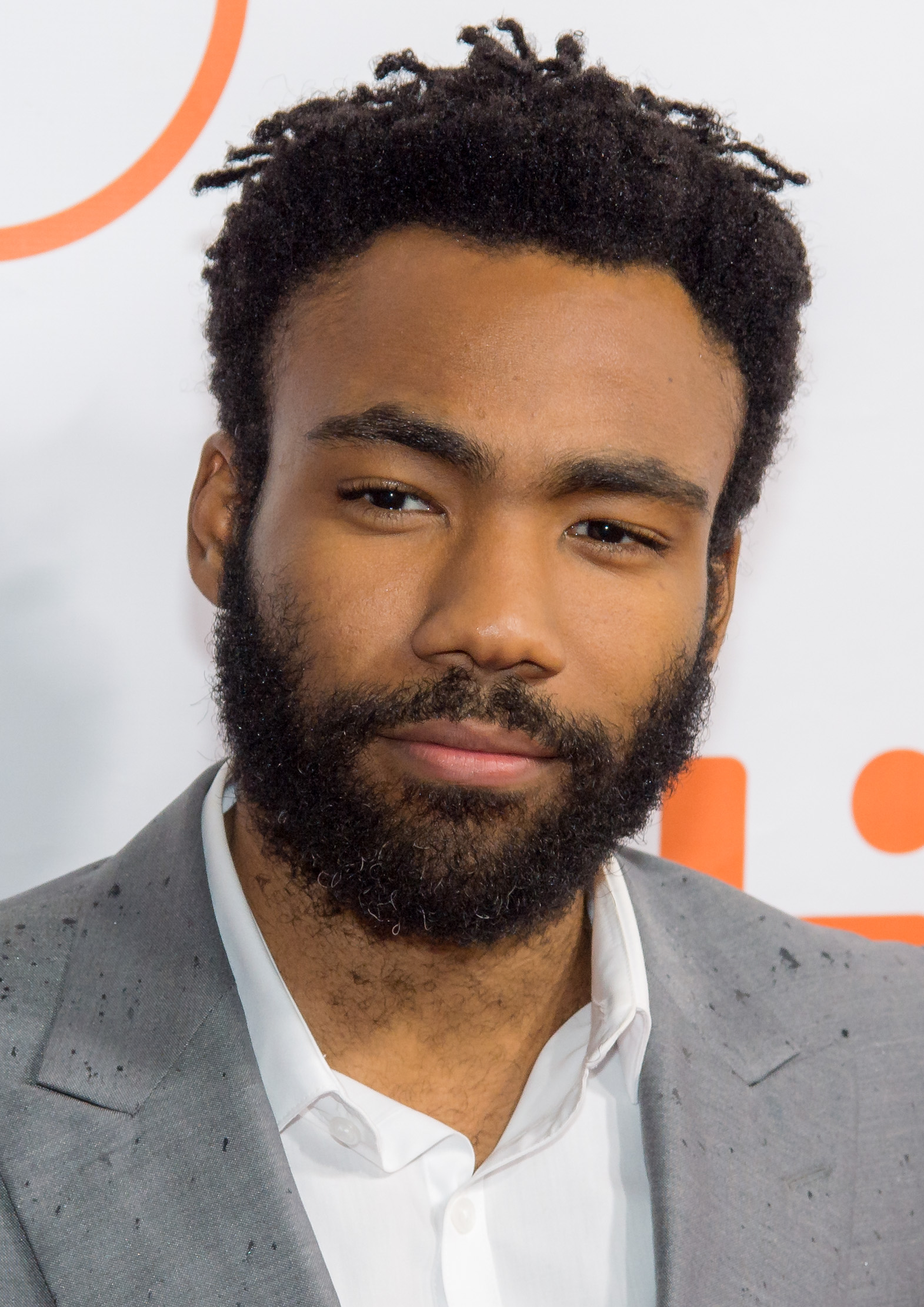
"This Is America" became Childish Gambino (pictured)'s first song to top the Canadian Hot 100 and the 25th song to debut at number one on the chart.

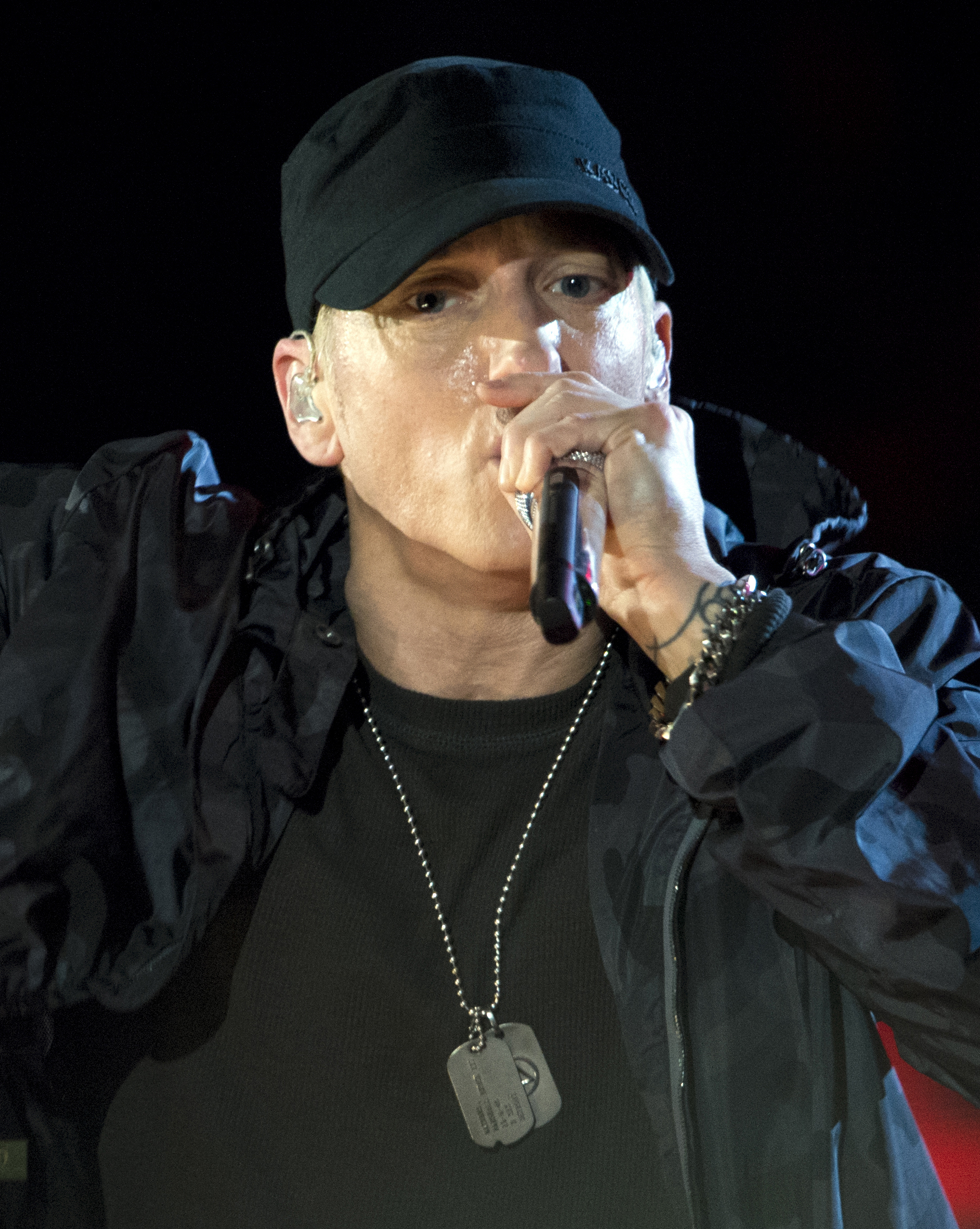
With "Killshot", Eminem (pictured) tied Justin Bieber and Taylor Swift for the most number-one debuts on the chart.

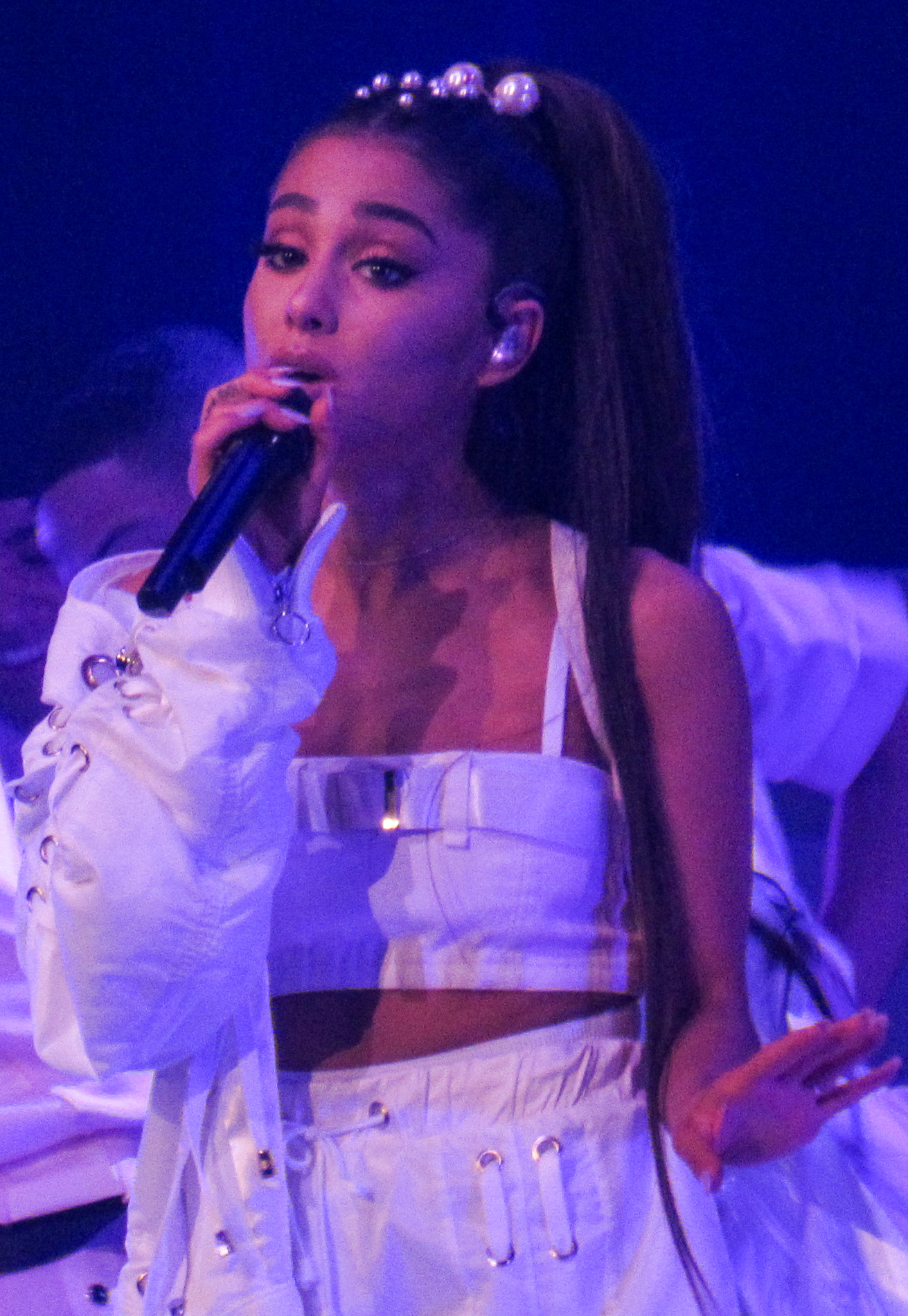
"Thank U, Next" became Ariana Grande (pictured)'s first song to top the Canadian Hot 100 and the 31st song to debut at number one on the chart.

Key
†	Indicates best-performing single of 2018

No.	Issue date	Song	Artist(s)	Ref.
122	January 3	"Perfect"	Ed Sheeran and Beyoncé	
122	January 6	"Perfect"	Ed Sheeran and Beyoncé	
122	January 13	"Perfect"	Ed Sheeran and Beyoncé	
122	January 20	"Perfect"	Ed Sheeran (Note: From this issue date, Billboard returned to credit solely Ed Sheeran for the chart performance of "Perfect" on the Canadian Hot 100.)	
re	January 27	"Havana" †	Camila Cabello featuring Young Thug	
123	February 3	"God's Plan"	Drake	
123	February 10	"God's Plan"	Drake	
123	February 17	"God's Plan"	Drake	
123	February 24	"God's Plan"	Drake	
123	March 3	"God's Plan"	Drake	
123	March 10	"God's Plan"	Drake	
123	March 17	"God's Plan"	Drake	
123	March 24	"God's Plan"	Drake	
123	March 31	"God's Plan"	Drake	
123	April 7	"God's Plan"	Drake	
124	April 14	"Call Out My Name"	The Weeknd	
125	April 21	"Nice for What"	Drake	
125	April 28	"Nice for What"	Drake	
125	May 5	"Nice for What"	Drake	
126	May 12	"Psycho"	Post Malone featuring Ty Dolla Sign	
127	May 19	"This Is America"	Childish Gambino	
127	May 26	"This Is America"	Childish Gambino	
127	June 2	"This Is America"	Childish Gambino	
re	June 9	"Nice for What"	Drake	
128	June 16	"Girls Like You"	Maroon 5 featuring Cardi B	
128	June 23	"Girls Like You"	Maroon 5 featuring Cardi B	
128	June 30	"Girls Like You"	Maroon 5 featuring Cardi B	
128	July 7	"Girls Like You"	Maroon 5 featuring Cardi B	
129	July 14	"Nonstop"	Drake	
130	July 21	"In My Feelings"	Drake	
130	July 28	"In My Feelings"	Drake	
130	August 4	"In My Feelings"	Drake	
130	August 11	"In My Feelings"	Drake	
130	August 18	"In My Feelings"	Drake	
130	August 25	"In My Feelings"	Drake	
130	September 1	"In My Feelings"	Drake	
re	September 8	"Girls Like You"	Maroon 5 featuring Cardi B	
re	September 15	"Girls Like You"	Maroon 5 featuring Cardi B	
131	September 22	"I Love It"	Kanye West and Lil Pump	
132	September 29	"Killshot"	Eminem	
132	October 6	"Killshot"	Eminem	
re	October 13	"Girls Like You"	Maroon 5 featuring Cardi B	
re	October 20	"Girls Like You"	Maroon 5 featuring Cardi B	
133	October 27	"Zeze"	Kodak Black featuring Travis Scott and Offset	
re	November 3	"Girls Like You"	Maroon 5 featuring Cardi B	
re	November 10	"Girls Like You"	Maroon 5 featuring Cardi B	
134	November 17	"Thank U, Next"	Ariana Grande	
134	November 24	"Thank U, Next"	Ariana Grande	
134	December 1	"Thank U, Next"	Ariana Grande	
134	December 8	"Thank U, Next"	Ariana Grande	
134	December 15	"Thank U, Next"	Ariana Grande	
134	December 22	"Thank U, Next"	Ariana Grande	
134	December 29	"Thank U, Next"	Ariana Grande	

== See also ==
- List of number-one albums of 2018 (Canada)
