= Lovely (Billie Eilish and Khalid song) =

2018 single by Billie Eilish and Khalid

Single by Billie Eilish and Khalid

from the album 13 Reasons Why: Season 2 (Music from the Original TV Series)
- Released: April 20, 2018
- Genre: Chamber pop
- Length: 3:20
- Label: Darkroom; Interscope
- Songwriters: Billie Eilish; Finneas O'Connell; Khalid Robinson
- Producer: Finneas O'Connell

Billie Eilish singles chronology
"Bitches Broken Hearts" (2018)	"Lovely" (2018)	"You Should See Me in a Crown" (2018)

Khalid singles chronology
"Love Lies" (2018)	"Lovely" (2018)	"OTW" (2018)

Music video
- "Lovely" on YouTube

"Lovely" is a song by American singers Billie Eilish and Khalid. Darkroom and Interscope Records released it as the lead single from the Netflix drama series 13 Reasons Why's second season soundtrack. The artists wrote the song with Eilish's brother and producer Finneas O'Connell. The song has been described as a chamber pop ballad whose lyrics recount Eilish and Khalid trying to overcome serious depression together. The song also appears on the expanded version of Eilish's EP Don't Smile at Me.

Upon its release, "Lovely" received widespread critical acclaim from music critics. The song reached number 64 on the US Billboard Hot 100 chart and peaked within the top 40 in several other countries. "Lovely" has been awarded several certifications, including 13× platinum by the Australian Recording Industry Association (ARIA). The track was accompanied by a music video released on April 26, 2018, depicting Eilish and Khalid walking around a glass case, interacting with each other, and trying to overcome their depression. Eilish included the track on the setlists of her 2019 When We All Fall Asleep Tour and her 2020 Where Do We Go? World Tour.

== Background and release ==
Darkroom and Interscope Records released "Lovely" on April 19, 2018, for digital download and streaming as the lead single for the album 13 Reasons Why: Season 2 (Music from the Original TV Series). The song was later included on the expanded edition of Eilish's debut EP Don't Smile at Me. Billie Eilish, Khalid and Finneas O'Connell wrote the track while production was handled solely by Finneas. Studio personnel, John Greenham and Rob Kinelski, handled mastering and mixing respectively. In an interview with Zane Lowe on Beats 1, Eilish explained the inspiration for the track's title: "We called it that because the song was sort of really freaking depressing so then it’s like oh, how lovely, just taking everything horrible like you know what this is great. I’m so happy being miserable." A remix by American electronic dance music duo Hippie Sabotage, was released on July 10, 2018, through SoundCloud. Dan Regan of Billboard praised the remix, saying it has "fresh vocals" and a "trap-style beat [that] buff new dimension into the song".

== Composition and lyrical interpretation ==
Critical commentary described "Lovely" as a chamber pop-based stripped back ballad. According to sheet music published by Universal Music Publishing Group at Musicnotes.com, it is written in the key of E minor with a moderately fast tempo of 115 beats per minute; its chord progression follows a basic sequence of Cmaj7–Em–Bm. The track features minimalist production that consists of piano, violin strings provided by Madison Leinster, and percussion. Eilish explained about working with Khalid and how the track was created to Zane Lowe: "One thing that I’ll say is that when we wrote this song, what was cool about it was that it wasn’t like we’re going to the studio and going to write a hit. He just came over and we hung out. Me and my brother hung out with Khalid in our house and it was literally this is us hanging out as friends and we ended up writing a song."

Claudia Willen of Insider describes "Lovely" as beginning with "Khalid's voice echoing Eilish's vocals." The pair "come together to harmonize in the chorus, singing about the feeling of being trapped inside of one's own mind". The duo sings in a melancholic tone. The song becomes more dramatic as the pair move into the chorus, as Eilish sings: "Isn't it lovely, all alone?/Heart made of glass, my mind of stone/Tear me to pieces, skin to bone/Hello, welcome home." Eilish and Khalid's voices sound hopeless as the song is coming to an end. "But I know someday I'll make it out of here/Even if it takes all night or a hundred years/Need a place to hide, but I can't find one near/Wanna feel alive, outside I can fight my fear", as backdrop piano and two chord strings accompany the lyrics.

== Critical reception ==
"Lovely" was met with widespread critical acclaim. Jon Blistein writing for Rolling Stone magazine called "Lovely" a "smoldering ballad". The Times' Raisa Bruner described the song as "somber" and "haunting", writing "[there] [is] little to celebrate in the dark, brooding lyrics, but still 'Lovely' finds beautiful sounds in that pained place". Mike Nied of Idolator commended the production, describing the strings as "heartrending" and the production "atmospheric". Robin Murray writing for Clash described the track as an "internet-shattering single", and a "bold, defiant gesture". The Evening Standard's David Smyth described Eilish's and Khalid's vocals in "Lovely" as a "grandiose duet".

Graham Corrigan writing for Complex magazine praised the song as an "intensely dramatic offering", and described Eilish's vocals as "smoky" acting "as quicksand, dragging the listener down to a dark place". He described Khalid's vocals as an "interesting counterpoint" to Eilish's. Variance's Tyler Schmitt called "Lovely" a track that "lives up to its name". NME's Hannah Mylrea called the song one of the best from the official soundtrack for the second season of 13 Reasons Why, saying, it has "lush strings", "interweaving vocals", and a "sizzling duet is properly gorgeous". Earmilk's Tanis Smither was similarly positive, saying "Lovely" is "dramatic and orchestral, with "heart-wrenching strings". Adrien Begrand from PopMatters affirmed the song shows Eilish's maturity "that makes the listener forget just how young she is".

Consequence of Sound ranked "Lovely" at number 15 on their list of 2018's best songs. Lake Schatz remarked that "Lovely" was "one of the most fragile offerings of [2018]", and comments that the song "showcases [Eilish's] versatility as an artist". The song placed at number four on Billboard's All 27 of Khalid's Collaborations, Ranked: Critic's Picks list, with the staff calling the song "beautiful" and "sorrowful". "Lovely" ranked at number 17 on Australia's Triple J's Hottest 100.

== Commercial performance ==
"Lovely" first entered the Bubbling Under Hot 100 chart at number two on May 4, 2018. The track rose to number 64 on the US Billboard Hot 100 chart on January 25, 2019. Following the release of Eilish's debut studio album When We All Fall Asleep, Where Do We Go?, "Lovely" re-entered the chart at number 85. At the same time, Eilish broke the record for the most simultaneous Hot 100 entries for a female artist. "Lovely" received a diamond certification from the Recording Industry Association of America (RIAA), which denotes track-equivalent sales of ten million units based on sales and streams.

In the United Kingdom, the single peaked at number 47 on the UK Singles Chart—Eilish's first song to chart in the UK. It received a quadruple-platinum certification from the British Phonographic Industry (BPI), which denotes track-equivalent sales of 2,400,000 units. "Lovely" peaked at number 46 on the Canadian Hot 100 and received diamond certification by Music Canada (MC). It was more commercially successful in Australia, peaking at number five on the ARIA Charts. It received a 13× platinum certification by the Australian Recording Industry Association (ARIA), which denotes track-equivalent sales of 910,000 units based on sales and streams.

== Music video ==
Taylor Cohen and Matty Peacock directed the music video for "Lovely". It was uploaded to Eilish's official YouTube channel on April 26, 2018. The video opens with Eilish trapped inside a crystalline box. Khalid then appears out of thin air behind her, wearing matching black threads and silver chains as he sings with her. Eilish and Khalid start to wander wearily around the box. A single rain cloud then unleashes rain and thunder. The singers sometimes separate, but manage to find their way back to each other. The rain from the cloud begins to freeze in the box and ice covers the walls as Khalid and Eilish hold each other. But as the video moves towards its end, the ice melts to reveal the box is empty. Eilish created the video's concept wanting to portray the feeling of being hopelessly trapped with another person.

=== Reception ===
The music video was positively received by critics. Blistein called the visual a "simple yet striking", while Nied said it was a "captivating spectacle complete with brilliant special effects that capture the severity of their situation". Chantilly Post writing for HotNewHipHop described that the video is "simple and striking at the same time". Madeline Roth of MTV said, "the visual is undeniably somber, but they at least seem to find some comfort in one another". Melissa Litterello of Soundigest called the visual "incredible", saying that her "eyes were glued throughout to see what would happen next" and said it was "definitely entertaining to watch".

== Live performances ==
Eilish performed "Lovely" during her North American 1 by 1 tour in 2018. She sang with Khalid at the Coachella Valley Music and Arts Festival Coachella Valley Music and Arts Festival with Khalid in April 2019. "Lovely" was included on the setlist of Eilish's 2019 When We All Fall Asleep Tour and her 2020 Where Do We Go? World Tour.

== Track listing ==
Digital download and streaming
No.	Title	Length
1.	"Lovely"	3:20

Digital download – Hippie Sabotage Remix
No.	Title	Length
1.	"Lovely" (Hippie Sabotage Remix)	4:47

== Credits and personnel ==
Credits adapted from Tidal.

- Billie Eilish – vocals, songwriter
- Khalid – vocals, songwriter
- Finneas O'Connell – producer, songwriter
- John Greenham – mastering engineer
- Rob Kinelski – mixer

== Charts ==
=== Weekly charts ===
Chart (2018–2026)	Peak position
Australia (ARIA)	5
Austria (Ö3 Austria Top 40)	60
Belgium (Ultratip Bubbling Under Flanders)	7
Belgium (Ultratip Bubbling Under Wallonia)	13
Canada Hot 100 (Billboard)	46
Czech Republic Singles Digital (ČNS IFPI)	32
France (SNEP)	117
Germany (GfK)	78
Global 200 (Billboard)	70
Greece International (IFPI)	10
Hungary (Single Top 40)	12
Hungary (Stream Top 40)	33
Ireland (IRMA)	25
Lithuania (AGATA)	48
Malaysia International (RIM)	20
Netherlands (Single Top 100)	55
New Zealand (Recorded Music NZ)	4
Nigeria Bubbling Under Hot 100 (TurnTable)	19
Norway (VG-lista)	39
Portugal (AFP)	14
Scotland Singles (Official Charts)	91
Slovakia Singles Digital (ČNS IFPI)	33
South Africa (RISA)	92
Sweden (Sverigetopplistan)	51
Switzerland (Schweizer Hitparade)	46
UK Singles (Official Charts)	47
UK Hip Hop/R&B (Official Charts)	19
US Billboard Hot 100	64
US Rolling Stone Top 100	80

=== Year-end charts ===
Chart (2018)	Position
Australia (ARIA)	41
New Zealand (Recorded Music NZ)	26
Portugal (AFP)	98

Chart (2019)	Position
Australia (ARIA)	47
Denmark (Tracklisten)	82
Iceland (Tónlistinn)	100
Latvia (LAIPA)	13
New Zealand (Recorded Music NZ)	39
Portugal (AFP)	77
Sweden (Sverigetopplistan)	72
US Rolling Stone Top 100	62

Chart (2020)	Position
France (SNEP)	175
Portugal (AFP)	71

Chart (2021)	Position
Global 200 (Billboard)	69

Chart (2022)	Position
Global 200 (Billboard)	73

Chart (2023)	Position
Global 200 (Billboard)	85
Switzerland (Schweizer Hitparade)	98

Chart (2024)	Position
Australia Hip Hop/R&B (ARIA)	33
France (SNEP)	196
Global 200 (Billboard)	100

Chart (2025)	Position
Belgium (Ultratop 50 Flanders)	195

== Certifications ==
Region	Certification	Certified units/sales
Australia (ARIA)	13× Platinum	910,000^{‡}
Austria (IFPI Austria)	4× Platinum	120,000^{‡}
Brazil (Pro-Música Brasil)	4× Diamond	640,000^{‡}
Canada (Music Canada)	Diamond	800,000^{‡}
Denmark (IFPI Danmark)	3× Platinum	270,000^{‡}
France (SNEP)	Platinum	200,000^{‡}
Germany (BVMI)	3× Gold	600,000^{‡}
Italy (FIMI)	2× Platinum	200,000^{‡}
Mexico (AMPROFON)	3× Platinum	180,000^{‡}
New Zealand (RMNZ)	9× Platinum	270,000^{‡}
Nigeria (TCSN)	Gold	50,000^{‡}
Norway (IFPI Norway)	3× Platinum	180,000^{‡}
Poland (ZPAV)	Diamond	250,000^{‡}
Portugal (AFP)	8× Platinum	80,000^{‡}
Spain (Promusicae)	3× Platinum	180,000^{‡}
United Kingdom (BPI)	4× Platinum	2,400,000^{‡}
United States (RIAA)	Diamond	10,000,000^{‡}
Streaming
Greece (IFPI Greece)	4× Platinum	8,000,000^{†}
Sweden (GLF)	2× Platinum	24,000,000^{†}
^{‡} Sales+streaming figures based on certification alone.^{†} Streaming-only figures based on certification alone.

== See also ==
- List of highest-certified singles in Australia
- List of top 10 singles for 2018 in Australia
