= List of number-one dance singles of 2018 (Australia) =

ARIA Charts number-one dance singles of 2018 < 2017 2019 >

Other Australian number-one charts of 2018
- albums
- singles
- urban singles
- club tracks
- digital tracks
- streaming tracks

Top Australian singles and albums of 2018
- Triple J Hottest 100
- top 25 singles
- top 25 albums

The ARIA Dance Chart is a chart that ranks the best-performing dance singles of Australia. It is published by Australian Recording Industry Association (ARIA), an organisation who collect music data for the weekly ARIA Charts. To be eligible to appear on the chart, the recording must be a single, and be "predominantly of a dance nature, or with a featured track of a dance nature, or included in the ARIA Club Chart or a comparable overseas chart".

== Chart history ==
Date	Song	Artist(s)	Ref.
1 January	"Silence"	Marshmello featuring Khalid	
8 January	"Silence"	Marshmello featuring Khalid	
15 January	"Silence"	Marshmello featuring Khalid	
22 January	"Silence"	Marshmello featuring Khalid	
29 January	"Silence"	Marshmello featuring Khalid	
5 February	"Go Bang"	Pnau	
12 February	"These Days"	Rudimental featuring Jess Glynne, Macklemore and Dan Caplen	
19 February	"These Days"	Rudimental featuring Jess Glynne, Macklemore and Dan Caplen	
26 February	"These Days"	Rudimental featuring Jess Glynne, Macklemore and Dan Caplen	
5 March	"These Days"	Rudimental featuring Jess Glynne, Macklemore and Dan Caplen	
12 March	"These Days"	Rudimental featuring Jess Glynne, Macklemore and Dan Caplen	
19 March	"These Days"	Rudimental featuring Jess Glynne, Macklemore and Dan Caplen	
26 March	"These Days"	Rudimental featuring Jess Glynne, Macklemore and Dan Caplen	
2 April	"These Days"	Rudimental featuring Jess Glynne, Macklemore and Dan Caplen	
9 April	"These Days"	Rudimental featuring Jess Glynne, Macklemore and Dan Caplen	
16 April	"These Days"	Rudimental featuring Jess Glynne, Macklemore and Dan Caplen	
23 April	"One Kiss"	Calvin Harris and Dua Lipa	
30 April	"One Kiss"	Calvin Harris and Dua Lipa	
7 May	"One Kiss"	Calvin Harris and Dua Lipa	
14 May	"One Kiss"	Calvin Harris and Dua Lipa	
21 May	"One Kiss"	Calvin Harris and Dua Lipa	
28 May	"One Kiss"	Calvin Harris and Dua Lipa	
4 June	"One Kiss"	Calvin Harris and Dua Lipa	
11 June	"One Kiss"	Calvin Harris and Dua Lipa	
18 June	"One Kiss"	Calvin Harris and Dua Lipa	
25 June	"One Kiss"	Calvin Harris and Dua Lipa	
2 July	"Solo"	Clean Bandit featuring Demi Lovato	
9 July	"Solo"	Clean Bandit featuring Demi Lovato	
16 July	"Solo"	Clean Bandit featuring Demi Lovato	
23 July	"Solo"	Clean Bandit featuring Demi Lovato	
30 July	"Nevermind"	Dennis Lloyd	
6 August	"Rise"	Jonas Blue featuring Jack & Jack	
13 August	"Rise"	Jonas Blue featuring Jack & Jack	
20 August	"Rise"	Jonas Blue featuring Jack & Jack	
27 August	"Rise"	Jonas Blue featuring Jack & Jack	
3 September	"Rise"	Jonas Blue featuring Jack & Jack	
10 September	"Rise"	Jonas Blue featuring Jack & Jack	
17 September	"Promises"	Calvin Harris and Sam Smith	
24 September	"Promises"	Calvin Harris and Sam Smith	
1 October	"Promises"	Calvin Harris and Sam Smith	
8 October	"Promises"	Calvin Harris and Sam Smith	
15 October	"Promises"	Calvin Harris and Sam Smith	
22 October	"Promises"	Calvin Harris and Sam Smith	
29 October	"Promises"	Calvin Harris and Sam Smith	
5 November	"Body"	Loud Luxury featuring Brando	
12 November	"Body"	Loud Luxury featuring Brando	
19 November	"Body"	Loud Luxury featuring Brando	
26 November	"Body"	Loud Luxury featuring Brando	
3 December	"Body"	Loud Luxury featuring Brando	
10 December	"Body"	Loud Luxury featuring Brando	
17 December	"Nothing Breaks Like a Heart"	Mark Ronson featuring Miley Cyrus	
24 December	"Nothing Breaks Like a Heart"	Mark Ronson featuring Miley Cyrus	
31 December	"Nothing Breaks Like a Heart"	Mark Ronson featuring Miley Cyrus	

== Number-one artists ==
Position	Artist	Weeks at No. 1
1	Calvin Harris	17
2	Rudimental	10
2	Jess Glynne (as featuring)	10
2	Dua Lipa	10
3	Sam Smith	7
4	Jonas Blue	6
4	Loud Luxury	6
4	Brando (as featuring)	6
5	Marshmello	5
6	Clean Bandit	4
6	Demi Lovato (as featuring)	4
7	Mark Ronson	3
7	Miley Cyrus (as featuring)	3
8	Pnau	1
8	Dennis Lloyd	1

== See also ==
- ARIA Charts
- List of number-one singles of 2018 (Australia)
- List of number-one club tracks of 2018 (Australia)
- 2018 in music
