= List of number-one club tracks of 2018 (Australia) =

ARIA Charts number-one club tracks of 2018 < 2017 2019 >

Other Australian number-one charts of 2018
- albums
- singles
- urban singles
- dance singles
- digital tracks
- streaming tracks

Top Australian singles and albums of 2018
- Triple J Hottest 100
- top 25 singles
- top 25 albums

This is the list of number-one tracks on the ARIA Club Chart in 2018, compiled by the Australian Recording Industry Association (ARIA) from weekly DJ reports.

== 2018 ==
Date		Song	Artist(s)	Reference
January	1	"Go Bang"	Pnau	
January	8	"Go Bang"	Pnau	
January	15	"Go Bang"	Pnau	
January	22	"Go Bang"	Pnau	
January	29	"Go Bang"	Pnau	
February	5	"Go Bang"	Pnau	
February	12	"Go Bang"	Pnau	
February	19	"Go Bang"	Pnau	
February	26	"Go Bang"	Pnau	
March	5	"Go Bang"	Pnau	
March	12	"Can't Buy This"	Colour Castle and Roland Clark	
March	19	"Can't Buy This"	Colour Castle and Roland Clark	
March	26	"Can't Buy This"	Colour Castle and Roland Clark	
April	2	"Can't Buy This"	Colour Castle and Roland Clark	
April	9	"Bizness"	Lo'99	
April	16	"Bizness"	Lo'99	
April	23	"Bizness"	Lo'99	
April	30	"Bizness"	Lo'99	
May	7	"Panic Room"	Au/Ra and CamelPhat	
May	14	"Panic Room"	Au/Ra and CamelPhat	
May	21	"Panic Room"	Au/Ra and CamelPhat	
May	28	"About a Place"	Tim Light and Tom Evans	
June	4	"About a Place"	Tim Light and Tom Evans	
June	11	"One Way"	Hood Rich and Stace Cadet	
June	18	"Legacy"	JaySounds featuring Kwame	
June	25	"Hot Sauce"	Torren Foot	
July	2	"Hot Sauce"	Torren Foot	
July	9	"One Kiss"	Calvin Harris and Dua Lipa	
July	16	"One Kiss"	Calvin Harris and Dua Lipa	
July	23	"At Night"	Shakedown	
July	30	"At Night"	Shakedown	
August	6	"At Night"	Shakedown	
August	13	"At Night"	Shakedown	
August	20	"Losing It"	Fisher	
August	27	"Losing It"	Fisher	
September	3	"Come with Me"	Colour Castle and VØ	
September	10	"Come with Me"	Colour Castle and VØ	
September	17	"Come with Me"	Colour Castle and VØ	
September	24	"Come with Me"	Colour Castle and VØ	
October	1	"Take It"	Dom Dolla	
October	8	"Feel My Needs"	Weiss	
October	15	"Take It"	Dom Dolla	
October	22	"Take It"	Dom Dolla	
October	29	"Promises"	Calvin Harris and Sam Smith	
November	5	"Promises"	Calvin Harris and Sam Smith	
November	12	"Promises"	Calvin Harris and Sam Smith	
November	19	"Promises"	Calvin Harris and Sam Smith	
November	26	"Darkbeat"	Ivan Gough and Andy Murphy	
December	3	"Praise You"	Fatboy Slim	
December	10	"Praise You"	Fatboy Slim	
December	17	"Praise You"	Fatboy Slim	
December	24	"Faith"	Benson featuring Stace Cadet and Yeah Boy	
December	31	"Faith"	Benson featuring Stace Cadet and Yeah Boy	

== Number-one artists ==
Position	Artist	Weeks at No. 1
1	Pnau	10
2	Colour Castle	8
3	Calvin Harris	6
4	Roland Clark	4
4	VØ	4
4	Sam Smith	4
5	Au/Ra	3
5	CamelPhat	3
5	Shakedown	3
5	Dom Dolla	3
5	Fatboy Slim	3
5	Stace Cadet	3
6	Tim Light	2
6	Tom Evans	2
6	Torren Foot	2
6	Dua Lipa	2
6	Fisher	2
6	Benson	2
6	Yeah Boy	2
7	Hood Rich	1
7	JaySounds	1
7	Kwame	1
7	Weiss	1
7	Ivan Gough	1
7	Andy Murphy	1

== See also ==
- ARIA Charts
- List of number-one singles of 2018 (Australia)
- List of number-one albums of 2018 (Australia)
- List of number-one dance singles of 2018 (Australia)
- 2018 in music
