= List of number-one urban singles of 2018 (Australia) =

ARIA Charts number-one urban singles of 2018 < 2017 2019 >

Other Australian number-one charts of 2018
- albums
- singles
- dance singles
- club tracks
- digital tracks
- streaming tracks

Top Australian singles and albums of 2018
- Triple J Hottest 100
- top 25 singles
- top 25 albums

The ARIA Urban Chart is a chart that ranks the best-performing Urban tracks singles of Australia. It is published by the Australian Recording Industry Association (ARIA), an organisation who collect music data for the weekly ARIA Charts. To be eligible to appear on the chart, the recording must be a single of a predominantly urban nature.

== Chart history ==
Issue date	Song	Artist(s)	Reference
1 January	"River"	Eminem featuring Ed Sheeran	
8 January	"River"	Eminem featuring Ed Sheeran	
15 January	"I Fall Apart"	Post Malone	
22 January	"I Fall Apart"	Post Malone	
29 January	"I Fall Apart"	Post Malone	
5 February	"God's Plan"	Drake	
12 February	"God's Plan"	Drake	
19 February	"God's Plan"	Drake	
26 February	"God's Plan"	Drake	
5 March	"God's Plan"	Drake	
12 March	"God's Plan"	Drake	
19 March	"God's Plan"	Drake	
26 March	"God's Plan"	Drake	
2 April	"God's Plan"	Drake	
9 April	"God's Plan"	Drake	
16 April	"God's Plan"	Drake	
23 April	"Nice for What"	Drake	
30 April	"Nice for What"	Drake	
7 May	"Psycho"	Post Malone featuring Ty Dolla Sign	
14 May	"Nice for What"	Drake	
21 May	"This Is America"	Childish Gambino	
28 May	"Better Now"	Post Malone	
4 June	"Better Now"	Post Malone	
11 June	"Better Now"	Post Malone	
18 June	"Better Now"	Post Malone	
25 June	"Better Now"	Post Malone	
2 July	"Better Now"	Post Malone	
9 July	"Don't Matter to Me"	Drake featuring Michael Jackson	
16 July	"In My Feelings"	Drake	
23 July	"In My Feelings"	Drake	
30 July	"In My Feelings"	Drake	
6 August	"In My Feelings"	Drake	
13 August	"In My Feelings"	Drake	
20 August	"In My Feelings"	Drake	
27 August	"In My Feelings"	Drake	
3 September	"In My Feelings"	Drake	
10 September	"Lucky You"	Eminem featuring Joyner Lucas	
17 September	"I Love It"	Kanye West and Lil Pump	
24 September	"I Love It"	Kanye West and Lil Pump	
1 October	"I Love It"	Kanye West and Lil Pump	
8 October	"I Love It"	Kanye West and Lil Pump	
15 October	"I Love It"	Kanye West and Lil Pump	
22 October	"I Love It"	Kanye West and Lil Pump	
29 October	"Better"	Khalid	
5 November	"Sunflower"	Post Malone and Swae Lee	
12 November	"Sunflower"	Post Malone and Swae Lee	
19 November	"Sunflower"	Post Malone and Swae Lee	
26 November	"Sunflower"	Post Malone and Swae Lee	
3 December	"Sunflower"	Post Malone and Swae Lee	
10 December	"Sunflower"	Post Malone and Swae Lee	
17 December	"Sunflower"	Post Malone and Swae Lee	
24 December	"Sunflower"	Post Malone and Swae Lee	
31 December	"Sunflower"	Post Malone and Swae Lee	

== Number-one artists ==
Position	Artist	Weeks at No. 1
1	Drake	23
2	Post Malone	19
3	Swae Lee	9
4	Kanye West	6
4	Lil Pump	6
5	Eminem	3
6	Ed Sheeran (as featuring)	2
7	Childish Gambino	1
7	Michael Jackson (as featuring)	1
7	Ty Dolla Sign (as featuring)	1
7	Joyner Lucas (as featuring)	1
7	Khalid	1

== See also ==
- 2018 in music
- List of number-one singles of 2018 (Australia)
