= List of number-one digital tracks of 2018 (Australia) =

ARIA Charts number-one digital tracks of 2018 < 2017 2019 >

Other Australian number-one charts of 2018
- albums
- singles
- urban singles
- dance singles
- club tracks
- streaming tracks

Top Australian singles and albums of 2018
- Triple J Hottest 100
- top 25 singles
- top 25 albums

The ARIA Digital Track Chart is a chart that ranks the best-performing digital tracks singles of Australia. It is published by Australian Recording Industry Association (ARIA), an organisation who collect music data for the weekly ARIA Charts. To be eligible to appear on the chart, the recording must be a single not an EP and only paid downloads counted from downloadable outlets.

== Chart history ==
Key
†	Indicates number-one digital single of 2018

Issue date	Song	Artist(s)	Reference
1 January	"Havana"	Camila Cabello featuring Young Thug	
8 January	"Havana"	Camila Cabello featuring Young Thug	
15 January	"Meant To Be"	Bebe Rexha featuring Florida Georgia Line	
22 January	"Meant To Be"	Bebe Rexha featuring Florida Georgia Line	
29 January	"Meant To Be"	Bebe Rexha featuring Florida Georgia Line	
5 February	"Meant To Be"	Bebe Rexha featuring Florida Georgia Line	
12 February	"These Days"	Rudimental featuring Jess Glynne, Macklemore and Dan Caplen	
19 February	"These Days"	Rudimental featuring Jess Glynne, Macklemore and Dan Caplen	
26 February	"Meant to Be"	Bebe Rexha featuring Florida Georgia Line	
5 March	"Psycho"	Post Malone featuring Ty Dolla Sign	
12 March	"Meant to Be"	Bebe Rexha featuring Florida Georgia Line	
19 March	"These Days"	Rudimental featuring Jess Glynne, Macklemore and Dan Caplen	
26 March	"These Days"	Rudimental featuring Jess Glynne, Macklemore and Dan Caplen	
2 April	"In My Blood"	Shawn Mendes	
9 April	"Friends"	Marshmello and Anne-Marie	
16 April	"Zombie"	Bad Wolves	
23 April	"Zombie"	Bad Wolves	
30 April	"No Tears Left to Cry"	Ariana Grande	
7 May	"One Kiss"	Calvin Harris and Dua Lipa	
14 May	"I Said Hi"	Amy Shark	
21 May	"Youngblood"†	5 Seconds of Summer	
28 May	"Youngblood"†	5 Seconds of Summer	
4 June	"Youngblood"†	5 Seconds of Summer	
11 June	"Youngblood"†	5 Seconds of Summer	
18 June	"Youngblood"†	5 Seconds of Summer	
25 June	"Youngblood"†	5 Seconds of Summer	
2 July	"Youngblood"†	5 Seconds of Summer	
9 July	"Youngblood"†	5 Seconds of Summer	
16 July	"Youngblood"†	5 Seconds of Summer	
23 July	"In My Feelings"	Drake	
30 July	"In My Feelings"	Drake	
6 August	"Be Alright"	Dean Lewis	
13 August	"Be Alright"	Dean Lewis	
20 August	"Be Alright"	Dean Lewis	
27 August	"Be Alright"	Dean Lewis	
3 September	"Be Alright"	Dean Lewis	
10 September	"Shotgun"	George Ezra	
17 September	"Shotgun"	George Ezra	
24 September	"Shotgun"	George Ezra	
1 October	"Shotgun"	George Ezra	
8 October	"Shotgun"	George Ezra	
15 October	"Shotgun"	George Ezra	
22 October	"Shotgun"	George Ezra	
29 October	"Shallow"	Lady Gaga and Bradley Cooper	
5 November	"Shallow"	Lady Gaga and Bradley Cooper	
12 November	"Shallow"	Lady Gaga and Bradley Cooper	
19 November	"Shallow"	Lady Gaga and Bradley Cooper	
26 November	"Shallow"	Lady Gaga and Bradley Cooper	
3 December	"Shallow"	Lady Gaga and Bradley Cooper	
10 December	"Shallow"	Lady Gaga and Bradley Cooper	
17 December	"Shallow"	Lady Gaga and Bradley Cooper	
24 December	"Shotgun"	George Ezra	
31 December	"Shotgun"	George Ezra	

== Number-one artists ==
Position	Artist	Weeks at No. 1
1	5 Seconds of Summer	9
1	George Ezra	9
2	Lady Gaga	8
2	Bradley Cooper	8
3	Bebe Rexha	6
3	Florida Georgia Line (as featuring)	6
4	Dean Lewis	5
5	Rudimental	4
5	Macklemore (as featuring)	4
5	Jess Glynne (as featuring)	4
5	Dan Caplen (as featuring)	4
6	Camila Cabello	2
6	Young Thug (as featuring)	2
6	Bad Wolves	2
6	Drake	2
7	Post Malone	1
7	Ty Dolla Sign (as featuring)	1
7	Shawn Mendes	1
7	Marshmello	1
7	Anne-Marie	1
7	Ariana Grande	1
7	Calvin Harris	1
7	Dua Lipa	1
7	Amy Shark	1

== See also ==
- 2018 in music
- ARIA Charts
- List of number-one singles of 2018 (Australia)
