= List of number-one singles of 2018 (Australia) =

ARIA Charts number-one singles of 2018 < 2017 2019 >

Other Australian number-one charts of 2018
- albums
- urban singles
- dance singles
- club tracks
- digital tracks
- streaming tracks

Top Australian singles and albums of 2018
- Triple J Hottest 100
- top 25 singles
- top 25 albums

The ARIA Singles Chart ranks the best-performing singles in Australia. Its data, published by the Australian Recording Industry Association, is based collectively on the weekly physical and digital sales and streams of singles. In 2018, 13 singles have claimed the top spot, including Ed Sheeran's "Perfect", which started its peak position in 2017. Six acts, Ariana Grande, Ty Dolla Sign, Childish Gambino, Dean Lewis, George Ezra and Bradley Cooper, reached the top spot for the first time.

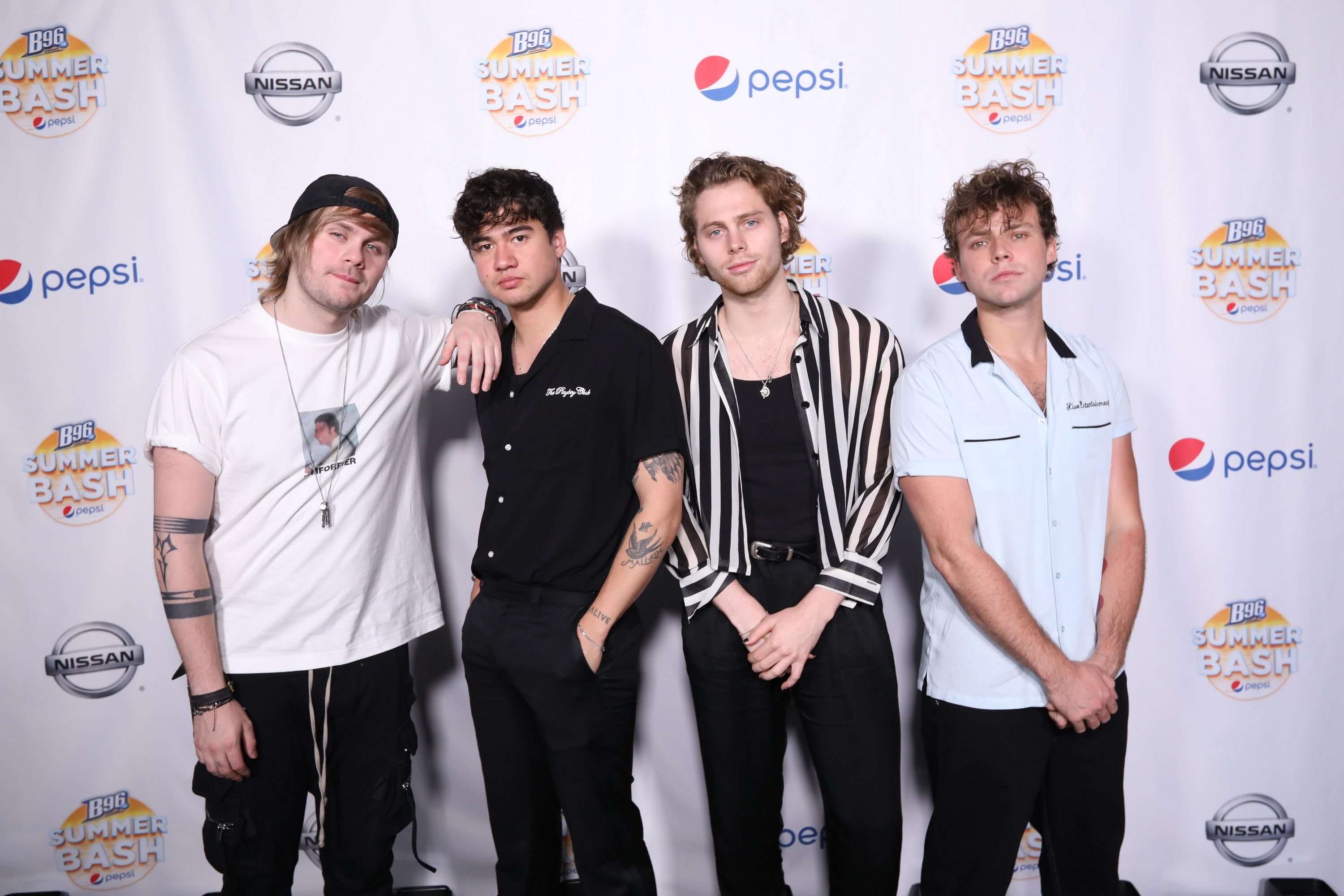
Australian pop rock band 5 Seconds of Summer earned their second number-one single in 2018 with "Youngblood" which spent eight weeks at number one. They became the first Australians along with Dean Lewis and his song "Be Alright" to reach number one in Australia since 2016.

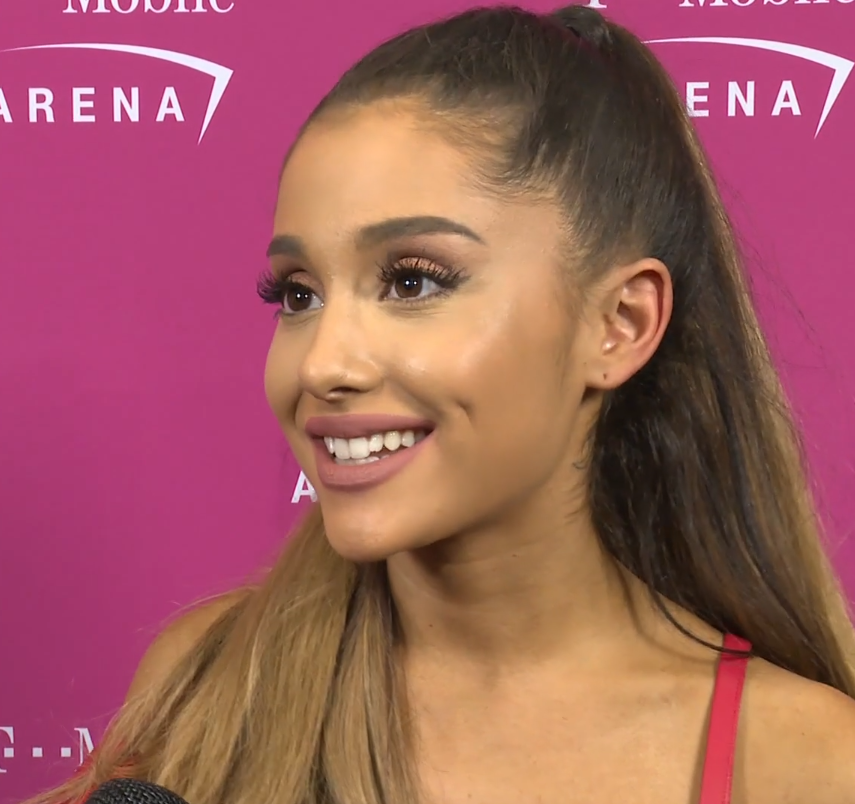
American pop singer Ariana Grande earned her first and second number-one singles in 2018 with "No Tears Left to Cry" and "Thank U, Next", the former of which spent one week at number one and the latter which spent six weeks at number one.

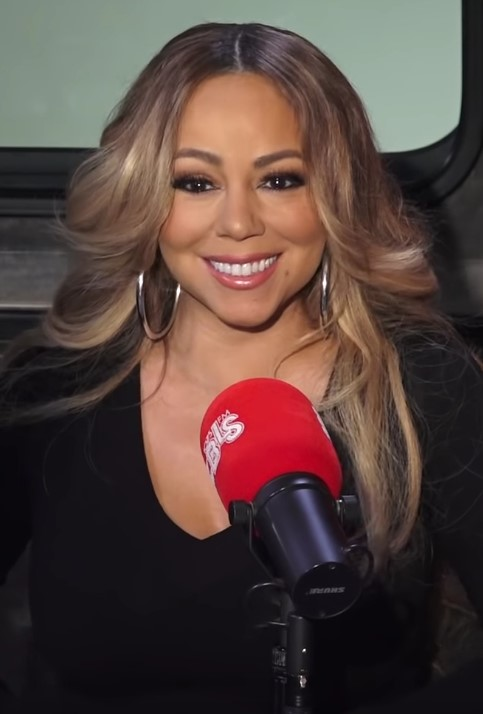
American singer Mariah Carey earned her third number-one single with the 1994 single, "All I Want for Christmas Is You" in 2018. It was the first Christmas song to reach number one in Australia in nearly thirty-four years; the last being "Do They Know It's Christmas?" by Band Aid in January 1985. It was also the oldest song to initially reach number one in the country, taking twenty-four years to reach the top spot. Carey's last number one in Australia was "We Belong Together", which reached number one in 2005.

== Chart history ==
Key
†	Indicates the #1 song on ARIA's End of Year Singles Chart of 2018.

Issue date	Song	Artist(s)	Ref.
1 January	"Perfect"	Ed Sheeran	
8 January	"Perfect"	Ed Sheeran	
15 January	"Perfect"	Ed Sheeran	
22 January	"Perfect"	Ed Sheeran	
29 January	"Perfect"	Ed Sheeran	
5 February	"God's Plan"	Drake	
12 February	"God's Plan"	Drake	
19 February	"God's Plan"	Drake	
26 February	"God's Plan"	Drake	
5 March	"God's Plan"	Drake	
12 March	"God's Plan"	Drake	
19 March	"God's Plan"	Drake	
26 March	"God's Plan"	Drake	
2 April	"God's Plan"	Drake	
9 April	"God's Plan"	Drake	
16 April	"God's Plan"	Drake	
23 April	"Nice for What"	Drake	
30 April	"No Tears Left to Cry"	Ariana Grande	
7 May	"Psycho"	Post Malone featuring Ty Dolla Sign	
14 May	"Nice for What"	Drake	
21 May	"This Is America"	Childish Gambino	
28 May	"Youngblood" †	5 Seconds of Summer	
4 June	"Youngblood" †	5 Seconds of Summer	
11 June	"Youngblood" †	5 Seconds of Summer	
18 June	"Youngblood" †	5 Seconds of Summer	
25 June	"Youngblood" †	5 Seconds of Summer	
2 July	"Youngblood" †	5 Seconds of Summer	
9 July	"Youngblood" †	5 Seconds of Summer	
16 July	"Youngblood" †	5 Seconds of Summer	
23 July	"In My Feelings"	Drake	
30 July	"In My Feelings"	Drake	
6 August	"In My Feelings"	Drake	
13 August	"In My Feelings"	Drake	
20 August	"Be Alright"	Dean Lewis	
27 August	"Be Alright"	Dean Lewis	
3 September	"Be Alright"	Dean Lewis	
10 September	"Be Alright"	Dean Lewis	
17 September	"Be Alright"	Dean Lewis	
24 September	"Shotgun"	George Ezra	
1 October	"Shotgun"	George Ezra	
8 October	"Shotgun"	George Ezra	
15 October	"Shotgun"	George Ezra	
22 October	"Shotgun"	George Ezra	
29 October	"Shallow"	Lady Gaga and Bradley Cooper	
5 November	"Shallow"	Lady Gaga and Bradley Cooper	
12 November	"Shallow"	Lady Gaga and Bradley Cooper	
19 November	"Thank U, Next"	Ariana Grande	
26 November	"Thank U, Next"	Ariana Grande	
3 December	"Thank U, Next"	Ariana Grande	
10 December	"Thank U, Next"	Ariana Grande	
17 December	"Thank U, Next"	Ariana Grande	
24 December	"Thank U, Next"	Ariana Grande	
31 December	"All I Want for Christmas Is You"	Mariah Carey	

== Number-one artists ==
Position	Artist	Weeks at No. 1
1	Drake	17
2	5 Seconds of Summer	8
3	Ariana Grande	7
4	Ed Sheeran	5
4	Dean Lewis	5
4	George Ezra	5
5	Lady Gaga	3
5	Bradley Cooper	3
6	Post Malone	1
6	Ty Dolla Sign (as featuring)	1
6	Childish Gambino	1
6	Mariah Carey	1

== See also ==
- 2018 in music
- List of number-one albums of 2018 (Australia)
- List of top 10 singles in 2018 (Australia)
