= List of number-one albums of 2018 (Australia) =

ARIA Charts number-one albums of 2018 < 2017 2019 >

Other Australian number-one charts of 2018
- singles
- urban singles
- dance singles
- club tracks
- digital tracks
- streaming tracks

Top Australian singles and albums of 2018
- Triple J Hottest 100
- top 25 singles
- top 25 albums

The ARIA Albums Chart ranks the best-performing albums and extended plays (EPs) in Australia. Its data, published by the Australian Recording Industry Association, is based collectively on the weekly physical and digital sales of albums and EPs. In 2018, 25 albums have claimed the top spot, including Ed Sheeran's ÷, which spent 21 weeks at number one on the chart in 2017. Nine acts, Geoffrey Gurrumul Yunupingu, J. Cole, Post Malone, Shawn Mendes, Sheppard, Amy Shark, Travis Scott, Twenty One Pilots and Bradley Cooper, achieved their first number-one album in Australia.

== Chart history ==
Key
The yellow background indicates the #1 album on ARIA's End of Year Albums Chart of 2018.

Date	Album	Artist(s)	Ref.
1 January	÷	Ed Sheeran	
8 January	The Greatest Showman: Original Motion Picture Soundtrack	Various artists	
15 January	The Greatest Showman: Original Motion Picture Soundtrack	Various artists	
22 January	The Greatest Showman: Original Motion Picture Soundtrack	Various artists	
29 January	The Greatest Showman: Original Motion Picture Soundtrack	Various artists	
5 February	The Greatest Showman: Original Motion Picture Soundtrack	Various artists	
12 February	The Greatest Showman: Original Motion Picture Soundtrack	Various artists	
19 February	The Greatest Showman: Original Motion Picture Soundtrack	Various artists	
26 February	The Greatest Showman: Original Motion Picture Soundtrack	Various artists	
5 March	Nation of Two	Vance Joy	
12 March	÷	Ed Sheeran	
19 March	÷	Ed Sheeran	
26 March	÷	Ed Sheeran	
2 April	÷	Ed Sheeran	
9 April	÷	Ed Sheeran	
16 April	Golden	Kylie Minogue	
23 April	Djarimirri (Child of the Rainbow)	Geoffrey Gurrumul Yunupingu	
30 April	KOD	J. Cole	
7 May	Beerbongs & Bentleys	Post Malone	
14 May	Reverence	Parkway Drive	
21 May	Tranquility Base Hotel & Casino	Arctic Monkeys	
28 May	Beerbongs & Bentleys	Post Malone	
4 June	Shawn Mendes	Shawn Mendes	
11 June	Ye	Kanye West	
18 June	Watching the Sky	Sheppard	
25 June	Youngblood	5 Seconds of Summer	
2 July	Pray for the Wicked	Panic! at the Disco	
9 July	Scorpion	Drake	
16 July	Scorpion	Drake	
23 July	Love Monster	Amy Shark	
30 July	Mamma Mia! Here We Go Again: The Movie Soundtrack	Various artists	
6 August	Mamma Mia! Here We Go Again: The Movie Soundtrack	Various artists	
13 August	Astroworld	Travis Scott	
20 August	Scorpion	Drake	
27 August	Sweetener	Ariana Grande	
3 September	Misery	The Amity Affliction	
10 September	Kamikaze	Eminem	
17 September	Kamikaze	Eminem	
24 September	Kamikaze	Eminem	
1 October	Kamikaze	Eminem	
8 October	Home	John Butler Trio	
15 October	Trench	Twenty One Pilots	
22 October	Nature	Paul Kelly	
29 October	A Star Is Born	Lady Gaga and Bradley Cooper	
5 November	A Star Is Born	Lady Gaga and Bradley Cooper	
12 November	A Star Is Born	Lady Gaga and Bradley Cooper	
19 November	A Star Is Born	Lady Gaga and Bradley Cooper	
26 November	A Star Is Born	Lady Gaga and Bradley Cooper	
3 December	A Star Is Born	Lady Gaga and Bradley Cooper	
10 December	A Star Is Born	Lady Gaga and Bradley Cooper	
17 December	A Star Is Born	Lady Gaga and Bradley Cooper	
24 December	A Star Is Born	Lady Gaga and Bradley Cooper	
31 December	A Star Is Born	Lady Gaga and Bradley Cooper	

== Number-one artists ==
Position	Artist	Weeks at No. 1
1	Lady Gaga	10
1	Bradley Cooper	10
2	Ed Sheeran	6
3	Eminem	4
4	Drake	3
5	Post Malone	2
6	Vance Joy	1
6	Kylie Minogue	1
6	Geoffrey Gurrumul Yunupingu	1
6	J. Cole	1
6	Parkway Drive	1
6	Arctic Monkeys	1
6	Shawn Mendes	1
6	Kanye West	1
6	Sheppard	1
6	5 Seconds of Summer	1
6	Panic! at the Disco	1
6	Amy Shark	1
6	Travis Scott	1
6	Ariana Grande	1
6	The Amity Affliction	1
6	John Butler Trio	1
6	Twenty One Pilots	1
6	Paul Kelly	1

== See also ==
- 2018 in music
- List of number-one singles of 2018 (Australia)
