= In My Feelings =

2018 song by Drake

Single by Drake

from the album Scorpion
- Released: July 10, 2018
- Recorded: 2017
- Genre: Bounce; Hip-hop
- Length: 3:37
- Label: Young Money; Cash Money; Republic
- Songwriters: Aubrey Graham; Benny Workman; Darius Harrison; Nick Kobe; Caresha Brownlee; Jatavia Johnson; Stephen Garrett; James Scheffer; Rex Zamor; Dwayne Carter, Jr.; Ibra Ake; Renetta Lowe-Bridgewater; Orville Hall; Phillip Price; Noah Shebib
- Producers: TrapMoneyBenny; Blaqnmild

Drake singles chronology
"Don't Matter to Me" (2018)	"In My Feelings" (2018)	"Nonstop" (2018)

Music video
- "In My Feelings" on YouTube

"In My Feelings" is a song by Canadian rapper Drake from his fifth studio album Scorpion (2018). It was released to rhythmic and contemporary hit radio on July 10, 2018, as the album's fifth single. The song features additional vocals by the City Girls, though they are uncredited on the official version. The song topped the Billboard Hot 100 chart for ten weeks and broke several records.

== Composition and samples ==
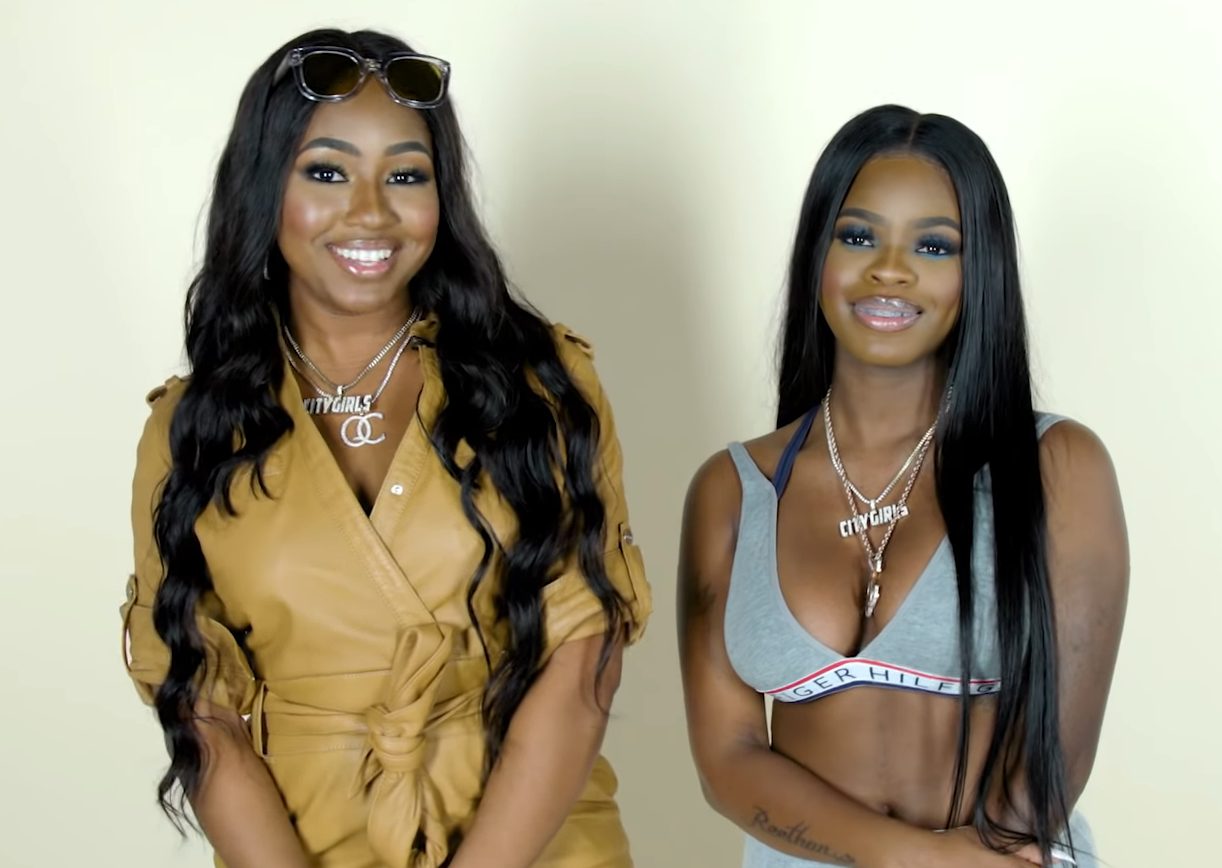
American rap duo City Girls provide additional vocals on the track.

"In My Feelings" is a bounce track. Upon its release, several outlets reported that the song and "Kiki" was about Keshia Chanté, Drake's first girlfriend and childhood friend from Toronto. It was also reported that "KB" was K'yanna Barber, a resident of Oakland, California. Drake also makes references to Jennifer Lopez ("Jenny"), whom he briefly dated in 2016, and Quality Control duo City Girls, made up of members Yung Miami ("Resha") and JT. The City Girls also provide uncredited vocals.

The track samples "Smoking Gun (Acapella Version)" by Magnolia Shorty for the breakdown. "Lollipop" by Lil Wayne is also sampled and the track ends with audio from the episode "Champagne Papi" from the television series Atlanta. The song was later slightly altered and re-uploaded to streaming sites with additional sampled vocals from Lil Wayne.

== Release and reception ==
The song inspired an Internet meme dance challenge known as the "Kiki Challenge", "In My Feelings Challenge" or "DoTheShiggy", the latter being a reference to the comedian Shiggy, who posted a video on his Instagram account of him dancing to the song; this video was credited for inspiring the challenge. The dance challenge is to walk outside of moving vehicles (ghost riding) and dance in oncoming traffic. Originating in the US, the challenge later spread to other parts of the world where in some countries it caused controversy and public concern. The challenge is subject to fines on public roads in the Philippines. The challenge is featured in the heavily panned 2018 YouTube Rewind.

The Fader deemed the bounce track as the highlight of the double album, with writer Ben Dandrige-Lemco saying, "it takes a whole 20 songs to get to the best part of the album, 'In My Feelings'". The Hollywood Reporter's Jonny Coleman felt that the song, along with "Nice for What", "might be two of the most enduring tracks [in the album]". Andy Hutchins of Time called the song "a disastrous misunderstanding of New Orleans bounce." Billboard named "In My Feelings" the 42nd-best song of 2018.

== Commercial performance ==
In the Billboard magazine issue dated July 14, 2018, "In My Feelings" debuted at number six on the Billboard Hot 100, one of seven top 10 entries by Drake that week. The following week, partly due to the rising popularity of the dance challenge associated with the song, it ascended to the top spot of the chart, becoming Drake's sixth number-one single on the chart. On the issue dated July 28, 2018, "In My Feelings" broke the streaming record for the most streams in a single week with 116.2 million streams (later being broken by "Old Town Road" by Lil Nas X & Billy Ray Cyrus on the week of April 13, 2019, which has the current record of 143 million streams) and retained the top spot on the chart. It remained on top for ten consecutive weeks until it was unseated by "Girls Like You" by Maroon 5 featuring Cardi B. It ultimately remained in the top ten for 14 weeks. It also reached number one on the Canadian Hot 100 and the UK Singles Chart.

In the UK, it did not enter the charts on the first week due to chart rules, but the next week, due to the popularity of the dance challenge, it entered at number four. A week later, it rose to number one, becoming Drake's fifth number one in the UK and his third consecutive number one in 2018. "In My Feelings" spent four weeks at the top of the chart, before being replaced by "Shotgun" by George Ezra.

The success of "In My Feelings" made Drake the record holder for most number one hits among rappers in the history of the Hot 100 chart.

== Music video ==
The song's music video was shot on July 23, 2018, in New Orleans and was directed by Karena Evans, whom Drake previously worked with on the videos for "God's Plan", "Nice for What", and "I'm Upset" earlier in the year.

The song's music video was released on August 2, 2018, on Drake's YouTube channel. "KeKe" is played by La La Anthony while her mother is played by Phylicia Rashad. The video takes place in New Orleans and shows people dancing to the song, including Yung Miami of the City Girls and bounce music legend Big Freedia. Comedian Shiggy, who has been credited with inventing the viral "In My Feelings Challenge", makes a cameo as a production assistant as well as a dancer in the video. At the end of the music video, a small montage of celebrities and internet influencers participating in the "In My Feelings Challenge" is displayed. A few of these people include Will Smith, DJ Khaled, J-Hope of BTS, Steve Aoki, Odell Beckham Jr., Dua Lipa, Millie Bobby Brown, Liza Koshy, Noah Schnapp, Filipina dancer and influencer Niana Guerrero, Ryan Seacrest, Shay Mitchell, Bobby Berk, Tan France, Karamo Brown, Antoni Porowski, Jonathan Van Ness, Sonya DeVille and Ciara.

As of October 2026, the music video on YouTube has amassed more than 302 million views.

== Awards and nominations ==
Year	Organization	Award	Result
2018	MTV Video Music Awards	Song of Summer	Nominated
2018	BreakTudo Awards	Hit of the Year	Nominated
2018	Soul Train Music Awards	Rhythm & Bars Award	Won
2019	Global Awards	Best Song	Nominated
2019	iHeartRadio Music Awards	Hip-Hop Song of the Year	Nominated

== Personnel ==
Credits adapted from the album's liner notes and Tidal.

- Noah "40" Shebib – production, recording
- Noel "Gadget" Campbell – mixing
- Harley Arsenault – mixing assistance, recording assistance
- Greg Moffet – mixing assistance, recording assistance
- Ronald Moonoo – mixing assistance
- Blaqnmild – production
- TrapMoneyBenny – production

== Charts ==
=== Weekly charts ===
Chart (2018–2019)	Peak position
Argentina (Argentina Hot 100)	58
Australia (ARIA)	1
Austria (Ö3 Austria Top 40)	3
Belgium (Ultratop 50 Flanders)	6
Belgium (Ultratop 50 Wallonia)	12
Bolivia (Monitor Latino)	6
Brazil (Top 100 Brasil)	65
Canada Hot 100 (Billboard)	1
Canada CHR/Top 40 (Billboard)	2
Canada Hot AC (Billboard)	23
Colombia (National-Report)	22
Czech Republic Singles Digital (ČNS IFPI)	5
Denmark (Tracklisten)	1
Finland (Suomen virallinen lista)	3
France (SNEP)	3
Germany (GfK)	4
Greece (IFPI)	1
Hungary (Dance Top 40)	31
Hungary (Single Top 40)	2
Hungary (Stream Top 40)	2
Ireland (IRMA)	2
Italy (FIMI)	5
Japan Hot 100 (Billboard)	46
Lebanon (OLT20)	1
Malaysia (RIM)	1
Mexico Airplay (Billboard)	2
Mexico Streaming (AMPROFON)	2
Netherlands (Dutch Top 40)	1
Netherlands (Single Top 100)	2
New Zealand (Recorded Music NZ)	1
Norway (VG-lista)	3
Panama (Monitor Latino)	6
Portugal (AFP)	1
Romania (Airplay 100)	19
Scottish Singles Sales (Official Charts)	2
Singapore (RIAS)	1
Slovakia Singles Digital (ČNS IFPI)	1
South Korea International (Gaon)	25
Spain (Promusicae)	8
Sweden (Sverigetopplistan)	1
Switzerland (Schweizer Hitparade)	2
UK Singles (Official Charts)	1
UK Hip Hop/R&B (Official Charts)	1
US Billboard Hot 100	1
US Dance Club Songs (Billboard)	21
US Hot R&B/Hip-Hop Songs (Billboard)	1
US Pop Airplay (Billboard)	6
US Rhythmic Airplay (Billboard)	1

=== Monthly charts ===
Chart (2018)	Peak position
Brazil Streaming (Pro-Música)	8

=== Year-end charts ===
Chart (2018)	Position
Australia (ARIA)	16
Austria (Ö3 Austria Top 40)	60
Belgium (Ultratop Flanders)	60
Canada (Canadian Hot 100)	11
Denmark (Tracklisten)	35
France (SNEP)	81
Estonia (IFPI)	27
Germany (Official German Charts)	58
Hungary (Dance Top 40)	89
Hungary (Single Top 40)	43
Iceland (Plötutíóindi)	85
Ireland (IRMA)	36
Italy (FIMI)	52
Netherlands (Dutch Top 40)	46
Netherlands (Single Top 100)	33
New Zealand (Recorded Music NZ)	27
Panama (Monitor Latino)	96
Portugal (AFP)	10
Romania (Airplay 100)	93
Spain (PROMUSICAE)	98
Sweden (Sverigetopplistan)	30
Switzerland (Schweizer Hitparade)	48
UK Singles (Official Charts Company)	15
US Billboard Hot 100	9
US Hot R&B/Hip-Hop Songs (Billboard)	3
US Mainstream Top 40 (Billboard)	35
US Rhythmic (Billboard)	15

Chart (2019)	Position
Canada (Canadian Hot 100)	69
Portugal (AFP)	181

=== Decade-end charts ===
Chart (2010–2019)	Position
US Billboard Hot 100	98
US Hot R&B/Hip-Hop Songs (Billboard)	47

== Certifications ==
Region	Certification	Certified units/sales
Australia (ARIA)	7× Platinum	490,000^{‡}
Belgium (BRMA)	Platinum	40,000^{‡}
Brazil (Pro-Música Brasil)	2× Diamond	320,000^{‡}
Canada (Music Canada)	5× Platinum	400,000^{‡}
Denmark (IFPI Danmark)	Platinum	90,000^{‡}
France (SNEP)	Diamond	333,333^{‡}
Germany (BVMI)	Gold	200,000^{‡}
Italy (FIMI)	2× Platinum	100,000^{‡}
Mexico (AMPROFON)	Platinum	60,000^{‡}
New Zealand (RMNZ)	Platinum	30,000^{‡}
Poland (ZPAV)	Platinum	50,000^{‡}
Portugal (AFP)	2× Platinum	20,000^{‡}
Spain (Promusicae)	Platinum	40,000^{‡}
United Kingdom (BPI)	3× Platinum	1,800,000^{‡}
United States (RIAA)	Diamond	10,000,000^{‡}
Streaming
Sweden (GLF)	Platinum	8,000,000^{†}
^{‡} Sales+streaming figures based on certification alone.^{†} Streaming-only figures based on certification alone.

== Release history ==
Country	Date	Format	Label(s)	Ref.
United States	July 10, 2018	Rhythmic contemporary	Young Money; Cash Money; Republic	
United States	July 10, 2018	Contemporary hit radio	Young Money; Cash Money; Republic	
United Kingdom	July 27, 2018	Contemporary hit radio	Young Money; Cash Money; Republic	
Italy	August 24, 2018	Contemporary hit radio	Universal	

== See also ==
- List of number-one singles of 2018 (Australia)
- List of number-one digital tracks of 2018 (Australia)
- List of number-one urban singles of 2018 (Australia)
- List of Canadian Hot 100 number-one singles of 2018
- List of number-one hits of 2018 (Denmark)
- List of number-one songs of 2018 (Lebanon)
- List of number-one songs of 2018 (Malaysia)
- List of Dutch Top 40 number-one singles of 2018
- List of number-one singles from the 2010s (New Zealand)
- List of number-one singles of 2018 (Portugal)
- List of number-one songs of 2018 (Singapore)
- List of number-one singles of the 2010s (Sweden)
- List of UK Singles Chart number ones of the 2010s
- List of UK R&B Singles Chart number ones of 2018
- List of Billboard Hot 100 number-one singles of 2018
- List of Billboard Rhythmic number-one songs of the 2010s
- List of number-one Billboard Streaming Songs of 2018
- List of number-one digital songs of 2018 (U.S.)
- List of number-one R&B/hip-hop songs of 2018 (U.S.)
