= Reverence (Parkway Drive album) =

Studio album by Parkway Drive
- Released: 4 May 2018
- Studios: The Warehouse Studio, Vancouver, British Columbia, Canada; All Buttons In Studios, Ottawa, Ontario
- Genre: Heavy metal
- Length: 42:45
- Labels: Resist; Epitaph
- Producer: George Hadji-Christou

Parkway Drive chronology
Ire (2015)	Reverence (2018)	Darker Still (2022)

Singles from Reverence
- 1. "Wishing Wells" Released: 27 February 2018; 2. "The Void" Released: 13 March 2018; 3. "Prey" Released: 24 April 2018; 4. "Shadow Boxing" Released: 21 January 2019

Reverence is the sixth studio album by Australian metalcore band Parkway Drive. It was released on 4 May 2018 through Resist and Epitaph Records. The album was produced by George Hadji-Christou. Critics noted that the album marked a step towards a more melodic, accessible heavy metal sound, with more prominent use of clean singing while the songs tackle themes such as religion and death. The album won the 2018 ARIA Award for Best Hard Rock/Heavy Metal Album, the band's second win in the category, the first being Deep Blue.

The cover of the album depicts a restored version of the monumental religious oil painting by Peter Paul Rubens, titled The Fall of the Damned.

== Background and promotion ==
In May 2017, the band announced that they were working on a new album. Vocalist Winston McCall said the album would be "more aggressive" than its predecessor Ire. The album had been expected to be released sometime in 2018. On 27 February 2018, the band released "Wishing Wells", which is the first single from the album, whose title had not been yet announced. On 13 March, the band announced that the album's title and release date. The second single entitled "The Void" was released alongside this announcement.

The third single, "Prey", was released on 24 April. Following the release of the album, the band announced the North American tour with August Burns Red and The Devil Wears Prada beginning on 30 August from San Diego, California and ending on 23 September in Hollywood.

== Critical reception ==
Professional ratings
Review scores
Source	Rating
AllMusic	4.5/5 stars
Already Heard	5/5 stars
Classic Rock	4/5 stars
Dead Press!	9/10
Distorted Sound	9/10
The Guardian	4/5 stars
Louder Sound	4/5 stars
NME	4/5 stars
Rock Sins	10/10
Wall of Sound	10/10

The album received generally positive reviews from music critics. AllMusic described the album as a "powerful statement of intent and a hugely cinematic amalgam of heavy metal subgenres", with the band delivering "its most crucial outing to date, one that's both devastating and galvanizing." The review also noted the prominent influence of Iron Maiden and Judas Priest on the album's more melodic musical style, and compared Reverence to Metallica's Black Album. Already Heard rated the album 5 out of 5 and said: "Reverence could have broken Parkway Drive and torn their mantra to shreds. The physical and mental pain that builds up these tracks' foundations could've left them exasperated and drained, but they've persevered and turned despair into the finest album of their career. These songs are anthems of struggle, loss, and retribution, destined to turn Parkway into every festival's confirmed headliner."

Distorted Sound scored the album 9 out of 10 and said: "The fervour on social media around Reverence has certainly been more divisive than before, and it would not be a surprise to see some of those that have followed Parkway Drive from the very beginning to turn their backs on the Australians, but the army of followers who will join in support will far outnumber the deserters. The biggest band from Down Under since AC/DC are at the very top of their game and are only going to get better." NME likewise praised the album for its more melodic approach, singling out singer Winston McCall's vocal performance for particular praise, and concluded that "Reverence is a record for arenas, and Parkway Drive have finally – and perhaps unexpectedly – become the modern metal band who deserve to fill them."

Simon Crampton of Rock Sins rated the album 10 out of 10 and said: "This is everything Parkway Drive have always threatened to be and a very big sign of everything they are about to become. This is the album that puts them into arenas and into the history books as one of the greatest bands of their generation." Wall of Sound gave the album a perfect score 10/10 and saying: "Well, that was Reverence and holy fuck what an experience it was. Parkway Drive are no longer the boys from the Byron Bay Hardcore scene, they're now the men taking on the worldwide Heavy Music industry and proving they're here to stay. It's so hard to fault this album when you think about everything they've produced. It's raw, heavy, soothing, calm and hectic in so many ways and styles. They've risked tackling something they haven't done before and completely blown expectations out of the water. This isn't a new album of churn and burn music, this is a fucking strategically orchestrated masterpiece that'll be played for years to come and hopefully several songs from it will become staple go-to future classics in years to come."

== Track listing ==
All tracks are written by Winston McCall, Jeff Ling, Luke Kilpatrick, and Benjamin Gordon, except where noted; credited to Parkway Drive.

No.	Title	Length
1.	"Wishing Wells"	5:04
2.	"Prey"	4:15
3.	"Absolute Power"	3:43
4.	"Cemetery Bloom"	3:10
5.	"The Void"	3:53
6.	"I Hope You Rot"	4:50
7.	"Shadow Boxing"	3:50
8.	"In Blood"	4:20
9.	"Chronos"	6:20
10.	"The Colour of Leaving"	3:19
Total length:		42:45

== Personnel ==
Parkway Drive

- Winston McCall – lead vocals
- Jeff Ling – lead guitar
- Luke "Pig" Kilpatrick – rhythm guitar
- Jia "Pie" O'Connor – bass
- Ben "Gaz" Gordon – drums

Additional musicians

- Chady Awad – backing vocals
- Greg Weeks – string compositions and arrangements, cello
- Yolanda Bruno – violin

Additional personnel

- George Hadji-Christou – production, string compositions and arrangements, piano
- Dean Hadji-Christou – engineering
- Ryan Enockson – assistant engineering
- Josh Wilbur – mixing
- Ted Jensen – mastering
- Anthony Kalabretta – synthesizer programming
- Peter Paul Rubens – cover painting
- Frans Floris de Vriendt – paintings
- Donny Phillips – audio manipulation, illustrations, package design

== Charts ==
=== Weekly charts ===
Chart (2018)	Peak position
Australian Albums (ARIA)	1
Austrian Albums (Ö3 Austria)	6
Belgian Albums (Ultratop Flanders)	5
Belgian Albums (Ultratop Wallonia)	37
Canadian Albums (Billboard)	68
Dutch Albums (Album Top 100)	81
Finnish Albums (Suomen virallinen lista)	41
German Albums (Offizielle Top 100)	3
Hungarian Albums (MAHASZ)	38
New Zealand Albums (RMNZ)	34
Scottish Albums (Official Charts)	11
Swedish Albums (Sverigetopplistan)	42
Swiss Albums (Schweizer Hitparade)	3
UK Albums (Official Charts)	14
UK Rock & Metal Albums (Official Charts)	2
US Billboard 200	35
US Top Hard Rock Albums (Billboard)	2
US Top Rock Albums (Billboard)	4

=== Year-end charts ===
Chart (2018)	Position
Australian Albums (ARIA)	72
Belgian Albums (Ultratop Flanders)	149

== Certifications ==
Region	Certification	Certified units/sales
Australia (ARIA)	Gold	35,000^{‡}
^{‡} Sales+streaming figures based on certification alone.
