= List of number-one digital albums of 2016 (Australia) =

ARIA Charts number-one digital albums of 2016 < 2015 2017 >

Other Australian number-one charts of 2016
- albums
- singles
- urban singles
- dance singles
- club tracks
- digital tracks
- streaming tracks

Top Australian singles and albums of 2016
- Triple J Hottest 100
- top 25 singles
- top 25 albums

The ARIA Digital Album Chart ranks the best-performing albums and extended plays (EPs) in Australia. Its data, published by the Australian Recording Industry Association, is based collectively on the weekly digital sales of albums and EPs.

== Chart history ==
Date	Album	Artist(s)	Ref.
4 January	25	Adele	
11 January	25	Adele	
18 January	Blackstar	David Bowie	
25 January	25	Adele	
1 February	Bloom	Rüfüs	
8 February	This Is Acting	Sia	
15 February	Molly: Do Yourself a Favour	Various Artists	
22 February	Molly: Do Yourself a Favour	Various Artists	
29 February	Drinking from the Sun, Walking Under Stars Restrung	Hilltop Hoods	
7 March	I Like It When You Sleep, for You Are So Beautiful yet So Unaware of It	The 1975	
14 March	Untitled Unmastered	Kendrick Lamar	
21 March	Telluric	Matt Corby	
28 March	Waco	Violent Soho	
4 April	Mind of Mine	Zayn	
11 April	Lukas Graham	Lukas Graham	
18 April	Cleopatra	The Lumineers	
25 April	Bloom	Rüfüs	
2 May	Lemonade	Beyoncé	
9 May	Views	Drake	
16 May	A Moon Shaped Pool	Radiohead	
23 May	Lemonade	Beyoncé	
30 May	Dangerous Woman	Ariana Grande	
6 June	Skin	Flume	
13 June	Skin	Flume	
20 June	Thick as Thieves	The Temper Trap	
27 June	The Getaway	Red Hot Chili Peppers	
4 July	Conscious	Broods	
11 July	California	Blink-182	
18 July	Wildflower	The Avalanches	
25 July	Youth Authority	Good Charlotte	
1 August	Skin	Flume	
8 August	Let Me Be Clear	Gang of Youths	
15 August	Suicide Squad: The Album	Various Artists	
22 August	This Could Be Heartbreak	Amity Affliction	
29 August	Blonde	Frank Ocean	
5 September	Blonde	Frank Ocean	
12 September	Bad Vibrations	A Day to Remember	
19 September	Internal	Safia	
26 September	Suicide Squad: The Album	Various Artists	
3 October	Young as the Morning, Old as the Sea	Passenger	
10 October	Westway (The Glitter & the Slums)	Sticky Fingers	
17 October	Triple J's Like a Version Volume 12	Various Artists	
24 October	Let There Be Light	Hillsong Worship	
31 October	Joanne	Lady Gaga	
7 November	Back from the Edge	James Arthur	
14 November	Brace	Birds of Tokyo	
21 November	Two Degrees	Illy	
28 November	Hardwired... to Self-Destruct	Metallica	
5 December	Starboy	The Weeknd	
12 December	Blue & Lonesome	The Rolling Stones	
19 December	4 Your Eyez Only	J. Cole	
26 December	Christmas	Michael Bublé	

== Number-one artists ==
Position	Artist	Weeks at No. 1
1	Adele	3
1	Flume	3
2	Beyoncé	2
2	Frank Ocean	2
2	Rüfüs	2
3	The 1975	1
3	Amity Affliction	1
3	Ariana Grande	1
3	The Avalanches	1
3	Bink-182	1
3	Broods	1
3	A Day to Remember	1
3	Birds of Tokyo	1
3	David Bowie	1
3	Drake	1
3	Gang of Youths	1
3	Good Charlotte	1
3	The Hillsong Worship	1
3	The Hilltop Hoods	1
3	Illy	1
3	J. Cole	1
3	James Arthur	1
3	Kendrick Lamar	1
3	Lady Gaga	1
3	Lukas Graham	1
3	The Lumineers	1
3	Matt Corby	1
3	Metallica	1
3	Michael Bublé	1
3	Passenger	1
3	Radiohead	1
3	Red Hot Chili Peppers	1
3	The Rolling Stones	1
3	Safia	1
3	Sia	1
3	Sticky Fingers	1
3	The Temper Trap	1
3	Violent Soho	1
3	The Weeknd	1
3	Zayn	1

== See also ==
- 2016 in music
- ARIA Charts
- List of number-one singles of 2016 (Australia)
