= List of number-one urban albums of 2016 (Australia) =

ARIA Charts number-one urban albums of 2016 < 2015 2017 >

Other Australian number-one charts of 2016
- albums
- singles
- urban singles
- dance singles
- club tracks
- digital tracks
- streaming tracks

Top Australian singles and albums of 2016
- Triple J Hottest 100
- top 25 singles
- top 25 albums

This is a list of albums that reached number-one on the ARIA Urban Albums Chart in 2016. The ARIA Urban Albums Chart is a weekly chart that ranks the best-performing urban albums in Australia. It is published by the Australian Recording Industry Association (ARIA), an organisation that collects music data for the weekly ARIA Charts. To be eligible to appear on the chart, the recording must be an album of a predominantly urban nature.

== Chart history ==
Issue date	Album	Artist(s)	Reference
4 January	RnB Fridays	Various Artists	
11 January	RnB Fridays	Various Artists	
18 January	RnB Fridays	Various Artists	
25 January	RnB Fridays	Various Artists	
1 February	RnB Fridays	Various Artists	
8 February	RnB Fridays	Various Artists	
15 February	RnB Fridays	Various Artists	
22 February	RnB Fridays	Various Artists	
29 February	Drinking from the Sun, Walking Under Stars Restrung	Hilltop Hoods	
7 March	Drinking from the Sun, Walking Under Stars Restrung	Hilltop Hoods	
14 March	Untitled Unmastered	Kendrick Lamar	
21 March	Drinking from the Sun, Walking Under Stars Restrung	Hilltop Hoods	
28 March	Drinking from the Sun, Walking Under Stars Restrung	Hilltop Hoods	
4 April	Mind of Mine	Zayn	
11 April	Mind of Mine	Zayn	
18 April	Drinking from the Sun, Walking Under Stars Restrung	Hilltop Hoods	
25 April	Drinking from the Sun, Walking Under Stars Restrung	Hilltop Hoods	
2 May	Lemonade	Beyoncé	
9 May	Views	Drake	
16 May	Lemonade	Beyoncé	
23 May	Lemonade	Beyoncé	
30 May	Lemonade	Beyoncé	
6 June	Lemonade	Beyoncé	
13 June	Lemonade	Beyoncé	
20 June	Lemonade	Beyoncé	
27 June	RnB Fridays Volume 2	Various Artists	
4 July	Lemonade	Beyoncé	
11 July	Lemonade	Beyoncé	
18 July	RnB Fridays Volume 2	Various Artists	
25 July	RnB Fridays Volume 2	Various Artists	
1 August	RnB Fridays Volume 2	Various Artists	
8 August	RnB Fridays Volume 2	Various Artists	
15 August	RnB Fridays Volume 2	Various Artists	
22 August	RnB Fridays Volume 2	Various Artists	
29 August	Blonde	Frank Ocean	
5 September	Blonde	Frank Ocean	
12 September	Blonde	Frank Ocean	
19 September	RnB Fridays Volume 2	Various Artists	
26 September	Hard II Love	Usher	
3 October	RnB Fridays Volume 2	Various Artists	
10 October	RnB Fridays Volume 2	Various Artists	
17 October	RnB Fridays Volume 2	Various Artists	
24 October	1992	The Game	
31 October	RnB Fridays Volume 2	Various Artists	
7 November	RnB Fridays Volume 2	Various Artists	
14 November	Don't Look Down	Pez	
21 November	Two Degrees	Illy	
28 November	Tradition	Kerser	
5 December	Starboy	The Weeknd	
12 December	Starboy	The Weeknd	
19 December	4 Your Eyez Only	J. Cole	
26 December	Starboy	The Weeknd	

== See also ==
- 2016 in music
- List of number-one albums of 2016 (Australia)
