= List of number-one country albums of 2016 (Australia) =

ARIA Charts number-one country albums of 2016 < 2015 2017 >

Other Australian number-one charts of 2016
- albums
- singles
- urban singles
- dance singles
- club tracks
- digital tracks
- streaming tracks

Top Australian singles and albums of 2016
- Triple J Hottest 100
- top 25 singles
- top 25 albums

These are the Australian Country number-one albums of 2016, per the ARIA Charts.

Issue date	Album	Artist
4 January	Speak Now	Taylor Swift
11 January	Harvey's Bar... The Backyard Sessions	Adam Harvey
18 January	Adam Brand and the Outlaws	Adam Brand and the Outlaws
25 January	Brothers Never Part	Brothers3
1 February	Adam Brand and the Outlaws	Adam Brand and the Outlaws
8 February	Adam Brand and the Outlaws	Adam Brand and the Outlaws
15 February	Adam Brand and the Outlaws	Adam Brand and the Outlaws
22 February	Adam Brand and the Outlaws	Adam Brand and the Outlaws
29 February	Adam Brand and the Outlaws	Adam Brand and the Outlaws
7 March	Ignite the Night	Chase Rice
14 March	So Country 2016	Various artists
21 March	So Country 2016	Various artists
28 March	So Country 2016	Various artists
4 April	So Country 2016	Various artists
11 April	So Country 2016	Various artists
18 April	So Country 2016	Various artists
25 April	So Country 2016	Various artists
2 May	Looking for a Story	John Williamson
9 May	60 Summers	Graeme Connors
16 May	Ripcord	Keith Urban
23 May	Ripcord	Keith Urban
30 May	Ripcord	Keith Urban
6 June	Ripcord	Keith Urban
13 June	Ripcord	Keith Urban
20 June	Ripcord	Keith Urban
27 June	Ripcord	Keith Urban
4 July	Ripcord	Keith Urban
11 July	Ripcord	Keith Urban
18 July	Ripcord	Keith Urban
25 July	Ripcord	Keith Urban
1 August	Ripcord	Keith Urban
8 August	Ripcord	Keith Urban
15 August	Ripcord	Keith Urban
22 August	Ripcord	Keith Urban
29 August	Pure & Simple	Dolly Parton
5 September	Things I Carry Around	Troy Cassar-Daley
12 September	His Favourite Collection	John Williamson
19 September	The Complete Trio Collection	Dolly Parton, Linda Ronstadt and Emmylou Harris
26 September	The Complete Trio Collection	Dolly Parton, Linda Ronstadt and Emmylou Harris
3 October	The Complete Trio Collection	Dolly Parton, Linda Ronstadt and Emmylou Harris
10 October	Ripcord	Keith Urban
17 October	Ripcord	Keith Urban
24 October	Ripcord	Keith Urban
31 October	Ripcord	Keith Urban
7 November	Ripcord	Keith Urban
14 November	Ripcord	Keith Urban
21 November	Ripcord	Keith Urban
28 November	Ripcord	Keith Urban
5 December	Gunslinger	Garth Brooks
12 December	Ripcord	Keith Urban
19 December	Ripcord	Keith Urban
26 December	Ripcord	Keith Urban

== See also ==
- 2016 in music
- List of number-one albums of 2016 (Australia)
