= List of top 10 singles for 2016 in Australia =

This is a list of singles that charted in the top ten of the ARIA Charts in 2016. In 2016, forty-six acts reached the top ten for the first time. Justin Bieber had the most top-ten singles in 2016 with five, while The Chainsmokers had four.

== Top-ten singles ==
Key

Symbol	Meaning
◁	Indicates single's top 10 entry was also its ARIA top 50 debut
(#)	2016 Year-end top 10 single position and rank

List of ARIA top ten singles that peaked in 2016
Top ten entry date	Single	Artist(s)	Peak	Peak date	Weeks in top ten	References
Singles from 2015
28 December	"Fast Car" ◁	Jonas Blue featuring Dakota	1	1 February	9	
Singles from 2016
4 January	"All My Friends"	Snakehips featuring Tinashe and Chance the Rapper	3	18 January	7	
11 January	"Ex's & Oh's"	Elle King	5	25 January	4	
18 January	"Lush Life"	Zara Larsson	4	25 January	5	
25 January	"Never Be like You" (#4) ◁	Flume featuring Kai	1	15 February	10	
1 February	"One Call Away"	Charlie Puth	3	8 February	10	
1 February	"Hoops"	The Rubens	9	8 February	2	
8 February	"Pillowtalk" ◁	Zayn	1	8 February	5	
8 February	"Gold"	Kiiara	5	15 February	6	
8 February	"Work" ◁	Rihanna featuring Drake	5	7 March	3	
14 February	"Stressed Out" (#9)	Twenty One Pilots	2	14 March	9	
14 February	"Roses"	The Chainsmokers featuring Rozes	5	29 February	4	
22 February	"7 Years" (#3)	Lukas Graham	1	22 February	12	
22 February	"My House"	Flo Rida	6	7 March	7	
22 February	"1955"	Hilltop Hoods featuring Montaigne and Tom Thum	2	7 March	8	
14 March	"Hide Away"	Daya	6	28 March	4	
14 March	"Cheap Thrills" (#8)	Sia	6	4 April	5	
21 March	"Faded"	Alan Walker	2	21 March	6	
21 March	"Work from Home"	Fifth Harmony featuring Ty Dolla Sign	3	28 March	8	
28 March	"Dance Off"	Macklemore & Ryan Lewis featuring Anderson .Paak	7	28 March	1	
4 April	"I Took a Pill in Ibiza"	Mike Posner	5	4 April	7	
11 April	"The Sound of Silence"	Disturbed	4	11 April	3	
11 April	"I Hate U, I Love U"	Gnash featuring Olivia O'Brien	1	18 April	8	
11 April	"Don't Let Me Down" (#5)	The Chainsmokers featuring Daya	3	18 April	15	
11 April	"No"	Meghan Trainor	9	11 April	2	
25 April	"Just Like Fire" ◁	Pink	1	2 May	11	
25 April	"Be the One"	Dua Lipa	6	2 May	4	
25 April	"One Dance" (#2)	Drake featuring Wizkid and Kyla	1	9 May	17	
2 May	"Purple Rain" ◁	Prince and The Revolution	3	2 May	1	
2 May	"Say It" ◁	Flume featuring Tove Lo	5	6 June	9	
9 May	"This Is What You Came For" (#6) ◁	Calvin Harris featuring Rihanna	1	6 June	16	
16 May	"Dear Life" ◁	Delta Goodrem	3	16 May	1	
16 May	"Can't Stop the Feeling!" (#7) ◁	Justin Timberlake	3	23 May	14	
23 May	"Sound of Silence" ◁	Dami Im	5	23 May	1	
23 May	"No Money"	Galantis	6	23 May	4	
23 May	"Panda"	Desiigner	7	27 June	8	
30 May	"Cake by the Ocean"	DNCE	6	6 June	5	
6 June	"Me Too"	Meghan Trainor	4	20 June	7	
20 June	"Too Good"	Drake featuring Rihanna	3	27 June	8	
4 July	"In My Blood"	The Veronicas	1	11 July	5	
4 July	"Treat You Better"	Shawn Mendes	4	18 July	9	
10 July	"Don't Be So Shy"	Imany	9	10 July	4	
18 July	"We Don't Talk Anymore"	Charlie Puth featuring Selena Gomez	10	18 July	1	
25 July	"Rise" ◁	Katy Perry	1	25 July	1	
25 July	"Papercuts"	Illy featuring Vera Blue	2	1 August	10	
25 July	"Hair"	Little Mix featuring Sean Paul	10	25 July	1	
1 August	"Cold Water" ◁	Major Lazer featuring Justin Bieber and MØ	1	1 August	10	
1 August	"Alarm"	Anne-Marie	7	8 August	5	
8 August	"Closer" (#1) ◁	The Chainsmokers featuring Halsey	1	15 August	23	
8 August	"Crash"	Usher	10	8 August	1	
15 August	"Let Me Love You" ◁	DJ Snake featuring Justin Bieber	2	22 August	11	
15 August	"Heathens"	Twenty One Pilots	3	5 September	8	
15 August	"Perfect Strangers"	Jonas Blue featuring JP Cooper	6	22 August	4	
22 August	"I Love You Always Forever" ◁	Betty Who	6	29 August	3	
29 August	"Sucker for Pain"	Lil Wayne, Wiz Khalifa and Imagine Dragons featuring Logic, Ty Dolla Sign and X Ambassadors	7	5 September	5	
5 September	"In The Name of Love"	Martin Garrix and Bebe Rexha	8	5 September	2	
5 September	"Dancing on My Own"	Calum Scott	2	26 September	15	
12 September	"Side to Side"	Ariana Grande featuring Nicki Minaj	3	26 September	9	
12 September	"Starving"	Hailee Steinfeld and Grey featuring Zedd	5	26 September	10	
19 September	"The Greatest"	Sia featuring Kendrick Lamar	2	19 September	8	
3 October	"Say You Won't Let Go"	James Arthur	1	17 October	15	
3 October	"Starboy" ◁	The Weeknd featuring Daft Punk	2	17 October	18	
10 October	"This Town" ◁	Niall Horan	5	10 October	1	
10 October	"My Way"	Calvin Harris	9	17 October	2	
17 October	"All We Know"	The Chainsmokers featuring Phoebe Ryan	8	24 October	3	
24 October	"24K Magic"	Bruno Mars	3	26 December	13	
31 October	"Shout Out to My Ex"	Little Mix	4	31 October	6	
7 November	"Don't Wanna Know"	Maroon 5 featuring Kendrick Lamar	6	14 November	6	
14 November	"Sexual"	Neiked featuring Dyo	4	21 November	8	
14 November	"The Mack"	Nevada featuring Mark Morrison and Fetty Wap	9	14 November	2	
21 November	"Black Beatles"	Rae Sremmurd featuring Gucci Mane	3	28 November	7	
28 November	"Rockabye"	Clean Bandit featuring Sean Paul and Anne-Marie	1	5 December	13	
19 December	"I Don't Wanna Live Forever" ◁	Zayn and Taylor Swift	3	19 December	12	
19 December	"Scars to Your Beautiful"	Alessia Cara	8	19 December	2	

=== 2015 peaks ===
List of ARIA top ten singles in 2016 that peaked in 2015
Top ten entry date	Single	Artist(s)	Peak	Peak date	Weeks in top ten	References
7 September	"What Do You Mean?" ◁	Justin Bieber	1	7 September	19	
2 November	"Hello" ◁	Adele	1	2 November	13	
2 November	"Sorry" ◁	Justin Bieber	2	2 November	14	
2 November	"Never Forget You"	Zara Larsson and MNEK	3	16 November	10	
23 November	"Love Yourself" (#10) ◁	Justin Bieber	1	14 December	14	
23 November	"Stitches"	Shawn Mendes	4	7 December	10	
14 December	"Middle"	DJ Snake featuring Bipolar Sunshine	5	21 December	8	
28 December	"In2"	WSTRN	10	28 December	4	

=== 2017 peaks ===
List of ARIA top ten singles in 2016 that peaked in 2017
Top ten entry date	Single	Artist(s)	Peak	Peak date	Weeks in top ten	References
12 December	"Stranger"	Peking Duk featuring Elliphant	5	9 January	6	

== Entries by artist ==
The following table shows artists who achieved two or more top 10 entries in 2016, including songs that reached their peak in 2015 and 2017. The figures include both main artists and featured artists. The total number of weeks an artist spent in the top ten in 2016 is also shown.

Entries	Artist	Weeks	Songs
5	Justin Bieber	21	"Cold Water", "Let Me Love You", "Love Yourself", "Sorry", "What Do You Mean?"
4	The Chainsmokers	40	"All We Know", "Closer", "Don't Let Me Down", "Roses"
3	Drake	20	"One Dance", "Too Good", "Work"
3	Rihanna	19	"This Is What You Came For", "Too Good", "Work"
2	Anne-Marie	10	"Alarm", "Rockabye"
2	Calvin Harris	18	"My Way", "This Is What You Came For"
2	Charlie Puth	11	"One Call Away", "We Don't Talk Anymore"
2	Daya	19	"Don't Let Me Down", "Hide Away"
2	DJ Snake	16	"Let Me Love You", "Middle"
2	Flume	19	"Never Be Like You", "Say It"
2	Jonas Blue	12	"Fast Car", "Perfect Strangers"
2	Kendrick Lamar	13	"Don't Wanna Know", "The Greatest"
2	Little Mix	7	"Hair", "Shout Out to My Ex"
2	Meghan Trainor	9	"Me Too", "No"
2	Sean Paul	6	"Hair", "Rockabye"
2	Shawn Mendes	13	"Stitches", "Treat You Better"
2	Sia	13	"Cheap Thrills", "The Greatest"
2	Twenty One Pilots	17	"Heathens", "Stressed Out"
2	Ty Dolla Sign	13	"Sucker for Pain", "Work from Home"
2	Zara Larsson	6	"Lush Life", "Never Forget You"
2	Zayn	7	"I Don't Wanna Live Forever", "Pillowtalk"

== See also ==
- 2016 in music
- ARIA Charts
- List of number-one singles of 2016 (Australia)
- List of top 25 singles for 2016 in Australia
