= Like an Animal (Rüfüs song) =

Single by Rüfüs

from the album Bloom
- Released: 25 September 2015
- Length: 4:01
- Label: Sweat It Out!
- Songwriters: Jon George; Tyrone Lindqvist; James Hunt
- Producers: Jon George; Tyrone Lindqvist; James Hunt

Rüfüs singles chronology
"You Were Right" (2015)	"Like an Animal" (2015)	"Innerbloom" (2015)

"Like an Animal" is a song by Australian alternative dance group Rüfüs. The song was released on 25 September 2015 as the second single from the group's second studio album, Bloom (2016). The song peaked at number 44 on the ARIA Chart. The song was certified platinum in Australia in 2017.

== Reception ==
Ryan Middleton from Music Times said "The melodic indie-pop tune it brought together with a steady percussion, soft pads and airy keys for another piece of synth-pop gold from RÜFÜS".

In a review of Bloom Marcus Teague from The Guardian said ""Like an Animal" ripples with plastic guitars and stuttering hi-hats, evoking both the promise of early evening hedonism and the best of Van She."

Jacob Robinson from Daily Review, in a review of the album Bloom, said ""Like an Animal" is a glossy and pulsating EDM pop tune with a gigantic drop that descends into a hectic dance breakdown."

== Music video ==
The music video was directed by Katzki and released on 22 September 2015.

== Track listing ==
Digital single
No.	Title	Length
1.	"Like an Animal" (album version)	4:01

Digital single (Remixes)
No.	Title	Length
1.	"Like an Animal" (Dom Dolla remix)	5:21
2.	"Like an Animal" (Isaac Tichauer remix)	7:28
3.	"Like an Animal" (Trinidad remix)	7:12

Digital single (Remixes Part 2)
No.	Title	Length
1.	"Like an Animal" (Yotto remix)	7:03
2.	"Like an Animal" (LCAW remix)	4:37

== Charts ==
Chart (2015/16)	Peak position
Australia (ARIA)	44
Australian Independent (AIR)	4

== Certifications ==
Region	Certification	Certified units/sales
Australia (ARIA)	3× Platinum	210,000^{‡}
New Zealand (RMNZ)	Platinum	30,000^{‡}
^{‡} Sales+streaming figures based on certification alone.

== Release history ==
Country	Version	Date	Format	Label	Catalogue
Australia	Single	25 September 2015	Digital download, streaming	Sweat It Out!	SWEATDS183DJ
Australia	Remixes	6 November 2015	Digital download, streaming	Sweat It Out!	SWEATDS183RDJ2
Australia	Remixes Part 2	19 January 2016	Digital download, streaming	Sweat It Out!	SWEATDS183DJ2
