= List of number-one digital tracks of 2016 (Australia) =

ARIA Charts number-one digital tracks of 2016 < 2015 2017 >

Other Australian number-one charts of 2016
- albums
- singles
- urban singles
- dance singles
- club tracks
- streaming tracks

Top Australian singles and albums of 2016
- Triple J Hottest 100
- top 25 singles
- top 25 albums

The ARIA Digital Track Chart is a chart that ranks the best-performing digital tracks singles of Australia. It is published by Australian Recording Industry Association (ARIA), an organisation who collect music data for the weekly ARIA Charts. To be eligible to appear on the chart, the recording must be a single not an EP and only paid downloads counted from downloadable outlets.

== Chart history ==
Key
†	Indicates number-one digital single of 2016

Issue date	Song	Artist(s)	Reference
4 January	"Love Yourself"	Justin Bieber	
11 January	"Love Yourself"	Justin Bieber	
18 January	"Love Yourself"	Justin Bieber	
25 January	"Fast Car"	Jonas Blue featuring Dakota	
1 February	"Fast Car"	Jonas Blue featuring Dakota	
8 February	"Pillowtalk"	Zayn Malik	
15 February	"Never Be Like You"	Flume featuring Kai	
22 February	"7 Years"†	Lukas Graham	
29 February	"7 Years"†	Lukas Graham	
7 March	"7 Years"†	Lukas Graham	
14 March	"7 Years"†	Lukas Graham	
21 March	"7 Years"†	Lukas Graham	
28 March	"7 Years"†	Lukas Graham	
4 April	"7 Years"†	Lukas Graham	
11 April	"I Hate U, I Love U"	Gnash featuring Olivia O'Brien	
18 April	"I Hate U, I Love U"	Gnash featuring Olivia O'Brien	
25 April	"Just Like Fire"	Pink	
2 May	"Just Like Fire"	Pink	
9 May	"This Is What You Came For"	Calvin Harris featuring Rihanna	
16 May	"This Is What You Came For"	Calvin Harris featuring Rihanna	
23 May	"This Is What You Came For"	Calvin Harris featuring Rihanna	
30 May	"Can't Stop the Feeling!"	Justin Timberlake	
6 June	"Just Like Fire"	Pink	
13 June	"This Is What You Came For"	Calvin Harris featuring Rihanna	
20 June	"Me Too"	Meghan Trainor	
27 June	"One Dance"	Drake featuring Wizkid and Kyla	
4 July	"In My Blood"	The Veronicas	
11 July	"In My Blood"	The Veronicas	
18 July	"In My Blood"	The Veronicas	
25 July	"Rise"	Katy Perry	
1 August	"Cold Water"	Major Lazer featuring Justin Bieber and MØ	
8 August	"Cold Water"	Major Lazer featuring Justin Bieber and MØ	
15 August	"Let Me Love You"	DJ Snake featuring Justin Bieber	
22 August	"Closer"	The Chainsmokers featuring Halsey	
29 August	"Closer"	The Chainsmokers featuring Halsey	
5 September	"Closer"	The Chainsmokers featuring Halsey	
12 September	"Closer"	The Chainsmokers featuring Halsey	
19 September	"Closer"	The Chainsmokers featuring Halsey	
26 September	"Closer"	The Chainsmokers featuring Halsey	
3 October	"Say You Won't Let Go"	James Arthur	
10 October	"Say You Won't Let Go"	James Arthur	
17 October	"Say You Won't Let Go"	James Arthur	
24 October	"Say You Won't Let Go"	James Arthur	
31 October	"Say You Won't Let Go"	James Arthur	
7 November	"Say You Won't Let Go"	James Arthur	
14 November	"Say You Won't Let Go"	James Arthur	
21 November	"Say You Won't Let Go"	James Arthur	
28 November	"Rockabye"	Clean Bandit featuring Sean Paul and Anne-Marie	
5 December	"Rockabye"	Clean Bandit featuring Sean Paul and Anne-Marie	
12 December	"Rockabye"	Clean Bandit featuring Sean Paul and Anne-Marie	
19 December	"I Don't Wanna Live Forever"	Zayn & Taylor Swift	
26 December	"Rockabye"	Clean Bandit featuring Sean Paul & Anne-Marie	

== Number-one artists ==
Position	Artist	Weeks at No. 1
1	James Arthur	8
2	Lukas Graham	7
3	The Chainsmokers	6
3	Halsey (as featuring)	6
4	Justin Bieber	5
5	Calvin Harris	4
5	Clean Bandit	4
5	Anne-Marie (as featuring)	4
5	Sean Paul (as featuring)	4
5	Rihanna (as featuring)	4
6	Pink	3
6	The Veronicas	3
7	Gnash	2
7	Olivia O'Brien (as featuring)	2
7	Jonas Blue	2
7	Dakota (as featuring)	2
7	Major Lazer	2
7	MØ	2
7	Zayn	2
8	DJ Snake	1
8	Flume	1
8	Kai (as featuring)	1
8	Drake	1
8	Wizkid (as featuring)	1
8	Kyla (as featuring)	1
8	Justin Timberlake	1
8	Katy Perry	1
8	Meghan Trainor	1
8	Taylor Swift	1

== See also ==
- 2016 in music
- ARIA Charts
- List of number-one singles of 2016 (Australia)
