= Innerbloom =

Single by Rüfüs

from the album Bloom
- Released: 20 November 2015
- Genre: Electronic; deep house; progressive house
- Length: 9:38
- Label: Sweat It Out!
- Songwriters: Jon George; Tyrone Lindqvist; James Hunt
- Producers: Jon George; Tyrone Lindqvist; James Hunt

Rüfüs singles chronology
"Like an Animal" (2015)	"Innerbloom" (2015)	"Say a Prayer for Me" (2016)

"Innerbloom" is a song by Australian alternative dance group Rüfüs Du Sol. The song was released on 20 November 2015 as the third single from the group's second studio album, Bloom (2016). The song peaked at number 65 on the ARIA Singles Chart. The song was certified platinum in Australia in 2017. The song listed at #5 in Triple J’s Hottest 100 of the Decade in March 2020, whilst the What So Not remix polled at #64.

RÜFÜS vocalist Tyrone Lindqvist said "I'm sure I'm not the first person to say this, but our favourite artists are our favourite because we've shared moments listening to them with friends or family that you can't recreate, moments you remember forever. We really wanted to create those moments for other people with the songs from Bloom. "Innerbloom" is probably the most personal song we've written in terms of where we are at as people."

== Reception ==
Sosefina Fuamoli from the AU Review labelled the song "a surefire hit", saying the song conjures a "blissful electronic atmosphere".

In a review of Bloom, Marcus Teague from the Guardian called the song the album's "high-water mark", writing that it's "a near-ten minute swim through woozy synths unspooling towards a perfectly weighted anthem of the interior."

At the 2017 Electronic Music Awards, the "Sasha remix" won "Record of the Year".

== Legacy ==
"Innerbloom" has had "a long-lasting impact on Australia's music culture" and is "indisputably" known as Rüfüs Du Sol's "magnum opus".

The song was voted number 16 in the Triple J Hottest 100 of Australian Songs.

== Music video ==
The music video was directed by Katzki and released on 26 October 2016. AAA Backstage called the video "mesmerising," and said, "The "Innerbloom" video is composed entirely of artistic microscope footage of different coloured paints being swirled together in soothing patterns. Resembling dreamy distant landscapes and far away galaxies, the visual effects paired with Innerbloom's sonic soundscape is uplifting, inspiring, and kind of therapeutic."

== Track listing ==
Digital single
No.	Title	Length
1.	"Innerbloom" (album version)	9:38

Digital single (What So Not remix)
No.	Title	Length
1.	"Innerbloom" (What So Not remix)	4:37

radio edit single
No.	Title	Length
1.	"Innerbloom" (radio edit)	3:58

Remixes single
No.	Title	Length
1.	"Innerbloom" (Lane 8 remix)	7:15
2.	"Innerbloom" (H.O.S.H. remix)	9:59
3.	"Innerbloom" (Andhim remix)	7:44
4.	"Innerbloom" (What So Not remix)	4:37
5.	"Innerbloom" (Parker + Barrow remix)	8:39

Digital single (Sasha remix)
No.	Title	Length
1.	"Innerbloom" (Sasha remix)	10:49

== Charts ==
Chart (2015–16)	Peak position
Australia (ARIA)	65
Australian Independent (AIR)	5

== Certifications ==
Region	Certification	Certified units/sales
Australia (ARIA)	3× Platinum	210,000^{‡}
Canada (Music Canada)	2× Platinum	160,000^{‡}
New Zealand (RMNZ)	3× Platinum	90,000^{‡}
United Kingdom (BPI)	Silver	200,000^{‡}
^{‡} Sales+streaming figures based on certification alone.

== Release history ==
Country	Version	Date	Format	Label	Catalogue
Australia	Single	20 November 2015	Digital download	Sweat It Out!	
Australia	What So Not single	18 March 2016	Digital download	Sweat It Out!	SWEATDS208DJ
Australia	Limited edition vinyl	16 April 2016	Vinyl	Sweat It Out!	SWEATA010V
Australia	Radio edit	30 September 2016	Digital download	Sweat It Out!	
Australia	Remixes	21 October 2016	Digital download	Sweat It Out!	SWEATDS242DJ
United Kingdom	Sasha remix	4 November 2016	Digital download	Last Night on Earth	LNOE061
