= You Were Right (Rüfüs song) =

2015 single by Rüfüs Du Sol

Single by Rüfüs Du Sol

from the album Bloom
- Released: 26 June 2015
- Length: 3:58
- Label: Sweat It Out!
- Songwriter(s): Jon George; Tyrone Lindqvist; James Hunt
- Producer(s): Jon George; Tyrone Lindqvist; James Hunt

Rüfüs Du Sol singles chronology
| "Sundream" (2014) | "You Were Right" (2015) | "Like an Animal" (2015) |

"You Were Right" is a song by Australian alternative dance group Rüfüs Du Sol. The song was released on 26 June 2015 as the lead single from the group's second studio album, Bloom (2016). The song peaked at number 22 on the ARIA Chart, becoming the group's first top 40 single. The song was certified 2× platinum in Australia in 2017.

At the 2015 Australian Independent Record Labels Association Awards, the song was nominated for Best Independent Dance/Electronica or Club Single.

At the ARIA Music Awards of 2015, the song won the ARIA Award for Best Dance Release.

== Reception ==
AAA Backstage said the song has a "hypnotizing beat with slightly faded melodies, accompanied by catchy and rhythmic claps and synths, not to mention warm vocals, which unconditionally stuck in your head."

Jacob Robinson from Daily Review, in a review of the album Bloom, said ""You Were Right" is a brilliant dance-floor filler and easily the best song on the album. It mixes the light grooves of sunny Sydney summers with the throbbing house build-ups of a chilly winter safe haven of a German club."

== Music video ==
The music video was directed by Katzki and released on 6 August 2015. Band member Jon George said "We worked with long time collaborator Katzki, who also happens to be my brother and has done every one of our videos. The video is about a feeling. It's the anticipation of a single moment and waiting for that moment of euphoria."

== Track listing ==
Digital single
| No. | Title | Length |
|---|---|---|
| 1. | "You Were Right" (single version) | 3:58 |

Digital single (DJ edit)
| No. | Title | Length |
|---|---|---|
| 1. | "You Were Right" (DJ edit) | 5:20 |

Digital single (Remixes)
| No. | Title | Length |
|---|---|---|
| 1. | "You Were Right remix" (Catz 'N Dogz) | 5:41 |
| 2. | "You Were Right" (Nora En Pure remix) | 5:34 |

Digital single (Remix pack 2)
| No. | Title | Length |
|---|---|---|
| 1. | "You Were Right" (Braxton remix) | 6:52 |

Digital single (Thomas Jack remix)
| No. | Title | Length |
|---|---|---|
| 1. | "You Were Right" (Thomas Jack remix) | 8:18 |

== Charts ==
| Chart (2015/16) | Peak position |
|---|---|
| Australia (ARIA) | 22 |
| Australian Independent (AIR) | 1 |

== Certifications ==
| Region | Certification | Certified units/sales |
|---|---|---|
| Australia (ARIA) | 6× Platinum | 420,000^{‡} |
| New Zealand (RMNZ) | 2× Platinum | 60,000^{‡} |
^{‡} Sales+streaming figures based on certification alone.

== Release history ==
| Country | Version | Date | Format | Label | Catalogue |
|---|---|---|---|---|---|
| Australia / New Zealand | Single edit | 26 June 2015 | Digital download, streaming | Sweat It Out! | SWEATDS183DJ |
| Australia | DJ Edit | 6 July 2015 | Digital download, streaming | Sweat It Out! | SWEATDS148DJ |
| Australia | Remixes | 14 August 2015 | Digital download, streaming | Sweat It Out! | SWEATDS163 |
| Australia | Remix Pack 2 | 4 September 2015 | Digital download, streaming | Sweat It Out! | SWEATDS182A |
| Australia | Thomas Jack remix | 18 September 2015 | Digital download, streaming | Sweat It Out! | G010003412977L |
