= Say a Prayer for Me =

Single by Rüfüs

from the album Bloom
- Released: 13 January 2016
- Length: 4:37
- Label: Sweat It Out!
- Songwriters: Jon George; Tyrone Lindqvist; James Hunt
- Producers: Jon George; Tyrone Lindqvist; James Hunt

Rüfüs singles chronology
"Innerbloom" (2015)	"Say a Prayer for Me" (2016)	"Be with You" (2016)

"Say a Prayer for Me" is a song by Australian alternative dance group Rüfüs. The song was released on 13 January 2016 as the fourth single from the group's second studio album, Bloom (2016). The song peaked at number 58 on the ARIA Chart. The song was certified gold in Australia in 2017.

== Reception ==
Tom Williams from Music Feeds called the song "super chill" saying "[it] packs some crisp grooves, layered vocals and warm synths, as well as those summery RÜFÜS vibes."

== Music video ==
The music video was directed by Toby + Pete and released on 28 January 2016. Ryan Middleton of Music Times said "The video is shot deep in woods with the three of them playing their respective instruments to the smallest crowd they will see all year. They bring their own big production along with a big laser display installed above them that walls them into one enclosed space with more lights and fog on the ground shining on them as they play."

== Track listing ==
Digital single
No.	Title	Length
1.	"Say a Prayer for Me" (album version)	4:37

Remixes single
No.	Title	Length
1.	"Say a Prayer for Me" (Marc Kinchen remix)	5:53
2.	"Say a Prayer for Me" (Marc Kinchen dub)	5:51
3.	"Say a Prayer for Me" (Alex Metric remix)	7:12
4.	"Say a Prayer for Me" (Mazde remix)	3:47

== Charts ==
Chart (2016)	Peak position
Australia (ARIA Chart)	58
Australian Independent (AIR)	4

== Certifications ==
Region	Certification	Certified units/sales
Australia (ARIA)	2× Platinum	140,000^{‡}
^{‡} Sales+streaming figures based on certification alone.

== Release history ==
Country	Version	Date	Format	Label	Catalogue
Australia	Single	13 January 2016	Digital download, streaming	Sweat It Out!	
Australia	Remixes	26 February 2016	Digital download, streaming	Sweat It Out!	SWEATDS203RDJ
