= List of top 25 albums for 2016 in Australia =

Top 25 albums of 2016 < 2015 2017 >

Other Australian top charts for 2016
- top 25 singles
- Triple J Hottest 100

Australian number-one charts of 2016
- albums
- singles
- urban singles
- dance singles
- club tracks
- digital tracks
- streaming tracks

The following lists the top 25 albums of 2016 in Australia from the Australian Recording Industry Association (ARIA) end-of-year albums chart.

Adele’s album 25 was the most popular album in 2016 in Australia, for the second year in a row. The album spent 45 weeks in the top 10.

For the 6th year in a row, Michael Bublé's Christmas made the end of year top ten. In December 2016, the album surpassed one million copies in Australia, making it the 12th biggest selling album of all-time in Australia.

Keith Urban's Ripcord was the highest selling album by an Australian artist in 2016.

== Top 25 ==
#	Title	Artist	Highest pos. reached
1	25	Adele	1
2	Ripcord	Keith Urban	1
3	Lemonade	Beyoncé	1
4	Molly: Do Yourself a Favour	Various artists	1
5	Christmas	Michael Bublé	1
6	Friends for Christmas	John Farnham & Olivia Newton-John	1
7	The Secret Daughter: Songs from the Original TV Series	Jessica Mauboy	1
8	★	David Bowie	1
9	Purpose	Justin Bieber	1
10	Suicide Squad	Various artists	1
11	A Head Full Of Dreams	Coldplay	2
12	Hardwired...To Self-Destruct	Metallica	1
13	Drinking from the Sun, Walking Under Stars Restrung	Hilltop Hoods	1
14	Views	Drake	1
15	Nothing Has Changed	David Bowie	3
16	Skin	Flume	1
17	1989	Taylor Swift	1
18	This Is Acting	Sia	1
19	The Very Best of Prince	Prince	2
20	x	Ed Sheeran	1
21	Immortalized	Disturbed	1
22	Blue & Lonesome	The Rolling Stones	1
23	Blurryface	Twenty One Pilots	7
24	Bloom	Rüfüs	1
25	Gimme Some Lovin': Jukebox Vol II	Human Nature	1

== See also ==
- List of number-one albums of 2016 (Australia)
- List of Top 25 singles for 2016 in Australia
