= Tom Thum =

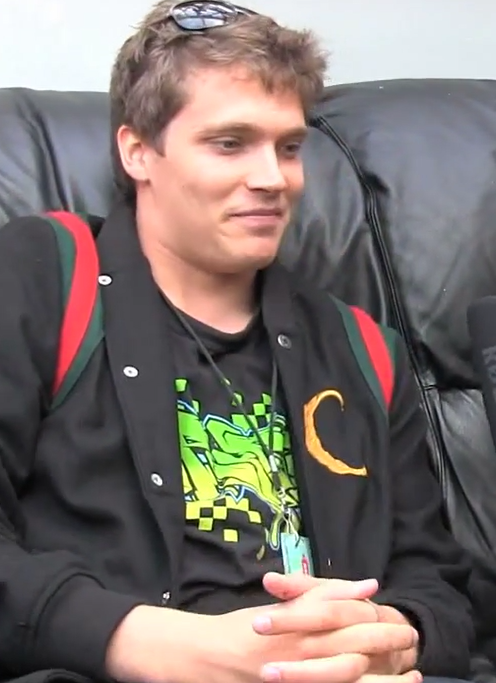
- Thum in 2012

Background information
- Born: April 1, 1985 (age 40); Brisbane, Queensland, Australia
- Occupation: Beatboxer

Tom Thum (born 1 April 1985) is an Australian beatboxer and musician. He is known for using vocal percussion to produce a wide range of sounds and instrumental effects using only his voice. He and fellow Australian Joel Turner won the Team Battle category at the 2005 World Beatbox Battle World Championship as the duo Attention Deficit Disaudio.

Thum has released vocal‑based recordings, such as his EP Ratchet Face, produced with notable collaborators, and has performed with a range of artists across genres including hip‑hop and electronic music, illustrating a range of musical engagement beyond beatboxing alone.

His 2013 TEDxSydney talk The orchestra in my mouth is featured in TED’s curated list of the most popular TEDx talks as of 2025. In 2016 he was a featured artist on the Hilltop Hoods single "1955", which peaked at number 2 on the Australian music chart.

In addition to his solo performances, Thum has been involved in several interdisciplinary music projects. He was featured in Thum Prints, a concerto for beatboxer and orchestra composed by Gordon Hamilton, which premiered in 2015 with the 16-piece Queensland Symphony Orchestra and was subsequently performed at the BBC Proms in Melbourne in 2016, blending contemporary beatboxing with orchestral music. The work has been released as an album through ABC Classics, bringing the collaboration beyond live concert halls to recorded media. He also created Basics 2 Basses, an online beatboxing masterclass series designed to teach fundamental techniques, the cultural history of beatboxing, and the development of individual styles to learners of all skill levels.
