= List of number-one dance singles of 2016 (Australia) =

ARIA Charts number-one dance singles of 2016 < 2015 2017 >

Other Australian number-one charts of 2016
- albums
- singles
- urban singles
- club tracks
- digital tracks
- streaming tracks

Top Australian singles and albums of 2016
- Triple J Hottest 100
- top 25 singles
- top 25 albums

The ARIA Dance Chart is a chart that ranks the best-performing dance singles of Australia. It is published by Australian Recording Industry Association (ARIA), an organisation who collect music data for the weekly ARIA Charts. To be eligible to appear on the chart, the recording must be a single, and be "predominantly of a dance nature, or with a featured track of a dance nature, or included in the ARIA Club Chart or a comparable overseas chart".

== Chart history ==
Date	Song	Artist(s)	Ref.
4 January	"Fast Car"	Jonas Blue featuring Dakota	
11 January	"Fast Car"	Jonas Blue featuring Dakota	
18 January	"Fast Car"	Jonas Blue featuring Dakota	
25 January	"Fast Car"	Jonas Blue featuring Dakota	
1 February	"Fast Car"	Jonas Blue featuring Dakota	
8 February	"Never Be like You"	Flume featuring Kai	
15 February	"Never Be like You"	Flume featuring Kai	
22 February	"Never Be like You"	Flume featuring Kai	
29 February	"Never Be like You"	Flume featuring Kai	
7 March	"Never Be like You"	Flume featuring Kai	
14 March	"Never Be like You"	Flume featuring Kai	
21 March	"Never Be like You"	Flume featuring Kai	
28 March	"Cheap Thrills"	Sia	
4 April	"Cheap Thrills"	Sia	
11 April	"Cheap Thrills"	Sia	
18 April	"Cheap Thrills"	Sia	
25 April	"Cheap Thrills"	Sia	
2 May	"Say It"	Flume featuring Tove Lo	
9 May	"This Is What You Came For"	Calvin Harris featuring Rihanna	
16 May	"This Is What You Came For"	Calvin Harris featuring Rihanna	
23 May	"This Is What You Came For"	Calvin Harris featuring Rihanna	
30 May	"This Is What You Came For"	Calvin Harris featuring Rihanna	
6 June	"This Is What You Came For"	Calvin Harris featuring Rihanna	
13 June	"This Is What You Came For"	Calvin Harris featuring Rihanna	
20 June	"This Is What You Came For"	Calvin Harris featuring Rihanna	
27 June	"This Is What You Came For"	Calvin Harris featuring Rihanna	
4 July	"This Is What You Came For"	Calvin Harris featuring Rihanna	
11 July	"This Is What You Came For"	Calvin Harris featuring Rihanna	
18 July	"This Is What You Came For"	Calvin Harris featuring Rihanna	
25 July	"This Is What You Came For"	Calvin Harris featuring Rihanna	
1 August	"Cold Water"	Major Lazer featuring Justin Bieber and MØ	
8 August	"Cold Water"	Major Lazer featuring Justin Bieber and MØ	
15 August	"Closer"	The Chainsmokers featuring Halsey	
22 August	"Closer"	The Chainsmokers featuring Halsey	
29 August	"Closer"	The Chainsmokers featuring Halsey	
5 September	"Closer"	The Chainsmokers featuring Halsey	
12 September	"Closer"	The Chainsmokers featuring Halsey	
19 September	"Closer"	The Chainsmokers featuring Halsey	
26 September	"Closer"	The Chainsmokers featuring Halsey	
3 October	"Closer"	The Chainsmokers featuring Halsey	
10 October	"Closer"	The Chainsmokers featuring Halsey	
17 October	"Closer"	The Chainsmokers featuring Halsey	
24 October	"Closer"	The Chainsmokers featuring Halsey	
31 October	"Closer"	The Chainsmokers featuring Halsey	
7 November	"Closer"	The Chainsmokers featuring Halsey	
14 November	"Closer"	The Chainsmokers featuring Halsey	
21 November	"Closer"	The Chainsmokers featuring Halsey	
28 November	"Rockabye"	Clean Bandit featuring Sean Paul and Anne-Marie	
5 December	"Rockabye"	Clean Bandit featuring Sean Paul and Anne-Marie	
12 December	"Rockabye"	Clean Bandit featuring Sean Paul and Anne-Marie	
19 December	"Rockabye"	Clean Bandit featuring Sean Paul and Anne-Marie	
26 December	"Rockabye"	Clean Bandit featuring Sean Paul and Anne-Marie	

== Number-one artists ==
Position	Artist	Weeks at No. 1
1	The Chainsmokers	15
2	Calvin Harris	12
2	Rihanna (as featuring)	12
3	Flume	8
4	Jonas Blue	5
4	Dakota (as featuring)	5
4	Sia	5
4	Clean Bandit	5
4	Sean Paul (as featuring)	5
4	Anne-Marie (as featuring)	5
5	Major Lazer	2
5	MØ (as featuring)	2
6	Tove Lo (as featuring)	1

== See also ==
- ARIA Charts
- List of number-one singles of 2016 (Australia)
- List of number-one albums of 2016 (Australia)
- List of number-one club tracks of 2016 (Australia)
- 2016 in music
