= The Secret Daughter: Songs from the Original TV Series =

Soundtrack album by Jessica Mauboy
- Released: 14 October 2016
- Recorded: Studios 301 Sydney, 2016
- Genre: Pop
- Label: Sony Music Australia
- Producers: Louis Schoorl, DNA Songs

Jessica Mauboy chronology
iTunes Session (2014)	The Secret Daughter: Songs from the Original TV Series (2016)	The Secret Daughter Season Two: Songs from the Original 7 Series (2017)

Singles from The Secret Daughter: Songs from the Original TV Series
- 1. "Risk It" Released: 11 August 2016; 2. "Wake Me Up" Released: 14 October 2016

The Secret Daughter: Songs from the Original TV Series is the first individual soundtrack album by Australian recording artist Jessica Mauboy, featuring music used in the television series of the same name, which stars Mauboy. The 17-track album includes five original songs by Mauboy along with covers of past and contemporary songs. The album debuted atop the ARIA Albums Chart and became Mauboy's first individual number-one album. She also became the first indigenous artist to debut at number one on that chart.

The Secret Daughter: Songs from the Original TV Series was nominated for Best Original Soundtrack, Cast or Show Album at the 2017 ARIA Music Awards.

== Singles ==
Original track "Risk It" was released as the lead single through the album's iTunes pre-order on 11 August 2016. "Risk It" was used in a commercial for The Secret Daughter television series, and a music video was released in September.

A cover version of Avicii's "Wake Me Up" was released in October 2016. "Wake Me Up" peaked at number 34 on the ARIA Singles Chart and was the only song from the album that charted.

A cover versìon of Rihanna's Diamonds" was released as a promotional single in March 2017, and is one of additional tracks included on the album's re-released secret edition.

== Reception ==
Professional ratings
Review scores
Source	Rating
auspOp	3/5 stars

David from auspOp said "While there's nothing innovative about what's on offer here, the song choices work with her voice quite well. Her cover of "Photograph" sends shivers down my spine, especially when you take the context of the lyrics and apply them to the storyline of the show. It's not the most exciting release from Jess, but there's still time left this year for a set of originals."

== Track listing ==
No.	Title	Writer(s)	Length
1.	"Risk It" (original)	DNA Songs; Tania Doko; Jörgen Elofsson	3:15
2.	"It Must Have Been Love" (Roxette song)	Per Gessle	3:37
3.	"Flame Trees" (Cold Chisel song)	Steve Prestwich; Don Walker	3:44
4.	"Good Times" (featuring J.R. Reyne) (The Easybeats song)	George Young; Johannes Hendrikus	3:06
5.	"Rocks" (featuring J.R. Reyne) (Primal Scream song)	Bobby Gillespie; Andrew Innes; Robert Young	3:05
6.	"Photograph" (Ed Sheeran song)	Ed Sheeran; Johnny McDaid	4:18
7.	"Stuck in the Middle" (original)	Jessica Mauboy; Ilan Kidron; Louis Schoori	2:56
8.	"Amazing" (Alex Lloyd song)	Alex Lloyd	3:22
9.	"Should I Stay or Should I Go" (The Clash song)	Joe Strummer; Mick Jones	2:43
10.	"Home to Me" (original)	Mauboy; Emma Birdsall; Schoorl	3:32
11.	"Big Girls Cry" (Sia song)	Sia Furler; Chris Braide	3:18
12.	"Better Be Home Soon" (Crowded House song)	Neil Finn	2:48
13.	"Closer" (original)	Birdsall; Schoorl	3:35
14.	"Tainted Love" (Gloria Jones / Soft Cell song)	Ed Cobb	3:09
15.	"Something About You" (original)	Mauboy; Hope; Birdsall; Schoorl	2:59
16.	"Wake Me Up" (Avicii song)	Avicii; Aloe Blacc; Mike Einziger; Melinda Marie Marantz; Aileen Marie Quinn	3:42
17.	"Risk It" (original / acoustic version)	DNA Songs; Tania Doko; Jörgen Elofsson	2:56

The Secret Edition
No.	Title	Writer(s)	Length
18.	"Diamonds" (Rihanna song)	Sia Furler; Benjamin Levin; Mikkel S. Eriksen; Tor Erik Hermansen	3:49
19.	"Love of the Common People" (John Hurley and Ronnie Wilkins song)	John Hurley and Ronnie Wilkins	2:28
20.	"I Fought the Law" (The Crickets song)	Sonny Curtis	2:49
21.	"Mess Is Mine" (Vance Joy song)	Vance Joy	3:04

== Charts ==
=== Weekly charts ===
Chart (2016)	Peak position
Australian Albums (ARIA)	1

=== Year-end charts ===
Chart (2016)	Position
Australian Albums (ARIA)	7
Chart (2017)	Position
Australian Albums (ARIA)	48

== Certifications ==
Region	Certification	Certified units/sales
Australia (ARIA)	Platinum	70,000^{^}
^{^} Shipments figures based on certification alone.

== See also ==
- List of number-one albums of 2016 (Australia)

== Release history ==
Country	Date	Format	Label	Catalogue	Edition
Australia	14 October 2016	CD, digital download	Sony Music Australia	88985369342	Standard
Australia	10 March 2017	CD, digital download	Sony Music Australia	88985418712	The Secret Edution
