= List of number-one urban singles of 2016 (Australia) =

ARIA Charts number-one urban singles of 2016 < 2015 2017 >

Other Australian number-one charts of 2016
- albums
- singles
- dance singles
- club tracks
- digital tracks
- streaming tracks

Top Australian singles and albums of 2016
- Triple J Hottest 100
- top 25 singles
- top 25 albums

The ARIA Urban Chart is a chart that ranks the best-performing Urban tracks singles of Australia. It is published by the Australian Recording Industry Association (ARIA), an organisation who collect music data for the weekly ARIA Charts. To be eligible to appear on the chart, the recording must be a single of a predominantly urban nature.

== Chart history ==
Issue date	Song	Artist(s)	Reference
4 January	"Downtown"	Macklemore & Ryan Lewis featuring Eric Nally, Melle Mel, Kool Moe Dee and Grandmaster Caz	
11 January	"Downtown"	Macklemore & Ryan Lewis featuring Eric Nally, Melle Mel, Kool Moe Dee and Grandmaster Caz	
18 January	"Downtown"	Macklemore & Ryan Lewis featuring Eric Nally, Melle Mel, Kool Moe Dee and Grandmaster Caz	
25 January	"Downtown"	Macklemore & Ryan Lewis featuring Eric Nally, Melle Mel, Kool Moe Dee and Grandmaster Caz	
1 February	"Downtown"	Macklemore & Ryan Lewis featuring Eric Nally, Melle Mel, Kool Moe Dee and Grandmaster Caz	
8 February	"Downtown"	Macklemore & Ryan Lewis featuring Eric Nally, Melle Mel, Kool Moe Dee and Grandmaster Caz	
15 February	"1955"	Hilltop Hoods featuring Montaigne and Tom Thum	
22 February	"1955"	Hilltop Hoods featuring Montaigne and Tom Thum	
29 February	"1955"	Hilltop Hoods featuring Montaigne and Tom Thum	
7 March	"1955"	Hilltop Hoods featuring Montaigne and Tom Thum	
14 March	"1955"	Hilltop Hoods featuring Montaigne and Tom Thum	
21 March	"1955"	Hilltop Hoods featuring Montaigne and Tom Thum	
28 March	"Work from Home"	Fifth Harmony featuring Ty Dolla Sign	
4 April	"Work from Home"	Fifth Harmony featuring Ty Dolla Sign	
11 April	"Work from Home"	Fifth Harmony featuring Ty Dolla Sign	
18 April	"Work from Home"	Fifth Harmony featuring Ty Dolla Sign	
25 April	"Work from Home"	Fifth Harmony featuring Ty Dolla Sign	
2 May	"Work from Home"	Fifth Harmony featuring Ty Dolla Sign	
9 May	"Formation"	Beyoncé	
16 May	"Work from Home"	Fifth Harmony featuring Ty Dolla Sign	
23 May	"Work from Home"	Fifth Harmony featuring Ty Dolla Sign	
30 May	"Work from Home"	Fifth Harmony featuring Ty Dolla Sign	
6 June	"Too Good"	Drake featuring Rihanna	
13 June	"Too Good"	Drake featuring Rihanna	
20 June	"Too Good"	Drake featuring Rihanna	
27 June	"Too Good"	Drake featuring Rihanna	
4 July	"Too Good"	Drake featuring Rihanna	
11 July	"Too Good"	Drake featuring Rihanna	
18 July	"Too Good"	Drake featuring Rihanna	
25 July	"Too Good"	Drake featuring Rihanna	
1 August	"Papercuts"	Illy featuring Vera Blue	
8 August	"Papercuts"	Illy featuring Vera Blue	
15 August	"Papercuts"	Illy featuring Vera Blue	
22 August	"Papercuts"	Illy featuring Vera Blue	
29 August	"Papercuts"	Illy featuring Vera Blue	
5 September	"Papercuts"	Illy featuring Vera Blue	
12 September	"Papercuts"	Illy featuring Vera Blue	
19 September	"Papercuts"	Illy featuring Vera Blue	
26 September	"Sucker for Pain"	Lil Wayne, Wiz Khalifa, Imagine Dragons, Logic, Ty Dollar Sign featuring X Ambassadors	
3 October	"Starboy"	The Weeknd featuring Daft Punk	
10 October	"Starboy"	The Weeknd featuring Daft Punk	
17 October	"Starboy"	The Weeknd featuring Daft Punk	
24 October	"Starboy"	The Weeknd featuring Daft Punk	
31 October	"Starboy"	The Weeknd featuring Daft Punk	
7 November	"Starboy"	The Weeknd featuring Daft Punk	
14 November	"Starboy"	The Weeknd featuring Daft Punk	
21 November	"Starboy"	The Weeknd featuring Daft Punk	
28 November	"Black Beatles"	Rae Sremmurd	
5 December	"Starboy"	The Weeknd featuring Daft Punk	
12 December	"Starboy"	The Weeknd featuring Daft Punk	
19 December	"Starboy"	The Weeknd featuring Daft Punk	
26 December	"Starboy"	The Weeknd featuring Daft Punk	

== Number-one artists ==
Position	Artist	Weeks at No. 1
1	The Weeknd	12
1	Daft Punk (as featuring)	12
2	Ty Dolla Sign (as featuring)	10
3	Fifth Harmony	9
4	Illy	8
4	Vera Blue (as featuring)	8
5	Drake	7
5	Rihanna (as featuring)	7
6	Macklemore & Ryan Lewis	6
6	Eric Nally (as featuring)	6
6	Melle Mel (as featuring)	6
6	Kool Moe Dee (as featuring)	6
6	Grandmaster Caz (as featuring)	6
6	Hilltop Hoods	6
6	Montaigne (as featuring)	6
6	Tom Thum (as featuring)	6
7	Beyoncé	1
7	Lil Wayne	1
7	Wiz Khalifa (as featuring)	1
7	Logic (as featuring)	1
7	Rae Sremmurd	1

== See also ==
- 2016 in music
- List of number-one singles of 2016 (Australia)
