= List of top 25 singles for 2016 in Australia =

Top 25 singles of 2016 < 2015 2017 >

Other Australian top charts for 2016
- top 25 albums
- Triple J Hottest 100

Australian number-one charts of 2016
- albums
- singles
- urban singles
- dance singles
- club tracks
- digital tracks
- streaming tracks

The following lists the top 25 singles of 2016 in Australia from the Australian Recording Industry Association (ARIA) end-of-year singles chart.

The Chainsmokers’ track "Closer", featuring Halsey, was the highest selling single in Australia in 2016 with a sales accreditation of seven times platinum. It spent nine weeks at number one.

"Never Be like You" by Flume featuring Kai was the highest selling Australian song.

#	Title	Artist	Highest pos. reached
1	"Closer"	The Chainsmokers featuring Halsey	1
2	"One Dance	Drake featuring Wizkid and Kyla	1
3	"7 Years"	Lukas Graham	1
4	"Never Be like You"	Flume featuring Kai	1
5	"Don't Let Me Down"	The Chainsmokers featuring Daya	3
6	"This Is What You Came For"	Calvin Harris featuring Rihanna	1
7	"Can't Stop the Feeling!"	Justin Timberlake	3
8	"Cheap Thrills"	Sia	6
9	"Stressed Out"	Twenty One Pilots	2
10	"Love Yourself"	Justin Bieber	1
11	"Cold Water"	Major Lazer featuring Justin Bieber and MØ	1
12	"Fast Car"	Jonas Blue featuring Dakota	1
13	"I Hate U, I Love U"	Gnash featuring Olivia O'Brien	1
14	"One Call Away"	Charlie Puth	3
15	"Work from Home"	Fifth Harmony featuring Ty Dolla Sign	3
16	"I Took a Pill in Ibiza"	Mike Posner	5
17	"Faded"	Alan Walker	2
18	"1955"	Hilltop Hoods	2
19	"Let Me Love You"	DJ Snake featuring Justin Bieber	2
20	"Say It"	Flume featuring Tove Lo	5
21	"Dancing On My Own"	Calum Scott	2
22	"Say You Won't Let Go"	James Arthur	1
23	"Starboy"	The Weeknd featuring Daft Punk	2
24	"Papercuts"	Illy featuring Vera Blue	2
25	"Just Like Fire"	P!nk	1

== See also ==
- List of number-one singles of 2016 (Australia)
- List of Australian chart achievements and milestones
