= List of number-one singles of 2016 (Australia) =

ARIA Charts number-one singles of 2016 < 2015 2017 >

Other Australian number-one charts of 2016
- albums
- urban singles
- dance singles
- club tracks
- digital tracks
- streaming tracks

Top Australian singles and albums of 2016
- Triple J Hottest 100
- top 25 singles
- top 25 albums

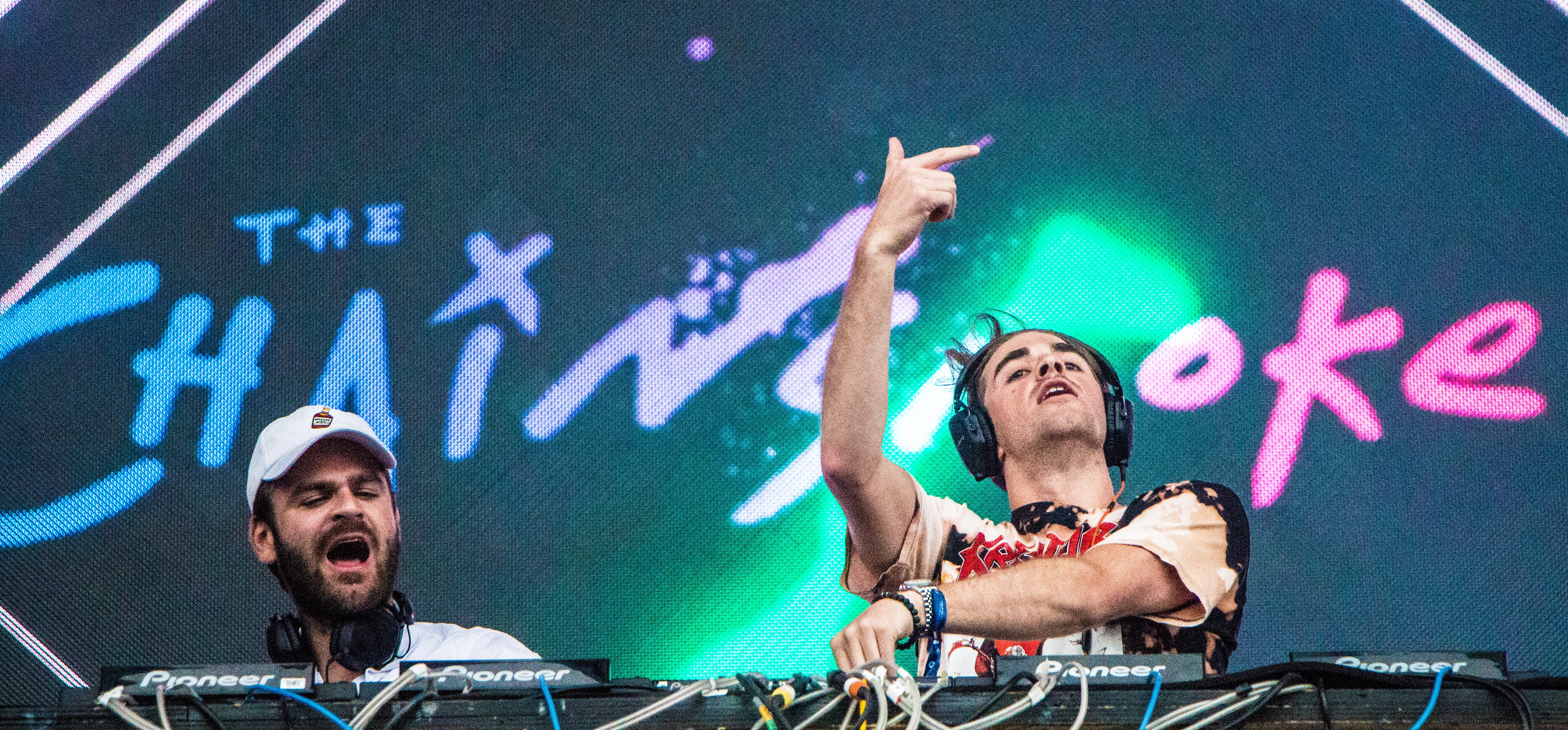
American EDM duo The Chainsmokers and featured singer Halsey both topped the chart for the first time with "Closer", spending nine consecutive weeks at number-one, making it the longest-topping single of the year and since 2014's "Que Sera".

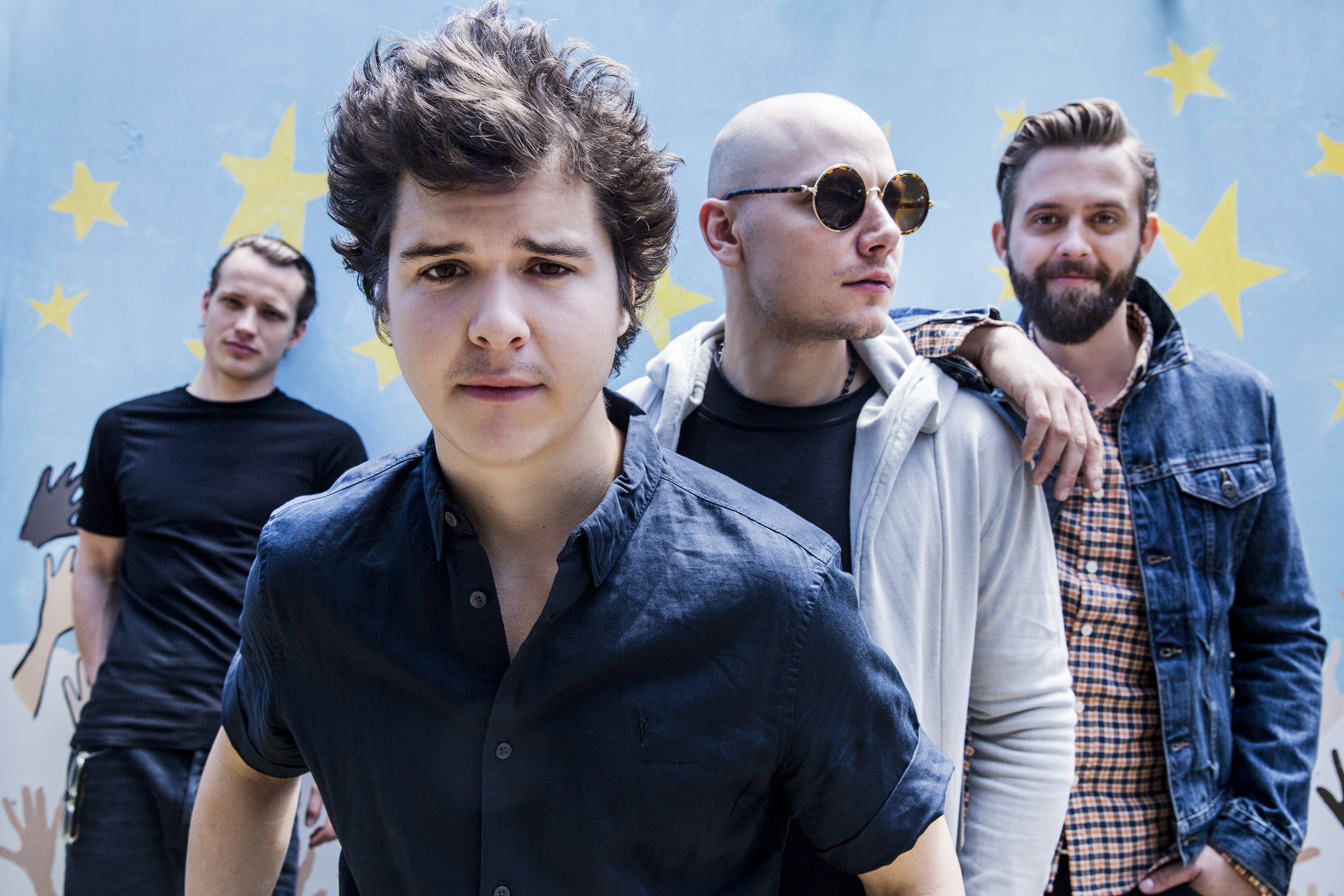
Lukas Graham's first number-one single, "7 Years", topped the chart for eight consecutive weeks, overtaking Aqua's "Doctor Jones" to become the longest topping single by a Danish group.

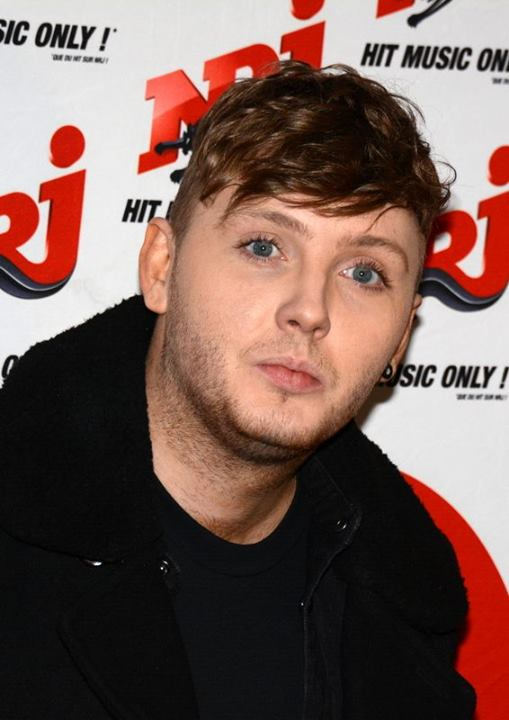
After his cover of "Impossible" reached No. 2 in 2012, British singer and X Factor winner James Arthur's first number-one single, "Say You Won't Let Go", spent seven consecutive weeks at the top of the chart.

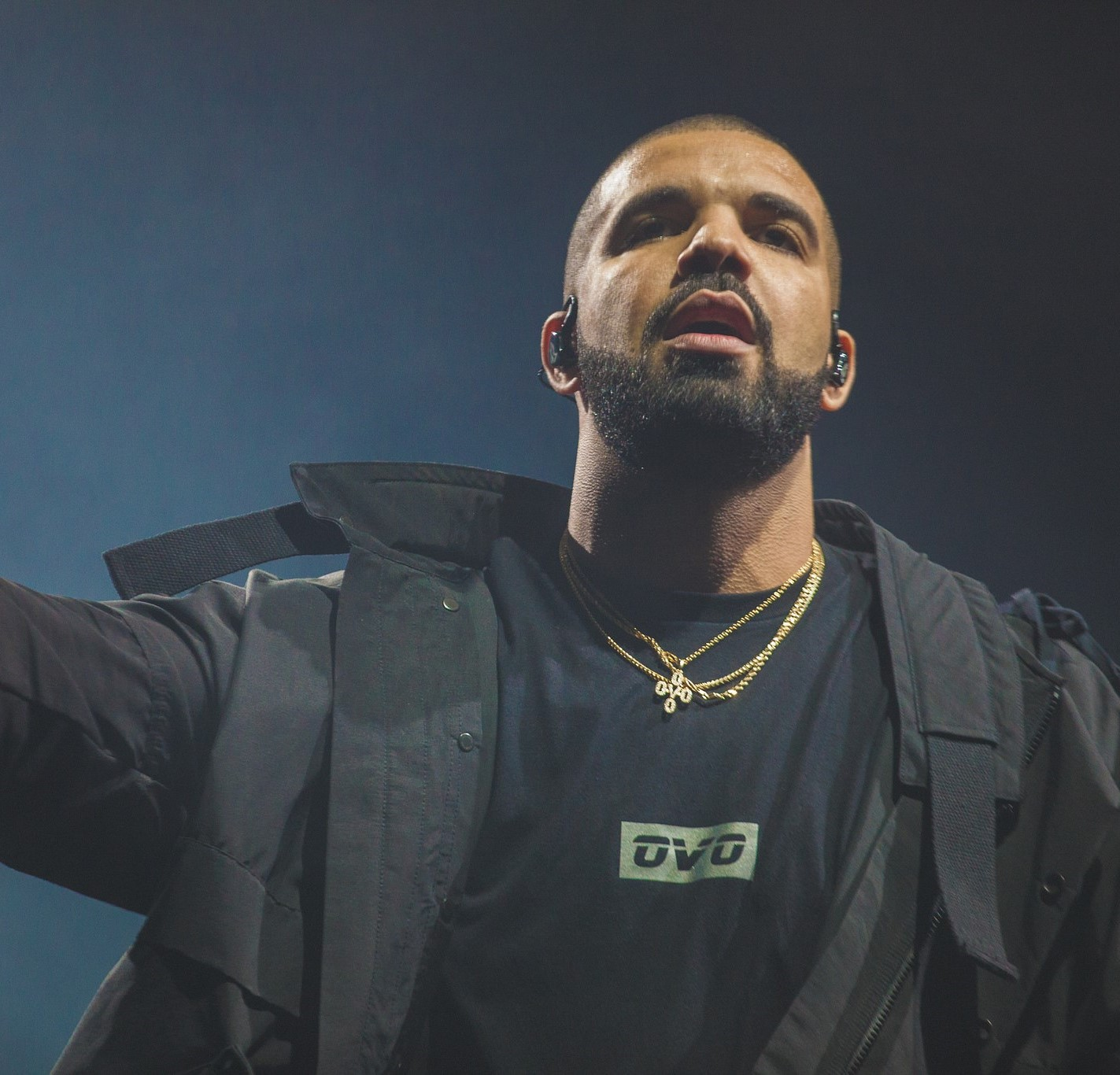
Following on from his No. 2 single "Hotline Bling" in 2015, Canadian hip hop artist Drake earned his first number-one single, as did featured artists Wizkid and Kyla, topping the chart for seven weeks with "One Dance".

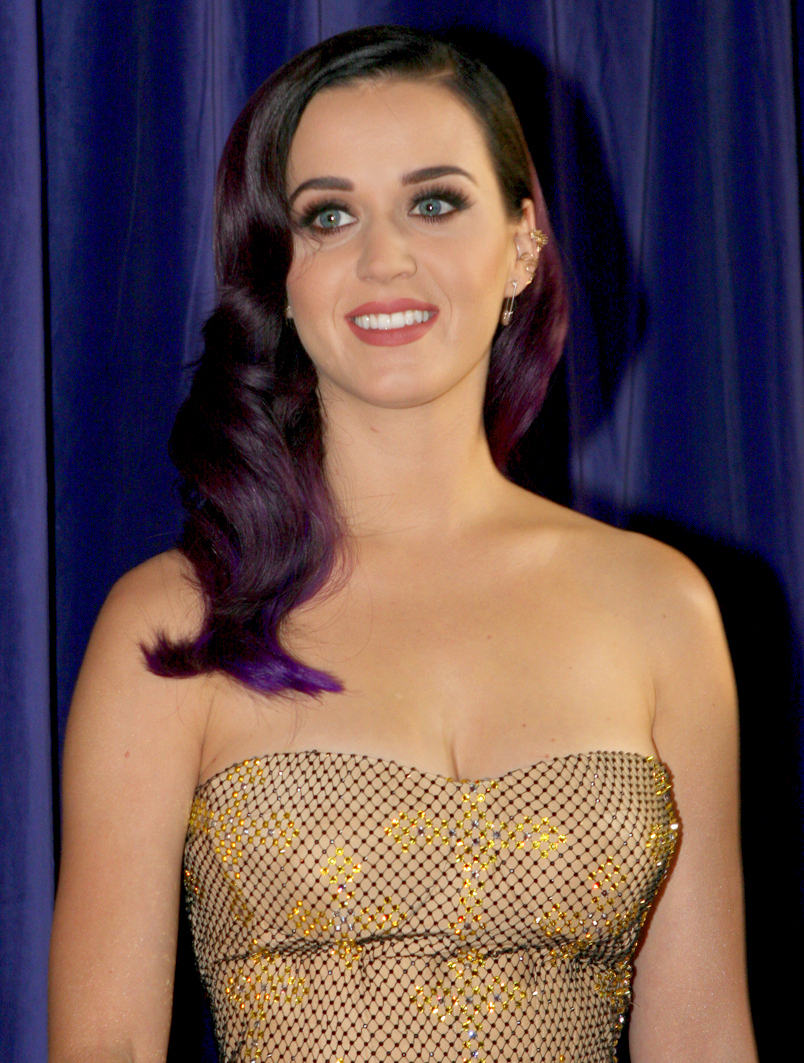
American pop singer Katy Perry earned her fourth number 1 in 2016 with "Rise" which debuted at number 1 in July 2016.

The ARIA Singles Chart ranks the best-performing singles in Australia. Its data, published by the Australian Recording Industry Association, is based collectively on the weekly physical and digital sales of singles. In 2016, fifteen singles claimed the top spot, including Justin Bieber's "Love Yourself", which started its peak position in 2015, and seventeen acts achieved their first number-one single in Australia: Jonas Blue, Dakota, Zayn, Flume, Kai, Lukas Graham, Gnash, Olivia O'Brien, Drake, Wizkid, Kyla, The Chainsmokers, Halsey, James Arthur, Clean Bandit, Sean Paul and Anne-Marie.

== Chart history ==
Key
The yellow background indicates the #1 song on ARIA's End of Year Singles Chart of 2016.

Date	Song	Artist(s)	Ref.
4 January	"Love Yourself"	Justin Bieber	
11 January	"Love Yourself"	Justin Bieber	
18 January	"Love Yourself"	Justin Bieber	
25 January	"Love Yourself"	Justin Bieber	
1 February	"Fast Car"	Jonas Blue featuring Dakota	
8 February	"Pillowtalk"	Zayn	
15 February	"Never Be Like You"	Flume featuring Kai	
22 February	"7 Years"	Lukas Graham	
29 February	"7 Years"	Lukas Graham	
7 March	"7 Years"	Lukas Graham	
14 March	"7 Years"	Lukas Graham	
21 March	"7 Years"	Lukas Graham	
28 March	"7 Years"	Lukas Graham	
4 April	"7 Years"	Lukas Graham	
11 April	"7 Years"	Lukas Graham	
18 April	"I Hate U, I Love U"	Gnash featuring Olivia O'Brien	
25 April	"I Hate U, I Love U"	Gnash featuring Olivia O'Brien	
2 May	"Just Like Fire"	Pink	
9 May	"One Dance"	Drake featuring Wizkid and Kyla	
16 May	"One Dance"	Drake featuring Wizkid and Kyla	
23 May	"One Dance"	Drake featuring Wizkid and Kyla	
30 May	"One Dance"	Drake featuring Wizkid and Kyla	
6 June	"This Is What You Came For"	Calvin Harris featuring Rihanna	
13 June	"This Is What You Came For"	Calvin Harris featuring Rihanna	
20 June	"One Dance"	Drake featuring Wizkid and Kyla	
27 June	"One Dance"	Drake featuring Wizkid and Kyla	
4 July	"One Dance"	Drake featuring Wizkid and Kyla	
11 July	"In My Blood"	The Veronicas	
18 July	"In My Blood"	The Veronicas	
25 July	"Rise"	Katy Perry	
1 August	"Cold Water"	Major Lazer featuring Justin Bieber and MØ	
8 August	"Cold Water"	Major Lazer featuring Justin Bieber and MØ	
15 August	"Closer"	The Chainsmokers featuring Halsey	
22 August	"Closer"	The Chainsmokers featuring Halsey	
29 August	"Closer"	The Chainsmokers featuring Halsey	
5 September	"Closer"	The Chainsmokers featuring Halsey	
12 September	"Closer"	The Chainsmokers featuring Halsey	
19 September	"Closer"	The Chainsmokers featuring Halsey	
26 September	"Closer"	The Chainsmokers featuring Halsey	
3 October	"Closer"	The Chainsmokers featuring Halsey	
10 October	"Closer"	The Chainsmokers featuring Halsey	
17 October	"Say You Won't Let Go"	James Arthur	
24 October	"Say You Won't Let Go"	James Arthur	
31 October	"Say You Won't Let Go"	James Arthur	
7 November	"Say You Won't Let Go"	James Arthur	
14 November	"Say You Won't Let Go"	James Arthur	
21 November	"Say You Won't Let Go"	James Arthur	
28 November	"Say You Won't Let Go"	James Arthur	
5 December	"Rockabye"	Clean Bandit featuring Sean Paul and Anne-Marie	
12 December	"Rockabye"	Clean Bandit featuring Sean Paul and Anne-Marie	
19 December	"Rockabye"	Clean Bandit featuring Sean Paul and Anne-Marie	
26 December	"Rockabye"	Clean Bandit featuring Sean Paul and Anne-Marie	

== Number-one artists ==
Position	Artist	Weeks at No. 1
1	The Chainsmokers	9
1	Halsey (as featuring)	9
2	Lukas Graham	8
3	Drake	7
3	Wizkid (as featuring)	7
3	Kyla (as featuring)	7
3	James Arthur	7
4	Justin Bieber	6
5	Clean Bandit	4
5	Sean Paul (as featuring)	4
5	Anne-Marie (as featuring)	4
6	Gnash	2
6	Olivia O'Brien (as featuring)	2
7	Calvin Harris	2
6	Rihanna (as featuring)	2
6	The Veronicas	2
6	Major Lazer	2
6	MØ (as featuring)	2
7	Jonas Blue	1
7	Dakota (as featuring)	1
7	Zayn	1
7	Flume	1
7	Kai (as featuring)	1
7	Pink	1
7	Katy Perry	1

== See also ==
- 2016 in music
- List of number-one albums of 2016 (Australia)
- List of top 25 singles for 2016 in Australia
- List of top 10 singles in 2016 (Australia)
