= Molly: Do Yourself a Favour =

2015 soundtrack album by various artists

Soundtrack album by various artists
- Released: 27 November 2015
- Genres: Pop; glam rock; rock
- Length: 3:40:57
- Label: Liberation Music

Molly: Do Yourself a Favour is the soundtrack to the two-part Australian miniseries Molly, which screened on the Seven Network in February 2016. The miniseries tells the story of Ian "Molly" Meldrum, an Australian music critic, journalist, record producer and musical entrepreneur.

The soundtrack features some of Meldrum's record productions, including Russell Morris' "The Real Thing", the Ferrets' "Don't Fall in Love" and Supernaut's "I Like It Both Ways", as well as contributions from close personal friends Elton John, Lynne Randell and Kylie Minogue and songs that recall classic Countdown moments, which Meldrum hosted from 1975 to 1987.

The physical edition features three CDs, with the first two discs including songs featured in the miniseries. The third disc includes tracks handpicked by Meldrum.

== Critical reception ==
Paul Cashmere of Noise11 said: "The songs featured in the soundtrack are not just the soundtrack to a mini-series, they capture the musical landscape of Australia across the 60s, 70s and 80s. These songs were the popular music Australian's were hearing daily on radio and became the soundtrack to many lives."

Cameron Adams from the Herald Sun gave the album 4 out of 5 stars, asking readers "How do you distil all the music lived and loved by Molly Meldrum? It's taken 60 tracks to even scratch the surface", before calling Molly a "legend".

A staff writer at The Music said that the album is "the best thing since [compilation] Ripper '76".

== Track listing ==
CD 1

1. "Evie (Part 1)" – Stevie Wright
2. "The Real Thing" – Russell Morris
3. "C'mon We're Taking Over" – Hush
4. "I Remember When I Was Young" – Matt Taylor
5. "Most People I Know (Think That I'm Crazy)" – Billy Thorpe and the Aztecs
6. "Devil Gate Drive" – Suzi Quatro
7. "Living in the 70's" – Skyhooks
8. "You Just Like Me 'Cos I'm Good in Bed" – Skyhooks
9. "Yesterday's Hero" – John Paul Young
10. "Summer Love" – Sherbet
11. "It's Almost Summer" – Billy Thorpe
12. "Only One You" – Sherbet
13. "Turn Up Your Radio" – The Masters Apprentices
14. "The Ballroom Blitz" – Sweet
15. "Girls on the Avenue" – Richard Clapton
16. "Don't Fall in Love" – The Ferrets
17. "Ego Is Not a Dirty Word" – Skyhooks
18. "I Like It Both Ways" – Supernaut
19. "Howzat" – Sherbet
20. "Matter of Time" – Sherbet

CD 2

1. "Cheap Wine" – Cold Chisel
2. "Party to End All Parties" – Skyhooks
3. "I Was Made for Lovin' You" – Kiss
4. "Please Don't Go" – KC and the Sunshine Band
5. "My Turn to Cry" – Cold Chisel
6. "One Way or Another" – Blondie
7. "I See Red" – Split Enz
8. "Modern Girl" – James Freud & The Radio Stars
9. "Ciao Baby" – Lynne Randell
10. "The Nips Are Getting Bigger" – Mental as Anything
11. "Antmusic" – Adam and the Ants
12. "Planet Earth" – Duran Duran
13. "Counting the Beat" – The Swingers
14. "Beautiful People" – Australian Crawl
15. "Hot in the City" – Billy Idol
16. "Kiss the Bride" – Elton John
17. "Out of Mind, Out of Sight" – Models
18. "Pleasure & Pain" – The Divinyls
19. "Take On Me" – A-ha
20. "Too Many Times" – Mental as Anything

CD 3

1. "Walk Like an Egyptian" – The Bangles
2. "Cant Stop the Music" – The Village People
3. "That's the Way (I Like It)" – KC and the Sunshine Band
4. "Karma Chameleon" – Culture Club
5. "Rio" – Duran Duran
6. "Friday on My Mind" – The Easybeats
7. "Sweet Dreams (Are Made of This)" – Eurythmics
8. "I Don't Like Mondays" – The Boomtown Rats
9. "Girls Just Want to Have Fun" – Cyndi Lauper
10. "Go West" – Pet Shop Boys
11. "Wake Me Up Before You Go-Go" – Wham!
12. "The Loco-Motion" – Kylie Minogue
13. "Rock Lobster" – The B-52's
14. "Bony Maronie" – Hush
15. "One Night in Bangkok" – Murray Head
16. "Brass in Pocket" – The Pretenders
17. "Down Under" – Men at Work
18. "April Sun in Cuba" – Dragon
19. "Sorrento Moon (I Remember)" – Tina Arena
20. "Your Song" – Elton John

== Charts and certifications ==
=== Weekly charts ===
Chart (2016)	Peak position
Australian Albums (ARIA)	1

=== Year-end charts ===
Chart (2016)	Position
Australian Albums (ARIA)	4
Chart (2018)	Position
Australian Albums (ARIA)	77

=== Decade-end charts ===
Chart (2010–2019)	Position
Australian Albums (ARIA)	93

=== Certifications ===
Region	Certification	Certified units/sales
Australia (ARIA)	2× Platinum	140,000^{^}
^{^} Shipments figures based on certification alone.

== Release history ==
Region	Date	Format	Edition(s)	Label	Catalogue
Australia	27 November 2015	CD; digital download	Standard	Liberation Music	LMCD0281

== See also ==
- List of number-one albums of 2016 (Australia)
