= Rise (Katy Perry song) =

2016 single by Katy Perry

Single by Katy Perry
- Released: July 14, 2016
- Studio: MXM Studios (Stockholm, Sweden); MXM Studios (Los Angeles, California)
- Genre: Electronic
- Length: 3:23
- Label: Capitol
- Songwriters: Katy Perry; Max Martin; Savan Kotecha; Ali Payami
- Producers: Max Martin; Ali Payami

Katy Perry singles chronology
"This Is How We Do" (2014)	"Rise" (2016)	"Chained to the Rhythm" (2017)

Music video
- "Rise" on YouTube

"Rise" is a song by American singer Katy Perry. She co-wrote the song with Savan Kotecha and its producers Max Martin and Ali Payami. Capitol Records first released it on July 14, 2016, as a standalone single, and Katy Perry’s first single in almost two years. "Rise" is a mid-tempo electronic song with lyrical themes of victory and rising above one's opponents. After an Olympics-themed promotional video was released the following day, an official music video debuted on August 4, 2016.

Commercially, the song reached number one in Australia, the top 10 in the Czech Republic, France, Hungary, Scotland, and Spain, the top 20 in Canada, Switzerland, and the United States, and the top 30 in Austria, New Zealand, and the United Kingdom.

== Production and release ==
NBC Sports announced upon the release of "Rise" that it would be prominently featured during its US television coverage of the 2016 Summer Olympics. Perry stated that the track is "a song that's brewing inside me for years, that has finally come to the surface", and wanted to release it as a standalone track instead of including it on an album "because now more than ever, there is a need for our world to unite", referring to the 2016 Nice terrorist attack. Half of the song had previously been written prior to the Olympics, but was not completed because she felt "it didn't come out right". Perry further added:

I can't think of a better example than the Olympic athletes, as they gather in Rio with their strength and fearlessness, to remind us how we ALL can come together, with the resolve to be the best we can be. I hope this song can inspire us to heal, unite, and rise together. I am honored that NBC Olympics has chosen to use ['Rise'] as an anthem before and during the Rio Games.

NBC felt its message spoke "directly to the spirit of the Olympics and its athletes" for its inspirational themes. It was released as a single on July 14, 2016, for streaming on Apple Music and for download on iTunes.

== Composition ==
"Rise"
"Rise" features a chorus with Perry's vocal belting that is described as her "undeniable wail promising hope for dark times".

Perry co-wrote "Rise" with Savan Kotecha and its producers Max Martin and Ali Payami. It is a mid-tempo electronic song about victory and rising above opponents. Sophie Gilbert of The Atlantic wrote the song is "a languid anthem of determination that uses an echo machine and aggressive use of metaphor to evoke icons as diverse as Katniss Everdeen, Maya Angelou, and Jesus." BenI Ratliff of The New York Times called it a "slow-footed" song. In a review for Entertainment Weekly, Kevin O'Donell noted that the song "starts with brooding atmospherics and minor-key synths before exploding into a huge chorus".

The song is three minutes and twenty-three seconds long. It is written in the key of E♭ minor with a common time tempo of 101.5 beats per minute. Perry's vocals span from D♭_{4} to E♭_{5} in the song.

== Critical reception ==
Daniel Kreps of Rolling Stone described the song as "a galvanic sequel" to "Roar". Marissa Payne from The Washington Post wrote: "Sure, it's a bit of a slow jam, but the uplifting lyrics to 'Rise' are pretty solid." The song received a mixed response from The New York Times's journalists Jon Pareles, Ben Ratliff and Jon Caramanica who deemed the song "limp", writing they feel "psyched" and "uneasy". Kevin O'Donell of Entertainment Weekly gave the song a B+.

Chris Ingalls from PopMatters described the song's nature as an "emotional delivery", and felt it worked nicely for the Olympics. Clarisse Loughrey from The Independent deemed it as "power anthem mode".

== Chart performance ==
In the United Kingdom, "Rise" became Perry's 20th entry in the UK Singles Chart top 75, when it debuted and peaked at number 25 on the chart dated 22 July 2016, with first week sales of 22,497 copies. It became the 1055th number-one song in Australia, and the second song to debut atop the ARIA Singles Chart in 2016 following "Pillowtalk" by Zayn Malik. Perry's accumulated weeks at number-one atop the chart equaled to fourteen, placing her at fifth position on the list of artist with most number-ones in the 2010s. It also became her fourth number-one in the nation after "I Kissed a Girl", "California Gurls", and "Roar", and was certified double platinum by the Australian Recording Industry Association (ARIA) for shipments of 140,000 units.

In the United States, "Rise" debuted and peaked at number 11 on the Billboard Hot 100, for the chart of August 6, 2016. It became Perry's 24th Hot 100 entry and her third-highest debut at the time behind "Part of Me" (number one) and "California Gurls" featuring Snoop Dogg (number two). It is also her first entry on the Hot 100 since 2014's "This Is How We Do". Additionally, with "Rise" debuting at number one on the Digital Songs chart with first-week sales of 137,000 downloads, Perry achieved her 11th number one on the chart, surpassing Taylor Swift who had amassed 10 number-ones. "Rise" also debuted at number 22 on the Adult Contemporary, number 24 on the Adult Pop Songs and number 33 on the Mainstream Top 40 charts. The song descended down the charts to number 43 for the next two weeks before ascending back to number 29 following the music video's release. "Rise" achieved 6.7 million US streams leading to a debut of number 42 on Streaming Songs chart, 27 million radio audience leading to a debut of number 47 on Radio Songs chart, and ascending the Digital Songs chart from 20–10 with a 24% increase in sales (47,000 copies). On the issue dated October 22, 2016, "Rise" reached number one on the Dance Club Songs, becoming Perry's sixteenth consecutive number-one on the chart. In October 2017, it was certified Platinum by the Recording Industry Association of America (RIAA) for shipments of 1 million units.

== Promotion and music video ==
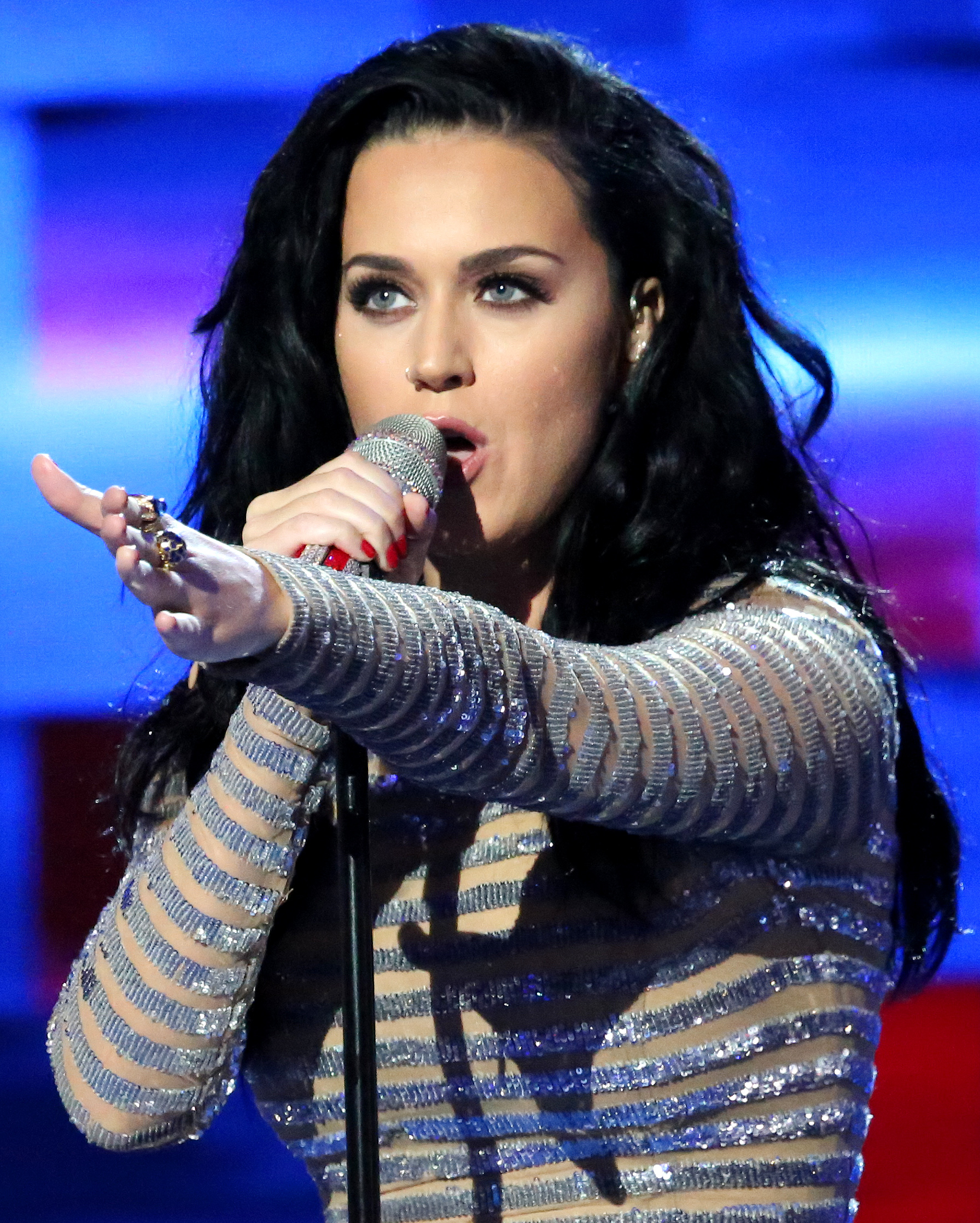
Perry performing "Rise" at the 2016 Democratic National Convention

A promotional video directed by Joseph Lee was released on July 15, 2016, featuring scenes of athletes from past Olympic Games. Daniel Kreps of Rolling Stone wrote that the video is "a riveting montage of memorable moments and athletes from Olympics' past". Billboard's Gil Kaufman called the video "inspirational", saying it has a "superstar power" with the presence of famous athletes. Bleacher Report's columnist Vanessa de Beaumont described it as a "moving tribute". The A.V. Club writer Esther Zuckerman felt that the video was "incredibly corny, but surprisingly effective". Esquire contributor Matt Miller praised it as "perfect" for having "Beautiful, sweeping shots of Brazil that are HD AF".

Perry subsequently released a teaser of the official music video on July 22, 2016, showing the singer parachuting into a body of water in the middle of a desert. A second teaser was released on August 1, and also featured Perry using a parachute, and revealed that the video would be released three days later. Paul Gore directed the video, which was released on August 4 and featured in NBC's Rio Olympics Preview Special the same day. The video was filmed in Snow Canyon State Park and Sand Hollow State Park in Utah. It shows Perry struggling to get her parachute to fly while traveling through canyons and water.

On July 28, 2016, Perry performed "Rise" live at the 2016 Democratic National Convention. She then again performed the song a second time in October 2019 at Silence The Voice. She then again performed the song a third time in June 2020 at Coke Studios Sessions. She performed with song with Pasadena Chorale in January 30, 2025 at FireAid to help with relief efforts for the January 2025 Southern California wildfires.

Perry included the song on her setlist for her 2025 world concert tour entitled Lifetimes Tour.

== Formats and track listings ==
- Digital download
1. "Rise" – 3:23
- CD
1. "Rise" – 3:23
2. "Rise" (instrumental) – 3:23
- Digital download (remixes)
1. "Rise" (Purity Ring remix) – 3:32
2. "Rise" (Monsieur Adi radio edit) – 4:01
3. "Rise" (Tālā remix) – 3:18

== Credits and personnel ==
Credits adapted from Qobuz.

- Katy Perry – lead vocals, backing vocals, songwriter
- Max Martin – producer, songwriter, backing vocals, programming, strings, trumpet
- Ali Payami – producer, songwriter, drums, electric bass, guitar, horn, keyboards, percussion, programming, strings
- Savan Kotecha – songwriter
- Sam Holland – recording engineer
- Jeremy Lertola – assistant recording engineer
- Cory Bice – assistant recording engineer
- Serban Ghenea – mixer
- John Hanes – mix engineer

== Charts ==
=== Weekly charts ===
Weekly chart performance
Chart (2016)	Peak position
Argentina (Monitor Latino)	11
Australia (ARIA)	1
Austria (Ö3 Austria Top 40)	23
Belgium (Ultratip Bubbling Under Flanders)	2
Belgium (Ultratip Bubbling Under Wallonia)	12
Canada Hot 100 (Billboard)	13
Canada AC (Billboard)	15
Canada CHR/Top 40 (Billboard)	37
Canada Hot AC (Billboard)	18
CIS Airplay (TopHit)	198
Czech Republic Airplay (ČNS IFPI)	7
Czech Republic Singles Digital (ČNS IFPI)	46
Euro Digital Songs (Billboard)	8
Finland Download (Latauslista)	1
France (SNEP)	3
Germany (GfK)	39
Hungary (Rádiós Top 40)	21
Hungary (Single Top 40)	8
Ireland (IRMA)	56
Italy (FIMI)	51
Luxembourg Digital Songs (Billboard)	7
Netherlands (Dutch Top 40)	34
Netherlands (Single Top 100)	95
New Zealand (Recorded Music NZ)	26
Portugal (AFP)	84
Scottish Singles Sales (Official Charts)	3
Slovakia Airplay (ČNS IFPI)	41
Slovakia Singles Digital (ČNS IFPI)	46
Slovenia (SloTop50)	47
Spain (Promusicae)	8
Sweden Heatseeker (Sverigetopplistan)	11
Switzerland (Schweizer Hitparade)	15
UK Singles (Official Charts)	25
US Billboard Hot 100	11
US Adult Contemporary (Billboard)	12
US Adult Pop Airplay (Billboard)	12
US Dance Club Songs (Billboard)	1
US Pop Airplay (Billboard)	23

=== Year-end charts ===
Year-end chart performance
Chart (2016)	Position
Hungary (Single Top 40)	78
Netherlands (Global Top 40)	55
US Adult Contemporary (Billboard)	39
US Dance Club Songs (Billboard)	45

== Certifications and sales ==
Certifications and sales
Region	Certification	Certified units/sales
Australia (ARIA)	2× Platinum	140,000^{‡}
Brazil (Pro-Música Brasil)	Platinum	60,000^{‡}
Finland	Gold	2,000
France	—	6,500 (Note: Available sales figures in France.)
Italy (FIMI)	Gold	25,000^{‡}
New Zealand (RMNZ)	Gold	15,000^{‡}
Norway (IFPI Norway)	Gold	30,000^{‡}
South Korea	—	5,532 (Note: South Korea sales figures as of August 6, 2016.)
United Kingdom (BPI)	Silver	200,000^{‡}
United States (RIAA)	Platinum	1,000,000^{‡}
^{‡} Sales+streaming figures based on certification alone.

== Release history ==
Release dates and formats
Region	Date	Format(s)	Version(s)	Label	Ref.
Various	July 14, 2016	Digital download; streaming	Original	Capitol	
Italy	July 15, 2016	Radio airplay	Original	Universal	
United States	July 18, 2016	Adult contemporary radio; hot adult contemporary radio; modern adult contemporary radio	Original	Capitol	
United States	July 19, 2016	Contemporary hit radio	Original	Capitol	
Germany	August 12, 2016	CD	Original; instrumental	Capitol	
Various	August 26, 2016	Digital download; streaming	Remixes	Capitol	

== See also ==
- List of Billboard Dance Club Songs number ones of 2016
- List of number-one singles of 2016 (Australia)
- List of number-one singles of 2016 (Finland)
- Artists with the most number-ones on the U.S. Dance Club Songs chart
