= Bloom (Rüfüs album) =

Studio album by Rüfüs
- Released: 22 January 2016
- Length: 51:46
- Labels: Sweat It Out; Sony Music Australia
- Producers: Tyrone Lindqvist (Note: All tracks); Jon George; James Hunt

Rüfüs chronology
Atlas (2013)	Bloom (2016)	Solace (2018)

Singles from Bloom
- 1. "You Were Right" Released: 26 June 2015; 2. "Like an Animal" Released: 25 September 2015; 3. "Innerbloom" Released: 20 November 2015; 4. "Say a Prayer for Me" Released: 13 January 2016; 5. "Be with You" Released: 1 July 2016

Professional ratings
Review scores
Source	Rating
The Guardian	2/5 stars
Herald Sun	4/5 stars
Rolling Stone Australia	3.5/5 stars
The Sydney Morning Herald	4.5/5 stars

Bloom is the second studio album by alternative dance group Rüfüs, released on 22 January 2016 via Sweat It Out and Sony Music Australia.

The album debuted and peaked at number one on the ARIA Albums Chart, and was later certified platinum in Australia in 2018.

== Singles ==
The album was preceded by five singles. "You Were Right" was released as the lead single on 26 June 2015. The song peaked at number 22 on the ARIA Charts. "Like an Animal" was released on 25 September 2015, "Innerbloom" in November 2015 and "Say a Prayer for Me" in January 2016; all prior to the album's release. "Be with You" was released as the fifth and final single in July 2016.

== Track listing ==
All music is composed by RÜFÜS DU SOL.

No.	Title	Length
1.	"Brighter"	4:43
2.	"Like an Animal"	4:04
3.	"Say a Prayer for Me"	4:38
4.	"You Were Right"	4:02
5.	"Be with You"	4:05
6.	"Daylight"	3:18
7.	"Hypnotised" (featuring Dena Kaplan)	4:07
8.	"Tell Me"	3:52
9.	"Until the Sun Needs to Rise"	4:55
10.	"Lose My Head"	4:26
11.	"Innerbloom"	9:36

== Personnel ==
Adapted from the album's liner notes.

=== Musicians ===
Rüfüs

- Tyrone Lindqvist – writing, recording, production (1–11)
- Jon George – writing, recording, production (1–11)
- James Hunt – writing, recording, production (1–11)

=== Technical ===
- Rüfüs – mixing (1–11)
- Cassian Stewart-Kasimba – mixing (1–11)
- Darren Ziesing – mastering (1–11)

== Charts ==
=== Weekly charts ===
Weekly chart performance for Bloom
Chart (2016/17)	Peak position
Australian Albums (ARIA)	1
New Zealand Albums (RMNZ)	14

=== Year-end charts ===
Year-end chart performance for Bloom
Chart (2016)	Position
Australian Albums (ARIA)	24
Australian Dance Albums (ARIA)	2
Chart (2017)	Position
Australian Dance Albums (ARIA)	14
Chart (2018)	Position
Australian Dance Albums (ARIA)	17
Chart (2019)	Position
Australian Dance Albums (ARIA)	11
Chart (2020)	Position
Australian Dance Albums (ARIA)	12
Chart (2021)	Position
Australian Dance Albums (ARIA)	14
Chart (2022)	Position
Australian Dance Albums (ARIA)	8
Chart (2023)	Position
Australian Dance Albums (ARIA)	8
Chart (2024)	Position
Australian Dance Albums (ARIA)	13
Chart (2025)	Position
Australian Dance Albums (ARIA)	18

== Certifications ==
Certifications for Bloom
Region	Certification	Certified units/sales
Australia (ARIA)	Platinum	70,000^{‡}
New Zealand (RMNZ)	2× Platinum	30,000^{‡}
^{‡} Sales+streaming figures based on certification alone.

== See also ==
- List of number-one albums of 2016 (Australia)
