= List of number-one club tracks of 2016 (Australia) =

ARIA Charts number-one club tracks of 2016 < 2015 2017 >

Other Australian number-one charts of 2016
- albums
- singles
- urban singles
- dance singles
- digital tracks
- streaming tracks

Top Australian singles and albums of 2016
- Triple J Hottest 100
- top 25 singles
- top 25 albums

This is the list of number-one tracks on the ARIA Club Chart in 2016, compiled by the Australian Recording Industry Association (ARIA) from weekly DJ reports.

== 2016 ==
Date		Song	Artist(s)	Reference
January	11	"Ocean Drive"	Duke Dumont	
January	18	"Above the Lights"	Social Hooliganz	
January	25	"Above the Lights"	Social Hooliganz	
February	1	"Meant to Be"	Scndl	
February	8	"Meant to Be"	Scndl	
February	15	"Meant to Be"	Scndl	
February	22	"From Me to You"	Yolanda Be Cool and DCUP	
February	29	"From Me to You"	Yolanda Be Cool and DCUP	
March	7	"Rinse & Repeat"	Riton featuring Kah-Lo	
March	14	"Rinse & Repeat"	Riton featuring Kah-Lo	
March	21	"Rinse & Repeat"	Riton featuring Kah-Lo	
March	28	"Rinse & Repeat"	Riton featuring Kah-Lo	
April	4	"Into You"	Odd Mob featuring Starley	
April	11	"Into You"	Odd Mob featuring Starley	
April	18	"Into You"	Odd Mob featuring Starley	
April	25	"Into You"	Odd Mob featuring Starley	
May	2	"Into You"	Odd Mob featuring Starley	
May	9	"Into You"	Odd Mob featuring Starley	
May	16	"Into You"	Odd Mob featuring Starley	
May	23	"Late at Night"	Generik	
May	30	"Walk Right In"	Colour Castle	
June	6	"Walk Right In"	Colour Castle	
June	13	"Walk Right In"	Colour Castle	
June	20	"Walk Right In"	Colour Castle	
June	27	"Walk Right In"	Colour Castle	
July	4	"Walk Right In"	Colour Castle	
July	11	"Step to Me"	Benson	
July	18	"Step to Me"	Benson	
July	25	"Step to Me"	Benson	
August	1	"Step to Me"	Benson	
August	8	"Step to Me"	Benson	
August	15	"Make Me Feel"	LO'99	
August	22	"Make Me Feel"	LO'99	
August	29	"Make Me Feel"	LO'99	
September	5	"Make Me Feel"	LO'99	
September	12	"Make Me Feel"	LO'99	
September	19	"Wings"	Armand Van Helden	
September	26	"Wings"	Armand Van Helden	
October	3	"Trouble"	Offaiah	
October	10	"You"	Dom Dolla	
October	17	"You"	Dom Dolla	
October	24	"You"	Dom Dolla	
October	31	"You"	Dom Dolla	
November	7	"You"	Dom Dolla	
November	14	"You"	Dom Dolla	
November	21	"My Way"	Calvin Harris	
November	28	"Always"	POOLCLVB	
December	5	"Chameleon"	Pnau	
December	12	"Chameleon"	Pnau	
December	19	"Chameleon"	Pnau	
December	26	"Chameleon"	Pnau	

== Number-one artists ==
Position	Artist	Weeks at No. 1
1	Odd Mob	7
1	Starley (as featuring)	7
2	Colour Castle	6
2	Dom Dolla	6
3	Benson	5
3	LO'99	5
4	Riton	4
4	Kah-Lo (as featuring)	4
4	Pnau	4
5	Scndl	3
6	Social Hooliganz	2
6	Yolanda Be Cool	2
6	DCUP	2
6	Armand Van Helden	2
7	Duke Dumont	1
7	Generik	1
7	Offaiah	1
7	Calvin Harris	1
7	POOLCLVB	1

== See also ==
- ARIA Charts
- List of number-one singles of 2016 (Australia)
- List of number-one albums of 2016 (Australia)
- List of number-one dance singles of 2016 (Australia)
- 2016 in music
