= List of number-one albums of 2016 (Australia) =

ARIA Charts number-one albums of 2016 < 2015 2017 >

Other Australian number-one charts of 2016
- singles
- urban singles
- dance singles
- club tracks
- digital tracks
- streaming tracks

Top Australian singles and albums of 2016
- Triple J Hottest 100
- top 25 singles
- top 25 albums

The ARIA Albums Chart ranks the best-performing albums and extended plays (EPs) in Australia. Its data, published by the Australian Recording Industry Association, is based collectively on the weekly physical and digital sales of albums and EPs. In 2016, 43 albums claimed the top spot, Adele's 25, and Disturbed's Immortalized already peaked at number one in 2015, and 13 acts achieved their first number-one album in Australia: The 1975, Matt Corby, Violent Soho, Zayn, Lukas Graham, Deftones, Drake, The Avalanches, Frank Ocean, A Day to Remember, Sticky Fingers, Jessica Mauboy and Illy.

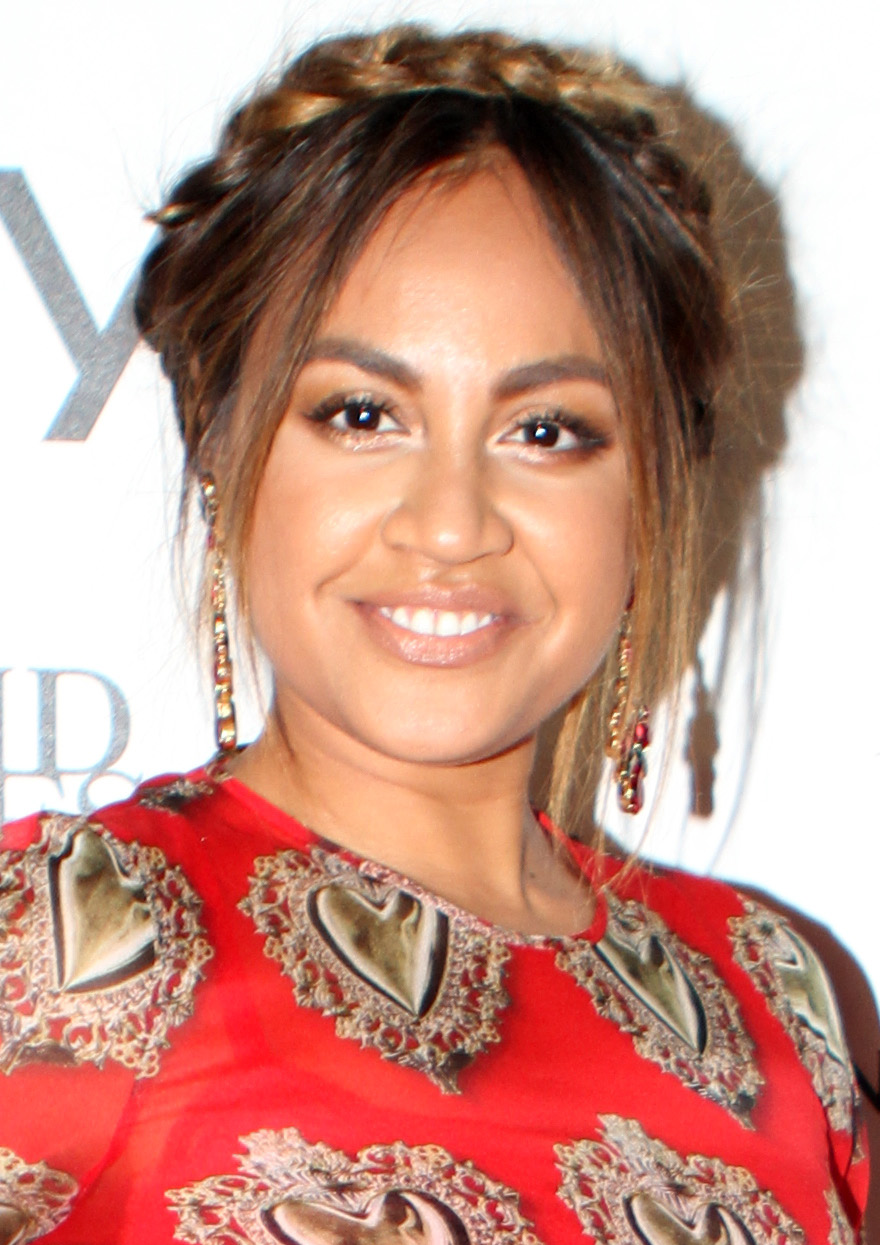
Australia's Jessica Mauboy spent the longest uninterrupted time at number-one with three weeks for The Secret Daughter: Songs from the Original TV Series, recorded for the miniseries in which she stars.

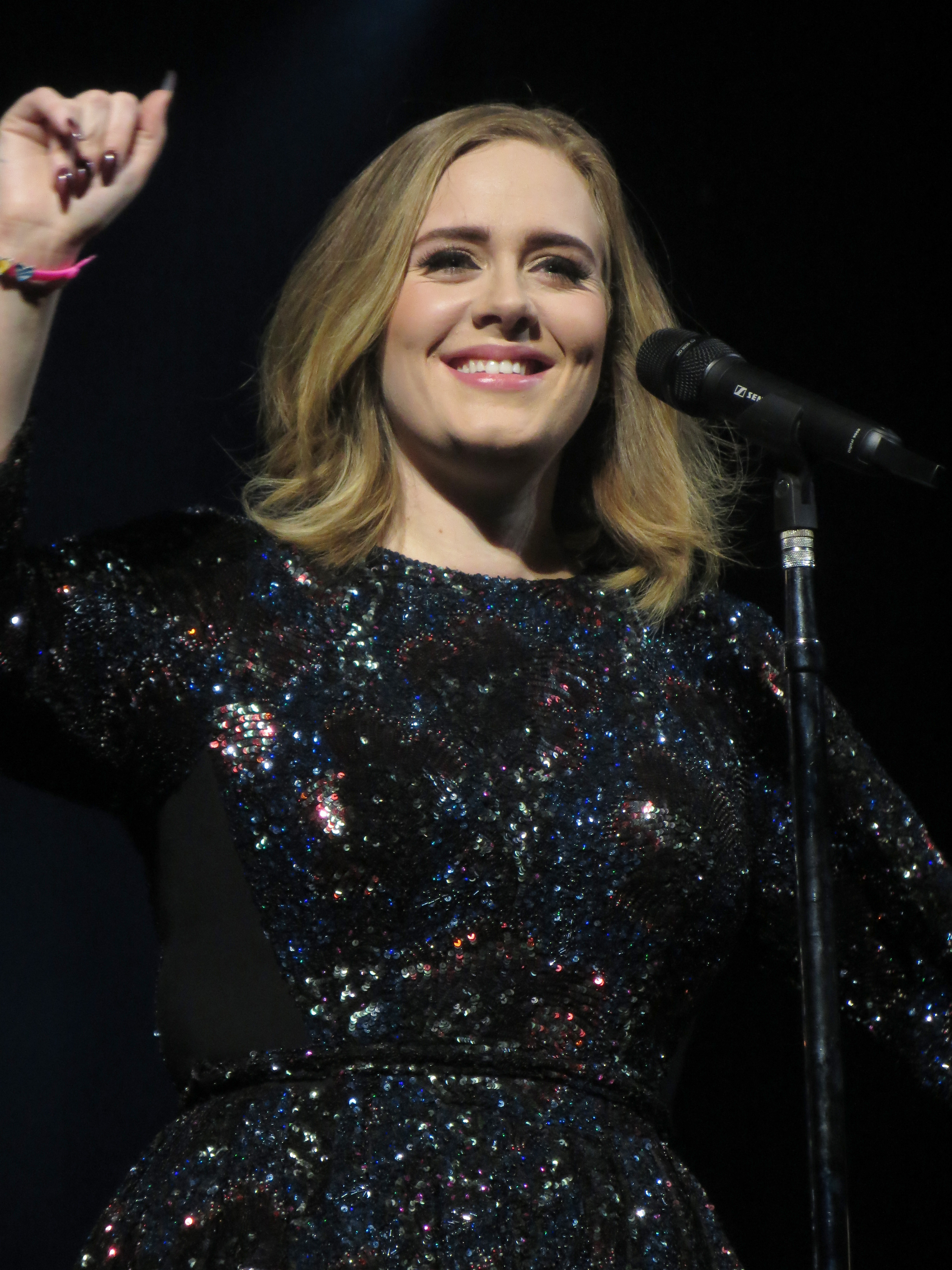
Having been at number-one for the final five weeks of 2015, British singer Adele's 25 also topped the chart for three weeks, non-consecutively, in January.

== Chart history ==
Key
The yellow background indicates the #1 album on ARIA's End of Year Albums Chart of 2016.

Date	Album	Artist(s)	Ref.
4 January	25	Adele	
11 January	25	Adele	
18 January	Blackstar	David Bowie	
25 January	25	Adele	
1 February	Bloom	RÜFÜS	
8 February	This Is Acting	Sia	
15 February	Molly: Do Yourself a Favour	Various artists	
22 February	Molly: Do Yourself a Favour	Various artists	
29 February	Drinking from the Sun, Walking Under Stars Restrung	Hilltop Hoods	
7 March	I Like It When You Sleep, for You Are So Beautiful Yet So Unaware of It	The 1975	
14 March	Rising with the Sun	The Cat Empire	
21 March	Telluric	Matt Corby	
28 March	Waco	Violent Soho	
4 April	Mind of Mine	Zayn	
11 April	Lukas Graham	Lukas Graham	
18 April	Gore	Deftones	
25 April	Immortalized	Disturbed	
2 May	Lemonade	Beyoncé	
9 May	Views	Drake	
16 May	Ripcord	Keith Urban	
23 May	Ripcord	Keith Urban	
30 May	Dangerous Woman	Ariana Grande	
6 June	Skin	Flume	
13 June	Soul Searchin'	Jimmy Barnes	
20 June	Thick as Thieves	The Temper Trap	
27 June	The Getaway	Red Hot Chili Peppers	
4 July	The Getaway	Red Hot Chili Peppers	
11 July	Wings of the Wild	Delta Goodrem	
18 July	Wildflower	The Avalanches	
25 July	Youth Authority	Good Charlotte	
1 August	Gimme Some Lovin': Jukebox Vol II	Human Nature	
8 August	Gimme Some Lovin': Jukebox Vol II	Human Nature	
15 August	Suicide Squad: The Album	Various artists	
22 August	This Could Be Heartbreak	The Amity Affliction	
29 August	Blonde	Frank Ocean	
5 September	Encore: Movie Partners Sing Broadway	Barbra Streisand	
12 September	Bad Vibrations	A Day to Remember	
19 September	Skeleton Tree	Nick Cave and the Bad Seeds	
26 September	Backbone	Anthony Callea	
3 October	Young as the Morning, Old as the Sea	Passenger	
10 October	Westway (The Glitter & the Slums)	Sticky Fingers	
17 October	Triple J's Like a Version Volume 12	Various artists	
24 October	The Secret Daughter: Songs from the Original TV Series	Jessica Mauboy	
31 October	The Secret Daughter: Songs from the Original TV Series	Jessica Mauboy	
7 November	The Secret Daughter: Songs from the Original TV Series	Jessica Mauboy	
14 November	This House Is Not for Sale	Bon Jovi	
21 November	Two Degrees	Illy	
28 November	Hardwired... to Self-Destruct	Metallica	
5 December	Starboy	The Weeknd	
12 December	Blue & Lonesome	The Rolling Stones	
19 December	Friends for Christmas	John Farnham and Olivia Newton-John	
26 December	Friends for Christmas	John Farnham and Olivia Newton-John	

== Number-one artists ==
Position	Artist	Weeks at No. 1
1	Adele	3
1	Jessica Mauboy	3
2	Keith Urban	2
2	Red Hot Chili Peppers	2
2	John Farnham	2
2	Olivia Newton-John	2
2	Human Nature	2
3	David Bowie	1
3	RÜFÜS	1
3	Sia	1
3	Hilltop Hoods	1
3	The 1975	1
3	The Cat Empire	1
3	Matt Corby	1
3	Violent Soho	1
3	Zayn	1
3	Lukas Graham	1
3	Deftones	1
3	Disturbed	1
3	Beyoncé	1
3	Drake	1
3	Ariana Grande	1
3	Flume	1
3	Jimmy Barnes	1
3	The Temper Trap	1
3	Delta Goodrem	1
3	The Avalanches	1
3	Good Charlotte	1
3	The Amity Affliction	1
3	Frank Ocean	1
3	Barbra Streisand	1
3	A Day to Remember	1
3	Nick Cave and the Bad Seeds	1
3	Anthony Callea	1
3	Passenger	1
3	Sticky Fingers	1
3	Bon Jovi	1
3	Illy	1
3	Metallica	1
3	The Weeknd	1
3	The Rolling Stones	1

== See also ==
- 2016 in music
- List of number-one singles of 2016 (Australia)
