= List of number-one streaming tracks of 2016 (Australia) =

ARIA Charts number-one streaming tracks of 2016 < 2015 2017 >

Other Australian number-one charts of 2016
- albums
- singles
- urban singles
- dance singles
- club tracks
- digital tracks

Top Australian singles and albums of 2016
- Triple J Hottest 100
- top 25 singles
- top 25 albums

The ARIA Streaming Chart ranks the best-performing streaming tracks of Australia. It is published by Australian Recording Industry Association (ARIA), an organisation who collects music data for the weekly ARIA Charts.

== Chart history ==
Key
†	Indicates number-one Streaming single of 2016

Issue date	Song	Artist(s)	Reference
4 January	"Love Yourself"	Justin Bieber	
11 January	"Love Yourself"	Justin Bieber	
18 January	"Love Yourself"	Justin Bieber	
25 January	"Love Yourself"	Justin Bieber	
1 February	"Love Yourself"	Justin Bieber	
8 February	"Love Yourself"	Justin Bieber	
15 February	"Pillowtalk"	Zayn Malik	
22 February	"Pillowtalk"	Zayn Malik	
29 February	"7 Years"	Lukas Graham	
7 March	"7 Years"	Lukas Graham	
14 March	"7 Years"	Lukas Graham	
21 March	"7 Years"	Lukas Graham	
28 March	"7 Years"	Lukas Graham	
4 April	"7 Years"	Lukas Graham	
11 April	"Work from Home"	Fifth Harmony featuring Ty Dolla Sign	
18 April	"Work from Home"	Fifth Harmony featuring Ty Dolla Sign	
25 April	"Work from Home"	Fifth Harmony featuring Ty Dolla Sign	
2 May	"One Dance"†	Drake featuring Wizkid and Kyla	
9 May	"One Dance"†	Drake featuring Wizkid and Kyla	
16 May	"One Dance"†	Drake featuring Wizkid and Kyla	
23 May	"One Dance"†	Drake featuring Wizkid and Kyla	
30 May	"One Dance"†	Drake featuring Wizkid and Kyla	
6 June	"One Dance"†	Drake featuring Wizkid and Kyla	
13 June	"One Dance"†	Drake featuring Wizkid and Kyla	
20 June	"One Dance"†	Drake featuring Wizkid and Kyla	
27 June	"One Dance"†	Drake featuring Wizkid and Kyla	
4 July	"One Dance"†	Drake featuring Wizkid and Kyla	
11 July	"One Dance"†	Drake featuring Wizkid and Kyla	
18 July	"One Dance"†	Drake featuring Wizkid and Kyla	
25 July	"One Dance"†	Drake featuring Wizkid and Kyla	
1 August	"Cold Water"	Major Lazer featuring Justin Bieber and MØ	
8 August	"Cold Water"	Major Lazer featuring Justin Bieber and MØ	
15 August	"Cold Water"	Major Lazer featuring Justin Bieber and MØ	
22 August	"Closer"	The Chainsmokers featuring Halsey	
29 August	"Closer"	The Chainsmokers featuring Halsey	
5 September	"Closer"	The Chainsmokers featuring Halsey	
12 September	"Closer"	The Chainsmokers featuring Halsey	
19 September	"Closer"	The Chainsmokers featuring Halsey	
26 September	"Closer"	The Chainsmokers featuring Halsey	
3 October	"Closer"	The Chainsmokers featuring Halsey	
10 October	"Closer"	The Chainsmokers featuring Halsey	
17 October	"Closer"	The Chainsmokers featuring Halsey	
24 October	"Closer"	The Chainsmokers featuring Halsey	
31 October	"Starboy"	The Weeknd featuring Daft Punk	
7 November	"Starboy"	The Weeknd featuring Daft Punk	
14 November	"Starboy"	The Weeknd featuring Daft Punk	
21 November	"Starboy"	The Weeknd featuring Daft Punk	
28 November	"Starboy"	The Weeknd featuring Daft Punk	
5 December	"Starboy"	The Weeknd featuring Daft Punk	
12 December	"Starboy"	The Weeknd featuring Daft Punk	
19 December	"Starboy"	The Weeknd featuring Daft Punk	
26 December	"Starboy"	The Weeknd featuring Daft Punk	

== See also ==
- 2016 in music
- ARIA Charts
- List of number-one singles of 2016 (Australia)

== Notes ==
Every issue since 1375 lists the peak position of "Don't Let Me Down" by The Chainsmokers as number one even through it never topped the chart.

== Number-one artists ==
Position	Artist	Weeks at No. 1
1	Drake	13
1	Wizkid (as featuring)	13
1	Kyla (as featuring)	13
2	The Chainsmokers	10
2	Halsey (as featuring)	10
3	The Weeknd	9
3	Daft Punk (as featuring)	9
4	Justin Bieber	8
5	Lukas Graham	6
6	Fifth Harmony	3
6	Ty Dolla Sign (as featuring)	3
6	Major Lazer	3
6	MØ (as featuring)	3
7	Zayn Malik	2
