= This Is What You Came For =

2016 single by Calvin Harris and Rihanna

Single by Calvin Harris featuring Rihanna
- Released: 29 April 2016
- Recorded: 2015
- Genre: EDM; dance-pop; house; Eurodance
- Length: 3:42
- Label: Sony UK; Westbury Road
- Songwriters: Adam Wiles; Taylor Swift (Note: Swift was originally credited under the pseudonym Nils Sjöberg.)
- Producers: Calvin Harris; Kuk Harrell

Calvin Harris singles chronology
"How Deep Is Your Love" (2015)	"This Is What You Came For" (2016)	"Hype" (2016)

Rihanna singles chronology
"Kiss It Better" and "Needed Me" (2016)	"This Is What You Came For" (2016)	"Nothing Is Promised" (2016)

Music video
- "This Is What You Came For" on YouTube

"This Is What You Came For" is a song by Scottish DJ and record producer Calvin Harris featuring Barbadian singer Rihanna. Released as a standalone single on 29 April 2016, by Sony Music UK and Westbury Road, the song was included on Harris' first compilation album, 96 Months (2024). Harris wrote the song with American singer-songwriter Taylor Swift, who was initially credited under the pseudonym Nils Sjöberg. Production was handled by Harris and Kuk Harrell. The song marked Rihanna and Harris's second collaboration, following "We Found Love" (2011).

The single debuted at number two on the UK Singles Chart. It peaked at number three on the US Billboard Hot 100, becoming Rihanna's 21st top-five song and Harris's second; the song is currently Harris's highest-peaking single as a lead artist in the US. It became Rihanna's 25th and Harris's fourth chart-topper on the Dance Club Songs and also reached number one on the US Hot Dance/Electronic Songs; the single became the 12th number one for Rihanna and Harris's tenth on the sister chart Dance/Mix Show Airplay. It topped the charts in 12 countries including Australia, Canada and Ireland, and peaked within the top ten in France, Finland, the Netherlands, Belgium, Germany, New Zealand and Switzerland. A music video for the song premiered on 17 June 2016 and features Rihanna in an open cube with images projected on the inside walls.

== Writing and release ==
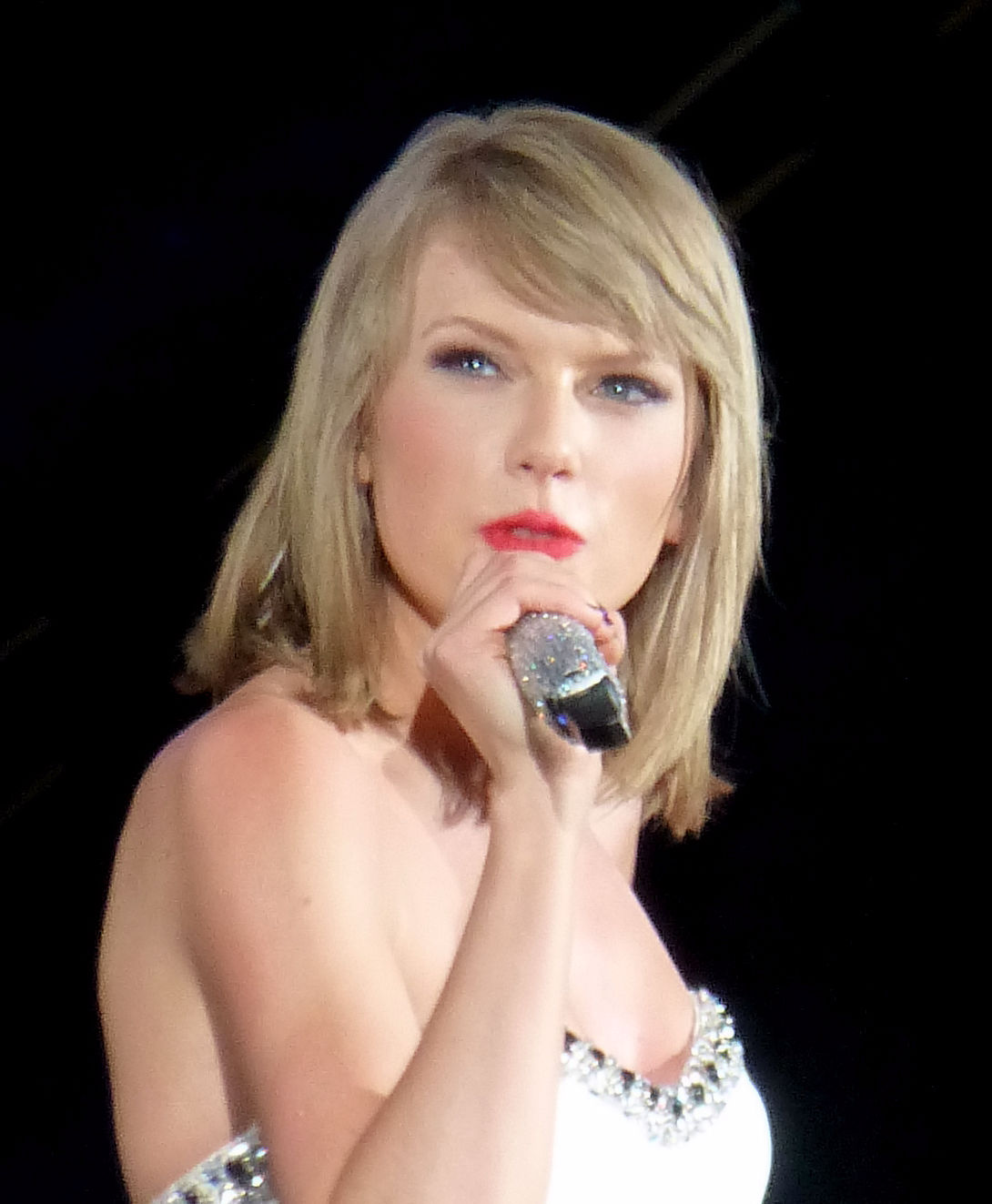
Taylor Swift (pictured in 2015) wrote the lyrics for "This Is What You Came For", but was initially credited under the pseudonym Nils Sjöberg. The song also features Swift's uncredited backing vocals.

Calvin Harris presented the final recording to Rihanna, two weeks prior to its release. During his performance at Coachella, Harris shared the song with Rihanna and her manager in her trailer. Harris stated that he was "nervous" to play her the song because he had "changed so many bits from when she first heard it." The song was released on 29 April 2016. The song marks the pair's third collaboration, following the global chart-topper "We Found Love" and the Billboard Hot 100 top-five single "Where Have You Been", which are both featured on Rihanna's sixth studio album, Talk That Talk (2011).

I think, when a pseudonym comes in is when you still have a love for making the work and you don't want the work to become overshadowed by this thing that's been built around you, based on what people know about you. And that's when it's really fun to create fake names and write under them. I wrote under the name Nils Sjöberg because those are two of the most popular names of Swedish males. I wrote this song called "This Is What You Came For" that Rihanna ended up singing. And nobody knew for a while. I remembered always hearing that when Prince wrote "Manic Monday", they didn't reveal it for a couple of months.

— Swift on penning the song, Rolling Stone

Harris and Nils Sjöberg were credited as songwriters and producers. On 13 July 2016 however, TMZ reported that the track was written by Harris's then-girlfriend, American singer-songwriter Taylor Swift, who used the pseudonym Nils Sjöberg because they did not want their relationship to overshadow the song. The track became a point of contention upon its release when Harris—in response to being asked about the possibility of collaborating with Swift during an interview with Ryan Seacrest—said that he "can't see it happening." Harris eventually confirmed on his Twitter account that Swift wrote the lyrics and contributed some background vocals, while he "wrote the music, produced the song, arranged it and cut [Rihanna's] vocals". He also confirmed Swift's previous request for secrecy as co-writer. The credit has since been officially changed to "Taylor Swift" in BMI's and ASCAP's entry for the song.

On 1 March 2023, various unreleased songs of Swift's leaked online, including her full original demo recording of "This Is What You Came For".

== Composition ==
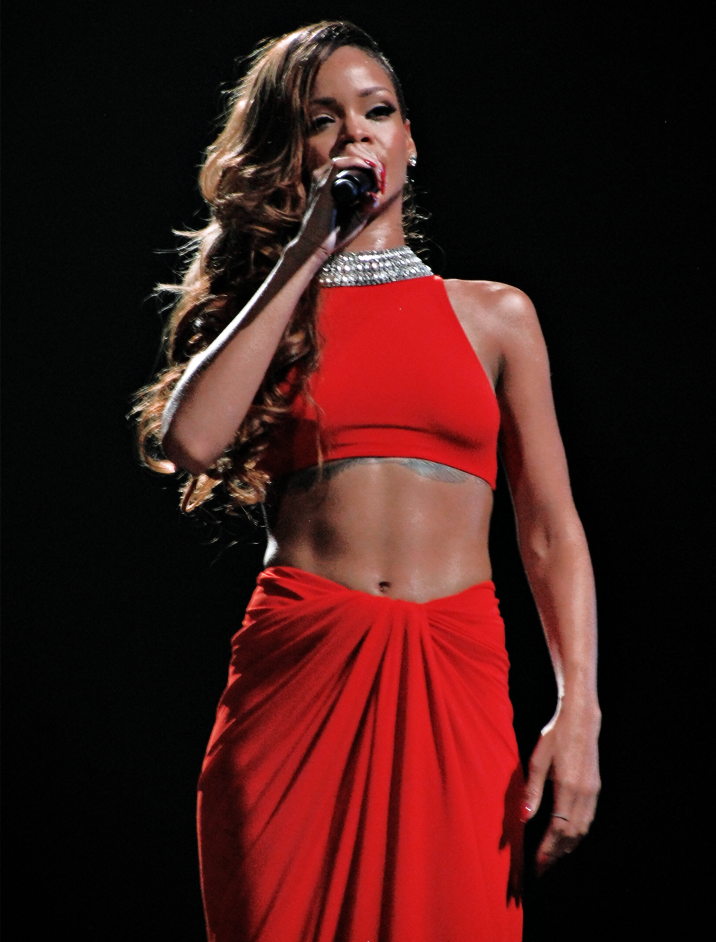
"This is What You Came For" marks Rihanna's second collaboration with Harris, following 2011's "We Found Love".

"This Is What You Came For" is an EDM, dance-pop, house and Eurodance song. Gil Kaufman of Billboard stated that the song is "a chilled-out, joyful club track that nods to classic Chicago house from the late 1980s and early 1990s, but with a modern, poppier flavor." The song is written in the key of A minor with a tempo of 124 beats per minute. The song follows a chord progression of Am–Fmaj7–G–C, and Rihanna's vocals span from G_{3} to E_{5}, amounting to 2 different octaves.

== Reception ==
=== Critical ===
"This Is What You Came For" received generally positive reviews. Lary Barleet from NME stated that "As it builds to a climax, he pulls it right back, eschewing the EDM drop in favour of voguish and mellow tropical house. It will definitely be a hit, however by manipulating her voice so much he's stripped away the personality that made 'We Found Love' such a standout, and her latest album Anti so compelling. The result is surprisingly soulless." Robbie Daw from the Idolator gave the song a positive review, stating, "The song is pretty decent Euro-centric dance floor fodder. It's just a bit subdued-which might have been the correct decision; why attempt to top a pop classic and fail when you can zig left, aiming for other territory altogether?"

=== Commercial ===
"This Is What You Came For" debuted at number two on the UK Singles Chart. The single debuted at number nine on the US Billboard Hot 100 on May 21, 2016, eventually peaking at number three on the chart on August 6, 2016, becoming Rihanna's 28th top ten hit in the US, Harris's fourth, while on the magazine's Dance/Mix Show Airplay it extended Rihanna's number-one streak on that chart to 12 (the most of any artist on that chart) and gave Harris his tenth (the most among male artists, but at the same time extended his most weeks at number one on the chart among artists to 73). "This Is What You Came For" became Rihanna's 25th and Harris's fourth number one on the Hot Dance Club Songs Chart, where it became the first song since 2013's "Wake Me Up" to stay at number one for two weeks. As of October 2016, the single has sold 1.2 million copies in the United States.

"This Is What You Came For" debuted at number one on the Scottish Singles Chart, and peaked at number one in Australia, Canada and Ireland. The song also reached the top 10 in Germany, Ireland, New Zealand, Switzerland, Belgium, Denmark, Finland, France, Hungary, Italy, the Netherlands, Norway, Portugal and Slovakia. The song has reached the top 10 in all except three of the countries it has charted in.

== Music video ==
The official music video for the song directed by Emil Nava with Director of Photography Martin Coppen, edited by Ellie Johnson, post production creative and 3D environments by Chris Hoffman, and produced and projection mapped by Matt Brown, was released to YouTube on 16 June 2016. In it, a giant white box is shown sitting in a variety of places, such as a misty field and a forest. The scene then cuts to Rihanna, dressed in a sparkly blue jumpsuit, singing while standing and dancing inside the box. While she performs, graphics are projected onto all 5 sides around her. Lasers were the only other effects used with the video projections, and were provided by Dynamic FX. These include a variety of video effects and designs, footage of a crowd partying and running horses, and a drawing of a mountain with lightning over it. The video technology used for projections blended all angles of the backing video, so it would be displayed without skewing the image and allowing it to play back in a 3D environment. This new technology was being used for the first time on this video. This video also had many scenes and different cube designs cut from it, as the filming was cut short due to time constrains. Calvin Harris makes a brief cameo appearance in the video, driving a sports car (Lamborghini Aventador). As the video ends, Rihanna walks outside, revealing the box has been set up on a dark, deserted soundstage. Two months after its release, the video reached 500 million views, and on 29 November 2016, the video reached one billion views. As of September 2025, it has reached 2.8 billion views, and is the site's 66th most viewed video.

== Live performances ==
Swift performed "This is What You Came For" on the piano for the first time live at the United States Grand Prix in Austin, Texas, on 22 October 2016. She sang the track with an acoustic guitar at the DirecTV Super Saturday Night in Houston, Texas, on 4 February 2017. Swift performed it as part of a mashup with her song "Gold Rush" (2020) at Liverpool of her Eras Tour on 14 June 2024.

== Credits and personnel ==
Credits are adapted from Tidal.

- Calvin Harris – producer, mixing engineer
- Taylor Swift – lyricist, composer, backing vocals
- Rihanna – vocals
- Kuk Harrell – producer
- Mike Marsh – mastering engineer
- Marcos Tovar – recording engineer

== Track listing ==
Digital download

1. "This Is What You Came For" – 3:41

Digital download – Remixes

1. "This Is What You Came For" (Extended Mix) – 4:47
2. "This Is What You Came For" (Dillon Francis Remix) – 3:43
3. "This Is What You Came For" (R3hab vs Henry Fong Remix) – 4:18
4. "This Is What You Came For" (R3hab Remix) – 2:30
5. "This Is What You Came For" (Grandtheft Remix) – 3:01
6. "This Is What You Came For" (Tony Junior Remix) – 3:35
7. "This Is What You Came For" (Bobby Puma Remix) – 4:44

== Charts ==
=== Weekly charts ===
Weekly chart performance for "This Is What You Came For"
Chart (2016–2017)	Peak position
Argentina Airplay (Monitor Latino)	3
Argentina Digital Songs (CAPIF)	10
Australia (ARIA)	1
Austria (Ö3 Austria Top 40)	4
Belgium (Ultratop 50 Flanders)	4
Belgium (Ultratop 50 Wallonia)	4
Brazil (Billboard Brasil Hot 100)	61
Canada Hot 100 (Billboard)	1
Canada CHR/Top 40 (Billboard)	1
Colombia (National-Report)	21
Czech Republic Airplay (ČNS IFPI)	2
Czech Republic Singles Digital (ČNS IFPI)	1
Denmark (Tracklisten)	3
Ecuador (National-Report)	4
Euro Digital Song Sales (Billboard)	1
Finland (Suomen virallinen lista)	3
France (SNEP)	5
Germany (GfK)	5
Hungary (Rádiós Top 40)	1
Hungary (Single Top 40)	1
Hungary (Dance Top 40)	1
Ireland (IRMA)	1
Israel (Media Forest)	1
Italy (FIMI)	4
Japan Hot 100 (Billboard)	63
Lebanon (Lebanese Top 20)	1
Mexico Airplay (Billboard)	1
Netherlands (Dutch Top 40)	3
Netherlands (Single Top 100)	3
New Zealand (Recorded Music NZ)	2
Norway (VG-lista)	3
Poland Airplay (ZPAV)	3
Poland Dance (ZPAV)	6
Portugal (AFP)	2
Romania (Media Forest)	3
Russia Airplay (Tophit)	1
Scottish Singles Sales (Official Charts)	1
Slovakia Airplay (ČNS IFPI)	1
Slovakia Singles Digital (ČNS IFPI)	1
Slovenia (SloTop50)	6
South Africa Airplay (EMA)	1
South Korea International (Gaon)	3
Spain (Promusicae)	3
Sweden (Sverigetopplistan)	3
Switzerland (Schweizer Hitparade)	3
UK Singles (Official Charts)	2
UK Dance (Official Charts)	1
US Billboard Hot 100	3
US Adult Contemporary (Billboard)	15
US Adult Pop Airplay (Billboard)	8
US Dance Club Songs (Billboard)	1
US Hot Dance/Electronic Songs (Billboard)	1
US Pop Airplay (Billboard)	2
US Rhythmic Airplay (Billboard)	3
Venezuela (Record Report)	72

=== Year-end charts ===
2016 year-end chart performance for "This Is What You Came For"
Chart (2016)	Position
Argentina Airplay (Monitor Latino)	8
Australia (ARIA)	6
Austria (Ö3 Austria Top 40)	27
Belgium (Ultratop Flanders)	20
Belgium (Ultratop Wallonia)	9
Canada (Canadian Hot 100)	11
Denmark (Tracklisten)	21
Germany (Official German Charts)	17
Hungary (Dance Top 40)	18
Hungary (Rádiós Top 40)	32
Hungary (Single Top 40)	13
Iceland (Plötutíóindi)	15
Israel (Media Forest)	17
Italy (FIMI)	15
Netherlands (Dutch Top 40)	10
Netherlands (Single Top 100)	18
New Zealand (Recorded Music NZ)	10
Spain (PROMUSICAE)	26
Sweden (Sverigetopplistan)	18
Switzerland (Schweizer Hitparade)	16
UK Singles (OCC)	5
US Billboard Hot 100	17
US Adult Contemporary (Billboard)	45
US Adult Top 40 (Billboard)	21
US Dance Club Songs (Billboard)	1
US Hot Dance/Electronic Songs (Billboard)	3
US Mainstream Top 40 (Billboard)	6
US Rhythmic (Billboard)	13
Venezuela English (Record Report)	2

2017 year-end chart performance for "This Is What You Came For"
Chart (2017)	Position
Argentina Airplay (Monitor Latino)	73
Brazil (Pro-Música Brasil)	155
Canada (Canadian Hot 100)	98
Hungary (Dance Top 40)	78
South Korea International (Gaon)	52
US Hot Dance/Electronic Songs (Billboard)	11

=== Decade-end charts ===
Decade-end chart performance for "This Is What You Came For"
Chart (2010–2019)	Position
Australia (ARIA)	89
UK Singles (OCC)	60
US Hot Dance/Electronic Songs (Billboard)	19

== Certifications ==
Certifications for "This Is What You Came For"
Region	Certification	Certified units/sales
Australia (ARIA)	12× Platinum	840,000^{‡}
Austria (IFPI Austria)	Platinum	30,000^{‡}
Belgium (BRMA)	2× Platinum	40,000^{‡}
Brazil (Pro-Música Brasil)	3× Diamond	750,000^{‡}
Canada (Music Canada)	4× Platinum	320,000^{‡}
Denmark (IFPI Danmark)	3× Platinum	270,000^{‡}
France (SNEP)	Diamond	233,333^{‡}
Germany (BVMI)	3× Gold	600,000^{‡}
Italy (FIMI)	5× Platinum	250,000^{‡}
Mexico (AMPROFON)	2× Diamond+3× Platinum+Gold	810,000^{‡}
New Zealand (RMNZ)	7× Platinum	210,000^{‡}
Poland (ZPAV)	2× Diamond	200,000^{‡}
Portugal (AFP)	2× Platinum	20,000^{‡}
Spain (Promusicae)	3× Platinum	180,000^{‡}
Sweden (GLF)	4× Platinum	160,000^{‡}
United Kingdom (BPI)	5× Platinum	3,000,000^{‡}
United States (RIAA)	8× Platinum	8,000,000^{‡}
Streaming
Japan (RIAJ)	Gold	50,000,000^{†}
^{‡} Sales+streaming figures based on certification alone.^{†} Streaming-only figures based on certification alone.

== Release history ==
Release formats for "This Is What You Came For"
Region	Date	Format	Version	Label	Ref.
Various	April 29, 2016	Digital download; streaming	Original	Sony UK; Westbury Road	
Italy	April 29, 2016	Radio airplay	Original	Columbia	
United States	May 3, 2016	Contemporary hit radio	Original	Columbia	
Various	August 2, 2016	Digital download; streaming	Remixes	Sony; Westbury Road	

== See also ==
- List of best-selling singles in Australia
- List of number-one singles of 2016 (Australia)
- List of number-one singles of 2016 (Ireland)
- List of number-one singles of 2016 (Scotland)
- List of UK top 10 singles in 2016
- List of UK Dance Singles Chart number ones of 2016
- List of Billboard Hot 100 top 10 singles in 2016
- List of number-one dance singles of 2016 (U.S.)
