= Dakota (singer) =

English pop singer

- Born: Sophie Ann Elton
- Genres: Pop
- Occupations: Singer; musician
- Instrument: Vocals
- Years active: 2015–present
- Labels: 70Hz; Virgin EMI; Universal Music Group

Sophie Ann Elton, known professionally as Dakota, is a British singer based in London. She is best known for singing on Jonas Blue's 2015 version of Tracy Chapman's 1988 single "Fast Car".

== Career ==
=== "Fast Car" ===
Dakota first appeared on Jonas Blue's tropical house cover of "Fast Car" in 2015, which peaked at number two on the UK Singles Chart, behind Zayn Malik's "Pillowtalk". Its UK peak meant it charted higher than Chapman's original, which peaked at number five on the chart in May 1988 and a position higher upon a re-release in April 2011. It also remained in the UK top 10 for 11 weeks. The Jonas Blue and Dakota version reached iTunes No. 1 in Germany, Sweden, Australia and New Zealand, also reaching the No. 1 spot on the US viral chart on Spotify. The single has been certified Platinum in Italy and the UK, 2× Platinum in New Zealand and 3× Platinum in Australia. To date, the track has been streamed over 537 million times on Spotify, and has achieved over 199 million views on Vevo.

=== "Call Me When You Get This" ===
On 20 July 2018, Dakota released an extended play called Call Me When You Get This, which contains the singles "Sober" featuring British rapper Not3s and "Hate Loving You".

== Discography ==
=== Singles ===
==== As lead artist ====
Title	Year	Album
"Long Hot Summer"	2016	Non-album single
"Sober" (featuring Not3s)	2018	Call Me When You Get This
"Hate Loving You"	2018	Call Me When You Get This
"Hey Mamma"	2018	Call Me When You Get This
"All I Think of Is You" (with Alex Gaudino)	2021	Non-album single

==== As featured artist ====
Title	Year	Peak chart positions										Certifications	Album
Title	Year	UK	AUS	AUT	DEN	GER	NL	NOR	NZ	SWE	US	Certifications	Album
"Fast Car" (Jonas Blue featuring Dakota)	2015	2	1	3	6	2	3	9	2	2	98	BPI: 3× Platinum; ARIA: 9× Platinum; BVMI: 3× Gold; GLF: 5× Platinum; IFPI NOR: 2× Platinum; RMNZ: 5× Platinum; RIAA: Platinum	Blue
"Dreams" (Alex Ross featuring Dakota and T-Pain)	2017	—	— (Note: "Dreams" did not enter the ARIA Top 100 Singles chart, but peaked at number nineteen on the Australian Hitseekers Singles Chart.)	—	—	—	—	—	—	—	—	BPI: Silver	Non-album single
