= 2016 in music =

This topic covers notable events and articles related to 2016 in music.

== Specific locations ==
- African music
- American music
- Asian music
- Australian music
- Brazilian music
- British music
- Canadian music
- Chinese music
- Danish music
- European music (Continental Europe)
- Finnish music
- French music
- German music
- Icelandic music
- Indian music
- Irish music
- Japanese music
- Malaysian music
- Mongolian music
- North Korean music
- Norwegian music
- Philippine music
- Polynesian music
- Scandinavian music
- South Korean music
- Swedish music
- Taiwanese music
- Vietnamese music
- World music

== Specific genres ==
- Classical
- Country
- Electronic
- Jazz
- Latin music
- Heavy metal
- Hip-hop
- Opera
- Pop
- Progressive rock
- Rock
- K-pop
- J-pop
- R&B

== Significant performances ==
- March 25 – British rock and roll band, The Rolling Stones become the first foreign rock band to perform in Cuba, which was documented in their 2016 concert film, The Rolling Stones: Havana Moon.

== Awards ==
58th Annual Grammy Awards
Record of the Year: "Uptown Funk" by Mark Ronson featuring Bruno Mars • Album of the Year: 1989 by Taylor Swift • Song of the Year: "Thinking Out Loud" – Ed Sheeran • Best New Artist: Meghan Trainor
Billboard Music Awards
Artist of the Year: Adele • New Artist of the Year: Fetty Wap • Top Hot 100 Song: "See You Again" by Wiz Khalifa • Top Billboard 200 Album: 25 by Adele
31st Golden Disc Awards
Song of the Year: "Cheer Up" by Twice • Album of the Year: Ex'Act by Exo • Rookie Artist of the Year: Blackpink, Bolbbalgan4, I.O.I, NCT 127
58th Japan Record Awards
Grand Prix: "Anata no Suki na Tokoro" (ja) by Kana Nishino • Best Singer: Masayuki Suzuki for "Melancholia" • Best New Artist: iKon • Best Song: several
Mnet Asian Music Awards
Artist of the Year: BTS • Album of the Year: Ex'Act by Exo • Song of the Year: "Cheer Up" by Twice • Best Music Video: "Whistle" by Blackpink
MTV Video Music Awards
Video of the Year: "Formation" by Beyoncé • Best Male Video: "This Is What You Came For" by Calvin Harris • Best Female Video: "Hold Up" by Beyoncé • New Artist: DNCE
MTV Europe Music Awards
Best Song: "Sorry" by Justin Bieber • Best Video: "Starboy" by the Weeknd • Best Female: Lady Gaga • Best Male: Shawn Mendes
The 4th V Chart Awards
Top Male Artist : Lu Han with Medals • Top Female Artist: Li Yuchun with "混蛋，我想你" (Idiot, I Miss You) • Top Group: TFBOYS with Adore • Top New Artist: Wang Qing & Feng Jianyu
Rock and Roll Hall of Fame
Inductees: Cheap Trick • Chicago • Deep Purple • N.W.A • Steve Miller
26th Seoul Music Awards
Grand Prize: Exo • Best Album: Wings by BTS • Best Song: "Cheer Up" by Twice • Best New Artist: NCT 127, I.O.I, Blackpink

== Bands formed ==
- 3B junior
- The Aces
- Altın Gün
- Amyl and the Sniffers
- AOA Cream
- Astro
- The Band Camino
- Batten Girls
- BEJ48
- Bis
- Blackpink
- Bolbbalgan4
- BoybandPH
- Boys Generally Asian
- The Bug Club
- Chai
- Chelmico
- CocoSori
- Confidence Man
- Cosmic Girls
- Crumb
- Dreamcar
- DYGL
- The East Light
- Exo-CBX
- Ezra Collective
- Fake Fruit
- FEMM
- FlowBack
- Gang Parade
- Geese
- GNZ48
- Gone Is Gone
- Gugudan
- Hanabie.
- The Hu
- Higher Power
- Hiragana Keyakizaka46
- I.B.I
- I.O.I
- I Dont Know How but They Found Me
- Imfact
- Japanese Breakfast
- June's Diary
- Just Mustard
- Kard
- Keyakizaka46
- KNK
- Loona
- Lovelytheband
- Magdalena Bay
- The Magpie Salute
- Mamalarky
- Mandy, Indiana
- Måneskin
- The Marías
- MASC
- Midland
- MOBB
- Model/Actriz
- Momoland
- Musubizm
- Mt. Joy
- Nation of Language
- National Youth Orchestra of China
- NCT
- NCT 127
- Nightly
- Nice As Fuck
- Nine Muses A
- Ocean Park Standoff
- Off On Off
- OnePixcel
- Pentagon
- Pillow Queens
- PrettyMuch
- Prophets of Rage
- Poppin'Party
- Pyxis
- Ranky Tanky
- The Red Clay Strays
- Regional Justice Center
- Reol
- Reyna Tropical
- Rock A Japonica
- SeeYouSpaceCowboy
- ShuuKaRen
- SF9
- SiIvaGunner
- Sinsaenum
- The Sixth Lie
- Sleep Token
- Smerz
- Sorry
- Sports Team
- Tempalay
- Terror Jr
- Unnies
- Valley
- Victon
- VIMIC
- Voisper
- Vromance
- Water from Your Eyes
- Wilderado
- The World Standard
- Why Don't We
- Yahyel
- Zenbu Kimi no Sei da.

== Soloist debuts ==
- 645AR
- Agust D
- Alex the Astronaut
- Asaka
- Ayaka Sasaki
- Billie Eilish
- Bobby
- Celeste
- Danna Paola
- Danny Worsnop
- Dean
- Dermot Kennedy
- Derrick Monasterio
- Dodie
- Ella Mai
- Elo
- Enisa Nikaj
- Era Istrefi
- Eunji
- Fei
- Finneas
- Gemma
- Grandson
- Gretta Ray
- Gun
- Hash Swan
- Hòa Minzy
- Hyoyeon
- Jang Dongwoo
- JC de Vera
- Jessica Jung
- Jessie Reyez
- Jenyer
- Jimin
- Jorja Smith
- Joy Crookes
- Jungah
- Jung Seung-hwan
- Justhis
- Jvcki Wai
- Kanna Hashimoto
- Kiana Ledé
- Kim Sejeong
- Kwak Jin-eon
- Kwon Jin-ah
- Laura Marano
- Lee Hyun-woo
- Liza Soberano
- Lolo Zouaï
- Louis Tomlinson
- Luna
- Mino
- Mint
- Momoka Ariyasu
- Mone Kamishiraishi
- Nana Ou-yang
- Niall Horan
- Noah Cyrus
- Olivia O'Brien
- PH-1
- Punchnello
- Raye
- Raveena Aurora
- Ricky Montgomery
- Ryeowook
- Sam Kim
- Sandeul
- Shenseea
- Sofia Carson
- Suga
- Subin
- Tini
- Taichi Mukai
- Tessa Violet
- Thunder
- Tiffany
- Tom Grennan
- Uru
- Yesung
- Yezi
- Ylona Garcia
- Yoochun
- Woohyun
- Zayn

== Bands reformed ==
- ABBA
- At the Drive-In
- Abandon All Ships
- The Anniversary
- Arab Strap
- Bash & Pop
- Belly
- Blake Babies
- A Different Breed of Killer
- Eric B. & Rakim
- Galactic Cowboys
- Game Theory
- G.R.L
- Guided by Voices
- Jet
- Le Tigre
- Letters to Cleo
- Misfits (featuring Glenn Danzig)
- Nasty Savage
- The Number Twelve Looks Like You
- Pendulum
- Piebald
- P.S. Eliot
- Rainbow
- Sechs Kies
- A Thorn for Every Heart
- The Revolution
- The Righteous Brothers
- Spice Girls – GEM
- Super Furry Animals
- Temple of the Dog
- A Thorn for Every Heart
- Thursday
- Tickle Me Pink
- The Union Underground
- The Vapors
- Wolf Parade
- The Zutons

== Bands on hiatus ==
- Camera Obscura
- Chiodos
- Coal Chamber
- Man Overboard
- Middle Class Rut
- One Direction
- We Are the In Crowd
- Yeah Yeah Yeahs

== Bands disbanded ==
- 2NE1
- 3rdeyegirl
- 4Minute
- Agalloch
- Allo Darlin'
- Aiden
- Bane
- Blood on the Dance Floor
- Bolt Thrower
- Boom Boom Satellites
- Crosby, Stills, Nash & Young
- Dead or Alive
- Dream
- Eagles
- Empire! Empire! (I Was a Lonely Estate)
- The Enemy
- Fearless Vampire Killers
- Finch
- For Today
- Funeral for a Friend
- FVK
- Giant Sand
- Girugamesh
- G.L.O.S.S.
- Gnashing of Teeth
- Gossip
- Graveyard
- Iona
- I, the Breather
- Jack Ü
- Joey + Rory
- Sharon Jones & The Dap-Kings
- La Ley
- A Lighter Shade of Brown
- Lionheart
- Lush
- Majical Cloudz
- Marion
- Matchbook Romance
- Maybeshewill
- Mischief Brew
- Motion City Soundtrack
- Mudvayne
- Nektar
- Nomeansno
- P.M. Dawn
- The Presidents of the United States of America
- Rainbow
- Sally Shapiro
- Thee Satisfaction
- School of Seven Bells
- SMAP
- Sockweb
- Sorry About Dresden
- Spirit of the West
- The Stooges
- Suicide
- Trailer Choir
- Transit
- Twisted Sister
- Viola Beach
- Wodensthrone
- You, Me, and Everyone We Know
- Youth Lagoon

== Deaths ==
=== January ===
- 1
  - Gilbert Kaplan, (74), American conductor and businessman, cancer.
  - Mark B, (45), British hip-hop record producer.
  - Gilberto Mendes, (93), Brazilian composer.
- 2 – Rino Salviati, (93), Italian singer, guitarist and actor.
- 3
  - Paul Bley (83), Canadian jazz pianist.
  - Jason Mackenroth (46), American rock drummer (Rollins Band, Mother Superior), prostate cancer.
- 4
  - Long John Hunter, (84), American blues guitarist and singer-songwriter.
  - Achim Mentzel, (69), German musician and television presenter.
- 5
  - Pierre Boulez, (90), French composer and conductor.
  - Nicholas Caldwell, (71), American R&B singer (The Whispers).
  - Hanna-Marie Weydahl, (93), Norwegian pianist.
- 7
  - Kitty Kallen, (94), American singer ("Little Things Mean a Lot").
  - Troy Shondell, (76), American singer, complications from Alzheimer's disease and Parkinson's disease.
- 8
  - Otis Clay, (73), American R&B and soul singer ("Tryin' to Live My Life Without You", "The Only Way Is Up"), heart attack.
  - Red Simpson, (81), American country singer-songwriter ("I'm a Truck"), complications from a heart attack.
  - Brett Smiley, (60), American singer-songwriter.
- 10 – David Bowie, (69), English songwriter and artist.
- 14 – Jane Stuart Smith, (90), American operatic soprano, hymnologist, and author.
- 17
  - Carina Jaarnek (53), Swedish singer and Dansband artist (cerebral haemorrhage).
  - Dale Griffin (67), British rock drummer (Mott the Hoople, Mott, British Lions).
- 18 – Glenn Frey (67), American guitarist and vocalist (The Eagles).
- 25 – Leif Solberg (101), Norwegian composer and organist.
- 26
  - T.J. Tindall (65), American guitarist (MFSB)
  - Black (53), Pop/new wave singer-songwriter, Traffic accident
- 28
  - Signe Toly Anderson (74), American vocalist (Jefferson Airplane).
  - Paul Kantner (74), American guitarist and vocalist (Jefferson Airplane).

=== February ===
- 3 – Maurice White (74), founder of Earth, Wind and Fire.
- 4
  - Bobby Caldwell (68), American rock keyboardist (Terry Knight and the Pack)
  - Ulf Söderblom (85), Finnish conductor.
- 13
  - Viola Beach, English indie rock band, car accident
    - Kristian "Kris" Leonard (20), guitar and vocals
    - River Reeves (19), guitar
    - Tomas Lowe (27), bass
    - Jack Dakin (19), drums
    - Craig Tarry (32), band manager
- 15
  - Joyce Paul (78), American country music singer
  - Vanity (57), American singer
- 19 – Harald Devold (51), Norwegian saxophonist (cancer).
- 20 – Ove Verner Hansen (85), Danish actor and opera singer (cardiac arrest).
- 22 – Sonny James (87), American country music singer-songwriter.
- 24 – Lennie Baker (69), American rock and roll saxophonist and singer (Sha Na Na)
- 29 – Josefin Nilsson (46), Swedish singer.

=== March ===
- 3 – Gavin Christopher, 66, American R&B singer-songwriter and producer
- 5 – Jimmy Henderson, 61, American guitarist (Black Oak Arkansas)
- 8 – George Martin, (90), English producer.
- 9
  - Ray Griff (75), Canadian country singer-songwriter, (aspiration pneumonia).
  - Naná Vasconcelos (71), Brazilian percussionist.
- 10
  - Keith Emerson (71), English pianist and keyboardist (Emerson, Lake & Palmer).
  - Ernestine Anderson (87), American jazz and blues singer
- 12
  - Tommy Brown (84), American R&B singer
  - Jimmie Snell, 69, American soul and pop singer (Limmie & Family Cookin')
- 13 – Sidney Mear, (97), American trumpeter.
- 14 – Peter Maxwell Davies, (81), English composer and conductor
- 18 – Ned Miller (90), American singer-songwriter
- 22 – Phife Dawg, (45), American rap musician (A Tribe Called Quest), complications from diabetes.
- 23 – James Jamerson, Jr., 58, American bass player (Chanson)
- 24 – Peter Anders, 74, American singer-songwriter (The Trade Winds) and record producer
- 26 – David Baker, 84, American symphonic jazz composer

=== April ===
- 2 – Gato Barbieri, (83), Argentine jazz saxophonist, pneumonia.
- 3 – Bill Henderson, (90), American jazz vocalist and actor (Clue, City Slickers, White Men Can't Jump), cancer.
- 6 – Merle Haggard, (79), American singer-songwriter ("Okie from Muskogee", "The Fightin' Side of Me", "Carolyn"), Grammy winner (1984, 1998, 1999), complications from pneumonia.
- 13 – Mariano Mores, (98), Argentine tango composer and pianist.
- 21
  - Prince, (57), American musician.
  - Lonnie Mack, (74), American rock, blues, and country singer-songwriter guitarist, natural causes.
- 24
  - Billy Paul, (81), American soul singer.
  - Papa Wemba, (66), Congolese singer and musician.
  - Jan Henrik Kayser, (81), Norwegian pianist.

=== May ===
- 1 – Sydney Onayemi (78), Nigerian-born Swedish DJ.
- 4 – Olle Ljungström (54), Swedish singer and guitarist.
- 6 – Candye Kane, (54), American blues singer and entertainer
- 9
  - Jim Manolides (76), American rock and roll bassist (The Frantics)
  - Riki Sorsa (63), Finnish singer.
- 13 – Irene Jordan, (97), American opera singer
- 14 – Lasse Mårtenson (81), Finnish singer
- 16 – Fredrik Norén (75), Swedish jazz drummer (death announced on this date)
- 17 – Guy Clark, (74), American folk and country music singer-songwriter
- 19 – John Berry, (52), American guitarist (Beastie Boys)
- 21 – Nick Menza, (51), American instrumentalist, former drummer for the band Megadeth
- 30 – Thomas Fekete, (27), American guitarist (Surfer Blood)

=== June ===
- 2 – Freddie Wadling (64), Swedish singer and songwriter.
- 3 – Dave Swarbrick, (75), British folk musician and singer-songwriter (Fairport Convention), emphysema.
- 4 – Bobby Curtola, (73), Canadian singer.
- 5 – Phyllis Curtin, (94), American soprano.
- 6 – Rolf Schweizer, (80), German composer.
- 8
  - Vladislav Yankovsky, (64), Russian musician (Novosibirsk Youth Symphony Orchestra).
  - Terje Fjærn (73), Norwegian orchestra conductor ("La det swinge").
- 9 – J. Reilly Lewis, (71), American choral conductor and Baroque music specialist, heart attack.
- 10
  - Habib, (63), Iranian singer, heart attack.
  - Christina Grimmie, (22), American singer-songwriter (Find Me) and talent show participant (The Voice), gunshot wound.
- 13 – Chips Moman, (79), American producer, songwriter, guitarist.
- 17 – Attrell Cordes, (46), American musician, producer and rapper, co-founder of P.M. Dawn.
- 18 – Alejandro Jano Fuentes (45), Mexican singer and talent show participant (La Voz... México), gunshot wound.
- 21 – Wayne Jackson (74), American soul and R&B musician (The Mar-Keys), congestive heart failure.
- 22
  - Jim Boyd (60), Native American singer-songwriter and actor.
  - Harry Rabinowitz (100), South African-born British screen music composer and conductor.
  - Amjad Sabri (39), Pakistani Qawwali singer, gunshot wound.
- 24 – Bernie Worrell, (72), American keyboardist and composer (Parliament-Funkadelic).
- 27 – Pelle Gudmundsen-Holmgreen (83), Danish composer.
- 28 – Scotty Moore (84), American guitarist (Elvis Presley).
- 29 – Rob Wasserman (64), American composer and bass player (RatDog, Lou Reed).

=== July ===
- 1 – Jimmy Arthur Ordge (80), Canadian country music singer
- 16
  - Alan Vega (78), American vocalist and visual artist (Suicide).
  - Bonnie Brown (77) American country music singer, member of The Browns.
- 18 – Karina Jensen, Danish singer (Cartoons) (cancer).
- 19 – Tamás Somló (73), Hungarian musician, singer, artist and composer (Locomotiv GT), cancer.
- 26
  - Sandy Pearlman (72), American producer (Blue Öyster Cult, The Clash), songwriter, educator, complications from cerebral hemorrhage.
  - Roye Albrighton (67), German musician (Nektar), unspecified illness.
- 27
  - Pat Upton (75), American singer-songwriter and guitarist (Spiral Starecase).
  - Einojuhani Rautavaara (87), Finnish composer.
- 31 – Mike Mohede (32), Indonesian singer and talent show participant (Indonesian Idol), heart attack.

=== August ===
- 3 – Ricci Martin (62), American musician.
- 4
  - Patrice Munsel (91), American coloratura soprano.
  - Snaffu Rigor (69), Filipino singer and songwriter, lung cancer.
- 5
  - Richard Fagan (69), American songwriter and musician, liver cancer.
  - Vander Lee (50), Brazilian singer-songwriter.
- 6 – Guillermo Anderson (54), Honduran singer, thyroid cancer.
- 7
  - B. E. Taylor (65), American musician ("Vitamin L"), brain cancer.
  - Dolores Vargas (80), Spanish singer, complications of leukemia.
  - Ruby Winters (74), American soul singer ("Make Love to Me", "I Will").
- 9
  - Pádraig Duggan (67), Irish musician (Clannad, The Duggans).
  - Jimmy Levine (61/62), American R&B musician and record producer.
- 11 – Glenn Yarbrough (86), American folk singer ("Baby the Rain Must Fall", "It's Gonna Be Fine", "San Francisco Bay Blues").
- 12 – Ruby Wilson (68), American blues, soul and gospel singer, heart attack.
- 13 – Connie Crothers (75), American jazz pianist, cancer.
- 14
  - DJ Official (39), American DJ, record producer and singer (116 Clique).
  - James Woolley (49), American keyboard and synthesizer player (Nine Inch Nails, 2wo).
- 15 – Bobby Hutcherson (75), Jazz vibraphonist, emphysema.
- 19 – Horacio Salgán (100), Argentine tango musician.
- 20
  - Matt Roberts (38), American rock guitarist (3 Doors Down), drug overdose.
  - Tom Searle (28), British rock guitarist (Architects), cancer.
- 22
  - Toots Thielemans (94), Belgian jazz musician.
  - Gilli Smyth (83), English musician (Gong).
- 28 – Juan Gabriel (66), Mexican singer and songwriter, heart attack.

=== September ===
- 1
  - Fred Hellerman, (89), American folk singer (The Weavers), guitarist, producer and songwriter.
  - Kacey Jones, (66), American singer-songwriter ("I'm the One Mama Warned You About"), producer and humorist, cancer.
- 2
  - Jerry Heller, (75), American music manager (N.W.A.).
  - Gary D., (52), German trance producer and DJ, pulmonary embolism.
- 3
  - Fred McFarlane, (55), American songwriter ("Show Me Love", "Don't Wanna Go Home"), record producer and musician.
  - Johnny Rebel, (77), American country singer.
- 7
  - Clifford Curry, (79), American beach music and R&B singer ("She Shot a Hole in My Soul").
  - Farhang Sharif, (85), Iranian musician and tar player.
  - Graham Wiggins, (53), American musician.
- 8 – Prince Buster, (78), Jamaican ska musician ("One Step Beyond", "Al Capone").
- 10 – Chris Stone, (81), American recording studio owner (Record Plant) and entrepreneur, heart attack and stroke.
- 12 – Hidayat Inayat Khan, (99), English-French composer and conductor.
- 16
  - Jerry Corbetta, (68), American musician (Sugarloaf), Pick's disease.
  - Trisco Pearson, (53), American R&B singer (Force MDs), cancer.
  - Qiao Renliang, (28), Chinese singer and actor, suicide.
- 19 – Bobby Breen, (88), Canadian-born American actor and singer, natural causes.
- 20 – Micki Marlo, (88), American singer and model.
- 21
  - Shawty Lo, (40), American hip-hop musician (D4L), traffic collision.
  - John D. Loudermilk, (82), American singer and songwriter ("Tobacco Road", "Then You Can Tell Me Goodbye", "Indian Reservation"), bone cancer.
- 24 – Buckwheat Zydeco, (68), American accordionist and zydeco musician
- 25
  - Kashif, (59), American musician (B.T. Express) and record producer.
  - Hagen Liebing, (55), German musician (Die Ärzte).
  - Jean Shepard, (82), American honky tonk singer-songwriter ("A Dear John Letter", "Slippin' Away"), Parkinson's disease.
- 26
  - Joe Clay, (78), American rockabilly musician.
  - Ioan Gyuri Pascu, (55), Romanian singer, producer, actor and comedian, heart attack.
- 27
  - Aurelian Preda, (46), Romanian folk singer, cancer.
  - Märta Schéle, (80), Swedish singer.
- 29
  - Lecresia Campbell (53), American gospel singer, pulmonary embolism.
  - Nora Dean (72), Jamaican singer.
  - Royal Torrence (82), American soul music singer (Little Royal and The Swingmasters).
- 30
  - Oscar Brand (96), Canadian-born American folk singer-songwriter, author and radio broadcaster (WNYC).
  - Michael Casswell (53), English guitarist.
  - Lilleba Lund Kvandal (76), Norwegian opera singer.

=== October ===
- 1 – Toni Williams (77), Cook Islands-born New Zealand singer.
- 2
  - Steve Byrd (61), English guitarist (Gillan, Kim Wilde), heart attack.
  - Sir Neville Marriner (92), English conductor and violinist
  - Thomas Round (100), British opera singer.
- 3
  - Ljupka Dimitrovska, (70), Macedonian-born Croatian singer.
  - K. David van Hoesen (90), American bassoonist.
  - Joan Marie Johnson (72), American singer (The Dixie Cups), heart failure.
- 4 – Caroline Crawley (53), British singer and musician (Shelleyan Orphan, This Mortal Coil).
- 5 – Pompeiu Hărășteanu (81), Romanian opera singer.
- 7 – Anne Pashley (80), British athlete and opera singer, Olympic silver medalist (1956).
- 8 – Don Ciccone (70), American singer-songwriter and musician (The Critters, The Four Seasons, Tommy James and the Shondells).
- 9
  - Bored Nothing (26), Australian musician, suicide.
  - Michiyuki Kawashima (47), Japanese musician (Boom Boom Satellites), brain tumor.
  - Quique Lucca (103), Puerto Rican musician, founder of La Sonora Ponceña.
  - Guy Nadon, (82), Canadian jazz drummer.
  - Marin Petrache Pechea (71), Romanian jazz musician, cancer.
- 10 – Issa Bagayogo,= (54), Malian musician.
- 11 – Peter Reynolds, (58), Welsh composer.
- 12
  - Robert Bateman, (80), American songwriter and record producer ("Please Mr. Postman"), heart attack.
  - Sonny Sanders (77), American songwriter, arranger and record producer.
- 15
  - Danny Champagne (65), Jamaican music producer, complications from stroke.
  - Robert Edwards (74), American singer (The Intruders), heart attack.
- 20
  - Achieng Abura, Kenyan musician.
  - Brian Edwards (72), Canadian rock bassist and singer (Mashmakhan)
  - Mieke Telkamp (82), Dutch singer.
- 23 – Pete Burns, (57), British singer (Dead or Alive)
- 24 – Bobby Vee (73) American pop singer who was a teen idol in the early 1960s
- 30 – Curly Putman, (85), American singer-songwriter. D-I-V-O-R-C-E, Green, Green Grass of Home and the subject of Paul McCartney & Wings song Junior's Farm.

=== November ===
- 1
  - Nico Carstens (90), South African accordionist and songwriter
  - Pocho La Pantera (65), Argentine cumbia singer
- 3
  - Kay Starr (94), American pop and jazz singer, complications of Alzheimer's disease.
  - W.D. Amaradeva (88), Sinhala light music pioneer, old age.
- 4
  - Eddie Harsch, 59, Canadian keyboardist (The Black Crowes)
  - Jean-Jacques Perrey, 87, French electronic music producer
- 7 – Leonard Cohen (82), Canadian singer-songwriter
- 11
  - Victor Bailey (56), American jazz bass guitarist
  - Esma Redžepova-Teodosievska, (73), Macedonian vocalist, songwriter, and humanitarian of Romani ethnicity.
- 12 – Jacques Werup (71), Swedish musician and writer.
- 13 – Leon Russell (74), American musician and songwriter
- 15
  - Holly Dunn (59), American country singer-songwriter
  - Mose Allison (89), American pianist and singer.
- 18 – Sharon Jones (60), American soul and funk singer
- 20 – Craig Gill (44), English drummer (Inspiral Carpets), self-inflicted
- 24
  - Colonel Abrams (67), American musician and singer-songwriter
  - Pauline Oliveros (84), American composer
- 29 – Allan Zavod (71), Australian keyboardist and composer
- 30 – Ivar Thomassen (62), Norwegian folk singer, songwriter, and jazz pianist.

=== December ===
- 2
  - Cash Askew (22), guitarist (Them Are Us Too)
  - Mark Gray (64), American singer-songwriter (Exile)
- 4 – Ralph Johnson (67), American singer (The Impressions)
- 7 – Brian Bennett (65), American garage-rock keyboardist (The Cherry Slush)
- 8
  - Greg Lake (69), English progressive-rock vocalist and multi-instrumentalist (Emerson, Lake & Palmer)
  - Junaid Jamshed (52), Pakistani singer-songwriter (Vital Signs), flight collision
- 11 – Joe Ligon (80), American gospel singer (Mighty Clouds of Joy)
- 24 – Rick Parfitt (68), English musician and songwriter (Status Quo)
- 25
  - George Michael (53), English singer-songwriter (Wham!)
  - 64 members of Alexandrov Ensemble (Red Army Choir), 2016 Russian Defence Ministry Tupolev Tu-154 crash

== Musical films ==
- Florence Foster Jenkins
- La La Land
- Oasis: Supersonic
- Sing Street
- The Beatles: Eight Days a Week

== See also ==
- Timeline of musical events
- Women in music
