= 2016 in Asian music =

== Events ==
- March 29 – The ISCM World Music Days, 2016, festival opens in Tongyeong, South Korea.
- April 26 – The ABU Radio Song Festival 2016 takes place in Beijing, China, with fourteen countries participating.
- May 13 – The Borneo Jazz Festival opens in Miri, Sarawak.
- June 22 – Pakistani singer Amjad Sabri appears on a morning TV show in Karachi. On his way home, his car is fired on by two motorcyclists, fatally injuring Sabri. The killing was claimed by a splinter group of the Pakistani Taliban who accused Sabri of blasphemy.
- September 10 – Ah Ruem Ahn of South Korea wins the 15th International Grieg Piano Competition.
- September 10–11 – Ultra Singapore took place.
- October 22 – The ABU TV Song Festival 2016 took place in Bali.
- December – The Turkvision Song Contest took place in Istanbul, Turkey.

== Albums ==
- Babymetal – Metal Resistance
- Band-Maid – Brand New Maid
- Mohsen Chavoshi – Amire Bi Gazand
- Momoiro Clover Z – Hakkin no Yoake
- Exo – Ex'Act
- GOT7 – Moriagatteyo
- Ayumi Hamasaki – Made in Japan
- Shalabee Ibrahim – Hidhaaee Noor
- Imran Mahmudul – Adhek Tumi (with Bappa Mazumder)
- Nogizaka46 – Sorezore no Isu
- Junko Onishi – Tea Times

== Classical ==
- Mehmet Ali Sanlıkol – Harabat / The Intoxicated'

== Opera ==
- Du Yun and Royce Vavrek – Angel's Bone

== Deaths ==
- January 7 – Houshang Ostovar, 88, Iranian composer
- January 9 – Cielito del Mundo, 80, Filipino singer, actress and politician
- January 27 – Georgy Firtich, 77, Russian composer and pianist
- February 9 – Quan Minyu, 12, Chinese singer (DIPG)
- February 18 – Abdul Rashid Khan, 107, Hindustani musician
- March 6 – Kalabhavan Mani, 45, Indian actor and singer (liver cirrhosis and methyl alcohol poisoning)
- March 17 – Trần Lập, 42, Vietnamese rock singer (colorectal cancer)
- March 18 – Adnan Abu Hassan, 57, Malaysian composer (stroke, diabetes and kidney failure)
- March 23 – Gegham Grigoryan, Armenian opera singer, 65
- May 2 – Balwantrai Bhatt, 94, Indian composer and musician
- May 5 – Isao Tomita, 84, Japanese synthesizer musician, composer and arranger (Snowflakes Are Dancing)
- June 7 – Amber Gurung, 78, Nepalese composer, singer, and lyricist
- June 10 – Habib, 63, Iranian singer (heart attack)
- June 22 – Amjad Sabri, 45, Pakistani qawwali singer (shot)
- July 7 – Om Prakash Sonik, 77, Indian composer
- July 30 – Mike Mohede, 33, Indonesian singer
- November 3 – W. D. Amaradeva, 88, Sri Lankan violinist, singer and composer

== See also ==
- 2016 in music
- 2016 in Indian music
- 2016 in Japanese music
- List of K-pop releases in 2016
