= 2016 in European music =

2016 in continental European music in geographical order.

== Events ==
- 13 February – All four members of British rock band Viola Beach, and their manager, are killed when their car crashes off a bridge and into a river in Södertälje, Sweden.
- 22 April – Romania is forced to withdraw from the Eurovision Song Contest because of failure to repay an old debt.
- 14 May – Ukraine win the Eurovision Song Contest, in Stockholm, Sweden, with the song "1944", performed by Jamala.

== Scandinavia ==
- Main article for Scandinavian music in 2016

=== Denmark ===
- Main article for Danish music in 2016
- Denmark in the Eurovision Song Contest 2016
- Danish #1s

=== Finland ===
- Main article for Finnish music in 2016
- Finland in the Eurovision Song Contest 2016
- Finnish #1 singles2015, #1 albums

=== Norway ===
- Main article for Norwegian music in 2016
- Norway in the Eurovision Song Contest 2016
- Norway charts

=== Sweden ===
- Main article for Swedish music in 2016
- Sweden in the Eurovision Song Contest 2016
- Swedish #1 singles and albums

== Netherlands ==
Dutch #1 singles

== Ireland ==
- Main article for Irish music in 2016

== UK ==
- Main article for British music in 2016

== Germany ==
- German number ones
- EFF, a project of Felix Jaehn is immediately successful with their first single "Stimme".
- Kurdish-German rapper Azad, Bosse, Schiller, AnnenMayKantereit, all have #1 albums.

== Switzerland and Austria ==
- Swiss #1s

== France ==
- French #1s
- Imany has a European hit with "Don't be so shy", with a #1 in Germany, Austria, Poland and Russia.

== Italy ==
Italian number ones

== Eastern Europe/ Balkans ==
- List of Polish #1 singles
- Czech #1 singles
- Hungarian #1 singles

== Deaths ==
- 2 January – Michel Delpech, French singer-songwriter and actor, 69
- 9 January – Jānis Vaišļa, Latvian musician (Pirates of the Sea), 46 (cardiac amyloidosis)
- 6 February – Eddy Wally, Belgian singer, 83
- 21 February – Piotr Grudziński, 40, Polish guitarist (Riverside).
- 22 February – Hans Reffert, German musician and composer, 69
- 23 February – Johnny Murphy, Irish musician and actor (The Commitments), 72
- 5 March – Nikolaus Harnoncourt, Austrian conductor and cellist, 86
- 5 March – François-Eudes Chanfrault, French composer, 41
- 22 April — Ojārs Grīnbergs, Latvian singer, 73
- 26 April – Gabriele Sima, Austrian opera singer, 61
- 29 April – Dmytro Hnatyuk, Ukrainian operatic baritone, 91
- 11 May – Peter Behrens, German drummer, actor, musician, and clown, 68
- 17 May – Huguette Dreyfus, French harpsichordist, 87Huguette Dreyfus, 87, French harpsichordist.
- 2 June – Corry Brokken, Dutch singer, Eurovision Song Contest 1957 winner, 83
- 26 July – Roye Albrighton, German musician (Nektar), 67
- 27 July – Einojuhani Rautavaara, Finnish composer, 87
- 7 August – Dolores Vargas, Spanish singer, 80
- 22 August – Toots Thielemans, Belgian jazz musician, 94
