= Ahmed Agadi =

Russian-Tartar opera tenor (born 1965)

Ahmed Agadi Әхмәт Әхәди
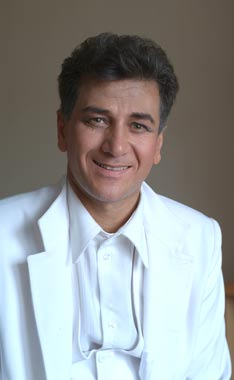
- Ahmed Agadi portraying Gabdulla Tukay

Background information
- Born: 30 March 1965 (age 61); Sovkhoz, Kirovsky District, Shymkent, Kazakh SSR, USSR
- Genre: Opera
- Occupation: Opera singer
- Instrument: Voice (tenor)
- Years active: 1993–present

Ahmed Eltifatovich Agadi (Әхмәт Илтифат улы Әхәди; born 30 March 1965) is a Russian-Tatar tenor opera singer. He is an Honored Artist of the Russian Federation (1999), and a People's Artist of the Republic of Tatarstan (2001). He is a recipient of the Gabdulla Tukay State Prize of the Republic of Tatarstan (2008) and the Golden Mask Award (2008).

== Early life and education ==
Ahmed Agadi was born on 30 March 1965 in the village of Sovkhoz, Kirovsky District, Shymkent, Kazakh SSR, USSR.

His father, Eltifat Agadi, was ethnically Persian and lived in Tabriz. At the age of 20, he was drafted into the Shah's army. After the end of the Second World War, in 1946, he was captured at the border and sent to Siberia for forced labor. After completing his term, he remained in Soviet Kazakhstan, where he worked as a shepherd at a state farm. His mother, Anisa, née Sadrieva, came from the Orenburg Tatars. After her husband went to the front, her mother left Soviet Tataria for Kazakhstan with her two children. She soon fell ill and died, after which Anisa and her brother were taken in by an Uzbek foster family.

Anisa and Eltifat Agadi had ten children – four daughters and six sons. Ahmed was the seventh child and the youngest of the brothers. He graduated from a rural Kazakh school. From an early age, he became accustomed to work, working in the fields and tending sheep together with his father. He became interested in singing as a child and participated in his school's vocal and instrumental ensemble. In everyday life he spoke Kazakh; he learned Russian by the age of twenty, and later also mastered the Tatar language.

After finishing school, at the age of 18, he was drafted into the Soviet Army. He initially served in Lithuania and later transferred to Novosibirsk. He participated in army amateur performances and subsequently became a soloist in the military unit's brass band under military conductor N. Ustyuzhanin. Under his guidance, Agadi studied musical notation and prepared to enter the Novosibirsk Conservatory, but was not admitted. He attempted to enter the popular music department of the Novosibirsk Music College, but was rejected there as well. Recognizing the applicant's natural, self-taught talent, college teacher N. Dynkina began working with him. With her, Agadi studied singing, music literature, Russian, history, and philosophy. Remaining in the army for extended service and continuing to perform with the military band, he was admitted to the college on his second attempt. While studying there, he became a prizewinner at a military district vocal competition.

In 1988, he moved to Moscow, where he passed a highly competitive entrance examination and entered the Moscow State Tchaikovsky Conservatory. He studied in the class of Professor E. Kibkalo. In 1993, he received a diploma at the M. I. Glinka International Vocal Competition.

During his third year of study, he was accepted as a trainee at the Moscow Musical Theatre named after K. S. Stanislavski and V. I. Nemirovich-Danchenko. After graduating from the conservatory in 1993, he spent the next 11 years as a soloist with the theatre's opera company. His first role was Lensky in Pyotr Tchaikovsky's opera Eugene Onegin. He gained stage experience under the direction of A. Titel.

== Operatic career ==
Since 2005, he has been a soloist with the Mariinsky Theatre's opera company, which he joined at the invitation of Valery Gergiev. His first role at the theatre was Don José in Georges Bizet's Carmen. He names Giacomo Puccini, Pietro Mascagni, Giuseppe Verdi, and Ruggero Leoncavallo as his favorite composers. Among singers of the past, he listens to Enrico Caruso, Plácido Domingo, and Luciano Pavarotti.

He tours extensively in Russia and abroad, participates in opera festivals, and has performed on many opera stages around the world, including the Bolshoi Theatre in Moscow, the Mikhailovsky Theatre in Saint Petersburg, the Krasnoyarsk Opera in Krasnoyarsk, the Novosibirsk Opera and Ballet Theatre in Novosibirsk, the Samara Opera Theatre in Samara, the Bolshoi Theatre of Belarus in Minsk, the Royal Danish Theatre in Copenhagen, the Strasbourg Opera in Strasbourg, Teatro Colón in Buenos Aires, the Royal Albert Hall in London, the Dutch Opera in Amsterdam, and the Hungarian State Opera in Budapest.

Since 1995, he has collaborated with the Musa Jalil Tatar Opera and Ballet Theatre. He has repeatedly taken part in the International Feodor Chaliapin Opera Festival in Kazan; in 1998, for example, he was recognized as the best voice of the competition.

In 2006, he became the first singer on the Tatar stage to perform the role of the poet Gabdulla Tukay in the newly staged opera The Poet's Love by Rezeda Akhiyarova, with a libretto by Renat Kharis.

For this work, in 2008 he was awarded the Gabdulla Tukay State Prize of the Republic of Tatarstan and the Golden Mask Award.

In 2011, he performed the role of the poet Musa Jalil in Nazib Zhiganov's opera Jalil, with a libretto by Ahmed Faizi, in a new production by Mikhail Pandzhavidze. In 2018, he portrayed Ivan the Terrible at the premiere of the opera Syuyumbike by Akhiyarova and Kharis.

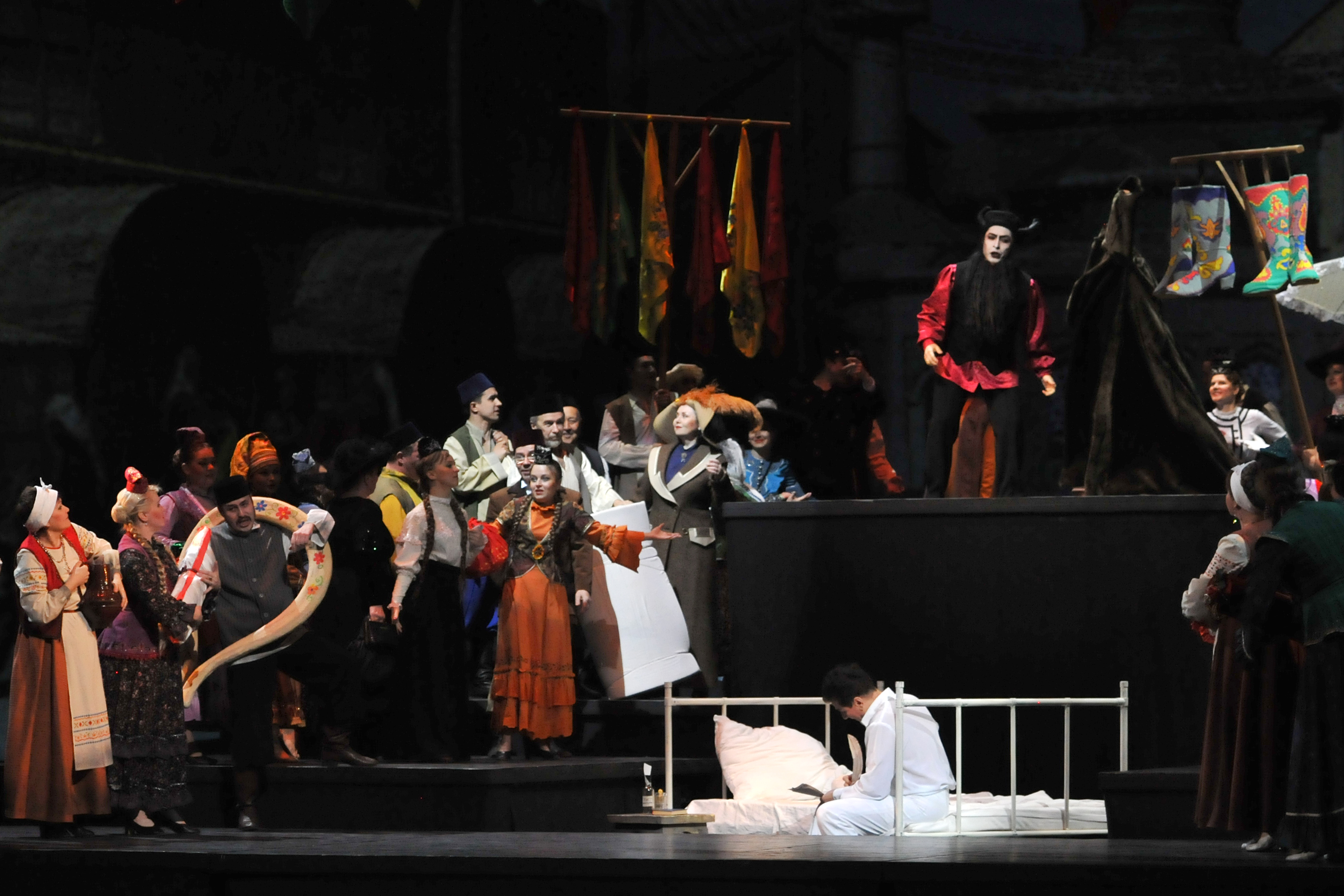
The Poet's Love

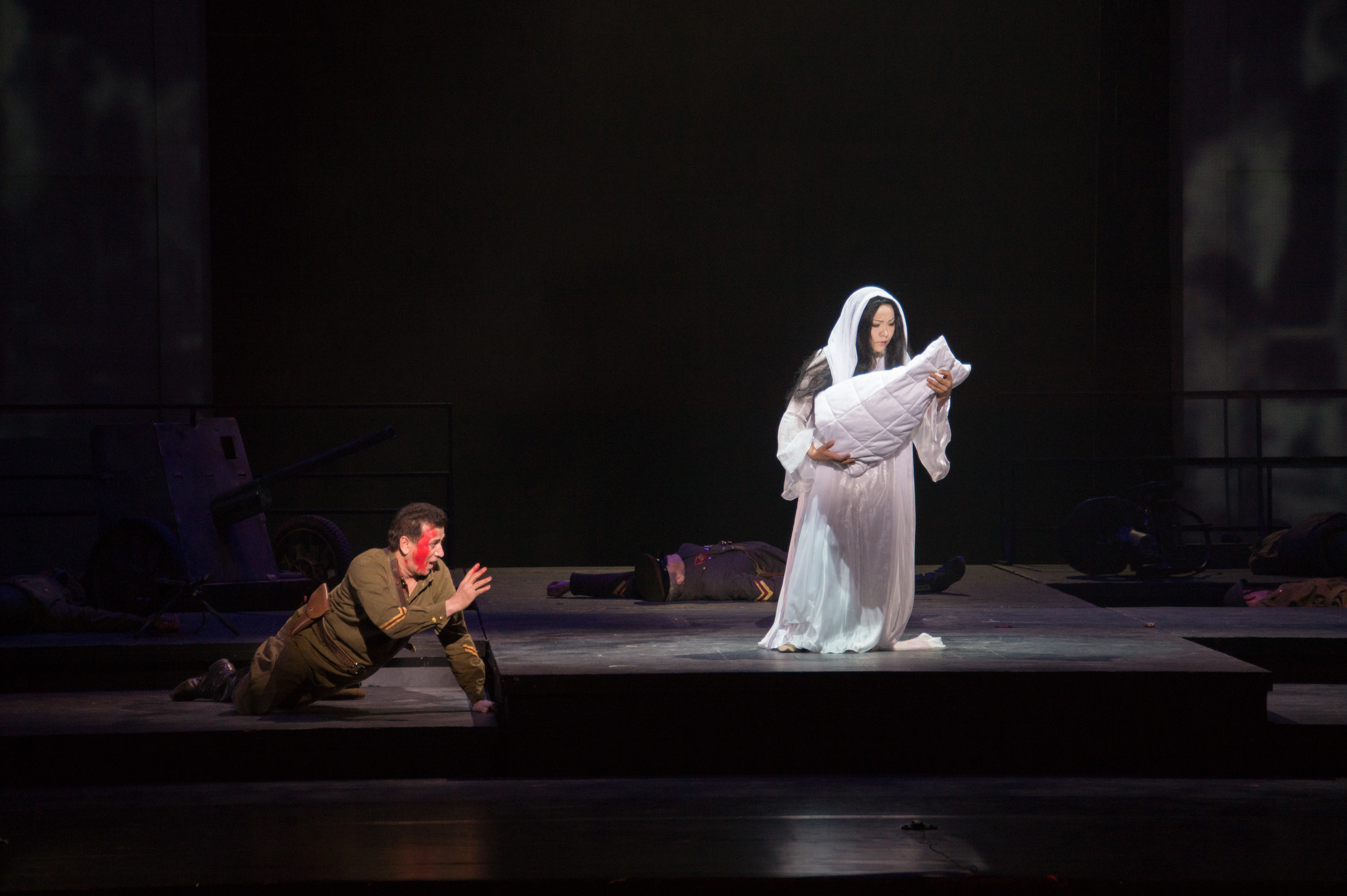
Jalil

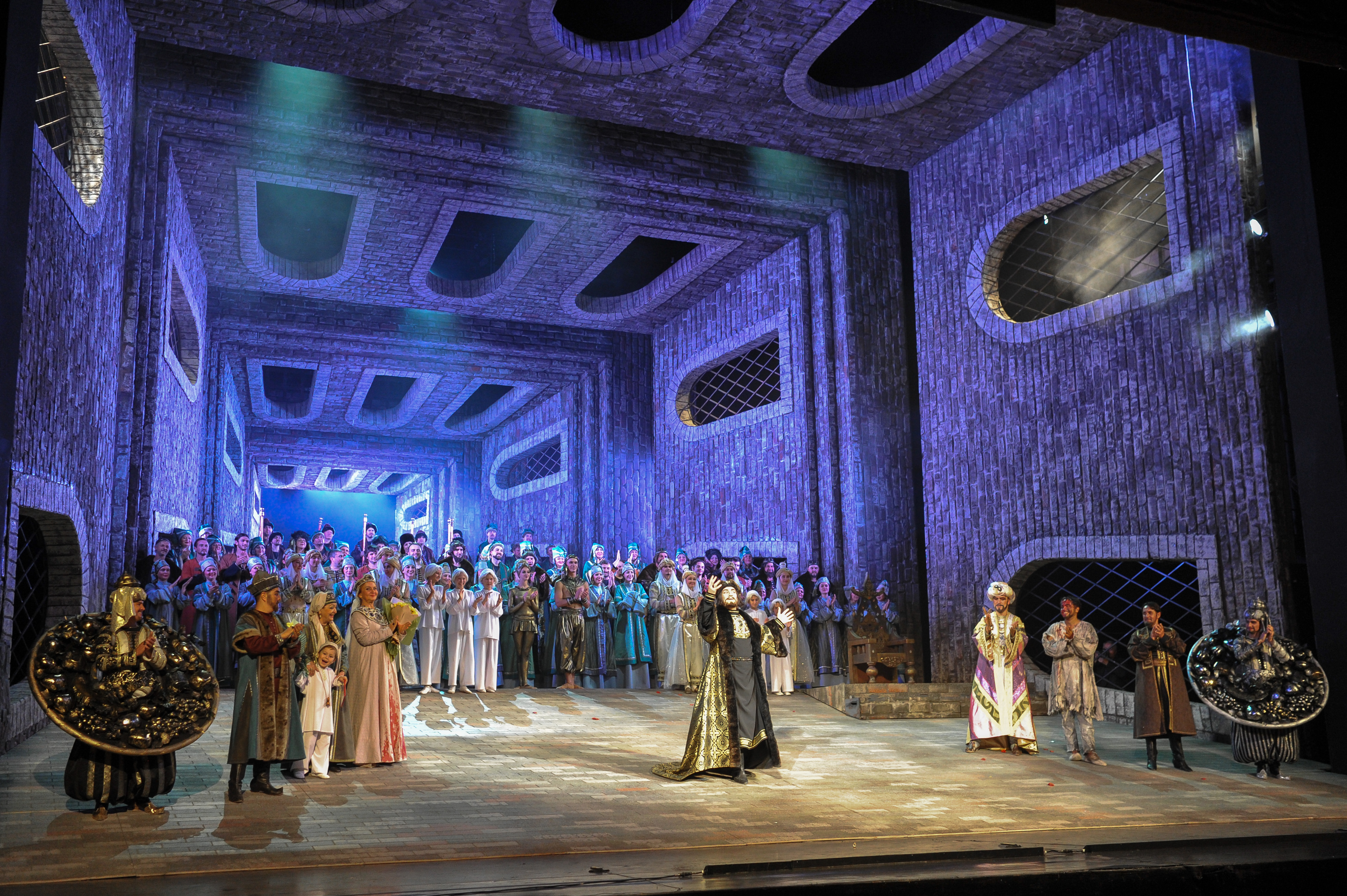
Syuyumbike

=== Repertoire ===
Agadi's singing voice is a lyric-dramatic tenor. According to critics, his exceptionally wide vocal range and ability to reach high notes and produce a finely controlled sound in any register are combined with genuine acting talent. He sings virtually the entire heroic-tenor repertoire, with the exception of works by Richard Wagner.

His roles include Lensky (Eugene Onegin); Vaudémont (Iolanta by Pyotr Tchaikovsky); Bayan (Ruslan and Lyudmila by Mikhail Glinka); Mozart (Mozart and Salieri by Nikolai Rimsky-Korsakov); the Young Gypsy (Aleko by Sergei Rachmaninoff); Don Antonio (Betrothal in a Monastery by Sergei Prokofiev); Count Almaviva (The Barber of Seville by Gioachino Rossini); Faust (Faust by Charles Gounod); Alfred (Die Fledermaus by Johann Strauss); Don José (Carmen by Georges Bizet); Nemorino (The Elixir of Love); Edgardo Ravenswood (Lucia di Lammermoor by Gaetano Donizetti); Don Carlos (Don Carlos); Radamès (Aida); Alfredo Germont (La traviata); Don Alvaro (La forza del destino); the Duke of Mantua (Rigoletto); Gabriele Adorno (Simon Boccanegra); Manrico (Il trovatore by Giuseppe Verdi); Vassili (Siberia by Umberto Giordano); Maurice of Saxony (Adriana Lecouvreur by Francesco Cilea); Arlecchino and Canio (Pagliacci by Ruggero Leoncavallo); Turiddu (Cavalleria rusticana by Pietro Mascagni); Rodolfo (La bohème); Pinkerton (Madama Butterfly); Mario Cavaradossi (Tosca); Calaf (Turandot); Dick Johnson (La fanciulla del West); Chevalier des Grieux (Manon Lescaut by Giacomo Puccini); Don Ottavio (Don Giovanni by Wolfgang Amadeus Mozart); Paco (La vida breve by Manuel de Falla); Jik (Altynchech); Musa Jalil (Jalil by Nazib Zhiganov); Gabdulla Tukay (The Poet's Love); Ivan the Terrible (Syuyumbike by Rezeda Akhiyarova); and tenor parts in Ludwig van Beethoven's Missa solemnis, Giuseppe Verdi's Requiem, Gustav Mahler's Symphony No. 8 and The Song of the Earth, and Sergei Rachmaninoff's The Bells.

A certain amount of time is needed to learn a role, enter into the character, and understand the actions of your hero. The hardest thing is learning something new and unexplored… While singing, I am in the role: if there is joy, at that moment I rejoice; if there is suffering, the suffering must be shown powerfully… When you are in good form and your voice is rested, you feel that you enjoy singing. Overall, of course, it is a pleasure. The audience should not see that an actor is out of form, that it is difficult for him to sing, or that the character is not working, and so on. The work remains in rehearsal; the performance itself must already bring joy and optimism. And when the audience shouts "Bravo", it gives an artist tremendous inspiration.

— Ahmed Agadi, from an interview.

== Awards and titles ==
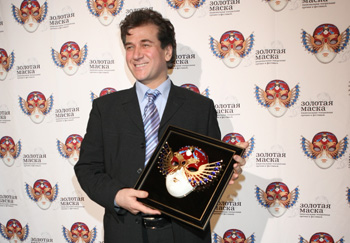
With the Golden Mask award, 2008

- Order of Duslyk (2025, Tatarstan) – "for fruitful cooperation with the Republic of Tatarstan and for services to the development of culture and art".
- Honorary title of Honored Artist of the Russian Federation (1999) – "for a major contribution to the development of musical art".
- Honorary title of People's Artist of the Republic of Tatarstan (2001).
- Gabdulla Tukay State Prize of the Republic of Tatarstan (2008) – "for performing the leading role in the opera The Poet's Love as a member of the creative team of the Musa Jalil Tatar State Academic Opera and Ballet Theatre".
- Golden Mask Award in the 'Male Role' category of the opera competition (2008) – "for the role of Tukay in the opera The Poet's Love, Opera and Ballet Theatre, Kazan".

== Personal life ==
His wife, Irina Sedova, is a graduate of the Gnessin Institute, a composer, art historian, television presenter, and Honored Worker of Culture of the Russian Federation (2013). Their son, Artyom, is a student at Bauman Moscow State Technical University. Agadi enjoys dancing, drawing, and sculpting, and practices figure skating and swimming.
