= Nolan Williams Jr. =

American composer (born 1969)

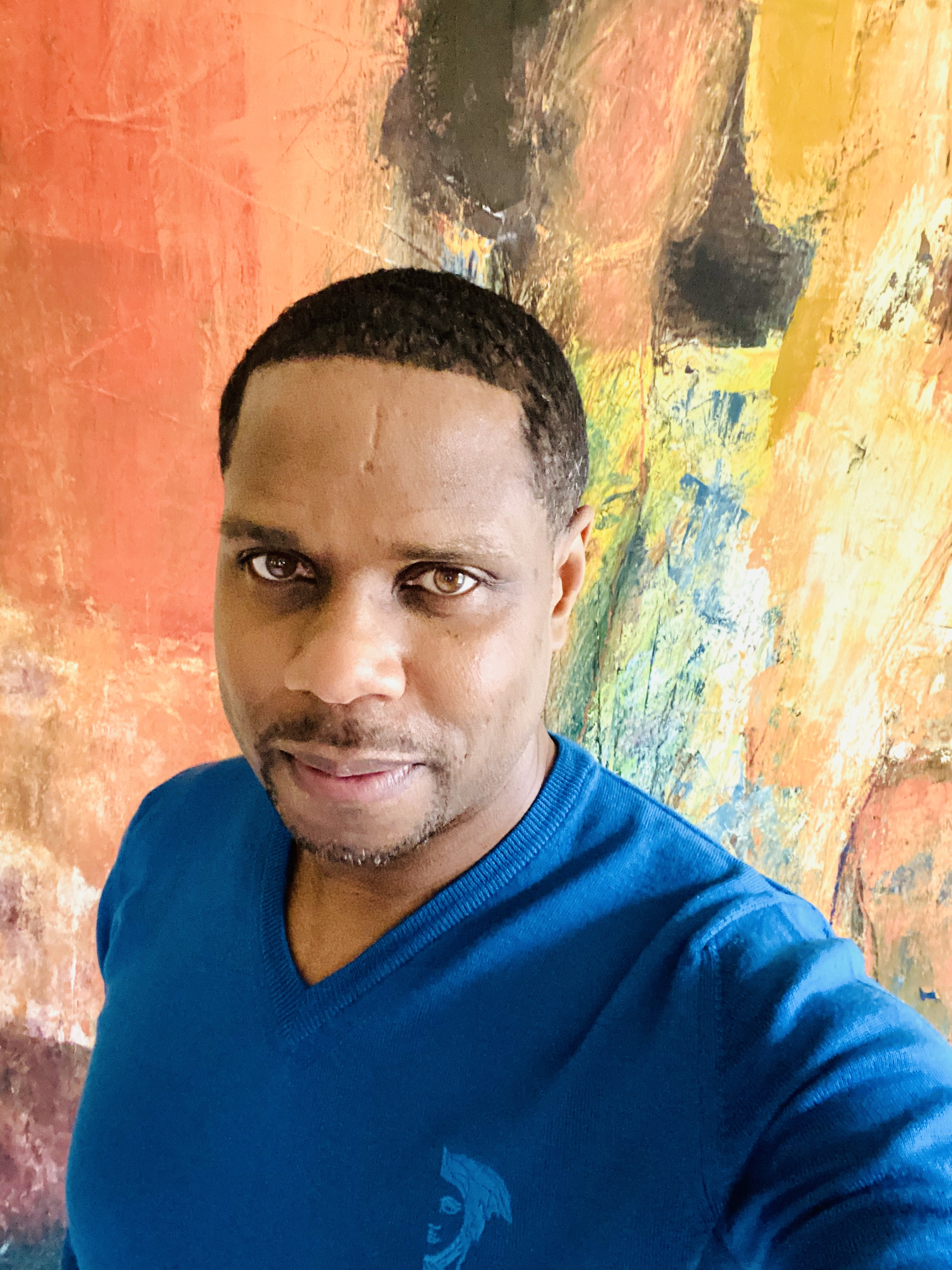
- Williams in 2020
- Born: March 1969 (age 57); Los Angeles, CA
- Education: Oberlin College
- Occupations: Composer, producer, music director

Nolan E. Williams Jr. (born March 1969) is an American composer, musicologist, and producer. He was an editor of the African American Heritage Hymnal.

== Early life and education ==
Williams grew up the son, grandson and great-grandson of Baptist ministers. At the age of 4, he heard the song Lean on Me played by the choir at his father's church. After the service, he asked one of the musicians to play the song for him again on the piano. At home, Williams went to the family's piano and, with no formal lessons, he sounded out the notes until he could play the song himself. Williams' first piano teacher was his great-aunt Daisy Marie Young.

Williams attended St. John's College High School in Washington, D.C. In 1990 he received a B.A. in music (piano performance) from Oberlin College, and in 1993 he received a Master of Divinity degree in theology from Howard University.

== Book publications ==
As a musicologist, Williams is best known as the Music Editor of the African American Heritage Hymnal, which he began work on in 1993. Working with co-editor Dr. Delores Carpenter, pastor of Michigan Park Christian Church in Washington, D.C., the hymnal took nine years to compile. The 2001 publication included 575 hymnals, spirituals and gospel songs. Noted musicologist, Dr. Wyatt Tee Walker, wrote in the book's foreword that the publication was "the most important addition to Protestant hymnody within the past century." Williams created new arrangements for 92 songs in the book. African American Heritage Hymnal has sold more than 500,000 copies worldwide.

In 1995, Williams' commentary on the Book of Habakkuk was included in the collection Many Voices: Multicultural Responses to the Minor Prophets written by Howard University School of Divinity students.

== NEWorks Productions ==
Much of Williams’ musical career has been conducted under the umbrella of NEWorks Productions, an arts programming and music production organization that he founded in 2003. He is also the music director of NEWorks Voices of America [NVoA], formerly called NEWorks’ Voices of Inspiration choir, a choral aggregation specializing in African-American Sacred Music. Since 2007, the choir has performed at a variety of nationally televised events, with multiple performances at the White House, including the National Christmas Tree Lighting in 2013.

== Selected works and performances ==
Williams has composed, arranged or played music for dozens of albums in the gospel and jazz genres, including albums by Ed Wiley, Jr., Lamar Campbell, and Regina Belle. In 2008 he released InSpiration, an original album of worship music.

In 2014, a recording of We Shall Overcome arranged by Williams and featuring mezzo-soprano Denyce Graves was among several works of art, including the poem A Brave and Startling Truth by Maya Angelou, were sent to space on the first test flight of the spacecraft Orion.

In 2017, Williams premiered Hold Fast to Dreams, a commissioned work honoring the legacy of Philadelphia native and NASA astronaut Col. Guion S. Bluford Jr., inspired by the Langston Hughes poem, Dreams.

In July 2018, Williams led a group of local choirs in performing the National Anthem at the 2018 Major League Baseball All Star Game at Nationals Park in Washington, D.C.

In celebration of composer Leonard Bernstein's 100 birthday, Williams commissioned the re-working of Leonard Bernstein's Mass by four Philadelphia composers – Jay Fluellen, Ruth Naomi Floyd, Rollo Dilworth, and Evelyn Simpson. Williams tasked them to “collectively write a new version that expresses their faith or crisis of faith”. The new piece premiered at Philadelphia's Monumental Baptist Church in August 2018.

Williams has served as music producer for Georgetown University’s annual “Let Freedom Ring” celebration, a Washington, D.C. concert honoring Martin Luther King Jr. The 2026 program was headlined by Common. For the program, Williams wrote “Just Like Selma,” a piece inspired by King’s statement that “the arc of the moral universe is long, but it bends toward justice.”

== Theatrical productions ==
Year	Performance	Role	Notes
2022	Grace: A New Musical Feast	Williams conceived and composed. Book co-written by Williams and Nikkole Salter. Robert Berry Fleming, director.	African American culinary traditions told through one family's uncertain challenge to keep their family restaurant. Music includes jazz, R&B and ballads. World premiere at Ford's Theatre, Washington, D.C., running March 19 to May 14, 2022. The production received multiple 2022 BroadwayWorld Washington, DC Awards, including Best Musical and Best Music Direction & Orchestra Performance for Williams.
2019	Stirring the Waters Across America	Conceived by Williams. Eric Ruffin, director. Choreography by Kiana Ebone'.	Key events from the Civil Rights Movement (1954-1968) are highlighted. The piece was performed at the REACH at the Kennedy Center and included 12 songs.
2019	Devine Hamer Gray: A New American Musical (in development)	Williams is composer and playwright.	Musical about Annie Devine, Fannie Lou Hamer, and Victoria Jackson Gray and the Mississippi Freedom Democratic Party they helped to found. A staged reading was performed in Washington, D.C., in 2019.
2014	Go, Tell It!	Conceived and directed by Williams.	Performed at the Lincoln Theatre, Washington, D.C., with Bebe Winans and the late gospel singer Lecresia Campbell.
2013	Christmas Gift!	Conceived and directed by Williams. Co-directed by Raquis Petree. Choreographed by Torens Johnson and Jakari Sherman.	Teenager Zawadi Wise and her family celebrate Christmas Gift, a holiday gift exchange tradition in the African American community. Premiered at The Clarice, University of Maryland-College Park. Williams was first inspired by Charlemae Rollins's 1963 anthology, Christmas Gif’: An Anthology of Christmas Poems, Songs, and Stories.
