= Evelyn Simpson Curenton =

American musician (born 1953)

Evelyn Simpson Curenton (born 1953) is an American composer, pianist, organist, and vocalist.

== Early life and education ==
Simpson Curenton was a child prodigy. She played the piano at the age of two. She began piano lessons at age five. When she was seven years old she began to perform with the Singing Simpsons of Philadelphia, a family group, After graduating from Germantown High School she earned a B.M., Music Education and Voice from Temple University.

== Career ==
She has been commissioned to write works for the American Guild of Organists, George Shirley, Duke Ellington, and her sisters Joy Simpson and Marietta Simpson; arranged music for the Carnegie Hall Concert of Spirituals for Kathleen Battle, Jessye Norman, and the Porgy and Bess Chorus of the New York Metropolitan Opera, and has performed with musical organizations such as the Philadelphia Orchestra, Philadelphia's National Opera Ebony (later renamed Opera North).

Based in the Washington, D.C., area, Curenton is Music Director of the Washington Performing Arts Society's Men and Women of the Gospel and an associate of the Smithsonian Institution. She has given lectures and participated in workshops on early 18th-century black religious music and the music of African-Americans during the Civil Rights era.

In celebration of composer Leonard Bernstein’s 100 birthday, Nolan Williams, Jr. commissioned the re-working of Leonard Bernstein’s Mass by four Philadelphia composers – Simpson, Jay Fluellen, Ruth Naomi Floyd, and Rollo Dilworth. Williams tasked them to “collectively write a new version that expresses their faith or crisis of faith”. The new piece premiered at Philadelphia’s Monumental Baptist Church in August 2018.
