= Mariinsky Theatre =

Theatre in Saint Petersburg, Russia

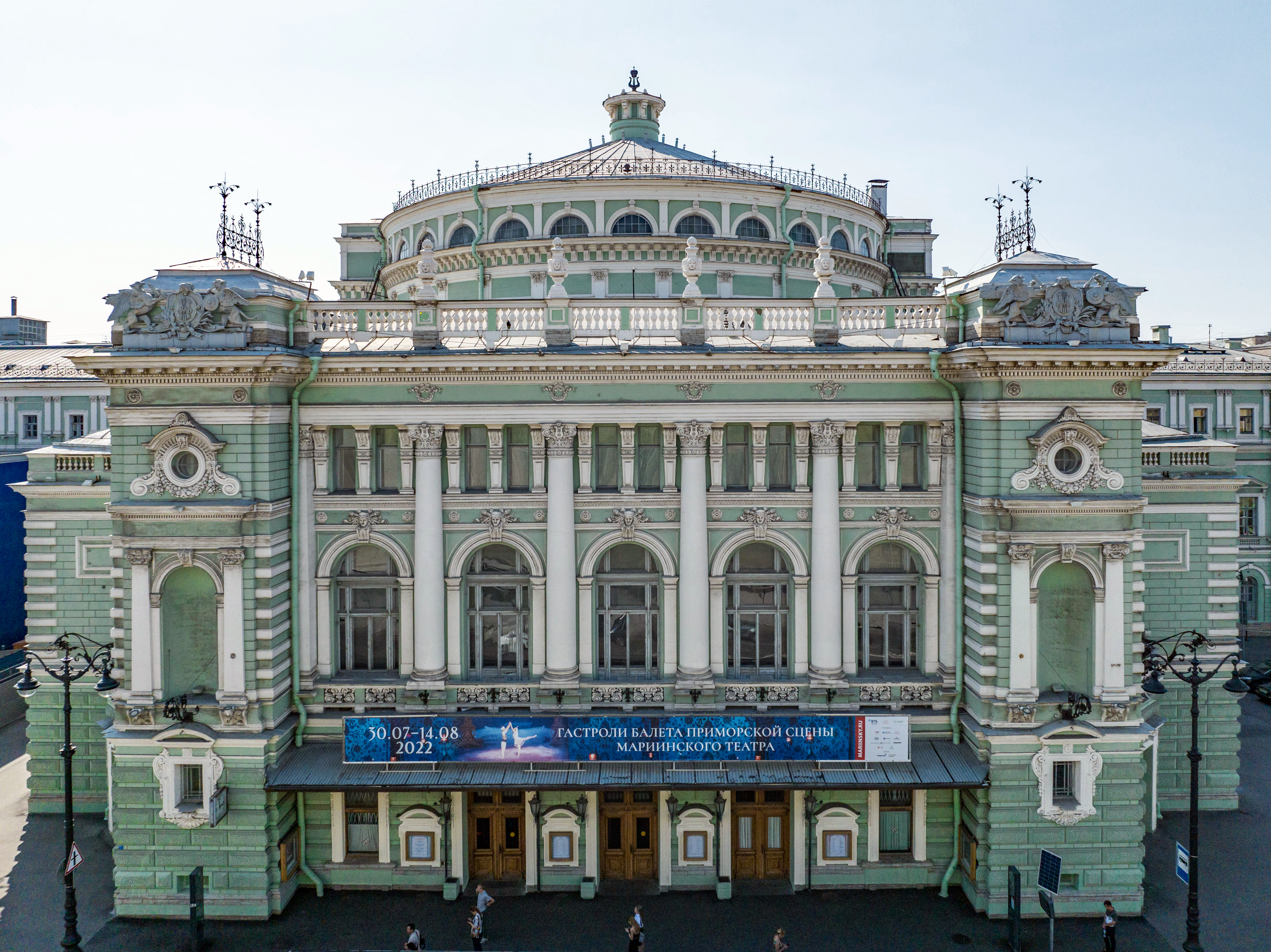
- Mariinsky Theatre, August 2022
- Interactive map of Mariinsky Theatre
- Address: 1 Theatre Square; Saint Petersburg; Russia
- Coordinates: 59°55′32″N 30°17′46″E

Construction
- Opened: 2 October 1860; 165 years ago
- Years active: since 1860
- Architect: Alberto Cavos

Tenants
- Mariinsky Ballet; Mariinsky Opera; Mariinsky Orchestra

Website
- www.mariinsky.ru

The Mariinsky Theatre (Russian: Мариинский театр, romanized: Mariinskiy teatr, also transcribed as Maryinsky or Mariyinsky) is a historic opera house in Saint Petersburg, Russia. Opened in 1860, it became the preeminent music theatre of late 19th-century Russia, where many of the stage masterpieces of Tchaikovsky, Mussorgsky, and Rimsky-Korsakov received their premieres. Through most of the Soviet era, it was known as the Kirov Theatre. Today, the Mariinsky Theatre is home to the Mariinsky Ballet, Mariinsky Opera and Mariinsky Orchestra. After Yuri Temirkanov's retirement in 1988, the conductor Valery Gergiev became the theatre's general director.

== Name ==
The theatre is named after Empress Maria Alexandrovna, wife of Tsar Alexander II. There is a bust of the Empress in the main entrance foyer. The theatre's name has changed throughout its history, reflecting the political climate of the time:

- 1860 – 1920: Imperial Mariinsky Theatre (Russian: Императорский Мариинский театр)
- 1920 – 1924: State Academic Theatre of Opera and Ballet (Russian: Государственный академический театр оперы и балета)
- 1924 – 1935: Leningrad State Academic Theatre of Opera and Ballet (Russian: Ленинградский государственный академический театр оперы и балета)
- 1935 – 1992: Kirov State Academic Theatre of Opera and Ballet (Russian: Государственный академический театр оперы и балета имени С. М. Кирова) (one of numerous places and institutions named or renamed at that time for Sergei Kirov)
- 1992 – present: State Academic Mariinsky Theatre (Russian: Государственный aкадемический Мариинский театр)

Note: The acronym "GATOB" (Gosudarstvennïy Akademicheskiy Teatr Operï i Baleta) is often encountered in historical accounts.

The theatre building is commonly called the Mariinsky Theatre. The companies that operate within it have for brand recognition purposes retained the Kirov name, acquired during the Soviet era to commemorate the assassinated Leningrad Communist Party leader Sergey Kirov (1886–1934).

== Origins ==
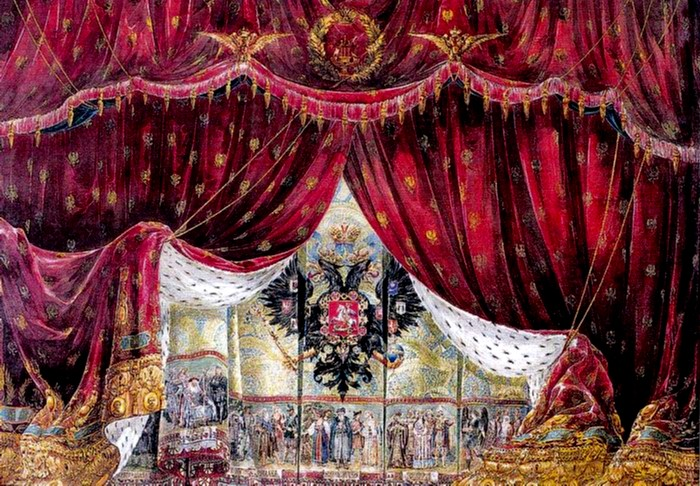
Design for the Imperial-era curtain of the Mariinsky Theatre that existed prior to 1914

The Imperial drama, opera and ballet troupe in Saint Petersburg was established in 1783, at the behest of Catherine the Great, although an Italian ballet troupe had performed at the Russian court since the early 18th century.

A permanent theatre building for the new company of opera and ballet artists was designed by Antonio Rinaldi and opened in 1783. Known as the Imperial Bolshoi Kamenny Theatre, the structure was situated on Carousel Square, which was renamed Theatre Square in honour of the building. Both names – "Kamenny" (Russian word for "stone") and "Bolshoi" (Russian word for "big") – were coined to distinguish it from the wooden Little Theatre. In 1836, the Bolshoi Kamenny Theatre was renovated to a design by Albert Cavos (son of Catterino Cavos, an opera composer), and served as the principal theatre of the Imperial Ballet and opera.

On 29 January 1849, the Equestrian circus (Конный цирк) opened on Theatre Square. This was also the work of the architect Cavos. The building was designed to double as a theatre.

== Leading role ==
The Imperial Mariinsky Theatre and its predecessor, the Bolshoi Kamenny Theatre, hosted the premieres of many of the operas of Mikhail Glinka, Modest Mussorgsky, and Pyotr Ilyich Tchaikovsky. At the behest of the theatre director Ivan Vsevolozhsky, both the Imperial Ballet (ballet arrived at the Mariinsky theater in 1870) and the Imperial Opera were relocated to the Mariinsky Theatre in 1886, as the Bolshoi Kamenny Theatre was considered unsafe.

World premieres given at the house included Mussorgsky's opera Boris Godunov in 1874, Tchaikovsky's operas The Queen of Spades in 1890 and Iolanta in 1892, the revised version of Prokofiev's ballet Romeo and Juliet in 1940, and Khachaturian's ballet Spartacus in 1956. Other notable productions included Rimsky-Korsakov's opera The Golden Cockerel in 1909 and Prokofiev's ballet Cinderella in 1946 (with Natalya Dudinskaya).

The imperial and Soviet theater was the home of numerous theatre directors, impresarios, conductors, and musicians.

Theatre directors: Ivan Vsevolozhsky (Director of Imperial Theatres, 1881 to 1898), Alexander Skibnevsky (1946–1947).

Conductors: Mikhail Zhukov (1932–35), Israel Chudnovsky and others.

Ballet: The ballet school of the Mariinsky Theatre spawned the careers of artists Mathilde Kschessinskaya, Olga Preobrajenskaya, Anna Pavlova, Tamara Karsavina, Vaslav Nijinsky, and George Balanchine, students of the Imperial Ballet School and style, and, under and after the teachings of Agrippina Vaganova, artists Marina Semyonova, Galina Ulanova, Rudolf Nureyev, Natalia Makarova, Mikhail Baryshnikov, Irina Kolpakova, Galina Mezentseva, Altynai Asylmuratova, as well as more recent dancers of renown Ulyana Lopatkina, Diana Vishneva, and Svetlana Zakharova, students of the school as now named, the Vaganova Academy of Russian Ballet.

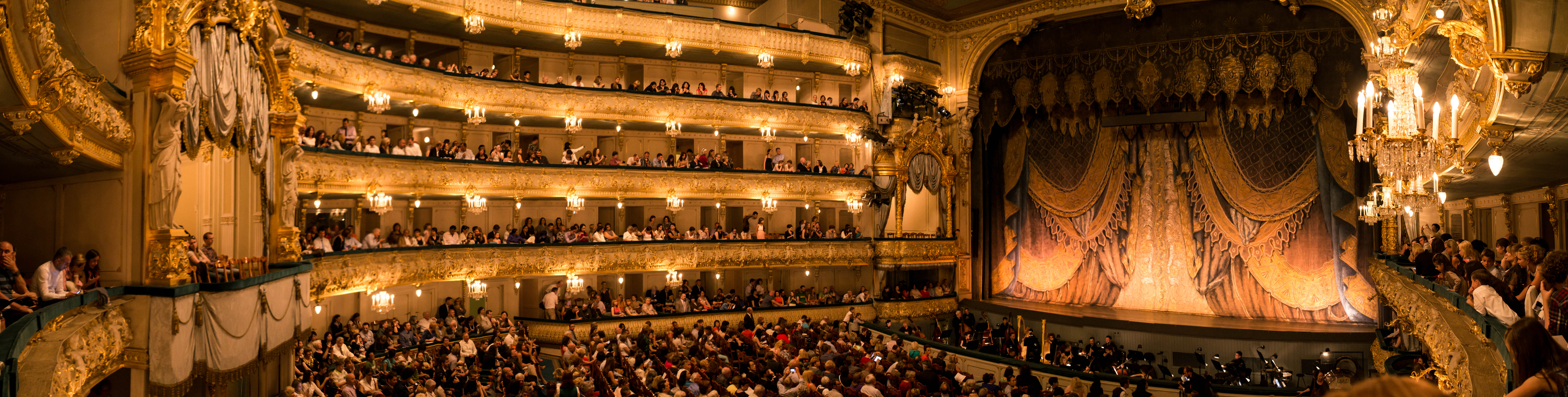
Interior

Guest Soloist: Reza Fekri

== Mariinsky Theatre today ==
Although this box was not officially referred to as the "Tsar's Box" (that name was given to the box in the center of the auditorium), this box is where the Emperor and his family always sat when attending performances at the theatre.

Under Yuri Temirkanov, Principal Conductor from 1976 to 1988, the Opera Company continued to stage innovative productions of both modern and classic Russian operas.

In April 2022, resident conductor Gavriel Heine, a protégé of Gergiev, resigned from the theater in part because of the 2022 Russian invasion of Ukraine.

=== Mariinsky Theatre Concert Hall ===
The nearby Mariinsky Theatre Concert Hall, designed by French architect, Xavier Fabre, opened in spring 2007.

== Mariinsky Theatre Second Stage ==
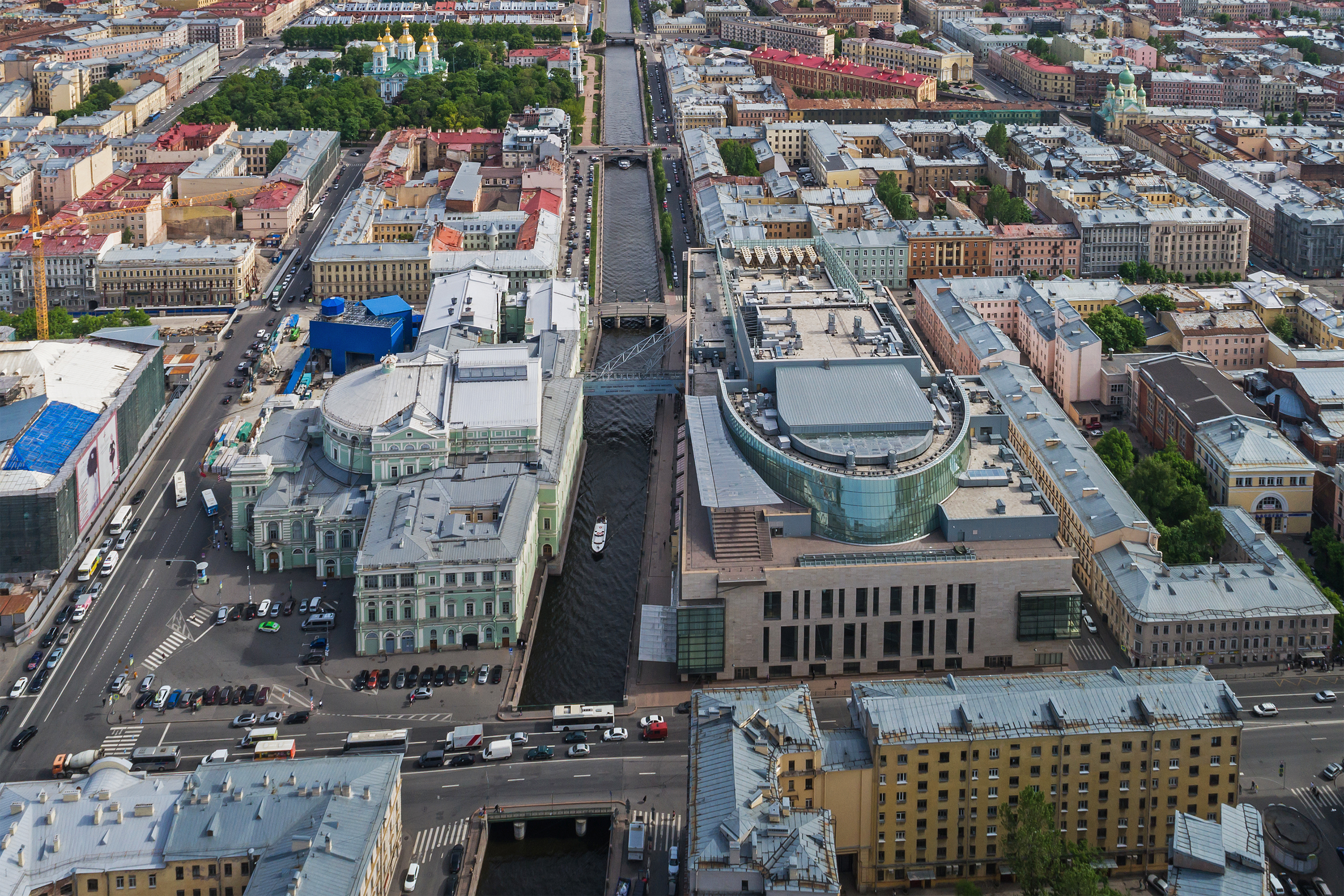
The Second Stage is to the right of the canal

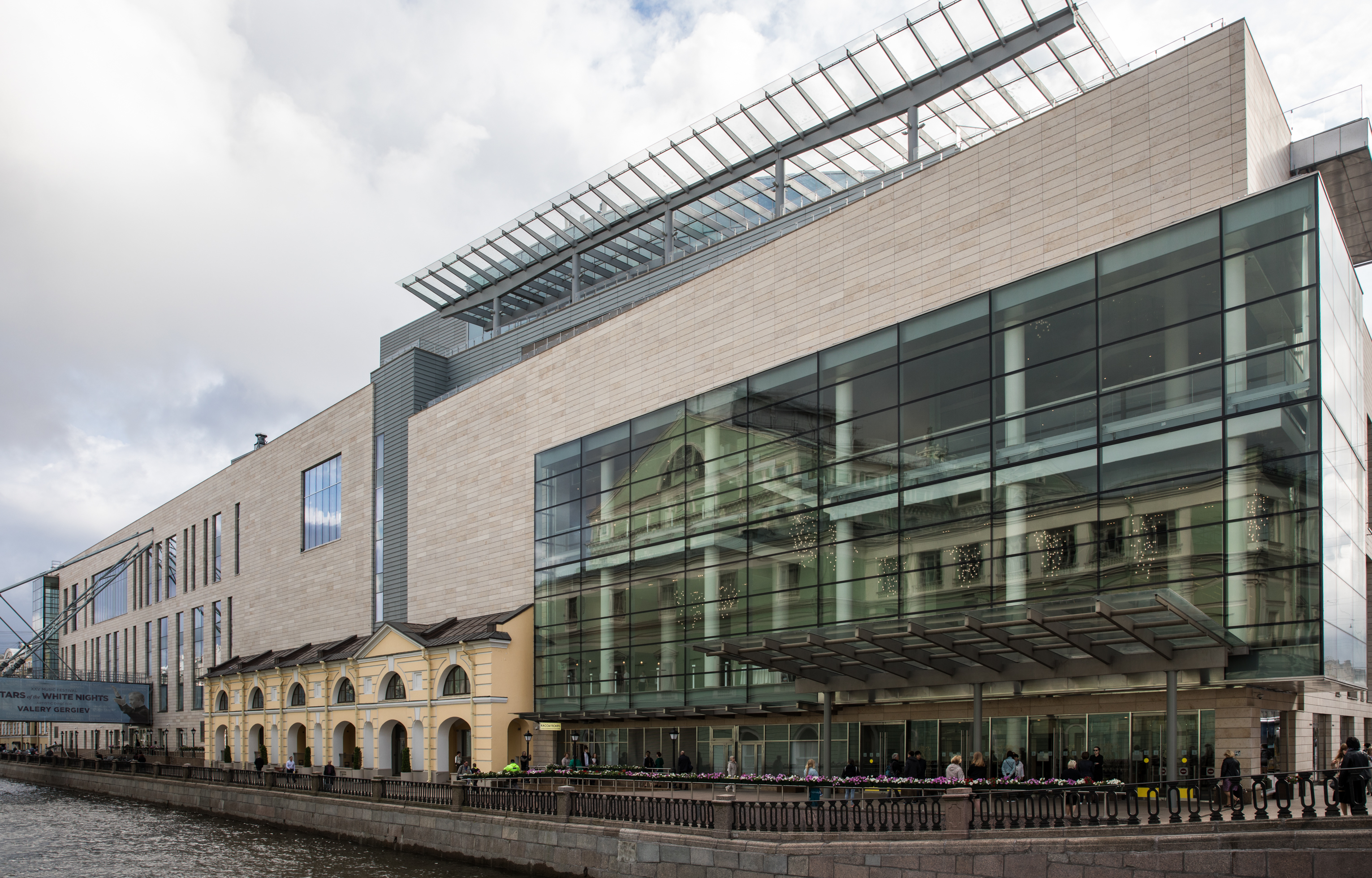
The Second Stage

The Canadian firm Diamond and Schmitt Architects, along with its local partner KB ViPS Architects, designed a new building, then to be named The Second Stage, with 1,830 seats, which would complement the existing Mariinsky. Construction began in 2003, following a different design by French architect Jean Nouvel that was halted at the sub-basement level. The new design team took over in 2009. The completion of Mariinsky II was predicted to result in Saint Petersburg's equivalent of New York City's Lincoln Center.

Construction was completed in May 2013, at a price of 500 million euros.

== Mariinsky Branch Theaters ==
The Mariinsky Theatre maintains regional stages in Vladivostok (established 2016) and Vladikavkaz (added 2017), extending its cultural reach across Russia.

== Mariinsky record label ==
In 2009, the Mariinsky Theatre launched its own record label, managed by the same team that run the LSO Live label in London.

Among the titles that have been released are:

Rachmaninov: Piano Concerto No 3 / Rhapsody on a Theme of Paganini performed by Denis Matsuev, conducted by Valery Gergiev Mariinsky Label Website
Shchedrin: The Enchanted Wanderer conducted by Valery Gergiev Mariinsky Label Website
Shostakovich: The Nose conducted by Valery Gergiev Mariinsky Label Website
Shostakovich: Symphonies Nos 1 & 15 conducted by Valery Gergiev Mariinsky Label Website
Stravinsky: Oedipus Rex / Les Noces conducted by Valery Gergiev Mariinsky Label Website
Tchaikovsky: 1812, Moscow Cantata, Marche Slave conducted by Valery Gergiev Mariinsky Label Website

== Premieres ==
- The Ring ballet (2007)

== See also ==
- Ahmed Agadi, tenor operatic singer at the Mariinsky Theatre
