= The Ring (ballet) =

- Choreographer: Alexei Miroshnichenko
- Music: 2H Company
- Premiere: April, 2007; Mariinsky Theatre

The Ring (Russian: Ринг) is a ballet staged by choreographer Alexei Miroshnichenko and the musical group 2H Company (Ilya Baramia, Alexander Zaitsev and Mikhail Fenichev) with the participation of beatboxer Sergei Galunenko. The premiere took place in April 2007 at the Mariinsky Theatre in St. Petersburg. Many publications called The Ring the world's first rap ballet. The choreographer and musicians were awarded the Sobaka.ru TOP 50 award.

== History of creation ==
At the very end of 2006, choreographer A. Miroshnichenko came to the studio of “Christmas Tree Toys” / YOI (the duet of I. Baramia and A. Zaitsev) and asked him to write music for his new production, despite the musicians’ lack of musical education (according to Zaitsev, the group “I didn’t know the notes at all”). Pavel Gershenzon, assistant director of the Mariinsky Theater ballet troupe, recalled that the idea was discussed in a coffee shop.

=== Choreography ===
The 32-year-old St. Petersburg choreographer Alexey Grigorievich Miroshnichenko was responsible for the idea, choreography and production; rehearsals took place at the Perm Academic Opera and Ballet Theater named after P. I. Tchaikovsky. Alexey also often visited the Yolochny studio and danced there to simplify the work of musicians who were not previously familiar with the art of ballet.

The Ring was mentioned in a short story on Channel One. Anton Pimonov, soloist of the Mariinsky Theater ballet, in an interview with Channel One, gave an answer to skeptics regarding the combination of ballet and hip-hop: “Why not? . . . It seems to me that this is absolutely normal and should work”.

=== Music ===
The musical accompaniment in the form of a phonogram was made by the IDM hip-hop group 2H Company, which had two albums: Psychosurgeons (2004) and The Art of AK-47 Care (2007); instrumental compositions were written by Ilya Baramia and Alexander Zaitsev, the lyrics were written by vocalist Mikhail Fenichev. Beatboxing was performed by Sergey Galunenko, known under the pseudonym Galun.

Ilya Baramia described the process of creating the ballet this way: “Four months of very intense, hard work. Choreographer - he came here, as it were. He said that “this is not allowed, this is necessary, throw this out, under no circumstances!” As if that is... I don't know, he danced, showed how it should all be, what he came up with here”. In a 2021 podcast, Ilya said that changes were made for the production in Perm, in particular for the referee character.

Mikhail Fenichev commented on his participation in the project: “I still can’t somehow fully understand what happened. Ballet, in fact, for me is the very last thing in life that I would probably be interested in, but since it was offered... But for some reason I didn’t want to refuse”. Fenichev was so pleased with his work with this ballet troupe that he was ready to continue cooperation or even soon compose a rap opera.

Subsequently, the song “Gloomy Absurdity” from the ballet was published on the Internet. The text by Mikhail Fenichev, “16th floor”, was originally planned for the ballet, but was not used in it, but later it was used in the album SBPC Orchestra by the group "The Biggest Prime Number," which was released in November 2008 by the label Bullfinches.

== Production ==
The premiere of The Ring took place in April 2007 at the St. Petersburg Mariinsky Theatre after Apollo by Igor Stravinsky. The Ring was shown at the Mariinsky Theatre more times, once at the V. F. Komissarzhevskaya Academic Drama Theater, and twice at the Baden-Baden Theatre.

== See also ==
- Russian hip hop
- Husky (rapper)
- Oxxxymiron
