= Novosibirsk Youth Symphony Orchestra =

The Novosibirsk Youth Symphony Orchestra was founded in 1996. The orchestra includes more than 80 young musicians, aged between 10 and 20 years. The base of the orchestra consists of pupils of the Novosibirsk Specialized Music School (college).

Among the members of the orchestra there are many international, all-Russian, and regional competitions. Vladislav Yankovsky the Honored Artist of Russia, the main conductor-leader of the orchestra since the beginning. The professional help for the young musicians of the Academic symphony orchestra of the Novosibirsk State Philarmonic Society and its main conductor, People's artist of USSR, professor Arnold Katz, is very important.

The repertoire of the orchestra includes the following compositions: W. A. Mozart Symphony №41 "Jupiter" and "Requiem", L. Beethoven Symphony №1, F. Schubert Symphony №8 "Unfinished". D. Shostakovich Symphony №9, E. Grieg Concerto for piano with the orchestra, M. Mussorgsky's Night on Bald Mountain, P. Tchaikovsky concerts for piano and violin with the orchestra and Overture-fantasy "Romeo and Juliet", overtures by G. Rossini, compositions by A. Vivaldi, T. Albinoni, G. Bizet, C. Saint-Saëns, R. Wagner, M. Glinka, A. Dvořák and other composers. Concerts of the orchestra are a constant success with the public.
