= Rollo Dilworth =

American composer, conductor, educator (born 1970)

Rollo A. Dilworth (born September 23, 1970) is an American choral composer, arranger, conductor, and music educator from St. Louis, Missouri.

== Education ==
Dilworth, as a young boy, was impassioned by singing experiences in his school and church choirs. At the age of 11, he began experimenting with the music he was given by testing out alternate pitches and rhythms. His elementary music teacher fostered this curiosity by realizing his work. This period marked the beginning of his love for arranging music. At this time, he also began studying music theory and piano. During his high school years, he quickly discovered that he wanted to pursue music as a career.

To fulfill his ambitions, Dilworth continued his education at Case Western Reserve in Cleveland, Ohio. There, he continued his study of voice and piano and received a Bachelor of Music degree in Music Education. He spent a year teaching elementary school music full-time while also attending the University of Missouri-St. Louis to complete a master's degree in secondary education. Throughout the program, Dilworth's long-time musical idol, Robert Ray, taught him composition and arranging skills. After completing the master's degree in 1994, Dilworth spent another year teaching elementary music. He then continued on to receive a DMA in conducting, this time studying with Robert Harris.

== Career ==
Dilworth served as the director of the music education and choral programs at North Park University in Chicago, Illinois from 1996 to 2009. In 1998, both Colla Voce and Hal Leonard contacted Dilworth, offering him publishing contracts. Since then, Dilworth has had over 150 works published. He has contributed to the Choir Builders series of choral textbooks and to the music magazine Music Express, both of which are published by Hal Leonard. In 2003, he was the recipient of North Park University's Zenos Hawkinson Award for Teaching Excellence and Campus Leadership. After 2009, Dilworth accepted a position as a professor of music at Temple University in Pennsylvania. He is the chair of the Music Education and Music Therapy department there. In 2017, he was honored with the Temple University Faculty Award for Research and Creative Achievement. Dilworth has, through his compositional and educational endeavors, become an active participant in the domestic and international worlds of music.

In celebration of composer Leonard Bernstein's 100 birthday, Nolan Williams Jr. commissioned the re-working of Leonard Bernstein's Mass by four Philadelphia composers – Dilworth, Jay Fluellen, Ruth Naomi Floyd, and Evelyn Simpson. Williams tasked them to "collectively write a new version that expresses their faith or crisis of faith". The new piece premiered at Philadelphia's Monumental Baptist Church in August 2018.

== Style and influence ==
Both classical music and African-American folk music have influenced Dilworth's musical development and style. He recognizes Beethoven and Chopin as beloved classical icons in his life, but his compositional style is largely influenced by Gospel and Spiritual composers such as Robert Ray and Moses Hogan. Dilworth also draws inspiration from African-American literary tradition. He has a particular affinity for the poetry of Langston Hughes and Paul Laurence Dunbar, a love which has moved him to compose settings of their texts.

== Memberships ==
- American Choral Directors Association (ACDA)
- American Society of Composers, Authors, and Publishers (ASCAP)
- Chorus America
- National Association for Music Education (NAfME)
- National Association of Negro Musicians (NANM)

== Works ==
=== Selected compositions and arrangements ===
SATB compositions

- "America, the Dream"
- "Freedom Train"
- "Jordan's Angels"
- "Let Peace and Love Shine Through"
- "Take me to the Water"
- "When Dreams Take Flight"
- "A Change Has Come"

SATB arrangements

- "I Sing Because I'm Happy" (adapted from "His Eye Is on the Sparrow")
- "Jesus, What a Wonderful Child"
- "Let Me Fly"
- "Little David, Play on Your Harp"
- "Oh! What a Beautiful City"

=== Selected discography ===
- Good News (2008)
  - "No Rocks-A-Cryin'"
  - "Keep On Travelin'"
  - "Take Me to The Water"
  - "Ain't A That Good News"
  - "Jeremiah's Fire!"
  - "Swinging' Sweet Chariot"
  - "I Want Jesus to Walk with Me"
  - "How Can I Keep from Singing?"
  - "Witness for My Lord"
  - "De Gospel Train"
  - "Soon and Very Soon"
  - "Walk in Jerusalem"
  - "Ain't A That Good News" (Instrumental)

=== Books and articles ===
- Choir Builders: Fundamental Vocal Techniques for Classroom and General Use (2006)
- Choir Builders for Growing Voices (2010)
- Choir Builders for Growing Voices 2 (2014)
- "Working with Male Adolescent Voices in the Choral Rehearsal: A Survey of Research-based Strategies", Choral Journal, vol. 52, no. 9 (April 2012), 23–33. (2012)
