= G.L.O.S.S. =

Trans-feminist hardcore punk

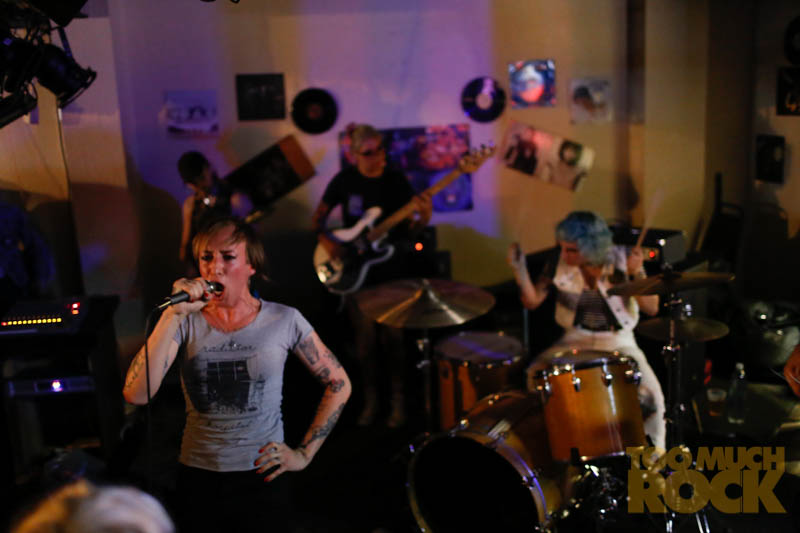
- G.L.O.S.S. in 2015

Background information
- Origin: Olympia Washington, United States
- Genres: Hardcore punk, queercore, D-beat
- Years active: 2014–2016
- Labels: Total Negativity, Nervous Nelly
- Members: Sadie "Switchblade" Smith; Corey Evans; Jake Bison; Tannrr Hainsworth; Julaya Antolin
- Website: girlslivingoutsidesocietysshit.bandcamp.com

G.L.O.S.S. (Girls Living Outside Society's Shit) was a trans-feminist hardcore punk band based out of Olympia, Washington. The group formed in 2014 and consisted of members Corey Evans (drums), Sadie "Switchblade" Smith (vocals), Jake Bison (guitar), Tannrr Hainsworth (guitar), and Julaya Antolin (bass guitar).

== Biography ==
=== Formation and previous bands ===
In 2011, Bison and Smith formed a punk band called Peeple Watchin'. Not long after forming the band, the two moved from Boston, Massachusetts to Olympia, Washington. Smith cited personal reasons for the move: to slow her life down, and to focus on sobriety and her emotional life. Bison expressed a desire to form a new band with Smith, but because of her desire to focus on her personal life, she was wary of committing to such a project. Smith's wariness subsided after she and Jake met the other members of the band and people in the Olympia scene who shared similar interests and a passion for hardcore punk.

=== Turning down Epitaph Records and breakup ===
In the summer of 2016 G.L.O.S.S. was offered a record deal by the well-known punk rock label Epitaph Records. Smith expressed on her Instagram account that the band considered taking the $50,000 deal because it would present them with an opportunity to donate a percentage of the money to social and economic causes that the band supports, such as Black Lives Matter, helping the homeless, disabled queers, etc. However, because of Epitaph's affiliation and distribution deal with Warner Bros., the band decided to turn down the offer because they did not want to contribute financially to a large corporation. The band had so far self-released their records and cassettes on their guitarist's label, Total Negativity, and felt it was better to keep things that way.

Soon after announcing that they would not be signing a deal with Epitaph Records, the band gave a statement to popular punk and hardcore zine Maximum Rock and Roll stating that they had decided to end the band. The reason for the breakup revolved around the mental and physical stress that being in a touring band involves, and the toll this has taken on their home lives, community involvement, and personal growth. They felt that the large amount of visibility and attention the band had gained made it difficult for them to stay "honest and inward". The statement also explained that the buzz around the band and the polarizing effect that it had on people was beginning to overshadow the band itself, and that this was not a healthy position for the band and its members to be in. All the members in G.L.O.S.S. remain friends, and the breakup was a mutual decision between all the members. The band's records will remain in print after the breakup. G.L.O.S.S. will be donating all the money they make on Bandcamp post-breakup to a homeless shelter in Olympia, Washington called the Interfaiths Works Emergency Overnight Shelter.

== Influences and lyrical content ==
Smith cites Massachusetts hardcore punk staples Bane and Reach the Sky as bands that she felt she had a connection to lyrically, because the "emotional vulnerability" of these bands' lyrics set them apart from many bands within the scene in the early 2000s. She goes on to say that many of the bands at the time were made up of straight, white males from the suburbs. She thought that the lyrical content of most of the bands during this time did not really reflect the issues or opinions of the people on the margins of the hardcore punk scene and society as a whole, such as people of color, women, transgender people, disabled people, or anyone who identifies as a queer person. Smith explains that G.L.O.S.S. is a reaction towards cisgender people in popular culture, society, pacifism and the hardcore punk scene. G.L.O.S.S.'s lyrics range from police brutality and corruption to being a proud trans person living in today's society.

Smith expressed that she was tired of feeling unwelcome and feeling like she should stick to the back of the room at the largely straight white male dominated hardcore shows that she was attending. In a Maximum Rock and Roll interview, the band talks about how they were tired of seeing the identities of straight white males reflected in a scene that claims to be full of outcasts. In an interview with Rolling Stone Magazine, Bison says that the band is "intentionally antagonistic" and is not interested in fitting into or being "tolerated" by society or any scene. Their intention is to carve out a new space for themselves and the groups they advocate for.

== Members ==
- Sadie "Switchblade" Smith – vocals
- Tannrr Hainsworth – guitars
- Jake Bison – guitars
- Julaya Antolin – bass
- Corey Evans – drums

== Discography ==
- Demo (2015)
- Trans Day of Revenge (2016)
