= Trans Day of Revenge =

TRANS DAY OF REVENGE

EP by G.L.O.S.S.
- Released: June 13, 2016
- Recorded: August 2015
- Studios: Punkall (Olympia, Washington)
- Genre: Hardcore punk; D-beat
- Length: 6:58
- Labels: Total Negativity; Nervous Nelly; PANSY TWIST distro; Sabatoge
- Producer: Joey Seward

G.L.O.S.S. chronology
DEMO (2015)	TRANS DAY OF REVENGE (2016)

Trans Day of Revenge (stylized TRANS DAY OF REVENGE) is the second and final extended play of Olympia, Washington-based punk group G.L.O.S.S. (Girls Living Outside Society's Shit). The album, produced by Joey Seward, was released a day after the 2016 Orlando nightclub shooting, by the Total Negativity, Nervous Nelly, PANSY TWIST distro and Sabatoge labels. The album was noted by many music journalists as "necessary" and "essential" due to its message; the political views expressed are against pacifism, with regard to issues such as state violence, transphobia and respectability politics.

== Composition ==
Lyrically, Trans Day of Revenge strongly criticizes people's pacifism towards state terrorism, hatred towards transgender people and respectability politics in the United States. Per Pitchfork, the lyrics have "sensitive detail that give them the occasional rhythm of poetry." On the closing title track, several concepts are represented in only one verse, mainly with how the media and even people who are a part of gay communities negatively treat transgender people: "Remember those/Dead and gone/but don't let the media set us up for harm/HRC, selfish fucks/Yuppie gays threw us under the bus."

The first few lines of the opening track, "Give Violence A Chance", are "When peace is just another word for death, it's our turn to give violence a chance!" The song deals with how the amount of police brutality in society can lead to what Pitchfork described as "superstructures that determine who survives in America", lines including "Killer cops aren't crooked.../they do as they're told," and "Black lives don't matter in the eyes of the law."

The lyrics to "We Live" are about a person who shows the pride of being a transgender person and being able to successfully live in a society against transgender people. "We live with trauma locked inside / We fight against the urge to die."

On the lyrics for "Out From The Desk", the singer demands their listeners to attack: "Bent ears/Can't be enough/Out from the desk/Let's all crew up/Boot the fucker!” A Spin magazine critic wrote that the last line in the title song, "Not as weak as we seem", "show the folly in underestimating the resolve of people who fight every day just to stay alive."

Trans Day of Revenge is a d-beat and Boston hardcore album. Pitchfork analyzed that "G.L.O.S.S.'s songs tend to feel both old and new, the past and the present occurring simultaneously, layered on top of each other so they produce an interesting dissonance located somewhere between noise and precision." Another major contributor to the quality of the tracks, also according to Pitchfork, is the guitar lines that "resemble columns toppling," especially on "Fight" where the riffs cause the song to feel like it will "melt down into shapelessness."

== Production and release ==
The track "Give Violence a Chance" was first released as part of the compilation album NNT∞ Not Normal Presents... Hardcore by the label Not Normal Tapes; the compilation was issued on December 22, 2015. When reviewing "Give Violence a Chance" for Pitchfork, Nina Mashurova awarded the track the label of "Best New Track". Trans Day of Revenge was released worldwide via the group's Bandcamp page on June 13, 2016, a day after the Orlando nightclub shooting. The release date for the EP was set and revealed on June 11, a day before the shooting.

Physical copies of the album were distributed in Boston, Massachusetts by Nervous Nelly Records, Olympia, Washington by Total Negativity Records, Canada by PANSY TWIST distro, and other territories by Sabtoge Records. The album was dedicated in memory of Adan Parker (July 11, 1990 – November 10, 2015), a punk musician who, according to his obituary in Alaska Dispatch News, "believed deeply in social justice, was extremely principled and lived true to his strong personal values."

== Critical reception ==
Professional ratings
Review scores
Source	Rating
Pitchfork	8.5/10
Punknews.org	5/5 stars
Spin	8/10

Trans Day of Revenge garnered acclaim from both music journalists and listeners upon its release; many critics found it "essential" and "necessary" due to its message of taking violent measures instead of praying for peace.

Ivy Nelson, writing a review for Pitchfork, wrote that the album could significantly impact the culture of hardcore music and society in the future. She praised how the lyrics presented the record's message, writing that the group was "embedding politically complex ideas in emotionally unambiguous music without it flattening into a wave of rhetoric." Seattle Weekly critic Kelton Sears wrote the album's message of fighting to save lives was unique, given that "Much of today's punk, especially on a local level, has devolved into apathetic three-chord songs about pizza, beer, and the glories of being a screw-up."

Jessica Hopper of MTV News wrote, "For all the (old) folks forever lamenting that contemporary punk doesn’t have any meaning, or doesn’t have anything to be angry about, “Trans Day of Revenge” is a dialogue-squashing rebuttal — though not sure G.L.O.S.S. has dialogue on the agenda".

In a 2021 retrospective for KEXP, critic Martin Douglas called Trans Day of Revenge "as culturally significant a punk album as there has been in the past decade".

== Year-end list rankings ==
Publication	Rank
Bandcamp Daily	29
Crack (EPs)	6
Exclaim! (EPs)	1
Pretty Much Amazing	57
Noisey	87
Pitchfork (Rock Albums)	—N/a
Stereogum (EPs)	—N/a

== Track listing ==
TRANS DAY OF REVENGE – Standard version
No.	Title	Length
1.	"Give Violence A Chance"	1:54
2.	"Out From The Desk"	1:00
3.	"Fight"	1:04
4.	"We Live"	1:15
5.	"Trans Day Of Revenge"	1:45
Total length:		6:58

== Credits and personnel ==
Credits from the official Bandcamp page for G.L.O.S.S.

Location

- Recorded, engineered and produced at Punkall in Olympia, Washington, August 2015

Credits

- Corey^{[A]} – Drums
- Julaya^{[A]} – Bass guitar, cover art
- Sadie – Vocals
- Tannrr, Jake^{[A]} – Electric guitars
- Joey Seward – Producer, engineer
- Bex^{[A]} – Cover art "insert"

== Notes ==
- A The last names of the band members or other people credited on the album have not been revealed, apart from Sadie Switchblade.
