= 2016 in Australian music =

The following is a list of notable events and releases that happened in 2016 in music in Australia.

== Events ==
=== March ===
- 14 May – Australia's representative in the Eurovision Song Contest 2016, Dami Im, finishes in second place with 511 points for her song "Sound of Silence". She was beaten only by contest winner, Ukrainian representative Jamala.

=== July ===
- 22–24 July – Splendour in the Grass 2016 is held at North Byron Parklands in Yelgun, New South Wales, headlined by The Strokes, The Cure and Flume.

== Releases ==
=== Albums ===
- 27 May – Skin by Flume
- 19 August – Seven Mirrors by Drapht
- 10 December – The End of the Beginning by B-Nasty

=== Singles ===
- 16 January – Never Be like You by Flume
- 29 January – Smoke & Retribution by Flume
- 30 March – All Love by Drapht
- 22 April – Say It by Flume
- 10 June – In My Blood by The Veronicas
- 24 June – Monster Truck - by Allday
- 8 July – Mexico by Drapht
- 15 July – Sides by Allday
- 11 August – Send Nudes by Allday
- 14 October – On Your Side by The Veronicas
- 15 December – Raceway by Allday

== Deaths ==
- 8 March – Ross Hannaford, 65, guitarist, songwriter
- 9 March – Jon English, 66, singer, musician, songwriter
- 28 April – David Page, 55, musician
- 18 November – Hugh McDonald, 62, musician, singer, songwriter, guitarist
- 29 November – Allan Zavod, 71, musician
- 4 December – Wayne Duncan, 72, musician

== See also ==
- Australia in the Eurovision Song Contest 2016
- List of number-one singles of 2016 (Australia)
- List of number-one albums of 2016 (Australia)
