= 2016 in Indian music =

== Deaths ==
- February 18 - Abdul Rashid Khan, 107, Hindustani musician
- March 6 - Kalabhavan Mani, 45, actor and singer (liver cirrhosis and methyl alcohol poisoning)
- November 22 - M. Balamuralikrishna, 86, Carnatic musician and composer
- December 15 - Ajit Varman, 69, composer
