= Jimmy Levine =

American R&B songwriter

James Levine (1954 – August 9, 2016) was an American R&B songwriter, multi-instrumentalist and record producer.

He was born in San Francisco, and learned to play saxophone before the age of ten. He studied at Richmond High School, and joined a local band, Black Pain & Co. After moving to Los Angeles to study at UCLA, he met Gene Page, who invited him to play with Marvin Gaye's touring band. He also worked as a staff songwriter for Jobete at Motown, writing songs for The Jacksons, Rick James, and Teena Marie, among others, and developed a friendship with Marvin's wife Anna Gordy Gaye, who employed him as president of her Out Post production company.

After leaving Motown and relocating to Chicago, he worked with producer Carl Davis and formed a band, BLT, with Richard Tufo and Jesse Boyce. He also worked with singer Lowrell Simon, and co-wrote songs with Simon for artists including The Dells, Barry White, and Gene Chandler. He contributed to material for Sly and the Family Stone, Al Green, and Herbie Hancock. In 2006, he released his own album, Share My Love, which included collaborations with Ray Parker Jr. among others. He founded the Mo-Philly production company in 2008.

He died from cancer in 2016.
