= Little Royal and The Swingmasters =

Little Royal
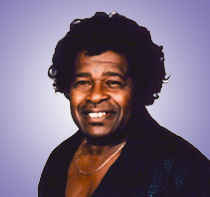

Background information
- Born: Royal Torrence; November 20, 1933; Washington, D.C., U.S.
- Died: September 29, 2016 (aged 82) Washington, D.C.
- Genres: Northern soul, soul, funk
- Instrument: Vocals
- Labels: King; Tri-us; Carnival Records

Little Royal and The Swingmasters was an American soul and R&B group active in the 1960s and 1970s. Due to the resemblance, both physically and stylistically, Little Royal was often called "James Brown's little brother".

Notable people who have performed with Little Royal include Teddy Pendergrass and Bobby Parker.

The title track of his album Jealous, reached No. 15 on Billboard's Best-Selling Soul Singles chart on August 5, 1972.

Little Royal died at the age of 82 on September 29, 2016.

== Discography ==
=== Albums ===
- Title: Jealous
- Label: King 1145-498
- Release date and origin: 1972/ USA

Songs:

1. "Jealous"
2. "I'll Come Crawling"
3. "Razor Blade"
4. "Keep on Pushing Your Luck"
5. "Losing Battle"
6. "Panama Red"
7. "You'll Lose a Good Thing"
8. "That's My Desire"
9. "Soul Train"
10. "Rainbow"
11. "My Love Needs Company"

=== Singles ===
- "I Can Tell" / "You Know (You Made Me Love You)" (Carnival, 1967)
- "Jealous" / "Razor Blade" (Tri-us, 1972)
- "I'll Come Crawling" / "Panama Red" (Tri-us, 1972)
- "I Surrender" / "Soul Train" (Tri-us, 1972)
- "Keep On Pushing Your Luck" / "(I Want To Be Free) Don't Want Nobody Standing Over Me" (Tri-us, 1973)
- "My Love Needs Company" / "I'm Glad To Do It" (Tri-us, 1973)
- "Miss Lady" / "Rainbow" (Tri-us, 1975)
- "Groovin-Ain't No Love-Just My Imagination" / "Bring it on Home-Higher and Higher" (Flame, 1985)
- "Down on the Sand" / "Down on the Sand Part II" (Flame, 1986)
