= Fake Fruit (band) =

Post-punk band based in Oakland, California

- Origin: New York City, New York
- Genres: Post-punk
- Years active: 2016–present
- Labels: Rocks In Your Head Records, Carpark Records
- Members: Hannah D'Amato, Miles MacDiarmid, Alex Post
- Website: www.fakefruit.biz

Fake Fruit is a post-punk band based in Oakland, California, led by Hannah "Ham" D'Amato. Originally founded in 2016, the group has released two studio albums: Fake Fruit (2021) and Mucho Mistrust (2024).

== History ==
D'Amato founded Fake Fruit in New York City in 2016, originally as a duo. At the time, she had applied to the Berklee College of Music, but opted not to attend after an unpleasant experience with her audition, in which one of the panelists turned down the volume on her guitar amp while she was performing. By 2017, D'Amato had moved to Vancouver, British Columbia, and Fake Fruit had become a trio. She moved to the Bay Area of California in 2018, where she met Alex Post and Miles MacDiarmid, who soon became the band's guitarist and drummer, respectively. The band cycled through what Pitchfork later called a "rotating cast of bassists" over the next several years.

Fake Fruit released their self-titled debut album in 2021 on Sonny Smith's record label Rocks In Your Head Records. It was initially released on a limited vinyl pressing of only 250 copies, but this sold out quickly, as did subsequent pressings of 500 and 1,000 copies each. The band went on to tour with Grammy-winning band Wet Leg and opened for such artists as Alvvays and Dry Cleaning. For their follow-up album, they worked with producer Jack Shirley at his Atomic Garden Studio in Oakland. The resulting album, Mucho Mistrust, was released on Carpark Records in August 2024.

== Critical reception ==
Writing in Pitchfork, Maria Sherman gave Fake Fruit's self-titled 2021 album a 7.5 out of 10, describing it as "an occasionally dissonant, frequently delightful album where fun and fury overlap" and concluding, "Rarely does a band’s first record speak with such a trenchant voice." She also compared D'Amato's vocals to those of Courtney Barnett, a comparison that was also made in favorable reviews of this album by Willis Schenk in Maximum Rocknroll and Bill Pearls in BrooklynVegan.

Mucho Mistrust also received a favorable review in Pitchfork, which gave it a 7.6 out of 10. Pitchfork critic Zach Schonfeld summarized the album as follows: "In 12 tightly wound tracks, D’Amato and her bandmates, drummer Miles MacDiarmid and guitarist Alex Post, forge a rickety bridge between the righteous indignation of riot grrrl and the staccato unease of the UK’s post-punk revivalists." Writing for PopMatters, Chris Conaton was somewhat less favorable in his assessment of the album, which he gave a 6 out of 10. Conaton concluded that "Mucho Mistrust is, at times, a lot of fun. At other points, Fake Fruit’s general sloppiness gets a little exhausting."

== Discography ==
- Fake Fruit (Rocks In Your Head, 2021)
- Mucho Mistrust (Carpark, 2024)
