= 2016 in Swedish music =

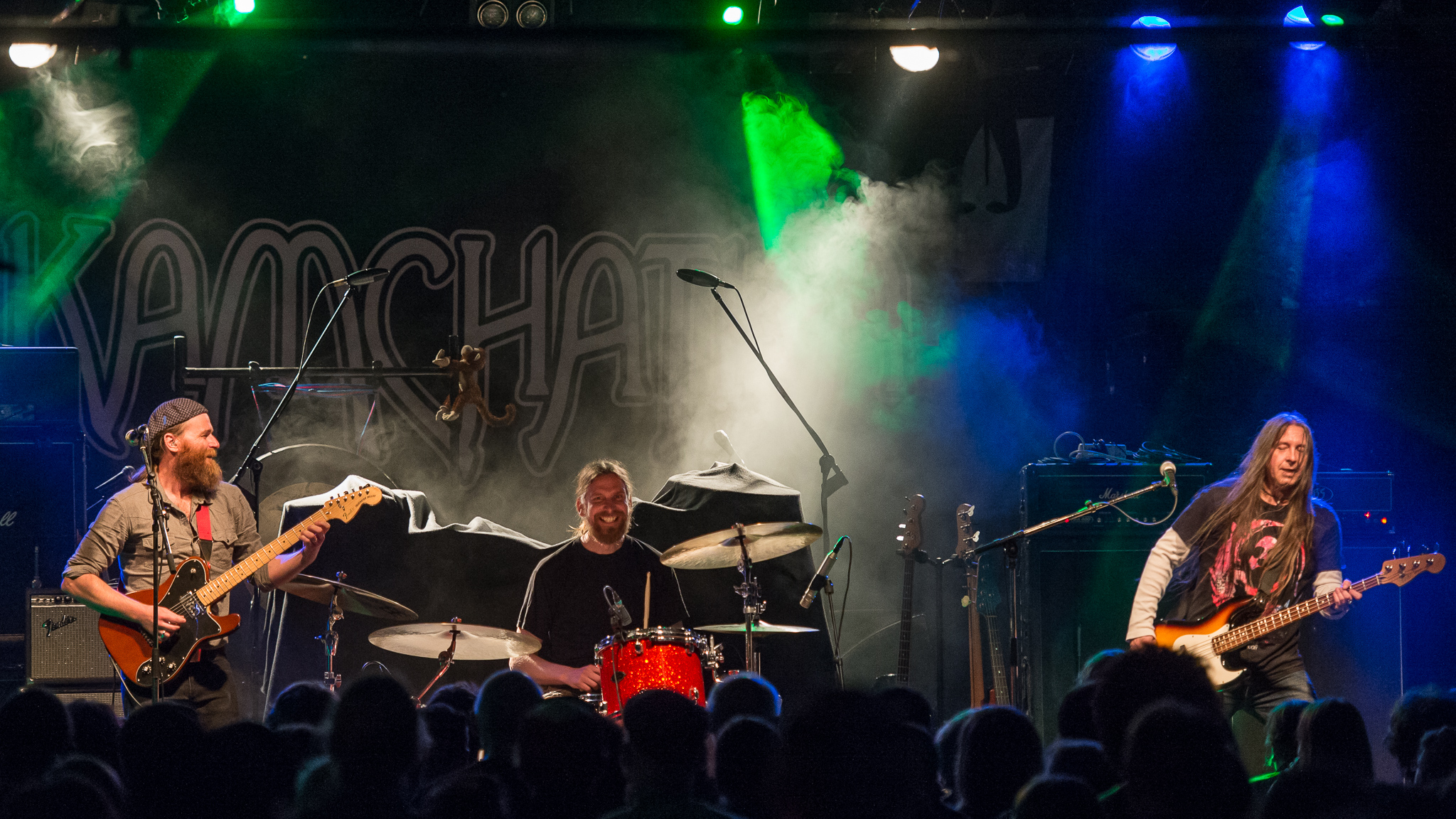
Kamchatka in 2016.

The following is a list of notable events and releases of the year 2016 in Swedish music.

== Events ==
=== January ===
- 25
  - The draw to determine which country will participate in which semi-final of the Eurovision Song Contest 2016 took place in Stockholm City Hall. Sweden is pre-allocated to vote and perform in the first semi-final for scheduling reasons.

=== February ===
- 6 – Start of the 56th edition of the Melodifestivalen. The next three semi-finals will take place on February 13, 20, and 27.
- 15
  - The announcement of jazz saxophonist and composer Jonas Kullhammar as the recipient of the 2016 Gullinpriset (awarded in memory of the saxophonist Lars Gullin (1928–1976)).
- 26 – A remix of Zara Larsson's hit single "Lush Life", featuring Tinie Tempah, is released, and soon becomes a top 10 hit internationally.

=== March ===
- 5 – The Melodifestivalen second chance took place on March 5.
- 12 – The final of the Melodifestivalen was executed on March 12, 2016.

=== April ===
- 23 – The Gamlestaden Jazzfestival opened in Gothenburg, Sweden (April 23 – 30).

=== May ===
- 14
  - The final of the Eurovision Song Contest 2016 took place at the Ericsson Globe in Stockholm.
  - Sweden finishes as no 9 as the only Scandinavian country to reach the final.

=== June ===
- 8 – The 24th Sweden Rock Festival started in Norje (June 8 – 11).
- 15 – Max Martin was awarded the Polar Music Prize.
- 30 – The 4th Bråvalla Festival opened near Norrköping (June 30 - July 2).

=== July ===
- 10 – Jonas Kullhammar was awarded Gullinpriset at a concert at Sanda Church in memory of late saxophonist Lars Gullin (1928–1976).

=== August ===
- 12 – Malmöfestivalen opened (August 12 – 19).

=== October ===
- 7 – The 33rd Stockholm Jazz Festival started in Stockholm, Sweden ( October 7–16).

== Album and singles releases ==
=== January ===
Day	Album	Artist	Label	Notes	Ref.
8	Anders Hillborg: Sirens; Cold Heat; Beast Sampler	Esa-Pekka Salonen and The Royal Stockholm Philharmonic Orchestra	BIS Records		
29	Some Other Time – A Tribute To Leonard Bernstein	Nils Landgren	ACT Music		

=== February ===
Day	Album	Artist	Label	Notes	Ref.
1	Songbook	Lars Danielsson	ACT		
12	Piano Mating	Mats Gustafsson	Blue Tapes and X-Ray Records		
17	Picture You	The Amazing, including with guitarist Reine Fiske	Partisan Records		
26	Mare Nostrum II	Jan Lundgren	ACT		

=== March ===
Day	Album	Artist	Label	Notes	Ref.
6	Trees Of Light	Anders Jormin / Lena Willemark / Karin Nakagawa	ECM		
18	Forevergreens	Dan Berglund's Tonbruket	ACT		

=== May ===
Day	Album	Artist	Label	Notes	Ref.
20	Då Som Nu För Alltid	Kent	RCA, Sony Music		

=== June ===
Day	Album	Artist	Label	Notes	Ref.
1	World On Fire	Yngwie Malmsteen	RCA, Sony Music		
3	Good Karma	Roxette	Parlophone/Roxette	Produced by Christoffer Lundquist, Clarence Öfwerman, Per Gessle	

=== August ===
Day	Album	Artist	Label	Notes	Ref.
26	Du Gamla Du Fria	Håkan Hellström	Warner		

=== September ===
Day	Album	Artist	Label	Notes	Ref.
16	Dödliga Klassiker	Bob Hund	Woah Dad!		
16	Orphée	Jóhann Jóhannsson	Deutsche Grammophon		

=== October ===
Day	Album	Artist	Label	Notes	Ref.
28	Homeward Bound	Sabina Ddumba	Warner Music Sweden		
28	Lady Wood by Tove Lo (Island Records	Sabina Ddumba	Island Records		

=== November ===
Day	Album	Artist	Label	Notes	Ref.
4	Christmas Card from a Painted Lady	Kikki Danielsson	Lionheart/Universal	Produced by Sören Karlsson	
25	Häxan	Dungen	Mexican Summer		

=== Unknown date ===
- Efter Regnet by Freddie Wadling
- Mitt hjärta klappar för dig by Benny Anderssons orkester

== Deaths ==
January

- 17 – Carina Jaarnek, singer and Dansband artist (cerebral haemorrhage) (born 1962).

February

- 29 – Josefin Nilsson, singer and actress (born 1969).

May

- 1 – Sydney Onayemi, disc jockey (born 1937).
- 4 – Olle Ljungström, singer and guitarist (born 1961).
- 16 – Fredrik Norén, jazz drummer and band leader (born 1941).

June

- 2 – Freddie Wadling, singer and songwriter (born 1951).

September

- 27 - Märta Schéle, singer (born 1936).

November

- 12 – Jacques Werup, musician, author, poet, stage artist, and screenwriter (born 1945).

== See also ==
- Music of Sweden
- Sweden in the Eurovision Song Contest 2016
- List of number-one singles and albums in Sweden (see 2016 section on page)
