= Quan Minyu =

Chinese singer and dancer

Quan Minyu (or Jun Min-woo, Chinese: 全敏宇; pinyin: Quán Mǐnyǔ; Korean: 전민우; 2004 – February 9, 2016), known as Little Psy, was a Chinese child singer and dancer of Korean descent. He became well known in China and South Korea after he impersonated Psy in the fourth season of Chinese Dream Show. Quan was diagnosed with DIPG in 2014 and died at the age of 12 on February 9, 2016.
