= 2016 in Irish music =

The following is a list of notable events and releases happened in: 2016, music, Ireland.

== Events ==
Allie Sherlock starts performing.

== Albums ==
- Little Green Cars – Ephemera
