= Lecresia Campbell =

American singer (1962–2016)

- Born: October 30, 1962; Chicago, Illinois, United States
- Died: September 29, 2016 (aged 53) Atlanta, Georgia, United States
- Genres: Gospel
- Occupation: Soprano singer
- Years active: 1984–2016

Lecresia M. Campbell (October 30, 1962 – September 29, 2016) was an American soprano gospel singer noted for her incredibly high and wide vocal range.

== Career ==
Campbell began singing from a young age, and by 1984 was performing with the Children of Israel choir of Cade Chapel from Chicago. She released her debut album Draw Me Near, which debuted at number 31 on the Billboard charts spiritual albums. It reached number 30 and stayed on the charts for 13 weeks. She performed in the 1980s with other famous gospel singers such as Bobby Jones.

She made her singing breakthrough in 1990 with the acclaimed Perfect Praise. She provided the lead vocals on the song, accompanied by Walt Whitman & the Soul Children of Chicago. She received a degree in applied voice from Tougaloo College, and taught in elementary school for eight years. She also worked with Milton Brunson's Thompson Community Singers and the Mississippi Mass Choir.

She worked as a backup vocalist for Vanessa Bell Armstrong while concurerntly paving her own solo career. She stayed in the South in her adulthood, including in Montgomery, Alabama, and sang with countless choirs across churches and other gospel events. In 1999, she starred in David E. Talbert's Mr. Right Now. In 2000, she starred in His Woman, His Wife, along with lead actor Malik Yoba. In 2003, she starred in Laterras Whitfield's Tell it to the Judge, along with Greg Mathis.

=== Discography ===
- Draw Me Near (1986)
- Even Me (1998)

== Reputation ==
Campbell was famed in gospel circles and in Black church communities. Chris Fenner, editor for the Hymnology Archive at the Southern Baptist Theological Seminary stated "She had one of those coloratura soprano voices. She had an amazing range..." On her starring in a 1991 production of Tintypes; Sid Smith of the Chicago Tribune said that "Campbell's silvery gospel vocals are the best thing about the show..."

== Personal life and death ==
Campbell was born in Chicago in 1962. She died on September 29, 2016 of a pulmonary embolism after a short time in physical rehabilitation following a stroke. She is buried at Westview Cemetery in Atlanta.

Her sister, Felicia, is the founder and pastor at Love, Faith & Hope Lutheran Church in Chicago.
