= Abdul Rashid Khan =

Indian singer

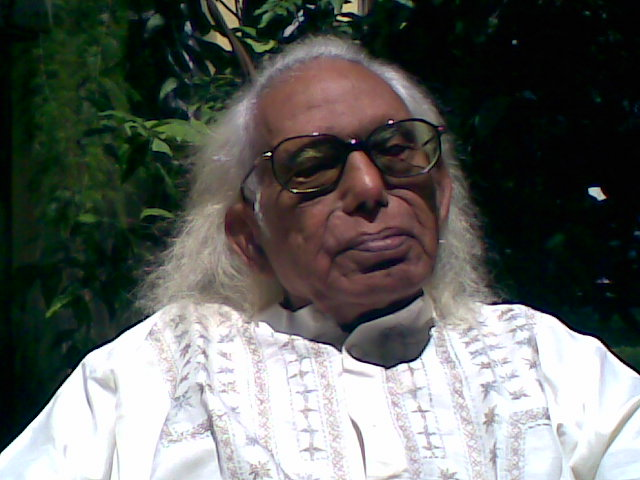
- Abdul Rashid Khan

Background information
- Also known as: Rasan Piya
- Born: 19 August 1908
- Origin: Uttar Pradesh, India
- Died: 18 February 2016 (aged 107) Kolkata, West Bengal, India
- Genre: Hindustani classical music
- Occupations: Singer, resident guru at itc sangeet research academy, kolkata
- Years active: 1973–2016

Ustad Abdul Rashid Khan (19 August 1908 – 18 February 2016) was an Indian vocalist of Hindustani music. Apart from khayal, he performed dhrupad, dhamar and thumri. As of 2020, he is the oldest person to have been conferred a Padma award.

== Early life ==
Abdul Rashid Khan was born in a family of musicians tracing back to Behram Khan, who was a singer of traditional Gwalior gharana gayaki. He received his initial training from his father's elder brother Bade Yusuf Khan and from his father Chhote Yusuf Khan.

This was followed by extensive musical training from his family elders like Chand Khan, Barkhudar Khan and Mahtab Khan who taught him the Gwalior Gayaki. He further developed this style suiting his own artistic sensitivity. He was a descendant of Tansen, a renowned singer who was one of the nine gems in the court of Akbar the Great during the sixteenth century.

== Career ==
Abdul Rashid Khan's traditional compositions have been recorded by the BBC and Iraq Radio. Organizations like Uttar Pradesh Sangeet Natak Akademi, Lucknow and ITC Sangeet Research Academy, Kolkata have recorded and preserved many of his compositions. For several decades, he was a regular performer on Akashvani and Doordarshan Lucknow. Khan participated in many national and regional conferences like Sadarang Conference, Godrej Conference, Lucknow Mahotsav, Dover Lance Conference, ITC Sangeet Sammelan, Prayag Sangeet Samiti Sangeet Sammelan all over India. He has been felicitated by critics, fellow artists and many reputed recognized institutions like Uttar Pradesh Sangeet Natak Academy (1981), Banaras Hindu University (1993), Eastern Zone cultural center and Press Club Kolkata.

Abdul Rashid Khan composed over 2000 compositions over his lifetime and was also a prolific writer and poet under the pseudonym "Rasan Piya". Many compositions (bandish) that he sang were his own creations. He trained numerous students in his lifetime and became regarded as a "guru" at the ITC Sangeet Research Academy, Kolkata.

== Death ==
Abdul Rashid Khan died on 18 February 2016 at the age of 107.

== Awards and recognition ==
- ITC Sangeet Research Academy Award (1994)
- Sangeet Natak Akademi Award (2009)
- Kashi Swar Ganga Award (2003)
- Ras Sagar (title) Award (2004)
- Bhuwalka Award (2010)
- Padma Bhushan (2012) – the oldest person ever to be conferred a Padma award.
- Lifetime achievement award (2013) by Government of NCT of Delhi.

He was a member of the All India Radio Audition Committee, New Delhi and was awarded many titles by reputed organizations including the prestigious title of "Banga Bibhushan" in 2015 by the government of West Bengal.
