= Novosibirsk Specialized Music School =

- Novosibirsk, Russia

Information
- Type: Music school
- Opened: 1970
- Website: nsmsh.ru/en

Novosibirsk Specialized Music School was founded in 1970, and in 2003 was officially designated by the State Duma a school for children with exceptional ability in the arts. It is one of only two music schools in Russia directly subordinate to the Ministry of Culture.

Nearly 180 young musicians from Novosibirsk, different cities of Russia and other countries study at 5 departments. Also, college students often play in most famous concert halls in Russia, United States, Italy, Germany, Japan, Great Britain, France, Switzerland, Brazil, Korea. The names of graduates are Vadim Repin, Maxim Vengerov, and others.
