= Sydney Onayemi =

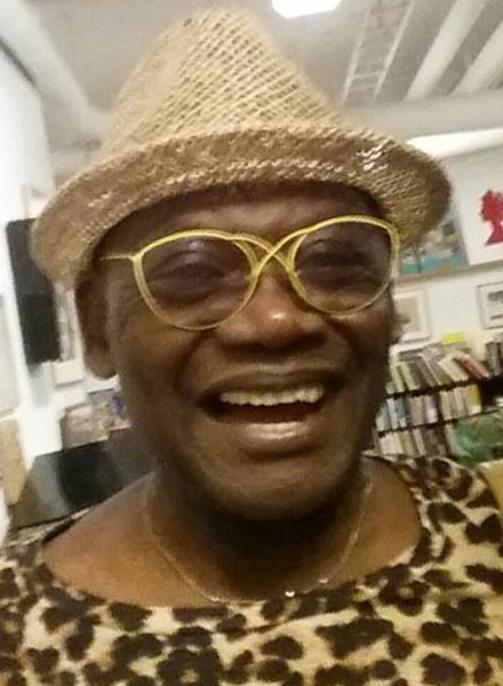
- Mid-1990s snapshot of Onayemi
- Born: Abayomi Sydney Onayemi; 1937 (age 88–89); Lagos, Nigeria

Abayomi Sydney Onayemi (3 November 1937 – 1 May 2016), also known as Big Brother Sydney, was a Nigerian-born Swedish disc jockey.

His other name "Abayomi" means "he brings me joy and happiness" in the Yoruba language. Onayemi came to Sweden in 1962 to study finance at the prestigious Stockholm School of Economics. After two years he had to drop out of school due to lack of money. In order to pay his bills he started working at restaurants, mainly cleaning bathrooms at the Strands Maritime. Eventually he started deejaying soul, and later funk and disco, music that was fairly new to Sweden. He also sang along to the tracks, added maracas and other live percussions. In 1972 he opened his own discothèque Big Brother.

He opened his fourth discothèque Confetti in 1984, a gay discothèque, and also worked as resident DJ at various other discothèques throughout the years. In between he also opened the discothèques "Knattedisco" and "1984".

In 2010 he came out of retirement for a onetime event at the Loveboat 12 club, celebrating the Disco era.

== Influence ==
He has been credited in one publication for introducing the two turntable style of deejaying from the United States and Jamaica to Scandinavia. He has also been credited for introducing Swedish 1980s new wave and synthpop acts like Ratata, Mauro Scocco and Lustans Lakejer to funk music according to Lustans Lakejer vocalist Johan Kinde and nightclub entrepreneur Joakim Langer.

In a 2012 radio documentary, Swedish National Radio named him the nation's first superstar Disc Jockey.

== Personal life ==
He retired and lived in the Östermalm neighbourhood of Stockholm.
