= Dolores Vargas =

- Born: María Dolores Castellón Vargas; 16 May 1936; Barcelona, Spain
- Died: 7 August 2016 (aged 80) Valencia, Spain
- Genres: Andalusian folklore
- Occupation: Singer
- Instrument: Vocals
- Years active: 1951–1987

María Dolores Castellón Vargas (16 May 1936 – 7 August 2016) was a Spanish singer. When she was young she went to sing at the theatre Teatro Calderón of Madrid. She sang alongside her brother, Enrique. Later she appeared on television, notably A la española, directed by Valerio Lazarov (1971).

Her real popularity came with the song Achilipú (The song below).

== Personal life ==
When her husband died in 1987 she retired. She died in Valencia on 7 August 2016 from complications of leukemia at age 80.
