= List of number-one hits of 2019 (Austria) =

This is a list of the Austrian number-one singles and albums of 2019 as compiled by Ö3 Austria Top 40, the official chart provider of Austria.

| Issue date | Song | Artist | Album | Artist |
|---|---|---|---|---|
| 4 January | "All I Want for Christmas Is You" | Mariah Carey | Springsteen on Broadway | Bruce Springsteen |
| 11 January | "Sweet but Psycho" | Ava Max | Die grössten Partyhits – Volume X | Die Grubertaler |
| 18 January | "Sweet but Psycho" | Ava Max | Neujahrskonzert 2019 | Wiener Philharmoniker and Christian Thielemann |
| 25 January | "Dodi" | Shindy | Wirbelwind | Melissa Naschenweng |
| 1 February | "Hobby Hobby" | Mero | Wirbelwind | Melissa Naschenweng |
| 8 February | "Prinzessa" | Capital Bra | DNA | Backstreet Boys |
| 15 February | "Prinzessa" | Capital Bra | Kinder vom Land | Hannah |
| 22 February | "Ferrari" | Eno featuring Mero | Thank U, Next | Ariana Grande |
| 1 March | "DNA" | KC Rebell featuring Summer Cem and Capital Bra | Thank U, Next | Ariana Grande |
| 8 March | "Capital Bra je m'appelle" | Capital Bra | Vernissage My Heart | Bilderbuch |
| 15 March | "2x" | Mathea | I, the Mask | In Flames |
| 22 March | "Wolke 10" | Mero | Super Plus | Azet and Zuna |
| 29 March | "Wir ticken" | Capital Bra and Samra | Ya Hero Ya Mero | Mero |
| 5 April | "Cherry Lady" | Capital Bra | Ya Hero Ya Mero | Mero |
| 12 April | "Cherry Lady" | Capital Bra | When We All Fall Asleep, Where Do We Go? | Billie Eilish |
| 19 April | "Harami" | Samra | Mosaik | Andrea Berg |
| 26 April | "Rolex" | Capital Bra featuring Summer Cem and KC Rebell | CB6 | Capital Bra |
| 3 May | "Old Town Road" | Lil Nas X | Mosaik | Andrea Berg |
| 10 May | "Old Town Road" | Lil Nas X | CB6 | Capital Bra |
| 17 May | "Old Town Road" | Lil Nas X | Mosaik | Andrea Berg |
| 24 May | "I Don't Care" | Ed Sheeran and Justin Bieber | Mosaik | Andrea Berg |
| 31 May | "Wieder Lila" | Samra and Capital Bra | Rammstein | Rammstein |
| 7 June | "Wieder Lila" | Samra and Capital Bra | Rammstein | Rammstein |
| 14 June | "Old Town Road" | Lil Nas X | Herz Kraft Werke | Sarah Connor |
| 21 June | "Old Town Road" | Lil Nas X | Herz Kraft Werke | Sarah Connor |
| 28 June | "Old Town Road" | Lil Nas X | Western Stars | Bruce Springsteen |
| 5 July | "Tilidin" | Capital Bra and Samra | Western Stars | Bruce Springsteen |
| 12 July | "Señorita" | Shawn Mendes and Camila Cabello | Obststand 2 | LX and Maxwell |
| 19 July | "Señorita" | Shawn Mendes and Camila Cabello | So ist das Leben | Semino Rossi |
| 26 July | "Señorita" | Shawn Mendes and Camila Cabello | No.6 Collaborations Project | Ed Sheeran |
| 2 August | "Neptun" | KC Rebell and RAF Camora | Für Ewig | Nockis |
| 9 August | "Señorita" | Shawn Mendes and Camila Cabello | Für immer | Seiler und Speer |
| 16 August | "Señorita" | Shawn Mendes and Camila Cabello | Rewind, Replay, Rebound | Volbeat |
| 23 August | "Señorita" | Shawn Mendes and Camila Cabello | Megageil im Juzi-Style | Die Jungen Zillertaler |
| 30 August | "Señorita" | Shawn Mendes and Camila Cabello | Megageil im Juzi-Style | Die Jungen Zillertaler |
| 6 September | "Nummer 1" | Capital Bra and Samra | Megageil im Juzi-Style | Die Jungen Zillertaler |
| 13 September | "Vendetta" | RAF Camora | Wer nicht fühlen will, muss hören | Pizzera & Jaus |
| 20 September | "Dance Monkey" | Tones and I | Ciao! | Wanda |
| 27 September | "Dance Monkey" | Tones and I | Best of Volks-Rock'n'Roller | Andreas Gabalier |
| 4 October | "Dance Monkey" | Tones and I | Starkregen | Rainhard Fendrich |
| 11 October | "Dance Monkey" | Tones and I | Ich und keine Maske | Sido |
| 18 October | "Dance Monkey" | Tones and I | Berlin lebt 2 | Capital Bra and Samra |
| 25 October | "Dance Monkey" | Tones and I | Berlin lebt 2 | Capital Bra and Samra |
| 1 November | "Dance Monkey" | Tones and I | Kiddy Contest Vol. 25 | Kiddy Contest Kids |
| 8 November | "Dance Monkey" | Tones and I | Alles ohne Strom | Die Toten Hosen |
| 15 November | "Dance Monkey" | Tones and I | Zenit | RAF Camora |
| 22 November | "Dance Monkey" | Tones and I | Zenit | RAF Camora |
| 29 November | "Dance Monkey" | Tones and I | Analog | Seer |
| 6 December | "Dance Monkey" | Tones and I | The Christmas Present | Robbie Williams |
| 13 December | "Der Bratan bleibt der gleiche" | Capital Bra | The Christmas Present | Robbie Williams |
| 20 December | "Dance Monkey" | Tones and I | The Christmas Present | Robbie Williams |
| 27 December | No Top 40 released | | | |
