= List of number-one hits of 2019 (Switzerland) =

This is a list of the Swiss Hitparade number ones of 2019.

== Swiss charts ==
Issue date	Song	Artist	Album	Artist
6 January	"Sweet but Psycho"	Ava Max	A Star Is Born	Lady Gaga and Bradley Cooper
13 January	"Sweet but Psycho"	Ava Max	A Star Is Born	Lady Gaga and Bradley Cooper
20 January	"Dodi"	Shindy	A Star Is Born	Lady Gaga and Bradley Cooper
27 January	"7 Rings"	Ariana Grande	White Garden	Anna Rossinelli
3 February	"Prinzessa"	Capital Bra	DNA	Backstreet Boys
10 February	"Sweet but Psycho"	Ava Max	Emma	Sina
17 February	"Ferrari"	Eno featuring Mero	KKS	Kool Savas
24 February	"Sweet but Psycho"	Ava Max	Förschi	Kunz
3 March	"Shallow"	Lady Gaga and Bradley Cooper	Distance over Time	Dream Theater
10 March	"Shallow"	Lady Gaga and Bradley Cooper	A Star Is Born	Lady Gaga and Bradley Cooper
17 March	"Shallow"	Lady Gaga and Bradley Cooper	Le monde des Enfoirés	Les Enfoirés
24 March	"Wir ticken"	Capital Bra and Samra	Ya Hero Ya Mero	Mero
31 March	"Cherry Lady"	Capital Bra	All We Need Is Love	Stefanie Heinzmann
7 April	"Deutschland"	Rammstein	When We All Fall Asleep, Where Do We Go?	Billie Eilish
14 April	"Harami"	Samra	Mosaik	Andrea Berg
21 April	"Rolex"	Capital Bra featuring Summer Cem and KC Rebell	Deux frères	PNL
28 April	"Old Town Road"	Lil Nas X	Hasso	KC Rebell
5 May	"Old Town Road"	Lil Nas X	Hurts 2B Human	Pink
12 May	"Old Town Road"	Lil Nas X	Berserker	Amon Amarth
19 May	"I Don't Care"	Ed Sheeran and Justin Bieber	Endlos Liebe	Calimeros
26 May	"She Got Me"	Luca Hänni	Rammstein	Rammstein
2 June	"She Got Me"	Luca Hänni	Cut Up	Patent Ochsner
9 June	"She Got Me"	Luca Hänni	Cut Up	Patent Ochsner
16 June	"Old Town Road"	Lil Nas X	Rammstein	Rammstein
23 June	"Old Town Road"	Lil Nas X	Western Stars	Bruce Springsteen
30 June	"Tilidin"	Capital Bra and Samra	Natürlich!	Beatrice Egli
7 July	"Señorita"	Shawn Mendes and Camila Cabello	Les étoiles vagabondes	Nekfeu
14 July	"Señorita"	Shawn Mendes and Camila Cabello	So ist das Leben	Semino Rossi
21 July	"Señorita"	Shawn Mendes and Camila Cabello	No.6 Collaborations Project	Ed Sheeran
28 July	"Señorita"	Shawn Mendes and Camila Cabello	The Great War	Sabaton
4 August	"Señorita"	Shawn Mendes and Camila Cabello	Babylon	Die Amigos
11 August	"Señorita"	Shawn Mendes and Camila Cabello	Rewind, Replay, Rebound	Volbeat
18 August	"Señorita"	Shawn Mendes and Camila Cabello	Büetzer Buebe	Gölä and Trauffer
25 August	"Señorita"	Shawn Mendes and Camila Cabello	Büetzer Buebe	Gölä and Trauffer
1 September	"Señorita"	Shawn Mendes and Camila Cabello	Büetzer Buebe	Gölä and Trauffer
8 September	"Señorita"	Shawn Mendes and Camila Cabello	Norman Fucking Rockwell	Lana Del Rey
15 September	"Dance Monkey"	Tones and I	Casanova	Fantasy
22 September	"Dance Monkey"	Tones and I	Ärdeschön	Heimweh
29 September	"Dance Monkey"	Tones and I	Homeless Songs	Stephan Eicher
6 October	"Dance Monkey"	Tones and I	No 3 Nächt bis morn	Tommy Vercetti
13 October	"Dance Monkey"	Tones and I	Berlin lebt 2	Capital Bra and Samra
20 October	"Dance Monkey"	Tones and I	Hush!	Dada Ante Portas
27 October	"Dance Monkey"	Tones and I	Walk the Sky	Alter Bridge
3 November	"Dance Monkey"	Tones and I	Alles ohne Strom	Die Toten Hosen
10 November	"Dance Monkey"	Tones and I	Zenit	RAF Camora
17 November	"Dance Monkey"	Tones and I	D.O.C.	Zucchero Fornaciari
24 November	"Dance Monkey"	Tones and I	Courage	Celine Dion
1 December	"Dance Monkey"	Tones and I	Everyday Life	Coldplay
8 December	"Dance Monkey"	Tones and I	The Christmas Present	Robbie Williams
15 December	"Dance Monkey"	Tones and I	The Christmas Present	Robbie Williams
22 December	"Dance Monkey"	Tones and I	Let Life Flow	Philipp Fankhauser
29 December	"All I Want for Christmas Is You"	Mariah Carey	Carlo Cokxxx Nutten 4	Bushido and Animus

== Romandie charts ==
Issue date	Song	Artist	Album	Artist
6 January	"Shallow"	Lady Gaga and Bradley Cooper	Mon pays c'est l'amour	Johnny Hallyday
13 January	"Shallow"	Lady Gaga and Bradley Cooper	Mon pays c'est l'amour	Johnny Hallyday
20 January	"Shallow"	Lady Gaga and Bradley Cooper	A Star Is Born	Lady Gaga and Bradley Cooper
27 January	"Shallow"	Lady Gaga and Bradley Cooper	A Star Is Born	Lady Gaga and Bradley Cooper
3 February	"Shallow"	Lady Gaga and Bradley Cooper	Lettre infinie	M
10 February	"Shallow"	Lady Gaga and Bradley Cooper	Resist	Within Temptation
17 February	"Shallow"	Lady Gaga and Bradley Cooper	A Star Is Born	Lady Gaga and Bradley Cooper
24 February	"Shallow"	Lady Gaga and Bradley Cooper	Hüh!	Stephan Eicher and Traktorkestar
3 March	"Shallow"	Lady Gaga and Bradley Cooper	A Star Is Born	Lady Gaga and Bradley Cooper
10 March	"Shallow"	Lady Gaga and Bradley Cooper	A Star Is Born	Lady Gaga and Bradley Cooper
17 March	"Shallow"	Lady Gaga and Bradley Cooper	Le monde des Enfoirés	Les Enfoirés
24 March	"Shallow"	Lady Gaga and Bradley Cooper	Le monde des Enfoirés	Les Enfoirés
31 March	"Shallow"	Lady Gaga and Bradley Cooper	Le monde des Enfoirés	Les Enfoirés
7 April	"Shallow"	Lady Gaga and Bradley Cooper	Le monde des Enfoirés	Les Enfoirés
14 April	"Shallow"	Lady Gaga and Bradley Cooper	Deux frères	PNL
21 April	"Always Remember Us This Way"	Lady Gaga	Deux frères	PNL
28 April	"Always Remember Us This Way"	Lady Gaga	Deux frères	PNL
5 May	"Always Remember Us This Way"	Lady Gaga	Hurts 2B Human	Pink
12 May	"Always Remember Us This Way"	Lady Gaga	Berserker	Amon Amarth
19 May	"I Don't Care"	Ed Sheeran and Justin Bieber	A Star Is Born	Lady Gaga and Bradley Cooper
26 May	"She Got Me"	Luca Hänni	Rammstein	Rammstein
2 June	"Always Remember Us This Way"	Lady Gaga	Rammstein	Rammstein
9 June	"I Don't Care"	Ed Sheeran and Justin Bieber	Rammstein	Rammstein
16 June	"Always Remember Us This Way"	Lady Gaga	Aime la vie	Florent Pagny
23 June	"Balance ton quoi"	Angèle	Les étoiles vagabondes	Nekfeu
30 June	"Señorita"	Shawn Mendes and Camila Cabello	Les étoiles vagabondes	Nekfeu
7 July	"Old Town Road"	Lil Nas X	Les étoiles vagabondes	Nekfeu
14 July	"Señorita"	Shawn Mendes and Camila Cabello	Les étoiles vagabondes	Nekfeu
21 July	"Señorita"	Shawn Mendes and Camila Cabello	No.6 Collaborations Project	Ed Sheeran
28 July	"Señorita"	Shawn Mendes and Camila Cabello	The Great War	Sabaton
4 August	"Señorita"	Shawn Mendes and Camila Cabello	Babylon	Die Amigos
11 August	"Señorita"	Shawn Mendes and Camila Cabello	Rewind, Replay, Rebound	Volbeat
18 August	"Señorita"	Shawn Mendes and Camila Cabello	We Are Not Your Kind	Slipknot
25 August	"Señorita"	Shawn Mendes and Camila Cabello	We Are Not Your Kind	Slipknot
1 September	"Señorita"	Shawn Mendes and Camila Cabello	Lover	Taylor Swift
8 September	"Señorita"	Shawn Mendes and Camila Cabello	Puisque c'est écrit	Jean-Baptiste Guegan
15 September	"Señorita"	Shawn Mendes and Camila Cabello	Puisque c'est écrit	Jean-Baptiste Guegan
22 September	"Señorita"	Shawn Mendes and Camila Cabello	Puisque c'est écrit	Jean-Baptiste Guegan
29 September	"Dance Monkey"	Tones and I	Homeless Songs	Stephan Eicher
6 October	"Dance Monkey"	Tones and I	Homeless Songs	Stephan Eicher
13 October	"Dance Monkey"	Tones and I	Homeless Songs	Stephan Eicher
20 October	"Dance Monkey"	Tones and I	Ce monde est cruel	Vald
27 October	"Dance Monkey"	Tones and I	Live 2019	Mylène Farmer
3 November	"Dance Monkey"	Tones and I	Johnny	Johnny Hallyday
10 November	"Dance Monkey"	Tones and I	Johnny	Johnny Hallyday
17 November	"Dance Monkey"	Tones and I	Les vieilles canailles: L'album live	Jacques Dutronc, Johnny Hallyday and Eddy Mitchell
24 November	"Dance Monkey"	Tones and I	Courage	Celine Dion
1 December	"Dance Monkey"	Tones and I	Everyday Life	Coldplay
8 December	"Dance Monkey"	Tones and I	Les mômes et les enfants d'abord	Renaud
15 December	"Dance Monkey"	Tones and I	Thanks for the Dance	Leonard Cohen
22 December	"Dance Monkey"	Tones and I	Les mômes et les enfants d'abord	Renaud
29 December	"Dance Monkey"	Tones and I	Les mômes et les enfants d'abord	Renaud
