= List of number-one hits of 2019 (Germany) =

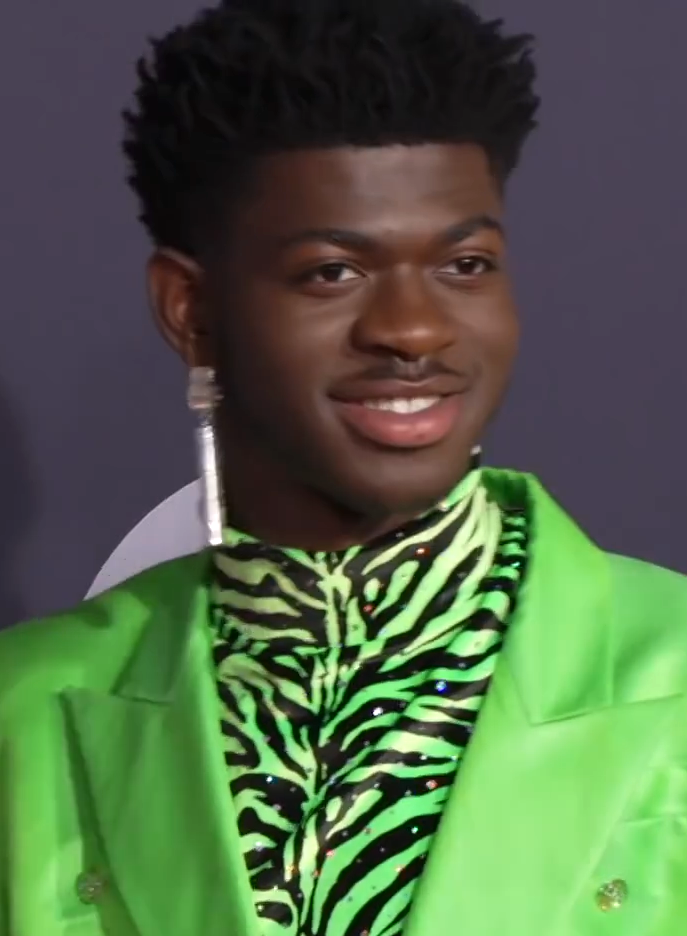
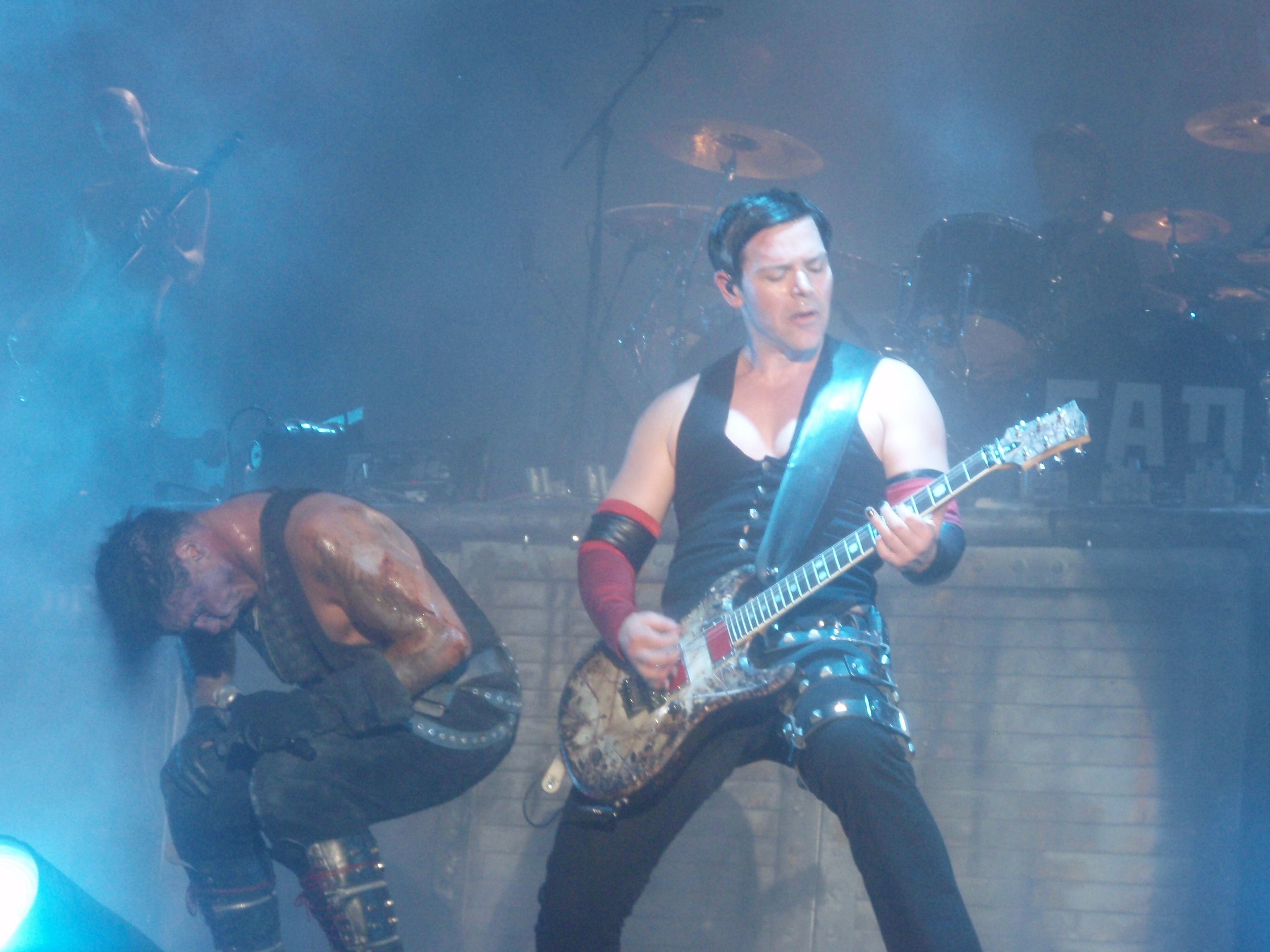
Lil Nas X's "Old Town Road" became the best-performing single of 2019, while the untitled Rammstein album became the best-performing album of the year.

The GfK Entertainment charts are record charts compiled by Media Control on behalf of the German record industry. They include the "Single Top 100" and the "Album Top 100" chart. The chart week runs from Friday to Thursday, and the chart compilations are published on Tuesday for the record industry. The entire top 100 singles and top 100 albums are officially released the following Friday by GfK Entertainment. The charts are based on sales of physical singles and albums from retail outlets as well as permanent music downloads.

== Number-one hits by week ==
Key
†	Indicates best-performing single and album of 2019

Issue date	Song	Artist	Ref.	Album	Artist	Ref.
4 January	"Sweet but Psycho"	Ava Max		MTV Unplugged 2: Live vom Atlantik (Zweimaster Edition)	Udo Lindenberg	
11 January	"Sweet but Psycho"	Ava Max		Du warst jede Träne wert	Daniela Alfinito	
18 January	"Dodi"	Shindy		MTV Unplugged 2: Live vom Atlantik (Zweimaster Edition)	Udo Lindenberg	
25 January	"Hobby Hobby"	Mero		Ritual	Oomph!	
1 February	"Prinzessa"	Capital Bra		Da nich für!	Dendemann	
8 February	"Prinzessa"	Capital Bra		Resist	Within Temptation	
15 February	"Ferrari"	Eno featuring Mero		KKS	Kool Savas	
22 February	"DNA"	KC Rebell featuring Summer Cem and Capital Bra		Moonglow	Avantasia	
1 March	"Gib ihm"	Shirin David		Distance over Time	Dream Theater	
8 March	"Gib ihm"	Shirin David		Die unendlichste Geschichte	SDP	
15 March	"Wolke 10"	Mero		Super Plus	Azet and Zuna	
22 March	"Wir ticken"	Capital Bra and Samra		Ya Hero Ya Mero	Mero	
29 March	"Cherry Lady"	Capital Bra		Morgenstund	Schiller	
5 April	"Deutschland"	Rammstein		Colucci	Fler	
12 April	"Harami"	Samra		Mosaik	Andrea Berg	
19 April	"Deutschland"	Rammstein		Trip	Mike Singer	
26 April	"Old Town Road" †	Lil Nas X		Hasso	KC Rebell	
3 May	"Old Town Road" †	Lil Nas X		CB6	Capital Bra	
10 May	"Vermissen"	Juju featuring Henning May		Berserker	Amon Amarth	
17 May	"Vermissen"	Juju featuring Henning May		Endlos Liebe	Calimeros	
24 May	"Wieder Lila"	Samra and Capital Bra		Untitled Rammstein album †	Rammstein	
31 May	"Wieder Lila"	Samra and Capital Bra		Sie wollten Wasser doch kriegen Benzin	Kontra K	
7 June	"Old Town Road" †	Lil Nas X		Herz Kraft Werke	Sarah Connor	
14 June	"Old Town Road" †	Lil Nas X		Untitled Rammstein album †	Rammstein	
21 June	"Royal Rumble"	Kalazh44, Capital Bra and Samra featuring Nimo and Luciano		Western Stars	Bruce Springsteen	
28 June	"Tilidin"	Capital Bra and Samra		Untitled Rammstein album †	Rammstein	
5 July	"Tilidin"	Capital Bra and Samra		Obststand 2	LX and Maxwell	
12 July	"Señorita"	Shawn Mendes and Camila Cabello		Untitled Rammstein album †	Rammstein	
19 July	"Zombie"	Samra and Capital Bra		Drama	Shindy	
26 July	"Señorita"	Shawn Mendes and Camila Cabello		The Great War	Sabaton	
2 August	"Señorita"	Shawn Mendes and Camila Cabello		Babylon	Die Amigos	
9 August	"Señorita"	Shawn Mendes and Camila Cabello		Rewind, Replay, Rebound	Volbeat	
16 August	"Señorita"	Shawn Mendes and Camila Cabello		Wave	Ufo361	
23 August	"Señorita"	Shawn Mendes and Camila Cabello		The Last Dance – Farewell Concert (Live at Stirling)	Runrig	
30 August	"Nummer 1"	Capital Bra and Samra		Helene Fischer live – Die Stadion-Tour	Helene Fischer	
6 September	"Roller"	Apache 207		Jetzt!	Peter Maffay	
13 September	"Kein Plan"	Loredana featuring Mero		Casanova	Fantasy	
20 September	"Dance Monkey"	Tones and I		Best of Volks-Rock'n'Roller	Andreas Gabalier	
27 September	"110"	Capital Bra, Samra and Lea		Supersize	Shirin David	
4 October	"110"	Capital Bra, Samra and Lea		Ich & keine Maske	Sido	
11 October	"Dance Monkey"	Tones and I		Berlin lebt 2	Capital Bra and Samra	
18 October	"Dance Monkey"	Tones and I		KIOX	Kummer	
25 October	"Wieso tust du dir das an?"	Apache 207		MTV Unplugged	Santiano	
1 November	"Dance Monkey"	Tones and I		Alles ohne Strom	Die Toten Hosen	
8 November	"Dance Monkey"	Tones and I		Zenit	RAF Camora	
15 November	"Dance Monkey"	Tones and I		Konturen	Johannes Oerding	
22 November	"Dance Monkey"	Tones and I		Schritte	Silbermond	
29 November	"Dance Monkey"	Tones and I		F & M	Lindemann	
6 December	"Der Bratan bleibt der gleiche"	Capital Bra		Still II	Frei.Wild	
13 December	"Kein Schlaf"	Nimo and Hava		The Christmas Present	Robbie Williams	
20 December	"Dance Monkey"	Tones and I		Alphagene II	Kollegah	
27 December	"All I Want for Christmas Is You"	Mariah Carey		Carlo Cokxxx Nutten 4	Bushido and Animus	

== See also ==
- List of number-one hits (Germany)
- List of German airplay number-one songs
