= List of best-selling singles and albums of 2019 in Ireland =

This is a list of the best selling singles, albums and as according to IRMA. Further listings can be found here.

== Top-selling singles ==
1. 'Lewis Capaldi – "Someone You Loved"
2. Lil Nas X – "Old Town Road"
3. Billie Eilish – "Bad Guy"
4. Tones and I – "Dance Monkey"
5. Dermot Kennedy – "Outnumbered"
6. Dominic Fike – "3 Nights"
7. Lady Gaga and Bradley Cooper – "Shallow"
8. Ed Sheeran and Justin Bieber – "I Don't Care"
9. Ariana Grande – "7 Rings"
10. Shawn Mendes and Camila Cabello – "Señorita"

== Top-selling albums* ==
Notes:

1. Divinely Uninspired To A Hellish Extent – Lewis Capaldi
2. The Greatest Showman – Motion Picture Cast Recording
3. When We All Fall Asleep Where Do We Go – Billie Eilish
4. Without Fear – Dermot Kennedy
5. No. 6 Collaborations Project – Ed Sheeran
6. Thank U, Next – Ariana Grande
7. A Star Is Born – Motion Picture Cast Recording
8. Bohemian Rhapsody - OST – Queen
9. Staying at Tamara's – George Ezra
10. ÷ – Ed Sheeran

Notes:

- *Compilation albums are not included.
