= List of number-one singles of 2019 (Portugal) =

The Portuguese Singles Chart ranks the best-performing singles in Portugal, as compiled by the Associação Fonográfica Portuguesa.

Number-one singles of 2019 in Portugal
Week	Song	Artist	Reference
1	"Shallow"	Lady Gaga and Bradley Cooper	
2	"Shallow"	Lady Gaga and Bradley Cooper	
3	"Tou Bem"	ProfJam featuring Lhast	
4	"7 Rings"	Ariana Grande	
5	"7 Rings"	Ariana Grande	
6	"7 Rings"	Ariana Grande	
7	"7 Rings"	Ariana Grande	
8	"7 Rings"	Ariana Grande	
9	"Shallow"	Lady Gaga and Bradley Cooper	
10	"Shallow"	Lady Gaga and Bradley Cooper	
11	"Tou Bem"	ProfJam featuring Lhast	
12	"Tou Bem"	ProfJam featuring Lhast	
13	"Bairro"	Wet Bed Gang	
14	"Bairro"	Wet Bed Gang	
15	"Bairro"	Wet Bed Gang	
16	"Bairro"	Wet Bed Gang	
17	"Bairro"	Wet Bed Gang	
18	"Bairro"	Wet Bed Gang	
19	"Bairro"	Wet Bed Gang	
20	"Bairro"	Wet Bed Gang	
21	"Old Town Road"	Lil Nas X	
22	"Old Town Road"	Lil Nas X	
23	"I Don't Care"	Ed Sheeran and Justin Bieber	
24	"I Don't Care"	Ed Sheeran and Justin Bieber	
25	"Old Town Road"	Lil Nas X	
26	"Señorita"	Shawn Mendes and Camila Cabello	
27	"Señorita"	Shawn Mendes and Camila Cabello	
28	"Señorita"	Shawn Mendes and Camila Cabello	
29	"Señorita"	Shawn Mendes and Camila Cabello	
30	"Señorita"	Shawn Mendes and Camila Cabello	
31	"Señorita"	Shawn Mendes and Camila Cabello	
32	"Señorita"	Shawn Mendes and Camila Cabello	
33	"Señorita"	Shawn Mendes and Camila Cabello	
34	"Señorita"	Shawn Mendes and Camila Cabello	
35	"Señorita"	Shawn Mendes and Camila Cabello	
36	"Señorita"	Shawn Mendes and Camila Cabello	
37	"Señorita"	Shawn Mendes and Camila Cabello	
38	"Señorita"	Shawn Mendes and Camila Cabello	
39	"Vivi Good"	Julinho KSD	
40	"Vivi Good"	Julinho KSD	
41	"Vivi Good"	Julinho KSD	
42	"Vivi Good"	Julinho KSD	
43	"Essa Saia"	Bispo featuring Ivandro	
44	"Essa Saia"	Bispo featuring Ivandro	
45	"Hoji N'ka ta Rola"	Julinho KSD	
46	"Hoji N'ka ta Rola"	Julinho KSD	
47	"Hoji N'ka ta Rola"	Julinho KSD	
48	"Dance Monkey"	Tones and I	
49	"Louco"	Piruka and Bluay	
50	"Louco"	Piruka and Bluay	
51	"Louco"	Piruka and Bluay	
52	"Louco"	Piruka and Bluay	

== See also ==
- List of number-one albums of 2019 (Portugal)
