= List of number-one hits of 2019 (Denmark) =

Tracklisten is a chart that ranks the best-performing singles and tracks in Denmark. Its data, published by IFPI Denmark and compiled by Nielsen Music Control, is based collectively on each single's weekly digital sales.

== Chart history ==
Week	Issue date	Song	Artist(s)	Ref.
53/2018	9 January	"Sweet but Psycho"	Ava Max	
1	16 January	"Kolde nætter"	Gilli	
2	23 January	"X"	KESI	
3	30 January	"Shallow"	Lady Gaga and Bradley Cooper	
4	6 February	"Shallow"	Lady Gaga and Bradley Cooper	
5	13 February	"Shallow"	Lady Gaga and Bradley Cooper	
6	20 February	"Shallow"	Lady Gaga and Bradley Cooper	
7	27 February	"Shallow"	Lady Gaga and Bradley Cooper	
8	6 March	"Shallow"	Lady Gaga and Bradley Cooper	
9	13 March	"Shallow"	Lady Gaga and Bradley Cooper	
10	20 March	"Shallow"	Lady Gaga and Bradley Cooper	
11	27 March	"Shallow"	Lady Gaga and Bradley Cooper	
12	3 April	"Paris"	Lord Siva featuring Vera	
13	10 April	"Paris"	Lord Siva featuring Vera	
14	17 April	"Paris"	Lord Siva featuring Vera	
15	24 April	"Old Town Road"	Lil Nas X	
16	1 May	"Old Town Road"	Lil Nas X	
17	8 May	"Old Town Road"	Lil Nas X	
18	15 May	"Old Town Road"	Lil Nas X	
19	22 May	"I Don't Care"	Ed Sheeran and Justin Bieber	
20	29 May	"Vai Amor"	Gilli	
21	5 June	"Vai Amor"	Gilli	
22	12 June	"Vai Amor"	Gilli	
23	19 June	"Vai Amor"	Gilli	
24	26 June	"Vai Amor"	Gilli	
25	3 July	"Vai Amor"	Gilli	
26	10 July	"Señorita"	Shawn Mendes and Camila Cabello	
27	17 July	"Señorita"	Shawn Mendes and Camila Cabello	
28	24 July	"Señorita"	Shawn Mendes and Camila Cabello	
29	31 July	"Señorita"	Shawn Mendes and Camila Cabello	
30	7 August	"Señorita"	Shawn Mendes and Camila Cabello	
31	14 August	"Señorita"	Shawn Mendes and Camila Cabello	
32	21 August	"Señorita"	Shawn Mendes and Camila Cabello	
33	28 August	"Dance Monkey"	Tones and I	
34	4 September	"Dance Monkey"	Tones and I	
35	11 September	"Dance Monkey"	Tones and I	
36	18 September	"Dance Monkey"	Tones and I	
37	25 September	"Dance Monkey"	Tones and I	
38	2 October	"Dance Monkey"	Tones and I	
39	9 October	"Dance Monkey"	Tones and I	
40	16 October	"Super Mario"	Node	
41	23 October	"Super Mario"	Node	
42	30 October	"Super Mario"	Node	
43	6 November	"Super Mario"	Node	
44	13 November	"Verden vender"	Branco and Gilli	
45	20 November	"Verden vender"	Branco and Gilli	
46	27 November	"Kærlighed"	A'Typisk featuring Gilli and KESI	
47	4 December	"Kærlighed"	A'Typisk featuring Gilli and KESI	
48	11 December	"All I Want for Christmas Is You"	Mariah Carey	
49	18 December	"Tinka"	Burhan G and Frida Brygmann	
50	25 December	"Tinka"	Burhan G and Frida Brygmann	
51	1 January 2020	"Tinka"	Burhan G and Frida Brygmann	
52	8 January 2020	"PUB G"	Lolo featuring Branco and Larry 44	
