= I Don't Care (Ed Sheeran and Justin Bieber song) =

2019 single by Ed Sheeran and Justin Bieber

Single by Ed Sheeran and Justin Bieber

from the album No.6 Collaborations Project
- Released: 10 May 2019
- Genre: Electropop; dancehall
- Length: 3:39
- Label: Asylum; Atlantic; Def Jam
- Songwriters: Ed Sheeran; Justin Bieber; Max Martin; Shellback; Fred Again; Jason Boyd
- Producers: Max Martin; Shellback; Fred Again

Ed Sheeran singles chronology
| "Amo Soltanto Te" and "This Is the Only Time" (2019) | "I Don't Care" (2019) | "Cross Me" (2019) |

Justin Bieber singles chronology
| "No Brainer" (2018) | "I Don't Care" (2019) | "Love Thru the Computer" (2019) |

Music video
- "I Don't Care" on YouTube

"I Don't Care" is a song by English singer-songwriter Ed Sheeran and Canadian singer Justin Bieber. It was released on 10 May 2019, through Asylum, Atlantic Records and Def Jam Recordings as the lead single from the former's compilation album, No.6 Collaborations Project (2019). Sheeran previewed the song on his Instagram on 5 May 2019, and Bieber shared another part of the song the following day, before both artists announced the full title and release date on 7 May.

The dancehall-influenced song peaked at number one in 26 countries (including the UK Singles Chart). It additionally peaked at number two in seven other countries (including the US Billboard Hot 100); it was blocked from reaching the summit in all those countries by Lil Nas X's and Billy Ray Cyrus's hit "Old Town Road". "I Don't Care" was certified diamond in Brazil, Canada, France and Poland, and multi-platinum in 13 additional countries.

== Background ==
"I Don't Care" marks the fourth collaboration between Sheeran and Bieber; they had both contributed guest vocals on Lil Dicky's 2019 song "Earth" for Earth Day 2019, in addition to co-writing Bieber's 2015 song "Love Yourself", and Major Lazer's 2016 song "Cold Water", which featured Bieber and Danish singer MØ.

The song was produced by Max Martin, Shellback, and Fred Again. It was Sheeran's first release of new music in two years, since his Grammy-winning album ÷ in March 2017.

== Composition ==
"I Don't Care" is performed in the key of F♯ major with a tempo of 100 beats per minute in common time. It follows a chord progression of F♯–D♯m–B–C♯, and the vocals span two octaves, from C♯_{3} to C♯_{5}. The song has been noted for its similarity to English singer Cheryl's 2014 single also titled "I Don't Care".

== Critical reception ==
Writing for The Guardian, Alexis Petridis gave the song four stars out of five, praising the synergy between two "seismic stars", who have previously collaborated on "Love Yourself", and describing the chorus as "breezily infectious." Craig Jenkins of Vulture called the lyrics "down-to-earth" and praised the combination of Bieber's "ear for pop sounds" and Sheeran's "knack for a soaring melody", noting that Bieber and Sheeran complement each other in their talents.

Writing for Pitchfork, Quinn Moreland stated that the song "just hangs around apathetically and threatens never to leave your brain."

== Promotion ==
Both Sheeran and Bieber have shared posts alluding to an upcoming release on their respective social media accounts. Bieber initially tweeted "Big fan" at Sheeran, and several days later, posted pictures of himself and Sheeran wearing Hawaiian shirts and standing in front of a green screen. Bieber also posted an edit of the pictures, with himself "spooning" Sheeran, with the caption "10". Several days later, he posted the number 7 against a black background, and the next day tweeted "6", which was reported as a countdown set to end on 10 May. The same day, Sheeran and Bieber also shared the same poll on their Instagram accounts, asking followers "Do you want new music?" with the options "Yes", "No" and "IDC".

On 5 May, Sheeran and Bieber shared a short clip of the song on their Instagram of him saying they have "new music" coming out, before showing his computer and pressing play on a file named "idc_v05.10.wav". Bieber previewed part of the same file on his Instagram after Sheeran, confirming his involvement, as well as tagging Sheeran with the caption "Friday". The full title and release date were formally announced on both artists' social media on 7 May.

== Commercial performance ==
On Spotify, "I Don't Care" which garnered astonishing 16.241 million streams in the first 24 hours, debuted with 10.977 million daily global streams, breaking the streaming platform's single-day streaming record and subsequently topping the previous record of 10.819 million, set by Mariah Carey's "All I Want for Christmas Is You". It has topped the Spotify Global chart for six weeks as of June 2019. It debuted at number one on the UK Singles Chart on 17 May 2019, becoming Sheeran's sixth and Bieber's seventh UK number one and remaining there for eight consecutive weeks. On the chart dating 25 May 2019, it debuted at number 2 on the US Billboard Hot 100 behind "Old Town Road" by Lil Nas X and Billy Ray Cyrus and stayed at that position for a second week. The song also became Sheeran's fourth number one on the Billboard Mainstream Top 40, while it marked Bieber's sixth number one on the chart. On Billboard's Dance/Mix Show Airplay, it became the second number one for Sheeran and the fifth chart-topper for Bieber.

== Music video and lyric video ==
=== Music video ===
The music video for "I Don't Care" was released on 17 May 2019. It was directed by Emil Nava, and filmed in Japan and LA.

The video was described by Liz Calvario of ET Online as a "fun and playful visual" for the song, which she described as a "feel-good track".

The music video was released on 17 May 2019.

=== Lyric video ===
The lyric video for "I Don't Care" was released on 10 May 2019.

== Credits and personnel ==
Credits adapted from Tidal.

- Ed Sheeran – vocals, songwriter
- Justin Bieber – vocals, songwriter
- Jason Boyd – songwriting
- Max Martin – backing vocals, songwriter, producer, keyboards
- Shellback – songwriter, producer, keyboards, programmer
- Fred Again – backing vocals, beatbox vocals, songwriter, producer, programmer, guitar, drums, keyboards, engineer
- Benjy Gibson – backing vocals, percussion
- Emma Corby – brass arranger
- Georgia Gibson – saxophone
- Inaam Haq – assistant
- John Hanes – engineer
- Josh Gudwin – production, recording
- Michael Ilbert – engineer
- Serban Ghenea – mixer

== Charts ==
=== Weekly charts ===
Weekly chart performance for "I Don't Care"
| Chart (2019–2021) | Peak position |
|---|---|
| Argentina (Argentina Hot 100) | 24 |
| Australia (ARIA) | 1 |
| Austria (Ö3 Austria Top 40) | 1 |
| Belgium (Ultratop 50 Flanders) | 2 |
| Belgium (Ultratop 50 Wallonia) | 2 |
| Bolivia (Monitor Latino) | 1 |
| Brazil (Top 100 Brasil) | 49 |
| Bulgaria (PROPHON) | 1 |
| Canada Hot 100 (Billboard) | 2 |
| Canada AC (Billboard) | 1 |
| Canada CHR/Top 40 (Billboard) | 1 |
| Canada Hot AC (Billboard) | 1 |
| Colombia (National-Report) | 18 |
| China Airplay/FL (Billboard) | 1 |
| Croatia (HRT) | 1 |
| CIS Airplay (TopHit) | 3 |
| Czech Republic Airplay (ČNS IFPI) | 1 |
| Czech Republic Singles Digital (ČNS IFPI) | 1 |
| Denmark (Tracklisten) | 1 |
| Estonia (Eesti Tipp-40) | 2 |
| Euro Digital Songs (Billboard) | 1 |
| Finland (Suomen virallinen lista) | 1 |
| France (SNEP) | 5 |
| Germany (GfK) | 2 |
| Global 200 (Billboard) | 105 |
| Greece (IFPI) | 1 |
| Hungary (Dance Top 40) | 9 |
| Hungary (Rádiós Top 40) | 4 |
| Hungary (Single Top 40) | 1 |
| Hungary (Stream Top 40) | 2 |
| Iceland (Tónlistinn) | 1 |
| Ireland (IRMA) | 1 |
| Israel (Media Forest) | 1 |
| Italy (FIMI) | 1 |
| Japan (Japan Hot 100) | 10 |
| Latvia (LAIPA) | 3 |
| Lebanon (Lebanese Top 20) | 2 |
| Lithuania (AGATA) | 3 |
| Luxembourg Digital Songs (Billboard) | 1 |
| Malaysia (RIM) | 1 |
| Mexico (Billboard Mexican Airplay) | 1 |
| Netherlands (Dutch Top 40) | 2 |
| Netherlands (Mega Top 50) | 1 |
| Netherlands (Single Top 100) | 1 |
| New Zealand (Recorded Music NZ) | 2 |
| Norway (VG-lista) | 1 |
| Panama (Monitor Latino) | 3 |
| Poland Airplay (ZPAV) | 3 |
| Portugal (AFP) | 1 |
| Puerto Rico (Monitor Latino) | 16 |
| Romania (Airplay 100) | 2 |
| Russia Airplay (TopHit) | 1 |
| San Marino (SMRRTV Top 50) | 47 |
| Scottish Singles Sales (Official Charts) | 1 |
| Singapore (RIAS) | 3 |
| Slovakia Airplay (ČNS IFPI) | 1 |
| Slovakia Singles Digital (ČNS IFPI) | 1 |
| Slovenia (SloTop50) | 1 |
| South Korea (Gaon) | 67 |
| Spain (PROMUSICAE) | 8 |
| Sweden (Sverigetopplistan) | 1 |
| Switzerland (Schweizer Hitparade) | 1 |
| UK Singles (Official Charts) | 1 |
| Ukraine Airplay (TopHit) | 33 |
| US Billboard Hot 100 | 2 |
| US Adult Contemporary (Billboard) | 2 |
| US Adult Pop Airplay (Billboard) | 1 |
| US Dance Airplay (Billboard) | 1 |
| US Dance Club Songs (Billboard) | 28 |
| US Pop Airplay (Billboard) | 1 |
| US Rhythmic Airplay (Billboard) | 19 |
| US Rolling Stone Top 100 | 1 |

=== Monthly charts ===
Monthly chart performance for "I Don't Care"
| Chart (2019) | Peak position |
|---|---|
| Brazil Streaming (Pro-Música Brasil) | 23 |

=== Year-end charts ===
2019 year-end chart performance for "I Don't Care"
| Chart (2019) | Position |
|---|---|
| Argentina Airplay (Monitor Latino) | 29 |
| Australia (ARIA) | 6 |
| Austria (Ö3 Austria Top 40) | 5 |
| Belgium (Ultratop Flanders) | 10 |
| Belgium (Ultratop Wallonia) | 10 |
| Canada (Canadian Hot 100) | 8 |
| CIS (Tophit) | 27 |
| Colombia (Monitor Latino) | 93 |
| Denmark (Tracklisten) | 7 |
| France (SNEP) | 31 |
| Germany (Official German Charts) | 9 |
| Hungary (Dance Top 40) | 43 |
| Hungary (Rádiós Top 40) | 26 |
| Hungary (Single Top 40) | 16 |
| Iceland (Tónlistinn) | 3 |
| Ireland (IRMA) | 8 |
| Italy (FIMI) | 21 |
| Japan (Japan Hot 100) | 94 |
| Latvia (LAIPA) | 18 |
| Malaysia (RIM) | 9 |
| Netherlands (Dutch Top 40) | 2 |
| Netherlands (Single Top 100) | 4 |
| New Zealand (Recorded Music NZ) | 6 |
| Poland (ZPAV) | 34 |
| Portugal (AFP) | 6 |
| Romania (Airplay 100) | 8 |
| Russia (Top All Media Hits, Tophit) | 27 |
| Russia (Top Radio Hits, Tophit) | 21 |
| Slovenia (SloTop50) | 8 |
| Spain (PROMUSICAE) | 22 |
| Sweden (Sverigetopplistan) | 6 |
| Switzerland (Schweizer Hitparade) | 11 |
| Tokyo (Tokio Hot 100) | 7 |
| UK Singles (OCC) | 3 |
| US Billboard Hot 100 | 16 |
| US Adult Contemporary (Billboard) | 14 |
| US Adult Top 40 (Billboard) | 3 |
| US Dance/Mix Show Airplay (Billboard) | 4 |
| US Mainstream Top 40 (Billboard) | 4 |
| US Rolling Stone Top 100 | 56 |

2020 year-end chart performance for "I Don't Care"
| Chart (2020) | Position |
|---|---|
| Australia (ARIA) | 55 |
| Canada (Canadian Hot 100) | 46 |
| Denmark (Tracklisten) | 64 |
| Hungary (Dance Top 40) | 52 |
| Hungary (Rádiós Top 40) | 35 |
| Iceland (Tónlistinn) | 36 |
| Netherlands (Single Top 100) | 99 |
| Portugal (AFP) | 47 |
| Romania (Airplay 100) | 92 |
| Russia Airplay (Tophit) | 118 |
| Sweden (Sverigetopplistan) | 75 |
| Switzerland (Schweizer Hitparade) | 79 |
| UK Singles (OCC) | 42 |
| US Adult Contemporary (Billboard) | 5 |
| US Adult Top 40 (Billboard) | 49 |

2021 year-end chart performance for "I Don't Care"
| Chart (2021) | Position |
|---|---|
| Global 200 (Billboard) | 114 |
| Portugal (AFP) | 139 |

== Certifications ==
Certifications for "I Don't Care"
| Region | Certification | Certified units/sales |
|---|---|---|
| Australia (ARIA) | 8× Platinum | 560,000^{‡} |
| Austria (IFPI Austria) | 4× Platinum | 120,000^{‡} |
| Belgium (BRMA) | 2× Platinum | 80,000^{‡} |
| Brazil (Pro-Música Brasil) | Diamond | 160,000^{‡} |
| Canada (Music Canada) | Diamond | 800,000^{‡} |
| Denmark (IFPI Danmark) | 4× Platinum | 360,000^{‡} |
| France (SNEP) | Diamond | 333,333^{‡} |
| Germany (BVMI) | 2× Platinum | 800,000^{‡} |
| Italy (FIMI) | 3× Platinum | 150,000^{‡} |
| New Zealand (RMNZ) | 7× Platinum | 210,000^{‡} |
| Norway (IFPI Norway) | 3× Platinum | 180,000^{‡} |
| Poland (ZPAV) | Diamond | 250,000^{‡} |
| Portugal (AFP) | 5× Platinum | 50,000^{‡} |
| Spain (Promusicae) | 3× Platinum | 120,000^{‡} |
| Switzerland (IFPI Switzerland) | Platinum | 20,000^{‡} |
| United Kingdom (BPI) | 5× Platinum | 3,000,000^{‡} |
| United States (RIAA) | 5× Platinum | 5,000,000^{‡} |
Streaming
| Japan (RIAJ) | Platinum | 100,000,000^{†} |
| Sweden (GLF) | 3× Platinum | 24,000,000^{†} |
^{‡} Sales+streaming figures based on certification alone.^{†} Streaming-only figures based on certification alone.

== See also ==
- List of airplay number-one hits of the 2010s (Argentina)
- List of number-one singles of 2019 (Australia)
- List of number-one hits of 2019 (Austria)
- List of number-one hits of 2019 (Denmark)
- List of number-one singles of 2019 (Finland)
- List of number-one singles of 2019 (Ireland)
- List of number-one songs of 2019 (Malaysia)
- List of number-one songs in Norway
- List of number-one singles of 2019 (Portugal)
- List of number-one singles of the 2010s (Sweden)
- List of number-one hits of 2019 (Switzerland)
- List of UK Singles Chart number ones of the 2010s
