= Señorita (Shawn Mendes and Camila Cabello song) =

2019 single by Shawn Mendes and Camila Cabello

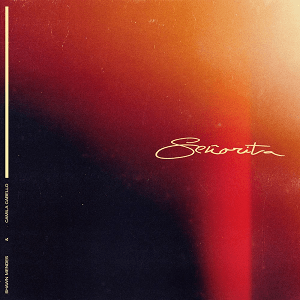

Single by Shawn Mendes and Camila Cabello
- Released: June 21, 2019
- Recorded: 2014–2018
- Studio: Arena Birmingham (Birmingham, England); Gold Tooth Music (Beverly Hills, CA); Manchester Arena (Manchester, England)
- Genre: Latin pop
- Length: 3:11
- Label: Island
- Composers: Andrew Wotman; Benjamin Levin; Alexandra Tamposi; Charlotte Aitchison; Jack Patterson; Magnus August Høiberg
- Lyricists: Shawn Mendes; Camila Cabello; Alexandra Tamposi
- Producers: Andrew Watt; Benny Blanco; Cashmere Cat

Shawn Mendes singles chronology
"If I Can't Have You" (2019)	"Señorita" (2019)	"Lover (Remix)" (2019)

Camila Cabello singles chronology
"Find U Again" (2019)	"Señorita" (2019)	"South of the Border" (2019)

Music video
- "Señorita" on YouTube

"Señorita" is a song by Canadian singer Shawn Mendes and American singer and songwriter Camila Cabello. It was released on June 21, 2019, through Island Records. This song was included on the deluxe edition of Mendes' third album, Shawn Mendes (2018), and Cabello's second album, Romance (2019). The song was written by Mendes, Cabello, Charli XCX, Ali Tamposi, Jack Patterson, and its producers Andrew Watt, Benny Blanco, and Cashmere Cat.

The song marks Mendes and Cabello's second collaboration, following "I Know What You Did Last Summer" from Mendes' debut album, Handwritten (2015). "Señorita" reached number one on the US Billboard Hot 100, as well as topping the charts in a record setting 40 countries worldwide. It is certified multiplatinum in thirteen countries, including Diamond in Australia, Brazil, Canada, France, India, and Mexico, as well as double diamond in Poland. "Señorita" received highly positive reviews from music critics. The single won an American Music Award, two MTV Video Music Awards, a People's Choice Award, and received a nomination for a Grammy Award for Best Pop Duo/Group Performance. The song was the biggest song of 2019 in Malaysia and according to the International Federation of the Phonographic Industry (IFPI), it was the third best-selling single of 2019 worldwide, with combined sales and track-equivalent streams of 16.1 million units globally. It is the 38th most streamed song on Spotify, with over 3 billion streams.

== Writing and recording ==
The song was originally conceived during a studio session between Charli XCX, Ali Tamposi, Jack Patterson of Clean Bandit, and Andrew Watt, the last of whom produced the song. Watt, prior to the studio session, created a guitar melody that he described as being reminiscent of Fleetwood Mac and José Feliciano. He played the guitar melody during the studio session where ideas for melodies and lyrics were created to accompany it. The melody and lyrics for the chorus of the song eventually formed, including what would become the opening line, "I love it when you call me señorita".

Watt sent the rough chorus of the song to Shawn Mendes, suggesting that the song be recorded as a duet, to which Mendes agreed and said that Camila Cabello would be "the only person" with whom he could do the song. Watt then sent the song to producers Benny Blanco and Cashmere Cat who liked it and began to work together on the production of the song, deciding to keep it simple to make room for the vocals.

Mendes and Cabello both made changes to the melody and lyrics to their liking. After the song's key changed and Cabello recorded some vocals, Watt had a flight to England and planned to record Mendes' vocals on a day off from his tour after his Manchester Arena show. However, Watt, to Mendes' amusement, accidentally blew the microphone by forgetting to change the conversion of power to 220V on the power box. This forced Watt to record Mendes' vocals at the Birmingham Arena, angering Mendes throughout the process because he wanted to preserve his voice for his then-upcoming shows at the O2 Arena. The end product is a Latin pop song, written in the key of A minor, with a common time tempo of 117 beats per minute (BPM), with the vocals ranging from A_{3} to F_{5}.

Mendes and Cabello had worked together on writing lyrics through FaceTime until they met up at a studio a mere few weeks before the song was released. Cabello had been tweaking lyrics and recorded vocals multiple times. Cabello conceived the lyric, "You say we're just friends but friends don't know the way you taste", as the song was already in the process of being mixed, forcing Mendes to record new vocals and sing new harmonies. Their chemistry in the studio was lauded by producer Benny Blanco, who praised their talent and "energy in the room".

== Music video ==
The song's official video was premiered on YouTube on June 21, 2019. The video, directed by Dave Meyers, filmed in Los Angeles, sees Mendes and Cabello in Miami. Cabello portrays a waitress working at a small diner, and Mendes is a newcomer to the city. They meet at the diner, and later see each other at a party. He then takes her on a motorcycle ride and they go to a hotel where they proceed to make love. In the end, however, they are separated, and it ends with Mendes looking out into the ocean and Cabello being consoled by a fellow waitress on their break. As of August 2026, it has received over 2 billion views on YouTube.

The video received positive reviews online. Teen Vogue described the music video as "steamy" and "complete with a health dose of romantic salsa dancing and heartbreak". Bustle said the song "keeps things appropriately hot and steamy". Metro in the UK called the video "sizzling".

== Promotion ==
Both Mendes and Cabello first hinted at a collaboration in December 2018. They began teasing the project on social media in June 2019, with each sharing a 20-second video teaser. They uploaded teasers of the song's music video to their social media accounts on June 19, 2019. The former confirmed it as a single later that day along with its release date and artwork.

=== Live performances ===
Mendes and Cabello performed the single at the 2019 MTV Video Music Awards on August 26, 2019. On September 5, 2019, Cabello performed an acoustic version of the song on Elle's Women in Music Party presented by Spotify in The Shed On September 6, during the Shawn Mendes: The Tour live show in Rogers Centre, Toronto, Mendes and Cabello performed "Señorita". Cabello also performed a solo version of the song at the 2019 IHeartRadio Music Festival, and at a private fan performance hosted by Verizon. On November 24, 2019, Mendes and Cabello performed the song at the American Music Awards. On September 26, 2021, Mendes and Cabello performed the song at the 2021 Global Citizen Live. On May 28, 2022, Cabello performed the song in the 2022 UEFA Champions League Final. Mendes added the single to his setlist on his fourth concert tour, Shawn Mendes: The Tour, as a medley with "I Know What You Did Last Summer"—which Cabello also features in—and "Mutual".

== Critical reception ==
Shaad D'Souza from The Fader praised the single for being effortlessly steamy and wonderfully lightweight, concluding that although Cabello is clear MVP, the song would fizzle without Mendes as her foil.

Billboard ranked the song at number 18 on their "The 100 Best Songs of 2019" list: "The mid-tempo Latin track is lightweight but a grown-up evolution for both Mendes, a former Vine star, and Cabello, the former Fifth Harmony belter. With eight writers sharing credit, it would seem like it should be a few too many cooks, but they still conjure a spicy dish: Who can forget lines like Cabello's, "You say we're just friends, but friends don't know the way you taste"?" Marie Claire placed "Señorita" on their "The Best Summer Songs of 2019" list.

Insider Inc. ranked "Señorita" at number 2 on their "The most overrated songs this year, ranked by popularity" list: "The simple fact is that "Señorita" would not have permeated our radio stations or racked up these streaming numbers if Shawn Mendes and Camila Cabello hadn't combined its release with a very PDA-focused tour." Jezebel placed it on their "The Worst Music of 2019" list.

== Commercial performance ==
"Señorita" debuted at number two on the Billboard Hot 100 on July 6, 2019. It later peaked at number one on the chart issue dated August 31, 2019, dethroning Billie Eilish's "Bad Guy", becoming Mendes' first US number-one song and Cabello's second after "Havana". Cabello became the youngest female artist to achieve a second Hot 100 number one and a fourth Mainstream Top 40 chart-topper since Rihanna (2010). It was replaced by Lizzo's "Truth Hurts" the following week. The single was the most-streamed song on Spotify in 2019 and 9th overall. It charted on the Billboard Hot 100 for 37 weeks. After the introduction of Billboard Global 200 in September 2020, "Señorita" peaked at 67 on the chart. It was certified a platinum in the US on August 23, 2019, and has been updated as 5× Platinum certification on August 3, 2023.

In the UK "Señorita" debuted at number two on the UK Official Charts and reached number one in its 3rd week on July 18, 2019, and spent 5 weeks in the top spot, it then charted for a further 40 weeks. It has been certified 4× Platinum in the UK.

In Canada "Señorita" hit number one on the Canadian Hot 100, Canada AC, Canada CHR/Top 40 and the Canada Hot AC. On the Canadian Hot 100 it hit number one on the August 31, 2019, and charted for 52 weeks.

"Señorita" reached number one in over 30 countries, including Canada, the UK, Australia and New Zealand. It made several year end charts, hitting number 10 on the UK Singles list, number 8 on ARIA charts, 9 on the New Zealand year end list, 10 on the year end Canadian Hot 100 and 15 on the US Billboard Hot 100 year end list, as well as number 15 on the US Rolling Stone Top 100 year end list.

The song has been certified Platinum in the United States by the Recording Industry Association of America, 4× Platinum in the United Kingdom by the British Phonographic Industry and 6× Platinum in Australia by the Australian Recording Industry Association. It has been certified Platinum in 3 countries, and multi-Platinum in a further 11 countries, and Diamond in Poland, France and Mexico.

As of June 2024, "Señorita" is the 18th most streamed song on Spotify with 2.75 billion streams.

== In other media ==
Jennifer Lopez and Jimmy Fallon recreated the choreography of the video of "Señorita" and other videos in a new The Tonight Show segment, "The History of Music Video Dancin". The song is featured in the dance rhythm game, Just Dance 2021. The song is featured in the film Sing 2 (2021).

== Awards and nominations ==
Year	Ceremony	Category	Result	Ref.
2019	American Music Awards	Collaboration of the Year	Won	
2019	E! People's Choice Awards	The Song of 2019	Won	
2019	E! People's Choice Awards	The Music Video of 2019	Nominated	
2019	LOS40 Music Awards	Best International Song of the Year	Nominated	
2019	Meus Prêmios Nick	Favorite International Hit	Nominated	
2019	MTV Europe Music Awards	Best Collaboration	Nominated	
2019	MTV Europe Music Awards	Best Song	Nominated	
2019	MTV Video Music Awards	Best Collaboration	Won	
2019	MTV Video Music Awards	Best Cinematography	Won	
2019	MTV Video Music Awards	Best Art Direction	Nominated	
2019	MTV Video Music Awards	Best Choreography	Nominated	
2019	MTV Video Music Awards	Song of Summer	Nominated	
2019	NRJ Music Awards	International Song of the Year	Won	
2019	Teen Choice Awards	Choice Song: Summer	Won	
2020	Grammy Awards	Best Pop Duo/Group Performance	Nominated	
2020	iHeartRadio Music Awards	Song of the Year	Nominated	
2020	iHeartRadio Music Awards	Best Collaboration	Won	
2020	iHeartRadio Music Awards	Best Lyrics	Nominated	
2020	iHeartRadio Music Awards	Best Music Video	Nominated	
2020	iHeartRadio Music Awards	Favorite Music Video Choreography	Nominated	
2020	Kids' Choice Awards	Favorite Music Collaboration	Won	
2020	Juno Awards	Single Of The Year	Won	
2020	Billboard Music Awards	Top Hot 100 Song	Nominated	
2020	Billboard Music Awards	Top Collaboration	Won	

== Track listing ==
- 7-inch vinyl, cassette single, CD single and picture disc
1. "Señorita" – 3:10
- Digital download and streaming
1. "Señorita" – 3:10

== Credits and personnel ==
Credits adapted from Tidal.

- Shawn Mendes – vocals, lyrics, composition, guitar
- Camila Cabello – vocals, lyrics, composition
- Andrew Watt – backing vocals, composition, production, programming, bass, guitar
- Benny Blanco – composition, production, programmer, keyboards
- Cashmere Cat – composition, additional production, programming, keyboards
- Ali Tamposi – lyrics, composition
- Jack Patterson – composition
- Charli XCX – composition
- Paul LaMalfa – engineering, vocal engineering
- John Hanes – mixing engineering
- Serban Ghenea – mixing
- Nathaniel Alford – vocal engineering
- Zubin Thakkar – vocal engineering
- Pedro Sisco – songwriting, lyrics, percussion, percussion programming.

== Charts ==
=== Weekly charts ===
Weekly chart performance
Chart (2019–2021)	Peak position
Argentina Hot 100 (Billboard)	7
Australia (ARIA)	1
Austria (Ö3 Austria Top 40)	1
Belgium (Ultratop 50 Flanders)	2
Belgium (Ultratop 50 Wallonia)	1
Bolivia Airplay (Monitor Latino)	3
Brazil Airplay (UBC)	1
Bulgaria Airplay (PROPHON)	1
Canada Hot 100 (Billboard)	1
Canada AC (Billboard)	1
Canada CHR/Top 40 (Billboard)	1
Canada Hot AC (Billboard)	1
Chile Airplay (Monitor Latino)	2
China Airplay/FL (Billboard)	1
CIS Airplay (TopHit)	1
Colombia Airplay (National-Report)	12
Costa Rica Airplay (Monitor Latino)	1
Croatia International Airplay (Top lista)	1
Czech Republic Airplay (ČNS IFPI)	1
Czech Republic Singles Digital (ČNS IFPI)	1
Denmark (Tracklisten)	1
Dominican Republic Airplay (Monitor Latino)	10
Ecuador Airplay (Monitor Latino)	3
El Salvador Airplay (Monitor Latino)	13
Estonia (Eesti Tipp-40)	2
Euro Digital Songs (Billboard)	1
Finland (Suomen virallinen lista)	1
France (SNEP)	2
Germany (GfK)	1
Global 200 (Billboard)	67
Greece International (IFPI)	1
Guatemala Airplay (Monitor Latino)	10
Honduras Airplay (Monitor Latino)	11
Hong Kong (HKRIA)	3
Hungary (Dance Top 40)	2
Hungary (Rádiós Top 40)	1
Hungary (Single Top 40)	1
Hungary (Stream Top 40)	1
Iceland (Tónlistinn)	1
India International (IMI)	13
Ireland (IRMA)	1
Italy (FIMI)	1
Italy Airplay (EarOne)	1
Japan Hot 100 (Billboard)	38
Latvia Streaming (LaIPA)	1
Lebanon (Lebanese Top 20)	1
Lithuania (AGATA)	1
Malaysia (RIM)	1
Mexico Airplay (Monitor Latino)	2
Netherlands (Dutch Top 40)	1
Netherlands (Single Top 100)	1
New Zealand (Recorded Music NZ)	1
Nicaragua Airplay (Monitor Latino)	1
Norway (VG-lista)	1
Panama Airplay (Monitor Latino)	1
Paraguay Airplay (Monitor Latino)	10
Peru Airplay (Monitor Latino)	6
Poland Airplay (ZPAV)	1
Portugal (AFP)	1
Puerto Rico Airplay (Monitor Latino)	6
Romania Airplay (Media Forest)	1
Russia Airplay (TopHit)	1
San Marino Airplay (SMRTV Top 50)	1
Scottish Singles Sales (Official Charts)	1
Serbia Airplay (Radiomonitor)	1
Singapore (RIAS)	1
Slovakia Airplay (ČNS IFPI)	1
Slovakia Singles Digital (ČNS IFPI)	1
Slovenia Airplay (SloTop50)	1
South Korea (Gaon)	19
Spain (Promusicae)	3
Sweden (Sverigetopplistan)	1
Switzerland (Schweizer Hitparade)	1
Ukraine Airplay (TopHit)	1
UK Singles (Official Charts)	1
Uruguay Airplay (Monitor Latino)	3
US Billboard Hot 100	1
US Adult Contemporary (Billboard)	4
US Adult Pop Airplay (Billboard)	1
US Dance Airplay (Billboard)	2
US Dance Club Songs (Billboard)	20
US Pop Airplay (Billboard)	1
US Rhythmic Airplay (Billboard)	20
US Latin Airplay (Billboard)	27
US Rolling Stone Top 100	2
Venezuela Airplay (Monitor Latino)	13

Weekly chart performance
Chart (2022)	Peak position
CIS Airplay (TopHit)	102
Ukraine Airplay (TopHit)	38

Weekly chart performance
Chart (2023)	Peak position
CIS Airplay (TopHit)	97
Estonia Airplay (TopHit)	120
Kazakhstan Airplay (TopHit)	119
Moldova Airplay (TopHit)	90
Romania Airplay (TopHit)	67
Russia Airplay (TopHit)	188
Ukraine Airplay (TopHit)	91

Weekly chart performance
Chart (2024)	Peak position
CIS Airplay (TopHit)	102
Estonia Airplay (TopHit)	59
Kazakhstan Airplay (TopHit)	114
Moldova Airplay (TopHit)	157
Romania Airplay (TopHit)	70
Russia Airplay (TopHit)	174
Ukraine Airplay (TopHit)	137

Weekly chart performance
Chart (2025)	Peak position
Moldova Airplay (TopHit)	61
Ukraine Airplay (TopHit)	71

Weekly chart performance
Chart (2026)	Peak position
Lithuania Airplay (TopHit)	92
Moldova Airplay (TopHit)	91

=== Monthly charts ===
Monthly chart performance
Chart (2019)	Peak position
Argentina (CAPIF)	4
Brazil Streaming (Pro-Música Brasil)	7
CIS Airplay (TopHit)	1
Czech Republic Airplay (ČNS IFPI)	2
Czech Republic Singles Digital (ČNS IFPI)	1
Paraguay Airplay (SGP)	32
Russia Airplay (TopHit)	1
Slovakia Airplay (ČNS IFPI)	1
Slovakia Singles Digital (ČNS IFPI)	1
Slovenia Airplay (SloTop50)	1
Ukraine Airplay (TopHit)	2

Monthly chart performance
Chart (2020)	Peak position
CIS Airplay (TopHit)	33
Czech Republic Airplay (ČNS IFPI)	3
Czech Republic Singles Digital (ČNS IFPI)	13
Russia Airplay (TopHit)	58
Slovakia Airplay (ČNS IFPI)	22
Slovakia Singles Digital (ČNS IFPI)	31
Ukraine Airplay (TopHit)	4

Monthly chart performance
Chart (2021)	Peak position
CIS Airplay (TopHit)	78
Czech Republic Airplay (ČNS IFPI)	27
Slovakia Airplay (ČNS IFPI)	30
Ukraine Airplay (TopHit)	35

Monthly chart performance
Chart (2022)	Peak position
Czech Republic Airplay (ČNS IFPI)	64
Slovakia Airplay (ČNS IFPI)	84
Ukraine Airplay (TopHit)	99

Monthly chart performance
Chart (2023)	Peak position
Romania Airplay (TopHit)	81

Monthly chart performance
Chart (2024)	Peak position
Estonia Airplay (TopHit)	67
Romania Airplay (TopHit)	84

Monthly chart performance
Chart (2025)	Peak position
Moldova Airplay (TopHit)	97
Romania Airplay (TopHit)	99

Monthly chart performance
Chart (2026)	Peak position
Moldova Airplay (TopHit)	89

=== Year-end charts ===
Year-end chart performance
Chart (2019)	Position
Argentina Airplay (Monitor Latino)	6
Australia (ARIA)	8
Austria (Ö3 Austria Top 40)	4
Belgium (Ultratop Flanders)	5
Belgium (Ultratop Wallonia)	7
Bolivia Airplay (Monitor Latino)	11
Canada (Canadian Hot 100)	10
Chile Airplay (Monitor Latino)	23
Colombia Airplay (Monitor Latino)	57
CIS Airplay (TopHit)	9
Costa Rica Airplay (Monitor Latino)	16
Denmark (Tracklisten)	8
Dominican Republic Airplay (Monitor Latino)	43
Ecuador Airplay (Monitor Latino)	34
El Salvador Airplay (Monitor Latino)	49
France (SNEP)	18
Germany (Official German Charts)	7
Guatemala Airplay (Monitor Latino)	48
Honduras Airplay (Monitor Latino)	53
Hungary (Dance Top 40)	23
Hungary (Rádiós Top 40)	22
Hungary (Single Top 40)	3
Hungary (Stream Top 40)	3
Iceland (Tónlistinn)	2
Ireland (IRMA)	10
Italy (FIMI)	20
Latvia Streaming (LaIPA)	3
Malaysia International Streaming (RIM)	1
Mexico Airplay (Monitor Latino)	9
Netherlands (Dutch Top 40)	5
Netherlands (Single Top 100)	5
New Zealand (Recorded Music NZ)	9
Nicaragua Airplay (Monitor Latino)	21
Panama Airplay (Monitor Latino)	14
Paraguay Airplay (Monitor Latino)	52
Paraguay Airplay (SGP)	32
Peru Airplay (Monitor Latino)	47
Poland Airplay (ZPAV)	7
Portugal (AFP)	7
Puerto Rico Airplay (Monitor Latino)	31
Romania (Airplay 100)	7
Russia Airplay (TopHit)	9
Slovenia Airplay (SloTop50)	6
South Korea (Gaon)	68
Spain (Promusicae)	16
Sweden (Sverigetopplistan)	11
Switzerland (Schweizer Hitparade)	4
Ukraine Airplay (TopHit)	43
UK Singles (OCC)	10
Uruguay Airplay (Monitor Latino)	17
US Billboard Hot 100	15
US Adult Contemporary (Billboard)	27
US Adult Top 40 (Billboard)	18
US Dance/Mix Show Airplay (Billboard)	13
US Mainstream Top 40 (Billboard)	11
Venezuela Airplay (Monitor Latino)	69
US Rolling Stone Top 100	15

Year-end chart performance
Chart (2020)	Position
Argentina Airplay (Monitor Latino)	13
Australia (ARIA)	68
Belgium (Ultratop Flanders)	70
Belgium (Ultratop Wallonia)	90
Brazil Airplay (Crowley)	75
Canada (Canadian Hot 100)	17
CIS Airplay (TopHit)	43
Denmark (Tracklisten)	56
France (SNEP)	82
Hungary (Dance Top 40)	22
Hungary (Rádiós Top 40)	32
Hungary (Single Top 40)	55
Hungary (Stream Top 40)	30
Netherlands (Single Top 100)	96
Poland Airplay (ZPAV)	92
Romania Airplay (Media Forest)	66
Russia Airplay (TopHit)	92
Switzerland (Schweizer Hitparade)	36
Ukraine Airplay (TopHit)	16
UK Singles (OCC)	75
US Billboard Hot 100	44
US Adult Contemporary (Billboard)	8
US Adult Top 40 (Billboard)	28

Year-end chart performance
Chart (2021)	Position
CIS Airplay (TopHit)	90
Global 200 (Billboard)	80
Hungary (Rádiós Top 40)	69
India International (IMI)	13
Portugal (AFP)	167
Ukraine Airplay (TopHit)	49

Year-end chart performance
Chart (2022)	Position
CIS Airplay (TopHit)	149
Global Excl. US (Billboard)	131
Ukraine Airplay (TopHit)	106

Year-end chart performance
Chart (2023)	Position
CIS Airplay (TopHit)	136
Estonia Airplay (TopHit)	122
Romania Airplay (TopHit)	149

Year-end chart performance
Chart (2024)	Position
CIS Airplay (TopHit)	160
Estonia Airplay (TopHit)	97

Year-end chart performance
Chart (2025)	Position
CIS Airplay (TopHit)	170
Estonia Airplay (TopHit)	150

== Certifications ==
Region	Certification	Certified units/sales
Australia (ARIA)	10× Platinum	700,000^{‡}
Austria (IFPI Austria)	4× Platinum	120,000^{‡}
Belgium (BRMA)	3× Platinum	120,000^{‡}
Brazil (Pro-Música Brasil)	8× Diamond	1,280,000^{‡}
Canada (Music Canada)	Diamond	800,000^{‡}
Denmark (IFPI Danmark)	4× Platinum	360,000^{‡}
France (SNEP)	Diamond	333,333^{‡}
Germany (BVMI)	3× Gold	900,000^{‡}
India (IMI)	71× Platinum	8,520,000
Italy (FIMI)	4× Platinum	280,000^{‡}
Mexico (AMPROFON)	Diamond+2× Platinum+Gold	450,000^{‡}
New Zealand (RMNZ)	6× Platinum	180,000^{‡}
Norway (IFPI Norway)	4× Platinum	240,000^{‡}
Poland (ZPAV)	2× Diamond	500,000^{‡}
Portugal (AFP)	4× Platinum	40,000^{‡}
Spain (Promusicae)	5× Platinum	300,000^{‡}
United Kingdom (BPI)	4× Platinum	2,400,000^{‡}
United States (RIAA)	5× Platinum	5,000,000^{‡}
Streaming
Japan (RIAJ)	Gold	50,000,000^{†}
South Korea (KMCA)	Platinum	100,000,000^{†}
Sweden (GLF)	2× Platinum	16,000,000^{†}
^{‡} Sales+streaming figures based on certification alone.^{†} Streaming-only figures based on certification alone.

== Release history ==
Region	Date	Format	Label	Ref.
Various	June 21, 2019	Digital download; streaming	Island	
Australia	June 21, 2019	Contemporary hit radio	Island; UMA	
United States	June 24, 2019	Hot adult contemporary	Island; Republic	
United States	June 25, 2019	Contemporary hit radio	Island; Republic	
United States	September 25, 2019	7-inch vinyl; CD single	Island; Universal	
Canada	September 25, 2019	7-inch vinyl; CD single	Island; Universal	
United Kingdom	September 25, 2019	7-inch vinyl; CD single	Island; Universal	
United States	September 25, 2019	Picture disc; cassette single	Island; Universal	

== See also ==
- List of airplay number-one hits of the 2010s (Argentina)
- List of Billboard Argentina Hot 100 top-ten singles in 2019
- List of Billboard Hot 100 number-one singles of 2019
- List of Canadian Hot 100 number-one singles of 2019
- List of most-streamed songs on Spotify
- List of number-one singles of 2019 (Australia)
- List of number-one hits of 2019 (Austria)
- List of number-one singles of 2019 (Belgium)
- List of number-one hits of 2019 (Denmark)
- List of number-one singles of 2019 (Finland)
- List of number-one hits of 2019 (Germany)
- List of number-one singles of the 2010s (Hungary)
- List of number-one singles of 2019 (Ireland)
- List of number-one hits of 2019 (Italy)
- List of number-one songs of 2019 (Malaysia)
- List of number-one singles of 2019 (Netherlands)
- List of number-one singles from the 2010s (New Zealand)
- List of number-one songs in Norway
- List of number-one singles of 2019 (Poland)
- List of number-one singles of 2019 (Portugal)
- List of number-one songs of the 2010s (Romania)
- List of number-one songs of 2019 (Singapore)
- List of number-one singles of 2019 (Spain)
- List of number-one singles of the 2010s (Sweden)
- List of number-one hits of 2019 (Switzerland)
- List of UK Singles Chart number ones of the 2010s
- List of highest-certified singles in Australia
