= Hobby Hobby =

Single by Mero

from the album Ya Hero Ya Mero
- Released: 18 January 2019
- Length: 2:33
- Label: Groove Attack TraX
- Songwriter: Enes Meral
- Producer: Josh Petruccio

Mero singles chronology
"Baller los" (2018)	"Hobby Hobby" (2019)	"Ferrari" (2019)

Music video
- "Hobby Hobby" on YouTube

"Hobby Hobby" is a song recorded by German rapper Mero, released on 18 January 2019, through Groove Attack TraX. Written by the rapper himself and produced by Josh Petruccio, the track acts as the second single for his debut studio album Ya Hero Ya Mero (2019). An accompanying music video for the song was directed by Plug, Jakub and Tatjana of the 100Blackdolphins and uploaded by onto Mero's YouTube channel simultaneously with the single's release. Commercially, the single debuted atop the German single charts and broke multiple streaming records, including the most streams in Germany within one week, accumulating nearly ten million streams.

== Background and composition ==
"Hobby Hobby" was announced by Mero a day prior to its release, through a teaser on his social media services. The track was written by himself and produced by Josh Petruccio, who previously produced Mero's first single, "Baller los".

== Music video ==
The music video for "Hobby Hobby" was directed by Plug, Jakub and Tatjana of the 100Blackdolphins and released on 18 January 2019. The video was viewed more than 3,1 million times on YouTube, within the first 24 hours, breaking the record by "Melodien" of Capital Bra and Juju.

== Commercial performance ==
"Hobby Hobby" debuted atop the German singles chart on the issue dated 25 January 2019, his second single to do so. The single also broke the record for most streams in one day and one week in Germany, accumulating more than 2.1 million and nearly 10 million streams, respectively.

== Charts ==
=== Weekly charts ===
Chart (2019)	Peak position
Austria (Ö3 Austria Top 40)	1
Germany (GfK)	1
Switzerland (Schweizer Hitparade)	2

=== Year-end charts ===
Chart (2019)	Position
Austria (Ö3 Austria Top 40)	66
Germany (Official German Charts)	47

== Certifications ==
Region	Certification	Certified units/sales
Austria (IFPI Austria)	Gold	15,000^{‡}
Germany (BVMI)	Gold	200,000^{‡}
^{‡} Sales+streaming figures based on certification alone.

== See also ==
- List of number-one hits of 2019 (Germany)
