= Old Town Road =

2018 debut single by Lil Nas X

Single by Lil Nas X

from the EP 7
- Released: December 3, 2018 (original); April 5, 2019 (Billy Ray Cyrus remix)
- Recorded: December 2, 2018
- Studio: CinCoYo (Atlanta, Georgia)
- Genre: Trap; country trap; Southern hip-hop
- Length: 1:53 (original version); 2:37 (Billy Ray Cyrus remix)
- Label: Columbia
- Songwriters: Montero Hill; Trent Reznor; Atticus Ross; Kiowa Roukema
- Producers: YoungKio; Trent Reznor; Atticus Ross

Lil Nas X singles chronology
"Same Shit (Freestyle)" (2018)	"Old Town Road" (2018)	"Panini" (2019)

Audio video
- "Old Town Road" on YouTube

Remix cover
- Billy Ray Cyrus remix cover

Billy Ray Cyrus singles chronology
"Achy Breaky Heart 25" (2017)	"Old Town Road" (remix) (2019)	"Chevys and Fords" (2019)

Remix music video
- "Old Town Road (Remix)" on YouTube

"Old Town Road" is the debut mainstream single by the American rapper and singer Lil Nas X, first released independently in December 2018. After gaining popularity, the single was re-released by Columbia Records in March 2019. He also recorded a remix with American country singer Billy Ray Cyrus, which was released on April 5, 2019. Both were included on Lil Nas X's second studio extended play (EP), 7 (2019). The song was recorded on December 2, 2018, at CinCoYo, based in Atlanta, Georgia. The song has been widely viewed as "country rap", a somewhat rare musical style not often heard in the mainstream prior to this song's release. Dutch record producer YoungKio composed the instrumental and made it available for purchase online in 2018. It features a sample of "34 Ghosts IV" by the American industrial rock band Nine Inch Nails. The sample was placed behind trap-style Roland TR-808 drums and bass. Lil Nas X purchased the instrumental for US$30 and recorded "Old Town Road" in one day. At the time, he had been living with his sister after dropping out of college; his real-world struggles were an influence on some of the lyrics.

The song initially gained popularity on the video sharing app TikTok and eventually entered the Billboard charts in March 2019. The song also reached number 19 on the Billboard Hot Country Songs chart before the magazine disqualified it from the chart on the grounds that it did not "fit" the genre, sparking a debate on what constitutes the "definition" of country music. Though "Old Town Road" did not re-enter any country charts, both versions of the song collectively peaked at number one on the Billboard Hot 100, remaining at the top for a record-breaking 19 consecutive weeks (later surpassed non-consecutively by Ella Langley's "Choosin' Texas" and Mariah Carey's "All I Want for Christmas Is You"); the remix peaked at no. 50 on Billboard's Country Airplay chart. One or more versions of "Old Town Road" have topped the national singles charts in Australia, Canada, France, Germany, Ireland, the Netherlands, New Zealand, Norway, Switzerland and the United Kingdom, and have charted in the top 10 in various other international markets.

The song was certified diamond by the Recording Industry Association of America (RIAA) in October 2019 for selling 10 million total units in the United States, the fastest song to be certified diamond. It was also certified Diamond in Canada, France, Poland, and Germany. At the 62nd Annual Grammy Awards, the remix (featuring Billy Ray Cyrus) was nominated for Record of the Year and won Best Pop Duo/Group Performance and Best Music Video. In October 2019, Columbia Records and Sony Music Entertainment won the Music & Sound Recordings Award from SAG-AFTRA for "work that exemplifies equal access" to LGBTQ individuals and "other misrepresented or underrepresented groups." In September 2021, the song set the record for the second-highest certified song in history by the RIAA (behind Post Malone and Swae Lee's "Sunflower"), at 16× platinum in the United States—meaning it accumulated 16 million equivalent song units. The single has sold over 18 million copies worldwide, making it one of the best-selling singles of all time. Rolling Stone named it the 490th greatest song of all time in the 2021 edition of its 500 Greatest Songs of All Time list.

== Background and recording ==
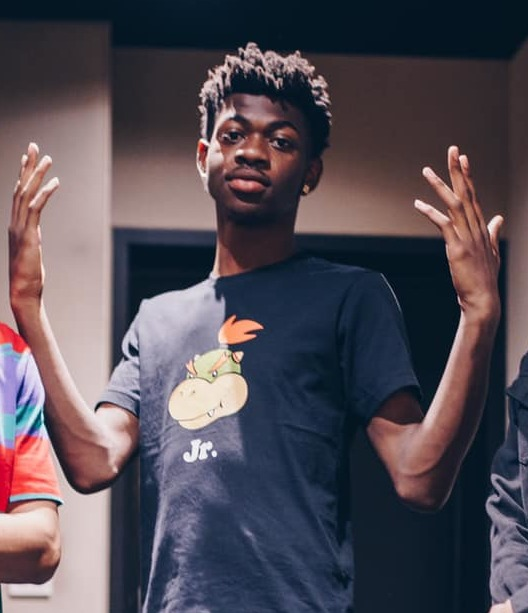
Lil Nas X (pictured) leased the beat for "Old Town Road" anonymously on an online store from producer YoungKio for $30.

Country rap, and its subgenre, country trap, emerged onto the mainstream following the American rapper Young Thug's experimental mixtape Beautiful Thugger Girls (2017). Lil Nas X has cited Young Thug as a pioneer of country trap. In May 2018, Lil Tracy and Lil Uzi Vert ignited the trend with their country rap single "Like a Farmer (Remix)".

In 2018, Lil Nas X dropped out of college to pursue a music career even though he was discouraged by his parents. He moved in with his sister, spending time promoting his music on the Internet while having just three hours of sleep each night. Lil Nas X found the beat for "Old Town Road" in October 2018 and began writing after his sister told him he had to move out soon. Lil Nas X felt like he was "out of options" and said that his sister's and parents' frustrations with him inspired the song's chorus, "can't nobody tell me nothing". Within a month of writing it, Lil Nas X chose to alter the song's meaning so that the "old town road" would be a symbol of success. Lil Nas X recorded the song on December 2, 2018, at the CinCoYo Recording Studio in Atlanta, and released it the same day on SoundCloud under the title "Old Town Road (I Got the Horses in the Back)".

The Dutch record producer YoungKio produced the beat a year before the song's release and uploaded it as Future Type Beat to his online store for selling beats. He sampled Nine Inch Nails' track "34 Ghosts IV" after finding it from his YouTube algorithm's suggested videos. YoungKio downloaded the song and imported the file to FL Studio, chopping up the Nine Inch Nails sample and filtering it so that it sounded like an old field recording, then reordering sections in an effort to make the austere original more catchy and adding drums underneath. He had never heard of Nine Inch Nails before stumbling upon "34 Ghosts IV". YoungKio did not have the intention of the beat being country related and did not see it as a country music instrumental. Lil Nas X bought the beat from YoungKio for $30, but since purchases on his online store were anonymous, YoungKio did not know the song was purchased by Lil Nas X until he saw it in an Instagram meme in December 2018. Nine Inch Nails founder Trent Reznor later said that, shortly after the song began gaining traction, he received a call from Lil Nas X's manager about the sample, asking for clearance to use it, which he granted. He described the song as "undeniably hooky".

On December 4, 2018, a day after the original version's release, Lil Nas X tweeted that he wanted Billy Ray Cyrus on the song. Lil Nas X knew of Cyrus because of his role on the Disney Channel television series Hannah Montana. The country singer Jake Owen was originally approached to co-write and record the first remix of "Old Town Road". The Columbia Records executive, Ron Perry, reached out to Cyrus' wife Tish Cyrus saying that he would love it if Cyrus were to hear "Old Town Road". Cyrus first heard the song over coffee on March 16, 2019, when Tish played it to him. Cyrus explained that he loved the original song the first time he heard it. Cyrus also mentioned that he related to the song the first time he heard it, connecting the "old town road" to the Old Town Bridge in Argillite, Kentucky, that he used to play on as a child. In response to Billboard removing "Old Town Road" from the Hot Country Songs chart, Cyrus tweeted his support for Lil Nas X and noted that the removal put him in the ranks of great outlaws.

== Composition ==
"Old Town Road (Remix)"
Sample of "Old Town Road (Remix)" featuring parts of Lil Nas X singing the chorus and Billy Ray Cyrus' verse, displaying the mixture of country and hip hop blended together to make the song

"Old Town Road" has been variously described by publications as a country rap, trap, pop, country, rock Southern hip hop, or country trap song. Lil Nas X himself said that he regards it as the latter. Produced by YoungKio, "Old Town Road" samples Nine Inch Nails' track "34 Ghosts IV" from their sixth studio album Ghosts I–IV (2008). The song prominently features the playing of a banjo along with trap-style Roland TR-808 drums and bass throughout. It has been compared to Lil Tracy's 2018 single "Like a Farmer", which was later remixed by Lil Uzi Vert. The song is composed in the key of G♯ minor with a chord progression of G♯m-B^{add9}-F♯-C♯m7. It has an approximate tempo of 68 beats per minute.

== Release and promotion ==
"Old Town Road" was released independently as a single on December 3, 2018; this was during the rise of the "Yeehaw Agenda" meme, a movement inspired by cowboy fashion and culture. Danny Kang, the manager of the viral country artist Mason Ramsey, suggested to Rolling Stone that Lil Nas X listed the song under the country music genre on SoundCloud and iTunes as a way to manipulate chart algorithms, as it would be easier to top the country charts than the dominant hip hop/rap charts. Lil Nas X began creating memes to promote "Old Town Road" before it was picked up by TikTok users. The song's first music video is composed entirely of footage and clips from the 2018 Western action-adventure game, Red Dead Redemption 2.

The song gained traction in late December 2018 after becoming the "Yeehaw Challenge" meme on TikTok, where users created short videos set to the song. The challenge is credited with launching the song to enter the Billboard Hot 100 at number 83, the chart on which the song has since peaked at number one. The song's popularity grew so quickly that radio stations had to download the audio from YouTube. On March 22, 2019, the success of the song allowed Lil Nas X to sign to Columbia Records, which now distributes the single.

The first official remix of "Old Town Road", featuring the American country singer Billy Ray Cyrus, was released on April 5, 2019, by Columbia Records. The remix was recorded in support of "Old Town Road" being recognized as a country song. A limited edition 7-inch vinyl single was made available for purchase on May 1, 2019, with the remix on the A-side and the original on the B-side. The remix was eventually included with the original on Lil Nas X's second EP, 7. The music video for the remix was released on May 17, 2019. It was directed by Calmatic, and has guest appearances by Chris Rock, HaHa Davis, Rico Nasty, Diplo, Jozzy, Young Kio and Vince Staples.

On March 29, 2019, Lil Nas X danced to "Old Town Road" with the Atlanta Hawks cheerleaders during a basketball game at State Farm Arena. On April 29, 2019, Lil Nas X and Cyrus performed the live debut of "Old Town Road" as part of Diplo's set at the Stagecoach Festival. On June 24, 2019, Lil Nas X and Cyrus performed the song together on a saloon-themed stage for the 2019 BET Awards. On January 26, 2020, Lil Nas X performed "Old Town Road" at the 62nd Annual Grammy Awards with Diplo, BTS, Mason Ramsey and Billy Ray Cyrus, before finishing his performance with the remix of "Rodeo" along with Nas.

== Commercial performance ==
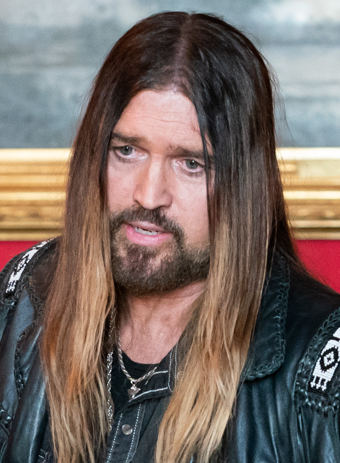
Assisted by a remix featuring Billy Ray Cyrus (pictured), "Old Town Road" charted at number one on the Billboard Hot 100 for a record-setting nineteen weeks.

In the United States, the original version of "Old Town Road" reached number one on the Billboard Hot 100 in the week ending April 13, 2019; at one minute and 53 seconds in length, it became the shortest number-one single since "I'm Henry VIII, I Am" by Herman's Hermits in 1965 and the fifth-shortest in the history of the chart. In the following week, it and the newly released remix featuring Billy Ray Cyrus received a combined 143 million streams, surpassing Drake's "In My Feelings", which in the previous year had amassed 116.2 million in the same period, as the song with the highest single-week streaming figure in the country. This song also became Cyrus's biggest hit in the U.S. since "Achy Breaky Heart" peaked at number four on the Billboard Hot 100 27 years prior. "Old Town Road" continued to exceed 100 million streams in each of the eight following weeks, and in June 2019, was responsible for the three highest weekly U.S. streaming totals in the history of digital music, as well as nine of the eleven highest overall. In October 2019, "Old Town Road" became the fastest single in RIAA history to receive diamond certification in the United States. The certification, which is awarded to singles that attain national combined sales and streams of ten million units, was achieved by the song in its eleventh month of release. The single had sold 1.6 million digital copies in the United States by February 2020.

"Old Town Road" topped the Hot 100 for 19 consecutive weeks from April 13 to August 17, 2019. On August 24, it was finally unseated by Billie Eilish's "Bad Guy" which had waited in the runner-up spot for nine nonconsecutive weeks. "Old Town Road" holds the record for the most consecutive weeks at number one on the Hot 100 chart, surpassing the previous record of 16 weeks achieved by both "One Sweet Day" by Mariah Carey and Boyz II Men (1995–96), and "Despacito" by Luis Fonsi and Daddy Yankee featuring Justin Bieber (2017). Mariah Carey's "All I Want for Christmas Is You" broke its record for longest-running number one song (which it held with Shaboozey's "A Bar Song (Tipsy)", which tied its record with 19 non-consecutive weeks at number one in November 2024) in December 2025, achieving 20 non-consecutive weeks at number one on the chart dated December 20, 2025 ("Christmas" has since achieved 22 non-consecutive weeks at number one as of the chart dated January 3, 2026). In July 2019, "Old Town Road" also became the first number-one single on the Rolling Stone Top 100 chart when it held the position in the chart's inaugural edition. In accordance with their methodologies, Billboard and Rolling Stone each assign a single position to "Old Town Road" on their respective charts by combining the performance figures of every released version of the song determined to be sufficiently similar to the original. The former publication credits the entirety of the song's chart run solely to the remix featuring Cyrus.

Elsewhere, the original version of the song topped the national singles charts in at least ten other countries — Australia (thirteen weeks), France and Norway (eight weeks each), Austria (six weeks); Switzerland (five weeks), Denmark, Germany and Ireland (four weeks each), Portugal (three weeks), and the United Kingdom (two weeks) — and charted within the top ten in more than five others. The remix featuring Cyrus achieved a record 19-weeks run at number one on the Canadian Hot 100, and peaked within the top five in more than five other markets.

=== Genre controversy ===
Billboard (logo illustrated) controversially removed "Old Town Road" from its Hot Country Songs chart after it debuted at number 19.

"Old Town Road" achieved a rare feat in Billboard history when it simultaneously charted on the Billboard Hot 100, Hot Country Songs and Hot R&B/Hip-Hop Songs charts in March 2019. (Note: While at least one source claims that this was the first instance, there has been at least one other song to achieve that: "We Are the World", which appeared on six charts simultaneously, the aforementioned three plus the dance, adult contemporary and rock charts.) However, Billboard quietly removed "Old Town Road" from its Hot Country chart for "not [embracing] enough elements of today's country music". Had it not been disqualified, "Old Town Road" would have been the Hot Country Songs number-one song, in the chart dated April 6, 2019. Lil Nas X said he was "extremely disappointed" by the decision. In an interview, Time reporter Andrew R. Chow brought up Billboard's decision to remove "Old Town Road" from the country chart but to keep it on the R&B/Hip-Hop chart, asking Lil Nas X if he considered "Old Town Road" a country song. Lil Nas X replied, "The song is country trap. It's not one, it's not the other. It's both. It should be on both [charts]." Lil Nas X submitted the song for consideration in rap categories at the 62nd Annual Grammy Awards; however, the award show's rap committee recategorized it in Best Pop Duo/Group Performance, where it ultimately won.

The exclusion of "Old Town Road" brought criticism of the evaluation of the work of non-white artists in the country genre, with the Rolling Stone writer Elias Leight referring to Beyoncé, another black artist, whose song "Daddy Lessons" failed to be considered a country song by The Recording Academy in 2016. Leight also pointed out other difficulties faced by black artists making cross-genre music, noting that the rapper Juice Wrld's Death Race for Love (2019) would "probably be the most commercially successful rock album of 2019", but would never appear on rock charts or playlists, another genre, like country, predominated by white artists. In the music journalist Robert Christgau's opinion, "Taking 'Old Town Road' off the country chart strikes me as racist pure and simple, because country radio remains racist regardless of the Darius Ruckers and Kane Browns it makes room for." In light of the criticism, Billboard later stated that the decision to remove "Old Town Road" from the Hot Country Songs chart had nothing to do with Lil Nas X's race. When asked if he believed the decision by Billboard had any racial undertones, Lil Nas X replied, "I believe whenever you're trying something new, it's always going to get some kind of bad reception."

Despite being removed from the main Country Songs chart, "Old Town Road" managed to chart on Billboard's Country Airplay chart, entering at number 53 and peaking at number 50. In response, Sony Music Nashville CEO Randy Goodman told Billboard that his team had started testing the song in some country radio markets, adding "it would be negligent not to look at it".

== Music video ==
There are two music videos accompanying the song: the "Official Video" and an extended cut, the "Official Movie", released before the official video. Both videos are directed by Calmatic and contains guest appearances from Chris Rock, Haha Davis, Rico Nasty, Diplo, Jozzy, the song's producer YoungKio, and Vince Staples. It has accumulated over 718 million views on YouTube for the official movie, and a billion views for its official video. At the 62nd Annual Grammy Awards, where Lil Nas X performed the song, the video won in the Grammy Award for Best Music Video category. The video was additionally nominated for an American Music Award in the Favorite Music Video category, and was nominated for several awards at the 2019 MTV Video Music Awards.

== Legacy ==
=== Other remixes ===
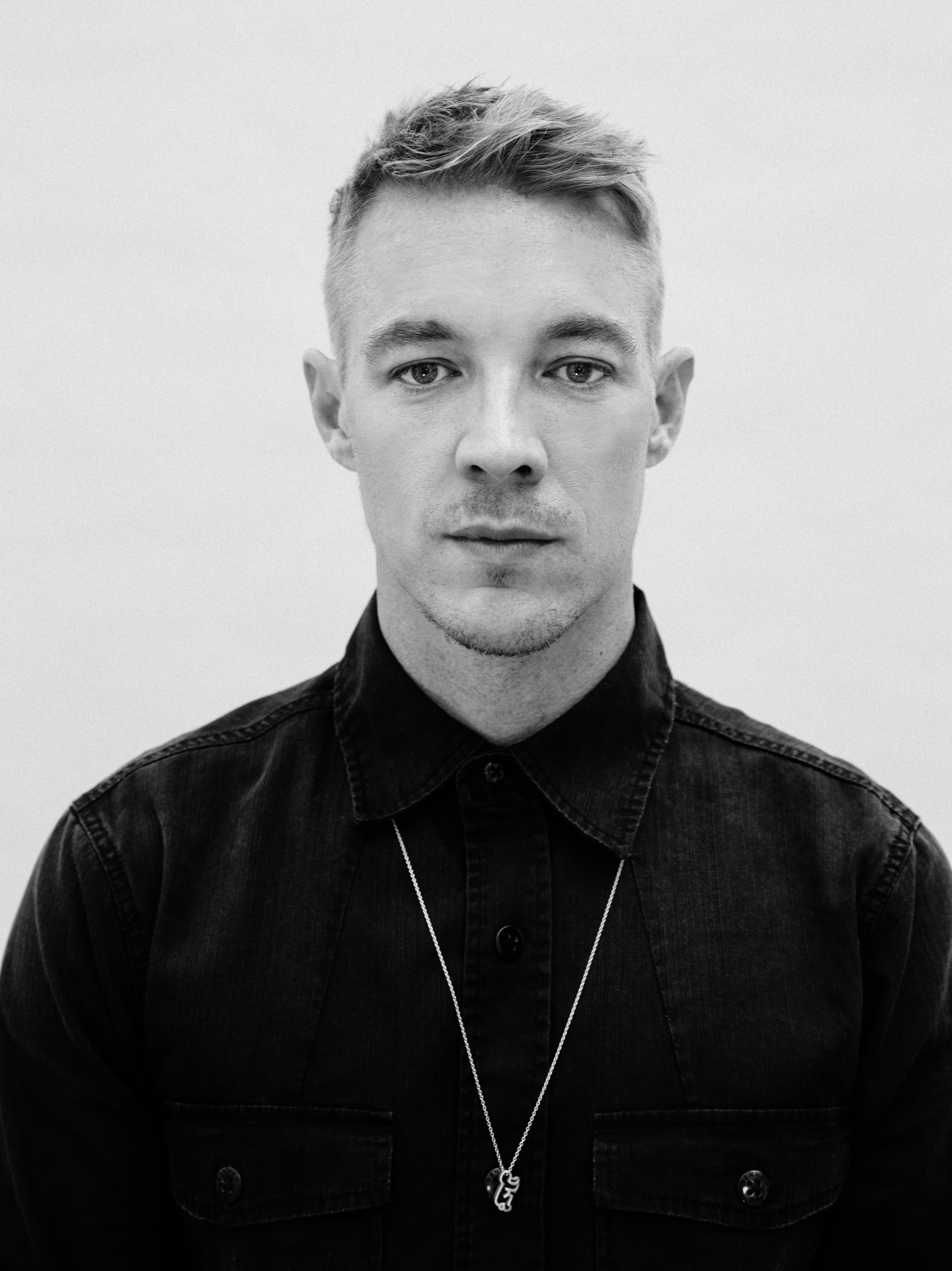
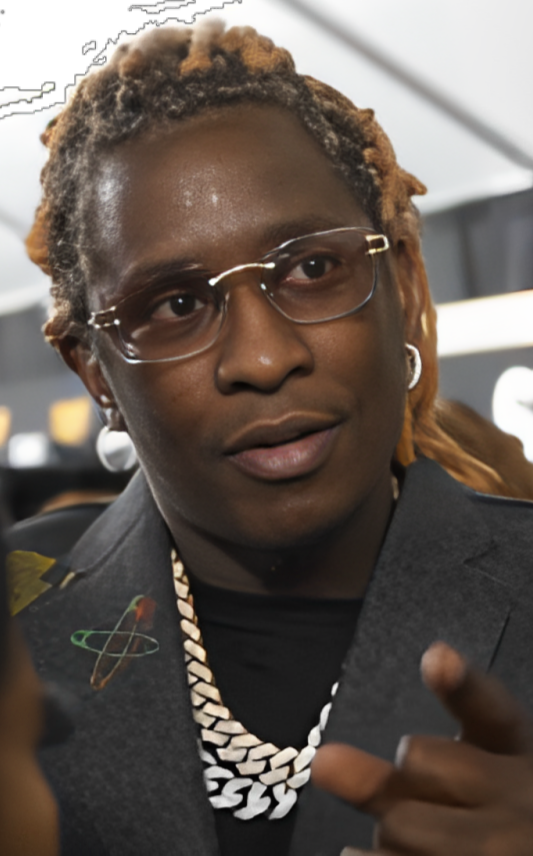
Diplo (left) and Young Thug (right) had each experimented with country music before their respective "Old Town Road" remixes

==== Diplo remix ====
The single's second official remix, "Old Town Road (Diplo Remix)", was released on April 29, 2019, with additional production by the American DJ Diplo. The country music website, The Boot, described it as a "remix of [a] remix" as it still retained vocals from Billy Ray Cyrus. The remix was premiered at Diplo's set for the country music Stagecoach Festival alongside the first-ever live performance of "Old Town Road" by Lil Nas X and Cyrus. Just before Lil Nas X and Cyrus' surprise on-stage appearance at Stagecoach 2019, Diplo claimed. "Let me tell you, ["Old Town Road" is] a country song." The Diplo remix peaked at number 24 on the RMNZ New Zealand Hot Singles chart. The remix is included on Diplo's second studio album, Diplo Presents Thomas Wesley, Chapter 1: Snake Oil (2020).

==== Young Thug remix ====
A third official remix, titled "Old Town Road (Remix)", was released on July 12, 2019. It retains Cyrus' guest appearance and adds the American rapper Young Thug and the American singer Mason Ramsey. The remix was released in an effort to keep "Old Town Road" at number one on the Billboard Hot 100, as the song was two weeks away from tying for the all-time Hot 100 record held by "One Sweet Day" by Mariah Carey and Boyz II Men and "Despacito" by Luis Fonsi featuring Daddy Yankee; it has since broken that record. In an interview with Billboard in March 2019, the producer YoungKio said that he would want Young Thug for a remix of "Old Town Road", saying, "I've listened to every single song of his, and I think he's qualified to do this remix. I've listened to Beautiful Thugger Girls, and he has some country vibes on there." Young Thug has been previously credited with bringing country trap into the mainstream with his experimental mixtape, Beautiful Thugger Girls (2017). Lil Nas X called him a pioneer of bridging the gap between country and trap.

==== RM of BTS remix ====
The single's fourth official remix, "Old Town Road (Seoul Town Road Remix)", featuring the South Korean rapper RM of BTS was released on July 24, 2019. It is the only official remix to not feature Cyrus. Lil Nas X announced shortly afterwards that "Seoul Town Road" would be the final remix. It reached number eight on the RMNZ New Zealand Hot Singles chart.

==== Unofficial releases ====
Fellow American country singer Jake Owen and fellow American rapper Lil Wayne both recorded verses for planned remixes that were unofficially released. Owen's remix was shared on The Bobby Bones Show in May 2019 and his verse was later replaced by Ramsey. Lil Wayne's remix was leaked on July 25, 2019, and he performed it live at Lollapalooza the next month. The American rapper Cupcakke released her leaked remix of "Old Town Road", titled "Old Town Hoe", on April 17, 2019. The remix reinterprets the lyric "I'm gonna ride 'til I can't no more" in a sexually explicit way. A music video was released in May 2019 and has Cupcakke and her backup dancers riding toy horses and handling phallic objects, including lollipops, water bottles and corn on the cob. Lil Nas X responded favorably to the remix.

=== Covers and parodies ===
The actor-comedian Omi Vaidya parodied the song with "Oak Tree Road", a song about Asian Indian culture in the US. Postmodern Jukebox also covered the song, doing it in the style of a New Orleans blues song. Miche Braden sang the lead vocals. The song was featured in an episode of The Proud Family: Louder and Prouder, titled "Old Towne Road", with Lil Nas X guest starring as one of the voices. Rather than Billy Ray Cyrus' section of the song, the character of Bobby Proud, voiced by Cedric the Entertainer, joins in with newly written lyrics. The song was included in "Weird Al" Yankovic's 2024 polka medley "Polkamania!".

== Awards and nominations ==
Listed below are awards and nominations for both "Old Town Road" and "Old Town Road (Remix)" featuring Billy Ray Cyrus.

Year	Ceremony	Category	Result	Ref.
2019	American Music Awards	Collaboration of the Year	Nominated	
2019	American Music Awards	Favorite Song — Rap/Hip-Hop	Won	
2019	American Music Awards	Favorite Music Video	Nominated	
2019	American Music Awards	Favorite Song — Pop/Rock	Nominated	
2019	Apple Music Awards	Song of the Year	Won	
2019	BBC Radio 1's Teen Awards	Best Single	Nominated	
2019	BET Hip Hop Awards	Single of the Year	Won	
2019	BET Hip Hop Awards	Best Collab, Duo or Group	Won	
2019	Country Music Association Awards	Musical Event of the Year	Won	
2019	Danish Music Awards	Foreign Song of the Year	Nominated	
2019	MTV Europe Music Awards	Best Song	Nominated	
2019	MTV Europe Music Awards	Best Video	Nominated	
2019	MTV Europe Music Awards	Best Collaboration	Nominated	
2019	MTV Video Music Awards	Song of the Year	Won	
2019	MTV Video Music Awards	Song of Summer	Nominated	
2019	MTV Video Music Awards	Video of the Year	Nominated	
2019	MTV Video Music Awards	Best Hip-Hop Video	Nominated	
2019	MTV Video Music Awards	Best Collaboration	Nominated	
2019	MTV Video Music Awards	Best Direction	Won	
2019	MTV Video Music Awards	Best Editing	Nominated	
2019	MTV Video Music Awards	Best Art Direction	Nominated	
2019	NRJ Music Awards	International Song of the Year	Nominated	
2019	NRJ Music Awards	Video of the Year	Nominated	
2019	People's Choice Awards	Song of 2019	Nominated	
2019	Teen Choice Awards	Choice Song: Male Artist	Nominated	
2019	Teen Choice Awards	Choice Collaboration	Nominated	
2019	Teen Choice Awards	Choice Song: R&B/Hip-Hop	Won	
2019	UK Music Video Awards	Best Urban Video – International	Nominated	
2020	Grammy Awards	Record of the Year	Nominated	
2020	Grammy Awards	Best Pop Duo/Group Performance	Won	
2020	Grammy Awards	Best Music Video	Won	
2020	Billboard Music Awards	Top Hot 100 Song	Won	
2020	Billboard Music Awards	Top Streaming Song	Won	
2020	Billboard Music Awards	Top Selling Song	Won	
2020	Billboard Music Awards	Top Collaboration (fan-voted)	Nominated	
2020	Billboard Music Awards	Top Rap Song	Won	

== Track listing ==
Vinyl release

Side A
No.	Title	Length
1.	"Old Town Road" (featuring Billy Ray Cyrus)	2:38

Side B
No.	Title	Length
1.	"Old Town Road" (original version)	1:53

== Credits and personnel ==
Credits and personnel for "Old Town Road" and the four official remixes adapted from Tidal.

=== Original recording ===
- Lil Nas X – lead artist, songwriter
- YoungKio – producer, songwriter
- Trent Reznor – producer, songwriter
- Atticus Ross – producer, songwriter
- Cinco – recording engineer

=== Remixes ===
- Billy Ray Cyrus – featured artist, songwriter (remixes 1–3)
- Jocelyn "Jozzy" Donald – background vocals, songwriter (remixes 1–3)
- Andrew "VoxGod" Bolooki – vocal producer, mix engineer (remixes 1–3)
- Joe Grasso – engineer (remixes 1–3)
- Eric Lagg – mastering engineer (remixes 1–3)
- Diplo – re-mixer (remix 2)
- Young Thug – featured artist, songwriter (remix 3)
- Mason Ramsey – featured artist, songwriter (remix 3)
- Jake Owen – background vocals, songwriter (remix 3)
- Ernest K. Smith – songwriter (remix 3)
- A Bainz – recording engineer (remix 3)
- Shaan Singh – recording engineer (remix 3)
- Alex Tumay – vocal producer (remix 3)
- Joey Moi – vocal producer (remix 3)
- RM – featured artist, songwriter (remix 4)

== Charts ==
=== Weekly charts ===
Chart performance for "Old Town Road" (solo or featuring Billy Ray Cyrus)
Chart (2019–2021)	Peak position
Argentina Hot 100 (Billboard)	77
Australia (ARIA)	1
Austria (Ö3 Austria Top 40)	1
Belgium (Ultratop 50 Flanders)	1
Belgium (Ultratop 50 Wallonia)	1
Bolivia (Monitor Latino)	5
Brazil (Top 100 Brasil)	65
Brazil (União Brasileira de Compositores)	8
Bulgaria (PROPHON)	2
Canada Hot 100 (Billboard)	1
Canada CHR/Top 40 (Billboard)	6
Canada Hot AC (Billboard)	22
China Airplay/FL (Billboard)	1
CIS Airplay (TopHit)	21
Colombia (National-Report)	48
Croatia (HRT)	40
Czech Republic Airplay (ČNS IFPI)	82
Czech Republic Singles Digital (ČNS IFPI)	2
Denmark (Tracklisten)	1
Estonia (Eesti Ekspress)	3
Euro Digital Song Sales (Billboard)	2
Finland (Suomen virallinen lista)	5
France (SNEP)	1
Germany (GfK)	1
Global 200 (Billboard)	70
Greece (IFPI)	2
Hungary (Dance Top 40)	4
Hungary (Rádiós Top 40)	8
Hungary (Single Top 40)	1
Hungary (Stream Top 40)	1
Iceland (Tónlistinn)	7
Ireland (IRMA)	1
Israel (Media Forest)	4
Italy (FIMI)	3
Latvia (LAIPA)	2
Lithuania (AGATA)	2
Luxembourg Digital Songs (Billboard)	1
Malaysia (RIM)	11
Mexico Airplay (Billboard)	20
Netherlands (Dutch Top 40)	5
Netherlands (Single Top 100)	1
New Zealand (Recorded Music NZ)	1
Norway (VG-lista)	1
Poland Airplay (ZPAV)	8
Portugal (AFP)	1
Romania (Airplay 100)	4
Russia Airplay (TopHit)	25
Scottish Singles Sales (Official Charts)	1
Singapore (RIAS)	12
Slovakia Airplay (ČNS IFPI)	18
Slovakia Singles Digital (ČNS IFPI)	2
Slovenia (SloTop50)	30
Spain (PROMUSICAE)	62
Sweden (Sverigetopplistan)	2
Switzerland (Schweizer Hitparade)	1
Ukraine Airplay (TopHit)	52
UK Singles (Official Charts)	1
UK Hip Hop/R&B (Official Charts)	1
US Billboard Hot 100	1
US Adult Pop Airplay (Billboard)	16
US Country Airplay (Billboard)	50
US Dance Club Songs (Billboard)	34
US Dance Airplay (Billboard)	1
US Hot Country Songs (Billboard)	19
US Hot R&B/Hip-Hop Songs (Billboard)	1
US R&B/Hip-Hop Airplay (Billboard)	2
US Pop Airplay (Billboard)	3
US Rhythmic Airplay (Billboard)	1
US Rolling Stone Top 100	1

=== Monthly charts ===
Monthly chart performance
Chart (2019)	Peak position
Brazil Streaming (Pro-Música Brasil)	2

=== Year-end charts ===
Year-end chart performance
Chart (2019)	Position
Australia (ARIA)	1
Austria (Ö3 Austria Top 40)	3
Belgium (Ultratop Flanders)	2
Belgium (Ultratop Wallonia)	1
Canada (Canadian Hot 100)	1
CIS (Tophit)	64
Denmark (Tracklisten)	3
France (SNEP)	1
Germany (Official German Charts)	1
Hungary (Dance Top 40)	49
Hungary (Rádiós Top 40)	100
Hungary (Single Top 40)	6
Iceland (Tónlistinn)	23
Ireland (IRMA)	2
Italy (FIMI)	17
Latvia (LAIPA)	5
Netherlands (Dutch Top 40)	34
Netherlands (Single Top 100)	2
New Zealand (Recorded Music NZ)	1
Poland (ZPAV)	35
Portugal (AFP)	3
Romania (Airplay 100)	16
Russia Airplay (Tophit)	61
Sweden (Sverigetopplistan)	4
Switzerland (Schweizer Hitparade)	2
Tokyo (Tokio Hot 100)	96
UK Singles (OCC)	2
US Billboard Hot 100	1
US Adult Top 40 (Billboard)	50
US Dance/Mix Show Airplay (Billboard)	11
US Hot R&B/Hip-Hop Songs (Billboard)	1
US Hot Rap Songs (Billboard)	1
US Mainstream Top 40 (Billboard)	22
US Rhythmic (Billboard)	12
US Rolling Stone Top 100	1
Worldwide (IFPI)	2

Chart (2020)	Position
Australia (ARIA)	53
Belgium (Ultratop Flanders)	76
Belgium (Ultratop Wallonia)	74
Canada (Canadian Hot 100)	25
France (SNEP)	78
Hungary (Dance Top 40)	23
Hungary (Rádiós Top 40)	50
Hungary (Stream Top 40)	55
Portugal (AFP)	110
Romania (Airplay 100)	93
Switzerland (Schweizer Hitparade)	49
UK Singles (OCC)	81

Chart (2021)	Position
Global 200 (Billboard)	74

=== Decade-end charts ===
Decade-end chart performance
Chart (2010–2019)	Position
Australia (ARIA)	56
Netherlands (Single Top 100)	32
UK Singles (Official Charts Company)	75
US Billboard Hot 100	7
US Hot R&B/Hip-Hop Songs (Billboard)	27

=== All-time charts ===
All-time chart performance
Chart	Position
US Billboard Hot 100	41

== Certifications ==
Region	Certification	Certified units/sales
Australia (ARIA)	15× Platinum	1,050,000^{‡}
Austria (IFPI Austria)	4× Platinum	120,000^{‡}
Belgium (BRMA)	4× Platinum	160,000^{‡}
Brazil (Pro-Música Brasil)	3× Diamond	480,000^{‡}
Brazil (Pro-Música Brasil) Seoul Town Road Remix	Platinum	40,000^{‡}
Canada (Music Canada)	Diamond	800,000^{‡}
Denmark (IFPI Danmark)	3× Platinum	270,000^{‡}
France (SNEP)	Diamond	333,333^{‡}
Germany (BVMI)	Diamond	1,000,000^{‡}
Italy (FIMI)	2× Platinum	100,000^{‡}
Mexico (AMPROFON)	Diamond+4× Platinum+Gold	570,000^{‡}
Netherlands (NVPI)	3× Platinum	240,000^{‡}
New Zealand (RMNZ)	9× Platinum	270,000^{‡}
Norway (IFPI Norway)	2× Platinum	120,000^{‡}
Norway (IFPI Norway) Remix	2× Platinum	120,000^{‡}
Poland (ZPAV)	Diamond	100,000^{‡}
Portugal (AFP)	4× Platinum	40,000^{‡}
Spain (Promusicae)	Gold	20,000^{‡}
Switzerland (IFPI Switzerland)	5× Platinum	100,000^{‡}
United Kingdom (BPI)	5× Platinum	3,000,000^{‡}
United States (RIAA)	17× Platinum	17,000,000^{‡}
United States (RIAA) Diplo Remix	Gold	500,000^{‡}
Streaming
Sweden (GLF)	2× Platinum	16,000,000^{†}
Summaries
Worldwide	—	18,400,000
^{‡} Sales+streaming figures based on certification alone.^{†} Streaming-only figures based on certification alone.

== See also ==
- List of best-selling singles in Australia
- List of best-selling singles and albums of 2019 in Ireland
- List of number-one singles of 2019 (Australia)
- List of number-one hits of 2019 (Austria)
- List of Canadian Hot 100 number-one singles of 2019
- List of number-one hits of 2019 (Denmark)
- List of number-one hits of 2019 (Germany)
- List of number-one singles of the 2010s (Hungary)
- List of number-one singles of 2019 (Ireland)
- List of number-one singles from the 2010s (New Zealand)
- List of number-one songs in Norway
- List of number-one hits of 2019 (Switzerland)
- List of UK Singles Chart number ones of the 2010s
- List of Billboard Hot 100 number-one singles of 2019
- List of Billboard Hot 100 top 10 singles in 2019
- List of number-one dance airplay hits of 2019 (U.S.)
- List of Billboard Rhythmic number-one songs of the 2010s
- List of viral music videos
