= Semino Rossi =

Argentine-Tyrolean schlager singer

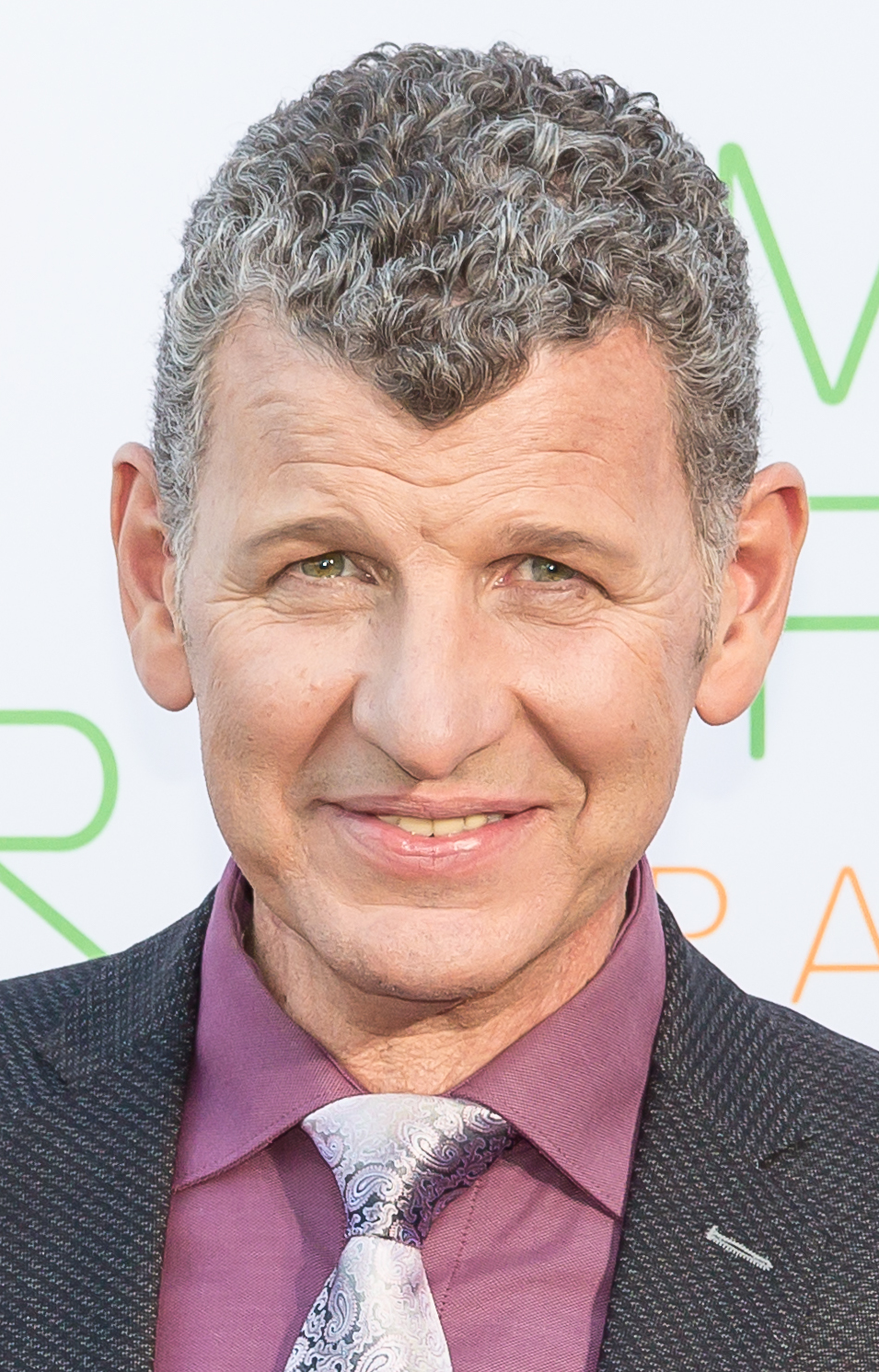
Semino Rossi

Semino Rossi (born 29 May 1962, at Rosario, Argentina) is an Argentine-Tyrolean schlager singer. He has sold more than 10 million records and has reached top charts in Austria with six of his albums. He mostly sings in German.

== Early life and career ==
Semino Rossi was born in Argentina in 1962, the son of a tango singer and a pianist. He received piano lessons from his mother and learned guitar by himself. In 1985, he came to Austria via Spain, originally earned his living as a street musician, later with engagements in hotels in Spain, Italy, Switzerland and Austria. In Germany, he became known in 2004 with his appearances at the local Winterfest der Volksmusik ("folk music winter festival").

In the spring of 2007, he completed his first solo tour with his own band through Germany and Austria. In July 2008, the single Rot sind die Rosen was released, which reached 53rd in Austria and 52nd in Germany. His eighth studio album Symphonie des Lebens, released in March 2013, was produced by Dieter Bohlen and went double-platinum in Austria. In 2017, his ninth album Ein Teil von mir was released, which reached number 1 in Austria and went platinum and reached number 4 with gold in Germany. In July 2019, his tenth studio album So ist das Leben was released, which reached the first chart in Austria and Switzerland and second in Germany.

== Discography ==
=== Albums ===
Studio albums

Album	Release	Peak positions						Certification
Album	Release	AUT	BEL (Fl)	DEN	GER	NED	SWI	Certification
Alles aus Liebe	February 2004	10	–	–	30	–	54	GER: 2× Platinum
Tausend Rosen für Dich	May 2005	2	–	–	7	–	24	GER: 2× Platinum
Du mein Gefühl	September 2005; November 2006 (2nd release)	18	–	–	–	–	–	
Feliz Navidad	November 2005; October 2006 (Special edition)	10	151	–	30	–	75	GER: Gold
Ich denk an Dich	July 2006; October 2006 (Special edition)	1	90	–	1	–	2	GER: 2× Platinum
Einmal Ja - Immer Ja	September 2007	1	74	7	4	74	7	GER: 5× Gold
Die Liebe bleibt	2009	1	25	–	2	31	6	2× Platinum; AT: 2× Platinum
Augenblicke	2011	2	13	–	6	44	9	
Symphonie des Lebens	2013	1	17	34	2	27	9	AT: 2× Platinum
Amor – Die schönsten Liebeslieder aller Zeiten	2015	3	14	–	11	61	12	
Ein Teil von mir	2017	1	16	–	4	–	2	
So ist das Leben	2019	1	7	–	2	–	1	
Heute hab ich Zeit für dich	2022	1	15	–	2	–	3	
Magische Momente	2024	2	47	–	6	–	–	
Blanca Navidad – Weiße Weihnacht	2025	28	–	–	94	–	90	

Live albums

Album	Release	Peak positions			Certification
Album	Release	AUT	NED	SWI	Certification
Live in Wien	2007	15	–	–	
Einmal ja – immer ja	2008	23	–	–	
Die Liebe Bleibt (Live)	2008	7	57	20	

Compilation albums

Album	Release	Peak positions	Certification
Album	Release	DEN	Certification
Best Of	March 2014	3	

=== Singles ===
Single	Release	Peak positions		Album
Single	Release	AUT	GER	Album
"Rot sind die Rosen"	2008	53	52	
