= União Brasileira de Compositores =

União Brasileira de Compositores was founded on 22 June 1942 as a union, specialized in the administration of the rights of musical composers, mainly aiming at the defense and distribution of royalties income, and cultural development.

Its members include composers, authors, music publishers, interpreters, musicians and phonographic producers (record labels). UBC also includes famous artists such as Milton Nascimento and Gilberto Gil.

One of its main activities today is to represent its associates with ECAD – Central Office of Collection of Copyrights, created in 1973.

According to UBC surveys only nine women are on the list of the top 100 copyright collectors in Brazilian music. The survey also showed that income as an interpreter for women has an economic importance of 25.1%, while for men it has 13.5%, and that both genders earn more as composers, in this case, men earn 76.5%, and women 65.3%.

Since 2017 UBC annually honors Brazilian composers through the UBC Award. The first winner of the award was Gilberto Gil, Erasmo Carlos was honored in 2018 and Milton Nascimento in 2019.

== Charts ==
=== Top 10 Streaming ===
Since 6 January 2019 UBC began publishing rankings on the songs that perform the most by counting streaming in the country from the exclusive data of Crowley Broadcast Analysis, they being the Top 10 Radios and the Top 10 Streaming to give more prominence to composers from Brazil and abroad.

=== Top 10 Radio ===
On the same date that the Top 10 Streaming was released the organization also started publishing a ranking of the 10 most played songs on Brazilian radio, also by data from Crowley Broadcast Analysis. The Top 10 Radios is basically the top 10 songs on the Top 100 Brazil chart updated weekly on the Crowley website.
