= Berlin lebt 2 =

Studio album by Capital Bra and Samra
- Released: 4 October 2019
- Length: 50:59
- Language: German
- Label: Urban; Bra Music
- Producer: Beatzarre; Djorkaeff; Greckoe; 27th; B-Case; Lukas Piano; Lucry; Wim Treuner

Capital Bra chronology
CB6 (2019)	Berlin lebt 2 (2019)	CB7 (2020)

Samra chronology
Travolta EP (2019)	Berlin lebt 2 (2019)	Jibrail & Ibils (2020)

Singles from Berlin lebt 2
- 1. "Tilidin" Released: 21 June 2019; 2. "Zombie" Released: 12 July 2019; 3. "Nummer 1" Released: 23 August 2019; 4. "Huracan" Released: 6 September 2019; 5. "110" Released: 20 September 2019; 6. "Berlin lebt wie nie zuvor" Released: 4 October 2019

Berlin lebt 2 ("Berlin Is Alive 2") is the first collaborative studio album by German rappers Capital Bra and Samra. It was released on 4 October 2019 through Bra Music and Urban. The album serves as a continuation of Capital Bra's fourth studio album Berlin lebt (2018).

The album was preceded by five singles, four of which debuted at number one in Germany. The fifth single "110" became Capital Bra's eighteenth and Samra's tenth number-one single in Germany. Additionally, the rappers reached number one in Germany for the sixth time as a duo. The sixth and final single "Berlin lebt wie nie zuvor" was released alongside the album.

== Background ==
On 8 May 2019, only four weeks after the release of his sixth studio album CB6, Capital Bra announced the collaborative project with Samra. The official release date was announced on 20 June 2019. Subsequently, the release of Samra's debut studio album Smoking Kill was pushed back to 2020. He renamed his album to "Jibrail und Iblis". The first single "Tilidin" was released on 21 June 2019 and reached number one in all of the German-speaking countries. Over the course of the next three months, the track was followed up by the release of the singles "Zombie", "Nummer 1", "Huracan" and "110". During an Instagram livestream on 10 July 2019, Capital Bra announced that works on the album have been finished. The cover art was revealed in August 2019. On 13 August 2019, two months before release, it was reported that all of the box sets accompanying the release of the album were sold out.

== Promotion ==
Both rappers embarked on the Berlin lebt 2 tour starting on 28 April 2020.

== Track listing ==
No.	Title	Writer(s)	Producer(s)	Length
1.	"Berlin lebt wie nie zuvor"	Vladislav Balovatsky; Hussein Akkouche	Beatzarre; Djorkaeff	2:31
2.	"Tilidin"	Balovatsky; Akkouche; Greckoe	Beatzarre; Djorkaeff	2:52
3.	"Tranquillo"	Balovatsky; Akkouche	Beatzarre; Djorkaeff; Lukas Piano	2:45
4.	"Nummer 1"	Balovatsky; Akkouche	Beatzarre; Djorkaeff	2:35
5.	"Kalt Bruder"	Balovatsky; Akkouche	27th; B-Case; Beatzarre; Djorkaeff	2:45
6.	"Kriminal 2"	Balovatsky; Akkouche	Beatzarre; Djorkaeff; Lukas Piano	3:20
7.	"So alleine"	Balovatsky; Akkouche	Beatzarre; Djorkaeff	2:42
8.	"Safe"	Balovatsky; Akkouche	Beatzarre; Djorkaeff	2:32
9.	"Mr. Miyagi"	Balovatsky; Akkouche	Beatzarre; Djorkaeff	2:29
10.	"110" (with Lea)	Balovatsky; Akkouche; Beatzarre; Djorkaeff; Lea; Robin Haefs; Wim Treuner	Beatzarre; Djorkaeff	3:14
11.	"Huracan"	Balovatsky; Akkouche	Beatzarre; Djorkaeff; Greckoe; Lukas Piano	3:02
12.	"Satellit"	Balovatsky; Akkouche	Beatzarre; Djorkaeff	2:49
13.	"Milly 9"	Balovatsky; Akkouche	Lucry	3:02
14.	"Purple Rain" (with Santos)	Balovatsky; Akkouche; Haefs; Santos	B-Case; Beatzarre; Djorkaeff	3:27
15.	"Pam Pam Pam" (with Kalazh44)	Balovatsky; Akkouche; Kalazh44	Beatzarre; Djorkaeff	2:34
16.	"Zombie"	Balovatsky; Akkouche; Greckoe	Beatzarre; Djorkaeff; Greckoe; Lukas Piano	2:56
17.	"Colombiana"	Balovatsky; Akkouche	Beatzarre; Djorkaeff; Lukas Piano	2:48
18.	"Lieber Gott"	Balovatsky; Akkouche	Beatzarre; Djorkaeff; Wim Treuner	2:36
Total length:				50:59

== Charts ==
=== Weekly charts ===
Weekly chart performance for Berlin lebt 2
Chart (2019)	Peak position
Austrian Albums (Ö3 Austria)	1
German Albums (Offizielle Top 100)	1
Swiss Albums (Schweizer Hitparade)	1

=== Year-end charts ===
Year-end chart performance for Berlin lebt
Chart (2019)	Position
Austrian Albums (Ö3 Austria)	23
German Albums (Offizielle Top 100)	24
Swiss Albums (Schweizer Hitparade)	21
Chart (2020)	Position
Austrian Albums (Ö3 Austria)	29
German Albums (Offizielle Top 100)	55
Swiss Albums (Schweizer Hitparade)	44

== Certifications ==
Certifications for Berlin lebt 2
Region	Certification	Certified units/sales
Germany (BVMI)	Gold	100,000^{‡}
^{‡} Sales+streaming figures based on certification alone.

== Release history ==
Release history for Berlin lebt 2
Region	Date	Format	Label	Ref.
Various	4 October 2019	CD; Download; streaming	Bra Music; Urban	
