= Mero (rapper) =

German rapper (born 2000)

Enes Meral
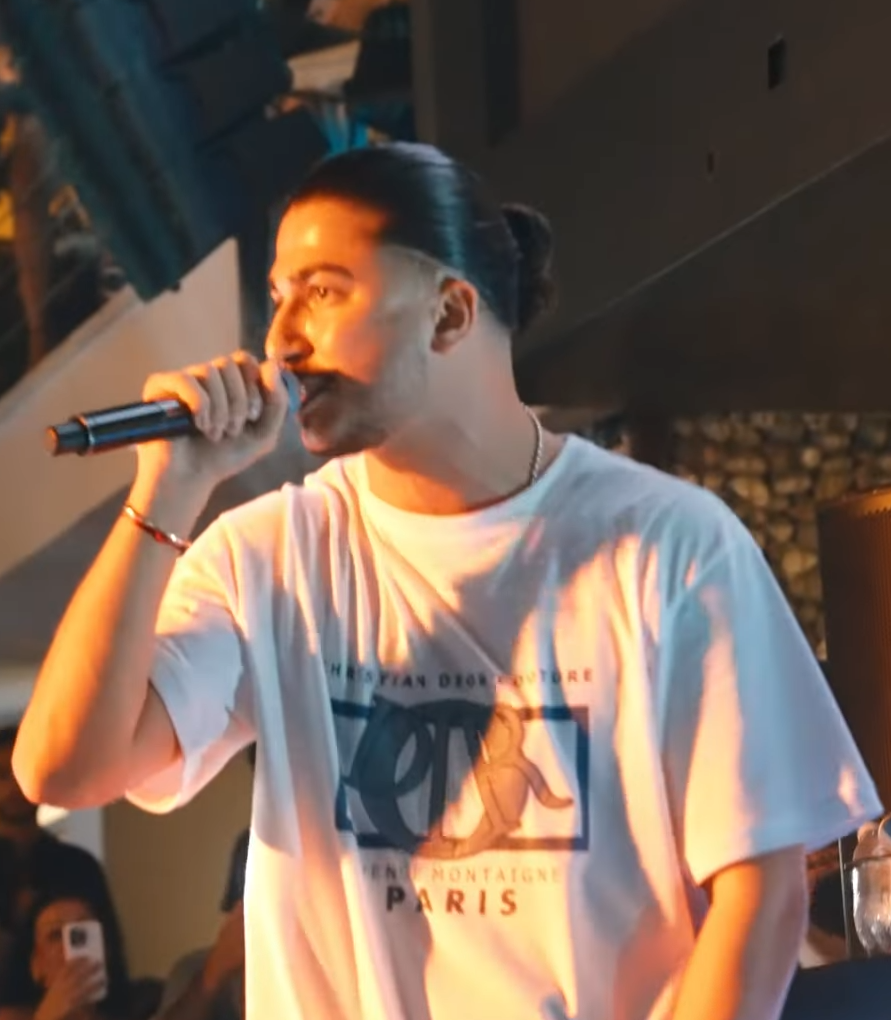
- Mero in 2024

Background information
- Born: 28 July 2000 (age 25); Rüsselsheim am Main, Germany
- Genres: Hip-hop
- Occupation: Rapper
- Years active: 2018–present
- Label: Groove Attack TraX

Enes Meral (born 28 July 2000), known professionally as Mero, is a Turkish-German rapper. He rose to prominence in 2018 with the release of his debut single "Baller los", which debuted at the top of the German and Austrian single charts. His follow-up singles "Hobby Hobby" and "Wolke 10" also topped the German and Austrian charts. In 2019, he was featured in the hits "Ferrari" by Eno and in "Kein Plan" by Loredana both topping the German chart. Mero has released three albums: Ya Hero Ya Mero and Unikat in 2019 and Seele in 2020.

== Life and career ==
Enes Meral was born and raised in Rüsselsheim am Main, Germany from Turkish parents. His family comes from the Kelkit district of Gümüşhane province in the Black Sea region of Turkey. He started posting videos filmed on a mobile phone where he is rapping on Instagram in 2016. He built a large following and was later signed by rapper Xatar and Groove Attack. His debut single "Baller los" was released on 22 November 2018. The single became an immediate success and reached the top of the German and Austrian single chart. His second single "Hobby Hobby" was released on 17 January 2019 and became the first German rap track to reach the Spotify 200. It again reached the top of the German single charts in end of January 2019. It broke the records for most streams in one day and one week. He released his first album Ya Hero Ya Mero on 15 March 2019 which has 12 tracks and his second album Unikat on 27 September 2019 which has 14 tracks.

== Discography ==
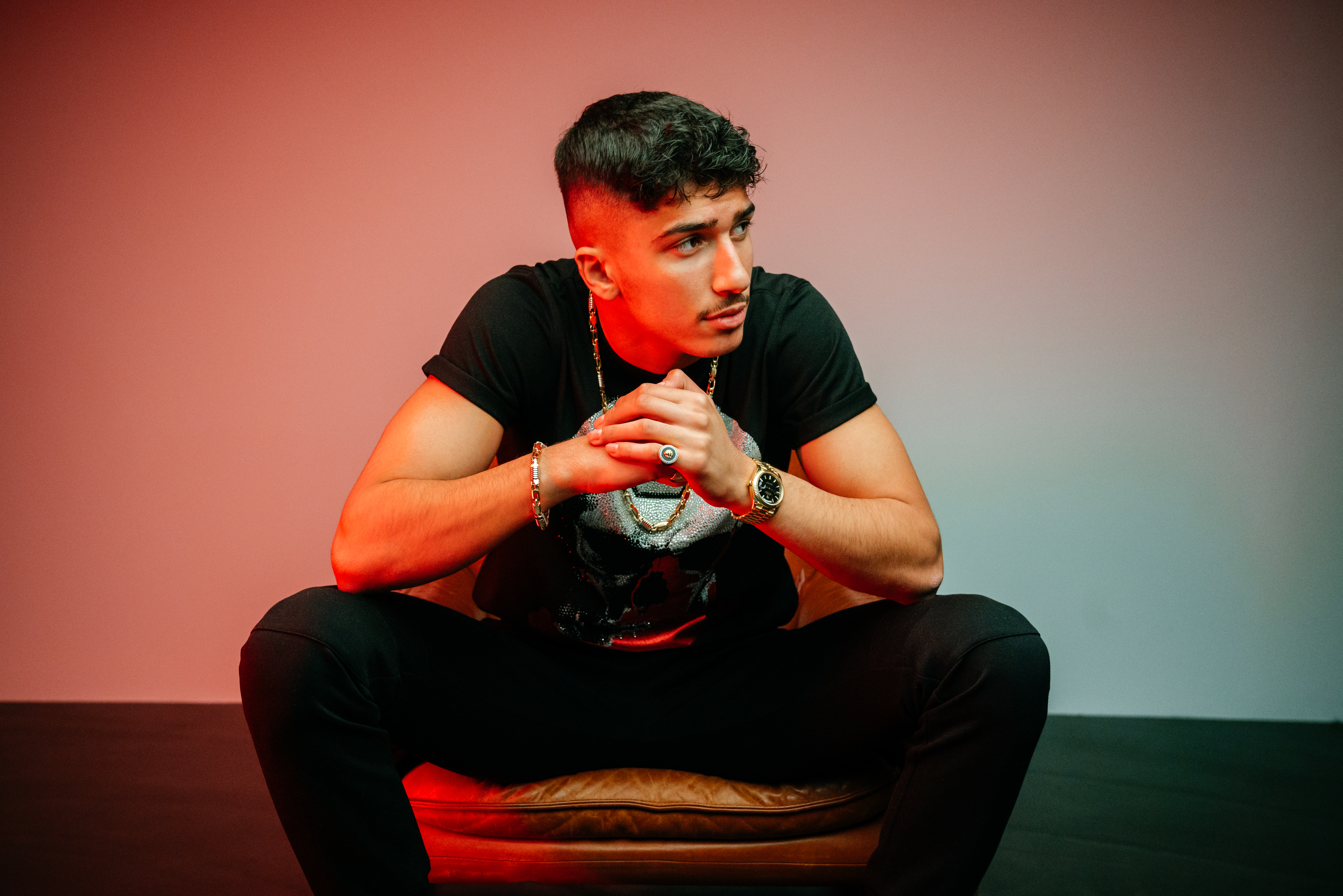
Mero in 2019

=== Studio albums ===
Title	Album details	Peak chart positions						
Title	Album details	GER	GER HH	AUT	BEL (FL)	BEL (WA)	NLD	SWI
Ya Hero Ya Mero	Released: 15 March 2019; Label: Groove Attack TraX; Formats: CD, digital download	1	1	1	173	168	60	1
Unikat	Released: 27 September 2019; Label: Groove Attack TraX; Formats: CD, digital download	4	2	6	198	—	71	14
Seele	Released: 4 December 2020; Label: Groove Attack TraX; Formats: CD, digital download	14	—	29	—	—	—	24
Renaissance	Released: 10 October 2024; Label: Pentagon, Urban; Formats: CD, digital download	7	—	50	—	—	—	28

=== Singles ===
==== As lead artist ====
Title	Year	Peak chart positions			Certifications	Album
Title	Year	GER	AUT	SWI	Certifications	Album
"Baller los"	2018	1	1	3	BVMI: Platinum; IFPI AUT: Platinum; IFPI SWI: Gold	Ya Hero Ya Mero
"Hobby Hobby"	2019	1	1	2	BVMI: Gold; IFPI AUT: Gold	Ya Hero Ya Mero
"Wolke 10"	2019	1	1	2	BVMI: Platinum; IFPI AUT: Platinum	Ya Hero Ya Mero
"Malediven"	2019	7	9	13		Unikat
"Olabilir"	2019	6	8	14		Unikat
"Mein Kopf"	2019	11	17	28		Unikat
"Olé Olé" (featuring Brado)	2019	13	25	32		Unikat
"No Name"	2019	17	33	42		Unikat
"Meine Hand"	2019	18	36	50		Unikat
"Bogota"	2020	13	17	29		Seele
"Ohne dich"	2020	21	36	44		Seele
"Perspektive"	2020	17	36	36		Seele
"Désolé" (featuring Nimo)	2020	3	10	13		Seele
"Ben elimi sana verdim"	2020	13	23	58		Seele
"Double Cup"	2021	43	—	56		Non-album singles
"3AM"	2022	25	62	69		Non-album singles
"Rapstars" (featuring Jamule)	2022	10	31	39		Non-album singles
"Konum Gizli" (featuring Murda)	2022	25	61	74		Non-album singles
"Du & ich"	2022	49	—	—		Non-album singles
"Favorites" (featuring Marlo)	2023	27	53	46		Non-album singles
"Leben lang"	2024	39	68	53		Non-album singles

==== As featured artist ====
Title	Year	Peak chart positions			Certifications	Album
Title	Year	GER	AUT	SWI	Certifications	Album
"Ferrari" (Eno featuring Mero)	2019	1	1	1	BVMI: Gold	Fuchs
"Kein Plan" (Loredana featuring Mero)	2019	1	2	4	BVMI: Gold; IFPI AUT: Gold	King Lori
"Kafa Leyla" (Brado featuring Mero)	2019	9	12	19		DB1
"Regen" (Ali471 featuring Mero)	2021	33	60	85		Ali
"Gece Gündüz" (Murda featuring Mero)	2021	36	48	79		non-album singles
"Sie weiß" (Aylivafeaturing Mero)	2023	1	1	3	BVMI: Gold	non-album singles
"Karma" (Samra featuring Mero)	2023	12	18	16		non-album singles

=== Other charted songs ===
List of other charted songs, with chart positions
Title	Year	Peak chart positions			Album
Title	Year	GER	AUT	SWI	Album
"Jay Jay"	2019	5	6	11	Ya Hero Ya Mero
"Träume werden wahr" (featuring Brado)	2019	7	—	—	Ya Hero Ya Mero
"Wie Buffon"	2019	9	8	19	Ya Hero Ya Mero
"Hops"	2019	12	—	—	Ya Hero Ya Mero
"Gib ihn"	2019	18	—	—	Ya Hero Ya Mero
"Mill'n"	2019	19	—	—	Ya Hero Ya Mero
"Auf dem Weg"	2019	22	—	—	Ya Hero Ya Mero
"Enes Meral"	2019	26	—	—	Ya Hero Ya Mero
"Intro"	2019	36	—	—	Ya Hero Ya Mero
"QDH Family"	2019	45	59	99	Unikat
"Hayati" (Soolking featuring Mero)	2020	10	31	23	Vintage
"Bitte geh" (feat. Elif)	2020	14	33	37	Seele

== Music videos ==
List of music videos
Title	Year	Director(s)	Ref.
As lead artist
"Baller los"	2018	MG	
"Hobby Hobby"	2019	PLUG	
"Wolke 10"	2019	Jakub and Tatjana	
"Olabilir"	2019	Leeroy	
"Mein Kopf"	2019	Arif Baynaz	
"Olé Olé" Mero feat. Brado	2019	Leeroy	
"No Name"	2019	Junior Ratchel	
"Meine Hand"	2019	Daniel Zlotin	
"Bogota"	2020	PLUG	
"Ohne Dich"	2020	Kevin Jerome, Noosh Latifi	
"Perspektive"	2020	Leeroy	
"Désolé" featuring Nimo	2020	Henning Brix (IMUN)	
"Ben Elimi Sana Verdim"	2020	Max Elyx	
"Double Cup"	2021	1Take Films	
As featured artist
"Ferrari" Eno feat. Mero	2019	Michael Jackson	
"Kein Plan" Loredana feat. Mero	2019	Fati.TV	

== Awards and nominations ==
Year	Awards	Category	Work	Result	Ref.
2019	Bravo Otto Awards	Hip-Hop national	Himself	Nominated	
2019	HipHop.de Awards	Best Newcomer	Himself	Nominated	
2019	HipHop.de Awards	Best Song National	Ferrari (with Eno)	Nominated	
2019	HipHop.de Awards	Rap-Solo-Act National	Himself	Nominated	
2019	Hype Awards	Best Male Artist	Himself	Won	
2019	Hype Awards	Newcomer	Himself	Nominated	
2019	Pantene Golden Butterfly Awards	Best Newcomer Artist	Himself	Nominated	
2019	Pantene Golden Butterfly Awards	Song of the Year	Olabilir	Nominated	
2021	Music Moves Europe Talent Awards	German-Act	Himself	Nominated	
