= Ya Hero Ya Mero =

Studio album by Mero
- Released: 15 March 2019
- Length: 32:30
- Language: German
- Label: Groove Attack TraX
- Producer: E.M Beats; Josh Petruccio; Doki; Jizar; IVN; Lia; CXDY; Oster

Mero chronology
Ya Hero Ya Mero (2019)	Unikat (2019)

Singles from Ya Hero Ya Mero
- 1. "Baller los" Released: 23 November 2018; 2. "Hobby Hobby" Released: 18 January 2019; 3. "Wolke 10" Released: 7 March 2019

Ya Hero Ya Mero is the debut studio album by German rapper Mero. The album was released on 15 March 2019, through Groove Attack TraX.

The album produced three singles, "Baller los", "Hobby Hobby" and "Wolke 10", all of which reached number one in Germany and Austria. Every single was supported by a music video. The album debuted at number one in Germany and entered the album charts in Belgium and the Netherlands.

== Background ==
In 2017, Mero started gaining popularity by posting rap tracks on his social media, especially on Instagram. To date, his account attained over one million followers. In May 2018, he was signed to the label Groove Attack TraX by rapper Xatar. His debut single "Baller los" was released in November 2018 and instantly reached number one in Germany and Austria. Ya Hero Ya Mero was announced alongside the single release. Over the course of the next four months, he released two more singles, "Hobby Hobby" and "Wolke 10", both of which reached number one in Germany and Austria. On 21 February, Mero released a teaser promoting the album. Upon release, all of the album tracks entered the German single charts with three of them ("Jay Jay", "Träume werden wahr" and "Wie Buffon") reaching the Top 10.

== Track listing ==
Credits adapted from Tidal.

No.	Title	Writer(s)	Producer(s)	Length
1.	"Intro"	Enes Meral	E.M Beats	1:44
2.	"Baller los"	Meral	Josh Petruccio	2:41
3.	"Hops"	Meral	Doki	2:34
4.	"Mill'n"	Meral	E.M Beats	2:32
5.	"Hobby Hobby"	Meral	Petruccio	2:34
6.	"Auf dem Weg"	Meral	Jizar	3:54
7.	"Jay Jay"	Meral	IVN	2:18
8.	"Wie Buffon"	Meral	Lia	2:37
9.	"Gib ihn"	Meral	CXDY	3:22
10.	"Wolke 10"	Meral	E.M Beats	2:53
11.	"Träume werden wahr" (featuring Brrado)	Meral	E.M Beats	2:46
12.	"Enes Meral"	Meral	Oster	2:35
Total length:				32:30

== Charts ==
=== Weekly charts ===
Chart performance for Ya Hero Ya Mero
Chart (2019)	Peak position
Austrian Albums (Ö3 Austria)	1
Belgian Albums (Ultratop Flanders)	173
Belgian Albums (Ultratop Wallonia)	168
Dutch Albums (Album Top 100)	60
German Albums (Offizielle Top 100)	1
German Albums (Top 20 Hip Hop)	1
Swiss Albums (Schweizer Hitparade)	1

=== Year-end charts ===
2019 year-end chart performance for Ya Hero Ya Mero
Chart (2019)	Position
Austrian Albums (Ö3 Austria)	35
German Albums (Offizielle Top 100)	31
Swiss Albums (Schweizer Hitparade)	63

== Release history ==
Region	Date	Format(s)	Label	Ref.
Various	15 March 2019	Streaming; digital download	Groove Attack TraX	
Various	15 March 2019	CD; Box set	Groove Attack TraX	
