= Flo Rida discography =

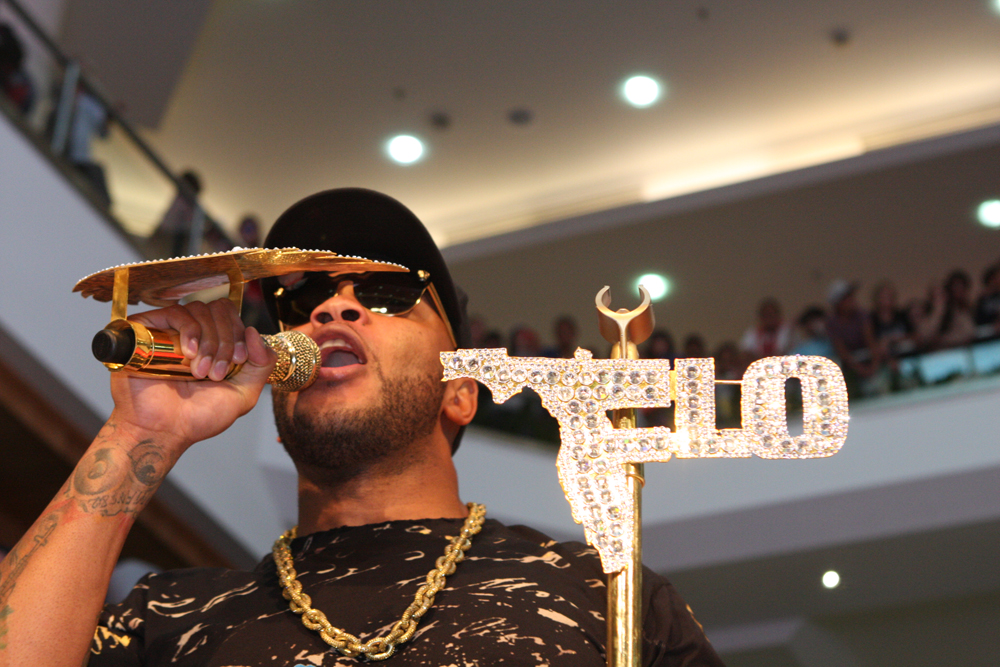
- Flo Rida performing in 2012
- Studio albums: 5
- Extended plays: 4
- Compilation albums: 1
- Singles: 44
- Promotional singles: 12
- Music videos: 24

American rapper Flo Rida has released four studio albums, one compilation album, four extended plays, 45 singles as a lead artist (32 of which comprise featured appearances), twelve promotional singles, and 24 music videos. Growing up in Florida, the state from which his name was derived, he was involved in a hip hop group in his teenage years. He began releasing mixtapes before signing Poe Boy Entertainment,in 2006.

His debut single "Low" featuring T-Pain was released in 2007 and reached number one in many countries, including Australia, Canada, Ireland, New Zealand and the United States. "Low" was featured on the track listing of the soundtrack to Step Up 2: The Streets, and stayed atop the Billboard Hot 100 for ten weeks, going on to be certified diamond by the Recording Industry Association of America (RIAA). The song was included on his debut album Mail on Sunday which peaked at number four on the Billboard 200 following its release in 2008. Following singles "Elevator" featuring Timbaland, and "In the Ayer" featuring will.i.am both peaked within the top twenty in the five aforementioned countries. In the same year, a collaboration with Jessica Mauboy on "Running Back" reached number three in Australia, and was certified double platinum there.

In 2009, Flo Rida released his second studio album R.O.O.T.S.; its lead single "Right Round" topped the national charts of Canada, Germany, Ireland, and the United Kingdom, in addition to the American one, where it remained for six consecutive weeks. The single, which features Kesha, was eventually certified 4× platinum in the US, and triple platinum in Australia, and Canada. Four additional singles were released from the album: "Shone", "Sugar" featuring Wynter, "Jump" featuring Nelly Furtado, and "Be on You" featuring Ne-Yo; "Sugar" and "Be on You" peaked in the top twenty of the Billboard Hot 100. R.O.O.T.S. peaked at number 8 in the US and number 5 in the UK. In 2009, Flo Rida also appeared on The X Factor winner Alexandra Burke's "Bad Boys", a number-one single in both Ireland, and the UK. The following year, a featured appearance on The Saturdays' "Higher" managed to reach number 10 in the UK.

Flo Rida's next two studio albums were announced in 2010 as a two-part oeuvre. Only One Flo (Part 1), which was released in November 2010 to showcase melodic talent, contains the David Guetta-assisted "Club Can't Handle Me", a number one single in Ireland, and the UK. The album's second single "Turn Around (5, 4, 3, 2, 1)" has reached the top 40 in Australia, and New Zealand, and third single "Who Dat Girl" featuring Akon has charted in several countries, including the top 30 in the US and the top 10 in Australia. Follow-up album Wild Ones (originally titled Only One Rida (Part 2)) was released in July 2012. It is Flo Rida's most successful studio album, with a string of global top 5 hits, including "Good Feeling", "Wild Ones", "Whistle" and "I Cry".

In 2015, Flo Rida's 2014 single "G.D.F.R." peaked at number 8 on the Billboard Hot 100 and was later certified triple platinum by the RIAA. In 2016, Flo Rida's 2015 single "My House" peaked at number 4 on the Hot 100 making it his eleventh top 10 single.

== Albums ==
=== Studio albums ===
List of studio albums, with selected chart positions, sales figures and certifications
Title	Album details	Peak chart positions										Sales	Certifications
Title	Album details	US	AUS	AUT	CAN	FRA	GER	IRL	NZ	SWI	UK	Sales	Certifications
Mail on Sunday	Released: March 18, 2008 (US); Label: Poe Boy, Atlantic; Formats: CD, digital download	4	21	—	4	129	50	57	14	60	29	US: 450,000	ARIA: Gold; BPI: Gold; MC: Gold
R.O.O.T.S.	Released: March 31, 2009 (US); Label: Poe Boy, Atlantic; Formats: CD, digital download	8	6	21	6	25	21	13	13	14	5	US: 300,000	RIAA: Platinum; BPI: Gold; MC: Gold; RMNZ: 2× Platinum
Only One Flo (Part 1)	Released: November 30, 2010 (US); Label: Poe Boy, Atlantic; Formats: CD, digital download	107	82	—	70	—	—	—	—	—	179	US: 100,000	RMNZ: Gold
Wild Ones	Released: July 3, 2012 (US); Label: Poe Boy, Atlantic; Formats: CD, digital download	14	5	8	1	19	16	9	6	7	8	US: 320,000	ARIA: Gold; BPI: Gold; MC: Gold; RMNZ: 3× Platinum
"—" denotes a recording that did not chart or was not released in that territory.

=== Compilation albums ===
List of compilation albums, with selected chart positions
Title	Album details	Peak chart positions
Title	Album details	AUS
Now Playing	Released: November 15, 2024; Label: Rhino; Formats: LP	52

== Extended plays ==
List of extended plays, with selected chart positions and certifications
Title	Album details	Peak chart positions					Certifications
Title	Album details	US	AUS	CAN	NZ	UK	Certifications
iTunes Live: London Festival '09	Released: July 15, 2009 (US); Label: Atlantic; Formats: Digital download	—	—	—	—	—	
Hits Mix	Released: December 1, 2009 (US); Label: Atlantic; Formats: Digital download	—	—	—	—	—	
Good Feeling	Released: April 6, 2012 (AUS); Label: Sony; Formats: CD, digital download	—	12	—	5	—	
My House	Released: April 7, 2015; Label: Poe Boy, Atlantic; Formats: CD, Digital download	14	—	9	—	114	BPI: Silver; RMNZ: Platinum
"—" denotes a recording that did not chart or was not released in that territory.

== Singles ==
=== As lead artist ===
List of singles as lead artist, with selected chart positions and certifications, showing year released and album name
Title	Year	Peak chart positions										Certifications	Album
Title	Year	US	AUS	AUT	CAN	GER	IRL	NZ	SWE	SWI	UK	Certifications	Album
"Low" (featuring T-Pain)	2007	1	1	9	1	13	1	1	17	13	2	RIAA: Diamond; ARIA: 3× Platinum; BPI: 4× Platinum; BVMI: 5× Gold; IFPI SWI: Platinum; MC: 3× Platinum; RMNZ: 6× Platinum	Mail on Sunday
"Elevator" (featuring Timbaland)	2008	16	13	69	10	34	11	10	19	92	20	RIAA: Platinum; ARIA: Gold; MC: Gold	Mail on Sunday
"In the Ayer" (featuring will.i.am)	2008	9	19	—	13	50	13	9	20	—	29	RIAA: 2× Platinum; MC: Platinum	Mail on Sunday
"Right Round" (featuring Kesha)	2009	1	1	2	1	4	1	2	2	2	1	RIAA: 8× Platinum; ARIA: 3× Platinum; BPI: 2× Platinum; BVMI: Platinum; IFPI AUT: Gold; IFPI SWI: Platinum; MC: 4× Platinum; RMNZ: 3× Platinum	R.O.O.T.S.
"Shone" (featuring Pleasure P)	2009	57	—	—	38	—	—	—	—	—	144		R.O.O.T.S.
"Sugar" (featuring Wynter Gordon)	2009	5	20	28	8	37	14	26	31	40	18	RIAA: Platinum; RIAJ: Gold; BPI: Silver; MC: Gold	R.O.O.T.S.
"Jump" (featuring Nelly Furtado)	2009	54	18	34	32	27	26	33	—	—	21	RIAA: Gold	R.O.O.T.S.
"Be on You" (featuring Ne-Yo)	2009	19	—	—	61	—	—	—	—	—	51	RIAA: Gold	R.O.O.T.S.
"Available" (featuring Akon)	2009	—	—	—	89	—	—	—	—	—	—		R.O.O.T.S.
"Club Can't Handle Me" (featuring David Guetta)	2010	9	3	3	4	4	1	3	11	3	1	RIAA: 3× Platinum; ARIA: 3× Platinum; BPI: 2× Platinum; BVMI: 3× Gold; IFPI SWI: Platinum; MC: 3× Platinum; RMNZ: 3× Platinum	Only One Flo (Part 1)
"Turn Around (5, 4, 3, 2, 1)"	2010	98	12	7	46	8	36	33	54	21	41	ARIA: 2× Platinum; BVMI: Gold	Only One Flo (Part 1)
"Who Dat Girl" (featuring Akon)	2011	29	10	45	16	—	—	—	—	—	64	ARIA: Platinum; MC: Platinum	Only One Flo (Part 1)
"Good Feeling"	2011	3	4	1	2	1	1	5	4	3	1	RIAA: 5× Platinum; ARIA: 5× Platinum; BPI: 2× Platinum; BVMI: Platinum; IFPI AUT: Platinum; IFPI SWE: 4× Platinum; IFPI SWI: 2× Platinum; MC: 5× Platinum; RMNZ: 4× Platinum	Wild Ones
"Wild Ones" (featuring Sia)	2011	5	1	2	1	6	3	1	3	3	4	RIAA: 5× Platinum; ARIA: 7× Platinum; BPI: 2× Platinum; BVMI: Gold; IFPI AUT: Platinum; IFPI SWE: 5× Platinum; IFPI SWI: Platinum; MC: 5× Platinum; RMNZ: 5× Platinum	Wild Ones
"Whistle"	2012	1	1	2	1	2	1	1	1	1	2	RIAA: 5× Platinum; ARIA: 7× Platinum; BPI: 2× Platinum; BVMI: 3× Gold; IFPI AUT: Platinum; IFPI SWE: 5× Platinum; IFPI SWI: Platinum; MC: 5× Platinum; RMNZ: 4× Platinum	Wild Ones
"I Cry"	2012	6	3	6	9	10	12	4	17	9	3	RIAA: 2× Platinum; ARIA: 3× Platinum; BPI: Platinum; BVMI: Gold; IFPI SWI: Platinum; MC: 2× Platinum; RMNZ: Platinum	Wild Ones
"Let It Roll"	2013	—	7	6	23	24	34	18	—	—	17	IFPI AUT: Gold; RMNZ: Gold	Wild Ones
"Can't Believe It" (featuring Pitbull)	2013	— (Note: "Can't Believe It" did not enter the Billboard Hot 100, but peaked at number 2 on the Bubbling Under Hot 100 Singles chart, which acts as an extension to the Hot 100.)	7	16	26	4	19	36	—	19	—	ARIA: Gold	Non-album singles
"How I Feel"	2013	96	20	6	57	24	31	—	—	24	8	ARIA: Gold	Non-album singles
"G.D.F.R." (featuring Sage the Gemini and Lookas)	2014	8	36	12	10	7	15	21	12	23	3	RIAA: 4× Platinum; ARIA: Gold; BPI: Platinum; BVMI: Platinum; MC: Platinum; RMNZ: 2× Platinum	My House
"I Don't Like It, I Love It" (featuring Robin Thicke and Verdine White)	2015	43	17	7	30	19	8	8	33	25	7	RIAA: Platinum; ARIA: Platinum; BPI: Platinum; BVMI: Gold; RMNZ: 2× Platinum	My House
"My House"	2015	4	6	8	5	16	40	12	4	15	59	RIAA: 6× Platinum; ARIA: 2× Platinum; BPI: Platinum; BVMI: Platinum; GLF: Platinum; RMNZ: 5× Platinum	My House
"Hello Friday" (featuring Jason Derulo)	2016	79	36	—	—	—	—	—	— (Note: "Hello Friday" did not enter the Swedish Singles Chart, but peaked at number three on the Swedish Heatseeker chart.)	—	198		Non-album singles
"Cake" (featuring 99 Percent)	2016	73	—	—	—	—	—	—	—	—	—	RIAA: Gold; RMNZ: Gold	Non-album singles
"Zillionaire"	2016	—	—	—	—	—	—	—	— (Note: "Zillionaire" did not enter the Swedish Singles Chart, but peaked at number 16 on the Swedish Heatseeker chart.)	—	174		Non-album singles
"Hola" (featuring Maluma)	2017	—	81	—	—	—	—	—	—	60	—		Non-album singles
"Dancer"	2018	—	—	—	—	—	—	—	— (Note: "Dancer" did not enter the Swedish Singellista Chart, but peaked at number 13 on the Swedish Heatseeker Chart.)	72	—		Non-album singles
"Sweet Sensation"	2018	—	—	—	—	—	—	—	—	—	—		Non-album singles
"In My Mind, Part 3" (featuring Georgi Kay)	2018	—	—	—	—	—	—	—	—	—	—		Non-album singles
"Snack" (featuring E-40 and Sage the Gemini)	2019	—	—	—	—	—	—	—	—	—	—		Non-album singles
"Summer's Not Ready" (featuring Inna and Timmy Trumpet)	2021	—	—	—	—	—	—	—	— (Note: "Summer's Not Ready" did not enter the Swedish Singellista Chart, but peaked at number 10 on the Swedish Heatseeker Chart.)	—	—		Non-album singles
"Wait"	2021	—	—	—	—	—	—	— (Note: "Wait" did not enter the NZ Top 40 Singles Chart, but peaked at number 10 on the NZ Hot Singles Chart.)	—	—	—		Non-album singles
"What a Night"	2022	—	—	—	—	—	—	—	—	—	—		Non-album singles
"No Bad Days"	2022	—	—	—	—	—	—	—	—	—	—		Non-album singles
"High Heels" (featuring Walker Hayes)	2022	—	—	—	—	—	—	—	—	—	—		Non-album singles
"Good Girls on Vacation"	2023	—	—	—	—	—	—	—	—	—	—		Non-album singles
"Feels Right (I Love It)" (featuring Brian Kelley)	2024	—	—	—	—	—	—	—	—	—	—		Non-album singles
"When I Grow Up (Young, Wild & Free)" (featuring Alan Walker)	2024	—	—	—	—	—	—	—	—	—	—		Non-album singles
"Confessions" (featuring Paul Russell and Enhypen's Heeseung and Jake)	2025	—	—	—	—	—	—	—	—	—	—		Non-album singles
"—" denotes a recording that did not chart or was not released in that territory.

=== As featured artist ===
List of singles as featured artist, with selected chart positions and certifications, showing year released and album name
Title	Year	Peak chart positions										Certifications	Album
Title	Year	US	AUS	AUT	CAN	FRA	GER	IRL	NZ	SWI	UK	Certifications	Album
"Bitch I'm From Dade County" (DJ Khaled featuring Flo Rida, Trick Daddy, Trina, Rick Ross, Brisco, C-Ride, and Dr. Dre)	2007	67	—	—	—	—	—	—	—	—	—		We the Best
"Move Shake Drop" (DJ Laz featuring Flo Rida, Casely, and Pitbull)	2008	56	—	—	—	—	—	—	—	—	—		Category 6
"We Break the Dawn (Part 2)" (Michelle Williams featuring Flo Rida)	2008	—	—	—	—	—	—	—	—	—	—		Unexpected
"Running Back" (Jessica Mauboy featuring Flo Rida)	2008	—	3	—	—	—	—	—	—	—	—	ARIA: 2× Platinum	Been Waiting
"Just Know Dat" (Brisco featuring Lil Wayne and Flo Rida)	2008	—	—	—	—	—	—	—	—	—	—		Street Medicine
"Feel It" (DJ Felli Fel featuring T-Pain, Sean Paul, Flo Rida, and Pitbull)	2009	—	—	—	—	—	—	—	—	—	—		Non-album singles
"Sunshine" (Phyllisia featuring Ne-Yo and Flo Rida)	2009	—	—	—	—	—	—	—	—	—	—		Non-album singles
"Good Girls Like Bad Boys" (Jadyn Maria featuring Flo Rida)	2009	—	—	—	—	—	—	—	—	—	—		Non-album singles
"Cause a Scene" (Teairra Marí featuring Flo Rida)	2009	—	—	—	—	—	—	—	—	—	—		Non-album singles
"Ruff Me Up" (Brooke Hogan featuring Flo Rida)	2009	—	—	—	—	—	—	—	—	—	—		The Redemption
"Come Alive" (Masha K featuring Flo Rida)	2009	—	—	—	—	—	—	—	—	—	—		Non-album single
"Bad Boys" (Alexandra Burke featuring Flo Rida)	2009	—	—	22	—	—	14	1	—	12	1	BPI: Platinum	Overcome
"Drop That" (Mista Mac featuring Flo Rida, Brisco, and Ball Greezy)	2009	—	—	—	—	—	—	—	—	—	—		Live from the 305
"Feelin' on My A" (Dear Jayne featuring Flo Rida)	2009	—	—	—	—	—	—	—	—	—	—		Non-album single
"Kick It Out" (Boom Boom Satellites featuring Tahj Mowry and Flo Rida)	2009	—	—	—	—	—	—	—	—	—	—		Remixed
"Candy Girl (Sugar Sugar)" (Inner Circle featuring Flo Rida)	2009	—	—	—	—	—	—	—	—	—	—		State of da World
"Dance with Me" (Aaron Carter featuring Flo Rida)	2009	—	—	—	—	—	—	—	—	—	—		Non-album singles
"What Girls Like" (Smokey featuring Flo Rida and Git Fresh)	2010	—	—	—	—	—	—	—	—	—	—		Non-album singles
"Drop" (Ultimate featuring Flo Rida and Git Fresh)	2010	—	—	—	—	—	—	—	—	—	—		Non-album singles
"Dancin' for Me" (J. Lewis featuring Flo Rida)	2010	—	—	—	—	—	—	—	—	—	—		Non-album singles
"Caught Me Slippin" (Starboy Nathan featuring Flo Rida)	2010	—	—	—	—	—	—	—	—	—	—		3D – Determination, Dedication, Desire
"iYiYi" (Cody Simpson featuring Flo Rida)	2010	— (Note: "iYiYi" did not enter the Billboard Hot 100, but peaked at number 12 on the Bubbling Under Hot 100 Singles chart, which acts as an extension to the Hot 100.)	19	—	73	—	—	—	29	—	—	ARIA: Gold; MC: Gold	4 U
"Let Me Show U" (Wesley featuring Flo Rida)	2010	—	—	—	—	—	—	—	—	—	—		Non-album single
"You Make the Rain Fall" (Kevin Rudolf featuring Flo Rida)	2010	—	—	—	59	—	—	—	—	—	—		To the Sky
"Higher" (The Saturdays featuring Flo Rida)	2010	—	—	—	—	—	—	11	—	—	10	BPI: Platinum	Headlines!
"SMH (Shakin' My Head)" (Detail featuring Flo Rida)	2010	—	—	—	—	—	—	—	—	—	—		Non-album singles
"Dance with Me" (Justice Crew featuring Flo Rida)	2011	—	44	—	—	—	—	—	—	—	—	ARIA: Gold	Non-album singles
"Anywhere" (Kevin Lyttle featuring Flo Rida)	2011	—	—	—	—	—	—	—	—	—	—		Non-album singles
"Where Them Girls At" (David Guetta featuring Flo Rida and Nicki Minaj)	2011	14	6	3	3	4	5	5	6	3	3	RIAA: Platinum; ARIA: 2× Platinum; BPI: 2× Platinum; BVMI: 3× Gold; IFPI AUT: Gold; IFPI SWI: Platinum; RMNZ: 2× Platinum	Nothing but the Beat
"I'm Alright" (Jean-Roch featuring Flo Rida and Kat DeLuna)	2011	—	—	—	—	33	—	—	—	—	—		Music Saved My Life
"Club Rocker" (Inna featuring Flo Rida)	2011	—	—	14	—	32	55	—	—	64	—		I Am the Club Rocker
"Hangover" (Taio Cruz featuring Flo Rida)	2011	62	3	1	13	8	2	22	10	1	27	ARIA: 4× Platinum; BVMI: 2× Platinum; RMNZ: Gold; IFPI AUT: 2× Platinum; IFPI SWI: 3× Platinum; BPI: Silver	TY.O
"Take Over" (Mizz Nina featuring Flo Rida)	2011	—	—	—	—	—	—	—	—	—	—		Take Over
"Baby It's the Last Time" (R.J. featuring Flo Rida and Qwote)	2012	—	—	59	—	—	93	—	—	—	—		Non-album singles
"I'm Tired" (Phyllisia featuring Flo Rida)	2012	—	—	—	—	—	—	—	—	—	—		Non-album singles
"Quiero Creer" (Beto Cuevas featuring Flo Rida)	2012	—	—	—	—	—	—	—	—	—	—		Transformación
"Goin' In" (Jennifer Lopez featuring Flo Rida)	2012	—	—	58	54	—	67	—	—	—	—		Dance Again... the Hits
"Get Low" (Waka Flocka Flame featuring Nicki Minaj, Tyga, and Flo Rida)	2012	72	—	—	58	—	—	—	—	—	—		Triple F Life: Fans, Friends & Family
"Troublemaker" (Olly Murs featuring Flo Rida)	2012	25	4	3	15	9	2	3	5	8	1	RIAA: Platinum; ARIA: 3× Platinum; BPI: 3× Platinum; BVMI: Gold; IFPI AUT: Gold; IFPI SWI: Gold; MC: 2× Platinum; RMNZ: Platinum	Right Place Right Time
"Change Your Life" (Far East Movement featuring Flo Rida and Sidney Samson)	2012	—	60	—	91	—	—	—	—	—	—		Dirty Bass
"Say You're Just a Friend" (Austin Mahone featuring Flo Rida)	2012	— (Note: "Say You're Just a Friend" did not enter the Billboard Hot 100, but peaked at number four on the Bubbling Under Hot 100 Singles chart, which acts as an extension to the Hot 100.)	—	—	—	—	—	—	—	—	—	RIAA: Gold	Extended Play
"Sing La La La" (Carolina Márquez featuring Flo Rida and Dale Saunders)	2013	—	—	44	—	60	82	—	—	70	—		Non-album single
"Danse" (Tal featuring Flo Rida)	2013	—	—	—	—	33	—	—	—	—	—		À l'Infini
"Ride" (J Rand featuring Flo Rida and T-Pain)	2013	—	—	—	—	—	—	—	—	—	—		Non-album singles
"I Don't Mind" (Timati featuring Flo Rida)	2013	—	—	—	—	—	—	—	—	—	—		Non-album singles
"One Night Stand" (TWiiNS featuring Flo Rida)	2013	—	—	—	—	—	—	—	—	—	—		Non-album singles
"There Goes My Baby" (Enrique Iglesias featuring Flo Rida)	2014	—	—	—	—	—	—	26	—	—	50		Sex and Love
"Tonight Belongs to U!" (Jeremih featuring Flo Rida)	2015	—	—	—	—	73	—	—	—	—	80		Non-album singles
"At Night" (Liz Elias featuring Flo Rida)	2016	—	—	—	—	—	—	—	—	—	—		Non-album singles
"Greenlight" (Pitbull featuring Flo Rida and LunchMoney Lewis)	2016	95	—	—	—	—	90	17	—	—	—	RIAA: Platinum	Climate Change
"Champagne on Me" (Lotus featuring Arlissa and Flo Rida)	2017	—	—	—	—	—	—	—	—	—	—		Non-album singles
"Right on Time" (Ray J featuring Flo Rida, Brandy, and Designer Doubt)	2018	—	—	—	—	—	—	—	—	—	—		Non-album singles
"Adrenalina" (Senhit featuring Flo Rida)	2021	—	—	—	—	—	—	—	—	—	99		Non-album singles
"—" denotes a recording that did not chart or was not released in that territory.

=== Promotional singles ===
List of promotional singles, with selected chart positions, showing year released and album name
Title	Year	Peak chart positions							Album
Title	Year	US	US R&B	AUS	AUT	CAN	FRA	UK	Album
"Birthday" (Note: "Birthday" did not enter the Billboard Hot R&B/Hip-Hop Songs chart, but peaked at number seven on the Bubbling Under R&B/Hip-Hop Singles chart, which acts as an extension to the Hot R&B/Hip-Hop Songs chart.)	2007	—	107	—	—	—	—	—	Mail on Sunday
"Radio"	2007	—	—	—	—	—	—	—	Mail on Sunday
"Roll" (featuring Sean Kingston)	2008	61	—	—	—	43	—	—	Mail on Sunday
"Touch Me"	2009	—	—	—	—	—	—	—	R.O.O.T.S.
"Balla" (featuring Brisco and Billy Blue)	2009	—	—	—	—	—	—	—	R.O.O.T.S.
"Good Girls Go Bad" (Frank E Remix) (Cobra Starship featuring Flo Rida)	2009	—	—	—	—	—	—	—	Hot Mess
"Come with Me" (Note: "Come with Me" did not enter the Billboard Hot R&B/Hip-Hop Songs chart, but peaked at number 15 on the Bubbling Under R&B/Hip-Hop Singles chart, which acts as an extension to the Hot R&B/Hip-Hop Songs chart.)	2010	—	115	—	—	—	—	—	Only One Flo (Part 1)
"Turn Around, Pt. 2" (featuring Pitbull)	2011	—	—	—	—	—	—	—	The Hangover Part II soundtrack
"In the Dark" (Remix) (Dev featuring Flo Rida)	2011	—	—	—	—	—	—	—	The Night the Sun Came Up
"Tell Me When You Ready" (featuring Future)	2013	—	—	—	—	93	—	—	Non-album single
"Sweet Spot" (featuring Jennifer Lopez)	2013	—	—	25	39	—	195	—	Wild Ones
"Rear View" (featuring August Alsina)	2014	—	—	—	—	—	—	—	Non-album single
"That's What I Like" (featuring Fitz)	2015	—	—	—	—	—	—	—	My House
"Dirty Mind" (featuring Sam Martin)	2015	—	—	—	—	—	—	—	Non-album singles
"Who's with Me"	2016	—	—	—	—	—	—	—	Non-album singles
"Game Time" (featuring Sage the Gemini)	2017	—	—	—	—	—	—	—	Non-album singles
"—" denotes a recording that did not chart or was not released in that territory.

== Other charted songs ==
List of songs, with selected chart positions, showing year released and album name
Title	Year	Peak chart positions						Certifications	Album
Title	Year	US Bub.	AUS	CAN	GER	SWI	UK	Certifications	Album
"Starstruck" (Lady Gaga featuring Space Cowboy and Flo Rida)	2008	7	—	74	—	—	191	RIAA: Platinum; ARIA: Gold	The Fame
"Run" (featuring Redfoo)	2012	—	44	29	—	—	—		Wild Ones
"In My Mind (Part 2)" (featuring Georgi Kay)	2012	—	44	—	—	—	—		Wild Ones
"Let It Roll (Part 2)" (featuring Lil Wayne)	2012	—	77	—	—	—	—		Wild Ones
"Here It Is" (featuring Chris Brown)	2015	—	—	—	94	50	—		My House
"—" denotes a recording that did not chart or was not released in that territory.

== Guest appearances ==
List of non-single guest appearances, with other performing artists, showing year released and album name
Title	Year	Other performer(s)	Album
"Legs up"	2004	Fresh kid ice, Bred	Freaky chinese
"liquor talking"	2004	Fresh kid ice, Bred	Freaky chinese
"Let me see it"	2004	Fresh kid ice, Bred	Freaky chinese
"Bitch I'm from Dade County"	2007	DJ Khaled, Trick Daddy, Trina, Rick Ross, Brisco, C-Ride, Dre	We the Best
"Speedin'" (We The Best Remix)	2007	Rick Ross, R. Kelly, DJ Khaled, Plies, Birdman, Busta Rhymes, DJ Drama, Webbie, Gorilla Zoe, Fat Joe, Torch, Gunplay, DJ Bigga Rankin', Brisco, Lil Wayne	none
"Street Money"	2008	Rick Ross	Trilla
"Liar Liar"	2008	Girlicious	Girlicious
"Starstruck"	2008	Lady Gaga, Space Cowboy	The Fame
"Go Ahead"	2008	DJ Khaled, Fabolous, Lloyd, Rick Ross, Fat Joe	We Global
"Love for Money"	2009	DJ Drama, Trey Songz, Willie the Kid, Gucci Mane, La the Darkman, Yung Joc, Bun B	Gangsta Grillz: The Album (Vol. 2)
"Baby Makin' Nigga"	2009	Mike Epps	Funny Bidness: Da Album
"Written on Her" (Remix)	2009	Birdman, Jay Sean, Mack Maine	Priceless
"Intro" / "Sweet Dreams"	2009	Brianna Perry	The Graduation
"Rewind"		Brianna Perry	The Graduation
"I Know You Got a Man"	2010	Ludacris	Battle of the Sexes
"Heartbreaker"	2010	G-Dragon	Shine a Light
"Go Crazy"	2010	Pitbull, Lil Jon, Krave	Mr. Worldwide
"White Girl"	2010	Trina, Git Fresh	Amazin'
"Replay" (Remix)	2010	Iyaz	Replay
"We Found Love" (Remix)	2011	Rihanna, Calvin Harris	none
"Bad Bitches Only"	2013	Brisco, Whyl Chyl	none
"Sunshine"	2013	Limp Bizkit, Birdman, Caskey	Rich Gang
"Whatever"	2014	Gorilla Zoe	Recovery
"There Goes My Baby"	2014	Enrique Iglesias	Sex and Love
"Got Me Runnin' Round"	2014	Nickelback	No Fixed Address
"Heels On" (Remix)	2014	Lady Saw	Alter Ego
"Booty Grande"	2018	De La Ghetto	Mi Movimiento
"You Don't Know Me"	2018	Sigala, Shaun Frank, Delaney Jane	Brighter Days
"Ocupado"	2019	Pitbull, Yomil y El Dany	Libertad 548
"Bouncy House"	2021	none	Tom & Jerry (Original Motion Picture Soundtrack)

== Music videos ==
=== As lead artist ===
List of music videos as lead artist, showing year released and directors
Title	Year	Director(s)
"Low" (featuring T-Pain)	2007	Bernard Gourley
"Elevator" (featuring Timbaland)	2008	Gil Green
"In the Ayer" (featuring will.i.am)	2008	Shane Drake
"Right Round" (featuring Kesha)	2009	Malcolm Jones
"Shone" (featuring Pleasure P)	2009	Zollo
"Sugar" (featuring Wynter Gordon)	2009	Shane Drake
"Available" (featuring Akon)	2009	David Rousseau
"Jump" (featuring Nelly Furtado)	2009	Chris Robinson
"Club Can't Handle Me" (featuring David Guetta)	2010	Marc Klasfeld
"Turn Around (5, 4, 3, 2, 1)"	2010	Dale Resteghini
"Who Dat Girl" (featuring Akon)	2011	Ray Kay
"Good Feeling"	2011	Erik White
"Wild Ones" (featuring Sia)	2011	Erik White
"Whistle"	2012	Marc Klasfeld
"I Cry"	2012	Marc Klasfeld
"Hey Jasmin"	2012	Wuz Good
"Let It Roll"	2013	Jessy Terrero
"Can't Believe It" (featuring Pitbull)	2013	Geremy & Georgie Legs
"How I Feel"	2013	Shane Drake
"G.D.F.R." (featuring Sage the Gemini and Lookas)	2014	Malcolm Jones
"My House"	2015	Alex Acosta
"Once in a Lifetime"	2015	Jon J
"Hello Friday"	2016	Alex Acosta
"Snack" (featuring E-40 and Sage the Gemini)	2019	Alex Acosta

=== As featured artist ===
List of music videos as featured artist, showing year released and directors
Title	Year	Director(s)
"Move Shake Drop" (DJ Laz featuring Flo Rida and Casely)	2008	none
"Running Back" (Jessica Mauboy featuring Flo Rida)	2008	Fin Edquist
"Good Girls Like Bad Boys" (Jadyn Maria featuring Flo Rida)	2009	Claire Carre
"Bad Boys" (Alexandra Burke featuring Flo Rida)	2009	Bryan Barber
"Dancin' for Me" (J. Lewis featuring Flo Rida)	2010	Jeffrey Elmont
"You Make the Rain Fall" (Kevin Rudolf featuring Flo Rida)	2010	Alex Moors
"Higher" (The Saturdays featuring Flo Rida)	2010	Taylor Cohen
"Where Them Girls At" (David Guetta featuring Flo Rida and Nicki Minaj)	2011	Dave Meyers
"Hangover" (Taio Cruz featuring Flo Rida)	2011	Martin Weisz
"I'm Tired" (Phyllisa featuring Flo Rida)	2012	Kwame Kandekore
"Troublemaker" (Olly Murs featuring Flo Rida)	2012	Michael Baldwin
"I Don't Mind" (Timati featuring Flo Rida)	2013	Pavel Khudyakov
