= Be on You =

Single by Flo Rida featuring Ne-Yo

from the album R.O.O.T.S.
- Released: October 6, 2009
- Recorded: 2009
- Genre: Pop rap; R&B
- Label: Poe Boy; Atlantic
- Songwriters: Tor Erik Hermansen; Mikkel S. Eriksen; Shaffer Smith; Tramar Dillard
- Producers: Stargate; Ne-Yo

Flo Rida singles chronology
"Heartbreaker" (2009)	"Be on You" (2009)	"Bad Boys" (2009)

Ne-Yo singles chronology
"Part of the List" (2009)	"Be on You" (2009)	"Baby by Me" (2009)

"Be on You" is the fifth official single from Flo Rida's second album, R.O.O.T.S.. It features Ne-Yo and is produced by Stargate. Despite gaining much airplay in July 2009, the single wasn't officially released until October 2009, due to Flo Rida focusing on promoting his other single "Jump". It takes a famous line from the movie Anchorman: The Legend of Ron Burgundy and uses it as its chorus.

== Chart performance ==
"Be on You" entered the US Billboard Hot 100 at number 75 in April 2009, even though it was not released as a single. On July 30, 2009, "Be on You" along with "Jump", re-entered the Billboard 100 at numbers 90 and 76, respectively. It peaked at 19 in the United States, making it Flo Rida's sixth top 20 hit on the Hot 100.

== Charts ==
=== Weekly charts ===
Chart (2009)	Peak position
Canada Hot 100 (Billboard)	61
Canada CHR/Top 40 (Billboard)	28
UK Singles (Official Charts)	51
US Billboard Hot 100	19
US Hot Rap Songs (Billboard)	6
US Pop Airplay (Billboard)	18
US Rhythmic Airplay (Billboard)	3

=== Monthly charts ===
Chart (2010)	Peak position
Brazil (Brasil Hot 100 Airplay)	49
Brazil (Brasil Hot Pop Songs)	21

=== Year-end charts ===
Annual chart rankings
Chart (2009)	Position
US Rhythmic (Billboard)	24
US Radio Songs (Billboard)	98

== Certifications ==
Region	Certification	Certified units/sales
United States (RIAA)	Gold	500,000^{‡}
^{‡} Sales+streaming figures based on certification alone.
