= List of 2009 box office number-one films in Venezuela =

This is a list of films which have placed number one at the weekend box office in Venezuela during 2009.

== Number-one films ==
†	This implies the highest-grossing movie of the year.

#	Date	Film	Gross	Notes
1	January 4, 2009	Madagascar: Escape 2 Africa	$550,376	
2	January 11, 2009	Madagascar: Escape 2 Africa	$297,997	
3	January 18, 2009	Marley & Me	$348,255	
4	January 25, 2009	Yes Man	$497,903	
5	February 1, 2009	Yes Man	$488,980	
6	February 8, 2009	Yes Man	$340,864	
7	February 15, 2009	Bedtime Stories	$374,597	
8	February 22, 2009	Bedtime Stories	$379,182	
9	March 1, 2009	Bedtime Stories	$366,477	
10	March 8, 2009	Bedtime Stories	$282,502	
11	March 15, 2009	Bedtime Stories	$227,072	
12	March 22, 2009	Paul Blart: Mall Cop	$195,623	
13	March 29, 2009	Underworld: Rise of the Lycans	$181,379	
14	April 5, 2009	Monsters vs. Aliens	$496,701	
15	April 12, 2009	Fast & Furious	$622,498	
16	April 19, 2009	Fast & Furious	$607,076	
17	April 26, 2009	Fast & Furious	$359,373	
18	May 3, 2009	X-Men Origins: Wolverine	$723,449	
19	May 10, 2009	X-Men Origins: Wolverine	$338,374	
20	May 17, 2009	Angels & Demons	$757,952	
21	May 24, 2009	Night at the Museum: Battle of the Smithsonian	$893,928	
22	May 31, 2009	Night at the Museum: Battle of the Smithsonian	$787,730	
23	June 7, 2009	Up	$958,811	
24	June 14, 2009	Up	$934,905	
25	June 21, 2009	Up	$724,664	
26	June 28, 2009	Transformers: Revenge of the Fallen	$774,133	
27	July 5, 2009	Ice Age: Dawn of the Dinosaurs †	$1,547,891	Ice Age: Dawn of the Dinosaurs had the highest weekend debut of 2009.
28	July 12, 2009	Ice Age: Dawn of the Dinosaurs †	$1,459,762	
29	July 19, 2009	Harry Potter and the Half-Blood Prince	$1,340,597	
30	July 26, 2009	Ice Age: Dawn of the Dinosaurs †	$1,024,747	
31	August 2, 2009	Ice Age: Dawn of the Dinosaurs †	$666,373	
32	August 9, 2009	G-Force	$594,641	
33	August 16, 2009	G-Force	$551,256	
34	August 23, 2009	G-Force	$397,100	
35	August 30, 2009	The Hangover	$372,764	
36	September 6, 2009	The Hangover	$325,933	
37	September 13, 2009	The Taking of Pelham 123	$325,282	
38	September 20, 2009	The Taking of Pelham 123	$300,725	
39	September 27, 2009	The Ugly Truth	$245,942	
40	October 4, 2009	Surrogates	$321,466	
41	October 11, 2009	Cloudy with a Chance of Meatballs	$407,580	
42	October 18, 2009	Cloudy with a Chance of Meatballs	$407,842	
43	October 25, 2009	Cloudy with a Chance of Meatballs	$275,860	
44	November 1, 2009	Michael Jackson's This Is It	$577,522	
45	November 8, 2009	A Christmas Carol	$556,875	
46	November 15, 2009	2012	$975,899	
47	November 22, 2009	2012	$1,081,882	
48	November 29, 2009	2012	$957,336	
49	December 6, 2009	The Twilight Saga: New Moon	$1,309,237	
50	December 13, 2009	The Twilight Saga: New Moon	$788,316	
51	December 20, 2009	Avatar	$879,063	
52	December 27, 2009	Avatar	$1,075,807	

== Highest-grossing films ==
Highest-grossing films of 2009 in Venezuela
Rank	Title	Studio	Domestic Gross
1.	Ice Age: Dawn of the Dinosaurs	20th Century Fox / Blue Sky Studios	$11,644,527
2.	2012	Columbia Pictures	$8,046,572
3.	Up	Walt Disney Pictures / Pixar Animation Studios	$7,249,646
4.	Harry Potter and the Half-Blood Prince	Warner Bros. / Heyday Films	$6,610,040
5.	G-Force	Walt Disney Pictures	$5,183,475
6.	Avatar	20th Century Fox / Lightstorm Entertainment	$5,125,939
7.	Fast & Furious	Universal Pictures	$4,604,144
8.	Angels & Demons	Columbia	$4,444,803
9.	Night at the Museum: Battle of the Smithsonian	20th Century Fox	$4,372,866
10.	Transformers: Revenge of the Fallen	Paramount Pictures / Hasbro Studios	$4,030,620
