= G-Force (film) =

2009 film produced by Walt Disney Pictures

- Theatrical release poster
- Directed by: Hoyt H. Yeatman Jr.
- Screenplay by: Cormac Wibberley; Marianne Wibberley
- Story by: Hoyt H. Yeatman Jr.; David P.I. James
- Produced by: Jerry Bruckheimer
- Starring: Bill Nighy; Will Arnett; Zach Galifianakis; Nicolas Cage; Sam Rockwell; Jon Favreau; Penélope Cruz; Steve Buscemi; Tracy Morgan
- Cinematography: Bojan Bazelli
- Edited by: Jason Hellmann; Mark Goldblatt
- Music by: Trevor Rabin
- Production companies: Walt Disney Pictures; Jerry Bruckheimer Films
- Distributed by: Walt Disney Studios Motion Pictures
- Release date: July 24, 2009
- Running time: 88 minutes
- Country: United States
- Language: English
- Budget: $150 million
- Box office: $292.8 million

G-Force is a 2009 American spy adventure comedy film produced by Walt Disney Pictures and Jerry Bruckheimer Films. Directed by Hoyt Yeatman in his directorial debut and written by Cormac and Marianne Wibberley with a story by Yeatman, who worked in the area of visual effects alongside co-founding Dream Quest Images. The film stars Zach Galifianakis, Bill Nighy, and Will Arnett and also features the voices of Sam Rockwell, Tracy Morgan, Penélope Cruz, Jon Favreau, Nicolas Cage, and Steve Buscemi. Sony Pictures Imageworks handled the film's visual effects. The story follows Darwin (a guinea pig) and his team of specially trained rodents who, after failing a mission, must break out of a pet shop and stop an evil billionaire from taking over the world.

G-Force was released in the United States on July 24, 2009. It grossed $292.8 million worldwide against a production budget of $150 million. It received mostly negative reviews from critics.

== Plot ==
A special government program that uses intelligent rodents as secret agents is facing abolition from the FBI. To save the department, Ben Kendall, the head of the program, orders an unauthorized mission for the primary field team known as G-Force, consisting of guinea pigs Darwin, Blaster, and Juarez, the mole Speckles, and the fly Mooch. The mission is to infiltrate the residence of home electronics magnate Leonard Saber and acquire information about a new microchip he has developed. Darwin finds a classified file titled Clusterstorm on Saber's personal computer, containing plans for global extermination, and downloads it to his PDA. The next day, the file turns out to be false, resulting in Ben's superior Kip Killian shutting down the program. He orders the animals' capture, forcing Darwin, Blaster, Juarez, and Speckles to escape and hide in a delivery truck that goes to a pet store.

After being locked up in a cage, the group meets Hurley, another guinea pig, Bucky, a cocky hamster, and three mice. Determined to finish their mission, each of them forms an escape plan. Blaster and Juarez get themselves sold to a family, while Speckles pretends to be dead to be buried, but is thrown into a garbage truck instead, seemingly crushed to death. Darwin escapes with Hurley, who becomes convinced that Darwin is his long-lost brother due to their birthmark. While Blaster and Juarez escape their new owners, Ben and his assistant Marcie retrieve Darwin's PDA and discover that it is infected with an extermination virus. Saber holds a meeting with his associates, including his prime engineer Mr. Yanshu, and reports that Clusterstorm will launch in less than 48 hours.

On their way to Ben's house, Darwin and Hurley see a Saberling coffee machine, and Darwin decides to investigate it. Upon trying to remove its microchip, the coffee machine turns into a violent robot, but is destroyed. After hearing of what happened to Speckles, Ben reveals to the team that none of them were genetically engineered as they believed. They were rescued from various places, and Darwin was bought from a pet shop just like Hurley told him earlier. Despite learning their true origins, the team still has faith in themselves and decide to use the infected PDA to shut down the microchips.

At Saber's mansion, G-Force tries to reach the mainframe, but Hurley accidentally steps on a bomb-trap, causing an explosion which separates Blaster and Juarez from Darwin. Clusterstorm activates, turning all Saberling products into killing machines. Arriving in Saber's basement, Darwin discovers that Speckles has survived and is Mr. Yanshu, the mastermind behind Clusterstorm. Speckles elaborates his plan to use the Saberling products for a bombardment of space debris to make Earth uninhabitable, therefore destroying humanity as revenge for killing his family. It is revealed that he staged the false file during the team's briefing with the FBI to keep his scheme from coming to light. He combines the various appliances into a giant robot, which overpowers the police. Darwin falls from above, losing the PDA in the process, but Hurley saves him and lifts Darwin up to the robot.

Darwin tries to convince Speckles to change his ways, reminding him of how Ben took them in and made them a real family. Realizing his plan will cost him the only family he has left, Speckles unsuccessfully attempts to shut down the system. Mooch recovers the PDA and Darwin uploads the virus to the main server, destroying the robot, while Juarez saves them from falling. They later find Hurley under the ruins, injured and unconscious. Darwin states that Hurley's actions were truly heroic, and finally acknowledges him as his brother. Hurley regains consciousness and joins the team.

G-Force receives personal recognition from the FBI Director, who tells them that Saber has been assigned to recall all his products, while Speckles is told to remove the microchips before rejoining the team. Killian is relocated to an FBI base on the South Pole as a punishment for trying to arrest G-Force. The FBI gives full support to Ben's program, with Bucky and the mice joining it, and Darwin, Blaster, Juarez, and Hurley become official FBI special agents.

== Cast ==
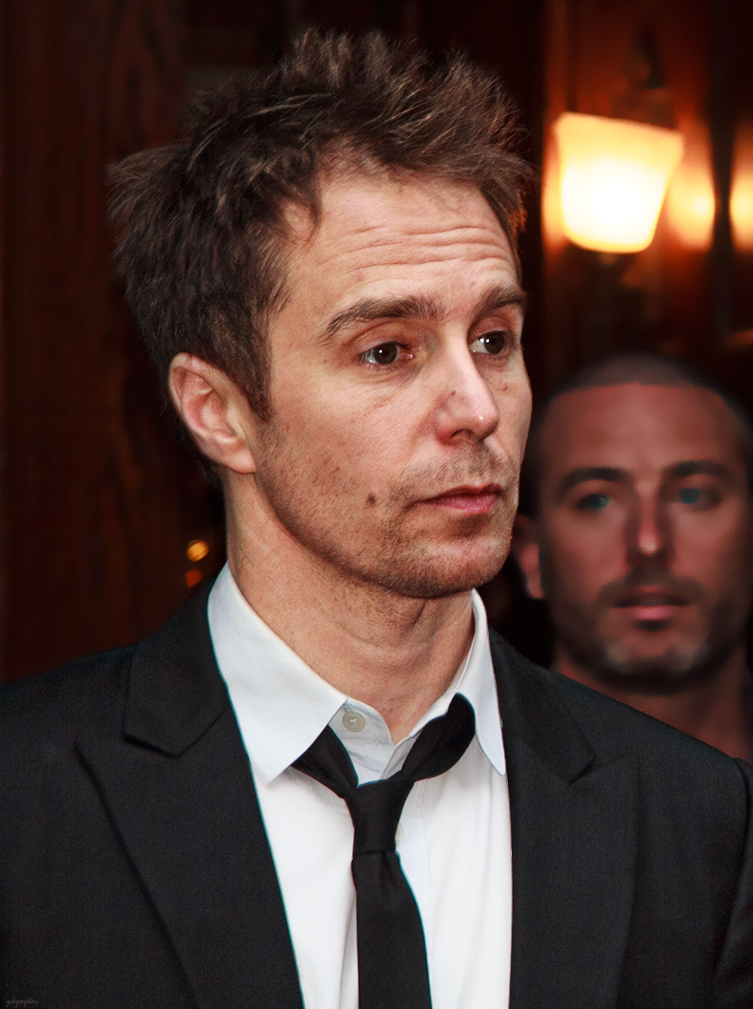
Sam Rockwell voiced Darwin

- Sam Rockwell as Darwin (FBI Special Agent), a snarky and no-nonsense crested guinea pig, the head of G-Force. He is one of Juarez’s love interests and Hurley's younger, long-lost brother.
- Tracy Morgan as Blaster (FBI Special Agent), a bombastic and excitable fox guinea pig, the weapons expert of G-Force who is West Point educated. He has a crush on Juarez.
- Penélope Cruz as Juarez (FBI Special Agent), a Spanish-accented and tomboyish female agouti guinea pig, the muscle of G-Force. She is Darwin and Blaster's love interest.
- Jon Favreau as Hurley (FBI Rookie), a laid-back and absent-minded Abyssinian guinea pig and Darwin's older, long-lost brother, though not really confirmed to be true.
- Nicolas Cage as Speckles / Mr. Yanshu, the cyber-intelligent star-nosed mole, the brains of G-Force with a secret agenda of his own.
- Zach Galifianakis as Dr. Ben Kendall, a scientist and the trainer of G-Force.
- Bill Nighy as Leonard Saber, a former weapons dealer and the head of Saberling Industries.
- Will Arnett as Agent Kip Killian, the leader of the FBI task force who has to track down G-Force dead or alive.
- Kelli Garner as Marcie Hollandsworth, Ben's assistant who helps G-Force escape from the FBI by transporting them in tubes.
- Steve Buscemi as Bucky, a territorial and aggressive golden hamster, mistakenly called a ferret, who is friends with a trio of sycophantic mice.
- Dee Bradley Baker as Mooch, a green bottle fly and the reconnaissance specialist of G-Force.
- Hoyt Yeatman IV and Max Favreau as the trio of sycophantic mice
- Roxana Ortega as Additional Voices
- Tyler Patrick Jones as Connor Goodman
- Piper Mackenzie Harris as Penny Goodman
- Jack Conley as Special Agent David Trygstad, one of Kip Killian's FBI special agents.
- Niecy Nash as Rosalita
- Justin Mentell as Terrell
- Gabriel Casseus as Special Agent Carter, one of Kip Killian's FBI special agents.
- Loudon Wainwright III as Grandpa
- Chris Ellis as the FBI Director who Kendall and G-Force answer to
- Mini Andén as Leonard Saber's assistant

== Production ==
=== Development ===
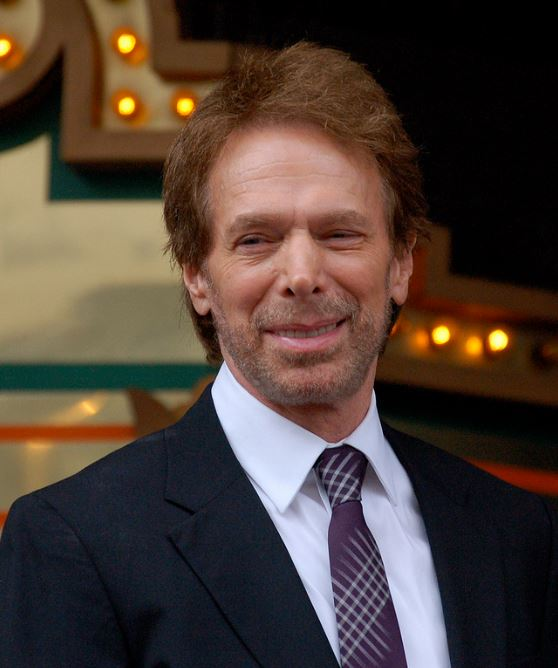
Producer Jerry Bruckheimer

Director Hoyt Yeatman's son, Hoyt Yeatman IV, came up with the original idea for the film when he was five years old. Yeatman liked his son's story so much that he brought it to producer Jerry Bruckheimer.

On 14 October 2008, Hoyt Yeatman was set to direct G-Force. Cormac and Marianne Wibberley wrote the script for the film. Jerry Bruckheimer produced the film with the budget of $150 million for release in 2009. On 17 October, it was announced that Sam Rockwell, Tracy Morgan, Penélope Cruz, Nicolas Cage, Jon Favreau, Steve Buscemi, Zach Galifianakis, Bill Nighy, Kelli Garner, Will Arnett, Gabriel Casseus and Jack Conley joined the film. Dee Bradley Baker joined the cast on 12 November to play Mooch, a housefly. On 18 November, it was announced that Trevor Rabin would compose the music for the film. On 23 November, Walt Disney Studios Motion Pictures acquired distribution rights to the film. Development of the film was completed in Los Angeles, California. Production then moved to Santa Clarita, California for the final phases of animation and production in order to maximize tax credits offered to foreign film projects in America.

=== Music ===
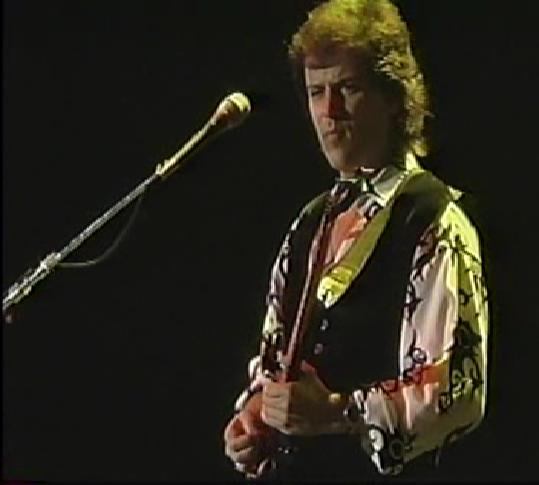
Trevor Rabin scored the music for the film

Trevor Rabin scored the music for the film. The soundtrack contains "I Gotta Feeling" and "Boom Boom Pow" performed by The Black Eyed Peas, "Just Dance" performed by Lady Gaga and Colby O'Donis, "Jump" performed by Flo Rida and Nelly Furtado, "Don't Cha" performed by The Pussycat Dolls and Busta Rhymes, "Mexicano" performed by Tremander, "Ready to Rock" performed by Steve Rushton, "How Do You Sleep?" performed by Jesse McCartney and Ludacris, "Falling Down" performed by Space Cowboy and "O Fortuna" performed by London Symphony Orchestra & Richard Hickox.

=== Filming ===
G-Force was filmed at 992 S Oakland Avenue, Pasadena, California, USA, Culver Studios – 9336 W. Washington Blvd., Culver City, California, USA, Los Angeles, California, USA and Santa Clarita, California, USA in 2009.

== Release ==
=== Theatrical release ===
G-Force was theatrically released on July 24, 2009 in Disney Digital 3D by Walt Disney Pictures and Jerry Bruckheimer Films.

=== Home media ===
G-Force was released on DVD and Blu-ray on December 15, 2009 by Walt Disney Studios Home Entertainment.

== Reception ==
=== Box office ===
G-Force grossed $119,436,770 in North America and $173,381,071 internationally for a worldwide total of $292,817,841, against a budget of $150 million.

North America

In its opening weekend, the film earned $31.7 million, ranking at No. 1, and replacing Harry Potter and the Half-Blood Prince. The film declined −44.8% on its second week behind Funny People and Harry Potter and the Half-Blood Prince.

=== Critical response ===
On review aggregator Rotten Tomatoes, the film holds an approval rating of 21% based on 126 reviews, with an average rating of 4.40/10. The website's critics consensus reads: "G-Force features manic action, but fails to come up with interesting characters or an inspired plot." On Metacritic, the film has a weighted average score of 41 out of 100, based on 19 critics, indicating "mixed or average" reviews. Roger Ebert of the Chicago Sun-Times gave the film 2.5 stars out of four and called it "a pleasant, inoffensive 3-D animated farce". Audiences polled by CinemaScore gave the film an average grade of "B+" on an A+ to F scale.

Steven Rea of The Philadelphia Inquirer gave it a two-out-of-four rating and wrote, "Just about the only folks likely to find this humdrum hybrid of Mission: Impossible and The Wind in the Willows worthy for consideration are non-discriminating pip-squeaks happy to watch rodents rappelling walls and scampering along air ducts".

=== Awards ===
ASCAP Film and Television Music Awards 2010

Award	Category	Nominee	Result
ASCAP Award	Top Box Office Films	Trevor Rabin	Won

Visual Effects Society Awards 2010

Award	Category	Nominee	Result
VES Award	Outstanding Animated Character in a Live Action Feature Motion Picture	Benjamin Cinelli (senior character animator), Peter Tieryas (character set-up technical director), Dustin Wicke (lead cloth and hair) and Ryan Yee (animator) For Bucky.	Nominated

== Video game ==
The video game based on the film was released for PlayStation 3, PlayStation 2, Xbox 360, Wii, PlayStation Portable, Nintendo DS and Microsoft Windows on July 21, 2009. The PS3 and Xbox 360 versions come with 3-D glasses.

Darwin appears as a playable character in the mobile game Disney Heroes: Battle Mode.

== Soundtrack ==
G-Force

Soundtrack album by various artists
- Released: May 1, 2009
- Recorded: 2009
- Genre: Film Soundtrack
- Label: Walt Disney
- Producer: Various artists

Trevor Rabin film scores chronology
Race to Witch Mountain (2009)	G-Force (2009)	The Sorcerer's Apprentice (2010)

Singles from G-Force: Original Motion Picture Soundtrack
- 1. "Jump" Released: July 17, 2009; 2. "Ready to Rock" Released: 2009

G-Force: Original Motion Picture Soundtrack was released in May 2009 by Walt Disney Records.

=== Soundtrack list ===
- "I Gotta Feeling" – Performed by The Black Eyed Peas
- "Boom Boom Pow" – Performed by The Black Eyed Peas
- "Just Dance" – Performed by Lady Gaga and Colby O'Donis
- "Jump" – Performed by Flo Rida and Nelly Furtado
- "Don't Cha" – Performed by The Pussycat Dolls and Busta Rhymes
- "Mexicano" – Performed by Tremander
- "Ready to Rock" – Performed by Steve Rushton
- "How Do You Sleep?" – Performed by Jesse McCartney and Ludacris
- "Falling Down" – Performed by Space Cowboy
- "O Fortuna" – Performed by London Symphony Orchestra & Richard Hickox

In Japan, the film has a different theme song "Dake! G-Force" by Murasaki Shikiku.
