= Cake (Flo Rida song) =

Single by Flo Rida and 99 Percent

from the album This Is a Challenge
- Released: February 28, 2017
- Recorded: 2016
- Genre: Pop-rap
- Length: 3:04
- Label: International Music Group; Poe Boy; Atlantic
- Songwriters: Tramar Dillard; Cameron Schauer; Charlie Puth; Johnnie Jacob Jr.; Breyan Staley Isaac; Danny Majic; Dillon Deskin; Kell Egan
- Producers: Foolish Ways; Danny Majic

Flo Rida singles chronology
"Zillionaire" (2016)	"Cake" (2017)	"Hola" (2017)

"Cake" is a song by the American rapper Flo Rida, from the Atlantic Records compilation album, This Is a Challenge. The song features the American rap duo 99 Percent. It was released to contemporary hit radio as a single on February 28, 2017.

== Music video ==
The official music video was released March 15, 2017.

== Commercial performance ==
The song debuted at number 89 on the Billboard Hot 100 for the week ending May 6, 2017. It peaked at number 73, charting for six weeks. To date, it remains Flo Rida's last Hot 100 appearance.

== Charts ==
Chart (2017)	Peak position
US Billboard Hot 100	73
US Pop Airplay (Billboard)	23

== Certifications ==
Region	Certification	Certified units/sales
New Zealand (RMNZ)	Gold	15,000^{‡}
United States (RIAA)	Gold	500,000^{‡}
^{‡} Sales+streaming figures based on certification alone.
