= Zillionaire =

Single by Flo Rida
- Released: July 29, 2016
- Genre: Pop; pop rap
- Length: 3:52
- Label: International Music Group; Poe Boy; Atlantic
- Songwriters: Ross Golan; Johan Carlsson; Alexander Kronlund; Marco Borrero; Breyan Isaac; Tramar Dillard
- Producers: Johan Carlsson; Mag

Flo Rida singles chronology
| "Greenlight" (2016) | "Zillionaire" (2016) | "Cake" (2017) |

"Zillionaire" is a song by American rapper Flo Rida, released on July 29, 2016, in the United States. Remixes followed September 16, 2016.

== Music video ==
The official music video was released December 6, 2016, featuring Chanel Iman. A second music video, which takes place in Dubai Directed by Alex Acosta, was released July 13, 2017.

== Other media ==
The song was featured in the trailer for Masterminds, a film starring Zach Galifianakis, Kristen Wiig, Leslie Jones, Owen Wilson, and Jason Sudeikis.

== Track listings ==
Digital download

1. "Zillionaire" – 3:52

Digital download – remixes

1. "Zillionaire" (Jaykode Remix) – 3:34
2. "Zillionaire" (Riot Ten Remix) – 4:06
3. "Zillionaire" (Gianni Remix) – 3:09

== Charts ==
Chart performance for "Zillionaire"
| Chart (2016) | Peak position |
|---|---|
| Sweden Heatseeker (Sverigetopplistan) | 16 |
| UK Singles (Official Charts) | 174 |
