= J Rand =

American singer

- Also known as: JRand; J Randall; Josh Randall; Heart Break Kid (hbk)
- Born: Joshua Paul Randall; 15 April 1987 (age 39); Delray Beach, Florida
- Genres: Pop, R&B, hip hop
- Occupations: Singer, songwriter, dancer, actor
- Instrument: Vocals
- Years active: 2010–present
- Labels: Interscope, Geffen, Poe Boy
- Website: www.jrandmusic.com

Joshua Paul Randall (born 15 April 1987), known professionally as J Rand (and formerly known as "J Randall"), is an American singer, songwriter, actor and dancer. He was formerly signed to Interscope Records but left the label in early 2013. Following a performance alongside Flo Rida on The Tonight Show with Jay Leno, USA TODAY named J Rand their "Artist on the Verge" for 2014. In 2017 he particapted with the boyband 5 alive at the talent show America's got talent. At the end of 2017 till November 2018 he was part of the musical show "Boybands Forever" and toured with 5 other boys in Germany. Shortly before the second tour in the fall of 2018 he published his new song "October" and used the tour and his fans to promote this and other songs. Since 2020 he hosts the online version of the talent show America's Idol" called IG Idol.

== Discography ==
=== Singles ===
- "Spirit of the Radio" (Step Up 3D Soundtrack) (2010)
- "Up Against the Wall" (2012)
- October (2018)

=== Promotional Releases ===
- "Can't Sleep" (feat. T-Pain) (2011)
- "Ride" (feat. Flo Rida & T-Pain) (2013)
- "Santa Gimme" (2013)
- "Sexual Habit" (2014)
- "Gold" (2015)
- ”October” (2018)

=== Featured in ===
- 2016: "Oh La La La" (Carolina Márquez feat. Akon & J Rand)

=== Mixtapes ===
- Heart Break Kid (2012)

== Filmography ==
=== Television ===
Year	Title	Role	Notes
2007	Burn Notice	Greg	Season 1, Episode 2: "Identity"
2010	The Glades	Zach Coulter	Season 1, Episode 2: "Bird in the Hand"

=== Films ===
Year	Title	Role	Notes
2007	Cyn	Mr. Sugar	(Short Film)
2008	Bachelor Party 2: The Last Temptation	Spence	(Direct-to-video)
2008	Trumpet for Hire	Josh	(Short Film)
2010	Promises	Sean	
2010	Loving the Bad Man	Joey Thompson	
2010	Wild Things: Foursome	Shane Hendricks	(Direct-to-video)
2010	Step Up 3D	"Spirit of the Radio"	Soundtrack
2012	Rock of Ages	Z-Guy Donny	
2012	Spring Breakers	Jock	
