= Jump (Flo Rida song) =

2009 single by Flo Rida ft. Nelly Furtado

Single by Flo Rida featuring Nelly Furtado

from the album R.O.O.T.S. and G-Force: Original Motion Picture Soundtrack
- Released: July 17, 2009
- Recorded: 2008
- Studio: Metalworks Studios (Toronto, ON); Paramount Studios (Los Angeles, CA); Poe Boy Studios (Miami, FL)
- Genre: Pop-rap
- Length: 3:28
- Label: Poe Boy Entertainment; Atlantic
- Songwriters: Mike Caren; Esther Dean; Nelly Furtado; Tracel Dillard; Travis Barker; Oliver Goldstein
- Producers: Barker; Caren; Goldstein

Flo Rida singles chronology
"Cause a Scene" (2009)	"Jump" (2009)	"Heartbreaker" (2009)

Nelly Furtado singles chronology
"Manos al Aire" (2009)	"Jump" (2009)	"Más" (2009)

"Jump" is a song by American rapper Flo Rida, released by Atlantic Records and Poe Boy Entertainment on July 17, 2009 as the fourth single from his second album, R.O.O.T.S. (2009). It features a guest appearance from Canadian singer Nelly Furtado, who provides the song's hook. Production was handled by Blink-182 drummer Travis Barker, record executive Mike Caren, and Oliver "Oligee" Goldstein of the musical duo Oliver. Flo Rida, Furtado, Barker, Goldstein, and American singer Ester Dean each co-wrote the track.

"Jump" became Flo Rida's eighth consecutive Billboard Hot 100 entry — peaking at number 54. The song was used to promote the Disney film G-Force, and an edited version was added to Radio Disney's playlist. Flo Rida said: "I used a whole different delivery on this one. We're talking about different situations to get people hype in the club. 'Jump!' Whether you're an athlete running in the stadium or you're in the club. Get hype!"

== Chart performance ==
"Jump" entered the Canadian Hot 100 Chart for 3 weeks and The Billboard Hot 100 chart for 1 week. Since the song was not initially released as a single or for airplay, the chart performance relied on only digital sales. The single re-entered at number 76 on Billboard Hot 100, due to G-Force taking the #1 spot its opening week. The single peaked at #54, making it the first single from Flo Rida not to crack Top 20 in the US. The song appeared in the American Top 40 for one week. It debuted at #40, and it fell outside the top 40 on the next week. "Jump" was most successful in Australia and peaked at #18, making it Flo Rida's 5th song to reach the top 20 there.

== Music video ==
The music video was filmed in May 2009 by Chris Robinson. The video premiered worldwide on July 11, 2009, featuring clips from G-Force. The video premiered on BET's 106 & Park on August 13, 2009.

== Track listing ==
Japanese digital single

- "Jump" (Let's Go Ichiro Remix)

== Charts ==
Chart (2009)	Peak position
Australia (ARIA)	18
Austria (Ö3 Austria Top 40)	34
Belgium (Ultratip Bubbling Under Flanders)	8
Canada Hot 100 (Billboard)	32
Canada CHR/Top 40 (Billboard)	44
Germany (GfK)	27
Ireland (IRMA)	26
Japan Hot 100 (Billboard)	91
New Zealand (Recorded Music NZ)	33
Russia (Top Radio Hits)	57
Scotland Singles (Official Charts)	9
UK Singles (Official Charts)	21
US Billboard Hot 100	54
US Pop Airplay (Billboard)	35

=== Certifications ===
Region	Certification	Certified units/sales
United States (RIAA)	Gold	500,000^{‡}
^{‡} Sales+streaming figures based on certification alone.

== Release history ==
Region	Date	Format
Australia	July 17, 2009	Digital download
Worldwide	July 28, 2009	Digital download
United Kingdom	August 10, 2009	CD single
Japan	August 19, 2009	Digital download
Germany	October 16, 2009	CD single, digital download
