= R.O.O.T.S. =

Studio album by Flo Rida
- Released: March 24, 2009
- Recorded: December 2008–February 2009
- Genre: Pop rap
- Length: 50:50
- Labels: Poe Boy; Atlantic
- Producers: Travis Barker; Benny Blanco; Mike Caren; DJ Montay; Dr. Luke; Dre & Vidal; Eric Hudson; Happy Perez; Jim Jonsin; JRock; Kool Kojak; Christopher "Spitfiya" Lanier; Ne-Yo; Oligee; Sounwave; Stargate; will.i.am

Flo Rida chronology
Mail on Sunday (2008)	R.O.O.T.S. (2009)	Only One Flo (Part 1) (2010)

Singles from R.O.O.T.S.
- 1. "Right Round" Released: January 27, 2009; 2. "Shone" Released: February 24, 2009; 3. "Sugar" Released: March 17, 2009; 4. "Jump" Released: July 17, 2009; 5. "Be on You" Released: October 6, 2009; 6. "Available" Released: November 23, 2009

R.O.O.T.S. (backronym for Route of Overcoming the Struggle) is the second studio album by American rapper Flo Rida. It was released on March 24, 2009, by Poe Boy Entertainment and Atlantic Records.

== Background ==
In an interview with Billboard Magazine, Flo Rida stated the inspiration for the album comes from his success and knowing that it wasn’t an overnight thing. "It also takes inspiration to turn an album, so I had to really get everything together." Flo Rida has also stated that the album cover was done this way because he admittedly has an 'addiction to being shirtless' and he wanted to show his body, and show his addiction to the world.

== Singles ==
"Right Round" was released as the album's lead single, and became Flo Rida's second number-one hit. Released on January 25, 2009, the song debuted at number 58 on the US Billboard Hot 100 on February 18, 2009. The song sold a record breaking 636,000 digital copies in its first week, breaking his own record that he had set with his hit single "Low". Though uncredited the song with singer Kesha as a guest vocalist. The song jumped to number 1 on the Billboard Hot 100, and Billboard Pop 100. In its second week, the song sold another 460,000 downloads, the third highest one-week record, topping the one million mark in paid downloads in just two weeks, and becoming the fastest million-selling download ever in the United States. It ended up staying at number 1 for six consecutive weeks.

"Shone" was released digitally as the album's second single on February 24, 2009, and it has peaked at number 57 on the US Billboard Hot 100.

"Sugar" was released as the album's third single on March 17, 2009. It debuted on the US Billboard Hot 100 chart at number 25, making it Flo Rida's highest debut to date, and peaked at number 5 in the United States, also it has peaked at number 18 in the United Kingdom. The song features R&B singer Wynter Gordon as a guest vocalist.

"Jump" is the album's fourth single and was released on July 27, 2009 in the United Kingdom, and July 28, 2009 worldwide. The song features Canadian singer Nelly Furtado as a guest vocal. As of August 13, 2009 it has peaked at number 54 in the United States, number 27 in Canada, number 21 in the United Kingdom and number 18 in Australia.

"Be on You" was released as the album's fifth single on October 6, 2009. The song features American singer Ne-Yo as a guest vocalist. When the album was released the single debuted at number 90 in the United States. The song has received airplay since the album's release, and has since peaked at number 19 in the United States, and number 51 in the United Kingdom.

"Available" featuring fellow singer Akon, was released as the album's sixth single in the United Kingdom on November 23, 2009.

== Reception ==
Professional ratings
Aggregate scores
Source	Rating
Metacritic	62/100
Review scores
Source	Rating
AllMusic	3/5 stars
Billboard	(favorable)
Entertainment Weekly	(B)
The Guardian	3/5 stars
Los Angeles Times	3/4 stars
The New York Times	(mixed)
USA Today	3/4 stars

Initial critical response to R.O.O.T.S. was generally positive. At Metacritic, which assigns a normalized rating out of 100 to reviews from mainstream critics, the album has received a score of 62, indicating generally favorable reviews. The album was nominated for best rap album at the 52nd Grammy Awards, but lost to Relapse by Eminem.

== Sales ==
In the United States, R.O.O.T.S. debuted at number 8 on the Billboard 200, selling 55,000 copies in its first week. In August 2009, the album has sold 223,000 copies in the United States. Closing out the same year, the album sold 300,000 copies becoming the eighth best-selling rap album of 2009.

== Track listing ==
No.	Title	Writer(s)	Producer(s)	Length
1.	"Finally Here"	Tramar Dillard; Mark Spears; Sly Jordan	Sounwave; Christopher "Spitfiya" Lanier for The Bullets Production Team	4:03
2.	"Jump" (featuring Nelly Furtado)	Dillard; Mike Caren; Travis Barker; Oliver Goldstein; Nelly Furtado; Ester Dean	Mike Caren; Oligee; Travis Barker*	3:28
3.	"Gotta Get It (Dancer)"	Dillard; Caren; Goldstein; Mark Knopfler	Caren; Oligee	4:00
4.	"Shone" (featuring Pleasure P)	Dillard; James Scheffer; Richard Butler, Jr.; Andre Harris; Vidal Davis; Rex Zamor	Jim Jonsin; Dre & Vidal	4:13
5.	"Right Round" (featuring Kesha)	Dillard; Lukasz Gottwald; Allan Grigg; Justin Franks; Philip Lawrence; Bruno Mars; Aaron Bay-Schuck; Peter Burns; Stephen Coy; Michael Percy; Timothy Lever	Dr. Luke; Kool Kojak	3:22
6.	"R.O.O.T.S."	Dillard; Jean Borges	JRock	3:45
7.	"Be on You" (featuring Ne-Yo)	Dillard; Shaffer Smith; Mikkel Storleer Eriksen; Tor Erik Hermansen	Stargate; Ne-Yo*	4:03
8.	"Mind on My Money"	Dillard; Eric Hudson; Noel "Detail" Fisher	Eric Hudson	3:32
9.	"Available" (featuring Akon)	Dillard; William Adams; Aliaune Thiam; Harold Clayton; Sigidi Abdullah	will.i.am	4:25
10.	"Touch Me" (featuring Kesha (Note: Kesha provides uncredited vocals.))	Dillard; Gottwald; Benjamin Levin; K. Sebert	Dr. Luke; Benny Blanco	3:11
11.	"Never"	Dillard; Nathan Perez	Happy Perez	4:22
12.	"Sugar" (featuring Wynter Gordon)	Dillard; Montay Humphrey; Carlos Battey; Steven Battey; Maurizio Lobina; Gianfranco Randone; Massimo Gabutti; William Jones; Mike Caren	DJ Montay; Mike Caren	4:13
13.	"Rewind" (featuring Wyclef Jean)	Dillard; Theron Thomas; Timothy Thomas; Kobe R; Wyclef Jean; Maurice Carpenter; Leigh Elliott; Johnny Mollings; Lenny Mollings	The Inkredibles	4:29
Total length:				50:50

Rhapsody bonus track
No.	Title	Length
14.	"Balla" (featuring Brisco and Billy Blue)	3:32

Napster bonus track
No.	Title	Producer(s)	Length
14.	"Nobody" (featuring Brisco and Ball Greezy)	Dr. Luke; Kojak	3:28

Singapore digital bonus track
No.	Title	Writer(s)	Producer(s)	Length
14.	"Right Round" (featuring Kesha) (instrumental)	Dillard; Gottwald; Grigg; Franks; Lawrence; Mars; Bay-Schuck; Burns; Coy; Percy; Lever	Dr. Luke; Kool Kojak	3:22

Amazon MP3 bonus track
No.	Title	Length
14.	"Yayo" (featuring Brisco, Billy Blue, Ball Greezy, Rick Ross, Red Eyezz, Bred, Pitbull and Ace Hood)	7:53

iTunes Store bonus track
No.	Title	Length
14.	"Ha" (featuring Brisco and 4 Mill)	3:54

Japanese CD bonus track
No.	Title	Length
15.	"Yayo" (featuring Brisco, Billy Blue, Ball Greezy, Rick Ross, Red Eyezz, Bred, Pitbull and Ace Hood)	7:53

Japanese CD reissue bonus tracks
No.	Title	Length
16.	"Right Round" (featuring Kesha) (Benny Bennasi remix)
17.	"Jump" (featuring Nelly Furtado) (Let's Go Ichiro remix)
18.	"The Next Door" (Exile featuring Jason Derulo)

European and Mexican digital bonus tracks
No.	Title	Writer(s)	Producer(s)	Length
14.	"Low" (featuring T-Pain)	Dillard; Montay Humphrey; T-Pain	DJ Montay	3:50
15.	"Right Round" (featuring Kesha) (instrumental)	Dillard; Gottwald; Grigg; Franks; Lawrence; Mars; Bay-Schuck; Burns; Coy; Percy; Lever	Dr. Luke; Kool Kojak	3:22
16.	"In the Ayer" (featuring will.i.am) (Jason Nevins mix)	Dillard; William Adams; Tony Butler	will.i.am	3:33

International digital store bonus content
No.	Title	Writer(s)	Producer(s)	Length
14.	"Low" (featuring T-Pain)	Dillard; Montay Humphrey; T-Pain	DJ Montay	3:50
15.	"Right Round" (featuring Kesha) (music video)			3:26
16.	"Shone" (featuring Pleasure P) (music video)			3:23
17.	"Right Round" (featuring Kesha) (instrumental)	Dillard; Gottwald; Grigg; Franks; Lawrence; Mars; Bay-Schuck; Burns; Coy; Percy; Lever	Dr. Luke; Kool Kojak	3:22

== Charts ==
=== Weekly charts ===
Chart (2009)	Peak position
Australian Albums (ARIA)	6
Australian Urban Albums (ARIA)	1
Austrian Albums (Ö3 Austria)	21
Belgian Albums (Ultratop Flanders)	19
Belgian Albums (Ultratop Wallonia)	55
Canadian Albums (Billboard)	6
Dutch Albums (Album Top 100)	69
French Albums (SNEP)	25
German Albums (Offizielle Top 100)	21
Irish Albums (IRMA)	13
Italian Albums (FIMI)	99
Japanese Albums (Oricon)	7
New Zealand Albums (RMNZ)	13
Scottish Albums (Official Charts)	8
Swiss Albums (Schweizer Hitparade)	14
UK Albums (Official Charts)	5
UK R&B Albums (Official Charts)	1
US Billboard 200	8
US Top R&B/Hip-Hop Albums (Billboard)	6
US Top Rap Albums (Billboard)	3

=== Year-end charts ===
Chart (2009)	Position
Australian Albums (ARIA)	98
US Billboard 200	144
US Top R&B/Hip-Hop Albums (Billboard)	82

== Certifications ==
Region	Certification	Certified units/sales
Canada (Music Canada)	Platinum	80,000^{‡}
Japan (RIAJ)	Gold	100,000^{^}
New Zealand (RMNZ)	2× Platinum	30,000^{‡}
United Kingdom (BPI)	Gold	100,000^{‡}
United States (RIAA)	Platinum	1,000,000^{‡}
^{^} Shipments figures based on certification alone.^{‡} Sales+streaming figures based on certification alone.
