= Sugar (Flo Rida song) =

2009 single by Flo Rida

Single by Flo Rida featuring Wynter

from the album R.O.O.T.S.
- Released: March 17, 2009
- Recorded: 2009
- Genre: Electropop; hip hop; R&B
- Length: 4:12 (album version); 4:01 (radio edit)
- Label: Poe Boy; Atlantic
- Songwriters: Flo Rida; The Jackie Boyz; Jeffrey Jey; Maurizio Lobina; Massimo Gabutti
- Producer: DJ Montay

Flo Rida singles chronology
"Shone" (2009)	"Sugar" (2009)	"Cause a Scene" (2009)

Wynter Gordon singles chronology
"Sugar" (2009)	"Dirty Talk" (2010)

Audio sample
- "Sugar": file; help

"Sugar" is a song by American rapper Flo Rida, featuring American singer-songwriter Wynter Gordon. The song's chorus interpolates the song "Blue (Da Ba Dee)" by Italian electronic music group Eiffel 65. The song was written by Flo Rida, The Jackie Boyz, Jeffrey Jey, Maurizio Lobina, and Massimo Gabutti, and was produced by DJ Montay for Flo Rida's second album, R.O.O.T.S.. The song was released as the album's third official single in March 2009 as a digital download.

Despite mixed reviews from music critics, the single became the second top 10 single from R.O.O.T.S., debuting at number 25, and peaking at number five on the U.S. Billboard Hot 100, fueled by high sales from digital downloads. The single has also been successful in other countries, reaching the top ten in Canada, and on other Billboard subcharts. Following the song's success in the US, the song was released on May 25 in the United Kingdom.

== Background ==
Speaking to MTV News, Flo Rida said, "Wynter is a brand-new artist coming off of Atlantic Records. She has a beautiful voice. She matched the song very well, so we went along with it." Wynter was originally hired by the song's writers as a female vocalist to reference the song for them. "It sounded really good when I did it," she told Billboard. "They said, 'We'll keep you on it. This could be good for you.'"

== Critical reception ==
On reviews for the album, the song received a mixed reception from critics, who criticized the use of the interpolation of "Blue (Da Ba Dee)" and lyrical content, but praised Wynter's vocal performance. Billboard magazine reviewed the single positively, said "'Sugar', rides an unlikely interpolation of 'Blue (Da Ba Dee)' by Eiffel 65", but consider it one of the highlights of the album. However, AllMusic said that the song is "shameless enough to incorporate elements of Eiffel 65's Euro-trash earworm 'Blue (Da Ba Dee)'", but chose it as a track pick. Rap-Up said, "Hate him or love him, you gotta hand it to Flo Rida for mastering the hit-making formula. His second single off R.O.O.T.S., “Sugar,” samples Eiffel 65's “Blue (Da Ba Dee).” Flo's Atlantic Records labelmate Wynter Gordon gets her first major feature singing the hook. This has top 10 written all over it."

Meanwhile, in the UK, noted urban writer Pete Lewis of the award-winning Blues & Soul stated "Flo Rida finally proves once-and-for-all that he's no one-trick-pony, with the melodic uptempo single 'Sugar' effectively relying on a familiar Euro-dance sample to bring the party".

== Music video ==
Flo Rida beside his imaginary girl portrayed by Wynter in the music video for "Sugar."

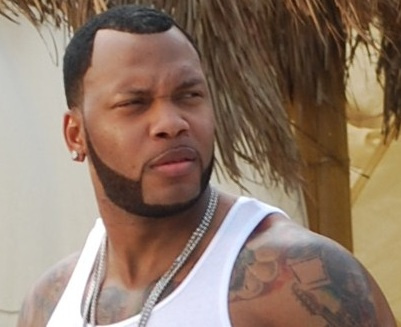
Flo Rida on the set of "Sugar".

The music video for the song was directed by Shane Drake and was filmed on April 10, 2009 in South Beach, Florida. It opens with a female doctor followed by Flo Rida walking into an operation room with a quick shot of Wynter then Wynter and Flo Rida standing beside one another. It then cuts to Wynter performing set choreography interspersed with female dancers then her dancing solo with flashes of Flo Rida undergoing general anesthesia in the operation room by the same female doctor spotted earlier in the music video. The next primary scene showcases Flo Rida in front of other men each seated in a hut on the beach as they spot the doctor in a white bikini walking out from the water. Flo Rida moves out of his seat and progresses forward to greet the doctor but then confusingly realises that she is not actually there. Next Flo Rida and the doctor are seen to be next to each other on the same beach, she following with her arms on him as he raps. They walk to a store in the shape of another hut where Flo Rida purchases ice cream for the both of them. He turns around, confused again as the doctor doesn't appear anywhere in sight. The next scene displays the pair with the doctor seducing Flo Rida then comforting him with food. He then turns her way and once again, she doesn't appear. The final vision incorporates Flo Rida woken up by the doctor in the operation room & being escorted out, yet she then raises her arm and directs him to follow her back into the room by seductively holding up a bunch of grapes. Flo Rida looks at the camera, smiles and closes the door as the video comes to a close. The music video was uploaded to YouTube on May 16, 2019 as part of the 10 year anniversary of Flo Rida's album R.O.O.T.S.

== Chart performance ==
"Sugar" made a "Hot Shot Debut" at number 25 on the Billboard Hot 100, making it Flo Rida's highest debut on the chart. The song made a jump to number seven in its sixth week on the chart, selling 127,000 downloads, and eventually peaked at number five. In Canada it made a 'Hot Shot Debut' at number eight on the Canadian Hot 100.

The song debuted on the UK Singles Chart at number 35 from album downloads alone and peaked at number eighteen. This made "Sugar" Flo Rida's then-third highest charting single in the UK, and, with 18 weeks inside the top 100 UK singles chart, it was his fourth longest chart runner at the time behind only "Low" (75 weeks), "Right Round" (24 weeks) and "Elevator" (20 weeks). It peaked at number 20 in Australia.

== Charts ==
=== Weekly charts ===
Chart (2009)	Peak position
Australia (ARIA)	20
Austria (Ö3 Austria Top 40)	28
Belgium (Ultratop 50 Flanders)	40
Belgium (Ultratop 50 Wallonia)	21
Canada Hot 100 (Billboard)	8
CIS Airplay (TopHit)	31
Czech Republic Airplay (ČNS IFPI)	5
Europe (European Hot 100 Singles)	19
Finland (Suomen virallinen lista)	7
France (SNEP)	9
Germany (GfK)	37
Hungary (Dance Top 40)	30
Hungary (Rádiós Top 40)	25
Ireland (IRMA)	14
Italian Airplay (EarOne)	96
Japan Hot 100 (Billboard)	46
Netherlands (Dutch Top 40)	13
Netherlands (Single Top 100)	39
New Zealand (Recorded Music NZ)	26
Slovakia Airplay (ČNS IFPI)	18
Sweden (Sverigetopplistan)	31
Switzerland (Schweizer Hitparade)	40
UK Singles (Official Charts)	18
US Billboard Hot 100	5
US Dance Airplay (Billboard)	19
US Hot R&B/Hip-Hop Songs (Billboard)	100
US Hot Rap Songs (Billboard)	10
US Pop Airplay (Billboard)	15
US Rhythmic Airplay (Billboard)	9

=== Monthly charts ===
Chart (2009)	Peak position
Brazil (Brasil Hot 100 Airplay)	70

=== Year-end charts ===
Chart (2009)	Position
Australia Urban (ARIA)	35
Canada (Canadian Hot 100)	77
CIS (Tophit)	173
France (SNEP)	88
Hungary (Dance Top 40)	176
Hungary (Rádiós Top 40)	106
Netherlands (Dutch Top 40)	82
UK Singles (Official Charts Company)	132
US Billboard Hot 100	58
US Hot Rap Songs (Billboard)	35
US Rhythmic (Billboard)	37

== Certifications ==
Region	Certification	Certified units/sales
Canada (Music Canada)	Gold	20,000^{*}
Japan (RIAJ)	Gold	100,000^{*}
United Kingdom (BPI)	Silver	200,000^{‡}
United States (RIAA)	Platinum	1,000,000^{^}
^{*} Sales figures based on certification alone.^{^} Shipments figures based on certification alone.^{‡} Sales+streaming figures based on certification alone.
