= Shone (song) =

2009 single by Flo Rida and Pleasure P

Single by Flo Rida featuring Pleasure P

from the album R.O.O.T.S.
- B-side: "Right Round"
- Released: February 24, 2009
- Recorded: 2008
- Genre: Hip hop; R&B
- Length: 4:24 (album version); 3:25 (radio edit)
- Label: Poe Boy; Atlantic
- Songwriters: Tramar Dillard; Marcus Cooper; Jim Jonsin; Andre Harris; Vidal Harris; Richard Butler, Jr.
- Producers: Jim Jonsin; Dre & Vidal

Flo Rida singles chronology
"Feel It" (2009)	"Shone" (2009)	"Sugar" (2009)

"Shone" is a song by American rapper and singer Flo Rida, featuring fellow American singer Pleasure P. Produced by Jim Jonsin and Dre & Vidal, it was released as the second single from Flo Rida's second studio album R.O.O.T.S. in 2009. Initially, the song was used as a demo, with Rico Love singing the hook and second verse, which he also wrote.

== Music video ==
A music video for the song was uploaded to Myspace on 23 February 2009.

== Release ==
In the United States, "Shone" peaked at number 57 on the Billboard Hot 100 and at number 81 on the Billboard Hot R&B/Hip-Hop Songs chart. It also peaked at number 38 on the Canadian Hot 100.

== Charts ==
Chart (2009)	Peak position
Canada (Canadian Hot 100)	38
UK Singles (Official Charts Company)	144
US Billboard Hot 100	57
US Hot R&B/Hip-Hop Songs (Billboard)	81

== Release history ==
Country	Date	Format	Label
United States	24 February 2009	Digital download	Poe Boy; Atlantic Records
United Kingdom	24 February 2009	Digital download	Poe Boy; Atlantic Records
United States	10 March 2009	Contemporary hit radio	Poe Boy; Atlantic Records
United States	10 March 2009	Rhythmic contemporary radio	Poe Boy; Atlantic Records
United States	10 March 2009	Urban contemporary radio	Poe Boy; Atlantic Records
