= Brisco (rapper) =

American rapper (born 1982)

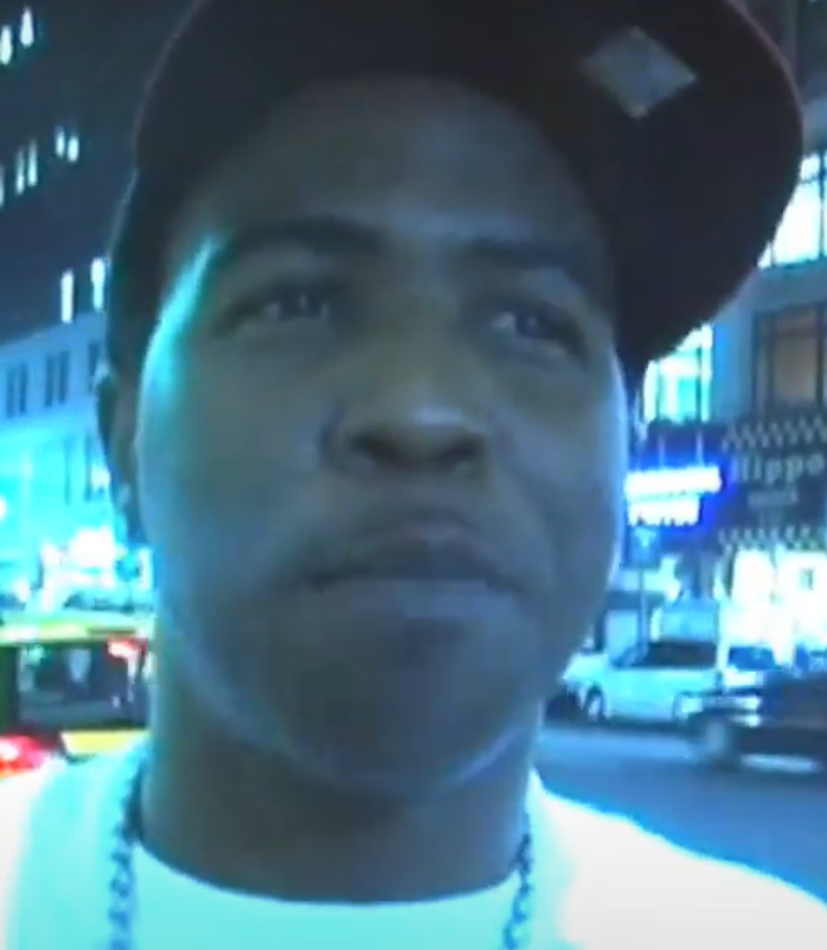
- Brisco in 2011

Background information
- Born: British Alexander Mitchell; June 28, 1982 (age 44); Opa-locka, Florida, U.S.
- Genre: Hip hop
- Occupations: Rapper, songwriter
- Years active: 2001–present
- Labels: Poe Boy; Cash Money; Universal Motown; Republic

British Alexander Mitchell (born June 28, 1982), better known by his stage name Brisco, is an American rapper from Opa-locka, Florida. In 2006, he guest performed on fellow South Florida native DJ Khaled's debut album—Listennn... the Album—and signed to Birdman's Cash Money Records, an imprint of Universal Motown Records in a joint venture with Poe Boy Entertainment. His debut studio album, Street Medicine was scheduled for release in 2010; however, it was ultimately released nine years later as Black Roses under solely Poe Boy due to lack of commercial response.

== Early life ==
Mitchell grew up in Miami, Florida. His mother died when he was 9, and four years later, at age 13, his brother was killed in a car accident; he then migrated to Opa-Locka, Florida. At age 14, the troubled teen's cousin introduced him to his best friend, E-Class, the founder of Poe Boy Entertainment.

== Music career ==
Mitchell met Poe Boy Entertainment founder E-Class in 1997. E-Class encouraged him to express his life hardships through rap.

In 2006, Mitchell did guest performances on tracks from DJ Khaled's Listennn... the Album ("The Future of Dade") and Rick Ross's Port of Miami ("I'm a G", also with Lil Wayne). Lil Wayne signed Brisco to Cash Money Records in November that year. Brisco began recording an album for Poe Boy and Cash Money, Street Medicine, in 2007, which resulted in popular records such as "I'm Into Dat" and "Opa-locka". He also made his big debut with Cash Money on Lil' Wayne's mixtape Da Drought 3 on a song called New Cash Money.

Mitchell continued doing many guest appearances in 2007 and 2008, such as for albums We the Best by DJ Khaled ("I'm From Dade County"), Tha Carter III by Lil Wayne ("La La"), and Mail on Sunday by Flo Rida ("Money Right"). He also released his own singles, "In the Hood" (featuring Lil Wayne Produced by COONEY and KaneBeatz) and "Just Know Dat" (remix featuring Flo Rida and Lil Wayne Produced by COONEY and co-produced by CP HOLLYWOOD) and appeared in Billy Blue's "Get Like Me". In late 2008, Mitchell released a mixtape with DJ Bigga Rankin, From Dade to Duval, part of Rankin's Real Nigga Radio series. In the summer of 2009, Mitchell showed his diversity with a charismatic feature on the song entitled "Catch 22" which was written and performed for Miami's well known ghost writer Dray Skky. For Brisco's highly anticipated debut LP, Street Medicine, he plans to create lyrics based on his real-life experiences and to "mix club tracks, sex tracks and religious tracks". The lead single from the album is entitled "On the Wall" featuring Lil Wayne. Street Medicine had a planned release date of December 2010 but ultimately never released.

Mitchell released a diss record aimed at rappers Gucci Mane, OJ Da Juiceman and Waka Flocka Flame called "Waka Blacka". This song surfaced shortly after Waka got shot on a Tuesday in Atlanta. He states that he only released this after Gucci Mane dissed him on his song "Heavy", referencing an incident. The entertainers have since put their differences behind them.

In February 2011, it was revealed that he would take part in a new Hiphop/Pro Wrestling collaboration, the Urban Wrestling Federation with taping of the first bout "First Blood" taking place in June 2011.

In October 2012, Brisco released a single titled "Chocolate Dream", which was produced by Fatboi and featured Ricco Barrino on the assist.

In 2020, he has appeared on the third season of Love & Hip Hop: Miami.

== Discography ==
=== Albums ===
==== Studio albums ====
Year	Title	Peak chart positions		
Year	Title	U.S.	U.S. R&B	U.S. Rap
2019	Black Roses: Release: December 2019; Label: Poe Boy Entertainment			

==== Mixtapes ====
Year	Title
2007	The New Ca$h Money (Hosted by: DJ Kronik)
2007	The Product 2 (Hosted by: DJ Dephtone)
2008	The Underworld Rise (Hosted by: DJ Drama)
2008	From Dade to Duval (Hosted by: DJ Bigga Rankin)
2008	Black Bags & Yellow Tape (Hosted by: DJ Obscene)
2009	The Wait Is Over (Hosted by: DJ Kronik and DJ Obscene)
2009	From Dade to Duval Vol. 2 (Hosted by: DJ Bigga Rankin)
2009	Revenge
2010	OG Kush (4–20 Edition)
2010	Brisco and It's Nique Vol. 1 (Hosted by: DJ ON POINT)
2010	Brisco and It's Nique Vol. 2 (Hosted by: JGREEN MONEYTALKZ)
2011	Jump Street
2012	Fruits of My Labor
2012	OG KUSH PT3: 7 GRAMS
2013	OG Kush 4 (G-12 Edition)
2014	OG Kush 5 (On Papers)
2015	UndaRated
2016	OG Kush 6 (Reefa)

=== Singles ===
==== As lead artist ====
List of singles, with selected chart positions, showing year released and album name
Title	Year	Peak chart positions	Album
Title	Year	US R&B	Album
"In the Hood" (featuring Lil Wayne)	2007	—	Street Medicine
"Just Know Dat"^{[A]} (featuring Flo Rida and Lil Wayne)	2008	113	Street Medicine
"Black Shades" (featuring Ball Greezy and Billy Blue)	2009	—	From the 305
"On the Wall" (featuring Lil Wayne)	2010	89	Street Medicine
"—" denotes a recording that did not chart.

==== As featured performer ====
List of singles, showing year released and album name
Title	Year	Album
"I'm Just It" (Ball Greezy featuring Brisco)	2008	Non-album single
"Drop That" (Mista Mac featuring Flo Rida, Brisco and Ball Greezy)	2009	From the 305
"Hands High" (DJ Noodles featuring Jermaine Dupri, Ace Hood, Brisco, 2 Pistols and Tom G)	2010	Non-album single

=== Other charted songs ===
List of songs, with selected chart positions, showing year released and album name
Title	Year	Peak chart positions	Album
Title	Year	US R&B	Album
"La La"^{[B]} (Lil Wayne featuring Brisco and Busta Rhymes)	2008	106	Tha Carter III

=== Guest appearances ===
List of non-single guest appearances, with other performing artists, showing year released and album name
Title	Year	Other performer(s)	Album
"The Future of Dade"	2006	DJ Khaled, Dirty Red, Dela, Lunch Money, Co, Hennessy, P.M.	Listennn... the Album
"I'm a G"	2006	Rick Ross, Lil Wayne	Port of Miami
"Bitch I'm from Dade County"	2007	DJ Khaled, Trick Daddy, Trina, Rick Ross, Flo Rida, C-Ride, Dre	We the Best
"Grind"	2007	Birdman, Lil Wayne	5 * Stunna
"New Cash Money"	2007	Lil Wayne	Da Drought 3
"Reppin' My City"	2008	Rick Ross, Triple C's	Trilla
"Money Right"	2008	Flo Rida, Rick Ross	Mail on Sunday
"La La"	2008	Lil Wayne, Busta Rhymes	Tha Carter III
"Final Warning"	2008	DJ Khaled, Rock City, Bun B, Blood Raw, Ace Hood, Bali, Lil Scrappy, Shawty Lo	We Global
"Blood Money"	2008	DJ Khaled, Rick Ross, Ace Hood, Birdman	We Global
"Can't See Y'all"	2008	Ace Hood	Gutta
"Birthday" (Remix)	2008	Flo Rida, Rick Ross	The Flo Rida Cash Cartel
"Ha"	2009	Flo Rida, 4 Mill	R.O.O.T.S.
"Yayo"	2009	Flo Rida, Billy Blue, Ball Greezy, Rick Ross, Red Eyezz, Bred, Pitbull, Ace Hood	R.O.O.T.S.
"Balla"	2009	Flo Rida, Billy Blue	R.O.O.T.S.
"Nobody"	2009	Flo Rida, Ball Greezy	R.O.O.T.S.
"Picture Me"	2010	Messy Marv, Berner, Cozmo	Blow: Blocks and Boat Docks
"Niggas So Cut Throat"	2011	Project Pat, Juicy J	Loud Pack
"Heart of the City"	2012	Ghostwridah, Billy Blue, Nehemie	Downtown Lights
"I Don't Blame Ya"	2012	Nader RED	Redy or Not Mixtape
"On Dat"	2012	Young A.C.	Tipo815

=== Music videos ===
List of music videos, with directors, showing year released
Title	Year	Director(s)
"In the Hood" (featuring Lil Wayne)	2007	Scott Franklin
"On the Wall" (featuring Lil Wayne)	2010	Jeffrey Elmont, Daniel Herman
"I Don't Blame Ya" (featuring Brisco)	2012	Josh Eidenberg
"I Love It When They Hate" (Clint Dawg featuring Brisco)	2012	Madface

=== Notes ===
- A "Just Know Dat" did not enter the Hot R&B/Hip-Hop Songs chart, but peaked at number 13 on the Bubbling Under R&B/Hip-Hop Singles chart, which acts as a 25-song extension to the Hot R&B/Hip-Hop Songs chart.
- B "La La" did not enter the Hot R&B/Hip-Hop Songs chart, but peaked at number 6 on the Bubbling Under R&B/Hip-Hop Singles chart, which acts as a 25-song extension to the Hot R&B/Hip-Hop Songs chart.

The music video for "In the Hood" by Brisco, which features Lil' Wayne, features cameos from Rick Ross, Flo Rida, DJ Khaled, Triple C's, Cool & Dre, and Birdman all in the video.
