= Right Round =

2009 single by Flo Rida featuring Kesha

Single by Flo Rida featuring Kesha

from the album R.O.O.T.S.
- B-side: "Shone"
- Released: January 27, 2009
- Recorded: 2008
- Studio: Conway Recording Studios (Hollywood, CA); Atlantic Studios (Hollywood, CA)
- Genre: Pop rap; EDM; electropop
- Length: 3:27
- Label: Poe Boy; Atlantic
- Songwriters: Flo Rida; Dr. Luke; Kool Kojak; DJ Frank E; Philip Lawrence; Bruno Mars; Aaron Bay-Schuck; Pete Burns; Steve Coy; Wayne Hussey; Tim Lever; Mike Percy
- Producers: Dr. Luke; Kool Kojak

Flo Rida singles chronology
"Cause a Scene" (2009)	"Right Round" (2009)	"Feel It" (2009)

Kesha singles chronology
"Right Round" (2009)	"Tik Tok" (2009)

Music video
- "Right Round" on YouTube

"Right Round" is a single performed by American rapper Flo Rida featuring guest vocals from American singer Kesha. It was released as the lead single from his second studio album, R.O.O.T.S. (2009), and also serves as Kesha's debut single. It was released to radio on January 27, 2009, and was digitally released on February 10 by Poe Boy Entertainment and Atlantic Records. The song heavily interpolates the chorus of the 1984 Dead or Alive song "You Spin Me Round (Like a Record)" in its hook. According to one of the song's writers, the chorus refers to a stripper. Kesha contributed guest vocals to the song, but was uncredited in the United States and Canada during its run atop the charts.

"Right Round" was a commercial success, reaching the top ten of the music charts in nineteen countries worldwide. "Right Round" became Flo Rida's second number-one song on the Billboard Hot 100 (staying at number-one for six consecutive weeks), and broke the record for first-week sales (636,000 downloads) when it was released to digital retailers; eventually, this record was broken by Adele's "Hello", which sold 1.11 million copies in its first week. Outside of the United States, "Right Round" topped the charts in Australia, Canada, and the United Kingdom. The single's accompanying music video was directed by Malcolm Jones and nominated for an MTV Video Music Award. The song has been used in several movies, such as The Hangover, The Ugly Truth, Pilla Zamindar and Pitch Perfect, where the song is performed by the film's a cappella group The Treblemakers. The song is one of the best-selling singles of the digital era, with over 12 million certified downloads sold, making it Flo Rida's best selling single, and Kesha's second.

== Background and recording ==
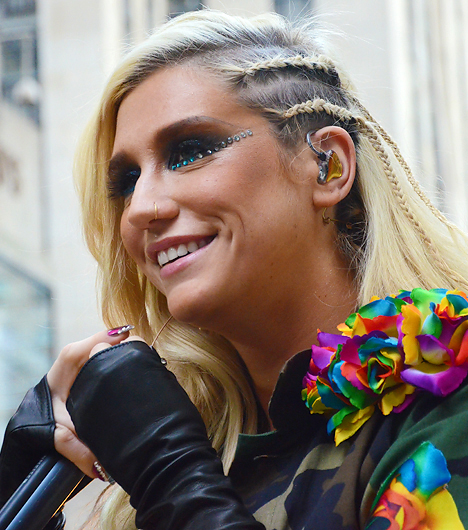
The inclusion of Kesha (pictured) was the suggestion of producer Dr. Luke, as Flo Rida wanted a female voice in the song.

"Right Round" was written by Flo Rida, Dr. Luke, Kool Kojak, DJ Frank E, Philip Lawrence, Bruno Mars, Aaron Bay-Schuck, and Dead or Alive, the band whose 1984 song "You Spin Me Round (Like a Record)" is sampled in the chorus. The track was produced by Dr. Luke and Kool Kojak and features guest vocals from American pop singer Kesha (who was not credited on the American release of the single).

Bruno Mars stated that the song was the first "big hit" he and his songwriting team, The Smeezingtons, had the chance to write: "We wrote 'Right Round' for Flo Rida. That was a sample, obviously, but we got our name in there and got some publishing. And it was a No. 1 record. That was our first taste of what could really happen with a hit we hundred-percented". Talking about the making of the track, Mars said: "It was actually a freestyle. Phil and I came up with that in two minutes. We were in the business after that! [Laughs]".

At the end of 2008, Luke was working on "Right Round" with Flo Rida and the two decided they needed a female hook. Luke pulled Kesha into the studio to record the vocals. According to Flo Rida, the song is about "a young lady, she might be in the strip club and she's got my head spinning round, [...] Or any young lady that I might see walking past me that's getting my attention. She got it going on! I'm going crazy over her."

Flo Rida explained that he listened to "You Spin Me Round (Like a Record)" and similar records growing up as a result of the varying music genres his seven sisters listened to. Ultimately, his A&R Aaron Bay-Schuck came up with the idea to sample "You Spin Me Round (Like A Record)" in a song. Bay-Schuck told HitQuarters that he had been listening to a shuffle beat produced by DJ Frank E on a CD of potential beats and had kept hearing in his head the melody of the Dead or Alive song over the top of it. Co-A&R Mike Caren then brought the sample to the attention of Flo Rida.

As R.O.O.T.S. was Flo Rida's second studio album, he wanted to show listeners musical growth by "broaden[ing] my horizons," which was why he decided to record the song. After Luke produced the sample, the song was recorded. In the same night the song was written Aaron Bay-Schuck, Bruno Mars and Philip Lawrance decided to go to the studio and make the initial recording. It was recorded primarily at Conway Studios in Los Angeles, California, with additional recording at nearby Atlantic Studios.

== Composition ==
"Right Round"
A 20-second sample of "Right Round," where Flo Rida and Kesha sing the Dead or Alive-sampling hook and Flo Rida begins the first verse.

Musically, "Right Round" uses the recurring pop rap themes of Flo Rida's music; specifically, similarities were noted between the song and "Low" (2007), with Allmusic reviewer David Jeffries calling "Right Round" its "heir apparent". The song is "swaggering" and "bass-heavy", according to Leah Greenblatt of Entertainment Weekly. The lyrics discuss being in a strip club with friends and tossing money at a woman performing a striptease. Additionally, the chorus line "You spin my head right round, right round / When you go down, when you go down, down" can be interpreted as a reference to fellatio. Bruno Mars, co-writer of the song, confirmed in an interview with Entertainment Weekly that the song's chorus was referring to oral sex. Philip Lawrence, also co-writer, confessed the song was "almost something we had accidentally written in the car one night just hanging out." It was him, Bruno Mars, and Aaron Bay-Schuck. Bay-Schuck was playing to Bruno and Philip some tracks and wanted to come up with something big for Flo Rida, and they were just throwing out 1980s ideas. The song's sexual themes have been compared to those of "If U Seek Amy" (2009) by Britney Spears.

== Critical reception ==
Reviews for "Right Round" were mostly negative. A reviewer for The New York Times called the song "[b]ionic and empty". In a review of R.O.O.T.S., Ken Capobianco of The Boston Globe stated, "His music is pure ear candy that must make Britney [Spears] envious, yet he wants to come off as a thug." He continued that it is unlikely that "Right Round" would have gone over well in Brooklyn in the '80s, calling it "as hard as Jell-O." Alex Fletcher of Digital Spy stated in his review of the song, "It's pretty difficult to ruin a pop classic, but Flo Rida gives it a pretty good stab here." He added that "Right Round" is "[f]illed with more misogyny than a 1970s working men's club", and called it "an unpleasant affair that's only saved from the trashcan by its sample." Fletcher concluded, "The fuzzy synths, electro beats and infectious chorus hook sung by Kesha are almost enough to fool the casual listener into enjoying themselves. But sadly it's never too long before Flo Rida turns up again to spoil things." Simon Vozick-Levinson of Entertainment Weekly called the song "a horrendous rap remake of Dead or Alive's 'You Spin Me Round (Like a Record).'" Noting that the song was, at the time, the number-one single on the Billboard Hot 100, he added, "What does all this say about us as a society? Mainly that we really, really enjoy cheesetastic '80s hair-pop hits in whatever form we can get 'em, I guess."

There were also a few positive reviews. One such review came from Fraser McAlpine of BBC, who opened, "It's one of the fundamental laws of pop, anything which tips a nod to 'You Spin Me Round (Like A Record)' by Dead Or Alive is going to be worth a listen." He continued, "Even though this is just a song written from the perspective of a randy man watching a pole-dancer and bragging about how much money he has [...] in a manner which would make Akon blush, there's just something kind of cute about the whole thing." McAlpine attributed this to the song's "Tigger-beat", explaining, "How can anything too sordid be going on when everyone is bouncing around like they're on spacehoppers?" Bill Lamb of About.com commented, "You will hear echoes of another pop classic, but the new song stands on its own feet." However, he noted that while pop music fans would appreciate it, hip hop listeners would likely dismiss it, and he added that "[i]t's not groundbreaking by any means".

== Commercial performance ==
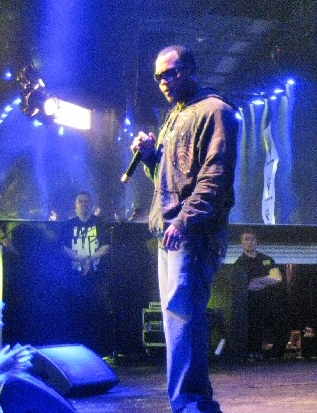
Flo Rida performing "Right Round" at the Circus Club in Finland on July 9, 2009.

In the United States, "Right Round" debuted at number 69 on the Billboard Hot 100 based solely on airplay. The next week, it rose sixteen positions to chart at number fifty-eight. In its third chart week, issue dated February 19, 2009, it jumped fifty-seven positions to the top spot, becoming Flo Rida's second number-one hit after 2007's "Low". That week, it also debuted at the top of the Hot Digital Songs chart with sales of 636,000 downloads, breaking the record of first-week sales established only the week before by Eminem, Dr. Dre and 50 Cent's "Crack a Bottle" (418,000). Eventually, Adele's "Hello" outsold the record in 2015, selling 1.11 million copies in its first week. It remained atop the Hot 100 for six consecutive weeks. "Right Round" also topped the Pop 100 in the United States, and peaked at the third position on the Hot Rap Tracks chart, and appeared on the Hot 100's year-end and decade-end charts at positions six and eighty, respectively. By March 12, 2009, the song was certified gold and platinum by the Recording Industry Association of America, and by March 31, achieved double-platinum status. To date, it has since been certified 8× platinum by the RIAA for selling 8 million units in the United States. "Right Round" made its Canadian debut at the seventy-fifth position, moved to the forty-seventh position in its second week, and peaked at the top of the charts – where it spent nine non-consecutive weeks – its third week. At the end of 2009, it was ranked the number-three song on the Canadian Hot 100. As of March 2014, it has sold 5,572,000 digital downloads in the USA.

The song debuted at the top of the Australian ARIA Singles Chart and maintained its position for seven non-consecutive weeks. It has been certified twice-platinum by the Australian Recording Industry Association. It was the number-five song of the year and appeared on the decade-end chart at number eighteen. In New Zealand, "Right Round" debuted at number nine and moved to number five in its second week. It remained in the top five for four weeks before reaching a peak of number two, where it remained for four consecutive weeks. The Recording Industry Association of New Zealand has certified the song platinum, and it was ranked as the seventh most popular song of 2009.

"Right Round" also performed well in Europe, peaking at the second position on the European Hot 100 Singles chart and at number sixteen on the chart's year-end list. In the United Kingdom, the single debuted at number one on the UK Singles Chart on March 8, 2009 – for the week ending date March 14, 2009 – becoming both Flo Rida and Kesha's first chart-topping song in Britain. It then dropped to number two in its second charting week. It remained in the top ten for six weeks. As of January 2012, the song had sold 505,434 copies in Britain. In Ireland, it debuted at number four on the Irish Singles Chart, and remained in the top five for four weeks. In its fifth week, it topped the Irish Singles Chart and remained at the top position for three consecutive weeks. Elsewhere in Europe, the song reached the top ten in Austria (where it was certified gold by the International Federation of the Phonographic Industry), Belgium (number one in Wallonia, number two in Flanders), Denmark, the Netherlands, Finland, France, Norway, Spain, Sweden, Switzerland and Germany.

== Music video ==
The song's accompanying music video was shot in Miami, Florida and directed by Malcolm Jones. Kesha was asked to appear in the video, but declined; in an interview with Esquire magazine, she said, "They [Flo Rida's team] wanted me in the video, and I said, 'Nah, I want to make my own name for myself.'" The video begins with Flo Rida standing on a revolving circular platform, while his name appears in gold on a screen behind him. A young woman then joins him on the platform, with shots alternating between the two together and each individually. During the first verse, the screen behind him alternates between images of a rotating globe and locations such as Tokyo, Paris, London, and New York City. Shortly after, the silhouettes of three women appear behind Flo Rida while the clip is intercut with shots of a rotating disco ball and several women on a circular bed. Several women are then seen dancing on or around cars while Flo Rida stands in front of them. A waitress comes in to serve them an unidentified beverage. As the video ends, Flo Rida is seen once again on the circular platform while the screen behind him shows a red background with a gold Poe Boy Entertainment sticker. The video was nominated for Best Hip-Hop Video at the 2009 MTV Video Music Awards, but lost to Eminem's "We Made You" (2009).

== Track listings and formats ==
- EU CD 1 / US / AUS CD single
1. "Right Round" – 3:27
- GER CD single
1. "Right Round" – 3:27
2. "Low" (Travis Barker Remix) – 4:16
- EU CD 2 / US maxi CD single
1. "Right Round" (Benny Benassi Remix) – 6:31
2. "Right Round" (Benny Benassi Remix Edit) – 3:22
3. "Right Round" (Mark Brown Remix) – 6:51
4. "Right Round" (Mark Brown Remix Dub) – 6:51
- US 12" vinyl
1. "Right Round" – 3:27
2. "Right Round" (Instrumental) – 3:23
3. "Shone" (Album Version) – 4:13
4. "Shone" (Instrumental) – 4:13
- EU CD 3
1. "Right Round" – 3:27
2. "Right Round" (Instrumental) – 3:23
3. "In the Ayer" (Jason Nevins Remix) – 6:47
4. "Right Round" (Music Video) – 3:26

== Credits and personnel ==
- Dr. Luke – producer, drums, keyboards, programming
- Koool Kojak – producer, drums, keyboards, programming
- Emily Wright – recorder, vocal editor
- Sam Holland – recorder
- Aniela Gottwald – assistant vocal editor
- Chex Lunix – assistant vocal editor
- Juan Pablo Negrete Ortiz – additional recorder
- Serban Ghenea – mixer
- John Hanes – mixing engineer
- Tim Roberts – assistant mixing engineer
- Flo Rida – vocals
- Bruno Mars - songwriter
- Kesha – vocals
- Philip Lawrence – additional vocals
- Gary "G" Silver – production coordinator
- Vanessa Silberman – production coordinator

== Charts ==
=== Weekly charts ===
Weekly chart performance for "Right Round"
Chart (2009–2010)	Peak position
Australia (ARIA)	1
Austria (Ö3 Austria Top 40)	2
Belgium (Ultratop 50 Flanders)	2
Belgium (Ultratop 50 Wallonia)	1
Bulgaria (BAMP)	1
Canada Hot 100 (Billboard)	1
Canada CHR/Top 40 (Billboard)	1
Canada Hot AC (Billboard)	2
CIS Airplay (TopHit)	6
Croatia (HRT)	3
Czech Republic Airplay (ČNS IFPI)	6
Denmark (Tracklisten)	3
Europe (Billboard Euro Digital Songs)	1
Europe (European Hot 100 Singles)	2
Finland (Suomen virallinen lista)	3
France (SNEP)	2
Germany (GfK)	4
Greece Digital Song Sales (Billboard)	9
Hungary (Dance Top 40)	3
Hungary (Rádiós Top 40)	5
Ireland (IRMA)	1
Israel International Airplay (Media Forest)	6
Italian Airplay (EarOne)	47
Italy (FIMI)	18
Japan Hot 100 (Billboard)	8
Mexico Ingles Airplay (Billboard)	4
Netherlands (Dutch Top 40)	3
Netherlands (Single Top 100)	4
New Zealand (Recorded Music NZ)	2
Norway (VG-lista)	2
Russia Airplay (TopHit)	7
Scottish Singles Sales (Official Charts)	1
Slovakia Airplay (ČNS IFPI)	3
South Korea Foreign (Gaon)	67
Spain (Promusicae)	7
Sweden (Sverigetopplistan)	2
Switzerland (Schweizer Hitparade)	2
UK Singles (Official Charts)	1
Ukraine Airplay (TopHit)	12
US Billboard Hot 100	1
US Adult Pop Airplay (Billboard)	31
US Dance Airplay (Billboard)	19
US Hot Latin Songs (Billboard)	31
US Hot R&B/Hip-Hop Songs (Billboard)	63
US Hot Rap Songs (Billboard)	3
US Pop Airplay (Billboard)	1
US Rhythmic Airplay (Billboard)	3

=== Year-end charts ===
Year-end chart performance for "Right Round"
Chart (2009)	Position
Australia (ARIA)	5
Australia Hip-Hop/R&B (ARIA)	2
Austria (Ö3 Austria Top 40)	7
Belgium (Ultratop 50 Flanders)	23
Belgium (Ultratop 50 Wallonia)	24
Brazil (Crowley)	50
Canada Hot 100 (Billboard)	3
CIS (TopHit)	58
Croatia International Airplay (HRT)	52
Denmark (Tracklisten)	18
European Hot 100 Singles (Billboard)	16
Finland (Suomen virallinen lista)	7
France (SNEP)	31
Germany (GfK)	21
Hungary (Dance Top 100)	20
Hungary (Rádiós Top 100)	8
Ireland (IRMA)	12
Italy (FIMI)	68
Japan Hot 100 (Billboard)	85
Japan Adult Contemporary (Billboard)	26
Japan Radio Songs (Billboard)	44
Netherlands (Dutch Top 40)	12
Netherlands (Single Top 100)	47
New Zealand (Recorded Music NZ)	7
Norway (VG-lista)	14
Russia Airplay (TopHit)	44
Sweden (Sverigetopplistan)	9
Switzerland (Schweizer Hitparade)	6
UK Singles (Official Charts)	22
Ukraine Airplay (TopHit)	116
US Billboard Hot 100	6
US Hot Rap Songs (Billboard)	19
US Pop Airplay (Billboard)	7
US Radio Songs (Billboard)	17
US Rhythmic Airplay (Billboard)	15

Chart (2010)	Position
Australia Hip-Hop/R&B (ARIA)	44
South Korea Foreign (Gaon)	115

=== Decade-end charts ===
Decade-end chart performance for "Right Round"
Chart (2000–2009)	Position
Australia (ARIA)	18
US Billboard Hot 100	80

== Certifications and sales ==
Certifications and sales
Region	Certification	Certified units/sales
Australia (ARIA)	3× Platinum	210,000^{^}
Austria (IFPI Austria)	Gold	15,000^{*}
Canada (Music Canada)	8× Platinum	640,000^{‡}
Denmark (IFPI Danmark)	Platinum	30,000^{^}
Finland (Musiikkituottajat)	Gold	5,552
Germany (BVMI)	Platinum	300,000^{^}
Italy (FIMI)	Platinum	100,000^{‡}
Japan (RIAJ) Digital single	Gold	100,000^{*}
New Zealand (RMNZ)	3× Platinum	90,000^{‡}
South Korea	—	115,295
Spain (Promusicae)	Gold	30,000^{‡}
Switzerland (IFPI Switzerland)	Platinum	30,000^{^}
United Kingdom (BPI)	2× Platinum	1,200,000^{‡}
United States (RIAA)	8× Platinum	8,000,000^{‡}
United States (RIAA) Mastertone	Gold	500,000^{*}
Summaries
Worldwide	—	12,000,000
^{*} Sales figures based on certification alone.^{^} Shipments figures based on certification alone.^{‡} Sales+streaming figures based on certification alone.

== See also ==
- List of best-selling singles worldwide
- List of best-selling singles in the United States
- List of number-one singles in Australia in 2009
- List of Belgian Wallonia Ultratop 40 number-one hits of 2009
- List of Hot 100 number-one singles of 2009 (Canada)
- List of number-one singles of 2009 (Ireland)
- List of number-one singles from the 2000s (UK)
- List of Hot 100 number-one singles of 2009 (U.S.)
- List of Mainstream Top 40 number-one hits of 2009 (U.S.)
