= Poe Boy Entertainment =

American record label

- Parent company: Warner Music Group
- Founded: 1999; 26 years ago
- Founder: E-Class
- Distributor(s): Atlantic Records Group (United States); WEA International Inc. (international)
- Genre: Various
- Country of origin: United States
- Location: Miami, Florida
- Official website: PoeBoyMusicGroup.com

Poe Boy Music Group (formerly Poe Boy Entertainment) is an American record label, founded in 1999 by Elric "E-Class" Prince. That same year the label signed local Miami rappers, Cognito, The P.O.D, Brisco and R&B singer Rodney "The Gingerbread Man" who set the label in motion. Poe Boy Music Group signed acts such as Flo Rida, J Rand, Kulture Shock, Billy Blue, Jacki-O, Brisco, Rick Ross, and Brianna Perry.

The label has a close affiliation with fellow Miami based label Slip-n-Slide Records.

== Artists ==
=== Current roster ===
- Flo Rida (Poe Boy/IMG/Strongarm/Atlantic)
- J Rand (Formerly knowns as J Randall) (Poe Boy/Geffen)
- Brisco (Cash Money/Universal Motown)
- Rodney Kohn (IMG/Strongarm)
- Brianna Perry (Poe Boy/Atlantic Records)
- Billy Blue (Poe Boy/Konvict/Mosley/Interscope)
- Kulture Shock (consisting of City, Jase and Stephie Lecor) (Poe Boy/Hiram Group)
- DJ Smokey Bear (Poe Boy/Hiram Group)
- YT Triz
- King leonidas (Poe Boy/ Hiram Group)

=== Producers ===
- JRock
- Flyntstones

=== Comedians ===
- Benji Brown

== Past releases ==
The P.O.D – The Power Of Dollars

- Released: October 1, 2001
- Chart positions:
- RIAA certification:

Cognito – Tru Cognizance

- Released: November 5, 2002
- Chart positions:
- RIAA certification:
- Singles: "Addicted To Ya", "Big Bank"

Jacki-O – Poe Little Rich Girl

- Released: October 26, 2004
- Chart positions: No. 95 Billboard
- RIAA certification:
- Singles: "Nookie (Real Good)", "Fine", "Sugar Walls", "Break You Off"

Rick Ross – Trilla

- Released: March 11, 2008
- Chart positions: No. 1 Billboard
- RIAA certification: Gold
- U.S. sales: 700,000+
- Singles: "Speedin'", "The Boss", "Here I Am", "This Is the Life"

Flo Rida – Mail on Sunday

- Released: March 18, 2008
- Chart positions: No. 4 Billboard
- RIAA certification:
- U.S. sales: 350,000+
- Singles: "Low", "Elevator", "In the Ayer"

Billy Blue – Rated Hood - The Street Album (Mixtape)

- Released: 2008
- Chart positions:
- RIAA certification:
- Singles: "Ball Like A Dog", "Get Like Me"

Flo Rida – R.O.O.T.S.

- Released: March 31, 2009
- Chart Positions: No. 8 Billboard
- RIAA certification: Platinum
- Singles: "Right Round", "Shone", "Sugar"

Rick Ross – Deeper Than Rap

- Released: April 21, 2009
- Chart Positions: No. 1 Billboard
- RIAA certification:
- Singles: "Magnificent", "Usual Suspects"

Flo Rida - Only One Flo (Part 1)

- Released: November 30, 2010
- Chart Positions: No. 107 Billboard
- RIAA certification:
- Singles: "Club Can't Handle Me", "Turn Around (5, 4, 3, 2, 1)", "Who Dat Girl"

Flo Rida - Wild Ones

- Released: July 3, 2012
- Chart Positions: No. 14 Billboard
- RIAA certification:
- Singles: "Good Feeling", "Wild Ones", "Whistle" "I Cry"

=== Upcoming releases ===
- Brisco – Street Medicine
- Billy Blue – The Story Of My Life
- Brianna Perry – Girl Talk
