= Flo Rida =

American rapper and singer (born 1979)

- Flo Rida in 2026

Background information
- Born: Tramar Lacel Dillard; September 16, 1979 (age 47); Miami Gardens, Florida, U.S.
- Genres: Hip-hop; pop
- Occupations: Rapper; singer; songwriter
- Years active: 2000–present
- Labels: Atlantic; Poe Boy; International Music Group; Artist Partner Group; Strong Arm

Tramar Lacel Dillard (born September 16, 1979), known professionally as Flo Rida (/floʊ ˈraɪdə/ floh RY-də), is an American rapper and singer. Dillard began rapping professionally in the early 2000s and gained recognition with his five mixtapes between 2003 and 2007. His 2007 debut and breakout single "Low" was number 1 for ten weeks in the United States and broke the record for digital download sales at the time of its release.

Flo Rida's debut album, 2008's Mail on Sunday, reached number 4 in the U.S. The album was succeeded by R.O.O.T.S., the next year. His subsequent albums, 2010's Only One Flo (Part 1) and 2012's Wild Ones, also charted on the U.S. Billboard 200 chart. Flo Rida has sold over 80 million records worldwide, making him one of the best-selling music artists. His catalog includes the international hit singles "Right Round", "Club Can't Handle Me", "Good Feeling", "Wild Ones", "Whistle", "I Cry", "G.D.F.R.", and "My House".

Together with Italian singer Senhit he represented San Marino in the Eurovision Song Contest 2021 with the song "Adrenalina", finishing in 22nd place.

== Early life ==
Flo Rida was born as Tramar Lacel Dillard on September 16, 1979, in the Carol City neighborhood of Miami Gardens, Florida. He has seven sisters, the youngest of whom is his twin. Some of his sisters sang in a local gospel group. His brother-in-law was a hype man for local rap group 2 Live Crew, and while in ninth grade, Flo Rida joined an amateur rap group called the GroundHoggz. The GroundHoggz had been a three-man group, with members who lived in the same apartment complex as Flo Rida. They started recording at underground studios in Carver Ranches. The GroundHoggz, in this four-man incarnation, remained together for eight years. Early on in his career one of his sisters, Julia, died due to bronchitis. Her death greatly affected Flo Rida and his career, with him telling MTV, "I was very close to her, and I told myself that I was going to do this for my sister."After graduating from high school in 1998, he studied international business management at the University of Nevada, Las Vegas for two months and attended Barry University for two months.

== Career ==
=== 2000–2007: Career beginnings and mixtapes ===
While he was performing, rapper Fresh Kid Ice took notice and asked him to be his hype man, and shortly after he took him for a show in Hawaii. Flo Rida made his debut guest appearance with the songs in legs up, liqueur talking and let me see it. With The GroundHoggz, they were featured guests on Fresh Kid Ice's album Freaky Chinese (2004).

Flo Rida's work with Fresh Kid Ice attracted the attention of DeVante Swing, a member of the band Jodeci. Between 2003 and 2007 he began releasing his mixtapes first flo, R.I.D.A, second flo, florida cash cartel and mr birthday man. He returned to Florida to continue pursuing his music career after receiving a phone call from a representative of the independent label Poe Boy Entertainment.

Flo Rida was associated with Lil Jon & the East Side Boyz, as featuring artist in 2000. In year 2004, he began affiliating himself with other Southern hip-hop artists, such as Rick Ross, Trina, T-Pain, and Trick Daddy. A promotional single entitled "Birthday", featuring Rick Ross, was his first significant release. He made his second guest appearance with the song "Bitch I'm From Dade County" on DJ Khaled's album We the Best (2007), which also features Trick Daddy, Trina, Rick Ross, Brisco, C-Ride, and Dre.

=== 2007–2008: Mail on Sunday ===
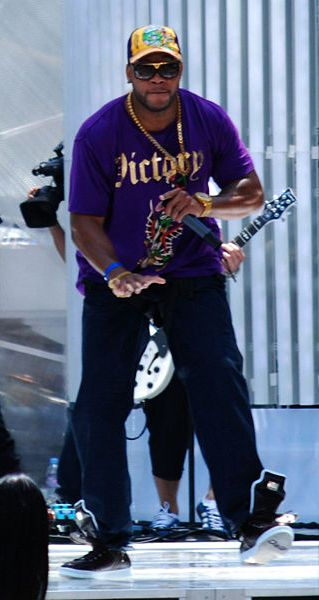
Flo Rida rehearsing for the 2008 MuchMusic Video Awards in Toronto

Flo Rida's debut album, Mail on Sunday, was released on March 18, 2008. The first single was "Low", featuring T-Pain, which was also included in the soundtrack to the movie Step Up 2: The Streets. "Low" reached No. 1 on the Billboard Hot 100 chart. "Elevator", featuring Timbaland, "In the Ayer" featuring will.i.am, and "Roll" featuring Sean Kingston followed, and both charted on the Hot 100 and other charts.

In addition to T-Pain, there were many featured guests throughout Mail on Sunday. Timbaland, who produced the second single "Elevator", is also featured on the track. Rick Ross, and Trey Songz made appearances as well. Lil Wayne appeared on the track "American Superstar", while Sean Kingston appeared on the J. R. Rotem-produced "Roll", which was co-written by Compton rapper Spitfiya. Various other guests include Birdman, Brisco, and Yung Joc.

"Money Right", featuring Brisco and Rick Ross, was scheduled to be the fourth single, but this was canceled due to the upcoming release of Flo Rida's second studio album, R.O.O.T.S. His second collaboration with T-Pain, "I Bet", as well as his collaboration with Trina, named "Bout It", both did not make the final tracklist, but were recorded.

After the success of Mail on Sunday, Flo Rida made guest performances on other R&B, rap, and pop singles, including "Move Shake Drop" by DJ Laz, "We Break the Dawn" by Michelle Williams, the remix of "4 Minutes" by Madonna, "Running Back" by Australian R&B singer Jessica Mauboy, "Feel It" by DJ Felli Fel, and the remix of "Speedin'" by Rick Ross. During the summer of 2008, he did live performances on the Fox dance competition program So You Think You Can Dance in the US and 2008 MuchMusic Video Awards in Canada. He appeared on the albums We Global by DJ Khaled, Gutta by Ace Hood, and The Fame by Lady Gaga.

=== 2009–2010: R.O.O.T.S. ===
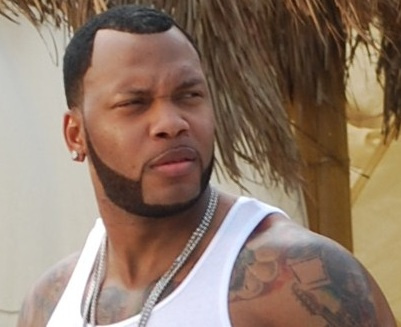
Flo Rida on the set of the music video for "Sugar"

Flo Rida began recording his second album, R.O.O.T.S., 9 months after Mail On Sunday. The album was released on March 31, 2009. The first single, "Right Round" featuring Kesha, was released for airplay in January 2009. "Right Round" jumped from number 58 to the top spot in one week in late February. The song broke a record for the most digital one week sales in the US, with 636,000, beating the previous record he had set himself with "Low". "Right Round" sampled "You Spin Me Round (Like a Record)", a 1985 hit by British band Dead or Alive. "Right Round" also became Flo Rida's first chart-topping song in the United Kingdom. The second official single was "Sugar", which featured R&B singer Wynter Gordon. The song reached No. 5 on the Billboard Hot 100. "Jump", featuring singer Nelly Furtado, was the third official single and was released on July 27, 2009, in the United Kingdom, and July 28, 2009, worldwide. "Be on You", featuring singer Ne-Yo, was the album's fourth official single, released on October 6, 2009. Both songs charted in the top 100 in various countries. "Available", featuring Akon, was going to be released on iTunes but was cancelled. A music video was, however, shot in mid-2009. R.O.O.T.S. debuted at number 8 on the Billboard 200 chart, selling 55,000 copies in its first week. As of August 2009, the album has sold 223,000 copies in the United States, and 536,000 worldwide. By the end of 2009, the album sold 247,000 copies in the US, becoming the eighth best-selling rap album of 2009.

Flo Rida made guest performances on "Feel It" by DJ Felli Fel, "Starstruck" by Lady Gaga, and "Feel It" by Three 6 Mafia. "Bad Boys", the second song by winner of season 5 of the British TV singing competition The X Factor Alexandra Burke that featured Flo Rida, debuted at the top of the UK Singles Chart in October 2009, becoming both Burke's and Flo Rida's second chart-topping song in Britain.

=== 2010–2011: Only One Flo (Part 1) ===
Flo Rida's third album Only One Flo (Part 1) was released on November 24, 2010. In March 2010, Flo Rida announced on Twitter that the album would be titled The Only One. Billboard reported that The Only One was to be a double album. A promo single, titled "Zoosk Girl", which features T-Pain, was released on the internet; though the song is not featured on the album, the single does have its own music video. On June 28, 2010, Flo Rida released the song "Club Can't Handle Me" featuring David Guetta, which was stated to be the official first single for the album. The song was also featured in the Step Up 3D soundtrack. On November 2, 2010, "Come with Me" was released as the first promo single for the album, along with "Puzzle", produced, and featuring by Electrixx, which is not featured on the album. On November 16, 2010, "Turn Around (5, 4, 3, 2, 1)" was released as the second official promo single for the album via the iTunes Store. It debuted on the Australian Singles Chart at number 34 on November 29, 2010. After the release of the album in the UK, "Who Dat Girl" started to receive a strong number of downloads, thus causing it to debut at number 136 on the UK Singles Chart and chart at a current peak of number 31 on the UK R&B Chart. "Why You Up In Here" was released as the fourth single, and third promo single, on May 11, 2011. The song features Ludacris, Gucci Mane, and Git Fresh.

Flo Rida also made guest appearances on "iYiYi", a song by Australian teen singer Cody Simpson, and on the song "Out My Video" by Bulgarian singer LiLana. Flo Rida collaborated with UK girl group The Saturdays, recording a new version of their single, "Higher".

In December 2010, Flo Rida created his own label, International Music Group, inspired by Nicki Minaj's signing with Lil Wayne's. He has signed an 18-year-old rapper, Brianna and Git Fresh to International.

=== 2011–2013: Wild Ones ===
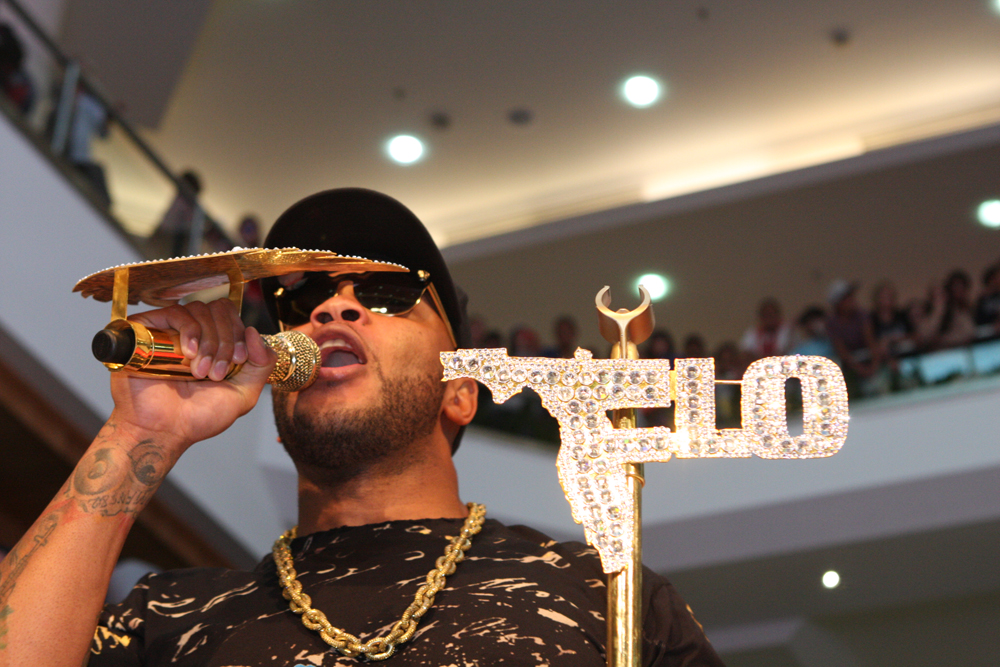
Flo Rida performing in 2012

Flo Rida's fourth album, Wild Ones (originally titled Only One Rida (Part 2)) was released in July 2012. Its debut single was "Good Feeling", released on August 29, 2011. The song samples Etta James' 1962 song, "Something's Got a Hold on Me". Following the death of Etta James on January 20, 2012, Flo Rida dedicated the song in her memory. The song peaked at No. 3 in the United States, and topped the charts in Austria, Germany, and the United Kingdom. In the latter country, it became Flo Rida's fourth chart-topper on the UK Singles Chart including collaborations with British artists and David Guetta. It reached the top five in nine other countries. The next two singles from the album were the title track, "Wild Ones", released in December 2011, and "Whistle", released in April 2012. "Wild Ones" reached No. 1 in various countries, and hit No. 5 in the US, while "Whistle" reached No. 1 in 20 countries, including the United States.

Flo Rida also collaborated with Justice Crew on their song "Dance with Me (Justice Crew song)" back in March 2011. It reached the top fifty in Australia.

On April 1, 2012, Flo Rida appeared at WWE's WrestleMania XXVIII in a segment with Heath Slater, Curt Hawkins, and Tyler Reks, in which Slater called Flo Rida "Florida" and the rapper shoved him into a wall. Later that night, he performed "Wild Ones" and "Good Feeling" before Dwayne "The Rock" Johnson came out for his match against John Cena. An exclusive Australian EP entitled Good Feeling was released in Australia on April 6, which contains six of his biggest hits and two remixes. It debuted at No. 21 on the Australian ARIA Albums Chart On May 22, 2012, Flo Rida performed and closed the show at the first Q102 Springle Ball Concert, and the following day he performed "Goin' In" with Jennifer Lopez on the America Idol finale.

On September 13, Flo Rida performed his new single "I Cry" on America's Got Talent. On December 9, he performed "Let It Roll" and "Wild Ones" at the 2012 edition of WWE's Tribute to the Troops. In October 2012, he collaborated with Olly Murs for his song "Troublemaker". In June 2013, Flo Rida collaborated with Marc Mysterio on the song "Booty on the Floor" to benefit the families and victims of the Boston Marathon bombing via One Fund Boston.

=== 2014–present: My House, status of fifth studio album, Eurovision Song Contest, and lawsuit against Celsius ===
In January 2014, Flo Rida was featured in the song "One Night Stand" by Slovak duo TWiiNS. In November, he appeared on Nickelback's album No Fixed Address in the track "Got Me Runnin' Round". Flo Rida was also featured in Jeremih's track "Tonight Belongs to U!".

On September 29, 2014 (October 21 in the U.S), Flo Rida released the lead single from his EP My House (2015) titled "G.D.F.R." featuring Sage the Gemini. The song became his tenth top 10 hit in the United States, peaking at number 8 in the Billboard Hot 100 chart and at number 3 in the US Top 100 chart on iTunes. On June 19, 2015, Flo Rida released the second single called "I Don't Like It, I Love It" featuring Robin Thicke and Verdine White. The single reached the No. 43 spot on the Billboard Hot 100. On October 15, 2015, the title track "My House" was released as a single and became an international success, peaking at number 4 on the Billboard Hot 100 in early 2016.

Following the EP, in December 2015, Flo Rida released the single "Dirty Mind", featuring Sam Martin. On February 20, 2016, Flo Rida released "Who Did You Love", a collaboration with Arianna. On February 26, 2016, Flo Rida released a standalone single "Hello Friday" featuring Jason Derulo, that peaked at number 79 in the Billboard Hot 100 chart. On March 24, 2016, he released the promotional single "Who's with Me".

On July 29, 2016, Flo Rida released "Zillionaire", that was featured in the trailer for Masterminds. Flo Rida was also featured on Liz Elias' single "At Night" as well as on Pitbull's single "Greenlight", included on Pitbull's tenth album Climate Change. In early 2017, Flo Rida's track "Cake" featuring Bay Area rap duo 99 Percent went viral with the trending #CakeChallenge dance, and the song reached No. 77 on the Hot 100. On November 17, 2017, Flo Rida released another single "Hola" featuring Colombian singer/songwriter Maluma. On March 2, 2018, Flo Rida released a new single titled "Dancer" followed shortly afterwards by the Just Dance 2019 track "Sweet Sensation".

On multiple occasions, Flo Rida has addressed his progress on a fifth studio album. In 2017, he said it was 70 percent finished, while in 2020 he put it at 88% and alluded to a 2021 release date.

Flo Rida was featured on the song "Adrenalina" by Italian singer Senhit who represented San Marino in the Eurovision Song Contest 2021 in Rotterdam, Netherlands. Two days before the second semi-final of the contest, it was confirmed that Flo Rida would be joining Senhit on stage. San Marino, represented by Senhit, finished 22nd overall out of 26 countries in the final of the contest.

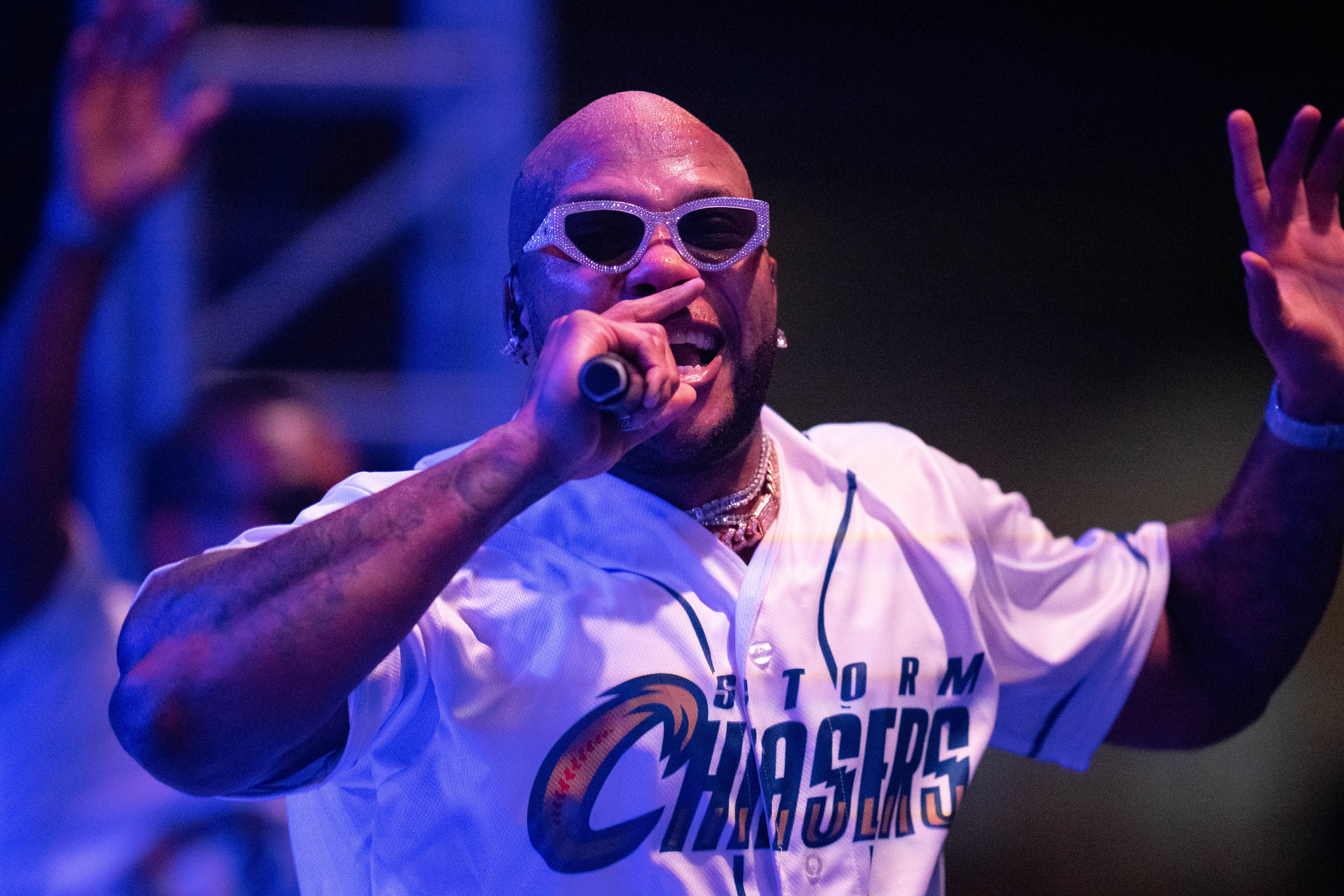
Flo Rida performing in 2022

In 2022, Flo Rida released country rap singles "High Heels" featuring Walker Hayes and "No Bad Days" featuring Jimmie Allen.

On January 18, 2023, Flo Rida was awarded $82.6 million by a Florida jury in his lawsuit against Celsius, the maker of energy drinks with whom Flo Rida had an endorsement deal, serving as a brand ambassador from 2014 to 2018. He and his production company, Strong Arm Productions, claimed that Celsius breached their contract and attempted to hide money.

== Artistry ==
Flo Rida's music encompasses hip-hop, pop, and dance. His style has been described as dance-pop, dance-rap, and pop rap.

== Discography ==
Studio albums

- Mail on Sunday (2008)
- R.O.O.T.S. (2009)
- Only One Flo (Part 1) (2010)
- Wild Ones (2012)

== Awards and nominations ==
Year	Type	Award	Result
2008	American Music Awards	Breakthrough Performer	Nominated
2008	American Music Awards	Favorite Male Hip-Hop Artist	Nominated
2008	BET Awards	Best New Artist	Nominated
2008	BET Awards	Best Collaboration ("Low" with T-Pain)	Nominated
2008	BET Hip Hop Awards	Ringtone of the Year ("Low" with T-Pain)	Nominated
2008	BET Hip Hop Awards	Rookie of the Year	Nominated
2008	BET Hip Hop Awards	Best Hip-Hop Collabo ("Low" with T-Pain)	Nominated
2008	MuchMusic Video Awards	Best International Video ("Low" with T-Pain)	Nominated
2008	MuchMusic Video Awards	People's Choice Favorite International Video ("Low" with T-Pain)	Nominated
2008	MTV Video Music Awards	Best Hip-Hop Video ("Low" with T-Pain)	Nominated
2008	MTV Video Music Awards	Best Male Video ("Low" with T-Pain)	Nominated
2008	Ozone Awards	Breakthrough Artist	Nominated
2008	Ozone Awards	Club Banger of the Year ("Low" with T-Pain)	Nominated
2008	Teen Choice Awards	Choice Breakout Artist	Nominated
2008	Teen Choice Awards	Choice Rap Artist	Nominated
2008	Teen Choice Awards	Choice Hook-Up ("Low" with T-Pain)	Won
2009	ARIA Music Awards	Breakthrough Artist Single ("Running Back" with Jessica Mauboy)	Nominated
2009	ARIA Music Awards	Highest Selling Single ("Running Back" with Jessica Mauboy)	Won
2009	APRA Awards	Urban Work of the Year ("Running Back" with Jessica Mauboy)	Won
2009	Grammy Awards	Best Rap/Sung Collaboration ("Low" with T-Pain)	Nominated
2009	MTV Australia Awards	Best Video ("Low" with T-Pain)	Nominated
2009	MTV Australia Awards	Best Collaboration ("Running Back" with Jessica Mauboy)	Nominated
2009	MTV Video Music Awards	Best Hip-Hop Video ("Right Round")	Nominated
2009	NT Indigenous Music Awards	Single Release of the Year ("Running Back" with Jessica Mauboy)	Won
2009	People's Choice Awards	Favorite Hip-Hop Song ("Low" with T-Pain)	Won
2009	Teen Choice Awards	Best Hip-Hop Rap Track ("Right Round")	Nominated
2010	APRA Awards	Urban Work of the Year ("Running Back" with Jessica Mauboy)	Nominated
2010	Grammy Awards	Best Rap Album (R.O.O.T.S.)	Nominated
2010	Grammy Awards	Album of the Year (The Fame as a featured artist)	Nominated
2010	Latin Billboard Music Awards	Crossover Artist Of The Year	Nominated
2010	Latin Billboard Music Awards	Crossover Artist of the Year, Solo	Nominated
2010	People's Choice Awards	Hip-Hop Artist of the Year	Nominated
2012	Premios 40 Principales	Mejor Artista Internacional en Lengua No Española	Nominated
2012	Premios 40 Principales	Mejor Álbum Internacional en Lengua No Española	Nominated
2012	Teen Choice Awards	Single by Male Artist ("Good Feeling")	Nominated
2012	Teen Choice Awards	R&B/Hip-Hop Artist	Nominated
2012	Teen Choice Awards	R&B/Hip-Hop Song ("Wild Ones" with Sia)	Nominated
2012	Teen Choice Awards	Music Star Male	Nominated
2012	Billboard Music Award	Top Rap Song ("Good Feeling")	Nominated
2012	International Dance Music Award	Best R & B/Urban Dance Track ("Good Feeling")	Nominated
2012	International Dance Music Award	Best Rap/Hip Hop Dance Track ("Good Feeling")	Nominated
2012	MTV Europe Music Awards	Best Male	Nominated
2012	MTV Europe Music Awards	Best World Stage Performance	Nominated
2012	American Music Awards	Favorite Pop/Rock Male Artist	Nominated
2013	Peoples Choice Awards	Favorite Hip-Hop Artist	Nominated
2013	Grammy Awards	Best Rap/Sung Collaboration ("Wild Ones with Sia")	Nominated
2013	NRJ Music Awards	International Male Artist of the Year	Nominated
2013	International Dance Music Awards	Best Rap/Hip-Hop Dance Track ("Wild Ones")	Won
2013	Billboard Latin Music Awards	Crossover Artist of the Year	Nominated
2013	2013 Billboard Music Awards	Top 100 Artist	Nominated
2013	2013 Billboard Music Awards	Top Male Artist	Nominated
2013	2013 Billboard Music Awards	Top Digital Songs Artist	Nominated
2013	2013 Billboard Music Awards	Top Rap Artist	Nominated
2013	2013 Billboard Music Awards	Top Rap Song ("Wild Ones")	Nominated
2013	2013 Billboard Music Awards	Top Rap Song ("Whistle")	Nominated

Awards and achievements
Preceded by Senhit with "Freaky!" (contest cancelled)	San Marino in the Eurovision Song Contest; 2021 (with Senhit)	Succeeded by Achille Lauro with "Stripper"
