= Breyan Isaac =

- Born: Breyan Stanley Isaac; May 24, 1980 (age 46); Boston, Massachusetts, U.S.
- Genres: Hip hop; R&B; pop; electronic; funk; soul; rock
- Occupations: Record producer; singer; songwriter; pianist
- Labels: BMG; APG; SAL&CO
- Website: www.breyanisaac.com

Breyan Stanley Isaac (born May 24, 1980) is an American record producer, songwriter and singer based in Daytona Beach, Florida. He has produced or co-written songs for numerous music industry acts, including Cardi B, David Guetta, Flo Rida, Pitbull, Wiz Khalifa, Nicki Minaj, Charlie Puth, G-Eazy, Waka Flocka Flame, and Lecrae, among others.

Isaac has won five consecutive awards for songwriting from BMI from 2013 to 2017, and was ranked the 76th best songwriter and producer in the world in 2015 by SS100. He won Best Reggae Album at the 2018 Grammy Awards for his work on Damian Marley's Stony Hill.

He has publishing deals with Mike Caren's Artist Publishing Group and BMG and is managed by SAL&CO. He also runs a production company with Dre Marshall.

== Early life ==
Isaac was born in the Roxbury neighborhood of Boston, Massachusetts. As a child, he relocated to Fort Lauderdale, Florida after his father found a better job there. In his youth, Isaac was a worship leader in church.

== Career ==
Isaac began his career in earnest after moving to Daytona Beach, Florida. He was invited by a friend to do some sessions with Flo Rida and would continue to work with him thereafter. That work eventually led Isaac to his first placement, "Good Feeling." That song, which peaked at No. 3 on the Billboard Hot 100, would later be released on Flo Rida's 2012 album, Wild Ones. Isaac co-wrote 4 songs on that album, including "Good Feeling" and "Whistle" the latter of which went to No. 1 on the Billboard Hot 100 chart.

The following year, he co-wrote "Timber" by Pitbull featuring Kesha. That song would also top the Hot 100 chart and go multi-platinum in several countries. In 2015, he co-wrote Charlie Puth's "One Call Away" for which he would go on to win a BMI Pop Award (his fifth in as many years).

In 2016 and 2017, he worked on a variety of movie soundtrack songs, including Lecrae's "River of Jordan" from The Shack, Nick Jonas and Nicki Minaj's "Bom Bidi Bom" from Fifty Shades Darker, and Lil Uzi Vert, Quavo, and Travis Scott's "Go Off" from The Fate of the Furious. In 2017, he worked on Damian Marley's "Medication," the lead single off of his album, Stony Hill. The album would go on to win the Grammy Award for Best Reggae Album in 2018. He co-wrote Romania's entry for the Eurovision Song Contest 2020, which was later cancelled due to the COVID-19 pandemic.

== Discography ==
Selected songs with production and songwriting credits
| Song name | Year | Primary artist(s) | Album | Role | Notes |
|---|---|---|---|---|---|
| "Whistle" | 2012 | Flo Rida | Wild Ones | Co-writer, Vocals | US No. 1 |
| "Good Feeling" | 2012 | Flo Rida | Wild Ones | Co-writer, Vocals | US No. 3 |
| "Let It Roll" | 2012 | Flo Rida | Wild Ones | Co-writer, Vocals | UK No. 17 |
| "Sweet Spot" | 2012 | Flo Rida (feat. Jennifer Lopez) | Wild Ones | Co-writer, Vocals | ARIA No. 25 |
| "Let It Roll (Pt. 2)" | 2012 | Flo Rida (feat. Lil Wayne) | Wild Ones | Co-writer | |
| "Change Your Life" | 2012 | Far East Movement (feat. Flo Rida and Sidney Samson) | Dirty Bass | Co-writer, Vocals | ARIA No. 60 |
| "Troublemaker" | 2012 | Olly Murs (feat. Flo Rida) | Right Place Right Time | Co-writer, Vocals | UK No. 1 |
| "Get Low" | 2012 | Waka Flocka (feat. Nicki Minaj, Tyga, and Flo Rida) | Triple F Life: Friends, Fans & Family | Co-writer, co-producer | US No. 72 |
| "Tchu Tchu Tcha" | 2012 | Pitbull (feat. Enrique Iglesias) | Global Warming | Co-writer | |
| "Can't Believe It" | 2013 | Flo Rida (feat. Pitbull) | Non-album single | Co-writer, Vocals | ARIA No. 7 |
| "How I Feel" | 2013 | Flo Rida | Non-album single | Co-writer, Vocals | US No. 96 |
| "Dade County Dip" | 2013 | DJ Tight (feat. Cupid) | Non-album single | Co-writer, co-producer | |
| "Shisha" | 2013 | Massari (feat. French Montana | Non-album single | Co-writer | CAN No. 37 |
| "Hey Porsche" | 2013 | Nelly | MO | Co-writer | US No. 42 |
| "Timber" | 2013 | Pitbull (feat. Kesha) | Meltdown | Co-writer | US No. 1 |
| "Kama Sutra" | 2014 | Jason Derulo (feat. Kid Ink) | Talk Dirty | Co-writer | |
| "Bubblegum" | 2014 | Jason Derulo (feat. Tyga) | Talk Dirty | Co-writer | ARIA No. 38 |
| "Bed of Lies" | 2014 | Nicki Minaj (feat. Skylar Grey) | The Pinkprint | Co-writer, co-producer | US No. 62 |
| "What I Did for Love" | 2014 | David Guetta (feat. Emeli Sandé) | Listen | Co-writer, Vocals | UK No. 6 |
| "Goodbye Friend" | 2014 | David Guetta (feat. The Script) | Listen | Co-writer, Vocals | |
| "Beast" | 2014 | Mia Martina (feat. Waka Flocka) | Mia Martina | Co-writer, Vocals | CAN No. 39 |
| "Celebrate" | 2014 | Pitbull | Globalization | Co-writer | |
| "Cola Song" | 2014 | Inna (feat. J Balvin) | Inna | Co-writer | ROM No. 34 |
| "Too Sexy" | 2015 | Inna | Inna | Co-writer | |
| "Birds Fly" | 2015 | Hardwell (feat. Mr Probz) | United We Are | Co-writer | |
| "I Don't Like It, I Love It" | 2015 | Flo Rida (feat. Robin Thicke and Verdine White) | My House | Co-writer | US No. 43 |
| "That's What I Like" | 2015 | Flo Rida (feat. Fitz) | My House | Co-writer, Vocals | |
| "Wobble" | 2015 | Flo Rida | My House | Co-writer, Vocals | |
| "Go Hard or Go Home" | 2015 | Wiz Khalifa and Iggy Azalea | Furious 7: Original Motion Picture Soundtrack | Co-writer | US No. 86 |
| "One Call Away" | 2015 | Charlie Puth | Nine Track Mind | Co-writer | US No. 12 |
| "Losing My Mind" | 2016 | Charlie Puth | Nine Track Mind | Co-writer, co-producer | |
| "Suffer" | 2016 | Charlie Puth | Nine Track Mind | Co-writer, co-producer | |
| "Liar" | 2016 | Britney Spears | Glory | Co-writer, Vocals | |
| "Zillionaire" | 2016 | Flo Rida | Non-album single | Co-writer, Vocals | |
| "Hello Friday" | 2016 | Flo Rida (feat. Jason Derulo) | Non-album single | Co-writer, Vocals | US No. 79 |
| "Gettin' Old" | 2016 | 6lack | Free 6lack | Co-writer, co-producer | |
| "Gimme Gimme" | 2017 | Inna | Nirvana | Co-writer | ROM No. 16 |
| "Milk and Honey" | 2017 | G Girls | Non-album single | Co-writer | ROM No. 67 |
| "Sounds Good To Me" | 2017 | Nelly | Non-album single | Co-writer | |
| "River of Jordan" | 2017 | Lecrae | The Shack Soundtrack | Co-writer, Vocals | |
| "Bom Bidi Bom" | 2017 | Nick Jonas and Nicki Minaj | Fifty Shades Darker: Original Motion Picture Soundtrack | Co-writer, co-producer, Vocals | |
| "Go Off" | 2017 | Lil Uzi Vert, Quavo, and Travis Scott | The Fate of the Furious: The Album | Co-producer, vocals | |
| "Obsession" | 2017 | Vice (feat. Jon Bellion) | Non-album single | Co-writer | |
| "Sober" | 2017 | G-Eazy (feat. Charlie Puth) | The Beautiful & Damned | Co-writer, co-producer | US RB/HH No. 49 |
| "Want You Back" | 2017 | Citizen Four | Non-album single | Co-writer | |
| "Medication" | 2017 | Damian Marley (feat. Stephen Marley) | Stony Hill | Co-writer, co-producer | |
