= I Cry (Flo Rida song) =

2012 single by Flo Rida

Single by Flo Rida

from the album Wild Ones
- Released: September 18, 2012
- Recorded: 2012
- Length: 3:42
- Label: Poe Boy; Atlantic
- Songwriters: Alex Schwartz; Joe Khajadourian; Brenda Russell; Jeff Hull; Maarten Hoogstraten; Paul Bäumer; Calvin Harris; Pierre-Antoine Melki; Raphaël Judrin; Scott Cutler; Tramar Dillard
- Producers: soFLY & Nius; The Futuristics; Calvin Harris

Flo Rida singles chronology
"Goin' In" (2012)	"I Cry" (2012)	"Troublemaker" (2012)

Audio sample
- "I Cry": file; help

Music video
- "I Cry" on YouTube

"I Cry" is a song by American hip hop artist Flo Rida. The track was first released on September 18, 2012, as the fourth single from his fourth studio album, Wild Ones. The song samples Bingo Players' "Cry (Just a Little)", which in turn interpolates lyrics from the song "Piano in the Dark" by Brenda Russell. "I Cry" was produced by the French production duo soFLY & Nius and the Futuristics, and it was written by Flo Rida, The Futuristics, Scott Cutler, Calvin Harris, Jeffrey Hull, Brenda Russell, and soFLY & Nius.

"I Cry" received mixed reviews from music critics, who criticized its lyrical content and production, and stated that it would have been better with a collaboration with Sia, who previously collaborated with Flo Rida on the song, "Wild Ones". However, some critics were positive towards its catchiness and club-nature. The song received commercial success upon its release, peaking inside the top ten in many countries including Australia, Austria, Canada, Denmark, Finland, France, Germany, New Zealand, Norway, Switzerland, the United Kingdom, and the United States. A music video was released for the single on YouTube. This song is the second track on Now 45.

== Critical reception ==
"I Cry" received generally mixed reviews from most music critics. Andy Gill from The Independent said that this track and "In My Mind (Part 2)" are "galloping grooves." Chris Payne from Billboard was favorable, saying, "After repeat listens 'I Cry' might sound a good deal like the rest of Wild Ones, but played in a club at the right time, it's got enough building beats and poppy climaxes to deliver." AbsolutePunk said that "I Cry" was a "decent dance cut, using a sample from the Bingo Players for the hook."

However, Melissa Maerz from Entertainment Weekly said, "Most bizarre is 'I Cry', which speeds up Brenda Russell's 1988 smooth-jazz cheesefest 'Piano in the Dark' until it has all the emotional heft of an LMFAO track. You couldn't program a robot to cry to it." Glenn Gamboa from Newsday said the sample of "Piano in the Dark" was "off" and wanted it to "speed up a bit." Robert Copsey from Digital Spy gave it a rather scathing review, only awarding it one star out of five. He stated, 'I Cry' is just sheer laziness [...] Flo waxes the usual lyrical nonsense about champagne buckets and his tattoo of Jimi Hendrix." Copsey also thought it would have been better as a collaboration with "Wild Ones" guest vocalist Sia. He stated, "We've said it once and we'll say it again: Bring back Sia!"

== Chart performance ==
"I Cry" was a commercial success upon its release, performing particularly well in European countries. The song first charted in Norway, debuting at number 8 on the Norwegian Singles Chart and rising to number 1 the following week, where it lasted for three weeks in total. In Denmark, the song debuted at number 9 for the chart week ending September 7, 2012, and reached a peak of number 8 on September 16. "I Cry" also performed strongly in Ireland and the United Kingdom: it reached number 16 in Ireland on September 13, 2012, and reached a peak of number 3 on the UK Singles Chart for the chart week dated September 30, 2012.

In Australia, "I Cry" first appeared and peaked on the Australian Singles Chart at number 3 on September 16, 2012, remaining at that position for two weeks in total. The song peaked at number ten in New Zealand, debuting at number 17 on September 17, 2012, and rising to its peak position the following week.

== Music video ==
A music video for the song was released on September 30, 2012, directed by Marc Klasfeld. The video includes footage of Flo Rida visiting his home neighborhood in Carol City, Florida to tell his story of his struggle to fame and fortune while crying seeing the town's wealth. The music video premiered on BET's 106 & Park on October 11, 2012, when Flo Rida visited the show.

== Track listing ==
- Digital download
1. "I Cry" – 3:42
- CD single
1. "I Cry"
2. "Whistle" (Jakob Lido remix)

== Charts and certifications ==
=== Weekly charts ===
Weekly chart performance
Chart (2012–2013)	Peak position
Australia (ARIA)	3
Austria (Ö3 Austria Top 40)	6
Belgium (Ultratop 50 Flanders)	8
Belgium (Ultratop 50 Wallonia)	19
Brazil (Billboard Brasil Hot 100)	47
Brazil Hot Pop Songs	12
Canada Hot 100 (Billboard)	9
Czech Republic Airplay (ČNS IFPI)	7
Denmark (Tracklisten)	8
Finland (Suomen virallinen lista)	1
France (SNEP)	9
Germany (GfK)	10
Hungary (Rádiós Top 40)	10
Hungary (Single Top 40)	5
Ireland (IRMA)	12
Israel International Airplay (Media Forest)	5
Italy (FIMI)	48
Italian Airplay (EarOne)	74
Japan Hot 100 (Billboard)	85
Lebanon (Lebanese Top 20)	15
Luxembourg Digital Songs (Billboard)	8
Netherlands (Dutch Top 40)	34
Netherlands (Single Top 100)	40
New Zealand (Recorded Music NZ)	4
Norway (VG-lista)	1
Romania (Romanian Top 100)	8
Russia Airplay (TopHit)	7
Slovakia Airplay (ČNS IFPI)	6
Spain (Promusicae)	32
Sweden (Sverigetopplistan)	17
Switzerland (Schweizer Hitparade)	9
UK Radio Airplay (Nielsen Soundscan)	20
UK Singles (Official Charts)	3 (Note: The UK Singles Chart did not factor data from the streaming chart until July 2014. As its peak position was on the week of October 6, 2012, it was for a sales-only chart.)
UK Streaming (Official Charts)	5
UK TV Airplay (Nielsen Soundscan)	1
UK Hip Hop/R&B (Official Charts)	1
US Billboard Hot 100	6
US Adult Pop Airplay (Billboard)	37
US Dance Club Songs (Billboard)	42
US Dance Airplay (Billboard)	7
US Hot Rap Songs (Billboard)	1
US Latin Airplay (Billboard)	27
US Pop Airplay (Billboard)	4
US Rhythmic Airplay (Billboard)	2
Venezuela (Record Report)	66

=== Year-end charts ===
Year-end chart performance
Chart (2012)	Position
Australia (ARIA)	29
Belgium (Ultratop 50 Flanders)	84
Belgium Dance (Ultratop Flanders)	50
Belgium Dance (Ultratop Wallonia)	42
France (SNEP)	87
Germany (Media Control AG)	76
Hungary (Rádiós Top 40)	85
Sweden (Sverigetopplistan)	91
UK Singles (Official Charts Company)	54
Chart (2013)	Position
Canada (Canadian Hot 100)	63
Russia Airplay (TopHit)	85
US Billboard Hot 100	64
US Dance/Mix Show Airplay (Billboard)	36
US Mainstream Top 40 (Billboard)	41
US Rhythmic (Billboard)	26

=== Certifications ===
Certifications for "I Cry"
Region	Certification	Certified units/sales
Australia (ARIA)	3× Platinum	210,000^{^}
Canada (Music Canada)	2× Platinum	160,000^{*}
Germany (BVMI)	Gold	150,000^{^}
Mexico (AMPROFON)	Gold	30,000^{*}
New Zealand (RMNZ)	Platinum	15,000^{*}
Switzerland (IFPI Switzerland)	Platinum	30,000^{^}
United Kingdom (BPI)	Platinum	600,000^{‡}
United States (RIAA)	2× Platinum	2,000,000^{*}
Streaming
Denmark (IFPI Danmark)	2× Platinum	3,600,000^{†}
^{*} Sales figures based on certification alone.^{^} Shipments figures based on certification alone.^{‡} Sales+streaming figures based on certification alone.^{†} Streaming-only figures based on certification alone.

== Radio and release history ==
Street and radio dates
Country	Date	Format	Label
United States	September 18, 2012	Contemporary hit radio	Poe Boy Entertainment; Atlantic Records
United States	September 18, 2012	Rhythmic contemporary radio	Poe Boy Entertainment; Atlantic Records
Netherlands	October 21, 2012	Digital download	Poe Boy Entertainment; Atlantic Records
Germany	November 2, 2012	CD single	Poe Boy Entertainment; Atlantic Records
