= Good Feeling (EP) =

EP by Flo Rida
- Released: April 6, 2012
- Label: Sony Music Australia

Flo Rida chronology
Only One Flo (Part 1) (2010)	Good Feeling (2012)	Wild Ones (2012)

Flo Rida EP chronology
Hits Mix (2009)	Good Feeling (2012)	My House (2015)

Good Feeling is an EP by American rapper Flo Rida. It was released exclusively in Australia on April 6, 2012, to promote his tour there and features some of his biggest hits.

== Track listing ==
iTunes EP and physical edition

1. "Good Feeling"
2. "Wild Ones" (featuring Sia)
3. "Club Can't Handle Me (featuring David Guetta)
4. "Turn Around (5, 4, 3, 2, 1)"
5. "Who Dat Girl" (featuring Akon)
6. "Low" (featuring T-Pain)
7. "Good Feeling" (Carl Tricks remix)
8. "Good Feeling" (Jaywalker remix)

== Charts ==
Chart (2012)	Peak position
Australian Albums (ARIA)	12
New Zealand Albums (Recorded Music NZ)	5
