= Wild Ones (Flo Rida album) =

Studio album by Flo Rida
- Released: July 3, 2012
- Recorded: 2011–2012
- Genres: Pop rap; dance
- Length: 34:46
- Labels: Poe Boy; Atlantic
- Producers: Axwell; Cirkut; David Glass; DJ Frank E; Dr. Luke; Earl & E; Feenixpawl; The Futuristics; GoonRock; Ivan Gough; Rico Love; Pierre Medor; Soundz; The Monarch; The Runners; The Rockstars; soFly & Nius

Flo Rida chronology
Good Feeling (2012)	Wild Ones (2012)	My House (2015)

Singles from Wild Ones
- 1. "Good Feeling" Released: August 29, 2011; 2. "Wild Ones" Released: December 19, 2011; 3. "Whistle" Released: April 24, 2012; 4. "I Cry" Released: September 18, 2012; 5. "Sweet Spot" Released: March 13, 2013; 6. "Let It Roll" Released: March 22, 2013

Wild Ones is the fourth studio album by American rapper Flo Rida. It was released on July 3, 2012 through Poe Boy Entertainment and Atlantic Records. The album was produced by numerous artists, including Dr. Luke, GoonRock, DJ Frank E, The Futuristics, Feenixpawl, Axwell, Cirkut, and Rico Love, among others. The pop-rap and dance record features guest appearances from Sia, Georgi Kay, Jennifer Lopez, and Redfoo of LMFAO. Deluxe editions featured further guest appearances from Lil Wayne, David Guetta, and Nicky Romero, among others.

Six singles were released from the album. The first four, "Good Feeling", "Wild Ones" (featuring Sia), "Whistle", and "I Cry", all charted within the top 10 of the Billboard Hot 100. The highest-charting was "Whistle", which topped the chart, while the other three singles peaked at number 3, 5, and 6 respectively. "Let It Roll" and "Sweet Spot" (the latter featuring Jennifer Lopez) were released as the fifth and sixth singles respectively, although they fared less successful, both not charting on the Billboard Hot 100. Additionally, "Hey Jasmin" was released as a promotional single, although it did not appear on the main track list.

Upon its release, the album received mostly mixed reviews from music critics. As for commercial success, the album peaked at number 14 on the Billboard 200 and topped the Top Dance Albums chart in the United States. The album also charted within the top 10 on charts in the United Kingdom, Australia, New Zealand, Switzerland, Austria, and Ireland. The album was promoted with an EP entitled Good Feeling (named after the song of the same name), alongside appearances on WWE's WrestleMania XXVII, the season finale to American Idol, and America's Got Talent.

== Singles ==
On August 21, 2011, Flo Rida released the album's lead single, titled "Good Feeling", that samples Etta James' song "Something's Got a Hold on Me". Produced by Dr. Luke and Cirkut, the song did inspire "Levels" performed by Avicii, which also contains the Etta James sample. The song was very successful all across the world, peaking at number 3 on the US Billboard Hot 100 and also it became certified 3× platinum for shipping around two million copies in the US alone.

The album's title track was released as the album's second single on December 19, 2011, in which it features Australian singer-songwriter Sia as a vocalist. The song has sold 3,000,000 copies domestically and over 6,000,000 copies globally. The album's third single "Whistle" produced by DJ Frank E, was first played on April 16, 2012, on The Kyle and Jackie O Show on Sydney radio station 2Day FM. The single reached a peak at number one on the US Billboard Hot 100, which it became very successful around the world.

The album's fourth single, "I Cry", which was released on September 18, 2012, was inspired by "Cry (Just a Little)" performed by Bingo Players, which samples "Piano in the Dark" performed by Brenda Russell. The single reached the top ten in Canada, France, the UK and the US. A remix of Sweet Spot featuring Jennifer Lopez was released March 13, 2013. The album's sixth single "Let It Roll" was released March 22, 2013. The single reached the top 20 in the UK.

=== Promotional singles ===
Both of the promotional singles in which were released before the album's release, "Hey Jasmin" was released on June 6, 2012, with an accompanying music video. Before being released as a full-fledged single, "Let it Roll" was released digitally on June 19, 2012.

== Reception ==
=== Commercial performance ===
The album debuted at number 14 on the US Billboard 200 chart, selling 31,000 copies in its first week. To date, the album has sold 311,000 copies in the United States.

=== Critical response ===
Professional ratings
Aggregate scores
Source	Rating
Metacritic	54/100
Review scores
Source	Rating
Allmusic	3.5/5 stars
Entertainment Weekly	C−
The Independent	3/5 stars
Los Angeles Times	1.5/5 stars
Rolling Stone	2/5 stars

Upon its release, Wild Ones received mixed reviews from music critics. At Metacritic, which assigns an average rating out of 100 to reviews from mainstream critics, the album received an average score of 54, based on ten reviews, indicating "mixed or average reviews". Although he perceived the album's creative scope to be limited, David Jeffries of Allmusic called Wild Ones "gimmicky, lightweight, and best taken in small chunks, but get a glitter-friendly crowd together and it gets the party started, succeeding at its one and only goal". He also observed the album's material to be largely "hot, infectious fluff", but felt that the album "would be dragged down by any tacked-on sense of purpose, and thinking of Flo Rida as equal parts thrill seeker and hitmaker is easy". However, Rolling Stone's Jody Rosen felt the album's production to be too inconsistent, observing that the album's "inhumanly supersized... dance beats" were either "genius" or "insipid", also writing that Flo Rida "[is] content to surrender center-stage on his producers". Complex called the album cover art the sixth worst cover of 2012.

The title track received a Grammy Award for Best Rap/Sung Performance nomination for Flo Rida and Sia.

== Track listing ==
Wild Ones track listing
No.	Title	Writer(s)	Producer(s)	Length
1.	"Whistle"	Tramar Dillard; David Glass; Justin Franks; Breyan Isaac; Antonio Mobley; Marcus Killian	DJ Frank E; Glass	3:45
2.	"Wild Ones" (featuring Sia)	Dillard; Raphael Judrin; Pierre-Antoine Melki; Sia Furler; Axel Hedfors; Jacob Luttrell; Marcus Cooper; Benjamin Maddahi	SoFly & Nius; Axwell; DJ Frank E^{[a]}	3:53
3.	"Let It Roll"	Dillard; Isaac; Mobley; Mike Caren; Hedfors; Earl King	SoFly & Nius; Axwell; Caren^{[b]}	3:14
4.	"Good Feeling"	Dillard; Lukasz Gottwald; Henry Walter; Isaac; Arash Pournouri; Tim Bergling; Etta James; Leroy Kirkland; Pearl Woods	Dr. Luke; Cirkut; Emily Wright^{[c]}	4:08
5.	"In My Mind, Part 2" (featuring Georgi Kay)	Dillard; Ivan Gough; Aden Forte; Josh Soon; Georgina Kingsley	Gough; Feenixpawl; Axwell^{[a]}	4:30
6.	"Sweet Spot" (featuring Jennifer Lopez)	Dillard; Judrin; Melki; Mobley; Issac; Julie Frost	soFLY & Nius; Luttrell^{[c]}; Kuk Harrell^{[c]}	3:48
7.	"Thinking of You"	Dillard; Rico Love; Pierre Medor; Earl Hood; Eric Goudy II	Love; Medor; Earl & E	3:40
8.	"I Cry"	Dillard; Alex Schwartz; Joe Khajadourian; Judrin; Melki; Brenda Russell; Scott Cutler; Jeffrey Hull	The Futuristics; soFLY & Nius; Paul Bäumer^{[b]}; Maarten Hoogstraten^{[b]}	3:43
9.	"Run" (featuring Redfoo of LMFAO) (bonus track)	Ahmad Ali Lewis; Stefan Kendal Gordy; Jamahl Listenbee; Jonita Daniels; Juletha Daniels; Bryan Adams; James Vallance	GoonRock	3:53

Wild Ones – iTunes Store edition
No.	Title	Writer(s)	Producer(s)	Length
10.	"Let It Roll, Part 2" (featuring Lil Wayne)	Dillard; Isaac; Mobley; Caren; Hedfors; King; Carter Jr.	soFLY & Nius; Axwell	3:31

Wild Ones – Digital reissue edition
No.	Title	Writer(s)	Producer(s)	Length
10.	"Sweet Spot 2.0" (featuring Jennifer Lopez)	Dillard; Judrin; Melki; Mobley; Issac; Julie Frost	soFLY & Nius; Luttrell^{[c]}; Kuk Harrell^{[c]}	3:11

Wild Ones – iTunes Store reissue edition
No.	Title	Writer(s)	Producer(s)	Length
10.	"Let It Roll, Part 2" (featuring Lil Wayne)	Dillard; Isaac; Mobley; Caren; Hedfors; King; Carter Jr.	soFLY & Nius; Axwell	3:31
11.	"Sweet Spot 2.0" (featuring Jennifer Lopez)	Dillard; Judrin; Melki; Mobley; Issac; Julie Frost	soFLY & Nius; Luttrell^{[c]}; Kuk Harrell^{[c]}	3:11

Wild Ones – Deluxe edition
No.	Title	Writer(s)	Producer(s)	Length
10.	"Let It Roll, Part 2" (featuring Lil Wayne)	Dillard; Isaac; Mobley; Caren; Hedfors; King; Carter Jr.	soFLY & Nius; Axwell	3:31
11.	"Whistle" (Digi Remix)	Dillard; Glass; Killian; Franks; Isaac; Mobley	DJ Frank E; Glass; Digi^{[d]}	3:32
12.	"Whistle" (Jakob Lido Remix)	Dillard; Glass; Killian; Franks; Isaac; Mobley	DJ Frank E; Glass; Lido^{[d]}	6:00

Wild Ones – Japan limited edition
No.	Title	Writer(s)	Producer(s)	Length
10.	"Louder"	Dillard; Alexander Izquierdo; Jermaine Jackson; Jordan Johnson; Sean Davidson; Stefan Johnson	The Monarch; The Runners	3:19
11.	"Let It Roll, Part 2" (featuring Lil Wayne)	Dillard; Isaac; Mobley; Caren; Hedfors; King; Carter Jr.	soFLY & Nius; Axwell	3:31
12.	"Wild One Two" (Jack Back featuring David Guetta, Nicky Romero and Sia)	Dillar; Furler; Maddahi; Luttrell; Cooper; Melki; Judrin	soFly & Nius; Axwell	5:46

Wild Ones – Japan new edition
No.	Title	Writer(s)	Producer(s)	Length
13.	"Broke It Down"	Dillard; Brian Cohen; Chris Llewellyn; Kenneth Coby; Priscilla Polet	Soundz & The Rockstars	3:39
14.	"Let It Roll" (Tofubeats remix)	Dillard; Isaac; Mobley; Caren; Hedfors; King; Carter Jr.	soFLY & Nius; Axwell	3:54
15.	"Sweet Spot" (featuring May J)	Dillard; Judrin; Melki; Mobley; Issac; Julie Frost	soFLY & Nius; Luttrell^{[c]}; Kuk Harrell^{[c]}	3:52

Wild Ones – Holiday release / United Kingdom deluxe edition
No.	Title	Writer(s)	Producer(s)	Length
10.	"Broke It Down"	Dillard; Brian Cohen; Chris Llewellyn; Kenneth Coby; Priscilla Polet	Soundz	3:39
11.	"Louder"	Dillard; Izquierdo; Jermaine Jackson; Jordan Jackson; Davidson; Johnson	The Monarch; The Runners	3:19
12.	"Sweet Spot" (Tom Swoon Remix; featuring Jennifer Lopez)	Dillar; Frost; Issac; Mobley; Judrin	soFLY & Nius; Swoon^{[d]}	5:18

Wild Ones – Digital deluxe reissue edition
No.	Title	Writer(s)	Producer(s)	Length
13.	"Sweet Spot 2.0" (featuring Jennifer Lopez)	Dillard; Judrin; Melki; Mobley; Issac; Julie Frost	soFLY & Nius; Luttrell^{[c]}; Kuk Harrell^{[c]}	3:11

Notes

- ^{^[a]} denotes additional producer
- ^{^[b]} denotes co-producer
- ^{^[c]} denotes vocal producer
- ^{^[d]} denotes remix producer
- "Let It Roll" contains elements of "Come On (Part I)" performed by Freddie King and written by Earl King.
- "I Cry" contains elements of "Piano in the Dark" performed by Brenda Russell and written by Scott Cutler, Russell and Jeff Hull.
- "Good Feeling" contains elements of "Something's Got a Hold on Me" performed by Etta James and written by Etta James, Leroy Kirkland, and Pearl Woods.
- "Run" contains elements of "Run to You" performed by Bryan Adams and written by Jim Vallance and Bryan Adams, and it also contains small elements of Party Rock Anthem and Sexy and I Know It performed by the electropop group LMFAO.
- "In My Mind, Part 2" contains elements of the Axwell mix of "In My Mind" performed by Ivan Gough and Feenixpawl featuring Georgi Kay.

== Personnel ==
Unless otherwise noted, Credits are taken from the album's Liner Notes.

- Flo Rida - Vocals (2, 4, Lead on 1, 3, 6–9, Additional on 5)
- Tyler Acord - Recording Engineer (8)
- John Armstrong - Recording Engineer (additional on 1)
- Diego Avendaño - Assistant Recording Engineer (7)
- Axwell - Drum Machine (2–3, 5), Instruments (other on 2, additional on 3, 5)
- Tim Bergling - Vocal Arrangement (4)
- Delbert Bowers - Assistant Audio Mixing (1, 3, 5–6, 8)
- Candice Boyd - Background Vocals (8)
- Nathan Burgess - Assistant Audio Mixing (7)
- Yoan "Odd Fellow" Chirescu - Guitar (2)
- Cirkut - Music Programming, Additional Instruments (4)
- DJ Frank E - Whistles, Drums, Keyboards, Synthesizers, Sound Effects (1)
- Julie Frost - Additional Vocals (6)
- Dr. Luke - Music Programming, Additional Instruments (4)
- Mike Freesh - Sound Effects Assistance, Drums, Bass played by (1)
- The Futuristics - Music Programming, Additional Instruments (8)
- Chris Galland - Assistant Audio Mixing (1–3, 5–6, 8),
- Serban Ghenea - Audio Mixing (4)
- Clint Gibbs - Assistant Recording Engineer (4)
- David Glass - Guitar, Recording Engineer (1)
- Eric Goudy II - Drum Machine (7)
- Ivan Gough - Sampled Background Vocals (5)
- Josh Gudwin - Recording Engineer (6)
- John Hanes - Recording Engineer (4)
- Nico Hartikainen - Recording Engineer (7, additional on 6)
- Earl Hood - Drum Machine (7)
- Matt Huber - Assistant Audio Mixing (7)
- Breyan Isaac - Background Vocals (3, 6–7)
- Ava James - Assistant Recording Engineer (4)
- Georgi Kay - Lead Vocals (5)
- Rob Kleiner - Recording Engineer (2)
- Jennifer Lopez - Lead Vocals (6)
- Erik Madrid - Assistant Audio Mixing (2)
- Audra Mae - Additional Vocals (9)
- Robert Marks - Audio Mixing (7)
- Manny Marroquin - Audio Mixing (1–3, 5–6, 8)
- Trent Mazur - Sound Effects Assistance, Guitar, Keyboards (1)
- Thurston McCrea - Recording Engineer (7)
- Pierre Medor - Keyboards (7)
- Antonio Mobley - Background Vocals (3, 6–7)
- Skylar Mones - Assistant Recording Engineer (4)
- Juan P. Negrete - Recording Engineer (1–3, 5–6, 8–9, assistant on 4)
- Chris "Tek" O’Ryan - Recording Engineer (6)
- Robert Orton - Audio Mixing (9)
- Ash Pournouri - Vocal Arrangement (4)
- Redfoo - Lead Vocals (9)
- Phil Seaford - Assistant Mixing Engineer (4)
- Fio "Alastor" Shkreli - Sound Effects (1)
- Emily Wright - Recording Engineer (4)

== Charts ==
=== Weekly charts ===
Chart (2012)	Peak position
Australian Albums (ARIA)	5
Austrian Albums (Ö3 Austria)	8
Belgian Albums (Ultratop Flanders)	47
Belgian Albums (Ultratop Wallonia)	51
Canadian Albums (Billboard)	1
Dutch Albums (Album Top 100)	57
French Albums (SNEP)	19
German Albums (Offizielle Top 100)	16
Hungarian Albums (MAHASZ)	27
Irish Albums (IRMA)	9
Japanese Albums (Oricon)	17
New Zealand Albums (RMNZ)	6
Norwegian Albums (VG-lista)	39
Swedish Albums (Sverigetopplistan)	31
Swiss Albums (Schweizer Hitparade)	7
UK Albums (Official Charts)	8
UK R&B Albums (Official Charts)	2
US Billboard 200	14
US Top Dance Albums (Billboard)	1
US Top Rap Albums (Billboard)	2

=== Year-end charts ===
Chart (2012)	Position
Australian Albums (ARIA)	65
Canadian Albums (Billboard)	37
UK Albums (OCC)	172
US Billboard 200	186
US Top Dance/Electronic Albums (Billboard)	8

Chart (2013)	Position
US Top Dance/Electronic Albums (Billboard)	4

Chart (2022)	Position
US Top Dance/Electronic Albums (Billboard)	11

Chart (2023)	Position
US Top Dance/Electronic Albums (Billboard)	17

Chart (2024)	Position
Belgian Albums (Ultratop Flanders)	177
US Top Dance/Electronic Albums (Billboard)	19

Chart (2025)	Position
US Top Dance Albums (Billboard)	25

== Certifications ==
Certifications for Wild Ones
Region	Certification	Certified units/sales
Australia (ARIA)	Gold	35,000^{^}
Canada (Music Canada)	Gold	40,000^{^}
Denmark (IFPI Danmark)	Platinum	20,000^{‡}
New Zealand (RMNZ)	3× Platinum	45,000^{‡}
Sweden (GLF)	Gold	20,000^{‡}
United Kingdom (BPI)	Gold	100,000^{*}
^{*} Sales figures based on certification alone.^{^} Shipments figures based on certification alone.^{‡} Sales+streaming figures based on certification alone.
