= Let It Roll (Flo Rida song) =

Single by Flo Rida

from the album Wild Ones
- B-side: "Sweet Spot"
- Released: March 22, 2013
- Recorded: 2011
- Genre: Hip house; dance-pop
- Length: 3:14
- Label: Poe Boy; Atlantic
- Songwriters: Earl King; Mike Caren; soFLY & Nius; Tramar Dillard; Axwell; Breyan Isaac; Antonio Mobley; Dwayne Carter, Jr.
- Producers: soFLY & Nius; Axwell

Flo Rida singles chronology
"Sweet Spot" (2013)	"Let It Roll" (2013)	"Can't Believe It" (2013)

"Let It Roll" is a song by American rapper Flo Rida from his fourth studio album, Wild Ones. The song was written by Earl King, Mike Caren, soFLY & Nius, Flo Rida, Axwell, Breyan Isaac, Antonio "Jovii Hendrix" Mobley and produced by soFLY & Nius and Axwell. Part two of the song features American rapper Lil Wayne and is featured on the soundtrack of the football video game FIFA 13. It was also performed on the 2012 edition of the WWE Tribute to the Troops event. Part one also appears as DLC in Dance Central 3, which was released on 2012. The song appeared on The CW TV Now promo.

The song samples a portion of Freddie King's version of the Earl King song "Come On (Let the Good Time Roll)" (1974). The chorus is derived in part from Earl King's original, which Jimi Hendrix famously covered. Hendrix is referenced in the lyrics.

== Track listing ==
Digital download
No.	Title	Length
1.	"Let It Roll"	3:14
2.	"Let It Roll, Pt. 2" (featuring Lil Wayne)	3:31

== Music video ==
A music video for the song was released on November 26, 2012 directed by Jessy Terrero.

== Charts and certifications ==
=== Weekly charts ===
Chart (2012–13)	Peak position
Australia (ARIA)	7
Austria (Ö3 Austria Top 40)	6
Belgium (Ultratip Bubbling Under Flanders)	10
Belgium (Ultratip Bubbling Under Wallonia)	3
Canada Hot 100 (Billboard)	23
Czech Republic Airplay (ČNS IFPI)	28
France (SNEP)	86
Germany (GfK)	24
Hungary (Dance Top 40)	21
Hungary (Rádiós Top 40)	15
Ireland (IRMA)	34
Israel International Airplay (Media Forest)	6
Lebanon (Lebanese Top 20)	7
Netherlands (Single Top 100)	66
New Zealand (Recorded Music NZ)	18
Poland Dance (ZPAV)	11
Slovakia Airplay (ČNS IFPI)	14
UK Singles (Official Charts)	17
UK Hip Hop/R&B (Official Charts)	6

=== Year-end charts ===
Chart (2012)	Position
Austria (Ö3 Austria Top 40)	71
Chart (2013)	Position
Hungarian Airplay Chart	83

=== Certifications ===
Region	Certification	Certified units/sales
Austria (IFPI Austria)	Gold	15,000^{*}
New Zealand (RMNZ)	Gold	7,500^{*}
^{*} Sales figures based on certification alone.

== Release history ==
Region	Date	Format	Label
Australia	March 22, 2013	Digital download (Remixes)	Poe Boy; Atlantic
