= Back Together (song) =

Single by Robin Thicke featuring Nicki Minaj
- Released: August 6, 2015
- Recorded: 2015
- Length: 3:44
- Label: Interscope • Star Trak Entertainment
- Songwriters: Ali Payami; Savan Kotecha; Max Martin; Robin Thicke; Onika Maraj
- Producers: Ali Payami; Max Martin

Robin Thicke singles chronology
| "Morning Sun" (2015) | "Back Together" (2015) | "Deep" (2016) |

Nicki Minaj singles chronology
| "All Eyes on You" (2015) | "Back Together" (2015) | "Down in the DM" (2015) |

Music video
- "Back Together" on YouTube

"Back Together" is a song by American singer Robin Thicke. It premiered on August 5, 2015. It was made available for digital download and released a single on August 6, 2015, by Interscope Records. The song, produced by Max Martin and Ali Payami, features a guest appearance from American rapper Nicki Minaj.

== Background and composition ==
Thicke and Minaj first collaborated on the track "Shakin' It 4 Daddy" for Thicke's fourth studio album Sex Therapy: The Session (2009). Speaking on Minaj's involvement during an interview for On Air with Ryan Seacrest, Thicke said, "I was working with Max Martin and [Savan Kotecha] and we had been messing with the song for a few months, and then Max finally got it to a place where he loved it and I thought it could use a little spice — a little edge. That’s when I sent it to Nicki and she loved it." "Back Together" is raging, disco-fied track.

During an interview with Good Morning America, when asked about the meaning of the song or if there were any intended allusions to his ex-wife (Paula Patton) Thicke explained, "Actually I didn't write the song so I can't take credit for the meaning, but when I met with the producers ... I just heard this idea of getting back together and getting yourself back together and, you know, what I was going through at the time I really related to that and connected with it so it's more about the theme of getting yourself back together with love and partnership".

== Radio version and music video ==
The radio version of the song is censored, replacing the word "fuck" with a sample of Thicke exclaiming "Ow!" in a falsetto. This version is also used in the music video.

The music video features Thicke in a tuxedo at a poolside resort with an attractive woman to whom he addresses the song. She pushes him into the pool, seeming to indicate she's upset with him. Later they are together again, seemingly on another day, getting along. Thicke then walks through the hotel and sees Minaj in her room, where she performs her part of the track. Minaj seems to seduce him, only to walk away when he acquiesces to her advances. Having now lost both women, Thicke leaves the hotel but stops to join a band performing outside.

== Critical reception ==
The song was described by Los Angeles Times music writer Mikael Wood as "a total banger, with a killer electro-disco groove ... and a delightfully raunchy guest verse by Nicki Minaj." Jon Blistein of Rolling Stone wrote, "'Back Together' boasts a bumping Studio 54 disco beat and buzzsaw synths reminiscent of the electro-pop surge led by Justice and Daft Punk. Thicke, however, sounds as soulful as ever, breezily crooning devoted paeans to a destructive love over Martin's catchy production."

== Music video ==
A music video for the song, directed by Ben Mor, was filmed in Miami. It was premiered via Thicke's VEVO channel on August 13, 2015.

== Live performances ==
Thicke has performed the song live on Good Morning America, The Late Late Show with James Corden, Jimmy Kimmel Live!, and The Tonight Show with Jimmy Fallon.

On May 21, 2017, Thicke performed this song at 4th Indonesian Choice Awards.

== Charts ==
Weekly chart performance for "Back Together"
| Chart (2015–16) | Peak position |
|---|---|
| Czech Republic Singles Digital (ČNS IFPI) | 79 |
| France (SNEP) | 144 |
| Italy (FIMI) | 73 |
| Netherlands (Dutch Tipparade 40) | 12 |
| Poland Airplay (ZPAV) | 28 |
| Slovakia Airplay (ČNS IFPI) | 57 |
| Slovakia Singles Digital (ČNS IFPI) | 69 |
| UK Singles (Official Charts) | 126 |
| US Bubbling Under Hot 100 (Billboard) | 25 |
| US Pop Airplay (Billboard) | 28 |
| US Hot R&B/Hip-Hop Songs (Billboard) | 41 |
| US Hot R&B Songs (Billboard) | 14 |

== Certifications and sales ==
Certifications for "Back Together"
| Region | Certification | Certified units/sales |
|---|---|---|
| Italy (FIMI) | Gold | 25,000^{‡} |
^{‡} Sales+streaming figures based on certification alone.
