= SoFly and Nius =

French music production team

SoFly & Nius
- Origin: France
- Genres: Hip hop, hip house, pop, R&B
- Occupation: Producers
- Years active: 2008–2021
- Labels: APG, Atlantic Records, Warner/Chappell Music
- Members: SoFly (Raphaël Judrin); Nius (Pierre-Antoine Melki)

SoFly and Nius (stylized as soFLY and Nius) were a French music production and songwriting duo signed to Artist Publishing Group (APG).

== Members ==
SoFly and Nius is made up of Raphaël Judrin (SoFly), born in Paris in 1985, and Pierre-Antoine Melki (Nius), born in Lyon in 1988. They regularly work with producer and songwriter Yoan Chirescu.

== Career ==
Before working together, Nius had produced tracks on M. Pokora's album Mise à jour, while SoFly was working on the Blue Tape projects with the rapper Vicelow. In France, they worked with artists including Rohff, AKH, Soprano, M. Pokora, Amel Bent, Shy'm and with the music collective Mafia K-1 Fry.

Moving to the United States, they also produced for a number of American artists including Cory Gunz ("A Little Taste"), rapper Tony Yayo and T. Mills. They produced Justin Bieber's "Take You" from the album Believe and five tracks in Flo Rida's album Wild Ones, including the title track and international hit "Wild Ones", featuring Sia, and the fourth single "I Cry". They also produced Enrique Iglesias's single "Finally Found You". Prince Royce's "It's My Time" from the album Phase II.

Their work has resulted in one Grammy Award nomination for 2013 Best Rap/Sung Collaboration (Wild Ones – Flo Rida featuring Sia). They were also chosen to be part of the jury, along with Hype Williams, for the first edition of the Dubai International Music Awards in November 2013.

== Discography ==
=== Singles ===
- 2011: Flo Rida – "Wild Ones" (feat. Sia)
- 2012: Flo Rida – "Let It Roll"
- 2012: Flo Rida – "I Cry"
- 2012: Enrique Iglesias – "Finally Found You" (feat. Sammy Adams)
- 2013: Flo Rida – "Sweet Spot" (feat. Jennifer Lopez)
- 2013: Inna – Dame Tu Amor (feat. Reik)
- 2014: Neon Jungle – Welcome to the Jungle
- 2014: Danny Mercer – Who Are You Loving Now
- 2015: Flo Rida – "I Don't Like It, I Love It" (feat. Robin Thicke)
- 2017: Maître Gims – Loin (feat. Dany Synthé, SoFly and Nius)
- 2018: Flo Rida – Sweet Sensation
- 2018: Mister V – Viano
- 2018: Logan Henderson – Pull Me Deep
- 2019: Austin Mahone – Anxious
- 2019: Maitre Gims – Pirate (feat. J. Balvin)
- 2019: Old Dominion – Young
- 2020: Kyle – See You When I am Famous – 02. Money Now (feat. Tyga and Johnny Yukon)
- 2021: Becky G and Burna Boy - Rotate
- 2021: Starboi3 – Dick (feat. Doja Cat)

=== Video games ===
Year	Game	Title	Artist	Notes
2012	FIFA 13	Let It Roll (Pt. 2)	Flo Rida feat. Lil Wayne	
2013	Army of Two: The Devil's Cartel	Double or Nothing	Big Boi & B.o.B.	Game's official theme song, made with Oddfellow
2024	Just Dance 2025 Edition	Stop This Fire	Nius (with uncredited vocals from Tiina)	
2024	Just Dance VR: Welcome to Dancity	Stop This Fire	Nius (with uncredited vocals from Tiina)	

=== Songs ===
- 2009: Timati – The Boss – 11. Love You (feat. Busta Rhymes and Mariya)
- 2011: T. Mills – Leaving Home – 07. Scandalous
- 2012: Flo Rida – Wild Ones – 5 tracks: 02. Wild Ones (feat. Sia), 03. Let It Roll, 06. Sweet Spot (feat. Jennifer Lopez), 08. I Cry, 10. Let It Roll, Pt 2 (feat. Lil Wayne)
- 2012: Justin Bieber – Believe – 05. Take You
- 2012: Prince Royce – Phase II – 11. It's My Time
- 2012: Enrique Iglesias – TBD – 00. Finally Found You (feat. Sammy Adams)
- 2012: Pitbull – Global Warming – 10. Tchu Tchu Tcha (feat. Enrique Iglesias)
- 2013: Inna – Party Never Ends – 2 tracks: Dame Tu Amor (feat. Reik), Light Up (feat. Reik)
- 2013: Rich Gang – Rich Gang – 12. Angel (feat. Mystikal, Jae Millz, Ace Hood, Gudda Gudda, Birdman & Mack Maine)
- 2013: B.o.B – Underground Luxury – 7. Coastline
- 2014: Kid Ink – My Own Lane – 12. No Miracles (feat. Elle Varner and Machine Gun Kelly)*
- 2014: Timeflies – After Hours – 06. All The Way
- 2014: Neon Jungle – Welcome to the Jungle – 02. Welcome to the Jungle
- 2014: Future – Honest – 14. Side Effect
- 2014: Danny Mercer – TBD – 00. Who Are You Loving Now
- 2015: Flo Rida – My House (EP) – 03. I Don't Like It, I Love It (feat. Robin Thicke)
- 2015: Flo Rida – TBD – Dirty Mind (feat. Sam Martin)
- 2015: Robin Schulz – Sugar – 07. Pride (feat. SoFly and Nius)**
- 2015: Furious 7 – Furious 7 OST – Francoise
- 2016: Flo Rida – TBD – 00. Dirty Mind (feat. Sam Martin)
- 2016: The Lonely Island – Popstar: Never Stop Never Stopping Soundtrack – 03. Equal Rights (feat. P!nk)*
- 2017: J Sutta – I Say Yes – 13. Feel Nothing (feat. Hopsin)
- 2017: Loïc Nottet – Selfocracy – 04. Dirty (feat. Lil Trip)*
- 2017: Maître Gims – Loin (feat. Dany Synthé, SoFly and Nius)**
- 2018: Flo Rida – Sweet Sensation
- 2018: Mister V – Viano
- 2018: Maty Noyes – New Friends
- 2018: Katelyn Tarver – Labels, Kool Aid
- 2018: Logan Henderson – Pull Me Deep
- 2019: Austin Mahone – Anxious
- 2019: Starboi3 – One More Time
- 2019: Maitre Gims – Pirate (feat. J. Balvin)
- 2019: Old Dominion – Young
- 2020: Rome Castille – Far From Home
- 2020: Kyle – See You When I Am Famous – 02. Money Now (feat. Tyga and Johnny Yukon)
- 2021: Becky G & Burna Boy - Rotate
- 2021: Tink - Might Let You (feat. Davido)
- 2021: Starboi3 – Dick (feat. Doja Cat)
- 2021: Mohamed Ramadan – Ya Habibi (feat. Gims)

Notes

* (additional strings from Yoan "Oddfellow" Chirescu)
** (as featured artists)
