= Dick (song) =

2019 single by StarBoi3 featuring Doja Cat

Single by StarBoi3 featuring Doja Cat
- Released: May 16, 2019; April 23, 2021 (re-release)
- Genre: Hip hop; trap
- Length: 2:55
- Label: RCA
- Songwriters: Tariq Smith; Amala Dlamini; Raphaël Judrin; Pierre-Antoine Melki; Andrew Gradwohl, Jr.
- Producers: soFly and Nius; BigWhiteBeatz

StarBoi3 singles chronology
"Way 2 Good" (2020)	"Dick" (2021)	"Lame" (2022)

Doja Cat singles chronology
"Kiss Me More" (2021)	"Dick" (2021)	"You Right" (2021)

Alternative cover
- Original cover

Music video
- "Dick" on YouTube

"Dick" is a song by American rapper StarBoi3 featuring American rapper and singer Doja Cat. It was originally released on May 16, 2019 on SoundCloud, before being re-released on April 23, 2021 by RCA Records after going viral on TikTok. The song was produced by soFly and Nius and BigWhiteBeatz.

== Background ==
The single was first released on May 16, 2019, as a SoundCloud exclusive. A sleeper hit, it began to gain popularity in March 2021, when TikToker @ali.scyn posted a video of her dancing to the song, starting a trend. Videos to the trend feature a section of the lyrics: "I'm getting ripped tonight / R.I.P. that pussy, ayyy / I'm going in tonight." Following its popularity on TikTok, the single was released through streaming services on April 23, 2021.

== Composition ==
The song features sexually explicit lyrics, as well as references to pop culture that "add a comedic twist". The instrumental features "trap-y vibes".

== Remixes ==
A remix pack was released on May 28, 2021, including three remixes to the song by L.Dre, DJ Jayhood, and Until Dawn. Another remix from Sickick was released on June 11, 2021. The official remix of the song features American rapper Ludacris and was released on August 20, 2021. A week later, a remix featuring both Doja Cat and Ludacris was released.

== Charts ==
Chart performance for "Dick"
Chart (2021)	Peak position
Australia (ARIA)	95
Belgium (Ultratip Bubbling Under Flanders)	63
Canada Hot 100 (Billboard)	77
France (SNEP)	192
Global 200 (Billboard)	94
Ireland (IRMA)	58
New Zealand Hot Singles (RMNZ)	12
Portugal (AFP)	109
UK Singles (Official Charts)	74
US Bubbling Under Hot 100 (Billboard)	3
US Hot R&B/Hip-Hop Songs (Billboard)	44

== Certifications ==
Certifications for "Dick"
Region	Certification	Certified units/sales
Brazil (Pro-Música Brasil)	3× Platinum	120,000^{‡}
New Zealand (RMNZ)	Gold	15,000^{‡}
United States (RIAA)	Gold	500,000^{‡}
^{‡} Sales+streaming figures based on certification alone.
