= Goin' In =

Single by Jennifer Lopez featuring Flo Rida

from the album Step Up Revolution: Music from the Motion Picture
- Released: June 8, 2012
- Recorded: 2012
- Studio: Pinky's Palace (Hidden Hills, CA)
- Genre: Electrohop
- Length: 4:09
- Label: Island Def Jam
- Songwriters: Michael Warren; Jamahl Listenbee; Joseph Angel; Sebastian Kole; David Quiñones; Tramar Dillard
- Producers: GoonRock; Kuk Harrell

Jennifer Lopez singles chronology
"Follow the Leader" (2012)	"Goin' In" (2012)	"Sweet Spot" (2013)

Flo Rida singles chronology
"Get Low" (2012)	"Goin' In" (2012)	"I Cry" (2012)

Music video
- "Goin' In" on YouTube

"Goin' In" is a song recorded by American singer Jennifer Lopez. The song features American rapper Flo Rida. It was co-written by Joseph Angel, Tramar Dillard, David Quiñones, Sebastian Kole, Michael Warren and Jamahl "GoonRock" Listenbee, who also produced the song. It is featured on the soundtrack of the dance film Step Up Revolution (2012) and on her first greatest hits album Dance Again... the Hits (2012). This is also the third song from the Step Up series to feature Flo Rida, after "Low" from Step Up 2: The Streets (2008) and "Club Can't Handle Me" from Step Up 3D (2010).

Lopez debuted "Goin' In" on the season final of American Idol May 23, 2012, as part of a medley with "Follow the Leader". Lopez wore an all-white outfit with a baseball cap and was backed on-stage by hip-hop dance crew ReQuest, who wore the same color scheme along with matching wigs.

== Background and release ==
On April 27, 2012, Digital Spy reported that Lopez had recorded two songs produced by GoonRock (who is well known for working with electrohop duo LMFAO on their international hit songs "Party Rock Anthem" and "Sexy and I Know It") and written by Ryan Tedder: "Clothes Off" and "Goin' In". On May 10, GoonRock posted a message on his Twitter account "Crazy day finishing 2012 's Song of the Summer for @jlo and @Official_flo #goinin." The song had its radio premiere on May 24, 2012, on Ryan Seacrest's radio show On Air with Ryan Seacrest. The song was made available for purchase on June 12, 2012.

== Writing and production ==
"Goin' In" was written by Michael Warren, Jamahl Listenbee, Joseph Angel, Sebastian Kole, David Quiñones and Tramar Dillard. Lopez's vocals were produced by Harrell and recorded at Pinky's Palace. Josh Stevens, Josh Gudwin and O'Ryan handled audio engineering of the song, with assistance from Falcone and Mack. Stevens was also a brand and music consultant for Goonrock at the conception of the record. The song features additional vocals from American rapper Lil Jon. GoonRock produced and later mixed the song alongside Kenny Moran at The House on the Hill Studios in Los Angeles, California. Of GoonRock, Lopez commented by stating that he is "very forward with his sound". After recording her vocals for the song, Flo Rida recorded guest vocals for the song. Those involved in the production of the song were extremely happy with the song before Flo Rida's rap appeared on it, but once his vocals were on the song it "took it over the top top". When choosing who she wanted to feature on the song, Lopez had several other rappers in mind, such as Big Sean. Lopez revealed: "We had a couple of people who said yes, that they would get on it, but [Flo Rida] just seemed like the perfect one." She further explained that the style of the song "really fit Flo Rida"; "It was half-dance, but half kind of hard too."

== Music and lyrics ==
"Goin' In" (2012)
A thirty second sample of "Goin' In".

"Goin' In" is a song co-written by Joseph Angel, Tramar Dillard, Jamahl "GoonRock" Listenbee, David Quiñones, Sebastian Kole and Michael Warren. The song was produced by GoonRock, who is known for his work with LMFAO on their international hit songs "Party Rock Anthem" and "Sexy and I Know It". The song contains a dance-ready beat that is "sure to make the club move". The song speaks of the freedom found in dance. "Goin' In" features an "energetic and entrancing beat" and is built into Flo Rida's "hyper-speed rhyme from Lopez's propulsive verse". After proclaiming "They're not stopping us tonight", Lopez switches between a "shimmering crescendo" to the song's "stadium-size" chorus. Ricko Florino of Artistdirect: "It's a vibrant and vivid banger of epic proportions, picking up where Lopez left on Love? and catapulting everything into a whole new stratosphere altogether."

== Reception ==
=== Commercial performance ===
On the week of August 6, 2012 "Goin' In" reached the top of the Billboard Dance Club/Play Songs, giving Lopez her thirteenth number one on that chart. It was additionally her tenth consecutive number one on the chart, tying Katy Perry for having the most consecutive numbers one on the chart. Over a month after its release to digital retailers, "Goin' In" had sold 31,000 downloads.

=== Critical response ===
Robbie Daw of Idolator claimed that "Goin' In" was "hardest club track we’ve heard from the J.Lo canon in recent years." Rick Florino of Artist Direct called "Goin' In" a "summer anthem", saying that it "won't leave your head even long after bikini season has wound down ... Once again, Jennifer Lopez delivers the ultimate global dance song."

== Music video ==
=== Development and synopsis ===
Lopez with crystal-covered lips and a pink-robe in the music video for "Goin' In"

The music video was filmed in June 2012. It was directed by Ace Norton. Flo Rida said about the video: "They had me performing around this Lamborghini, it was really different ’cause there was one scene where I got on this treadmill and they had me running while performing my verse. I had a chance to look back at the video and it seemed like over the top". In the music video, Lopez had lips which were covered in crystals, and each gem was individually glued onto Lopez’s lips by her makeup artist, Mary Phillips. It was similar to singer Katy Perry on the cover of Harper’s Bazaar, whose gems were also supplied by Swarovski. A sneak peek of the video was released on July 23, 2012. The full video premiered on July 25, 2012, on MTV's "MTV First: Jennifer Lopez" at 7:50 pm EST. Jocelyn Vena of MTV News described the video as "dazzling spectacle of grinding dance moves, eye-popping visuals and a whole lot of glitter" and also described the plot in a review:

"The video opens with Lopez blowing a dandelion with her crystal-covered lips. As the spores begin to take flight, they turn into glittery specs floating into space. It's the first of many moments that focus on what looks cool, instead of telling a cohesive story. Next, she dons a bright pink cape and is surrounded by white wolves, which then cuts to multiple setups of her in various sparkly outfits, popping and locking in front of "Waiting for Tonight"-inspired lasers and alongside an army of dancers. Neon paint spills everywhere, dancers punch through brightly-colored walls, people pound drums with colored sand, cars bounce about and fire hydrants spout colored liquid."

Footage from Step Up: Revolution, and appearances from Lil Jon and Flo Rida were incorporated too, including some of the film's cast.

The producer GoonRock makes a cameo around one minute into the video.

=== Reception ===
People said that the video is "definitely Jenny at her fiercest" and "high-energy." Chris Eggertsen of the website HitFix, said that the video wasn't anything special, labeling it as "signifying absolutely nothing." Eggertsen said: "What should also surprise no one is that the visuals in the video have correspondingly been amped up to 11, as if to distract from the track's failure to connect even as a guilty-pleasure pop confection." Emily Exton of Popdust wrote that: "Basically it’s a return to "the block," if said neighborhood’s street lights were replaced with lasers and its fire hydrants unleashed sprays of colorful body paint on groups of party-ready residents." Amy Sciarretto of PopCrush said that Lopez revisited her dance roots in the video, and that: "Yes, Lopez’s famous abs get equal screen time, as does her even more famous derriere. It’s a dance video through and through and it’s J. Lo doing what she did first and that’s grooving out on the dance floor." Sciarretoo also described it as "visually spastic." Robbie Daw of the website Idolator wrote that people hoping for "booty-shaking by Lopez won’t be disappointed" and that "It looks like J.Lo is all about color in this vid[eo]."

== Track listing ==
- Digital download
1. "Goin' In" – 4:07
- Digital download — remixes
1. "Goin' In" (Michael Woods Remix) – 6:22
2. "Goin' In" (Michael Woods Remix Edit) – 4:14
3. "Goin' In" (Michael Woods Dub) – 6:22
4. "Goin' In" (Michael Woods Instrumental) – 6:22
5. "Goin' In" (Gustavo Scorpio Club Mix) – 7:44
6. "Goin' In" (Gustavo Scorpio Edit) – 4:35
7. "Goin' In" (Gustavo Scorpio Dub) – 7:44
8. "Goin' In" (Jacob Plant Remix) – 4:40

== Credits and personnel ==
Recording

- Lead vocals recorded at Pinky's Palace
- Mixed at The House On The Hill Studios, Los Angeles, California
- Background vocals recorded at Henson Recording Studios, Los Angeles, California
- Additional vocals recorded at Sigma Sound Studios, Philadelphia, Pennsylvania
- Mastered at The Mastering Palace, New York City, New York

Personnel

- Michael Warren – songwriter
- Jamahl Listenbee (GoonRock) – songwriter, producer, mixer
- Joseph Angel – songwriter
- Sebastian Kole – songwriter
- David Quiñones – songwriter
- Tramar Dillard – songwriter
- Kuk Harrell – vocal producer
- Josh Gudwin – engineer
- Chris "Tek" O'Ryan – engineer
- Josh Stevens - engineer, assistant producer/ A&R consultant
- Kiley Cubicciotti - engineer
- Anthony Falcone – assistant engineer
- Peter Mack – assistant engineer
- Kenny Moran – mixer
- Jennifer Lopez - lead vocals
- Josie Aiello – background vocals
- Joseph Angel – background vocals
- Lil Jon – additional vocals
- Dave Kutch – mastering

== Charts ==
=== Weekly charts ===
Chart (2012)	Peak position
Austria (Ö3 Austria Top 40)	58
Belgium (Ultratip Bubbling Under Flanders)	3
Belgium Dance (Ultratop Flanders)	48
Belgium Urban (Ultratop Flanders)	15
Belgium (Ultratip Bubbling Under Wallonia)	4
Belgium Dance (Ultratip Wallonia)	13
Brazil (Billboard Hot 100)	29
Brazil (Billboard Hot Pop Songs)	12
Canada Hot 100 (Billboard)	54
Germany (GfK)	67
Global Dance Tracks (Billboard)	5
Honduras (Honduras Top 50)	28
Italy (FIMI)	99
Mexico Airplay (Billboard)	85
Netherlands (Dutch Top 40 Tipparade)	11
Romania (Romanian Top 100)	87
South Korea (Gaon International Digital Chart)	11
US Dance Club Songs (Billboard)	1
US Hot Latin Songs (Billboard)	31

=== Year-end charts ===
Chart (2012)	Position
US Hot Dance Club Songs (Billboard)	16

== Certifications ==
Region	Certification	Certified units/sales
Brazil (Pro-Música Brasil)	Gold	30,000^{‡}
^{‡} Sales+streaming figures based on certification alone.

== Release history ==
Country	Date	Format	Label
Australia	June 8, 2012	Digital download	The Island Def Jam Music Group
France	June 8, 2012	Digital download	The Island Def Jam Music Group
Sweden	June 8, 2012	Digital download	The Island Def Jam Music Group
Portugal	June 8, 2012	Digital download	The Island Def Jam Music Group
New Zealand	June 8, 2012	Digital download	The Island Def Jam Music Group
Luxembourg	June 8, 2012	Digital download	The Island Def Jam Music Group
Finland	June 8, 2012	Digital download	The Island Def Jam Music Group
Austria	June 8, 2012	Digital download	The Island Def Jam Music Group
Switzerland	June 8, 2012	Digital download	The Island Def Jam Music Group
Brazil	June 8, 2012	Digital download	The Island Def Jam Music Group
Greece	June 8, 2012	Digital download	The Island Def Jam Music Group
Bulgaria	June 8, 2012	Digital download	The Island Def Jam Music Group
Belgium	June 8, 2012	Digital download	The Island Def Jam Music Group
Chile	June 8, 2012	Digital download	The Island Def Jam Music Group
Argentina	June 8, 2012	Digital download	The Island Def Jam Music Group
Denmark	June 8, 2012	Digital download	The Island Def Jam Music Group
Japan	June 8, 2012	Digital download	The Island Def Jam Music Group
Norway	June 8, 2012	Digital download	The Island Def Jam Music Group
Netherlands	June 8, 2012	Digital download	The Island Def Jam Music Group
Italy	June 8, 2012	Digital download	The Island Def Jam Music Group
Spain	June 8, 2012	Digital download	The Island Def Jam Music Group
Canada	June 12, 2012	Digital download	The Island Def Jam Music Group
Mexico	June 12, 2012	Digital download	The Island Def Jam Music Group
United States	June 12, 2012	Digital download	Island Records
United States	June 18, 2012	Mainstream and rhythmic radio	Island Records
United Kingdom	July 8, 2012	Digital download	Mercury Records
United States	July 10, 2012	Digital download — Remixes	Island Records
Portugal	July 13, 2012	Digital download — Remixes	The Island Def Jam Group
Norway	July 13, 2012	Digital download — Remixes	The Island Def Jam Group
New Zealand	July 13, 2012	Digital download — Remixes	The Island Def Jam Group
Netherlands	July 13, 2012	Digital download — Remixes	The Island Def Jam Group
Luxembourg	July 13, 2012	Digital download — Remixes	The Island Def Jam Group
Japan	July 13, 2012	Digital download — Remixes	The Island Def Jam Group
Italy	July 13, 2012	Digital download — Remixes	The Island Def Jam Group
Ireland	July 13, 2012	Digital download — Remixes	The Island Def Jam Group
Greece	July 13, 2012	Digital download — Remixes	The Island Def Jam Group
Finland	July 13, 2012	Digital download — Remixes	The Island Def Jam Group
Denmark	July 13, 2012	Digital download — Remixes	The Island Def Jam Group
Belgium	July 13, 2012	Digital download — Remixes	The Island Def Jam Group
Australia	July 13, 2012	Digital download — Remixes	The Island Def Jam Group
United Kingdom	July 22, 2012	Digital download — Remixes	Mercury Records
Germany	July 27, 2012	Digital Download	The Island Def Jam Music Group

== See also ==
- List of number-one dance singles of 2012 (U.S.)
