= Sweet Spot (Flo Rida song) =

Single by Flo Rida featuring Jennifer Lopez

from the album Wild Ones
- Released: March 13, 2013
- Recorded: 2012
- Studio: Atlantic Records Studios (Los Angeles)
- Genre: Hip house; dance-pop
- Length: 3:48
- Label: Poe Boy; Atlantic
- Songwriters: Tramar Dillard; Raphael Judrin; Pierre-Antoine Melki; Breyan Issac; Julie Frost
- Producers: SoFly and Nius; Jacob Luttrell; Kuk Harrell

Flo Rida singles chronology
"Say You're Just a Friend" (2012)	"Sweet Spot" (2013)	"Let It Roll" (2013)

Jennifer Lopez singles chronology
"Goin' In" (2012)	"Sweet Spot" (2013)	"Live It Up" (2013)

Lyric video
- "Sweet Spot" on YouTube

"Sweet Spot" is a song recorded by American rapper Flo Rida for his fourth studio album Wild Ones (2012). It features guest vocals from American singer Jennifer Lopez. He also wrote it with Raphael Judrin, Pierre-Antoine Melki, Breyan Issac and Julie Frost. "Sweet Spot" was produced by SoFly and Nius; Jacob Luttrell produced Flo Rida's vocals for the song, while Kuk Harrell produced Lopez's.

"Sweet Spot" is Flo Rida and Lopez' second collaboration after the 2012 dance hit "Goin' In".

== Background ==
"Sweet Spot" marks Flo Rida and Lopez's second collaboration. He was previously featured on her dance single "Goin' In" (2012), which was included on the Step Up Revolution soundtrack. Prior to the release of "Goin' In", Flo Rida confirmed that Lopez would be featured on his album Wild Ones during an interview with Fuse. He stated that after Lopez reached out to have him feature on "Goin' In", he said "Hey, let's just swap it out", and asked her to be featured on a song of his. Flo Rida explained, "I definitely look forward to expanding my career in the Latin market just doing a record with her and both of the records are amazing, so I look forward to having a lot more success with these records". That June, it was reported that "Sweet Spot" would be released as a single from Wild Ones. Its single release was officially confirmed in January 2013. On March 13, 2013, a new version of the song, with Japanese singer May J. was released. May J.'s vocals replaced all of Lopez's. "Sweet Spot" was remixed by Sem Thomasson, Justin Prime and Jordy Dazz; all of these remixes were present on Flo Rida's remix EP, "Let It Roll", which was released on March 26, 2013.

== Music and lyrics ==
"Sweet Spot" is a song with a length of three minutes and forty-eight seconds (3:48). Flo Rida said "Sweet Spot" is a "very catchy" melodic record. The song was described as having a melodic tune, in which Lopez used softer, higher-pitched vocals than she is typically heard using. "Sweet Spot" opened with Lopez singing over its midtempo hook "Let's hit the sweet spot / I'm ready to go / I want candy tonight", followed by Flo Rida with his "signature rhymes", "I want to take you back to my spot / You can be the candy girl in my shop / We both know what we are cravin’ why not / Make tonight first class with no stops". The lyrics have been described as "saccharin", and seductive.

== Critical response ==
Becky Bain of the website Idolator described Lopez as Flo Rida's "perfect party companion", while Robert Copsey of Digital Spy said Flo Rida had "Lopez painstakingly linking candy with G-spots" on the song. While reviewing the album Wild Ones, Melissa Maerz from Entertainment Weekly said "Beneath the onslaught of house beats" guests such as Lopez "sound like they've auditioned for the nameless, faceless role of Hook-Singing Female".

Jenna Hally Rubenstein of MTV Buzzworthy likened Lopez's vocals to that of Britney Spears, and said "Unfortunately, Flo's verse kinda sorta definitely sounds a little indistinguishable from other verses". Katherine St Asaph of PopDust felt that "Sweet Spot" was "a million times better" than the pair's previous collaboration, "Goin' In". Asaph, while disregarding Flo Rida's rapping as "identical" to "everything else" he has done, went on the praise Lopez's vocals, stating: "J. Lo’s part, however, is something else entirely [...] it’s undeniably pretty. At the very least, it deserves to shut up everyone who says Lopez’s voice is bland". Asaph said it wasn't a "good track" but one of the "most interesting" things Flo Rida has ever done. Josh Langhoff of PopMatters, on the other hand, criticized Lopez's vocals by labeling her "blank-voiced". Billboard's Chris Payne called the duet "steamy" and compared it to 50 Cent's single "Candy Shop" (2005).

== Chart performance ==
For the week ending March 31, 2013, "Sweet Spot" debuted at number 31 in Australia, and peaked at number 25 the following week. It was later certified gold by the Australian Recording Industry Association.

== Music video ==
Filming for the "Sweet Spot" music video was slated to begin filming in July 2012. On June 27, 2012, a lyric video for the song was uploaded to Flo Rida's YouTube channel. It included "bubble gum, lollipops, ice cream, and tasty looking women all through a fisheye lens".

== Charts and certifications ==
=== Charts ===
Chart (2012–13)	Peak position
Australia (ARIA)	25
Austria (Ö3 Austria Top 40)	39
Belgium (Ultratip Bubbling Under Flanders)	6
Czech Republic Airplay (ČNS IFPI)	63
France (SNEP)	195
Netherlands (Dutch Top 40 Tipparade)	8
Poland Dance (ZPAV)	33
Russia (Tophit Weekly General Airplay)	173
Slovakia Airplay (ČNS IFPI)	44

=== Certifications ===
Region	Certification	Certified units/sales
Australia (ARIA)	Gold	35,000^{^}
^{^} Shipments figures based on certification alone.

== Release history ==
Release dates and formats for "Sweet Spot"
Region	Date	Format	Version	Label	Ref.
Japan	March 13, 2013	Digital download	May J.	Atlantic	
United States	March 18, 2013	Digital download	Remixes	Atlantic	
