= Get Low (Waka Flocka Flame song) =

2012 single by Waka Flocka Flame featuring Nicki Minaj, Tyga and Flo Rida

Single by Waka Flocka Flame featuring Nicki Minaj, Tyga, and Flo Rida

from the album Triple F Life: Friends, Fans & Family
- Released: June 5, 2012
- Genre: Southern hip-hop
- Length: 4:16
- Label: 1017 Brick Squad; Brick Squad Monopoly; Asylum; Warner Bros.
- Songwriters: Juaquin Malphurs; Onika Maraj; Michael Stevenson; Tramar Dillard; Harvey Miller; Breyan Isaac
- Producers: DJ Speedy; Breyan Isaac

Waka Flocka Flame singles chronology
"Lights Down Low" (2012)	"Get Low" (2012)	"Funky Zoo" (2013)

Nicki Minaj singles chronology
"Beez in the Trap" (2012)	"Get Low" (2012)	"Pound the Alarm" (2012)

Tyga singles chronology
"Ayy Ladies" (2012)	"Get Low" (2012)	"I Love Girls" (2012)

Flo Rida singles chronology
"Whistle" (2012)	"Get Low" (2012)	"Goin' In" (2012)

Music video
- "Get Low" on YouTube

"Get Low" is a song by American rapper Waka Flocka Flame featuring Nicki Minaj, Tyga and Flo Rida. It was released on June 5, 2012 as the third single from Flame's second studio album, Triple F Life: Friends, Fans & Family. The song was produced by DJ Speedy and Breyan Isaac.

== Music video ==
The music video was filmed on July 23, 2012 in Atlanta and was directed by Benny Boom. The video features a cameo appearance from fellow Southern rapper Gucci Mane. The music video premiered on 106 & Park on August 31, 2012. Flo Rida does not appear in the video.

== Charts ==
Chart (2012)	Peak position
Canada (Canadian Hot 100)	58
US Billboard Hot 100	72
US Hot R&B/Hip-Hop Songs (Billboard)	67
