= Morning Sun (Robin Thicke song) =

Single by Robin Thicke
- Released: June 30, 2015
- Recorded: 2015
- Genre: R&B; soul; disco
- Length: 3:29
- Label: Interscope
- Songwriters: Robin Thicke; Barry White

Robin Thicke singles chronology
"I Don't Like It, I Love It" (2015)	"Morning Sun" (2015)	"Back Together" (2015)

"Morning Sun" is a song by American recording artist Robin Thicke. It was made available for digital download and released as a standalone single on June 30, 2015, by Interscope Records.

== Track listing ==
- Download digital
1. Morning Sun — 3:29

== Music video ==
On June 29, 2015 Thicke uploaded the lyric video for "Morning Sun" on his YouTube and Vevo account.

== Charts ==
Chart (2015)	Peak position
US Adult R&B Songs (Billboard)	4
US R&B/Hip-Hop Airplay (Billboard)	23
US Hot R&B Songs (Billboard)	23
