= My House (EP) =

EP by Flo Rida
- Released: April 7, 2015
- Recorded: 2014
- Genres: Hip-hop; house
- Length: 23:13
- Labels: International; Poe Boy; Atlantic

Flo Rida chronology
Wild Ones (2012)	My House (2015)

Flo Rida EP chronology
Good Feeling (2012)	My House (2015)

Singles from My House
- 1. "G.D.F.R." Released: October 21, 2014; 2. "I Don't Like It, I Love It" Released: March 31, 2015; 3. "My House" Released: September 24, 2015

Professional ratings
Review scores
Source	Rating
AllMusic	3.5/5 stars

My House is the second extended play by American rapper Flo Rida. It was released on April 7, 2015, by International Music Group, Poe Boy Entertainment, and Atlantic Records. It is Flo Rida's first release to feature original material since Wild Ones (2012). It features guest appearances from Robin Thicke, Verdine White, Akon, Chris Brown, Sage the Gemini, Lookas, DJ Frank E and Fitz.

== Commercial performance ==
The album debuted at number 14 on the Billboard 200 with 27,000 equivalent album units; it sold 8,000 copies in its first week, and boasted over 5 million streams.

== Track listing ==
No.	Title	Writer(s)	Producer(s)	Length
1.	"Once in a Lifetime"	Gamal Lewis; Henry Walter; Jacob Hindlin Kasher; Joshua Coleman; Lukasz Gottwald; Martin Johnsson; Tramar Dillard	Ammo; Rickard Göransson; Dr. Luke	3:34
2.	"My House"	Ross Golan; Johan Carlsson; Marco Borrero; Roy Hammond; Dillard	Carlsson; MAG; JayFrance	3:12
3.	"I Don't Like It, I Love It" (featuring Robin Thicke and Verdine White)	Alexander Izquierdo; Breyan Isaac; Geoffrey Early; Gary Hill; Jamie Sanderson; Pierre-Antoine Melki; Raphaël Judrin; Thomas Troelsen; Dillard	soFLY & Nius; Yoan Chirescu; Ryan Gladieux; Aton Ben-Horin	3:44
4.	"Wobble"	Antonio Mobley; Isaac; Rudolph Toombs; Dillard; William Lobban-Bean	Cook Classics; Mike Caren	3:06
5.	"Here It Is" (featuring Chris Brown)	Izquierdo; Justin Franks; Hill; Josh Abraham; Oliver Goldstein; Teemu Brunila; Thomas Troelsen; Dillard	Abraham; Oligee; Gladieux; Ben-Horin; DJ Frank E	3:12
6.	"G.D.F.R." (featuring Sage the Gemini and Lookas)	Charles Miller; Dominic Woods; Gerald Goldstein; Harold Brown; Howard Scott; Franks; Lee Oskar; Leroy Jordan; Caren; Morris Dickerson; Sylvester Allen; Dillard	DJ Frank E; Andrew Cedar; Miles Beard; Lucas Rego	3:10
7.	"That's What I Like" (featuring Fitz of Fitz and the Tantrums)	Isaac; Frederick Hibbert; Sanderson; Jimmy Marinos; Mike Skill; Brunila; Troelsen; Dillard; Marcos Palacios; Ernest Clark; Vincent "Vinny" Venditto; Wally Palamarchuk	Sermstyle; Brunila; Venditto; Axident; Ben-Horin; Ben Maddahi; Beard; JP Negrete; Gladieux	3:15
Total length:				23:13

My House – Japan bonus tracks
No.	Title	Length
8.	"G.D.F.R." (featuring Sage the Gemini and Lookas) (DJ Kay Rich x Up 2 No Good Remix)	2:54
9.	"G.D.F.R." (featuring Sage the Gemini and Lookas) (K Theory Remix)	3:07
10.	"G.D.F.R." (featuring Sage the Gemini and Lookas) (Noodles Remix)	4:24
Total length:		33:38

My House – Japan 2016 special edition bonus tracks
No.	Title	Length
8.	"Who's with Me"	3:30
9.	"Dirty Mind" (featuring Sam Martin)	3:03
10.	"Hello Friday" (featuring Jason Derulo)	3:21
11.	"At Night" (featuring Liz Elias and Akon)	3:58
12.	"Who Did You Love" (with Arianna)	3:10
Total length:		40:15

== Charts ==
=== Weekly charts ===
Chart (2015–16)	Peak position
Australian Digital Albums (ARIA)	37
Canadian Albums (Billboard)	9
Danish Albums (Hitlisten)	10
Finnish Albums (Suomen virallinen lista)	17
Japanese Albums (Oricon)	148
Norwegian Albums (VG-lista)	1
Swedish Albums (Sverigetopplistan)	8
UK Albums (Official Charts Company)	114
US Billboard 200	14
US Top R&B/Hip-Hop Albums (Billboard)	10

=== Year-end charts ===
Chart (2015)	Position
Danish Albums (Hitlisten)	48
Japanese Albums (Billboard Japan)	98
Swedish Albums (Sverigetopplistan)	42
US Billboard 200	109
Chart (2016)	Position
Canadian Albums (Billboard)	42
Danish Albums (Hitlisten)	69
Swedish Albums (Sverigetopplistan)	37
US Billboard 200	49
US Top R&B/Hip-Hop Albums (Billboard)	80

== Certifications ==
Region	Certification	Certified units/sales
Denmark (IFPI Danmark)	Platinum	20,000^{‡}
New Zealand (RMNZ)	Gold	7,500^{‡}
United Kingdom (BPI)	Silver	60,000^{‡}
^{‡} Sales+streaming figures based on certification alone.

== Notes ==
Track 7, "That's What I Like", was first heard during a trailer for The Peanuts Movie. It was later used in the film during a montage sequence where Charlie Brown becomes popular in school, after scoring a perfect score on his test. (Which was actually Peppermint Patty's)
