= I Don't Like It, I Love It =

Single by Flo Rida featuring Robin Thicke and Verdine White

from the album My House
- Released: March 31, 2015
- Recorded: 2014
- Length: 3:45
- Label: International Music Group; Poe Boy; Atlantic
- Songwriters: Alexander Izquierdo; Breyan Stanley Isaac; Geoffrey Early; Gary Hill; Jamie Sanderson; Pierre-Antoine Melki; Raphaël Judrin; Thomas Troelsen; Tramar Dillard
- Producers: soFLY & Nius; Yoan Chirescu; Ryan Gladieux; Aton Ben-Horin

Flo Rida singles chronology
"G.D.F.R." (2014)	"I Don't Like It, I Love It" (2015)	"My House" (2015)

Robin Thicke singles chronology
"Get Her Back" (2014)	"I Don't Like It, I Love It" (2015)	"Morning Sun" (2015)

Verdine White singles chronology
"I Don't Like It, I Love It" (2015)

Music video
- "I Don't Like It, I Love It" on YouTube

"I Don't Like It, I Love It" is a song by American rapper Flo Rida from his fifth studio album My House. The song features American singer Robin Thicke and Earth, Wind & Fire bassist Verdine White. It was released as the album's third promotional single on March 31, 2015. The song was released as the album's second official single on June 19, 2015, in the Republic of Ireland and on June 21 in the United Kingdom. In the latter country, BBC Radio 1's Nick Grimshaw began playing an unofficial version of the song in which soundbites by Audrey Roberts (portrayed by Sue Nicholls) from the long-running British soap opera Coronation Street were played over it. The song was heard in the climax of the 2016 comedy film Ride Along 2.

== Music video ==
The music video features Flo Rida and Robin Thicke but not Verdine White. The video, directed by Director X, is set on row of brownstones in Jersey City during a block party on a Summer day. In the video, Flo Rida and Thicke casually flirt with women passing by; ice cream is distributed to the neighborhood and children play in the spraying water of an open fire hydrant. The video ends with Flo-Rida, Thicke and party-goers dancing together in the street into the night.

== Track listing ==
- Digital download
1. "I Don't Like It, I Love It" (featuring Robin Thicke and Verdine White) – 3:43
2. "I Don't Like It, I Love It" (featuring Robin Thicke and Verdine White) (Syzz Remix) – 3:13
3. "I Don't Like It, I Love It" (featuring Robin Thicke and Verdine White) (Kasum Remix) – 3:20
4. "I Don't Like It, I Love It" (featuring Robin Thicke and Verdine White) (DiscoTech Remix) – 3:46
5. "I Don't Like It, I Love It" (featuring Robin Thicke and Verdine White) (G Buck Remix) – 3:22
6. "I Don't Like It, I Love It" (featuring Robin Thicke and Verdine White) (Cutmore Remix) – 3:34
7. "I Don't Like It, I Love It" (featuring Robin Thicke and Verdine White) (Noodles Remix) – 3:41
8. "I Don't Like It, I Love It" (featuring Robin Thicke and Verdine White) (House Remix – 4:24
9. "I Don't Like It, I Love It" (featuring Robin Thicke and Verdine White) (Elvis Suarez & Neil Jackson Remix) – 2:37

== Charts ==
=== Weekly charts ===
Chart (2015)	Peak position
Australia (ARIA)	17
Austria (Ö3 Austria Top 40)	7
Belgium (Ultratop 50 Flanders)	22
Belgium (Ultratop 50 Wallonia)	44
Canada Hot 100 (Billboard)	30
Czech Republic Singles Digital (ČNS IFPI)	52
Denmark (Tracklisten)	17
Euro Digital Song Sales (Billboard)	6
France (SNEP)	31
Germany (GfK)	19
Hungary (Editors' Choice Top 40)	8
Hungary (Stream Top 40)	23
Ireland (IRMA)	8
Italy (FIMI)	31
Italian Airplay (EarOne)	55
Lebanon (OLT20)	18
Mexico Anglo (Monitor Latino)	10
Netherlands (Dutch Top 40)	18
Netherlands (Single Top 100)	19
New Zealand (Recorded Music NZ)	8
Norway (VG-lista)	25
Poland Airplay (ZPAV)	4
Scottish Singles Sales (Official Charts)	4
Slovenia (SloTop50)	26
Spain (Promusicae)	24
Sweden (Sverigetopplistan)	33
Switzerland (Schweizer Hitparade)	25
UK Singles (Official Charts)	7
US Billboard Hot 100	43
US Hot Rap Songs (Billboard)	10
US Dance Airplay (Billboard)	35
US Pop Airplay (Billboard)	20
US Rhythmic Airplay (Billboard)	27

=== Year-end charts ===
Chart (2015)	Position
Australia (ARIA)	81
Austria (Ö3 Austria Top 40)	74
Denmark (Tracklisten)	70
France (SNEP)	141
Germany (Official German Charts)	75
Netherlands (Dutch Top 40)	79
Netherlands (Single Top 100)	50
New Zealand (Recorded Music NZ)	47
Poland (ZPAV)	40
Spain (PROMUSICAE)	60
UK Singles (OCC)	68

== Certifications ==
Region	Certification	Certified units/sales
Australia (ARIA)	Platinum	70,000^{‡}
Denmark (IFPI Danmark)	Platinum	60,000^{^}
Germany (BVMI)	Gold	200,000^{‡}
Italy (FIMI)	Platinum	50,000^{‡}
New Zealand (RMNZ)	2× Platinum	60,000^{‡}
Poland (ZPAV)	Gold	25,000^{‡}
Spain (Promusicae)	Platinum	40,000^{‡}
United Kingdom (BPI)	Platinum	600,000^{‡}
United States (RIAA)	Platinum	1,000,000^{‡}
^{^} Shipments figures based on certification alone.^{‡} Sales+streaming figures based on certification alone.

== Release history ==
Region	Date	Format	Label
Europe	March 31, 2015	Digital download — promotional single	International Music Group; Poe Boy Entertainment; Atlantic Records
Ireland	June 19, 2015	Digital download	International Music Group; Poe Boy Entertainment; Atlantic Records
United Kingdom	June 21, 2015	Digital download	International Music Group; Poe Boy Entertainment; Atlantic Records
Italy	July 3, 2015	Contemporary hit radio	International Music Group; Poe Boy Entertainment; Atlantic Records
