= Whistle (Flo Rida song) =

Single by Flo Rida

from the album Wild Ones
- Released: April 24, 2012
- Recorded: 2011
- Genre: hip house; pop rap; electropop
- Length: 3:45
- Label: Poe Boy; Atlantic
- Songwriters: Tramar Dillard; David Glass; Marcus Killian; Justin Franks; Breyan Isaac; Antonio Mobley
- Producers: DJ Frank E; Glass

Flo Rida singles chronology
| "Wild Ones" (2011) | "Whistle" (2012) | "Get Low" (2012) |

Music video
- "Whistle" on YouTube

"Whistle" is a song by American rapper Flo Rida from his fourth album Wild Ones (2012). It was released on April 24, 2012, as the third single from the album. "Whistle" was written by Flo Rida, David Glass, Marcus Killian, Justin Franks, Breyan Isaac and Antonio Mobley while production was handled by DJ Frank E and Glass. "Whistle" is an electropop, hip house, and pop rap song characterized by a whistling melody.

Upon its release, the song received mixed to negative reviews from music critics, who generally panned the lyrical content and Flo Rida's vocal performance, but praised its pop sound and noted that it had the potential of becoming another hit with its "catchy" hook. The cover image of the single also drew praise for its subtlety and originality. "Whistle" peaked at the top of the Billboard Hot 100, becoming Flo Rida's third number one hit and his first since 2009's "Right Round". Outside of the United States, "Whistle" topped the charts in several countries, including Australia, Canada, Ireland, and New Zealand, and peaked within the top ten of the charts in many others, including Denmark, the Netherlands, Spain, and the United Kingdom.

An accompanying music video for the song, directed by Marc Klasfeld, was released on May 24, 2012. It was filmed in Acapulco, Mexico and makes use of split screen at various points. It mostly shows shots of Flo Rida and several girls on a beach. Upon its release, it received mixed to positive reviews from critics, who noted that it was a perfect accompaniment for the song. Flo Rida also promoted the song by performing it during the finale of the talent show, The Voice. This song is the second track on Now 44, and a cover of the song from a Josh Hutcherson fan video became a popular meme in 2023.

== Background and composition ==
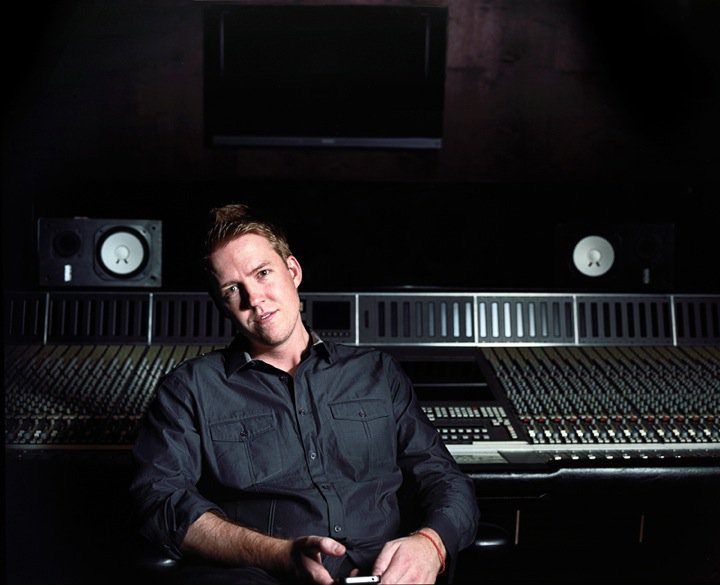
DJ Frank E (pictured) was one of the co-writers and co-producers of "Whistle".

"Whistle" was written by Flo Rida, David Glass, Marcus Killian, DJ Frank E, Breyan Isaac, and Antonio Mobley while production was handled by DJ Frank E and Glass. The song premiered online in April 2012. During an interview with Billboard magazine, Flo Rida described the song as "the biggest record I've done yet". Later, during an interview with MTV News, Flo Rida revealed that the lyrics of the song are sung in a metaphorical way, saying that it had sexually suggestive lyrics. He noted, "Well, put your own swing on it, but for the most part I keep it clean, but if you listen to it, you can take it another way as well". When asked how does he know where to draw the line between sexually suggestive and downright dirty lyrics, he acknowledged that when he's in the studio, "I have my boys in there and they'll tell me and give me their suggestions and what they think..... If it's too much I'll go back."

"Whistle" is an electropop song written in the key of C major, with a tempo of 104 beats per minute, instrumentally complete with a guitar and a whistling melody. It opens with a whistle heard in the background. Robbie Daw of the website Idolator, Kevin Rutherford of Billboard magazine and Katherine St Asaph noted that the use of whistling throughout the song was very similar to Maroon 5's and Christina Aguilera's 2011 song "Moves like Jagger". Rutherford further compared it with OneRepublic's 2010 song "Good Life".

== Critical reception ==
"There's the real problem, and it's probably inevitable: between the guitar mess and chorus comedown, 'Whistle' wants to be something like a Gym Class Heroes or Maroon 5 track. But both those groups use hook singers: Adam Levine, Neon Hitch, Bruno Mars. Flo's just got himself, and he can't make the verses more than throwaways or deliver a chorus that probably wouldn't even work without him. He doesn't have a sample, either, to steal the show. He's just got his anonymous self and that whistle. 'Moves Like Jagger' had a very similar whistle, and a month in, its (very similar) whistle sample stopped sounding catchy and started to sound mocking. 'Whistle' already does."

— Katherine St Asaph, Popdust

Upon the release of the song, it received polarized reviews from music critics. A writer of Rap-Up described it as "catchy" and further wrote that it contains a whistling chorus, "that you won't be able to get out of your head".

Kevin Rutherford of Billboard magazine praised the song, writing: "The result is a sun-drenched, happy-go-lucky tune, that's sure to provide Flo with a horse in the summer anthem race... Flo's not a formidable singer, so his latest offering may lack the pop pizzazz of 'Good Feeling' and 'Wild Ones.' But with the track's care-free vibe, the rapper's transgressions are easy to forgive." Robert Copsey of Digital Spy was negative about the song, grading it with two out of five stars and adding, "Even more surprising is that in this instance, the Florida-born rapper hasn't relied on an accomplice to bolster the song's commercial appeal. He's not even dug out a song from yesteryear to sample. In that sense, 'Whistle' could be the most original song Flo Rida has turned out to date; even if the metaphor dreamed up by its thirteen co-producers is anything but."

Upon the release of "Whistle", many music critics commented on the song's sexually suggestive lyrics, with many claiming that the chorus is a subtle reference to oral sex. Daw and Rutherford described it as "the least subtle song ever". Rob Markman of MTV News noted that he makes "catchy tunes that appeal to the masses, but Flo is also a master of the double entendre, masking some pretty suggestive lyrics with a candy-pop coating. His latest single, 'Whistle,' is a perfect example." Markman further noted that Flo Rida's 2009 hit "Right Round" contained sexual suggestive lyrics. Katherine St Asaph of the website Popdust, gave a negative review for the song, grading it with one-and-a-half out of five stars and writing:

"The gimmick here, as you've probably guessed, is a whistled hook. This is a problem. Whistling was last year's trend, and a certain pair of Jagger-movers made it overplayed. Whistling the melody to 'Just Can't Get Enough' is not an improvement. Nor is pairing it with a double-entendre ripped off near-verbatim from Lauren Bacall–a metaphor ruined by being made more explicit. Flo's obvious enough to taunt 'blow my whistle, baby,' but his quoted instructions would not literally work. 'Whistle while you work it,' later, might have worked–it's a snowclone just stupid enough to stick as a hook–but Flo smothers it in a bunch of Flo Rida delivery."

== Chart performance ==
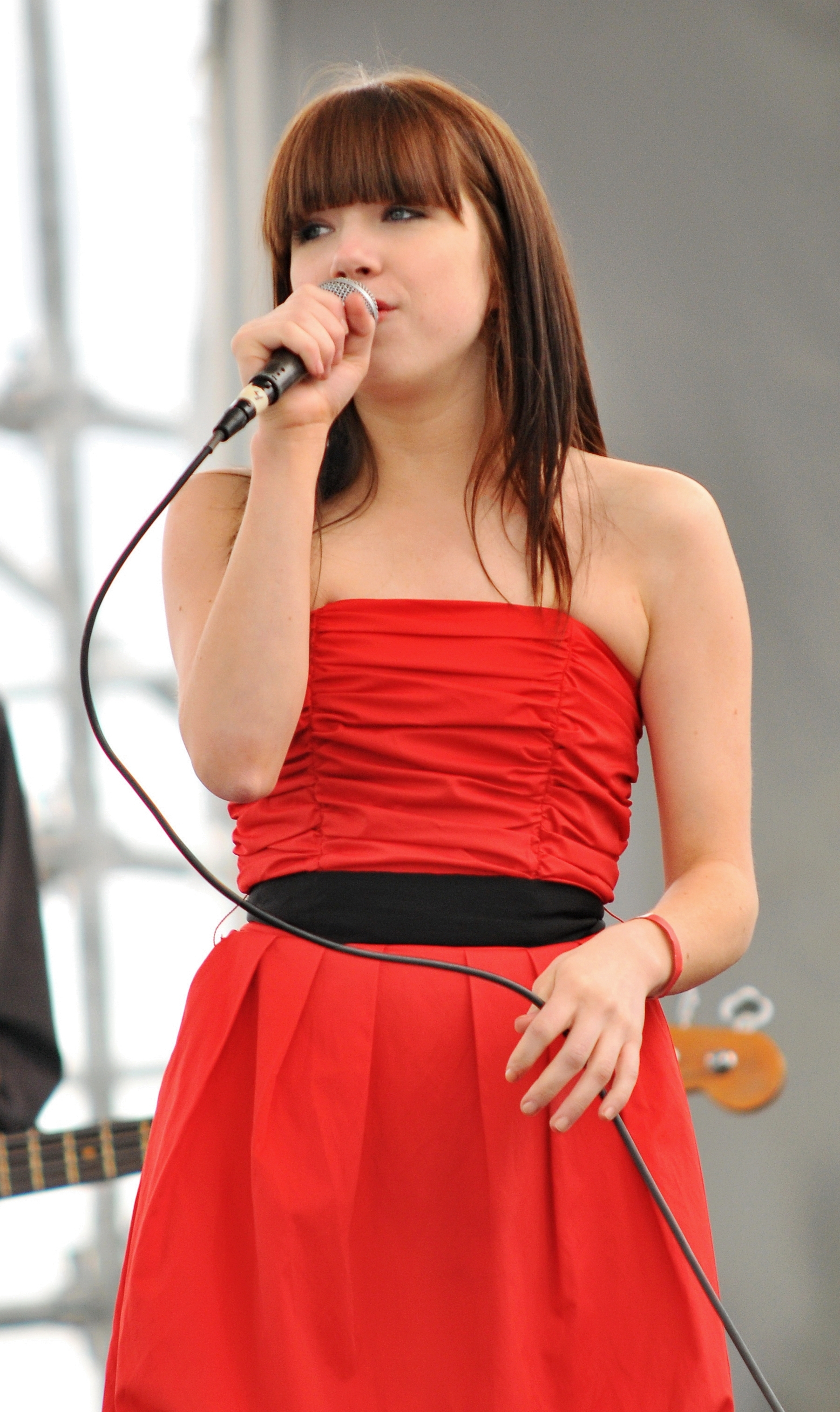
The smash global hit "Call Me Maybe" by Carly Rae Jepsen had its reign of nine consecutive weeks at the top of the Billboard Hot 100 ended by "Whistle".

"Whistle" debuted at number 64 on the Billboard Hot 100 chart. For the week dated August 25, 2012, the song reached number one on the chart, selling 317,000 copies and overtaking Carly Rae Jepsen's "Call Me Maybe", which had been at the top for the preceding nine weeks since June 23, 2012. The following week, however, it was overtaken by Taylor Swift's crossover hit "We Are Never Ever Getting Back Together". On the week of September 8, 2012, "Whistle" once again topped the Billboard Hot 100 for another week, until once again being overtaken by "We Are Never Ever Getting Back Together ." The song has sold 3,372,000 copies in the US as of November 2012.

In Australia, the song debuted at number eight on the ARIA Singles Chart on May 6, 2012. It moved to number one on the chart the next week and it kept the first position for the next seven weeks.

In the United Kingdom, the song debuted and peaked at number two on the UK Singles Chart on June 10, 2012 – for the week ending date June 16, 2012 – beaten to the top of the chart by "Sing" by Gary Barlow & The Commonwealth Band featuring Military Wives. For the same chart issue, it debuted at the top of the UK R&B Chart. According to the Official Charts Company, "Whistle" sold 620,000 copies in the UK, becoming Britain's 15th best-selling song of 2012.

In Ireland, for the chart issue dated May 31, 2012, "Whistle" debuted at number eight on the Irish Singles Chart. For the next two weeks, the song moved to number three on the chart. For the chart issue dated June 22, 2012, "Whistle" moved from number three to number one on the Irish Singles Chart removing Cheryl Cole's "Call My Name" from the top spot of the chart. As of August 14, 2012 the single has sold over 4 million copies around the globe.

== Music video ==
The music video for "Whistle" was directed by Marc Klasfeld and premiered on May 24, 2012, at 4 p.m. EST. A preview of the video was released on May 21, 2012. It was filmed in Acapulco, Mexico. A behind-the-scenes video was released the next day on May 25, 2012. It makes use of split screen at various points. It mostly shows Flo Rida lying on a bed on a beach singing the song.

Hamish Macbain of NME described the video, "The video setting: Flo Rida, topless, head shaved, shorts on, on a cliff edge. Other video personnel: women in bikinis, some allowed to whistle to take Flo Rida’s dream outlined at the beginning of this track one step closer to reality." Becky Bain of Idolator reviewed the video positively, saying: "Flo Rida's thinly-veiled sexual euphimism, 'Whistle', gets exactly the type of video you’d expect: shot in sunny Acalpulco, the ... vid[eo] features boobs, babes, bikinis, and little else. The clip also acts as a video pamphlet for any millionaires out there looking to find the next location for their luxury vacation. Flo Rida and his booty-shakin’ ladies not included, but with an unbelievable setting like this, you can do more than just whistle the night away." A writer of Rap-Up noted that "Water, women, and wild parties rule" with the video and further wrote that viewers will "escape to paradise with Flo". Katherine St Asaph of Popdust gave a mixed review for the video, writing that "it's fitting that the 'Whistle' video is basically an update of 'Wild Ones,' with less Sia and more whistling". However, she praised the landscapes in the video, saying that "This could double as a travel commercial–a commercial for the very idea of travel.".

== In other media ==
On October 12, 2014, A YouTube fan video made for actor Josh Hutcherson using a cover of "Whistle" went viral on TikTok in 2023 after users started posting bait and switch videos in which the viewer is unexpectedly shown the video in various creative situations. It was viewed as a modern-day successor to the Rickroll internet trend.

== Can You Blow My version ==
The week before Flo Rida's version entered the UK Singles Chart, a pre-release cover version by a tribute collective under the name of Can You Blow My, entered the chart at number 55, moving up to number 38 the following week.

== Track listing ==
- Digital download
1. "Whistle" – 3:45
- CD single
1. "Whistle" – 3:48
2. "Wild Ones" (Alex Guesta remix) – 6:59

== Credits and personnel ==
Credits are taken from the liner notes of Wild Ones.

- Flo Rida – songwriter, vocal
- David Glas – songwriter, producer, recording
- Marcus Killian – songwriter
- DJ Frank E – songwriter, producer
- Breyan Isaac – songwriter
- Antonio "Jovii Hendrix" Mobley – songwriter, background vocals
- JP "The Specialist" Negrete – recording
- Manny Marroquin – mixer
- Chris Galland – assistant mixer
- Delbert Bowers – assistant mixer
- Pat Kraus – mastering
- Trent Mazur - guitar

== Charts ==
=== Weekly charts ===
Weekly chart performance
| Chart (2012) | Peak position |
|---|---|
| Australia (ARIA) | 1 |
| Austria (Ö3 Austria Top 40) | 2 |
| Belgium (Ultratop 50 Flanders) | 2 |
| Belgium (Ultratop 50 Wallonia) | 8 |
| Brazil (Billboard Brasil Hot 100) | 1 |
| Brazil Hot Pop Songs | 8 |
| Bulgaria Airplay (BAMP) | 1 |
| Canada Hot 100 (Billboard) | 1 |
| CIS Airplay (TopHit) | 1 |
| Czech Republic Airplay (ČNS IFPI) | 1 |
| Denmark (Tracklisten) | 3 |
| Finland (Suomen virallinen lista) | 3 |
| France (SNEP) | 2 |
| Germany (GfK) | 2 |
| Honduras (Honduras Top 50) | 1 |
| Hungary (Rádiós Top 40) | 1 |
| Hungary (Dance Top 40) | 4 |
| Ireland (IRMA) | 1 |
| Israel International Airplay (Media Forest) | 1 |
| Italy (FIMI) | 3 |
| Italian Airplay (EarOne) | 2 |
| Japan Hot 100 (Billboard) | 27 |
| Lebanon (OLT20) | 2 |
| Luxembourg Digital Song Sales (Billboard) | 1 |
| Mexico (Billboard Mexican Airplay) | 2 |
| Mexico Anglo (Monitor Latino) | 2 |
| Netherlands (Dutch Top 40) | 3 |
| Netherlands (Single Top 100) | 5 |
| New Zealand (Recorded Music NZ) | 1 |
| Norway (VG-lista) | 1 |
| Poland Airplay (ZPAV) | 1 |
| Portugal Digital Song Sales (Billboard) | 1 |
| Romania Airplay (Media Forest) | 5 |
| Russia (2M) | 6 |
| Russia Airplay (TopHit) | 1 |
| Scottish Singles Sales (Official Charts) | 1 |
| Slovakia Airplay (ČNS IFPI) | 1 |
| South Korean International Singles (GAON) | 5 |
| Spain (Promusicae) | 8 |
| Sweden (Sverigetopplistan) | 1 |
| Switzerland (Schweizer Hitparade) | 1 |
| UK Singles (Official Charts) | 2 |
| UK Hip Hop/R&B (Official Charts) | 1 |
| Ukraine Airplay (TopHit) | 1 |
| US Billboard Hot 100 | 1 |
| US Adult Pop Airplay (Billboard) | 25 |
| US Dance Club Songs (Billboard) | 32 |
| US Dance Airplay (Billboard) | 12 |
| US Hot Latin Songs (Billboard) | 30 |
| US Hot Rap Songs (Billboard) | 2 |
| US Pop Airplay (Billboard) | 1 |
| US Rhythmic Airplay (Billboard) | 1 |
| Venezuela Pop Rock General (Record Report) | 1 |

=== Year-end charts ===
Year-end chart performance
| Chart (2012) | Position |
|---|---|
| Australia (ARIA) | 4 |
| Austria (Ö3 Austria Top 40) | 12 |
| Belgium (Ultratop Flanders) | 22 |
| Belgium (Ultratop Wallonia) | 35 |
| Brazil (Crowley) | 25 |
| Canada (Canadian Hot 100) | 14 |
| France (SNEP) | 22 |
| Germany (Media Control AG) | 15 |
| Hungary (Dance Top 40) | 14 |
| Hungary (Rádiós Top 40) | 8 |
| Israel (Media Forest) | 4 |
| Italy (FIMI) | 17 |
| Netherlands (Dutch Top 40) | 20 |
| Netherlands (Single Top 100) | 33 |
| Poland (ZPAV) | 35 |
| Russia Airplay (TopHit) | 8 |
| Spain (PROMUSICAE) | 37 |
| Sweden (Sverigetopplistan) | 9 |
| Switzerland (Schweizer Hitparade) | 7 |
| Ukraine Airplay (TopHit) | 37 |
| UK Singles (OCC) | 15 |
| US Billboard Hot 100 | 17 |
| US Dance/Mix Show Airplay (Billboard) | 48 |
| US Mainstream Top 40 (Billboard) | 29 |
| US Rhythmic (Billboard) | 20 |

Year-end chart performance
| Chart (2013) | Position |
|---|---|
| Russia Airplay (TopHit) | 136 |
| Ukraine Airplay (TopHit) | 112 |

=== Decade-end charts ===
2010s-end chart performance for "Whistle"
| Chart (2010–2019) | Position |
|---|---|
| Australia (ARIA) | 80 |

== Certifications ==
Certifications and sales
| Region | Certification | Certified units/sales |
|---|---|---|
| Australia (ARIA) | 7× Platinum | 490,000^{^} |
| Austria (IFPI Austria) | Platinum | 30,000^{*} |
| Belgium (BRMA) | Gold | 15,000^{*} |
| Canada (Music Canada) | 5× Platinum | 400,000^{*} |
| Denmark (IFPI Danmark) | Gold | 15,000^{^} |
| France (SNEP) | Gold | 75,000^{*} |
| Germany (BVMI) | 5× Gold | 750,000^{‡} |
| Italy (FIMI) | 2× Platinum | 60,000^{*} |
| Mexico (AMPROFON) | Platinum+Gold | 90,000^{*} |
| New Zealand (RMNZ) | 4× Platinum | 120,000^{‡} |
| Spain (Promusicae) | Platinum | 60,000^{‡} |
| Sweden (GLF) | 5× Platinum | 200,000^{‡} |
| Switzerland (IFPI Switzerland) | Platinum | 30,000^{^} |
| United Kingdom (BPI) | 2× Platinum | 1,200,000^{‡} |
| United States (RIAA) | 5× Platinum | 3,372,000 |
Streaming
| Denmark (IFPI Danmark) | 4× Platinum | 7,200,000^{†} |
^{*} Sales figures based on certification alone.^{^} Shipments figures based on certification alone.^{‡} Sales+streaming figures based on certification alone.^{†} Streaming-only figures based on certification alone.

== Radio and release history ==
Release dates for "Whistle"
| Country | Release date | Format(s) | Label |
|---|---|---|---|
| United States | April 24, 2012 | Digital download | Poe Boy Entertainment; Atlantic Records |
| United Kingdom | June 5, 2012 | Digital download | Poe Boy Entertainment; Atlantic Records |
| Germany | June 8, 2012 | CD single | Poe Boy Entertainment; Atlantic Records |
| United States | June 26, 2012 | Mainstream radio airplay | Poe Boy Entertainment; Atlantic Records |
