= Hello Friday =

Single by Flo Rida featuring Jason Derulo

from the EP My House
- Released: February 26, 2016
- Length: 3:21
- Label: International Music Group; Poe Boy; Atlantic
- Songwriters: Tramar Dillard; Daniel Johnson; Justin Davey; Vinay Vyas; Jason Desrouleaux; Jeffrey Vaughn; Steany Wright; Thomas Troelsen
- Producers: Kane Beatz; TODAY

Flo Rida singles chronology
"My House" (2015)	"Hello Friday" (2016)	"Greenlight" (2016)

Jason Derulo singles chronology
"Secret Love Song" (2016)	"Hello Friday" (2016)	"If It Ain't Love" (2016)

"Hello Friday" is a song by American rapper and singer Flo Rida featuring fellow American singer Jason Derulo. The song was released as a standalone single on February 26, 2016, in the United States. Remixes were released on May 6, 2016.

== Music video ==
The official music video directed by Alex Acosta was uploaded to YouTube on April 29, 2016. Natalie La Rose makes a cameo appearance.

== Other media ==
The song was chosen as one of the theme songs for WWE's WrestleMania 32, along with "My House", also by Flo Rida.

== Track listings ==
Digital download

1. "Hello Friday" – 3:21

Digital download – remixes

1. "Hello Friday" (AVNU Remix) – 3:07
2. "Hello Friday" (Owen Norton Remix) – 3:41
3. "Hello Friday" (Khrebto Remix) – 4:11
4. "Hello Friday" (Jawa Remix) – 3:56

== Charts ==
Chart performance for "Hello Friday"
Chart (2016)	Peak position
Australia (ARIA)	36
Slovakia Airplay (ČNS IFPI)	74
Sweden Heatseeker (Sverigetopplistan)	3
UK Singles (OCC)	198
US Billboard Hot 100	79
US Hot Rap Songs (Billboard)	12
