= Wild Ones (Flo Rida song) =

2011 single by Flo Rida

Single by Flo Rida featuring Sia

from the album Wild Ones
- B-side: "Good Feeling" (Carl Tricks Remix)
- Released: December 19, 2011
- Recorded: 2011
- Studio: Atlantic (Los Angeles)
- Genre: Dance-pop; hip house
- Length: 3:53
- Label: Atlantic; Poe Boy
- Songwriters: Tramar Dillard; Sia Furler; Raphaël Judrin; Pierre-Antoine Melki; Axel Hedfors; Jacob Luttrell; Marcus Cooper; Niklaas Vogel-Kern
- Producers: soFLY & Nius; Axwell

Flo Rida singles chronology
"Hangover" (2011)	"Wild Ones" (2011)	"Whistle" (2012)

Sia singles chronology
"Titanium" (2011)	"Wild Ones" (2011)	"She Wolf (Falling to Pieces)" (2012)

Audio sample
- "Wild Ones": file; help

Music video
- "Wild Ones" on YouTube

"Wild Ones" is a song by American rapper Flo Rida featuring Australian singer-songwriter Sia from his fourth studio album of the same name (2012). It was by written by the artists alongside Jacob Luttrell, Marcus Cooper, Niklaas Vogel-Kern, and producers soFLY & Nius and Axwell, while the engineering and recording of the record was handled by Skylar Mones. Lyrically, the song touches on themes including partying, love and dancing while the musical composition is an uptempo dance-pop and hip house song that is influenced by house music and electro house.

It was released on December 19, 2011, as the album's second single and title track. Upon its release, the song was positively received by music critics, specifically Sia's chorus. The single peaked at number one in Australia, Canada, Honduras, New Zealand, and Norway, whilst it peaked inside the top forty in every country chart it charted on. It charted at number five on the US Billboard Hot 100. With over 6.5 million copies sold globally, it is Flo Rida's fourth best selling and one of the top 250 best-selling singles.

The music video was released, featuring Flo Rida having fun with his friends. Sia, however, was not featured in the final video. This song along with "Good Feeling" was selected to serve as one of the official theme songs to WrestleMania XXVIII and it was also featured in The Rock's Road to WrestleMania vignettes where he prepares for his match with John Cena at the event. Flo Rida performed the songs "Good Feeling" and "Wild Ones" live at the event to precede Rock's entrance for the match. The WrestleMania XXVIII version, which had different lyrics for the second verse, focusing on The Rock, was also featured in the WWE 2K15 soundtrack.

== Background ==
The "Titanium" project got Australian singer-songwriter Sia into Guetta's powerful inner circle, including Atlantic Records director of A&R Ben Maddahi, who then introduced Sia to Flo Rida and his team, yielding "Wild Ones". The song, with Sia as the featured artist, serves as the second official single from Rida's album of the same name.

Sia originally wrote the chorus and music to the song in 15 minutes for Katy Perry, who never received the song; additional lyrical contributions were made by Rida, Jacob Luttrell, Marcus Cooper, Benjamin Maddahi and the song's producers soFLY & Nius and Axwell.

Sia later said: "They asked me to record ["Wild Ones"] over and over for almost six months. Eventually I said, 'OK, but don't put my name on it.' I was angry because we had already had this discussion. Jonathan [Daniel, Sia's manager] said to me, 'I don't think I really believed you that you didn't want to be credited or get the recognition you deserve.'"

== Composition ==
"Wild Ones" is an up-tempo dance-pop song that includes influences of house music and electro house. According to Bill Lamb from About.com, "There is clearly a well worn formula to Flo Rida's blend of hip hop, dance, and pop. [...] he has not worn out his welcome. It is the moments when "Wild Ones" breaks down into that simple combination of synth keyboards and Sia's voice that the song commands our attention." David Jeffries from Allmusic compared the song to Katy Perry's "Firework", which was released one year previous, saying "The title cut [Wild Ones] with [Sia] is close to Katy Perry's "Fireworks" but crafted to support a sports highlight reel instead of teenage dreams [...]"

"Wild Ones" is written and composed in the key of A ♭ major, it is built of the chord progression A ♭-Cm-Fm-D ♭ and is set in time signature of common time with a tempo of 127 beats per minute. Sia's vocal range spans from E ♭ _{4} to C _{5}

== Critical reception ==
Billboard described Sia's voice as a "bell-clear, campfire-warm voice [that] has mostly been applied to her own elegantly quirky creations". DJBooth.com compared the song to "Good Feeling", stating that it is a "slightly more subdued, but equally dancefloor/radio-ready follow-up". Tim Byron from The Vine stated, "When [Sia] sings the chorus, phrases like 'I heard' and 'if I took you home' speak of uncertainty. She likes the idea of wildness, but isn't certain how it will go. Flo Rida's role in the song is to convince her that she actually does want to be a wild one, to convince her that it is okay to let go, to obliterate herself."

The song was nominated to the Grammy Award for Best Rap/Sung Collaboration at the 55th Annual Grammy Awards.

== Commercial reception ==
=== Chart performance ===
The song made its debut at number twelve on the New Zealand Singles Chart. In its second week, it entered the top ten on ten, and in its third week it peaked atop of the charts. It became Flo Rida's second number-one single in that country and Sia's first number-one. The song was certified Gold in its first month and eventually received double platinum in May 2012, staying in the charts for twenty-two weeks. In Sia's native Australia, it debuted at twenty-nine. In its third week, it rose to number two and eventually peaked at one for six consecutive weeks, pushing Foster The People's single "Pumped Up Kicks" off the top spot. It became Sia's first number-one, while it was Flo Rida's third number-one. The song received septuple platinum in Australia, selling over 500,000 copies there and had over five songs that received certifications in one year.

In France, the song debuted at seventy-six. Despite a slow start, it eventually peaked at number eleven on the chart, being one position off the top ten. The song debuted at twenty-nine on the Swedish Singles Chart, during the New Year's Day week. The song eventually peaked at number three on the chart and was certified quintuple platinum by the IFPI, selling over 200,000 copies and is the eighty-third best-selling single in that country. In Norway, the song entered at fifteen on their native singles chart and eventually peaked at number one in its fifth week, and in total, spent twenty-one weeks on the chart.

"Wild Ones" made its official debut at number fifty-seven on the US Billboard Hot 100. The single eventually peaked at number five on the chart, and stayed for thirty-six weeks on the chart, making it Flo Rida's third-longest charting single, just behind "Low" and "Good Feeling". The song also achieved success on its component charts, peaking at two on the Mainstream Top 40, eight on the Rap Songs and thirty on the Hot Dance Club Songs. It was certified triple platinum by Recording Industry Association of America (RIAA), with over 3,000,000 sales sold there. In the United Kingdom, the song peaked at number four on their singles chart after debuting at number four. It sold 695,000 copies in the UK in 2012, making it the 10th best-selling single of 2012.

=== Year-end charts ===
In New Zealand, the song was the sixth best-selling single of 2012, while his then-next single "Whistle" was the fifth best selling single that same year. In Canada, the song was the eighth best-selling single of 2012, while in the United Kingdom, it was the tenth best selling single. In the United States, the song was the eleventh top-selling single according to Billboard. As of December 2012, the song has sold 3,444,000 digital copies in the United States and 6.5 million copies worldwide.

As with the sales of Flo Rida's "Wild Ones" and his other singles; "Low" (6,786,026), "Right Round" (5,475,096), "Good Feeling" (3,903,872), "Whistle" (3,791,107) and "Club Can't Handle Me" (3,079,302), the sales all tally over 26 million sales worldwide, making him the best selling rapper in the digital music era.

== Music video ==
The video directed by Erik White was released on February 9, 2012, showing Flo Rida partying in Dubai and Miami. In Dubai, it shows the Infinity Tower, Burj Al Arab, and Palm Jumeirah. While the song features Sia, she does not appear in the video. Sia's vocals were lipsynced by Analicia Chaves. The video also features Cuban model Dayami Padron on the boat scenes to the left of Flo Rida.

== Live performances and other appearances ==
Flo Rida performed the song on the finale of second season of The Voice with contestant Juliet Simms singing the chorus. He also performed the song with Carly Rae Jepsen at the 2012 MuchMusic Video Awards, with Stayc Reigns at the 2012 Teen Choice Awards, the 2012 Premios Juventud, with Jana Kramer at WrestleMania XXVIII prior to The Rock's entrance for his "Once in a Lifetime" match against John Cena, and with Bebe Rexha at the 2016 Teen Choice Awards. He released a Coke Studio Fusion Mix featuring Myriam Fares on May 30, 2013. He performed a mash-up of this song along with two more of his famous songs on July 21, 2014, on WWE RAW MIAMI. It also appeared in the trailer of Kung Fu Panda 3.

== Wild One Two ==
"Wild One Two"

Single by Jack Back featuring David Guetta, Nicky Romero and Sia

from the album Nothing but the Beat 2.0
- B-side: "Wild One Two" (Jaywalker Remix)
- Released: February 14, 2012
- Recorded: 2011
- Studio: Atlantic (Los Angeles)
- Genre: Dance-pop; electro house; progressive house
- Length: 5:47; 3:09 (radio edit)
- Label: Big Beat
- Songwriters: Flo Rida; soFLY & Nius; Sia; Axwell; Jacob Luttrell; Marcus Cooper; Benjamin Maddahi
- Producers: David Guetta; Nicky Romero (additional)

David Guetta singles chronology
"Turn Me On" (2011)	"Wild One Two" (2012)	"The Alphabeat" (2012)

Nicky Romero singles chronology
"Toulouse" (2011)	"Wild One Two" (2012)	"Like Home" (2012)

A remix version entitled "Wild One Two" by Jack Back featuring David Guetta, Nicky Romero and Sia was released on February 14, 2012. An edited version of the song appears in the 2012 re-release of Guetta's album Nothing but the Beat 2.0.

== Track listing ==
Digital download
No.	Title	Length
1.	"Wild Ones"	3:53

CD single
No.	Title	Length
1.	"Wild Ones"	3:53
2.	"Good Feeling" (Carl Tricks Remix)	5:38

Digital download - Wild One Two
No.	Title	Length
1.	"Wild One Two"	5:47

Digital download - Wild One Two (Remixes)
No.	Title	Length
1.	"Wild One Two"	5:47
2.	"Wild One Two" (NO_ID Remix)	5:28
3.	"Wild One Two" (Disfunktion Remix)	7:31
4.	"Wild One Two" (Jaywalker Remix)	5:32

CD single - Wild One Two
No.	Title	Length
1.	"Wild One Two"	5:47
2.	"Wild One Two" (Jaywalker Remix)	6:18

== Charts ==
=== Weekly charts ===
Chart (2012)	Peak position
Australia (ARIA)	1
Austria (Ö3 Austria Top 40)	2
Belgium (Ultratop 50 Flanders)	8
Belgium (Ultratop 50 Wallonia)	13
Brazil (Billboard Brasil Hot 100)	46
Brazil Hot Pop Songs	17
Canada Hot 100 (Billboard)	1
Canada CHR/Top 40 (Billboard)	2
Canada Hot AC (Billboard)	5
Czech Republic Airplay (ČNS IFPI)	13
Denmark (Tracklisten)	11
Finland (Suomen virallinen lista)	6
France (SNEP)	11
Germany (GfK)	6
Honduras (Honduras Top 50)	1
Hungary (Dance Top 40)	5
Hungary (Rádiós Top 40)	1
Ireland (IRMA)	3
Israel (Media Forest)	3
Italian Airplay (EarOne)	96
Japan Hot 100 (Billboard)	95
Lebanon (OLT20)	2
Luxembourg (Billboard)	4
Mexico Top Inglés (Monitor Latino)	4
Mexico (Billboard Mexican Airplay)	7
Mexico Anglo (Monitor Latino)	3
Netherlands (Dutch Top 40)	7
Netherlands (Single Top 100)	15
New Zealand (Recorded Music NZ)	1
Norway (VG-lista)	1
Russia Airplay (TopHit)	31
Poland Airplay (ZPAV)	2
Portugal (Billboard)	7
Romania (Romanian Top 100)	13
Scottish Singles Sales (Official Charts)	4
Slovakia Airplay (ČNS IFPI)	3
South Korea International Singles (Gaon)	10
Spain (Promusicae)	23
Sweden (Sverigetopplistan)	3
Switzerland (Schweizer Hitparade)	3
UK Hip-Hop/R&B (Official Charts)	1
UK Singles (Official Charts)	4
Ukraine Airplay (TopHit)	26
US Billboard Hot 100	5
US Adult Pop Airplay (Billboard)	18
US Dance Club Songs (Billboard)	30
US Hot Latin Songs (Billboard)	32
US Hot R&B/Hip-Hop Songs (Billboard)	82
US Hot Rap Songs (Billboard)	8
US Pop Airplay (Billboard)	2
US Rhythmic Airplay (Billboard)	1
Venezuela Pop Rock General (Record Report)	8

=== Year-end charts ===
Chart (2012)	Position
Australia (ARIA)	5
Austria (Ö3 Austria Top 40)	22
Belgium (Ultratop Flanders)	47
Belgium (Ultratop Wallonia)	74
Brazil (Crowley)	49
Canada (Canadian Hot 100)	8
France (SNEP)	73
Germany (Media Control AG)	47
Hungary (Dance Top 40)	32
Hungary (Rádiós Top 40)	26
Netherlands (Dutch Top 40)	26
Netherlands (Single Top 100)	53
Poland (ZPAV)	38
Russia Airplay (TopHit)	130
Sweden (Sverigetopplistan)	16
Switzerland (Schweizer Hitparade)	50
Ukraine Airplay (TopHit)	170
UK Singles (Official Charts Company)	10
US Billboard Hot 100	11
US Pop Songs	17
US Rhythmic Songs	11
US Billboard Hot Dance Club Songs ("Wild One Two")	13

=== Decade-end charts ===
Chart (2010–2019)	Position
Australia (ARIA)	78

== Certifications ==
Region	Certification	Certified units/sales
Australia (ARIA)	7× Platinum	490,000^{^}
Austria (IFPI Austria)	Platinum	30,000^{*}
Canada (Music Canada)	5× Platinum	400,000^{*}
Denmark (IFPI Danmark)	Gold	15,000^{^}
Germany (BVMI)	Platinum	600,000^{‡}
Italy (FIMI)	Gold	15,000^{*}
Mexico (AMPROFON)	Platinum	60,000^{*}
New Zealand (RMNZ)	6× Platinum	180,000^{‡}
Spain (Promusicae)	Gold	30,000^{‡}
Sweden (GLF)	5× Platinum	200,000^{‡}
Switzerland (IFPI Switzerland)	Platinum	30,000^{^}
United Kingdom (BPI)	3× Platinum	1,800,000^{‡}
United States (RIAA)	5× Platinum	5,000,000
Streaming
Denmark (IFPI Danmark)	3× Platinum	5,400,000^{†}
^{*} Sales figures based on certification alone.^{^} Shipments figures based on certification alone.^{‡} Sales+streaming figures based on certification alone.^{†} Streaming-only figures based on certification alone.

== Release history ==
Country	Release date	Format(s)	Label
Worldwide	December 19, 2011	—	Atlantic Records
United States	January 9, 2012	Digital download	Atlantic Records; Poe Boy Entertainment
United Kingdom	January 23, 2012	Digital download	Atlantic Records
Europe	February 13, 2012	CD single ("Wild One Two" remix)	Warner Records
Germany	February 17, 2012	CD single	Atlantic Records

== See also ==
- List of number-one dance singles of 2012 (U.S.)
