= Step Up Revolution: Music from the Motion Picture =

Step Up Revolution (Music from the Motion Picture)

Soundtrack album by Various Artists
- Released: July 17, 2012
- Recorded: 2011–2012
- Genres: Dance; hip hop; R&B; dancehall; dubstep
- Length: 54:00
- Label: Interscope

Singles from Step Up Revolution: Music from the Motion Picture
- 1. "Goin' In" Released: June 8, 2012; 2. "Hands in the Air" Released: July 6, 2012; 3. "Feel Alive" Released: July 17, 2012

Professional ratings
Review scores
Source	Rating
Allmusic	3.5/5 stars

Step Up Revolution (Music from the Motion Picture) is the soundtrack to the 2012 film Step Up Revolution. The album was released on July 17, 2012. The album features a collection of tracks by various artists, and spawned exclusive singles from Jennifer Lopez, Fergie, and Timbaland, as well as featuring remixes of some of the year's hottest tracks. The album was released in the United Kingdom under the title Step Up 4: Miami Heat – Music from the Motion Picture. The album peaked at number #15 on the Canadian Albums Chart.

== Track listing ==
No.	Title	Artist(s)	Length
1.	"Let's Go" (Ricky Luna Remix)	Travis Barker featuring Yelawolf, Twista, Busta Rhymes & Lil Jon	3:45
2.	"Live My Life" (Party Rock Remix)	Far East Movement featuring Justin Bieber & Redfoo	4:14
3.	"Hands in the Air"	Timbaland featuring Ne-Yo	4:00
4.	"Bad Girls" (Nick Thayer Remix)	M.I.A. featuring Missy Elliott & Rye Rye	4:37
5.	"Get Loose"	Sohanny and Vein	3:16
6.	"Feel Alive" (Revolution Remix)	Fergie featuring Pitbull & DJ Poet	4:07
7.	"U Don’t Like Me" (Datsik Remix)	Diplo featuring Lil Jon	4:43
8.	"This Is the Life"	My Name Is Kay	3:48
9.	"Bring It Back"	Travis Porter	3:45
10.	"Goin' In"	Jennifer Lopez featuring Flo Rida	4:08
11.	"Dance Without You" (Ricky Luna Remix)	Skylar Grey	3:13
12.	"I Don't Like You" (Nick Thayer Remix)	Eva Simons	4:24
13.	"To Build a Home"	The Cinematic Orchestra	6:09

== Charts ==
Chart (2012)	Peak position
Australian Albums Chart	28
Austrian Albums Chart	7
Belgian Album Chart (Flanders)	12
Belgian Album Chart (Wallonia)	10
Canadian Albums Chart	15
Dutch Albums Chart	62
France Albums Chart	143
German Albums Chart	27
New Zealand Albums Chart	37
Swiss Albums Chart	11
US Billboard 200	52
US Billboard Top Soundtracks	3
