= Good Feeling (song) =

2011 single by Flo Rida

Single by Flo Rida

from the album Wild Ones
- Released: August 29, 2011
- Recorded: 2011
- Genre: Hip house; complextro; dance
- Length: 4:07
- Label: Atlantic; Poe Boy
- Songwriters: Etta James; Flo Rida; Tim Bergling; Arash Pournouri; Breyan Isaac; Cirkut; Leroy Kirkland; Dr. Luke; Pearl Woods
- Producers: Dr. Luke; Cirkut

Flo Rida singles chronology
"Club Rocker" (2011)	"Good Feeling" (2011)	"Hangover" (2011)

Music video
- "Good Feeling" on YouTube

"Good Feeling" is a song by American rapper Flo Rida from his 2012 EP of the same name, also appearing on his fourth studio album, Wild Ones. It was released as the album's lead single on August 29, 2011, in the United States. The song was written by Flo Rida, Dr. Luke, Cirkut, Breyan Isaac, Arash Pournouri, Avicii (credited to his real name Tim Bergling), Etta James, Leroy Kirkland and Pearl Woods. It was also produced by Dr. Luke and Cirkut.

The song contains a sample from the 2011 song "Levels" by Avicii, which in turn samples the 1962 song "Something's Got a Hold on Me" by Etta James. As a result, James, Kirkland, Woods, Avicii and Pournouri received writing credits. The song is Flo Rida's fourth collaboration with Dr. Luke (after "Right Round", "Touch Me" and "Who Dat Girl") and first collaboration with Cirkut. The three would next collaborate with Taio Cruz on the song "Hangover".

"Good Feeling" peaked at number 3 on the Billboard Hot 100, becoming Flo Rida's sixth top-ten and fourth top-five single on the chart. The song became a top ten hit in 16 countries.

== Background and composition ==
"It's legendary, we got Etta James featured on there, so it's crazy."

— Flo Rida

"Good Feeling" is the lead single from Flo Rida's fourth album Wild Ones. Dr. Luke previously produced Flo Rida's songs "Right Round", "Touch Me" and "Who Dat Girl"; Cirkut previously teamed with Flo Rida on the latter song as well. "Good Feeling" features acoustic-driven guitars, computerized beats and charging keyboards over a prominent sample from Avicii's song "Levels", which in turn samples Etta James's 1962 gospel-tinged hit "Something’s Got a Hold on Me". Following James's death on January 20, 2012, Flo Rida dedicated the song in her memory.

An alternate version featuring vocals from Alice Tan Ridley covering the Etta James sample (known as the 'Alice version') was used in various movies from the time, such as Diary of a Wimpy Kid: Dog Days and a trailer for Wreck-It Ralph. It is theorised that this version exists so the licensing fee for the sample didn't have to be paid.

== Critical reception ==
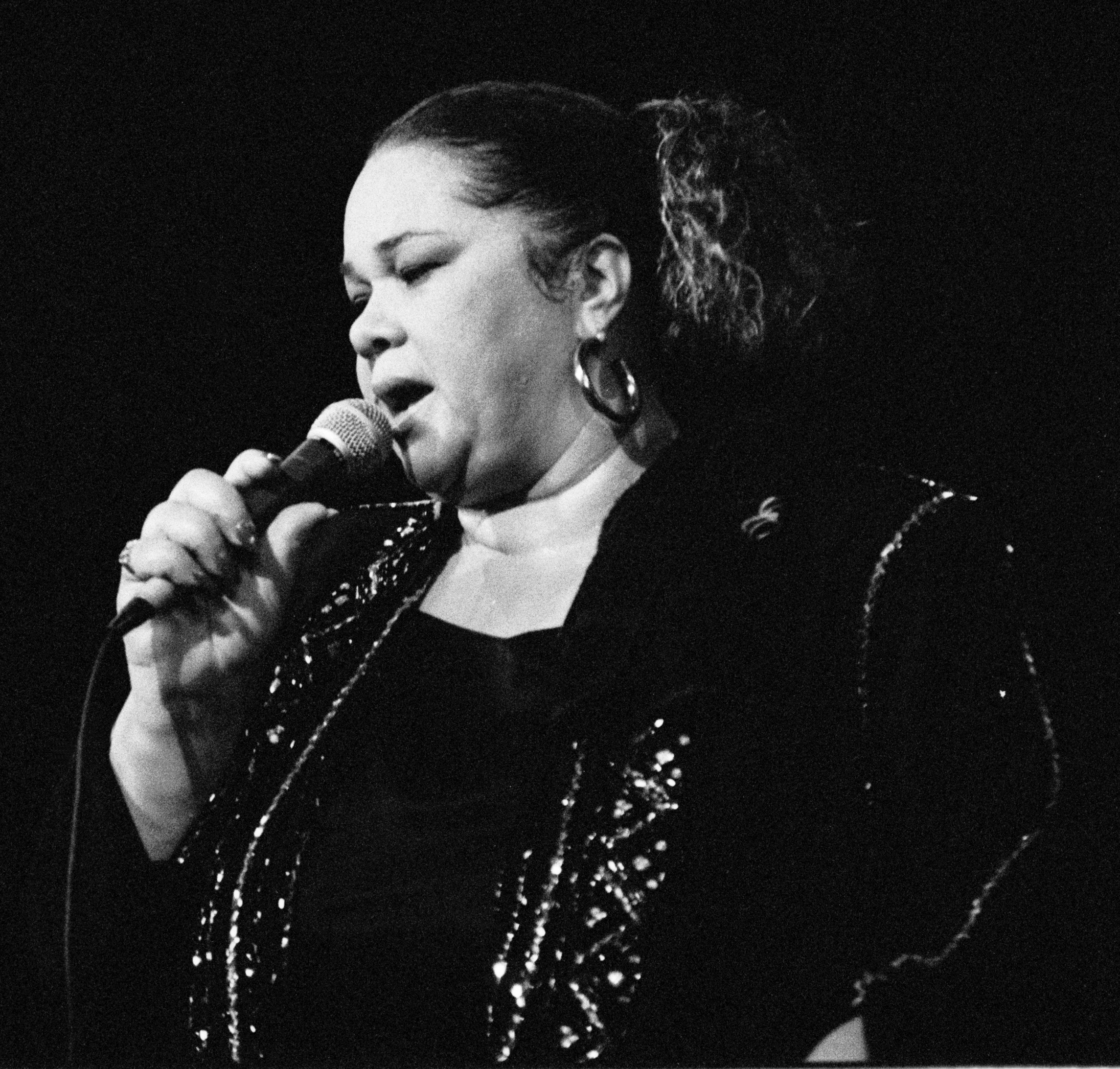
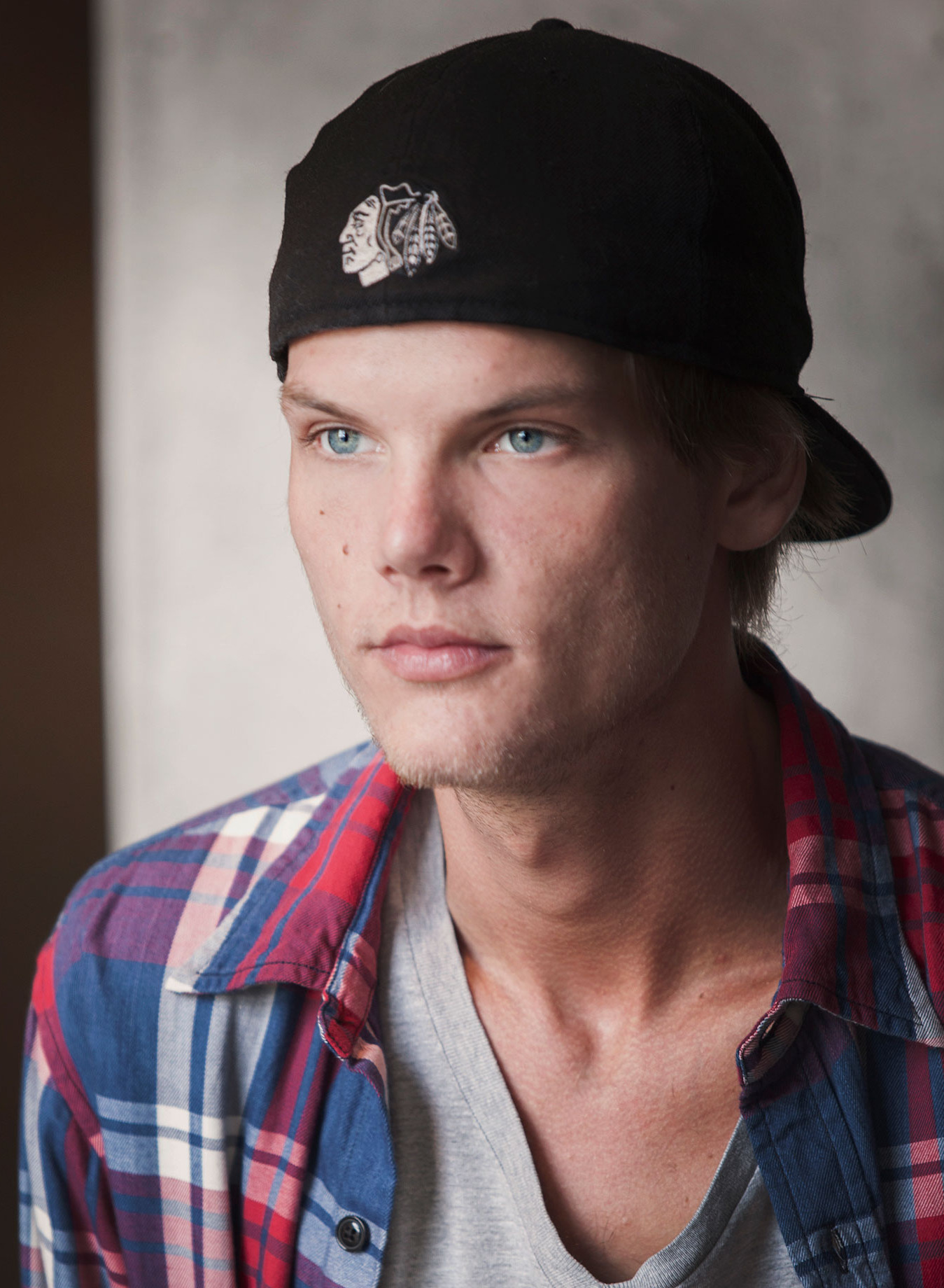
American soul singer Etta James' (left) song "Something's Got a Hold on Me" is sampled on the track via the sample of Swedish DJ Avicii's (right) song "Levels".

The song has received mixed to positive reviews from music critics. Trent Fitzgerald of "Pop Crush" gave the song four stars (out of possible five), writing that "the song is certainly destined to be a dance floor burner". The reviewer also said that "We have a good feeling that Flo Rida has a chart-topping hit on his hands with this club banger. It feels like an anthem for the fist-pumping crowd that idolizes MTV's Guido-ville show The Jersey Shore." In a more favorable review, Katherine St Asaph of Pop Dust wrote that the track "might be the most listenable Flo Rida track ever" and that it's "pretty damn good". In a more negative review, Digital Spy's Robert Copsey rated it two stars (out of possible five) and wrote that "the sampling of DJ Avicii's 'Levels' – which in turn samples Etta James's 'Something's Got a Hold on Me' – makes this club-rap number sound about as authentic as Asda's tinned spaghetti."

== Chart and sales performance ==
"Good Feeling" debuted on the Billboard Hot 100 at No. 82 in its first week of release, and peaked at No. 3 in its 16th week on the Hot 100 in January 2012. It reached 3 million in sales by April 2012, and has sold over 4 million in the U.S. as of March 2014.

In the UK, "Good Feeling" reached No. 1 in the UK Singles Chart in January 2012 eight weeks after release. It became Flo Rida's fourth No. 1 in the UK with sales of 51,000 that week. The song has sold 1,200,000 copies in the UK as of December 2020.

== Music video ==
A lyric video was uploaded to Flo Rida's YouTube channel on August 29, 2011. He shot the music video on September 27, 2011, and it was then later officially released to YouTube on October 21, 2011.

The music video for "Good Feeling" follows Flo Rida on a tour around Europe. A lot of his exercise regimen can be seen in detail. American rap artist Snoop Dogg can be seen in this video shaking hands with Flo Rida during a Marseille show.

It also shows Flo Rida holding an Apple iPad in front of his face. He also rides a 'Tron Bike', created by Parker Brothers.

== In popular culture ==
A cover version of the song was featured in an advert for British travel company First Choice in late 2011 promoting all inclusive holidays.

For the 2011–12 and 2012–13 seasons, "Good Feeling" was the unofficial victory song of the National Hockey League's New York Rangers. The song was played after every Rangers home win at Madison Square Garden until it was replaced with "Wake Me Up", also by the song's producer, for the 2013–14 season.

It was the official theme song of WWE PPVs Survivor Series 2011 and WrestleMania XXVIII (the latter alongside Wild Ones from the same album).

== Track listing ==
- CD single
1. "Good Feeling" – 4:06
2. "Good Feeling" (Jaywalker Remix) – 4:51
- Digital download
1. "Good Feeling" – 4:06
- Digital download — remixes
1. "Good Feeling" – 4:06
2. "Good Feeling" (Bingo Players Remix) – 5:33
3. "Good Feeling" (Hook N Sling Remix) – 6:15
4. "Good Feeling" (Carl Tricks Remix) – 5:40
5. "Good Feeling" (Sick Individuals Remix) – 6:18
6. "Good Feeling" (Jaywalker Remix) – 4:51
7. "Good Feeling" (J.O.B. Remix) – 5:50
8. "Good Feeling" (Seductive Remix) – 4:45

== Charts ==
=== Weekly charts ===
Weekly chart performance for "Good Feeling"
Chart (2011–2012)	Peak position
Australia (ARIA)	4
Austria (Ö3 Austria Top 40)	1
Belgium (Ultratop 50 Flanders)	10
Belgium (Ultratop 50 Wallonia)	4
Brazil Hot 100 Airplay (Billboard Brasil)	21
Canada Hot 100 (Billboard)	2
CIS Airplay (TopHit)	10
Czech Republic Airplay (ČNS IFPI)	5
Denmark (Tracklisten)	14
Finland (Suomen virallinen lista)	7
France (SNEP)	3
Germany (GfK)	1
Hungary (Rádiós Top 40)	2
Hungary (Dance Top 40)	2
Ireland (IRMA)	1
Israel International Airplay (Media Forest)	2
Japan Hot 100 (Billboard)	36
Lebanon (Lebanese Top 20)	2
Luxembourg (Billboard)	4
Mexico Airplay (Billboard)	5
Netherlands (Single Top 100)	69
New Zealand (Recorded Music NZ)	5
Norway (VG-lista)	7
Poland (Dance Top 50)	29
Romania (Romanian Top 100)	5
Russia Airplay (TopHit)	9
Scottish Singles Sales (Official Charts)	1
Slovakia Airplay (ČNS IFPI)	18
South Korea International (Gaon)	95
Spain (Promusicae)	11
Sweden (Sverigetopplistan)	4
Switzerland (Schweizer Hitparade)	3
Ukraine Airplay (TopHit)	148
UK Singles (Official Charts)	1
UK Hip Hop/R&B (Official Charts)	1
US Billboard Hot 100	3
US Adult Pop Airplay (Billboard)	19
US Dance Airplay (Billboard)	2
US Dance Club Songs (Billboard)	32
US Hot Latin Songs (Billboard)	8
US Hot R&B/Hip-Hop Songs (Billboard)	80
US Hot Rap Songs (Billboard)	8
US Pop Airplay (Billboard)	1
US Rhythmic Airplay (Billboard)	1
Venezuela Pop Rock General Airplay (Record Report)	3

=== Year-end charts ===
2011 year-end chart performance for "Good Feeling"
Chart (2011)	Position
Australia (ARIA)	20
Austria (Ö3 Austria Top 40)	56
Canada (Canadian Hot 100)	75
Germany (Media Control AG)	43
Hungary (Rádiós Top 40)	62
New Zealand (RIANZ)	19
Russia Airplay (TopHit)	143
Sweden (Sverigetopplistan)	30
Switzerland (Schweizer Hitparade)	74
UK Singles (Official Charts Company)	48

2012 year-end chart performance for "Good Feeling"
Chart (2012)	Position
Australia (ARIA)	75
Austria (Ö3 Austria Top 40)	28
Belgium (Ultratop Flanders)	93
Belgium (Ultratop Wallonia)	82
Brazil (Crowley)	91
Canada (Canadian Hot 100)	11
France (SNEP)	70
Germany (Media Control AG)	58
Hungary (Rádiós Top 40)	74
Poland (ZPAV)	39
Russia Airplay (TopHit)	155
Sweden (Sverigetopplistan)	70
Switzerland (Schweizer Hitparade)	33
UK Singles (Official Charts Company)	47
US Billboard Hot 100	16
US Dance/Mix Show Airplay (Billboard)	17
US Hot Latin Songs (Billboard)	68
US Mainstream Top 40 (Billboard)	6
US Rhythmic (Billboard)	7

=== All-time charts ===
All-time chart performance for "Good Feeling"
Chart (1992–2017)	Position
US Mainstream Top 40 (Billboard)	64

== Certifications ==
Certifications and sales for "Good Feeling"
Region	Certification	Certified units/sales
Australia (ARIA)	6× Platinum	420,000^{‡}
Austria (IFPI Austria)	Platinum	30,000^{*}
Belgium (BRMA)	Gold	15,000^{*}
Canada (Music Canada)	5× Platinum	400,000^{*}
Denmark (IFPI Danmark)	Gold	15,000^{^}
France (SNEP)	Gold	150,000^{*}
Germany (BVMI)	Platinum	300,000^{^}
Italy (FIMI)	Platinum	50,000^{‡}
Mexico (AMPROFON)	Platinum+Gold	90,000^{*}
New Zealand (RMNZ)	3× Platinum	45,000^{*}
Spain (Promusicae)	Gold	30,000^{‡}
Sweden (GLF)	4× Platinum	160,000^{‡}
Switzerland (IFPI Switzerland)	2× Platinum	60,000^{^}
United Kingdom (BPI)	2× Platinum	1,200,000^{‡}
United States (RIAA)	5× Platinum	5,000,000^{‡}
Streaming
Denmark (IFPI Danmark)	2× Platinum	1,800,000^{†}
^{*} Sales figures based on certification alone.^{^} Shipments figures based on certification alone.^{‡} Sales+streaming figures based on certification alone.^{†} Streaming-only figures based on certification alone.

== Release history ==
Release dates for "Good Feeling"
Country	Release date	Format(s)	Label
United States	August 29, 2011	Digital download	Atlantic Records; Poe Boy Entertainment
Germany	August 29, 2011	Digital download	Atlantic Records; Poe Boy Entertainment; Warner Music
Germany	November 11, 2011	CD single	Atlantic Records; Poe Boy Entertainment; Warner Music
United Kingdom	November 13, 2011	Digital download	Atlantic Records; Poe Boy Entertainment

== See also ==
- List of number-one hits of 2011 (Austria)
- List of number-one hits of 2011 (Germany)
- List of number-one singles of 2012 (Ireland)
- List of UK Singles Chart number ones of the 2010s § 2012
- List of UK R&B Chart number-one singles of 2011
- List of UK R&B Chart number-one singles of 2012
