= Antonio Mobley =

American music producer

Antonio Clarence Mobley, otherwise known as Jovii Hendrix, is an American music producer, vocalist, songwriter, and multi-instrumentalist. He is best known for supplying his pen and background vocals to the Billboard Hot 100 #1 hit, "Whistle", by Flo Rida and being the lead singer of the group, Nine20. The Georgia native has produced for Ray-J, Brisco, Nivea, Lyrica Anderson, Silk, and Ghetto Mafia. He has also worked with Jennifer Lopez, Far East Movement, Lil Wayne, Gerald Levert, and K-Ci & Jojo.
