= List of number-one hits of 2018 (Austria) =

This is a list of the Austrian number-one singles and albums of 2018 as compiled by Ö3 Austria Top 40, the official chart provider of Austria.

| Issue date | Song | Artist | Album | Artist |
|---|---|---|---|---|
| 5 January | "Was du Liebe nennst" | Bausa | ÷ | Ed Sheeran |
| 12 January | "Was du Liebe nennst" | Bausa | Die grössten Party Hits – Volume IX | Die Grubertaler |
| 19 January | "Was du Liebe nennst" | Bausa | Neujahrskonzert 2018 – New Year's Concert | Vienna Philharmonic and Riccardo Muti |
| 26 January | "Was du Liebe nennst" | Bausa | Neujahrskonzert 2018 – New Year's Concert | Vienna Philharmonic and Riccardo Muti |
| 2 February | "River" | Eminem featuring Ed Sheeran | Neujahrskonzert 2018 – New Year's Concert | Vienna Philharmonic and Riccardo Muti |
| 9 February | "River" | Eminem featuring Ed Sheeran | PartyKracher – Die grössten Hits der JuZis | Die Jungen Zillertaler |
| 16 February | "Échame la Culpa" | Luis Fonsi and Demi Lovato | Falco Coming Home: The Tribute Donauinselfest 2017 | Falco |
| 23 February | "These Days" | Rudimental featuring Jess Glynne, Macklemore and Dan Caplen | Fifty Shades Freed: Original Motion Picture Soundtrack | Various artists |
| 2 March | "These Days" | Rudimental featuring Jess Glynne, Macklemore and Dan Caplen | Helene Fischer | Helene Fischer |
| 9 March | "These Days" | Rudimental featuring Jess Glynne, Macklemore and Dan Caplen | Wahre Liebe | Simone & Charly Brunner |
| 16 March | "These Days" | Rudimental featuring Jess Glynne, Macklemore and Dan Caplen | Rolexesh | Olexesh |
| 23 March | "These Days" | Rudimental featuring Jess Glynne, Macklemore and Dan Caplen | Das Beste von Fantasy – Das große Jubiläumsalbum mit allen Hits! | Fantasy |
| 30 March | "These Days" | Rudimental featuring Jess Glynne, Macklemore and Dan Caplen | Rivalen und Rebellen | Frei.Wild |
| 6 April | "These Days" | Rudimental featuring Jess Glynne, Macklemore and Dan Caplen | Das Beste von Fantasy – Das große Jubiläumsalbum mit allen Hits! | Fantasy |
| 13 April | "Friends" | Marshmello and Anne-Marie | Fast Life | Azet |
| 20 April | "Dicke Lippen" | Katja Krasavice | America | Thirty Seconds to Mars |
| 27 April | "Friends" | Marshmello and Anne-Marie | 808 | Ufo361 |
| 4 May | "Maserati" | RAF Camora | Laut und... | Marc Pircher |
| 11 May | "Neymar" | Capital Bra featuring Ufo361 | Helene Fischer | Helene Fischer |
| 18 May | "Neymar" | Capital Bra featuring Ufo361 | 25 Jahre – Owa heit do gemma feiern | Die Ediseer |
| 25 May | "Nobody but You" | Cesár Sampson | Erde & Knochen | Kontra K |
| 1 June | "One Kiss" | Calvin Harris and Dua Lipa | And Justice for None | Five Finger Death Punch |
| 8 June | "One Night Stand" | Capital Bra | Shawn Mendes | Shawn Mendes |
| 15 June | "One Kiss" | Calvin Harris and Dua Lipa | Vergiss mein nicht | Andreas Gabalier |
| 22 June | "Berlin lebt" | Capital Bra | Vergiss mein nicht | Andreas Gabalier |
| 29 June | "Nevermind" | Dennis Lloyd | Vergiss mein nicht | Andreas Gabalier |
| 6 July | "Solo" | Clean Bandit featuring Demi Lovato | Berlin lebt | Capital Bra |
| 13 July | "Solo" | Clean Bandit featuring Demi Lovato | Berlin lebt | Capital Bra |
| 20 July | "Für euch alle" | Bushido featuring Samra and Capital Bra | Obercool im Haifischpool | Die jungen Zillertaler |
| 27 July | "Solo" | Clean Bandit featuring Demi Lovato | 110 Karat | Die Amigos |
| 3 August | "Bella ciao" (Hugel Remix) | El Profesor | Mamma Mia! Here We Go Again: The Movie Soundtrack | Various artists |
| 10 August | "Bella ciao" (Hugel Remix) | El Profesor | Mamma Mia! Here We Go Again: The Movie Soundtrack | Various artists |
| 17 August | "Melodien" | Capital Bra featuring Juju | Mamma Mia! Here We Go Again: The Movie Soundtrack | Various artists |
| 24 August | "In My Mind" | Dynoro and Gigi D'Agostino | Platin war gestern | Kollegah and Farid Bang |
| 31 August | "In My Mind" | Dynoro and Gigi D'Agostino | VVS | Ufo361 |
| 7 September | "In My Mind" | Dynoro and Gigi D'Agostino | Jugendliebe – Unvergessene Schlager | Andy Borg |
| 14 September | "In My Mind" | Dynoro and Gigi D'Agostino | Kamikaze | Eminem |
| 21 September | "In My Mind" | Dynoro and Gigi D'Agostino | Kamikaze | Eminem |
| 28 September | "Kokain" | Bonez MC and RAF Camora featuring Gzuz | #Hektarparty | Die Draufgänger |
| 5 October | "In My Mind" | Dynoro and Gigi D'Agostino | Überall zu Hause | Christina Stürmer |
| 12 October | "In My Mind" | Dynoro and Gigi D'Agostino | Mythos | Bushido |
| 19 October | "Nummer unterdrückt" | Bonez MC and RAF Camora | Palmen aus Plastik 2 | Bonez MC and RAF Camora |
| 26 October | "In My Mind" | Dynoro and Gigi D'Agostino | Palmen aus Plastik 2 | Bonez MC and RAF Camora |
| 2 November | "Shallow" | Lady Gaga and Bradley Cooper | From Vienna with Love | Conchita Wurst with the Vienna Symphony |
| 9 November | "Shallow" | Lady Gaga and Bradley Cooper | Palmen aus Plastik 2 | Bonez MC and RAF Camora |
| 16 November | "Shallow" | Lady Gaga and Bradley Cooper | Klee | Ina Regen |
| 23 November | "Shallow" | Lady Gaga and Bradley Cooper | Tumult | Herbert Grönemeyer |
| 30 November | "Perfekt" | RAF Camora and AriBeatz featuring Sofiane | Tumult | Herbert Grönemeyer |
| 7 December | "Baller los" | Mero | Vita ce n'è | Eros Ramazzotti |
| 14 December | "Sweet but Psycho" | Ava Max | Tumult | Herbert Grönemeyer |
| 21 December | "Sweet but Psycho" | Ava Max | Monument | Kollegah |
| 28 December | No Top 40 released | | | |
