= List of number-one hits of 2018 (Switzerland) =

This is a list of the Swiss Hitparade number ones of 2018.

== Swiss charts ==
Issue date	Song	Artist	Album	Artist
7 January	"Perfect"	Ed Sheeran	÷	Ed Sheeran
14 January	"Perfect"	Ed Sheeran	÷	Ed Sheeran
21 January	"Perfect"	Ed Sheeran	÷	Ed Sheeran
28 January	"Perfect"	Ed Sheeran	÷	Ed Sheeran
4 February	"Perfect"	Ed Sheeran	Schnupf, Schnaps + Edelwyss	Trauffer
11 February	"Perfect"	Ed Sheeran	Schnupf, Schnaps + Edelwyss	Trauffer
18 February	"Perfect"	Ed Sheeran	Schnupf, Schnaps + Edelwyss	Trauffer
25 February	"Perfect"	Ed Sheeran	Schnupf, Schnaps + Edelwyss	Trauffer
4 March	"Perfect"	Ed Sheeran	Schnupf, Schnaps + Edelwyss	Trauffer
11 March	"Perfect"	Ed Sheeran	Schnupf, Schnaps + Edelwyss	Trauffer
18 March	"079"	Lo & Leduc	2018: Musique!	Les Enfoirés
25 March	"079"	Lo & Leduc	Wohlfühlgarantie	Beatrice Egli
1 April	"079"	Lo & Leduc	Ceinture noire	Maître Gims
8 April	"079"	Lo & Leduc	Fast Life	Azet
15 April	"079"	Lo & Leduc	KombiNation	Bligg
22 April	"079"	Lo & Leduc	KombiNation	Bligg
29 April	"079"	Lo & Leduc	Kaspar Melchior Balthasar	Dezmond Dez, Tommy Vercetti & CBN
6 May	"079"	Lo & Leduc	Captain Fantastic	Die Fantastischen Vier
13 May	"079"	Lo & Leduc	Härz Schritt Macherin	Steff La Cheffe
20 May	"079"	Lo & Leduc	Tranquility Base Hotel & Casino	Arctic Monkeys
27 May	"079"	Lo & Leduc	And Justice for None	Five Finger Death Punch
3 June	"079"	Lo & Leduc	Shawn Mendes	Shawn Mendes
10 June	"079"	Lo & Leduc	Vergiss mein nicht	Andreas Gabalier
17 June	"079"	Lo & Leduc	Vergiss mein nicht	Andreas Gabalier
24 June	"079"	Lo & Leduc	Lithopédion	Damso
1 July	"079"	Lo & Leduc	Berlin lebt	Capital Bra
8 July	"079"	Lo & Leduc	Scorpion	Drake
15 July	"079"	Lo & Leduc	Scorpion	Drake
22 July	"079"	Lo & Leduc	110 Karat	Die Amigos
29 July	"079"	Lo & Leduc	Sommerküsse	Calimeros
5 August	"079"	Lo & Leduc	Endstufe	Summer Cem
12 August	"Melodien"	Capital Bra featuring Juju	E Guete – Bon appétit	Miss Helvetia
19 August	"In My Mind"	Dynoro and Gigi D'Agostino	Platin war gestern	Kollegah and Farid Bang
26 August	"In My Mind"	Dynoro and Gigi D'Agostino	Sweetener	Ariana Grande
2 September	"In My Mind"	Dynoro and Gigi D'Agostino	Vom Gipfel is Tal	Heimweh
9 September	"In My Mind"	Dynoro and Gigi D'Agostino	Kamikaze	Eminem
16 September	"In My Mind"	Dynoro and Gigi D'Agostino	Kamikaze	Eminem
23 September	"In My Mind"	Dynoro and Gigi D'Agostino	Kamikaze	Eminem
30 September	"In My Mind"	Dynoro and Gigi D'Agostino	Living the Dream	Slash
7 October	"In My Mind"	Dynoro and Gigi D'Agostino	Mythos	Bushido
14 October	"Shallow"	Lady Gaga and Bradley Cooper	Palmen aus Plastik 2	Bonez MC and RAF Camora
21 October	"Shallow"	Lady Gaga and Bradley Cooper	A Star Is Born	Lady Gaga and Bradley Cooper
28 October	"Shallow"	Lady Gaga and Bradley Cooper	Mon pays c'est l'amour	Johnny Hallyday
4 November	"Shallow"	Lady Gaga and Bradley Cooper	Mon pays c'est l'amour	Johnny Hallyday
11 November	"Shallow"	Lady Gaga and Bradley Cooper	Mon pays c'est l'amour	Johnny Hallyday
18 November	"Shallow"	Lady Gaga and Bradley Cooper	Simulation Theory	Muse
25 November	"Shallow"	Lady Gaga and Bradley Cooper	Down the Road Wherever	Mark Knopfler
2 December	"Sweet but Psycho"	Ava Max	Vita ce n'è	Eros Ramazzotti
9 December	"Sweet but Psycho"	Ava Max	Vita ce n'è	Eros Ramazzotti
16 December	"Sweet but Psycho"	Ava Max	Monument	Kollegah
23 December	"Sweet but Psycho"	Ava Max	Mon pays c'est l'amour	Johnny Hallyday
30 December	"All I Want for Christmas Is You"	Mariah Carey	Mon pays c'est l'amour	Johnny Hallyday

== Romandie charts ==
Issue date	Song	Artist	Album	Artist
7 January	"Perfect"	Ed Sheeran	÷	Ed Sheeran
14 January	"Perfect"	Ed Sheeran	÷	Ed Sheeran
21 January	"Perfect"	Ed Sheeran	÷	Ed Sheeran
28 January	"Perfect"	Ed Sheeran	÷	Ed Sheeran
4 February	"Perfect"	Ed Sheeran	Solune	Slimane
11 February	"Perfect"	Ed Sheeran	XEU	Vald
18 February	"Perfect"	Ed Sheeran	Fifty Shades Freed (Original Motion Picture Soundtrack)	Various artists
25 February	"Perfect"	Ed Sheeran	Plan B	Grand Corps Malade
4 March	"Perfect"	Ed Sheeran	Plan B	Grand Corps Malade
11 March	"Perfect"	Ed Sheeran	Cure	Eddy de Pretto
18 March	"Perfect"	Ed Sheeran	2018: Musique!	Les Enfoirés
25 March	"Leave a Light On"	Tom Walker	2018: Musique!	Les Enfoirés
1 April	"Leave a Light On"	Tom Walker	Ceinture noire	Maître Gims
8 April	"La Cintura"	Álvaro Soler	2018: Musique!	Les Enfoirés
15 April	"Leave a Light On"	Tom Walker	Around You I Found You	Wintershome
22 April	"079"	Lo & Leduc	Ceinture noire	Maître Gims
29 April	"Wake Me Up!"	Avicii	Ceinture noire	Maître Gims
6 May	"Flames"	David Guetta and Sia	44/876	Sting and Shaggy
13 May	"Flames"	David Guetta and Sia	Eonian	Dimmu Borgir
20 May	"La même"	Maître Gims and Vianney	Tranquility Base Hotel & Casino	Arctic Monkeys
27 May	"Flames"	David Guetta and Sia	Je reviens à toi	Marc Lavoine
3 June	"Flames"	David Guetta and Sia	Shawn Mendes	Shawn Mendes
10 June	"Flames"	David Guetta and Sia	Prequelle	Ghost
17 June	"La même"	Maître Gims and Vianney	En cas de tempête, ce jardin sera fermé	Cœur de pirate
24 June	"Flames"	David Guetta and Sia	Lithopédion	Damso
1 July	"Flames"	David Guetta and Sia	Lithopédion	Damso
8 July	"La Cintura"	Álvaro Soler	The Now Now	Gorillaz
15 July	"Flames"	David Guetta and Sia	High as Hope	Florence and the Machine
22 July	"Alright"	Jain	110 Karat	Die Amigos
29 July	"Solo"	Clean Bandit featuring Demi Lovato	The Sacrament of Sin	Powerwolf
5 August	"La Cintura"	Álvaro Soler	Mamma Mia! Here We Go Again: The Movie Soundtrack	Various artists
12 August	"Solo"	Clean Bandit featuring Demi Lovato	Mamma Mia! Here We Go Again: The Movie Soundtrack	Various artists
19 August	"In My Mind"	Dynoro and Gigi D'Agostino	Mamma Mia! Here We Go Again: The Movie Soundtrack	Various artists
26 August	"In My Mind"	Dynoro and Gigi D'Agostino	Au bout de nos rêves	Kids United Nouvelle Génération
2 September	"In My Mind"	Dynoro and Gigi D'Agostino	Souldier	Jain
9 September	"In My Mind"	Dynoro and Gigi D'Agostino	Amigo	Kendji Girac
16 September	"In My Mind"	Dynoro and Gigi D'Agostino	Essenciel	Zazie
23 September	"In My Mind"	Dynoro and Gigi D'Agostino	Kamikaze	Eminem
30 September	"In My Mind"	Dynoro and Gigi D'Agostino	Chris	Christine and the Queens
7 October	"Shallow"	Lady Gaga and Bradley Cooper	Désobéissance	Mylène Farmer
14 October	"Shallow"	Lady Gaga and Bradley Cooper	Désobéissance	Mylène Farmer
21 October	"Shallow"	Lady Gaga and Bradley Cooper	A Star Is Born	Lady Gaga and Bradley Cooper
28 October	"Shallow"	Lady Gaga and Bradley Cooper	Mon pays c'est l'amour	Johnny Hallyday
4 November	"Shallow"	Lady Gaga and Bradley Cooper	Mon pays c'est l'amour	Johnny Hallyday
11 November	"Shallow"	Lady Gaga and Bradley Cooper	Mon pays c'est l'amour	Johnny Hallyday
18 November	"Shallow"	Lady Gaga and Bradley Cooper	Simulation Theory	Muse
25 November	"Shallow"	Lady Gaga and Bradley Cooper	Mon pays c'est l'amour	Johnny Hallyday
2 December	"Shallow"	Lady Gaga and Bradley Cooper	Mon pays c'est l'amour	Johnny Hallyday
9 December	"Shallow"	Lady Gaga and Bradley Cooper	Mon pays c'est l'amour	Johnny Hallyday
16 December	"Shallow"	Lady Gaga and Bradley Cooper	Mon pays c'est l'amour	Johnny Hallyday
23 December	"Shallow"	Lady Gaga and Bradley Cooper	Mon pays c'est l'amour	Johnny Hallyday
30 December	"Shallow"	Lady Gaga and Bradley Cooper	Mon pays c'est l'amour	Johnny Hallyday
