= List of number-one singles of 2019 (Slovenia) =

SloTop50 singles 2019
Winners
- Most weeks at No. 1: "Señorita"
- Year End No. 1: "Sweet but Psycho"

The Slovenian number-one singles of 2019 were compiled by SloTop50, is the official chart provider of Slovenia. SloTop50 publishes weekly charts once a week, every Sunday. These Chart includes data generated by the SloTop50 system for any song played during the period starting from Monday morning at time 00:00:00 and ending on Sunday night at 23:59:59.

== Charts ==
=== Number-one singles by week ===
Weekly charted #1 songs and highest charted counting among domestic songs only

†	Indicates best-performing single of 2019

No.	Week	Issue date	Number one	Artist	Top domestic song	Top domestic artist
re	314	6 January 2019	"Promises"	Calvin Harris ft. Sam Smith	"Peru"	BQL
re	315	13 January 2019	"Promises"	Calvin Harris ft. Sam Smith	"Peru"	BQL
re	316	20 January 2019	"In My Mind"	Dynoro ft. Gigi D'Agostino	"Peru"	BQL
re re	317	27 January 2019	"In My Mind" "Promises"	Dynoro ft. Gigi D'Agostino; Calvin Harris ft. Sam Smith	"Peru"	BQL
re	318	3 February 2019	"In My Mind"	Dynoro ft. Gigi D'Agostino	"Peru"	BQL
73	319	10 February 2019	"Sweet but Psycho"	Ava Max	"Peru"	BQL
73	320	17 February 2019	"Sweet but Psycho"	Ava Max	"Luna"	Nika Zorjan ft. J. Haller
73	321	24 February 2019	"Sweet but Psycho"	Ava Max	"Sebi"	Zala Kralj & Gašper Šantl
73	322	3 March 2019	"Sweet but Psycho"	Ava Max	"Sebi"	Zala Kralj & Gašper Šantl
73	323	10 March 2019	"Sweet but Psycho"	Ava Max	"Sebi"	Zala Kralj & Gašper Šantl
73	324	17 March 2019	"Sweet but Psycho"	Ava Max	"Sebi"	Zala Kralj & Gašper Šantl
73	325	24 March 2019	"Sweet but Psycho"	Ava Max	"Sebi"	Zala Kralj & Gašper Šantl
73	326	31 March 2019	"Sweet but Psycho"	Ava Max	"Sebi"	Zala Kralj & Gašper Šantl
73	327	7 April 2019	"Sweet but Psycho"	Ava Max	"V srce"	Natalija Verboten
73	328	14 April 2019	"Sweet but Psycho"	Ava Max	"V srce"	Natalija Verboten
74	329	21 April 2019	"Nothing Breaks Like a Heart"	Mark Ronson feat. Miley Cyrus	"V srce"	Natalija Verboten
75	330	28 April 2019	"Giant"	Calvin Harris and Rag'n'Bone Man	"V srce"	Natalija Verboten
75	331	5 May 2019	"Giant"	Calvin Harris and Rag'n'Bone Man	"V srce"	Natalija Verboten
75	332	12 May 2019	"Giant"	Calvin Harris and Rag'n'Bone Man	"Sebi"	Zala Kralj & Gašper Šantl
76	333	19 May 2019	"Con Calma"	Daddy Yankee feat. Snow	"Sebi"	Zala Kralj & Gašper Šantl
76	334	26 May 2019	"Con Calma"	Daddy Yankee feat. Snow	"Ola Ola"	Nika Zorjan & Isaac Palma
76	335	2 June 2019	"Con Calma"	Daddy Yankee feat. Snow	"Ola Ola"	Nika Zorjan & Isaac Palma
76	336	9 June 2019	"Con Calma"	Daddy Yankee feat. Snow	"Ola Ola"	Nika Zorjan & Isaac Palma
76	337	16 June 2019	"Con Calma"	Daddy Yankee feat. Snow	"Ola Ola"	Nika Zorjan & Isaac Palma
76	338	23 June 2019	"Con Calma"	Daddy Yankee feat. Snow	"Ola Ola"	Nika Zorjan & Isaac Palma
76	339	30 June 2019	"Con Calma"	Daddy Yankee feat. Snow	"Ola Ola"	Nika Zorjan & Isaac Palma
76	340	7 July 2019	"Con Calma"	Daddy Yankee feat. Snow	"Ola Ola"	Nika Zorjan & Isaac Palma
76	341	14 July 2019	"Con Calma"	Daddy Yankee feat. Snow	"Ola Ola"	Nika Zorjan & Isaac Palma
76	342	21 July 2019	"Con Calma"	Daddy Yankee feat. Snow	"Ola Ola"	Nika Zorjan & Isaac Palma
76	343	28 July 2019	"Con Calma"	Daddy Yankee feat. Snow	"Ola Ola"	Nika Zorjan & Isaac Palma
77	344	4 August 2019	"I Don't Care"	Ed Sheeran and Justin Bieber	"Ola Ola"	Nika Zorjan & Isaac Palma
77	345	11 August 2019	"I Don't Care"	Ed Sheeran and Justin Bieber	"Čaša vina"	Natalija Verboten ft. Best
77	346	18 August 2019	"I Don't Care"	Ed Sheeran and Justin Bieber	"Čaša vina"	Natalija Verboten ft. Best
78	347	25 August 2019	"Señorita"	Shawn Mendes and Camila Cabello	"Na plažo"	Nika Zorjan
78	348	1 September 2019	"Señorita"	Shawn Mendes and Camila Cabello	"Na plažo"	Nika Zorjan
78	349	8 September 2019	"Señorita"	Shawn Mendes and Camila Cabello	"Čaša vina"	Natalija Verboten ft. Best
78	350	15 September 2019	"Señorita"	Shawn Mendes and Camila Cabello	"Čaša vina"	Natalija Verboten ft. Best
78	351	22 September 2019	"Señorita"	Shawn Mendes and Camila Cabello	"Čaša vina"	Natalija Verboten ft. Best
78	352	29 September 2019	"Señorita"	Shawn Mendes and Camila Cabello	"Čaša vina"	Natalija Verboten ft. Best
78	353	6 October 2019	"Señorita"	Shawn Mendes and Camila Cabello	"Čaša vina"	Natalija Verboten ft. Best
78	354	13 October 2019	"Señorita"	Shawn Mendes and Camila Cabello	"Čaša vina"	Natalija Verboten ft. Best
78	355	20 October 2019	"Señorita"	Shawn Mendes and Camila Cabello	"Serenada"	Manca Špik
78	356	27 October 2019	"Señorita"	Shawn Mendes and Camila Cabello	"Ola Ola"	Nika Zorjan & Isaac Palma
78	357	3 November 2019	"Señorita"	Shawn Mendes and Camila Cabello	"Vroče"	S.I.T.
78	358	10 November 2019	"Señorita"	Shawn Mendes and Camila Cabello	"Ola Ola"	Nika Zorjan & Isaac Palma
78	359	17 November 2019	"Señorita"	Shawn Mendes and Camila Cabello	"Svet na dlani"	Nina Pušlar
78	360	24 November 2019	"Señorita"	Shawn Mendes and Camila Cabello	"Svet na dlani"	Nina Pušlar
78	361	1 December 2019	"Señorita"	Shawn Mendes and Camila Cabello	"Svet na dlani"	Nina Pušlar
78	362	8 December 2019	"Señorita"	Shawn Mendes and Camila Cabello	"Svet na dlani"	Nina Pušlar
78	363	15 December 2019	"Señorita"	Shawn Mendes and Camila Cabello	"Svet na dlani"	Nina Pušlar
79	364	22 December 2019	"Dance Monkey"	Tones and I	"Bela snežinka"	Veter
79	365	29 December 2019	"Dance Monkey"	Tones and I	"Bela snežinka"	Veter

=== Number-one singles by month ===
Monthly charted #1 songs and highest charted counting among domestic songs only

No.	Month	Issue date	Number-one	Artist	Top domestic song	Top domestic artist
re	73	January 2019	"Promises"	Calvin Harris ft. Sam Smith	"Peru"	BQL
44	74	February 2019	"Sweet but Psycho"	Ava Max	"Peru"	BQL
44	75	March 2019	"Sweet but Psycho"	Ava Max	"Peru"	BQL
45	76	April 2019	"Sweet but Psycho"	Ava Max	"V srce"	Natalija Verboten
46	77	May 2019	"Giant"	Calvin Harris and Rag'n'Bone Man	"Sebi"	Zala Kralj & Gašper Šantl
47	78	June 2019	"Con Calma"	Daddy Yankee feat. Snow	"Ola Ola"	Nika Zorjan & Isaac Palma
47	79	July 2019	"Con Calma"	Daddy Yankee feat. Snow	"Ola Ola"	Nika Zorjan & Isaac Palma
48	80	August 2019	"I Don't Care"	Ed Sheeran and Justin Bieber	"Čaša vina"	Natalija Verboten ft. Best
49	81	September 2019	"Señorita"	Shawn Mendes and Camila Cabello	"Čaša vina"	Natalija Verboten ft. Best
50	82	October 2019	"Señorita"	Shawn Mendes and Camila Cabello	"Ola Ola"	Nika Zorjan & Isaac Palma
51	83	November 2019	"Señorita"	Shawn Mendes and Camila Cabello	"Svet na dlani"	Nina Pušlar
