= List of number-one singles of 2018 (Finland) =

This is the complete list of number-one singles in Finland in 2018 according to the Official Finnish Charts. The list on the left side of the box (Suomen virallinen singlelista, "the Official Finnish Singles Chart") represents physical and digital track sales as well as music streaming, and the one on the right side (Suomen virallinen radiosoittolista, "the Official Finnish Airplay Chart") represents airplay.

== Chart history ==
Official Finnish Singles Chart				Official Finnish Airplay Chart			
Issue date	Song	Artist(s)	Reference(s)	Issue date	Song	Artist(s)	Reference(s)
Week 1	"Popkorni"	JVG		Week 1	"Muitaki ihmisii"	Vesala	
Week 2	"Popkorni"	JVG		Week 2	"Tuntematon"	Haloo Helsinki!	
Week 3	"Popkorni"	JVG		Week 3	"Tuntematon"	Haloo Helsinki!	
Week 4	"Jättiläinen"	Pyhimys (featuring Aksel Kankaanranta)		Week 4	"Tuntematon"	Haloo Helsinki!	
Week 5	"Popkorni"	JVG		Week 5	"Tuntematon"	Haloo Helsinki!	
Week 6	"Vedän sut henkeen"	Antti Tuisku		Week 6	"Tuntematon"	Haloo Helsinki!	
Week 7	"Texas"	Haloo Helsinki! (featuring JVG)		Week 7	"Tornado"	Evelina	
Week 8	"Rikkinäinen prinsessa"	Nikke Ankara		Week 8	"Tornado"	Evelina	
Week 9	"Rikkinäinen prinsessa"	Nikke Ankara		Week 9	"Tornado"	Evelina	
Week 10	"Sun vika"	Evelina		Week 10	"Olisitpa sylissäni"	Antti Ketonen	
Week 11	"Rikkinäinen prinsessa"	Nikke Ankara		Week 11	"Olisitpa sylissäni"	Antti Ketonen	
Week 12	"Pornoo"	Sanni		Week 12	"Olisitpa sylissäni"	Antti Ketonen	
Week 13	"Pornoo"	Sanni		Week 13	"Olisitpa sylissäni"	Antti Ketonen	
Week 14	"Satutat mua"	Tippa		Week 14	"Olisitpa sylissäni"	Antti Ketonen	
Week 15	"Timanttei"	Mikael Gabriel		Week 15	"Olisitpa sylissäni"	Antti Ketonen	
Week 16	"Timanttei"	Mikael Gabriel		Week 16	"Olisitpa sylissäni"	Antti Ketonen	
Week 17	"Kevät"	Adi L Hasla (featuring Pihlaja)		Week 17	"Väärään suuntaan"	Jenni Vartiainen	
Week 18	"Kevät"	Adi L Hasla (featuring Pihlaja)		Week 18	"Olisitpa sylissäni"	Antti Ketonen	
Week 19	"Kevät"	Adi L Hasla (featuring Pihlaja)		Week 19	"Olisitpa sylissäni"	Antti Ketonen	
Week 20	"Kevät"	Adi L Hasla (featuring Pihlaja)		Week 20	"Olisitpa sylissäni"	Antti Ketonen	
Week 21	"Kevät"	Adi L Hasla (featuring Pihlaja)		Week 21	"Olisitpa sylissäni"	Antti Ketonen	
Week 22	"Kevät"	Adi L Hasla (featuring Pihlaja)		Week 22	"Väärään suuntaan"	Jenni Vartiainen	
Week 23	"Kevät"	Adi L Hasla (featuring Pihlaja)		Week 23	"Kuka näkee sut"	Juha Tapio	
Week 24	"Solo"	Clean Bandit (featuring Demi Lovato)		Week 24	"Kuka näkee sut"	Juha Tapio	
Week 25	"Jacuzzi"	Sanni		Week 25	"Kuka näkee sut"	Juha Tapio	
Week 26	"Solo"	Clean Bandit (featuring Demi Lovato)		Week 26	"Nyt on lähtö"	Vesala	
Week 27	"XTC"	Lukas Leon, Etta and Cheek		Week 27	"Kaksi ihmistä"	Haloo Helsinki!	
Week 28	"XTC"	Lukas Leon, Etta and Cheek		Week 28	"Kaksi ihmistä"	Haloo Helsinki!	
Week 29	"Solo"	Clean Bandit (featuring Demi Lovato)		Week 29	"Kaksi ihmistä"	Haloo Helsinki!	
Week 30	"Solo"	Clean Bandit (featuring Demi Lovato)		Week 30	"Kaksi ihmistä"	Haloo Helsinki!	
Week 31	"Solo"	Clean Bandit (featuring Demi Lovato)		Week 31	"Kaksi ihmistä"	Haloo Helsinki!	
Week 32	"Yhen elämän juttu"	Abreu		Week 32	"Kaksi ihmistä"	Haloo Helsinki!	
Week 33	"In My Mind"	Dynoro and Gigi D'Agostino		Week 33	"Supervoimii"	Elastinen	
Week 34	"In My Mind"	Dynoro and Gigi D'Agostino		Week 34	"Supervoimii"	Elastinen	
Week 35	"In My Mind"	Dynoro and Gigi D'Agostino		Week 35	"Supervoimii"	Elastinen	
Week 36	"In My Mind"	Dynoro and Gigi D'Agostino		Week 36	"Supervoimii"	Elastinen	
Week 37	"In My Mind"	Dynoro and Gigi D'Agostino		Week 37	"Supervoimii"	Elastinen	
Week 38	"I Love It"	Kanye West and Lil Pump		Week 38	"Supervoimii"	Elastinen	
Week 39	"Falling Down"	Lil Peep and XXXTentacion		Week 39	"Kuka näkee sut"	Juha Tapio	
Week 40	"Falling Down"	Lil Peep and XXXTentacion		Week 40	"Me ollaan runo"	Anna Puu	
Week 41	"Falling Down"	Lil Peep and XXXTentacion		Week 41	"Mä en pelkää"	Lauri Tähkä	
Week 42	"Falling Down"	Lil Peep and XXXTentacion		Week 42	"Mä en pelkää"	Lauri Tähkä	
Week 43	"Loppuun asti"	Elastinen		Week 43	"Ilves"	Anssi Kela	
Week 44	"Sweet but Psycho"	Ava Max		Week 44	"Ilves"	Anssi Kela	
Week 45	"Sweet but Psycho"	Ava Max		Week 45	"Ilves"	Anssi Kela	
Week 46	"Thank U, Next"	Ariana Grande		Week 46	"Ilves"	Anssi Kela	
Week 47	"Sweet but Psycho"	Ava Max		Week 47	"Ilves"	Anssi Kela	
Week 48	"Sweet but Psycho"	Ava Max		Week 48	"Ilves"	Anssi Kela	
Week 49	"Sweet but Psycho"	Ava Max		Week 49	"Sweet but Psycho"	Ava Max	
Week 50	"Sweet but Psycho"	Ava Max		Week 50	"Mä en pelkää"	Lauri Tähkä	
Week 51	"Sweet but Psycho"	Ava Max		Week 51	"Sweet but Psycho"	Ava Max	
Week 52	"All I Want for Christmas Is You"	Mariah Carey		Week 52	"Sweet but Psycho"	Ava Max	

== See also ==
- List of number-one albums of 2018 (Finland)
