= Sweet but Psycho =

2018 debut single by Ava Max

Single by Ava Max

from the album Heaven & Hell
- Released: August 17, 2018
- Genre: Pop; dance-pop; electropop; synth-pop
- Length: 3:07
- Label: Atlantic
- Songwriters: Amanda Ava Koci; Andreas Andresen Haukeland; William Lobban-Bean; Madison Love; Henry Walter
- Producer: Cirkut

Ava Max singles chronology
"Into Your Arms" (2018)	"Sweet but Psycho" (2018)	"Make Up" (2018)

Music video
- "Sweet but Psycho" on YouTube

"Sweet but Psycho" is the debut single by American singer-songwriter Ava Max, released on August 17, 2018, through Atlantic Records. It is included on her debut studio album Heaven & Hell (2020). The song was written by Max, Madison Love, TIX, Cook Classics, and the producer Cirkut. "Sweet but Psycho" is an EDM and synth-pop song with lyrics about the perception of a young woman. The song's title was inspired by frequent interactions between Max and her parents. It received mixed to positive reviews from music critics, who praised its upbeat sound and chorus, but criticized its production.

Upon release, "Sweet but Psycho" appeared on various Spotify playlists before peaking at number one in 22 countries, including Sweden, Finland, Norway, and the United Kingdom. The song was Max's first top 10 single in the United States, peaking at number 10 on the Billboard Hot 100. It was the highest-selling year-end song of 2019 in Slovenia and has attained multiplatinum certifications in 13 countries, as well as diamond in France, Brazil, Germany, and Poland.

An accompanying music video, directed by Shomi Patwary, was released on August 27, 2018, and depicts Max's character assaulting a man portrayed by model Prasad Romijn. The video was compared to films Fatal Attraction (1987) and The Shining (1980), as well as music videos by Rihanna and Bebe Rexha. Max performed the song at several televised events and as part of a medley during the 2019 MTV Video Music Awards and 2019 MTV Europe Music Awards shows.

== Background and development ==
In 2014, after having had several demos rejected by producers and songwriters, and being caught out by questionable business deals, Max first met Canadian record producer Cirkut at a dinner party hosted by him in Los Angeles, California. After Max sang "Happy Birthday" to Cirkut, he took her under his wing and handled production of her music. In July 2016, she released the song "Anyone but You" on SoundCloud, which became popular and attracted the interest of several record labels that contacted her via email, with Max ultimately signing with Atlantic Records. American songwriter Madison Love wrote "Sweet but Psycho" after signing a publishing deal with Artist Partner Group (APG), as Max proceeded to sign as an artist with the same label within a short time period. APG founder Mike Caren suggested that Max should appear on "Sweet but Psycho" to Love, which was the latter's introduction to executive production. Max and Love coincidentally collaborated together as friends during their time in college. In a 2021 interview with Rolling Stone, Love expressed happiness in her role of Max's breakthrough using "straight pop" since "every song on the radio was rap".

"Sweet but Psycho" was released for digital download and streaming by Atlantic Records as the first single from Max's debut studio album Heaven & Hell (2020). The song was written by Max, Love, Tix, Cook Classics, and Cirkut, with the latter of the five solely handling production. When Max was a child, her parents said that "you're sweet, but you're a little psycho"; this inspired the song's title. In an interview with Idolator, Max discussed the message of the song, stating it is "about a girl who's not afraid to show all of her sides and her dualities, and about a guy loving all those sides". Max continued, saying she was misunderstood as a "psycho" but was "an outspoken girl ... speaking her mind".

== Composition and lyrics ==
"Sweet but Psycho"
A 19 second sample of the song, featuring its electronic dance music-themed chorus using three hypnotic hooks that overlap with each other, while a stereo call and response is placed in every fourth measure.

"Sweet but Psycho" is a pop, dance-pop, electropop, and synth-pop song that was inspired by music of the 1980s. Sheet music shows a time signature of 4/4 common time, with a tempo of 137 beats per minute, in the key of D♭ major. Three distinct, hypnotic hooks are used in the electronic dance music-themed chorus; the hooks overlap with each other, including "psycho/right though", "m-m-m-m-mine" [sic], and "run, don’t walk away". Max's vocals are pitch-altered and overshadow the stock scream effects used in the production. Bubblegum pop inspired verses are incorporated with hand-claps, and the bridge uses elements of trap music that are accompanied by a belt from Max. A kick-drum roll is used in the downbeat, which also includes a stereo call and response in every fourth measure of the chorus, coming second in the verse, and the first half of the pre-chorus.

Chris DeVille of Stereogum compared "Sweet but Psycho" to Eurodance songs such as La Bouche's "Be My Lover", Eiffel 65's "Blue (Da Ba Dee)", and Cascada's "Everytime We Touch", along with Lady Gaga's electropop singles "Poker Face" and "Bad Romance". The lyrics of the track describe the perception of women in relationships; the word "psycho" refers to the feeling of being accepted for having an outspoken personality. A quotation from the American television series 30 Rock is referenced in the chorus' lyrics, "Grab a cop gun kinda crazy / She's poison but tasty".

Remixes of "Sweet but Psycho" by Paul Morrell, Morgan Page, and Dirty Disco were released. Morrell's remix has a dark tone and lead, with a thick bassline in contrast to Page's uplifting remix that includes melodic touches. The Dirty Disco remix fuses layered piano chords and synthesizer stabs with drum programming to make the song sound "tribal".

== Critical reception ==
"Sweet but Psycho" was met with mixed to positive reviews from music critics. Writing for Billboard, Jon Ali praised "Sweet but Psycho" for providing an "instantly addictive" slice of pop; the publication also singled out the "pristine, instantly repeatable chorus". Sam Brooks of The Spinoff called it "a Frankenstein of a pop track" and said the song would fit the tracklist of Lady Gaga's 2008 debut album The Fame. He commended Max for fusing elements of the music of Gaga, Katy Perry, and Marina Diamandis to become the Mary Shelley of pop. According to the Belfast Telegraph staff, the song is "infectiously catchy, earworm-friendly", and sassy. Vulture writer Myles Tanzer said the song "follows the classic Luke and Cirkut formula: a scientifically perfect '80s-inspired pop song, heavy on hooks and tweetable lyrics".

In a mixed review, The Daily Telegraph writer Alim Kheraj called "Sweet but Psycho" "an unapologetically generic piece of pop" and opined that in contrast to Billie Holiday's "Crazy He Calls Me", Patsy Cline's "Crazy", Madonna's "Crazy for You", and Beyoncé's "Crazy in Love"—which are all songs about male-inspired women's madness—it says "interesting things" about female artists' newly found freedom of expression and that female pop singers are "now reclaiming the negative connotations around madness and womenhood [sic]".

== Commercial performance ==
=== Europe ===
The release of "Sweet but Psycho" led to the song being promoted on streaming services, with Max seeing an increase in streams and social media followers. It topped the Swedish Spotify chart and had strong engagement in Bulgaria, which led to Caren recommending the song should be established in Nordic countries before expanding to the United States. "Sweet but Psycho" topped the Sverigetopplistan chart of Sweden on October 5, 2018, remaining at the summit for four consecutive weeks, before entering the charts in Finland and Norway, and peaking at number one in both of the countries. Writing about the song's international performance, Dan Rys of Billboard compared it to promotional strategies used by the Backstreet Boys and Dua Lipa, stating that they "have always worked in Europe and outside of America". He noted that "Sweet but Psycho" performed better on the Billboard Global Excl. US chart than on the Global 200, since it was formulated from personal collections over streaming playlists.

In the United Kingdom, the song reached number two on the 2018 UK Singles Chart Christmas chart, behind British blogger LadBaby, who entered at number one that year with his cover of the 1985 Starship song "We Built This City", which outsold "Sweet but Psycho" by 18,500 units. The following week, "Sweet but Psycho" peaked at number one on the UK Singles Chart, where it remained for four weeks before being replaced by Ariana Grande's "7 Rings" (2019). The song was certified quintuple platinum by the British Phonographic Industry (BPI) on April 3, 2026, for selling 3,000,000 equivalent units.

In the Republic of Ireland, "Sweet but Psycho" peaked at the top of the Irish Singles Chart and remained on the chart for 53 weeks. It also reached the summit on the 2018 Irish Singles Chart Christmas number ones, beating Grande's "Thank U, Next" (2018) by 300 units in sales. On the German Offizielle Deutsche Charts, the song debuted at number 82 on October 26, 2018, later topping the chart for six weeks and charting for 50 weeks. In Slovenia, it peaked at number one and ranked at the same position on the country's 2019 year-end chart. In Poland, "Sweet but Psycho" topped the Polish Airplay Top 100 on the chart issued January 19, 2019, where it was ultimately certified diamond by the Polish Society of the Phonographic Industry (ZPAV) for track-equivalent sales of 100,000 units.

=== North America, Oceania and Brazil ===
"Sweet but Psycho" debuted at number 87 on the Billboard Hot 100 for the December 29, 2018, issue of Billboard. The song peaked at number 10 on the week of June 1, 2019, and remained at the position for three consecutive weeks, earning Max her first top 10 song in the US. The staff of Billboard said the song's "anomaly" in contemporaneous mainstream music that embraced hip hop and R&B allowed pop radio to immediately accept its mainstream sound after stagnating from the "clumsy" rotation of both genres in streaming media. The song also topped the US Dance Club Songs chart for the issue dated February 2, 2019, which was aided by several remixes by Paul Morrell, Morgan Page, and Dirty Disco. It was certified quadruple platinum by the Recording Industry Association of America (RIAA) on June 1, 2022, for sales of 4,000,000 certified units in the US. The song ranked at number 25 on The 25 Most-Consumed Songs of 2019 chart compiled by BuzzAngle Music, having sold more than 1,838,139 units. "Sweet but Psycho" peaked at number 11 on the Canadian Hot 100 for the May 11, 2019, issue of Billboard.

In Australia, "Sweet but Psycho" debuted on the ARIA Singles Chart for the issue dated November 11, 2018, at number 45. It peaked at number two for three consecutive weeks and remained on the chart for 31 weeks, eventually being certified five-times platinum by the Australian Recording Industry Association (ARIA) for selling 350,000 equivalent units in the country. The song topped the New Zealand Singles Chart on January 7, 2019, where it was later certified platinum by Recorded Music NZ (RMNZ) for selling 30,000 units in the country. In Brazil, "Sweet but Psycho" was certified double diamond by Pro-Música Brasil (PMB) for selling 320,000 equivalent units.

== Controversy ==
The lyrics of "Sweet but Psycho" have been criticized by several mental health advocates for stigmatizing mental illnesses. Kheraj stated the song "boasts lyrics akin to clickbait, pejoratively using terms such as 'psycho' and 'crazy' to evoke a sentiment that seems starkly at odds with the recent progress the music industry has made in how mental health is discussed". On January 25, 2019, the UK's Zero Suicide Alliance released an open letter condemning the song's lyrics for "perpetuating existing stereotypes" that further stigmatize mental illness; Irish mental health organizations tried to ban the song from radio airplay in their country due to the lyrics "misrepresenting psychotic illnesses". In response to the criticism, Max said in a 2019 interview with Vanity Fair that the song is about several gaslighting experiences with men. She defended the use of "psycho", stating the word has "a deeper meaning" and that she wanted the mental illness-related music video to be a theatrical experience for everyone.

== Music video ==
=== Background and development ===
The music video for "Sweet but Psycho" was directed by Bengali American filmmaker Shomi Patwary and features model Prasad Romijn. It was released on August 27, 2018. Max connected with Romijn through Instagram, where he was invited to film the music video through the producer. Patwary used saturated colors for the video so that it would be perceived as artificial; he did not want the visual to appear realistic because it would be too violent. Lens flare was constantly used; the video was filmed using a vintage anamorphic lens that was made by Lomo, and it was rotoscoped and filtered to appear sharp. An ending for the music video in which Max wakes up from a dream was filmed, though the sequence was scrapped because Patwary disliked the cut and wanted it to finish with an open-ended conclusion.

=== Synopsis ===
The music video's depiction of Max received a divisive response from critics and mental health advocates for stigmatizing illnesses.

The music video begins with a grayscale scene of a man kissing a woman outside an apartment as Max walks by in disgust. Cinematic black bars crop the image and the setting shifts to a brightly lit mansion. Max walks down a spiral staircase, wearing an orange jacket and black crop top; she has mascara streaks on her eyes. A piece of clothing is ripped by Max, and she invites the man by SMS to have dinner with her. Max then picks up a baseball bat, throws darts at a board with his face on the bullseye, drinks a glass of red wine, and smokes a cigarette. The man later arrives at the mansion, where Max (now in a skin-tight latex outfit) grabs him by the hand and leads him up the staircase to a banquet.

A red-haired Max slices a turkey, which the man eats. She then pours the red wine into his cup, with it changing to green. The man drinks the wine and immediately hallucinates as Max throws a kitchen knife at him, followed by him running down the staircase in horror. Max, wearing a wedding dress, dances alongside a bed containing the man, who has become comatose. She paints red splotches on an easel and shakes his head. In a flashing sequence, Max stands on the staircase, waves an axe, rips a photograph of the man, and rolls his unconscious head. In another scene, he escapes into Max's wardrobe as she smears his shirtless body with blood. In the wardrobe, a mutilated corpse falls out in front of the man. Sequences of Max with the unconscious man are shown; she pours gasoline on him then sets the room alight.

=== Reception ===
Hannah Hightman of V magazine described the music video as an "aesthetic psychosis", stating Max's psycho characteristics are "too possessive, too dominant, too uninhibited". She continued, complimenting the video's satirical nature, praising Max's parodies of the various uses of the word "psycho", describing the video as "a funhouse mirror distortion of relationship problems that many women face". Steve Erickson of Studio Daily considered it to be "a more modest version of Lady Gaga's elaborate roleplay". Kheraj noted the video for referencing films such as Fatal Attraction (1987) and The Shining (1980), and compared the negative connotations of mental health to other music videos such as Rihanna's "Disturbia" (2008) and Bebe Rexha's "I'm a Mess" (2018). As of December 2025, the video has over 1 billion views on YouTube.

== Live performances ==
Max performed "Sweet but Psycho" on the January 23, 2019 episode of The Late Late Show with James Corden, which was the song's American television debut. She wore a pearl white corset and tulle skirt that covered her jet-black leather pants while the background lighting alternated between blue and red as four catsuit-wearing dancers performed a synchronized shoulder shrug. On January 25, 2019, Max performed the song on Today. Max wore a red English-style military jacket, black leather pants, and black platform shoes, while the dancers wore black outfits. She appeared on The Ellen DeGeneres Show to perform the song on April 11, 2019, wearing a black outfit with her signature hairstyle while being joined by a group of dancers. Max performed "Sweet but Psycho" and "So Am I" (2019), on the Australian breakfast television show Sunrise on April 29 of that year, marking her debut performance on Australian television.

Max performed the song in a medley with "So Am I" and "Salt" (2019) at the 2019 Wango Tango concert. She wore a green-and-purple long-sleeved outfit that was made by Zemeta, black leather pants, silver Steve Madden stiletto boots, and an iridescent Avec Les Filles trenchcoat. During the pre-show of the 2019 MTV Video Music Awards, Max began her performance with "Torn" (2019) before segueing into "Sweet but Psycho". Max and all the dancers wore silver outfits and gladiator boots while performing a choreographed dance with vocal runs. At the 2019 MTV Europe Music Awards, she performed the song along with "Torn". Max wore a red gown while performing on a white runway, which used "minimalist imagery to maximum effect". She performed "Sweet but Psycho" as the final song in a medley, following "So Am I" and "Torn" at the 2019 Jingle Bell Ball, performing with other artists such as the Script, Rita Ora, Regard and Mabel.

== Track listings ==
Digital download – single
No.	Title	Length
1.	"Sweet but Psycho"	3:07

Digital download – acoustic
No.	Title	Length
1.	"Sweet but Psycho" (Acoustic)	2:59

Digital download – The Remixes
No.	Title	Length
1.	"Sweet but Psycho" (Kat Krazy Remix)	3:09
2.	"Sweet but Psycho" (Elijah Hill Remix)	3:58
3.	"Sweet but Psycho" (Leon Lour Remix)	4:09
4.	"Sweet but Psycho" (Morgan Page Remix)	3:46
5.	"Sweet but Psycho" (Paul Morrell Remix)	3:24
6.	"Sweet but Psycho" (Ricky Retro Remix)	3:05
7.	"Sweet but Psycho" (Majestic Remix)	5:32

Digital Extended play – The Remixes
No.	Title	Length
1.	"Sweet but Psycho" (Kat Krazy Remix)	3:09
2.	"Sweet but Psycho" (Elijah Hill Remix)	3:58
3.	"Sweet but Psycho" (Leon Lour Remix)	4:09
4.	"Sweet but Psycho" (Morgan Page Remix)	3:46
5.	"Sweet but Psycho" (Paul Morrell Remix)	3:24

== Credits and personnel ==
- Amanda Ava Koci – vocals, songwriting
- Henry Walter – songwriting, production, programming, instruments
- Andreas Andresen Haukeland – songwriting
- Madison Love – songwriting
- William Lobban-Bean – songwriting
- Chris Gehringer – mastering
- Serban Ghenea – mixing

Credits adapted from Tidal.

== Charts ==
=== Weekly charts ===
Weekly chart performance for "Sweet but Psycho"
Chart (2018–2020)	Peak position
Argentina Anglo Airplay (Monitor Latino)	15
Australia (ARIA)	2
Austria (Ö3 Austria Top 40)	1
Belgium (Ultratop 50 Flanders)	1
Belgium (Ultratop 50 Wallonia)	1
Bolivia Airplay (Monitor Latino)	2
Brazil International Pop Airplay (Crowley Charts)	9
Bulgaria Airplay (PROPHON)	4
Canada (Canadian Hot 100)	11
Canada AC (Billboard)	33
Canada CHR/Top 40 (Billboard)	3
Canada Hot AC (Billboard)	8
Chile Anglo Airplay (Monitor Latino)	8
China Airplay/FL (Billboard)	12
Colombia Airplay (National-Report)	92
CIS Airplay (TopHit)	5
Costa Rica Anglo Airplay (Monitor Latino)	15
Croatia International Airplay (Top lista)	1
Czech Republic Singles Digital (ČNS IFPI)	1
Denmark (Tracklisten)	1
Dominican Republic Anglo Airplay (Monitor Latino)	5
Ecuador Anglo Airplay (Monitor Latino)	9
El Salvador Anglo Airplay (Monitor Latino)	16
Estonia (Eesti Tipp-40)	1
Euro Digital Songs (Billboard)	1
Finland (Suomen virallinen lista)	1
France (SNEP)	8
Germany (GfK)	1
Global 200 (Billboard)	178
Greece International (IFPI)	12
Hungary (Dance Top 40)	1
Hungary (Rádiós Top 40)	1
Hungary (Single Top 40)	1
Hungary (Stream Top 40)	1
Iceland (Tónlistinn)	1
Ireland (IRMA)	1
Italy (FIMI)	3
Japan Hot Overseas (Billboard)	19
Latin America Anglo Airplay (Monitor Latino)	9
Latvia Streaming (LaIPA)	4
Lithuania (AGATA)	5
Luxembourg Digital (Billboard)	2
Malaysia (RIM)	7
Mexico Airplay (Billboard)	3
Netherlands (Dutch Top 40)	1
Netherlands (Single Top 100)	4
New Zealand (Recorded Music NZ)	1
Norway (VG-lista)	1
Panama Anglo Airplay (Monitor Latino)	10
Poland Airplay (ZPAV)	1
Portugal (AFP)	16
Puerto Rico Airplay (Monitor Latino)	12
Romania (Airplay 100)	2
Russia Airplay (TopHit)	3
Scottish Singles Sales (Official Charts)	1
Singapore (RIAS)	7
Slovakia Airplay (ČNS IFPI)	1
Slovakia Singles Digital (ČNS IFPI)	3
Slovenia Airplay (SloTop50)	1
Spain (Promusicae)	18
Sweden (Sverigetopplistan)	1
Switzerland (Schweizer Hitparade)	1
Ukraine Airplay (TopHit)	4
UK Singles (Official Charts)	1
Uruguay Anglo Airplay (Monitor Latino)	9
US Billboard Hot 100	10
US Adult Contemporary (Billboard)	17
US Adult Pop Airplay (Billboard)	2
US Dance Club Songs (Billboard)	1
US Dance Airplay (Billboard)	4
US Pop Airplay (Billboard)	3
US Rolling Stone Top 100	43
Venezuela Anglo Airplay (Monitor Latino)	4

2023 weekly chart performance
Chart (2023)	Peak position
Hungary (Rádiós Top 40)	28

2025 weekly chart performance
Chart (2025)	Peak position
Finland Airplay (Radiosoittolista)	83

2026 weekly chart performance
Chart (2026)	Peak position
Finland Airplay (Radiosoittolista)	95
Hungary (Rádiós Top 40)	27

=== Monthly charts ===
Monthly chart performance for "Sweet but Psycho"
Chart (2019)	Peak position
Russia Airplay (Tophit)	6
Slovenia Airplay (SloTop50)	1
Ukraine Airplay (Tophit)	1

=== Year-end charts ===
Year-end chart performance for "Sweet but Psycho" in 2018
Chart (2018)	Position
Austria (Ö3 Austria Top 40)	54
Belgium (Ultratop Flanders)	90
Denmark (Tracklisten)	33
Estonia (Eesti Tipp-40)	84
Netherlands (Dutch Top 40)	60
Netherlands (Single Top 100)	73
Norway (VG-lista)	16
Sweden (Sverigetopplistan)	18
Switzerland (Schweizer Hitparade)	79

Year-end chart performance for "Sweet but Psycho" in 2019
Chart (2019)	Position
Australia (ARIA)	15
Austria (Ö3 Austria Top 40)	10
Belgium (Ultratop Flanders)	11
Belgium (Ultratop Wallonia)	8
Bolivia (Monitor Latino)	93
Canada (Canadian Hot 100)	18
CIS (Tophit)	13
Denmark (Tracklisten)	11
France (SNEP)	39
Germany (Official German Charts)	5
Hungary (Dance Top 40)	3
Hungary (Rádiós Top 40)	1
Hungary (Single Top 40)	8
Hungary (Stream Top 40)	3
Iceland (Tónlistinn)	13
Ireland (IRMA)	18
Italy (FIMI)	16
Netherlands (Dutch Top 40)	21
Netherlands (Single Top 100)	27
New Zealand (Recorded Music NZ)	18
Poland (ZPAV)	17
Portugal (AFP)	61
Puerto Rico (Monitor Latino)	42
Romania (Airplay 100)	17
Russia (Top All Media Hits, Tophit)	31
Russia (Top Radio Hits, Tophit)	24
Slovenia (SloTop50)	1
Sweden (Sverigetopplistan)	29
Switzerland (Schweizer Hitparade)	7
Ukraine Airplay (Tophit)	20
UK Singles (Official Charts Company)	6
US Billboard Hot 100	23
US Adult Contemporary (Billboard)	42
US Adult Top 40 (Billboard)	15
US Dance Club Songs (Billboard)	7
US Dance/Mix Show Airplay (Billboard)	25
US Mainstream Top 40 (Billboard)	15
US Rolling Stone Top 100	46

Year-end chart performance for "Sweet but Psycho" in 2020
Chart (2020)	Position
Hungary (Dance Top 40)	11
Hungary (Rádiós Top 40)	58

=== Decade-end charts ===
Decade-end chart performance for "Sweet but Psycho"
Chart (2010–2019)	Position
Austria (Ö3 Austria Top 40)	50
Norway (VG-lista)	17

== Certifications ==
Certifications and sales for "Sweet but Psycho"
Region	Certification	Certified units/sales
Australia (ARIA)	5× Platinum	350,000^{‡}
Austria (IFPI Austria)	3× Platinum	90,000^{‡}
Belgium (BRMA)	2× Platinum	80,000^{‡}
Brazil (Pro-Música Brasil)	2× Diamond	320,000^{‡}
Canada (Music Canada)	7× Platinum	560,000^{‡}
Denmark (IFPI Danmark)	3× Platinum	270,000^{‡}
France (SNEP)	Diamond	333,333^{‡}
Germany (BVMI)	Diamond	1,000,000^{‡}
Italy (FIMI)	3× Platinum	150,000^{‡}
Netherlands (NVPI)	2× Platinum	160,000^{‡}
New Zealand (RMNZ)	6× Platinum	180,000^{‡}
Norway (IFPI Norway)	9× Platinum	540,000^{‡}
Poland (ZPAV)	Diamond	100,000^{‡}
Portugal (AFP)	2× Platinum	20,000^{‡}
Singapore (RIAS)	Gold	5,000^{*}
Spain (Promusicae)	2× Platinum	120,000^{‡}
Switzerland (IFPI Switzerland)	4× Platinum	80,000^{‡}
United Kingdom (BPI)	5× Platinum	3,000,000^{‡}
United States (RIAA)	4× Platinum	4,000,000^{‡}
^{*} Sales figures based on certification alone.^{‡} Sales+streaming figures based on certification alone.

== Release history ==
Release dates and formats for "Sweet but Psycho"
Region	Date	Format(s)	Version	Label(s)	Ref.
Various	August 17, 2018	Digital download; streaming	Original	Atlantic	
Various	October 5, 2018	Digital download; streaming	Paul Morrell remix	Atlantic	
Italy	October 15, 2018	Radio airplay	Original	Warner	
Various	November 1, 2018	Digital download; streaming	Acoustic	Atlantic	
Various	November 29, 2018	Digital download; streaming	Morgan Page remix	Atlantic	
Various	December 14, 2018	Digital download; streaming	Leon Lour remix	Atlantic	
United States	January 14, 2019	AC radio; hot AC radio; modern AC radio	Original	Atlantic	
Various	January 31, 2019	Digital download; streaming	Remixes (Note: The remixes EP released on January 31, 2019, featured three previously released remixes, alongside renditions by Kat Krazy and Elijah Hill. The remixes EP released on March 4, 2019, added remixes by Ricky Retro and Majestic.)	Atlantic	
Various	March 4, 2019	Digital download; streaming	Remixes	Atlantic	

== See also ==
- List of Billboard Hot 100 top-ten singles in 2019
- List of number-one dance singles of 2019 (U.S.)
- List of number-one hits of 2018 (Austria)
- List of number-one hits of 2018 (Denmark)
- List of number-one hits of 2018 (Germany)
- List of number-one hits of 2018 (Switzerland)
- List of number-one hits of 2019 (Austria)
- List of number-one hits of 2019 (Denmark)
- List of number-one hits of 2019 (Germany)
- List of number-one hits of 2019 (Switzerland)
- List of number-one singles from the 2010s (New Zealand)
- List of number-one singles of 2018 (Finland)
- List of number-one singles of 2018 (Ireland)
- List of number-one singles of 2019 (Finland)
- List of number-one singles of 2019 (Ireland)
- List of number-one singles of 2019 (Poland)
- List of number-one singles of 2019 (Slovenia)
- List of number-one singles of the 2010s (Hungary)
- List of number-one singles of the 2010s (Sweden)
- List of number-one songs in Norway
- List of number-one songs of the 2010s (Czech Republic)
- List of UK Singles Chart number ones of the 2010s
- List of Ultratop 50 number-one singles of 2018
- List of Ultratop 50 number-one singles of 2019
