= List of number-one albums of 2018 (Finland) =

This is the complete list of number-one albums in Finland in 2018 according to the Official Finnish Charts compiled by Musiikkituottajat – IFPI Finland. The chart is based on sales of physical and digital albums as well as music streaming.

== Chart history ==
Physical and digital albums
Week	Album	Artist(s)	Reference(s)
Week 1	Popkorni	JVG	
Week 2	Popkorni	JVG	
Week 3	Popkorni	JVG	
Week 4	Popkorni	JVG	
Week 5	Popkorni	JVG	
Week 6	Nuorena jaksaa	Aleksanteri Hakaniemi	
Week 7	Alkuteos	CMX	
Week 8	Valmis	Kasmir	
Week 9	Tapa poika	Pyhimys	
Week 10	Tapa poika	Pyhimys	
Week 11	Decades	Nightwish	
Week 12	Tapa poika	Pyhimys	
Week 13	Lohtulauseita	Vesta	
Week 14	Lohtulauseita	Vesta	
Week 15	Lohtulauseita	Vesta	
Week 16	Kuka näkee sut	Juha Tapio	
Week 17	Kuka näkee sut	Juha Tapio	
Week 18	Beerbongs & Bentleys	Post Malone	
Week 19	Beerbongs & Bentleys	Post Malone	
Week 20	Beerbongs & Bentleys	Post Malone	
Week 21	Queen of Time	Amorphis	
Week 22	Hengen pitimet	Mokoma	
Week 23	Prequelle	Ghost	
Week 24	Ääripäät	Mikael Gabriel	
Week 25	Kaikki on hyvin	Paperi T	
Week 26	Simba	Lukas Leon	
Week 27	Scorpion	Drake	
Week 28	Simba	Lukas Leon	
Week 29	Kaikki on hyvin	Paperi T	
Week 30	Simba	Lukas Leon	
Week 31	Simba	Lukas Leon	
Week 32	Mamma Mia! Here We Go Again	Various artists	
Week 33	Nälkäinen sydän	Anna Puu	
Week 34	Sweetener	Ariana Grande	
Week 35	Timantit on ikuisia	Cheek	
Week 36	Kamikaze	Eminem	
Week 37	Monologi	Jenni Vartiainen	
Week 38	Universal Satan	Turmion Kätilöt	
Week 39	Valtatie 666	Kotiteollisuus	
Week 40	Aikuisilta kielletty	Klamydia	
Week 41	Ultraviolet	Poets of the Fall	
Week 42	Taival	Stam1na	
Week 43	Sä kuljetat mua	J. Karjalainen	
Week 44	Jano	Gasellit	
Week 45	Jano	Gasellit	
Week 46	Come Over When You're Sober, Pt. 2	Lil Peep	
Week 47	Jano	Gasellit	
Week 48	Sydämeni joulu	Waltteri Torikka	
Week 49	Dummy Boy	6ix9ine	
Week 50	Sydämeni joulu	Waltteri Torikka	
Week 51	Sydämeni joulu	Waltteri Torikka	
Week 52	Different World	Alan Walker	

== See also ==
- List of number-one singles of 2018 (Finland)
