= APRA Music Awards of 2013 =

Annual Australian music awards

- Date: 17 June 2013
- Location: Sydney Convention and Exhibition Centre
- Hosted by: Missy Higgins, Jonathan Biggins
- Website: apra-amcos.com.au/2012APRAMusicAwards/index.html

The Australasian Performing Right Association Awards of 2013 (generally known as APRA Awards) are a series of related awards which include the APRA Music Awards, Art Music Awards, and Screen Music Awards. The APRA Music Awards of 2013 was the 31st annual ceremony by the Australasian Performing Right Association (APRA) and the Australasian Mechanical Copyright Owners Society (AMCOS) to award outstanding achievements in contemporary songwriting, composing and publishing. The ceremony was held on 17 June 2013 at the Melbourne Convention and Exhibition Centre.

The Art Music Awards were distributed on 26 August at the NIDA Parade Theatre, Sydney. They are sponsored by APRA and the Australian Music Centre (AMC) to "recognise achievement in the composition, performance, education and presentation of Australian music". The Screen Music Awards were issued on 9 December by APRA and Australian Guild of Screen Composers (AGSC), which "acknowledges excellence and innovation in the genre of screen composition".

On 23 May nominations for the APRA Music Awards were announced on multiple news sources, with Matthew Calwell aka 360 being the most nominated artist. Hosts for the 2013 APRA Music Awards were Clare Bowditch and Jonathan Biggins. A total of 14 awards were presented. The Seekers were honoured with the Ted Albert Award for Outstanding Services to Australian Music. Gotye (aka Wally de Backer), Tame Impala and Sia were described by the Australian Recording Industry Association as "big winners". The APRA Music Awards ceremony highlights were broadcast on the MAX network on 26 June 2013.

== Presenters ==
At the APRA Music Awards, aside from the hosts, Clare Bowditch and Jonathan Biggins, the presenters were Gotye, Jenny Morris, Bert Newton and Michael Gudinski.

== Performances ==
The APRA Music Awards ceremony showcased performances by:

- Architecture in Helsinki
- Jessica Mauboy
- British India
- Ball Park Music

== APRA Music Awards ==
=== Blues & Roots Work of the Year ===
Title and/or artist	Writer(s)	Publisher(s)	Result
"Black Dog Blues" – Russell Morris	James Keays, Russell Morris	—N/a	Nominated
"The Devil's Sake" – Lanie Lane	Lanie Lane	Mushroom Music Pty Ltd	Nominated
"Like Me Meaner" – Lanie Lane	Lanie Lane	Mushroom Music Pty Ltd	Nominated
"Longtime" – Ash Grunwald	Ash Grunwald	Mushroom Music Pty Ltd	Won
"Love Letter" – Clairy Browne & The Bangin' Rackettes	Clairy Browne, Darcy McNulty, Steve Schram	Native Tongue Music Publishing	Nominated

=== Breakthrough Songwriter of the Year ===
Title and/or artist	Writer(s)	Publisher(s)	Result
DNA	Anthony Egizii, David Musumecia	EMI Publishing Australia Pty Ltd	Nominated
Drapht	David Rankine, Paul Ridge	Sony/ATV Music Publishing Australia Pty Ltd obo Blue Max Music Publishing / Kobalt Music Publishing Australia Pty Ltd	Nominated
360, Styalz Fuego	Matthew Colwell, Kaelyn Behr	Universal Music Publishing Pty Ltd, Sony/ATV Music Publishing Australia P/L	Won
Alpine	Phoebe Baker, Louisa James, Ryan Lamb, Christian O'Brien, Timothy Royall, Phillip Tucker	Mushroom Music Pty Ltd	Nominated
Seth Sentry	Seth Marton, Stephen Mowat	Sony/ATV Music Publishing Australia Pty Ltd	Nominated
Yung Warriors	Tjimba Possum-Burns, Danny Ramzan	—N/a	Nominated

=== Country Work of the Year ===
Title and/or artist	Writer(s)	Publisher(s)	Result
"Charlestown Road" – Catherine Britt	Catherine Britt	Mushroom Music Pty Ltd	Nominated
"Country Is" – Troy Cassar-Daley	Colin Buchanan, Troy Cassar-Daley	Universal Music Publishing Pty Ltd / Mushroom Music Pty Ltd	Nominated
"Country Proud" – McAlister Kemp	Troy Kemp, Drew McAlister, Steven Tassone	ABC Music Publishing, Mushroom Music Pty Ltd obo Ole Media Management LP I	Nominated
"Piece of Me" – The McClymonts	Samantha McClymont, Frank Myers, Lindsay Rimes	EMI Music Publishing Australia Pty Ltd / Mushroom Music Pty Ltd	Won
"Waitress" – Beccy Cole	Beccy Cole	ABC Music Publishing	Nominated

=== Dance Work of the Year ===
Title and/or artist	Writer(s)	Publisher(s)	Result
"Coming Alive" – Vandalism & Ikid	Ilan Kidron, Andrew Van Dorsselaer, Cassandra Van Dorsselaer	Kobalt Music Publishing Australia Pty Ltd	Nominated
"Feed Off Me" – The Potbelleez	David Greene, Ilan Kidron, Marisa Lock, Paul Mac, Jonathan Murphy, Justin Shave	Universal Music Publishing Pty Ltd obo MCDJ Music, Universal Music Publishing Pty Ltd	Nominated
"In My Mind" – Feenixpawl & Ivan Gough featuring Georgi Kay	Aden Forte, Ivan Gough, Georgi Kay, Joshua Soon	Sony / ATV Music Publishing Australia Pty Ltd / Mushroom Music Pty Ltd obo Meleva Music	Won
"Like a Girl in Love" – Elen Levon	Jamie Appleby, Melinda Appleby	Universal Music Publishing MGB Australia	Nominated
"Really Want to See You Again" – Sneaky Sound System	Angus McDonald, Connie Mitchell	—N/a	Nominated

=== International Work of the Year ===
Title and/or artist	Writer(s)	Publisher(s)	Result
"Call Me Maybe" – Carly Rae Jepsen	Tavish Crowe, Carly Rae Jepsen, Joshua Ramsay	Crowe Music Publishing / Universal/MCA Music Publishing Pty Ltd obo Jepsen Music Publishing	Won
"Lego House" – Ed Sheeran	Jake Gosling, Christopher Leonard, Edward Sheeran	David Platz Music (Australia) Pty Ltd obo BDI Music Limited / Warner/Chappell Music Australia Pty Ltd obo Warner/Chappell Music Publishing Limited / Sony/ATV Music Publishing Australia P/L obo Sony/ATV Music Publishing (UK) Limited	Nominated
"Lonely Boy" – The Black Keys	Dan Auerbach, Patrick Carney, Brian Burton	Gaga Music Pty Ltd obo McMoore McLesst Publishing / Universal Music Publishing Pty Ltd obo Sweet	Nominated
"Paradise" – Coldplay	Guy Berryman, Jonathan Buckland, William Champion, Brian Eno, Chris Martin	Universal Music Publishing MGB Australia obo Universal Music Publishing MGB Limited / Frankdon Music Pty Ltd obo Opal Music (GB 1)	Nominated
"We Are Young" – Fun featuring Janelle Monáe	Jack Antonoff, Jeffrey Bhaske, Andrew Dost, Nathaniel Ruess	Sony/ATV Music Publishing Australia P/L obo Shira Lee Lawrence Rick Music / Sony/ATV Music Publishing Australia P/L obo Way Above Music / Sony/ATV Music Publishing Australia P/L obo Rough Art / Warner/Chappell Music Australia Pty Ltd obo WB Music Corp, Bearvon Music and FBR Music	Nominated

=== Most Played Australian Work ===
Title and/or artist	Writer(s)	Publisher(s)	Result
"Boys like You" – 360 featuring Gossling	Kaelyn Behr, Matthew Colwell, Francis Jones, Bradford Pinto, Jack Revens	Sony/ATV Music Publishing Australia P/L / Universal Music Publishing Pty Ltd	Nominated
"Don't Worry Be Happy" – Guy Sebastian	Guy Sebastian	Universal Music Publishing Pty Ltd	Nominated
"I Love It" – Hilltop Hoods featuring Sia	Barry Francis, Matthew Lambert, Daniel Smith, Sia Furler	Sony?ATV Music Publishing Australia Pty Ltd, EMI Music Publishing Australia Pty Ltd obo EMI Music Publishing Ltd	Nominated
"Set It Off" – Timomatic	Anthony Egizii, David Musumeci, Tim Omaji	EMI Music Publishing Australia Pty Ltd	Won
"Sitting on Top of the World" – Delta Goodrem	Delta Goodrem, John Shanks	Sony/ATV Music Publishing Australia P/L / Sony/ATV Music Publishing Australia P/L obo Tone Ranger Music and Native Tongue Music Publishing obo Imagem Music NL	Nominated

=== Most Played Australia Work Overseas ===
Title and/or artist	Writer(s)	Publisher(s)	Result
"Somebody That I Used To Know" – Gotye featuring Kimbra	Wally de Backer, Luiz Bonfa	J Albert and Son Pty Ltd obo Op Shop Songs Pty Ltd and Kobalt Music Publishing Australia P/L, Warner/Chappell Music Australia Pty Ltd	Won

=== Rock Work of the Year ===
Title and/or artist	Writer(s)	Publisher(s)	Result
"Follow the Sun" – Evermore	Daniel Hume, Jon Hume, Peter Hume	Sony/ATV Music Publishing Australia P/L obo Second Pressing Pty Ltd	Nominated
"For Another Day" – The Living End	Chris Cheney	Universal Music Publishing Pty Ltd	Nominated
"My Gun" – The Rubens	Scott Baldwin, Elliott Margin, Izaac Margin, Samuel Margin, David Kahne	Mushroom Music Pty Ltd / Kobalt Music Publishing Australia P/L obo E Equals Music	Won
"Passerby" – Grinspoon	Pat Davern, Phil Jamieson	EMI Music Publishing Australia Pty Ltd	Nominated
"This Fire" – Birds of Tokyo	Ian Berney, Ian Kenny, Glen Sarangapany, Adam Spark, Adam Weston	Mushroom Music Pty Ltd	Nominated

=== Song of the Year ===
Title and/or artist	Writer(s)	Publisher(s)	Result
"Elephant" – Tame Impala	Kevin Parker, Jay Watson	Sony/ATV Music Publishing Australia P/L	Nominated
"Feels Like We Only Go Backwards" – Tame Impala	Kevin Parker	Sony/ATV Music Publishing Australia P/L	Won
"Get Along" – Guy Sebastian	Guy Sebastian	Universal Music Publishing Pty Ltd	Nominated
"History Eraser" – Courtney Barnett	Courtney Barnett	—N/a	Nominated
"When the Moment Comes" – Mia Dyson	Mia Dyson	—N/a	Nominated

=== Urban Work of the Year ===
Title and/or artist	Writer(s)	Publisher(s)	Result
"Boys Like You" – 360 featuring Gossling	Kaelyn Behr, Matthew Colwell, Francis Jones, Bradford Pinto, Jack Revens	Sony/ATV Music Publishing Australia P/L/ Universal Music Publishing Pty Ltd	Nominated
"Child" – 360	Kaelyn Behr, Matthew Colwell	Sony/ATV Music Publishing Australia P/L/ Universal Music Publishing Pty Ltd	Nominated
"I Love It" – Hilltop Hoods featuring Sia	Barry Francis, Matthew Lambert, Daniel Smith, Sia Furler	Sony/ATV Music Publishing Australia P/L / EMI Music Publishing Australia Pty Ltd obo EMI Music Publishing Ltd	Won
"In My Mind (Part 2)" – Flo Rida	Tramar Dillard, Aden Forte, Ivan Gough, Georgi Kay, Joshua Soon	Sony/ATV Music Publishing Australia P/L obo Sony/ATV Tunes LLC, Sony/ATV Music Publishing Australia P/L, Sony/ATV Music Publ Allegro (AUST) P/L obo PeppermintBlue Publishing	Nominated
"Speaking in Tongues" – Hilltop Hoods featuring Chali 2na	Barry Francis, Matthew Lambert, Daniel Smith, Charles Stewart	Sony, ATV Music Publishing Australia Pty Ltd	Nominated

=== Songwriter of the Year ===
- Sia

=== Ted Albert Award for Outstanding Services to Australian Music ===
- The Seekers

== Art Music Awards ==
=== Work of the Year – Instrumental ===
Title	Composer	Performer	Result
Bright Birds	Damian Barbeler	Stephen Emmerson and Sonya Lifschitz	Nominated
Dark Nebulae	Lachlan Skipworth	Khasm Quartet	Nominated
Falling	Mary Finsterer	Paul Grabowsky and Gabriella Smart	Nominated
"String Quintet"	Gordon Kerry	Kuss Quartet with Naoko Shimizu	Won

=== Work of the Year – Jazz ===
Title	Composer	Performer	Result
Anda Two	Marc Hannaford	The Marc Hannaford Trio	Won
Meditations on Light	Andrea Keller	Andrea Keller Quartet and No Tango Quartet	Nominated
Meetings at the Table of Time	Sandy Evans	Members of the Australian Art Orchestra and the Sruthi Laya Ensemble	Nominated
The World Rushes On	Alice Humphries	Ecila Ensemble	Nominated

=== Work of the Year – Orchestral ===
Title	Composer	Performer	Result
Blitz	Andrew Ford	Tasmanian Symphony Orchestra, Marko Letonja (conductor)	Nominated
Fire Music	Brett Dean	Adelaide Symphony Orchestra, Brett Dean (conductor)	Won
Full Moon Dances	Ross Edwards	Sydney Symphony, Miguel Harth-Bedoya (conductor), Amy Dickson (saxophone)	Nominated
Piano Concerto No 2	Carl Vine	Sydney Symphony, Hugh Wolff (conductor), Piers Lane (piano)	Nominated

=== Work of the Year – Vocal or Choral ===
Title	Composer / librettist	Performer	Result
Conversations with Ghosts	James Ledger, Dan Kelly, Paul Kelly, Emily Dickinson, Norman MacCaig, Les Murray, Kenneth Slessor, Lord Alfred Tennyson, Judith Wright, W.B. Yeats	Paul Kelly, James Ledger, Genevieve Lacey and musicians from Australian National Academy of Music	Nominated
The Domestic Sublime	Katy Abbott, Chris Wallace-Crabbe	Greta Bradman (soprano), Leigh Harrold (piano)	Nominated
Heritage in Song	Stephen Leek, Lyn Williams, Andrew Walsh	Sydney Children's Choir, Lyn Williams (conductor)	Won
We Apologise	Robert Davidson	The Australian Voices, Gordon Hamilton (conductor)	Nominated

=== Performance of the Year ===
Title	Composer / librettist	Performer	Result
Bénédiction d'un conquérant: for Symphony Orchestra	Andrián Pertout	Jerusalem Symphony Orchestra, Frederic Chaslin (conductor)	Nominated
The Drumfire was incessant, and continued all night with unabated fury...	Andrew Harrison	Zubin Kanga	Nominated
Im Winde	Gordon Kerry	Trio Dali	Nominated
Meetings at the Table of Time	Sandy Evans	Members of the Australian Art Orchestra and the Sruthi Laya Ensemble	Won

=== Award for Excellence by an Individual ===
Individual	Work	Result
Cat Hope	Supporting and growing new music in Western Australia	Nominated
Danielle Bentley	Dedication and commitment to Australian art music and chamber music	Won
David Young	20 years of commissioning, curating and producing new Australian art music	Nominated
Zubin Kanga	Spectrum	Nominated

=== Award for Excellence by an Organisation ===
Organisation	Work	Result
Acacia Quartet	Blue Silence	Nominated
Soundstream	Adelaide New Music Festival	Won
Speak Percussion	2012 Artistic Program	Nominated
Tura New Music and the Australian Chamber Orchestra	Reef Tour 2012	Nominated

=== Award for Excellence in Music Education ===
Organisation / individual	Work	Result
Gondwana Choirs	Choral Training Programs 2012	Nominated
James Humberstone	Cycles & Circles education program	Nominated
New England Conservatorium of Music	New England Sings!	Won
Speak Percussion	2012 education programs	Nominated

=== Award for Excellence in a Regional Area ===
Organisation / individual	Work	Result
Gondwana Choirs	Cairns Gondwana Indigenous Children's Choir	Nominated
Tammy Brennan, Sofie Loizou, Barton Staggs	Confined	Nominated
Tura New Music and the Australian Chamber Orchestra	Reef Tour 2012	Nominated
The Wired Lab and Country Arts South Australia	Southern Encounter	Won

=== Award for Excellence in Experimental Music ===
Organisation / individual	Work	Result
Daniel Blinkhorn	frostbYte – triptych	Nominated
Decibel	2012 Program	Nominated
Super Critical Mass	2012 activities	Nominated
The Wired Lab and Country Arts South Australia	Southern Encounter	Won

=== Award for Excellence in Jazz ===
Organisation / individual	Work	Result
Jamie Oehlers	Recording, touring and educational achievements in 2012	Won
Jeremy Rose	Excellence in Jazz	Nominated
Quentin Angus	Composition, performance and career development	Nominated
Trichotomy	Compositional performance and recording projects	Nominated

=== Distinguished Services to Australian Music ===
Organisation / individual	Result
George Dreyfus	Won

== Screen Music Awards ==
=== International Achievement Award ===
Organisation / individual	Result
John Polson	Won

=== Feature Film Score of the Year ===
Title	Composer	Result
Dead Europe	Jed Kurzel	Nominated
The Rocket	Caitlin Yeo	Won
Samsara	Lisa Gerrard, Marcello De Francisci, Michael Stearns	Nominated
The 25th Reich	Ricky Edwards	Nominated

=== Best Music for an Advertisement ===
Title	Composer	Result
Devondale Milk – "Crazy Cat Lady"	David Barber	Nominated
Shibui – "Shibui Hands"	Erin McKimm	Won
Coca-Cola – "Small World Machines"	Adrian Sergovich	Nominated
Heineken – "Tiger Beer: Rise of the Megacity"	Dan Higson, Ant Smith, Nick West	Nominated

=== Best Music for Children's Television ===
Title	Composer	Result
Destiny	Henrique Dib	Nominated
Flea Bitten	Christopher Elves	Won
Giggle and Hoot: The Gigglearium Special	Sean Peter	Nominated
The Alien Boy	Henrique Dib	Nominated

=== Best Music for a Documentary ===
Title	Composer	Result
Artscape: Polly Borland - Polymorphous	Ryan Walsh	Nominated
The A-Z of Contemporary Art	Michael Lira	Won
Red Obsession	Amanda Brown, Burkhard Dallwitz	Nominated
Yagan	Ash Gibson Greig	Nominated

=== Best Music for a Mini-Series or Telemovie ===
Title	Composer	Result
Dangerous Remedy	Guy Gross	Nominated
Devil's Dust	Matteo Zingales	Nominated
The Mystery of a Hansom Cab	Cezary Skubiszewski	Won
Underground: The Julian Assange Story	François Tétaz	Nominated

=== Best Music for a Short Film ===
Title	Composer	Result
Catch Perfect	Jonathan Dreyfus	Won
Great Adventures	Christopher Elves	Nominated
Melbhattan	Biddy Connor	Nominated
The Mirror	Henrique Dib	Nominated

=== Best Music for a Television Series or Serial ===
Series or Serial	Episode title	Composer	Result
Puberty Blues	"Episode 1"	Stephen Rae	Nominated
Rake	"Season 2 Episode 8: Greene"	Michael Lira, David McCormack, Antony Partos	Nominated
Redfern Now	"Episode 4: Stand Up"	Michael Lira, David McCormack	Won
Underbelly: Badness	"Episode 5: Troubleshooting	Burkhard Dallwitz	Nominated

=== Best Original Song Composed for the Screen ===
Song title	Work	Composer	Result
"Begin Again"	Call Me Crazy	Daniel Frankel, Gideon Frankel, Jessica Paige, Alex Wurman	Nominated
"Fallen Dreams"	Reverse Runner	Thomas E Rouch	Nominated
"Lonely Child"	Redfern Now	David McCormack, Antony Partos	Won
"On a Mini Adventure"	Giggle & Hoot	Cain Horton, Paul Kingston	Nominated

=== Best Soundtrack Album ===
Title	Composer	Result
Black Water	Rafael May	Won
The Journey	Piotr Nowotnik	Nominated
Storm Surfers 3D	Richard Tognetti, Michael Yezerski	Nominated
Woody	Josh Abrahams, Davide Carbone, Russell Thornton	Nominated

=== Best Television Theme ===
Title	Composer	Result
101 East – "Australia's Lost Generation"	Vicki Hansen	Nominated
The Checkout	Drew Crawford	Nominated
The Doctor Blake Mysteries	Dale Cornelius	Won
Redfern Now	David McCormack, Antony Partos	Nominated

=== Most Performed Screen Composer – Australia ===
Composer	Result
Adam Gock, Dinesh Wicks	Nominated
Jay Stewart	Won
Neil Sutherland	Nominated
Nick Perjanik	Nominated

=== Most Performed Screen Composer – Overseas ===
Composer	Result
Adam Gock, Dinesh Wicks	Nominated
David Hirschfelder	Nominated
Neil Sutherland	Won
Ric Formosa, Ricky Edwards	Nominated
