= Georgi Kay =

- Born: 15 March 1993 (age 33)
- Origin: Ascot, Berkshire, England
- Genre: Electronic indie pop
- Occupation: Singer/songwriter
- Instruments: Vocals, guitar, keyboards
- Years active: 2010–present
- Labels: Parlophone, Warner, MONOKI
- Website: www.georgikay.com

Georgina Kristine Noelle Kingsley (born 15 March 1993 in Ascot, Berkshire), most commonly known by their stage name Georgi Kay, is an English-born Australian indie pop singer, currently based in Los Angeles.

== Biography ==
Georgi Kay began playing lead guitar for rock group, The Vains, at the age of fourteen. Within a year they also took on the lead vocal duties. By 2009, Kay was playing solo shows and recording some of their original material for release.

Kay released their debut EP, Strange Things in March 2010.

In 2010, Kay became the youngest ever winner of the WAM Song of the Year Award, winning in 2010 with "Breakfast in Bedlam". In 2011 Kay won another WAM Song of the Year Award for their collaboration "Free" with The Stoops.

In May 2011 Kay released their debut album, Backwardsforwards.

Kay wrote and featured on the track "In My Mind", released on Axtone Records in January 2012, in collaboration with Australian house music producers Feenixpawl and Ivan Gough. Flo Rida released a remix titled "In My Mind, Part II". The track marks Kay's first appearance on a major label international album. "In My Mind" was chosen by KIA Motors for their 2013 US advertising campaign titled "Bringing Down The House" and the launch video made its debut on over 18,000 movie screens during the MTV Video Music Awards on 6 September.

In February 2012, Kay played the role of Melissa in the Jane Campion directed television miniseries, Top of the Lake, filmed in Otago, New Zealand. In the penultimate episode, they perform a cover of the song "Jóga" by Björk, and in the final episode one of their own original songs, "Ipswich".

At the ARIA Music Awards of 2012, "In My Mind" won the ARIA Award for Best Dance Release. At the APRA Music Awards of 2013, "In My Mind" won Dance Work of the Year.

In December 2014, Kay wrote, produced and recorded "Head Full of Lies" as the theme music for the opening/closing credits for the three-part Netflix dystopian miniseries Residue. At the ARIA Music Awards of 2015, "Head Full of Lies" was nominated for Best Original Song Composed for the Screen.

In December 2015, they released the single "God of a Girl" from their EP Origins. In February 2016 they released the single "More Than This". Origins was released in February 2016.

In 2017, Kay wrote, produced and recorded "Mark VI" in collaboration with Charles Scott IV as the theme music/closing credits for Sleight, the American science fiction drama film about a street magician in Los Angeles. The film, directed by J. D. Dillard, written by Dillard and Alex Theurer and starring Jacob Latimore, Seychelle Gabriel, Dulé Hill, Storm Reid, Sasheer Zamata and Michael Villar. The film was released on 28 April 2017, by WWE Studios and Blumhouse Tilt. The film received mixed reviews from critics and grossed $4 million worldwide, against its $250,000 budget.

In early 2018, Kay wrote, recorded and produced the track "Lone Wolf" in Los Angeles. In November 2018, the album Where I Go to Disappear was released.

== Personal life ==
Kay is non-binary, using they/them pronouns, and is gay.

== Discography ==
=== Albums ===
List of albums, with release date and label shown
Title	Details
Backwardsforwards	Released: May 2011; Formats: CD, digital download
Where I Go to Disappear	Released: 2 November 2018; Label: Monoki Records (MON001); Formats: CD, digital download, LP

=== Extended plays ===
List of EPs, with release date and label shown
Title	Details
Strange Things	Released: March 2010; Formats: CD, digital download
In My Mind EP	Released: May 2013; Label: Monoki Records / Regal (REG 178); Formats: CD, digital download, LP
Origins	Released: 5 February 2016; Label: Monoki Records; Formats: digital download

=== Singles ===
==== As lead artist ====
Title	Year	Album
"Breakfast in Bedlam"	2010	
"Lionheart"	2010	
"Ipswich"	2013	In My Mind EP
"Head Full of Lies"	2015	
"God of a Girl"	2015	Origins
"More Than This"	2016	Origins
"Scary People"	2017	Where I Go to Disappear
"Guilty Pleasures"	2017	Where I Go to Disappear
"Lone Wolf"	2018	Where I Go to Disappear
"Gasoline"	2018	
"Medicine"	2020	
"All Over Again"	2021	

==== As featured artist ====
Title	Year	Other performer(s)	Album
"Free"	2011	The Stoops	Non-album single
"In My Mind (Axwell Mix)"	2012	Ivan Gough, Feenixpawl	Until Now
"In My Mind (Part 2)"	2012	Flo Rida	Wild Ones
"Follow Me"	2015	Brodinski	Brava
"Give Me a Sign"	2016	Lipless	Wake up Call EP
"Let You Go"	2017	Matt Nash	Non-album single
"Dreams"	2018	Feenixpaul, Sheco	Non-album single
"All Yours"	2026	Crooked Colours	Dirt Road Gold

== Awards and nominations ==
=== APRA Awards ===
The APRA Awards are presented annually from 1982 by the Australasian Performing Right Association (APRA), "honouring composers and songwriters".

Year	Nominee / work	Award	Result
2013	"In My Mind" (Aden Forte, Ivan Gough, Georgi Kay, Joshua Soon)	Dance Work of the Year	Won
2013	"In My Mind (Part 2)" (Tramar Dillard, Aden Forte, Ivan Gough, Georgi Kay, Joshua Soon) (performed by Flo Rida)	Urban Work of the Year	Nominated
2015	"Head Full of Lies" (Georgi Kay, James Earp) (for Residue)	Best Original Song Composed for the Screen	Nominated

=== ARIA Music Awards ===
The ARIA Music Awards is an annual awards ceremony that recognises excellence, innovation, and achievement across all genres of Australian music.

Year	Nominee / work	Award	Result
2012	"In My Mind" by Ivan Gough and Feenixpawl featuring Georgi Kay	Best Dance Release	Won

=== WAM Song of the Year ===
The WAM Song of the Year was formed by the Western Australian Rock Music Industry Association Inc. (WARMIA) in 1985, with its main aim to develop and run annual awards recognising achievements within the music industry in Western Australia.

Year	Nominee / work	Award	Result (wins only)
2010	"Breakfast in Bedlam"	Schools 15–17 Yrs	Won
2010	"Breakfast in Bedlam"	Grand Prize	Won
2011	"Free (The Stoops featuring Georgi Kay)	Urban / Hip Hop	Won
