= Ivan Gough =

Australian house music producer and DJ (born 1969)

- Gough with Luke Chable as Digital Mind Control

Background information
- Also known as: The Traveller; Van Gough
- Born: 19 May 1969 (age 56); Melbourne, Victoria, Australia
- Genres: House; progressive house
- Occupations: Producer; songwriter; DJ
- Years active: 1994–present
- Labels: Axtone; Neon

Ivan Gough (born 19 May 1969) is an Australian house music producer and DJ.

His first release, a remix of Pendulums "I Need You" became an instant club anthem, being played by the likes of Paul Oakenfold and Pete Tong in the United Kingdom. He released various tracks throughout the late 1990s and was an influential producer in the Melbourne underground scene working with "Zero Tolerance" recordings running their CBD studio. In 2004, he and fellow Melbourne DJ Grant Smillie began the production outfit TV Rock and toured with the Future Music Festival in 2010. Gough left TV Rock early in 2013 to pursue solo projects.

== Musical career ==
Gough was raised in the Melbourne suburb of Wonga Park on the edge of the Yarra Valley. He attended Yarra Valley Grammar, where he discovered an interest in music production through listening to a school mates cassette tape edits. After visiting a studio in 1989, he became interested in production and began collecting synthesizers and drum machines. After a chance meeting with an old school mate, he began to DJ in and around Melbourne's club scene, whilst producing tracks during the day. Over the years Gough's records have made it into the playlists of the world's best DJs like old school legends Sasha and Paul Oakenfold, and the more recent class of top DJs like The Swedish House Mafia and Tiesto. Gough's records have also been getting regular plays on Pete Tong's influential Radio 1 show 'the essential selection' in the UK, with one of his TV Rock remixes (with Smillie) getting the coveted 'essential new tune'. He also has more releases (and remixes) to his name than any other Australian, with dozens of records and cds bearing his name. Over the years Gough has produced Progressive house, deep house, trance, electro and breaks, making arguably the first nu school breaks record in Australia with Phil K and Andy Page in 1997. He also ran the studio and produced for respected Australian Deep House label Zero Tolerance from 1999 to 2004. More recently he has turned his hand to writing and producing Big room house.

In 2005 the song "Someday", co-written by Gough with Slinkee Minx and performed by Slinkee Minx, reached No. 55 on the Aria Charts and No. 9 on the Aria Dance Charts.

As TV Rock with Grant Smillie, Gough has had 11 No.1 dance tracks on the ARIA club chart, more than anyone else, and in 2006 their smash hit "Flaunt It" broke all the records. "Flaunt It" was the No. 1 highest selling dance single by any Australian Artist in 2006. and the No. 2 highest selling Australian track in 2006.

The duo garnished 2 ARIA's for the track, selling more than 175,000 copies and going double platinum, as well as holding the record for the longest running Australian track in the ARIA top 10 ever. Gough and Smillie continued to dominate charts around the country and the world with their singles "In The Air" and "Diamonds in the Sky". Both featured Rudy on vocals and both hit No. 1 on the Australian club chart and were played by all the world's top DJs.

In 2012, Gough collaborated with Feenixpawl on "In My Mind", a track that gained significant international attention. Axwell signed the track to his label and produced a remix of it.

Gough and Andy James (Sgt Slick) have joined forces to create the newest powerhouse duo, L'Tric, and released their first single, "This Feeling". He has also co-produced and mixed many tracks for other artists including the huge hit "Freaks" for Timmy Trumpet, tracks for Nervo, and a host of others.

== Discography ==
=== Singles ===
==== As lead artist ====
Title	Year	Peak chart positions				Album
Title	Year	NL	BEL (Fl.)	BEL (Wal.)	AUS	Album
"In My Mind" (Axwell Mix) (with Feenixpawl featuring Georgi Kay)	2012	37	—	—	29	Until Now
"Kukatu" (with Jebu)	2013	—	—	—	—	Non-album singles
"Home" (featuring Walden and Jebu) (featuring Penelope Austin)	2013	—	—	—	—	Non-album singles
"Noxu" (with Jebu)	2014	—	—	—	—	Non-album singles
"Boom!" (featuring Stevie Mink and Steve Bleas)	2014	—	—	—	—	Non-album singles
"Hear Me" (featuring Feenixpawl and Christine Hoberg)	2014	—	—	—	98	Non-album singles
"Void" (with Jebu)	2015	—	—	—	—	Non-album singles
"Inside Your Arms" (with Kaz James)	2015	—	—	—	—	Non-album singles
"Dreaming" (with Marcus Santoro featuring Lily Papas)	2021	—	—	—	—	Non-album singles
"—" denotes a title that did not chart or was not released.

==== As featured artist ====
Title	Year	Peak Charts Position	
Title	Year	CAN	Album
"Not Taking This No More" (NERVO featuring Ivan Gough and Beverley Knight)	2013	—	Non-album single
"200 Years" (Chloe Wilson featuring Neimy & Ivan Gough)	2020	—	Non-album single
"—" denotes a title that did not chart, or was not released in that territory.

=== Remixes ===
- 2020: Chloe Wilson — "200 Years" (Ivan Gough and Marcus Santoro Remix)
- 2021: Joel Corry and Jax Jones featuring Charli XCX and Saweetie - OUT OUT (Ivan Gough and Jyye Remix)

== Awards and nominations ==
=== APRA Awards ===
The APRA Awards are presented annually from 1982 by the Australasian Performing Right Association (APRA), "honouring composers and songwriters". They commenced in 1982.

Year	Nominee / work	Award	Result	Ref.
2013	"In My Mind" – Feenixpawl & Ivan Gough featuring Georgi Kay (Aden Forte, Ivan Gough, Georgi Kay, Joshua Soon)	Dance Work of the Year	Won	

=== ARIA Music Awards ===
The ARIA Music Awards is an annual awards ceremony that recognises excellence, innovation, and achievement across all genres of Australian music.

Year	Nominee / work	Award	Result
2012	"In My Mind" by Ivan Gough and Feenixpawl featuring Georgi Kay	Best Dance Release	Won
