= In My Mind (Ivan Gough and Feenixpawl song) =

2012 song by Ivan Gough and Feenixpawl featuring Georgi Kay

"In My Mind" is a 2012 song by Australian house music producer Ivan Gough and house music duo Feenixpawl, featuring the vocals of indie pop musician Georgi Kay.

== Axwell Mix ==
"In My Mind (Axwell Mix)"

Single by Ivan Gough and Feenixpawl featuring Georgi Kay

from the album Until Now
- Released: 30 January 2012
- Recorded: 2012
- Genre: EDM; progressive house
- Length: 6:40 (extended); 3:05 (radio edit); 5:06 (Until Now album version)
- Label: Neon; Axtone; Atlantic
- Songwriters: Ivan Gough; Aden Forte (Feenixpawl); Josh Soon (Feenixpawl); Georgi Kay
- Producers: Ivan Gough; Feenixpawl; Axwell (remix)

Ivan Gough singles chronology
"In My Mind (Axwell Mix)" (2012)	"Kukatu" (2013)

Feenixpawl singles chronology
"In My Mind" (2012)

Music video
- "In My Mind (Axwell Remix" on YouTube

The song gained huge popularity when it was remixed by Axwell. The track appeared on Swedish House Mafia 2012 album Until Now when Axwell was part of the Swedish House Mafia that also included Steve Angello and Sebastian Ingrosso.

"In My Mind" peaked at number 29 on the ARIA Singles Chart and at number 51 on the Dutch Single Top 100 chart also appearing in the Tipparade in Belgium. The song spent 11 weeks at number one on the Australian component chart, ARIA Club Tracks. It was released on Neon / Axtone / Atlantic (Warner).

In 2013, it was nominated for a Grammy Award for Best Remixed Recording, Non-Classical.

Axwell also performed the song the 2012 Tomorrowland Festival. It was filmed for the official aftermovie of the festival. He also performed it at the same festival in 2013. With the renewed interest for the song, in 2018 Axwell and Ingrosso performed it as "Dreamer vs in My Mind" in the same festival held annually in Belgium. Steve Angello also played it during the same festival.

=== Charts ===
==== Weekly charts ====
2012–2013 weekly chart performance for "In My Mind"
Chart (2012–2013)	Peak position
Australia (ARIA)	29
Belgium (Ultratip Bubbling Under Flanders)	33
Belgium (Ultratip Bubbling Under Wallonia)	30
CIS Airplay (TopHit)	8
Netherlands (Single Top 100)	51
Russia Airplay (TopHit)	6

==== Monthly charts ====
2012 monthly chart performance for "In My Mind"
Chart (2012)	Peak position
CIS Airplay (TopHit)	48
Russia Airplay (TopHit)	43

2013 monthly chart performance for "In My Mind"
Chart (2013)	Peak position
CIS Airplay (TopHit)	13
Russia Airplay (TopHit)	11

==== Year-end charts ====
2012 year-end chart performance for "In My Mind"
Chart (2012)	Position
CIS Airplay (TopHit)	153
Russia Airplay (TopHit)	129

2013 year-end chart performance for "In My Mind"
Chart (2013)	Position
CIS Airplay (TopHit)	54
Russia Airplay (TopHit)	43

== Flo Rida version ==
"In My Mind, Part 2"

Song by Flo Rida featuring Georgi Kay

from the album Wild Ones
- Released: July 3, 2012
- Length: 4:30
- Label: Poe Boy; Atlantic
- Songwriters: Tramar Dillard; Ivan Gough; Aden Forte; Josh Soon; Georgina Kingsley
- Producers: Ivan Gough; Feenixpawl; Axwell

Following the success of the original, Flo Rida released a revamped and remixed version with additional lyrics featuring samples from Georgi Kay. The release was entitled "In My Mind, Part 2". It appeared on Flo Rida's 2012 album Wild Ones. In addition to Ivan Gough, Aden Forte and Josh Soon (the latter two making the duo Feenixpawl) and Georgina Kingsley (real name of Georgi Kay), credits included Tramar Dillard for the additional lyrics for Flo Rida.

This version also became a minor hit in Australia in its own right, peaking at number 44 on the ARIA Singles Chart staying in the chart for two consecutive weeks.

In 2018, the song was re-worked and released as "In My Mind Part 3".

=== Charts ===
Chart (2012)	Peak position
Australia (ARIA)	44

== Dynoro and Gigi D'Agostino version ==
"In My Mind"

Single by Dynoro and Gigi D'Agostino
- Released: 8 June 2018
- Recorded: 2017
- Genre: Deep house; slap house
- Length: 3:04
- Songwriters: Diego Leoni; Paolo Sandrini; Luigino Di Agostino; Carlos Montagner; Ivan Gough; Aden Forte; Josh Soon; Georgina Kingsley
- Producer: Dynoro

Dynoro singles chronology
"Dreaming" (2017)	"In My Mind" (2018)	"Hangover" (2018)

Gigi D'Agostino singles chronology
"L'Amour Toujours 2012" (2011)	"In My Mind" (2018)	"Hollywood" (2020)

Music video
- "In My Mind" on YouTube

The song was reworked by Lithuanian DJ Dynoro and Italian DJ Gigi D'Agostino. It uses the hook from "L'amour toujours", a 1999 song by D'Agostino. It had been released prior in the same key as the original Axwell version (credited to just Dynoro) in January that year, reaching number 29 on the Austrian Ö3 Austria Top 40 chart.

This version was released on B1 Recordings, a joint venture with Sony Music. In July 2018, the song reached number one on the German and Austrian music charts. It was also a number one hit in the Czech Republic, Finland, Hungary, Norway, Slovakia, Sweden, Switzerland, and a top 5 hit in Belgium and Ireland. It also made number five on the UK singles chart, becoming the first top five hit in Britain for both Dynoro and D'Agostino. The music video (released in March 2019) retitled the song to "In My Mind (In My Head)" and is credited to only Dynoro.

=== Charts ===
==== Weekly charts ====
2017–2019 weekly chart performance for "In My Mind"
Chart (2017–2019)	Peak position
Australia (ARIA)	7
Australia Dance (ARIA)	2
Austria (Ö3 Austria Top 40)	1
Belarus Airplay (Eurofest)	2
Belgium (Ultratop 50 Flanders)	2
Belgium (Ultratop 50 Wallonia)	1
Canada Hot 100 (Billboard)	50
CIS Airplay (TopHit)	1
Croatia International Airplay (Top lista)	10
Czech Republic Airplay (ČNS IFPI)	6
Czech Republic Singles Digital (ČNS IFPI)	1
Denmark (Tracklisten)	3
El Salvador Airplay (Monitor Latino)	12
Estonia (Eesti Tipp-40)	2
Finland (Suomen virallinen lista)	1
France (SNEP)	7
Germany (GfK)	1
Greece International (IFPI)	6
Hungary (Dance Top 40)	1
Hungary (Rádiós Top 40)	1
Hungary (Single Top 40)	1
Hungary (Stream Top 40)	1
Ireland (IRMA)	5
Israel (Media Forest TV Airplay)	10
Italy (FIMI)	11
Latvia Streaming (LaIPA)	3
Lithuania (AGATA)	2
Luxembourg Digital Songs (Billboard)	1
Mexico Airplay (Billboard)	1
Netherlands (Dutch Top 40)	2
Netherlands (Single Top 100)	3
New Zealand (Recorded Music NZ)	15
Norway (VG-lista)	1
Paraguay Anglo Airplay (Monitor Latino)	5
Poland Airplay (ZPAV)	1
Poland Dance (ZPAV)	12
Portugal (AFP)	11
Puerto Rico Anglo Airplay (Monitor Latino)	6
Romania (Airplay 100)	17
Romania Airplay (Media Forest)	1
Russia Airplay (TopHit)	1
Scottish Singles Sales (Official Charts)	3
Slovakia Airplay (ČNS IFPI)	1
Slovakia Singles Digital (ČNS IFPI)	1
Slovenia Airplay (SloTop50)	1
Spain (Promusicae)	45
Sweden (Sverigetopplistan)	1
Switzerland (Schweizer Hitparade)	1
Ukraine Airplay (TopHit)	1
UK Singles (Official Charts)	5
UK Dance (Official Charts)	3
US Dance Club Songs (Billboard)	53
US Hot Dance/Electronic Songs (Billboard)	13
US Dance Airplay (Billboard)	10

2020 weekly chart performance for "In My Mind"
Chart (2020)	Peak position
CIS Airplay (TopHit)	88
Czech Republic Airplay (ČNS IFPI)	40
Czech Republic Singles Digital (ČNS IFPI)	79
Lithuania (AGATA)	70
Russia Airplay (TopHit)	130
Slovakia Airplay (ČNS IFPI)	32
Ukraine Airplay (TopHit)	28

2021 weekly chart performance for "In My Mind"
Chart (2021)	Peak position
CIS Airplay (TopHit)	127
Slovakia Airplay (ČNS IFPI)	59
Ukraine Airplay (TopHit)	93

2022 weekly chart performance for "In My Mind"
Chart (2022)	Peak position
CIS Airplay (TopHit)	191
Ukraine Airplay (TopHit)	112

2023 weekly chart performance for "In My Mind"
Chart (2023)	Peak position
Belarus Airplay (TopHit)	136
Kazakhstan Airplay (TopHit)	192
Lithuania Airplay (TopHit)	81
Moldova Airplay (TopHit)	82
Romania Airplay (TopHit)	91
Ukraine Airplay (TopHit)	159

2024 weekly chart performance for "In My Mind"
Chart (2024)	Peak position
Belarus Airplay (TopHit)	185
Estonia Airplay (TopHit)	107
Lithuania Airplay (TopHit)	78
Romania Airplay (TopHit)	138
Ukraine Airplay (TopHit)	165

2025 weekly chart performance for "In My Mind"
Chart (2025)	Peak position
Belarus Airplay (TopHit)	180
Lithuania Airplay (TopHit)	177
Moldova Airplay (TopHit)	34
Ukraine Airplay (TopHit)	155

2026 weekly chart performance for "In My Mind"
Chart (2026)	Peak position
Belarus Airplay (TopHit)	175
CIS Airplay (TopHit)	175
Kazakhstan Airplay (TopHit)	81
Moldova Airplay (TopHit)	101
Ukraine Airplay (TopHit)	128

==== Monthly charts ====
2018 monthly chart performance for "In My Mind"
Chart (2018)	Peak position
CIS Airplay (TopHit)	1
Czech Republic (Rádio Top 100)	7
Czech Republic (Singles Digitál Top 100)	1
Russia Airplay (TopHit)	1
Slovakia (Rádio Top 100)	1
Slovakia (Singles Digitál Top 100)	1
Ukraine Airplay (TopHit)	2

2019 monthly chart performance for "In My Mind"
Chart (2019)	Peak position
CIS Airplay (TopHit)	8
Czech Republic (Rádio Top 100)	7
Czech Republic (Singles Digitál Top 100)	5
Russia Airplay (TopHit)	21
Slovakia (Rádio Top 100)	2
Slovakia (Singles Digitál Top 100)	14
Ukraine Airplay (TopHit)	1

2020 monthly chart performance for "In My Mind"
Chart (2020)	Peak position
CIS Airplay (TopHit)	99
Czech Republic (Rádio Top 100)	44
Czech Republic (Singles Digitál Top 100)	85
Slovakia (Rádio Top 100)	48
Ukraine Airplay (TopHit)	38

2021 monthly chart performance for "In My Mind"
Chart (2021)	Peak position
Slovakia (Rádio Top 100)	71

2024 monthly chart performance for "In My Mind"
Chart (2024)	Peak position
Lithuania Airplay (TopHit)	100

2025 monthly chart performance for "In My Mind"
Chart (2025)	Peak position
Moldova Airplay (TopHit)	94

2026 monthly chart performance for "In My Mind"
Chart (2026)	Peak position
Kazakhstan Airplay (TopHit)	93

==== Year-end charts ====
2018 year-end chart performance for "In My Mind"
Chart (2018)	Position
Australia (ARIA)	93
Austria (Ö3 Austria Top 40)	1
Belgium (Ultratop Flanders)	13
Belgium (Ultratop Wallonia)	7
CIS Airplay (TopHit)	2
Denmark (Tracklisten)	24
France (SNEP)	56
Estonia (Eesti Tipp-40)	6
Germany (Official German Charts)	1
Hungary (Dance Top 40)	34
Hungary (Rádiós Top 40)	34
Hungary (Single Top 40)	5
Hungary (Stream Top 40)	7
Iceland (Plötutíóindi)	17
Ireland (IRMA)	40
Italy (FIMI)	75
Netherlands (Dutch Top 40)	13
Netherlands (Single Top 100)	20
Poland Airplay (ZPAV)	11
Portugal (AFP)	74
Romania Airplay (Media Forest)	96
Russia Airplay (TopHit)	2
Slovenia Airplay (SloTop50)	43
Sweden (Sverigetopplistan)	11
Switzerland (Schweizer Hitparade)	4
Ukraine Airplay (TopHit)	52
UK Singles (Official Charts Company)	86
US Hot Dance/Electronic Songs (Billboard)	34

2019 year-end chart performance for "In My Mind"
Chart (2019)	Position
Australia (ARIA)	99
Austria (Ö3 Austria Top 40)	29
Belgium (Ultratop Flanders)	62
Belgium (Ultratop Wallonia)	77
CIS Airplay (TopHit)	21
Denmark (Tracklisten)	90
France (SNEP)	91
Germany (Official German Charts)	19
Hungary (Dance Top 40)	2
Hungary (Rádiós Top 40)	2
Hungary (Single Top 40)	13
Hungary (Stream Top 40)	14
Iceland (Tónlistinn)	32
Latvia Streaming (LaIPA)	33
Poland Airplay (ZPAV)	70
Portugal (AFP)	119
Romania Airplay (Media Forest)	89
Russia Airplay (TopHit)	49
Slovenia Airplay (SloTop50)	17
Sweden (Sverigetopplistan)	98
Switzerland (Schweizer Hitparade)	17
Ukraine Airplay (TopHit)	2
US Hot Dance/Electronic Songs (Billboard)	57

2020 year-end chart performance for "In My Mind"
Chart (2020)	Position
CIS Airplay (TopHit)	126
Hungary (Dance Top 40)	10
Hungary (Rádiós Top 40)	38
Ukraine Airplay (TopHit)	48

2021 year-end chart performance for "In My Mind"
Chart (2021)	Position
CIS Airplay (TopHit)	171
Hungary (Dance Top 40)	59
Ukraine Airplay (TopHit)	173

2023 year-end chart performance for "In My Mind"
Chart (2023)	Position
Lithuania Airplay (TopHit)	151

=== Decade-end charts ===
10s Decade-end chart performance for "In My Mind"
Chart (2010–2019)	Position
CIS Airplay (TopHit)	8
Germany (Official German Charts)	20
Russia Airplay (TopHit)	24
Ukraine Airplay (TopHit)	16

20s Decade-end chart performance for "In My Mind"
Chart (2020–2024)	Position
CIS Airplay (TopHit)	182
Lithuania Airplay (TopHit)	150
Moldova Airplay (TopHit)	181
Ukraine Airplay (TopHit)	105

=== Certifications ===
Region	Certification	Certified units/sales
Australia (ARIA)	2× Platinum	140,000^{‡}
Austria (IFPI Austria)	2× Platinum	60,000^{‡}
Belgium (BRMA)	2× Platinum	80,000^{‡}
Canada (Music Canada)	6× Platinum	480,000^{‡}
Denmark (IFPI Danmark)	3× Platinum	270,000^{‡}
France (SNEP)	Diamond	333,333^{‡}
Germany (BVMI)	7× Gold	1,400,000^{‡}
Italy (FIMI)	2× Platinum	100,000^{‡}
Mexico (AMPROFON)	Diamond+Platinum	360,000^{‡}
Netherlands (NVPI)	Platinum	80,000^{‡}
New Zealand (RMNZ)	4× Platinum	120,000^{‡}
Poland (ZPAV)	Diamond	100,000^{‡}
Portugal (AFP)	Platinum	10,000^{‡}
Spain (Promusicae)	2× Platinum	120,000^{‡}
Switzerland (IFPI Switzerland)	2× Platinum	40,000^{‡}
United Kingdom (BPI)	2× Platinum	1,200,000^{‡}
United States (RIAA)	2× Platinum	2,000,000^{‡}
Streaming
Sweden (GLF)	4× Platinum	32,000,000^{†}
^{‡} Sales+streaming figures based on certification alone.^{†} Streaming-only figures based on certification alone.

== See also ==
- List of number-one hits of 2018 (Austria)
- List of Ultratop 50 number-one singles of 2018
- List of number-one singles of 2018 (Finland)
- List of number-one hits of 2018 (Germany)
- List of number-one singles of 2018 (Poland)
- List of number-one hits of 2018 (Switzerland)
- List of UK top-ten singles in 2018
