= Dynoro =

Lithuanian DJ and music producer

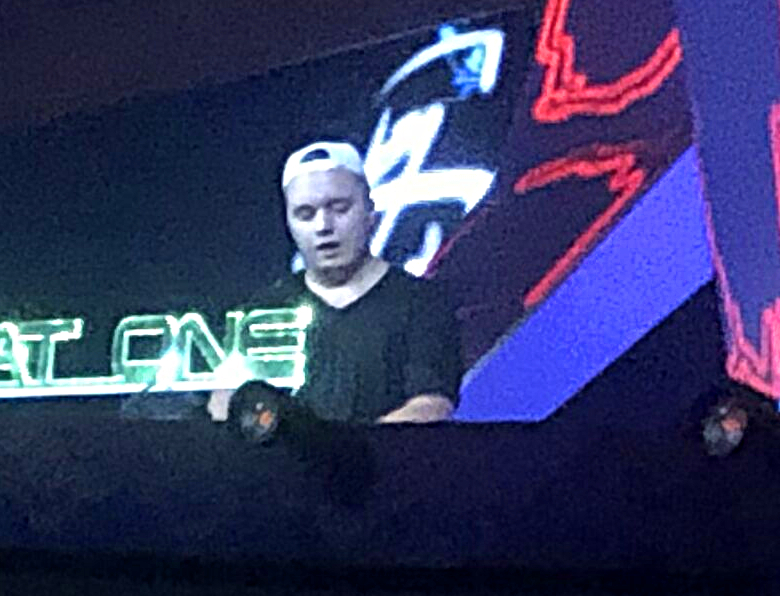
- Dynoro playing live on terminal stage at Airbeat One Festival 2019

Background information
- Born: Edvinas Pechovskis; 25 December 1999 (age 26); Vilnius, Lithuania
- Genres: Electronic; Brazilian bass; Lithuania bass
- Occupations: DJ; music producer
- Years active: 2013–present
- Labels: B1; Arista (Sony); Lithuania HQ; The Artist Union (earlier, discounted in 2020); Echo Music Records (earlier, discounted in 2019)
- Website: Dynoro on Facebook

Edvinas Pechovskis (born 25 December 1999), known professionally as Dynoro, is a Lithuanian DJ and music producer. He is best known for his international hit "In My Mind", which interpolates the hook from "L'amour toujours" by Italian DJ Gigi D'Agostino. In 2019, his remix of the "Rockstar" song with Ilkay Senkan gained wide popularity.

Dynoro started releasing tracks and remixes on SoundCloud and Spotify in 2013, gaining fame in Lithuania thanks to the YouTube channel and record label "Lithuania HQ". In December 2017, his song "In My Mind" was released. It was a mashup of the 2012 song of the same name by Ivan Gough, Feenixpawl and Georgi Kay and Gigi D'Agostino's single "L'amour toujours" from 2000. The song got a lot of attention all over Europe. Due to copyright reasons, the single was taken down from the stores and was re-released in June 2018 with Gigi D'Agostino added as featuring artist. The new version was released on B1 Recordings, a joint venture with Sony Music. In July 2018, the song reached number one in the German music charts. It was also a number 1 hit in the Czech Republic, Finland, Hungary, Slovakia, Sweden, Switzerland, Latvia, Norway and a top 5 hit in Belgium, Ireland, the Netherlands, the UK, Romania, Poland and Ukraine.

== Discography ==
=== Charting singles ===
Single	Year	Peak chart positions											Certifications (sales thresholds)	Album
Single	Year	AUT	BEL	DEN	FRA	GER	IRE	ITA	NLD	NOR	SWI	UK	Certifications (sales thresholds)	Album
"In My Mind"	2018	29	—	—	—	—	—	—	—	—	—	—		Non-album singles
"In My Mind" (with Gigi D'Agostino)	2018	1	2	4	7	1	5	11	3	1	1	5	BEA: 2× Platinum; BPI: 2× Platinum; BVMI: 7× Gold; FIMI: 2× Platinum; IFPI AUT: 2× Platinum; IFPI DEN: 2× Platinum; IFPI SWI: 2× Platinum; NVPI: Platinum; SNEP: Diamond	Non-album singles
"Obsessed" (with Ina Wroldsen)	2019	—	— (Note: "Obsessed" didn't enter the Ultratop Flemish Chart, but peaked at No. 26 on the Ultratip Walloon Chart.)	—	—	—	—	—	—	13	—	—		Non-album singles
"—" denotes releases that did not chart.

=== Other releases ===
- 2017: "Love Me"
- 2017: "Dreaming"
- 2017: "Tau Taip Atrodo" (with 8 Kambarys)
- 2018: "In My Mind" (with Gigi d'Agostino)
- 2018: "Hangover"
- 2019: "Rockstar" (with Ilkay Sencan)
- 2019: "Obsessed " (with Ina Wroldsen)
- 2019: "On & On" (with Alok)
- 2020: "Zver"
- 2020: "Me Provocas" (with Fumaratto)
- 2020: "Elektro" (with Outwork featuring Mr. Gee)
- 2021: "Monsters" (featuring 24kGoldn)
- 2021: "Swimming In Your Eyes"
- 2022: "Wildfire"
- 2022: "Why Why Why" (with HVME and Gaudini)
- 2022: "Heavy Metal Love" (with Twocolors and Unknown Brain)
- 2022: "Live And Die" (feat. Sophie Simmons)
- 2023: "Lay Low" (with Tiësto)
- 2023: "10:45" (with Tate McRae)
- 2023: "Thousand Lullabies"
- 2023: "Deja Vu" (with TRFN and ZHIKO)
- 2024: "Layla" (with Arash)
- 2025: "Abracadabra" (with Lady Gaga)
- 2025: "Calling" (with Mike Demero featuring Sam Feldt)
- 2025: "Funky Beat" (with Alex Gaudino)
- 2026: "Everybody" (with KORDHELL and Imanbek)

=== Remixes ===
- 2014: Mirami feat. Danzel – "Upside Down"
- 2017: Dwin – "Bye Bye Boy"
- 2017: 8 Kambarys featuring Sil – "Einu Iš Proto"
- 2017: Jovani – "Miami Dream"
- 2017: Антоха MC and BMB – "Это лето"
