= Feenixpawl =

Australian DJ duo

- Origin: Melbourne, Victoria, Australia
- Genres: Electro house, progressive house
- Years active: 2003–present
- Labels: Eclypse; Armada; KJM; OneLove; Neon; Axtone; Big Mama's House; Central Station
- Members: Aden Forté; Josh Soon
- Website: feenixpawl.com

Feenixpawl is an Australian house music duo composed of Aden Forté and Josh Soon, formed in 2003. Their fifth single, "In My Mind", peaked at No. 29 on the ARIA Singles Chart, it also spent 11 weeks at No. 1 on the component chart, ARIA Club Tracks, and in 2013 was nominated for a Grammy Award for Best Remixed Recording, Non-Classical. In April 2015, Feenixpawl launched Eclypse Records in conjunction with Wind-Up Records. The first release from the label, Feenixpawl's "Ghosts" (featuring Melissa Ramsay), reached number 16 on the Billboard Dance Charts. In 2019, their Trance collaboration with MaRLo, "Lighter than Air", the duo's first endeavour in the trance genre, won the ASOT Tune of the Year.

== Biography ==
Aden Forté and Josh Soon are two DJs and record producers; they began collaborating in 2003 as Feenixpawl in Melbourne. In 2005 they provided a bootleg remix of All Saints' track, "Pure Shores" and were discovered by music identity Joel Alpha in 2006 which was the main reason for their global success.

In 2006, they began a DJ residency with a touring brand and club night, Onelove, with which they travelled across Australia. In 2008 the duo signed their first record deal with Sony BMG/Onelove Music Group, providing remixes for Kaz James and Citylife, and for DD (ex-Disco Montego).

On 22 August 2009, Feenixpawl released their first single, "Calypso", which was remixed by Kid Massive, Sebastian Morxx and The Sargents. The Kid Massive version peaked at No. 37 on the ARIA Club Tracks. Feenixpawl also remixed other artists: Former Child Stars, Carl Kennedy, Jason Herd, Ben Macklin and Goldfish.

In February 2010, they remixed "Roots" by Ali Payami for Kid Massive's Audio Damage label. In June that year they released their remix for The Nervo Twins entitled "This Kind of Love" for Onelove Records. In November 2010 they provided a remix for a track by Danny Freakazoid and Matt Caseli, "Sign Your Name", which borrowed heavily from Terence Trent D'Arby's 1988 hit of the same name. The remix version was released through Axtone and Neon Records.

On 26 March 2011, Feenixpawl issued their second single, "Seasons", which was remixed by Syke N Sugastarr, Ben Morris and Venuto, Bobby Vena and Nick Galea. "Seasons" spent 14 weeks in the ARIA Club Charts Top 50 and peaked at No. 7.

In April 2011, they released their EP, Clockwerk / Xylophone, with Neon Records. By mid-2011 the duo produced a bootleg of the Adele track, "Rolling in the Deep" which gained international recognition.

In January 2012, Feenixpawl's fifth single, "In My Mind", was released on Axtone Records. It is a collaboration with producer, Ivan Gough, from dance music duo, TV Rock, and featured the singer, Georgi Kay. "In My Mind" peaked at No. 29 on the ARIA Singles Chart, it spent 11 weeks at No. 1 on the ARIA Club Tracks, and also reached No. 1 on the iTunes Dance Charts. On the Dutch Singles Chart it peaked at No. 51.

At the ARIA Music Awards of 2012, in December 2012, the duo, Ivan Gough and Georgi Kay, won the ARIA award for Best Dance Release for "In My Mind". At the APRA Music Awards of 2013, Forté and Soon won Dance Work of the Year for that track, which was shared with fellow songwriters, Gough and Kay.

In April 2015, the duo helped launch the EDM imprint of Wind-Up Records, Eclypse Records. The label's first release, Feenixpawl's "Ghosts" (featuring Melissa Ramsay), reached number 16 on the Billboard Dance Charts. Since then Feenixpawl has released the originals "Blue Sky" (with Jason Forté featuring Mary Jane Smith) and "Everything I Needed" (with Strange Talk).

== Discography ==
=== Extended plays ===
- 2011 Clockwerk / Xylophone [Neon Records]

=== Singles ===
Title	Year	Label	Peak Charts Position						Album
Title	Year	Label	NL	BEL (Fl.)	BEL (Wal.)	AUS	AUS Club	US	Album
"Calypso"	2009	Onelove	—	—	—	—	37	—	Non-album singles
"Seasons"	2009	Onelove	—	—	—	—	7	—	Non-album singles
"In My Mind (Axwell Mix)" (with Ivan Gough featuring Georgi Kay)	2012	Axtone Records	37	—	—	29	1	10	Until Now
"Universe" (featuring Quilla)	2013	Neon	—	—	—	—	18	—	Non-album singles
"Together" (with Jason Forté)	2013	Big Beat / Neon	—	—	—	—	—	—	Non-album singles
"I Won't Break" (with Trevor Simpson)	2013	Neon	—	—	—	—	—	—	Non-album singles
"Hear Me" (with Ivan Gough featuring Christine Hoberg)	2013	Neon	—	—	—	98	19	—	Non-album singles
"Destination" (with DubVision)	2014	Axtone Records	—	—	—	—	—	—	Non-album singles
"Fuse" (with Disfunktion)	2014	Armada Music	—	—	—	—	—	—	Non-album singles
"Home" (with BYNON and Project 46)	2015	Ultra	—	—	—	—	—	—	Non-album singles
"Ghosts" (featuring Melissa Ramsay)	2015	Eclypse	—	—	—	—	—	16	Non-album singles
"Blue Sky" (with Jason Forté featuring Mary Jane Smith)	2015	Eclypse	—	—	—	—	—	17	Non-album singles
"Chapters (Feenixpawl Mix)" (by Decolt)	2016	Eclypse	—	—	—	—	—	—	Non-album singles
"Everything I Needed" (with Strange Talk)	2016	Eclypse	—	—	—	—	—	—	Non-album singles
"Quicksand" (with APEK)	2016	Armada	—	—	—	—	—	—	Non-album singles
"Sinners"	2017	Armada	—	—	—	—	—	—	Non-album singles
"Love Me For Life"	2017	Eclypse	—	—	—	—	—	—	Non-album singles
"Shakin" (with XMulty)	2017	Eclypse	—	—	—	—	—	—	Non-album singles
"Bones" (with Harley Knox, Ariana and the Rose)	2018	Eclypse	—	—	—	—	—	—	Non-album singles
"Fever" (with Watson)	2018	Eclypse	—	—	—	—	—	—	Non-album singles
"Dancin'" (featuring Daniel Etiene)	2018	Eclypse	—	—	—	—	—	—	Non-album singles
"Neon Sky" (featuring Mikayla)	2018	Eclypse	—	—	—	—	—	—	Non-album singles
"Contra" (with Eugene Luu and Hadron)	2018	Eclypse	—	—	—	—	—	—	Non-album singles
"Find a Way" (with Dave Winnel (producer))	2018	Armada	—	—	—	—	—	—	Non-album singles
"Atomic" (with XMulty)	2018	Armada	—	—	—	—	—	—	Non-album singles
"Dreams" (with Sheco featuring Georgi Kay)	2018	Armada	—	—	—	—	—	—	Non-album singles
"Blaze" (with Arensky)	2019	Armada	—	—	—	—	—	—	Non-album singles
"Lighter Than Air" (with Marlo)	2019	Armada	—	—	—	—	—	—	Non-album singles
"Play With Fire" (with Rico & Miella)	2019	Armada	—	—	—	—	—	—	Non-album singles
"Forever Young" (with Marcus Santoro)	2019	Armada	—	—	—	—	—	—	Non-album singles
"Colors"	2020	—	—	—	—	—	—		Non-album singles
"—" denotes items which were not released in that country, failed to chart, or chart information is unknown.

=== Remixes ===
- 2008 Kaz James - "We Hold On" [KJM]
- 2008 Citylife featuring DD - "San Francisco" [Onelove]
- 2009 Former Child Stars - "Safe in Silence" [Independent]
- 2009 Herd and Macklin - "Greenlight" [Onelove]
- 2009 Carl Kennedy - "Elephant & Castle" [Onelove]
- 2009 Felix Baumgartner, Juan Kidd - "Now You're Gone" [Onelove]
- 2009 Angger Dimas - "Duck Army" [Vicious]
- 2009 Sebastian Morxx, Lethal Obsession - "Funky Analog" [Big Mama's House Records]
- 2009 Goldfish - "This Is How It Goes" [Central Station Records]
- 2009 Goldfish - "Fort Knox" [Central Station Records]
- 2009 The Sargents - "Amphibian" [Alicia Music]
- 2009 Carl Kennedy - "RocknRolla" [Onelove]
- 2010 Chris Kaye - "Don't Give Up" [Central Station Records]
- 2010 Ali Payami - "Roots" [Audiodamage Records]
- 2010 NERVO - "This Kind of Love" [Onelove]
- 2010 Venuto - "Love" [Onelove]
- 2010 Beats and Styles - "Friend" [Onelove]
- 2010 Ben Morris and Venuto - "Give It Up" [Onelove]
- 2010 Matt Caseli and Danny Freakazoid - "Sign Your Name" [Neon Records]
- 2011 Bobby Vena and JRJ - "Til There Was You" [Neon Records]
- 2011 Ben Morris, Venuto and Timmy Trumpet - "Endriago" [Neon Records]
- 2011 Silver Sneakerz - "Make You Move" [Hussle Recordings]
- 2011 Fabian Gray - "When U Fall" [Neon Records]
- 2011 Midnite Sleeze - "Lose Control" [Housesession Records]
- 2011 Dion Mavath - "Salvador" [S2G Productions]
- 2011 Q45 and Frankie Charles - "You Know" [3am Jam]
- 2012 Kaskade featuring Skylar Grey - "Room For Happiness" [Ultra]
- 2012 Jono Fernandez featuring Twin Atoms - "Lights Are Fading" [Onelove]
- 2012 Adrian Lux featuring Dante - "Burning" [Ultra]
- 2012 Grant Smillie and Walden featuring Zoe Badwi - "A Million Lights" [Neon Records]
- 2013 John Dahlback featuring Agnes - "Life (Diamonds In The Dark)" [Big Beat Records]
- 2013 Strange Talk - "Falling In Love" [Sony]
- 2013 Jetski Safari - "Like A Lie" [Central Station]
- 2013 Marco V featuring Maruja Retana - "Waiting For The End" [In Charge (Be Yourself]
- 2014 Jacqui Lee - "Broken Ones" [Atlantic Records]
- 2015 Jess Glynne - "Hold My Hand" [Atlantic Records]
- 2016 Nervo featuring Nicky Romero - "Let It Go" [Ultra]
- 2016 Rihanna - "Kiss It Better" [Free]
- 2018 Peking Duk - "Fire" [Sony Music]
- 2019 Midnight Kids featuring Klei - "Find Our Way" [RCA Records]
- 2024 Roxette - "Fading Like a Flower"

== Notes ==
1. ARIA Club Tracks charting for:
  - "Calypso"
  - "Seasons"
  - "In My Mind"
  - "Universe"
  - "Hear Me"

== Awards and nominations ==
=== APRA Awards ===
The APRA Awards are presented annually from 1982 by the Australasian Performing Right Association (APRA), "honouring composers and songwriters". They commenced in 1982.

Year	Nominee / work	Award	Result	Ref.
2013	"In My Mind" – Feenixpawl & Ivan Gough featuring Georgi Kay (Aden Forte, Ivan Gough, Georgi Kay, Joshua Soon)	Dance Work of the Year	Won	

=== ARIA Music Awards ===
The ARIA Music Awards is an annual awards ceremony that recognises excellence, innovation, and achievement across all genres of Australian music.

Year	Nominee / work	Award	Result
2012	"In My Mind" by Ivan Gough and Feenixpawl featuring Georgi Kay	Best Dance Release	Won
