= Vita ce n'è =

Studio album by Eros Ramazzotti
- Released: 23 November 2018
- Genre: Pop rock
- Length: 53:53
- Language: Italian; Spanish
- Label: Polydor
- Producer: Eros Ramazzotti

Eros Ramazzotti chronology
Perfetto (2015)	Vita ce n'è (2018)	Battito Infinito (2022)

Singles from Vita ce n'è
- 1. "Vita ce n'è" Released: 19 October 2018

Vita ce n'è (English: "There's Life") is the fourteenth studio album by Eros Ramazzotti, released on 23 November 2018 through Polydor Records. It was also released in a Spanish version titled Hay vida. It is supported by the lead single and title track, released on 19 October with a music video directed by Marc Klasfeld and filmed in Miami. The album features collaborations with Alessia Cara and Luis Fonsi. Ramazzotti will tour in support of the album, beginning on 17 February 2019 in Munich. The tour will visit five continents.

== Background ==
Ramazzotti revealed that the album's title "represents the mood of this historical moment [of being 55], it's a positive message".

== Promotion ==
A preview of the video for the title track was shown on TG1 on 17 October before being released in full on 19 October.

== Track listing ==
Adapted from Ramazzotti's Twitter.

No.	Title	Length
1.	"Per il resto tutto bene"	3:25
2.	"Vita ce n'è"	3:11
3.	"Vale per sempre" (featuring Alessia Cara)	3:25
4.	"Siamo"	3:38
5.	"In primo piano"	3:41
6.	"Ti dichiaro amore"	3:36
7.	"Per le strade una canzone" (featuring Luis Fonsi)	3:30
8.	"Una vita nuova"	3:32
9.	"Ho bisogno di te"	3:22
10.	"Due volontà"	3:33
11.	"Nati per amare"	4:17
12.	"Dall'altra parte dell'infinto"	3:59
13.	"Buonamore"	3:43
14.	"Avanti così"	3:27
15.	"Per il resto tutto bene" (featuring Helene Fischer)	3:26

== Charts ==
=== Weekly charts ===
Chart (2018)	Peak position
Austrian Albums (Ö3 Austria)	1
Belgian Albums (Ultratop Flanders)	12
Belgian Albums (Ultratop Wallonia)	6
Czech Albums (ČNS IFPI)	21
Dutch Albums (Album Top 100)	22
French Albums (SNEP)	45
German Albums (Offizielle Top 100)	7
Hungarian Albums (MAHASZ)	22
Italian Albums (FIMI)	1
Spanish Albums (PROMUSICAE)	6
Swiss Albums (Schweizer Hitparade)	1

=== Year-end charts ===
Chart (2018)	Position
Belgian Albums (Ultratop Wallonia)	66
Swiss Albums (Schweizer Hitparade)	42

Chart (2019)	Position
Belgian Albums (Ultratop Wallonia)	140
Italian Albums (FIMI)	62
Swiss Albums (Schweizer Hitparade)	35

== Certifications ==
Certifications for Vita ce n'è
Region	Certification	Certified units/sales
Italy (FIMI)	Platinum	50,000^{‡}
^{‡} Sales+streaming figures based on certification alone.

== Vita Ce N'è World Tour ==
2019
Europe
February 14	Mantua	Italy	PalaBam
February 17	Munich	Germany	Olympiahalle
February 18	Munich	Germany	Olympiahalle
February 20	Cologne	Germany	Lanxess Arena
February 22	Esch-sur-Alzette	Luxembourg	Rockhal
February 25	Stuttgart	Germany	Schleyer-Halle
March 2	Turin	Italy	Pala Alpitour
March 5	Milan	Italy	Forum
March 6	Milan	Italy	Forum
March 8	Milan	Italy	Forum
March 9	Milan	Italy	Forum
March 12	Rome	Italy	Palalottomatica
March 13	Rome	Italy	Palalottomatica
March 15	Rome	Italy	Palalottomatica
March 16	Rome	Italy	Palalottomatica
March 19	Lyon	France	Halle Tony Garnier
March 21	Madrid	Spain	Palacio Vistalegre
March 23	Barcelona	Spain	Palau Sant Jordi
March 25	Zürich	Switzerland	Hallenstadion
March 28	Paris	France	Accor Arena
March 31	Brussels	Belgium	Forest National
April 1	Brussels	Belgium	Forest National
April 3	Amsterdam	Netherlands	Ziggo Dome
April 5	London	England	Eventim Apollo
April 7	Marseille	France	Le Dôme
April 9	Genève	Switzerland	Arena de Genève
April 11	Leipzig	Germany	Arena Leipzig
April 13	Mannheim	Germany	SAP Arena
April 15	Vienna	Austria	Stadthalle
July 24	Las Palmas	Spain	Gran Canaria Arena
August 15	Opatija	Croatia	Ljetna Pozornica
September 11	Verona	Italy	Verona Arena
September 12	Verona	Italy	Verona Arena
September 14	Verona	Italy	Verona Arena
September 27	Athens	Greece	Faliro Arena
September 30	Skopje	Macedonia	A1 Arena Sports Center
October 3	Sofia	Bulgaria	Arena Armeec
October 5	Bratislava	Slovakia	Ondrej Nepela Arena
October 10	Moscow	Russia	Crocus City Hall
October 11	Moscow	Russia	Crocus City Hall
October 13	Saint Petersburg	Russia	Ice Palace
October 15	Helsinki	Finland	Hartwall Arena
October 20	Warsaw	Poland	Hala Torwar
October 24	Budapest	Hungary	Budapest Sports Arena
October 27	Copenhagen	Denmark	K.B. Hallen
October 30	Stockholm	Sweden	Ericsson Globe
November 9	Tel Aviv	Israel	Nokia Arena
November 23	Ljubljana	Slovenia	Arena Stožice
December 14	Florence	Italy	Nelson Mandela Forum
December 17	Livorno	Italy	PalaLivorno
2020
South America
January 28	Guatemala City	Guatemala	Explanada Cardales Cayalá
February 2	Bogotá	Colombia	Movistar Arena
February 8	Monterrey	Mexico	Auditorio Citibanamex
February 14	Buenos Aires	Argentina	Estadio Luna Park
February 18	São Paulo	Brazil	Espaço das Américas
North America
February 22	Atlantic City	United States	Hard Rock Live
February 25	New York City	United States	Hulu Theater
February 27	Boston	United States	Wang Theater
March 1	Miami	United States	FTX Arena
March 4	Rosemont	United States	Rosemont Theater
March 7	Toronto	Canada	Scotiabank Arena
March 9	Laval	Canada	Place Bell
