= List of number-one urban albums of 2019 (Australia) =

ARIA Charts number-one urban albums of 2019 < 2018 2020 >

Other Australian number-one charts of 2019
- albums
- singles
- urban singles
- dance singles
- club tracks
- digital tracks
- streaming tracks

Top Australian singles and albums of 2019
- Triple J Hottest 100
- top 25 singles
- top 25 albums

This is a list of albums that reached number-one on the ARIA Urban Albums Chart in 2019. The ARIA Urban Albums Chart is a weekly chart that ranks the best-performing urban albums in Australia. It is published by the Australian Recording Industry Association (ARIA), an organisation that collects music data for the weekly ARIA Charts. To be eligible to appear on the chart, the recording must be an album of a predominantly urban nature.

== Chart history ==
Issue date	Album	Artist(s)	Reference
7 January	Beerbongs & Bentleys	Post Malone	
14 January	Beerbongs & Bentleys	Post Malone	
21 January	Beerbongs & Bentleys	Post Malone	
28 January	Beerbongs & Bentleys	Post Malone	
4 February	Beerbongs & Bentleys	Post Malone	
11 February	Beerbongs & Bentleys	Post Malone	
18 February	Beerbongs & Bentleys	Post Malone	
25 February	Kamikaze	Eminem	
4 March	The Great Expanse	Hilltop Hoods	
11 March	The Great Expanse	Hilltop Hoods	
18 March	Lifestyle	Kerser	
25 March	The Great Expanse	Hilltop Hoods	
1 April	The Great Expanse	Hilltop Hoods	
8 April	The Great Expanse	Hilltop Hoods	
15 April	Free Spirit	Khalid	
22 April	Free Spirit	Khalid	
29 April	Free Spirit	Khalid	
6 May	Free Spirit	Khalid	
13 May	Free Spirit	Khalid	
20 May	Free Spirit	Khalid	
27 May	Igor	Tyler, the Creator	
3 June	Igor	Tyler, the Creator	
10 June	Free Spirit	Khalid	
17 June	Free Spirit	Khalid	
24 June	Free Spirit	Khalid	
1 July	7 EP	Lil Nas X	
8 July	Indigo	Chris Brown	
15 July	Revenge of the Dreamers III	J. Cole	
22 July	Starry Night Over the Phone	Allday	
29 July	Free Spirit	Khalid	
5 August	The Search	NF	
12 August	Care Package	Drake	
19 August	Beerbongs & Bentleys	Post Malone	
26 August	Beerbongs & Bentleys	Post Malone	
2 September	Ginger	Brockhampton	
9 September	Astroworld	Travis Scott	
16 September	Hollywood's Bleeding	Post Malone	
23 September	Hollywood's Bleeding	Post Malone	
30 September	Hollywood's Bleeding	Post Malone	
7 October	Hollywood's Bleeding	Post Malone	
14 October	Hollywood's Bleeding	Post Malone	
21 October	Hollywood's Bleeding	Post Malone	
28 October	Hollywood's Bleeding	Post Malone	
4 November	Jesus Is King	Kanye West	
11 November	Jesus Is King	Kanye West	
18 November	Hollywoods Bleeding	Post Malone	
25 November	Hollywoods Bleeding	Post Malone	
2 December	Hollywoods Bleeding	Post Malone	
9 December	Hollywoods Bleeding	Post Malone	
16 December	Hollywoods Bleeding	Post Malone	
23 December	Heavy Is the Head	Stormzy	
30 December	Hollywood's Bleeding	Post Malone	

== See also ==
- 2019 in music
- List of number-one albums of 2019 (Australia)
