= List of number-one digital albums of 2019 (Australia) =

ARIA Charts number-one digital albums of 2019 < 2018 2020 >

Other Australian number-one charts of 2019
- albums
- singles
- urban singles
- dance singles
- club tracks
- digital tracks
- streaming tracks

Top Australian singles and albums of 2019
- Triple J Hottest 100
- top 25 singles
- top 25 albums

The ARIA Digital Album Chart ranks the best-performing albums and extended plays (EPs) in Australia. Its data, published by the Australian Recording Industry Association, is based collectively on the weekly digital sales of albums and EPs.

== Chart history ==
Date	Album	Artist(s)	Ref.
7 January	The Greatest Showman: Original Motion Picture Soundtrack	Various Artists	
14 January	The Greatest Showman: Original Motion Picture Soundtrack	Various Artists	
21 January	Bohemian Rhapsody: The Original Soundtrack	Queen	
28 January	A Star Is Born	Lady Gaga and Bradley Cooper	
4 February	Amo	Bring Me the Horizon	
11 February	A Star Is Born	Lady Gaga and Bradley Cooper	
18 February	Thank U, Next	Ariana Grande	
25 February	A Star Is Born	Lady Gaga and Bradley Cooper	
4 March	The Great Expanse	Hilltop Hoods	
11 March	The Great Expanse	Hilltop Hoods	
18 March	Lifestyle	Kerser	
25 March	The Great Expanse	Hilltop Hoods	
1 April	A Place We Knew	Dean Lewis	
8 April	When We All Fall Asleep, Where Do We Go?	Billie Eilish	
15 April	When We All Fall Asleep, Where Do We Go?	Billie Eilish	
22 April	Map of the Soul: Persona	BTS	
29 April	When We All Fall Asleep, Where Do We Go?	Billie Eilish	
6 May	Hurts 2B Human	Pink	
13 May	Hurts 2B Human	Pink	
20 May	Backroad Nation	Lee Kernaghan	
27 May	Life	Conrad Sewell	
3 June	Aladdin (2019 soundtrack)	Various Artists	
10 June	My Criminal Record	Jimmy Barnes	
17 June	Happiness Begins	Jonas Brothers	
24 June	Madame X	Madonna	
1 July	Western Stars	Bruce Springsteen	
8 July	Step Back in Time: The Definitive Collection	Kylie Minogue	
15 July	The Very Best	Inxs	
22 July	No.6 Collaborations Project	Ed Sheeran	
29 July	No.6 Collaborations Project	Ed Sheeran	
5 August	No.6 Collaborations Project	Ed Sheeran	
12 August	Run Home Slow	The Teskey Brothers	
19 August	We Are Not Your Kind	Slipknot	
26 August	Atonement	Killswitch Engage	
2 September	Lover	Taylor Swift	
9 September	Fear Inoculum	Tool	
16 September	Hollywood's Bleeding	Post Malone	
23 September	The Nothing	Korn	
30 September	Nine	Blink-182	
7 October	Suck On Light	Boy & Bear	
14 October	Ghosteen	Nick Cave and the Bad Seeds	
21 October	Awake	Hillsong Worship	
28 October	Hilda	Jessica Mauboy	
4 November	Jesus Is King	Kanye West	
11 November	Jesus Is King	Kanye West	
18 November	What You See Is What You Get	Luke Combs	
25 November	Ocean	Lady Antebellum	
2 December	Everyday Life	Coldplay	
9 December	Frozen II	Soundtrack	
16 December	Blood Moon	Cold Chisel	
23 December	Fine Line	Harry Styles	
30 December	Christmas	Michael Bublé	

== Number-one artists ==
Position	Artist	Weeks at No. 1
1	Billie Eilish	3
1	Lady Gaga	3
1	Bradley Cooper	3
1	Ed Sheeran	3
1	Hilltop Hoods	3
2	Pink	2
2	Kanye West	2
3	Ariana Grande	1
3	Blink-182	1
3	Bring Me The Horizon	1
3	Bruce Springsteen	1
3	BTS	1
3	Dean Lewis	1
3	Hillsong Worship	1
3	Jimmy Barnes	1
3	Jonas Brothers	1
3	Kerser	1
3	Killswitch Engage	1
3	Lee Kernaghan	1
3	Madonna	1
3	Nick Cave and the Bad Seeds	1
3	Post Malone	1
3	Queen	1
3	Korn	1
3	Kylie Minogue	1
3	Inxs	1
3	The Teskey Brothers	1
3	Slipknot	1
3	Taylor Swift	1
3	Tool	1
3	Jessica Mauboy	1
3	Lady Antebellum	1
3	Coldplay	1
3	Cold Chisel	1
3	Harry Styles	1
3	Michael Bublé	1

== See also ==
- 2019 in music
- ARIA Charts
- List of number-one albums of 2019 (Australia)
