= List of number-one country albums of 2019 (Australia) =

ARIA Charts number-one country albums of 2019 < 2018 2020 >

Other Australian number-one charts of 2019
- albums
- singles
- urban singles
- dance singles
- club tracks
- digital tracks
- streaming tracks

Top Australian singles and albums of 2019
- Triple J Hottest 100
- top 25 singles
- top 25 albums

These are the Australian Country number-one albums of 2019, per the ARIA Charts.

Issue date	Album	Artist
7 January	This One's for You	Luke Combs
14 January	This One's for You	Luke Combs
21 January	This One's for You	Luke Combs
28 January	Cream of Country 2019	Various artists
4 February	Graffiti U	Keith Urban
11 February	Graffiti U	Keith Urban
18 February	Cream of Country 2019	Various artists
25 February	Can't Say I Ain't Country	Florida Georgia Line
4 March	Can't Say I Ain't Country	Florida Georgia Line
11 March	Good Times – Great Country	Various artists
18 March	Good Times – Great Country	Various artists
25 March	This One's for You	Luke Combs
1 April	This One's for You	Luke Combs
8 April	So Country 2019	Various artists
15 April	Reboot	Brooks & Dunn
22 April	This One's for You	Luke Combs
29 April	This One's for You	Luke Combs
6 May	This One's for You	Luke Combs
13 May	This One's for You	Luke Combs
20 May	Backroad Nation	Lee Kernaghan
27 May	Backroad Nation	Lee Kernaghan
3 June	Backroad Nation	Lee Kernaghan
10 June	Backroad Nation	Lee Kernaghan
17 June	This One's for You	Luke Combs
24 June	Spark	Amber Lawrence
1 July	This One's for You	Luke Combs
8 July	Things That We Drink To	Morgan Evans
15 July	This One's for You	Luke Combs
22 July	This One's for You	Luke Combs
29 July	This One's for You	Luke Combs
5 August	This One's for You	Luke Combs
12 August	This One's for You	Luke Combs
19 August	This One's for You	Luke Combs
26 August	This One's for You	Luke Combs
2 September	This One's for You	Luke Combs
9 September	This One's for You	Luke Combs
16 September	This One's for You	Luke Combs
23 September	This One's for You	Luke Combs
30 September	This One's for You	Luke Combs
7 October	This One's for You	Luke Combs
14 October	This One's for You	Luke Combs
21 October	This One's for You	Luke Combs
28 October	Broken Lines	Christie Lamb
4 November	This One's for You	Luke Combs
11 November	This One's for You	Luke Combs
18 November	What You See Is What You Get	Luke Combs
25 November	What You See Is What You Get	Luke Combs
2 December	What You See Is What You Get	Luke Combs
9 December	What You See Is What You Get	Luke Combs
16 December	What You See Is What You Get	Luke Combs
23 December	What You See Is What You Get	Luke Combs
30 December	What You See Is What You Get	Luke Combs

== See also ==
- 2019 in music
- List of number-one albums of 2019 (Australia)
