= List of top 10 singles for 2019 in Australia =

This is a list of singles that charted in the top ten of the ARIA Charts in 2019. In 2019, twenty-three acts reached the top ten for the first time.

== Top-ten singles ==
Key

Symbol	Meaning
◁	Indicates single's top 10 entry was also its ARIA top 50 debut
(#)	2019 Year-end top 10 single position and rank

List of ARIA top ten singles that peaked in 2019
Top ten entry date	Single	Artist(s)	Peak	Peak date	Weeks in top ten	References
Singles from 2018
13 August	"Sicko Mode" ◁ ^{[A]}^{[B]}	Travis Scott featuring Drake	6	4 February	10	
29 October	"When the Party's Over" ◁ ^{[D]}	Billie Eilish	7	8 April	4	
5 November	"Sunflower" (#4) ^{[H]}	Post Malone and Swae Lee	1	7 January	31	
10 December	"Sweet but Psycho"	Ava Max	2	7 January	16	
Singles from 2019
7 January	"Wow" (#7) ◁	Post Malone	2	18 March	18	
28 January	"7 Rings" (#10) ◁	Ariana Grande	1	28 January	10	
28 January	"Dancing with a Stranger"	Sam Smith and Normani	6	4 March	10	
4 February	"Confidence" ◁	Ocean Alley	9	4 February	1	
11 February	"Bury a Friend" ◁ ^{[D]}	Billie Eilish	3	11 February	8	
18 February	"Break Up with Your Girlfriend, I'm Bored" ◁	Ariana Grande	2	18 February	7	
25 February	"Talk" ^{[E]}^{[G]}	Khalid	4	22 April	12	
11 March	"Sucker" ◁ ^{[I]}	Jonas Brothers	1	18 March	15	
18 March	"3 Nights"	Dominic Fike	3	29 April	14	
1 April	"7 Minutes"	Dean Lewis	10	1 April	1	
8 April	"Bad Guy" (#3) ◁	Billie Eilish	1	8 April	25	
8 April	"Wish You Were Gay"	Billie Eilish	5	8 April	2	
8 April	"All the Good Girls Go to Hell" ◁	Billie Eilish	8	8 April	1	
8 April	"Xanny" ◁	Billie Eilish	10	8 April	1	
15 April	"Old Town Road" (#1)	Lil Nas X featuring Billy Ray Cyrus	1	22 April	27	
15 April	"Here with Me"	Marshmello featuring Chvrches	9	22 April	3	
22 April	"Boy with Luv" ◁	BTS featuring Halsey	10	22 April	1	
29 April	"SOS"	Avicii featuring Aloe Blacc	7	27 May	8	
29 April	"Someone You Loved" (#5) ^{[F]}^{[L]}^{[N]}^{[O]}^{[Q]}	Lewis Capaldi	4	3 June	20	
6 May	"Me!" ◁	Taylor Swift featuring Brendon Urie	2	6 May	3	
13 May	"If I Can't Have You" ◁	Shawn Mendes	4	13 May	7	
13 May	"Homicide" ◁	Logic featuring Eminem	6	13 May	1	
20 May	"I Don't Care" (#6) ◁	Ed Sheeran and Justin Bieber	1	20 May	13	
3 June	"Cross Me" ◁ ^{[J]}	Ed Sheeran featuring Chance the Rapper and PnB Rock	5	10 June	7	
3 June	"Earfquake"	Tyler, the Creator featuring Playboi Carti	9	3 June	1	
10 June	"Never Really Over" ◁	Katy Perry	7	10 June	4	
24 June	"You Need to Calm Down" ◁	Taylor Swift	3	24 June	3	
24 June	"No Guidance"	Chris Brown featuring Drake	7	24 June	1	
1 July	"Señorita" (#8) ◁	Shawn Mendes and Camila Cabello	1	29 July	17	
1 July	"Money in the Grave"	Drake featuring Rick Ross	7	1 July	1	
1 July	"Piece of Your Heart" ^{[K]}^{[M]}	Meduza featuring Goodboys	7	8 July	12	
8 July	"Beautiful People" ◁	Ed Sheeran featuring Khalid	4	8 July	15	
8 July	"Choir"	Guy Sebastian	7	15 July	4	
15 July	"Goodbyes" ◁ ^{[M]}	Post Malone featuring Young Thug	5	15 July	9	
15 July	"Dance Monkey" (#2)	Tones and I	1	5 August	41	
5 August	"The Git Up"	Blanco Brown	5	30 September	11	
12 August	"Boyfriend" ◁	Ariana Grande and Social House	4	12 August	2	
26 August	"Ransom"	Lil Tecca	8	26 August	4	
26 August	"One Thing Right"	Marshmello featuring Kane Brown	4	30 September	10	
2 September	"Lover"	Taylor Swift	3	2 September	4	
9 September	"Circles" ◁	Post Malone	2	16 September	28	
23 September	"Don't Call Me Angel" ◁	Ariana Grande, Miley Cyrus and Lana Del Rey	4	23 September	2	
7 October	"How Do You Sleep?"	Sam Smith	10	7 October	1	
14 October	"Highest in the Room" ◁	Travis Scott	3	14 October	4	
14 October	"10,000 Hours" ◁	Dan + Shay and Justin Bieber	4	14 October	6	
14 October	"Memories"	Maroon 5	2	18 November	16	
21 October	"Ride It"	Regard	3	11 November	14	
21 October	"Lights Up"	Harry Styles	7	21 October	1	
21 October	"Hot Girl Bummer"	Blackbear	8	21 October	4	
28 October	"Never Seen the Rain" ^{[P]}	Tones & I	7	16 December	14	
4 November	"Lose You to Love Me" ◁	Selena Gomez	2	4 November	5	
4 November	"Good as Hell"	Lizzo featuring Ariana Grande	6	4 November	9	
4 November	"Follow God" ◁	Kanye West	7	4 November	1	
11 November	"Don't Start Now" ◁	Dua Lipa	2	16 December	29	
18 November	"Roxanne" ◁	Arizona Zervas	2	2 December	11	
25 November	"Everything I Wanted" ◁	Billie Eilish	2	25 November	6	
9 December	"Heartless" ◁	The Weeknd	10	9 December	1	
23 December	"Adore You"	Harry Styles	7	23 December	7	

=== 2018 peaks ===
List of ARIA top ten singles in 2019 that peaked in 2018
Top ten entry date	Single	Artist(s)	Peak	Peak date	Weeks in top ten	References
6 August	"Eastside" ^{[A]}	Benny Blanco featuring Halsey and Khalid	2	27 August	24	
27 August	"Shotgun"	George Ezra	1	24 September	23	
22 October	"Without Me"	Halsey	2	10 December	20	
29 October	"Shallow" (#9) ^{[B]}	Lady Gaga and Bradley Cooper	1	29 October	22	
12 November	"Thank U, Next" ◁ ^{[C]}	Ariana Grande	1	19 November	13	
17 December	"Nothing Breaks Like a Heart" ^{[A]}	Mark Ronson featuring Miley Cyrus	6	24 December	8	

=== 2020 peaks ===
List of ARIA top ten singles in 2019 that peaked in 2020
Top ten entry date	Single	Artist(s)	Peak	Peak date	Weeks in top ten	References
23 December	"Blinding Lights"	The Weeknd	1	27 January	40	

=== Holiday season ===
Holiday titles first making the ARIA Top 50 top ten during the 2019–20 holiday season
Top ten entry date	Single	Artist(s)	Peak	Peak date	Weeks in top ten	Ref.
30 December 2019	"It's Beginning to Look a Lot Like Christmas"	Michael Buble	3	3 January 2022	8	

Recurring holiday titles, appearing in the ARIA Top 50 top ten in previous holiday seasons
Top ten entry date	Single	Artist(s)	Peak	Peak date	Weeks in top ten	Ref.
1 January 2018	"All I Want for Christmas Is You" ^{[R]}	Mariah Carey	1	31 December 2018	21	
31 December 2018	"Last Christmas" ^{[S]}	Wham!	2	28 December 2020	13	

Notes:

^{A} The singles re-entered the top 10 on 7 January 2019.
^{B} The singles re-entered the top 10 on 4 February 2019.
^{C} The single re-entered the top 10 on 18 February 2019.
^{D} The singles re-entered the top 10 on 8 April 2019.
^{E} The single re-entered the top 10 on 15 April 2019.
^{F} The single re-entered the top 10 on 20 May 2019.
^{G} The single re-entered the top 10 on 27 May 2019.
^{H} The single re-entered the top 10 on 10 June 2019.
^{I} The single re-entered the top 10 on 17 June 2019.
^{J} The single re-entered the top 10 on 22 July 2019.
^{K} The single re-entered the top 10 on 29 July 2019.
^{L} The single re-entered the top 10 on 19 August 2019.
^{M} The singles re-entered the top 10 on 16 September 2019.
^{N} The single re-entered the top 10 on 23 September 2019.
^{O} The single re-entered the top 10 on 28 October 2019.
^{P} The single re-entered the top 10 on 11 November 2019.
^{Q} The single re-entered the top 10 on 16 December 2019.
^{R} The single re-entered the top 10 on 23 December 2019.
^{S} The single re-entered the top 10 on 30 December 2019.

== Entries by artist ==
The following table shows artists who achieved two or more top 10 entries in 2019, including songs that reached their peak in 2018 and 2020. The figures include both main artists and featured artists. The total number of weeks an artist spent in the top ten in 2019 is also shown.

Entries	Artist	Weeks	Songs
7	Billie Eilish	32	"All the Good Girls Go to Hell", "Bad Guy", "Bury a Friend", "Everything I Wanted", "When the Party's Over", "Wish You Were Gay", "Xanny"
6	Ariana Grande	24	"Boyfriend", "Break Up with Your Girlfriend, I'm Bored", "Don't Call Me Angel", "Good As Hell", "Thank U, Next", "7 Rings"
4	Post Malone	48	"Circles", "Goodbyes", "Sunflower", "Wow"
3	Drake	7	"Money in the Grave", "No Guidance", "Sicko Mode"
3	Ed Sheeran	22	"Beautiful People", "Cross Me", "I Don't Care"
3	Halsey	10	"Boy with Luv", "Eastside", "Without Me"
3	Khalid	31	"Beautiful People", "Eastside", "Talk"
3	Taylor Swift	8	"Lover", "Me!", "You Need to Calm Down"
2	Harry Styles	2	"Adore You", "Lights Up"
2	Justin Bieber	19	"I Don't Care", "10,000 Hours"
2	Marshmello	13	"Here with Me", "One Thing Right"
2	Miley Cyrus	8	"Don't Call Me Angel", "Nothing Breaks Like a Heart"
2	Sam Smith	11	"Dancing With A Stranger", "How Do You Sleep?"
2	Shawn Mendes	23	"If I Can't Have You", "Señorita"
2	Tones and I	26	"Dance Monkey", "Never Seen the Rain"
2	Travis Scott	9	"Highest in the Room", "Sicko Mode"
2	The Weeknd	2	"Blinding Lights", "Heartless"

== See also ==
- 2019 in music
- ARIA Charts
- List of number-one singles of 2019 (Australia)
