= List of Top 25 singles for 2019 in Australia =

Top 25 singles of 2019 < 2018 2020 >

Other Australian top charts for 2019
- top 25 albums
- Triple J Hottest 100

Australian number-one charts of 2019
- albums
- singles
- urban singles
- dance singles
- club tracks
- digital tracks
- streaming tracks

The following lists the top 25 singles of 2019 in Australia from the Australian Recording Industry Association (ARIA) end-of-year singles chart.

"Old Town Road" by Lil Nas X featuring Billy Ray Cyrus was the top selling single of 2019 in Australia, spending thirteen weeks at No. 1 and being certified ten times platinum. It was followed by "Dance Monkey" by Tones and I, which became the year's highest-selling Australian song, being certified seven times platinum and spending 21 consecutive weeks atop the chart, breaking the record for the most weeks at number one by an Australian artist, which was previously held by Justice Crew's 2014 song "Que Sera" (9 weeks), and the record for most weeks at number one in Australian chart history, previously held by Ed Sheeran's 2017 song "Shape of You" (15 weeks).

#	Title	Artist	Highest pos. reached
1	"Old Town Road"	Lil Nas X featuring Billy Ray Cyrus	1
2	"Dance Monkey"	Tones and I	1
3	"Bad Guy"	Billie Eilish	1
4	"Sunflower"	Post Malone and Swae Lee	1
5	"Someone You Loved"	Lewis Capaldi	4
6	"I Don't Care"	Ed Sheeran and Justin Bieber	1
7	"Wow"	Post Malone	2
8	"Señorita"	Shawn Mendes and Camila Cabello	1
9	"Shallow"	Lady Gaga and Bradley Cooper	1
10	"7 Rings"	Ariana Grande	1
11	"3 Nights"	Dominic Fike	3
12	"Eastside"	Benny Blanco, Halsey and Khalid	2
13	"Sucker"	Jonas Brothers	1
14	"Beautiful People"	Ed Sheeran featuring Khalid	4
15	"Sweet but Psycho"	Ava Max	2
16	"Piece of Your Heart"	Meduza featuring Goodboys	7
17	"Talk"	Khalid	4
18	"Without Me"	Halsey	2
19	"Dancing with a Stranger"	Sam Smith and Normani	6
20	"Circles"	Post Malone	2
21	"Happier"	Marshmello and Bastille	3
22	"Shotgun"	George Ezra	1
23	"One Thing Right"	Marshmello featuring Kane Brown	4
24	"The Git Up"	Blanco Brown	5
25	"Sicko Mode"	Travis Scott featuring Drake	6

== See also ==
- List of number-one singles of 2019 (Australia)
- List of top 10 singles in 2019 (Australia)
- List of Top 25 albums for 2019 in Australia
- 2019 in music
- ARIA Charts
- List of Australian chart achievements and milestones
