= List of number-one country albums of 2018 (Australia) =

ARIA Charts number-one country albums of 2018 < 2017 2019 >

Other Australian number-one charts of 2018
- albums
- singles
- urban singles
- dance singles
- club tracks
- digital tracks
- streaming tracks

Top Australian singles and albums of 2018
- Triple J Hottest 100
- top 25 singles
- top 25 albums

These are the Australian Country number-one albums of 2018, per the ARIA Charts.

Issue date	Album	Artist
1 January	What Makes You Country	Luke Bryan
8 January	What Makes You Country	Luke Bryan
15 January	What Makes You Country	Luke Bryan
22 January	Cream of Country 2018	Various artists
29 January	Cream of Country 2018	Various artists
5 February	Cream of Country 2018	Various artists
12 February	Cream of Country 2018	Various artists
19 February	Adam & Brooke	Adam Eckersley and Brooke McClymont
26 February	Cream of Country 2018	Various artists
5 March	Cream of Country 2018	Various artists
12 March	Cream of Country 2018	Various artists
19 March	What Makes You Country	Luke Bryan
26 March	So Country 2018	Various artists
2 April	So Country 2018	Various artists
9 April	So Country 2018	Various artists
16 April	So Country 2018	Various artists
23 April	So Country 2018	Various artists
30 April	So Country 2018	Various artists
7 May	Graffiti U	Keith Urban
14 May	Graffiti U	Keith Urban
21 May	Graffiti U	Keith Urban
28 May	Graffiti U	Keith Urban
4 June	Graffiti U	Keith Urban
11 June	This One's for You	Luke Combs
18 June	Graffiti U	Keith Urban
25 June	So Country 2018	Various artists
2 July	Dan + Shay	Dan + Shay
9 July	So Country 2018	Various artists
16 July	So Country 2018	Various artists
23 July	Milestones... 20 Years	Adam Brand
30 July	Milestones... 20 Years	Adam Brand
6 August	The Nashville Tapes	Adam Harvey
13 August	Graffiti U	Keith Urban
20 August	Graffiti U	Keith Urban
27 August	Brave & the Broken	Travis Collins
3 September	Butcherbird	John Williamson
10 September	Butcherbird	John Williamson
17 September	So Country 2018	Various artists
24 September	Cry Pretty	Carrie Underwood
1 October	Cry Pretty	Carrie Underwood
8 October	Cry Pretty	Carrie Underwood
15 October	This One's for You	Luke Combs
22 October	Things That We Drink To	Morgan Evans
29 October	Greatest Hits	Troy Cassar-Daley
5 November	Things That We Drink To	Morgan Evans
12 November	Things That We Drink To	Morgan Evans
19 November	Experiment	Kane Brown
26 November	Room to Spare: The Acoustic Sessions	Kip Moore
3 December	Born to Fight	Karise Eden
10 December	Graffiti U	Keith Urban
17 December	Graffiti U	Keith Urban
24 December	Graffiti U	Keith Urban
31 December	Graffiti U	Keith Urban

== See also ==
- 2018 in music
- List of number-one albums of 2018 (Australia)
