= List of number-one urban albums of 2018 (Australia) =

ARIA Charts number-one urban albums of 2018 < 2017 2019 >

Other Australian number-one charts of 2018
- albums
- singles
- urban singles
- dance singles
- club tracks
- digital tracks
- streaming tracks

Top Australian singles and albums of 2018
- Triple J Hottest 100
- top 25 singles
- top 25 albums

Kamikaze (Eminem) number one album multiple times 2018

This is a list of albums that reached number-one on the ARIA Urban Albums Chart in 2018. The ARIA Urban Albums Chart is a weekly chart that ranks the best-performing urban albums in Australia. It is published by the Australian Recording Industry Association (ARIA), an organisation that collects music data for the weekly ARIA Charts. To be eligible to appear on the chart, the recording must be an album of a predominantly urban nature.

== Chart history ==
Issue date	Album	Artist(s)	Reference
1 January	Revival	Eminem	
8 January	Revival	Eminem	
15 January	Revival	Eminem	
22 January	Revival	Eminem	
29 January	Revival	Eminem	
5 February	Stoney	Post Malone	
12 February	Man of the Woods	Justin Timberlake	
19 February	Man of the Woods	Justin Timberlake	
26 February	Stoney	Post Malone	
5 March	Stoney	Post Malone	
12 March	Black Panther: The Album	Various Artists	
19 March	Black Panther: The Album	Various Artists	
26 March	?	XXXTentacion	
2 April	?	XXXTentacion	
9 April	My Dear Melancholy,	The Weeknd	
16 April	Invasion of Privacy	Cardi B	
23 April	Invasion of Privacy	Cardi B	
30 April	KOD	J Cole	
7 May	Beerbongs & Bentleys	Post Malone	
14 May	Beerbongs & Bentleys	Post Malone	
21 May	Beerbongs & Bentleys	Post Malone	
28 May	Beerbongs & Bentleys	Post Malone	
4 June	Beerbongs & Bentleys	Post Malone	
11 June	Ye	Kanye West	
18 June	Beerbongs & Bentleys	Post Malone	
25 June	Beerbongs & Bentleys	Post Malone	
2 July	?	XXXTentacion	
9 July	Scorpion	Drake	
16 July	Scorpion	Drake	
23 July	Scorpion	Drake	
30 July	Scorpion	Drake	
6 August	Scorpion	Drake	
13 August	Astroworld	Travis Scott	
20 August	Scorpion	Drake	
27 August	Scorpion	Drake	
3 September	Scorpion	Drake	
10 September	Kamikaze	Eminem	
17 September	Kamikaze	Eminem	
24 September	Kamikaze	Eminem	
1 October	Kamikaze	Eminem	
8 October	Kamikaze	Eminem	
15 October	Kamikaze	Eminem	
22 October	Kamikaze	Eminem	
29 October	Kamikaze	Eminem	
5 November	Kamikaze	Eminem	
12 November	Kamikaze	Eminem	
19 November	Kamikaze	Eminem	
26 November	Kamikaze	Eminem	
3 December	Kamikaze	Eminem	
10 December	Kamikaze	Eminem	
17 December	Skins	XXXTentacion	
24 December	Kamikaze	Eminem	
31 December	Kamikaze	Eminem	

== Number-one artists ==
Position	Artist	Weeks at No. 1
1	Eminem	21
2	Post Malone	10
3	Drake	8
4	XXXTentacion	3
5	Cardi B	2
5	Justin Timberlake	2
6	J Cole	1
6	Kanye West	1
6	Travis Scott	1
6	The Weeknd	1
6	XXXTentacion	1

== See also ==
- 2018 in music
- List of number-one albums of 2018 (Australia)
