= Seth Everman =

Swedish musician and YouTuber (born 1993)

- Born: Set Erik Adrian Summanen; 19 October 1993 (age 32); Stockholm, Sweden
- Occupations: YouTuber; musician
- Musical career
- Instruments: Keyboards; drums; vocals

YouTube information
- Channel: Seth Everman
- Years active: 2013–2023
- Genres: Music; comedy
- Subscribers: 4.05 million
- Views: 503 million
- Last updated: 14 January 2026

Set Erik Adrian Summanen (born 19 October 1993), better known as Seth Everman, is a Swedish musician and former YouTuber. Noted for his habit of staring into the camera with a deadpan expression while performing his songs, he came to prominence for making comedic piano videos and parodies of popular songs. In November 2023, he went live on Twitch and YouTube for the final time before blacking out his social media profiles.

== Early life ==
Seth Everman was born Set Erik Adrian Summanen in Stockholm on 19 October 1993.

== Career ==
Everman created his YouTube channel in May 2013, but had gone viral on multiple occasions since 2006. Many of these viral videos did not show his face, but one that did was titled "Nyan Cat 10 HOURS REACTION VIDEO! (yes, I actually watched it for 10 hours)" and was published on 6 December 2011 on a channel called TheGamePro. It received over 1.5 million views and was re-uploaded to his Seth Everman channel as "my old secret videos" on 3 April 2018, accumulating another 2 million views.

In September 2015, Everman published a mashup on his Tumblr account of Drake's "Hotline Bling" combined with Nintendo 64 games such as The Legend of Zelda: Ocarina of Time, Super Mario 64, and Mario Kart. This post was his first viral video under the Seth Everman name, accumulating over 600,000 notes on the platform. The first video to go viral on the Seth Everman YouTube channel was called "When you're a classical pianist but you listened to hip hop once", posted on 13 February 2016. In the video, he turns a rendition of "Für Elise" into Eminem's "Mockingbird" and a rendition of "Moonlight Sonata" into Dr. Dre's "Still D.R.E.". The video has received over 31 million views as of September 2026.

In November 2019, Everman became the person with the most liked YouTube comment and the first comment to hit 1 million likes. Referencing his trademark shaved head, the comment reads "i'm the bald guy" and was left on the music video for Billie Eilish's "Bad Guy". As of January 2023, the comment has over 3.25 million likes.

On 1 January 2023, Everman announced that he would be stepping away from his YouTube channel at the end of the year to focus on other projects; he challenged himself to upload as much content as possible for the rest of the year, which he described as a chance to "make all the videos [he] never managed to make over the years". On 30 May, he announced that his final day of producing content would be 27 November. In the run-up to that date, he reposted clips of his previous videos each day as a kind of countdown. On 27 November, he held a six-hour live stream on YouTube and Twitch titled "Goodbye". When the livestream ended, his social media profile pictures were replaced with a simple black background.
