= List of number-one streaming tracks of 2019 (Australia) =

ARIA Charts number-one streaming tracks of 2019 < 2018 2020 >

Other Australian number-one charts of 2019
- albums
- singles
- urban singles
- dance singles
- club tracks
- digital tracks

Top Australian singles and albums of 2019
- Triple J Hottest 100
- top 25 singles
- top 25 albums

The ARIA Streaming Chart ranks the best-performing streaming tracks of Australia. It is published by Australian Recording Industry Association (ARIA), an organisation who collects music data for the weekly ARIA Charts.

== Chart history ==
Key
†	Indicates number-one streaming single of 2019

Issue date	Song	Artist(s)	Reference
7 January	"Sunflower"	Post Malone featuring Swae Lee	
14 January	"Sunflower"	Post Malone featuring Swae Lee	
21 January	"Sunflower"	Post Malone featuring Swae Lee	
28 January	"7 Rings"	Ariana Grande	
4 February	"7 Rings"	Ariana Grande	
11 February	"7 Rings"	Ariana Grande	
18 February	"7 Rings"	Ariana Grande	
25 February	"7 Rings"	Ariana Grande	
4 March	"7 Rings"	Ariana Grande	
11 March	"7 Rings"	Ariana Grande	
18 March	"Sucker"	Jonas Brothers	
25 March	"Sucker"	Jonas Brothers	
1 April	"Wow"	Post Malone	
8 April	"Bad Guy"	Billie Eilish	
15 April	"Old Town Road"	Lil Nas X	
22 April	"Old Town Road"	Lil Nas X	
29 April	"Old Town Road"	Lil Nas X	
6 May	"Old Town Road"	Lil Nas X	
13 May	"Old Town Road"	Lil Nas X	
20 May	"Old Town Road"	Lil Nas X	
27 May	"Old Town Road"	Lil Nas X	
3 June	"Old Town Road"	Lil Nas X	
10 June	"Old Town Road"	Lil Nas X	
17 June	"Old Town Road"	Lil Nas X	
24 June	"Old Town Road"	Lil Nas X	
1 July	"Old Town Road"	Lil Nas X	
8 July	"Señorita"	Shawn Mendes and Camila Cabello	
15 July	"Señorita"	Shawn Mendes and Camila Cabello	
22 July	"Señorita"	Shawn Mendes and Camila Cabello	
29 July	"Señorita"	Shawn Mendes and Camila Cabello	
5 August	"Dance Monkey" †	Tones and I	
12 August	"Dance Monkey" †	Tones and I	
19 August	"Dance Monkey" †	Tones and I	
26 August	"Dance Monkey" †	Tones and I	
2 September	"Dance Monkey" †	Tones and I	
9 September	"Dance Monkey" †	Tones and I	
16 September	"Dance Monkey" †	Tones and I	
23 September	"Dance Monkey" †	Tones and I	
30 September	"Dance Monkey" †	Tones and I	
7 October	"Dance Monkey" †	Tones and I	
14 October	"Dance Monkey" †	Tones and I	
21 October	"Dance Monkey" †	Tones and I	
28 October	"Dance Monkey" †	Tones and I	
4 November	"Dance Monkey" †	Tones and I	
11 November	"Dance Monkey" †	Tones and I	
18 November	"Dance Monkey" †	Tones and I	
25 November	"Dance Monkey" †	Tones and I	
2 December	"Dance Monkey" †	Tones and I	
9 December	"Dance Monkey" †	Tones and I	
16 December	"Dance Monkey" †	Tones and I	
23 December	"Dance Monkey" †	Tones and I	
30 December	"All I Want for Christmas Is You"	Mariah Carey	

== See also ==
- 2019 in music
- ARIA Charts
- List of number-one singles of 2019 (Australia)
