= List of number-one digital tracks of 2019 (Australia) =

ARIA Charts number-one digital tracks of 2019 < 2018 2020 >

Other Australian number-one charts of 2019
- albums
- singles
- urban singles
- dance singles
- club tracks
- streaming tracks

Top Australian singles and albums of 2019
- Triple J Hottest 100
- top 25 singles
- top 25 albums

The ARIA Digital Track Chart is a chart that ranks the best-performing digital tracks singles of Australia. It is published by Australian Recording Industry Association (ARIA), an organisation who collect music data for the weekly ARIA Charts. To be eligible to appear on the chart, the recording must be a single not an EP and only paid downloads counted from downloadable outlets.

== Chart history ==
Issue date	Song	Artist(s)	Reference
7 January	"Shotgun"	George Ezra	
14 January	"Shallow"	Lady Gaga and Bradley Cooper	
21 January	"Sweet but Psycho"	Ava Max	
28 January	"7 Rings"	Ariana Grande	
4 February	"Shallow"	Lady Gaga and Bradley Cooper	
11 February	"Shallow"	Lady Gaga and Bradley Cooper	
18 February	"Shallow"	Lady Gaga and Bradley Cooper	
25 February	"Shallow"	Lady Gaga and Bradley Cooper	
4 March	"Shallow"	Lady Gaga and Bradley Cooper	
11 March	"Shallow"	Lady Gaga and Bradley Cooper	
18 March	"Walk Me Home"	Pink	
25 March	"Walk Me Home"	Pink	
1 April	"Walk Me Home"	Pink	
8 April	"Sucker"	Jonas Brothers	
15 April	"Bad Guy"	Billie Eilish	
22 April	"Bad Guy"	Billie Eilish	
29 April	"Bad Guy"	Billie Eilish	
6 May	"Me!"	Taylor Swift featuring Brendon Urie	
13 May	"Old Town Road"	Lil Nas X	
20 May	"I Don't Care"	Ed Sheeran and Justin Bieber	
27 May	"I Don't Care"	Ed Sheeran and Justin Bieber	
3 June	"Old Town Road"	Lil Nas X	
10 June	"Old Town Road"	Lil Nas X	
17 June	"Old Town Road"	Lil Nas X	
24 June	"Old Town Road"	Lil Nas X	
1 July	"Old Town Road"	Lil Nas X	
8 July	"Old Town Road"	Lil Nas X	
15 July	"Old Town Road"	Lil Nas X	
22 July	"Old Town Road"	Lil Nas X	
29 July	"Dance Monkey"	Tones and I	
5 August	"Dance Monkey"	Tones and I	
12 August	"Dance Monkey"	Tones and I	
19 August	"Dance Monkey"	Tones and I	
26 August	"Dance Monkey"	Tones and I	
2 September	"Dance Monkey"	Tones and I	
9 September	"Dance Monkey"	Tones and I	
16 September	"Dance Monkey"	Tones and I	
23 September	"Dance Monkey"	Tones and I	
30 September	"Dance Monkey"	Tones and I	
7 October	"Dance Monkey"	Tones and I	
14 October	"Dance Monkey"	Tones and I	
21 October	"Dance Monkey"	Tones and I	
28 October	"Dance Monkey"	Tones and I	
4 November	"Dance Monkey"	Tones and I	
11 November	"Dance Monkey"	Tones and I	
18 November	"Memories"	Maroon 5	
25 November	"Dance Monkey"	Tones And I	
2 December	"Dance Monkey"	Tones And I	
9 December	"Dance Monkey"	Tones And I	
16 December	"Dance Monkey"	Tones And I	
23 December	"Dance Monkey"	Tones And I	
30 December	"Dance Monkey"	Tones And I	

== Number-one artists ==
Position	Artist	Weeks at No. 1
1	Tones and I	22
2	Lil Nas X	9
3	Lady Gaga	7
3	Bradley Cooper	7
4	Billie Eilish	3
4	Pink	3
5	Ed Sheeran	2
5	Justin Bieber	2
6	Ariana Grande	1
6	Ava Max	1
6	George Ezra	1
6	Jonas Brothers	1
6	Taylor Swift	1
6	Brendon Urie (as featuring)	1
6	Maroon 5	1

== See also ==
- 2019 in music
- ARIA Charts
- List of number-one singles of 2019 (Australia)
