= List of number-one urban singles of 2019 (Australia) =

ARIA Charts number-one urban singles of 2019 < 2018 2020 >

Other Australian number-one charts of 2019
- albums
- singles
- dance singles
- club tracks
- digital tracks
- streaming tracks

Top Australian singles and albums of 2019
- Triple J Hottest 100
- top 25 singles
- top 25 albums

The ARIA Urban Chart is a chart that ranks the best-performing Urban tracks singles of Australia. It is published by the Australian Recording Industry Association (ARIA), an organisation who collect music data for the weekly ARIA Charts. To be eligible to appear on the chart, the recording must be a single of a predominantly urban nature.

== Chart history ==
Issue date	Song	Artist(s)	Reference
7 January	"Sunflower"	Post Malone and Swae Lee	
14 January	"Sunflower"	Post Malone and Swae Lee	
21 January	"Sunflower"	Post Malone and Swae Lee	
28 January	"Sunflower"	Post Malone and Swae Lee	
4 February	"Sunflower"	Post Malone and Swae Lee	
11 February	"Sunflower"	Post Malone and Swae Lee	
18 February	"Sunflower"	Post Malone and Swae Lee	
25 February	"Sunflower"	Post Malone and Swae Lee	
4 March	"Sunflower"	Post Malone and Swae Lee	
11 March	"Sunflower"	Post Malone and Swae Lee	
18 March	"Wow"	Post Malone	
25 March	"Sunflower"	Post Malone and Swae Lee	
1 April	"Wow"	Post Malone	
8 April	"Wow"	Post Malone	
15 April	"Old Town Road"	Lil Nas X	
22 April	"Old Town Road"	Lil Nas X	
29 April	"Old Town Road"	Lil Nas X	
6 May	"Old Town Road"	Lil Nas X	
13 May	"Old Town Road"	Lil Nas X	
20 May	"Old Town Road"	Lil Nas X	
27 May	"Old Town Road"	Lil Nas X	
3 June	"Old Town Road"	Lil Nas X	
10 June	"Old Town Road"	Lil Nas X	
17 June	"Old Town Road"	Lil Nas X	
24 June	"Old Town Road"	Lil Nas X	
1 July	"Old Town Road"	Lil Nas X	
8 July	"Old Town Road"	Lil Nas X	
15 July	"Old Town Road"	Lil Nas X	
22 July	"Old Town Road"	Lil Nas X	
29 July	"Old Town Road"	Lil Nas X	
5 August	"Old Town Road"	Lil Nas X	
12 August	"Old Town Road"	Lil Nas X	
19 August	"Old Town Road"	Lil Nas X	
26 August	"Old Town Road"	Lil Nas X	
2 September	"Old Town Road"	Lil Nas X	
9 September	"Old Town Road"	Lil Nas X	
16 September	"Circles"	Post Malone	
23 September	"Circles"	Post Malone	
30 September	"Circles"	Post Malone	
7 October	"Circles"	Post Malone	
14 October	"Circles"	Post Malone	
21 October	"Circles"	Post Malone	
28 October	"Circles"	Post Malone	
4 November	"Circles"	Post Malone	
11 November	"Circles"	Post Malone	
18 November	"Circles"	Post Malone	
25 November	"Roxanne"	Arizona Zervas	
2 December	"Roxanne"	Arizona Zervas	
9 December	"Roxanne"	Arizona Zervas	
16 December	"Roxanne"	Arizona Zervas	
23 December	"Roxanne"	Arizona Zervas	
30 December	"Roxanne"	Arizona Zervas	

== See also ==
- 2019 in music
- List of number-one singles of 2019 (Australia)
