= List of number-one singles of 2019 (Australia) =

ARIA Charts number-one singles of 2019 < 2018 2020 >

Other Australian number-one charts of 2019
- albums
- urban singles
- dance singles
- club tracks
- digital tracks
- streaming tracks

Top Australian singles and albums of 2019
- Triple J Hottest 100
- top 25 singles
- top 25 albums

The ARIA Singles Chart ranks the best-performing singles in Australia. Its data, published by the Australian Recording Industry Association, is based collectively on the weekly physical and digital sales and streams of singles. In 2019, 10 songs reached number one, with "Dance Monkey" by Tones and I the longest-running. Six acts, Swae Lee, Jonas Brothers, Billie Eilish, Lil Nas X, Shawn Mendes and Tones and I, reached the top spot for the first time. With 10 weeks atop the chart, Tones and I's song "Dance Monkey" broke the record for the most weeks at number one by an Australian artist, which was previously held by Justice Crew's 2014 song "Que Sera". In November, the song reached 16 weeks at number one, breaking the record for most weeks at number one in Australian chart history, previous held by Ed Sheeran's "Shape of You" (2017). It spent 21 weeks atop the chart.

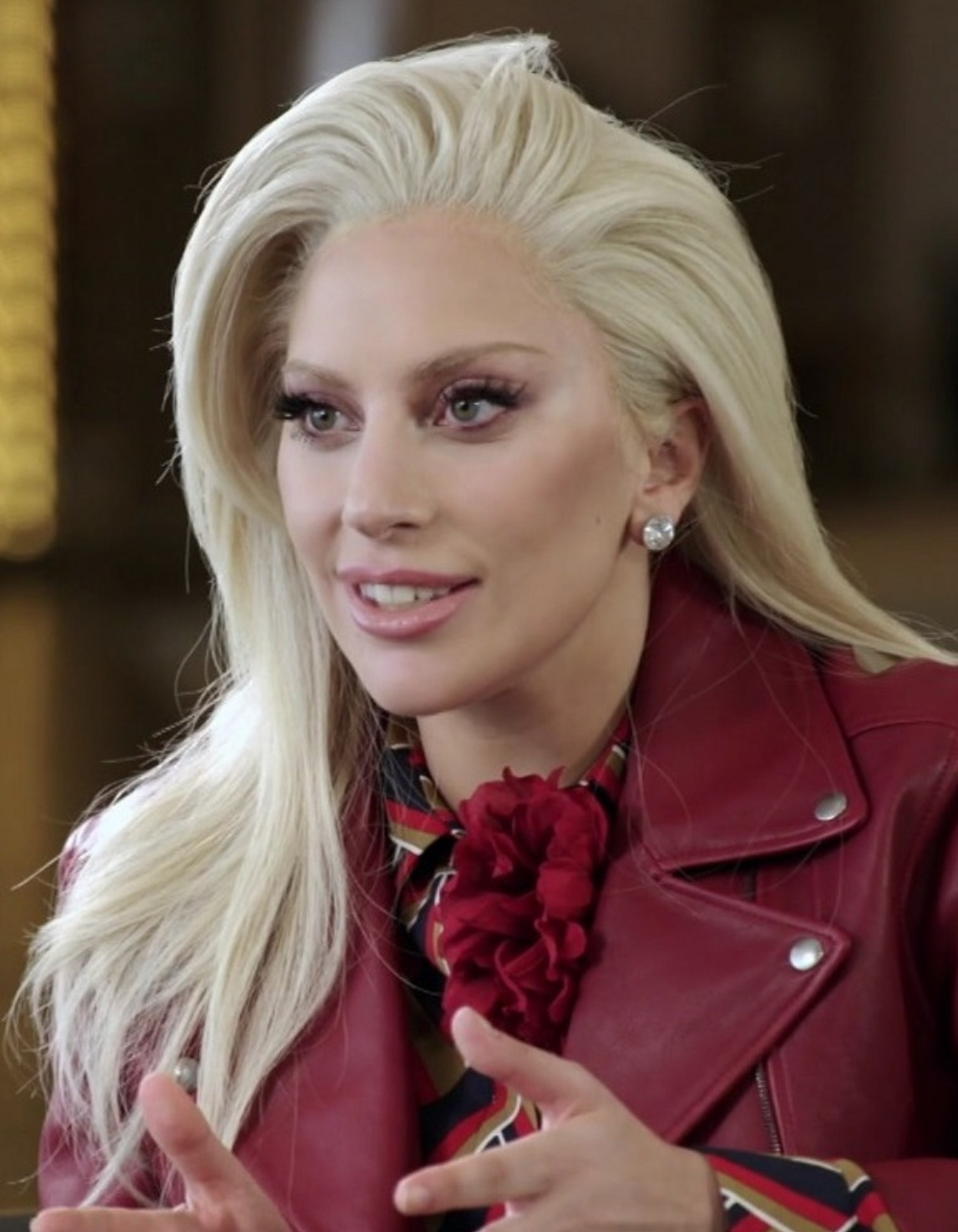
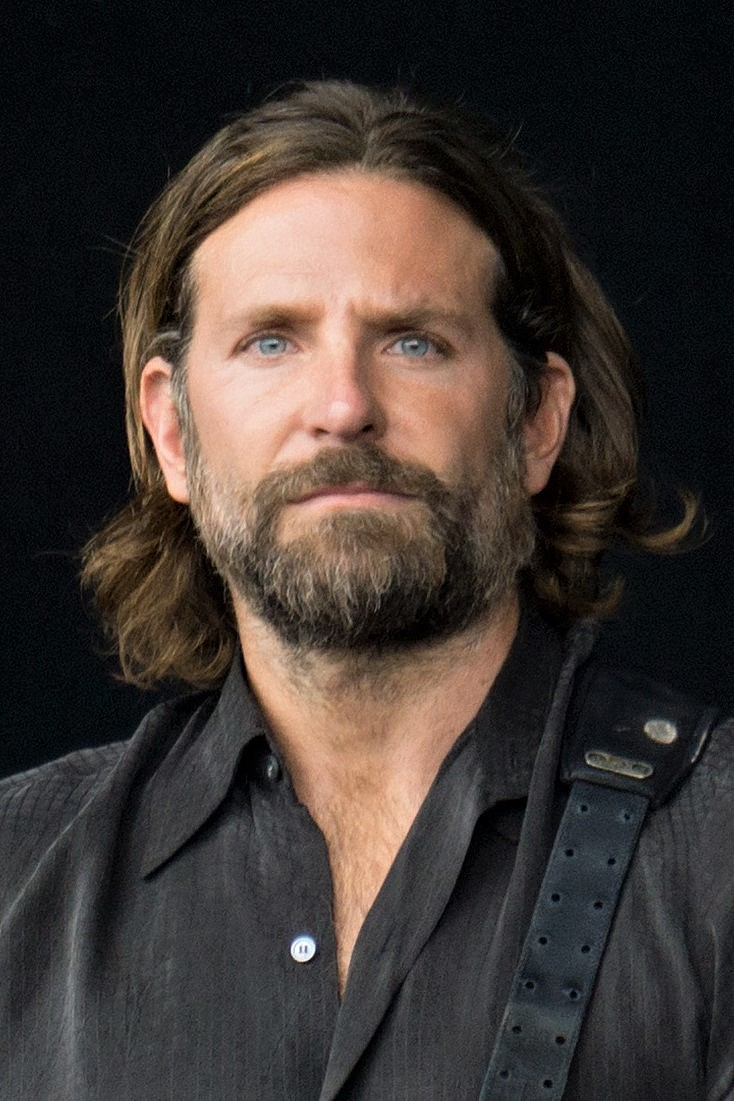
American singer Lady Gaga (left) and American actor Bradley Cooper (right) returned to number 1 on the chart for a second time in March 2019 with their single "Shallow" after a critically acclaimed performance of the song at the 91st Academy Awards. It initially reached the top spot in October 2018.

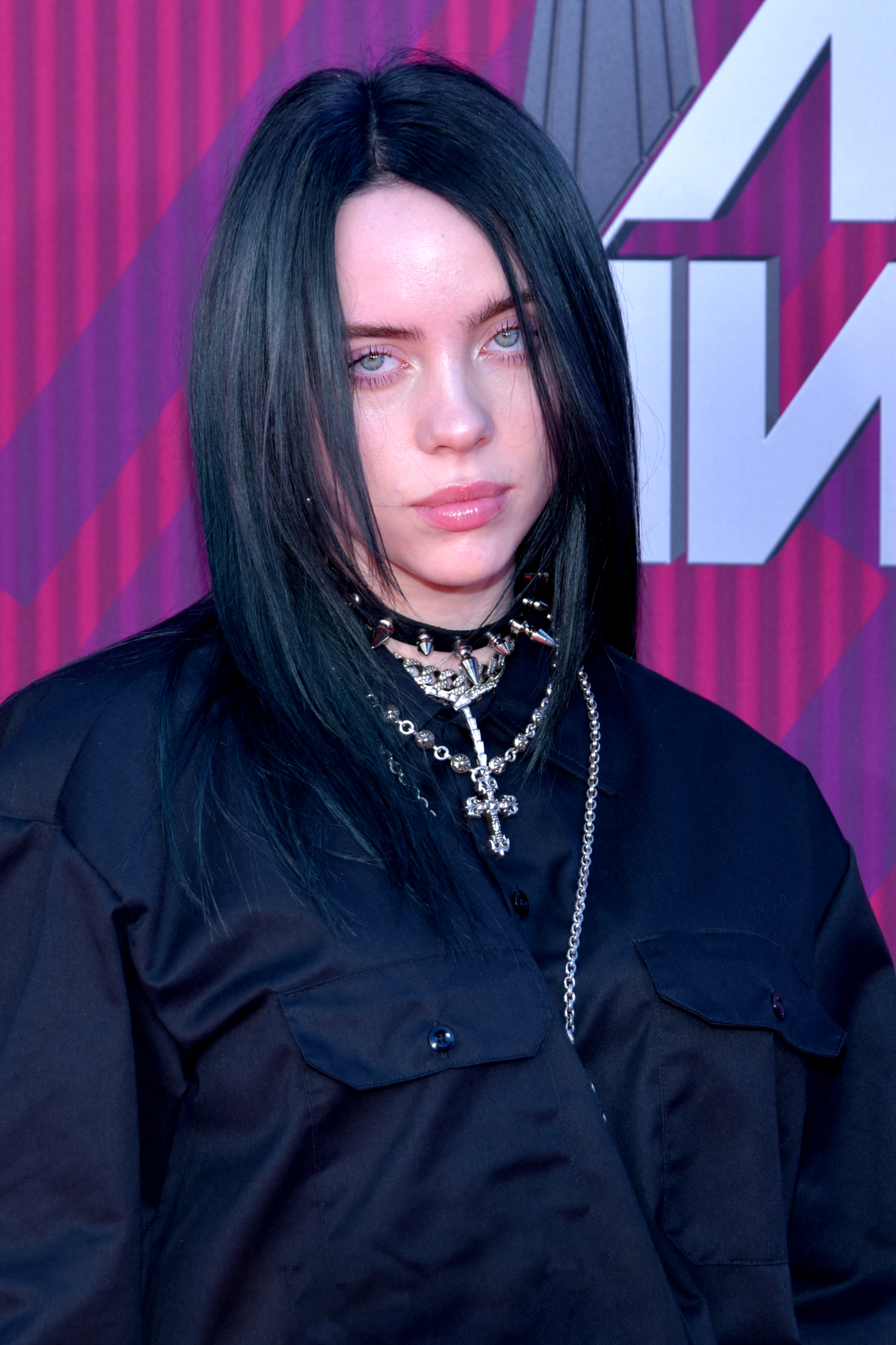
American singer Billie Eilish earned her first number 1 single with Bad Guy". It spent two weeks at number 1 in April 2019.

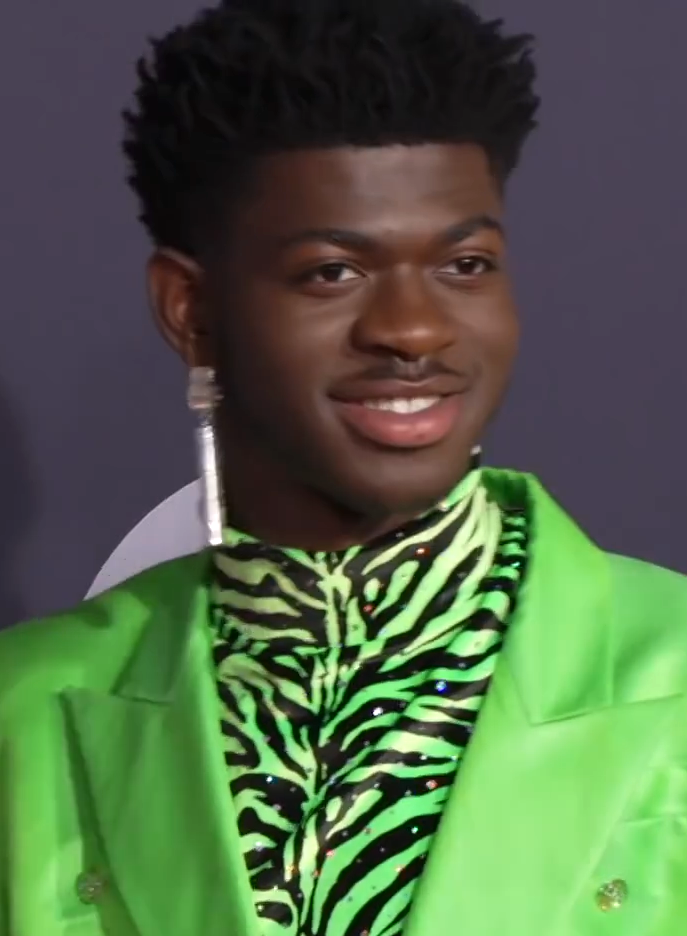
American rapper Lil Nas X reached number 1 with his debut single "Old Town Road", spending thirteen non-consecutive weeks at number 1.

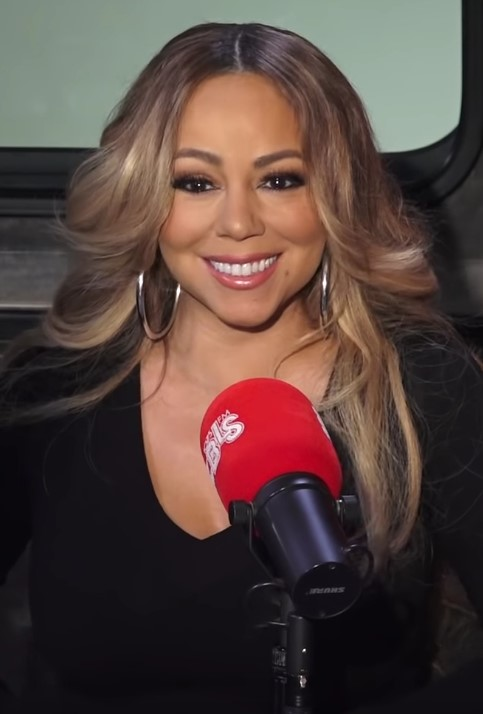
American singer Mariah Carey returned to number 1 a year later with her 1994 single, "All I Want for Christmas Is You" which first topped the chart in December 2018. It was the final single to top the chart in 2019 and the final number 1 single of the 2010s.

== Chart history ==
Key
†	Indicates best-performing single of 2019

Issue date	Song	Artist(s)	Ref.
7 January	"Sunflower"	Post Malone and Swae Lee	
14 January	"Sunflower"	Post Malone and Swae Lee	
21 January	"Sunflower"	Post Malone and Swae Lee	
28 January	"7 Rings"	Ariana Grande	
4 February	"7 Rings"	Ariana Grande	
11 February	"7 Rings"	Ariana Grande	
18 February	"7 Rings"	Ariana Grande	
25 February	"7 Rings"	Ariana Grande	
4 March	"Shallow"	Lady Gaga and Bradley Cooper	
11 March	"Shallow"	Lady Gaga and Bradley Cooper	
18 March	"Sucker"	Jonas Brothers	
25 March	"Sucker"	Jonas Brothers	
1 April	"Sucker"	Jonas Brothers	
8 April	"Bad Guy"	Billie Eilish	
15 April	"Bad Guy"	Billie Eilish	
22 April	"Old Town Road" †	Lil Nas X	
29 April	"Old Town Road" †	Lil Nas X	
6 May	"Old Town Road" †	Lil Nas X	
13 May	"Old Town Road" †	Lil Nas X	
20 May	"I Don't Care"	Ed Sheeran and Justin Bieber	
27 May	"Old Town Road" †	Lil Nas X featuring Billy Ray Cyrus	
3 June	"Old Town Road" †	Lil Nas X featuring Billy Ray Cyrus	
10 June	"Old Town Road" †	Lil Nas X featuring Billy Ray Cyrus	
17 June	"Old Town Road" †	Lil Nas X featuring Billy Ray Cyrus	
24 June	"Old Town Road" †	Lil Nas X featuring Billy Ray Cyrus	
1 July	"Old Town Road" †	Lil Nas X featuring Billy Ray Cyrus	
8 July	"Old Town Road" †	Lil Nas X featuring Billy Ray Cyrus	
15 July	"Old Town Road" †	Lil Nas X featuring Billy Ray Cyrus	
22 July	"Old Town Road" †	Lil Nas X featuring Billy Ray Cyrus	
29 July	"Señorita"	Shawn Mendes and Camila Cabello	
5 August	"Dance Monkey"	Tones and I	
12 August	"Dance Monkey"	Tones and I	
19 August	"Dance Monkey"	Tones and I	
26 August	"Dance Monkey"	Tones and I	
2 September	"Dance Monkey"	Tones and I	
9 September	"Dance Monkey"	Tones and I	
16 September	"Dance Monkey"	Tones and I	
23 September	"Dance Monkey"	Tones and I	
30 September	"Dance Monkey"	Tones and I	
7 October	"Dance Monkey"	Tones and I	
14 October	"Dance Monkey"	Tones and I	
21 October	"Dance Monkey"	Tones and I	
28 October	"Dance Monkey"	Tones and I	
4 November	"Dance Monkey"	Tones and I	
11 November	"Dance Monkey"	Tones and I	
18 November	"Dance Monkey"	Tones and I	
25 November	"Dance Monkey"	Tones and I	
2 December	"Dance Monkey"	Tones and I	
9 December	"Dance Monkey"	Tones and I	
16 December	"Dance Monkey"	Tones and I	
23 December	"Dance Monkey"	Tones and I	
30 December	"All I Want for Christmas Is You"	Mariah Carey	

== Number-one artists ==
Position	Artist	Weeks at No. 1
1	Tones and I	21
2	Lil Nas X	13
3	Ariana Grande	5
4	Post Malone	3
4	Swae Lee	3
4	Jonas Brothers	3
5	Lady Gaga	2
5	Bradley Cooper	2
5	Billie Eilish	2
6	Ed Sheeran	1
6	Justin Bieber	1
6	Shawn Mendes	1
6	Camila Cabello	1
6	Mariah Carey	1

== See also ==
- 2019 in music
- List of number-one albums of 2019 (Australia)
- List of top 10 singles in 2019 (Australia)
