= List of number-one dance singles of 2019 (Australia) =

ARIA Charts number-one dance singles of 2019 < 2018 2020 >

Other Australian number-one charts of 2019
- albums
- singles
- urban singles
- club tracks
- digital tracks
- streaming tracks

Top Australian singles and albums of 2019
- Triple J Hottest 100
- top 25 singles
- top 25 albums

The ARIA Dance Chart is a chart that ranks the best-performing dance singles of Australia. It is published by Australian Recording Industry Association (ARIA), an organisation who collect music data for the weekly ARIA Charts. To be eligible to appear on the chart, the recording must be a single, and be "predominantly of a dance nature, or with a featured track of a dance nature, or included in the ARIA Club Chart or a comparable overseas chart".

== Chart history ==
Date	Song	Artist(s)	Ref.
7 January	"Nothing Breaks Like a Heart"	Mark Ronson featuring Miley Cyrus	
14 January	"Nothing Breaks Like a Heart"	Mark Ronson featuring Miley Cyrus	
21 January	"Nothing Breaks Like a Heart"	Mark Ronson featuring Miley Cyrus	
28 January	"Nothing Breaks Like a Heart"	Mark Ronson featuring Miley Cyrus	
4 February	"Nothing Breaks Like a Heart"	Mark Ronson featuring Miley Cyrus	
11 February	"Nothing Breaks Like a Heart"	Mark Ronson featuring Miley Cyrus	
18 February	"Nothing Breaks Like a Heart"	Mark Ronson featuring Miley Cyrus	
25 February	"Nothing Breaks Like a Heart"	Mark Ronson featuring Miley Cyrus	
4 March	"Who Do You Love"	The Chainsmokers featuring 5 Seconds of Summer	
11 March	"Who Do You Love"	The Chainsmokers featuring 5 Seconds of Summer	
18 March	"Who Do You Love"	The Chainsmokers featuring 5 Seconds of Summer	
25 March	"Who Do You Love"	The Chainsmokers featuring 5 Seconds of Summer	
1 April	"Who Do You Love"	The Chainsmokers featuring 5 Seconds of Summer	
8 April	"Who Do You Love"	The Chainsmokers featuring 5 Seconds of Summer	
15 April	"Who Do You Love"	The Chainsmokers featuring 5 Seconds of Summer	
22 April	"SOS"	Avicii featuring Aloe Blacc	
29 April	"SOS"	Avicii featuring Aloe Blacc	
6 May	"SOS"	Avicii featuring Aloe Blacc	
13 May	"SOS"	Avicii featuring Aloe Blacc	
20 May	"SOS"	Avicii featuring Aloe Blacc	
27 May	"SOS"	Avicii featuring Aloe Blacc	
3 June	"SOS"	Avicii featuring Aloe Blacc	
10 June	"SOS"	Avicii featuring Aloe Blacc	
17 June	"SOS"	Avicii featuring Aloe Blacc	
24 June	"Piece of Your Heart"	Meduza featuring Goodboys	
1 July	"Piece of Your Heart"	Meduza featuring Goodboys	
8 July	"Piece of Your Heart"	Meduza featuring Goodboys	
15 July	"Piece of Your Heart"	Meduza featuring Goodboys	
22 July	"Piece of Your Heart"	Meduza featuring Goodboys	
29 July	"Piece of Your Heart"	Meduza featuring Goodboys	
5 August	"Piece of Your Heart"	Meduza featuring Goodboys	
12 August	"Piece of Your Heart"	Meduza featuring Goodboys	
19 August	"Piece of Your Heart"	Meduza featuring Goodboys	
26 August	"One Thing Right"	Marshmello and Kane Brown	
2 September	"One Thing Right"	Marshmello and Kane Brown	
9 September	"One Thing Right"	Marshmello and Kane Brown	
16 September	"One Thing Right"	Marshmello and Kane Brown	
23 September	"One Thing Right"	Marshmello and Kane Brown	
30 September	"One Thing Right"	Marshmello and Kane Brown	
7 October	"One Thing Right"	Marshmello and Kane Brown	
14 October	"One Thing Right"	Marshmello and Kane Brown	
21 October	"Ride It"	Regard	
28 October	"Ride It"	Regard	
4 November	"Ride It"	Regard	
11 November	"Ride It"	Regard	
18 November	"Ride It"	Regard	
25 November	"Ride It"	Regard	
2 December	"Ride It"	Regard	
9 December	"Ride It"	Regard	
16 December	"Ride It"	Regard	
23 December	"Ride It"	Regard	
30 December	"Ride It"	Regard	

== Number-one artists ==
Position	Artist	Weeks at No. 1
1	Regard	11
2	Avicii	9
2	Meduza	9
2	Goodboys (as featuring)	9
3	Marshmello	8
4	Mark Ronson	7
4	Miley Cyrus (as featuring)	7
4	The Chainsmokers	7

== See also ==
- ARIA Charts
- 2019 in music
