= List of number-one club tracks of 2019 (Australia) =

ARIA Charts number-one club tracks of 2019 < 2018 2020 >

Other Australian number-one charts of 2019
- albums
- singles
- urban singles
- dance singles
- digital tracks
- streaming tracks

Top Australian singles and albums of 2019
- Triple J Hottest 100
- top 25 singles
- top 25 albums

This is the list of number-one tracks on the ARIA Club Chart in 2019, which is compiled by the Australian Recording Industry Association (ARIA) from weekly DJ reports.

== 2019 ==
Date		Song	Artist(s)	Reference
January	7	"Faith"	Benson featuring Stace Cadet and Yeah Boy	
January	14	"Dance and Chant"	Yolanda Be Cool	
January	21	"Dance and Chant"	Yolanda Be Cool	
January	28	"Dance and Chant"	Yolanda Be Cool	
February	4	"Dance and Chant"	Yolanda Be Cool	
February	11	"Dance and Chant"	Yolanda Be Cool	
February	18	"Sometime"	Lo'99 featuring Owl Eyes	
February	25	"Sometime"	Lo'99 featuring Owl Eyes	
March	4	"Lover"	Digital Remedy featuring Jolyon Petch	
March	11	"Lover"	Digital Remedy featuring Jolyon Petch	
March	18	"Giant"	Calvin Harris and Rag'n'Bone Man	
March	25	"Giant"	Calvin Harris and Rag'n'Bone Man	
April	1	"Giant"	Calvin Harris and Rag'n'Bone Man	
April	8	"Ocean"	Beth Yen featuring The Baroness	
April	15	"Ocean"	Beth Yen featuring The Baroness	
April	22	"Ocean"	Beth Yen featuring The Baroness	
April	29	"Body Funk"	Purple Disco Machine	
May	6	"Body Funk"	Purple Disco Machine	
May	13	"Body Funk"	Purple Disco Machine	
May	20	"Spinning Sax"	Jared Marston featuring The Blowfisch Saxophone	
May	27	"Focus"	Bonka	
June	3	"You Little Beauty"	Fisher	
June	10	"You Little Beauty"	Fisher	
June	17	"You Little Beauty"	Fisher	
June	24	"You Little Beauty"	Fisher	
July	1	"You Little Beauty"	Fisher	
July	8	"You Little Beauty"	Fisher	
July	15	"Africa"	Lost Fields	
July	22	"Africa"	Lost Fields	
July	29	"Big Love"	Pete Heller's Big Love	
August	5	"Big Love"	Pete Heller's Big Love	
August	12	"Big Love"	Pete Heller's Big Love	
August	19	"Big Love"	Pete Heller's Big Love	
August	26	"In Your Mind"	Harpoon featuring iDo	
September	2	"In Your Mind"	Harpoon featuring iDo	
September	9	"Be Free"	Airwolf	
September	16	"Teach Me"	Holmes John and Jacky	
September	23	"On the Edge"	Needs No Sleep and Wildfire	
September	30	"Joys"	Roberto Surace	
October	7	"Joys"	Roberto Surace	
October	14	"Caught Up"	Wongo featuring She Koro	
October	21	"Joys"	Roberto Surace	
October	28	"Rebel Love"	Murph & Petch featuring Amy Pearson	
November	4	"Rebel Love"	Murph & Petch featuring Amy Pearson	
November	11	"San Frandisco"	Dom Dolla	
November	18	"San Frandisco"	Dom Dolla	
November	25	"Get on It"	Stace Cadet featuring KLP	
December	2	"Stay High"	Lo'99 featuring Doolie	
December	9	"Don't Call Me Baby" (20th Anniversary Edition)	Madison Avenue	
December	16	"Don't Call Me Baby" (20th Anniversary Edition)	Madison Avenue	
December	23	"So in Love with You"	Andy Murphy and Ed Colman featuring Zak Love	

== Number-one artists ==
Position	Artist	Weeks at No. 1
1	Fisher	6
2	Yolanda Be Cool	5
3	Pete Heller	4
4	Calvin Harris	3
4	Rag'n'Bone Man	3
4	Beth Yen	3
4	The Baroness	3
4	Purple Disco Machine	3
4	Roberto Surace	3
4	Lo'99	3
5	Owl Eyes	2
5	Digital Remedy	2
5	Lost Fields	2
5	Harpoon	2
5	iDo	2
5	Murph & Petch	2
5	Amy Pearson	2
5	Dom Dolla	2
5	Stace Cadet	2
5	Madison Avenue	2
6	Benson	1
6	Yeah Boy	1
6	Jared Marston	1
6	The Blowfisch Saxophone	1
6	Bonka	1
6	Airwolf	1
6	Holmes John	1
6	Jacky	1
6	Needs No Sleep	1
6	Wildfire	1
6	Wongo	1
6	She Koro	1
6	KLP	1
6	Doolie	1
6	Andy Murphy	1
6	Ed Colman	1
6	Zak Love	1

== See also ==
- ARIA Charts
- 2019 in music
