= List of number-one albums of 2019 (Australia) =

ARIA Charts number-one albums of 2019 < 2018 2020 >

Other Australian number-one charts of 2019
- singles
- urban singles
- dance singles
- club tracks
- digital tracks
- streaming tracks

Top Australian singles and albums of 2019
- Triple J Hottest 100
- top 25 singles
- top 25 albums

The ARIA Albums Chart ranks the best-performing albums and extended plays (EPs) in Australia. Its data, published by the Australian Recording Industry Association, is based collectively on the weekly physical and digital sales of albums and EPs. In 2019, 27 albums claimed the top spot; the soundtrack for the 2018 film Bohemian Rhapsody by Queen was the first number one of the year. Five acts, Dean Lewis, Billie Eilish, BTS, Conrad Sewell and Luke Combs, reached the top spot for the first time.

== Chart history ==
Key
†	Indicates best-performing album of 2019

Date	Album	Artist(s)	Ref.
7 January	Bohemian Rhapsody: The Original Soundtrack	Queen	
14 January	Bohemian Rhapsody: The Original Soundtrack	Queen	
21 January	Bohemian Rhapsody: The Original Soundtrack	Queen	
28 January	Bohemian Rhapsody: The Original Soundtrack	Queen	
4 February	Amo	Bring Me the Horizon	
11 February	A Star Is Born	Lady Gaga and Bradley Cooper	
18 February	Thank U, Next	Ariana Grande	
25 February	Thank U, Next	Ariana Grande	
4 March	The Great Expanse	Hilltop Hoods	
11 March	Thank U, Next	Ariana Grande	
18 March	Thank U, Next	Ariana Grande	
25 March	Thank U, Next	Ariana Grande	
1 April	A Place We Knew	Dean Lewis	
8 April	When We All Fall Asleep, Where Do We Go? †	Billie Eilish	
15 April	When We All Fall Asleep, Where Do We Go? †	Billie Eilish	
22 April	Map of the Soul: Persona	BTS	
29 April	When We All Fall Asleep, Where Do We Go? †	Billie Eilish	
6 May	Hurts 2B Human	Pink	
13 May	Hurts 2B Human	Pink	
20 May	Hurts 2B Human	Pink	
27 May	Life	Conrad Sewell	
3 June	When We All Fall Asleep, Where Do We Go? †	Billie Eilish	
10 June	My Criminal Record	Jimmy Barnes	
17 June	When We All Fall Asleep, Where Do We Go? †	Billie Eilish	
24 June	Western Stars	Bruce Springsteen	
1 July	When We All Fall Asleep, Where Do We Go? †	Billie Eilish	
8 July	Step Back in Time: The Definitive Collection	Kylie Minogue	
15 July	When We All Fall Asleep, Where Do We Go? †	Billie Eilish	
22 July	No.6 Collaborations Project	Ed Sheeran	
29 July	No.6 Collaborations Project	Ed Sheeran	
5 August	No.6 Collaborations Project	Ed Sheeran	
12 August	No.6 Collaborations Project	Ed Sheeran	
19 August	We Are Not Your Kind	Slipknot	
26 August	No.6 Collaborations Project	Ed Sheeran	
2 September	Lover	Taylor Swift	
9 September	Fear Inoculum	Tool	
16 September	Hollywood's Bleeding	Post Malone	
23 September	Hollywood's Bleeding	Post Malone	
30 September	Hollywood's Bleeding	Post Malone	
7 October	Hollywood's Bleeding	Post Malone	
14 October	Hollywood's Bleeding	Post Malone	
21 October	Hollywood's Bleeding	Post Malone	
28 October	Hilda	Jessica Mauboy	
4 November	Jesus Is King	Kanye West	
11 November	Jesus Is King	Kanye West	
18 November	What You See Is What You Get	Luke Combs	
25 November	Songs from the South: 1985–2019	Paul Kelly	
2 December	Everyday Life	Coldplay	
9 December	The Christmas Present	Robbie Williams	
16 December	Blood Moon	Cold Chisel	
23 December	Fine Line	Harry Styles	
30 December	Christmas	Michael Bublé	

== Number-one artists ==
Position	Artist	Weeks at No. 1
1	Billie Eilish	7
2	Post Malone	6
3	Ariana Grande	5
3	Ed Sheeran	5
4	Queen	4
5	Pink	3
6	Kanye West	2
7	Bring Me the Horizon	1
7	Lady Gaga	1
7	Bradley Cooper	1
7	Hilltop Hoods	1
7	Dean Lewis	1
7	BTS	1
7	Conrad Sewell	1
7	Jimmy Barnes	1
7	Bruce Springsteen	1
7	Kylie Minogue	1
7	Slipknot	1
7	Taylor Swift	1
7	Tool	1
7	Jessica Mauboy	1
7	Luke Combs	1
7	Paul Kelly	1
7	Coldplay	1
7	Robbie Williams	1
7	Cold Chisel	1
7	Harry Styles	1
7	Michael Bublé	1

== See also ==
- 2019 in music
- List of number-one singles of 2019 (Australia)
