= 7 Rings =

2019 single by Ariana Grande

Single by Ariana Grande

from the album Thank U, Next
- Released: January 18, 2019
- Recorded: October 2018
- Studio: Jungle City (New York City); The Record Plant (Hollywood)
- Genre: Trap-pop; R&B
- Length: 2:58
- Label: Republic
- Songwriters: Ariana Grande; Victoria Monét; Tayla Parx; Tommy Brown; Charles Anderson; Michael Foster; Njomza Vitia; Kimberly Krysiuk; Richard Rodgers; Oscar Hammerstein II
- Producers: Tommy Brown; Charles Anderson; Michael Foster

Ariana Grande singles chronology
"Thank U, Next" (2018)	"7 Rings" (2019)	"Break Up with Your Girlfriend, I'm Bored" (2019)

Music video
- "7 Rings" on YouTube

"7 Rings" (stylized in all lowercase) is a song by the American singer-songwriter Ariana Grande. It was released on January 18, 2019, by Republic Records as the second single from her fifth studio album, Thank U, Next (2019). The song was written by Grande, Victoria Monét, Tayla Parx, Njomza, and Kaydence, alongside its producers Tommy Brown, Charles Anderson, and Michael Foster, with additional writing credits going to Rodgers and Hammerstein for an interpolation of their showtune "My Favorite Things" from The Sound of Music.

"7 Rings" broke numerous streaming records upon release. It debuted at number-one on the Billboard Hot 100, becoming Grande's second consecutive number-one in the United States. The single ultimately became her top-performing song on the chart, spending eight weeks at number one and 33 weeks on the chart overall. It has been certified as Diamond by the RIAA, Grande's first solo single and overall second single to be certified Diamond. Globally, the song reached the number one spot on record charts in over 20 countries, as well as the top ten in 10 other countries. As of March 2026, "7 Rings" ranks as the nineteenth most streamed song in Apple Music history and in the top 100 most streamed songs on Spotify with over 2.9 billion streams. With sales of over 13.3 million copies worldwide as of December 2019, "7 Rings" is one of the best-selling songs in digital history.

The song received nominations for Record of the Year and Best Pop Solo Performance at the 62nd Annual Grammy Awards. Its accompanying music video, directed by Hannah Lux Davis, was critically acclaimed and won Best Art Direction at the 2019 MTV Video Music Awards. A remix of the song, featuring American rapper 2 Chainz, was released on February 1, 2019.

== Background and release ==
A few weeks prior to the track's release, Republic Records contacted Imagem/Concord Music, who owns the Rodgers & Hammerstein publishing rights, and agreed to give them 90 percent of the song's songwriting royalties, in order to acquire the rights to release the song. Grande first teased the track in the music video for "Thank U, Next", in which the first few seconds of the instrumental are used in the opening sequence, and the license plate of the car she drives reads "7 RINGS". The day after the video was released, Grande confirmed the existence of "7 Rings" and revealed the moment that inspired it on Twitter.

The singer described the song as "a friendship anthem", later posting the single's artwork on Instagram along with its release date, January 18.

== Composition and lyrics ==
"7 Rings" (2019)
A 17-second sample of "7 Rings", featuring Grande rapping the chorus and an interpolation of "My Favorite Things" from the musical The Sound of Music.

"7 Rings" is a pop, trap-pop, and R&B song with elements of hip hop that runs for 3 minutes, with Grande rapping the hook and final verse. It features a heavy bass and sees Grande discuss "how global success has allowed her to enjoy the finer things". Billboard magazine noted it's "the most hip-hop-leaning song Grande has released in the post-Sweetener era yet, with Grande almost rapping the song's verses".

The song channels the melody of The Sound of Music's "My Favorite Things" in the verses: "Breakfast at Tiffany's/And bottles of bubbles/Girls with tattoos who like getting in trouble/Lashes and diamonds, ATM machines/Buy myself all of my favorite things". The song also interpolates the Notorious B.I.G.'s "Gimme the Loot". Grande and her team agreed to sign away 90% of the track's songwriting royalties at the request of the Concord music company.

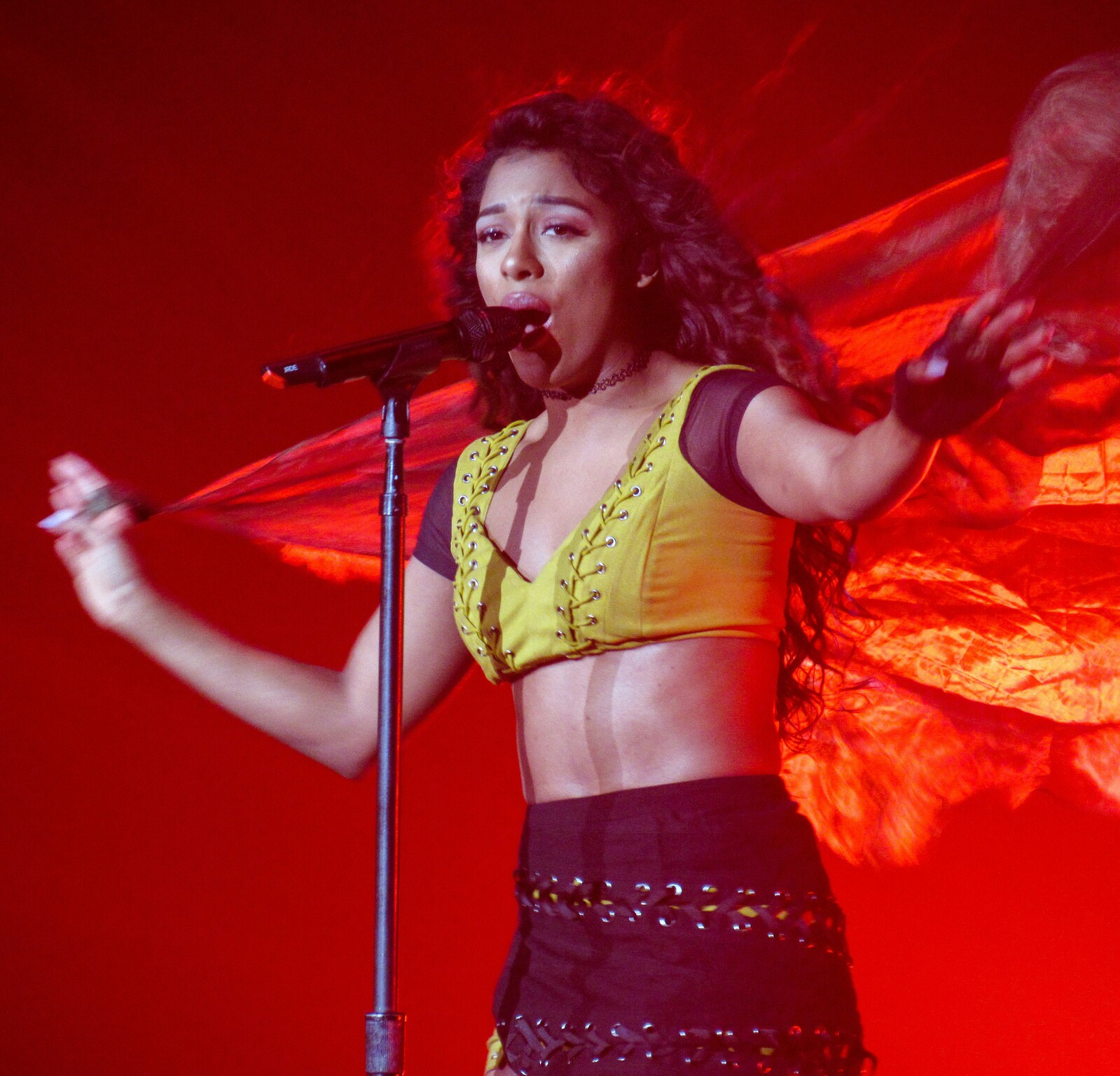
Victoria Monét (pictured in 2017) is a co-writer and co-vocal producer on "7 Rings".

Grande described the song as a "friendship anthem" that "evolves" from previous single "Thank U, Next" while embracing a new chapter. She opens up about how her breakup with Pete Davidson led her to "treating her friends instead".

The sheet music for "7 Rings" is in the key of C♯ minor in common time with a tempo of 140 beats per minute. The vocal line spans from G♯_{3} to C♯_{6}.

== Critical reception ==
The song was met with mixed-to-positive reviews. Rolling Stone's Brittany Spanos praised "7 Rings," calling it "dangerously fun, and as deliriously intoxicating as the champagne at Tiffany's with all your best bitches." Markos Papadatos from Digital Journal praised Grande's vocals as "smooth and crystalline with a retro vibe to it" and said she has shown "consistency with the radio singles that she has put out, and each song stands out from a sonic and lyrical standpoint. "7 rings" is no different." Jamieson Cox from Pitchfork was mixed in his review, saying the song is "a letdown given all of the hype. This is The Sound of Music's 'My Favorite Things' as flipped by Regina George, and its sneering tone is a far cry from Sweetener's benevolence." The Atlantic's editor, Spencer Kornhaber, criticized the song, writing:

The single is raising hackles because it regresses to a more cartoonish, and imitative, use of black music than she's done before (not to mention the video's evocation of Japanese kawaii). She's wearing the culture as a costume—or even as a joke—not unlike white frat guys putting on fake grills for a "ratchet" party.

The song was ranked 31 on Billboard's year-end best songs of 2019.

== Accolades ==
Accolades for "7 Rings"
Year	Organization	Award	Result
2019	Teen Choice Awards	Choice Song: Female Artist	Won
2019	MTV Video Music Awards	Best Editing	Nominated
2019	MTV Video Music Awards	Best Art Direction	Won
2019	MTV Video Music Awards	Best Power Anthem	Nominated
2019	People's Choice Awards	Song of the Year	Nominated
2019	People's Choice Awards	Music Video of the Year	Nominated
2019	MTV Europe Music Awards	Best Song	Nominated
2019	American Music Awards	Favorite Music Video	Nominated
2020	Grammy Awards	Record of the Year	Nominated
2020	Grammy Awards	Best Pop Solo Performance	Nominated
2020	iHeartRadio Music Awards	Best Lyrics	Nominated
2020	iHeartRadio Music Awards	Favorite Music Video Choreography	Nominated
2020	iHeartRadio Music Awards	Best Music Video	Nominated
2020	Myx Music Awards	Favorite International Video	Nominated

== Commercial performance ==
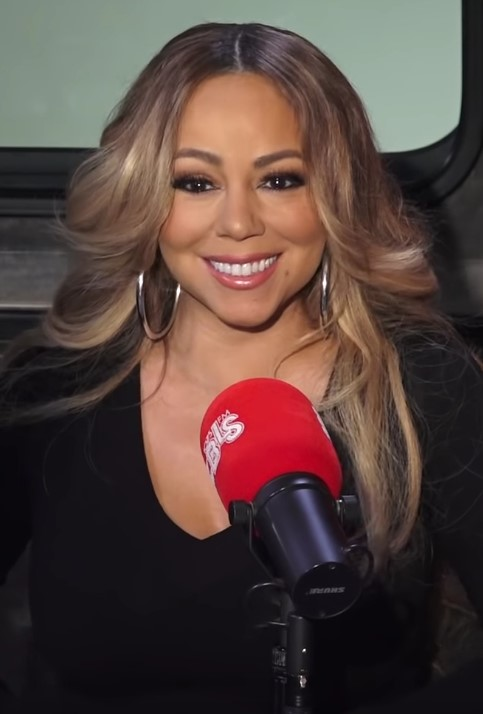
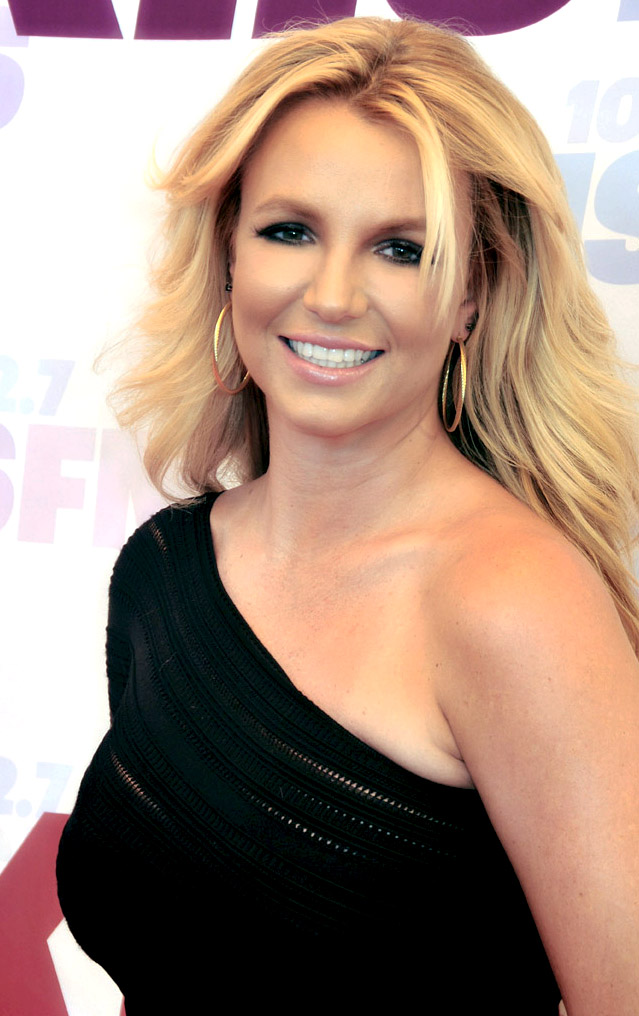
With "7 Rings", Grande joined Mariah Carey (3) and Britney Spears (2) as the only female artists to have two or more number-one debuts on the Billboard Hot 100. She passed Spears with the release of her 2020 single "Stuck with U", and subsequently passed Carey with the release of "Rain on Me" and "Positions".

"7 Rings" earned over 14.9 million plays in its first 24 hours on Spotify, breaking the platform's all-time counter record. However, only 8.5 million of these counted towards Spotify's Top 200 chart dated January 18, 2019. The song also broke the Spotify weekly record with over 70 million streams in its first week on the platform.

In the United States, "7 Rings" debuted at number one on the Billboard Hot 100 issue dated February 2, 2019, becoming Grande's second number-one single, following "Thank U, Next", and the 33rd song to do so. With this, Grande joined Carey (3) and Britney Spears (2) as the only female artists with multiple number-one debuts; and at the time she was overall the fifth artist after Justin Bieber and Drake. She later broke the overall record with the number one debuts of "Stuck with U" and "Rain on Me". Grande also became the first artist to have their first two number-ones debut at the top spot. Among component charts, "7 Rings" debuted at the top of the Streaming Songs chart with 85.3 million US streams in the week ending January 24, 2019, according to Nielsen Music; the sum marked the second-biggest streaming week ever for a song by a female artist (after the aforementioned "Thank U, Next"). It also debuted at number one on the Digital Songs chart with 96,000 downloads. As the second single to her fifth album Thank U, Next, Grande had two singles that debuted at number one on the chart, making Grande the third artist in history to have an album with two songs that debuted at number one on the Hot 100, after Drake's Scorpion in 2018 and Mariah Carey's Daydream in 1995. "7 Rings" held the top spot for a fourth week following the release of her album Thank U, Next, blocking her singles "Break Up with Your Girlfriend, I'm Bored" (which debuted at number two), and "Thank U, Next" (which rose up to number three). With three songs in the top 3, Grande became the first artist in history since The Beatles in 1964 to occupy the top 3 spots on the chart and the first and only solo artist to ever achieve this record. "7 Rings" remained atop the Hot 100 for eight non-consecutive weeks until it was unseated by "Old Town Road" by Lil Nas X and descended to number three on April 13, 2019. It remained in the top ten for its first 16 weeks until it fell to number 11 on May 25, 2019.

In the UK, "7 Rings" became Grande's fourth number one in the country. The single sold 126,000 units, becoming Grande's biggest opening week. It also set the record for the most streams of a song in a week with 16.9 million streams. On the issue dated 21 February 2019, "7 Rings" was replaced by "Break Up with Your Girlfriend, I'm Bored", making Grande the second female artist to occupy the top two positions on the UK Singles Chart and the first female artist to self-replace on the top of the chart. The song reclaimed the summit position the following week, pushing "Break Up with Your Girlfriend, I'm Bored" down to number two, and thus making Grande the first artist in the chart's history to self-replace for two consecutive weeks. As of March 2021, "7 Rings" is Grande's third most-streamed song in the United Kingdom and overall 18th most-streamed song by a female artist in the country.

In Australia, the song debuted at number one, becoming Grande's 3rd number one single.

== Music video ==
=== Background and reception ===
Grande shared a preview of the music video on January 14, 2019. The video itself premiered on January 18, 2019, on Grande's YouTube channel. The video features many of Grande's close friends, with whom a shopping trip inspired the song.

The music video was directed by Hannah Lux Davis, who also directed the music videos for Grande's previous singles, "Breathin" and "Thank U, Next".

Billboard magazine called the pink-colored video "sassy", as Grande and her friends flash their diamond rings at a luxurious party in a "mansion that's decked with diamonds, graffiti, and a champagne tower". Digital Journal gave it an A rating, calling it "distinct and remarkable. It is creative and artistic and it will resonate with her fans." The "7 Rings" music video earned 23.6 million views in its first 24 hours.

=== Synopsis ===
The video begins outside a house with many women posing on cars and caressing each other. Next, the title appears, reading out "7 Rings" (and written in Japanese as "七つの指輪"). The song then begins with Grande outside showing a far shot showing Grande and many other women, which then transitions to Grande in the kitchen with added pink LED lights around her. She is shown wearing jewelry around her neck and ears, and some on her hair. She also sports pink hair extensions. The scene then moves to a party that shows Grande and backup dancers dancing and drinking champagne. Afterwards, the next scene depicts Grande in front of a tower of champagne coupes. The scene after shows Grande pouring a champagne bottle over them and also shows Grande's real-life friends including Alexa Luria and singer/songwriter Victoria Monét (who also contributed songwriting to the track). The next scene then shows Grande laying down on the staircase with Rapunzel-inspired ponytail, also signifying her ex-boyfriend Pete Davidson's apartment. While also still showing scenes earlier in the video, a scene also shows Grande pouring a bottle over the champagne tower, which ends up falling down. The next scene involves a Barbie-inspired house showing Grande in a pink latex outfit (similar to Dangerous Woman). It then shows Grande ripping the wallpaper to peek inside. The final change is of Grande in a room with green lights giving resemblance to Wicked. The final scenes are of Grande outside with all her friends and backup dancers including her dog Toulouse.

== Controversies ==
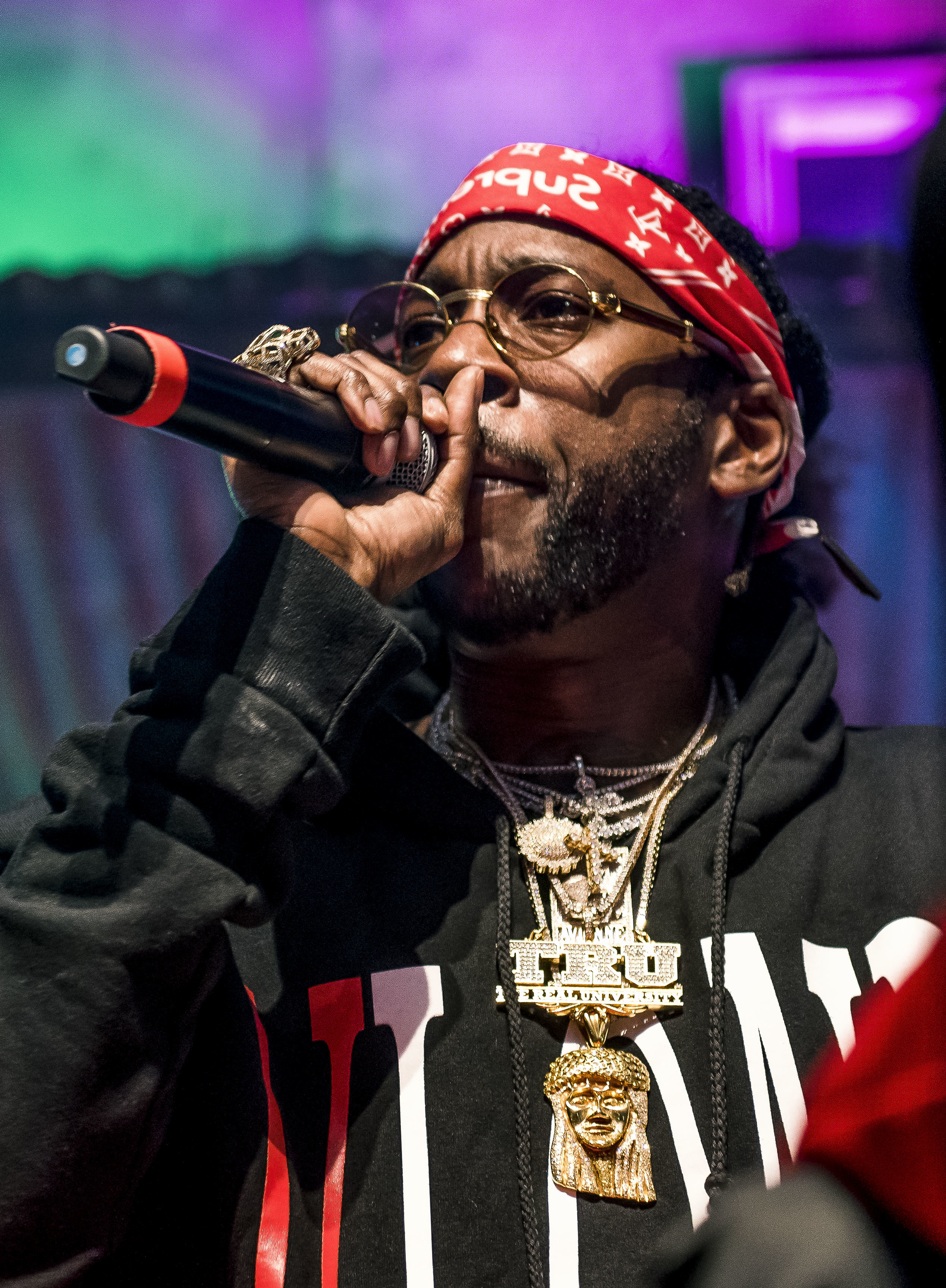
2 Chainz (pictured) featured on the official remix after meeting with Grande to discuss plagiarism accusations.

Grande was accused by American rapper Princess Nokia for plagiarism of her song "Mine". American rappers Soulja Boy and 2 Chainz also accused Grande of plagiarizing their respective songs "Pretty Boy Swag" and "Spend It", alongside the music video for the song featuring similar concepts to Chainz’ most recent album. However, after severe backlash from fans, Princess Nokia deleted the video accusing Grande around the same time the remix with 2 Chainz was released. Grande would later appear on the track "Rule the World" from 2 Chainz's fifth studio album Rap or Go to the League (2019).

Grande was subject to criticism and some ridicule after getting a tattoo commemorative of the song which read 「七輪」(Shichirin) in Japanese. While the kanji that comprise the word literally translate to "seven" and "ring" respectively, shichirin commonly refers to a specific type of small barbecue grill or brazier. A later attempt to fix the tattoo by the addition of the character yubi (指, lit. "Finger") beneath 「七」, to give 「七指輪」Shichi yubiwa (yubiwa meaning "ring", as in the piece of jewelry) only drew further criticism.

== Track listing ==
- Digital download
1. "7 Rings" – 2:58
- Digital download – Remix
1. "7 Rings (Remix)" featuring 2 Chainz – 2:58
- 7-inch vinyl – cassette
1. "7 Rings" (Explicit) – 2:58
2. "7 Rings" (Edited) – 2:58

== Credits and personnel ==
Credits adapted from Tidal and Thank U, Next's liner notes.

Recording

- Recorded at Jungle City Studios (New York City, New York) and The Record Plant (Hollywood, California)
- Mixed at MixStar Studios (Virginia Beach, Virginia)
- Mastered at Sterling Sound (New York City, New York)

Management

- Published by Universal Music Group Corp. (ASCAP), GrandAri Music (ASCAP), Victoria Monét Music Publishing (ASCAP), Taylor Monét Music/Warner Chappell (BMI), OWSLA (ASCAP) and District 1-12/Avex Music Publishing (ASCAP)
- Contains a sample from "My Favorite Things", written by Oscar Hammerstein II and Richard Rodgers, published by Williamson Music Co. (ASCAP)

Production

- Ariana Grande – vocals, songwriter, vocal producer
- Victoria Monét – backing vocals, songwriter, vocal producer
- Tayla Parx – backing vocals, songwriter
- Njomza Vitia – songwriter
- Kimberly Krysiuk – songwriter
- Tommy Brown – songwriter, producer, programming
- Michael Foster – songwriter, producer, programming
- Charles Anderson – songwriter, producer, programming
- Richard Rodgers – songwriter
- Oscar Hammerstein II – songwriter
- Billy Hickey – recording
- Brendan Morawski – recording
- Sean Klein – recording assistant
- Serban Ghenea – mixing
- John Hanes – mixing engineer
- Calabasas Sound – mastering
- 2 Chainz – featured artist(remix)
- Finis "KY" White – vocal mixing (remix)

== Charts ==
=== Weekly charts ===
Weekly chart performance
Chart (2019–2020)	Peak position
Argentina (Argentina Hot 100)	24
Australia (ARIA)	1
Austria (Ö3 Austria Top 40)	2
Belgium (Ultratop 50 Flanders)	4
Belgium (Ultratop 50 Wallonia)	6
Brazil Streaming (UBC)	10
Bolivia Airplay (Monitor Latino)	5
Canada Hot 100 (Billboard)	1
Canada CHR/Top 40 (Billboard)	1
Canada Hot AC (Billboard)	20
China Airplay/FL (Billboard)	5
CIS Airplay (TopHit)	1
Colombia Airplay (National-Report)	36
Croatia International Airplay (Top lista)	7
Costa Rica Airplay (Monitor Latino)	3
Czech Republic Airplay (ČNS IFPI)	49
Czech Republic Singles Digital (ČNS IFPI)	1
Denmark (Tracklisten)	2
Ecuador Airplay (National-Report)	23
Estonia (Eesti Tipp-40)	1
Euro Digital Song Sales (Billboard)	1
Finland (Suomen virallinen lista)	1
France (SNEP)	2
Germany (GfK)	4
Global 200 (Billboard)	126
Greece International Streaming (IFPI)	1
Guatemala Airplay (Monitor Latino)	4
Hungary (Single Top 40)	1
Hungary (Stream Top 40)	1
Iceland (Tónlistinn)	1
Ireland (IRMA)	1
Israel International Airplay (Media Forest)	1
Italy (FIMI)	5
Japan (Japan Hot 100)	21
Latvia Streaming (LAIPA)	1
Lebanon (Lebanese Top 20)	6
Lithuania (AGATA)	1
Luxembourg Digital (Billboard)	7
Malaysia Streaming (RIM)	1
Mexico (Billboard Mexican Airplay)	4
Netherlands (Dutch Top 40)	9
Netherlands (Mega Top 50)	8
Netherlands (Single Top 100)	4
New Zealand (Recorded Music NZ)	1
Norway (VG-lista)	1
Panama Airplay (Monitor Latino)	15
Portugal (AFP)	1
Puerto Rico Airplay (Monitor Latino)	6
Romania (Airplay 100)	5
Russia Airplay (TopHit)	5
Scottish Singles Sales (Official Charts)	1
Singapore (RIAS)	1
Slovakia Singles Digital (ČNS IFPI)	1
South Korea (Gaon)	26
Spain (Promusicae)	5
Sweden (Sverigetopplistan)	1
Switzerland (Schweizer Hitparade)	1
UK Singles (Official Charts)	1
US Billboard Hot 100	1
US Adult Pop Airplay (Billboard)	14
US Dance Club Songs (Billboard)	1
US Dance Airplay (Billboard)	4
US Pop Airplay (Billboard)	1
US Rhythmic Airplay (Billboard)	3
US Rolling Stone Top 100	32
Venezuela Airplay (National-Report)	3

Remix

Weekly chart performance
Chart (2019)	Peak position
New Zealand Hot Singles (RMNZ)	21

=== Monthly charts ===
Monthly chart performance
Chart (2019)	Peak position
Brazil Streaming (Pro-Música Brasil)	16

=== Year-end charts ===
2019 year-end chart performance for "7 Rings"
Chart (2019)	Position
Australia (ARIA)	10
Austria (Ö3 Austria Top 40)	40
Belgium (Ultratop Flanders)	39
Belgium (Ultratop Wallonia)	20
Bolivia (Monitor Latino)	30
Canada (Canadian Hot 100)	7
CIS (Tophit)	36
Denmark (Tracklisten)	24
Germany (Official German Charts)	41
El Salvador (Monitor Latino)	57
France (SNEP)	22
Hungary (Single Top 40)	30
Hungary (Stream Top 40)	16
Iceland (Tónlistinn)	16
Ireland (IRMA)	9
Italy (FIMI)	80
Japan Hot Overseas (Billboard)	12
Japan Streaming Songs (Billboard Japan)	95
Latvia (LAIPA)	7
Malaysia (RIM)	6
Netherlands (Dutch Top 40)	72
Netherlands (Mega Top 50)	38
Netherlands (Single Top 100)	44
New Zealand (Recorded Music NZ)	11
Norway (VG-lista)	22
Portugal (AFP)	11
Romania (Airplay 100)	33
Russia (Top All Media Hits, Tophit)	25
Russia (Top Radio Hits, Tophit)	25
South Korea (Gaon)	69
Spain (PROMUSICAE)	53
Sweden (Sverigetopplistan)	35
Switzerland (Schweizer Hitparade)	19
Tokyo (Tokio Hot 100)	14
UK Singles (OCC)	16
US Billboard Hot 100	7
US Adult Top 40 (Billboard)	48
US Dance Club Songs (Billboard)	33
US Dance/Mix Show Airplay (Billboard)	20
US Mainstream Top 40 (Billboard)	12
US Rhythmic (Billboard)	30
US Rolling Stone Top 100	4
Worldwide	5

=== Decade-end charts ===
Decade-end chart performance
Chart (2010–2019)	Position
US Billboard Hot 100	69

== Certifications and sales ==
Certifications and sales
Region	Certification	Certified units/sales
Australia (ARIA)	10× Platinum	700,000^{‡}
Austria (IFPI Austria)	2× Platinum	60,000^{‡}
Belgium (BRMA)	Platinum	40,000^{‡}
Brazil (Pro-Música Brasil)	6× Diamond	960,000^{‡}
Canada (Music Canada)	Diamond	800,000^{‡}
Denmark (IFPI Danmark)	2× Platinum	180,000^{‡}
France (SNEP)	Diamond	333,333^{‡}
Germany (BVMI)	Platinum	400,000^{‡}
Hungary (MAHASZ)	Platinum	4,000^{‡}
Italy (FIMI)	Platinum	50,000^{‡}
Mexico (AMPROFON)	2× Platinum+Gold	150,000^{‡}
New Zealand (RMNZ)	5× Platinum	150,000^{‡}
Norway (IFPI Norway)	3× Platinum	180,000^{‡}
Poland (ZPAV)	Diamond	250,000^{‡}
Portugal (AFP)	3× Platinum	30,000^{‡}
Spain (Promusicae)	2× Platinum	120,000^{‡}
Switzerland (IFPI Switzerland)	Platinum	20,000^{‡}
United Kingdom (BPI)	3× Platinum	1,800,000^{‡}
United States (RIAA)	Diamond	10,000,000^{‡}
Streaming
Japan (RIAJ)	Gold	50,000,000^{†}
Sweden (GLF)	3× Platinum	24,000,000^{†}
Summaries
Worldwide	—	13,300,000
^{‡} Sales+streaming figures based on certification alone.^{†} Streaming-only figures based on certification alone.

== Release history ==
Release history and formats for "7 Rings"
Region	Date	Format	Version	Label	Ref.
Various	January 18, 2019	Digital download; streaming	Original	Republic	
Australia	January 18, 2019	Contemporary hit radio	Original	Republic	
United States	January 22, 2019	Contemporary hit radio	Original	Republic	
United States	January 22, 2019	Hot adult contemporary radio	Original	Republic	
United States	January 22, 2019	Rhythmic contemporary radio	Original	Republic	
Italy	January 25, 2019	Contemporary hit radio	Original	Universal	
Various	February 1, 2019	Digital download; streaming	Remix featuring 2 Chainz	Republic	
Canada	March 8, 2019	Contemporary hit radio	Original	Republic	
Various	April 5, 2019	7" vinyl	Original; edited	Republic	
Various	April 12, 2019	Cassette tape	Original; edited	Republic	

== See also ==
- List of most-streamed songs on Spotify
- List of number-one singles of 2019 (Australia)
- List of Canadian Hot 100 number-one singles of 2019
- List of number-one singles of 2019 (Finland)
- List of number-one singles of the 2010s (Hungary)
- List of number-one singles of 2019 (Ireland)
- List of number-one songs of 2019 (Malaysia)
- List of number-one singles from the 2010s (New Zealand)
- List of number-one songs in Norway
- List of number-one singles of 2019 (Portugal)
- List of number-one songs of 2019 (Singapore)
- List of number-one singles of the 2010s (Sweden)
- List of number-one hits of 2019 (Switzerland)
- List of UK Singles Chart number ones of the 2010s
- List of Billboard Hot 100 number-one singles of 2019
- List of Billboard Hot 100 top 10 singles in 2019
- List of number-one digital songs of 2019 (U.S.)
- List of number-one Billboard Streaming Songs of 2019
