= Bad Guy (Billie Eilish song) =

2019 single by Billie Eilish

- Cassette single cover

Single by Billie Eilish

from the album When We All Fall Asleep, Where Do We Go?
- Released: March 29, 2019
- Recorded: 2018
- Genre: Dance-pop; electropop; pop-trap
- Length: 3:14
- Label: Darkroom; Interscope
- Songwriters: Billie Eilish; Finneas O'Connell
- Producer: Finneas O'Connell

Billie Eilish singles chronology
"Wish You Were Gay" (2019)	"Bad Guy" (2019)	"All the Good Girls Go to Hell" (2019)

Music video
- "Bad Guy" on YouTube

"Bad Guy" (stylized in all lowercase) is a song by American singer-songwriter Billie Eilish and the fifth single from her debut studio album, When We All Fall Asleep, Where Do We Go? (2019). It was released on March 29, 2019, by Darkroom and Interscope Records. The song was described by media as dance-pop, electropop, and pop-trap, with minimalist instrumentation. In the lyrics, Eilish taunts someone for being tough while suggesting that she is a more resilient bad guy than he is. Eilish wrote "Bad Guy" with its producer and her brother Finneas O'Connell. Different versions of the song include a collaboration with the Canadian singer Justin Bieber and a cover by Dove Cameron.

Upon release, "Bad Guy" received positive reviews and topped the US Billboard Hot 100 and 16 other international charts including Australia, Canada and New Zealand, while peaking at number two on the UK Singles Chart. In the US, it ended the record-breaking 19-week run of "Old Town Road" by Lil Nas X featuring Billy Ray Cyrus. "Bad Guy" has received several certifications, including a tenfold platinum award from the Australian Recording Industry Association (ARIA) and a Diamond certification from the Recording Industry Association of America (RIAA). "Bad Guy" is the tenth most streamed song in Apple Music history. The song received several awards, including Record and Song of the Year at the 62nd Annual Grammy Awards.

Dave Meyers directed the music video, which depicts Eilish involved in several activities such as wild dancing, suffering a nosebleed and sitting on the back of a man doing push-ups. Reviewers noted the video for its camp elements and eccentric imagery.

== Background and release ==
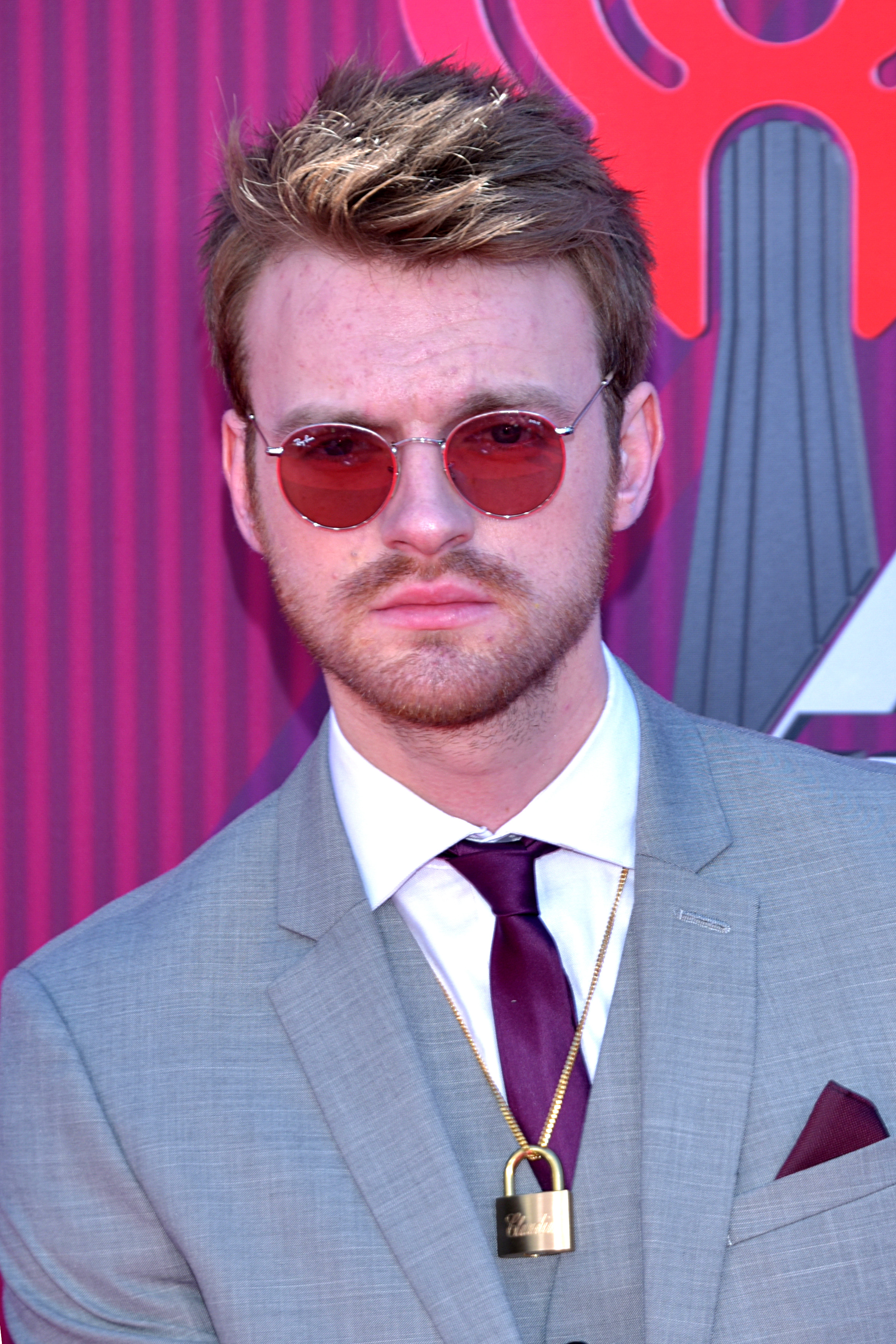
Eilish's brother Finneas O'Connell contributed to the song's writing and production.

Eilish released her first studio album, When We All Fall Asleep, Where Do We Go?, on March 29, 2019. "Bad Guy" was simultaneously issued as the record's fifth single. The song was co-written by Eilish and her brother Finneas O'Connell, with the latter also produced the track and Eilish providing additional production. It was mastered by John Greenham and mixed by Rob Kinelski, both of whom also served as studio personnel. In August 2019, the single was made available for pre-order on cassette and scheduled to ship in October; selected cassettes were signed by Eilish. Additionally, a flexi disc was similarly released for pre-order to ship in the following 4–6 weeks. Each of the two releases came with a digital single delivered via email for US customers.

== Composition and lyrical interpretation ==
"Bad Guy" is divided into two-halves; the first is fast at 135 beats per minute (BPM) and the latter is slower at 120 BPM. The song is played in the key of G minor following a chord progression of Gm–Cm–D^{7}, while Eilish's vocals span a range of F_{3} to C_{6}. The track was called dance-pop, electropop, pop-trap, and "nu-goth pop" in media articles; it features a minimalist production consisting of synth bass, a kick drum, amplified finger snaps and 808 bass. Furthermore, the single's hook uses a synthesizer riff, which has been described as both "goofy carnival" and "cartoony". In an interview with Rolling Stone, the use of a Sydney pedestrian traffic light sound in the song was revealed; it originates from a phone recording made by Eilish in February 2017. Eilish cited "Never" by JID and "Stuck In The Mud" by Isaiah Rashad as influences on the song's composition. Vanity Fair's Louie XIV labeled it "dance music through a fun house mirror". Alongside humorous cadences, Eilish uses several tongue-in-cheek lyrics. "Bad Guy" was inspired by Selena Gomez's "Everything Is Not What It Seems" (2007), the theme song for the teen sitcom Wizards of Waverly Place, alongside Laura Shigihara's video game music theme for Plants vs. Zombies (2009).

In the lyrics, Eilish taunts a lover for being a bad guy; as the song progresses she suggests she is tougher than him, singing in a "nonchalant, self-effacing murmur". According to reviewers, the song also discusses themes such as misandry, gloating, sarcasm and naughtiness. During the track's half-spoken chorus, the singer elaborates on her relationship with fellow men and women, rejecting their expectations of her; "I'm that bad type / Make your mama sad type / Make your girlfriend mad type / Might seduce your dad type / I'm the bad guy, duh". Other lyrics include: "My mommy likes to sing along with me / But she won't sing this song / If she reads all the lyrics / She'll pity the men I know". Analyzing the lyrics of "Bad Guy", Caitlin White of Uproxx wrote that they see "a woman's teenage voice boast of its power, assert her sexual dominance, and use men as playthings instead of sing about being used as one by them". She continued; "'Bad Guy' positions a young female pop star in a role that's usually reserved for men working in rock or hip hop". AJ Longabaugh of V likened the lyrics to the later work of Amy Winehouse.

== Critical reception ==
Upon its release, "Bad Guy" received mainly positive reviews, with several critics praising its lyrics. White of Uproxx likened the song to material released by the White Stripes, writing, "It's the kind of song that builds power as it unfolds, an anthem imbued with casual fearlessness". Labeling "Bad Guy" as a "low-key banger", Stereogum's Chris DeVille drew comparisons between the song and the work of Lorde and Fiona Apple. Writing for PopBuzz, Sam Prance said "Bad Guy" is "iconic" and dubbed the "duh" lyric as "already one of the standout musical moments of 2019". He continued; "It's the perfect anthem for anyone who likes to get in touch with their dark side". Vanity Fair's Louie XIV included the track in the magazine's list of "9 Songs From 2019 That Might Predict the Future of Pop", writing; "Billie has remade the look of pop success: ironic, self-aware, intimate, DIY, and paying little mind to dated standards for teen-pop idol-dom". Suzy Exposito of Rolling Stone said Eilish recalled DC Comics' character Harley Quinn during the song, "playing a comic book villain in a voice that suggests Lorde's rascal kid sister". In a negative review, Pitchfork's Stacey Anderson criticized Eilish for "bragging about statutory rape" and said she found the song "stale". Billboard included "Bad Guy" in their list of 100 songs that defined the 2010s.

Critics' year-end rankings of "Bad Guy"
Publication	List	Rank	Ref.
BBC	The 20 Best Songs of 2019	1	
Billboard	The 100 Best Songs of 2019	1	
Complex	The 50 Best Songs of 2019	10	
Consequence	The 50 Best Songs of 2019	2	
Entertainment Weekly	The 10 Best Songs of 2019	1	
NME	The 50 Best Songs of 2019	2	
Paste	The 50 Best Songs of 2019	9	
Pitchfork	The 100 Best Songs of 2019	10	
Rolling Stone	The 100 Best Songs of 2019	1	
Slant Magazine	The 50 Best Songs of 2019	7	
The Guardian	The 20 Best Songs of 2019	4	
The Ringer	The 10 Best Songs of 2019	2	
Uproxx	The Best Songs of 2019	1	
Vulture	The 10 Best Songs of 2019	5	

In 2021, it was listed at number 178 on Rolling Stone's Top 500 Greatest Songs of All Time list.

In 2025, "Bad Guy" was listed at number 18 on Rolling Stone's Top 250 Greatest Songs of the 21st Century so far.

Awards for "Bad Guy"
Year	Organization	Award	Result	Ref.
2019	American Music Awards	Favorite Music Video	Nominated	
2019	MTV Millennial Awards	Global Hit	Won	
2019	MTV Video Music Awards	Video of the Year	Nominated	
2019	MTV Video Music Awards	Best Pop Video	Nominated	
2019	MTV Video Music Awards	Best Direction	Nominated	
2019	MTV Video Music Awards	Best Editing	Won	
2019	MTV Video Music Awards	Song of the Summer	Nominated	
2019	LOS40 Music Awards	Best International Video	Nominated	
2019	Teen Choice Awards	Choice Song: Female Artist	Nominated	
2019	Q Awards	Best Track	Nominated	
2019	Rockbjörnen	Foreign Song of the Year	Nominated	
2019	BBC Radio 1's Teen Awards	Best Single	Nominated	
2019	MTV Europe Music Awards	Best Song	Won	
2019	MTV Europe Music Awards	Best Video	Nominated	
2019	MTV Millennial Awards	Global Hit	Won	
2019	MTV Video Music Awards Japan	Best New International Artist Video	Won	
2019	MTV Video Music Awards Japan	Video of the Year	Nominated	
2019	Melon Music Awards	Best Pop Song	Won	
2019	Melon Music Awards	Best Song	Nominated	
2019	NRJ Music Awards	Video of the Year	Nominated	
2019	Telehit Awards	Best Anglo Video	Won	
2019	Telehit Awards	Best Anglo Song	Won	
2019	Telehit Awards	People's Best Video	Nominated	
2019	People's Choice Awards	Song of 2019	Nominated	
2019	People's Choice Awards	Music Video of 2019	Nominated	
2020	ASCAP Pop Music Awards	Award Winning Songs	Won	
2020	GAFFA Awards (Denmark)	International Hit of the Year	Won	
2020	GAFFA Awards (Sweden)	International Hit of the Year	Won	
2020	Hit FM Music Awards	Top Ten Singles	Won	
2020	TEC Awards	Outstanding Creative Achievement – Record Production/Single or Track	Nominated	
2020	Grammy Awards	Record of the Year	Won	
2020	Grammy Awards	Song of the Year	Won	
2020	Grammy Awards	Best Pop Solo Performance	Nominated	
2020	iHeartRadio Music Awards	Song of the Year	Nominated	
2020	iHeartRadio Music Awards	Alternative Rock Song of the Year	Won	
2020	iHeartRadio Music Awards	Best Lyrics	Nominated	
2020	iHeartRadio Music Awards	Best Music Video	Nominated	
2020	NME Awards	Best Song in the World	Won	
2020	RTHK International Pop Poll Awards	Top Ten International Gold Songs	Won	
2020	RTHK International Pop Poll Awards	Super Gold Song	Won	
2020	Queerty Awards	Anthem	Nominated	

== Commercial performance ==
Upon the release of When We All Fall Asleep, Where Do We Go?, "Bad Guy" debuted at number seven on the US Billboard Hot 100 on the week ending April 13, 2019, as Eilish's first top ten entry on the chart. It later occupied number two for a total of nine weeks, before ultimately reaching number one on the week ending August 24, 2019. "Bad Guy" ended the record-breaking 19-week run of "Old Town Road" by Lil Nas X featuring Billy Ray Cyrus. At 17, she further became the first artist born in the 2000s to achieve this feat and the youngest since then-16-year-old Lorde topped the ranking with "Royals" in 2013. Internationally, "Bad Guy" reached number one in Australia, Canada, Estonia, Finland, Greece, Hungary, Iceland, Latvia, Lithuania, New Zealand, Norway, and Russia. The song has been awarded multiple certifications, including a tenfold platinum award from the Australian Recording Industry Association (ARIA) and a Diamond one from the Recording Industry Association of America (RIAA). becoming the first song from a female artist born this century to go Diamond in the US "Bad Guy" was the best-performing global single of 2019 with combined sales and track-equivalent streams of 19.5 million units according to the International Federation of the Phonographic Industry (IFPI). By 2022, "Bad Guy" was streamed over 2 billion times worldwide through Spotify, her first song to do so.

== Music videos ==
Eilish is seen sitting on the back of a man as he does push-ups at the end of the music video—alongside other eccentric imagery.

A music video for "Bad Guy" was directed by Dave Meyers and was uploaded to Eilish's official YouTube channel on March 29, 2019. Additionally, Eilish released a vertical video on August 15, 2019. The video begins with a yellow backdrop while the opening track "!!!!!!!" from When We All Fall Asleep, Where Do We Go? plays. Eilish discusses taking out her Invisalign dental brace before laughing. She eventually kicks her way through a wall while wearing a yellow sweatshirt and sweatpants, and hands her dental brace to a man, Eric Lutz, on her right. Scenes showing Eilish dancing wildly are interspersed with her feeding pigeons, getting a nosebleed while wearing a white outfit in a blue room with a clock, pouring milk and cereal into a suited man's mouth against the backdrop of a red desert, riding on a miniature car with a gang of men on tricycles, wearing snorkel gear while men's heads float in plastic bags above her, and sitting on a wall in front of a group of overweight men who flex their bellies to the beat. The video ends sinisterly with Billie in a dark, red room, sitting on the back of a man who does push-ups. One comment to the clip on YouTube posted by Seth Everman, reading "I'm the bald guy", became the most-liked on the platform, gathering over three million likes and also surpassed one billion views in November 2020, which made Google celebrate the milestone created an 'Infinite Bad Guy' interactive site that allowed users to switch between over 15,000 different covers of the song available on YouTube.

The video was positively received by music critics. James Rettig of Stereogum noticed elements of camp although he acknowledged the video was "still being emotionally sincere and vulnerable. This one features a lot of weirdo imagery ... in a way that's both goofy and genuinely unsettling". Chloe Gilke, writing for Uproxx, said the video takes several of the song's lyrics literally and that it is "awash in primary colors and black and white, Eilish's bold aesthetic". Rolling Stone's Jon Blistein noticed "a series of strange, grotesque and weirdly hilarious sequences", while Zoe Phillips of The Michigan Daily pointed out "strange dances, from a backward Exorcist-style crawl to a squatting sidestep to an energetic roll". Upon its release, the video was accused of "blatantly" plagiarizing photographs by Maurizio Cattelan and Pierpaolo Ferrari of Toiletpaper magazine. The video received significant attention online and was the subject of several memes. Melissa McCarthy parodied it on The Ellen DeGeneres Show in May 2019. On the January 16, 2020, episode of The Late Show with Stephen Colbert, the show parodied the song as "Bond Guy", which references No Time to Die, where Eilish would provide the theme for the movie.

== Live performances and other usage ==
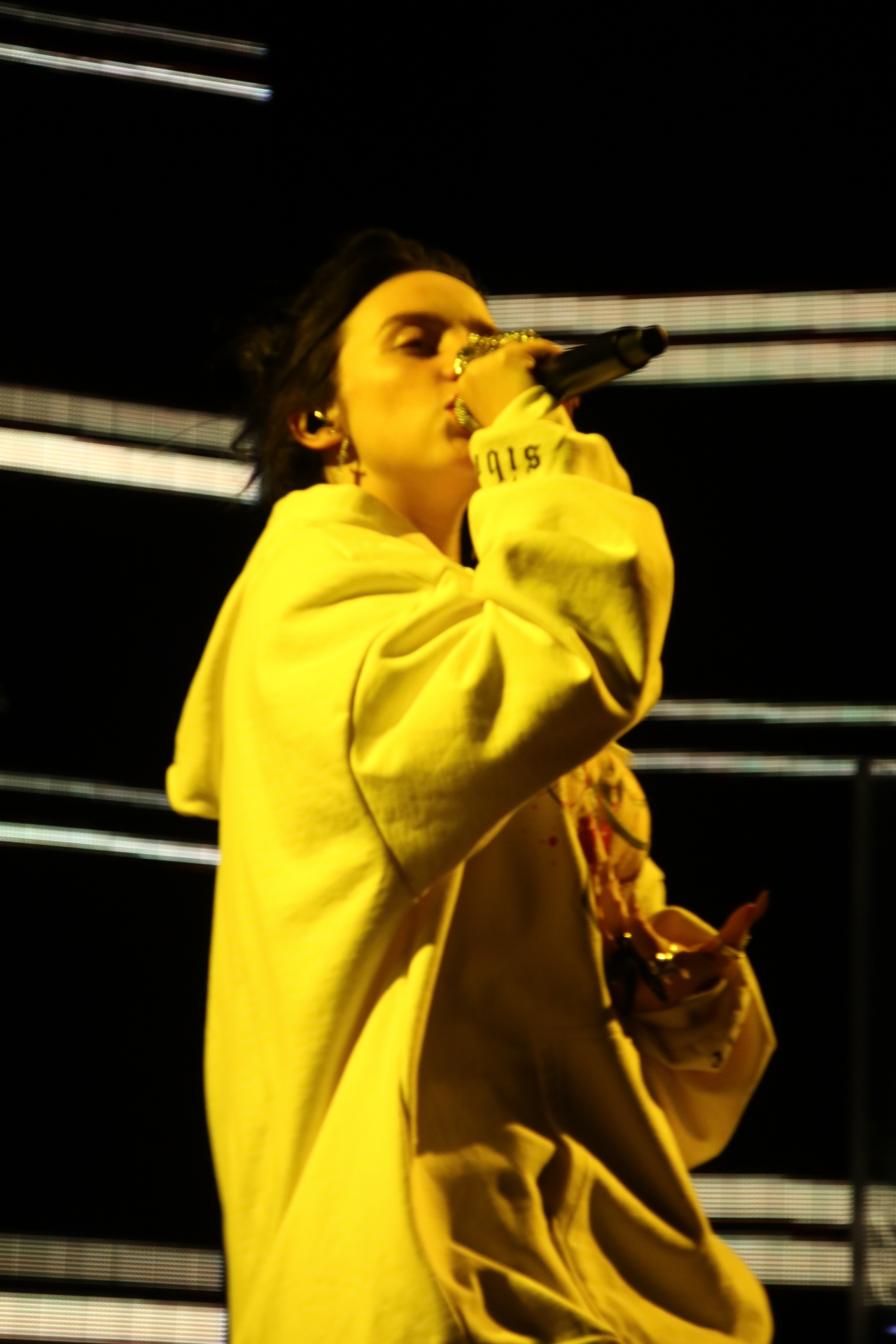
Eilish performing "Bad Guy" at the Red Rocks Amphitheatre during her When We All Fall Asleep Tour (2019)

Eilish has promoted "Bad Guy" through a number of live performances. On May 7, 2019, she sang it on Jimmy Kimmel Live!, and on May 26 on BBC Radio 1's Big Weekend. The singer also performed the track at Coachella Valley Music and Arts Festival on April 20, and at Glastonbury Festival on June 30. "Bad Guy" was included on the setlist of Eilish's When We All Fall Asleep Tour (2019). It was also performed at Pukkelpop in August of the same year. On September 29, 2019, Eilish performed the song on Saturday Night Live; her routine was compared to Lionel Richie's "Dancing on the Ceiling" (1986) music video. She further sang "Bad Guy" on her Where Do We Go? World Tour (2020), and Happier Than Ever, The World Tour (2022).

In June 2019, Bastille covered "Bad Guy" at BBC's Maida Vale Studios as part of a medley that also included Lady Gaga's "Bad Romance" (2009), Taylor Swift's "Bad Blood" (2015), Dick Dale's "Misirlou" (1962) and their own "Bad Decisions" (2019). For their reinterpretation, Bastille added guitars and backup singers, and changed the song's lyrical plot by modifying the original line "I'm the bad guy" to "You're the bad guy". The track was also covered by Two Door Cinema Club on Radio 1's Live Lounge the same month, by Alexandra Stan on Virgin Radio Romania in July, as well as by multiple musicians in December during a live radio broadcast of Live From Here at the Town Hall. A ska punk cover of the song was made by ska band the Interrupters and used in the second season of the Netflix original series The Umbrella Academy. In April 2019, Team Blake Shelton's Kendra Checketts covered "Bad Guy" on the Live Playoff round of the sixteenth season of The Voice. In May 2020, Anthrax drummer Charlie Benante and Suicidal Tendencies bassist Ra Diaz covered the song virtually during the COVID-19 lockdowns. Alessia Cara also covered the song on The Tonight Show Starring Jimmy Fallon as part of her Eilish impersonation.

"Bad Guy" was used for an advertisement for clothing manufacturer Calvin Klein's "My Truth" campaign, as well as commercials for Kia Seltos. It was included on the chart compilation album Now That's What I Call Music 103, and was used during the end credits of the 2019 superhero horror film Brightburn. It is also featured on the 2019 dance rhythm game, Just Dance 2020, and in the trailers for the 2019 film Bombshell, the 2020 video game Cyberpunk 2077, the 2022 animated movie The Bad Guys, and its 2025 sequel The Bad Guys 2. The song was further used in the 2021 movies Sing 2 and Back to the Outback. Among other parodies, one titled "Dad Guy" released by FunkTurkey on YouTube in August 2019, went viral. It replaces the original lyrics with jokes about fatherhood. A piano cover of "Bad Guy" by composer Ramin Djawadi was featured in the third episode of the fourth season of Westworld. The song also appeared in Fortnite in Fortnite Festival mode. In 2023, the song was used in the Disney+ original film Prom Pact. An instrumental version of the song was used in the 2024 Doctor Who episode "Rogue". In 2024, "Weird Al" Yankovic covered the chorus for the opening of his polka medley "Polkamania!".

== Justin Bieber remix ==
"Bad Guy"

Single by Billie Eilish and Justin Bieber
- Released: July 11, 2019
- Length: 3:14
- Label: Darkroom; Interscope
- Songwriters: Billie Eilish O'Connell; Justin Bieber; Finneas O'Connell; Jason Boyd
- Producer: Finneas O'Connell

Justin Bieber singles chronology
"Love Thru the Computer" (2019)	"Bad Guy" (2019)	"10,000 Hours" (2019)

=== Background and composition ===
On July 9, 2019, Eilish used her Instagram to dismiss rumours about a second studio album, hinting at the upcoming release of a secret project. Her brother Finneas O'Connell retweeted a tweet Justin Bieber had written the day before saying "Remix", leading to speculation. The remix version of "Bad Guy" was released on July 11, 2019, via Darkroom and Interscope Records. Prior to its premiere, the lyrics of the song were posted on Genius alongside its expected release date, labels and writers. Accompanying the release of the remix is cover artwork showing a photograph of a young Eilish—a fan of Bieber's—surrounded by his posters. Halle Kiefer of Vulture compared Eilish's look to that of JoJo Siwa.

The remix has identical credits to the original "Bad Guy" with the addition of Bieber and Jason Boyd as songwriters and composers. On the song, Bieber performs autotuned and rap-inspired vocals. His runs are added to the intro, following which he joins on the second verse, flaunting his "icy" wealth. He sings lyrics including: "I got more ice than, than the snow", "Cause I don't sleep, please don't wake me" and "It ain't political", adding the ad libitum "skrrt!". Bieber continues; "Yeah, I'm a bad guy/Ain't no holdin’ back guy/Come off like a mad guy/Always got your back guy/Yeah I'm the real type/Keep you full of thrills type/Show you what it feels like/Got an open invite", before chanting "I'm the bad guy". He growls into the second half of the song.

=== Reception and accolades ===
Music critics gave mixed reviews of the remix upon its release, mostly commenting on Bieber's appearance. Lake Schatz of Consequence of Sound wrote that Bieber's contribution failed to make a "huge" impact. Billboard's Andrew Unterberger wrote; "Bieber's clearly having fun with his guest verse and ad-libs – the remix's high point might come with his mid-verse "skrrt!" exclamation – but he never seems to totally find his way into the song's manic-spooky energy". Stereogum editor Chris DeVille considered Bieber's vocals "entirely out of place," concluding that "he basically ruins a great song." An editor of BreatheHeavy said the remix is "something no one asked for, but it'll certainly breathe new life into it". Callie Ahlgrim of Insider wrote; "Bieber takes some of the edge off of Eilish's brooding 'Bad Guy,' but not in a bad way. His sickly sweet voice glides over the thumping beat, creating an interesting and irresistible contrast". Jem Aswad of Variety likened the singer's vocal delivery to that of Justin Timberlake. The remix attained minor success on its own, but contributed to the original's rise to number one on the Billboard Hot 100. It received a nomination in the Best Remix category at the 2020 iHeartRadio Music Awards.

== Credits and personnel ==
Credits adapted from the liner notes of When We All Fall Asleep, Where Do We Go?, and Tidal.

- Billie Eilish – vocals, songwriting, additional production
- Finneas O'Connell – production, songwriting
- John Greenham – mastering engineering, studio personnel
- Rob Kinelski – mixing, studio personnel

Justin Bieber version additional personnel

- Justin Bieber – vocals, songwriting
- Jason Boyd – songwriting

== Charts ==
=== Weekly charts ===
Chart performance for "Bad Guy"
Chart (2019–2025)	Peak position
Argentina (Argentina Hot 100)	20
Australia (ARIA)	1
Austria (Ö3 Austria Top 40)	2
Belgium (Ultratop 50 Flanders)	3
Belgium (Ultratop 50 Wallonia)	3
Brazil (Top 100 Brasil)	84
Canada Hot 100 (Billboard)	1
Canada AC (Billboard)	40
Canada CHR/Top 40 (Billboard)	3
Canada Hot AC (Billboard)	18
China Airplay/FL (Billboard)	3
Croatia International Airplay (Top lista)	14
Colombia (National-Report)	22
CIS Airplay (TopHit)	1
Czech Republic Airplay (ČNS IFPI)	7
Czech Republic Singles Digital (ČNS IFPI)	1
Denmark (Tracklisten)	2
Ecuador (National-Report)	40
Estonia (Eesti Tipp-40)	1
Finland (Suomen virallinen lista)	1
France (SNEP)	5
Germany (GfK)	4
Global 200 (Billboard)	54
Greece International (IFPI)	1
Hong Kong (HKRIA)	5
Hungary (Dance Top 40)	1
Hungary (Rádiós Top 40)	1
Hungary (Single Top 40)	1
Hungary (Stream Top 40)	1
Iceland (Tónlistinn)	1
Ireland (IRMA)	2
Italy (FIMI)	2
Japan (Japan Hot 100)	7
Latvia (LaIPA)	1
Lithuania (AGATA)	1
Luxembourg Digital Songs (Billboard)	3
Malaysia (RIM)	2
Mexico (Billboard Mexican Airplay)	4
Moldova Airplay (TopHit)	48
Netherlands (Dutch Top 40)	9
Netherlands (Single Top 100)	5
New Zealand (Recorded Music NZ)	1
Norway (VG-lista)	1
Poland Airplay (ZPAV)	9
Portugal (AFP)	4
Romania (Airplay 100)	41
Russia Airplay (TopHit)	1
San Marino Airplay (SMRTV Top 50)	25
Scottish Singles Sales (Official Charts)	3
Singapore (RIAS)	5
Slovakia Airplay (ČNS IFPI)	55
Slovakia Singles Digital (ČNS IFPI)	1
South Korea (Gaon)	5
Spain (Promusicae)	17
Sweden (Sverigetopplistan)	2
Switzerland (Schweizer Hitparade)	2
UK Singles (Official Charts)	2
Ukraine Airplay (TopHit)	4
US Billboard Hot 100	1
US Adult Pop Airplay (Billboard)	6
US Dance Club Songs (Billboard)	23
US Dance Airplay (Billboard)	5
US Hot Rock & Alternative Songs (Billboard)	22
US Pop Airplay (Billboard)	1
US Rhythmic Airplay (Billboard)	38
US Rock & Alternative Airplay (Billboard)	2
US Rolling Stone Top 100	3

Chart performance for "Bad Guy" (Justin Bieber version)
Chart (2019)	Peak position
Bolivia (Monitor Latino)	11
Latvia (LAIPA)	13
Lithuania (AGATA)	6
Malaysia (RIM)	11
New Zealand (Recorded Music NZ)	5
Singapore (RIAS)	5
South Korea (Gaon)	200
Sweden (Sverigetopplistan)	25
Uruguay (Monitor Latino)	11
US Rolling Stone Top 100	11

=== Monthly charts ===
Monthly chart performance for "Bad Guy"
Chart (2019)	Peak position
Brazil Streaming (Pro-Música Brasil)	46
Paraguay (SGP)	53
Russia Airplay (Tophit)	1
South Korea (Gaon)	5
Ukraine Airplay (Tophit)	10

=== Year-end charts ===
2019 year-end chart performance for "Bad Guy"
Chart (2019)	Position
Australia (ARIA)	3
Austria (Ö3 Austria Top 40)	2
Belgium (Ultratop Flanders)	4
Belgium (Ultratop Wallonia)	6
Canada (Canadian Hot 100)	3
CIS (Tophit)	3
Denmark (Tracklisten)	5
France (SNEP)	19
Germany (Official German Charts)	6
Hungary (Dance Top 40)	28
Hungary (Rádiós Top 40)	29
Hungary (Single Top 40)	2
Hungary (Stream Top 40)	1
Iceland (Tónlistinn)	5
Ireland (IRMA)	3
Japan (Japan Hot 100)	71
Latvia (LAIPA)	1
Netherlands (Dutch Top 40)	58
Netherlands (Single Top 100)	13
New Zealand (Recorded Music NZ)	3
Norway (VG-lista)	5
Paraguay (SGP)	53
Poland (ZPAV)	61
Portugal (AFP)	4
Russia (Top All Media Hits, Tophit)	2
Russia (Top Radio Hits, Tophit)	2
South Korea (Gaon)	14
Sweden (Sverigetopplistan)	5
Switzerland (Schweizer Hitparade)	6
Tokyo (Tokio Hot 100)	5
UK Singles (OCC)	4
Ukraine Airplay (Tophit)	47
US Billboard Hot 100	4
US Adult Top 40 (Billboard)	23
US Dance/Mix Show Airplay (Billboard)	12
US Mainstream Top 40 (Billboard)	8
US Rock Airplay (Billboard)	13
US Rolling Stone Top 100	5
Worldwide (IFPI)	1

2019 year-end chart performance for "Bad Guy" (Justin Bieber version)
Chart (2019)	Position
Bolivia (Monitor Latino)	90
El Salvador (Monitor Latino)	61
Italy (FIMI)	13
Mexico (Monitor Latino)	56
Spain (PROMUSICAE)	23

2020 year-end chart performance for "Bad Guy"
Chart (2020)	Position
Argentina Airplay (Monitor Latino)	92
Australia (ARIA)	22
Austria (Ö3 Austria Top 40)	29
Belgium (Ultratop Flanders)	64
Belgium (Ultratop Wallonia)	71
Canada (Canadian Hot 100)	18
Denmark (Tracklisten)	37
France (SNEP)	52
Germany (Official German Charts)	40
Hungary (Dance Top 40)	4
Hungary (Rádiós Top 40)	12
Hungary (Single Top 40)	15
Hungary (Stream Top 40)	17
Iceland (Tónlistinn)	55
Ireland (IRMA)	34
Japan (Japan Hot 100)	24
Netherlands (Single Top 100)	92
New Zealand (Recorded Music NZ)	43
Portugal (AFP)	33
South Korea (Gaon)	37
Spain (PROMUSICAE) Justin Bieber remix	97
Sweden (Sverigetopplistan)	40
Switzerland (Schweizer Hitparade)	18
UK Singles (OCC)	26
US Billboard Hot 100	46
Worldwide (IFPI)	9

2021 year-end chart performance for "Bad Guy"
Chart (2021)	Position
Australia (ARIA)	92
France (SNEP)	111
Global 200 (Billboard)	58
Hungary (Dance Top 40)	21
Hungary (Rádiós Top 40)	71
Hungary (Single Top 40)	91
Portugal (AFP)	149
South Korea (Gaon)	165
Ukraine Airplay (Tophit)	190

2022 year-end chart performance for "Bad Guy"
Chart (2022)	Position
Global 200 (Billboard)	105
Ukraine Airplay (TopHit)	144

2025 year-end chart performance for "Bad Guy"
Chart (2025)	Position
Hungary (Rádiós Top 40)	80

=== Decade-end charts ===
Decade-end chart performance for "Bad Guy"
Chart (2010–2019)	Position
US Billboard Hot 100	61

== Certifications ==
Certifications and sales for "Bad Guy"
Region	Certification	Certified units/sales
Australia (ARIA)	18× Platinum	1,260,000^{‡}
Austria (IFPI Austria)	6× Platinum	180,000^{‡}
Belgium (BRMA)	4× Platinum	160,000^{‡}
Brazil (Pro-Música Brasil)	6× Diamond	960,000^{‡}
Canada (Music Canada)	Diamond	800,000^{‡}
Denmark (IFPI Danmark) Justin Bieber version	4× Platinum	360,000^{‡}
France (SNEP)	Diamond	333,333^{‡}
Germany (BVMI)	Diamond	1,000,000^{‡}
Italy (FIMI)	4× Platinum	280,000^{‡}
Japan (RIAJ)	Gold	100,000^{*}
Mexico (AMPROFON)	Diamond+3× Platinum	480,000^{‡}
New Zealand (RMNZ)	8× Platinum	240,000^{‡}
Norway (IFPI Norway)	4× Platinum	240,000^{‡}
Poland (ZPAV)	Diamond	100,000^{‡}
Portugal (AFP)	5× Platinum	50,000^{‡}
Portugal (AFP) Justin Bieber version	Gold	5,000^{‡}
South Korea (KMCA)	Platinum	2,500,000^{*}
Spain (Promusicae)	2× Platinum	80,000^{‡}
Spain (Promusicae) Justin Bieber version	4× Platinum	240,000^{‡}
United Kingdom (BPI)	5× Platinum	3,000,000^{‡}
United States (RIAA)	Diamond	10,000,000^{‡}
Streaming
Greece (IFPI Greece)	2× Platinum	4,000,000^{†}
Japan (RIAJ)	2× Platinum	200,000,000^{†}
South Korea (KMCA)	2× Platinum	200,000,000^{†}
Sweden (GLF)	4× Platinum	32,000,000^{†}
Summaries
Worldwide (IFPI)	—	19,500,000 (Note: Global year-end sales for "Bad Guy" in 2019.)
^{*} Sales figures based on certification alone.^{‡} Sales+streaming figures based on certification alone.^{†} Streaming-only figures based on certification alone.

== Release history ==
Release dates and formats for "Bad Guy"
Region	Date	Format(s)	Version	Label(s)	Ref.
Italy	March 29, 2019	Radio airplay	Original	Universal	
United States	April 23, 2019	Contemporary hit radio	Original	Darkroom; Interscope	
United States	April 29, 2019	AC radio; digital download; hot AC radio; modern AC radio	Original	Darkroom; Interscope	
United States	April 30, 2019	Alternative radio	Original	Darkroom; Interscope	
Various	July 11, 2019	Digital download; streaming	Remix with Justin Bieber	Darkroom; Interscope	
Italy	July 12, 2019	Radio airplay	Remix with Justin Bieber	Universal	
Various	August 2019	Cassette; digital download; flexi disc	Original	Darkroom; Interscope	

== See also ==
- List of best-selling singles in Australia
- List of number-one singles of 2019 (Australia)
- List of best-selling singles by country§Austria
- List of best-selling singles in Brazil
- List of Canadian Hot 100 number-one singles of 2019
- List of number-one singles of 2019 (Finland)
- List of best-selling singles in Germany
- List of number-one singles from the 2010s (New Zealand)
- List of number-one songs in Norway
- List of Billboard Hot 100 number-one singles of 2019
