= List of Billboard Hot 100 top-ten singles in 2019 =

This is a list of singles that charted in the top ten of the Billboard Hot 100, an all-genre singles chart, in 2019.

== Top-ten singles ==
Key

- ↑ – indicates single's top 10 entry was also its Hot 100 debut
- (#) – 2019 year-end top 10 single position and rank
- The "weeks in top ten" column reflects each song's entire chart life, not just its run during 2019.

List of Billboard Hot 100 top ten singles that peaked in 2019
Top ten entry date	Single	Artist(s)	Peak	Peak date	Weeks in top ten	Ref.
Singles from 2018
October 20	"Shallow"^{[C]}	Lady Gaga and Bradley Cooper	1	March 9	7	
October 20	"Happier" (#6)	Marshmello and Bastille	2	February 16	27	
November 3	"Sunflower" (#2)^{[J]}^{[Q]} ↑	Post Malone and Swae Lee	1	January 19	33	
November 10	"Without Me" (#3)	Halsey	1	January 12	29	
November 24	"High Hopes"	Panic! at the Disco	4	January 26	15	
Singles from 2019
January 19	"Eastside"^{[B]}	Benny Blanco, Halsey and Khalid	9	January 19	2	
January 26	"Wow" (#5)	Post Malone	2	April 6	24	
February 2	"7 Rings" (#7) ↑	Ariana Grande	1	February 2	16	
February 9	"Middle Child"^{[C]}^{[H]}	J. Cole	4	February 9	10	
February 23	"Break Up with Your Girlfriend, I'm Bored" ↑	Ariana Grande	2	February 23	2	
March 2	"Please Me"^{[D]} ↑	Cardi B and Bruno Mars	3	March 16	8	
March 9	"Thotiana"^{[F]}	Blueface	8	April 6	2	
March 16	"Sucker" (#10) ↑	Jonas Brothers	1	March 16	22	
April 13	"Old Town Road" (#1)^{[R]}	Lil Nas X featuring Billy Ray Cyrus^{1}	1	April 13	26	
April 13	"Bad Guy" (#4)^{[G]} ↑	Billie Eilish	1	August 24	30	
April 20	"Better"	Khalid	8	April 20	1	
April 27	"Dancing with a Stranger"^{[I]}	Sam Smith and Normani	7	April 27	8	
April 27	"Boy with Luv" ↑	BTS featuring Halsey	8	April 27	1	
May 4	"Talk" (#8)^{[I]}	Khalid	3	June 8	19	
May 11	"Me!"	Taylor Swift featuring Brendon Urie	2	May 11	4	
May 18	"If I Can't Have You"^{[L]}^{[N]} ↑	Shawn Mendes	2	May 18	4	
May 18	"Homicide" ↑	Logic featuring Eminem	5	May 18	1	
May 25	"I Don't Care" ↑	Ed Sheeran and Justin Bieber	2	May 25	17	
June 1	"Sweet but Psycho"	Ava Max	10	June 1	3	
June 8	"Suge"	DaBaby	7	July 6	7	
June 22	"No Guidance"^{[K]}^{[M]} ↑	Chris Brown featuring Drake	5	October 5	23	
June 29	"You Need to Calm Down"^{[O]} ↑	Taylor Swift	2	June 29	2	
June 29	"Money in the Grave" ↑	Drake featuring Rick Ross	7	June 29	2	
July 6	"Señorita" ↑	Shawn Mendes and Camila Cabello	1	August 31	23	
July 13	"Truth Hurts"	Lizzo	1	September 7	22	
July 20	"Goodbyes"^{[P]} ↑	Post Malone featuring Young Thug	3	July 20	12	
August 10	"Ransom"	Lil Tecca	4	September 14	13	
August 17	"Boyfriend" ↑	Ariana Grande and Social House	8	August 17	1	
September 7	"Lover"	Taylor Swift	10	September 7	1	
September 14	"Circles" ↑	Post Malone	1	November 30	39	
September 21	"Take What You Want" ↑	Post Malone featuring Ozzy Osbourne and Travis Scott	8	September 21	1	
September 21	"Someone You Loved"	Lewis Capaldi	1	November 2	27	
September 28	"Panini"	Lil Nas X	5	September 28	9	
October 19	"Highest in the Room" ↑	Travis Scott	1	October 19	4	
October 19	"10,000 Hours"^{[S]}^{[T]} ↑	Dan + Shay and Justin Bieber	4	October 19	14	
October 26	"Bandit"	Juice Wrld and YoungBoy Never Broke Again	10	October 26	1	
November 9	"Lose You to Love Me"	Selena Gomez	1	November 9	10	
November 9	"Good as Hell"	Lizzo	3	November 30	11	
November 9	"Follow God" ↑	Kanye West	7	November 9	1	
November 30	"Everything I Wanted"	Billie Eilish	8	November 30	8	
December 7	"Roxanne"	Arizona Zervas	4	December 28	18	
December 14	"Heartless"	The Weeknd	1	December 14	2	
December 28	"Futsal Shuffle 2020" ↑	Lil Uzi Vert	5	December 28	1	

=== 2018 peaks ===
List of Billboard Hot 100 top ten singles in 2019 that peaked in 2018
Top ten entry date	Single	Artist(s)	Peak	Peak date	Weeks in top ten	Ref.
May 12	"Better Now"^{[A]} ↑	Post Malone	3	October 6	19	
June 16	"Girls Like You"^{[A]}	Maroon 5 featuring Cardi B	1	September 29	33	
June 16	"Lucid Dreams"^{[V]}	Juice Wrld	2	October 6	26	
August 18	"Sicko Mode" (#9) ↑	Travis Scott	1	December 8	32	
October 20	"Drip Too Hard"^{[A]}	Lil Baby and Gunna	4	October 20	15	
October 27	"Zeze"^{[A]} ↑	Kodak Black featuring Travis Scott and Offset	2	October 27	13	
November 17	"Thank U, Next" ↑	Ariana Grande	1	November 17	17	
December 15	"Going Bad"^{[E]} ↑	Meek Mill featuring Drake	6	December 15	2	

=== 2020 peaks ===
List of Billboard Hot 100 top ten singles in 2019 that peaked in 2020
Top ten entry date	Single	Artist(s)	Peak	Peak date	Weeks in top ten	Ref.
November 16	"Memories"	Maroon 5	2	January 11	18	
December 21	"Dance Monkey"	Tones and I	4	February 29	11	

=== Holiday season ===
Holiday titles first making the Billboard Hot 100 top ten during the 2018–19 holiday season
Top ten entry date	Single	Artist(s)	Peak	Peak date	Weeks in top ten	Ref.
January 5, 2019	"Rockin' Around the Christmas Tree"^{[U]}	Brenda Lee	1	December 9, 2023	35	
January 5, 2019	"Jingle Bell Rock"^{[W]}	Bobby Helms	2	December 27, 2025	32	
January 5, 2019	"A Holly Jolly Christmas"^{[V]}	Burl Ives	4	January 4, 2020	26	

- "It's the Most Wonderful Time of the Year" by Andy Williams also made the top ten for the first time during the 2018–19 season (on December 29, 2018), but never made a top ten appearance on any Hot 100 chart dated in 2019.

Recurring holiday title, appearing in the Billboard Hot 100 top ten in previous holiday seasons
Top ten entry date	Single	Artist(s)	Peak	Peak date	Weeks in top ten	Ref.
December 30, 2017	"All I Want for Christmas Is You"^{[U]}	Mariah Carey	1	December 21, 2019	43	

== Notes ==
^{1} Billy Ray Cyrus started being credited as a featured artist from the week ending April 20, 2019.

^{A} The single re-entered the top ten on the week ending January 12, 2019.
^{B} The single re-entered the top ten on the week ending February 23, 2019.
^{C} The single re-entered the top ten on the week ending March 9, 2019.
^{D} The single re-entered the top ten on the week ending March 16, 2019.
^{E} The single re-entered the top ten on the week ending March 30, 2019.
^{F} The single re-entered the top ten on the week ending April 6, 2019.
^{G} The single re-entered the top ten on the week ending April 27, 2019.
^{H} The single re-entered the top ten on the week ending May 4, 2019.
^{I} The single re-entered the top ten on the week ending May 25, 2019.
^{J} The single re-entered the top ten on the week ending July 13, 2019.
^{K} The single re-entered the top ten on the week ending July 27, 2019.
^{L} The single re-entered the top ten on the week ending August 3, 2019.
^{M} The single re-entered the top ten on the week ending August 10, 2019.
^{N} The single re-entered the top ten on the week ending August 24, 2019.
^{O} The single re-entered the top ten on the week ending September 7, 2019.
^{P} The single re-entered the top ten on the week ending September 14, 2019.
^{Q} The single re-entered the top ten on the week ending September 21, 2019.
^{R} The single re-entered the top ten on the week ending September 28, 2019.
^{S} The single re-entered the top ten on the week ending November 2, 2019.
^{T} The single re-entered the top ten on the week ending November 16, 2019.
^{U} The single re-entered the top ten on the week ending December 14, 2019.
^{V} The single re-entered the top ten on the week ending December 21, 2019.
^{W} The single re-entered the top ten on the week ending December 28, 2019.

== Artists with most top-ten songs ==
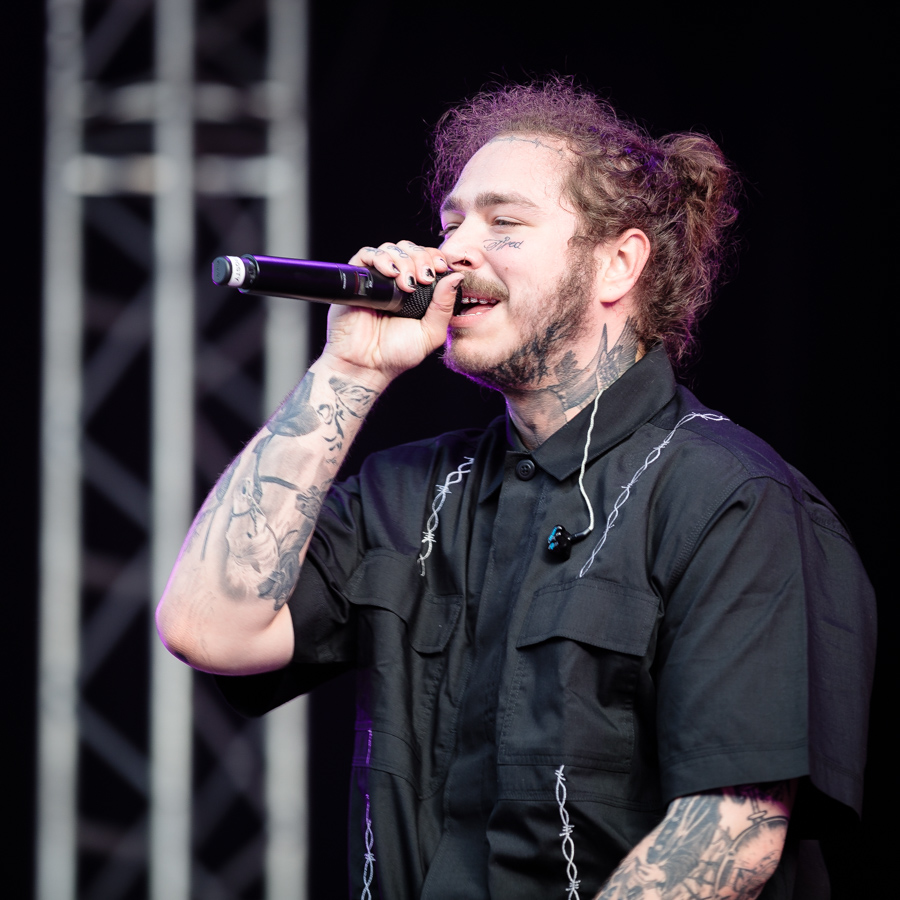
Post Malone (pictured) scored the most top 10 hits in 2019 with six. Five of which are from his third studio album Hollywood's Bleeding.

List of artists by total songs peaking in the top-ten
Artist	Numbers of songs
Post Malone	6
Ariana Grande	4
Travis Scott	4
Drake	3
Halsey	3
Khalid	3
Taylor Swift	3
Billie Eilish	2
Cardi B	2
Juice Wrld	2
Justin Bieber	2
Lil Nas X	2
Lizzo	2
Maroon 5	2
Shawn Mendes	2

== See also ==
- 2019 in American music
- List of Billboard Hot 100 number ones of 2019
- List of number-one streaming songs of 2019
- Billboard Year-End Hot 100 singles of 2019
