= List of Billboard Digital Song Sales number ones of 2019 =

2019 highest-selling digital singles in the United States

The Billboard Digital Song Sales chart is a chart that ranks the most downloaded songs in the United States. Its data is compiled by Nielsen SoundScan based on each song's weekly digital sales, which combines sales of different versions of a song by an act for a summarized figure.

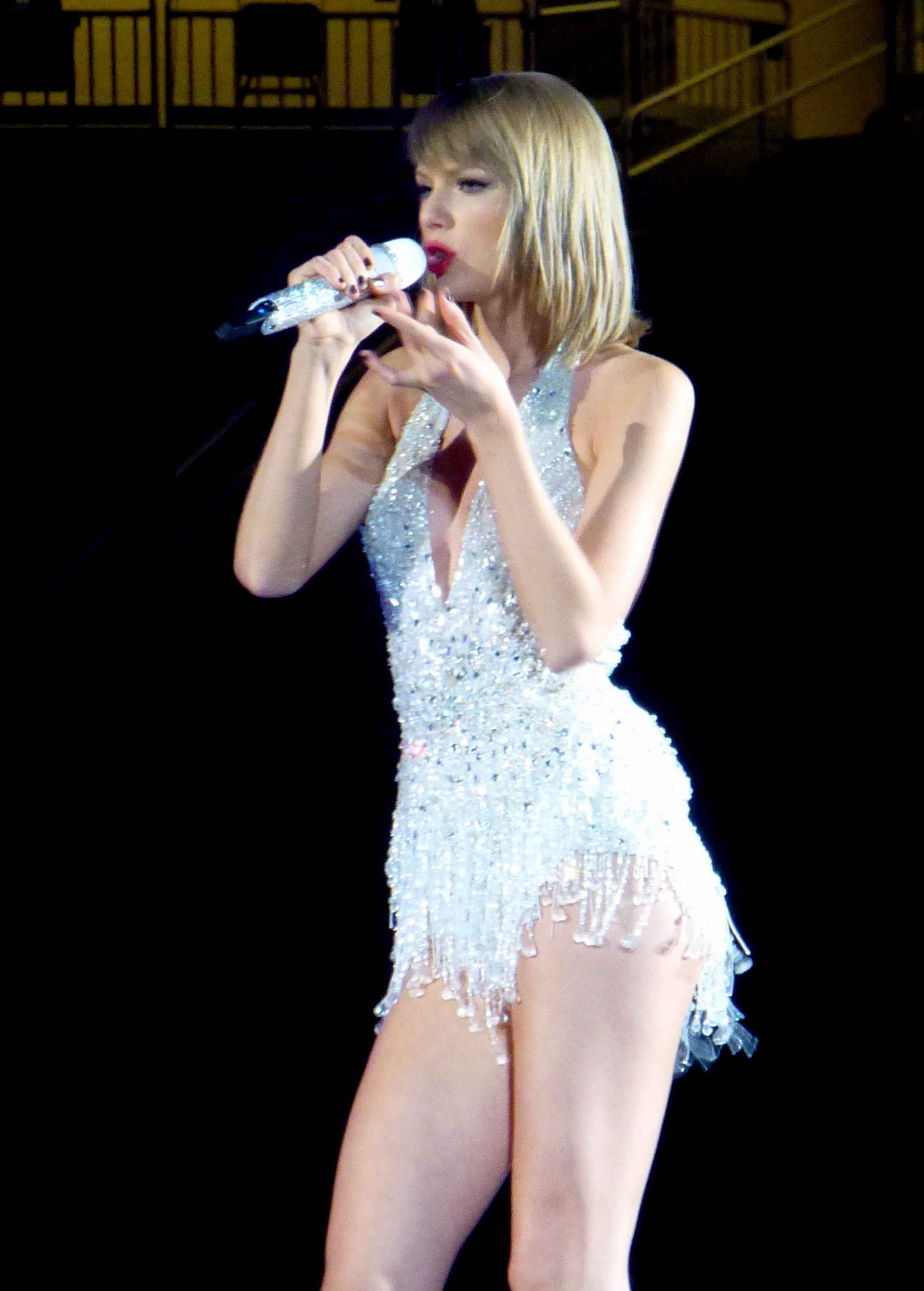
Singer-songwriter Taylor Swift (pictured) earned her record extending 16th, 17th and 18th digital songs number one with "Me!", which opened with over 190,000 downloads, the highest of the year, "You Need to Calm Down" and "Lover".

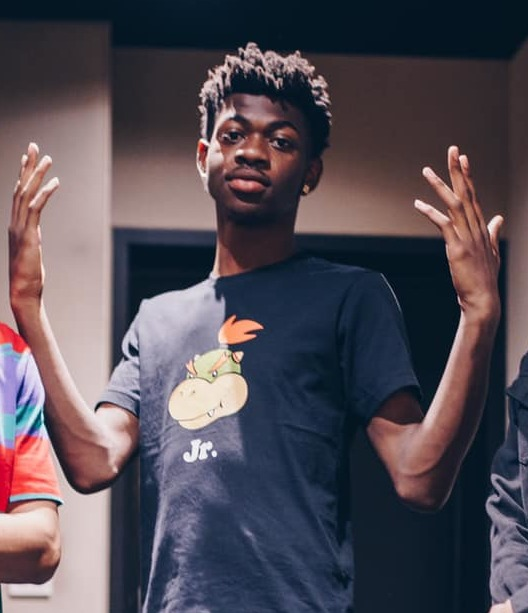
Rapper Lil Nas X, (pictured) earned his first digital song number one with "Old Town Road". The song has spent sixteen non-consecutive weeks at number one.

== Chart history ==
Key
†	Indicates best-charting digital song of 2019

Issue date	Song	Artist(s)	Weekly sales	Ref(s)
January 5	"Without Me"	Halsey	47,000	
January 12	"Sunflower"	Post Malone and Swae Lee	40,000	
January 19	"Sunflower"	Post Malone and Swae Lee	48,000	
January 26	"Sunflower"	Post Malone and Swae Lee	41,000	
February 2	"7 Rings"	Ariana Grande	96,000	
February 9	"7 Rings"	Ariana Grande	39,000	
February 16	"7 Rings"	Ariana Grande	42,000	
February 23	"Shallow”	Lady Gaga and Bradley Cooper		
March 2	"Please Me"	Cardi B and Bruno Mars	51,000	
March 9	"Shallow"	Lady Gaga and Bradley Cooper	115,000	
March 16	"Sucker"	Jonas Brothers	88,000	
March 23	"Shallow"	Lady Gaga and Bradley Cooper	34,000	
March 30	"Shallow"	Lady Gaga and Bradley Cooper	32,000	
April 6	"Shallow"	Lady Gaga and Bradley Cooper	28,000	
April 13	"God's Country"	Blake Shelton	32,000	
April 20	"Old Town Road" †	Lil Nas X featuring Billy Ray Cyrus	124,000	
April 27	"Old Town Road" †	Lil Nas X featuring Billy Ray Cyrus	91,000	
May 4	"Old Town Road" †	Lil Nas X featuring Billy Ray Cyrus	89,000	
May 11	"Me!"	Taylor Swift featuring Brendon Urie	193,000	
May 18	"Old Town Road" †	Lil Nas X featuring Billy Ray Cyrus	78,000	
May 25	"I Don't Care"	Ed Sheeran and Justin Bieber	77,000	
June 1	"Old Town Road" †	Lil Nas X featuring Billy Ray Cyrus	76,000	
June 8	"Old Town Road" †	Lil Nas X featuring Billy Ray Cyrus	81,000	
June 15	"Old Town Road" †	Lil Nas X featuring Billy Ray Cyrus	87,000	
June 22	"Old Town Road" †	Lil Nas X featuring Billy Ray Cyrus	71,000	
June 29	"You Need to Calm Down"	Taylor Swift	79,000	
July 6	"Old Town Road" †	Lil Nas X featuring Billy Ray Cyrus	59,000	
July 13	"Old Town Road" †	Lil Nas X featuring Billy Ray Cyrus	57,000	
July 20	"Old Town Road" †	Lil Nas X featuring Billy Ray Cyrus	43,000	
July 27	"Old Town Road" †	Lil Nas X featuring Billy Ray Cyrus	45,000	
August 3	"Old Town Road" †	Lil Nas X featuring Billy Ray Cyrus	46,000	
August 10	"Old Town Road" †	Lil Nas X featuring Billy Ray Cyrus	47,000	
August 17	"Old Town Road" †	Lil Nas X featuring Billy Ray Cyrus	34,000	
August 24	"Old Town Road" †	Lil Nas X featuring Billy Ray Cyrus	26,000	
August 31	"Lover"	Taylor Swift	35,000	
September 7	"Truth Hurts"	Lizzo	53,000	
September 14	"Truth Hurts"	Lizzo	38,000	
September 21	"Truth Hurts"	Lizzo	31,000	
September 28	"Truth Hurts"	Lizzo	27,000	
October 5	"Memories"	Maroon 5	27,000	
October 12	"Truth Hurts"	Lizzo	30,000	
October 19	"10,000 Hours"	Dan + Shay and Justin Bieber	53,000	
October 26	"Memories"	Maroon 5	21,000	
November 2	"Lose You to Love Me"	Selena Gomez	36,000	
November 9	"Lose You to Love Me"	Selena Gomez	39,000	
November 16	"For My Daughter"	Kane Brown	20,000	
November 23	"Lover"	Taylor Swift	20,000	
November 30	"Lover"	Taylor Swift	20,000	
December 7	"Circles"	Post Malone	20,000	
December 14	"Heartless"	The Weeknd	58,000	
December 21	"All I Want for Christmas Is You"	Mariah Carey	27,000	
December 28	"Nobody but You"	Blake Shelton and Gwen Stefani	30,000	

== See also ==
- 2019 in American music
- List of Billboard Hot 100 number-one singles of 2019
- List of number-one Billboard Streaming Songs of 2019
