= Without Me (Halsey song) =

2018 single by Halsey

Single by Halsey

from the album Manic
- Released: October 4, 2018
- Recorded: 2018
- Studio: Gama Studio (São Paulo, Brazil)
- Genre: Club-pop; electro-R&B
- Length: 3:21
- Label: Capitol
- Songwriters: Ashley Frangipane; Brittany Amaradio; Amy Allen; Louis Bell; Justin Timberlake; Kyle Burns; Timothy Mosley; Scott Storch
- Producer: Louis Bell

Halsey singles chronology
"Eastside" (2018)	"Without Me" (2018)	"11 Minutes" (2019)

Music video
- "Without Me" on YouTube

"Without Me" is a song by American singer Halsey, released on October 4, 2018. Halsey wrote the song with Brittany Amaradio, Amy Allen, and Louis Bell, while production was handled by Bell. It interpolates Justin Timberlake's "Cry Me a River" and as such Timberlake, Timbaland and Scott Storch are credited as co-writers. It was released through Capitol Records as the lead single from Halsey's third studio album, Manic.

"Without Me" reached number one on the Billboard Hot 100, becoming Halsey's first number-one single as a lead artist, and her second overall, following her feature on the Chainsmokers' song "Closer" in 2016. Like "Closer", it spent 52 weeks on the chart. The song also reached number one in Greece and the top three of ten other countries, namely Australia, Canada, Hungary, Malaysia, Portugal, Slovakia, Ireland, New Zealand, Singapore, and the United Kingdom. It also reached the top five in the Czech Republic, Denmark, Estonia, Latvia, and Norway. Its music video, directed by Colin Tilley, was released on October 29, 2018. The track is certified Platinum or higher in eleven countries including 8× Platinum in Australia and 9× Platinum in Canada, Diamond in the US, and Double Diamond in Mexico. The single was the number-one song of 2019 on pop radio in the US, the tenth biggest song overall of 2019 in the world, and the twelfth biggest song overall of the 2010s decade in the US.

Halsey performed "Without Me" live on a number of high-profile occasions; she performed it on The Voice, The Ellen DeGeneres Show, Saturday Night Live, at the 2018 MTV Europe Music Awards, at the 2018 Victoria's Secret Fashion Show, at the 2019 iHeartRadio Music Awards, at the 2019 MTV Millennial Awards, and at the 2019 Billboard Music Awards.

== Background and composition ==
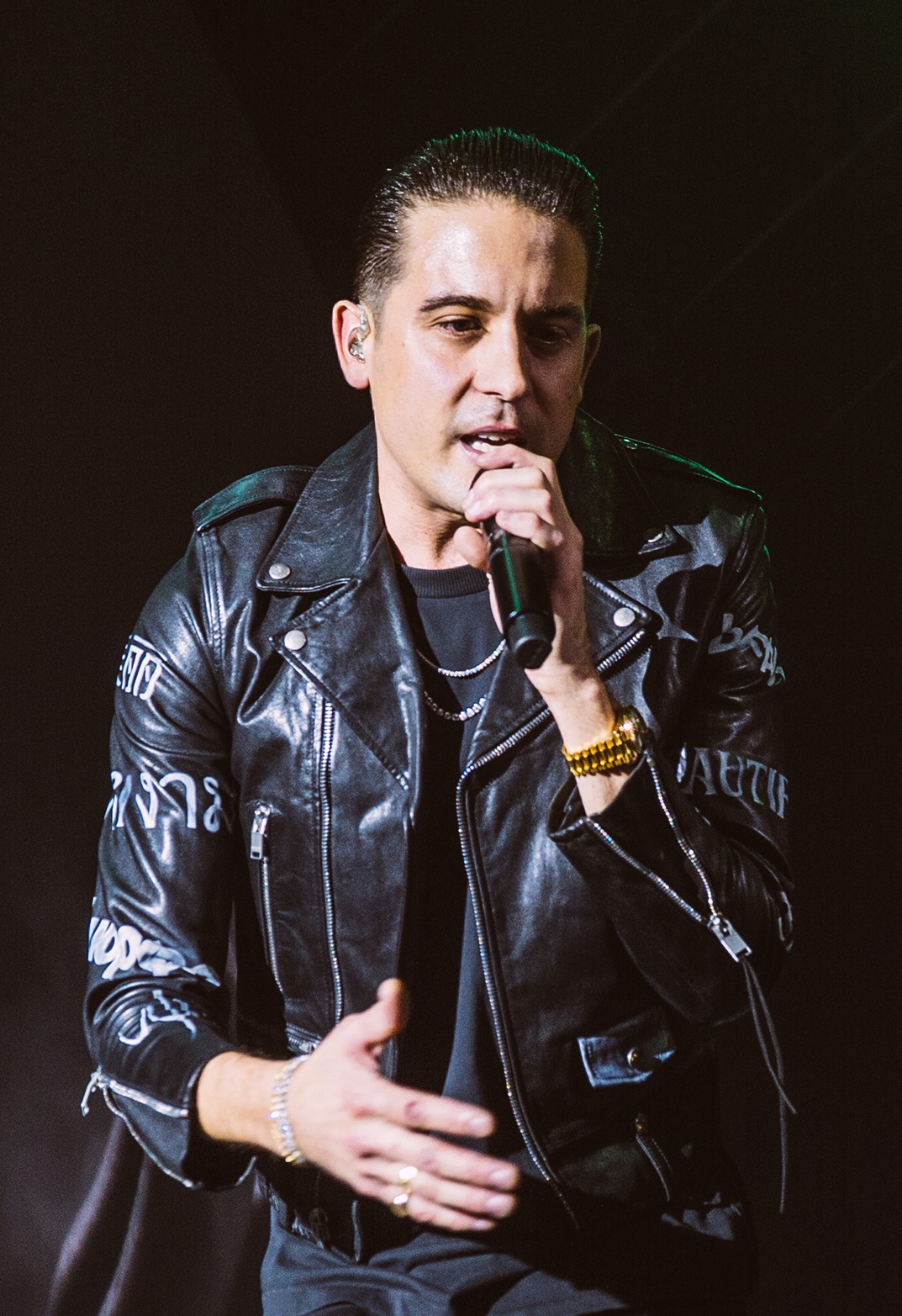
"Without Me" is partially about Halsey's ex-boyfriend, American rapper G-Eazy.

During a performance in London on September 23, 2018, Halsey teased visuals for "Without Me" before announcing it would be released on October 4. The song premiered on Zane Lowe's World Record radio show on Beats 1, and was followed by an interview about the song. It is her first solo song since her 2017 album, Hopeless Fountain Kingdom.

"Without Me" was written by Halsey with Delacey, Edei, and Amy Allen; while its production was done by Bell. It is a mid-tempo trap-influenced pop, R&B, electro-R&B, and club-pop break-up song, which comprises an atmospheric blend of synths and electropop beats in its production. The song's bridge contains an interpolation of the pre-chorus of Justin Timberlake's "Cry Me a River".

Online commentators speculated the song and music video are about Halsey's ex-boyfriend, G-Eazy, as they had split not long before the release of the music video. Halsey disputed these rumors after posting the reasoning behind the song on Instagram, explaining that the song is about several different relationships that she has either experienced or observed, and that the song is a reminder that "you shouldn't allow others to take advantage of you". However, in a January 2019 interview with Glamour, Halsey confirmed that the song is partially about him.

== Chart performance ==
"Without Me" debuted at number 18 on the Billboard Hot 100, on the issue dated October 20, 2018. With the debut of the music video, the song rose to number 12 on the issue dated November 3. The following week the song hit number 9, and on November 17, it reached number six. The following week, "Without Me" peaked at number 4, giving Halsey her first top-five single since "Bad at Love" reached number five in January 2018. On the issue dated January 12, 2019, "Without Me" reached number one, becoming Halsey's first number-one song on the Hot 100 as a lead artist, and her second overall, after her feature on "Closer" with the Chainsmokers in 2016. It fell to the runner up spot the following week but regained the top spot on January 26, 2019. It again slipped to number two on February 2, 2019, as Ariana Grande's "7 Rings" entered at the top of the chart. Additionally, Justin Timberlake and Timbaland scored their sixth and eighth Hot 100 chart-topper as songwriters, respectively.

The song spent 29 weeks in the top ten of the Hot 100 and logged its 52nd (and final) week, one full year, on the chart on the issue dated October 12, 2019. It was also the number-one selling song in the US for six weeks on the Digital Songs chart. In the UK the song peaked at number three, making it her third top five hit. Due to "Without Me" becoming number one, Halsey became the eighth woman to achieve multiple number ones on the Billboard Hot 100 during the 2010s. Billboard's Jason Lipshutz stated, "there's no cheat code that 'Without Me' used to get to the top of the Hot 100 – it's just a really polished, successful pop single, the type that Halsey has been tossing out more and more frequently." In February 2019, Halsey's song "Eastside" replaced "Without Me" as number one on the Mainstream Top 40. It made Halsey the first artist since 2014 to replace themselves as No. 1 on the chart, and it also made "Eastside" the longest journey to No. 1 in the charts history. "Without Me" also became Halsey's third number one on Billboard's Dance/Mix Show Airplay Chart in its March 9, 2019, issue.

== Music videos ==
A vertical video for the song was released on Spotify on October 12, 2018, and posted on YouTube on January 9, 2019.

The music video was directed by Colin Tilley and released on October 29, 2018. It features Halsey and a love interest go through the cycles of a toxic relationship. The singer said in a post to her Instagram, "The story is a reflection of a combination of relationships I've been in, or watched the people I love go through". She went on to say that, with the video, she is aiming to reassure people that it is not okay to be taken advantage of. The video features product placement by Beats and YSL.

== Live performances ==
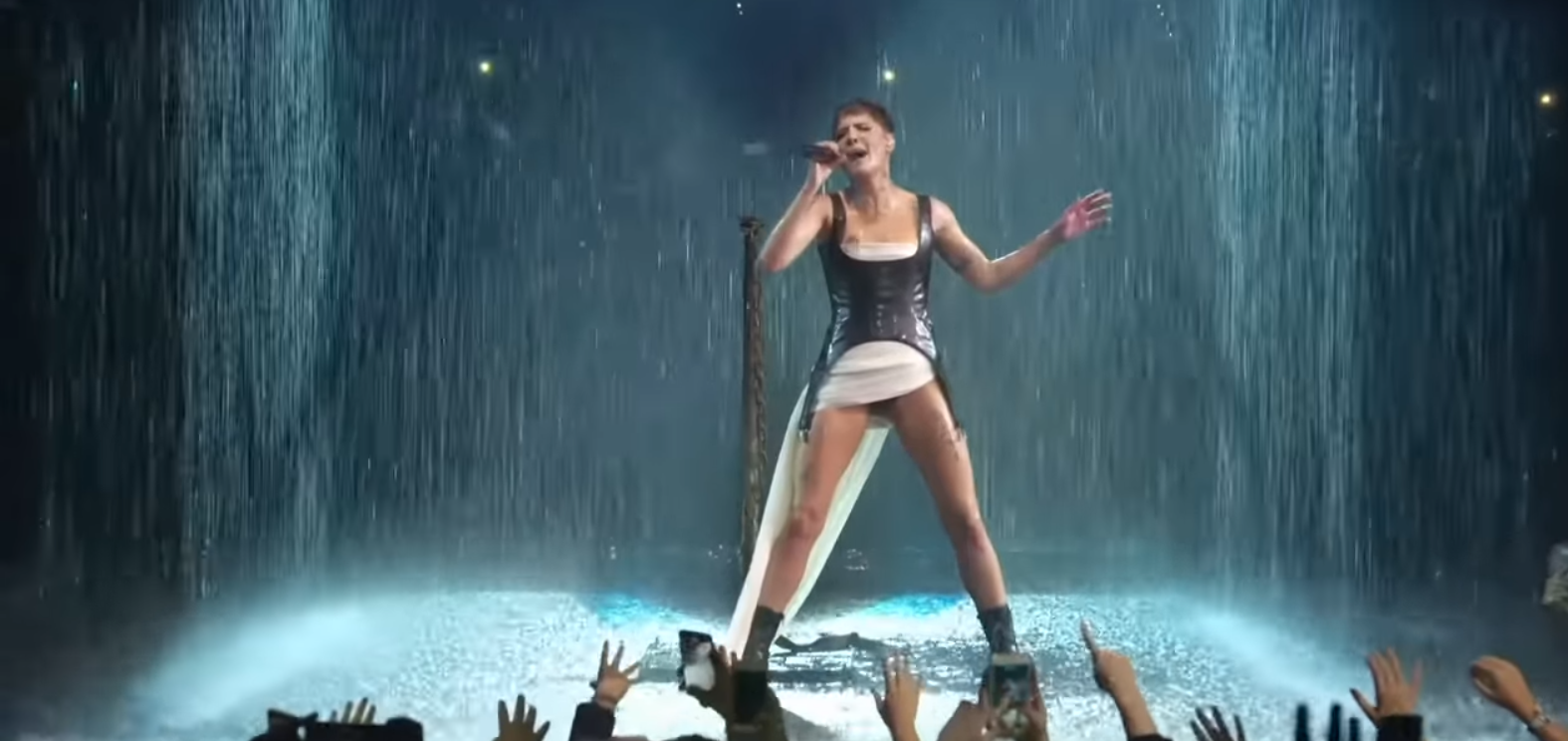
Halsey performing Without Me at 2018 MTV EMAs.

On November 4, 2018, Halsey first performed "Without Me" live at the MTV Europe Music Awards. On November 8, Halsey performed the song live on the 2018 Victoria's Secret Fashion Show, which aired on December 2. On November 15, she collaborated with Sebastián Yatra and performed a remixed version of "Without Me" live at the 2018 Latin Grammy Awards. On December 5, she delivered another live performance of the song on The Ellen DeGeneres Show. On December 8, she performed "Without Me" live at Capital's 2018 Jingle Bell Ball at the O2 Arena in London. On December 18, the singer appeared on the finale episode of The Voice to perform the song with her dance partner Jade Chynoweth playing the role of her partner. The performance received criticism on Twitter for "being inappropriate for television," to which Halsey responded saying, "[I'm] very proud to have pissed off the homophobic viewers at home who missed the message." On December 31, she performed the song live at Dick Clark's New Year's Rockin' Eve 2019. In February 2019, she performed the song on Saturday Night Live, with fans questioning if she was referencing another artist with the performance. In March, Halsey performed "Without Me" live at the 2019 iHeartRadio Music Awards. In May, she performed the song live at the 2019 Billboard Music Awards.

== Remixes ==
In October 2018, electronic music artist Nurko and DJ duo Miles Away collaborated to produce their EDM remix of the song. On November 30, 2018, American DJ Illenium released the EDM remix of the song on Capitol Records. On January 9, 2019, the singer released a remix of the song featuring American rapper Juice Wrld, whose music inspired the track's "vibe". The Juice Wrld remix was later featured on Halsey's 2020 EP, Collabs.

== Track listing ==
Digital download and streaming

1. "Without Me" – 3:21

Digital download and streaming – Illenium remix

1. "Without Me" (Illenium remix) – 4:08

Digital download and streaming – featuring Juice Wrld

1. "Without Me" (featuring Juice Wrld) – 3:48

7-inch single

1. "Without Me" – 3:21
2. "Without Me" (Illenium remix) – 4:08

== Credits and personnel ==
Credits adapted from Tidal.

- Halsey – vocals, songwriting
- Louis Bell – production, songwriting, record engineering, programming
- Brittany Amaradio – songwriting
- Amy Allen – songwriting
- Justin Timberlake – songwriting
- Timothy Mosley – songwriting
- Scott Storch – songwriting
- Serban Ghenea – mixing
- John Hanes – mixing assistance
- Chris Gehringer – mastering engineering
- Juan “Saucy” Peña - engineer
- Dylan Bauld - vocal production

== Awards and nominations ==
=== Original version ===
Year	Organization	Award	Result	Ref.
2019	iHeartRadio Music Awards	Song of the Year	Nominated	
2019	Billboard Music Awards	Top Selling Song	Nominated	
2019	American Music Awards	Favorite Song – Pop/Rock	Won	

=== Illenium remix ===
Year	Organization	Award	Result	Ref.
2019	International Dance Music Awards	Best Remix	Won	

== Charts ==
=== Weekly charts ===
Chart (2018–20)	Peak position
Argentina (Argentina Hot 100)	86
Australia (ARIA)	2
Austria (Ö3 Austria Top 40)	6
Belgium (Ultratop 50 Flanders)	17
Belgium (Ultratop 50 Wallonia)	6
Bolivia (Monitor Latino)	12
Brazil (Top 100 Brasil)	100
Canada Hot 100 (Billboard)	2
Canada AC (Billboard)	5
Canada CHR/Top 40 (Billboard)	1
Canada Hot AC (Billboard)	1
Colombia (National-Report)	98
Croatia International Airplay (HRT)	20
Czech Republic Airplay (ČNS IFPI)	58
Czech Republic Singles Digital (ČNS IFPI)	5
Denmark (Tracklisten)	5
Estonia (Eesti Tipp-40)	2
Euro Digital Song Sales (Billboard)	5
Finland (Suomen virallinen lista)	7
France (SNEP)	39
Germany (GfK)	11
Global 200 (Billboard)	135
Greece (IFPI)	1
Hungary (Single Top 40)	17
Hungary (Stream Top 40)	2
Ireland (IRMA)	3
Italy (FIMI)	33
Latvia (LAIPA)	4
Lebanon (Lebanese Top 20)	10
Lithuania (AGATA)	2
Malaysia (RIM)	2
Netherlands (Dutch Top 40)	14
Netherlands (Single Top 100)	10
New Zealand (Recorded Music NZ)	3
Norway (VG-lista)	5
Poland Airplay (ZPAV)	14
Portugal (AFP)	2
Puerto Rico (Monitor Latino)	8
Romania (Airplay 100)	8
Scottish Singles Sales (Official Charts)	10
Singapore (RIAS)	3
Slovakia Airplay (ČNS IFPI)	23
Slovakia Singles Digital (ČNS IFPI)	2
Slovenia (SloTop50)	20
Spain (Promusicae)	37
Sweden (Sverigetopplistan)	9
Switzerland (Schweizer Hitparade)	6
UK Singles (Official Charts)	3
US Billboard Hot 100	1
US Adult Contemporary (Billboard)	11
US Adult Pop Airplay (Billboard)	1
US Dance Club Songs (Billboard)	26
US Dance Airplay (Billboard)	1
US Pop Airplay (Billboard)	1
US Rhythmic Airplay (Billboard)	21
US Rolling Stone Top 100	42

=== Year-end charts ===
Chart (2018)	Position
Australia (ARIA)	66
Portugal (AFP)	119
Chart (2019)	Position
Australia (ARIA)	18
Austria (Ö3 Austria Top 40)	58
Belgium (Ultratop Flanders)	79
Belgium (Ultratop Wallonia)	55
Canada (Canadian Hot 100)	4
Denmark (Tracklisten)	27
Germany (Official German Charts)	49
Iceland (Tónlistinn)	27
Ireland (IRMA)	38
Latvia (LAIPA)	34
Malaysia (RIM)	8
Netherlands (Dutch Top 40)	81
Netherlands (Single Top 100)	66
New Zealand (Recorded Music NZ)	12
Portugal (AFP)	26
Romania (Airplay 100)	13
Sweden (Sverigetopplistan)	61
Switzerland (Schweizer Hitparade)	33
UK Singles (Official Charts Company)	40
US Billboard Hot 100	3
US Adult Contemporary (Billboard)	30
US Adult Top 40 (Billboard)	4
US Dance/Mix Show Airplay (Billboard)	7
US Mainstream Top 40 (Billboard)	1
US Rolling Stone Top 100	8
Worldwide	10

=== Decade-end charts ===
Chart (2010–2019)	Position
US Billboard Hot 100	12

== Certifications ==
Region	Certification	Certified units/sales
Australia (ARIA)	8× Platinum	560,000^{‡}
Austria (IFPI Austria)	Gold	15,000^{‡}
Belgium (BRMA)	Platinum	40,000^{‡}
Brazil (Pro-Música Brasil)	7× Diamond	1,120,000^{‡}
Canada (Music Canada)	9× Platinum	720,000^{‡}
Denmark (IFPI Danmark)	3× Platinum	270,000^{‡}
France (SNEP)	Gold	100,000^{‡}
Germany (BVMI)	Platinum	400,000^{‡}
Italy (FIMI)	Platinum	50,000^{‡}
Mexico (AMPROFON)	2× Diamond+Platinum+Gold	690,000^{‡}
New Zealand (RMNZ)	7× Platinum	210,000^{‡}
Norway (IFPI Norway)	2× Platinum	120,000^{‡}
Poland (ZPAV)	3× Platinum	150,000^{‡}
Portugal (AFP)	2× Platinum	20,000^{‡}
Spain (Promusicae)	Platinum	60,000^{‡}
United Kingdom (BPI)	3× Platinum	1,800,000^{‡}
United States (RIAA)	14× Platinum	14,000,000^{‡}
Streaming
Sweden (GLF)	3× Platinum	24,000,000^{†}
^{‡} Sales+streaming figures based on certification alone.^{†} Streaming-only figures based on certification alone.

== Release history ==
Region	Date	Format	Version	Label	Ref.
Various	October 4, 2018	Digital download; streaming	Original	Capitol	

== See also ==
- List of Billboard Hot 100 number ones of 2019
- List of Billboard Hot 100 top-ten singles in 2019
- List of number-one digital songs of 2019 (U.S.)
- List of top 10 singles for 2019 in Australia
- List of UK top-ten singles in 2019
