= Me! =

2019 song by Taylor Swift featuring Brendon Urie

Single by Taylor Swift featuring Brendon Urie of Panic! at the Disco

from the album Lover
- Released: April 26, 2019
- Studio: Electric Lady (New York City); Golden Age West (Auckland)
- Genre: Bubblegum pop; synth-pop
- Length: 3:13
- Label: Republic
- Songwriters: Taylor Swift; Joel Little; Brendon Urie
- Producers: Taylor Swift; Joel Little

Taylor Swift singles chronology
"Getaway Car" (2018)	"Me!" (2019)	"You Need to Calm Down" (2019)

Brendon Urie singles chronology
"Roses" (2018)	"Me!" (2019)

Music video
- "Me!" on YouTube

"Me!" (stylized in all caps) is a song by the American singer-songwriter Taylor Swift featuring Brendon Urie of the American band Panic! at the Disco. It was released on April 26, 2019, as the lead single from Swift's seventh studio album, Lover, by Republic Records. Written by Urie, Swift, and Joel Little, and produced by the latter two, "Me!" is an upbeat bubblegum pop and synth-pop track driven by a marching band drumline. It is about embracing one's individuality, self-affirmation, and self-love.

Music critics described the production as cheery or campy; they either found the track catchy and tongue-in-cheek or deemed it immature and cloying. On the U.S. Billboard Hot 100, "Me!" debuted at number 100 and jumped to number two the next week, breaking the record for the biggest single-week jump in the chart's history. The single was certified double-platinum by the Recording Industry Association of America. It reached number one in Ecuador, Hungary, and Nicaragua, as well as the top ten in many territories and received platinum or higher certifications in Australia, Brazil, Canada, New Zealand, Poland, and the United Kingdom.

Swift and Dave Meyers directed the music video for "Me!", which features bright and colorful aesthetics. Critics commented that it was a symbolic departure from the dark aesthetics of Swift's past album, Reputation (2017). The video claimed the Vevo record for the highest 24-hour views, amassing over 65.2 million views within its first day of release. In 2019, it won Best Visual Effects at the MTV Video Music Awards, Best Video at the MTV Europe Music Awards, and Best Female International Artist Video at the MTV Video Music Awards Japan. Swift performed "Me!" live on many televised events, including the 2019 Billboard Music Awards, The Voice, and Good Morning America.

== Background and release ==
On April 13, 2019, a countdown to midnight on April 26 appeared on Taylor Swift's website, leading to speculation about the release of new music. On April 25, various news outlets reported that a mural of a butterfly in The Gulch neighborhood of Nashville, Tennessee, painted by street artist Kelsey Montague, was connected with the upcoming release. A crowd of several hundred gathered at the mural as the word "Me!" was added to it by Montague. While Montague was initially told that the mural was commissioned as promotion for ABC, ESPN and the 2019 NFL draft, Swift appeared at the mural and revealed that it was in fact part of her countdown promotion and that she would be interviewed by Robin Roberts during the NFL Draft broadcast with further information. At the interview she confirmed the release of a new song and music video at midnight, sharing the title as well as the feature from Urie.

== Composition ==
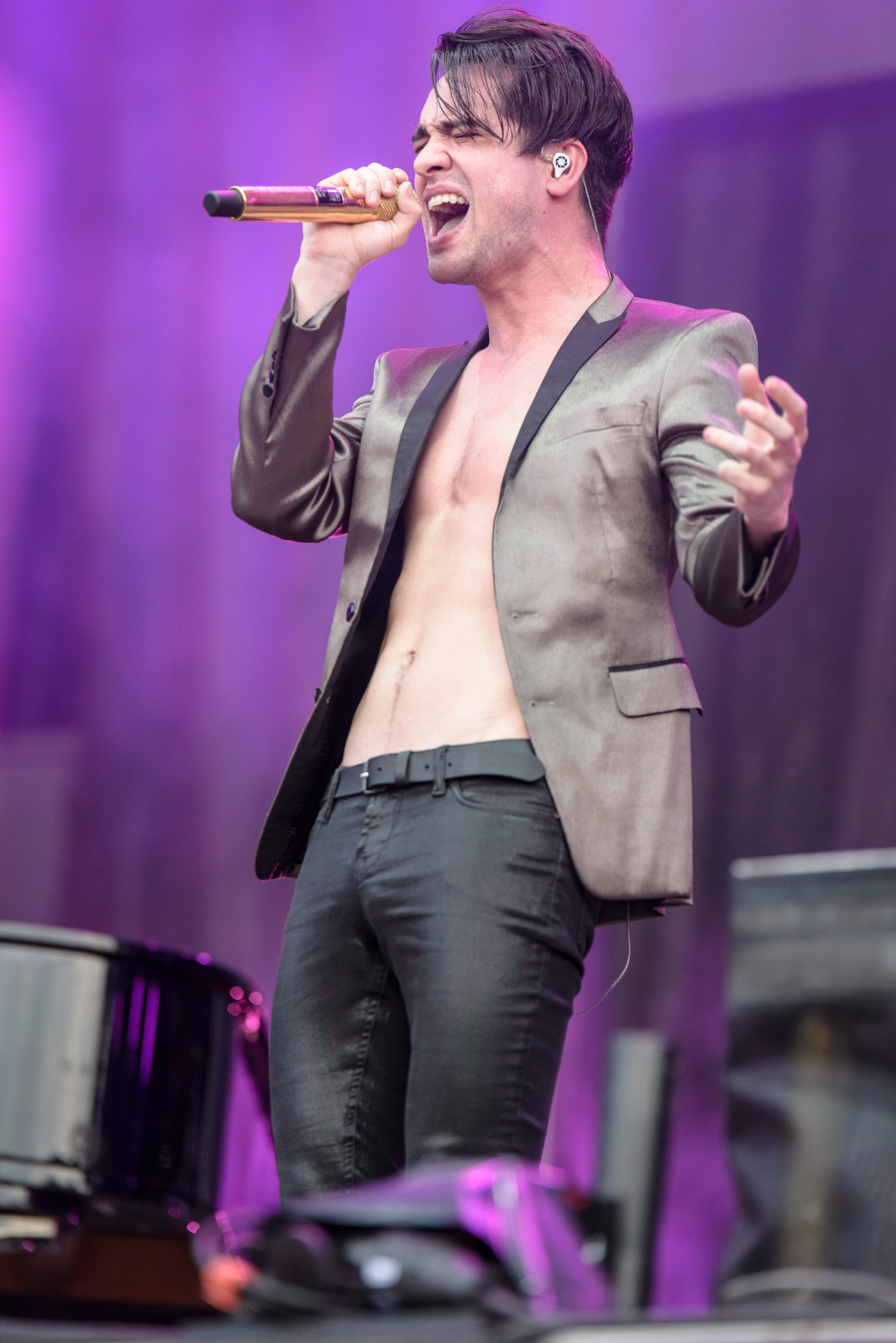
Brendon Urie of Panic! at the Disco is featured in the song, who also co-wrote the song. "Me!" is Swift's first lead single to have a featured artist.

With a pop song, we have an ability to get a melody stuck in people's heads, and I just want it to be one that makes them feel better about themselves, not worse.

— Swift talking about "Me!"

"Me!" is a bubblegum and synth-pop song, driven by a marching band drumline. It was written by Swift, Joel Little of Goodnight Nurse and Brendon Urie of Panic! at the Disco, and produced by Swift and Little. The song was initially developed as a slow, acoustic, piano ballad. The song is performed in the key of C major in common time with a tempo of 91 beats per minute. It follows an I–vi–IV–V chord progression known as the '50s progression (in C major, this is C–Am–F–G). The song's vocals span from F_{3} to E_{5}.

In an interview with Robin Roberts, Swift described the song as about "embracing your individuality and really owning it". On August 21, 2019, it was reported that the lyric "Hey, kids, spelling is fun!" was removed from all digital and streaming versions of the song, including the album version.

== Critical reception ==
"Me!" received mixed reviews from music critics. Forbes's Hugh McIntyre wrote that it "isn't just a pop song, it's the momentary escape we all need". Roisin O'Connor of The Independent wrote that "Swift once again proves her mastery of the infectious pop hook in one of the most drastic reinventions of her career to date". Time's Raisa Bruner noted that Swift "veers away from her normally specific songwriting to instead offer up an anthem of self-love", and added that even though it "doesn't hit the emotional notes of her [Swift's] most memorable work, it makes a strong statement".

In an article titled "'ME!' Is Everything Wrong With Pop", The Atlantic's Spencer Kornhaber wrote that the song "has almost none of the elements that once made [Swift] interesting, but it does have a dolphin screech for a chorus". Rob Harvilla of The Ringer opined "'Me!' is a cloyingly goofy Disney-pop confection with an earworm chorus and a certain try-hard insidiousness to it". Writing for Pitchfork, Anna Gaca stated that it "is a showcase for the worst and weakest aspects of Swift's work", and added "it is not hard to write a better song than this". NME's Rhian Daly wrote that the lyrics of "Me!" "are just surface messaging about self-love and acceptance, the kind of hollow #positivity that is slapped on greeting cards and slogan t-shirts and sold as empowering". Writing for the Los Angeles Times, Mikael Wood stated that the song features "her weakest lyrics ever" and that "nothing about this song advances our thinking about Swift". Slate's Carl Wilson called it "fluffy and immaterial", adding that Swift and Urie "just traipse through a kiss-and-make-up number out of a teen musical".

Writing for The Daily Telegraph, Kate Solomon opined that "she's concocted what might be her most pop song to date," and went on to say that "the low point might be Swift shouting out, 'Spelling is fun, kids!' like a manic summer camp counsellor because she's noticed that 'you can't spell awesome without me'". The Spinoff's Alice Webb-Liddall wrote "I was prepared to like it until Taylor yelled 'Spelling is fun' and from that point in the video I felt a little bit sick". Matthew McAuley from the same magazine opined that Urie "pulled out all of the stops to try and ruin this one". Writing for The Independent, Alexandra Pollard stated that the song is "so blandly uncontroversial that there is literally nothing to say about it", and that it "has proven something of a damp squib".

== Awards and nominations ==
Awards and nominations for "Me!"
Year	Ceremony	Category	Result	Ref.
2019	MTV Europe Music Awards	Best Video	Won	
2019	MTV Video Music Awards	Best Collaboration	Nominated	
2019	MTV Video Music Awards	Best Visual Effects	Won	
2019	MTV Video Music Awards	Best Cinematography	Nominated	
2019	MTV Video Music Awards Japan	Best Female International Artist Video	Won	
2019	People's Choice Awards	Music Video of 2019	Nominated	
2019	Teen Choice Awards	Choice Song: Female Artist	Nominated	
2019	Teen Choice Awards	Choice Pop Song	Nominated	
2019	Dance Magazine Awards	Best Music Video	Won	
2019	Guinness World Records	Most Viewed Vevo Video in 24 Hours	Won	
2019	Guinness World Records	Most Views for a Solo Artist Music Video in 24 Hours on YouTube	Won	
2020	iHeartRadio Music Awards	Best Music Video	Nominated	
2020	iHeartRadio Music Awards	Favorite Music Video Choreography	Nominated	
2020	Nickelodeon Kids' Choice Awards	Favorite Music Collaboration	Nominated	
2020	ASCAP awards	Award-winning Song	Won	
2020	Hito Music Awards	Best Western Song	Won	
2020	BMI Pop Awards	Award-winning Song	Won	
2020	BMI Pop Awards	Publisher of the Year (Sony/ATV)	Won	

== Commercial performance ==
The song broke four Amazon Music records that includes most first-day streams, most first-week streams and most on-demand voice requests with Alexa of a single debut on the platform. On Spotify, "Me!" opened at number one on the Global Spotify charts with 7.94 million streams dated April 26, 2019, beating her 2017 hit, "Look What You Made Me Do", which opened with 7.90 million streams dated August 25, 2017. "Me!" debuted at number 100 on the Billboard Hot 100, and ascended 98 spots to its peak of number two in its second week, behind "Old Town Road" by Lil Nas X featuring Billy Ray Cyrus, becoming the biggest single-week jump in the Hot 100's history, beating the record previously set by Kelly Clarkson's "My Life Would Suck Without You". The song debuted at number one on the Billboard Digital Song Sales chart, as Swift's record-extending sixteenth chart topper, with 193,000 sold, and at number two on Billboard's Streaming Songs chart, with 50 million U.S. streams garnered within a week. In Canada, "Me!" had a very similar run on the charts as it did in the U.S. On the Canadian Hot 100, "Me!" opened at number two, while debuting atop the Canadian Digital Songs Sales chart.

In the United Kingdom, "Me!" debuted and peaked at number three on the UK Singles Chart, becoming Swift's 12th top ten hit song in Britain. It also sold 67,000 downloads within its first week, making it Britain's second biggest female sales debut of 2019, behind Ariana Grande's "7 Rings". "Me!" garnered the most video streams in the UK among Swift's collaborations, at 18.4 million streams.

In Iceland, "Me!" debuted at number four on the Íslenski listinn, becoming Brendon Urie's highest-charting single in the country. In Ireland, "Me!" debuted at number five on the Irish Singles Chart on May 4, 2019. In the rest of Europe, "Me!" peaked at number one in Hungary, number three in Croatia and Israel, number four in Iceland, Greece, Latvia, and Slovakia, number five in the Czech Republic, Estonia, and Lithuania, number seven in Austria, number nine in Norway and Slovenia, and number ten in Poland. It was less successful in France, in which the song peaked at number 66, but was the highest-charting "Lover" song, until the resurgence of "Cruel Summer" (2023) which peaked at number 52.

In Australia, "Me!" debuted and peaked at number two on the ARIA Singles Chart dated May 4, 2019, becoming Swift's seventeenth top ten hit in Australia.

In New Zealand, "Me" debuted at number three on the New Zealand Singles Chart, tallying Swift's fourteenth and Urie's first top 10 in the country.

== Music video ==
The music video for "Me!" premiered on YouTube at midnight EDT (04:00 UTC) on April 26, 2019, in a live premiere format, prefaced by a Q&A chat in the live chat text with Swift. It was directed by Swift and Dave Meyers. On April 27, 2019, it was announced that the music video amassed 65.2 million views within its first day of release, breaking the 24-hour Vevo record previously held by Ariana Grande's "Thank U, Next". The video also broke Swift's personal record set in 2017 with the "Look What You Made Me Do" music video, which garnered 43.2 million views on August 28, 2017. The music video also became the most-viewed video in 24 hours by female artist, a record that was later surpassed by Blackpink's "How You Like That" video in June 2020.

Swift has stated that there are multiple Easter eggs in the video, and that there are three levels of them in the video, from most obvious to least obvious, which point to clues about the upcoming album, single, and tour. It was revealed that "You Need to Calm Down", a line Urie says to Swift at the beginning in French, would be the second single, and an "old-timey, 1940s-sounding instrumental version" of the song plays in the background in the same scene. The album title Lover was correctly guessed in advance. Other potential titles that were speculated of being on the album were "Kaleidoscope", "Home" and "Awesome". The portrait of The Chicks was later revealed to be a reference to a collaboration for the song "Soon You'll Get Better" on the album.

The music video received three nominations at the 2019 MTV Video Music Awards, winning Best Visual Effects. A lyric video was released May 1, 2019.

=== Synopsis ===
Swift sits on a unicorn-shaped eave as the dress turns into a waterfall. The word "Lover" in the background was an example of Easter eggs that Swift placed in the video, as it was later revealed to be the album title.

The setting of the video seems to be set within a chrysalis. The music video opens with a snake slithering on a floor which then explodes into a flock of colourful butterflies, symbolically ending her previous era, Reputation, where snakes were a motif, and welcoming the inception of the upcoming one. The video pans up to an apartment unit in which Swift and Urie are engaging in an argument in French, with hard subtitles provided. In the argument, Swift refers to her cats Meredith and Olivia as her "daughters". Swift is wearing a black and white tulle dress with floral accents (which is similar to the black and white dress worn by the actress Grace Kelly in the film Rear Window). Swift then leaves the room without Urie and starts singing the song upon closing the door in the hallway. Swift walks down the hallway, and the camera briefly cuts onto a group of framed artwork hung on the apartment of chicks in sunglasses and a portrait of The Chicks during the line "and there's a lot of cool chicks out there". Swift is then seen walking to the lobby accompanied with several thunderclouds, one of which is in the form of a snake that tries to swallow her up but turns to dust upon doing so. The video cuts to a scene where a suit-clad Swift dances with her backup dancers, who are holding office bags. Urie looks out onto the street from the apartment and jumps down the balcony on an umbrella Mary Poppins-style wearing a floral print suit.

He lands on the roof of a building with a unicorn-shaped eave, where Swift is seen sitting at the edge in a pink dress that turns into a waterfall. This is where the Lover sign is spotted. Urie then tries and fails to win Swift over with classic and banal items such as a bouquet of flowers and a ring. He then awes her by presenting a cat, which Taylor later adopted as her third pet and named Benjamin Button. The camera cuts to Urie opening his heart, which is revealed to be a kaleidoscope. Swift has revealed on an Instagram livestream that this is a reference to her 2014 song "Welcome to New York", where she sings "kaleidoscope of loud heartbeats under coats". Urie and Swift then sing on a heart-shaped pinkish-orange stage, joined with a band of angels and go-go dancers wearing 1960s mod style clothing. As the bridge plays, Swift and Urie don blue marching band uniforms and dance with a group of dancers in the same attire, but pink. The video then cuts to a scene of the duo dancing on a floating window with a psychedelic-esque background. The last scene then depicts Swift in a blue attire that melts into what seems to be liquid bubblegum while a running Urie summons the same rain-like pastel liquid around the street. The video ends with the duo entering the same apartment building with an umbrella as the bubblegum rain continues on the street in the night.

In her Netflix documentary Miss Americana, Swift describes the concept of the music video as having been based on the song's message of individualism and self-empowerment, by demonstrating the hobbies and characteristics that make herself and Urie unique: emo kids and musical theatre for Urie, and cats, gay pride, and cowboy boots for Swift.

=== Reception ===
The video broke the Vevo record, as well as the YouTube record for most views in the first 24 hours for a lead female video, and the third most-viewed overall earning 65.2 million views. It also broke the Vevo record of the fastest video to reach 100 million views at the time, doing so in 79 hours.

Chris Willman of Variety described the music video as a "phantasmagorical delight" that induces an instant "sugar rush" in a "bubblegum psychedelia".

== Live performances, covers, and usage in media ==
On May 1, 2019, Swift and Urie opened the 2019 Billboard Music Awards with a performance of "Me!". On May 21, 2019, Swift and Urie performed the song at the finale of the sixteenth season of The Voice. Swift and Urie also performed the song on June 1, 2019, at the 2019 Wango Tango. She performed a solo version of the song at the finale of the fourteen season of Germany's Next Topmodel on May 23, on The Graham Norton Show in the United Kingdom, and at the eighth season of the French version of The Voice along with "Shake It Off" on May 25, 2019. On July 10, 2019, Swift performed the song at her headlining Amazon Prime Day concert along with "You Need to Calm Down" and a number of songs from her previous albums.

She performed the song along with "You Need to Calm Down" and "Shake It Off" at a Good Morning America concert in Central Park on August 22. On September 9, Swift performed the song at the City of Lover one-off concert at L'Olympia in Paris, France. She released this live version on digital music platforms on May 17, 2020. On October 19, she performed the song at the We Can Survive charity concert in Los Angeles. She performed the song on the Sukkiri Morning Show in Tokyo, Japan on November 7, and the Alibaba Singles' Day Gala in Shanghai, China on November 10. On December 8, Swift performed the song at Capital FM's Jingle Bell Ball 2019 in London. On December 13, she performed the song at iHeartRadio Z100's Jingle Ball in New York City.

Hours after the song's release, ABC and ESPN used the song for their intro for night 2 of the 2019 NFL draft, a day after Swift broke the news of the song's release, in an interview with ABC's Robin Roberts. The song was also used in a commercial Swift filmed in partnership with Capital One in 2019. The song was excluded from the set list for The Eras Tour, but was performed as a surprise song on the November 20, 2023 show in Rio de Janeiro.

On May 29, 2019, American duo Niki and Gabi released a parody of "Me!" on YouTube. On June 28, 2021, a cover of "Me!" by the Taiwanese singer Tzuyu, a member of the South Korean girl group Twice, featuring Bang Chan of Stray Kids, was released. A 10-second teaser of the cover was posted to YouTube on June 22, 2021, which accumulated 1.7 million views in a day.

== Credits and personnel ==
Credits adapted from the CD liner notes of "Me!"

- Taylor Swift – vocals, songwriter, producer
- Joel Little – producer, songwriter, drum programming, guitar, keyboards, record engineering, synthesizer programming
- Brendon Urie – vocals, songwriter
- John Rooney – record engineering assistance
- Serban Ghenea – mix engineering
- John Hanes – mix engineering
- Randy Merrill – master engineering

== Charts ==
=== Weekly charts ===
Weekly chart performance for "Me!"
Chart (2019)	Peak position
Argentina (Argentina Hot 100)	42
Australia (ARIA)	2
Austria (Ö3 Austria Top 40)	7
Belgium (Ultratop 50 Flanders)	20
Belgium (Ultratop 50 Wallonia)	36
Bolivia (Monitor Latino)	7
Brazil Airplay (Crowley Charts)	87
Brazil International Pop Airplay (Crowley Charts)	6
Canada Hot 100 (Billboard)	2
Canada AC (Billboard)	2
Canada CHR/Top 40 (Billboard)	4
Canada Hot AC (Billboard)	3
China Airplay/FL (Billboard)	1
CIS Airplay (TopHit)	122
Colombia (National-Report)	23
Costa Rica (Monitor Latino)	6
Croatia (HRT)	3
Czech Republic Airplay (ČNS IFPI)	6
Czech Republic Singles Digital (ČNS IFPI)	5
Denmark (Tracklisten)	19
Denmark Airplay (Tracklisten)	1
Ecuador (National-Report)	1
El Salvador (Monitor Latino)	3
Estonia (Eesti Tipp-40)	5
Euro Digital Songs (Billboard)	1
Finland (Suomen virallinen lista)	16
France (SNEP)	66
Germany (GfK)	12
Germany Airplay (BVMI)	3
Greece International (IFPI)	4
Guatemala (Monitor Latino)	15
Honduras (Monitor Latino)	10
Hungary (Editors' Choice Top 40)	6
Hungary (Single Top 40)	1
Hungary (Stream Top 40)	4
Iceland (Tónlistinn)	4
Ireland (IRMA)	5
Israel (Media Forest)	3
Italy (FIMI)	19
Japan Hot 100 (Billboard)	6
Japan Combined Singles (Oricon)	22
Latvia (LAIPA)	4
Lebanon (OLT20 Combined)	2
Luxembourg Digital Song Sales (Billboard)	4
Malaysia (RIM)	2
Lithuania (AGATA)	5
Mexico (Monitor Latino)	2
Mexico Airplay (Billboard)	1
Netherlands (Dutch Top 40)	17
Netherlands (Single Top 100)	21
New Zealand (Recorded Music NZ)	3
Nicaragua (Monitor Latino)	1
Norway (VG-lista)	9
Panama (Monitor Latino)	9
Peru (Monitor Latino)	19
Poland Airplay (ZPAV)	10
Portugal (AFP)	11
Portugal Digital Song Sales (Billboard)	1
Romania (Airplay 100)	67
Scottish Singles Sales (Official Charts)	1
Singapore (RIAS)	21
Slovakia Airplay (ČNS IFPI)	9
Slovakia Singles Digital (ČNS IFPI)	4
Slovenia (SloTop50)	9
South Korea (Gaon)	134
Spain (Promusicae)	36
Spain Airplay (Promusicae)	12
Sweden (Sverigetopplistan)	11
Switzerland (Schweizer Hitparade)	12
Switzerland Airplay (Schweizer Hitparade)	10
UK Singles (Official Charts)	3
US Billboard Hot 100	2
US Adult Contemporary (Billboard)	6
US Adult Pop Airplay (Billboard)	5
US Dance Airplay (Billboard)	19
US Dance Club Songs (Billboard)	8
US Pop Airplay (Billboard)	7
U.S. Rolling Stone Top 100	27
Venezuela (National-Report)	10

=== Year-end charts ===
2019 year-end chart performance for "Me!"
Chart (2019)	Position
Argentina (Monitor Latino)	31
Australia (ARIA)	68
Belgium (Ultratop Flanders)	80
Bolivia (Monitor Latino)	84
Canada (Canadian Hot 100)	35
Costa Rica (Monitor Latino)	66
El Salvador (Monitor Latino)	51
Guatemala (Monitor Latino)	79
Honduras (Monitor Latino)	52
Hungary (Single Top 40)	85
Hungary (Stream Top 40)	85
Iceland (Tónlistinn)	95
Japan Hot Overseas (Billboard)	7
Japan Streaming Songs (Billboard Japan)	75
Mexico (Monitor Latino)	50
Nicaragua (Monitor Latino)	40
Netherlands (Dutch Top 40)	95
Panama (Monitor Latino)	77
Poland (ZPAV)	100
Portugal (AFP)	193
Slovenia (SloTop50)	48
Tokyo (Tokio Hot 100)	3
UK Singles (Official Charts Company)	71
U.S. Billboard Hot 100	43
U.S. Adult Contemporary (Billboard)	18
U.S. Adult Top 40 (Billboard)	22
U.S. Mainstream Top 40 (Billboard)	41
U.S. Rolling Stone Top 100	50

== Certifications ==
Certifications for "Me!"
Region	Certification	Certified units/sales
Australia (ARIA)	5× Platinum	350,000^{‡}
Austria (IFPI Austria)	Platinum	30,000^{‡}
Brazil (Pro-Música Brasil)	Diamond	160,000^{‡}
Canada (Music Canada)	Platinum	80,000^{‡}
Denmark (IFPI Danmark)	Gold	45,000^{‡}
Germany (BVMI)	Gold	200,000^{‡}
Italy (FIMI)	Gold	35,000^{‡}
Mexico (AMPROFON)	Gold	30,000^{‡}
New Zealand (RMNZ)	2× Platinum	60,000^{‡}
Norway (IFPI Norway)	Gold	30,000^{‡}
Poland (ZPAV)	Platinum	20,000^{‡}
Portugal (AFP)	Platinum	10,000^{‡}
Spain (Promusicae)	Gold	30,000^{‡}
United Kingdom (BPI)	Platinum	600,000^{‡}
United States (RIAA)	2× Platinum	2,000,000^{‡}
Streaming
Japan (RIAJ)	Gold	50,000,000^{†}
^{‡} Sales+streaming figures based on certification alone.^{†} Streaming-only figures based on certification alone.

== Release history ==
Release dates and formats for "Me!"
Region	Date	Format(s)	Version	Label	Ref.
Various	April 26, 2019	Digital download; streaming	Original	Republic	
Italy	April 26, 2019	Radio airplay	Original	Universal	
United States	April 29, 2019	Adult contemporary radio	Original	Republic	
United States	April 30, 2019	Contemporary hit radio	Original	Republic	
Various	May 1, 2019	7-inch single; 12-inch picture disc; CD single; digital download	2019 BBMAs exclusive live rehearsal	Republic	
Various	May 1, 2019	7-inch single; 12-inch picture disc; CD single; digital download	Original	Republic	
China	December 14, 2019	CD single	Original	Universal	
Various	May 17, 2020	Digital download; streaming	Live	Republic	

== See also ==
- List of Billboard Hot 100 top-ten singles in 2019
- List of number-one digital songs of 2019 (U.S.)
- List of UK top-ten singles in 2019
- List of top 10 singles in 2019 (Australia)
- List of number-one digital tracks of 2019 (Australia)
- List of airplay number-one hits of the 2010s (Argentina)
