= You Need to Calm Down =

2019 single by Taylor Swift

Single by Taylor Swift

from the album Lover
- Released: June 14, 2019
- Studio: Golden Age (Los Angeles); Golden Age West (Auckland)
- Genre: Electropop; synth-pop
- Length: 2:51
- Label: Republic
- Songwriters: Taylor Swift; Joel Little
- Producers: Taylor Swift; Joel Little

Taylor Swift singles chronology
"Me!" (2019)	"You Need to Calm Down" (2019)	"Lover" (2019)

Music video
- "You Need to Calm Down" on YouTube

"You Need to Calm Down" is a song by the American singer-songwriter Taylor Swift and the second single from her seventh studio album, Lover (2019). Republic Records released it for download and streaming on June 14, 2019. Written and produced by Swift and Joel Little, "You Need to Calm Down" is a midtempo electropop and synth-pop song that is set over steady synth beats and has a refrain of ascending echoes. In the lyrics, Swift addresses Internet trolls and homophobes and voices her support for the LGBTQ+ community.

Swift directed the music video for "You Need to Calm Down" with Drew Kirsch and executive-produced it with Todrick Hall. The video features an ensemble cast and many LGBT celebrity cameos. Music critics were divided on "You Need to Calm Down", some praising the catchy production and pro-gay message, while others found it confusing and cynical. Despite the polarized reaction, media publications generally regard "You Need to Calm Down" as a gay anthem. The single reached number one in Scotland, number two in the United States, and the top five in Australia, Canada, Ireland, Malaysia, New Zealand, and the United Kingdom.

At the 2019 MTV Video Music Awards, the music video for "You Need to Calm Down" received nine nominations, winning Video of the Year and Video for Good. The song also received a nomination for Best Pop Solo Performance at the 62nd Grammy Awards. Swift included "You Need to Calm Down" in many live concerts and as part of the set list to her Eras Tour (2023–2024).

== Background and release ==
Upon finishing her 2018 Reputation Stadium Tour, Taylor Swift wrote songs for her seventh studio album, Lover. She felt moved by the connections with her fans on tour, which inspired her to channel the vulnerability into her songwriting.

On June 13, 2019, via an Instagram live stream, she announced her seventh album, Lover, which was slated for release on August 23 via Republic Records. She also announced "You Need to Calm Down" as the album's second single, following the lead single "Me!". Swift revealed that she had contained an "old-timey, 1940s-sounding" instrumental of "You Need to Calm Down" in a scene of the "Me!" music video. "You Need to Calm Down" and its lyric video were released for streaming on June 14, 2019. A vertical video premiered exclusively on Spotify on June 24, 2019, and a remix by the British electronic music band Clean Bandit was released on August 20, 2019.

According to Swift, the main inspiration for "You Need to Calm Down" came when she felt "dismayed" after a friend of hers told her that she was not obvious on her political stance regarding gay rights, specifically when that friend asked her what she would do if she had a gay son; that conversation made her realize that she was not adequately "educated" on the matter. The lyric video changes the word "glad" in the lyrics to GLAAD, and highlighting "EA" letters as a reference to the Equality Act. The references followed Swift's donation to GLAAD in support of Pride Month, and Swift's Change.org petition for the United States Senate to pass the Equality Act. The petition attracted more than 500,000 signatures, including from Democrats such as Cory Booker, Elizabeth Warren, Beto O'Rourke, and Kirsten Gillibrand. Following the release of the song, GLAAD reported an "influx" of donations in the amount of $13, a reference to Swift's favorite number.

== Composition and lyrics ==
"You Need to Calm Down"
"You Need to Calm Down" is an upbeat electropop and synth-pop song with steady synth beats and ascending echoes. Its lyrics target internet trolls, cyberbullies and homophobes.

Swift wrote and produced "You Need to Calm Down" with Joel Little, who programmed the drums, played the keyboard, and recorded the track at Golden Age Studio in Los Angeles and Golden Age West in Auckland. The song was mixed by Serban Ghenea at MixStar Studios in Virginia Beach. "You Need to Calm Down" is an electropop and synth-pop song with a minimal electronic production driven by a consistent synth bassline and synthesizer beats. Swift sings the verses in a near-rap delivery and the refrain contains ascending echoes of "Oh-oh"s.

The lyrics tackle homophobia and expresses support for the LGBT community and denounce Internet trolls, cancel culture, and cyberbullying. Swift organized the song such that each verse addresses a theme: the first is about trolls and cancel culture ("You are somebody that I don't know/ But you're taking shots at me like it's Patrón"), the second is about homophobes and protestors outside her concerts ("Sunshine on the street at the parade/ But you would rather be in the dark ages/ Making that sign, must've taken all night"), and the third is about "successful women being pitted against each other" ("And we see you over there on the internet/ Comparing all the girls who are killing it/ But we figured you out/ We all know now, we all got crowns"). Swift explained that the song's LGBT theme could fit in with Lover's concept about love because it addresses "how certain people are not allowed to live their lives without discrimination just based on who they love".

== Critical reception ==
"You Need to Calm Down" divided critics. Dan Stubbs from NME called the song "withering in its measured response", concluding it was "an infectious, bite-size pop package". Gwen Ihnat of The A.V. Club wrote that the song "clearly and refreshingly combats homophobia and anti-gay bias". Maeve McDermott and Joshua Bote, writing for USA Today, considered the song "an improvement" over the previous single "Me!", and "a more promising example of what fans can expect" from the album. Mikael Wood of the Los Angeles Times also concurred that the song was "a big creative improvement" over "Me!", while commenting the "explicit pro-gay message is certainly welcome, but it also feels just the slightest bit cynical". Time's Raisa Bruner wrote that the song is "bright, bubbly and unabashedly vying for earworm status", and that it is a "colorful clapback that works as a warning to homophobes, trolls and bullies". She added that Swift is "sing-talking her way through a series of quotable lyrics, over a "juicy, unhurried" synth beat. Bruner further stated that, at this song, Swift is "at her most pop-forward" on Lover, owing to its cascading chorus echoes.

Michelle Kim of Pitchfork wrote that, while the song is "well-intentioned" and the allyship deserved some praise, it is also "bewildering and underwhelming at the same time". Justin Kirkland of Esquire wrote the song "misses the point of being an LGBTQ ally" by "equating online haters with the personal and societal struggle of LGBTQ+ people". Similarly, Spencer Kornhaber from The Atlantic criticised the song's "breathtaking argument... that famous people are persecuted in a way meaningfully comparable to queer people." Music critic Todd Nathanson described it as "a very trivializing song," specifically criticizing the line "shade never made anybody less gay" as minimizing the impact of homophobia. Will Gottsegen of Spin wrote the song's "easy, inoffensive lyrics... feel engineered to appeal to the broadest possible demographic", and that the song "plays it too safe" and "feels a little like a cop out". Constance Grady of Vox called the song "exhausting", comparing the song unfavorably to "Mean" (2011), another single from Swift. The Herald-Tribune named "You Need to Calm Down" as the second-best song of 2019.

== Commercial performance ==
In the United States, "You Need to Calm Down" debuted and peaked at number two on the Billboard Hot 100, becoming the second top two hit from Lover. Like in the case of lead single "Me!", "Old Town Road" by Lil Nas X featuring Billy Ray Cyrus blocked "You Need to Calm Down" from reaching the top spot on the chart. However, the song garnered several chart records for Swift: with six songs reaching the number-two spot, Swift tied Madonna as the female artist with the most number two hits on the chart, having previously reached the spot with "Me!", "I Don't Wanna Live Forever" (2017), "I Knew You Were Trouble" (2013), "Today Was a Fairytale" (2010) and "You Belong with Me" (2009). The song became Swift's twenty-fourth top 10 hit, which is the fifth-most among female artists in the chart's history, behind Madonna (38), Rihanna (31), Mariah Carey (28) and Janet Jackson (27). The single is also Swift's sixteenth song to debut inside the top 10 of the chart, which is the second most top-ten debuts in the chart's history, only behind Drake, who has 20 top-ten debuts, making Swift the first and only female artist with 16 top-ten debuts in the Hot 100 history.

The song debuted at number-one on the Billboard Digital Song Sales charts, selling 79,000 downloads, becoming Swift's record-extending seventeenth number-one hit on that chart. The track started at number 33 on the Mainstream Top 40 chart, based on three days of airplay, and eventually peaked at number nine.

In Canada, the song entered the Hot AC chart at number 40 based on three days of radio tracking. It debuted at number four on the Canadian Hot 100, becoming the second top five hit from the album in the country.

In the United Kingdom, the song debuted at number five on the UK Singles Chart, becoming Swift's thirteenth top 10 in the UK. In Scotland, the song debuted at number one on the singles chart, becoming Swift's fifth chart topper in the country, as well as her second consecutive number-one hit in Scotland from Lover. In Ireland, the song debuted at number five, tying Swift's previous single, "Me!", which peaked in the week ending May 3, 2019. In Germany, the song debuted at number 37 on the Official German Charts later peaking at number 36. In the Netherlands, the song debuted at number 28 on the Single Top 100 chart. In Belgium, the song arrived at number 11 on the Belgian Ultratip chart later peaking at number three. In Sweden, the song entered at number 55 on the Sverigetopplistan chart later peaking at number 35. It was less successful in France, where the song debuted at number 154 and spent only one week.

In Australia, the song debuted at number three in the ARIA Charts, becoming the second top three hit from the album in the country. In New Zealand, the song entered the Recorded Music NZ singles chart at number five, becoming Swift's fifteenth top 10 single in the country. The song also topped New Zealand Hot Singles chart.

== Music video ==
=== Background ===
The music video for "You Need to Calm Down" was directed by Swift and Drew Kirsch and executive produced by Swift and Todrick Hall. It was released on June 17, 2019, after a premiere on Good Morning America. The video featured a large number of celebrity cameos, many of whom are LGBT. In order of appearance, the list includes the dancer Giuseppe Giofrè, Dexter Mayfield, the YouTuber Hannah Hart, the actress Laverne Cox, the singer Chester Lockhart, the entertainer Todrick Hall, the singer Hayley Kiyoko, the actor Jesse Tyler Ferguson, the lawyer Justin Mikita, the singer Ciara, the Netflix series Queer Eye's Fab Five (Tan France, Bobby Berk, Karamo Brown, Antoni Porowski, and Jonathan Van Ness), the figure skater Adam Rippon, the singer Adam Lambert, the television personality Ellen DeGeneres, the entertainers Billy Porter and RuPaul, the singer Katy Perry, and the actor Ryan Reynolds. The appearance of Perry serves as an end to a dispute between her and Swift, although both artists had publicly ended the feud several months prior. Numerous drag queens also appear in the video impersonating various female recording artists. Tatianna portrays Ariana Grande, Trinity the Tuck portrays Lady Gaga, Delta Work portrays Adele, Trinity K. Bonet portrays Cardi B, Jade Jolie portrays Swift, Riley Knoxx portrays Beyoncé, Adore Delano portrays Perry and A'keria Chanel Davenport portrays Nicki Minaj. The video was shot in Santa Clarita, California.

=== Synopsis ===
Drag queens impersonating female music artists for a "pop queen pageant" in the music video. From left to right, Tatianna as Ariana Grande, Trinity the Tuck as Lady Gaga, Delta Work as Adele, Trinity K. Bonet as Cardi B, Jade Jolie as Swift, Riley Knoxx (who is transgender, not a drag performer) as Beyoncé, Adore Delano as Katy Perry, and A'keria Davenport as Nicki Minaj.

The video is set in a colorful trailer park. Swift awakens in her trailer, wearing a bathrobe over a swimsuit, with an embroidery containing the Cher quote "Mom, I am a rich man" hanging on a wall. Swift throws her phone onto her bed, which then gives off sparks and starts a fire in the trailer. She nonchalantly walks to a pool, ignoring her burning trailer. She goes into the pool, lying on a float, while looking at the camera and singing. The camera then switches to other residents in the trailer park and their activities, including Mayfield dancing, Hart weightlifting a boombox and Cox watering her yard of plastic flamingoes and greeting Lockhart, who promptly faints.

The scene cuts to Swift walking and dancing down a street with Hall, interspersed with scenes of Kiyoko shooting an arrow into a target with the number "5" (a clue to Swift's next promotional single "The Archer", the fifth track on the album), protesters holding placards with anti-gay slogans (a reference to a real-life religious group that picketed Swift's concerts), Ciara officiating a wedding between Ferguson and Mikita, and Rippon serving snow cones to customers from a stall. Swift also holds a tea party with the Fab Five and Hall. In another trailer, Lambert tattoos the words "Cruel Summer" (later revealed to be a song on the album) onto DeGeneres' right arm. In the next scene, Swift and other residents sun tan while ignoring the heckling protesters, followed by Porter walking down the middle of the two crowds wearing a dress.

The scene shifts to a "pop queen pageant" with the contestants dressed as numerous female singers. RuPaul walks down the lineup with a crown decorated with emeralds and fleur-de-lis motifs, but instead of crowning a winner, he throws it in the air. A food fight begins, with Swift appearing in a french fries costume and Perry in a hamburger suit. The two see and walk towards each other. Elsewhere, Reynolds is portraying Norman Rockwell working on a painting of the Stonewall Inn. Swift and Perry smile, dance and share a hug. A message at the end of the video urges viewers to sign Swift's Change.org petition for the United States Senate to pass the Equality Act.

=== Reception ===
The music video received mixed reviews. It received praise for Swift's activism, while criticism was levelled at the execution, particularly the depiction of the anti-LGBT protesters. Many publications including The New York Times, The Washington Post, CNN, and The Irish Times have noted that the song and music video was Swift's most political move yet. Jon Caramanica from The New York Times applauded the inclusion of LGBT celebrities and drag queens as "a worthy celebration", but also wrote it was "plausible cover". Writing in the same review, Wesley Morris questioned the video's release in June to coincide with Pride Month as "tired, tardy or tidily opportunistic", but concluded the video was "a fine thing". Craig Jenkins of Vulture wrote the song and video "has great intentions", but opened up Swift to accusations of queerbaiting and profiting from Pride Month. Dave Holmes from Esquire praised the celebrity cameos, but noted the "ugly and poorly-educated" look of the protesters and the "sexless" portrayal of gay life.

In an opinion piece for NBC News, Michael Arceneaux agreed that Swift "meant well", but criticized the depiction of the anti-gay protesters as "poorer bumpkins", and that the scene between Swift and Katy Perry detracts from the overall pro-gay message. Spencer Kornhaber from The Atlantic stated that "in real-life, Pride counterprotests feature yet-uglier slogans", and "writing off bigotry as negativity... isn't helpful". Nathan Ma from The Independent wrote the protesters could have included politicians who voted for anti-LGBT legislation.

Some publications and LGBTQ+ personalities have defended Swift. Emma Grey Ellis from Wired wrote "the song has spawned more opinions than it has words", and continued "people claimed to despise Swift's lack of politics, and now she is overtly political and they still hate it." De Elizabeth from InStyle opined "a lack of outright activism allowed Swift to become a punching bag". The actor Brian Jordan Alvarez praised the video in an interview with IndieWire, stating that he is "completely grateful anytime anyone, especially someone with a huge platform, expresses positivity, love, and support for the LGBTQ community." The actor Billy Eichner praised Swift's activism, saying "[the LGBT community needs] all the allies we can get." The fashion designer and television personality Tan France, who appeared in the video, called Swift a "powerful ally" and remarked that while LGBT people are often encouraged to take their time to come out, the same is not extended to allies.

== Accolades ==
The song was nominated for nine awards at the 2019 MTV Video Music Awards, including the category Video of the Year, becoming the most nominated video of the night. It is also Swift's second victory for Video of the Year following "Bad Blood" in 2015, joining Beyoncé and Rihanna as the only female acts to win the category twice and the fourth artist overall. It also won Video for Good. The song was nominated for Best Pop Solo Performance at the 62nd Annual Grammy Awards, becoming her third nod in the category, following "Shake It Off" (2015) and "Blank Space" (2016).

Award and nominations for "You Need to Calm Down"
Year	Organization	Award	Result	Ref.
2019	Teen Choice Awards	Choice Summer Song	Nominated	
2019	MTV Video Music Awards	Video of the Year	Won	
2019	MTV Video Music Awards	Song of the Year	Nominated	
2019	MTV Video Music Awards	Video for Good	Won	
2019	MTV Video Music Awards	Best Pop	Nominated	
2019	MTV Video Music Awards	Best Direction	Nominated	
2019	MTV Video Music Awards	Best Art Direction	Nominated	
2019	MTV Video Music Awards	Best Editing	Nominated	
2019	MTV Video Music Awards	Best Power Anthem	Nominated	
2019	MTV Video Music Awards	Song of Summer	Nominated	
2019	American Music Awards	Favorite Music Video	Won	
2019	Telehit Awards	Best English Video	Nominated	
2019	Telehit Awards	People's Best Video	Nominated	
2020	Grammy Award	Best Pop Solo Performance	Nominated	
2020	iHeartRadio Music Awards	Best Lyrics	Nominated	
2020	Queerty Awards	Anthem	Runner-up	
2020	Nickelodeon Kids' Choice Awards	Favorite Song	Nominated	
2020	Berlin Music Video Awards	Best Cinematography	Nominated	
2020	BMI Pop Awards	Award-winning Song	Won	
2020	BMI Pop Awards	Publisher of the Year (Sony/ATV)	Won	

== Impact ==
On June 1, 2019, Swift initiated a petition on Change.org, titled "Support the Equality Act", in favor of the United States Senate's support in passing the pro-LGBT "Equality Act" in the country's Congress; the act bans discrimination "on the basis of the sex, sexual orientation, gender identity, or pregnancy, childbirth, or a related medical condition of an individual, as well as because of sex-based stereotypes". A message urging the viewers to sign the petition appears at the end of the "You Need to Calm Down" music video; it states: "Let's show our pride by demanding that, on a national level, our laws truly treat all of our citizens equally. Please sign my petition for Senate support of the Equality Act on Change.org". As of April 12, 2020, the petition had over 704,000 signatures, including those from Democratic senators and presidential candidates like Elizabeth Warren, Amy Klobuchar, Ed Markey, Kirsten Gillibrand, Tim Kaine, Cory Brooker and Beto O'Rourke. Swift also addressed a letter to Republican senator Lamar Alexander of Tennessee, her home state, asking him and the other senators to support the act: "For American citizens to be denied jobs or housing based on who they love or how they identify is un-American and cruel".

The release of "You Need to Calm Down" further led to a spike in individual donations to GLAAD, an American LGBT non-governmental organization, as the lyrics of the song namechecks the organization: "why are you mad when you could be GLAAD?". In response, GLAAD started a Facebook fundraiser for fans to support the advocacy work for Pride Month, with $1300 as a goal since 13 is Swift's lucky number. Anthony Ramos, Director of Talent Management at GLAAD, stated that Swift "is one of the world's biggest pop stars; the fact that she continues to use her platform and music to support the LGBTQ community and the Equality Act is a true sign of being an ally. 'You Need to Calm Down' is the perfect Pride anthem, and we're thrilled to see Taylor standing with the LGBTQ community to promote inclusivity, equality, and acceptance this Pride month". Ramos also highlighted that many of the individual donations were made in the amount of $13. Sarah Kate, the CEO and President of GLAAD, stated: "Taylor Swift continues to use her platform to speak out against discrimination and create a world where everyone can live the life they love. GLAAD is so thankful for her donation to support our advocacy efforts and for her ongoing work to speak out for what is fair, just, and LGBTQ inclusive. In today's divisive political and cultural climate, we need more allies like Taylor, who send positive and uplifting messages to LGBTQ people everywhere".

I just want to say that this is a fan-voted award, so I first want to say thank you to the fans, because in this video several points were made, so you voting for this video means that you want a world, where we're all treated equally under the law, regardless of who we love, regardless of how we identify. At the end of this video, there was a petition and there still is a petition for the Equality Act, which basically just says we all deserve equal rights under the law. I want to thank everyone who signed that petition because it now has a half a million signatures, which is five times the amount that it would need to warrant a response from the White House.

— Swift, in her Video of the Year speech at the 2019 MTV Video Music Awards.

On August 26, 2019, Swift won the Video of the Year award for the "You Need to Calm Down" music video at the 2019 MTV Video Music Awards; in her speech, Swift urged the audience and the viewers to sign her petition, and pointed out that the White House has not responded to the petition despite having "five times the amount of signatures that it would need to warrant a response". The televised speech led to a surge in the number of signatures on the petition. The next day, the White House issued a statement. Judd Deere, the White House deputy Press Secretary, stated that "the Trump administration absolutely opposes discrimination of any kind and supports the equal treatment of all; however, the House-passed bill in its current form is filled with poison pills that threaten to undermine parental and conscience rights". "You Need to Calm Down" went on to become a gay anthem.

== Live performances, covers and usage in media ==
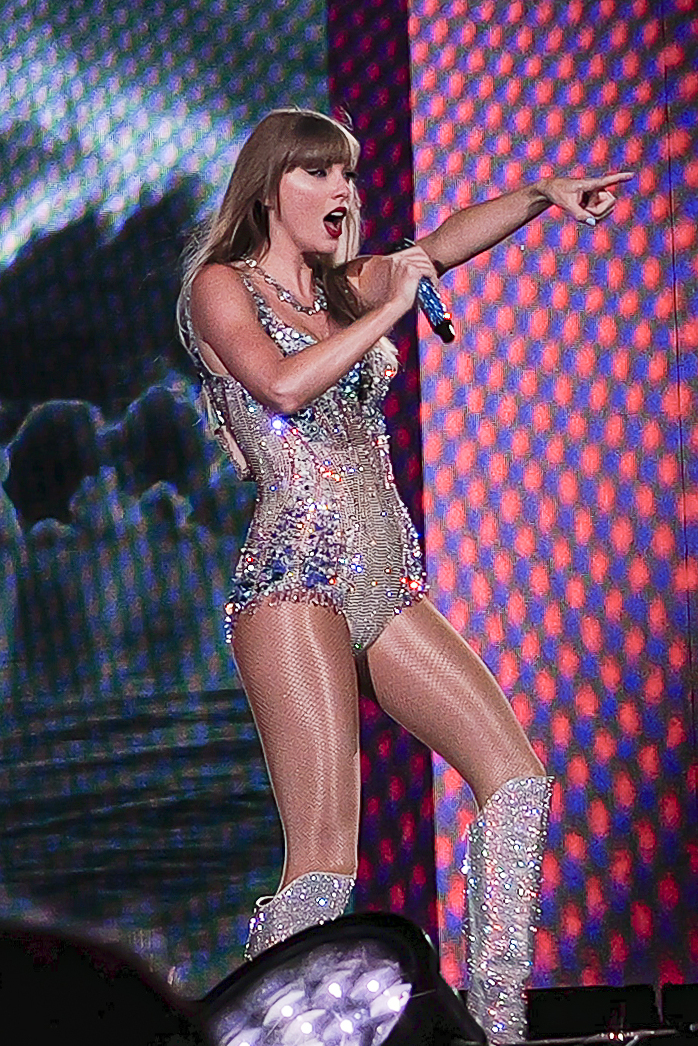
Swift performed "You Need to Calm Down" on the Eras Tour in 2023 and 2024.

Swift performed the song live for the first time at the Amazon Prime Day Concert on July 10, 2019. On August 22, she performed the song at a Good Morning America concert in Central Park. The next day, she performed an acoustic rendition of the song at a SiriusXM Town Hall. She also performed it at the 2019 MTV Video Music Awards along with "Lover" and included the song in her setlist for BBC Radio 1's Live Lounge on September 2. On September 9, Swift performed the song at the City of Lover one-off concert in Paris, France; this concert live version was released to digital music and music streaming platforms on May 17, 2020.

While promoting Lover, Swift performed the song at the We Can Survive charity concert in Los Angeles on October 19, at the Alibaba Singles' Day Gala in Shanghai, China on November 10, at Capital FM's Jingle Bell Ball 2019 in London on December 8, and at iHeartRadio Z100's Jingle Ball in New York City on December 13. Swift included "You Need to Calm Down" on the set list of her sixth headlining concert tour, the Eras Tour (2023–2024) with the first verse being omitted.

British rock band Yonaka covered the song for their Spotify Singles edition in August 2019. American singer-songwriter Kelly Clarkson covered the song in an episode of her television show, The Kelly Clarkson Show, to commemorate the 2020 Pride Month. "You Need to Calm Down" was featured in a commercial for Amazon Music. In June 2021, as part of a project on human rights, students of Barking and Dagenham College made a video to "You Need to Calm Down" for Pride Month. The song was used in a commercial Swift narrated for the United States women's national soccer team competing at the 2020 Summer Olympics.

== Credits and personnel ==
Credits adapted from the liner notes of Lover

- Taylor Swift – vocals, songwriter, producer
- Joel Little – producer, songwriter, drum programmer, keyboard, recording engineer
- Şerban Ghenea – mixer
- John Hanes – mix engineer

== Charts ==
=== Weekly charts ===
Chart performance for "You Need to Calm Down"
Chart (2019–2020)	Peak position
Argentina (Argentina Hot 100)	71
Australia (ARIA)	3
Austria (Ö3 Austria Top 40)	21
Belgium (Ultratip Bubbling Under Flanders)	2
Belgium (Ultratip Bubbling Under Wallonia)	18
Bolivia (Monitor Latino)	19
Canada Hot 100 (Billboard)	4
Canada AC (Billboard)	4
Canada CHR/Top 40 (Billboard)	7
Canada Hot Ac (Billboard)	3
China Airplay/FL (Billboard)	1
Croatia (HRT)	19
CIS Airplay (TopHit)	95
Colombia (National-Report)	69
Czech Republic Singles Digital (ČNS IFPI)	8
Denmark Airplay (Tracklisten)	14
Ecuador (National-Report)	91
Estonia (Eesti Ekspress)	8
Euro Digital Song Sales (Billboard)	3
Finland Airplay (Radiosoittolista)	86
France (SNEP)	154
Germany (GfK)	36
Germany Airplay (BVMI)	14
Greece International (IFPI)	6
Hungary (Single Top 40)	3
Hungary (Stream Top 40)	8
Iceland (Tónlistinn)	20
Ireland (IRMA)	5
Israel (Media Forest)	18
Italy (FIMI)	69
Japan (Japan Hot 100)	23
Latvia (LAIPA)	8
Lebanon (OLT20 Combined Chart)	5
Lithuania (AGATA)	8
Malaysia (RIM)	3
Mexico Ingles Airplay (Billboard)	1
Netherlands (Dutch Top 40)	26
Netherlands (Single Top 100)	28
New Zealand (Recorded Music NZ)	5
Nicaragua (Monitor Latino)	14
Norway (VG-lista)	22
Portugal (AFP)	27
Romania (Airplay 100)	70
Scottish Singles Sales (Official Charts)	1
Singapore (RIAS)	7
Slovakia Airplay (ČNS IFPI)	22
Slovakia Singles Digital (ČNS IFPI)	8
Slovenia (SloTop50)	36
Spain (Promusicae)	63
Spain Airplay (Promusicae)	20
Sweden (Sverigetopplistan)	35
Switzerland (Schweizer Hitparade)	22
UK Singles (Official Charts)	5
US Billboard Hot 100	2
US Adult Contemporary (Billboard)	11
US Adult Pop Airplay (Billboard)	3
US Dance Airplay (Billboard)	16
US Dance Club Songs (Billboard)	50
US Pop Airplay (Billboard)	9
US Rolling Stone Top 100	3

=== Year-end charts ===
Year-end chart performance for "You Need to Calm Down"
Chart (2019)	Position
Australia (ARIA)	61
Canada (Canadian Hot 100)	28
US Billboard Hot 100	39
US Adult Contemporary (Billboard)	36
US Adult Top 40 (Billboard)	17
US Mainstream Top 40 (Billboard)	34
US Rolling Stone Top 100	47

Chart (2020)	Position
US Adult Contemporary (Billboard)	36

== Certifications ==
Certifications for "You Need to Calm Down"
Region	Certification	Certified units/sales
Australia (ARIA)	7× Platinum	490,000^{‡}
Austria (IFPI Austria)	Platinum	30,000^{‡}
Brazil (Pro-Música Brasil)	Diamond	160,000^{‡}
Denmark (IFPI Danmark)	Gold	45,000^{‡}
France (SNEP)	Gold	100,000^{‡}
Germany (BVMI)	Gold	300,000^{‡}
Italy (FIMI)	Gold	50,000^{‡}
New Zealand (RMNZ)	3× Platinum	90,000^{‡}
Norway (IFPI Norway)	Platinum	60,000^{‡}
Poland (ZPAV)	Platinum	50,000^{‡}
Portugal (AFP)	Gold	5,000^{‡}
Spain (Promusicae)	Platinum	60,000^{‡}
United Kingdom (BPI)	2× Platinum	1,200,000^{‡}
United States (RIAA)	3× Platinum	3,000,000^{‡}
^{‡} Sales+streaming figures based on certification alone.

== Release history ==
Release formats for "You Need to Calm Down"
Region	Date	Format(s)	Version	Label	Ref.
Various	June 14, 2019	Digital download; streaming	Original	Republic	
Italy	June 17, 2019	Radio airplay	Original	Universal	
United States	June 18, 2019	Contemporary hit radio	Original	Republic	
Various	August 20, 2019	Digital download; streaming	Clean Bandit remix	Republic	
Various	May 17, 2020	Digital download; streaming	Live	Republic	

== See also ==
- List of Billboard Hot 100 top-ten singles in 2019
- List of number-one digital songs of 2019 (U.S.)
- List of number one singles in Scotland (2019)
- List of UK top-ten singles in 2019
- List of top 10 singles in 2019 (Australia)
