= List of number-one singles of 2019 (Ireland) =

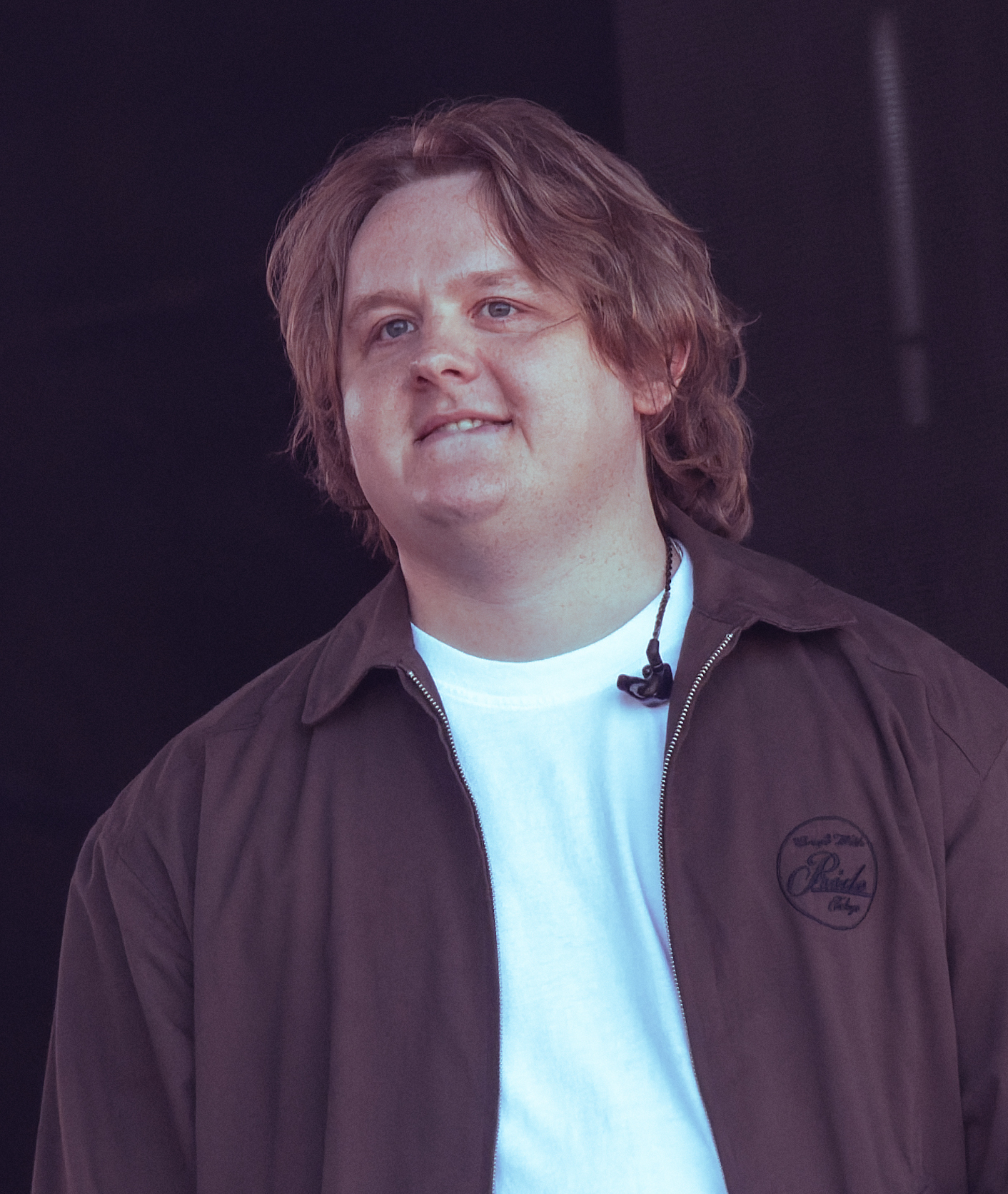
Lewis Capaldi had three number ones this year.

The Irish Singles Chart ranks the best-performing singles in Ireland, as compiled by the Official Charts Company on behalf of the Irish Recorded Music Association.

Issue date	Song	Artist(s)	Reference
4 January	"Sweet but Psycho"	Ava Max	
11 January	"Sweet but Psycho"	Ava Max	
18 January	"Sweet but Psycho"	Ava Max	
25 January	"7 Rings"	Ariana Grande	
1 February	"7 Rings"	Ariana Grande	
8 February	"7 Rings"	Ariana Grande	
15 February	"Break Up with Your Girlfriend, I'm Bored"	Ariana Grande	
22 February	"7 Rings"	Ariana Grande	
1 March	"Someone You Loved"	Lewis Capaldi	
8 March	"Someone You Loved"	Lewis Capaldi	
15 March	"Someone You Loved"	Lewis Capaldi	
22 March	"Someone You Loved"	Lewis Capaldi	
29 March	"Someone You Loved"	Lewis Capaldi	
5 April	"Someone You Loved"	Lewis Capaldi	
12 April	"Old Town Road"	Lil Nas X	
19 April	"Old Town Road"	Lil Nas X	
26 April	"Old Town Road"	Lil Nas X	
3 May	"Old Town Road"	Lil Nas X	
10 May	"Hold Me While You Wait"	Lewis Capaldi	
17 May	"I Don't Care"	Ed Sheeran and Justin Bieber	
24 May	"I Don't Care"	Ed Sheeran and Justin Bieber	
31 May	"I Don't Care"	Ed Sheeran and Justin Bieber	
7 June	"I Don't Care"	Ed Sheeran and Justin Bieber	
14 June	"I Don't Care"	Ed Sheeran and Justin Bieber	
21 June	"I Don't Care"	Ed Sheeran and Justin Bieber	
28 June	"Señorita"	Shawn Mendes and Camila Cabello	
5 July	"Señorita"	Shawn Mendes and Camila Cabello	
12 July	"Señorita"	Shawn Mendes and Camila Cabello	
19 July	"Señorita"	Shawn Mendes and Camila Cabello	
26 July	"Señorita"	Shawn Mendes and Camila Cabello	
2 August	"Señorita"	Shawn Mendes and Camila Cabello	
9 August	"Señorita"	Shawn Mendes and Camila Cabello	
16 August	"Señorita"	Shawn Mendes and Camila Cabello	
23 August	"Señorita"	Shawn Mendes and Camila Cabello	
30 August	"Dance Monkey"	Tones and I	
6 September	"Dance Monkey"	Tones and I	
13 September	"Dance Monkey"	Tones and I	
20 September	"Dance Monkey"	Tones and I	
27 September	"Dance Monkey"	Tones and I	
4 October	"Dance Monkey"	Tones and I	
11 October	"Dance Monkey"	Tones and I	
18 October	"Dance Monkey"	Tones and I	
25 October	"Ride It"	Regard	
1 November	"Lose You to Love Me"	Selena Gomez	
8 November	"Don't Start Now"	Dua Lipa	
15 November	"Don't Start Now"	Dua Lipa	
22 November	"Everything I Wanted"	Billie Eilish	
29 November	"Before You Go"	Lewis Capaldi	
6 December	"Before You Go"	Lewis Capaldi	
13 December	"Before You Go"	Lewis Capaldi	
20 December	"Before You Go"	Lewis Capaldi	
27 December	"Before You Go"	Lewis Capaldi	

== Number-one artists ==
Position	Artist	Weeks at No. 1
1	Lewis Capaldi	12
2	Shawn Mendes	9
2	Camila Cabello	9
4	Tones and I	8
5	Ed Sheeran	6
5	Justin Bieber	6
7	Ariana Grande	5
8	Lil Nas X	4
9	Ava Max	3
10	Dua Lipa	2
11	Regard	1
11	Selena Gomez	1
11	Billie Eilish	1
