= Lose You to Love Me =

2019 single by Selena Gomez

Single by Selena Gomez

from the album Rare
- B-side: "Look at Her Now"
- Released: October 23, 2019
- Recorded: August 2019: Costa Mesa Recording Studios (Newport, California); Interscope Studios (Santa Monica); Westlake Studios (West Hollywood, California); Chalice Recording (Hollywood, California); MXM (Los Angeles, California); House Mouse Studios (Stockholm, Sweden)
- Genre: Pop
- Length: 3:26
- Label: Interscope
- Songwriters: Selena Gomez; Julia Michaels; Justin Tranter; Mattias Larsson; Robin Fredriksson
- Producers: Mattman & Robin; Finneas

Selena Gomez singles chronology
"I Can't Get Enough" (2019)	"Lose You to Love Me" (2019)	"Rare" (2020)

Music video
- "Lose You to Love Me" on YouTube

"Lose You to Love Me" is a song by American singer Selena Gomez, released by Interscope Records on October 23, 2019, as the lead single from Gomez's third studio album, Rare (2020). The song was written by Gomez, Julia Michaels, Justin Tranter, and its producers Mattman & Robin. It was also co-produced by Finneas O'Connell. "Lose You to Love Me" is a pop ballad with empowering lyrics about discovering one's true self, backed by a choir, piano and strings.

"Lose You to Love Me" received widespread acclaim from music critics, who mostly complimented its lyrical content. "Lose You to Love Me" topped the Billboard Hot 100, becoming Gomez's first number one song on the chart. Outside of the United States, "Lose You to Love Me" topped the charts in Canada and the Republic of Ireland, and peaked within the top ten of the charts in many countries, including Australia, Belgium, Germany, Malaysia, the Netherlands, New Zealand, Norway, Singapore, Sweden, Switzerland, and the United Kingdom. The song has attained several gold, platinum and multi-platinum certifications worldwide.

The accompanying music video premiered on YouTube coinciding with the song's release. It is a simplistic black-and-white video directed by Sophie Muller and filmed entirely on an iPhone 11 Pro in Los Angeles. It features Gomez singing straight to the camera, in a confessional. Gomez made the debut performance of the song at the 2019 American Music Awards on November 24, 2019, where she opened the show. "Lose You to Love Me" was listed as one of the best songs of 2019 by Vulture and Billboard.

A demo version of the song was released on October 2, 2020, to celebrate the song's first anniversary. The song was featured in the TV series Hacks, as well as in 2021 Amazon Prime Video movie Encounter.

== Background ==
Gomez revealed in April 2019 that she was working on new music. After teasing her fans on Instagram with pictures of her as a child and as an adult, she announced on October 18, that a single titled "Lose You to Love Me" would be released on October 23. In an interview with Zane Lowe on his Beats1 Radio show, co-writer Julia Michaels revealed that the song was written on Valentine's Day of 2019. In the documentary Selena Gomez: My Mind & Me, Gomez revealed the song was written in 45 minutes making it the fastest song of hers ever to be written.

== Composition and lyrical interpretation ==
"Lose You to Love Me" is a pop ballad and self-love anthem about discovering someone's true self through the difficult process of losing a lover. Chris Monlanpy from Slate stated "with only piano and Gomez's voice, then grows ever more stirring with plucked strings, a choir of backing vocals, and, more than halfway through, a subtle heartbeat thump that's the closest thing to a beat in the whole song."

== Commercial performance ==
The song debuted at number 15 on the US Billboard Hot 100 with 36,000 copies sold in its opening week after just two days of tracking. It debuted at number one on the Digital Songs chart and number 20 on the Streaming Songs chart. The song's number fifteen debut is also Gomez's second best debut on the Hot 100 chart after "Good for You" debuted at number nine in 2015. In its second week, the song ascended to number one, becoming Gomez's first number-one song on the Hot 100 and her highest-charting single in the US, surpassing the number five peaks of "Good for You" and "Same Old Love". It also became her eighth top ten hit on the chart. The song led Billboard's Streaming Songs chart, accumulating 38 million US streams in one week. It also became the best-selling song of the week digitally, topping Billboard's Digital Songs chart.

In the United Kingdom, "Lose You to Love Me" debuted at number 65 on the UK Singles Chart on October 25, 2019 – for the week ending date October 31, 2019 – climbing to its peak position of number three on the chart the following week, becoming Gomez's highest charting position in Britain.

In the Republic of Ireland, "Lose You to Love Me" peaked at the top the Irish Singles Chart, becoming Gomez's first number one song in the Irish Republic.

== Music video ==
The black-and-white music video was directed by Sophie Muller and filmed entirely on an iPhone 11 Pro in Los Angeles. It features Gomez singing straight to the camera, in a confessional. The video premiered on YouTube on October 22, 2019, coinciding with the song's release. The video has since amassed over 530 million views and 9.1 Million Likes. On January 14, 2020, an alternative music video was released on her YouTube channel, as well as an alternative music video for "Look at Her Now".

== Live performances ==
Gomez first performed the song as the opening number of the 2019 American Music Awards on November 24, 2019, along with "Look at Her Now".

== Critical reception ==
"Lose You to Love Me" received widespread critical acclaim. Writing for Vogue, Michelle Ruiz commended the song, stating, "Potentially getting lost in the internet sleuthing of it all, however, is the fact that "Lose You to Love Me" is a highly catchy and searing ballad that deserves to immediately be added to everyone's Empowering Breakup Songs playlist, right after Lizzo's 'Truth Hurts'." Craig Jenkins of Vulture praised its lyrics, noting: "It was a gamble trusting that the lyrics to this song would sell it on their own, but it was a wise one." Vulture also named it the second best song of 2019.

=== Year-end lists ===
Publication	List	Rank	Ref.
Billboard	55 Break-up Songs of All Time of 2023	54	
Insider	50 Best Break-up Songs of the 21st Century of 2022	45	

== Awards and nominations ==
Year	Organization	Award	Result	Ref.
2020	iHeartRadio Music Awards	Best Lyrics	Nominated	
2021	ASCAP Pop Music Awards	Award Winning Song	Won	
2021	ASCAP Pop Music Awards	Publisher of the Year (Warner Music)	Won	
2021	Musikförläggarnas pris	Song of the Year	Nominated	

== Track listing ==
- Digital download
1. "Lose You to Love Me" – 3:26
- Digital download (Demo Version)
1. "Lose You to Love Me" (Demo Version) – 3:39

== Credits and personnel ==
Credits adapted from the liner notes of Rare.

=== Recording locations ===
- Assisted at Westlake Recording Studios (Los Angeles) and Interscope Studios (Santa Monica, California)
- Mixed at MixStar Studios (Virginia Beach, Virginia)
- Demo tracked at MXM Studios (Los Angeles)
- Recorded and tracked at Costa Mesa Recording Studios (Newport, California), Interscope Studios (Santa Monica, California), Westlake Recording Studios (Los Angeles, California), Chalice Recording Studios (Los Angeles, California), MXM Studios (Los Angeles) and House Mouse Studios (Stockholm)
- Strings recorded and edited at The Calm Studio (Jonstorp, Sweden)
- Mastered at Sterling Sound (Edgewater, New Jersey)

=== Personnel ===
- Selena Gomez – vocals, songwriter
- Julia Michaels – songwriter, backing vocals, choir vocals
- Justin Tranter – songwriter, backing vocals, choir vocals
- Mattman & Robin – songwriter, producer, vocal producer, backing vocals, choir vocals, bass guitar, organ, percussion, piano, strings, synthesizer programming
- Finneas O'Connell – additional producer
- Mattias Bylund – string arranger, recorder and editor, strings
- Mattias Johansson – violin
- David Bukovinszky – cello
- Bart Schoudel – engineer, vocal producer
- Ryan Dulude – assistant recording engineer
- Gavin Finn – assistant recording engineer
- Chris Gehringer – mastering engineer
- John Hanes – mix engineer
- Serban Ghenea – mixer
- Chris Gehringer – mastering
- Will Quinnell – mastering

== Charts ==
=== Weekly charts ===
Weekly chart performance
Chart (2019–2020)	Peak position
Argentina (Argentina Hot 100)	60
Australia (ARIA)	2
Austria (Ö3 Austria Top 40)	3
Belgium (Ultratop 50 Flanders)	7
Belgium (Ultratop 50 Wallonia)	27
Bolivia (Monitor Latino)	18
Canada Hot 100 (Billboard)	1
Canada AC (Billboard)	5
Canada CHR/Top 40 (Billboard)	3
Canada Hot AC (Billboard)	3
CIS Airplay (TopHit)	84
Costa Rica (Monitor Latino)	16
Croatia (HRT)	18
Czech Republic Singles Digital (ČNS IFPI)	2
Denmark (Tracklisten)	8
Dominican Republic (SODINPRO)	44
Ecuador (National-Report)	91
Estonia (Eesti Ekspress)	2
Euro Digital Songs (Billboard)	1
Finland (Suomen virallinen lista)	6
France (SNEP)	32
Germany (GfK)	7
Greece (IFPI)	2
Guatemala (Monitor Latino)	19
Hungary (Rádiós Top 40)	37
Hungary (Single Top 40)	4
Hungary (Stream Top 40)	2
Iceland (Tónlistinn)	9
Ireland (IRMA)	1
Italy (FIMI)	24
Japan (Japan Hot 100)	72
Latvia (LAIPA)	2
Lithuania (AGATA)	2
Lebanon (Lebanese Top 20)	8
Lebanon English (Lebanese Top 20)	5
Malaysia (RIM)	2
Mexico (Mexico Airplay)	7
Mexico Ingles Airplay (Billboard)	7
Netherlands (Dutch Top 40)	8
Netherlands (Single Top 100)	10
New Zealand (Recorded Music NZ)	2
Norway (VG-lista)	2
Panama (Monitor Latino)	14
Portugal (AFP)	4
Scotland Singles (Official Charts)	10
Singapore (RIAS)	2
Slovakia Airplay (ČNS IFPI)	20
Slovakia Singles Digital (ČNS IFPI)	2
Slovenia (SloTop50)	24
South Korea (Gaon)	87
Spain (Promusicae)	19
Sweden (Sverigetopplistan)	6
Switzerland (Schweizer Hitparade)	2
UK Singles (Official Charts)	3
US Billboard Hot 100	1
US Adult Contemporary (Billboard)	13
US Adult Pop Airplay (Billboard)	3
US Dance Airplay (Billboard)	8
US Pop Airplay (Billboard)	2

=== Year-end charts ===
Year-end chart performance
Chart (2019)	Position
Austria (Ö3 Austria Top 40)	75
Hungary (Single Top 40)	75
Netherlands (Dutch Top 40)	73

Year-end chart performance
Chart (2020)	Position
Belgium (Ultratop Flanders)	52
Canada (Canadian Hot 100)	38
Hungary (Stream Top 40)	98
Iceland (Tónlistinn)	49
Portugal (AFP)	140
UK Singles (OCC)	89
US Billboard Hot 100	30
US Adult Contemporary (Billboard)	27
US Adult Top 40 (Billboard)	13
US Dance/Mix Show Airplay (Billboard)	45
US Mainstream Top 40 (Billboard)	15

== Certifications and sales ==
Region	Certification	Certified units/sales
Australia (ARIA)	5× Platinum	350,000^{‡}
Austria (IFPI Austria)	Platinum	30,000^{‡}
Belgium (BRMA)	Gold	20,000^{‡}
Brazil (Pro-Música Brasil)	Diamond	160,000^{‡}
Canada (Music Canada)	5× Platinum	400,000^{‡}
Denmark (IFPI Danmark)	Platinum	90,000^{‡}
France (SNEP)	Gold	100,000^{‡}
Germany (BVMI)	Gold	200,000^{‡}
Italy (FIMI)	Gold	35,000^{‡}
New Zealand (RMNZ)	3× Platinum	90,000^{‡}
Norway (IFPI Norway)	2× Platinum	120,000^{‡}
Poland (ZPAV)	2× Platinum	100,000^{‡}
Portugal (AFP)	Platinum	10,000^{‡}
Spain (Promusicae)	Platinum	60,000^{‡}
United Kingdom (BPI)	2× Platinum	1,200,000^{‡}
United States (RIAA)	3× Platinum	3,000,000^{‡}
Streaming
Sweden (GLF)	Platinum	8,000,000^{†}
^{‡} Sales+streaming figures based on certification alone.^{†} Streaming-only figures based on certification alone.

== Release history ==
Release formats for "Lose You to Love Me"
Country	Date	Format	Label	Ref.
Various	October 23, 2019	Digital download; streaming; 12-inch vinyl	Interscope	
Australia	October 25, 2019	Contemporary hit radio	Universal	
United Kingdom	October 26, 2019	Contemporary hit radio	Polydor	
United States	October 28, 2019	Hot adult contemporary	Interscope	
United States	October 29, 2019	Contemporary hit radio	Interscope	
Italy	November 8, 2019	Contemporary hit radio	Universal	

== See also ==
- List of Billboard Hot 100 number-one singles of 2019
- List of number-one Billboard Streaming Songs of 2019
- List of Rolling Stone Top 100 number-one songs of 2019
- List of number-one digital songs of 2019 (U.S.)
- List of Canadian Hot 100 number-one singles of 2019
- List of top 10 singles in 2019 (Australia)
- List of UK top-ten singles in 2019
- List of number-one singles of 2019 (Ireland)
