= List of Billboard Streaming Songs number ones of 2019 =

This is a list of songs that reached number one on the Billboard magazine Streaming Songs chart in 2019.

== Chart history ==
Key
†	Indicates best-charting streaming song of 2019

Issue date	Song	Artist(s)	Weekly streams
January 5	"All I Want for Christmas Is You"	Mariah Carey	51.9 million
January 12	"Sicko Mode"	Travis Scott	43.1 million
January 19	"Sunflower"	Post Malone and Swae Lee	47.6 million
January 26	"Sunflower"	Post Malone and Swae Lee	52.8 million
February 2	"7 Rings"	Ariana Grande	85.3 million
February 9	"7 Rings"	Ariana Grande	63.2 million
February 16	"7 Rings"	Ariana Grande	57.7 million
February 23	"7 Rings"	Ariana Grande	63.5 million
March 2	"7 Rings"	Ariana Grande	44.5 million
March 9	"7 Rings"	Ariana Grande	43.9 million
March 16	"Sucker"	Jonas Brothers	43.7 million
March 23	"7 Rings"	Ariana Grande	36.9 million
March 30	"7 Rings"	Ariana Grande	36.6 million
April 6	"Sunflower"	Post Malone and Swae Lee	38.7 million
April 13	"Old Town Road" †	Lil Nas X	46.6 million
April 20	"Old Town Road" †	Lil Nas X featuring Billy Ray Cyrus	143 million
April 27	"Old Town Road" †	Lil Nas X featuring Billy Ray Cyrus	125.2 million
May 4	"Old Town Road" †	Lil Nas X featuring Billy Ray Cyrus	114.4 million
May 11	"Old Town Road" †	Lil Nas X featuring Billy Ray Cyrus	104 million
May 18	"Old Town Road" †	Lil Nas X featuring Billy Ray Cyrus	104.1 million
May 25	"Old Town Road" †	Lil Nas X featuring Billy Ray Cyrus	103.1 million
June 1	"Old Town Road" †	Lil Nas X featuring Billy Ray Cyrus	130.7 million
June 8	"Old Town Road" †	Lil Nas X featuring Billy Ray Cyrus	115.3 million
June 15	"Old Town Road" †	Lil Nas X featuring Billy Ray Cyrus	115.6 million
June 22	"Old Town Road" †	Lil Nas X featuring Billy Ray Cyrus	100 million
June 29	"Old Town Road" †	Lil Nas X featuring Billy Ray Cyrus	91.6 million
July 6	"Old Town Road" †	Lil Nas X featuring Billy Ray Cyrus	88.7 million
July 13	"Old Town Road" †	Lil Nas X featuring Billy Ray Cyrus	89.3 million
July 20	"Old Town Road" †	Lil Nas X featuring Billy Ray Cyrus	70.5 million
July 27	"Old Town Road" †	Lil Nas X featuring Billy Ray Cyrus	86.2 million
August 3	"Old Town Road" †	Lil Nas X featuring Billy Ray Cyrus	72.5 million
August 10	"Old Town Road" †	Lil Nas X featuring Billy Ray Cyrus	67.4 million
August 17	"Old Town Road" †	Lil Nas X featuring Billy Ray Cyrus	58.8 million
August 24	"Old Town Road" †	Lil Nas X featuring Billy Ray Cyrus	53.1 million
August 31	"Ransom"	Lil Tecca	52.3 million
September 7	"Ransom"	Lil Tecca	49.7 million
September 14	"Ransom"	Lil Tecca	49.4 million
September 21	"Ransom"	Lil Tecca	46.7 million
September 28	"Ransom"	Lil Tecca	45 million
October 5	"Ransom"	Lil Tecca	45.8 million
October 12	"Ransom"	Lil Tecca	43.1 million
October 19	"Highest in the Room"	Travis Scott	59 million
October 26	"Highest in the Room"	Travis Scott	37.2 million
November 2	"Highest in the Room"	Travis Scott	33.8 million
November 9	"Lose You to Love Me"	Selena Gomez	38.8 million
November 16	"Bandit"	Juice Wrld and YoungBoy Never Broke Again	
November 23	"Woah"	Lil Baby	24 million
November 30	"Roxanne"	Arizona Zervas	29.9 million
December 7	"Roxanne"	Arizona Zervas	36.6 million
December 14	"All I Want for Christmas Is You"	Mariah Carey	35.1 million
December 21	"All I Want for Christmas Is You"	Mariah Carey	45.6 million
December 28	"All I Want for Christmas Is You"	Mariah Carey	54.4 million

== See also ==
- 2019 in American music
- List of Billboard Hot 100 number-one singles of 2019
