= List of Billboard Hot 100 number ones of 2019 =

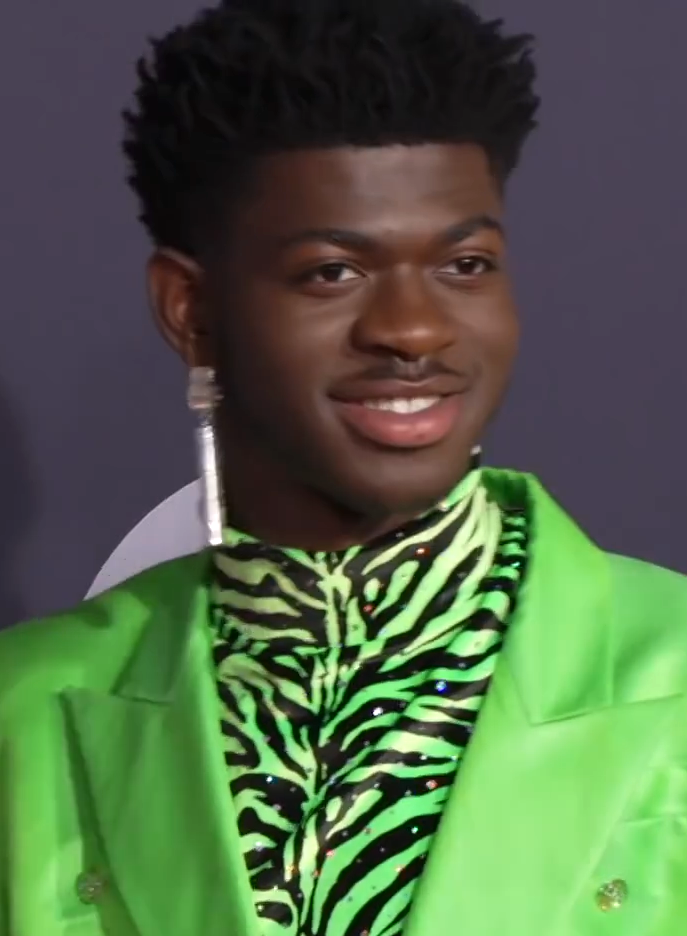
"Old Town Road" by Lil Nas X spent nineteen weeks at number one on the Billboard Hot 100, breaking Mariah Carey’s record for the longest-running number-one song in the chart's history, and ranked as the best-performing single of the year.

The Billboard Hot 100 is a chart that ranks the best-performing songs in the United States. Its data, published by Billboard magazine and compiled by Nielsen SoundScan, is based collectively on each song's weekly physical and digital sales, as well as the amount of airplay received on American radio stations and streaming on online digital music outlets.

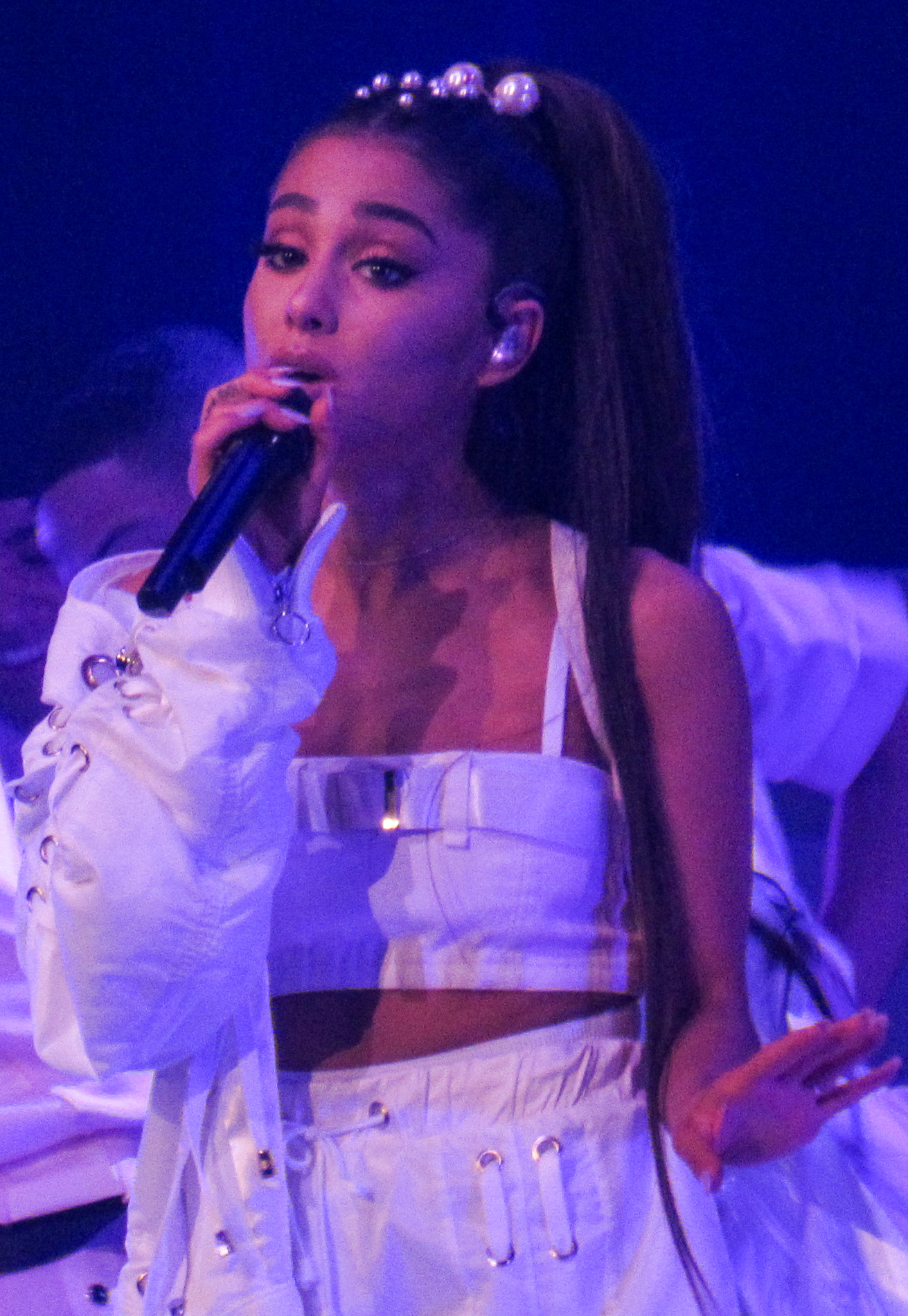
Ariana Grande topped the chart for nine weeks with "Thank U, Next" and "7 Rings".

During 2019, fifteen singles reached number one on the Hot 100; a sixteenth single, "Thank U, Next" by Ariana Grande, began its run at number one in November 2018. Of those fifteen number-one singles, four were collaborations. In total, eighteen acts topped the chart as either lead or featured artists, with ten—Swae Lee (as a solo artist), Bradley Cooper, Jonas Brothers, Lil Nas X, Billy Ray Cyrus, Billie Eilish, Shawn Mendes, Lizzo, Lewis Capaldi, and Selena Gomez—achieving their first Hot 100 number-one single.

Lil Nas X's "Old Town Road" was the longest-running number-one of the year, leading the chart for nineteen weeks (one for the song's original version, credited solely to Lil Nas X, and eighteen for a remix featuring Billy Ray Cyrus); in doing so, it broke the record as the longest-running number one single in Billboard history - a record previously held by the sixteen-week runs of both "One Sweet Day" by Mariah Carey and Boyz II Men (1995–96), and "Despacito" by Luis Fonsi and Daddy Yankee featuring Justin Bieber (2017). It also topped the Billboard Year-End Hot 100 ranking as the best-performing single of 2019. In December, Mariah Carey's "All I Want for Christmas Is You" hit number one for the first time 25 years after its debut in 1994, breaking the record for longest climb to the top spot of the Hot 100 since release. It became her 19th number-one single, extending her own record for most number ones among soloists on the Hot 100. It was also the first Christmas song to top the Hot 100 since "The Chipmunk Song" by David Seville and the Chipmunks in 1958–59. Post Malone and Ariana Grande were the only acts to have multiple number-one songs in 2019, with two apiece.

== Chart history ==
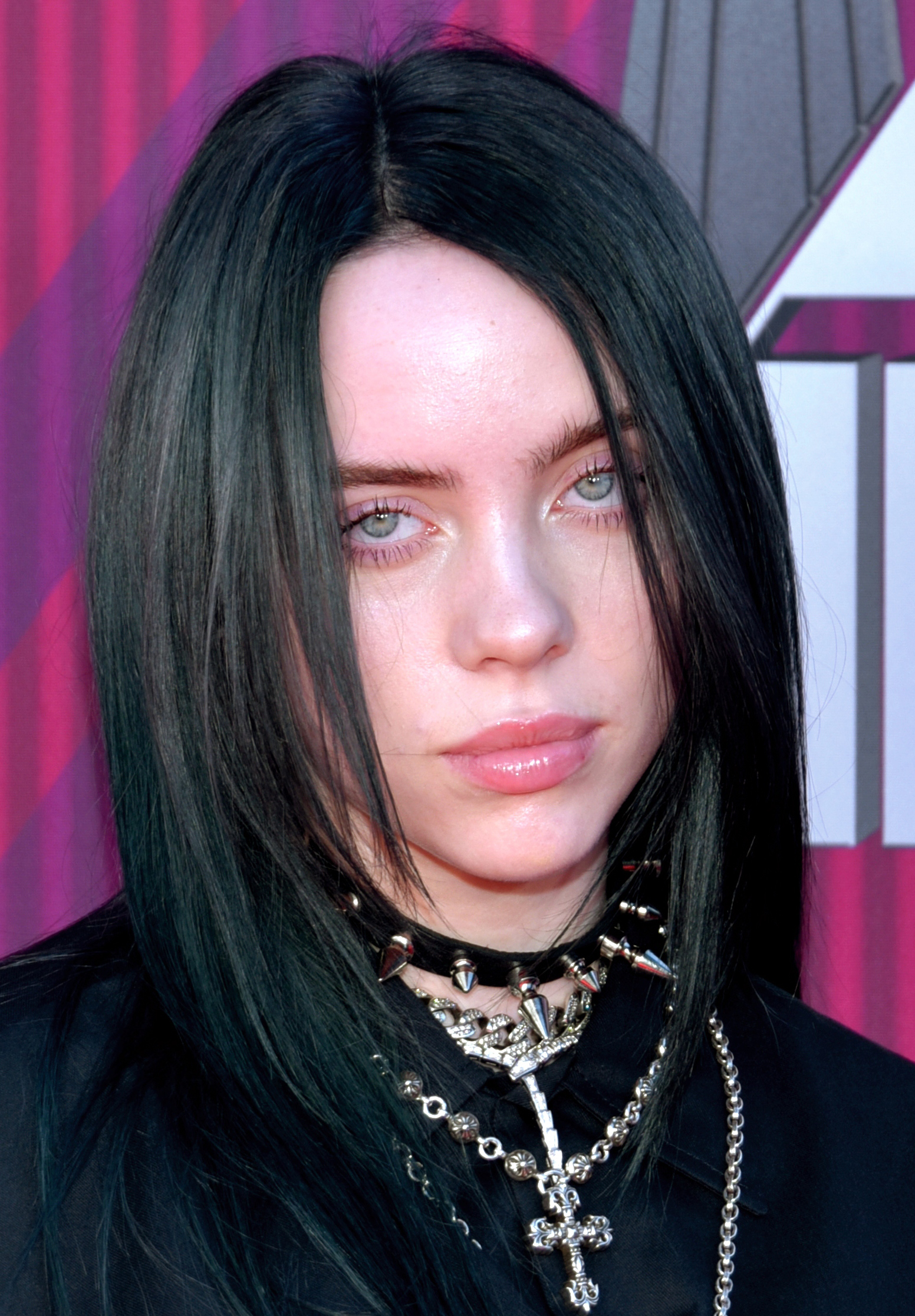
With "Bad Guy", Billie Eilish became the first artist born in the 21st century to have a number-one song on the Hot 100 and the youngest since Lorde in 2013 to top the chart.

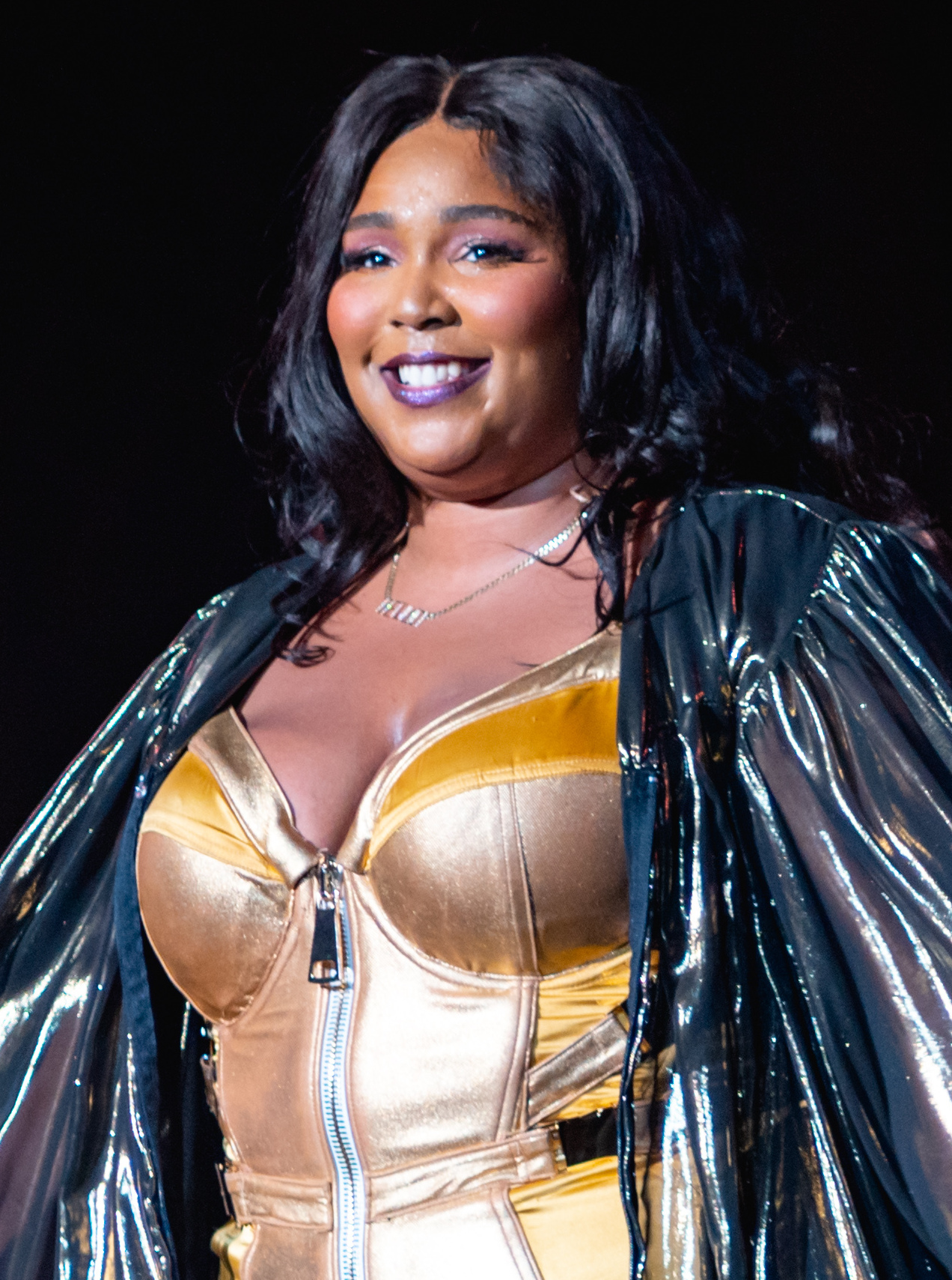
Lizzo achieved the longest-running number-one solo song by a female rapper with "Truth Hurts", which topped the Hot 100 for seven weeks.

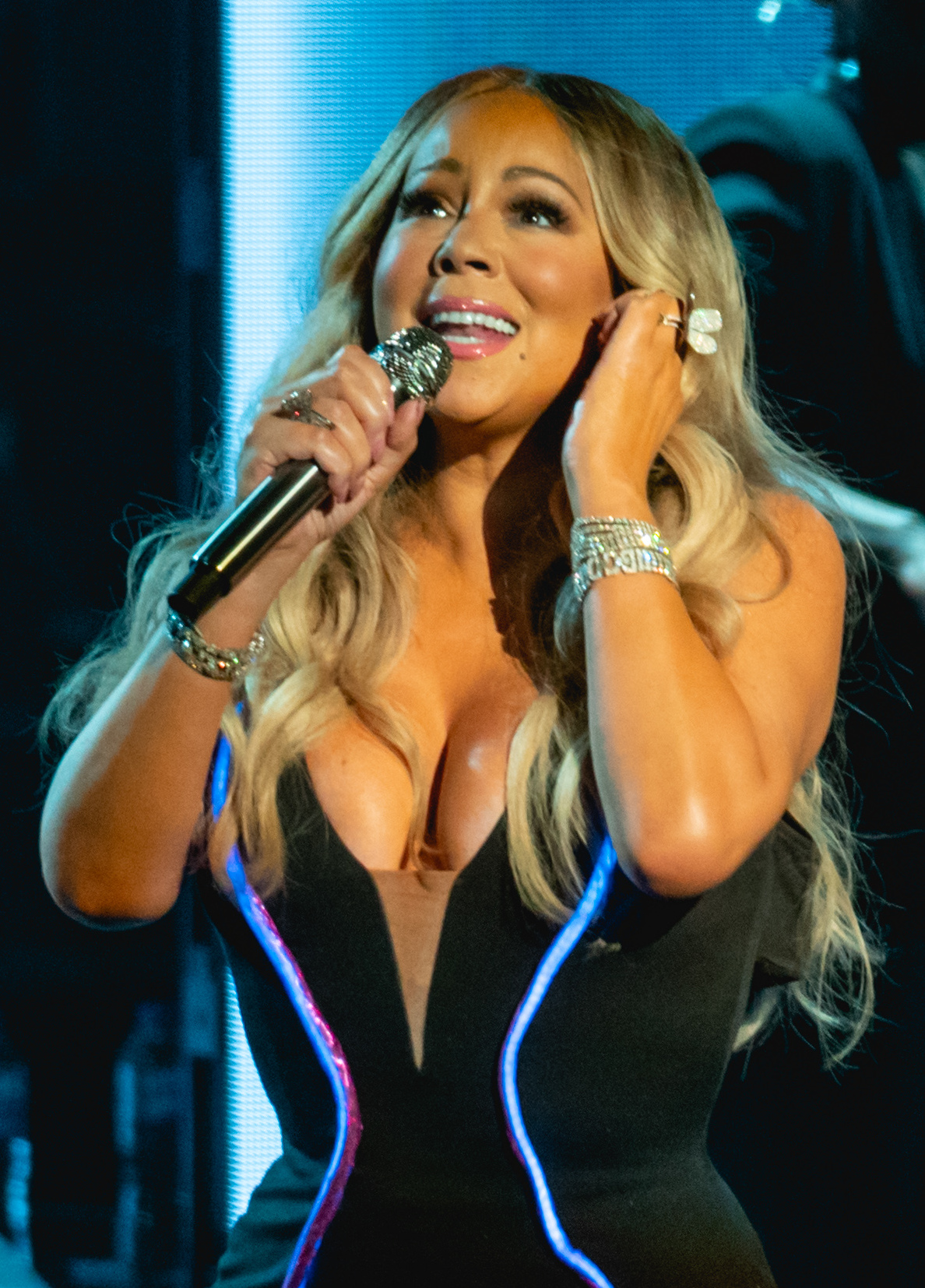
Mariah Carey's "All I Want for Christmas Is You" hit number one for the first time ever 25 years after its release and became her 19th number-one single, extending her own record for most number ones among soloists on the Hot 100. The song would later go on the help Carey reclaim the record for most number of weeks at number one for a single song.

Key
†	Indicates best-performing song of 2019

No.	Issue date	Song	Artist(s)	Ref.
re	January 5	"Thank U, Next"	Ariana Grande	
1081	January 12	"Without Me"	Halsey	
1082	January 19	"Sunflower"	Post Malone and Swae Lee	
re	January 26	"Without Me"	Halsey	
1083	February 2	"7 Rings"	Ariana Grande	
1083	February 9	"7 Rings"	Ariana Grande	
1083	February 16	"7 Rings"	Ariana Grande	
1083	February 23	"7 Rings"	Ariana Grande	
1083	March 2	"7 Rings"	Ariana Grande	
1084	March 9	"Shallow"	Lady Gaga and Bradley Cooper	
1085	March 16	"Sucker"	Jonas Brothers	
re	March 23	"7 Rings"	Ariana Grande	
re	March 30	"7 Rings"	Ariana Grande	
re	April 6	"7 Rings"	Ariana Grande	
1086	April 13	"Old Town Road" †	Lil Nas X	
1086	April 20	"Old Town Road" †	Lil Nas X featuring Billy Ray Cyrus (Note: From the issue dated April 20, Billy Ray Cyrus is given a featured artist credit.)	
1086	April 27	"Old Town Road" †	Lil Nas X featuring Billy Ray Cyrus	
1086	May 4	"Old Town Road" †	Lil Nas X featuring Billy Ray Cyrus	
1086	May 11	"Old Town Road" †	Lil Nas X featuring Billy Ray Cyrus	
1086	May 18	"Old Town Road" †	Lil Nas X featuring Billy Ray Cyrus	
1086	May 25	"Old Town Road" †	Lil Nas X featuring Billy Ray Cyrus	
1086	June 1	"Old Town Road" †	Lil Nas X featuring Billy Ray Cyrus	
1086	June 8	"Old Town Road" †	Lil Nas X featuring Billy Ray Cyrus	
1086	June 15	"Old Town Road" †	Lil Nas X featuring Billy Ray Cyrus	
1086	June 22	"Old Town Road" †	Lil Nas X featuring Billy Ray Cyrus	
1086	June 29	"Old Town Road" †	Lil Nas X featuring Billy Ray Cyrus	
1086	July 6	"Old Town Road" †	Lil Nas X featuring Billy Ray Cyrus	
1086	July 13	"Old Town Road" †	Lil Nas X featuring Billy Ray Cyrus	
1086	July 20	"Old Town Road" †	Lil Nas X featuring Billy Ray Cyrus	
1086	July 27	"Old Town Road" †	Lil Nas X featuring Billy Ray Cyrus	
1086	August 3	"Old Town Road" †	Lil Nas X featuring Billy Ray Cyrus	
1086	August 10	"Old Town Road" †	Lil Nas X featuring Billy Ray Cyrus	
1086	August 17	"Old Town Road" †	Lil Nas X featuring Billy Ray Cyrus	
1087	August 24	"Bad Guy"	Billie Eilish	
1088	August 31	"Señorita"	Shawn Mendes and Camila Cabello	
1089	September 7	"Truth Hurts"	Lizzo	
1089	September 14	"Truth Hurts"	Lizzo	
1089	September 21	"Truth Hurts"	Lizzo	
1089	September 28	"Truth Hurts"	Lizzo	
1089	October 5	"Truth Hurts"	Lizzo	
1089	October 12	"Truth Hurts"	Lizzo	
1090	October 19	"Highest in the Room"	Travis Scott	
re	October 26	"Truth Hurts"	Lizzo	
1091	November 2	"Someone You Loved"	Lewis Capaldi	
1092	November 9	"Lose You to Love Me"	Selena Gomez	
re	November 16	"Someone You Loved"	Lewis Capaldi	
re	November 23	"Someone You Loved"	Lewis Capaldi	
1093	November 30	"Circles"	Post Malone	
1093	December 7	"Circles"	Post Malone	
1094	December 14	"Heartless"	The Weeknd	
1095	December 21	"All I Want for Christmas Is You"	Mariah Carey	
1095	December 28	"All I Want for Christmas Is You"	Mariah Carey	

== Number-one artists ==
List of number-one artists by total weeks at number one
Position	Artist	Weeks at No. 1
1	Lil Nas X	19
2	Billy Ray Cyrus	18
3	Ariana Grande	9
4	Lizzo	7
5	Post Malone	3
5	Lewis Capaldi	3
7	Halsey	2
7	Mariah Carey	2
9	Swae Lee	1
9	Lady Gaga	1
9	Bradley Cooper	1
9	Jonas Brothers	1
9	Billie Eilish	1
9	Shawn Mendes	1
9	Camila Cabello	1
9	Travis Scott	1
9	Selena Gomez	1
9	The Weeknd	1

== See also ==
- 2019 in American music
- List of Billboard 200 number-one albums of 2019
- List of Billboard Hot 100 top-ten singles in 2019
- Billboard Year-End Hot 100 singles of 2019
- List of Billboard Hot 100 number-one singles of the 2010s
