= 24:26 =

EP by Beenzino
- Released: 3 July 2012
- Genre: Hip hop
- Length: 38:06
- Label: Illionaire Records
- Producer: Primary; Lee Da Heen; Jinbo; Shimmy Twice; Oh Jeongil; Philtre; Dok2

Beenzino chronology
24:26 (2012)	Up All Night (2014)

24:26 (stylised 2 4 : 2 6) is the extended play (EP) by South Korean rapper Beenzino. The album was released on 7 July 2012.

== Background ==
After Jazzyfact's first album Lifes Like, Beenzino signed with Dok2 and The Quiett's label Illionaire Records for his solo career. The album consists of a total of 9 songs, and the last track on the album Always Awake is a 2011 single released by Jazzyfact. The album cover was drawn by himself.

== Critical reception ==
Professional ratings
Review scores
Source	Rating
IZM	3.5/5 stars
Rhythmer	4/5 stars

Jeon Minseok of IZM evaluated the album as a good part of lyrics and trendy music based on daily life in flow on a jazz and not boring beat. Nam Seonghoon of Rhythmer described the album as his debut work showing the aspect of a rap star who stands at the apex of the genre scene without any particular compromise and draws both the public and genre fans to the power of rap. The selection committee for the 2013 Korean Music Awards Kim Bonghyeon described it as an album that could be the most exemplary if hip hop had to be popularised, and the album was nominated for the Best Rap & Hip hop Album.

== Track listing ==
No.	Title	Writer(s)	Producer(s)	Length
1.	"Nike Shoes" (featuring Dynamic Duo)	Beenzino; Choiza; Gaeko	Primary	4:32
2.	"Slowdown" (진절머리) (featuring Okasian and Dok2)	Beenzino; Okasian; Dok2	Dok2	4:47
3.	"Boogie On & On"	Beenzino	Lee Da Heen	3:31
4.	"Aqua Man"	Beenzino	Jinbo	3:47
5.	"Summer Madness" (featuring The Quiett)	Beenzino; The Quiett	Shimmy Twice	4:27
6.	"I'll Be Back"	Beenzino	Oh Jeongil	4:14
7.	"Profile" (featuring Dok2 and The Quiett)	Beenzino; Dok2; The Quiett	Dok2	4:49
8.	"If I Die Tomorrow"	Beenzino	Philtre	4:18
9.	"Always Awake"	Beenzino	Shimmy Twice	3:41
Total length:				38:06
