= Soon You'll Get Better =

2019 song by Taylor Swift featuring the Dixie Chicks

Song by Taylor Swift featuring the Dixie Chicks

from the album Lover
- Released: August 23, 2019
- Studio: Electric Lady (New York)
- Genre: Country
- Length: 3:22
- Label: Republic
- Songwriters: Taylor Swift; Jack Antonoff
- Producers: Taylor Swift; Jack Antonoff

Audio video
- "Soon You'll Get Better" on YouTube

"Soon You'll Get Better" is a song by the American singer-songwriter Taylor Swift featuring the American country band the Dixie Chicks. (Note: The Dixie Chicks renamed to the Chicks in 2020, and they appeared under their old name on the credits for "Soon You'll Get Better".) Swift wrote and produced the song with Jack Antonoff for her seventh studio album, Lover (2019). "Soon You'll Get Better" is a country ballad featuring slide guitar, banjo, and fiddle alongside vocal harmonies. Inspired by Swift's parents' cancer diagnoses, the lyrics discuss her feelings after she had found out her mother's diagnosis.

Music critics acclaimed the vulnerable songwriting of "Soon You'll Get Better" and deemed Swift's vocals emotional; they compared the tone of the song to prayers and lullabies. The track peaked at number 63 on the US Billboard Hot 100 and marked the Dixie Chicks' first Hot Country Songs entry in 13 years. It also entered the singles charts of Australia, Canada, and Scotland. It was certified gold in Australia and Brazil. On April 18, 2020, Swift performed a solo piano rendition of the song as part of the One World: Together at Home livestream charity event.

== Background and recording ==
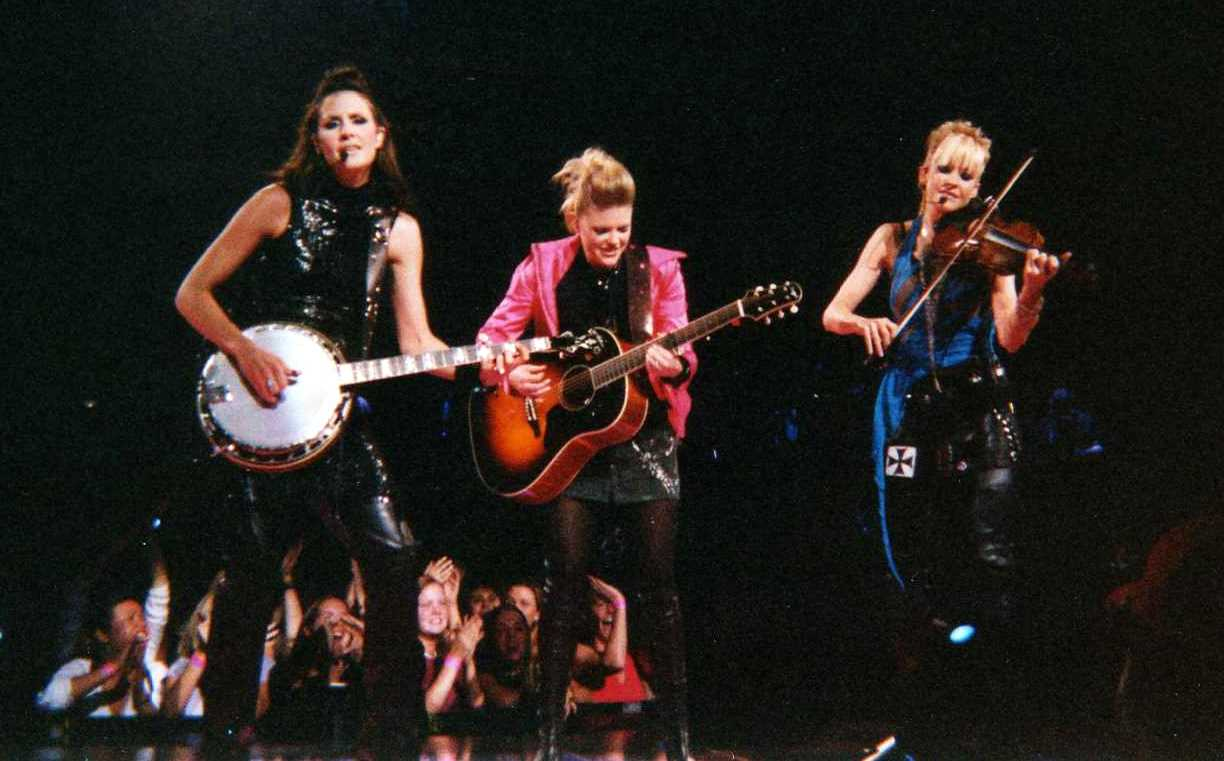
"Soon You'll Get Better" features instruments and backing harmonies by the Dixie Chicks (pictured).

Taylor Swift conceived her seventh studio album, Lover, as a "love letter to love" itself that explores the many feelings evoked by love. The album was influenced by the connections she felt with her fans on the Reputation Stadium Tour (2018), which helped her recalibrate her personal life and artistic direction after the media controversies surrounding her celebrity at the time. Republic Records released Lover on August 23, 2019. It was Swift's first album under Republic after her previous contract with Big Machine ended. "Soon You'll Get Better" is a song that Swift said was the album's hardest track to write. It was inspired by the cancer diagnoses that Swift's parents received: "My dad got cancer when I was 13 and he got better, and it wasn't a very long process, but things with my mom have been very different." In a live video broadcast on YouTube the day before the album's release, Swift said that she and her family had a discussion before deciding to publish and release "Soon You'll Get Better", because of how personal the song was.

The country band Dixie Chicks featured on "Soon You'll Get Better". Swift asked the Dixie Chicks to collaborate with her around the time when Jack Antonoff, a producer for Lover, was also working with them. She explained that the Dixie Chicks were "the band that made [her] wanna do this", saying that they taught her to have both a "strong female voice" and a "very feminine aesthetic". Because of the track's personal nature, Swift said having the Dixie Chicks on the song was because of how "they were such a big part of [her] life". In a July 2020 interview with Billboard, the band admitted that collaborating with Swift "felt like a lot of pressure" because they worried if they would dislike the track, but they ended up loving it and credited Swift with helping "so many girls for the future [...], just showing that vulnerable place of figuring this shit out for herself".

== Composition ==
Swift wrote and produced "Soon You'll Get Better" with Antonoff, who recorded the track with Laura Sisk at Electric Lady Studios in New York City. "Soon You'll Get Better" is a country ballad with a stripped-down acoustic production instrumented by sparse, fingerpicked strings such as slide guitars, banjo played by Emily Strayer, and fiddle played by Martie Maguire. All members of the Dixie Chicks (Strayer, Maguire, Natalie Maines) sing vocal harmonies. Time's Dana Schwartz described the track as a "tilt back to [Swift's] country roots" and USA Today's Meave McDermott said it had a "Nashville feel". Swift sings with understated vocals; Roisin O'Connor of The Independent described them as "half-whispers" and said that she sang the song as if she were "on the verge of tears".

The lyrics detail Swift's emotions after learning about her mother's cancer diagnosis, starting with a scene where she and her mother are in a doctor's office ("The buttons of my coat were tangled in my hair in doctor's office lighting") before proceeding with Swift's prayers to God ("Holy orange bottles, each night, I pray to you/ Desperate people find faith, so now I pray to Jesus too") but also expressing her doubts in religion. She is in denial of her mother's illness, but she admires how her mother stays positive ("You like the nicer nurses, you make the best of a bad deal"). She tells herself of happy endings but realizes they are delusional ("I know delusion when I see it in the mirror [...] This won't go back to normal"). In the bridge, Swift details her thought spirals ("I hate to make this all about me/ But who am I supposed to talk to?/ What am I supposed to do/ If there's no you?"). The Irish Times's Louise Bruton thought that the track captured "the fear and the silence of a hospital room".

== Critical reception ==
"Soon You'll Get Better" received acclaim from critics, who praised both the tender sound and emotional lyrics. Dermott, Raisa Bruner from Time, and Mikael Wood from the Los Angeles Times compared the tone of the track to prayers, lullabies, and hymns. Bruner said that the soft melody was contrasted by the "brutal stanzas" about the health conditions of Swift's mother, which elevated the song's emotional impact. Wood ranked the track as the second-best on Lover, behind "Cruel Summer". Vulture's Jewly Height described the vocals as "hushed" and said that Swift's storytelling perspective was "like [that of] a cinematographer—first the focus on a tiny detail [...], then a zoomed-out shot of the settings where the trouble's playing out". Height praised Swift's delivery for exhibiting "breathiness, crisp enunciation, and telegraphed sincerity", which he deemed a welcoming sign of a return to the country roots of her earlier music after the "various shades of rhythmic, electronic-based pop" on her past albums.

Consequence of Sound's Natalia Barr picked "Soon You'll Get Better" as one of the album's "essential" tracks, highlighting its acoustic production and "the most heavenly harmonies of [Swift's] career". Claire Shaffer of Rolling Stone and Jon Pareles from The New York Times praised the Dixie Chicks' harmony vocals for complementing the emotional impact; the former thought that the understated production highlighted Swift's lyrics, which the latter found to contain "jolting specificity". Sam Brooks of The Spinoff described those harmonies as "literal angels coming around Swift as she grieves her mother's cancer" and said that Swift's vocals had improved, as shown by "the way she's played around with her phrasing and the limitations of her voice". The Guardian's Alexis Petridis described the track as "gorgeous" and suitable for "those who think it all went wrong when she left Nashville" to "console themselves with". Anna Gaca of Pitchfork said that the position of "Soon You'll Get Better" in Lover's track list after the "relentlessly upbeat" "London Boy" brings forth a "mood swing [that] will knock you sideways".

Entertainment Weekly named "Soon You'll Get Better" as one of the ten "most emotionally devastating" songs of the 2010s decade and stated that the "heartbreaking" lyrics showcase Swift's pain and worry effectively. They also labelled the bridge of the song as "the saddest" bridge in Swift's discography. Nate Jones of Vulture placed the song 65th on his ranking of Swift's 214 songs as of November 2022, calling it "simple, sincere, and affecting".

== Commercial performance ==
Upon the release of Lover, "Soon You'll Get Better" debuted at number 63 on the US Billboard Hot 100. It was the Dixie Chicks' first entry on the Hot 100 since "Not Ready to Make Nice" (2007). The song reached number 10 on Hot Country Songs, where it became Swift's 21st top-10 entry and her first since the collaboration with Sugarland on "Babe" (2018). For the Dixie Chicks, it was their first appearance on the chart since "Everybody Knows" (2006). Elsewhere, "Soon You'll Get Better" reached the singles charts of Canada (71) and Scotland (97). In Australia, the song peaked at number 54 on the ARIA Singles Chart and was certified gold by the Australian Recording Industry Association (ARIA). In the United Kingdom, it peaked at number 98 on the Audio Streaming Chart.

== Live performance ==
On April 18, 2020, Swift performed a solo piano rendition of "Soon You'll Get Better" as part of the One World: Together At Home television special, a benefit event by Global Citizen to raise funds for the World Health Organization's COVID-19 Solidarity Response Fund. It was her first time performing this track, after she previously stated that she would not perform it because of how "difficult" it is for her to "emotionally deal" with its meaning. Media publications deemed the performance "moving". Jem Aswad of Variety thought that the track was suitable for "countless people praying for the recovery of loved ones affected by the coronavirus pandemic that the show is working to rally relief for". In MTV News, Trey Alston praised Swift's piano rendition for "bringing [the song] to life" and highlighted the simplicity of her performance: "There aren't any smiles, winks, or any other theatrics. It's just Swift and her instrument, working to immerse viewers in the moment with her."

Many publications considered "Soon You'll Get Better" one of the best moments of the Together At Home special. Billboard commended that Swift "effectively ripped our hearts out and reminded us of the power of music to both reflect and ease our pain", describing the moment as "tough, lovely and cathartic". Radio Times wrote that she "powered through the song [...], having to keep her eyes clenched throughout". Variety's Chris Willman lauded Swift as "sober truth-teller at nearly the last minute" and said of the song: "there couldn't have been a more appropriate song for all the families of ICU patients sitting at home." "Soon You'll Get Better" was among the top three sellers from the show, along with Maluma's "Carnaval" and Kacey Musgraves's "Rainbow"; these three songs together accounted for 42% of the total song sales generated by the show. "Soon You'll Get Better" sold more than 1,000 downloads on April 18, 2020, compared to negligible sales the day before.

Swift has since never performed the song live, and it was one of the few tracks from her discography that she did not sing on the shows of her Eras Tour (2023–2024). Even so, the song was featured in an episode of the tour's associated documentary miniseries, Taylor Swift: The End of an Era (2025).

== Personnel ==
- Taylor Swift – vocals, songwriter, producer
- Jack Antonoff – producer, songwriter, acoustic guitar, keyboards, piano, Wurlitzer, recording engineer
- The Dixie Chicks – featured vocals, backing vocals
- Emily Strayer – banjo
- Martie Maguire – fiddle
- Laura Sisk – recording engineer
- John Rooney – assistant recording engineer
- John Hanes – mix engineer
- Serban Ghenea – mixer

== Charts ==
Chart performance for "Soon You'll Get Better"
Chart (2019)	Peak position
Australia (ARIA)	54
Canada Hot 100 (Billboard)	71
Scottish Singles Sales (Official Charts)	97
UK Audio Streaming (Official Charts)	98
US Billboard Hot 100	63
US Hot Country Songs (Billboard)	10
US Rolling Stone Top 100	31

== Certifications ==
Certifications for "Soon You'll Get Better"
Region	Certification	Certified units/sales
Australia (ARIA)	Gold	35,000^{‡}
Brazil (Pro-Música Brasil)	Gold	20,000^{‡}
New Zealand (RMNZ)	Gold	15,000^{‡}
^{‡} Sales+streaming figures based on certification alone.
