= Lifes Like =

Studio album by Jazzyfact
- Released: October 26, 2010
- Genre: Hip hop; jazz rap
- Length: 47:17

Jazzyfact chronology
Lifes Like (2010)	Waves Like (2017)

Lifes Like is the debut studio album by South Korean hip hop duo Jazzyfact. The album was released on 26 October 2010.

== Background ==
Beenzino and Shimmy Twice formed the jazz rap duo Jazzyfact in 2008, and they released the single Addicted 2 in 2009. The album was recorded in various forms of sampling, and they collaborated with design team Aleatotik to create an album cover photo.

== Critical reception ==
Professional ratings
Review scores
Source	Rating
IZM	4/5 stars

Hyeon Minhyeong of IZM reviewed "Beenzino's dream, expressed through Shimmy Twice, seems immature because it is not bound by realistic conditions, but it is impressive to insist on the faded purity due to capitalism." Shin Yerin of Art Insight described the album as "Lifes Like was refreshing to know that the combination of Beenzino and Shimmy Twice, who were rising stars in 2010, as well as the combination of jazz and hip-hop, which was not popular at the time, told a very everyday story."

== Track listing ==
No.	Title	Length
1.	"A Tribe Called Jazzyfact"	2:25
2.	"？!." (featuring DJ Pumkin)	3:51
3.	"Addicted 2"	3:37
4.	"Way too Good" ("아까워")	3:41
5.	"Kissinterlude"	2:24
6.	"Friday Move (TGIF)"	3:58
7.	"Close to You"	3:53
8.	"Take a Little Time" (featuring Sean2Slow)	3:40
9.	"Mom's Call" (featuring Verbal Jint)	3:11
10.	"Jamminterlude"	1:47
11.	"Up in Here" ("각자의 새벽") (featuring Dok2 and Beatbox DG)	4:39
12.	"Stranger's Theme"	2:32
13.	"Vibra"	3:42
14.	"Smoking Dreams"	3:57
