= Beenzino =

South Korean rapper (born 1987)

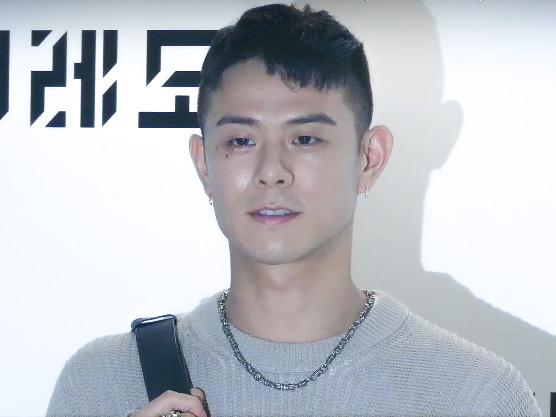
- Beenzino in May 2019
- Born: Lim Sung-bin; September 12, 1987 (age 39); South Korea
- Occupations: Rapper; record producer
- Spouse: Stefanie Michova (m. 2022)
- Children: 1
- Musical career
- Genre: Hip hop
- Years active: 2009–present
- Labels: Illionaire Records; Beasts and Natives Alike

Korean name
- Hangul: 임성빈
- RR: Im Seongbin
- MR: Im Sŏngbin

Lim Sung-bin (Korean: 임성빈; born September 12, 1987), better known by the stage name Beenzino (빈지노), is a South Korean rapper. Beenzino first gained popularity through the duo Jazzyfact, which he formed with Shimmy Twice in 2008. And he made his first official public appearance at Dok2's Hustle Real Hard Concert on June 5, 2011, and has since released three solo albums, as well as other works in collaboration with hip hop producers Primary and Shimmy Twice, and as the duo Hot Clip with South Korean rapper Beatbox DG. He is noted for his melodic style of rapping.

After establishing his reputation within the Korean rap scene, he became well known through singles such as "Dali, Van, Picasso", which was a mainstream hit. Beenzino toured as a solo artist in the U.S. in 2015.

== History ==
=== Early life and career beginnings ===
For a few years as a young child, Beenzino lived in Christchurch, New Zealand, eventually moving back to Korea before middle school, which he attended in Yangpyeong, Gyeonggi province. He enrolled at Seoul National University to study sculpture, and graduated in 2014.

His stage name is a play on that of Boston rapper Benzino, combined with "빈" (pronounced "been") from his birth name. He first gained recognition by posting recordings to the DC Tribe website, through which he was first recruited by established rapper Simon Dominic. He went on to feature on albums by well-known artists including Dok2, Epik High, Supreme Team, and Verbal Jint, and released albums as part of the rap duos Jazzyfact (with producer Shimmy Twice) and Hotclip (with Beatbox DG).

=== Debut as a solo artist ===
Beenzino made his debut as a solo MC on hip hop producer Primary's collaborative album P'Skool's Daily Apartment, released July 28, 2009. By 2011, he was a respected solo artist, although still a rookie by industry standards. In October, he featured on Primary's 2011 album Primary and the Messengers.

In 2012, Beenzino released his first solo album, 24:26, and performed with Illionaire Records during their nationwide Korean tour that summer. In November, he collaborated with label-mates The Quiett and Dok2 in the free digital single "Illionaire Gang", which was released to coincide with their November 11 Illionaire Day Concert.

In 2013, the pre-release of his single "Dali, Van, Picasso" from his 2014 album Up All Night was downloaded almost 600,000 times without a music video, and propelled him to mainstream success. He went on to perform at MU:Con 2013 and featured on albums by K.Will (The Third Album Part 2: Love Blossom) and Lee Hyori (Monochrome).

In April 2014, he featured on the Junggigo song "Want U", which was a number one hit in Korea and sold over a million copies. He also performed at the 2014 Asian Music Festival on May 25 in New York City and the One Hip Hop Festival at Hongik University, and as a featured guest during Verbal Jint's international concert tour.

In 2016, he released his third album, 12, including the prior releases "Dali, Van, Picasso", "We Are Going To", and "Break".

In 2020, Beenzino left Illionaire Records and joined fellow rapper and friend E Sens after signing with Beasts and Natives Alike in 2021.

== Personal life ==
In August 2022, Beenzino registered his marriage to model Stefanie Michova, and the wedding has yet to be decided. On May 23, 2024, Beenzino and Michova made an announcement on Instagram that they are expecting their first child. The couple welcomed their first child, a son named Ru-bin, on November 9, 2024.

== Discography ==
=== Studio albums ===
Title	Album details	Peak chart positions	Sales
Title	Album details	KOR	Sales
12	Released: May 31, 2016; Label: Illionaire, CJ E&M; Formats: CD, digital download; Track listing: 1. "Time Travel"; 2. "At the End of Saturday" (토요일의 끝에서) feat. Black Nut; 3. "I Don't Mind"; 4. "Flexin!"; 5. "January" feat. YDG; 6. "Being Myself"; 7. "Break"; 8. "Imagine Time" feat. Suran; 9. "Found" (젖고있어); 10. "Dali, Van, Picasso"; 11. "We Are Going To"	11	KOR: 6,002
Nowitzki	Released: July 3, 2023; Label: Bana, Kakao Entertainment; Formats: CD, digital download; Track listing: 1. "Stinky Kiss" (Intro); 2. "Monet"; 3. "In Bed/Makgulli" (침대에서/막걸리); 4. "Travel Again" (여행 Again) feat. Cautious Clay; 5. "Dope As" (Interlude); 6. "Coca Cola Red" feat. oygli 7. "990" feat. Kim Ximya; 8. "Lemon"; 9. "Like a Fool" (바보같이) feat. Y2K92; 10. "Trippy" feat. Lance Skiiiwalker; 11. "Crime" feat. 250 & Bek Hyunjin; 12. "Camp"; 13. "Sanso" (Interlude); 14. "Change"; 15. "Just One Day" (단 하루); 16. "Sandman"; 17. "Radio"; 18. "Gym"	3	KOR: 51,716

=== Extended plays ===
Title	Album details	Peak chart positions	Sales
Title	Album details	KOR	Sales
24:26	Released: July 3, 2012; Label: Illionaire Records, Genie Music; Formats: CD, digital download; Track listing: 1. Nike Shoes feat. Dynamic Duo; 2. Slow it Down (진절머리) feat. Okasian & Dok2; 3. Boogie On & On; 4. Aqua Man; 5. Summer Madness feat. The Quiett; 6. I'll Be Back; 7. Profile feat. Dok2 & The Quiett; 8. If I Die Tomorrow; 9. Always Awake	—	—N/a
Up All Night	Released: July 16, 2014; Label: Illionaire Records, CJ E&M; Formats: CD, digital download; Track listing: 1. Jackson Pollock D*ck; 2. How Do I Look?; 3. Crazy (미쳤어) feat. Don Mills; 4. Up All Night feat. Mayson the Soul; 5. I Don't Have to Work	12	KOR: 3,212
24:26 (5th Anniversary Remaster)	Released: July 11, 2017; Label: Illionaire Records, Genie Music; Formats: CD, digital download; Track listing: 1. Nike Shoes feat. Dynamic Duo; 2. Slow it Down (진절머리) feat. Okasian & Dok2; 3. Boogie On & On; 4. Aqua Man; 5. Summer Madness feat. The Quiett; 6. I'll Be Back; 7. Profile feat. Dok2 & The Quiett; 8. If I Die Tomorrow; 9. Always Awake	6	KOR: 5,441
"—" denotes releases that did not chart.

=== Singles ===
==== As lead artist ====
Title	Year	Peak chart positions	Sales (DL)	Album
Title	Year	KOR	Sales (DL)	Album
As lead artist
"I'll Be Back"	2012	—	—N/a	24:26
"Slow It Down" (진절머리) feat. Okasian & Dok2	2012	—	—N/a	24:26
"Boogie On & On"	2012	62	KOR: 303,976	24:26
"Aqua Man"	2012	87	KOR: 22,915	24:26
"Dali, Van, Picasso"	2013	1	KOR: 662,041	12
"How Do I Look?"	2014	6	KOR: 335,812	Up All Night
"So What" (어쩌라고)	2015	4	KOR: 319,534	Non-album single
"Break"	2015	13	KOR: 357,889	12
"We Are Going To"	2015	59	KOR: 43,310	12
"Life in Color"	2016	43	KOR: 91,019	Non-album single
"Saturday" (토요일의 끝에서) feat. Black Nut	2016	12	KOR: 233,974	12
"January" feat. YDG	2016	52	KOR: 27,104	12
"Time Travel"	2016	36	KOR: 53,598	12
"OKGO" feat. E Sens	2019	90	—N/a	Non-album singles
"Fashion Hoarder" feat. Zene the Zilla	2019	86	—N/a	Non-album singles
"Blurry" feat. Dbo	2019	82	—N/a	Non-album singles
"Trippy"	2023	138	—N/a	Nowitzki
"Monet"	2023	149	—N/a	Nowitzki
"In Bed/Makgulli" (침대에서/막걸리)	2023	159	—N/a	Nowitzki
"Coca Cola Red" feat. Oygli	2023	189	—N/a	Nowitzki
"990" feat. Kim Ximya	2023	166	—N/a	Nowitzki
"Travel Again" (여행 Again) feat. Cautious Clay	2023	73	—N/a	Nowitzki
Collaborations
"Illionaire Way" with The Quiett & Dok2	2011	—	—N/a	Non-album single
"U & I" with Toy & Crush	2014	3	KOR: 435,678	Da Capo
"Rockin' With The Best" with The Quiett & Dok2	2014	96	KOR: 16,793	Non-album single
"The Color" with Yoon Jong-shin	2015	54	KOR: 55,953	Monthly Project 2015
"No Matter What" with BoA	2016	7	KOR: 292,678	SM Station Season 1
"The Fearless Ones" with The Quiett, Sik-K, Changmo	2019	—	—N/a	Non-album single
"—" denotes releases that did not chart.

==== As featured artist ====
Title	Year	Peak chart positions	Album
Title	Year	KOR	Album
"The Invisible Man" (투명인간) Tiramisu feat. Beenzino	2010	—	Non-album single
"Tomorrow Sucks" (Bonus Mix) Demicat feat. Beenzino, Sean2slow	2010	—	Tomorrow Sucks
"Smoke" VidaLoca feat. Beenzino	2010	—	Non-album single
"How Dare You Pour Oil or Something" (기름 같은걸 끼얹나) Verbal Jint feat. Beenzino, Deb	2010	91	Go Easy 0.5
"Fantom" Dok2 feat. Beenzino	2010	—	Non-album single
"Would You Be My" Paloalto feat. Beenzino	2011	—	Fever For Calmness
"She's There" VidaLoca feat. Beenzino, Zion.T	2011	—	Non-album single
"Handalas" (안달났어) Leo Kekoa feat. Beenzino, MC Meta	2011	—	Missing Soul
"Don't Do That" (그쯤에서 해) Dok2 feat. Beenzino, The Quiett	2012	—	Non-album singles
"What I See" Prepix feat. Yong Jun-hyung, Beenzino, Esna	2012	—	Non-album singles
"Get Dough" The Quiett feat. Beenzino	2012	—	AMBITIQN
"Thank You" D-Unit feat. Beenzino	2013	75	Non-album single
"Where'd They Go" (Dub Remix) Nuol feat. Beenzino	2013	—	Dub In Nuol Vol.1
"So Good" Leo Kekoa feat. Beenzino, Yeeun	2013	45	Non-album singles
"A Real Lady" Swings feat. Beenzino, Gray, Zion.T	2013	9	Non-album singles
"Holiday" (홀리데이) Mayson the Soul feat. Beenzino	2013	—	Jackasoul
"Want U" (너를 원해) Junggigo feat. Beenzino	2014	1	Non-album single
"Ice Ice Baby" (얼음땡) Parc Jae-jung feat. Beenzino	2014	56	STEP 1
"On Your Body" (너의 몸에 벤) Ven feat. Beenzino	2014	75	THE VGINS
"Born Hater" Epik High feat. Beenzino, Verbal Jint, B.I, Mino, Bobby	2014	3	Shoebox
"Cheers" Gaeko, Yankie feat. Beenzino, Babylon	2015	28	Non-album single
"Get" Urban Zakapa feat. Beenzino	2015	10	UZ
"Mannequin" (마네퀸) Primary feat. Beenzino, Suran	2015	11	2
"Mayo" (마요) Shin Seung-hun feat. Beenzino	2015	36	I Am...& I Am
"Calling in Love" Suran feat. Beenzino	2015	—	Non-album single
"Surprise" (서프라이즈) Bumkey feat. Beenzino	2016	35	U-Turn
"Paldangdam" (팔당댐) Eddy Kim feat. Beenzino	2016	14	Non-album singles
"Thursday Night" (목요일 밤) Urban Zakapa feat. Beenzino	2016	2	Non-album singles
"Work Spirit" (작업혼) YDG feat. Beenzino	2016	—	Non-album singles
"Five More Minutes" (5분만 더) Sanchez feat. Beenzino	2017	48	Colour
"Ambition and Vision" Dok2 feat. Beenzino, Changmo, Kim Hyo-eun, Hash Swan, The Quiett	2017	—	Reborn
"You" (너야) Seulong feat. Beenzino	2017	40	Non-album singles
"Traffic Light" (신호등) Jero feat. Beenzino	2017	—	Non-album singles
"Outside" Crush feat. Beenzino	2017	12	Non-album singles
"Dope" DG feat. Beenzino	2017	—	Non-album singles
"Tropical Night" Microdot feat. Beenzino	2017	—	Prophet
"Seoul Night" (서울 밤) Urban Zakapa feat. Beenzino	2019	6	Non-album single
"Clear Vision" Zene the Zilla feat. Beenzino	2019	—	Yamangkkun
"Flip" Peniel feat. Beenzino	2019	—	Non-album single
"Stay Up" Baekhyun feat. Beenzino	2019	89	City Lights
"Hula Hoops" DPR Live feat. Beenzino, Hwasa	2021	185	Iite Cool [EP]
"Counting Stars" Be'O feat. Beenzino	2021	1	Non-album single
"—" denotes releases that did not chart.

=== Other charted songs ===
Title	Year	Peak chart positions	Album
Title	Year	KOR	Album
"Stinky Kiss (Intro)"	2023	180	Nowitzki
"Radio"	2023	194	Nowitzki

== Awards and nominations ==
Award ceremony	Year	Category	Nominee / Work	Result	Ref.
Korean Hip-hop Awards	2017	Artist of the Year	Beenzino	Nominated	
Korean Hip-hop Awards	2017	Hip Hop Album of the Year	12	Nominated	
Korean Hip-hop Awards	2017	Hip Hop Track of the Year	"Flexin'"	Nominated	
Korean Hip-hop Awards	2017	Collaboration of the Year	"January" (feat. YDG)	Nominated	
Korean Hip-hop Awards	2024	Artist of the Year	Beenzino	Won	
Korean Hip-hop Awards	2024	Hip Hop Album of the Year	Nowitzki	Won	
Korean Hip-hop Awards	2024	Hip Hop Track of the Year	"Travel Again" (feat. Cautious Clay)	Nominated	
Korean Music Awards	2013	Best Rap & Hip Hop Album	24:26	Nominated	
Korean Music Awards	2013	Best Rap & Hip Hop Song	"Aqua Man"	Nominated	
Korean Music Awards	2017	Best Rap & Hip Hop Album	12	Nominated	
Korean Music Awards	2017	Best Rap & Hip Hop Song	"Time Travel"	Nominated	
Korean Music Awards	2024	Album of the Year	Nowitzki	Won	
Korean Music Awards	2024	Best Rap & Hip Hop Album	Nowitzki	Won	
Korean Music Awards	2024	Artist of the Year	Beenzino	Nominated	
Korean Music Awards	2024	Song of the Year	"Travel Again" (feat. Cautious Clay)	Nominated	
Korean Music Awards	2024	Best Rap & Hip Hop Song	"Travel Again" (feat. Cautious Clay)	Nominated	
MAMA Awards	2016	Best Collaboration	"No Matter What" (with BoA)	Nominated	
Melon Music Awards	2014	Best Rap/Hip Hop Award	"How Do I Look?"	Nominated	
