= Lover (album) =

Studio album by Taylor Swift
- Released: August 23, 2019
- Recorded: November 2018 – February 2019
- Studios: Conway Recording (Los Angeles); Electric Lady (New York City); Golden Age West (Auckland); Golden Age (Los Angeles); Electric Feel (Los Angeles); Metropolis (London)
- Genres: Synth-pop; dream pop; pop rock
- Length: 61:48
- Label: Republic
- Producers: Taylor Swift; Jack Antonoff; Joel Little; Louis Bell; Frank Dukes

Taylor Swift chronology
Reputation (2017)	Lover (2019)	Live from Clear Channel Stripped 2008 (2020)

Singles from Lover
- 1. "Me!" Released: April 26, 2019; 2. "You Need to Calm Down" Released: June 14, 2019; 3. "Lover" Released: August 16, 2019; 4. "The Man" Released: January 27, 2020; 5. "Cruel Summer" Released: June 20, 2023

Lover is the seventh studio album by the American singer-songwriter Taylor Swift. It was released on August 23, 2019, through Republic Records. The album is her first after she departed from Big Machine Records, which caused a public dispute over the ownership of Swift's past albums.

Swift recorded Lover after finishing her 2018 Reputation Stadium Tour, having recalibrated her personal life and artistic direction following the public controversies that preceded her previous studio album, Reputation (2017). She produced Lover with Jack Antonoff, Joel Little, Louis Bell, and Frank Dukes. Described by Swift as a "love letter to love", the album explores wide-ranging emotions like infatuation, commitment, lust, and heartache; a few songs discuss political issues such as LGBT rights and feminism. Musically, Lover is primarily a 1980s-inspired synth-pop, dream pop, and pop rock record characterized by atmospheric synthesizers, mid-tempo rhythms, and acoustic instruments, with eclectic elements of country, folk, and funk.

Swift extensively promoted Lover through television shows, magazine covers, and press interviews. Lover's visual aesthetic featured bright pastel colors. Four singles were released in 2019–2020: "Me!", "You Need to Calm Down", "Lover", and "The Man"; the first three reached the top 10 of the Billboard Hot 100. The fifth single, "Cruel Summer", was released in 2023 and topped the Hot 100. In the United States, Lover was Swift's sixth consecutive number-one album on the Billboard 200 and the best-selling album of 2019, and was certified seven-times platinum by the Recording Industry Association of America. The global best-selling album by a solo artist of 2019, it topped charts and received multi-platinum certifications in Australia, Canada, New Zealand, and the United Kingdom.

When Lover was first released, music critics praised the emotional maturity and free-spirited sound of Swift's songwriting, but some took issue with the wide-ranging musical styles, calling them incohesive. Many publications included the album in their rankings of the best albums of 2019. It was nominated for the Grammy Award for Best Pop Vocal Album and won the American Music Award for Favorite Pop/Rock Album.

== Background ==
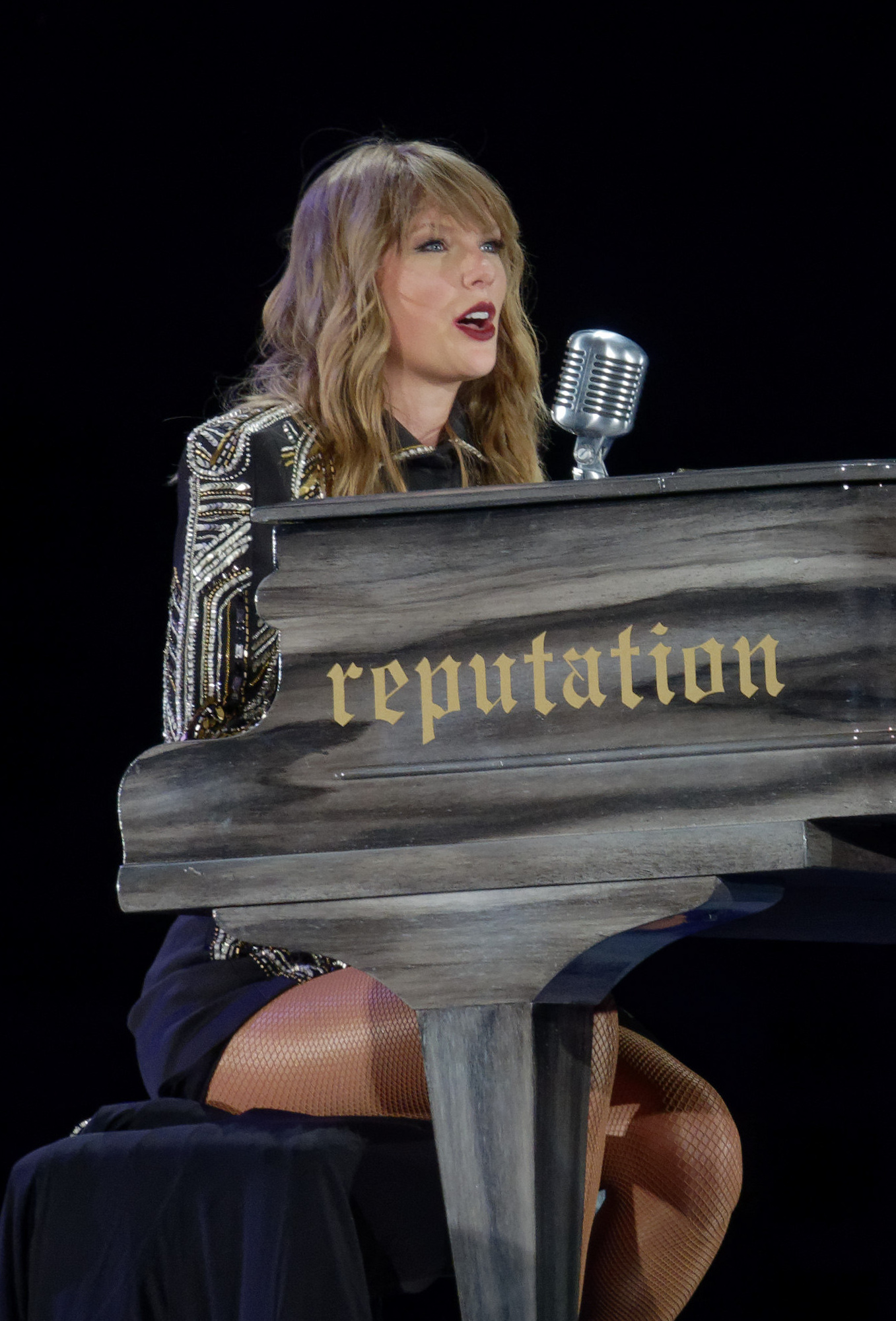
Lover channeled Swift's recalibrated personal life while on her 2018 Reputation Stadium Tour.

Swift recalibrated her artistry and image from country music to pop with her 2014 fifth studio album, 1989, which incorporated a 1980s synth-pop sound with dense synthesizers, programmed drum machines, electronic vocal processing, and dance-oriented arrangements. 1989 sold over five million copies in the United States within one year and propelled Swift toward global pop stardom, but her fame was blemished by tabloid gossip that publicized her short-lived romantic relationships with Calvin Harris and Tom Hiddleston. A mid-2016 dispute with the rapper Kanye West over his single "Famous" led to an internet cancellation movement against Swift.

The controversies influenced Swift's 2017 studio album, Reputation, a hip hop-influenced record with themes of vengeance and drama, presenting a vindictive image that outgrew her previous "America's Sweetheart" reputation. Reputation was Swift's last album with Big Machine Records, to which she had signed in 2006. She reflected on the album as a "defense mechanism" that helped her protect her mental health amidst the controversies and her forgone "America's Sweetheart" reputation as liberating, as she no longer had to be self-aware of being "always smiling, always happy".

After finishing the Reputation Stadium Tour in November 2018, Swift signed with Universal Music Group label Republic Records. She publicly voiced her political opinion for the first time upon endorsing two Democrat candidates for the 2018 midterm elections in her home state Tennessee. Swift recalled that on the Reputation Stadium Tour, her fans saw her "as a flesh-and-blood human being" and not just the media image of her, which "[assigned] humanity" to her life. She channeled this realization in writing songs for her seventh studio album: "This time around I feel more comfortable being brave enough to be vulnerable, because my fans are brave enough to be vulnerable with me."

== Themes and lyrics ==
As with her past albums, Lover was a reflection on Swift's personal life; she focused on creating music, deprioritized social media, and took her occupation as an entertainer less seriously. She wrote the album after having adjusted her state of mind and embraced a newfound sense of creativity. This sentiment is reflected in the opening track, "I Forgot That You Existed", in which Swift sings about no longer seeking vengeance against those who wronged her. She described the songwriting as very confessional and autobiographical, yet also playful and whimsical; she avoided disclosing the inspirations behind her lyrics. In the September 2019 issue of Vogue, Swift dubbed the album a "love letter to love, in all of its maddening, passionate, exciting, enchanting, horrific, tragic, wonderful glory". The track list consists of 18 songs that depict this theme, inspired by Swift's realization of what she called "love that was very real". In addition to purely romantic songs, Lover includes themes of sorrow and loneliness, which Swift said could be perceived "through a romantic gaze".

"Lover"
The title track is about Swift's commitment to her romantic partner. It combines indie folk and country, using acoustic instruments.

"Paper Rings"
The pop-punk track "Paper Rings" sees Swift disregarding materialistic concerns in love, incorporating a 1980s retro production.

Most tracks are straightforward, open-hearted love songs. The title track, "Lover", is about commitment to a romantic partner; the ways couples customize their marriage vows inspired its bridge. "Me!" is about self-affirmation and self-love. Lust is the theme of "I Think He Knows", which is about self-confidence after a reciprocated infatuation; and "False God", about the false hopes in a long-distance relationship. "Paper Rings" and "London Boy" explore playful and quirky aspects of love; the former is about a committed romance without materialistic concerns, and the latter is a romantic confession to an Englishman with tongue-in-cheek lyrics that name locations in London. The penultimate track "It's Nice to Have a Friend" tells a love story that begins in childhood and proceeds to adulthood; Swift considered the song a representation of the feelings one wishes to experience whether they are a child or an adult.

Other songs explore the pitfalls of romance. "The Archer" is about her self-awareness and acknowledgement of her past mistakes, and "Cruel Summer" is about a painful, fleeting summer romance. "Cornelia Street" narrates a relationship in which Swift is afraid she will lose her partner again if she repeats her earlier mistakes. She takes the blame for having hurt her partner on "Afterglow" and contemplates a loved one's prolonged medical treatment on "Soon You'll Get Better". "Death by a Thousand Cuts" was inspired by the romantic comedy film Someone Great and is about overcoming a failed relationship's painful aftermaths. Swift said that writing "Death by a Thousand Cuts" was "incredible news" to her because she could continue writing songs about heartbreak even if she was in a healthy relationship. In the closing track, "Daylight", Swift says that she "[wants] to be defined by the things that [she loves]" and contemplates that love to her now is "golden" rather than "burning red" as she once believed, a reference to the track "Red" of her 2012 studio album Red.

A few songs reflect Swift's perception of contemporary US politics. Since her 2006 debut as a country-music artist, Swift's record company had warned her against becoming involved in politics, (Note: Swift said this was a consequence of the Dixie Chicks controversy in 2003, when the Dixie Chicks were ostracized by the country-music audience after publicly criticizing President George W. Bush.) but after witnessing the political events affecting the rights of certain people, (Note: Among the events that influenced Swift's political outlook included a sexual assault trial that she won in 2017, the MeToo movement, the restrictions on LGBT rights, the rise of American nationalism, and white privilege.) she became disillusioned and decided to involve in the public political discourse. Swift wrote "Miss Americana & the Heartbreak Prince" after the 2018 midterm elections; its lyrics use high school as a metaphor for American politics because she thought the social events of a traditional American high school, like the political landscape, can alienate some people. "The Man" was inspired by the double standards women experience the music industry and in wider society. "You Need to Calm Down" advocates for LGBT rights, inspired by a conversation in which a friend asked Swift what she would do if she had a gay son; other inspirations were cyberbullies, cancel culture, and the way the mass media "pits [women] against each other".

== Production and music ==
Swift started recording Lover in November 2018, soon after she completed the Reputation Stadium Tour. She wanted to incorporate eclectic styles to accompany the diverse lyrical themes, which was made possible by her new contract with Republic Records granting her more artistic freedom than before. Swift recorded and produced much of Lover with Jack Antonoff, who had produced 1989 and Reputation; other producers are Joel Little, Frank Dukes, and Louis Bell, all of whom were first-time collaborators of Swift. The producers of respective tracks are credited as their co-writers alongside Swift, except for songs Swift wholly wrote; "Lover", "Cornelia Street", and "Daylight". The hip-hop producer Sounwave co-wrote and co-produced "London Boy", the singer Brendon Urie co-wrote "Me!", and the musician St. Vincent (credited as Annie Clark) co-wrote "Cruel Summer".

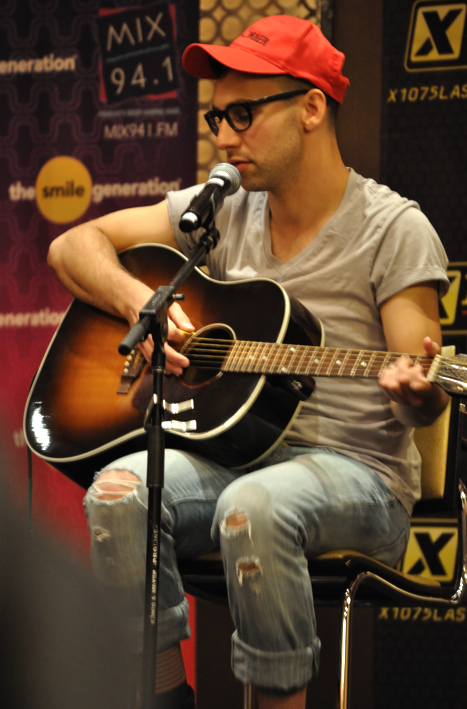
Jack Antonoff (pictured) co-produced 11 tracks for Lover.

While recording, Swift revisited musical styles with which she had earlier experimented. While she associated Reputation's musical style, devoid of acoustic instruments, with imagery of "nighttime cityscape ... old warehouse buildings that had been deserted and factory spaces", she conceptualized Lover as "a barn wood floor and some ripped curtains flowing in the breeze, and fields of flowers"; the songs on Lover use many acoustic instruments. Swift recorded her vocals as though she were performing live, stating much of the album is nearly whole takes. In publications' reviews, music critics categorized Lover as primarily a pop album with a 1980s-influenced sound combining synth-pop, dream pop, and pop rock. Will Hodgkinson of The Times considered it both a pop and country album. Compared to the dark, hip hop tones of its predecessor, Lover's musical styles are brighter, more lighthearted, and atmospheric. The tracks are of varying tempo, and are built on straightforward song structures with piano melodies, rock arrangements, and standard chord progressions; a few experiment with styles and song structures that were new to Swift.

Antonoff co-produced 11 tracks, all of which were recorded at Electric Lady Studios in New York City; "Paper Rings", "London Boy", and "Daylight" were additionally recorded at Metropolis Studios in London; the first two tracks, and "Cruel Summer" and "I Think He Knows", were additionally recorded at Conway Recording Studios in Los Angeles. Antonoff's production is characterized by 1980s drums, atmospheric synthesizers, and reverbed beats, exploring eclectic styles across genres including synth-pop, punk, folk rock, and quiet storm. Because of Antonoff's 1980s-style production, some critics commented Lover expands on the 1980s synth-pop sound of 1989. Billboard journalist Jason Lipshutz commented Lover is not an expansion on 1989's sound but a more-ambitious record that is larger in scope. Swift conceptualized tracks like "Lover" and "Paper Rings" as songs that might have been played in a 1970s wedding reception; as such, these tracks use retro instruments to bring forth the timeless feel she desired. For "Lover", Swift and Antonoff used instruments that, according to Swift, were invented before the 1970s; it is a waltzing-tempo track combining indie folk and alternative country with acoustic guitar, percussion, and pizzicato strings. "Paper Rings" is a gleeful new wave-influenced pop punk track with influences from rockabilly and 1980s pop.

"The Archer"
Many songs on Lover have a 1980s-influenced production consisting of atmospheric synthesizers and drums, as demonstrated in "The Archer".

Many songs produced with Antonoff have a radio-friendly pop production. "Cruel Summer" is a 1980s-influenced, synth-pop song with pulsating synthesizers and distorted vocals, and "London Boy" is a bubblegum pop song with layered synthesizers and repeated beats. The upbeat, electropop and R&B track "I Think He Knows" features influences of funk with Swift's falsetto vocals over guitars, a deep bass, and a marching beat. Despite its lyrics about a painful heartbreak, "Death by a Thousand Cuts" has an upbeat production with a recurring guitar line, quivering synthesizers, and faint church bells with vocal harmonies in the background. The ballads "The Archer", "Cornelia Street", and "Daylight" are characterized by dense, atmospheric synthesizers; the first of which combines dream pop and synth-pop with steady kick drum beats throughout. "Soon You'll Get Better" and "False God", which were produced with Antonoff, feature subtler production compared to the dominant uptempo sound. "Soon You'll Get Better" is a country ballad featuring slide guitars and the Dixie Chicks contributing background harmonies, banjo, and fiddle. "False God" combines elements of jazz, trap, neo-soul, and 1980s R&B; Swift sings over hiccupping vocal samples and a lone saxophone line.

Little co-produced four tracks on Lover; these were recorded at Electric Lady Studios in New York, Golden Age Studios in Los Angeles, and Golden Age West in Auckland, New Zealand. Swift had first met Little at a Broods concert in Los Angeles; they got acquainted at the New Zealand show of her Reputation Stadium Tour. Shortly after, Swift invited Little to New York to record songs with her; "Me!" is one of the first songs they created together. "Me!", which features Brendon Urie of Panic! at the Disco, contains pop hooks, and the horns and marching band drums in the refrain evoke a 1960s big band sound. "Miss Americana & the Heartbreak Prince" is at atmospheric, gloomy, synth-pop track with shouting cheerleaders' voice in the background. The synth-pop tunes "The Man" and "You Need to Calm Down" feature pulsating synthesizers; "The Man" is built on a pulsating drum beat and "You Need to Calm Down" features cascading vocal echoes in the refrain.

The three tracks Swift produced with Bell and Dukes, which were recorded at Electric Feel Studios in Los Angeles, have an experimental quality. The opening track "I Forgot That You Existed" is a lighthearted post-tropical house tune that is built on piano and finger snaps. The power ballad "Afterglow" has a slow-building melody consisting of slow bass and Swift's falsetto vocals. Some critics considered the penultimate track "It's Nice to Have a Friend" as the album's most original and experimental song. The song includes a sample of "Summer in the South" from the Toronto-based Regent Park School of Music's album Parkscapes; it has a sparse production with steelpans, harps, and tubular bells; and is punctuated by a trumpet solo and church bells near the middle. Swift said she wrote the track with only verses, and was more focused on the "vibe and feeling", contrasting her usual songwriting with a clear refrain and structure. Recording wrapped on February 24, 2019; a sample of Cautious Clay's song "Cold War" used for "London Boy" was approved in June that year.

== Release and promotion ==
=== Title and artwork ===
Swift initially considered choosing Daylight as the album's title but scrapped the idea because she thought it was too on-the-nose. She picked Lover as the title because she felt it better represents the overall theme and is "more elastic as a concept"; songs such as "You Need to Calm Down", which is about LGBT rights, could align with this concept. Colombian photographer and collage artist Valheria Rocha, who worked with Swift on the album's art direction, photographed and edited the album's cover art. The cover depicts Swift with sapphire hair tips and a pink, glittery heart shape on her right eye in front of colorful, pink clouds. Some media commented the artwork evokes the atmosphere of summer and music festivals.

Swift used the bright, pastel colors of the cover art in her social media posts and clothing during promotion of Lover, departing from the dark, black-and-white art and aesthetic of Reputation. In an article for Entertainment Weekly, Emma Madden said Lover's cover art looks like "a fan-made aesthetic post on Tumblr", and called it part of the emerging trend of "kitschy album artwork". By using cover art that deliberately looks like a fan-made product rather than art commissioned from professional graphic designers, Lover brought "a level of iconicness and relatability" to Swift's audience because, according to Rocha, they could create their own versions of the cover art.

=== Marketing ===
Whereas Swift avoided social media and public appearances during promotion of Reputation, she embarked on an extensive promotional campaign for Lover on social media, televised events, and press interviews. Media speculation on Swift's follow-up to Reputation arose when she appeared at the 2019 iHeartRadio Music Awards in March, where she was adorned with butterfly motifs and pastel tones, the aesthetic she later used in her clothing for public appearances. Her social media posts showed her outgoing, comfortable persona, departing from the dark, antagonistic image she adopted for Reputation. Swift conducted interviews with publications including Entertainment Weekly, The Guardian, Vogue, and Rolling Stone, where she openly spoke about her adjusted personal life. A few weeks before the album's release, Swift invited a select group of fans to private Secret Sessions listening parties in London, Nashville, and Los Angeles; she had hosted similar sessions for 1989 and Reputation. She also gave interviews on the American morning television programs CBS Sunday Morning and Good Morning America, and the talk shows The Ellen DeGeneres Show and The Tonight Show Starring Jimmy Fallon.

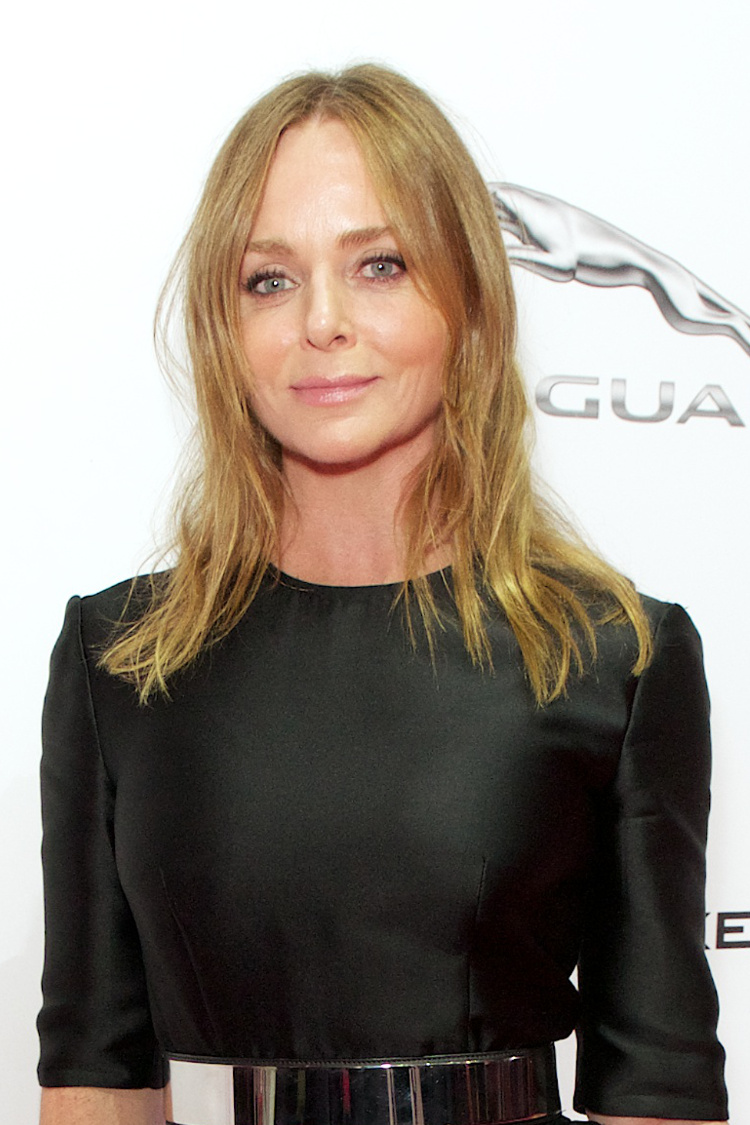
Swift collaborated with Stella McCartney (pictured) on a Lover-themed merchandise collection.

Swift promoted Lover with corporate tie-ins and promotional deals, including a merchandise deal with Capital One, airplay deals with SiriusXM and iHeartMedia, a deal with YouTube Music with Swift hosting a live stream on the platform, an Amazon deal featuring images of Swift on packaging and an exclusive concert for Amazon Prime users, and a Target Corporation deal to distribute four deluxe editions of Lover on CD; the deluxe editions were also available on Swift's website. Each deluxe edition contains a CD with two bonus audio memos, a blank journal, a poster and different bonus content of Swift's old journal entries and photos. She also collaborated with the English fashion designer Stella McCartney on a limited-edition merchandise collection.

Lover was released on both digital and physical formats on August 23, 2019, through Republic Records; it was her first album after ending her 12-year contract with Big Machine Records, her first released on streaming from its first week, and the first whose master recording she owned. Leading up to the release, Swift was involved in a public dispute over the ownership of her Big Machine Records albums' master recordings. In a social media post on June 30, 2019, after Big Machine had been acquired by the talent manager Scooter Braun, Swift accused the label of having neglected her desire to acquire the master recordings and called the deal with Braun, whom she deemed an "incessant, manipulative [bully]", the "worst-case scenario". After Lover was released, Swift began implementing her plan to re-record her past albums.

Swift performed on many televised shows, starting with a performance of "Me!" with Brendon Urie at the 2019 Billboard Music Awards on May 1. She again performed the song with Urie on The Voice, and alone on Germany's Next Topmodel, The Graham Norton Show, and the French version of The Voice. At the 2019 MTV Video Music Awards, where she won three awards, Swift opened the show with a medley of "You Need to Calm Down" and "Lover". Swift later performed Lover songs on BBC Radio 1's Live Lounge, Saturday Night Live, NPR Music's Tiny Desk Concert, the Jingle Bell Ball 2019 in London, and iHeartRadio Z100's Jingle Ball in New York City. She also promoted the album on Nippon TV's Sukkiri Morning Show in Tokyo, Japan, held a fan event there, and at the Singles' Day Countdown Gala by Alibaba Group in Shanghai, China. She also participated in a Lover-themed fanmeeting event, hosted by Tencent Music and Universal Music China in Guangzhou.

At the 2019 American Music Awards, at which Swift was honored as the Artist of the Decade, she performed a medley of "The Man", "Lover", and her past singles. On May 17, 2020, ABC aired a concert special titled Taylor Swift: City of Lover, which was filmed at her September 2019 one-off concert in Paris. A planned concert tour, Lover Fest, which was due to begin in mid-2020 and included four shows in the United States, ten shows in Europe, and two shows in Brazil, was cancelled due to the COVID-19 pandemic.

=== Singles ===
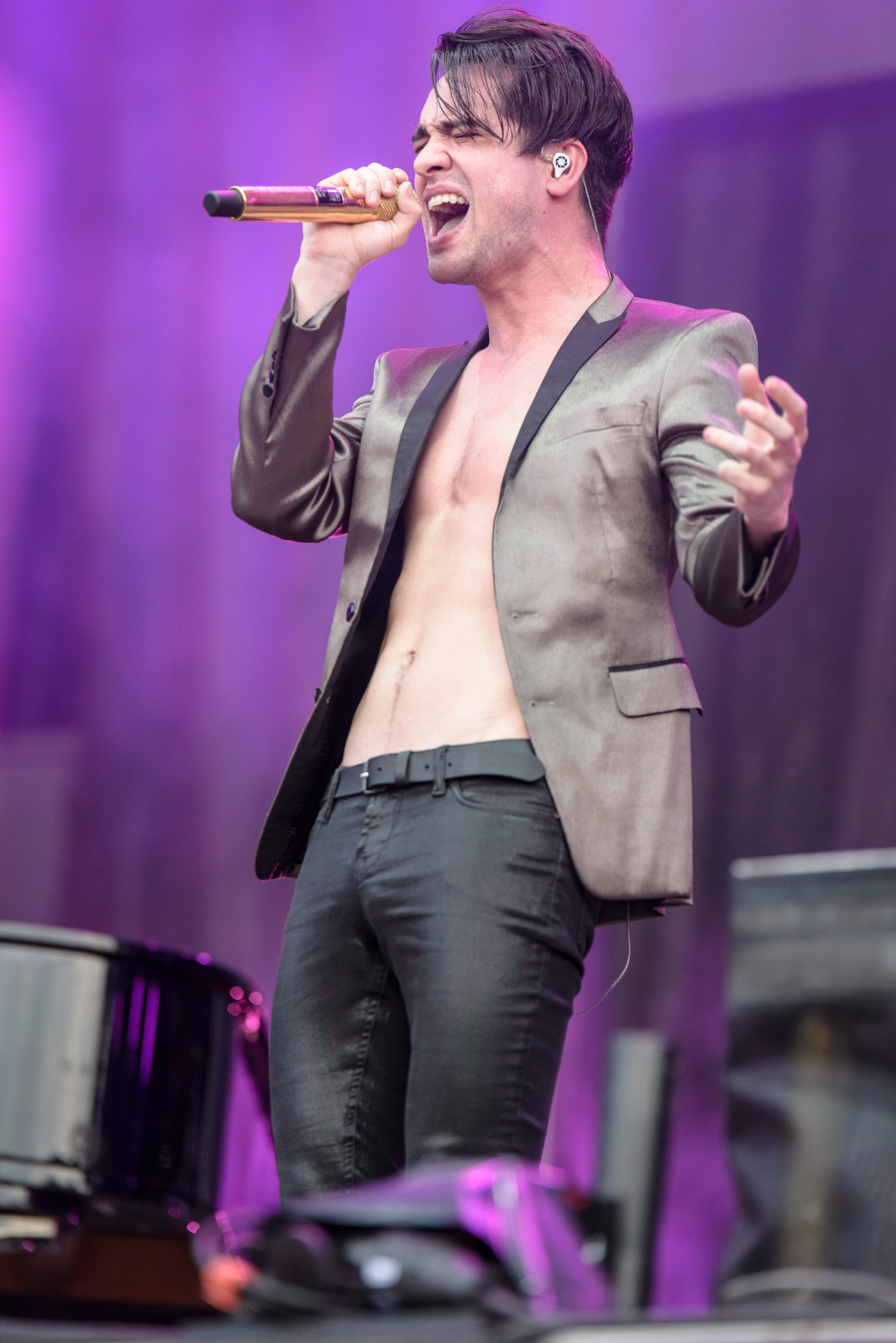
Brendon Urie (pictured) featured on the lead single "Me!" and performed it with Swift at the 2019 Billboard Music Awards.

Three singles preceded Lover. Swift released the first, "Me!" featuring Brendon Urie of Panic! at the Disco, on April 26, having commissioned a large butterfly mural in a Nashville neighborhood and a social-media countdown. The second single "You Need to Calm Down" was released on June 14 after Swift encouraged her fans to call for the passing of the Equality Act on her social media feeds; the media viewed this release as Swift's intention for the release to coincide with Pride Month. "Lover" was released as the third single on August 16. All three singles peaked in the top ten of the Billboard Hot 100, and the first two peaked at number two. "Me!" broke the record for the largest single-week jump when it rose from number 100 to number two after one week. "The Archer" was released as a promotional single on July 23. A fourth single, "The Man", was released on January 27, 2020. After Swift embarked on the Eras Tour in 2023, "Cruel Summer" resurged in popularity and was released to radio on June 20, 2023, as the fifth single from Lover; it topped the Billboard Hot 100.

=== Media response ===
Lover received extensive media coverage; the BBC's Nick Levine wrote; "if it doesn't become her sixth in succession to top the Billboard 200, it would be a major music industry shock". Some publications noted the extensive promotional campaign was old-fashioned compared to the emerging trend of surprise album releases in the digital era; Rolling Stone's Elias Leight commented Swift was the last-remaining pop star to rely on radio push and corporate tie-ins to promote albums. Her first album released on streaming platforms from the beginning, it was noted in some articles as a sign Swift had abandoned her anti-streaming stance. (Note: Swift had pulled her previous albums from streaming services until June 2017. Her previous album Reputation was withheld from streaming services during its first three weeks of release.) Because of Swift's Billboard 200 record of having four albums sell over one million copies each, (Note: Swift is the first artist in Billboard 200 chart history to have four albums each sell one million copies in their first week; Speak Now (2010), Red (2012), 1989 (2014), and Reputation (2017).) some journalists debated whether she would achieve the feat the fifth time, and whether streaming would impact its sales figures.

Some reviewers said they thought Lover would perform well on charts even if critical reviews were negative, and that it was also a means for Swift to rebuild her public image after the Reputation controversies, and the dispute with Big Machine and Braun. Kate Knibbs from The Ringer wrote; "as Swift tries to control the narrative, it is a reminder that ... Swift has achieved an American Dream—she's too big to fail". Billboard's Andrew Unterberger, noting the diverse styles and themes of the four songs released prior to Lover—"Me!", "You Need to Calm Down", "The Archer", and "Lover"—said Swift released Lover to focus on her artistic merit on her own terms, and not because she wanted to control her image. In the September 2019 issue of Entertainment Weekly, Maura Johnston commented although Swift's blurring of the line between the personal and the promotional, and although her social media posts might prompt tabloid gossip, Lover should stand the test of time with its best songs.

== Critical reception ==
Professional ratings
Aggregate scores
Source	Rating
AnyDecentMusic?	7.2/10
Metacritic	79/100
Review scores
Source	Rating
AllMusic	4/5 stars
The A.V. Club	A−
The Daily Telegraph	4/5 stars
Entertainment Weekly	B+
The Guardian	3/5 stars
The Independent	4/5 stars
NME	4/5 stars
Pitchfork	7.1/10
Rolling Stone	4/5 stars
The Times	4/5 stars

In mainstream publications, Lover received generally positive reviews from music critics. At review-aggregating website Metacritic, which assigns a normalized rating out of 100 to reviews from mainstream publications, the album received a mean score of 79, which is based on 26 reviews.

Most reviewers commended the album's themes of positivity and emotional intimacy. Many critics, including Jon Caramanica in The New York Times, Neil McCormick in The Daily Telegraph, and Robert Christgau in his Consumer Guide column, welcomed Lover as Swift's return-to-form, praised her emotional songwriting ability, and said compared to Reputation's antagonistic themes about celebrity, Lover is a sign of Swift's embracing of forward-looking perspectives. Others such as Mikael Wood from the Los Angeles Times and Annie Zaleski from The A.V. Club commented on its emotional maturity that represents Swift's grown-up perspectives.

Praise for the track list's length and diverse musical styles was a bit more reserved. Those complimentary of Lover welcomed its disparate styles as a representation of Swift's creative freedom. Vanity Fair critic Erin Vanderhoof said Lover's production "[ties] together a lot of the best impulses in recent pop, in a way that feels like a road map for [pop music's] survival". Nick Catucci in Rolling Stone called the album "evolutionary rather than revolutionary", and appreciated its "free and unhurried" styles. Others, taking issue with its length, commented although Lover is a solid album, it could have been a better record with some refinements. In The Observer, Kitty Empire deemed this "a partial retrenchment until Swift decides what to do next". Paste's Claire Martin was critical, deeming the music unimpressive and the lyrics, despite their heartwarming nature, "lacking any profound meaning".

Some critics viewed the album as a culmination of Swift's strengths as a singer-songwriter on her past albums, with particular comparisons to Red (2012); Schwartz and Anna Gaca from Pitchfork also highlighted the personal lyricism that recalls Speak Now (2010). In The Guardian, Alexis Petridis viewed Lover as a testament to Swift's songwriting abilities but commented the genre-spanning styles feel like "consolidation, not progress", and a conservative effort to maintain her commercial success. Carl Wilson from Slate wrote although Lover is a sophisticated album, it is held back by Swift's efforts to satisfy her audience.

=== Year-end lists ===
Many publications ranked Lover in their lists of the best albums of 2019. It appeared on the top-tens of lists by Billboard, People, and USA Today. Some publications, including American Songwriter and MTV, included it in their unranked lists. In individual critics' list, the album was ranked the best album of 2019 by Sheffield and Willman, and it was ranked within the top ten by Zaleski and Wood.

Select year-end rankings
Publication	List	Rank	Ref.
Billboard	The 50 Best Albums of 2019	3	
The Guardian	The 50 Best Albums of 2019	29	
The Independent	The 50 Best Albums of 2019	19	
The Music	Best Albums of 2019	7	
The New York Times	Best Albums of 2019	14	
NME	The 50 Best Albums of 2019	41	
People	The 10 Best Albums of 2019	3	
Q	Top 50 Albums of 2019	35	
Rolling Stone	50 Best Albums of 2019	4	
USA Today	The 10 Best Albums of 2019	3	

== Commercial performance ==
Variety, citing Republic Records, reported that Lover sold nearly one million copies before its release. In the United States, the album sold around 450,000 copies in its first day and debuted at number one on the Billboard 200 with a first-week tally of 867,000 album-equivalent units, of which 679,000 were pure sales. It is Swift's sixth number-one album and made her the first female artist to have six albums sell more than 500,000 copies each in one week. In its opening week, Lover outsold all of the other 199 albums on the chart combined, becoming the first album to do so since Swift's Reputation (2017). All of the album's 18 tracks simultaneously charted on the Billboard Hot 100, breaking the record for the most simultaneous chart entries for a female artist. With Lover, Swift returned to the top of the Billboard Artist 100 chart for a thirty-seventh week, extending her record as the longest-running number-one act. By May 2026, the album had spent 350 weeks on the Billboard 200 chart.

The Recording Industry Association of America (RIAA) certified Lover platinum, denoting one million album-equivalent units, after four weeks of release. The only million-selling album of 2019 in the United States, it sold 1.085 million pure copies, both physical and digital, becoming the year's best-selling album. It was the fourth time Swift had the best-selling album of a calendar year in the United States, after Fearless (2009), 1989 (2014), and Reputation (2017). Combining singles sales and streaming, Lover sold 2.191 million units throughout the year. The album surpassed two million copies sold in the United States by January 2024, becoming Swift's 10th album to do so. After Swift embarked on the Eras Tour in April 2023, Lover re-entered the top 10 of the Billboard 200. The RIAA certified Lover seven-times platinum in September 2025 for surpassing seven million units.

Lover peaked atop the charts in the English-speaking countries, including Australia, Canada, Ireland, New Zealand, and the United Kingdom (including Scotland). It made Swift the artist with the most number-one albums (five) of the 2010s decade in Australia and the first female artist in the same decade to have four number-one albums in both the United Kingdom and Ireland. In March 2024, following the Australian dates of the Eras Tour, Lover again topped the chart in Australia. The album was certified nine-times platinum in Canada, seven-times platinum in New Zealand, quadruple platinum in Australia, and triple platinum in the United Kingdom.

In continental Europe, Lover reached number one in Latvia, Lithuania, the Netherlands, Norway, Portugal, Spain, and Sweden. The album was certified triple platinum in Denmark and Poland, double platinum in Austria, and platinum in Belgium, France, Germany, Italy, Norway, and Singapore. In China, it became the first international album to sell more than one million units within its first release week, making Swift the first international artist to have three million-selling albums, after 1989 and Reputation. Lover sold more than 3.2 million copies worldwide in 2019, becoming the year's best-selling album by a solo artist and the second overall, behind Japanese group Arashi's greatest hits album 5x20 All the Best!! 1999–2019. The International Federation of the Phonographic Industry (IFPI) recognized Swift as the Global Recording Artist of 2019, making her the first female artist to twice earn that honor—her first being in 2014. As of April 2026, Lover is the eighth most-streamed album of all time on Spotify.

== Legacy ==
=== Accolades ===
Lover has received various awards and nominations, including Favorite Album of the Year at the People's Choice Awards, Best International Artist at the ARIA Awards, and two album-sales awards at the BuzzAngle Music Awards. At the 2019 American Music Awards, at which Swift was honored as Artist of the Decade, Lover won Favorite Pop/Rock Album. Winning four other awards, Swift was the most-awarded artist of the night, and with 29 wins was the most-awarded in AMAs history. The music videos for Lover's singles won four awards out of twelve nominations at the MTV Video Music Awards; in 2019, "You Need to Calm Down" won Video of the Year and Video for Good, and "Me!" won Best Visual Effects; and in 2020, "The Man" won Best Direction.

At the 62nd Annual Grammy Awards in 2020, Lover was nominated for Best Pop Vocal Album, which went to When We All Fall Asleep, Where Do We Go? by Billie Eilish. Lover's singles "You Need to Calm Down" and "Lover" were respectively nominated for Best Pop Solo Performance (lost to "Truth Hurts" by Lizzo) and Song of the Year (lost to "Bad Guy" by Eilish). Lover won Pop Album of the Year at the iHeartRadio Music Awards, an award in Sales and Marketing (Packaging Campaign) by the American Advertising Federation in Nashville, and was nominated for Top Billboard 200 Album at the Billboard Music Awards. The album won Album of the Year (Western) at the Japan Gold Disc Awards, Best Selling Album (English) at Hong Kong's RTHK International Pop Poll Awards, and a Music Jacket Creative Award at Japan's CD Shop Awards.

=== Retrospectives ===
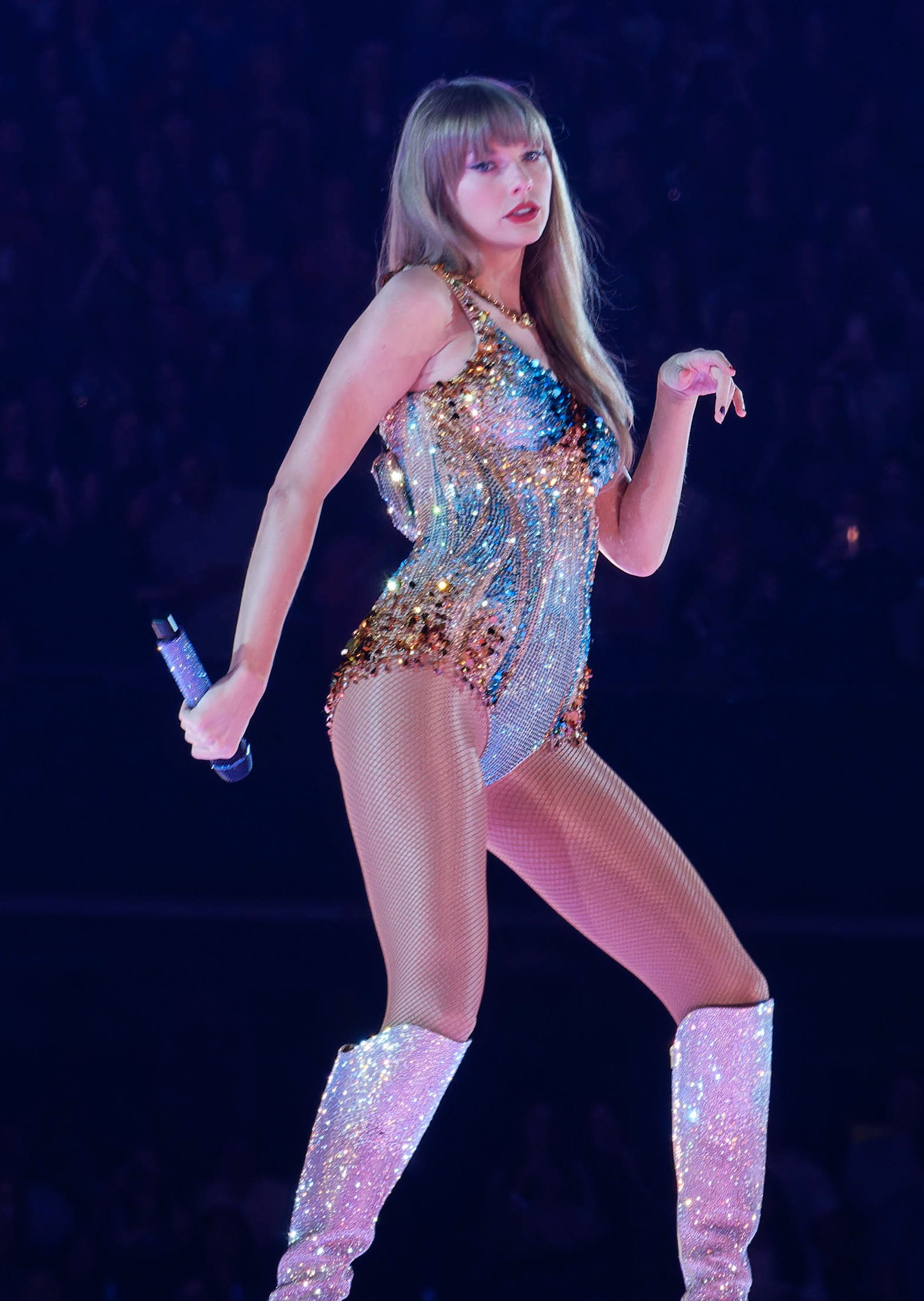
Swift performing the Lover act of her Eras Tour (2023)

In January 2020, Swift released a Netflix documentary titled Miss Americana, which was directed by Lana Wilson. The documentary, which is titled after the album's seventh track, chronicles the creation and promotion of Lover, and discusses it as an evolutionary phase in Swift's career. After the Lover Fest was cancelled due to the COVID-19 pandemic, in July 2020, without prior announcements, Swift released her eighth studio album, Folklore, 11 months after Lover's release. Journalists noted Lover as Swift's final album that was supported by a "long, fancy pop-album roll-out" before she began using surprise album releases, starting with Folklore. Following the cancellation of Lover Fest, Swift embarked on the Eras Tour (2023–2024) as her sixth headlining concert tour. The tour consisted of 10 acts, the first of which is a tribute to Lover.

Retrospective critical commentary has discussed ways Lover changed Swift's image and artistry from the antagonistic tone of Reputation. Several publications that ranked Lover as a weaker album in Swift's discography and deemed it an unnecessary course correction from Reputation included Consequence, Spin, and Entertainment Weekly. The Alternative Press upheld Swift's mature songwriting but said that the album's free-spirited sound was both "its blessing and its curse". Paste deemed Lover a "mixed bag" containing some songs that failed to demonstrate Swift's craftsmanship but said that as a "transitional work", it was a "perfect inflection point for [Swift, who] found herself caught between her defensive Kanye-beef era and the shimmering resurrection she'd construct throughout the pandemic".

In a USA Today article commemorating Lover's second anniversary, David Oliver and Hannah Yasharoff lamented the canceled tour and called the album Swift's "lost masterpiece" that represents her artistic maturity and autonomy. After its songs featured on the Amazon Prime Video series The Summer I Turned Pretty in June 2022, Lover re-entered the Billboard 200 chart's top 40. "It's Nice to Have a Friend" featured prominently in the promotion of M3GAN, a 2023 horror film.

=== Copyright lawsuit ===
On August 23, 2022, at a Tennessee federal court, the author Teresa La Dart filed a copyright infringement complaint claiming that a number of creative elements of the companion book bundled with the deluxe CD editions of Lover were copied from La Dart's 2010 book that is also titled Lover: the pastel aesthetic, a photograph "in a downward pose", and the book's diary format with "interspersed photographs and writings". La Dart's lawyer said Swift owed "[in] excess of one million dollars" in damages. In March 2023, Swift's attorneys requested a dismissal, calling La Dart's claims "entirely meritless" and "woefully deficient". On July 27, 2023, Billboard reported that La Dart voluntarily withdrew the case without any settlement.

== Track listing ==
Standard edition
No.	Title	Writer(s)	Producer(s)	Length
1.	"I Forgot That You Existed"	Taylor Swift; Louis Bell; Adam King Feeney	Swift; Bell; Frank Dukes	2:51
2.	"Cruel Summer"	Swift; Jack Antonoff; Annie Clark	Swift; Antonoff	2:58
3.	"Lover"	Swift	Swift; Antonoff	3:41
4.	"The Man"	Swift; Joel Little	Swift; Little	3:10
5.	"The Archer"	Swift; Antonoff	Swift; Antonoff	3:31
6.	"I Think He Knows"	Swift; Antonoff	Swift; Antonoff	2:53
7.	"Miss Americana & the Heartbreak Prince"	Swift; Little	Swift; Little	3:54
8.	"Paper Rings"	Swift; Antonoff	Swift; Antonoff	3:42
9.	"Cornelia Street"	Swift	Swift; Antonoff	4:47
10.	"Death by a Thousand Cuts"	Swift; Antonoff	Swift; Antonoff	3:19
11.	"London Boy"	Swift; Antonoff; Cautious Clay; Mark Anthony Spears	Swift; Antonoff; Sounwave^{[a]}	3:10
12.	"Soon You'll Get Better" (featuring the Chicks)	Swift; Antonoff	Swift; Antonoff	3:22
13.	"False God"	Swift; Antonoff	Swift; Antonoff	3:20
14.	"You Need to Calm Down"	Swift; Little	Swift; Little	2:51
15.	"Afterglow"	Swift; Bell; Feeney	Swift; Bell; Dukes	3:43
16.	"Me!" (featuring Brendon Urie of Panic! at the Disco)	Swift; Little; Urie	Swift; Little	3:13
17.	"It's Nice to Have a Friend"	Swift; Bell; Feeney	Swift; Bell; Dukes	2:30
18.	"Daylight"	Swift	Swift; Antonoff	4:53
Total length:				61:48

Deluxe edition
No.	Title	Length
19.	"I Forgot That You Existed" (Piano/Vocal)	3:30
20.	"Lover" (Piano/Vocal)	5:39
Total length:		70:57

=== Notes ===
- ^{^[a]} signifies a co-producer
- "London Boy" contains a sample of "Cold War" by Cautious Clay.

== Personnel ==
Musicians

- Taylor Swift – vocals, writer, percussion (track 8)
- Jack Antonoff – keyboards (tracks: 2, 3, 5, 6, 8–13, 18); writer (tracks: 2, 5, 6, 8, 10–13); piano (tracks: 3, 8, 9, 12, 18); live drums (tracks: 2, 3, 8, 9); acoustic guitars (tracks: 3, 6, 8, 12); electric guitars (tracks: 6, 8, 18); percussion, bass (tracks: 3, 8, 11); vocoder (track 2); synthesizers (track 10); guitar (track 10); Wurlitzer (track 12); background vocals (track 8)
- Louis Bell – writer (tracks: 1, 15, 17); keyboards (track 1)
- Frank Dukes – guitar (tracks: 1, 15, 17)
- Joel Little – writer, keyboards (tracks: 4, 7, 14, 16); synths, guitar (track 16)
- Laura Sisk – background vocals (track 13)
- Annie Clark – writer, guitar (track 2)
- Serafin Aguilar – trumpet (track 1)
- David Urquidi – saxophone (track 1)
- Steve Hughes – trombone (track 1)
- Michael Riddleberger – live drums (tracks: 2, 13)
- Sounwave – writer (track 11)
- Cautious Clay – writer (track 11)
- Sean Hutchinson – live drums (track 11)
- Mikey Freedom Hart – keyboards (track 11); background vocals (track 13)
- Evan Smith – keyboards, saxophones (tracks: 11, 13)
- Emily Strayer – banjo (track 12)
- Martie Maguire – fiddle (track 12)
- The Dixie Chicks – featured artist (track 12)
- Brandon Bost – background vocals (track 13)
- Cassidy Ladden – background vocals (track 13)
- Ken Lewis – background vocals (track 13)
- Matthew Tavares – guitar (tracks: 15, 17)
- Brendon Urie – featured artist, writer (track 16)

Technicians

- Taylor Swift – executive producer, producer (all tracks)
- Jack Antonoff – producer, programming, recording (tracks: 2, 3, 5, 6, 8–13, 18)
- Louis Bell – producer, programming, recording (tracks: 1, 15, 17); keyboards (track 1)
- Frank Dukes – producer, programming (tracks: 1, 15, 17)
- Joel Little – producer, recording, drum programming (tracks: 4, 7, 14, 16)
- Laura Sisk – recording (tracks: 2, 3, 5, 6, 8–13, 18)
- Sounwave – co-producer (track 11)
- Şerban Ghenea – mixing
- John Hanes – mix engineer
- Randy Merrill – mastering
- Grant Strumwasser – assistant (track 1)
- John Rooney – assistant (tracks: 2–6, 9–13, 18)
- Jon Sher – assistant (tracks: 2, 6, 8, 11)
- Nick Mills – assistant (tracks: 8, 11, 18)
- Joe Harrison – guitar (tracks: 1, 15, 17)

Design and art

- Taylor Swift – journal entries (deluxe), personal photographies (deluxe), packaging creative direction
- Valheria Rocha – photography
- Andrea Swift – personal photographies (deluxe)
- Scott Swift – personal photographies (deluxe)
- Joseph Cassel – wardrobe stylist
- Riawna Capri – hair
- Lorrie Turk – makeup
- Josh & Bethany Newman – packaging art direction
- Parker Foote – packaging design
- Jin Kim – packaging design
- Ryon Nishimori – packaging design
- Abby Murdock – packaging design

== Charts ==
=== Weekly charts ===
Weekly chart performance
Chart (2019–2023)	Peak position
Argentine Albums (CAPIF)	1
Australian Albums (ARIA)	1
Austrian Albums (Ö3 Austria)	2
Belgian Albums (Ultratop Flanders)	1
Belgian Albums (Ultratop Wallonia)	4
Canadian Albums (Billboard)	1
Croatian International Albums (HDU)	3
Czech Albums (ČNS IFPI)	2
Danish Albums (Hitlisten)	3
Dutch Albums (Album Top 100)	1
Estonian Albums (Eesti Tipp-40)	1
Finnish Albums (Suomen virallinen lista)	4
French Albums (SNEP)	5
German Albums (Offizielle Top 100)	2
Greek Albums (IFPI)	1
Hungarian Albums (MAHASZ)	8
Icelandic Albums (Tónlistinn)	18
Irish Albums (Official Charts)	1
Italian Albums (FIMI)	2
Japan Hot Albums (Billboard Japan)	3
Japanese Albums (Oricon)	3
Latvian Albums (LAIPA)	1
Lithuanian Albums (AGATA)	1
Mexican Albums (Top 100 Mexico)	1
New Zealand Albums (RMNZ)	1
Norwegian Albums (VG-lista)	1
Polish Albums (ZPAV)	5
Portuguese Albums (AFP)	1
Scottish Albums (Official Charts)	1
Slovak Albums (ČNS IFPI)	1
South African Albums (RISA)	2
South Korean Albums (Gaon)	36
Spanish Albums (Promusicae)	1
Swedish Albums (Sverigetopplistan)	1
Swiss Albums (Schweizer Hitparade)	2
Swiss Albums (SNEP Romandie)	1
UK Albums (Official Charts)	1
US Billboard 200	1
US Indie Store Album Sales (Billboard)	1

=== Year-end charts ===
2019 year-end chart performance
Chart (2019)	Position
Australian Albums (ARIA)	6
Austrian Albums (Ö3 Austria)	64
Belgian Albums (Ultratop Flanders)	28
Belgian Albums (Ultratop Wallonia)	158
Canadian Albums (Billboard)	14
Danish Albums (Hitlisten)	99
Dutch Albums (Album Top 100)	52
French Albums (SNEP)	179
German Albums (Offizielle Top 100)	88
Irish Albums (IRMA)	23
Japan Hot Albums (Billboard)	98
Japanese Albums (Oricon)	84
Latvian Albums (LAIPA)	61
Mexican Albums (AMPROFON)	10
New Zealand Albums (RMNZ)	14
Portuguese Albums (AFP)	36
Spanish Albums (PROMUSICAE)	50
Swiss Albums (Schweizer Hitparade)	73
UK Albums (OCC)	24
US Billboard 200	4
Worldwide Albums (IFPI)	2

2020 year-end chart performance
Chart (2020)	Position
Australian Albums (ARIA)	15
Belgian Albums (Ultratop Flanders)	44
Canadian Albums (Billboard)	13
Croatian International Albums (HDU)	14
Danish Albums (Hitlisten)	93
Irish Albums (IRMA)	29
New Zealand Albums (RMNZ)	22
Spanish Albums (PROMUSICAE)	77
UK Albums (OCC)	37
US Billboard 200	15

2021 year-end chart performance
Chart (2021)	Position
Australian Albums (ARIA)	37
Belgian Albums (Ultratop Flanders)	107
Canadian Albums (Billboard)	38
Irish Albums (IRMA)	44
Spanish Albums (PROMUSICAE)	87
UK Albums (OCC)	83
US Billboard 200	61

2022 year-end chart performance
Chart (2022)	Position
Australian Albums (ARIA)	26
Belgian Albums (Ultratop Flanders)	59
Canadian Albums (Billboard)	34
UK Albums (OCC)	43
US Billboard 200	49

2023 year-end chart performance
Chart (2023)	Position
Australian Albums (ARIA)	8
Austrian Albums (Ö3 Austria)	13
Belgian Albums (Ultratop Flanders)	19
Belgian Albums (Ultratop Wallonia)	130
Canadian Albums (Billboard)	10
Croatian International Albums (HDU)	25
Danish Albums (Hitlisten)	34
Dutch Albums (Album Top 100)	12
German Albums (Offizielle Top 100)	42
Hungarian Albums (MAHASZ)	31
Icelandic Albums (Tónlistinn)	68
Italian Albums (FIMI)	88
New Zealand Albums (RMNZ)	11
Portuguese Albums (AFP)	24
Swedish Albums (Sverigetopplistan)	59
Swiss Albums (Schweizer Hitparade)	43
UK Albums (OCC)	11
US Billboard 200	9

2024 year-end chart performance
Chart (2024)	Position
Australian Albums (ARIA)	7
Austrian Albums (Ö3 Austria)	7
Belgian Albums (Ultratop Flanders)	13
Belgian Albums (Ultratop Wallonia)	110
Canadian Albums (Billboard)	9
Croatian International Albums (HDU)	18
Danish Albums (Hitlisten)	27
Dutch Albums (Album Top 100)	16
German Albums (Offizielle Top 100)	10
Global Albums (IFPI)	11
Hungarian Albums (MAHASZ)	45
Icelandic Albums (Tónlistinn)	72
Portuguese Albums (AFP)	17
Swedish Albums (Sverigetopplistan)	46
Swiss Albums (Schweizer Hitparade)	13
UK Albums (OCC)	17
US Billboard 200	9

2025 year-end chart performance
Chart (2025)	Position
Australian Albums (ARIA)	47
Austrian Albums (Ö3 Austria)	36
Belgian Albums (Ultratop Flanders)	57
Canadian Albums (Billboard)	29
Dutch Albums (Album Top 100)	96
German Albums (Offizielle Top 100)	37
Swiss Albums (Schweizer Hitparade)	67
UK Albums (OCC)	62
US Billboard 200	33

== Certifications ==
Certifications, with pure sales where available
Region	Certification	Certified units/sales
Australia (ARIA)	4× Platinum	280,000^{‡}
Austria (IFPI Austria)	2× Platinum	30,000^{‡}
Belgium (BRMA)	Platinum	20,000^{‡}
Canada (Music Canada)	9× Platinum	720,000^{‡}
Denmark (IFPI Danmark)	3× Platinum	60,000^{‡}
France (SNEP)	Platinum	100,000^{‡}
Germany (BVMI)	Platinum	200,000^{‡}
Italy (FIMI)	Platinum	50,000^{‡}
New Zealand (RMNZ)	7× Platinum	105,000^{‡}
Norway (IFPI Norway)	Platinum	20,000^{‡}
Poland (ZPAV)	3× Platinum	60,000^{‡}
Portugal (AFP)	Gold	7,500^{^}
Singapore (RIAS)	Platinum	10,000^{*}
Spain (Promusicae)	Gold	20,000^{‡}
Switzerland (IFPI Switzerland)	Gold	10,000^{‡}
United Kingdom (BPI)	3× Platinum	900,000^{‡}
United States (RIAA)	7× Platinum	7,000,000^{‡}
^{*} Sales figures based on certification alone.^{^} Shipments figures based on certification alone.^{‡} Sales+streaming figures based on certification alone.

== See also ==
- List of 2019 albums
- List of Billboard 200 number-one albums of 2019
- List of number-one albums of 2019 (Australia)
- List of number-one albums of 2024 (Australia)
- List of number-one albums of 2019 (Belgium)
- List of number-one albums of 2019 (Canada)
- List of number-one albums of 2019 (Ireland)
- List of number-one albums from the 2010s (New Zealand)
- List of number-one albums of 2019 (Mexico)
- List of number-one albums in Norway
- List of number-one albums of 2019 (Scotland)
- List of number-one albums of 2019 (Sweden)
- List of UK Albums Chart number ones of the 2010s
- List of UK Album Downloads Chart number ones of the 2010s
- List of best-selling albums in China
