= Global Recording Artist of the Year =

Award for commercial success in music

- The IFPI trophy
- Awarded for: Most successful recording artist worldwide based on album-equivalent units
- Presented by: International Federation of the Phonographic Industry
- First award: January 2014
- Most recent winner: Taylor Swift (2025)

Highlights
- Most awards: Taylor Swift (6)

The Global Recording Artist of the Year is an award presented by the International Federation of the Phonographic Industry (IFPI) to honor the year's commercially best-performing musician, based on global album-equivalent units earned, which includes music downloads, streaming and physical sales. It has been awarded every year since January 2014, starting with the British boy band One Direction, who won the accolade for 2013. American singer-songwriter Taylor Swift is the biggest winner of the accolade, having won six times—in 2014, 2019, 2022, 2023, 2024, and 2025.

== Winners ==
The IFPI Global Recording Artist of the Year has been awarded every year since January 2014, with British boy band One Direction becoming the first act to receive the accolade for 2013. This success was attributed to the band's third studio album, Midnight Memories, which became the best-selling album of the year. Taylor Swift was awarded the Global Recording Artist of 2014 following her fifth studio album, 1989. It spawned two international number-one singles, "Shake It Off" and "Blank Space".

Adele received the award for the Global Recording Artist of 2015 with the release of her third studio album, 25. It was the best-selling album of the year, with its lead single, "Hello", reaching number one in nearly every country in which it charted. The Global Recording Artist of 2016 went to Drake, whose fourth studio album, Views, was the third best-selling album of the year. The album's second single, "One Dance", became the biggest digital song of the year.

Ed Sheeran received the award for 2017 with the release of his third studio album ÷, which included the singles "Shape of You", "Castle on the Hill", "Galway Girl", and "Perfect". He became the first recipient to have both the best-selling album and single of the year. Drake won the award again in 2018, which made him the first artist to win twice.

Swift matched Drake's achievement when she received the award again for 2019. Her seventh studio album, Lover, was the second best-selling album of 2019. The award for 2020 went to BTS. The band's fourth and fifth studio albums, Map of the Soul: 7 and Be, were the top two best-selling albums of the year. BTS became the first Asian act to win the award. The band repeated the feat for 2021, becoming the third artist—after Drake and Swift—to win the award twice, and the first to do so in consecutive years. Swift became the first artist to win thrice when she was awarded the Global Recording Artist of 2022, following the success of her tenth studio album Midnights. She claimed the award again in 2023, 2024, and 2025, the latter two of which saw her eleventh and twelfth studio albums The Tortured Poets Department and The Life of a Showgirl become the best-selling albums of their respective years.

== Annual top-10 artists ==
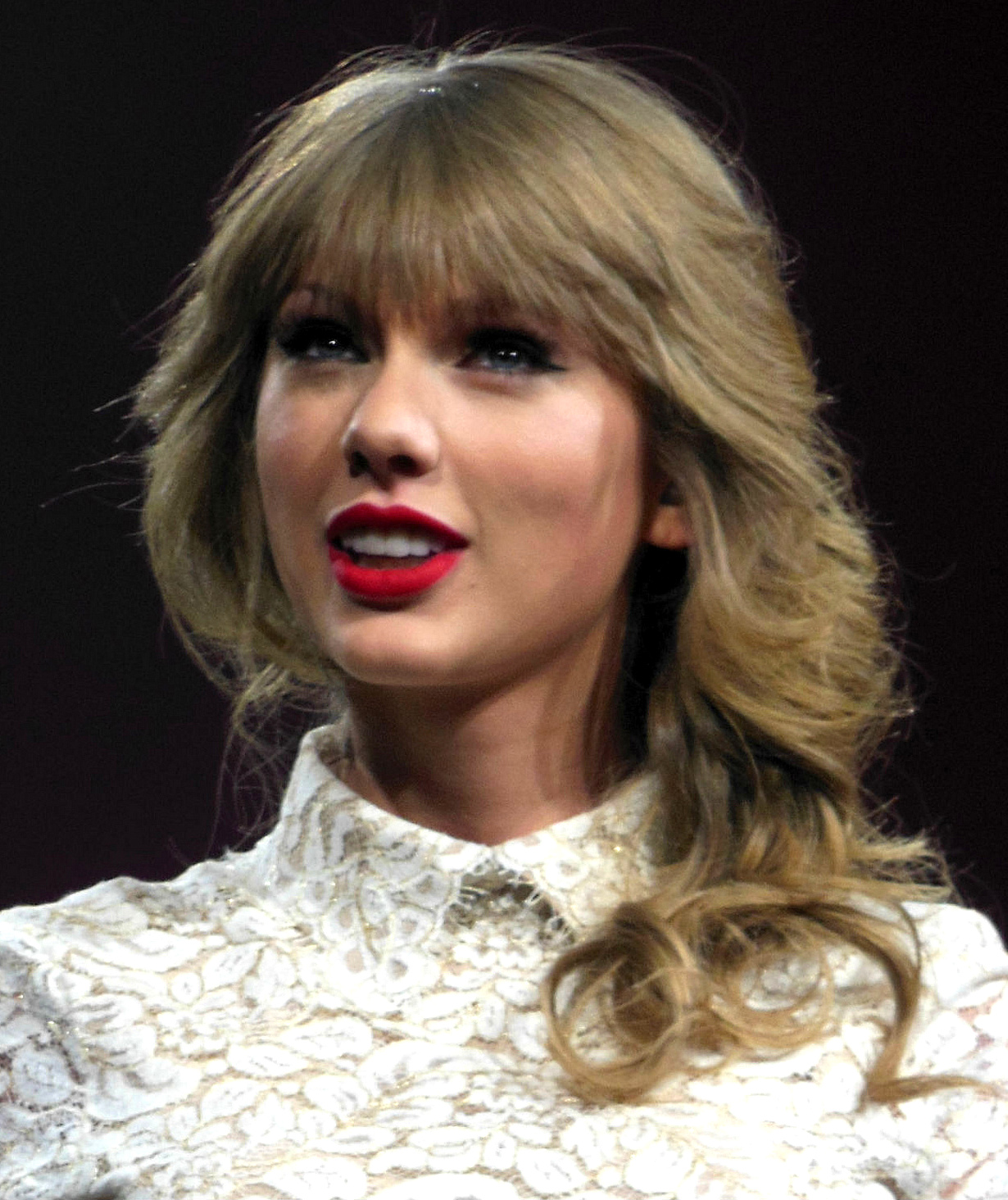
Taylor Swift was awarded the IFPI Global Recording Artist of the Year six times (2014, 2019, and from 2022 through 2025).

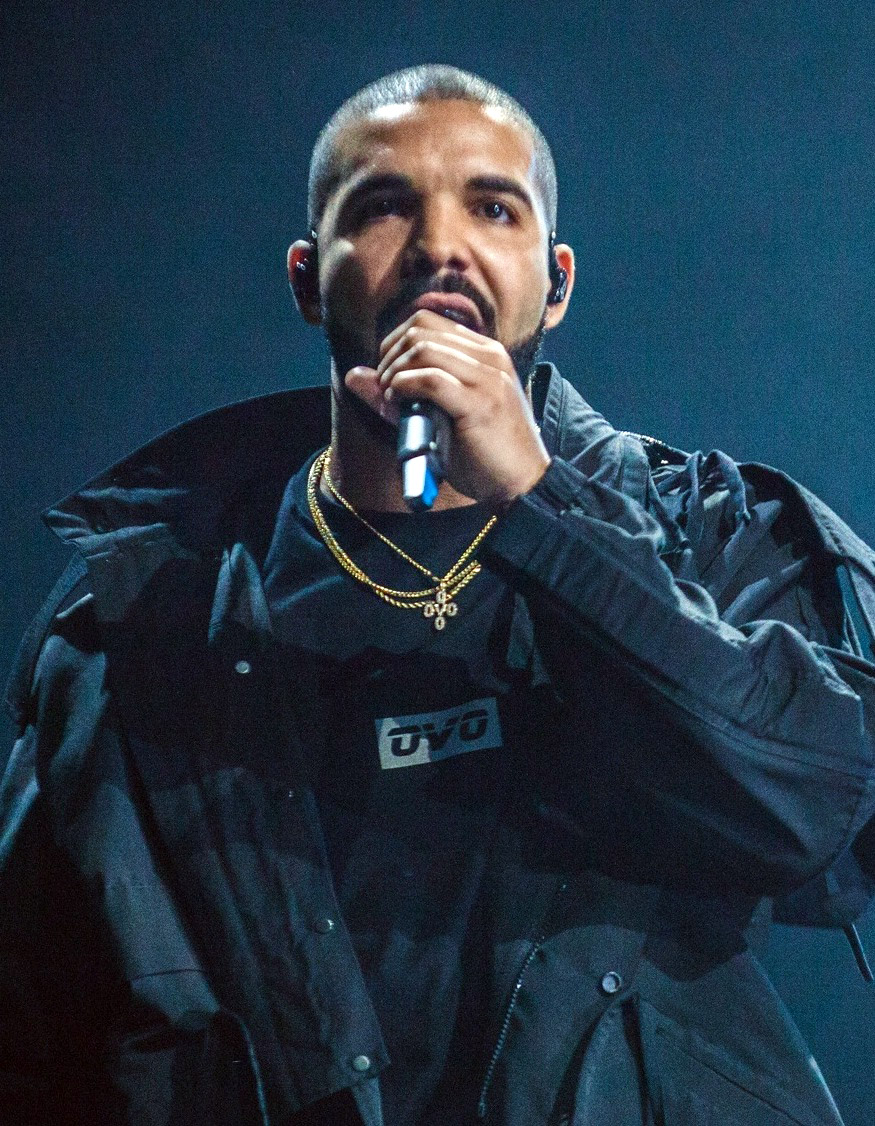
Drake was awarded the IFPI Global Recording Artist of the Year twice (2016 and 2018).

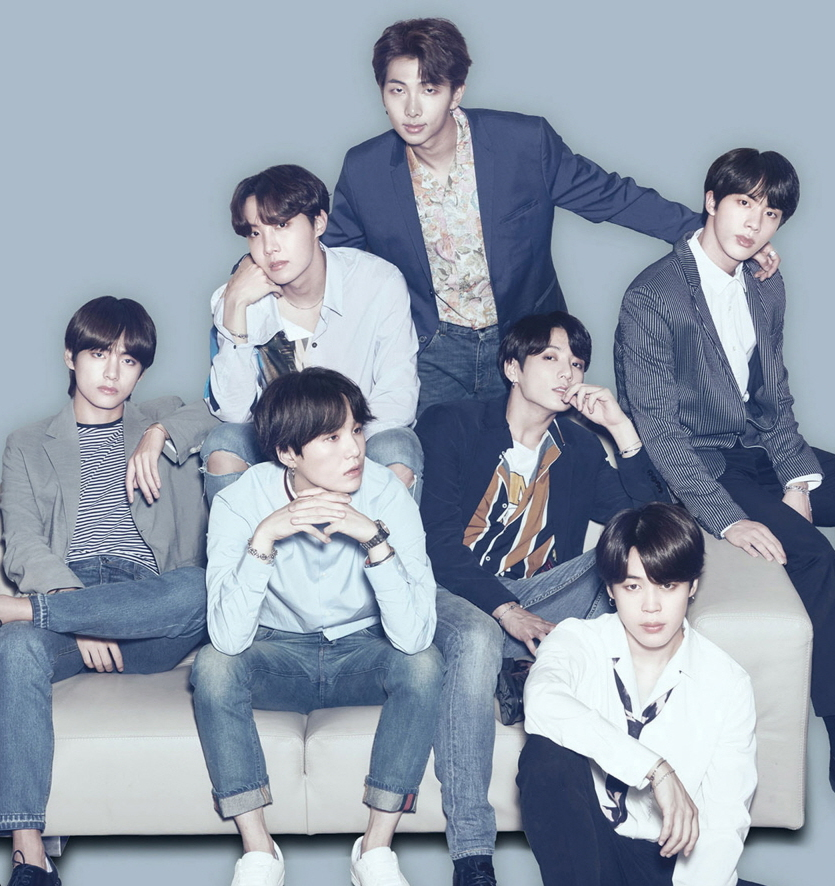
BTS was awarded the IFPI Global Recording Artist of the Year twice (2020 and 2021).

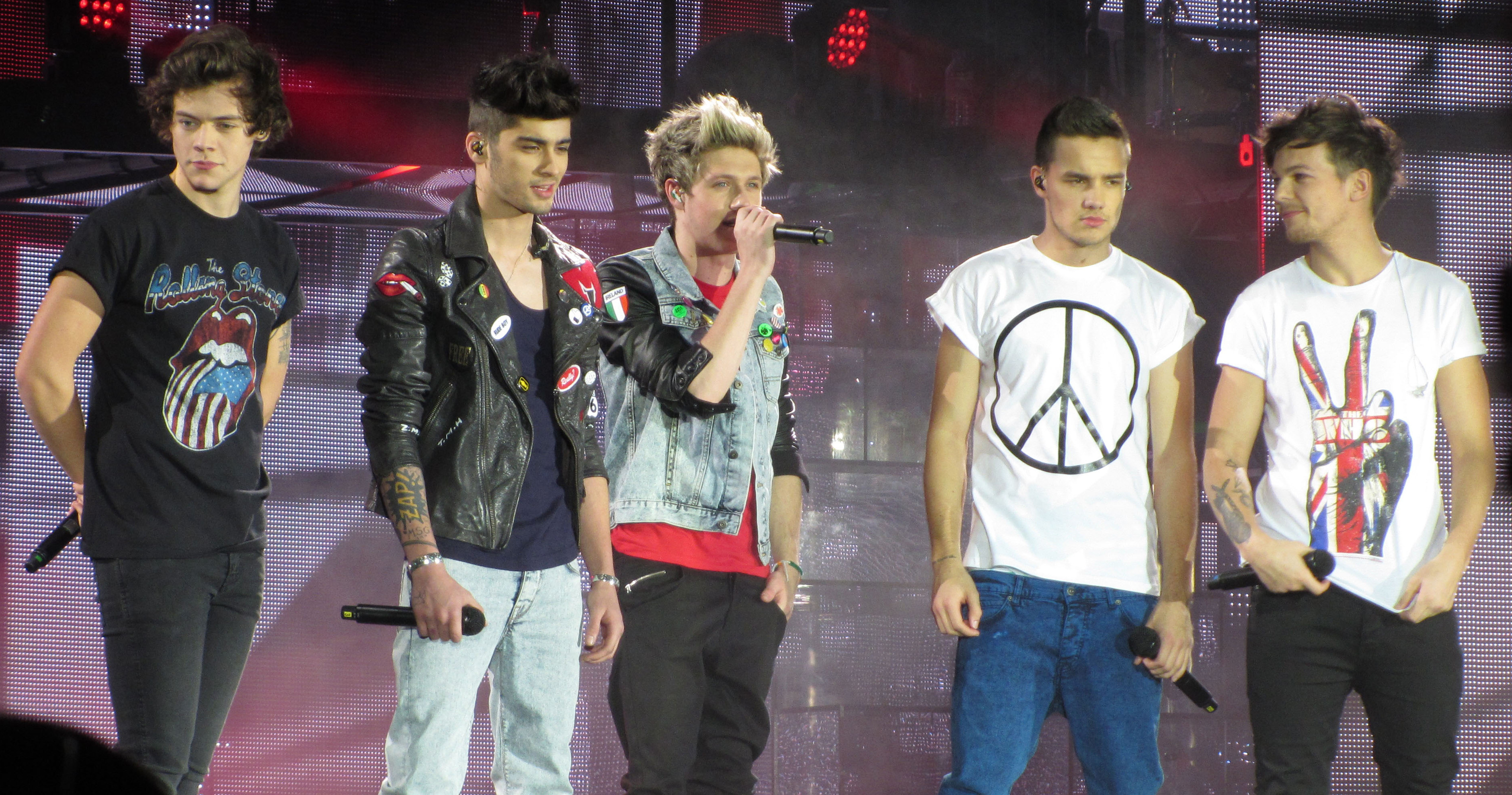
One Direction was awarded the IFPI Global Recording Artist of 2013.

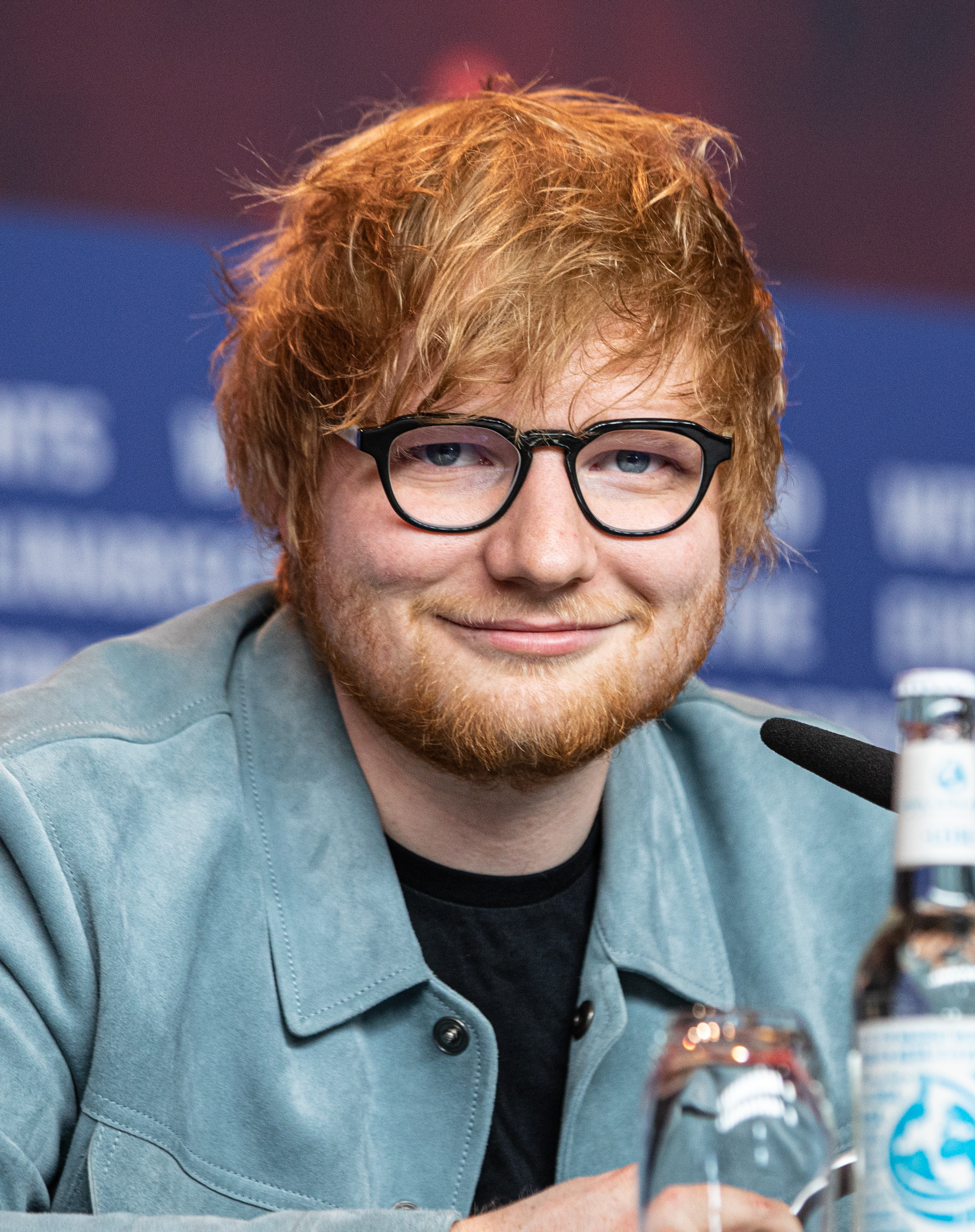
Ed Sheeran was awarded the IFPI Global Recording Artist of 2017.

=== 2013 ===
Rank	Artist	IFPI Top 10 Album of the Year	IFPI Top 10 Single of the Year
1	One Direction	Midnight Memories (first)	—N/a
2	Eminem	The Marshall Mathers LP2 (second)	—N/a
3	Justin Timberlake	The 20/20 Experience (third)	—N/a
4	Bruno Mars	Unorthodox Jukebox (fourth)	"When I Was Your Man" (eighth)
5	Katy Perry	Prism (sixth)	"Roar" (fifth)
6	Pink	—N/a	"Just Give Me a Reason" (fourth)
7	Macklemore & Ryan Lewis	—N/a	"Thrift Shop" (second)
8	Rihanna	—N/a	"Stay" (tenth)
9	Michael Bublé	To Be Loved (seventh)	—N/a
10	Daft Punk	Random Access Memories (fifth)	"Get Lucky" (sixth)

=== 2014 ===
Rank	Artist	IFPI Top 10 Album of the Year	IFPI Top 10 Single of the Year
1	Taylor Swift	1989 (second)	—N/a
2	One Direction	Four (sixth)	—N/a
3	Ed Sheeran	X (third)	—N/a
4	Coldplay	Ghost Stories (fourth)	—N/a
5	AC/DC	Rock or Bust (seventh)	—N/a
6	Michael Jackson	—N/a	—N/a
7	Pink Floyd	The Endless River (ninth)	—N/a
8	Sam Smith	In The Lonely Hour (fifth)	—N/a
9	Katy Perry	—N/a	"Dark Horse" (second)
10	Beyoncé	—N/a	—N/a

=== 2015 ===
Rank	Artist	IFPI Top 10 Album of the Year	IFPI Top 10 Single of the Year
1	Adele	25 (first)	"Hello" (seventh)
2	Ed Sheeran	X (second)	"Thinking Out Loud" (third)
3	Taylor Swift	1989 (third)	"Blank Space" (eighth)
4	Justin Bieber	Purpose (fourth)	—N/a
5	One Direction	Made in the A.M. (sixth)	—N/a
6	Coldplay	A Head Full Of Dreams (eighth)	—N/a
7	Maroon 5	—N/a	"Sugar" (fourth)
8	Sam Smith	In The Lonely Hour (fifth)	—N/a
9	Drake	—N/a	—N/a
10	The Weeknd	Beauty Behind The Madness (tenth)	—N/a

=== 2016 ===
Rank	Artist	IFPI Top 10 Album of the Year	IFPI Top 10 Single of the Year
1	Drake	Views (third)	"One Dance" (first)
2	David Bowie	Blackstar (fifth)	—N/a
3	Coldplay	A Head Full of Dreams (ninth)	—N/a
4	Adele	25 (second)	—N/a
5	Justin Bieber	—N/a	"Love Yourself" (second) "Sorry" (fifth)
6	Twenty One Pilots	Blurryface (eighth)	"Stressed Out" (tenth)
7	Beyoncé	Lemonade (first)	—N/a
8	Rihanna	—N/a	"Work" (sixth)
9	Prince	—N/a	—N/a
10	The Weeknd	—N/a	—N/a

=== 2017 ===
Rank	Artist	IFPI Top 10 Album of the Year	IFPI Top 10 Single of the Year
1	Ed Sheeran	÷ (first)	"Shape of You" (first) "Perfect" (ninth)
2	Drake	—N/a	—N/a
3	Taylor Swift	Reputation (second)	—N/a
4	Kendrick Lamar	Damn (seventh)	"Humble" (sixth)
5	Eminem	Revival (eighth)	—N/a
6	Bruno Mars	24K Magic (tenth)	"That's What I Like" (fourth)
7	The Weeknd	—N/a	—N/a
8	Imagine Dragons	—N/a	"Believer" (tenth)
9	Linkin Park	—N/a	—N/a
10	The Chainsmokers	—N/a	"Something Just like This" (third) "Closer" (fifth)

=== 2018 ===
Rank	Artist	IFPI Top 10 Album of the Year	IFPI Top 10 Single of the Year
1	Drake	—N/a	"God's Plan" (second)
2	BTS	Love Yourself: Answer (second); Love Yourself: Tear (third)	—N/a
3	Ed Sheeran	÷ (sixth)	"Shape of You" (third) "Perfect" (fourth)
4	Post Malone	—N/a	"Psycho" (tenth)
5	Eminem	Kamikaze (ninth)	—N/a
6	Queen	Bohemian Rhapsody (seventh)	—N/a
7	Imagine Dragons	—N/a	—N/a
8	Ariana Grande	—N/a	—N/a
9	Lady Gaga	A Star Is Born (fourth)	—N/a
10	Bruno Mars	—N/a	—N/a

=== 2019 ===
Rank	Artist	IFPI Top 10 Album of the Year	IFPI Top 10 Single of the Year
1	Taylor Swift	Lover (second)	—N/a
2	Ed Sheeran	No.6 Collaborations Project (seventh)	"I Don't Care" (seventh)
3	Post Malone	—N/a	"Sunflower" (fourth)
4	Billie Eilish	When We All Fall Asleep, Where Do We Go? (fifth)	"Bad Guy" (first)
5	Queen	Bohemian Rhapsody: The Original Soundtrack (sixth)	—N/a
6	Ariana Grande	Thank U, Next (eighth)	"7 Rings" (fifth)
7	BTS	Map of the Soul: Persona (third)	—N/a
8	Drake	—N/a	—N/a
9	Lady Gaga	A Star Is Born (fourth)	"Shallow" (eight)
10	The Beatles	Abbey Road (tenth)	—N/a

=== 2020 ===
IFPI's global albums chart was based on pure units sold until 2019. Since 2020, the albums have been reported using album-equivalent units (all-format chart). For singles, until 2019, IFPI listed the figures based on a combination of pure track downloads and streaming numbers converted into track-equivalent units. Since 2020, the method has been reversed, with downloads being converted into stream-equivalent figure.

Rank	Artist	IFPI Top 10 Album of the Year	IFPI Top 10 Single of the Year
1	BTS	Map of the Soul: 7 (first); Be (fourth)	"Dynamite" (tenth)
2	Taylor Swift	Folklore (ninth)	—N/a
3	Drake	—N/a	"Life Is Good" (sixth)
4	The Weeknd	After Hours (second)	"Blinding Lights" (first)
5	Billie Eilish	When We All Fall Asleep, Where Do We Go? (third)	"Bad Guy" (ninth)
6	Eminem	—N/a	—N/a
7	Post Malone	Hollywood's Bleeding (sixth)	—N/a
8	Ariana Grande	—N/a	—N/a
9	Juice Wrld	—N/a	—N/a
10	Justin Bieber	Changes (eighth)	—N/a

=== 2021 ===
Rank	Artist	IFPI Top 10 Album of the Year	IFPI Top 10 Single of the Year
1	BTS	—N/a	"Butter" (fourth)
2	Taylor Swift	—N/a	—N/a
3	Adele	30 (first)	—N/a
4	Drake	—N/a	—N/a
5	Ed Sheeran	= (fourth)	"Bad Habits" (tenth)
6	The Weeknd	After Hours (fifth)	"Save Your Tears" (first) "Blinding Lights" (seventh)
7	Billie Eilish	—N/a	—N/a
8	Justin Bieber	Justice (third)	"Stay" (second) "Peaches" (sixth)
9	Seventeen	—N/a	—N/a
10	Olivia Rodrigo	Sour (second)	"Drivers License" (fifth) "Good 4 U" (eighth)

=== 2022 ===
Rank	Artist	IFPI Top 10 Album of the Year	IFPI Top 10 Single of the Year
1	Taylor Swift	Midnights (second)	—N/a
2	BTS	Proof (fourth)	—N/a
3	Drake	—N/a	—N/a
4	Bad Bunny	Un Verano Sin Ti (first)	"Me Porto Bonito" (ninth)
5	The Weeknd	—N/a	"Save Your Tears" (fifth)
6	Seventeen	Face the Sun (seventh)	—N/a
7	Stray Kids	Maxident (sixth)	—N/a
8	Harry Styles	Harry's House (third)	"As It Was" (first)
9	Jay Chou	—N/a	—N/a
10	Ed Sheeran	= (tenth)	"Shivers" (seventh) "Bad Habits" (tenth)

=== 2023 ===
Rank	Artist	IFPI Top 10 Album of the Year	IFPI Top 10 Single of the Year
1	Taylor Swift	Midnights (fourth); 1989 (Taylor's Version) (fifth)	"Cruel Summer" (seventh) "Anti-Hero" (ninth)
2	Seventeen	FML (first); Seventeenth Heaven (eighth)	—N/a
3	Stray Kids	5-Star (second); Rock-Star (ninth)	—N/a
4	Drake	—N/a	—N/a
5	The Weeknd	—N/a	"Die For You" (fourth)
6	Morgan Wallen	One Thing at a Time (third)	"Last Night" (eighth)
7	Tomorrow X Together	—N/a	—N/a
8	NewJeans	—N/a	—N/a
9	Bad Bunny	—N/a	—N/a
10	Lana Del Rey	—N/a	—N/a

=== 2024 ===
Rank	Artist	IFPI Top 10 Album of the Year	IFPI Top 10 Single of the Year
1	Taylor Swift	The Tortured Poets Department (first)	"Cruel Summer" (ninth)
2	Drake	—N/a	—N/a
3	Seventeen	Spill the Feels (sixth); 17 Is Right Here (eighth)	—N/a
4	Billie Eilish	Hit Me Hard and Soft (second)	"Birds of a Feather" (fourth)
5	Stray Kids	Ate (tenth)	—N/a
6	Zach Bryan	—N/a	—N/a
7	The Weeknd	—N/a	—N/a
8	Eminem	—N/a	—N/a
9	Kendrick Lamar	—N/a	"Not Like Us" (eighth)
10	Sabrina Carpenter	Short n' Sweet (third)	"Espresso" (second)

=== 2025 ===
Rank	Artist	IFPI Top 10 Album of the Year	IFPI Top 10 Single of the Year
1	Taylor Swift	The Life of a Showgirl (first)	—N/a
2	Stray Kids	Karma (sixth)	—N/a
3	Drake	—N/a	—N/a
4	The Weeknd	—N/a	—N/a
5	Bad Bunny	Debí Tirar Más Fotos (fourth)	—N/a
6	Kendrick Lamar	—N/a	"Luther" (eighth) "Not Like Us" (tenth)
7	Morgan Wallen	I'm the Problem (second)	—N/a
8	Sabrina Carpenter	Short n' Sweet (fifth)	—N/a
9	Billie Eilish	Hit Me Hard And Soft (eighth)	"Birds of a Feather" (sixth)
10	Lady Gaga	Mayhem (ninth)	"Die with a Smile" (fourth)

== Statistics ==
Most award wins
Wins	Artist	Year(s)
6	Taylor Swift	2014; 2019; 2022; 2023; 2024; 2025
2	Drake	2016; 2018
2	BTS	2020; 2021

Most top 3 appearances
Top 3 appearances	Artist	Wins
10	Taylor Swift	6
7	Drake	2
5	Ed Sheeran	1
4	BTS	2
2	Adele	1
2	Seventeen	0
2	Stray Kids	0

Most top 5 appearances
Top 5 appearances	Artist	Wins
10	Taylor Swift	6
9	Drake	2
6	Ed Sheeran	1
4	The Weeknd	0
3	BTS	2
3	Adele	1
3	Stray Kids	0
3	Billie Eilish	0

Most top 10 appearances
Top 10 appearances	Artist	Wins
11	Drake	2
10	Taylor Swift	6
9	The Weeknd	0
7	Ed Sheeran	1
5	Billie Eilish	0
5	BTS	2
5	Eminem	0

== See also ==
- Billboard Year-End Top Artist
- List of best-selling albums
- List of best-selling music artists
- List of best-selling singles
