= Jazzyfact =

South Korean hiphop duo

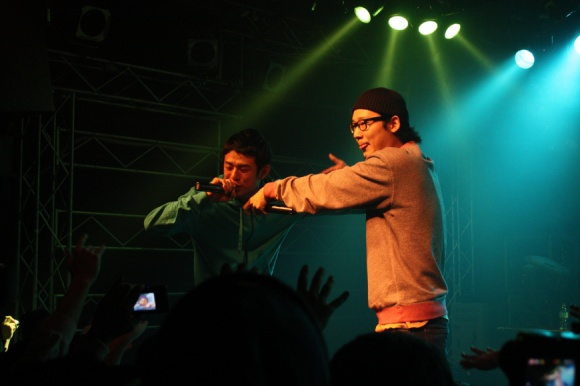
- Jazzyfact in 2011

Background information
- Origin: South Korea
- Genres: hip hop; jazz rap
- Years active: 2008–present
- Members: Beenzino; Shimmy Twice

Jazzyfact (Korean: 재지팩트) is a South Korean hip hop duo. The group currently consists of rapper Beenzino and producer Shimmy Twice. They released their first studio album Lifes Like in 2010, and in 2017 they released an EP Waves Like.

== Career ==
Jazzyfact was formed in 2008. Beenzino and Shimmy Twice were high school students at the time, and they had their own teams, but they decided to team up together because their team members all quit music.

They released their single Addicted 2 in 2009 and their studio album Lifes Like in 2010. Hyen Minhyeong of IZM reviewed "Beenzino's dream, expressed through Shimmy Twice, seems immature because it is not bound by realistic conditions, but it is impressive to insist on the faded purity due to capitalism." They released their single Always Awake and Big in 2011, but later the band went on hiatus due to the career of Beenzino's Illionaire Records and Shimmy Twice's enlistment in the military. Before Beenzino joined the military in 2017, they released an EP Waves Like.

== Discography ==
=== Albums ===
- Lifes Like (2010)

=== Extended plays ===
- Waves Like (2017)
