= Cautious Clay =

American singer and songwriter

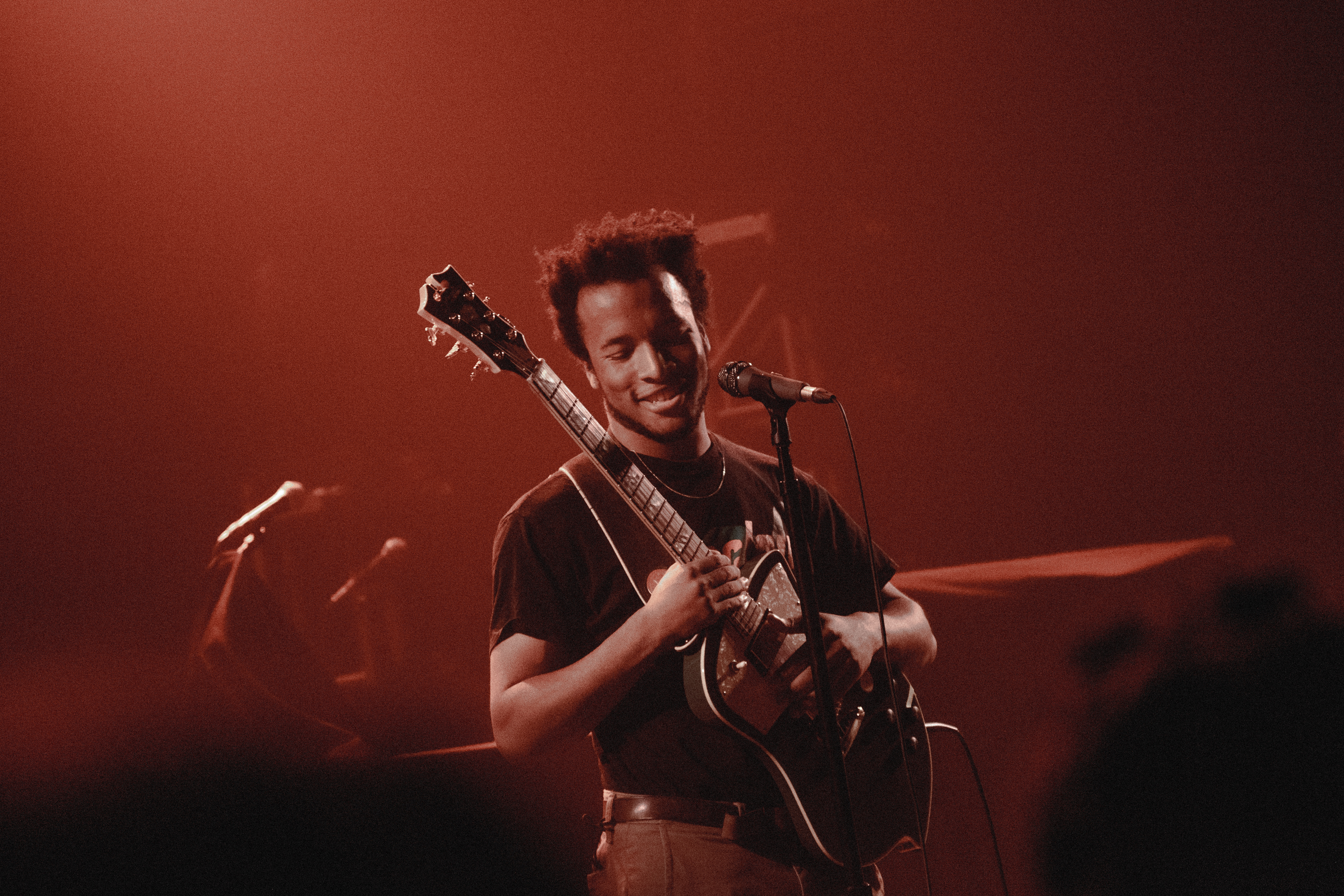

Background information
- Born: Joshua Karpeh; January 30, 1993 (age 33); Cleveland, Ohio, U.S.
- Genres: R&B; indie pop
- Occupations: Singer; songwriter; record producer
- Instruments: Vocals; saxophone; flute; guitar; bass; keyboard; drums
- Years active: 2015 – present
- Labels: Independent, Blue Note
- Website: cautiousclay.com

Joshua Karpeh (born January 30, 1993), known professionally as Cautious Clay, is an American singer, songwriter, and record producer.

== Early life and education ==
Karpeh was born on January 30, 1993, in Cleveland, Ohio and attended Benedictine High School. He graduated with a degree in International Affairs from the George Washington University in 2015. His maternal grandfather is an obstetrician who performed as a percussionist while studying as an undergraduate exchange student at Lincoln University in Chester, PA in the 1950s. He is of Kru ethnicity from Liberia. Karpeh worked as a real estate agent in New York City for two years and in advertising for a year before pursuing music full-time.

== Career ==
Karpeh learned music production at George Washington University by remixing beats for friends. His music style is influenced by hip-hop, organic and electronic sounds. He plays multiple instruments including the saxophone, flute, guitar, bass, keyboard and drums.

Known by his stage name Cautious Clay, Karpeh, on September 22, 2017 released "Cold War", the first single from his debut EP Blood Type, which was first released on February 21, 2018, and then re-released on April 13, 2018 with the additional single "Stolen Moments".

Karpeh's second EP Resonance, was first released on May 30, 2018 and then re-released on August 22, 2018 with the additional song "Crowned". His third EP Table of Context, was released on March 27, 2019.

Karpeh played at the 2019 Billy Reid Shindig in Florence, Alabama. He also featured on the soundtrack of 13 Reasons Why: Season 3 with the song "Swim Home". Swim Home is one of two collaborations with John Mayer, the other is "Carry Me Away", featured on Table of Context.

"Cold War" was interpolated on the song "London Boy" for Taylor Swift's seventh studio album Lover (2019).

Karpeh's single, "Erase", was featured on the soundtrack of FIFA 20.

Karpeh released his first studio album, Deadpan Love, on June 25, 2021, which included previously released singles "Agreeable," "Roots," and "Dying in the Subtlety," and was accompanied by a music video for song the "Karma & Friends". A deluxe version followed on February 11, 2022, featuring four new songs and an additional four tracks of existing songs now featuring strings. In support of the album he embarked on his Karma & Friends tour across North America and Europe.

On November 11, 2022, Karpeh released his fourth EP Thin Ice on the Cake, a collection of three singles previously released throughout 2022 with three new songs.

Karpeh released his second studio album, Karpeh, on August 18, 2023.

== Discography ==
=== Studio albums ===
- Deadpan Love (2021)
- Karpeh (2023)
- The Hours: Morning (2025)

=== Extended plays ===
- Blood Type (2017 and 2018)
- Resonance (2018)
- Table of Context (2019)
- Thin Ice on the Cake (2022)

=== Singles ===
- "Cold War"
- "Joshua Tree"
- "Stolen Moments"
- "French Riviera"
- "Crowned"
- "Reasons"
- "Sidewinder"
- "Swim Home"
- "Erase"
- "Cheesin" (with Cautious Clay, Remi Wolf, Still Woozy, Sophie Meiers, Claud, Melanie Faye & HXNS)"
- "Agreeable"
- "Dying in the Subtlety"
- "Roots"
- "Karma & Friends"
- "25/8"
- "Ohio"
- "Another Half" (featuring Julian Lage)

=== Songwriting credits ===
Title	Year	Artist(s)	Album	Credits	Written with
"Floating" (featuring Khalid)	2018	Alina Baraz	The Color of You	Co-writer/Producer	Alina Baraz, Khalid
"Devil in Paradise"	2018	Cruel Youth	—N/a	Co-writer	Teddy Sinclair, Willy Moon, Michael Tighe, Stelios Phili, Jacob H. LiBassi
"Hey Nice to Know Ya"	2018	LP	Heart to Mouth	Co-writer/Producer	LP, Patrick Morrissey
"Matches"	2019	Quinn XCII	From Michigan with Love	Co-writer/Producer	Quinn XCII
"London Boy"	2019	Taylor Swift	Lover	Co-writer	Taylor Swift, Jack Antonoff, Sounwave
"Sober"	2019	Sebastian	Thirst	Co-writer	Sebastian, Bakar
"Actions"	2020	John Legend	Bigger Love	Co-writer	John Legend, David Axelrod, Sebastian Kole, Oak Felder, Keith "Ten4" Sorrells, Alexander Niceforo
"One Life"	2020	John Legend	Bigger Love	Co-writer	John Legend, Anderson Paak, Jeff Gitelman
"Bigger Love"	2020	John Legend	Bigger Love	Co-writer/Producer	John Legend, Toby Gad, Ryan Tedder, Zach Skelton
"Pluto"	2023	Melanie Martinez	PORTALS	Co-producer	
