= London Boy (song) =

2019 song by Taylor Swift

Song by Taylor Swift

from the album Lover
- Released: August 23, 2019
- Studio: Conway Recording (Los Angeles); Electric Lady (New York City); Metropolis (London)
- Genre: Bubblegum pop; reggae-pop
- Length: 3:10
- Label: Republic
- Songwriters: Taylor Swift; Jack Antonoff; Cautious Clay; Mark Anthony Spears
- Producers: Taylor Swift; Jack Antonoff

Audio video
- "London Boy" on YouTube

"London Boy" is a song by the American singer-songwriter Taylor Swift from her seventh studio album, Lover (2019). Swift, Jack Antonoff, and Sounwave (Mark Anthony Spears) wrote the song; the first two are credited as producers while Sounwave is credited as co-producer. A bubblegum pop and reggae-pop song, "London Boy" includes a spoken-word intro by the English actor Idris Elba and an interpolation of the song "Cold War" by the American singer Cautious Clay, who was given a co-writing credit on the track. Inspired by Swift's experiences in London, the lyrics mention various London locations and express a Tennessean woman's infatuation with a male love interest from the city.

"London Boy" charted in Australia, Canada, Singapore, and the United States, and it received certifications in Australia, Brazil, New Zealand, and the United Kingdom. Music critics gave "London Boy" mixed reviews: those complimentary found the production upbeat and catchy, but those critical deemed the lyrics unsophisticated. The British press generally panned the song and thought that the lyrics were a poor representation of London. During promotion of Lover in 2019, Swift performed "London Boy" live on BBC Radio 1's Live Lounge and at Capital FM's Jingle Bell Ball. She sang the track on August 16, 2024, at the Eras Tour concert in London.

== Background and release ==
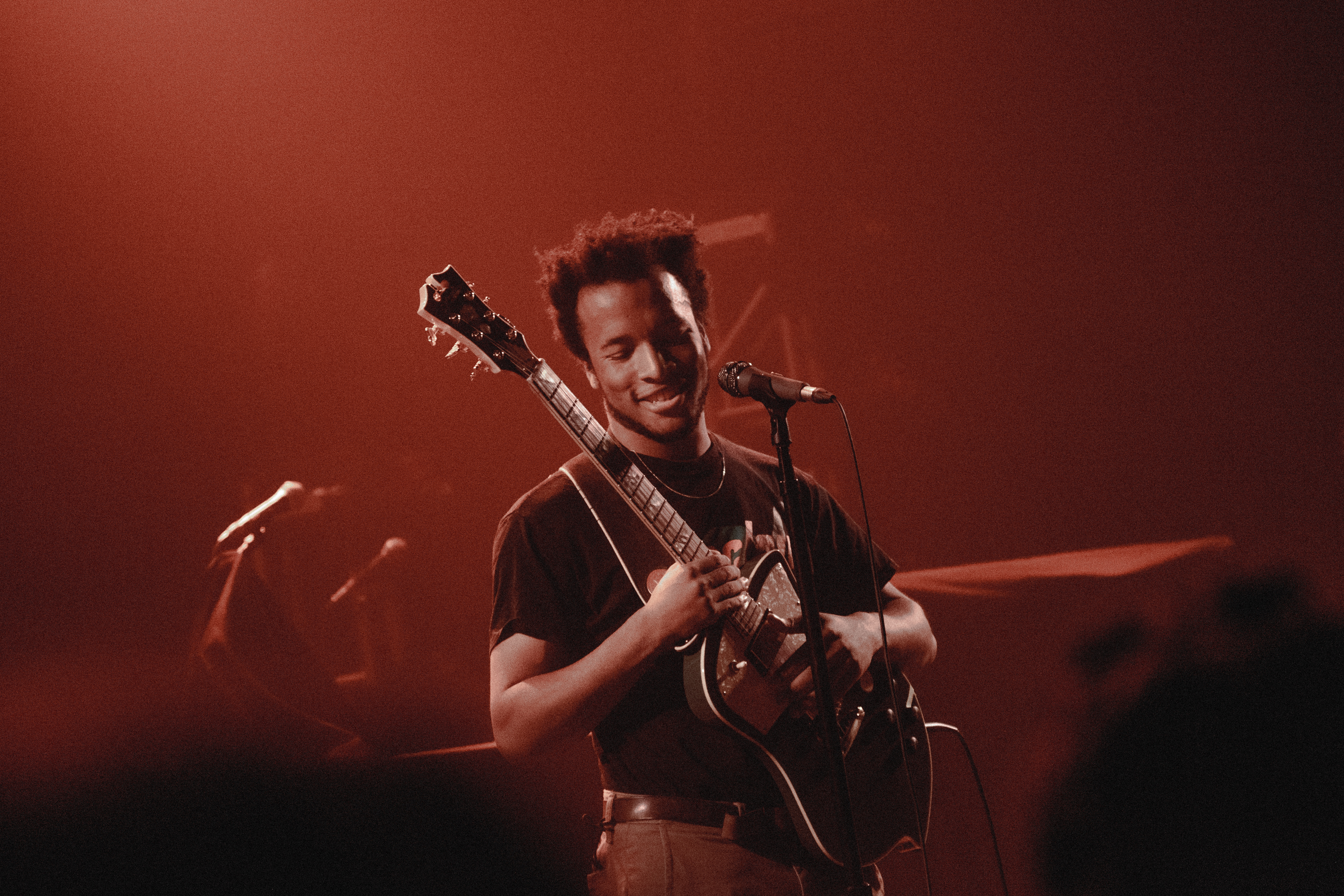
"London Boy" contains an interpolation of "Cold War" by Cautious Clay (pictured).

Taylor Swift released Lover on August 23, 2019, through Republic Records. Described by Swift as a "love letter to love" itself, Lover explores the many feelings evoked by love, inspired by the connection she felt to her fans during her Reputation Stadium Tour (2018). The track list of the album consists of 18 songs. "London Boy" was written and produced by Swift, Jack Antonoff, and Sounwave, with additional writing credit for R&B musician Cautious Clay, a result of an interpolation of Clay's 2018 song "Cold War". The song was recorded at Electric Lady Studios in New York.

Cautious Clay was contacted by Swift's team in June 2019, prior to Lover's release, when he was on tour in Bergen, Norway. Swift wanted to interpolate "Cold War" into "London Boy", which he happily accepted. "Cold War" was written and produced entirely by Cautious Clay in June 2017, after he had attended the annual Coney Island Mermaid Parade in Brooklyn. He told Rolling Stone: "[...] I don't know anything about her, really, so, to me, that she would feel it was appropriate to include that interpolation is just pretty surreal."

Swift performed "London Boy" for the first time during BBC Radio 1's Live Lounge on September 2, 2019. She later included the song on the set list of her performance at Capital FM's Jingle Bell Ball in London on December 8, 2019. The song was also performed at Wembley Stadium in London during the surprise song set of The Eras Tour on August 16, 2024.

== Music and lyrics ==
"London Boy" is a bubblegum pop and reggae-pop song with strong influences of reggae. The bridge features elements of dancehall. Set over a tempo of 158 beats per minute, the track's minimal and upbeat production incorporates layers of synthesizers, eighth-note keyboard tones, recurring beats, and horns. Lyrically, Swift was inspired to write "London Boy" by her appreciation of the city of London. She said: "I just kind of wrote about, basically, what it was like to basically be like, 'Bye guys! I'm gonna go here for a long time.' " The lyrics are told from a Tennessean woman's perspective and detail her infatuation for a "London boy". They name-check various locations and cultural icons typically associated with her American culture and the love interest's English culture.

"London Boy" begins with a spoken-word intro by the English actor Idris Elba, taken from his appearance on The Late Late Show with James Corden in 2017. Throughout the song, Swift mentions Motown Records, Southern California, Bruce Springsteen, Tennessee whiskey, and "American smile" as examples of her own culture, and name-checks the London locations Shoreditch, Camden Market, Soho, Hackney, Brixton, Bond Street, and the West End. The love interest is a resident of Highgate, a neighborhood associated with old money and wealth. Swift expresses enjoyment of several cultural activities in London, including having an evening high tea, hearing "stories from uni", and watching rugby at a pub. At one point, Swift declares that she is "a Tennessee Stella McCartney", referencing the fashion designer with whom Swift launched a Lover-inspired sustainable clothing line. Rob Sheffield described the song as a "Britpop tribute".

== Critical reception ==
"London Boy" received mixed reviews. Roisin O'Connor of The Independent called it one of the most divisive tracks of Lover, adding that "a lot of Brits are taking issue with the lyrics, as they're essentially a tourist's guide to where-not-to-visit in London". Many critics deemed it one of Lover's weakest songs, including Jon Caramanica of The New York Times, Dave Holmes of Esquire, and Erin Vanderhoof of Vanity Fair. Mikael Wood of the Los Angeles Times deemed "London Boy" the second-worst track on Lover behind the lead single "Me!" and criticized the lyrics for "hauling out every jolly old cliché [Swift] can think of". In a review for Slate, Carl Wilson thought that the London references are annoying and ineffective. Shon Faye from Dazed similarly expressed distaste towards the lyrics, but noted that it was justifiable for Swift, an American, to have a "wide-eyed naivety" embraced by first-timers in London. Sarah Carson from the i lauded the catchy production of "London Boy", but dismissed the lyrics as one of the album's "concessions to silliness and gimmicks".

On the positive side, Keira Leonard of The Music complimented the track's lighthearted and rather silly nature, writing that the lyrics were "so pure" that "you wanna boop your partners nose with or put on when you're feeling down". Nick Levine from NME agreed, and opined that the song is not to be taken seriously for its "clumsy fun" sentiments. In The Irish Times, Louis Bruton selected "London Boy" as one of the album's most cheerful songs. Nick Levine of NME picked the track as one of Lover's most "infectious" and felt that the lyrics portrayed "clumsy fun". O'Connor ranked the song 37th on her list of Swift's select 100 tracks because she thought it showcased Swift's self-awareness "of her outsider status".

== Credits and personnel ==
Credits are adapted from the liner notes of Lover.

- Taylor Swift – vocals, songwriter, producer
- Jack Antonoff – producer, songwriter, programming, recording, percussion, bass, keyboard
- Sounwave – co-producer, songwriter
- Cautious Clay – songwriter, interpolation
- Laura Sisk – recording
- John Rooney – assistant recording
- Jon Sher – assistant recording
- Nick Mills – assistant recording
- John Hanes – engineer
- Mikey Freedom Hart – keyboard
- Evan Smith – keyboard, saxophone
- Sean Hutchinson – drums
- Serban Ghenea – mixing
- Randy Merrill – mastering
- Idris Elba – guest intro
- James Corden – guest intro

== Charts ==
Upon the release of Lover, "London Boy" entered the official singles charts in Australia (ARIA Singles Chart—peaking at number 42), Canada (Canadian Hot 100—peaking at number 54), and the U.S. (Billboard Hot 100—at number 62). It also entered and peaked at number 47 on the UK Streaming Chart, a component of the UK Singles Chart.

Weekly chart positions for "London Boy"
Chart (2019)	Peak position
Australia (ARIA)	42
Canada Hot 100 (Billboard)	54
Singapore (RIAS)	30
UK Audio Streaming (Official Charts)	47
US Billboard Hot 100	62

== Certifications ==
Certifications for "London Boy"
Region	Certification	Certified units/sales
Australia (ARIA)	Platinum	70,000^{‡}
Brazil (Pro-Música Brasil)	Platinum	40,000^{‡}
New Zealand (RMNZ)	Gold	15,000^{‡}
United Kingdom (BPI)	Gold	400,000^{‡}
^{‡} Sales+streaming figures based on certification alone.
