= List of number-one urban albums of 2020 (Australia) =

ARIA Charts number-one urban albums of 2020 < 2019 2021 >

Other Australian number-one charts of 2020
- albums
- singles
- urban singles
- dance singles
- club tracks
- digital tracks
- streaming tracks

Top Australian singles and albums of 2020
- Triple J Hottest 100
- top 25 singles
- top 25 albums

This is a list of albums that reached number-one on the ARIA Urban Albums Chart in 2020. The ARIA Urban Albums Chart is a weekly chart that ranks the best-performing urban albums in Australia. It is published by the Australian Recording Industry Association (ARIA), an organisation that collects music data for the weekly ARIA Charts. To be eligible to appear on the chart, the recording must be an album of a predominantly urban nature.

== Chart history ==
Issue date	Album	Artist(s)	Reference
6 January	JackBoys	JackBoys and Travis Scott	
13 January	Hollywood's Bleeding	Post Malone	
20 January	Hollywood's Bleeding	Post Malone	
27 January	Music To Be Murdered By	Eminem	
3 February	Music To Be Murdered By	Eminem	
10 February	The Octagon	Chillinit	
17 February	Music To Be Murdered By	Eminem	
24 February	Music To Be Murdered By	Eminem	
2 March	Music To Be Murdered By	Eminem	
9 March	Music To Be Murdered By	Eminem	
16 March	Eternal Atake	Lil Uzi Vert	
23 March	Eternal Atake	Lil Uzi Vert	
30 March	Hollywood's Bleeding	Post Malone	
6 April	ADHD	Joyner Lucas	
13 April	Roll the Dice	Kerser	
20 April	Hollywood's Bleeding	Post Malone	
27 April	Blame It on Baby	DaBaby	
4 May	Hollywood's Bleeding	Post Malone	
11 May	Dark Lane Demo Tapes	Drake	
18 May	Dark Lane Demo Tapes	Drake	
25 May	Dark Lane Demo Tapes	Drake	
1 June	D-2	Agust D	
8 June	Hollywood's Bleeding	Post Malone	
15 June	Hollywood's Bleeding	Post Malone	
22 June	Hollywood's Bleeding	Post Malone	
29 June	Hollywood's Bleeding	Post Malone	
6 July	Hollywood's Bleeding	Post Malone	
13 July	Shoot for the Stars, Aim for the Moon	Pop Smoke	
20 July	Legends Never Die	Juice Wrld	
27 July	Legends Never Die	Juice Wrld	
3 August	F*ck Love	The Kid Laroi	
10 August	Legends Never Die	Juice Wrld	
17 August	Legends Never Die	Juice Wrld	
24 August	Legends Never Die	Juice Wrld	
31 August	Legends Never Die	Juice Wrld	
7 September	Legends Never Die	Juice Wrld	
14 September	Legends Never Die	Juice Wrld	
21 September	Shoot for the Stars, Aim for the Moon	Pop Smoke	
28 September	Shoot for the Stars, Aim for the Moon	Pop Smoke	
5 October	Nectar	Joji	
12 October	Savage Mode II	21 Savage and Metro Boomin	
19 October	Full Circle	Chillinit	
26 October	Shoot for the Stars, Aim for the Moon	Pop Smoke	
2 November	Shoot for the Stars, Aim for the Moon	Pop Smoke	
9 November	Panic Force	Triple One	
16 November	F*ck Love	The Kid Laroi	
23 November	F*ck Love	The Kid Laroi	
30 November	F*ck Love	The Kid Laroi	
7 December	F*ck Love	The Kid Laroi	
14 December	F*ck Love	The Kid Laroi	
21 December	F*ck Love	The Kid Laroi	
28 December	Music To Be Murdered By	Eminem	

== See also ==
- 2020 in music
- List of number-one albums of 2020 (Australia)
