= List of number-one digital albums of 2020 (Australia) =

ARIA Charts number-one digital albums of 2020 < 2019 2021 >

Other Australian number-one charts of 2020
- albums
- singles
- urban singles
- dance singles
- club tracks
- digital tracks
- streaming tracks

Top Australian singles and albums of 2020
- Triple J Hottest 100
- top 25 singles
- top 25 albums

The ARIA Digital Album Chart ranks the best-performing albums and extended plays (EPs) in Australia. Its data, published by the Australian Recording Industry Association, is based collectively on the weekly digital sales of albums and EPs.

== Chart history ==
Date	Album	Artist(s)	Ref.
6 January	Frozen II	Soundtrack	
13 January	Frozen II	Soundtrack	
20 January	Live in Adelaide '19	King Gizzard & the Lizard Wizard	
27 January	Music to Be Murdered By	Eminem	
3 February	Music to Be Murdered By	Eminem	
10 February	The Octagon	Chillinit	
17 February	Father Of All..	Green Day	
28 September	The Speed of Now Part 1	Keith Urban	
5 October	Nectar	Joji	

== Number-one artists ==
Position	Artist	Weeks at No. 1
1	Eminem	2
2	King Gizzard & the Lizard Wizard	1
2	Chillinit	1
2	Green Day	1
2	Keith Urban	1
2	Joji	1

== See also ==
- 2020 in music
- ARIA Charts
- List of number-one albums of 2020 (Australia)
