= List of number-one country albums of 2020 (Australia) =

ARIA Charts number-one country albums of 2020 < 2019 2021 >

Other Australian number-one charts of 2020
- albums
- singles
- urban singles
- dance singles
- club tracks
- digital tracks
- streaming tracks

Top Australian singles and albums of 2020
- Triple J Hottest 100
- top 25 singles
- top 25 albums

These are the Australian Country number-one albums of 2020, per the ARIA Charts.

Issue date	Album	Artist
6 January	What You See Is What You Get	Luke Combs
13 January	What You See Is What You Get	Luke Combs
20 January	What You See Is What You Get	Luke Combs
27 January	What You See Is What You Get	Luke Combs
3 February	What You See Is What You Get	Luke Combs
10 February	What You See Is What You Get	Luke Combs
17 February	What You See Is What You Get	Luke Combs
24 February	What You See Is What You Get	Luke Combs
2 March	What You See Is What You Get	Luke Combs
9 March	What You See Is What You Get	Luke Combs
16 March	What You See Is What You Get	Luke Combs
23 March	Speed of Life	Adam Brand
30 March	All the Hits & All New Love Songs	Kenny Rogers
6 April	What You See Is What You Get	Luke Combs
13 April	What You See Is What You Get	Luke Combs
20 April	What You See Is What You Get	Luke Combs
27 April	What You See Is What You Get	Luke Combs
4 May	What You See Is What You Get	Luke Combs
11 May	What You See Is What You Get	Luke Combs
18 May	What You See Is What You Get	Luke Combs
25 May	What You See Is What You Get	Luke Combs
1 June	What You See Is What You Get	Luke Combs
8 June	Wild World	Kip Moore
15 June	What You See Is What You Get	Luke Combs
22 June	Mayhem to Madness	The McClymonts
29 June	What You See Is What You Get	Luke Combs
6 July	What You See Is What You Get	Luke Combs
13 July	What You See Is What You Get	Luke Combs
20 July	What You See Is What You Get	Luke Combs
27 July	Gaslighter	The Chicks
3 August	Gaslighter	The Chicks
10 August	Wreck Me	Travis Collins
17 August	Born Here Live Here Die Here	Luke Bryan
24 August	Blonde On The Tracks	Emma Swift
31 August	Here on Earth	Tim McGraw
7 September	What You See Is What You Get	Luke Combs
14 September	Slim and I	Slim Dusty
21 September	What You See Is What You Get	Luke Combs
28 September	The Speed of Now Part 1	Keith Urban
5 October	The Speed of Now Part 1	Keith Urban
12 October	The Speed of Now Part 1	Keith Urban
19 October	The Speed of Now Part 1	Keith Urban
26 October	The Speed of Now Part 1	Keith Urban
2 November	What You See Ain't Always What You Get	Luke Combs
9 November	What You See Ain't Always What You Get	Luke Combs
16 November	What You See Ain't Always What You Get	Luke Combs
23 November	What You See Ain't Always What You Get	Luke Combs
30 November	Johnny Cash and the Royal Philharmonic	Johnny Cash
7 December	What You See Ain't Always What You Get	Luke Combs
14 December	What You See Ain't Always What You Get	Luke Combs
21 December	What You See Ain't Always What You Get	Luke Combs
28 December	What You See Ain't Always What You Get	Luke Combs

== See also ==
- 2020 in music
- List of number-one albums of 2020 (Australia)
