= List of number-one urban albums of 2021 (Australia) =

ARIA Charts number-one urban albums of 2021 < 2020 2022 >

Other Australian number-one charts of 2021
- albums
- singles
- urban singles
- dance singles
- club tracks
- digital tracks
- streaming tracks

Top Australian singles and albums of 2021
- Triple J Hottest 100
- top 25 singles
- top 25 albums

This is a list of albums that reached number-one on the ARIA Urban Albums Chart in 2021. The ARIA Urban Albums Chart is a weekly chart that ranks the best-performing urban albums in Australia. It is published by the Australian Recording Industry Association (ARIA), an organisation that collects music data for the weekly ARIA Charts. To be eligible to appear on the chart, the recording must be an album of a predominantly urban nature.

== Chart history ==
Issue date	Album	Artist(s)	Reference
4 January	F*ck Love	The Kid Laroi	
11 January	F*ck Love	The Kid Laroi	
18 January	F*ck Love	The Kid Laroi	
25 January	The Space Between	Illy	
1 February	F*ck Love	The Kid Laroi	
8 February	F*ck Love	The Kid Laroi	
15 February	F*ck Love	The Kid Laroi	
22 February	F*ck Love	The Kid Laroi	
1 March	F*ck Love	The Kid Laroi	
8 March	F*ck Love	The Kid Laroi	
15 March	F*ck Love	The Kid Laroi	
22 March	F*ck Love	The Kid Laroi	
29 March	F*ck Love	The Kid Laroi	
5 April	Clouds (The Mixtape)	NF	
12 April	F*ck Love	The Kid Laroi	
19 April	Roadrunner: New Light, New Machine	Brockhampton	
26 April	F*ck Love	The Kid Laroi	
3 May	F*ck Love	The Kid Laroi	
10 May	Khaled Khaled	DJ Khaled	
17 May	F*ck Love	The Kid Laroi	
24 May	The Off-Season	J. Cole	
31 May	The Off-Season	J. Cole	
7 June	The Off-Season	J. Cole	
14 June	F*ck Love	The Kid Laroi	
21 June	Hall of Fame	Polo G	
28 June	Hall of Fame	Polo G	
5 July	Call Me If You Get Lost	Tyler, the Creator	
12 July	Planet Her	Doja Cat	
19 July	Planet Her	Doja Cat	
26 July	Faith	Pop Smoke	
2 August	F*ck Love (Over You)	The Kid Laroi	
9 August	F*ck Love (Over You)	The Kid Laroi	
16 August	Planet Her	Doja Cat	
23 August	Planet Her	Doja Cat	
30 August	Planet Her	Doja Cat	
6 September	Donda	Kanye West	
13 September	Certified Lover Boy	Drake	
20 September	Certified Lover Boy	Drake	
27 September	Montero	Lil Nas X	
4 October	Certified Lover Boy	Drake	
11 October	Certified Lover Boy	Drake	
18 October	Certified Lover Boy	Drake	
25 October	Gela	Baker Boy	
1 November	Planet Her	Doja Cat	
8 November	Planet Her	Doja Cat	
15 November	Planet Her	Doja Cat	
22 November	An Evening with Silk Sonic	Silk Sonic	
29 November	Planet Her	Doja Cat	
6 December	Family Ties	Chillinit	
13 December	Planet Her	Doja Cat	
20 December	Fighting Demons	Juice Wrld	
27 December	Planet Her	Doja Cat	

== See also ==
- 2021 in music
- List of number-one albums of 2021 (Australia)
