= List of number-one country albums of 2021 (Australia) =

ARIA Charts number-one country albums of 2021 < 2020 2022 >

Other Australian number-one charts of 2021
- albums
- singles
- urban singles
- dance singles
- club tracks
- digital tracks
- streaming tracks

Top Australian singles and albums of 2021
- Triple J Hottest 100
- top 25 singles
- top 25 albums

These are the Australian Country number-one albums of 2021, per the ARIA Charts.

Issue date	Album	Artist
4 January	What You See Ain't Always What You Get	Luke Combs
11 January	What You See Ain't Always What You Get	Luke Combs
18 January	Dangerous: The Double Album	Morgan Wallen
25 January	Dangerous: The Double Album	Morgan Wallen
1 February	Dangerous: The Double Album	Morgan Wallen
8 February	Dangerous: The Double Album	Morgan Wallen
15 February	Dangerous: The Double Album	Morgan Wallen
22 February	Dangerous: The Double Album	Morgan Wallen
1 March	Songs from the Highway One	Adam Harvey
8 March	Dangerous: The Double Album	Morgan Wallen
15 March	What You See Ain't Always What You Get	Luke Combs
22 March	What You See Ain't Always What You Get	Luke Combs
29 March	The World Today	Troy Cassar-Daley
5 April	What You See Ain't Always What You Get	Luke Combs
12 April	What You See Ain't Always What You Get	Luke Combs
19 April	Fearless (Taylor's Version)	Taylor Swift
26 April	Fearless (Taylor's Version)	Taylor Swift
3 May	Fearless (Taylor's Version)	Taylor Swift
10 May	Fearless (Taylor's Version)	Taylor Swift
17 May	Fearless (Taylor's Version)	Taylor Swift
24 May	Where Have You Gone	Alan Jackson
31 May	What You See Ain't Always What You Get	Luke Combs
7 June	Raw	Shannon Noll
14 June	What You See Ain't Always What You Get	Luke Combs
21 June	What You See Ain't Always What You Get	Luke Combs
28 June	What You See Ain't Always What You Get	Luke Combs
5 July	What You See Ain't Always What You Get	Luke Combs
12 July	What You See Ain't Always What You Get	Luke Combs
19 July	What You See Ain't Always What You Get	Luke Combs
26 July	What You See Ain't Always What You Get	Luke Combs
2 August	What You See Ain't Always What You Get	Luke Combs
9 August	Kids on Cassette	The Wolfe Brothers
16 August	What You See Ain't Always What You Get	Luke Combs
23 August	What You See Ain't Always What You Get	Luke Combs
30 August	Gone Fishin'	Slim Dusty
6 September	What You See Ain't Always What You Get	Luke Combs
13 September	What You See Ain't Always What You Get	Luke Combs
20 September	Star-Crossed	Kacey Musgraves
27 September	What You See Ain't Always What You Get	Luke Combs
4 October	Darlinghurst	Darlinghurst
11 October	Fearless (Taylor's Version)	Taylor Swift
18 October	What You See Ain't Always What You Get	Luke Combs
25 October	What You See Ain't Always What You Get	Luke Combs
1 November	Breakin' Hearts	Hayley Jensen
8 November	What You See Ain't Always What You Get	Luke Combs
15 November	What You See Ain't Always What You Get	Luke Combs
22 November	Red (Taylor's Version)	Taylor Swift
29 November	Red (Taylor's Version)	Taylor Swift
6 December	Red (Taylor's Version)	Taylor Swift
13 December	Red (Taylor's Version)	Taylor Swift
20 December	Red (Taylor's Version)	Taylor Swift
27 December	Red (Taylor's Version)	Taylor Swift

== See also ==
- 2021 in music
- List of number-one albums of 2021 (Australia)
