= List of awards and nominations received by the Kid Laroi =

The Kid Laroi awards and nominations
Awards and nominations
Award	Wins	Nominations
American Music Awards	0	2
APRA Awards	4	6
ARIA Music Awards	2	7
Billboard Music Awards	5	8
Gaygalan Awards	0	1
Grammy Awards	0	2
iHeartRadio Music Awards	1	5
J Awards	0	1
LOS40 Music Awards	0	3
MTV Europe Music Awards	0	6
MTV Video Music Awards	0	5
National Indigenous Music Awards	1	3
People's Choice Awards	1	4
Rolling Stone Australia Awards	1	4
Top 40 Awards	1	3

Totals (Note: Certain award groups do not simply award one winner. They acknowledge several different recipients, have runners-up, and have third place. Since this is a specific recognition and is different from losing an award, runner-up mentions are considered wins in this award tally. For simplification and to avoid errors, each award in this list has been presumed to have had a prior nomination.)
- Wins: 20
- Nominations: 60

The following is a list of awards and nominations received by Australian rapper and singer the Kid Laroi. These include an APRA Award, two ARIA Awards and a National Indigenous Music Award. In 2021, his collaborations with Justin Bieber on the single "Stay" and Bieber's album Justice garnered him nominations for the Grammy Awards for Best New Artist and Album of the Year, respectively.

== Awards and nominations ==
=== American Music Awards ===
The American Music Awards (AMAs) is an annual American music awards show, generally held in the fall, created by Dick Clark in 1973 for ABC when the network's contract to air the Grammy Awards expired.

Year	Nominee / work	Award	Result	Ref.
2021	Himself	New Artist of the Year	Nominated	
2021	F*ck Love	Favorite Album - Pop	Nominated	

=== APRA Awards ===
The APRA Awards are several award ceremonies run in Australia by the Australasian Performing Right Association (APRA) to recognise composing and song writing skills, sales and airplay performance by its members annually.

Year	Nominee / work	Award	Result	Ref.
2021	Charlton Howard p.k.a. The Kid Laroi	Breakthrough Songwriter of the Year	Won	
2022	Himself	Songwriter of the Year	Won	
2022	"Stay" (with Justin Bieber)	Song of the Year	Won	
2022	"Without You"	Most Performed Australian Work	Nominated	
2022	"Without You"	Most Performed Hip Hop/Rap Work	Won	
2022	"My City" (with OneFour)	Most Performed Hip Hop/Rap Work	Nominated	
2023	"Thousand Miles"	Song of the Year	Shortlisted	
2023	"Stay" (with Justin Bieber)	Most Performed Australian Work	Won	
2023	"Stay" (with Justin Bieber)	Most Performed Pop Work	Won	
2023	"Not Sober" (with feat. Polo G & Stunna Gambino)	Most Performed Hip Hop / Rap Work	Nominated	
2024	"Love Again"	Most Performed Australian Work	Nominated	
2024	"Love Again"	Most Performed Pop Work	Nominated	

=== ARIA Music Awards ===
The ARIA Music Awards is an annual ceremony presented by Australian Recording Industry Association (ARIA), which recognise excellence, innovation, and achievement across all genres of the music of Australia. They commenced in 1987.

Year	Nominee / work	Award	Result	Ref.
2020	F*ck Love	Best Male Artist	Nominated	
2020	F*ck Love	Breakthrough Artist	Nominated	
2020	F*ck Love	Best Hip Hop Release	Nominated	
2021	"Stay" (with Justin Bieber)	Best Artist	Won	
2021	"Stay" (with Justin Bieber)	Best Pop Release	Won	
2021	"Without You" (with Miley Cyrus)	Single of the Year	Nominated	
2021	"Without You" (with Miley Cyrus)	Best Hip Hop Release	Nominated	
2022	"Thousand Miles"	Best Solo Artist	Nominated	
2022	"Thousand Miles"	Best Pop Release	Won	
2022	"Thousand Miles"	Song of the Year	Nominated	
2022	"Tokyo to Paris" (with Fivio Foreign)	Best Hip Hop / Rap Release	Nominated	
2022	End of the World Tour	Best Australian Live Act	Nominated	
2023	"Love Again"	Best Solo Artist	Nominated	
2023	"Love Again"	Song of the Year	Nominated	
2024	The First Time	Best Solo Artist	Nominated	
2024	The First Time	Best Hip Hop/Rap Release	Nominated	
2024	"Girls"	Best Pop Release	Nominated	
2024	"Nights Like This"	Song of the Year	Nominated	
2025	"How Does It Feel?"	Best Solo Artist	Nominated	
2025	"Baby I'm Back"	Best Hip Hop/Rap Release	Nominated	
2025	"Girls"	Song of the Year	Won	
2026	The Kid Laroi – Uber Eats: The Man Laroi (Special)	Best Use of an Australian Recording in an Advertisement	Nominated	
2026	"A Cold Play"	Song of the Year	Nominated	

=== Billboard Music Awards ===
Year	Nominee / work	Award	Result	Ref.
2022	Himself	Top New Artist	Nominated	
2022	F*ck Love	Top Rap Album	Nominated	
2022	"Stay" (with Justin Bieber)	Top Hot 100 Song	Won	
2022	"Stay" (with Justin Bieber)	Top Streaming Song	Won	
2022	"Stay" (with Justin Bieber)	Top Radio Song	Nominated	
2022	"Stay" (with Justin Bieber)	Top Collaboration	Won	
2022	"Stay" (with Justin Bieber)	Top Billboard Global 200 Song	Won	
2022	"Stay" (with Justin Bieber)	Top Billboard Global (Excl. U.S.) Song	Won	

=== Gaygalan Awards ===
The Gaygalan Awards are an annual event created to hand out prizes for LGBT achievements, established by Swedish magazine QX. They were first awarded in 1999.

Year	Nominee / work	Award	Result	Ref.
2022	"Stay" (with Justin Bieber)	International Song of the Year	Nominated	

=== Grammy Awards ===
Year	Nominee / work	Award	Result	Ref.
2022	Himself	Best New Artist	Nominated	
2022	Justice (as a featured artist)	Album of the Year	Nominated	

=== iHeartRadio Music Awards ===
The iHeartRadio Music Awards is an international music awards show founded by iHeartRadio in 2014.

Year	Nominee / work	Award	Result	Ref.
2022	Himself	Best New Pop Artist	Nominated	
2022	"Stay" (with Justin Bieber)	Song of the Year	Nominated	
2022	"Stay" (with Justin Bieber)	Best Collaboration	Won	
2022	"Stay" (with Justin Bieber)	Best Music Video	Nominated	
2022	"Stay" (with Justin Bieber)	TikTok Bop of the Year	Nominated	

=== iHeartRadio Titanium Awards ===
iHeartRadio Titanium Awards are awarded to an artist when their song reaches 1 Billion Spins across iHeartRadio Stations.

Year	Nominee / work	Award	Result	Ref.
2022	"Stay" (with Justin Bieber)	1 Billion Total Audience Spins on iHeartRadio Stations	Won	

=== J Awards ===
The J Awards are an annual series of Australian music awards that were established by the Australian Broadcasting Corporation's youth-focused radio station Triple J. They started in 2005.

Year	Nominee / work	Award	Result	Ref.
2020	F*ck Love	Australian Album of the Year	Nominated	
2024	The First Time	Australian Album of the Year	Nominated	

=== LOS40 Music Awards ===
The LOS40 Music Awards (formerly Premios Principales del Año / Premios 40 Principales) are awards presented since 2006 by Spanish radio station Los 40 (formerly known as Los 40 Principales).

Year	Nominee / work	Award	Result	Ref.
2021	Himself	Best International New Act	Nominated	
2021	"Without You"	Best International Song	Nominated	
2021	F*ck Love 3+: Over You	Best International Album	Nominated	

=== MTV Europe Music Awards ===
The MTV Europe Music Awards is an award presented by Viacom International Media Networks to honour artists and music in pop culture.

Year	Nominee / work	Award	Result	Ref.
2020	Himself	Best Australian Act	Nominated	
2021	Himself	Best New Act	Nominated	
2021	Himself	Best Push Act	Nominated	
2021	Himself	Best Australian Act	Nominated	
2021	"Stay" (with Justin Bieber)	Best Song	Nominated	
2021	"Stay" (with Justin Bieber)	Best Collaboration	Nominated	

=== MTV Video Music Awards ===
The MTV Video Music Awards, commonly abbreviated as VMA, were established in 1984 by MTV to celebrate the top music videos of the year.

Year	Nominee / work	Award	Result	Ref.
2021	Himself	Best New Artist	Nominated	
2021	"Without You"	Push Performance of the Year	Nominated	
2021	"Stay" (with Justin Bieber)	Song of Summer	Nominated	
2022	"Stay" (with Justin Bieber)	Best Collaboration	Nominated	
2022	"Stay" (with Justin Bieber)	Best Visual Effects	Nominated	

=== National Indigenous Music Awards ===
The National Indigenous Music Awards recognise excellence, innovation and leadership among Aboriginal and Torres Strait Islander musicians from throughout Australia. They commenced in 2004.

Year	Nominee / work	Award	Result	Ref.
2021	Himself	Artist of the Year	Won	
2021	"Without You"	Song of the Year	Nominated	
2021	F*ck Love	Album of the Year	Nominated	
2022	Himself	Artist of the Year	Nominated	
2023	Himself	Artist of the Year	Nominated	
2024	The First Time	Album of the Year	Nominated	
2024	"Bleed"	Song of the Year	Nominated	
2024	"Bleed"	Film Clip of the Year	Nominated	
2025	"Girls"	Song of the Year	Nominated	

=== Nickelodeon Kids' Choice Awards ===
The Nickelodeon Kids' Choice Awards is an annual American children's awards ceremony show that honors the year's biggest television, movie, and music acts, as voted by viewers.

Year	Nominee / work	Award	Result	Ref.
2022	"Stay" (with Justin Bieber)	Favorite Music Collaboration	Won	
2025	Himself	Favorite Global Music Star (Australia)	Nominated	

=== People's Choice Awards ===
The People's Choice Awards recognizing people in entertainment, voted online by the general public and fans.

Year	Nominee / work	Award	Result	Ref.
2021	Himself	New Artist of the Year	Nominated	
2021	"Stay" (with Justin Bieber)	Song of the Year	Nominated	
2021	"Stay" (with Justin Bieber)	Music Video of the Year	Nominated	
2021	"Stay" (with Justin Bieber)	Collaboration of the Year	Won	

=== Rolling Stone Australia Awards ===
The Rolling Stone Australia Awards are awarded annually in January or February by the Australian edition of Rolling Stone magazine for outstanding contributions to popular culture in the previous year.

Year	Nominee / work	Award	Result	Ref.
2021	F*ck Love	Best Record	Nominated	
2021	Himself	Rolling Stone Global Award	Nominated	
2022	"Stay"	Best Single	Nominated	
2022	Himself	Rolling Stone Global Award	Won	
2023	"Thousand Miles"	Best Single	Nominated	
2025	The Kid Laroi	Rolling Stone Global Award	Shortlisted	

=== Top 40 Awards ===
The Top 40 Awards is an annual awards show presented by Qmusic, a Dutch radio station in Netherlands which honors Dutch artists and foreign musicians. The awards held annually since 2018.

Year	Nominee / work	Award	Result	Ref.
2022	Himself	Best International Newcomer	Won	
2022	Himself	Best International Artist	Nominated	
2022	"Stay" (with Justin Bieber)	Biggest International Hits	Nominated	
