= List of number-one urban singles of 2021 (Australia) =

ARIA Charts number-one urban singles of 2021 < 2020 2022 >

Other Australian number-one charts of 2021
- albums
- singles
- dance singles
- club tracks
- digital tracks
- streaming tracks

Top Australian singles and albums of 2021
- Triple J Hottest 100
- top 25 singles
- top 25 albums

The ARIA Urban Chart is a chart that ranks the best-performing Urban tracks singles of Australia. It is published by the Australian Recording Industry Association (ARIA), an organisation who collect music data for the weekly ARIA Charts. To be eligible to appear on the chart, the recording must be a single of a predominantly urban nature.

== Chart history ==
Issue date	Song	Artist(s)	Reference
4 January	"Mood"	24kGoldn and Iann Dior	
11 January	"Mood"	24kGoldn and Iann Dior	
18 January	"Without You"	The Kid Laroi	
25 January	"Without You"	The Kid Laroi	
1 February	"Without You"	The Kid Laroi	
8 February	"Without You"	The Kid Laroi	
15 February	"Without You"	The Kid Laroi	
22 February	"Calling My Phone"	Lil Tjay and 6lack	
1 March	"Without You"	The Kid Laroi	
8 March	"Without You"	The Kid Laroi	
15 March	"Without You"	The Kid Laroi	
22 March	"Without You"	The Kid Laroi	
29 March	"Without You"	The Kid Laroi	
5 April	"Without You"	The Kid Laroi	
12 April	"Montero (Call Me by Your Name)"	Lil Nas X	
19 April	"Montero (Call Me by Your Name)"	Lil Nas X	
26 April	"Montero (Call Me by Your Name)"	Lil Nas X	
3 May	"Montero (Call Me by Your Name)"	Lil Nas X	
10 May	"Without You"	The Kid Laroi	
17 May	"Body"	Russ Millions and Tion Wayne	
24 May	"Body"	Russ Millions and Tion Wayne	
31 May	"Body"	Russ Millions and Tion Wayne	
7 June	"Kiss Me More"	Doja Cat featuring SZA	
14 June	"Kiss Me More"	Doja Cat featuring SZA	
21 June	"Kiss Me More"	Doja Cat featuring SZA	
28 June	"Kiss Me More"	Doja Cat featuring SZA	
5 July	"Kiss Me More"	Doja Cat featuring SZA	
12 July	"Kiss Me More"	Doja Cat featuring SZA	
19 July	"Stay"	The Kid Laroi and Justin Bieber	
26 July	"Stay"	The Kid Laroi and Justin Bieber	
2 August	"Stay"	The Kid Laroi and Justin Bieber	
9 August	"Stay"	The Kid Laroi and Justin Bieber	
16 August	"Stay"	The Kid Laroi and Justin Bieber	
23 August	"Stay"	The Kid Laroi and Justin Bieber	
30 August	"Stay"	The Kid Laroi and Justin Bieber	
6 September	"Stay"	The Kid Laroi and Justin Bieber	
13 September	"Stay"	The Kid Laroi and Justin Bieber	
20 September	"Stay"	The Kid Laroi and Justin Bieber	
27 September	"Stay"	The Kid Laroi and Justin Bieber	
4 October	"Stay"	The Kid Laroi and Justin Bieber	
11 October	"Stay"	The Kid Laroi and Justin Bieber	
18 October	"Stay"	The Kid Laroi and Justin Bieber	
25 October	"Stay"	The Kid Laroi and Justin Bieber	
1 November	"Stay"	The Kid Laroi and Justin Bieber	
8 November	"Stay"	The Kid Laroi and Justin Bieber	
15 November	"Stay"	The Kid Laroi and Justin Bieber	
22 November	"Stay"	The Kid Laroi and Justin Bieber	
29 November	"Stay"	The Kid Laroi and Justin Bieber	
6 December	"Stay"	The Kid Laroi and Justin Bieber	
13 December	"Stay"	The Kid Laroi and Justin Bieber	
20 December	"Stay"	The Kid Laroi and Justin Bieber	
27 December	"Stay"	The Kid Laroi and Justin Bieber	

== See also ==
- 2021 in music
- List of number-one singles of 2021 (Australia)
