= List of Top 25 singles for 2021 in Australia =

Top 25 singles of 2021 < 2020 2022 >

Other Australian top charts for 2021
- top 25 albums
- Triple J Hottest 100

Australian number-one charts of 2021
- albums
- singles
- urban singles
- dance singles
- club tracks
- digital tracks
- streaming tracks

The following lists the top 25 singles of 2021 in Australia from the Australian Recording Industry Association (ARIA) end-of-year singles chart.

"Heat Waves" by Glass Animals was the top selling single of 2021 in Australia, spending 6 weeks at No. 1 and 48 weeks in the Top 10, giving the band the record for most weeks in the Top 10 on the ARIA Singles Chart, and being certified seven times platinum. The Kid Laroi had the two highest-selling Australian songs of the year, both of which were certified five times platinum: "Stay" featuring Justin Bieber, which spent 14 consecutive weeks atop the chart, and "Without You" with Miley Cyrus, which topped the chart for a week and spent 29 weeks in the Top 10.

#	Title	Artist	Highest pos. reached
1	"Heat Waves"	Glass Animals	1
2	"Stay"	The Kid Laroi and Justin Bieber	1
3	"Drivers License"	Olivia Rodrigo	1
4	"Without You"	The Kid Laroi with Miley Cyrus	1
5	"Levitating"	Dua Lipa	4
6	"Good 4 U"	Olivia Rodrigo	1
7	"Bad Habits"	Ed Sheeran	1
8	"Save Your Tears"	The Weeknd	3
9	"Kiss Me More"	Doja Cat featuring SZA	2
10	"The Business"	Tiësto	4
11	"Montero (Call Me by Your Name)"	Lil Nas X	1
12	"Astronaut in the Ocean"	Masked Wolf	4
13	"Cold Heart (Pnau remix)"	Elton John and Dua Lipa	1
14	"Peaches"	Justin Bieber featuring Daniel Caesar and Giveon	1
15	"Mood"	24kGoldn featuring Iann Dior	1
16	"Blinding Lights"	The Weeknd	1
17	"Goosebumps (Remix)"	Travis Scott and HVME	5
18	"Cover Me in Sunshine"	Pink and Willow Sage Hart	6
19	"Friday"	Riton and Nightcrawlers featuring Mufasa & Hypeman	12
20	"Head & Heart"	Joel Corry featuring MNEK	2
21	"Beggin'"	Måneskin	3
22	"Dreams"	Fleetwood Mac	4
23	"Industry Baby"	Lil Nas X and Jack Harlow	4
24	"Fly Away"	Tones and I	4
25	"Body"	Russ Millions and Tion Wayne	1

== See also ==
- List of number-one singles of 2021 (Australia)
- List of top 10 singles for 2021 in Australia
- List of Top 25 albums for 2021 in Australia
- 2021 in music
- ARIA Charts
- List of Australian chart achievements and milestones
