= Unstable (song) =

2021 song by Justin Bieber featuring the Kid Laroi

Song by Justin Bieber featuring the Kid Laroi

from the album Justice
- Released: March 19, 2021
- Genre: Emo rap
- Length: 2:38
- Label: Def Jam
- Songwriters: Justin Bieber; Charlton Howard; James Gutch; Gregory Hein; Rami Yacoub; Britney Amaradio; Billy Walsh; Ayden Szymczak
- Producer: Jimmie Gutch

Visualizer
- "Unstable" on YouTube

"Unstable" is a song by Canadian singer Justin Bieber, featuring vocals from Australian rapper and singer the Kid Laroi. It was released through Def Jam Recordings on March 19, 2021, as the sixth track from Bieber's sixth studio album, Justice. Bieber and Laroi wrote the song with producer Jimmie Gutch and additional producers Aldae and Rami Yacoub, alongside Delacey, Billy Walsh, and Ayden Szymczak.

== Background and composition ==
"Unstable" is an emo rap song that combines elements of piano ballads and 2000s country songs. On the song, Bieber speaks about struggling to love himself in the past and his wife, American model Hailey Bieber, supporting him in his bad days as he sings in the first verse: "Sometimes I think I overthink / Then I start to feel anxiety / There were times I couldn't even breathe / But you never once abandoned me".

On March 19, 2021, the same day that the song and album were released, in an interview with Vogue, Bieber spoke on the nature of the song and revealed that it was about his wife supporting him throughout his dark times the previous year:

I was in a really, really bad place maybe a year ago. My wife was just there for me through it all. So the whole message is, like, you've been there for me while I'm really unstable. So that song really resonates with where I was at. There's probably a lot of people who have been in this position. That is always the goal: to make music that's relatable and can touch people.

== Critical reception ==
Billboard's Jason Lipshutz ranked "Unstable" as the eighth-best song on Justice, opining that Laroi "fits snugly in the concept here, matching Bieber's wounded intensity pound for pound". Craig Jenkins from Vulture gave a negative review, where he felt that the song contains "morose chords that don't go anywhere". Chris Willman of Variety saw the song as one of Bieber's strong moments on the album and felt that it shows that "he and his army of co-writers do find rhythms for him to expertly slide into that allow for nearly subtle syllabic echoing". Jon Caramanica of The New York Times complimented the collaboration with Laroi on the song. Similarly, Alexander Cole of HotNewHipHop opined that the song "makes for a dope collaboration that allows both artists to truly shine".

== Credits and personnel ==
Credits adapted from Tidal.

- Justin Bieber – lead vocals, songwriting
- The Kid Laroi – featured vocals, songwriting
- Jimmie Gutch – production, songwriting, programming
- Aldae – additional production, songwriting, background vocals
- Rami Yacoub – additional production, songwriting
- Delacey – songwriting
- Billy Walsh – songwriting
- Ayden Szymczak – songwriting
- Josh Gudwin – mixing, recording, vocal engineering, studio personnel
- Colin Leonard – mastering
- Heidi Wang – recording, assistant mixing
- Ryan Lytle – assistant recording

== Charts ==
Chart performance for "Unstable"
Chart (2021)	Peak position
Australia (ARIA)	22
Canada Hot 100 (Billboard)	17
Czech Republic Singles Digital (ČNS IFPI)	74
Denmark (Tracklisten)	12
Global 200 (Billboard)	28
New Zealand Hot Singles (RMNZ)	4
Norway (VG-lista)	33
Portugal (AFP)	55
Slovakia Singles Digital (ČNS IFPI)	28
Sweden (Sverigetopplistan)	53
UK Audio Streaming (OCC)	46
US Billboard Hot 100	62

== Certifications ==
Certifications for "Unstable"
Region	Certification	Certified units/sales
Australia (ARIA)	Gold	35,000^{‡}
Brazil (Pro-Música Brasil)	Platinum	40,000^{‡}
United States (RIAA)	Gold	500,000^{‡}
^{‡} Sales+streaming figures based on certification alone.
