= List of number-one singles of 2021 (Australia) =

ARIA Charts number-one singles of 2021 < 2020 2022 >

Other Australian number-one charts of 2021
- albums
- urban singles
- dance singles
- club tracks
- digital tracks
- streaming tracks

Top Australian singles and albums of 2021
- Triple J Hottest 100
- top 25 singles
- top 25 albums

The ARIA Singles Chart ranks the best-performing singles in Australia. Its data, published by the Australian Recording Industry Association, is based collectively on the weekly physical and digital sales and streams of singles. In 2021, 13 songs reached number one; the first, "Mood" by 24kGoldn featuring Iann Dior, returned to the top on the first chart of the year after spending nine weeks atop the chart in 2020. Eight artists, Olivia Rodrigo, Glass Animals, Daniel Caesar, Giveon, the Kid Laroi, Russ Millions, Tion Wayne and Dua Lipa reached the top for the first time.

Olivia Rodrigo and the Kid Laroi each achieved two number ones on the chart in 2021, while Justin Bieber spent the most weeks at number one of the year, with "Peaches" and the Kid Laroi duet "Stay" spending a combined total of 16 weeks atop the chart.

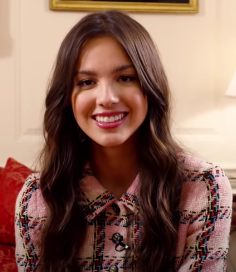
American singer-songwriter Olivia Rodrigo spent 11 weeks at number-one, first with her debut single "Drivers License", which spent six weeks at number one after debuting atop the chart, and "Good 4 U", which spent 5 weeks at number-one

Australian rapper, singer, and songwriter the Kid Laroi earned his first two number-one singles on the chart with "Without You", which spent one week at number one and "Stay", a collaboration with Canadian singer Justin Bieber, which spent 14 weeks at number one and became the longest running number one of the year.

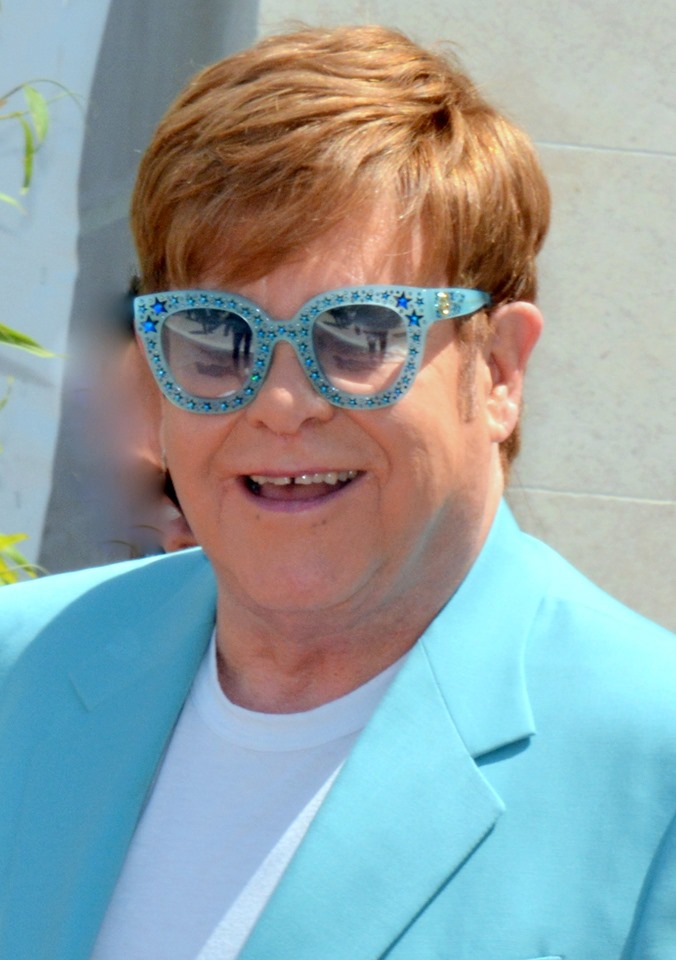
English singer, pianist and composer Elton John earned his first number-one since 1997's "Something About the Way You Look Tonight" / "Candle in the Wind 1997" with "Cold Heart (Pnau remix)", a duet with English-Albanian singer Dua Lipa, which consequently became her first number one on the chart.

== Chart history ==
Key
†	Indicates best-performing single of 2021

Issue date	Song	Artist(s)	Ref.
4 January	"Mood"	24kGoldn featuring Iann Dior	
11 January	"Mood"	24kGoldn featuring Iann Dior	
18 January	"Drivers License"	Olivia Rodrigo	
25 January	"Drivers License"	Olivia Rodrigo	
1 February	"Drivers License"	Olivia Rodrigo	
8 February	"Drivers License"	Olivia Rodrigo	
15 February	"Drivers License"	Olivia Rodrigo	
22 February	"Drivers License"	Olivia Rodrigo	
1 March	"Heat Waves" †	Glass Animals	
8 March	"Heat Waves" †	Glass Animals	
15 March	"Heat Waves" †	Glass Animals	
22 March	"Heat Waves" †	Glass Animals	
29 March	"Heat Waves" †	Glass Animals	
5 April	"Heat Waves" †	Glass Animals	
12 April	"Peaches"	Justin Bieber featuring Daniel Caesar and Giveon	
19 April	"Peaches"	Justin Bieber featuring Daniel Caesar and Giveon	
26 April	"Montero (Call Me by Your Name)"	Lil Nas X	
3 May	"Montero (Call Me by Your Name)"	Lil Nas X	
10 May	"Without You"	The Kid Laroi	
17 May	"Body"	Russ Millions and Tion Wayne	
24 May	"Body"	Russ Millions and Tion Wayne	
31 May	"Good 4 U"	Olivia Rodrigo	
7 June	"Good 4 U"	Olivia Rodrigo	
14 June	"Good 4 U"	Olivia Rodrigo	
21 June	"Good 4 U"	Olivia Rodrigo	
28 June	"Good 4 U"	Olivia Rodrigo	
5 July	"Bad Habits"	Ed Sheeran	
12 July	"Bad Habits"	Ed Sheeran	
19 July	"Stay"	The Kid Laroi and Justin Bieber	
26 July	"Stay"	The Kid Laroi and Justin Bieber	
2 August	"Stay"	The Kid Laroi and Justin Bieber	
9 August	"Stay"	The Kid Laroi and Justin Bieber	
16 August	"Stay"	The Kid Laroi and Justin Bieber	
23 August	"Stay"	The Kid Laroi and Justin Bieber	
30 August	"Stay"	The Kid Laroi and Justin Bieber	
6 September	"Stay"	The Kid Laroi and Justin Bieber	
13 September	"Stay"	The Kid Laroi and Justin Bieber	
20 September	"Stay"	The Kid Laroi and Justin Bieber	
27 September	"Stay"	The Kid Laroi and Justin Bieber	
4 October	"Stay"	The Kid Laroi and Justin Bieber	
11 October	"Stay"	The Kid Laroi and Justin Bieber	
18 October	"Stay"	The Kid Laroi and Justin Bieber	
25 October	"Easy on Me"	Adele	
1 November	"Easy on Me"	Adele	
8 November	"Cold Heart (Pnau remix)"	Elton John and Dua Lipa	
15 November	"Cold Heart (Pnau remix)"	Elton John and Dua Lipa	
22 November	"All Too Well (Taylor's Version)"	Taylor Swift	
29 November	"Easy on Me"	Adele	
6 December	"Easy on Me"	Adele	
13 December	"Cold Heart (Pnau remix)"	Elton John and Dua Lipa	
20 December	"Cold Heart (Pnau remix)"	Elton John and Dua Lipa	
27 December	"Cold Heart (Pnau remix)"	Elton John and Dua Lipa	

== Number-one artists ==
List of number-one artists, with total weeks spent at number one shown
Position	Artist	Weeks at No. 1
1	Justin Bieber	16
2	The Kid Laroi	15
3	Olivia Rodrigo	11
4	Glass Animals	6
5	Dua Lipa	5
5	Elton John	5
6	Adele	4
7	24kGoldn	2
7	Iann Dior	2
7	Daniel Caesar	2
7	Giveon	2
7	Lil Nas X	2
7	Russ Millions	2
7	Tion Wayne	2
7	Ed Sheeran	2
8	Taylor Swift	1

== See also ==
- 2021 in music
- List of number-one albums of 2021 (Australia)
