= List of number-one albums of 2021 (Australia) =

ARIA Charts number-one albums of 2021 < 2020 2022 >

Other Australian number-one charts of 2021
- singles
- urban singles
- dance singles
- club tracks
- digital tracks
- streaming tracks

Top Australian singles and albums of 2021
- Triple J Hottest 100
- top 25 singles
- top 25 albums

The ARIA Albums Chart ranks the best-performing albums and extended plays (EPs) in Australia. Its data, published by the Australian Recording Industry Association, is based collectively on the weekly physical and digital sales of albums and EPs. In 2021, 34 albums claimed the top spot; Taylor Swift achieved three number-ones during the year, while her album Evermore spent the first two weeks of the year at number one after spending two weeks atop the chart in December 2020. 14 acts, Barry Gibb, Joff Bush (the composer of the Australian animated series Bluey), the Kid Laroi, the Rubens, Tash Sultana, Architects, Skegss, London Grammar, Olivia Rodrigo, Tones and I, the Jungle Giants, Luke Hemmings, Lil Nas X and Ruby Fields, achieved their first number-one album.

Rodrigo spent the most weeks at number one in 2021 with her album Sour spending eight non-consecutive weeks at the top, while Swift had the most, achieving three number-one albums during the year (Evermore, Fearless (Taylor's Version) and Red (Taylor's Version)).

== Chart history ==
Key
| † | Indicates best-performing album of 2021 |

List of number-one albums
| Date | Album | Artist(s) | Ref. |
|---|---|---|---|
| 4 January | Evermore | Taylor Swift | |
| 11 January | Evermore | Taylor Swift | |
| 18 January | Greenfields | Barry Gibb | |
| 25 January | The Space Between | Illy | |
| 1 February | Bluey: The Album | Joff Bush | |
| 8 February | F*ck Love (Savage) | The Kid Laroi | |
| 15 February | Medicine at Midnight | Foo Fighters | |
| 22 February | 0202 | The Rubens | |
| 1 March | Terra Firma | Tash Sultana | |
| 8 March | For Those That Wish to Exist | Architects | |
| 15 March | When You See Yourself | Kings of Leon | |
| 22 March | Future Nostalgia | Dua Lipa | |
| 29 March | Justice | Justin Bieber | |
| 5 April | Rehearsal | Skegss | |
| 12 April | Justice | Justin Bieber | |
| 19 April | Fearless (Taylor's Version) | Taylor Swift | |
| 26 April | Californian Soil | London Grammar | |
| 3 May | Justice | Justin Bieber | |
| 10 May | Cry Forever | Amy Shark | |
| 17 May | Cry Forever | Amy Shark | |
| 24 May | Bridge over Troubled Dreams | Delta Goodrem | |
| 31 May | Sour † | Olivia Rodrigo | |
| 7 June | Sour † | Olivia Rodrigo | |
| 14 June | Sour † | Olivia Rodrigo | |
| 21 June | Sour † | Olivia Rodrigo | |
| 28 June | Sour † | Olivia Rodrigo | |
| 5 July | Sour † | Olivia Rodrigo | |
| 12 July | Flesh and Blood | Jimmy Barnes | |
| 19 July | Sour † | Olivia Rodrigo | |
| 26 July | Welcome to the Madhouse | Tones and I | |
| 2 August | Love Signs | The Jungle Giants | |
| 9 August | Happier Than Ever | Billie Eilish | |
| 16 August | Happier Than Ever | Billie Eilish | |
| 23 August | When Facing the Things We Turn Away From | Luke Hemmings | |
| 30 August | Solar Power | Lorde | |
| 6 September | Donda | Kanye West | |
| 13 September | Certified Lover Boy | Drake | |
| 20 September | Certified Lover Boy | Drake | |
| 27 September | Montero | Lil Nas X | |
| 4 October | Been Doin' It for a Bit | Ruby Fields | |
| 11 October | Certified Lover Boy | Drake | |
| 18 October | Sour † | Olivia Rodrigo | |
| 25 October | Music of the Spheres | Coldplay | |
| 1 November | Surrender | Rüfüs Du Sol | |
| 8 November | = | Ed Sheeran | |
| 15 November | Voyage | ABBA | |
| 22 November | Red (Taylor's Version) | Taylor Swift | |
| 29 November | 30 | Adele | |
| 6 December | 30 | Adele | |
| 13 December | 30 | Adele | |
| 20 December | 30 | Adele | |
| 27 December | 30 | Adele | |

== Number-one artists ==
List of number-one artists, with total weeks spent at number one shown
| Position | Artist | Weeks at No. 1 |
|---|---|---|
| 1 | Olivia Rodrigo | 8 |
| 2 | Adele | 5 |
| 3 | Taylor Swift | 4 |
| 4 | Justin Bieber | 3 |
| 4 | Drake | 3 |
| 5 | Amy Shark | 2 |
| 5 | Billie Eilish | 2 |
| 6 | Barry Gibb | 1 |
| 6 | Illy | 1 |
| 6 | Joff Bush | 1 |
| 6 | The Kid Laroi | 1 |
| 6 | Foo Fighters | 1 |
| 6 | The Rubens | 1 |
| 6 | Tash Sultana | 1 |
| 6 | Architects | 1 |
| 6 | Kings of Leon | 1 |
| 6 | Dua Lipa | 1 |
| 6 | Skegss | 1 |
| 6 | London Grammar | 1 |
| 6 | Delta Goodrem | 1 |
| 6 | Jimmy Barnes | 1 |
| 6 | Tones and I | 1 |
| 6 | The Jungle Giants | 1 |
| 6 | Luke Hemmings | 1 |
| 6 | Lorde | 1 |
| 6 | Kanye West | 1 |
| 6 | Lil Nas X | 1 |
| 6 | Ruby Fields | 1 |
| 6 | Coldplay | 1 |
| 6 | Rüfüs Du Sol | 1 |
| 6 | Ed Sheeran | 1 |
| 6 | ABBA | 1 |

== See also ==
- 2021 in music
- ARIA Charts
- List of number-one singles of 2021 (Australia)
