= List of number-one club tracks of 2021 (Australia) =

ARIA Charts number-one club tracks of 2021 < 2020 2022 >

Other Australian number-one charts of 2021
- albums
- singles
- urban singles
- dance singles
- digital tracks
- streaming tracks

Top Australian singles and albums of 2021
- Triple J Hottest 100
- top 25 singles
- top 25 albums

This is the list of number-one tracks on the ARIA Club Chart in 2021, and is compiled by the Australian Recording Industry Association (ARIA) from weekly DJ reports.

== 2021 ==
Date		Song	Artist(s)	Reference
January	4	"Perfect"	Princess Superstar vs. Supermini & Frankie Romano	
January	11	"Perfect"	Princess Superstar vs. Supermini & Frankie Romano	
January	18	"We Still No Speak Americano"Sllash & Doppe / Jaxx Da Fishwork mix)	Yolanda Be Cool and DCUP	
January	25	"Let's Rock"	Jared Marston	
February	1	"Heartbreaker"	Colour Castle featuring Ruby Turner	
February	8	"Heartbreaker"	Colour Castle featuring Ruby Turner	
February	15	"The Heat"	Tim Light	
February	22	"Heartbreaker"	Colour Castle featuring Ruby Turner	
March	1	"Heartbreaker"	Colour Castle featuring Ruby Turner	
March	8	"Holding On"	Jolyon Petch	
March	15	"Holding On"	Jolyon Petch	
March	22	"Holding On"	Jolyon Petch	
March	29	"Midas Touch"	Supermini & Frankie Romano	
April	5	"Midas Touch"	Supermini & Frankie Romano	
April	12	"Midas Touch"	Supermini & Frankie Romano	
April	19	"Midas Touch"	Supermini & Frankie Romano	
April	26	"Dreams"	Jolyon Petch	
May	3	"Dreams"	Jolyon Petch	
May	10	"Dreams"	Jolyon Petch	
May	17	"Dreams"	Jolyon Petch	
May	24	"Dreams"	Jolyon Petch	
May	31	"Dreams"	Jolyon Petch	
June	7	"Dreams"	Jolyon Petch	
June	14	"Chase"	Vassy and Bonka	
June	21	"Tell Me Why"	Elektrik Disko	
June	28	"Tell Me Why"	Elektrik Disko	
July	5	"Tell Me Why"	Elektrik Disko	
July	12	"Playbox"	Purple Disco Machine	
July	19	"Love Bizarre"	Wildfire featuring Amber Ferraro	
July	26	"Love Bizarre"	Wildfire featuring Amber Ferraro	
August	2	"Organ Donor"	Lowdown	
August	9	"Party People"	Mind Electric	
August	16	"Party People"	Mind Electric	
August	23	"Knock Knock"	Mell Hall featuring Thandi Phoenix	
August	30	"Knock Knock"	Mell Hall featuring Thandi Phoenix	
September	6	"Knock Knock"	Mell Hall featuring Thandi Phoenix	
September	13	"Knock Knock"	Mell Hall featuring Thandi Phoenix	
September	20	"Knock Knock"	Mell Hall featuring Thandi Phoenix	
September	27	"Knock Knock"	Mell Hall featuring Thandi Phoenix	
October	4	"Knock Knock"	Mell Hall featuring Thandi Phoenix	
October	11	"Knock Knock"	Mell Hall featuring Thandi Phoenix	
October	18	"Knock Knock"	Mell Hall featuring Thandi Phoenix	
October	25	"Happiness"	Super Disco Club featuring Sadsko Pointer	
November	1	"Happiness"	Super Disco Club featuring Sadsko Pointer	
November	8	"Happiness"	Super Disco Club featuring Sadsko Pointer	
November	15	"Happiness"	Super Disco Club featuring Sadsko Pointer	
November	22	"Groovejet (If This Ain't Love)" (Purple Disco Machine & Lorenz Rhode mix)	Spiller featuring Sophie Ellis-Bextor	
November	29	"Groovejet (If This Ain't Love)" (Purple Disco Machine & Lorenz Rhode mix)	Spiller featuring Sophie Ellis-Bextor	
December	6	"Groovejet (If This Ain't Love)" (Purple Disco Machine & Lorenz Rhode mix)	Spiller featuring Sophie Ellis-Bextor	
December	13	"Do It to It"	Acraze featuring Cherish	
December	20	"Do It to It"	Acraze featuring Cherish	
December	27	"Do It to It"	Acraze featuring Cherish	

== Number-one artists ==
Position	Artist	Weeks at No. 1
1	Jolyon Petch	10
2	Mell Hall	9
2	Thandi Phoenix (As Featuring)	9
3	Frankie Romano	6
3	Supermini	6
4	Colour Castle	4
4	Ruby Turner (as featuring)	4
4	Super Disco Club	4
4	Sadsko Pointer	4
5	Elektrik Disko	3
5	Spiller	3
5	Sophie Ellis-Bextor (As featuring)	3
5	Acraze	3
5	Cherish	3
6	Princess Superstar	2
6	Wildfire	2
6	Amber Ferraro (as featuring)	2
6	Mind Electric	2
7	Yolanda Be Cool	1
7	DCUP	1
7	Jared Marston	1
7	Tim Light	1
7	Vassy	1
7	Bonka	1
7	Purple Disco Machine	1
7	Lowdown	1

== See also ==
- ARIA Charts
- 2021 in music
