= List of number-one dance singles of 2021 (Australia) =

ARIA Charts number-one dance singles of 2021 < 2020 2022 >

Other Australian number-one charts of 2021
- albums
- singles
- urban singles
- club tracks
- digital tracks
- streaming tracks

Top Australian singles and albums of 2021
- Triple J Hottest 100
- top 25 singles
- top 25 albums

The ARIA Dance Chart is a chart that ranks the best-performing dance singles of Australia. It is published by Australian Recording Industry Association (ARIA), an organisation who collect music data for the weekly ARIA Charts. To be eligible to appear on the chart, the recording must be a single, and be "predominantly of a dance nature, or with a featured track of a dance nature, or included in the ARIA Club Chart or a comparable overseas chart".

== Chart history ==
Date	Song	Artist(s)	Ref.
4 January	"Head & Heart"	Joel Corry featuring MNEK	
11 January	"Head & Heart"	Joel Corry featuring MNEK	
18 January	"Head & Heart"	Joel Corry featuring MNEK	
25 January	"Head & Heart"	Joel Corry featuring MNEK	
1 February	"Head & Heart"	Joel Corry featuring MNEK	
8 February	"The Business"	Tiësto	
15 February	"Heat Waves"	Glass Animals	
22 February	"Heat Waves"	Glass Animals	
1 March	"Heat Waves"	Glass Animals	
8 March	"Heat Waves"	Glass Animals	
15 March	"Heat Waves"	Glass Animals	
22 March	"Heat Waves"	Glass Animals	
29 March	"Heat Waves"	Glass Animals	
5 April	"Heat Waves"	Glass Animals	
12 April	"Heat Waves"	Glass Animals	
19 April	"Heat Waves"	Glass Animals	
26 April	"Heat Waves"	Glass Animals	
3 May	"Heat Waves"	Glass Animals	
10 May	"Heat Waves"	Glass Animals	
17 May	"Heat Waves"	Glass Animals	
24 May	"Heat Waves"	Glass Animals	
31 May	"Heat Waves"	Glass Animals	
7 June	"Heat Waves"	Glass Animals	
14 June	"Heat Waves"	Glass Animals	
21 June	"Heat Waves"	Glass Animals	
28 June	"Heat Waves"	Glass Animals	
5 July	"Heat Waves"	Glass Animals	
12 July	"Heat Waves"	Glass Animals	
19 July	"Heat Waves"	Glass Animals	
26 July	"Heat Waves"	Glass Animals	
2 August	"Heat Waves"	Glass Animals	
9 August	"Heat Waves"	Glass Animals	
16 August	"Heat Waves"	Glass Animals	
23 August	"Heat Waves"	Glass Animals	
30 August	"Heat Waves"	Glass Animals	
6 September	"Heat Waves"	Glass Animals	
13 September	"Heat Waves"	Glass Animals	
20 September	"Heat Waves"	Glass Animals	
27 September	"Heat Waves"	Glass Animals	
4 October	"Heat Waves"	Glass Animals	
11 October	"Heat Waves"	Glass Animals	
18 October	"Heat Waves"	Glass Animals	
25 October	"Heat Waves"	Glass Animals	
1 November	"Heat Waves"	Glass Animals	
8 November	"Heat Waves"	Glass Animals	
15 November	"Heat Waves"	Glass Animals	
22 November	"Heat Waves"	Glass Animals	
29 November	"Heat Waves"	Glass Animals	
6 December	"Heat Waves"	Glass Animals	
13 December	"Heat Waves"	Glass Animals	
20 December	"Heat Waves"	Glass Animals	
27 December	"Heat Waves"	Glass Animals	

== Number-one artists ==
Position	Artist	Weeks at No. 1
1	Glass Animals	46
2	Joel Corry	5
2	MNEK (as featuring)	5
3	Tiësto	1

== See also ==
- ARIA Charts
- 2021 in music
