= Stay (The Kid Laroi and Justin Bieber song) =

2021 single by the Kid Laroi and Justin Bieber

Single by the Kid Laroi and Justin Bieber

from the album F*ck Love 3: Over You
- Released: 9 July 2021
- Recorded: 2020
- Genre: Electropop; pop rap; pop rock; synth-pop; new wave; hyperpop
- Length: 2:21
- Label: Grade A; Columbia
- Songwriters: Charlton Howard; Justin Bieber; Magnus Høiberg; Charlie Puth; Omer Fedi; Blake Slatkin; Michael Mule; Isaac De Boni; Subhaan Rahmaan
- Producers: Cashmere Cat; Charlie Puth; Omer Fedi; Blake Slatkin

The Kid Laroi singles chronology
"Without You" (2020)	"Stay" (2021)	"Thousand Miles" (2022)

Justin Bieber singles chronology
"Let It Go" (2021)	"Stay" (2021)	"Essence" (remix) (2021)

Music video
- "Stay" on YouTube

"Stay" (stylized in all caps) is a song by Australian rapper and singer the Kid Laroi and Canadian singer Justin Bieber. It was released through Grade A Productions and Columbia Records on 9 July 2021, as the lead single (sixth overall) from Laroi's reloaded mixtape, F*ck Love 3: Over You. Laroi and Bieber wrote the song with Haan, FnZ members Finatik & Zac, and producers Cashmere Cat, Charlie Puth, Omer Fedi, and Blake Slatkin. The song marks the second collaboration between the two artists, following Bieber's song, "Unstable", a track from his sixth studio album, Justice (2021).

"Stay" reached number one on the Billboard Hot 100, becoming Laroi's first chart-topping single and Bieber's eighth, and additionally topped the Billboard Global 200. Furthermore, it reached number one in 21 other countries, including their respective natives Australia and Canada, along with Germany, the Netherlands, New Zealand, Norway, South Korea, and Sweden. It also peaked within the top ten in 18 other countries. At the 2021 ARIA Music Awards, the song won the ARIA Award for Best Pop Release, which resulted in Laroi and Bieber both winning the ARIA Award for Best Artist. At the APRA Music Awards of 2022, the song won the award for Song of the Year.

== Background ==
On 20 September 2020, Laroi shared a snippet of the song on an Instagram live stream, followed by a longer snippet in better quality that was previewed on a live stream from Rolling Loud on 29 October 2020. Bieber's contribution to the song was revealed on 31 May 2021. The song leaked in full on a Discord server on 2 June 2021.

"Stay" marks Laroi's first major single release as a lead artist in 2021 and Bieber's first major single as a lead artist since the release of his second extended play, Freedom, which was released in April 2021. On 3 June 2021, Scooter Braun, who has been Bieber's manager from the start of his career, also became Laroi's manager, until Laroi left and joined Adam Leber at Rebel Management on 27 September 2021.

Laroi had the song for about a year before its release. He created the song while spending time with producers Charlie Puth, Omer Fedi, and Blake Slatkin at Slatkin's house. Puth played the melody of the song on the keyboard, but Laroi ended up liking it and wanted to get it in production software Pro Tools to use it to create a song. He felt that "it was probably the most organic way of making a song I've ever done – ever". Laroi thought Bieber "would sound perfect", so he went to the studio at which Bieber records; they finished recording the song, but Bieber was hesitant about whether his vocals sounded good or not.

== Composition and lyrics ==
"Stay"
A short 30-second audio sample of "Stay", where the song reaches its climax as Laroi and Bieber's voices join together in the last chorus.

"Stay" is a fast-paced electropop, pop rap, pop rock, and synth-pop song. It is set in the key of D♭ major and incorporates piano keys, heavy drums, and "splattering" synths. The upward-darting keyboard riff, made on a Roland Juno-60 synthesizer owned by Slatkin, serves as the song's spine and eventually becomes the chorus melody. Over a repeated melodic cell, Laroi and Bieber switch between head voice and chest voice on a minor sixth. Jon Caramanica of The New York Times described the track as a "hyper-slick" hybridisation of new wave and pop-punk. Some critics found similarities between it and the music from Bieber's sixth studio album, Justice (2021). Justin Curto from Vulture compared the song's sound to Justice single "Hold On" and album tracks "Die for You" and "Somebody". Stereogum's Chris DeVille characterised it as "[p]ost-SoundCloud pop-rap as effervescent Justice-style '80s pop".

The "heartbreak-fueled" lyrics to "Stay" enforce Laroi's toxic behaviour as he sets up a story about a troubled relationship where he is at fault. In the chorus, he sings about his broken promises before begging for his partner to stay with him: "I do the same thing I told you that I never would / I told you I'd change, even when I knew I never could." Robert Rowat of CBC Music interpreted the lines as "an admission of weakness, if not a promise to be better". Bieber's verse echoes similar sentiments as he belts out lyrics about being unable to live without his loved one: "When I'm away from you, I miss your touch / You're the reason I believe in love." The song reaches its climax as Laroi and Bieber's voices join in the last chorus.

== Release and promotion ==
On 16 June 2021, Laroi and Bieber hinted at another collaboration. Leading up to its release, the two artists both teased the song multiple times on their respective social media accounts by posting snippets and teasing the lyrics. Laroi also had previously stated on social media that Ron Perry, the label boss of Columbia Records would not release the song, to which Laroi asked his fans to repeatedly spam Perry on Instagram, which would hopefully change his mind into releasing it. Laroi posted a picture of him at a basketball game on Instagram on 27 June 2021, holding a piece of paper that wrote the song title and the then-questionable release date, to which Puth teased his involvement of the song by commenting "Yessssssssss". Three days later, Laroi shared a pre-order link in order to reveal the cover art, which would be posted the following day.

== Critical reception ==
The song has received generally positive reviews. Caramanica found "Stay" to be "[b]racingly effective", considering it a more effective pairing of Laroi and Bieber than their previous collaboration on "Unstable" from the latter's sixth studio album, Justice. Tyler Jenke from Rolling Stone Australia wrote that "the slick new tune" is "undoubtedly one that lives up [to] the hype". Jordan Rose of Complex believed that the track has Laroi and Bieber "leaning into their strengths". Alex Zidel from HotNewHipHop felt that the song is "every bit as infectious as [one] would expect" and thought of it to be "a solid pop offering for the summer". Jason Lipshutz of Billboard opined that the song "sounds like it should push [Laroi] to a new level" of stardom. Uproxx contributing writer Carolyn Droke stated that the "buoyant track['s]" combination of "a euphoric chorus and a driving beat" will make it "the next song of the summer". Rowat commended Laroi and Bieber's partnership as "one of the year's best surprises" and said that the song "capitalizes on both singers' skills as falsettists". DeVille described the song as "maniacally catchy" and thought it musically feels like Laroi "blasting off into a new frontier of crossover success". Curto called the track "a high-energy, synth-filled pop banger". However, he later criticised the song for being "some of Laroi's most anonymous work yet" and concluded that "it could just as easily be a hit for the Weeknd or Post Malone".

== Accolades ==
Awards and nominations for "Stay"
Year	Organization	Award	Result	Ref.
2021	MTV Video Music Awards	Song of Summer	Nominated	
2021	ARIA Music Awards	Best Artist	Won	
2021	ARIA Music Awards	Best Pop Release	Won	
2022	Nickelodeon Kids' Choice Awards	Favorite Music Collaboration	Won	
2022	APRA Music Awards	Song of the Year	Won	
2022	Billboard Music Awards	Top Hot 100 Song	Won	
2022	Billboard Music Awards	Top Streaming Song	Won	
2022	Billboard Music Awards	Top Radio Song	Nominated	
2022	Billboard Music Awards	Top Collaboration	Won	
2022	Billboard Music Awards	Top Billboard Global 200 Song	Won	
2022	Billboard Music Awards	Top Billboard Global (Excl. U.S.) Song	Won	
2022	MTV Video Music Awards	Song of the Year	Nominated	
2022	MTV Video Music Awards	Best Collaboration	Nominated	
2022	MTV Video Music Awards	Best Visual Effects	Nominated	
2022	American Music Awards	Collaboration of the Year	Nominated	
2022	American Music Awards	Favorite Pop Song	Nominated	

== Commercial performance ==
"Stay" debuted at number one on the ARIA Singles Chart for the week of 19 July 2021. It became Laroi's second number-one single in Australia after "Without You" topped the chart for a week in May and Bieber's fifth as a lead artist. It held on to its position for 14 consecutive weeks, becoming the longest-running number-one single of 2021. In January 2022, the song returned to the number one spot following the 2021 Triple J Hottest 100's announcement and remained there for three additional weeks. Its 17-week reign became the longest run at the top of the ARIA Singles Chart by a male artist(s) and the second-longest overall.

In New Zealand, "Stay" entered at the top of the New Zealand Singles Chart, securing Laroi's first number-one single in the country and Bieber's 11th overall. The song spent more weeks at number one than any other by an Australian male, maintaining that position for 11 non-consecutive weeks.

In the United Kingdom, "Stay" entered at number five on the UK Singles Chart on 16 July 2021 – for the week ending dated 22 July 2021 – making it Laroi's second top ten hit in Britain and Bieber's 27th. It rose three places to number two a week later, behind Ed Sheeran's "Bad Habits" during its fourth week at the summit. It stayed at number two for six weeks and became Laroi's joint-highest-charting song in the UK along with "Without You".

In Ireland, "Stay" entered at number three on the Irish Singles Chart as the week's highest new entry. The track became Bieber's 60th top 50 single in the Irish Republic. The song moved up a spot the following week to a new peak of number two behind "Bad Habits" for eight weeks, becoming Laroi's highest-charting song in Ireland.

In the United States, "Stay" debuted at number three on the Billboard Hot 100, starting with 34.7 million streams, 12.9 million in radio audience, and 12,000 in sales. It entered atop the Streaming Songs chart, becoming Laroi's first and Bieber's sixth leader there, and at number five on the Digital Song Sales chart. Laroi earned his third top 10 hit on the Hot 100 and a new career best, surpassing the number eight peak of "Without You" with Miley Cyrus. In addition to Bieber getting his 24th top 10 hit on the chart, he became the youngest artist to have 100 entries appear on the Hot 100 at 27 years and four months old. On the week of 14 August 2021, the song topped the Billboard Hot 100, dethroning BTS' "Butter" and becoming Laroi's first and Bieber's eighth number-one hit on the chart. It stayed at the number-one position for four consecutive weeks, surpassing "Sorry" as Bieber's longest reign as a lead artist. The song also became Laroi's first number one on the Pop Airplay chart (where it went on to spend 13 weeks at #1, the second longest run at #1 in the history of the chart, behind Ace of Base's "The Sign"), while Bieber tied Bruno Mars for the most number ones on the chart among solo males with nine each. On the week of 25 September 2021, "Stay" returned to number one on the Hot 100 for a fifth week as it topped the Radio Songs chart for the first time, becoming the first and fifth leader for Laroi and Bieber, respectively. The song spent seven non-consecutive weeks at number one on the Hot 100. It additionally logged 14 non-consecutive weeks at number two of the Hot 100. As of the chart dated 2 April 2022, "Stay" also broke the records for the most weeks spent in the Hot 100's top two and top three spots, with 21 and 23 weeks respectively. The record has since been surpassed by Harry Styles' "As It Was" with 25 and 29 weeks, respectively in 2022. On 18 April 2022, "Stay" became the first song in history to spend its first 40 weeks consecutively in the top 10 of the Hot 100. On 23 June 2023, the song was certified diamond by the Recording Industry Association of America (RIAA).

On the Rolling Stone Top 100, the song earned Laroi his first number one with 30.8 million streams on opening week. It spent seven straight weeks at number one on the chart, becoming just the third song to do so after Roddy Ricch's "The Box" and Rodrigo's "Good 4 U". The track was named "2021's Song of the Summer" by Variety based on a song project report from Alpha Data, where it earned 1.5 million units. As of 28 October 2021, the song has accumulated 1.1 billion in airplay audience and 537.6 million U.S. streams and has sold 177,200 downloads.

"Stay" additionally topped the charts in Austria, both regions of Belgium (Flanders and Wallonia), Bieber's native Canada, the Czech Republic, Denmark, Finland, Germany, Iceland, India, Israel, Malaysia, the Netherlands, Norway, Singapore, Slovakia, South Korea, and Sweden, and peaked within the top 10 in France, Italy, the Japan Hot 100, Portugal, and Switzerland. Worldwide, the song debuted at number two on the Billboard Global 200 behind BTS's "Permission to Dance". It opened with 76.3 million streams and 18,600 sold. The song ascended to number one on its third week with 75.1 million streams and 13,900 in sales, making it Laroi's first leader on the chart and Bieber's second after "Peaches". It later topped the Billboard Global Excl. U.S. on the chart dated 21 August 2021, dethroning "Bad Habits". The song was the longest-reigning number one on the Global 200, at the time and the first to lead it for double-digits, spending a total of eleven weeks at the top of the chart. On 4 November 2021, the song reportedly reached one billion streams on Spotify, becoming the fastest to do so in 118 days and surpassing the previous record held by Sheeran with "Shape of You" in 153 days. "Stay" was the most-streamed song globally on Apple Music in 2022.

== Music video and lyric video ==
=== Music video ===
The official music video for "Stay", directed by Colin Tilley, premiered alongside the song's release at midnight on 9 July 2021. It depicts Laroi and Bieber dancing in a city where time has stopped flowing and all other people are frozen still. Elisa Talbot served as the video's cinematographer while Jack Winter produced it, with Jamee Ranta and Tilley as executive producers. The music video has more than one billion views on YouTube as of 6 April 2025. It is Laroi's first and Bieber's 12th video to reach this milestone.

=== Lyric video ===
The official lyric video for "Stay" was released on 15 July 2021.

== Live performances ==
"Stay" received its first live performance on 9 July 2021, the same day as its release, where Laroi joined Bieber during his set at the Encore Theater at the Wynn in Las Vegas. A live performance video of the song from the show was uploaded on Laroi's YouTube channel on 12 July. The two performed it on 10 July at the grand opening of the hotel's new supper club, Delilah, towards the end of Bieber's eight-song set. On 5 September, Bieber also brought Laroi out to perform "Stay" during his set of the Made In America Festival in Philadelphia, Pennsylvania, in which he was one of the headliners of alongside American rapper Lil Baby. Exactly one week later, Bieber invited Laroi to perform the song at the 2021 MTV Video Music Awards from the Barclays Center in Brooklyn, New York, for his two-song set that also included his performance of his single, "Ghost". Laroi appeared on a dimly lit stage to perform a stripped-back version of the song during Jimmy Kimmel Live! on 29 October, where he was accompanied by a pianist. On 24 November, Laroi closed out the 2021 ARIA Music Awards with a punk-inspired rendition of the song backed by a full band in front of a small club audience. On 11 December, Bieber gave his first solo performance of the song during the Capital FM's Jingle Ball festival at the O2 Arena in London, England, in which he sang his verse of the song and a portion of the chorus before it without the song playing at all. During his headlining Coachella 2026 set, Bieber was joined by Laroi to perform "Stay".

== Credits and personnel ==
Credits adapted from Tidal.

- The Kid Laroi – vocals, songwriting
- Justin Bieber – vocals, songwriting
- Cashmere Cat – production, songwriting, keyboards, programming
- Charlie Puth – production, songwriting, keyboards, programming
- Omer Fedi – production, songwriting, bass, guitar, keyboards, programming
- Blake Slatkin – production, songwriting, bass, guitar, keyboards, programming
- FnZ
  - Finatik – songwriting
  - Zac – songwriting
- Haan – songwriting
- Heidi Wang – engineering
- John Hanes – engineering
- Şerban Ghenea – mixing
- Chris Athens – mastering
- Elijah Marrett-Hitch – recording
- Josh Gudwin – recording, vocal production

== Charts ==
=== Weekly charts ===
Weekly chart performance for "Stay"
Chart (2021–2026)	Peak position
Argentina Hot 100 (Billboard)	35
Australia (ARIA)	1
Australia Hip Hop/R&B (ARIA)	1
Austria (Ö3 Austria Top 40)	1
Belarus Airplay (TopHit)	28
Belgium (Ultratop 50 Flanders)	1
Belgium (Ultratop 50 Wallonia)	1
Bolivia Airplay (Monitor Latino)	7
Brazil Airplay (Top 100 Brasil)	3
Bulgaria Airplay (PROPHON)	3
Canada Hot 100 (Billboard)	1
Canada AC (Billboard)	7
Canada CHR/Top 40 (Billboard)	1
Canada Hot AC (Billboard)	1
CIS Airplay (TopHit)	2
Colombia Streaming (Promúsica)	16
Costa Rica (FONOTICA)	9
Croatia International Airplay (Top lista)	6
Czech Republic Airplay (ČNS IFPI)	3
Czech Republic Singles Digital (ČNS IFPI)	1
Denmark (Tracklisten)	1
Dominican Republic Streaming (SODINPRO)	20
Ecuador Airplay (Monitor Latino)	18
El Salvador Airplay (ASAP EGC)	1
Finland (Suomen virallinen lista)	1
France (SNEP)	3
Germany (GfK)	1
Global 200 (Billboard)	1
Greece International (IFPI)	2
Honduras Airplay (Monitor Latino)	7
Hong Kong (Billboard)	14
Hungary (Rádiós Top 40)	1
Hungary (Single Top 40)	3
Hungary (Stream Top 40)	1
Iceland (Tónlistinn)	1
India International (IMI)	1
Indonesia (Billboard)	18
Ireland (IRMA)	2
Israel International Airplay (Media Forest)	1
Italy (FIMI)	3
Japan Hot 100 (Billboard)	10
Japan Combined Singles (Oricon)	11
Kazakhstan Airplay (TopHit)	93
Lebanon (Lebanese Top 20)	2
Lithuania (AGATA)	2
Luxembourg (Billboard)	10
Malaysia (RIM)	1
Mexico Streaming (AMPROFON)	8
Netherlands (Dutch Top 40)	1
Netherlands (Single Top 100)	1
New Zealand (Recorded Music NZ)	1
Norway (VG-lista)	1
Panama (PRODUCE)	5
Peru (UNIMPRO)	7
Philippines (Billboard)	15
Philippines Hot 100 (Billboard Philippines)	89
Poland Airplay (ZPAV)	1
Portugal (AFP)	3
Portugal Airplay (AFP)	2
Puerto Rico (Monitor Latino)	15
Romania (UPFR)	2
Romania Airplay (TopHit)	57
Russia Airplay (TopHit)	2
San Marino Airplay (SMRTV Top 50)	1
Singapore (RIAS)	1
Slovakia Airplay (ČNS IFPI)	1
Slovakia Singles Digital (ČNS IFPI)	1
South Africa Streaming (TOSAC)	2
South Korea (Gaon)	1
Spain (Promusicae)	11
Sweden (Sverigetopplistan)	1
Switzerland (Schweizer Hitparade)	2
Taiwan (Billboard)	3
Ukraine Airplay (TopHit)	28
UK Singles (Official Charts)	2
US Billboard Hot 100	1
US Adult Contemporary (Billboard)	2
US Adult Pop Airplay (Billboard)	1
US Dance Airplay (Billboard)	2
US Pop Airplay (Billboard)	1
US Rhythmic Airplay (Billboard)	3
US Rolling Stone Top 100	1
Uruguay (Monitor Latino)	14
Venezuela Airplay (Monitor Latino)	14
Vietnam (Vietnam Hot 100)	9

=== Monthly charts ===
Monthly chart performance for "Stay"
Chart (2021–2023)	Peak position
Belarus Airplay (TopHit)	32
CIS Airplay (TopHit)	2
Romania Airplay (TopHit)	59
Russia Airplay (TopHit)	3
South Korea (Gaon)	1
Ukraine Airplay (TopHit)	75

=== Year-end charts ===
2021 year-end chart performance for "Stay"
Chart (2021)	Position
Australia (ARIA)	2
Australia Hip Hop/R&B (ARIA)	1
Austria (Ö3 Austria Top 40)	3
Belgium (Ultratop Flanders)	7
Belgium (Ultratop Wallonia)	6
Brazil (Pro-Música Brasil)	119
Canada (Canadian Hot 100)	10
CIS Airplay (TopHit)	23
Croatia International Airplay (Top lista)	58
Denmark (Tracklisten)	5
Finland (Suomen virallinen lista)	9
France (SNEP)	17
Germany (Official German Charts)	6
Global 200 (Billboard)	8
Hungary (Rádiós Top 40)	60
Hungary (Single Top 40)	31
Hungary (Stream Top 40)	8
Iceland (Tónlistinn)	6
India International Streaming (IMI)	2
Ireland (IRMA)	7
Italy (FIMI)	24
Japan (Japan Hot 100)	76
Mexico Streaming (AMPROFON)	2
Netherlands (Dutch Top 40)	2
Netherlands (Single Top 100)	2
New Zealand (Recorded Music NZ)	8
Norway (VG-lista)	3
Poland (ZPAV)	26
Portugal (AFP)	14
Russia Airplay (TopHit)	33
South Korea (Gaon)	21
Spain (PROMUSICAE)	61
Sweden (Sverigetopplistan)	7
Switzerland (Schweizer Hitparade)	12
UK Singles (OCC)	7
US Billboard Hot 100	12
US Adult Contemporary (Billboard)	36
US Adult Top 40 (Billboard)	20
US Dance/Mix Show Airplay (Billboard)	23
US Mainstream Top 40 (Billboard)	12
US Rhythmic (Billboard)	42

2022 year-end chart performance for "Stay"
Chart (2022)	Position
Australia (ARIA)	3
Australia Hip Hop/R&B (ARIA)	1
Austria (Ö3 Austria Top 40)	15
Belgium (Ultratop 50 Flanders)	21
Brazil Streaming (Pro-Música Brasil)	123
Canada (Canadian Hot 100)	5
CIS Airplay (TopHit)	14
Croatia International Airplay (Top lista)	43
Denmark (Tracklisten)	17
France (SNEP)	49
Germany (Official German Charts)	16
Global 200 (Billboard)	3
Hungary (Rádiós Top 40)	98
Hungary (Stream Top 40)	43
Iceland (Tónlistinn)	8
India International Streaming (IMI)	3
Italy (FIMI)	66
Japan (Japan Hot 100)	47
Lithuania (AGATA)	24
Netherlands (Single Top 100)	69
New Zealand (Recorded Music NZ)	10
Norway (VG-lista)	33
Poland (ZPAV)	68
Portugal (AFP)	19
Russia Airplay (TopHit)	17
South Korea (Circle)	14
Sweden (Sverigetopplistan)	30
Switzerland (Schweizer Hitparade)	19
Ukraine Airplay (TopHit)	178
UK Singles (OCC)	30
US Billboard Hot 100	3
US Adult Contemporary (Billboard)	5
US Adult Top 40 (Billboard)	1
US Dance/Mix Show Airplay (Billboard)	38
US Mainstream Top 40 (Billboard)	4
US Rhythmic (Billboard)	45
Vietnam (Vietnam Hot 100)	31

2023 year-end chart performance for "Stay"
Chart (2023)	Position
Australia (ARIA)	36
Australia Hip Hop/R&B (ARIA)	7
Belarus Airplay (TopHit)	90
CIS Airplay (TopHit)	77
France (SNEP)	194
Global 200 (Billboard)	37
India International Streaming (IMI)	10
Poland (Polish Airplay Top 100)	78
Portugal (AFP)	175
Romania Airplay (TopHit)	167
Russia Airplay (TopHit)	135
South Korea (Circle)	33

2024 year-end chart performance for "Stay"
Chart (2024)	Position
Australia (ARIA)	96
Australia Hip Hop/R&B (ARIA)	15
Belarus Airplay (TopHit)	104
CIS Airplay (TopHit)	146
Global 200 (Billboard)	82
South Korea (Circle)	106

2025 year-end chart performance for "Stay"
Chart (2025)	Position
Australia Hip Hop/R&B (ARIA)	37
Belarus Airplay (TopHit)	123
CIS Airplay (TopHit)	163
South Korea (Circle)	141

== Certifications ==
Certifications for "Stay"
Region	Certification	Certified units/sales
Australia (ARIA)	17× Platinum	1,190,000^{‡}
Austria (IFPI Austria)	2× Platinum	60,000^{‡}
Belgium (BRMA)	2× Platinum	80,000^{‡}
Brazil (Pro-Música Brasil)	3× Diamond	480,000^{‡}
Canada (Music Canada)	Diamond	800,000^{‡}
Denmark (IFPI Danmark)	4× Platinum	360,000^{‡}
France (SNEP)	Diamond	333,333^{‡}
Germany (BVMI)	2× Platinum	1,200,000^{‡}
Italy (FIMI)	4× Platinum	400,000^{‡}
Mexico (AMPROFON)	Diamond	700,000^{‡}
New Zealand (RMNZ)	7× Platinum	210,000^{‡}
Norway (IFPI Norway)	2× Platinum	120,000^{‡}
Poland (ZPAV)	4× Platinum	200,000^{‡}
Portugal (AFP)	6× Platinum	150,000^{‡}
Spain (Promusicae)	4× Platinum	240,000^{‡}
Switzerland (IFPI Switzerland)	3× Platinum	60,000^{‡}
United Kingdom (BPI)	4× Platinum	2,400,000^{‡}
United States (RIAA)	11× Platinum	11,000,000^{‡}
Streaming
Greece (IFPI Greece)	3× Platinum	6,000,000^{†}
Japan (RIAJ)	3× Platinum	300,000,000^{†}
South Korea (KMCA)	2× Platinum	200,000,000^{†}
Sweden (GLF)	5× Platinum	40,000,000^{†}
^{‡} Sales+streaming figures based on certification alone.^{†} Streaming-only figures based on certification alone.

== Release history ==
Release dates and formats for "Stay"
Region	Date	Format(s)	Label	Ref.
Various	9 July 2021	Digital download; streaming	Columbia	
Italy	9 July 2021	Radio airplay	Sony	
United States	20 July 2021	Contemporary hit radio	Columbia	
United States	10 August 2021	Rhythmic contemporary radio	Columbia	

== See also ==
- List of Billboard Hot 100 number ones of 2021
- List of highest-certified singles in Australia
- List of number-one songs of 2021 (Malaysia)
- List of number-one songs of 2021 (Singapore)
