= List of number-one club tracks of 2020 (Australia) =

ARIA Charts number-one club tracks of 2020 < 2019 2021 >

Other Australian number-one charts of 2020
- albums
- singles
- urban singles
- dance singles
- digital tracks
- streaming tracks

Top Australian singles and albums of 2020
- Triple J Hottest 100
- top 25 singles
- top 25 albums

This is the list of number-one tracks on the ARIA Club Chart in 2020, and is compiled by the Australian Recording Industry Association (ARIA) from weekly DJ reports.

== 2020 ==
Date		Song	Artist(s)	Reference
January	6	"So in Love with You"	Andy Murphy and Ed Colman featuring Zak Love	
January	13	"On Fire"	Colour Castle and Supermini	
January	20	"On Fire"	Colour Castle and Supermini	
January	27	"Don't Start Now"	Dua Lipa	
February	3	"Gimme! Gimme! Gimme!"	Sgt Slick	
February	10	"Gimme! Gimme! Gimme!"	Sgt Slick	
February	17	"How to Love Me"	Kid Crème and Jolyon Petch	
February	24	"How to Love Me"	Kid Crème and Jolyon Petch	
March	2	"Gimme! Gimme! Gimme!"	Sgt Slick	
March	9	"Gimme! Gimme! Gimme!"	Sgt Slick	
March	16	"Gimme! Gimme! Gimme!"	Sgt Slick	
March	23	"Gimme! Gimme! Gimme!"	Sgt Slick	
March	30	"Ticket 2 Ride"	Syke 'n' Sugarstarr	
April	6	"Mind Funktion"	Kyro	
April	13	"Freaks"	Fisher	
April	20	"D.A.D. (Dance all Day)"	Wongo	
April	27	"Drop the Pressure"	Claptone & Mylo	
May	4	"Isolation"	Peking Duk & Benson	
May	11	"Drop the Pressure"	Claptone & Mylo	
May	18	"Energy"	Stace Cadet & KLP	
May	25	"Energy"	Stace Cadet & KLP	
June	1	"Energy"	Stace Cadet & KLP	
June	8	"Energy"	Stace Cadet & KLP	
June	15	"Drop the Pressure"	Claptone & Mylo	
June	22	"MVINLINE"	Boys Noize	
June	29	"MVINLINE"	Boys Noize	
July	6	"MVINLINE"	Boys Noize	
July	13	"A.C. (Needs No Sleep / Tise Jones / Skurt mix)"	Krude	
July	20	"Talk to Me"	Colour Castle	
July	27	"Talk to Me"	Colour Castle	
August	3	"Moving Blind"	Sonny Fodera & Dom Dolla	
August	10	"Moving Blind"	Sonny Fodera & Dom Dolla	
August	17	"Energy"	Stace Cadet & KLP	
August	24	"Live Without Your Love"	Love Regenerator and Steve Lacy	
August	31	"Sunny"	L'Tric and Chloe Wilson	
September	7	"Sunny"	L'Tric and Chloe Wilson	
September	14	"Mile High Club"	Needs No Sleep featuring B4ng B4ng	
September	21	"Just A Little"	John Course	
September	28	"Just A Little"	John Course	
October	5	"Show Me Love 2020"	Robin S.	
October	12	"Show Me Love 2020"	Robin S.	
October	19	"Show Me Love 2020"	Robin S.	
October	26	"Lemonade (Dave Winnel Club mix)"	Friendless	
November	2	"Secrets (extended mix)"	The Journey	
November	9	"Secrets (extended mix)"	The Journey	
November	16	"Secrets (extended mix)"	The Journey	
November	23	"The Night The Lights Went Out"	Sgt Slick	
November	30	"Danger Zone"	Wongo	
December	7	"Perfect"	Princess Superstar vs. Supermini & Frankie Romano	
December	14	"Perfect"	Princess Superstar vs. Supermini & Frankie Romano	
December	21	"Perfect"	Princess Superstar vs. Supermini & Frankie Romano	
December	28	"Perfect"	Princess Superstar vs. Supermini & Frankie Romano	

== Number-one artists ==
Position	Artist	Weeks at No. 1
1	Sgt Slick	7
2	Stace Cadet	5
2	KLP	5
2	Supermini	5
3	Colour Castle	4
3	Frankie Romano	4
3	Princess Superstar	4
3	Supermini	4
4	Boyz Noize	3
4	Frankie Romano	3
4	Claptone	3
4	Mylo	3
4	Robin S.	3
4	The Journey	3
5	Jolyon Petch	2
5	Sonny Federa	2
5	Chloe Wilson	2
5	Dom Dolla	2
5	John Course	2
5	Kid Crème	2
5	L'Tric	2
6	Andy Murphy	1
6	Ed Colman	1
6	Zak Love	1
6	Dua Lipa	1
6	Syke 'n' Sugarstarr	1
6	Kyro	1
6	Peking Duk	1
6	Benson	1
6	Wongo	1
6	Krude	1
6	Love Regenerator	1
6	Steve Lacy	1
6	Fisher	1
6	Needs No Sleep	1
6	Friendless	1
6	Wongo	1

== See also ==
- ARIA Charts
- 2020 in music
