= List of number-one digital tracks of 2020 (Australia) =

ARIA Charts number-one digital tracks of 2020 < 2019 2021 >

Other Australian number-one charts of 2020
- albums
- singles
- urban singles
- dance singles
- club tracks
- streaming tracks

Top Australian singles and albums of 2020
- Triple J Hottest 100
- top 25 singles
- top 25 albums

The ARIA Digital Track Chart is a chart that ranks the best-performing digital tracks singles of Australia. It is published by Australian Recording Industry Association (ARIA), an organisation who collect music data for the weekly ARIA Charts. To be eligible to appear on the chart, the recording must be a single not an EP and only paid downloads counted from downloadable outlets.

Issue date	Song	Artist(s)	Reference
6 January	"Dance Monkey"	Tones and I	
13 January	"Let It Rain"	Delta Goodrem	
20 January	"Dance Monkey"	Tones and I	
27 January	"Blinding Lights"	The Weeknd	
3 February	"Blinding Lights"	The Weeknd	
10 February	"Blinding Lights"	The Weeknd	
17 February	"Blinding Lights"	The Weeknd	
28 September	"One Too Many"	Keith Urban and Pink	
5 October	"One Too Many"	Keith Urban and Pink	

== Number-one artists ==
Position	Artist	Weeks at No. 1
1	The Weeknd	4
2	Keith Urban	2
2	Pink	2
3	Tones and I	2
4	Delta Goodrem	1

== See also ==
- 2020 in music
- ARIA Charts
- List of number-one singles of 2020 (Australia)
