= List of Top 25 singles for 2020 in Australia =

Top 25 singles of 2020 < 2019 2021 >

Other Australian top charts for 2020
- top 25 albums
- Triple J Hottest 100

Australian number-one charts of 2020
- albums
- singles
- urban singles
- dance singles
- club tracks
- digital tracks
- streaming tracks

The following lists the top 25 singles of 2020 in Australia from the Australian Recording Industry Association (ARIA) end-of-year singles chart.

"Blinding Lights" by The Weeknd was the top selling single of 2020 in Australia, spending eleven weeks at No. 1 and being certified six times platinum. "Dance Monkey" by Tones and I, which was the previous year's highest-selling Australian song, held that title for the second consecutive year, being certified thirteen times platinum and spending a further 3 weeks atop the chart, for an overall total of 24 weeks.

#	Title	Artist	Highest pos. reached
1	"Blinding Lights"	The Weeknd	1
2	"Roses"	Saint Jhn	1
3	"Don't Start Now"	Dua Lipa	2
4	"Dance Monkey"	Tones and I	1
5	"Rockstar"	DaBaby featuring Roddy Ricch	1
6	"Watermelon Sugar"	Harry Styles	5
7	"Circles"	Post Malone	2
8	"Before You Go"	Lewis Capaldi	7
9	"Intentions"	Justin Bieber featuring Quavo	2
10	"Say So"	Doja Cat	4
11	"Adore You"	Harry Styles	7
12	"Savage Love (Laxed – Siren Beat)"	Jawsh 685 and Jason Derulo	1
13	"Someone You Loved"	Lewis Capaldi	4
14	"The Box"	Roddy Ricch	4
15	"You Should Be Sad"	Halsey	4
16	"Breaking Me"	Topic and A7S	4
17	"Mood"	24kGoldn featuring Iann Dior	1
18	"Ride It"	Regard	3
19	"WAP"	Cardi B featuring Megan Thee Stallion	1
20	"Death Bed"	Powfu featuring Beabadoobee	5
21	"Memories"	Maroon 5	2
22	"Bad Guy"	Billie Eilish	1
23	"Head & Heart"	Joel Corry featuring MNEK	2
24	"Never Seen the Rain"	Tones and I	7
25	"Whats Poppin"	Jack Harlow	8

== See also ==
- List of number-one singles of 2020 (Australia)
- List of top 10 singles in 2020 (Australia)
- List of Top 25 albums for 2020 in Australia
- 2020 in music
- ARIA Charts
- List of Australian chart achievements and milestones
