= List of number-one singles of 2020 (Australia) =

ARIA Charts number-one singles of 2020 < 2019 2021 >

Other Australian number-one charts of 2020
- albums
- urban singles
- dance singles
- club tracks
- digital tracks
- streaming tracks

Top Australian singles and albums of 2020
- Triple J Hottest 100
- top 25 singles
- top 25 albums

The ARIA Singles Chart ranks the best-performing singles in Australia. Its data, published by the Australian Recording Industry Association, is based collectively on the weekly physical and digital sales and streams of singles. In 2020, eleven songs reached number one, with "Dance Monkey" by Tones and I returning to the top on the first chart of the year after spending 21 weeks atop the chart in 2019. Nine artists, The Weeknd, Saint Jhn, DaBaby, Roddy Ricch, Jawsh 685, Cardi B, Megan Thee Stallion, 24kGoldn and Iann Dior, reached the top for the first time.

== Chart history ==
Key
†	Indicates best-performing single of 2020

Issue date	Song	Artist(s)	Ref.
6 January	"Dance Monkey"	Tones and I	
13 January	"Dance Monkey"	Tones and I	
20 January	"Dance Monkey"	Tones and I	
27 January	"Blinding Lights" †	The Weeknd	
3 February	"Blinding Lights" †	The Weeknd	
10 February	"Blinding Lights" †	The Weeknd	
17 February	"Blinding Lights" †	The Weeknd	
24 February	"Blinding Lights" †	The Weeknd	
2 March	"Blinding Lights" †	The Weeknd	
9 March	"Blinding Lights" †	The Weeknd	
16 March	"Blinding Lights" †	The Weeknd	
23 March	"Blinding Lights" †	The Weeknd	
30 March	"Blinding Lights" †	The Weeknd	
6 April	"Roses"	Saint Jhn	
13 April	"Roses"	Saint Jhn	
20 April	"Blinding Lights" †	The Weeknd	
27 April	"Roses"	Saint Jhn	
4 May	"Roses"	Saint Jhn	
11 May	"Roses"	Saint Jhn	
18 May	"Roses"	Saint Jhn	
25 May	"Rockstar"	DaBaby featuring Roddy Ricch	
1 June	"Rockstar"	DaBaby featuring Roddy Ricch	
8 June	"Rockstar"	DaBaby featuring Roddy Ricch	
15 June	"Rockstar"	DaBaby featuring Roddy Ricch	
22 June	"Rockstar"	DaBaby featuring Roddy Ricch	
29 June	"Rockstar"	DaBaby featuring Roddy Ricch	
6 July	"Savage Love (Laxed – Siren Beat)"	Jawsh 685 and Jason Derulo	
13 July	"Savage Love (Laxed – Siren Beat)"	Jawsh 685 and Jason Derulo	
20 July	"Savage Love (Laxed – Siren Beat)"	Jawsh 685 and Jason Derulo	
27 July	"Savage Love (Laxed – Siren Beat)"	Jawsh 685 and Jason Derulo	
3 August	"Cardigan"	Taylor Swift	
10 August	"Savage Love (Laxed – Siren Beat)"	Jawsh 685 and Jason Derulo	
17 August	"Savage Love (Laxed – Siren Beat)"	Jawsh 685 and Jason Derulo	
24 August	"WAP"	Cardi B featuring Megan Thee Stallion	
31 August	"WAP"	Cardi B featuring Megan Thee Stallion	
7 September	"WAP"	Cardi B featuring Megan Thee Stallion	
14 September	"WAP"	Cardi B featuring Megan Thee Stallion	
21 September	"WAP"	Cardi B featuring Megan Thee Stallion	
28 September	"WAP"	Cardi B featuring Megan Thee Stallion	
5 October	"Mood"	24kGoldn featuring Iann Dior	
12 October	"Mood"	24kGoldn featuring Iann Dior	
19 October	"Mood"	24kGoldn featuring Iann Dior	
26 October	"Mood"	24kGoldn featuring Iann Dior	
2 November	"Positions"	Ariana Grande	
9 November	"Positions"	Ariana Grande	
16 November	"Mood"	24kGoldn featuring Iann Dior	
23 November	"Mood"	24kGoldn featuring Iann Dior	
30 November	"Mood"	24kGoldn featuring Iann Dior	
7 December	"Mood"	24kGoldn featuring Iann Dior	
14 December	"Mood"	24kGoldn featuring Iann Dior	
21 December	"Willow"	Taylor Swift	
28 December	"All I Want for Christmas Is You"	Mariah Carey	

== Number-one artists ==
List of number-one artists, with total weeks spent at No. 1 shown
Position	Artist	Weeks at No. 1
1	The Weeknd	11
2	24kGoldn	9
2	Iann Dior	9
3	Saint Jhn	6
3	DaBaby	6
3	Roddy Ricch	6
3	Jawsh 685	6
3	Jason Derulo	6
3	Cardi B	6
3	Megan Thee Stallion	6
4	Tones and I	3
5	Ariana Grande	2
5	Taylor Swift	2
6	Mariah Carey	1

== See also ==
- 2020 in music
- List of number-one albums of 2020 (Australia)
- List of top 10 singles in 2020 (Australia)
