= List of number-one dance singles of 2020 (Australia) =

ARIA Charts number-one dance singles of 2020 < 2019 2021 >

Other Australian number-one charts of 2020
- albums
- singles
- urban singles
- club tracks
- digital tracks
- streaming tracks

Top Australian singles and albums of 2020
- Triple J Hottest 100
- top 25 singles
- top 25 albums

The ARIA Dance Chart is a chart that ranks the best-performing dance singles of Australia. It is published by Australian Recording Industry Association (ARIA), an organisation who collect music data for the weekly ARIA Charts. To be eligible to appear on the chart, the recording must be a single, and be "predominantly of a dance nature, or with a featured track of a dance nature, or included in the ARIA Club Chart or a comparable overseas chart".

== Chart history ==
Date	Song	Artist(s)	Ref.
6 January	"Ride It"	Regard	
13 January	"Ride It"	Regard	
20 January	"Ride It"	Regard	
27 January	"Ride It"	Regard	
3 February	"Rushing Back"	Flume featuring Vera Blue	
10 February	"Ride It"	Regard	
17 February	"Ride It"	Regard	
24 February	"Ride It"	Regard	
2 March	"Ride It"	Regard	
9 March	"Ride It"	Regard	
16 March	"Roses (Imanbek remix)"	Saint Jhn & Imanbek	
23 March	"Roses (Imanbek remix)"	Saint Jhn & Imanbek	
30 March	"Roses (Imanbek remix)"	Saint Jhn & Imanbek	
6 April	"Roses (Imanbek remix)"	Saint Jhn & Imanbek	
13 April	"Roses (Imanbek remix)"	Saint Jhn & Imanbek	
20 April	"Roses (Imanbek remix)"	Saint Jhn & Imanbek	
27 April	"Roses (Imanbek remix)"	Saint Jhn & Imanbek	
4 May	"Roses (Imanbek remix)"	Saint Jhn & Imanbek	
11 May	"Roses (Imanbek remix)"	Saint Jhn & Imanbek	
18 May	"Roses (Imanbek remix)"	Saint Jhn & Imanbek	
25 May	"Roses (Imanbek remix)"	Saint Jhn & Imanbek	
1 June	"Roses (Imanbek remix)"	Saint Jhn & Imanbek	
8 June	"Roses (Imanbek remix)"	Saint Jhn & Imanbek	
15 June	"Roses (Imanbek remix)"	Saint Jhn & Imanbek	
22 June	"Roses (Imanbek remix)"	Saint Jhn & Imanbek	
29 June	"Roses (Imanbek remix)"	Saint Jhn & Imanbek	
6 July	"Roses (Imanbek remix)"	Saint Jhn & Imanbek	
13 July	"Roses (Imanbek remix)"	Saint Jhn & Imanbek	
20 July	"Roses (Imanbek remix)"	Saint Jhn & Imanbek	
27 July	"Roses (Imanbek remix)"	Saint Jhn & Imanbek	
3 August	"Roses (Imanbek remix)"	Saint Jhn & Imanbek	
10 August	"Roses (Imanbek remix)"	Saint Jhn & Imanbek	
17 August	"Roses (Imanbek remix)"	Saint Jhn & Imanbek	
24 August	"Roses (Imanbek remix)"	Saint Jhn & Imanbek	
31 August	"Head & Heart"	Joel Corry featuring MNEK	
7 September	"Head & Heart"	Joel Corry featuring MNEK	
14 September	"Head & Heart"	Joel Corry featuring MNEK	
21 September	"Head & Heart"	Joel Corry featuring MNEK	
28 September	"Head & Heart"	Joel Corry featuring MNEK	
5 October	"Head & Heart"	Joel Corry featuring MNEK	
12 October	"Head & Heart"	Joel Corry featuring MNEK	
19 October	"Head & Heart"	Joel Corry featuring MNEK	
26 October	"Head & Heart"	Joel Corry featuring MNEK	
2 November	"Head & Heart"	Joel Corry featuring MNEK	
9 November	"Head & Heart"	Joel Corry featuring MNEK	
16 November	"Head & Heart"	Joel Corry featuring MNEK	
23 November	"Head & Heart"	Joel Corry featuring MNEK	
30 November	"Head & Heart"	Joel Corry featuring MNEK	
7 December	"Head & Heart"	Joel Corry featuring MNEK	
14 December	"Head & Heart"	Joel Corry featuring MNEK	
21 December	"Head & Heart"	Joel Corry featuring MNEK	
28 December	"Head & Heart"	Joel Corry featuring MNEK	

== Number-one artists ==
Position	Artist	Weeks at No. 1
1	Saint Jhn	25
1	Imanbek (as remixer)	25
2	Joel Corry	18
2	MNEK (as featuring)	18
3	Regard	9
4	Flume	1
4	Vera Blue (as featuring)	1

== See also ==
- ARIA Charts
- 2020 in music
