= List of number-one urban singles of 2020 (Australia) =

ARIA Charts number-one urban singles of 2020 < 2019 2021 >

Other Australian number-one charts of 2020
- albums
- singles
- dance singles
- club tracks
- digital tracks
- streaming tracks

Top Australian singles and albums of 2020
- Triple J Hottest 100
- top 25 singles
- top 25 albums

The ARIA Urban Chart is a chart that ranks the best-performing Urban tracks singles of Australia. It is published by the Australian Recording Industry Association (ARIA), an organisation who collect music data for the weekly ARIA Charts. To be eligible to appear on the chart, the recording must be a single of a predominantly urban nature.

== Chart history ==
Issue date	Song	Artist(s)	Reference
6 January	"Roxanne"	Arizona Zervas	
13 January	"Blinding Lights"	The Weeknd	
20 January	"Blinding Lights"	The Weeknd	
27 January	"Blinding Lights"	The Weeknd	
3 February	"Blinding Lights"	The Weeknd	
10 February	"Blinding Lights"	The Weeknd	
17 February	"Blinding Lights"	The Weeknd	
24 February	"Blinding Lights"	The Weeknd	
2 March	"Blinding Lights"	The Weeknd	
9 March	"Blinding Lights"	The Weeknd	
16 March	"Blinding Lights"	The Weeknd	
23 March	"Blinding Lights"	The Weeknd	
30 March	"Blinding Lights"	The Weeknd	
6 April	"Blinding Lights"	The Weeknd	
13 April	"Blinding Lights"	The Weeknd	
20 April	"Blinding Lights"	The Weeknd	
27 April	"Blinding Lights"	The Weeknd	
4 May	"Blinding Lights"	The Weeknd	
11 May	"Blinding Lights"	The Weeknd	
18 May	"Blinding Lights"	The Weeknd	
25 May	"Rockstar"	DaBaby featuring Roddy Ricch	
1 June	"Rockstar"	DaBaby featuring Roddy Ricch	
8 June	"Rockstar"	DaBaby featuring Roddy Ricch	
15 June	"Rockstar"	DaBaby featuring Roddy Ricch	
22 June	"Rockstar"	DaBaby featuring Roddy Ricch	
29 June	"Rockstar"	DaBaby featuring Roddy Ricch	
6 July	"Savage Love"	Jason Derulo and Jawsh 685	
13 July	"Savage Love"	Jason Derulo and Jawsh 685	
20 July	"Savage Love"	Jason Derulo and Jawsh 685	
27 July	"Savage Love"	Jason Derulo and Jawsh 685	
3 August	"Savage Love"	Jason Derulo and Jawsh 685	
10 August	"Savage Love"	Jason Derulo and Jawsh 685	
17 August	"Savage Love"	Jason Derulo and Jawsh 685	
24 August	"WAP"	Cardi B and Megan Thee Stallion	
31 August	"WAP"	Cardi B and Megan Thee Stallion	
7 September	"WAP"	Cardi B and Megan Thee Stallion	
14 September	"WAP"	Cardi B and Megan Thee Stallion	
21 September	"WAP"	Cardi B and Megan Thee Stallion	
28 September	"WAP"	Cardi B and Megan Thee Stallion	
5 October	"Mood"	24kGoldn and Iann Dior	
12 October	"Mood"	24kGoldn and Iann Dior	
19 October	"Mood"	24kGoldn and Iann Dior	
26 October	"Mood"	24kGoldn and Iann Dior	
2 November	"Mood"	24kGoldn and Iann Dior	
9 November	"Mood"	24kGoldn and Iann Dior	
16 November	"Mood"	24kGoldn and Iann Dior	
23 November	"Mood"	24kGoldn and Iann Dior	
30 November	"Mood"	24kGoldn and Iann Dior	
7 December	"Mood"	24kGoldn and Iann Dior	
14 December	"Mood"	24kGoldn and Iann Dior	
21 December	"Mood"	24kGoldn and Iann Dior	
28 December	"Mood"	24kGoldn and Iann Dior	

== See also ==
- 2020 in music
- List of number-one singles of 2020 (Australia)
