= List of number-one streaming tracks of 2020 (Australia) =

ARIA Charts number-one streaming tracks of 2020 < 2019 2021 >

Other Australian number-one charts of 2020
- albums
- singles
- urban singles
- dance singles
- club tracks
- digital tracks

Top Australian singles and albums of 2020
- Triple J Hottest 100
- top 25 singles
- top 25 albums

The ARIA Streaming Chart ranks the best-performing streaming tracks of Australia. It is published by Australian Recording Industry Association (ARIA), an organisation who collects music data for the weekly ARIA Charts.

== Chart history ==
Key
†	Indicates number-one streaming single of 2020

Issue date	Song	Artist(s)	Reference
6 January	"Dance Monkey"	Tones and I	
13 January	"Dance Monkey"	Tones and I	
20 January	"Yummy"	Justin Bieber	
27 January	"The Box"	Roddy Ricch	
3 February	"The Box"	Roddy Ricch	
10 February	"The Box"	Roddy Ricch	
28 September	"WAP"	Megan Thee Stallion and Cardi B	
5 October	"Mood"	24kGoldn featuring Iann Dior	

== See also ==
- 2020 in music
- ARIA Charts
- List of number-one singles of 2020 (Australia)
