= List of number-one albums of 2020 (Australia) =

ARIA Charts number-one albums of 2020 < 2019 2021 >

Other Australian number-one charts of 2020
- singles
- urban singles
- dance singles
- club tracks
- digital tracks
- streaming tracks

Top Australian singles and albums of 2020
- Triple J Hottest 100
- top 25 singles
- top 25 albums

The ARIA Albums Chart ranks the best-performing albums and extended plays (EPs) in Australia. Its data, published by the Australian Recording Industry Association, is based collectively on the weekly physical and digital sales of albums and EPs. In 2020, 39 albums claimed the top spot; Harry Styles' Fine Line returned to number one on the first chart of the year after spending one week atop the chart in December 2019. Eleven acts, Selena Gomez, Lil Uzi Vert, Dua Lipa, The Smith Street Band, The Teskey Brothers, Vika and Linda, Pop Smoke, Lime Cordiale, Juice Wrld, Joji and Adam Lambert, achieved their first number-one album.

== Chart history ==
Key
†	Indicates best-performing album of 2020

List of number-one albums
Date	Album	Artist(s)	Ref.
6 January	Fine Line †	Harry Styles	
13 January	Fine Line †	Harry Styles	
20 January	Rare	Selena Gomez	
27 January	Music to Be Murdered By	Eminem	
3 February	When We All Fall Asleep, Where Do We Go?	Billie Eilish	
10 February	Hurry Up and Wait	Dune Rats	
17 February	Father of All Motherfuckers	Green Day	
24 February	The Slow Rush	Tame Impala	
2 March	Map of the Soul: 7	BTS	
9 March	Map of the Soul: 7	BTS	
16 March	Eternal Atake	Lil Uzi Vert	
23 March	Artists Unite for Fire Fight	Various artists	
30 March	After Hours	The Weeknd	
6 April	Calm	5 Seconds of Summer	
13 April	Everything Is A-OK	Violent Soho	
20 April	Future Nostalgia	Dua Lipa	
27 April	Don't Waste Your Anger	The Smith Street Band	
4 May	Human Design	Birds of Tokyo	
11 May	Dark Lane Demo Tapes	Drake	
18 May	Dark Lane Demo Tapes	Drake	
25 May	Live at the Forum	The Teskey Brothers	
1 June	Notes on a Conditional Form	The 1975	
8 June	Chromatica	Lady Gaga	
15 June	Chromatica	Lady Gaga	
22 June	'Akilotoa (Anthology 1994–2006)	Vika and Linda	
29 June	Music from the Home Front	Various artists	
6 July	Music from the Home Front	Various artists	
13 July	Shoot for the Stars, Aim for the Moon	Pop Smoke	
20 July	14 Steps to a Better You	Lime Cordiale	
27 July	Legends Never Die	Juice Wrld	
3 August	Folklore	Taylor Swift	
10 August	Folklore	Taylor Swift	
17 August	Folklore	Taylor Swift	
24 August	Folklore	Taylor Swift	
31 August	Imploding the Mirage	The Killers	
7 September	S&M2	Metallica and San Francisco Symphony	
14 September	Music from the Home Front	Various artists	
21 September	We Are Chaos	Marilyn Manson	
28 September	The Speed of Now Part 1	Keith Urban	
5 October	Nectar	Joji	
12 October	Live Around the World	Queen + Adam Lambert	
19 October	Hybrid Theory: 20th Anniversary Edition	Linkin Park	
26 October	T.R.U.T.H.	Guy Sebastian	
2 November	Letter to You	Bruce Springsteen	
9 November	The Makarrata Project	Midnight Oil	
16 November	Disco	Kylie Minogue	
23 November	Power Up	AC/DC	
30 November	Power Up	AC/DC	
7 December	Power Up	AC/DC	
14 December	Power Up	AC/DC	
21 December	Evermore	Taylor Swift	
28 December	Evermore	Taylor Swift	

== Number-one artists ==
Position	Artist	Weeks at No. 1
1	Taylor Swift	6
2	AC/DC	4
3	Harry Styles	2
3	BTS	2
3	Drake	2
3	Lady Gaga	2
4	Selena Gomez	1
4	Eminem	1
4	Billie Eilish	1
4	Dune Rats	1
4	Green Day	1
4	Tame Impala	1
4	Lil Uzi Vert	1
4	The Weeknd	1
4	5 Seconds of Summer	1
4	Violent Soho	1
4	Dua Lipa	1
4	The Smith Street Band	1
4	Birds of Tokyo	1
4	The Teskey Brothers	1
4	The 1975	1
4	Vika and Linda	1
4	Pop Smoke	1
4	Lime Cordiale	1
4	Juice Wrld	1
4	The Killers	1
4	Metallica	1
4	San Francisco Symphony	1
4	Marilyn Manson	1
4	Keith Urban	1
4	Joji	1
4	Queen	1
4	Adam Lambert	1
4	Linkin Park	1
4	Guy Sebastian	1
4	Bruce Springsteen	1
4	Midnight Oil	1
4	Kylie Minogue	1

== See also ==
- 2020 in music
- List of number-one singles of 2020 (Australia)
- List of top 10 albums in 2020 (Australia)
