= Without You (The Kid Laroi song) =

2020 single by the Kid Laroi

- Miley Cyrus remix cover

Single by the Kid Laroi

from the album F*ck Love (Savage)
- Released: 18 December 2020
- Genre: Emo rap; folk-pop
- Length: 2:41
- Label: Grade A; Columbia
- Songwriters: Charlton Howard; Blake Slatkin; Omer Fedi; Billy Walsh
- Producers: Blake Slatkin; Omer Fedi

The Kid Laroi singles chronology
"Reminds Me of You" (2020)	"Without You" (2020)	"Stay" (2021)

Miley Cyrus singles chronology
"Angels like You" (2021)	"Without You" (2021)	"Flowers" (2023)

Music videos
- "Without You" on YouTube; "Without You" (Remix) on YouTube

"Without You" (stylised in all caps) is a song by Australian rapper and singer the Kid Laroi from the deluxe "Savage" edition of his debut mixtape F*ck Love (2020). It was released to alternative radio on 18 December 2020 as the fifth overall single from the mixtape.

A remix of "Without You" with American singer Miley Cyrus was released on 30 April 2021. The Kid Laroi had first discussed a forthcoming collaboration with Cyrus in an interview with Billboard on 6 April. The remix itself was first previewed in a TikTok video by Cyrus on 21 April, and the release date was confirmed by both artists on 23 April. It was also Cyrus' first release since signing with Columbia Records in March 2021. It is Cyrus' first remix as a featured artist.

The song debuted on the Billboard Hot 100 at number 63, on the week of 19 December 2020, and peaked at number 23 in May 2021. The remix with Cyrus boosted the popularity of the song later, with the track reaching a new peak of number eight on the Hot 100, becoming Laroi's first top-ten song as lead artist and highest-charting single until the release of "Stay". It is also his first number-one single in Australia.

At the 2021 ARIA Music Awards, the song was nominated for Best Hip Hop Release and Song of the Year.

At the APRA Music Awards of 2022, the song was nominated for Most Performed Australian Work and Most Performed Hip Hop/Rap Work, winning the latter.

== Background ==
The Kid Laroi cited Sia as the inspiration for "Without You", who he listened to a lot. According to Laroi, he was "going through some shit with girls", and while he and Omer Fedi were at his old house, he asked Fedi to play something on his guitar that "Sia would sing over". Fedi then strummed the chords that became "Without You". The song was finished in that one night, consisting for the longest time of "just a bounce of [Laroi's] vocals" and one guitar. Production was added a week before the release of F*ck Love (Savage). Different types of drums were tried out on the track, but the decision was eventually made to exclude them, with Laroi explaining that "it takes away the whole feeling from it".

== Composition and lyrics ==
"Without You" is an acoustic emo rap and folk-pop ballad with a rock edge. Following a basic chord progression, Laroi performs the song with "hoarse, almost grunted vocals" that are "pushed to the upper limits of their range". The spite-filled song details the aftermath of a breakup and how the pain of separation cuts deeper than expected. It sees Laroi lamenting about saying all the wrong things and ending up alone: "You cut out a piecе of me, and now I bleed internally / Left hеre without you / Without you." The remix with Miley Cyrus provides a back-and-forth conversation and stays mostly faithful to the original. Cyrus takes over some of Laroi's lines and contributes a new verse: "Feels like sleeping with a ghost / I called you up to let you know / I really wish that we could've got this right."

== TikTok trend ==
In December 2020, the song started trending on the video-sharing app TikTok, with videos set to the lyrics: "And I can't take it back, so in the past is where we'll leave it/So there you go/Can't make a wife out of a ho", referring to making light of less-than-ideal romantic situations.

== Commercial performance ==
In Australia, "Without You" entered the ARIA Singles Chart at number nine in December 2020, making it the highest debut of the week and Laroi's second appearance in the top ten. It ascended six places to number three a week later, securing Laroi's highest peak on the chart. In May 2021, after spending five weeks at the number two position, the song jumped to number one in its 22nd week on the back of the remix, becoming Laroi's first number-one single. It later broke the record for the most weeks at number one on Australia's radio airplay chart, surpassing the 13-week run of Bernard Fanning's "Wish You Well". "Without You" was certified eight-times platinum by the Australian Recording Industry Association (ARIA).

On the US Billboard Hot 100 chart dated 15 May 2021, "Without You" rose to number eight following the remix's release. It entered the top ten with 12.5 million streams and 8,500 sales in the 30 April–6 May tracking week and drew 43.5 million radio airplay audience impressions in the week ending 9 May. It marked Laroi's second visit to the chart's top ten after debuting and peaking at number ten as a featured artist on Juice Wrld and Marshmello's 2020 collaboration "Hate the Other Side" and his first as a lead artist. Cyrus collected her tenth top-ten hit on the Hot 100, her first since "Malibu" peaked at number ten in 2017. "Without You" also became both artists' first leader on the Hot Rock & Alternative Songs chart. It has since received a quadruple-platinum certification from the Recording Industry Association of America (RIAA).

"Without You" was Laroi's first single to reach the top 40 of the UK Singles Chart, rising 53 places to number 23 in December 2020. It subsequently became his first UK top-ten hit as it climbed to number seven the following month. The song peaked at number two, being blocked from the top spot by Olivia Rodrigo's "Drivers License", and was certified double platinum by the British Phonographic Industry (BPI). "Without You" topped several record charts around Europe, including the Flanders region of Belgium, Finland, Norway, Portugal, and Slovakia. Globally, the song peaked at number ten on the Billboard Global 200 after the release of its remix, becoming Laroi and Cyrus' first top-ten entry on the chart.

== Music video ==
The song's accompanying music video premiered on 16 December 2020, and was directed by Steve Cannon. The video shows Laroi alone in a myriad of vast and expansive locations, including a salt lake and a snow-covered forest before getting "caked in the face" at a party. A video for the remix was also released on 30 April 2021.

== Credits and personnel ==
Credits adapted from Tidal.

- The Kid Laroi – vocals, songwriting
- Blake Slatkin – songwriting, production
- Omer Fedi – songwriting, production
- Billy Walsh – songwriting
- Donn Robb – record engineering
- Jon Castelli – mixing
- Josh Deguzman – assistant engineering
- Connor Hedge – assistant engineering
- Fili Filizzola – assistant engineering
- Hector Vega – assistant engineering
- Dale Becker – mastering

== Charts ==
=== Weekly charts ===
Weekly chart performance for "Without You"
Chart (2020–2022)	Peak position
Australia (ARIA)	1
Australia Hip Hop/R&B (ARIA)	1
Austria (Ö3 Austria Top 40)	5
Belgium (Ultratop 50 Flanders)	1
Belgium (Ultratop 50 Wallonia)	13
Canada Hot 100 (Billboard)	7
Canada CHR/Top 40 (Billboard)	2
Canada Hot AC (Billboard)	7
Croatia (HRT)	23
Czech Republic Airplay (ČNS IFPI)	3
Czech Republic Singles Digital (ČNS IFPI)	8
Denmark (Tracklisten)	2
Finland (Suomen virallinen lista)	1
France (SNEP)	75
Germany (GfK)	13
Global 200 (Billboard)	10
Greece International (IFPI)	15
Hungary (Rádiós Top 40)	3
Hungary (Single Top 40)	8
Hungary (Stream Top 40)	14
Iceland (Tónlistinn)	6
Ireland (IRMA)	3
Israel (Media Forest)	2
Lithuania (AGATA)	13
Netherlands (Dutch Top 40)	2
Netherlands (Single Top 100)	2
New Zealand (Recorded Music NZ)	8
Norway (VG-lista)	1
Poland Airplay (ZPAV)	29
Portugal (AFP)	1
Singapore (RIAS)	20
Slovakia Airplay (ČNS IFPI)	1
Slovakia Singles Digital (ČNS IFPI)	12
South Africa (RISA)	13
Spain (Promusicae) Miley Cyrus Remix	59
Sweden (Sverigetopplistan)	5
Switzerland (Schweizer Hitparade)	10
UK Singles (Official Charts)	2
UK Hip Hop/R&B (Official Charts)	1
US Billboard Hot 100	8
US Adult Contemporary (Billboard)	12
US Adult Pop Airplay (Billboard)	1
US Dance Airplay (Billboard)	14
US Hot R&B/Hip-Hop Songs (Billboard)	44
US Hot Rock & Alternative Songs (Billboard)	1
US Pop Airplay (Billboard)	3
US Rhythmic Airplay (Billboard)	29
US Rock & Alternative Airplay (Billboard)	9
US Rolling Stone Top 100	46
Venezuela Anglo (Monitor Latino)	15

=== Year-end charts ===
2021 year-end chart performance for "Without You"
Chart (2021)	Position
Australia (ARIA)	4
Australia Hip Hop/R&B (ARIA)	2
Austria (Ö3 Austria Top 40)	13
Belgium (Ultratop Flanders)	6
Belgium (Ultratop Wallonia)	87
Canada (Canadian Hot 100)	9
Croatia (HRT)	43
Denmark (Tracklisten)	12
France (SNEP)	142
Germany (Official German Charts)	23
Global 200 (Billboard)	18
Hungary (Rádiós Top 40)	79
Hungary (Stream Top 40)	61
Iceland (Tónlistinn)	13
Ireland (IRMA)	15
Netherlands (Dutch Top 40)	19
Netherlands (Single Top 100)	17
New Zealand (Recorded Music NZ)	19
Norway (VG-lista)	13
Portugal (AFP)	20
Sweden (Sverigetopplistan)	18
Switzerland (Schweizer Hitparade)	22
UK Singles (OCC)	19
US Billboard Hot 100	17
US Adult Top 40 (Billboard)	9
US Hot Rock & Alternative Songs (Billboard)	3
US Mainstream Top 40 (Billboard)	18
US Rock & Alternative Airplay (Billboard)	20

2022 year-end chart performance for "Without You"
Chart (2022)	Position
Australia (ARIA)	62
Australia Hip Hop/R&B (ARIA)	18
US Adult Contemporary (Billboard)	32
US Hot Rock & Alternative Songs (Billboard)	23

== Certifications ==
Certifications for "Without You"
Region	Certification	Certified units/sales
Australia (ARIA) Remix with Miley Cyrus	8× Platinum	560,000^{‡}
Austria (IFPI Austria)	2× Platinum	60,000^{‡}
Belgium (BRMA)	Platinum	40,000^{‡}
Brazil (Pro-Música Brasil)	3× Platinum	120,000^{‡}
Canada (Music Canada)	6× Platinum	480,000^{‡}
Denmark (IFPI Danmark)	2× Platinum	180,000^{‡}
France (SNEP)	Platinum	200,000^{‡}
Germany (BVMI)	Gold	200,000^{‡}
Italy (FIMI)	Gold	35,000^{‡}
New Zealand (RMNZ)	4× Platinum	120,000^{‡}
Norway (IFPI Norway) Remix with Miley Cyrus	3× Platinum	180,000^{‡}
Poland (ZPAV)	Platinum	50,000^{‡}
Portugal (AFP)	3× Platinum	30,000^{‡}
Spain (Promusicae)	Platinum	60,000^{‡}
Switzerland (IFPI Switzerland)	Platinum	20,000^{‡}
United Kingdom (BPI)	2× Platinum	1,200,000^{‡}
United States (RIAA)	4× Platinum	4,000,000^{‡}
Streaming
Sweden (GLF)	Platinum	8,000,000^{†}
^{‡} Sales+streaming figures based on certification alone.^{†} Streaming-only figures based on certification alone.

== Release history ==
Release dates and formats for "Without You"
Region	Date	Format(s)	Version	Label	Ref.
Australia	18 December 2020	Radio airplay	Original	Sony	
Italy	26 February 2021	Radio airplay	Original	Sony	
Various	30 April 2021	Digital download; streaming	Miley Cyrus remix	Columbia	
