= Purpose World Tour =

2016–17 concert tour by Justin Bieber

- World tour by Justin Bieber
- Promotional poster for the Purpose World Tour
- Location: Africa; Asia; Europe; North America; Oceania; South America
- Associated album: Purpose
- Start date: March 9, 2016
- End date: July 2, 2017
- Legs: 6
- No. of shows: 162
- Attendance: 2.8 million
- Box office: $256 million ($336.25 million in 2025 dollars)

Justin Bieber concert chronology
- Believe Tour (2012–2013); Purpose World Tour (2016–2017); Justice World Tour (2022)

The Purpose World Tour was the third concert tour by Canadian singer Justin Bieber, in support of his fourth studio album Purpose (2015). The tour started on March 9, 2016, in Seattle, Washington, and concluded on July 2, 2017, in London, England. After that, the remaining 14 shows of the tour were cancelled due to Bieber's mental health issues.

According to Pollstar, Purpose World Tour grossed $163.3 million and sold 1,761,642 tickets in 2016 and the 29 shows in 2017 grossed $93.7 million with 1,043,839 tickets sold. Overall, the tour had a total gross of $257 million and 2,805,481 in attendance in 141 shows, becoming one of the highest-grossing concert tours of both 2016 and 2017.

== Background ==
The tour was announced on November 11, 2015, on The Ellen DeGeneres Show. That same day, 58 dates in the United States along Canada were revealed on the singer's website. Due to overwhelming demand, additional shows were added in several cities. On September 30, 2016, Bieber announced that tour dates for New Zealand and Australia were to be released the following week. On October 25, 2016, two tour dates were announced for Mexico, as well as the South American and Central American legs of the tour. On December 5, 2016, Bieber announced on The Ellen DeGeneres Show he would be starting a stadium tour starting in Australia and continue throughout the year in 2017, with dates announced later that day.

== Concert synopsis ==
The show starts with a pre-recorded sequence in which he is "stuck inside a glass cube; then the real Bieber appeared inside a real cube" performing "Mark My Words", scrawling words like "hope" on the walls with a marker, while wearing a long white coat. Later, Bieber rises from below the stage in a large glass cube, "with the hydraulics pushing him higher" during the performance of "Where Are Ü Now", with holograms flashing about, while "Bieber's crew of dancers tumbled onstage in all-white attire as women suspended in midair did acrobatics against a chrome-y, industrial video backdrop." For "I'll Show You", Bieber is "trapped under a literal steel cage while firestorms and spinning whirlwinds engulf him." During the song's chorus, "an LED light show began flashing across its beams, covering him in exploding octagons and digital fireworks." During "The Feeling", acrobats twirled above him, while cosmic projections of Halsey are shown. Later, the performance of "Get Used To It" brought pyrotechnics, as well as movement from the platforms onstage.

The performance of "Love Yourself" has Bieber on acoustic guitar while seated on a red velvet couch down center stage. Later, the acoustic break also continued with a breezy solo rendition of "Home to Mama" and a new song called "Insecurities". After the acoustic set, "Boyfriend" is performed, with dancers in LED-laden black bodysuits creating "a light show" in choreography. Later, "Been You" is performed by Bieber and his dancers, featuring a "dance break", while in "Company", "a hidden platform anchored to the ceiling begins to descend and it turned out to be a giant, suspended trampoline, on which Justin completed a couple of backflips." "No Sense" is followed by the performance of "Hold Tight" and "No Pressure". The performance of "As Long As You Love Me", having a hard electric guitar riffs. Later, Bieber introduced his own act-two drum solo. Wearing a Marilyn Manson T-shirt, he "cheerily introduces and hugs elementary school-aged dancers" during the "Children" performance, which is followed by "Life Is Worth Living", where Bieber is backed by couples in stark white doing a contemporary choreography. In "What Do You Mean?", dancers on skateboards circled the singer, who by then had changed into a pair of joggers emblazoned with the Purpose tour logo. The performance of "Baby" was considered "playful", by Dylan Rupert of Billboard and later he performs "Purpose" at a white grand piano, The concert finishes with "Sorry", where Bieber stood with his dancers beneath a shower of artificial rain.

== Critical reception ==
NME's Luke Morgan Britton named the tour as one of the best live shows of 2016, writing: "It was grandiose, self-indulgent, erratic and, when he could be bothered, had some of the best live singing you'll see. The 'Purpose' tour was like the life of a tortured pop star as performance art." Dylan Rupert of Billboard praised Bieber's vocals for sounding "smooth as ever", while noting that the performance of "Company" was "one of the show's most thrilling (though slightly puzzling) moments" and praising the acoustic set. Marc Snetiker of Entertainment Weekly called it "a concert that shows, beyond a shadow of a doubt, that Bieber is back. [...] Bieber had to prove that his comeback tour is exactly that — a performer's return to top form, not just a fluke of well-produced singles and hooks. That unfortunate weight did seem to bear down on Bieber during the entire show — he brought out no special guests and remained solemn throughout the night — but over time, its heft will diminish." Andrew Matson of Rolling Stone offered a very positive review, declaring: "The concert was sublime vocally, visually and musically, Bieber and his scaled back band did justice to songs in a cavernous space, often elevating the material." [...] "Bieber sang for real, played the piano, acoustic guitar and rock drums all gracefully and danced with zero mistakes. Sure, his energy seemed tentative as his dancers did Matrix capoeira all around him, but the Purpose tour is off to a stellar start, showcasing a musician taking control of his art and an audience vibing along for his journey."

Mikael Wood of Los Angeles Times wrote about Bieber performance, stating: "His face expressionless, he sang with focused intensity — especially in "Hold Tight" and "Life Is Worth Living" — and danced in a powerfully unself-conscious way, as though he were simply a guy trying out moves for his own enjoyment." For Owen R. Smith of Seattle Times, "Nothing could topple the positive quality of the evening overall." Chris Macias of The Sacramento Bee noted that "[F]or all the spectacle, and the occasional lifting of his garments to show off those abs, the Biebs is a bit tentative as a performer." François Marchand of Vancouver Sun analysed the tour, stating: "But all in all it was entertaining and the songs on Purpose are excellent – smooth and steady, atmospheric and deep." Tony Hicks of Mercury News was mixed, noting that "while the visuals were impressive, they masked the fact that Bieber's voice sounded muffled most of the night. [...] He does deserve credit for being in control all night. But that comes at a cost. Until his hair became out of sorts, there wasn't a second that didn't feel scripted, including stints of our hero showing off his musicianship by performing with an acoustic guitar and doing a comically pedestrian drum solo."

In less favorable reviews, Adam Graham from The Detroit News noted the singer "sleep-walked through his choreography, made no attempts to mask his pre-recorded vocals and performed with the enthusiasm of a teenager being forced to clean his room." Jim Louvau of Phoenix New Times wrote: "You'd think that he'd show at least a perfunctory level of joy while performing on stage in front of thousands of ticket-buying fans, but at least outwardly, that was not the case." For MLive, Edward Pevos noted: "When Bieber was dancing, he wasn't singing much. He was also a bit unenthusiastic. It was as if he just wanted to get through the show at times. The microphone was often no where near his mouth while the backing tracks were playing."

Purpose World Tour's Mumbai leg saw an attendance of 60,000 making it one of the highest selling Indian concerts by an English-language artist, eclipsed only by Michael Jackson.

== Set list ==
This set list is representative of the show on March 9, 2016, in Seattle. It is not representative of all concerts for the duration of the tour.

1. "Mark My Words"
2. "Where Are Ü Now"
3. "Get Used to It"
4. "I'll Show You"
5. "The Feeling"
6. "Boyfriend"
7. "Home to Mama" / "Cold Water"
8. "Love Yourself"
9. "Been You"
10. "Company"
11. "No Sense"
12. "Hold Tight"
13. "No Pressure"
14. "As Long as You Love Me"
15. "Children"
16. "Let Me Love You" (Added at the European 1st leg)
17. "Life is Worth Living"
18. "What Do You Mean?"
19. "Baby"
20. "Purpose"
21. "Sorry"

=== Notes ===
- During the show in Vancouver, Bieber performed "One Less Lonely Girl".
- During several shows, Bieber performed an unreleased song, "Insecurities" during the acoustic set.
- During several shows, Bieber performed another unreleased song, "Look At The Stars" during the acoustic set. Bieber posted a video of him singing the song on his Instagram in January 2016.
- During the shows in Louisville, Auburn Hills, Boston, Washington, D.C. & the second show in Chiba, Bieber performed a cover of Justin Timberlake's "Cry Me a River".
- During the show in Ottawa, Bieber performed a cover of Delirious? song, "I Could Sing of Your Love Forever" during the acoustic set.
- During the shows in Greensboro, Baltimore, New York City, Madrid and Monza Bieber performed a cover of Tracy Chapman song "Fast Car" during the acoustic set.
- During the shows in Chiba, Bieber performed "Cold Water" during the acoustic set.

=== Special guests ===
Bieber performed duets with musical guests on some dates of the tour.

- March 20, 2016 – Los Angeles: "Confident" with Chance the Rapper; "No Pressure" with Big Sean
- March 23, 2016 – Los Angeles, "Sorry" with Skrillex
- April 12. 2016 – Atlanta: "Baby" with Ludacris
- April 13, 2016 – Atlanta: "U Got It Bad", "U Don't Have to Call", "Lovers and Friends" and "I Don't Mind" with Usher; "I Wanna Love You" with Akon
- July 19, 2016 – New York City: "No Sense" with Travis Scott; "Never Say Never" with Jaden Smith
- November 17, 2016 – Zurich: "Let Me Love You" with DJ Snake
- April 18, 2017 – San Juan: "Despacito" with Luis Fonsi
- June 25, 2017 – Wireless Festival, Frankfurt: "No Sense" with Travis Scott

== Shows ==
List of concerts, showing date, city, country, venue, opening act, tickets sold, number of available tickets and amount of gross revenue
Date	City	Country	Venue	Opening act	Attendance	Revenue
North America
March 9, 2016	Seattle	United States	KeyArena	Corey Harper; Moxie Raia	12,227 / 12,227	$1,316,780
March 11, 2016	Vancouver	Canada	Rogers Arena	Corey Harper; Moxie Raia	14,648 / 14,648	$1,312,442
March 13, 2016	Portland	United States	Moda Center	Corey Harper; Post Malone; Moxie Raia	14,146 / 14,146	$1,336,071
March 15, 2016	Sacramento	United States	Sleep Train Arena	Post Malone; Moxie Raia	13,786 / 13,786	$1,311,567
March 17, 2016	San Jose	United States	SAP Center	Post Malone; Moxie Raia	13,508 / 13,508	$1,427,847
March 18, 2016	Oakland	United States	Oracle Arena	Post Malone; Moxie Raia	14,828 / 14,828	$1,548,782
March 20, 2016	Los Angeles	United States	Staples Center	Post Malone; Moxie Raia	41,445 / 41,445	$4,365,483
March 21, 2016	Los Angeles	United States	Staples Center	Post Malone; Moxie Raia	41,445 / 41,445	$4,365,483
March 23, 2016	Los Angeles	United States	Staples Center	Post Malone; Moxie Raia	41,445 / 41,445	$4,365,483
March 25, 2016	Las Vegas	United States	MGM Grand Garden Arena	Post Malone; Moxie Raia	11,843 / 11,843	$1,411,304
March 26, 2016	Fresno	United States	Save Mart Center	Post Malone; Moxie Raia	11,874 / 11,874	$1,154,574
March 29, 2016	San Diego	United States	Valley View Casino Center	Post Malone; Moxie Raia	11,571 / 11,571	$1,120,203
March 30, 2016	Glendale	United States	Gila River Arena	Post Malone; Moxie Raia	13,550 / 13,550	$1,319,237
April 2, 2016	Salt Lake City	United States	Vivint Smart Home Arena	Post Malone; Moxie Raia	15,115 / 15,115	$1,400,611
April 4, 2016	Denver	United States	Pepsi Center	Post Malone; Moxie Raia	13,910 / 13,910	$1,457,492
April 6, 2016	Kansas City	United States	Sprint Center	Post Malone; Moxie Raia	13,701 / 13,701	$1,277,251
April 7, 2016	Tulsa	United States	BOK Center	Post Malone; Moxie Raia	13,231 / 13,231	$1,222,176
April 9, 2016	Houston	United States	Toyota Center	Post Malone; Moxie Raia	12,868 / 12,868	$1,407,652
April 10, 2016	Dallas	United States	American Airlines Center	Post Malone; Moxie Raia	14,764 / 14,764	$1,563,919
April 12, 2016	Atlanta	United States	Philips Arena	Post Malone; Moxie Raia	25,717 / 25,717	$2,726,349
April 13, 2016	Atlanta	United States	Philips Arena	Post Malone; Moxie Raia	25,717 / 25,717	$2,726,349
April 19, 2016	St. Louis	United States	Scottrade Center	Post Malone; Moxie Raia	15,450 / 15,450	$1,433,791
April 20, 2016	Louisville	United States	KFC Yum! Center	Post Malone; Moxie Raia	16,496 / 16,496	$1,513,138
April 22, 2016	Rosemont	United States	Allstate Arena	Post Malone; Moxie Raia	28,519 / 28,519	$2,952,529
April 23, 2016	Rosemont	United States	Allstate Arena	Post Malone; Moxie Raia	28,519 / 28,519	$2,952,529
April 25, 2016	Auburn Hills	United States	The Palace of Auburn Hills	Post Malone; Moxie Raia	14,795 / 14,795	$1,538,259
April 26, 2016	Cleveland	United States	Quicken Loans Arena	Post Malone; Moxie Raia	16,028 / 16,028	$1,480,206
April 28, 2016	Columbus	United States	Schottenstein Center	Post Malone; Moxie Raia	13,919 / 13,919	$1,331,983
April 29, 2016	Washington, D.C.	United States	Verizon Center	Post Malone; Moxie Raia	14,917 / 14,917	$1,551,880
May 4, 2016	Brooklyn	United States	Barclays Center	Post Malone; Moxie Raia	29,470 / 29,470	$3,075,262
May 5, 2016	Brooklyn	United States	Barclays Center	Post Malone; Moxie Raia	29,470 / 29,470	$3,075,262
May 7, 2016	Philadelphia	United States	Wells Fargo Center	Post Malone; Moxie Raia	30,535 / 30,535	$3,131,498
May 8, 2016	Philadelphia	United States	Wells Fargo Center	Post Malone; Moxie Raia	30,535 / 30,535	$3,131,498
May 10, 2016	Boston	United States	TD Garden	Post Malone; Moxie Raia	28,406 / 28,406	$2,962,651
May 11, 2016	Boston	United States	TD Garden	Post Malone; Moxie Raia	28,406 / 28,406	$2,962,651
May 13, 2016	Ottawa	Canada	Canadian Tire Centre	The Knocks; Moxie Raia	13,697 / 13,697	$1,327,205
May 14, 2016	Quebec City	Canada	Videotron Centre	The Knocks; Moxie Raia	14,014 / 14,014	$1,318,420
May 16, 2016	Montreal	Canada	Bell Centre	Post Malone; Moxie Raia	15,956 / 15,956	$1,518,543
May 18, 2016	Toronto	Canada	Air Canada Centre	Post Malone; Moxie Raia	31,482 / 31,482	$2,984,876
May 19, 2016	Toronto	Canada	Air Canada Centre	Post Malone; Moxie Raia	31,482 / 31,482	$2,984,876
June 11, 2016	Winnipeg	Canada	MTS Centre	Moxie Raia	12,228 / 12,228	$1,180,804
June 13, 2016	Calgary	Canada	Scotiabank Saddledome	Post Malone; Moxie Raia	12,944 / 12,944	$1,242,290
June 14, 2016	Edmonton	Canada	Rexall Place	Post Malone; Moxie Raia	13,802 / 13,802	$1,292,176
June 16, 2016	Saskatoon	Canada	SaskTel Centre	Post Malone; Moxie Raia	12,741 / 12,741	$1,162,416
June 18, 2016	Fargo	United States	Fargodome	Post Malone; Moxie Raia	12,451 / 12,451	$1,177,819
June 19, 2016	Minneapolis	United States	Target Center	Post Malone; Moxie Raia	14,498 / 14,498	$1,514,540
June 21, 2016	Lincoln	United States	Pinnacle Bank Arena	Post Malone; Moxie Raia	13,048 / 13,048	$1,244,748
June 22, 2016	Des Moines	United States	Wells Fargo Arena	Post Malone; Moxie Raia	13,086 / 13,086	$1,251,093
June 24, 2016	Cincinnati	United States	U.S. Bank Arena	Post Malone; Moxie Raia	12,522 / 12,522	$1,193,105
June 25, 2016	Indianapolis	United States	Bankers Life Fieldhouse	Post Malone; Moxie Raia	14,403 / 14,403	$1,363,344
June 27, 2016	Nashville	United States	Bridgestone Arena	Post Malone; Moxie Raia	14,051 / 14,051	$1,368,341
June 29, 2016	Jacksonville	United States	Jacksonville Arena	Post Malone; Moxie Raia	11,590 / 11,590	$1,116,384
June 30, 2016	Orlando	United States	Amway Center	Post Malone; Moxie Raia	13,282 / 13,282	$1,273,025
July 2, 2016	Miami	United States	American Airlines Arena	Post Malone; Moxie Raia	27,019 / 27,019	$2,836,286
July 3, 2016	Miami	United States	American Airlines Arena	Post Malone; Moxie Raia	27,019 / 27,019	$2,836,286
July 6, 2016	Greensboro	United States	Greensboro Coliseum	Post Malone; Moxie Raia	14,832 / 14,832	$1,421,008
July 7, 2016	Baltimore	United States	Royal Farms Arena	Post Malone; Moxie Raia	13,325 / 13,325	$1,199,139
July 9, 2016	Newark	United States	Prudential Center	Post Malone; Moxie Raia	13,739 / 13,739	$1,475,513
July 10, 2016	Hartford	United States	XL Center	Post Malone; Moxie Raia	11,930 / 11,930	$1,169,815
July 12, 2016	Buffalo	United States	First Niagara Center	Post Malone; Moxie Raia	14,424 / 14,424	$1,376,691
July 13, 2016	Pittsburgh	United States	Consol Energy Center	Post Malone; Moxie Raia	14,508 / 14,508	$1,353,964
July 15, 2016	Atlantic City	United States	Boardwalk Hall	Post Malone; Moxie Raia	12,829 / 12,829	$1,241,152
July 18, 2016	New York City	United States	Madison Square Garden	Post Malone; Moxie Raia	29,425 / 29,425	$3,340,025
July 19, 2016	New York City	United States	Madison Square Garden	Post Malone; Moxie Raia	29,425 / 29,425	$3,340,025
Asia
August 13, 2016	Chiba	Japan	Makuhari Messe	—N/a	25,000 / 25,000	$2,980,580
August 14, 2016	Chiba	Japan	Makuhari Messe	—N/a	25,000 / 25,000	$2,980,580
Europe
August 20, 2016 (Note: The August 20, 2016, concert in Chelmsford, England, at the Hylands Park and the August 21, 2016, concert in Staffordshire, England, at the Weston Park were both part of the V Festival.)	Chelmsford	England	Hylands Park	—N/a	—N/a	—N/a
August 21, 2016	Staffordshire	England	Weston Park	—N/a	—N/a	—N/a
September 8, 2016	Kópavogur	Iceland	Kórinn	Sturla Atlas; Vic Mensa	34,893 / 34,893	$5,009,775
September 9, 2016	Kópavogur	Iceland	Kórinn	Sturla Atlas; Vic Mensa	34,893 / 34,893	$5,009,775
September 14, 2016	Berlin	Germany	Mercedes-Benz Arena	Vic Mensa	13,344 / 13,344	$1,219,782
September 16, 2016	Munich	Germany	Olympiahalle	Vic Mensa	13,204 / 13,204	$1,275,680
September 18, 2016	Cologne	Germany	Lanxess Arena	Vic Mensa	16,524 / 16,524	$1,395,423
September 20, 2016	Paris	France	AccorHotels Arena	The Knocks; Vic Mensa	32,179 / 32,179	$2,576,666
September 21, 2016	Paris	France	AccorHotels Arena	The Knocks; Vic Mensa	32,179 / 32,179	$2,576,666
September 23, 2016	Oslo	Norway	Telenor Arena	The Knocks	45,234 / 45,234	$3,950,932
September 24, 2016	Oslo	Norway	Telenor Arena	The Knocks	45,234 / 45,234	$3,950,932
September 26, 2016	Helsinki	Finland	Hartwall Arena	The Knocks	23,354 / 23,354	$2,486,008
September 27, 2016	Helsinki	Finland	Hartwall Arena	The Knocks	23,354 / 23,354	$2,486,008
September 29, 2016	Stockholm	Sweden	Tele2 Arena	The Knocks; MiC Lowry	79,380 / 79,380	$5,474,781
September 30, 2016	Stockholm	Sweden	Tele2 Arena	The Knocks; MiC Lowry	79,380 / 79,380	$5,474,781
October 2, 2016	Copenhagen	Denmark	Telia Parken	The Knocks; MiC Lowry	51,080 / 51,080	$3,615,874
October 5, 2016	Antwerp	Belgium	Sportpaleis	The Knocks; MiC Lowry	37,616 / 37,616	$2,890,081
October 6, 2016	Antwerp	Belgium	Sportpaleis	The Knocks; MiC Lowry	37,616 / 37,616	$2,890,081
October 8, 2016	Arnhem	Netherlands	GelreDome	The Knocks; MiC Lowry	70,428 / 70,428	$5,236,048
October 9, 2016	Arnhem	Netherlands	GelreDome	The Knocks; MiC Lowry	70,428 / 70,428	$5,236,048
October 11, 2016	London	England	The O_{2} Arena	The Knocks; MiC Lowry	63,868 / 63,868	$4,865,897
October 12, 2016	London	England	The O_{2} Arena	The Knocks; MiC Lowry	63,868 / 63,868	$4,865,897
October 14, 2016	London	England	The O_{2} Arena	The Knocks; MiC Lowry	63,868 / 63,868	$4,865,897
October 15, 2016	London	England	The O_{2} Arena	The Knocks; MiC Lowry	63,868 / 63,868	$4,865,897
October 17, 2016	Birmingham	England	Barclaycard Arena	The Knocks; MiC Lowry	31,269 / 31,269	$2,458,371
October 18, 2016	Birmingham	England	Barclaycard Arena	The Knocks; MiC Lowry	31,269 / 31,269	$2,458,371
October 20, 2016	Manchester	England	Manchester Arena	The Knocks; MiC Lowry	49,586 / 49,586	$3,700,285
October 21, 2016	Manchester	England	Manchester Arena	The Knocks; MiC Lowry	49,586 / 49,586	$3,700,285
October 23, 2016	Manchester	England	Manchester Arena	The Knocks; MiC Lowry	49,586 / 49,586	$3,700,285
October 24, 2016	Birmingham	England	Genting Arena	The Knocks; MiC Lowry	14,970 / 14,970	$1,168,892
October 26, 2016	Sheffield	England	Sheffield Arena	The Knocks; MiC Lowry	13,126 / 13,126	$1,034,351
October 27, 2016	Glasgow	Scotland	SSE Hydro	The Knocks; MiC Lowry	38,193 / 38,193	$2,963,880
October 29, 2016	Glasgow	Scotland	SSE Hydro	The Knocks; MiC Lowry	38,193 / 38,193	$2,963,880
October 30, 2016	Glasgow	Scotland	SSE Hydro	The Knocks; MiC Lowry	38,193 / 38,193	$2,963,880
November 1, 2016	Dublin	Ireland	3Arena	The Knocks; MiC Lowry	25,301 / 25,301	$2,304,928
November 2, 2016	Dublin	Ireland	3Arena	The Knocks; MiC Lowry	25,301 / 25,301	$2,304,928
November 8, 2016	Vienna	Austria	Wiener Stadthalle	The Knocks; MiC Lowry	15,988 / 15,988	$1,427,759
November 9, 2016	Zagreb	Croatia	Arena Zagreb	The Knocks; MiC Lowry	18,103 / 18,103	$1,326,854
November 11, 2016	Kraków	Poland	Tauron Arena	The Knocks; MiC Lowry	16,010 / 16,010	$1,320,727
November 12, 2016	Prague	Czech Republic	O_{2} Arena	The Knocks; MiC Lowry	18,384 / 18,384	$1,129,114
November 14, 2016	Hamburg	Germany	Barclaycard Arena	The Knocks; MiC Lowry	13,493 / 13,493	$1,208,095
November 16, 2016	Frankfurt	Germany	Festhalle	The Knocks; MiC Lowry	12,185 / 12,185	$1,255,135
November 17, 2016	Zürich	Switzerland	Hallenstadion	The Knocks; MiC Lowry	13,735 / 13,735	$1,461,928
November 19, 2016	Bologna	Italy	Unipol Arena	The Knocks; MiC Lowry	27,418 / 27,418	$2,062,484
November 20, 2016	Bologna	Italy	Unipol Arena	The Knocks; MiC Lowry	27,418 / 27,418	$2,062,484
November 22, 2016	Barcelona	Spain	Palau Sant Jordi	The Knocks; MiC Lowry	17,828 / 17,828	$1,478,323
November 23, 2016	Madrid	Spain	Barclaycard Center	The Knocks; MiC Lowry	14,300 / 14,537	$1,450,184
November 25, 2016	Lisbon	Portugal	MEO Arena	The Knocks; MiC Lowry	19,380 / 19,380	$1,233,487
November 28, 2016	London	England	The O_{2} Arena	The Knocks; MiC Lowry	32,366 / 32,366	$2,313,609
November 29, 2016	London	England	The O_{2} Arena	The Knocks; MiC Lowry	32,366 / 32,366	$2,313,609
North America
February 15, 2017	Monterrey	Mexico	Estadio BBVA Bancomer	—N/a	45,535 / 45,535	$3,491,598
February 18, 2017	Mexico City	Mexico	Foro Sol	Robin Schulz	155,201 / 155,201	$9,340,236
February 19, 2017	Mexico City	Mexico	Foro Sol	Robin Schulz	155,201 / 155,201	$9,340,236
February 21, 2017	Mexico City	Mexico	Foro Sol	Robin Schulz	155,201 / 155,201	$9,340,236
Oceania
March 6, 2017	Perth	Australia	nib Stadium	Martin Garrix; Sheppard	24,129 / 24,129	$2,820,168
March 10, 2017	Melbourne	Australia	Etihad Stadium	Martin Garrix; Sheppard	54,821 / 54,821	$5,483,928
March 13, 2017	Brisbane	Australia	Suncorp Stadium	Martin Garrix; Sheppard	41,000 / 41,000	$4,256,386
March 15, 2017	Sydney	Australia	ANZ Stadium	Martin Garrix; Sheppard	65,836 / 65,836	$6,163,843
March 18, 2017	Auckland	New Zealand	Mount Smart Stadium	Martin Garrix; Sheppard	35,420 / 35,420	$3,678,465
Latin America
March 23, 2017	Santiago	Chile	Estadio Nacional	—N/a	43,000 / 43,000	$5,007,755
March 29, 2017	Rio de Janeiro	Brazil	Praça da Apoteose	Rudy Mancuso	30,801 / 30,801	$3,332,095
April 1, 2017	São Paulo	Brazil	Allianz Parque	Rudy Mancuso	88,273 / 88,273	$9,187,869
April 2, 2017	São Paulo	Brazil	Allianz Parque	Rudy Mancuso	88,273 / 88,273	$9,187,869
April 5, 2017	Lima	Peru	Estadio Nacional	King Lotus, David Cabrera Morillos	25,103 / 29,365	$2,326,212
April 8, 2017	Quito	Ecuador	Estadio Olímpico Atahualpa	4 A.M.	13,047 / 16,254	$1,420,349
April 12, 2017	Bogotá	Colombia	Estadio El Campín	Ali Stone	18,783 / 22,507	$2,024,896
April 15, 2017	Punta Cana	Dominican Republic	Hard Rock Hotel & Casino	—N/a	9,482 / 11,024	$1,022,669
April 18, 2017	San Juan	Puerto Rico	José Miguel Agrelot Coliseum	—N/a	12,560 / 14,194	$1,606,420
April 21, 2017	Panama City	Panama	Plaza Figali	—N/a	7,676 / 7,676	$896,402
April 24, 2017	San Jose	Costa Rica	Estadio Nacional	Bartosz Brenes	23,377 / 26,985	$2,082,325
Asia
May 3, 2017	Tel Aviv	Israel	Yarkon Park	Static & Ben El Tavori	57,958 / 58,000	$6,321,104
May 6, 2017	Dubai	United Arab Emirates	Autism Rocks Arena	Deen Squad; Hamza Hawsawi; Rodge	23,936 / 29,690	$3,327,376
May 10, 2017	Mumbai	India	DY Patil Stadium	Sartek; Zaeden; Alan Walker	39,376 / 39,376	$3,515,105
Africa
May 14, 2017	Johannesburg	South Africa	FNB Stadium	Sketchy Bongo	58,896 / 68,984	$3,078,163
May 17, 2017	Cape Town	South Africa	Cape Town Stadium	Sketchy Bongo	39,706 / 45,214	$2,316,485
Europe
June 3, 2017 (Note: The June 3, 2017, concert in Landgraaf, Netherlands, at Megaland is a part of Pinkpop Festival.)	Landgraaf	Netherlands	Megaland	—N/a	—N/a	—N/a
June 5, 2017	Aarhus	Denmark	Jysk Væddeløbsbane	Rudimental; Gnash; Adam Daniel	36,000 / 36,000	$2,880,000
June 7, 2017 (Note: The June 7, 2017, concert in Stavanger, Norway, at Forus Travbane is a part of Sommerfesten 2017.)	Stavanger	Norway	Forus Travbane	—N/a	—N/a	—N/a
June 10, 2017 (Note: The June 10, 2017, concert in Stockholm, Sweden, at Gärdet is a part of Summerburst Festival 2017.)	Stockholm	Sweden	Gärdet	—N/a	—N/a	—N/a
June 15, 2017	Bern	Switzerland	Stade de Suisse	Halsey	32,108 / 40,236	$3,151,958
June 18, 2017 (Note: The June 18, 2017, concert in Monza, Italy, at Autodromo Nazionale Monza is a part of I-Days Festival.)	Monza	Italy	Autodromo Nazionale Monza	Martin Garrix; Bastille; Alma; Mamacita	—N/a	—N/a
June 21, 2017	Dublin	Ireland	RDS Arena	John Gibbons Halsey	30,653 / 31,740	$3,487,723
June 24, 2017 (Note: The June 24, 2017, concert in Lille, France, at Stade Pierre-Mauroy is a part of North Summer Festival.)	Lille	France	Stade Pierre-Mauroy	—N/a	—N/a	—N/a
June 25, 2017 (Note: The June 25, 2017, concert in Frankfurt, Germany, at Commerzbank-Arena is a part of Wireless Festival.)	Frankfurt	Germany	Commerzbank Arena	—N/a	—N/a	—N/a
June 30, 2017	Cardiff	Wales	Principality Stadium	Halsey	38,434 / 45,021	$2,680,252
July 2, 2017 (Note: The July 2, 2017, concert in London, England, at Hyde Park is a part of British Summer Time Festival.)	London	England	Hyde Park	Martin Garrix; Tove Lo; Anne-Marie	—N/a	—N/a
Total					2,832,121 / 2,897,874 (99%)	$259,364,636

== Cancelled shows ==
Date	City	Country	Venue	Reason
April 11, 2017	Medellín	Colombia	Atanasio Girardot Sports Complex	Logistics issue
July 29, 2017	Arlington	United States	AT&T Stadium	Depression
August 5, 2017	Pasadena	United States	Rose Bowl	Depression
August 12, 2017	Denver	United States	Sports Authority Field at Mile High	Depression
August 18, 2017	Minneapolis	United States	U.S. Bank Stadium	Depression
August 23, 2017	East Rutherford	United States	MetLife Stadium	Depression
August 24, 2017	East Rutherford	United States	MetLife Stadium	Depression
August 29, 2017	Foxborough	United States	Gillette Stadium	Depression
September 5, 2017	Toronto	Canada	Rogers Centre	Depression
September 6, 2017	Toronto	Canada	Rogers Centre	Depression
September 23, 2017	Tokyo	Japan	Ajinomoto Stadium	Depression
September 24, 2017	Tokyo	Japan	Ajinomoto Stadium	Depression
September 27, 2017	Hong Kong	China	AsiaWorld–Arena	Depression
September 30, 2017	Bocaue	Philippines	Philippine Arena	Depression
October 7, 2017	Singapore		Singapore National Stadium	Depression
