= Company (Justin Bieber song) =

Single by Justin Bieber

from the album Purpose
- Released: March 8, 2016
- Recorded: September 3, 2015
- Studio: Jungle City Studios, New York City
- Genre: Electropop; R&B
- Length: 3:27
- Label: Def Jam
- Songwriters: Justin Bieber; Andreas Schuller; James Wong; Leroy Clampitt; Jason Boyd; James Abrahart; Thomas Troelsen
- Producers: Axident; Gladius; Big Taste

Justin Bieber singles chronology
"Love Yourself" (2015)	"Company" (2016)	"Cold Water" (2016)

Music video
- "Company" on YouTube

"Company" is a song by Canadian singer and songwriter Justin Bieber from his fourth studio album Purpose (2015). Written by Bieber, Poo Bear, James Abrahart, Andreas Schuller, Thomas Troelsen, James Wong and Leroy Clampitt, the song was produced by Axident, Gladius, Big Taste and co-produced by Boyd. It was released to American rhythmic contemporary and contemporary hit radio stations on March 8, 2016, as the album's fourth and final single. It is an electropop and R&B song, with bass guitar, guitar and percussion in its instrumentation. Lyrically, "Company" talks about looking forward to getting to know someone attractive, but also sets some healthy boundaries for doing so.

As an album track, it reached the top-forty in the majority of the countries it charted. When it was released as a single, the song managed to reach the top-forty in Australia and peaked at number 53 in the United States. Bieber performed the track on the 3rd iHeartRadio Music Awards and 2016 Billboard Music Awards, as well as on his Purpose World Tour. Two music videos were made for the song: the video which is part of the "Purpose: The Movement" narrative, released on November 14, 2015, and the official music video released on June 8, 2016.

== Background and release ==
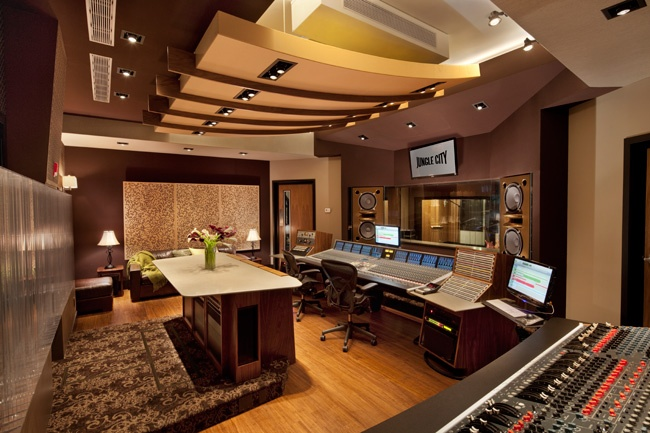
This song was recorded at Jungle City Studios (pictured)

While working on the album, Bieber invited his personal friend, American songwriter and producer Poo Bear, to collaborate on the record – both had previously worked on Bieber's second compilation album, Journals, in 2013. They collaborated on the record, writing a lot of songs, until his label tried to set up writing camps for Bieber, but he declined and kept on working with Boyd. As declared by Boyd during an interview for The Fader, "We're just thinking about making sure that [the music] it's not negative, but uplifting. Even the music that talks about his relationships, it's feel-good music. It's nothing that will make you depressed. [...] We're so in tune with each other, that it's easy to know what we're both gonna love, what he would love to sing. We worked really hard on this project. We really honest with ourselves." While being asked if there were any songs that he was especially excited about, Boyd claimed that one of them was "Company".

In early February 2016, it was reported that Def Jam Recordings, Bieber's label, was eyeing to release "Company" as the follow-up to his previous successful single, "Love Yourself". The label's promotional team informally tipped radio professionals the week of February 16, 2016, as reported by Headline Planet. A week later, Billboard confirmed that "Company" would serve as the album's fourth single, and that it would impact both rhythmic contemporary and contemporary hit radio stations on March 8, 2016. On April 7, 2016, a remix by the Knocks was posted on the band's SoundCloud account, as they announced they would be the opening act on selected dates of Bieber's Purpose World Tour.

== Composition and lyrics ==
"Company" was written by Justin Bieber, Poo Bear, James Abrahart, Andreas Schuller, Thomas Troelsen, James Wong and Leroy Clampitt. It was produced by Axident, Gladius and Big Taste, and co-produced by Boyd. According to the sheet music published at Musicnotes.com by Alfred Publishing Company, the song is composed in the key of E minor with a moderately R&B groove of 95 beats per minute. Bieber's vocals range from the note of D_{3} to B_{4}. It is an electropop and R&B song, with bass guitar, guitar and percussion in its instrumentation. The song has "a mellow, calm yet sparkly mood, which was noted to be reminiscent from his previous album, Journals (2013). Lyrically, "Company" talks about seeking surface-level companionship on the dance floor.

During the track, the protagonist is looking forward to getting to know someone attractive, but also sets some healthy boundaries for doing so, which can be seen in the lyrics: "You ain't gotta be my lover for you to call me baby/ … Just wanna have a conversation."

== Reception ==
=== Critical ===
The song received critical acclaim. Patrick Ryan of USA Today called it a "pulsing come-hither." Amy Davidson of Digital Spy opined that "'Company' is basically what happens when Justin Bieber feels like a non-committal hook-up during a stop on his gruelling tour and writes a cool R&B serenade to convince you it's a good idea." Sheldon Pearce of Complex called it "a strutting electropop tune [that] project[s] emotional availability." Brennan Carley of Spin named it "the triumphant Grecian sunrise that is the mid-album highlight." For Al Horner of NME, "the funk-laced 'Company' is a hit-in-waiting," while Megan Downing of MTV UK labelled it "an easy-listening track oozing with coolness." Casey Lewis of Teen Vogue thought that the song "sounds like the comeback track Usher wishes he had, which is to say that it's good, just absolutely nothing like the quartet of singles he released while hyping this album."

=== Commercial ===
Commercially, "Company" charted after the release of Purpose in a number of countries. In the United States, the song debuted at number 53 on the Billboard Hot 100, along with other sixteen tracks of the album. After being released as a single, "Company" re-entered at number 89, and it peaked once again at number 53. It was later certified gold by the Recording Industry Association of America. In New Zealand, the song debuted at number 30, after the album's release, reaching the top-twenty the following week, at number 18, which became its peak position. Later, the song re-entered at number 36, when it was released as a single, but only went to reach number 27 as its highest position. In Australia, the song entered at number 41, on the week of April 3, 2016, peaking two weeks later at number 34, becoming Bieber's first single to miss the top-twenty since "Hold Tight" (2013).

== Music videos ==
=== Purpose: The Movement ===
Two music videos were made for the song. The first was released along with the "Purpose: The Movement" project on November 14, 2015. As stated by Bustle's Claire Landsbaum, "[It] follows a group of women who meet a group of guys in a diner. One member of each party leaves the restaurant and does a sexy couple's dance in front of a lit-up Hard Rock Café, but at 3:17 [the] protagonists are replaced by lots of gyrating women behind a mysterious hotel room door."

=== Official video ===
On May 16, 2016, Bieber revealed that another music video for the song was going to be released. The official music video was directed by Bieber's personal videographer Rory Kramer and released on June 8, 2016, and features cameo appearances from Floyd Mayweather, Daisy Ridley, Ken Watanabe, Josh Gad, Ralph Fiennes, Mark Hamill and Kevin Bacon. It's a documentary-style compilation of clips of the singer on his world travels. In the workshop "The Creative Process with Rory Kramer" by the Canon Creator Lab, Kramer said, that he started editing the music video for Company on his own initiative from material that he had recorded at the time. When he showed his work to Bieber and Scooter, the two were thrilled and wanted it to be the official music video for Company. According to Bieber in a statement, "Personally, I love this video because it's an honest look at my journey. The process of putting together this album and this tour — surrounded by people I love to be with — has been really special. I'm proud of it, it's been a lot of fun and lot of hard work, and I think that really shows in video. I hope my fans like it as I much as I do, because it's really all for you."

The video starts out with Bieber pensive, shirtless and downcast as he gazes over the calm waters of the Santorini basin and sits alone in the dark on a child's swing. Later, the video also features footage from the Purpose World Tour, as well as clips of Bieber in the studio recording the album, and snippets of him on the set of his Calvin Klein photo shoot. Interspersed are sweeping images of Bieber looking out over nature, reminiscent of his earlier 'I'll Show You' video."

== Live performances ==
"Company" was first performed on April 3, 2016, at the 3rd iHeartRadio Music Awards after an acoustic rendition of "Love Yourself". Sporting blond dreadlocks, gold chains and a loose-fitting red jacket, Bieber went into the crowd and danced with a fan during the performance. The song was also performed on the 2016 Billboard Music Awards, before Bieber performed "Sorry". The performance featured jets of fire and a wash of lights. It was also added to the setlist of his Purpose World Tour. During the performance, "a hidden platform anchored to the ceiling begins to descend and it turned out to be a giant, suspended trampoline, on which the singer completed a couple of backflips."

== Credits and personnel ==
Recording

- Recorded at Jungle City Studios, New York.
- Mixed at Record Plant Studios, California.

Personnel

- Justin Bieber – writing, vocals.
- Jason "Poo Bear" Boyd – writing, co-production.
- James Abrahart – writing, production.
- Andreas Schuller – writing, percussion.
- Thomas Troelsen – writing
- James Wong – writing, production, guitar.
- Leroy Clampitt – writing, production, bass guitar.
- Andrew Wuepper – mixing
- Josh Gudwin – mixing, recording.
- Brandon Harding – mixing assistant.
- Henrique Andrade – mixing assistant.
- Zeke Mishanec – recording assistant.

Credits adapted from the liner notes of Purpose, Def Jam Recordings.

== Charts ==
2015–2016 chart performance for "Company"
Chart (2015–2016)	Peak position
Australia (ARIA)	34
Belgium (Ultratip Bubbling Under Flanders)	3
Belgium (Ultratip Bubbling Under Wallonia)	5
Canada Hot 100 (Billboard)	38
Canada CHR/Top 40 (Billboard)	20
Canada Hot AC (Billboard)	47
Czech Republic Singles Digital (ČNS IFPI)	48
Denmark (Tracklisten)	25
Finland Airplay (Radiosoittolista)	21
France (SNEP)	181
Ireland (IRMA)	30
Italy (FIMI)	93
Lebanon (OLT20)	13
Mexico Ingles Airplay (Billboard)	25
Netherlands (Single Top 100)	14
New Zealand (Recorded Music NZ)	18
Norway (VG-lista)	31
Portugal (AFP)	66
Slovakia Singles Digital (ČNS IFPI)	45
South Africa Airplay (EMA)	1
Spain (Promusicae)	75
Sweden (Sverigetopplistan)	35
UK Singles (Official Charts)	25
US Billboard Hot 100	53
US Adult Pop Airplay (Billboard)	38
US Dance Airplay (Billboard)	39
US Pop Airplay (Billboard)	16
US Rhythmic Airplay (Billboard)	18

2026 chart performance for "Company"
Chart (2026)	Peak position
Global 200 (Billboard)	155
Greece International (IFPI)	93

== Certifications ==
Certifications for "Company"
Region	Certification	Certified units/sales
Australia (ARIA)	2× Platinum	140,000^{‡}
Brazil (Pro-Música Brasil)	Diamond	250,000^{‡}
Canada (Music Canada)	2× Platinum	160,000^{‡}
Denmark (IFPI Danmark)	Platinum	90,000^{‡}
Italy (FIMI)	Gold	25,000^{‡}
Mexico (AMPROFON)	Platinum	60,000^{‡}
New Zealand (RMNZ)	3× Platinum	90,000^{‡}
Poland (ZPAV)	Gold	25,000^{‡}
Portugal (AFP)	Gold	5,000^{‡}
Spain (Promusicae)	Gold	30,000^{‡}
Sweden (GLF)	Gold	20,000^{‡}
United Kingdom (BPI)	Platinum	600,000^{‡}
United States (RIAA)	2× Platinum	2,000,000^{‡}
Streaming
Greece (IFPI Greece)	Gold	1,000,000^{†}
^{‡} Sales+streaming figures based on certification alone.^{†} Streaming-only figures based on certification alone.

== Release history ==
Release dates and formats for "Company"
Country	Date	Format	Label	Ref.
United States	March 8, 2016	Rhythmic contemporary	Def Jam	
United States	March 8, 2016	Contemporary hit radio	Def Jam	
Italy	July 22, 2016	Contemporary hit radio	Universal	

== See also ==
- List of number-one singles of 2016 (South Africa)
