= Love Yourself =

2015 single by Justin Bieber

Single by Justin Bieber

from the album Purpose
- Released: November 9, 2015
- Recorded: September 28, 2015
- Studio: Ginger Recording Studios (Cremorne, New South Wales)
- Genre: Pop; folk; blue-eyed soul
- Length: 3:53
- Label: Def Jam
- Songwriters: Justin Bieber; Benjamin Levin; Ed Sheeran
- Producer: Benny Blanco

Justin Bieber singles chronology
"Sorry" (2015)	"Love Yourself" (2015)	"Company" (2016)

Music video
- "Love Yourself" on YouTube

"Love Yourself" is a song recorded by Canadian singer Justin Bieber for his fourth studio album Purpose (2015). The song was released as the album's third official single on November 9th, 2015. It was written by Ed Sheeran and Benny Blanco, and produced by the latter. A pop song, "Love Yourself" features an electric guitar and a brief flurry of trumpets as its main instrumentation. During the song, Bieber uses a husky tone in the lower registers. Lyrically, the song is a kiss-off to a narcissistic ex-lover.

On the US Billboard Hot 100 and the UK Singles Chart, the song became Bieber's third consecutive number-one, wherein the United States it spent 24 non-consecutive weeks in the top ten (later named the best-performing single of 2016) and was also Bieber's first number one on the Adult Contemporary chart, while in the United Kingdom, it spent six weeks at the top. "Love Yourself" topped the charts in fifteen countries, including Australia, Brazil, Canada, New Zealand, and Sweden. "Love Yourself" was nominated for two Grammy Awards: Song of the Year and Best Pop Solo Performance. It was the seventh-best-selling song of 2016 in the US.

The music video for the song was released along with the Purpose: The Movement project on November 14th, 2015. It features dancers Keone & Mari Madrid doing an interpretive dance in a house. Bieber promoted the song with performances on TV shows, as well as awards shows throughout 2015–16 while adding it on the set list of his Purpose World Tour.

== Background and release ==
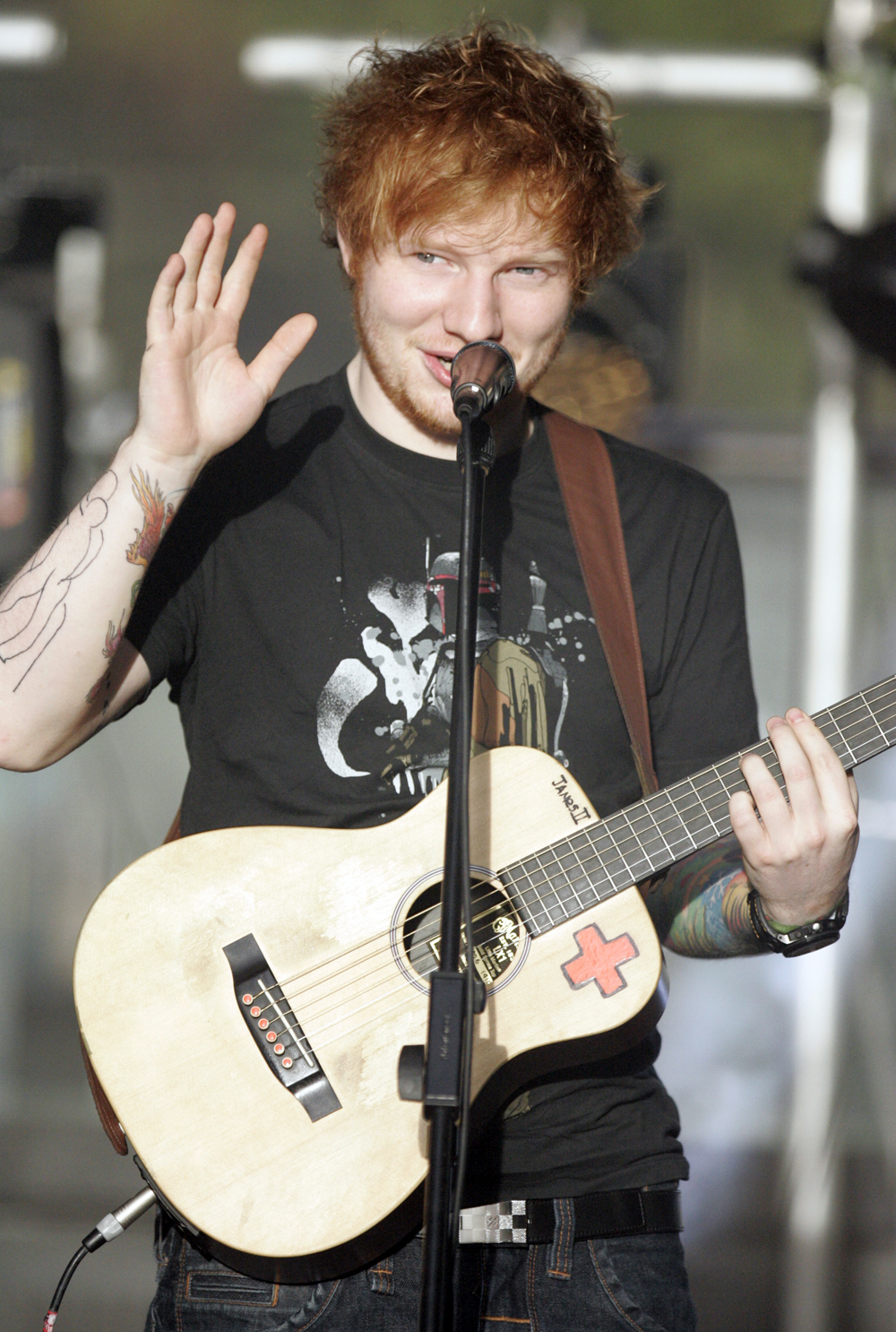
Ed Sheeran (pictured) initially wrote "Love Yourself" for his album ÷ before giving it to Bieber.

Ed Sheeran and Benny Blanco co-wrote the song and all lyrics on a tour bus in 2015. The melody was the first part written, followed by the lyrics, which Sheeran said would be "a modern-day Mrs. Robinson." Blanco responded, saying, "I feel like it should be about some real shit... Is there any relationship shit, or nothing right now?" to which Sheeran replied, "I don't really want to write a song about it." Blanco then suggested, "So why don't you write it about that?"(this gave the idea for the line "I didn't wanna write a song") after which, Sheeran worked on writing the song with Blanco producing, with the entire outline of the song being completed on the tour bus.

On September 29th, 2015, Justin Bieber announced in an interview with Australia's Sunrise morning show that British singer and songwriter Ed Sheeran had written a song for his then-upcoming album. Later, during an interview for Capital FM, Bieber revealed details about the song, saying: "It's just me and a guitar. Basically that's how I started, playing on the street with a guitar." About Sheeran, he said: "I think he's one of the most talented writers in the game right now, so just to have his input and his stories and our stories and match them up together and say 'What have you been through?,' and telling the same story." In another interview for the same radio network, he commented about the collaboration, stating: "It was a process. Just getting us together, you know, in the same room cause we did a lot of it separate. He is a good guy, super talented. Really good songwriter so just to be able to work with that calibre of songwriter was really, really awesome." In 2017, Sheeran revealed that "Love Yourself" was written for his album ÷. He said in an interview that the track would have been scrapped before Bieber took the song.

On November 9th, 2015 "Love Yourself" premiered on Beats 1 along with "The Feeling". The song was also made available on iTunes in the same day as a promotional single of Purpose, and later it was announced as the album's official third radio single. When talking to Ryan Seacrest, Bieber said "Love Yourself" is "definitely about someone in my past, someone who I don't want to put on blast," he described the song as "cool because so many people can resonate with that because how many women do we bring back that mom doesn't really necessarily like?".

== Composition and lyrics ==
"Love Yourself"
A 23-second sample of "Love Yourself"'s chorus.

"Love Yourself" was written by Ed Sheeran, Benny Blanco and Justin Bieber, with production being done by Benny Blanco, who was also responsible for the song's instrumentation and programming. It features lyrical vocals by Bieber and background vocals by Sheeran. According to the sheet music published at Musicnotes.com by Sony/ATV Music Publishing, the song is composed in the key of E major with a moderate tempo of 100 beats per minute and a time signature of 4/4. Bieber's vocals range from the note of B_{2} to B_{3}. It is an acoustic pop, folk and blue-eyed soul song, featuring just vocals and an electric guitar, and a brief flurry of trumpets, which was considered "the most subdued and least electronic of Bieber's new tracks."

Lyrically, "Love Yourself" is a kiss-off to a narcissistic friend who did the protagonist wrong, with Bieber singing in a snappy tone while criticizing "a girl for loving herself too much." In the pre-chorus, he sings with a husky tone in the lower registers: "My mama don't like you, and she likes everyone," "in a style that molds well to Sheeran's," according to Rolling Stone's Brittany Spanos. "And I [never] like to admit that I was wrong. And I've been so caught up in my job, didn't see what's going on, and now I know, I'm better sleeping on my own," he continues. In the chorus, Bieber sings, "Cause if you like the way you look that much, oh baby, you should go and love yourself," which according to Digital Spy's Amy Davidson, "'love yourself' means 'go f**k yourself' in this context." On March 7, 2017, Sheeran revealed on The Howard Stern Show that he had Rihanna in mind for the song at first, and the original lyric was indeed "fuck yourself". In the song's bridge, Bieber uses a "brass-and-vocalese" style.

== Critical reception ==
Andrew Unterberger of Spin called it "an earth-salting, cruelly chuckling kiss-off track, it features an unprecedented-for-Bieber caliber of lyrical detail, and its minimal arrangement allows every lyrical barb to pop like one of the song's palm-mutes. For such sour grapes, though, 'Love Yourself' still sounds exultant; one of many reminders this year that for all his insistence on being a good person, Bieber may ultimately be best served as a Top 40 heel." Leah Greenblatt of Entertainment Weekly complimented the track as one of her favourites from the album, naming it "the world's first campfire-folk diss track". Amy Davidson of Digital Spy agreed, calling it a 'deliciously evil poison-pen ballad'. Sheldon Pearce of Complex praised "Sorry" and "Love Yourself" for "display[ing] the best of Bieber in tandem: the full scope of his pop stylings—blue-eyed soul fleshing out both electronic and acoustic spaces." Kenneth Partridge of Billboard wrote that Bieber "overplay[s] his renewed spirituality ... mak[ing] like John Mayer doing Sam Smith," citing the track as an example. Josh Gonzalez of Music Times thought the song was "a cool change of pace and nod musically to his 2014 duet with Cody Simpson 'Home to Mama'," adding: "Bieber is a great vocalist and does well on acoustic tracks."

For Consequence of Sound editor Janine Schaults, "all the credit goes to Sheeran's cherubic magic powers. Refreshingly, just a guitar and a lonely trumpet interlude accompany Bieber's coy delivery." Michelles Geslani of the same publication opined that the track "sounds exactly what you'd expect from a meeting of these two minds", considering it "'Thinking Out Loud' crossed with low-key, lovelorn Bieber." Kitty Empire, writing for The Observer, appreciated the song for "strip[ping] everything back very effectively to a guitar line and a vocal". Annie Zaleski of The A.V. Club was mixed, noting that "despite being a nicely deadpan kiss-off to a snobby ex, is generic acoustic-pop." In a less favorable review, Pitchfork's Brad Nelson wrote that, lyrically, "it's needlessly mean, neither funny nor clever, and it doesn't do much to justify the severity of its perspective." Al Horner of NME noted that the song is "more traditionally Bieber, and [its] big pop hook [is] out of place amidst the forward-thinking electronic scuttle." Sam C. Mac of Slant Magazine called the lyrics "unintentionally hilarious". Alex Macpherson of The National called it "a cloying Ed Sheeran collaboration". Billboard ranked "Love Yourself" at number 34 on their "100 Best Pop Songs of 2016" list.

== Chart performance ==
=== United States ===
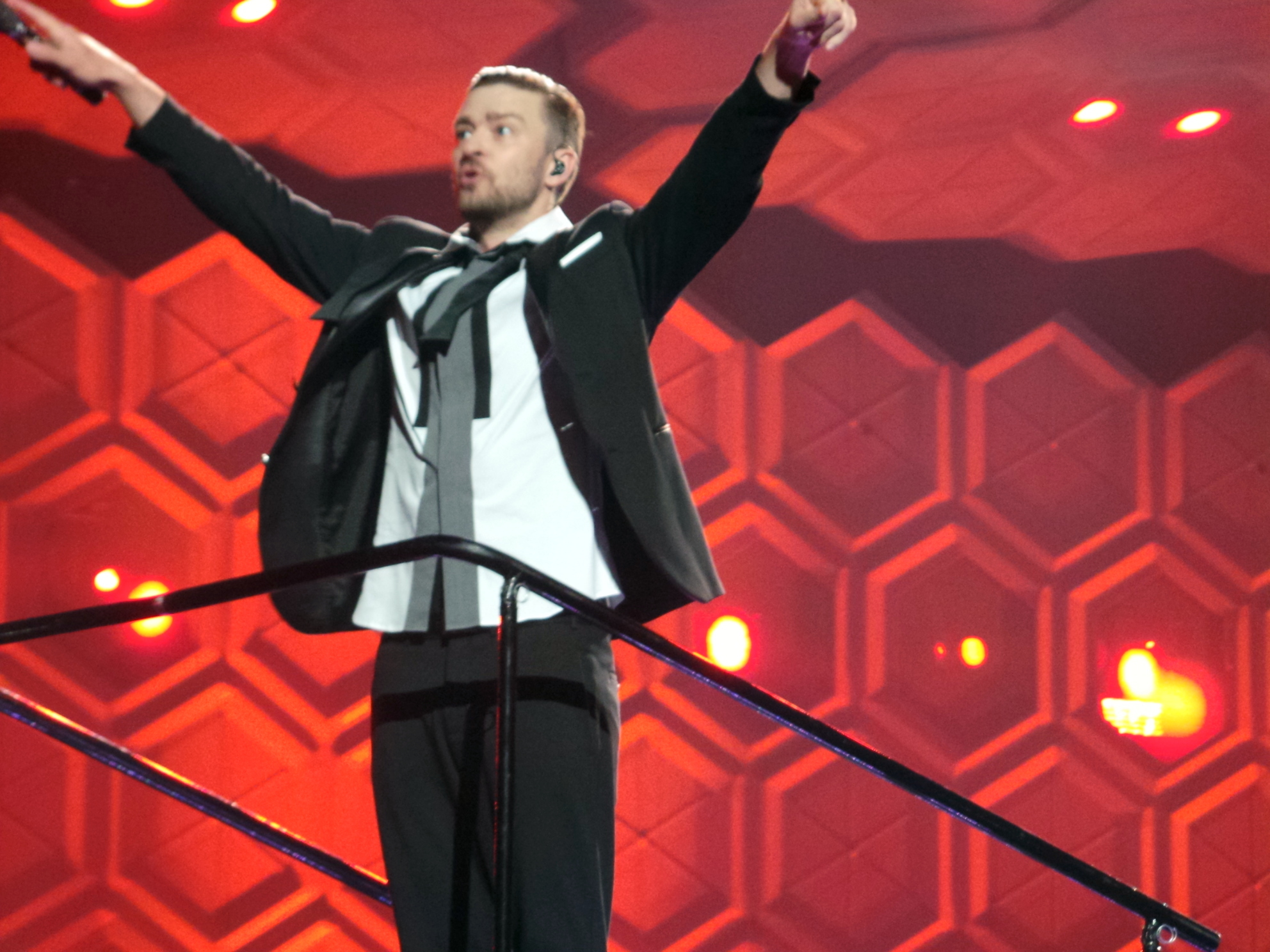
Bieber became the first male artist since Justin Timberlake (pictured) in 2006 to achieve three number-ones in the U.S. from an album.

In the United States, the song debuted at number four on the Billboard Hot 100, giving Bieber his ninth top-ten song and his third consecutive top-ten debut from Purpose. It debuted at number two and four on the Digital Songs and Streaming Songs charts respectively, with 141,000 downloads and 17.4 million streams. The following week, it descended to number seven on the Hot 100. Two weeks later, it ascended from seven to five on the Hot 100, meanwhile Bieber's "Sorry" and "What Do You Mean?" were at number two and four respectively. Thus, as he did three weeks prior when "Love Yourself" debuted at number four, Bieber had three concurrent songs in the Hot 100's top five, becoming the third act to achieve it since 50 Cent in 2005. Bieber and The Beatles are the only acts to earn the honor as a lead artist on all three songs. On the chart dated February 6, 2016, "Love Yourself" ascended from three to two on the Hot 100, meanwhile Bieber's "Sorry" was at number one. With the feat, Bieber became the 17th act in the Hot 100's history to rank at numbers 1 and 2 simultaneously. He was also the 11th act to hold the Hot 100's top two as a lead artist on both songs.

The following week, "Love Yourself" replaced "Sorry" at number one, becoming his third consecutive number-one single. Thus, Bieber was the 12th artist to succeed himself in the Hot 100's 57-year history; the last artist before Bieber was The Weeknd, who is also from Canada. Additionally, Bieber's Purpose became the first album by a male artist to produce three number-one songs since Justin Timberlake's FutureSex/LoveSounds did so in 2006–07. After being replaced at the top of the Hot 100 by Zayn's debut single as a solo artist, "Pillowtalk", for one week, it returned to the number one position the following date. Also, "Love Yourself" replaced "Sorry" at the top of the Radio Songs chart with a 144 million weekly audience, becoming Bieber's second number-one song on the chart. However, the next week, "Love Yourself" was replaced at the top by Rihanna's "Work" and descended to number two. By the middle of 2016, the song had sold 1.6 million copies in the U.S. On the chart dated May 7, 2016, "Love Yourself" spent its 23rd consecutive week in the Hot 100's top ten, breaking the record for the most consecutive weeks logged in the top 10 from a song's debut, previously set by Nicki Minaj's "Starships", Maroon 5's "Sugar" and Bieber's both "What Do You Mean?" and "Sorry". It has since been passed by The Chainsmokers's "Closer" (2016–2017), which spent 32 weeks in the top 10. And then later passed by Post Malone's "Circles" with 33 weeks. The song would spend its 24th and final week in the top ten on the chart dating May 21, 2016. Additionally, the song spent an eleventh week at the top of the Radio Songs chart. Additionally, on the chart dated 14 May 2016, "Love Yourself" became Bieber's first chart-topper on the Adult Contemporary chart. The song was the most-played song in the United States in 2016, with nearly 4 billion audience impressions.

During 2016, "Love Yourself" sold 1.8 million copies in the US, thus being listed seventh on the best-selling songs of the year list. Overall, it has sold 2.7 million copies in the country.

"Love Yourself" finished at No. 1 on the Billboard Hot 100 Year-End of 2016 released in December 2016, becoming Bieber's highest-charting song on Hot 100 Year-End to date, surpassing "Boyfriend" on the Hot 100 Year-End of 2012. This made him the youngest artist to date to receive a No. 1 single on a Hot 100 Year-End chart in Billboard's history.

=== United Kingdom ===
In the United Kingdom, "Love Yourself" debuted at number three on the UK Singles Chart on 19 November 2015, after the release of Purpose. The following week, it rose to number two before replacing "Sorry" at the top of the chart on 4 December 2015. Bieber is the first artist to replace themselves at the chart's summit since Elvis Presley in 2005. "Love Yourself" marked Bieber's third consecutive chart-topping song in Britain. The following week, the song stayed at the top of the chart with 114,000 combined sales and "Sorry" stayed at number two, which made Bieber the first artist ever to knock himself off the top spot with both songs holding at one and 2 for two consecutive weeks. "Love Yourself" and "Sorry" remained at the same place the next week, which made Bieber the first artist ever to log four weeks at numbers one and 2 consecutively, breaking the record previously held by The Beatles, who logged three consecutive weeks at numbers one and 2 in 1967–68. "Love Yourself" was beaten to the top by NHS Choir's "A Bridge Over You" charity single by nearly 31,000 chart sales. However, the single rose to the number-one spot the next week, logging a fourth week at the summit and claiming the first number-one song of 2016. The following week, it remained at number one, making Bieber the first artist on the UK Singles Chart to occupy the top three spots on the chart at the same time with "Sorry" at number two and "What Do You Mean?" climbing one place to three. "Love Yourself" spent six non-consecutive weeks at number one. On 4 January 2016, the Official Charts Company announced that 'Love Yourself' has earned 719,000 combined sales.

=== Australia ===
In Australia, "Love Yourself" debuted at number three on the ARIA Singles Chart, after the release of Purpose, giving Bieber his fifth top-three single in the country. That week the singer had three songs inside the top ten: "Sorry" (2), "Love Yourself" (3) and "What Do You Mean?" (7). Two weeks later, "Love Yourself" was the most streamed track in the country and rose to number two, also it earned a gold certification for sales of over 35,000 copies. In its fourth week, the song ascended from two to one, dethroning Adele's "Hello" and earning a platinum certification for sales of over 70,000 copies. With that, Bieber became the only act to have two number-one songs in 2015 following his previous single "What Do You Mean?", which topped the chart for four consecutive weeks in September. The song stayed at the top of the chart the following two weeks. On its third week at number one, Bieber's 'Sorry' and "What Do You Mean?" were at number two and eight, respectively. With that, Bieber became the first act to dominate the top two positions since Macklemore & Ryan Lewis did in 2013 with "Same Love" and "Thrift Shop". He also was the first act to have three singles inside the chart's top ten since 2012. The song was the first number-one song of 2016 and has spent seven consecutive weeks at number one, which places Bieber at number 8 on the list for the most accumulated weeks (11) at number one in the 2010s. Also, it is his longest-running number-one single in Australia. "Love Yourself" also topped the charts in Sweden, Ireland, New Zealand, Netherlands and Denmark.

== Music video ==
There are two music videos for the song:

=== Original Version ===
The original version was filmed in black and white, shows Bieber singing alone in an infinity cove.

=== Purpose: The Movement ===
The second music video was released on YouTube on November 14, 2015, along with the videos for the other songs from "Purpose: The Movement". The video starts with Bieber saying: "Love isn't 'do this for me and I'm going to do this for you.' That's not what love is. Love is just 'I'm gonna do this for you because I wanna do this for you.'" Later, the video features husband and wife dancers Keone and Mari Madrid dancing their way through their house. They are later seen dancing on their phone screens. The video ends when the wife wakes up and finds a note on her husband's pillow saying, "Love Yourself".

The video was directed by Parris Goebel. As of June 2025, the music video has received over 1.7 billion views on YouTube.

== Live performances and covers ==
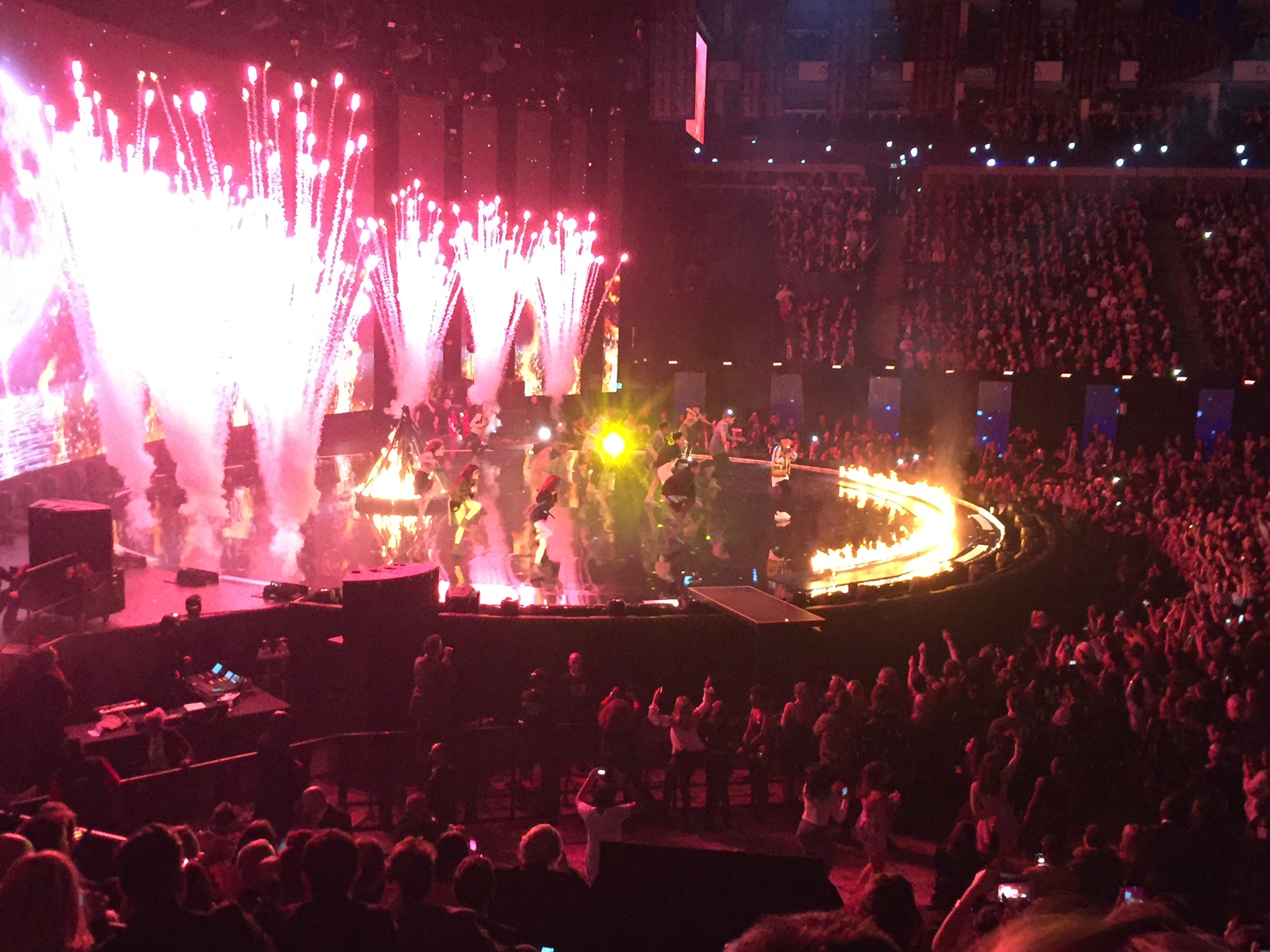
Bieber during his show at 2016 Brit Awards

Bieber first performed "Love Yourself" on The Ellen DeGeneres Show during Purpose week release. On November 18, 2015, the song was also performed on The Today Show along with other tracks from the album. Bieber also added the song to the set list of his show on Capital FM's Jingle Bell Ball 2015. He performed the song at the 58th Annual Grammy Awards. The singer performed an acoustic version of the track with James Bay on the guitar before performing "Sorry" during the 2016 Brit Awards. He also performed an acoustic version of the song during the 3rd iHeartRadio Music Awards before proceeding to a full performance of "Company". "Love Yourself" is also part of the setlist of his Purpose World Tour. The performance has Bieber on acoustic guitar while seated on a red velvet couch down center stage. He performed the song at Radio Disney Music Awards during a special pocket show for fans, previously recorded. On June 4, 2017, Bieber performed "Love Yourself" at the One Love Manchester benefit concert for the victims of the Manchester Arena bombing.

Canadian singer Alessia Cara posted a video covering of the song on her YouTube channel on November 14, 2015. English singer Conor Maynard also posted a video covering the song on his YouTube channel on November 17, 2015. American singer Halsey also performed a cover version for Triple J's Like a Version studio in Australia on February 4, 2016. Her version garnered attention since she replaced "love yourself" with "fuck yourself". British singers Yo Preston and Kelly Kiara teamed up to write a reply to the song, with the version being called "Love Yourself vs F*ck Yourself". In their version, Kiara responds to Bieber's lyrics taking about the boy's cheating habits and overwhelming jealousy. Their version charted on the ARIA Charts, reaching the top-twenty, peaking at number 16.

The song was also covered by American pop punk band Grayscale for Punk Goes Pop Vol. 7, a compilation album of covers, which was released by Fearless Records on July 14, 2017. Spanish singer Maikel Delacalle posted a video covering of the song on his YouTube channel on November 18, 2016.

Nataly Dawn released an acoustic version as a single in 2016.

== Credits and personnel ==
Recording

- Recorded at Ginger Recording Studios, New South Wales
- Mixed at Henson Recording Studios

Personnel

- Justin Bieber – vocals, backing vocals, songwriting
- Benny Blanco – production, songwriting, instrumentation, programming
- Ed Sheeran – songwriting, backing vocals
- Philip Beaudreau – trumpet
- Chris "Anger Management" Sclafani – engineering
- Simon Cohen – engineering
- Josh Gudwin – engineering, mixing
- Chris "Tek" O'Ryan – additional engineering
- Henrique Andrade – additional engineering
- Derrick Stockwell – mixing assistant
- Andrew "McMuffin" Luftman – production coordinator
- Seif "Mageef" Hussain – production coordinator

Credits adapted from the liner notes of Purpose, Def Jam Recordings and Tidal.

== Charts ==
=== Weekly charts ===
Chart (2015–2016)	Peak position
Argentina Airplay (Monitor Latino)	10
Australia (ARIA)	1
Austria (Ö3 Austria Top 40)	2
Belgium (Ultratop 50 Flanders)	2
Belgium (Ultratop 50 Wallonia)	3
Canada Hot 100 (Billboard)	1
Canada AC (Billboard)	1
Canada CHR/Top 40 (Billboard)	1
Canada Hot AC (Billboard)	1
Czech Republic Airplay (ČNS IFPI)	1
Czech Republic Singles Digital (ČNS IFPI)	1
Denmark (Tracklisten)	1
Ecuador Airplay (National-Report)	13
Finland (Suomen virallinen lista)	7
France (SNEP)	4
Germany (GfK)	3
Hungary (Editors' Choice Top 40)	22
Hungary (Single Top 40)	6
Hungary (Stream Top 40)	3
Iceland (RÚV)	4
Ireland (IRMA)	1
Israel International Airplay (Media Forest)	1
Italy (FIMI)	10
Japan Hot 100 (Billboard)	75
Lebanon (Lebanese Top 20)	1
Mexico Airplay (Billboard)	2
Netherlands (Dutch Top 40)	1
Netherlands (Single Top 100)	1
New Zealand (Recorded Music NZ)	1
Norway (VG-lista)	3
Poland Airplay (ZPAV)	3
Portugal (AFP)	1
Romania Airplay (Media Forest)	1
Scottish Singles Sales (Official Charts)	1
Slovakia Airplay (ČNS IFPI)	1
Slovakia Singles Digital (ČNS IFPI)	1
Slovenia Airplay (SloTop50)	1
South Africa Airplay (EMA)	1
South Korea (Gaon)	57
Spain (Promusicae)	2
Sweden (Sverigetopplistan)	1
Switzerland (Schweizer Hitparade)	4
UK Singles (Official Charts)	1
US Billboard Hot 100	1
US Adult Contemporary (Billboard)	1
US Adult Pop Airplay (Billboard)	1
US Dance Airplay (Billboard)	2
US Pop Airplay (Billboard)	1
US Rhythmic Airplay (Billboard)	2

Chart (2021)	Peak position
Portugal Airplay (AFP)	89

Chart (2022)	Peak position
Global Excl. U.S. (Billboard)	157

Chart (2026)	Peak position
Austria (Ö3 Austria Top 40)	53
Denmark (Tracklisten)	39
France (SNEP)	149
Global 200 (Billboard)	25
Greece International (IFPI)	23
Hong Kong (Billboard)	21
Malaysia (IFPI)	16
Malaysia International (RIM)	10
Netherlands (Single Top 100)	40
Norway (VG-lista)	58
Panama Streaming (PRODUCE)	139
Philippines Hot 100 (Billboard Philippines)	32
Singapore (RIAS)	24
Spain (Promusicae)	68
Sweden (Sverigetopplistan)	39
Taiwan (Billboard)	7
Vietnam Hot 100 (Billboard)	91

=== Year-end charts ===
Chart (2015)	Position
Australia (ARIA)	25
Germany (Official German Charts)	98
Netherlands (Dutch Top 40)	81
Netherlands (Single Top 100)	46
Sweden (Sverigetopplistan)	51
UK Singles (OCC)	24

Chart (2016)	Position
Argentina (Monitor Latino)	39
Australia (ARIA)	10
Austria (Ö3 Austria Top 40)	13
Belgium (Ultratop Flanders)	15
Belgium (Ultratop Wallonia)	21
Canada (Canadian Hot 100)	2
Denmark (Tracklisten)	2
France (SNEP)	12
Germany (Official German Charts)	12
Hungary (Single Top 40)	33
Iceland (Plötutíóindi)	8
Israel (Media Forest)	6
Italy (FIMI)	18
Netherlands (Dutch Top 40)	21
Netherlands (Single Top 100)	7
New Zealand (Recorded Music NZ)	3
Poland (Polish Airplay Top 100)	23
Slovenia (SloTop50)	11
South Korea (Gaon)	51
Spain (PROMUSICAE)	12
Sweden (Sverigetopplistan)	10
Switzerland (Schweizer Hitparade)	9
UK Singles (OCC)	8
US Billboard Hot 100	1
US Adult Contemporary (Billboard)	2
US Adult Top 40 (Billboard)	7
US Dance/Mix Show Airplay (Billboard)	12
US Mainstream Top 40 (Billboard)	1
US Rhythmic (Billboard)	23
Worldwide (IFPI)	2

Chart (2017)	Position
Brazil (Pro-Música Brasil)	166
South Korea (Gaon)	65
US Adult Contemporary (Billboard)	24

Chart (2019)	Position
South Korea (Gaon)	173

Chart (2021)	Position
South Korea (Gaon)	186

Chart (2022)	Position
South Korea (Circle)	183

Chart (2023)	Position
South Korea (Circle)	160

Chart (2024)	Position
South Korea (Circle)	188

=== Decade-end charts ===
Chart (2010–2019)	Position
Australia (ARIA)	26
Netherlands (Single Top 100)	27
UK Singles (Official Charts Company)	14
US Billboard Hot 100	42

=== All-time charts ===
Chart	Position
US Billboard Pop Songs (1992–2017)	65
US Billboard Hot 100 (1958-2018)	193

== Certifications ==
Region	Certification	Certified units/sales
Australia (ARIA)	15× Platinum	1,050,000^{‡}
Austria (IFPI Austria)	Gold	15,000^{‡}
Belgium (BRMA)	2× Platinum	40,000^{‡}
Brazil (Pro-Música Brasil)	4× Diamond	1,000,000^{‡}
Canada (Music Canada)	Diamond	800,000^{‡}
Denmark (IFPI Danmark)	7× Platinum	630,000^{‡}
Germany (BVMI)	Diamond	1,000,000^{‡}
Italy (FIMI)	6× Platinum	300,000^{‡}
Japan (RIAJ)	Gold	100,000^{*}
Mexico (AMPROFON)	4× Platinum+Gold	270,000^{‡}
New Zealand (RMNZ)	9× Platinum	270,000^{‡}
Norway (IFPI Norway)	5× Platinum	300,000^{‡}
Poland (ZPAV)	4× Platinum	200,000^{‡}
Portugal (AFP)	5× Platinum	125,000^{‡}
South Korea	—	2,500,000
Spain (Promusicae)	5× Platinum	300,000^{‡}
Sweden (GLF)	9× Platinum	360,000^{‡}
United Kingdom (BPI)	6× Platinum	3,600,000^{‡}
United States (RIAA)	9× Platinum	9,000,000^{‡}
Streaming
Greece (IFPI Greece)	Platinum	2,000,000^{†}
Japan (RIAJ)	Platinum	100,000,000^{†}
South Korea	—	100,000,000
^{*} Sales figures based on certification alone.^{‡} Sales+streaming figures based on certification alone.^{†} Streaming-only figures based on certification alone.

== Release history ==
Country	Date	Format	Label	Ref.
Various	November 9, 2015	Digital download	Def Jam	
Italy	April 15, 2016	Contemporary hit radio	Universal	

== See also ==
- List of best-selling singles in Australia
- List of Billboard Hot 100 number-one singles of 2016
- List of number-one singles of 2015 (Australia)
- List of number-one singles of 2016 (Australia)
- List of Canadian Hot 100 number-one singles of 2016
- List of number-one singles of 2016 (South Africa)
- List of number-one international songs of 2016 (South Korea)
- List of UK Singles Chart number ones of the 2010s
- Billboard Year-End Hot 100 singles of 2016
