= List of number-one singles of 2016 (South Africa) =

The South African Airplay Chart ranks the best-performing singles in South Africa. Its data, published by Entertainment Monitoring Africa, is based collectively on each single's weekly airplay.

== List of number-one singles of 2016 ==
Date	Song	Artist(s)	Ref.
5 January	"We Dance Again"	Black Coffee featuring Nakhane Toure	
12 January	"Hello"	Adele	
19 January	"Sorry"	Justin Bieber	
26 January	"Sorry"	Justin Bieber	
2 February	"Sorry"	Justin Bieber	
9 February	"Sorry"	Justin Bieber	
16 February	"Sorry"	Justin Bieber	
23 February	"Love Yourself"	Justin Bieber	
1 March	"Love Yourself"	Justin Bieber	
8 March	"Work"	Rihanna featuring Drake	
15 March	"Work"	Rihanna featuring Drake	
22 March	"Work"	Rihanna featuring Drake	
29 March	"Work"	Rihanna featuring Drake	
5 April	"Work"	Rihanna featuring Drake	
12 April	"Work"	Rihanna featuring Drake	
19 April	"Work"	Rihanna featuring Drake	
26 April	"Ngud'"	Kwesta featuring Cassper Nyovest	
3 May	"Ngud'"	Kwesta featuring Cassper Nyovest	
10 May	"Ngud'"	Kwesta featuring Cassper Nyovest	
17 May	"Ngud'"	Kwesta featuring Cassper Nyovest	
24 May	"Ngud'"	Kwesta featuring Cassper Nyovest	
31 May	"Ngud'"	Kwesta featuring Cassper Nyovest	
7 June	"Company"	Justin Bieber	
14 June	"Can't Stop the Feeling!"	Justin Timberlake	
21 June	"Can't Stop the Feeling!"	Justin Timberlake	
28 June	"Can't Stop the Feeling!"	Justin Timberlake	
5 July	"Can't Stop the Feeling!"	Justin Timberlake	
12 July	"Can't Stop the Feeling!"	Justin Timberlake	
19 July	"In Common"	Alicia Keys	
26 July	"In Common"	Alicia Keys	
2 August	"In Common"	Alicia Keys	
9 August	"In Common"	Alicia Keys	
16 August	"In Common"	Alicia Keys	
23 August	"In Common"	Alicia Keys	
30 August	"In Common"	Alicia Keys	

== Number-one artists ==
Position	Artist	Weeks at No. 1
1	Justin Bieber	8
2	Rihanna	7
2	Drake	7
2	Alicia Keys	7
3	Kwesta	6
3	Cassper Nyovest	6
4	Justin Timberlake	5
5	Black Coffee	1
5	Nakhane Toure	1
5	Adele	1

== See also ==
- 2016 in music
- Entertainment Monitoring Africa
