= Purpose (Justin Bieber album) =

- Standard edition cover (Note: The deluxe edition cover features a black background font. The alternative standard edition cover in the Middle East and Indonesia features Bieber standing on a mountain and watching the sea with no shirt on. Top on the middle, there's a title that says "PURPOSE". Down below, Justin Bieber's name is shown darkly. The alternative cover was reportedly created by Bieber's team after several Muslim nations across the Middle East, as well as Indonesia, took issue with Bieber being shirtless in the artwork and flaunting his cross tattoo, promoting Christianity.)

Studio album by Justin Bieber
- Released: November 13, 2015
- Genres: Dance-pop; EDM; R&B; tropical house
- Length: 48:13
- Labels: Def Jam; RBMG; Schoolboy
- Producers: Justin Bieber; BloodPop; Skrillex; MdL; Benny Blanco; Axident; Gladius; Big Taste; Poo Bear; The Audibles; Soundz; Mike Dean; Ian Kirkpatrick; The Mogul; Diplo; Maejor; Nico Hartikainen; Jeremy Snyder; Steve James; Josh Abraham; Oligee; A.C.; Andre Harris; D.K. The Punisher; DJ Tay James; Josh Gudwin; Andre Watt; Louis Bell; Jordan Ware; Karl Rubin Brutus; Tom Strahle

Justin Bieber chronology
| Journals (2013) | Purpose (2015) | Changes (2020) |

Singles from Purpose
- 1. "What Do You Mean?" Released: August 28, 2015; 2. "Sorry" Released: October 22, 2015; 3. "Love Yourself" Released: November 9, 2015; 4. "Company" Released: March 8, 2016

Purpose is the fourth studio album by the Canadian singer Justin Bieber. It was released through Def Jam Recordings and School Boy Records on November 13, 2015, as a follow-up to his third studio album Believe (2012). The album features guest appearances from Big Sean, Travis Scott, Halsey, Jack Ü, and Ariana Grande. The deluxe version was released simultaneously on the same day. It features an extra guest appearance from Nas. Production was handled by Bieber and Jack Ü themselves, BloodPop, Benny Blanco, the Audibles, Soundz, Mike Dean, Ian Kirkpatrick, and Andre Harris, among others.

In early 2015, Bieber collaborated with Skrillex and Diplo on the US top-ten single, "Where Are Ü Now", from their debut studio album as Jack Ü, Skrillex and Diplo Present Jack Ü; the song also appears on Purpose. Bieber then found what would be the record's sonic direction and worked with Skrillex on a handful of the album's songs. Purpose was described as a mix of EDM and dance-pop, with influences of tropical house in some tracks and live instruments such as acoustic guitars in some others, with the help of his friend and frequent musical collaborator, Poo Bear.

Purpose debuted at number one on the US Billboard 200, earning 649,000 album-equivalent units in its first week of release, giving Bieber the largest first-week sales of his career and his sixth number-one album in the United States. Elsewhere, it reached the top of the charts in another eleven countries. The album was supported by four singles: "What Do You Mean?", "Sorry", "Love Yourself", and "Company". The former three singles all reached number one on the Canadian Hot 100, US Billboard Hot 100 and the UK Singles Chart. The album was among the best-selling albums of both 2015 and 2016. Purpose is a pop, R&B, soul, and EDM album. The album was developed after the release of his compilation album, Journals (2013), which saw him move musically in a more R&B direction.

Purpose was nominated for Album of the Year and Best Pop Vocal Album at the 2017 Grammy Awards. "Love Yourself" was nominated for Song of the Year and Best Pop Solo Performance. The album won the American Music Award for Favorite Pop/Rock Album. To promote the album, Bieber gave several televised interviews and performances, as well as releasing "dance videos" for all of the album's tracks in a project called Purpose: The Movement. Furthermore, Bieber embarked on his Purpose World Tour in 2016, which was his first concert tour to perform in major stadiums worldwide. The album has since been certified 6× platinum by the Recording Industry Association of America (RIAA).

== Background ==
While promoting his third studio album, Believe (2012), with the album's Believe Tour throughout 2012 and 2013, Bieber started recording songs on the tour and confirmed in January 2013 that he was writing for a new album. Five months later he confirmed a new album for 2013, with his manager announcing they were going to think outside the box and release a different type of album. In October 2013, Bieber started the "Music Mondays" project, a ten-week digital download campaign in which one new song was released every Monday night. After the completion of the project, in December 2013, Bieber released the ten songs from the campaign along with new tracks in a limited-edition collection called Journals. Quickly afterwards in January 2014, record producer Douglas Romanow announced that Bieber was recording new music with him. In the same month, Jason "Poo Bear" Boyd, who previously worked on the majority of songs on Journals, started recording heavily with the singer as well. The next month, the singer confirmed he was recording new music. In March 2014, he posted on his Instagram a preview of a song called "Life Is Worth Living", while in April, he promised on his Twitter about his new music and that it would be the "best" he had ever made, while working in the recording studio on the album.

== Writing and recording ==
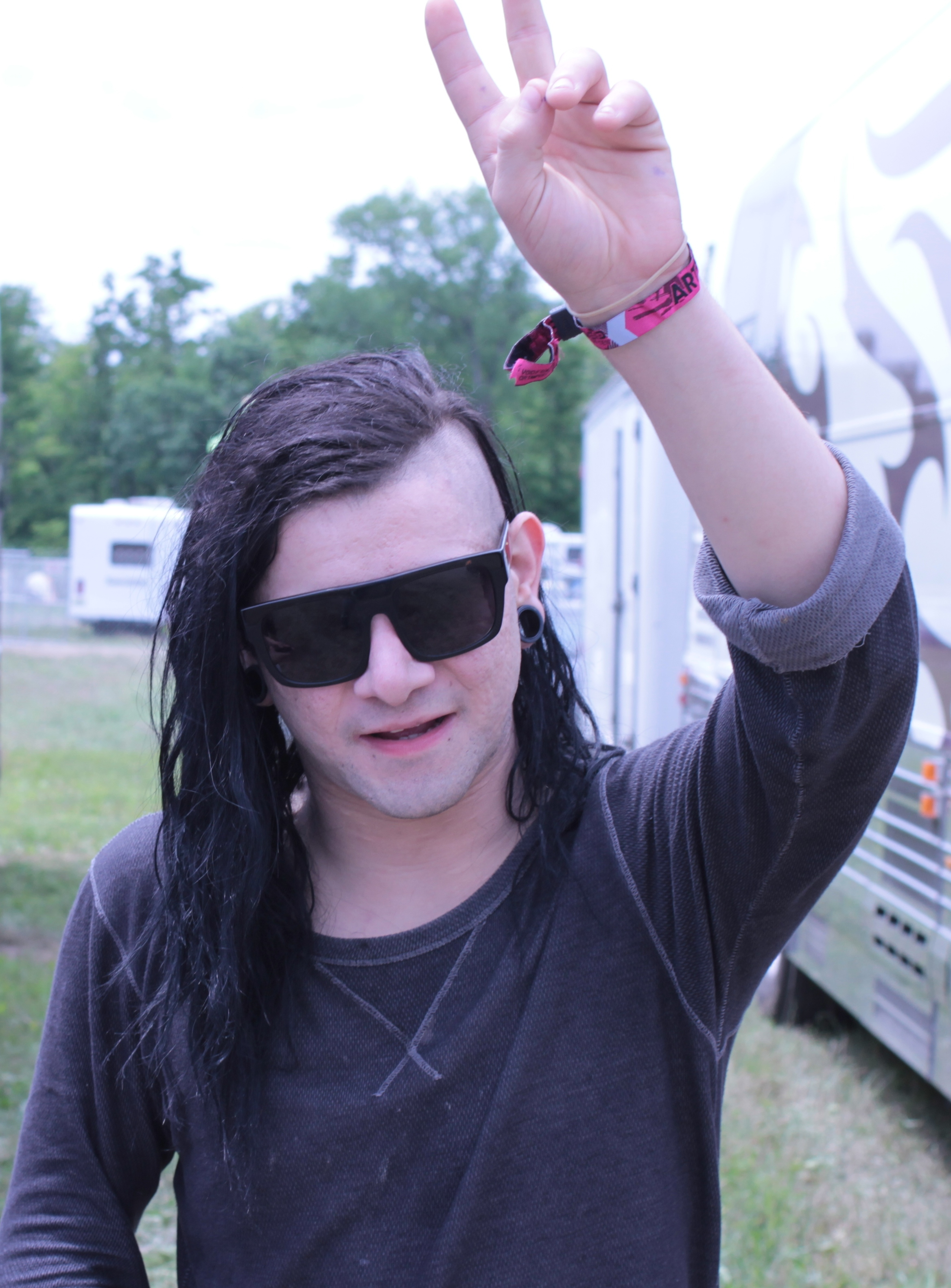
American producer Skrillex played a pivotal role on the album's musical direction, producing six of its songs.

Over a few months in 2014, he continued to tease snippets of new songs on his social media, – none of them were released, though some were later leaked online – as well as possible collaborators, such as Ariana Grande, T-Pain, Cody Simpson and others. With Simpson, he planned to release an acoustic collaboration album, even having a photo shoot for the project, but decided to cancel; instead they released a standalone single called "Home to Mama" in November 2014. His label also organized writing camps with a handful of songwriters to write songs for the singer, however he didn't feel connected with the songs. In November 2014, it was reported that American DJs and producers Diplo and Skrillex were working with Bieber on the album. Eventually, he promised a new album for 2015, declaring that it was going to be "a great new chapter for me." In January 2015, his manager Scooter Braun shared on his Instagram a picture of Bieber with record producer Rick Rubin, while in March 2015, in an interview for USA Today, Bieber announced he was working with Kanye West. During the interview, he also revealed that he had to redo the whole album since "it didn't match up to where I am now and where my head's at." According to himself, "What you are thinking about all the time is what you write, and now that I'm thinking about more positive things, it completely changes my music."

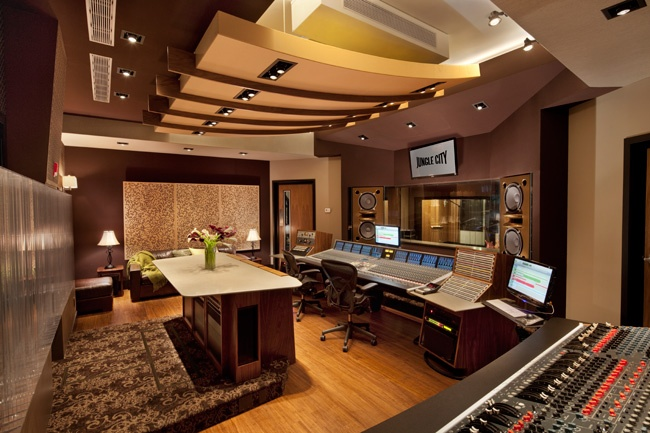
Parts of the album were recorded at Jungle City Studios in New York City.

In a July interview, he talked about working with Skrillex, saying: "Skrillex is a genius. He's super futuristic and I just love his sounds. I think being able to incorporate that sound with what I’m doing has been super cool because it's like new and fresh, and I feel like no one's done it before." Skrillex also commented about working with Bieber, explaining: "I heard some well-written songs that were really good that they wanted me to do production on and from there, we wrote some new songs. It was an opportunity to try some stuff that I had never done before and we ended up making something really unique." Bieber also commented about West, declaring: "I've been in the studio with him for the past month or so. I think that he just pushes you. He definitely wants it to be my way and my direction and he doesn't want to steal what I want...that's why artists love to go to him, because he pulls something out of you that other people don't." In August 2015, Billboard reported that Bieber was also working with Mason "MdL" Levy and Semi Precious Weapons' Justin Tranter. In October 2015, his manager teased a possible collaboration with American singer Halsey, while Bieber confirmed that British singer-songwriter Ed Sheeran wrote a song for the album.

== Composition ==
In August 2015, Jason Lipshut of Billboard reported that the album was "apparently [going to be] a mix of EDM-pop, soul following the downbeat acoustic-R&B of his 2013 project Journals." Lipshut also noted that "sources say that the new album will include multiple piano ballads in which Bieber reflects upon his personal missteps, as well as spoken-word outros where he directly addresses his fans." According to SoulBounce, the album's sound is "reminiscent of Chris Brown’s pop side". In an interview during the Wango Tango festival, Bieber talked about the album's direction, saying: "Overall, I'm just happy with the place I'm at creatively. I feel like this is probably the best I've been. There's not really a direction. It's like, uplifting music that people can dance to...it's a little different, it's really uplifting and people are going to smile when they listen to it." When asked if the song "Where Are Ü Now", previously released as a single from Jack Ü (a duo between DJs and the album's collaborators Diplo and Skrillex) which features Bieber, would be indicative of the sound on the album, he responded that the album would have "'snippets of that type of stuff' (presumably EDM) but that that would be 'really musical [with] a lot of real instrumentation'." He also commented that he was "trying to have a consistent sound and I get kind of depressed cause I’m so... like, I want it to work so badly. You know I want people to love it, and inspire people and sometimes I feel like, is this good enough? Is this the direction I want to go?." Purpose blends dance beats, EDM vibes with stripped-down R&B ballads. The album also makes use of atmospheric instruments as well as hi-hats, bass and synths.

The downtempo intro track "Mark My Words" was considered a prelude into the album's overall sound: a "mix of both up-beat and mellow tracks with striking production and songwriting," with Bieber using his falsetto. "I'll Show You" was considered a "chilled-out EDM ballad," having atmospheric synthesizers, fat bass, snapping trap percussion, and sheets of cascading synths. "What Do You Mean" and "Sorry" were both considered tropical house songs, with the former using "pan flute and piano" while having "hints of dark electropop" dance-pop and the latter having dancehall influences. The album also features the Euro disco, synth-pop and EDM track "Children", the funky disco-pop "Been You" and "Get Used to It", the "airy, dubsteppy" and dark pop "The Feeling"—which Complex described as a "retread of the sad indie pop popularized by artists like Ellie Goulding and Tove Lo"—, as well as "Where Are Ü Now", which initially was a slow piano ballad named "The Most", which is available in its original format on some editions of the album, and was transformed in an EDM track that both Skrillex and Diplo "took a lot of his vocals and [...] added natural harmonies," as well as "taking Justin's vocals as he's singing 'I need you the most' and distorting it," which made people believe it was a "dolphin sound."

In contrast to the dance-oriented songs present on the album, Purpose also features an acoustic pop song, "Love Yourself", which has minimal arrangement, using a guitar and a "brief flurry of trumpets" and folk influence, as well as the piano ballads "Life Is Worth Living" and the title track, "Purpose". Meanwhile, "Company" blends electropop and R&B, and it was compared to Bieber's previous release, Journals (2013). "No Pressure" is a "dreamy" and dark R&B track which features rapper Big Sean, who previously worked with Bieber on Believe's "As Long As You Love Me" and Journals' "Memphis", and has an "elastic guitar riff" and "shimmering, processed acoustic guitar." "No Sense" is a hip-hop tinged track, with bass-riddled synthesizers and influences of trap music, mostly due to Travis Scott's appearance. His rap was noted for being using auto-tune in excess, while Bieber's vocals were compared to those of Justin Timberlake. "We Are" and "Trust" also rely on hip-hop, with the first featuring a "heavy background looping" and the last "sharp production sounds and switches in flow," with a Drake-influence. "Hit the Ground", included on the Walmart and Japanese editions, features "organic shifts in tempo" and "Skrillex's imaginative drop," which was compared to "chip-tune bagpipes."

=== Themes and lyrical content ===
While being asked about the themes on the album in an interview for The Fader, Jason "Poo Bear" Boyd, one of the album's main songwriters, claimed: "It's about keeping in mind and in tune with what's going on with Justin. Just being honest. We really set up for this project to be inspirational. If we talked about a girl, it was something that just happened. Overall, we touch on his personal life like his relationship issues, but at the same time, it's a healthy balance of inspirational music. We're just thinking about making sure that it's not negative, but uplifting. Even the music that talks about his relationships, it's feel-good music. It's nothing that will make you depressed." In an interview for USA Today, Bieber himself declared that the song on the album are "bout growing, being in touch with yourself. What can I say, it's life experiences, and knowing that you can and get back up and keep going. Hope and faith, that's what's gotten me through this too, my faith. What I believe in. You're around some people sometimes and it might taint what you believe. I think that's what happened with me, I lowered my beliefs." When asked about inspirations for the album and if his former girlfriend Selena Gomez inspired him, he admitted: "A lot of my inspiration comes from her. It was a long relationship and a relationship that created heartbreak and created happiness, and a lot of different emotions that I wanted to write about. So there's a lot of that on this album."

=== Songs ===
Purpose was considered by The Guardian's Caroline Sullivan as an album with the songs serving as "a regretful look back and a fresh start." The album's themes were also seen as a "giant apology – to his ex, Selena Gomez, and to his public, for various well-documented misdemeanours." As described by Complex's Sheldon Pearce, "Purpose is, at its core, a formal request for a pardon through music." The album's opening track, "Mark My Words", is a solemn plea, where he promises to "give you all I got," and "let his actions speak louder than his words." In "I'll Show You", an open letter to fans, offers "an autobiographical glimpse into the difficulty of growing up in the public eye." "What Do You Mean?" was described as "self-professed men's anthem for not being able to figure out the opposite sex," while "Sorry" asks "a sincere apology directed to what can be presumed is a former love" in attempt at a course correction. "Love Yourself" was noted for being a "deadpan kiss-off to a snobby ex," with some critics noting, and which was later confirmed, that the real meaning "hidden under the deceptive title 'Love Yourself' is "fuck yourself". "Company", the album's sixth track, "looks forward to getting to know someone attractive, but also sets some healthy boundaries for doing so," while "No Pressure" "invites an ex back into relationship, but insists, 'I don't wanna add to your pain at all', while Big Sean references Yoko Ono, Street Fighter and TV series Empire. The eighth track "No Sense" "talks about sharing a bed with a woman", with Travis Scott rapping "lines about how he misses being 'boo'ed up'."

The ninth track "The Feeling" "touches on questioning the overwhelming and emotional rush of falling in love," with Bieber and Halsey asking themselves: "Am I in love or am I in love with the feeling?." "Life Is Worth Living" finds Bieber "mull[ing] redemption and forgiveness [...] saying that you can crucify him but 'only God can judge me'." According to one of its songwriters, Jason Boyd, "[It's a] positive record that says life is worth living, we're supposed to live. We're supposed to be here. [...] People making mistakes, learning from them, and not letting that be it, but say, 'You know what? I'm not gonna do that again. Life is worth living, I'm not just gonna give up just because I fell. I'm gonna try harder because my life is worth it.' It just has such a positive meaning, I feel like it's gonna save a lot of lives." "Where Are Ü Now" "talks about caring and praying for an ex who didn't return the favor," "Children" has a social consciousness message and "advocates for making the world a better place for its youngest residents" and was unfavorably compared to Michael Jackson's tracks "Man In the Mirror and "Earth Song". The title track, "Purpose", "recounts a time that he was at the end of his rope, but God blessed him with purpose.", and is his second CCM song after "Pray". It ends with a "lengthy voiceover" thoughts about God. "Get Used To It" has "euphemisms about blooming flowers and exploding fireworks," "We Are" features Nas in lines about serendipity and doing yoga," "Trust" talks about "still believing in love", and "All In It" "reflects on trusting God to fill him up inside" and has a spoken outro where he declares that "God is perfect and he never disappoints, so I just get my recognition from Him and give Him my recognition." Justin revealed on The Ellen DeGeneres Show that there are three songs on the album about Gomez—"Mark My Words", "What Do You Mean?" and "Sorry".

== Titling and artwork ==
According to Bieber, he chose the album's title because he felt like he lost his purpose and felt that he finally got his purpose back. He continued: "'The word ['purpose'] is so important in life... My purpose is to inspire people and use my platform to help people'." As noted by MTV News' Patrick Hosken, in the album's cover, "Bieber is shirtless and assuming a very dignified stance, hands meeting in a prayer-like pose, head looking down at what lies at his torso: the word 'Purpose,' written in the same script we first saw [the] week when he unveiled the title." The cover also has a symbol, which "resembl[es] an asymmetrical cross with a small circle attached covering the entire background and painted on his torso." The deluxe edition uses the same cover, only the background & crosses are tinted in black. Purpose was initially banned in various Middle Eastern countries and Indonesia due to the cover art's Christian references, most prominently Bieber's cross tattoo and his praying stance, which were deemed "too provocative". An alternate cover was issued for these countries, depicting Bieber atop of a cliff, looking out over a shore.

== Release and promotion ==
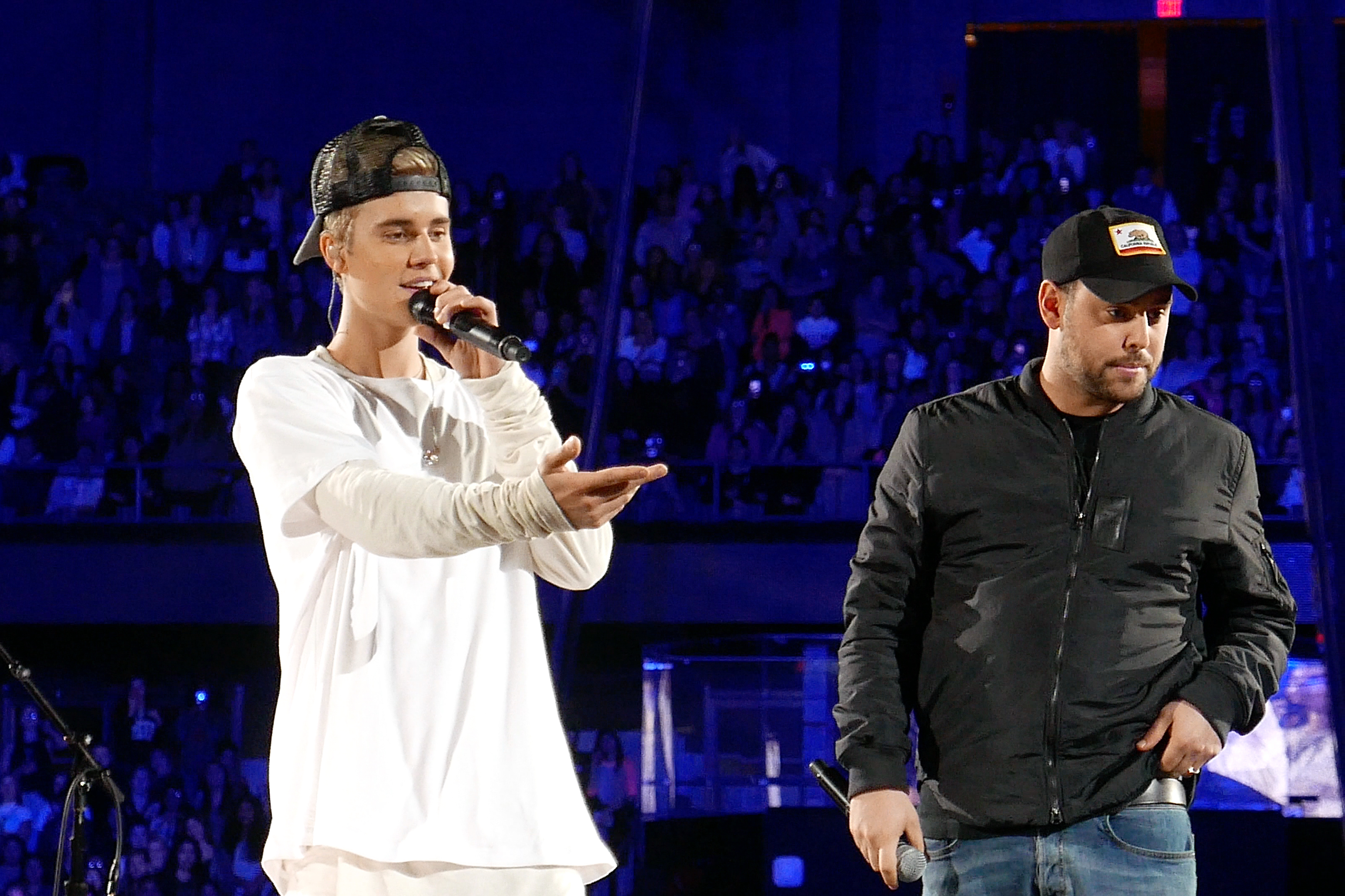
Bieber and manager Scooter Braun (right) during a show to promote Purpose in 2015

In 2015, it was announced that Bieber was going to take his time to announce the album's release, since he was not going to rush an album just to rush an album. During a May 9 Wango Tango interview he revealed: "We're just wrapping it up now so it's in the final-touch stage...it's soon." In a September 2015 interview with Jimmy Fallon, the singer announced the album was going to be released on November 13, 2015. On October 2, 2015, Bieber revealed the album's title, Purpose, on his Twitter account, while on October 9, 2015, he revealed through his Instagram account its cover art made by the street artist Retna. On October 16, 2015, Purpose was made available to pre-order. A remixed version of "What Do You Mean?" with additional vocals from Ariana Grande was made available to those who pre-ordered the album on iTunes. On October 28, 2015, Bieber announced the album track listing through a series of tweets that displayed each title graffitied on a wall in various countries.

To promote the album, Bieber appeared on many magazines, such as Billboard, Complex, Interview Magazine, i-D, and NME. Bieber debuted the track "What Do You Mean?" in a medley with "Where Are Ü Now" during the MTV Video Music Awards on August 30, 2015. This was followed by a number of other televised performances, where he also performed the song during The X Factor Australia World Famous Rooftop, where he also sang 'Hold Tight', "All That Matters", "Boyfriend" and "As Long As You Love Me", The Today Show, where he also performed "Where Are Ü Now", "Boyfriend" "As Long As You Love Me" and "Baby", The Tonight Show Starring Jimmy Fallon, the 2015 Think It Up telecast, the 2015 MTV Europe Music Awards, NRJ Music Awards and BBC Radio 1's Teen Awards, where he also performed "Where Are Ü Now" and "Boyfriend". From November 9, 2015, to November 13, 2015, The Ellen DeGeneres Show hosted a #BieberWeek, where the singer gave interviews, participated of games, pranks, and performed "What Do You Mean?", "Sorry" and "Love Yourself". On November 17, 2015, he returned to the Tonight Show to perform "Sorry", while the next day he returned to Today Show and performed "What Do You Mean?", "Sorry", "Love Yourself", as well as new songs "Company", "The Feeling" with Halsey and "No Pressure" with Big Sean. Bieber also performed a medley of "What Do You Mean?", "Where Are Ü Now" and "Sorry" during the 2015 American Music Awards. Bieber also made a set during Capital FM's Jingle Bell Ball 2015.

=== Purpose: The Movement ===
On November 14, 2015, Bieber released music videos for each track of the standard edition of the album on his Vevo account. The project was considered "a series of video vignettes to accompany the songs from the album" and "when they are played in sequence they form a 30-minute dance film." Mostly videos do not feature Bieber, however they feature several appearances from the album's guests, such as Big Sean, Halsey, Travis Scott, Skrillex and Diplo. The videos were choreographed by Bieber's longtime choreographer Parris Goebel.

=== Tour ===
On November 11, 2015, Bieber announced that he will embark on the Purpose World Tour in support of the album. The tour started in Seattle, Washington on March 9, 2016, and concluded in London, United Kingdom on July 2, 2017.

== Singles ==
"What Do You Mean?" was released as the album's lead single on August 28, 2015. It was preceded by a social media campaign, which started on July 29, 2015, where Bieber "commissioned at least one celebrity per day to hold up a sign teasing the new track and counting down the days to its release." Upon release, the song became Bieber's first number one single on the Billboard Hot 100 chart in the United States, debuting at number one on the week listed on September 19, 2015, replacing The Weeknd's "Can't Feel My Face" for one week. It was also his first number-one single in Australia and the United Kingdom, where he also broke a streaming record, while also topping the charts of other eleven countries. The song's music video features "shirtless Bieber in bed with a young woman" and "getting kidnapped and punching around some masked men", as well as appearance from actor John Leguizamo.

"Sorry" was announced as the album's second single on October 16, 2015. It was released on October 23, 2015. A day before, a music video for the song was released, showing a group of women dancing to the song. The song reached the top of the charts in the United States, remaining at the top for three weeks, as well as the Canadian and the UK charts. Moreover, the single has peaked within the top five in almost every other market, including number one in other six countries.

"Love Yourself" was first premiered on Zane Lowe's Beats 1 radio show and released digitally on November 9, 2015, in advance of the album's release and later announced as the third official single on December 7, 2015. It entered several national charts after the release of Purpose, and topped the charts in eight countries, including Australia, where it remained for seven weeks at the top, Ireland and New Zealand, spending eight weeks at number-one in Ireland and ten weeks at the summit of New Zealand the United Kingdom, where the song spent six weeks at the top, and the United States, becoming his third consecutive number-one single of the album.

"Company" was announced as the album's fourth and final single on February 19, 2016. It was serviced to CHR/Pop stations on March 8, 2016, and was issued to Urban radio on March 29, 2016. The official music video was released on June 8, 2016.

=== Promotional singles and other songs ===
"I'll Show You" was released as the first promotional single on November 1, 2015, accompanied by a music video. It shows Bieber "running through a lush green landscape in Iceland, as well as "tumbling down hills," "skateboarding on top of an abandoned plane" and "[braving] ice water in just his [underwear]." It reached the top-ten in four countries, including Canada, and the top-twenty in six others, including Australia, the United States and the United Kingdom. The album also features Bieber's collaboration with Jack Ü, "Where Are Ü Now", originally released as a single from the latter's album, Skrillex and Diplo Present Jack Ü. It became a top-ten single in more than ten countries, including the United States.

Eight songs from the album charted in the top 40 of the UK Singles Chart the same week that the album was released. They were, in order of chart appearance, "Sorry", "Love Yourself", "What Do You Mean?", "I'll Show You", "Company", "Where Are Ü Now", "Mark My Words" and "The Feeling". Bieber set a record for having the most simultaneous top 40 entries from a living artist. In addition to this, every song from Purpose (standard edition and deluxe edition bonus tracks included) charted within the top 100, also within the same week.

== Critical reception ==
Professional ratings
Aggregate scores
| Source | Rating |
|---|---|
| AnyDecentMusic? | 6.2/10 |
| Metacritic | 63/100 |
Review scores
| Source | Rating |
| AllMusic | 3/5 stars |
| The A.V. Club | C |
| Billboard | 4/5 stars |
| Entertainment Weekly | B+ |
| The Guardian | 3/5 stars |
| NME | 3/5 stars |
| Pitchfork | 6.2/10 |
| Rolling Stone | 3.5/5 stars |
| Slant | 2.5/5 stars |
| Spin | 7/10 |

Purpose received generally favorable reviews from music critics. At Metacritic, which assigns a normalized rating out of 100 to reviews from mainstream critics, the album received an average score of 63, based on 20 reviews. Kenneth Partridge of Billboard magazine gave the album four out of five stars, praising it for "[boasting] a consistent palette of lush, low-key electro-dance sounds", also commending the use of "sun-warped synths, chipmunk accent vocals, rattling trap hi-hats, and loads of bass." Leah Greenblatt of Entertainment Weekly also complimented Purpose for featuring "a skittering, metallic synthesis of dance music and modern R&B", arguing that this new musical direction "probably owes a lot to new-school collaborators Diplo and Skrillex, as well as the lesser-known production wizard Poo Bear." Similarly, Neil McCormick of The Daily Telegraph complimented the album for being "less of a mainstream crowd pleaser" but more of a "quirky, atmospheric electro R'n'B concoction with sci-fi sounds and offbeat vocal samples." He argued that this sound "[focuses] attention on the star's soft, supple and seductive singing" and concluded that "despite the presence of EDM star Skrillex amongst the production credits, surprising restraint is exercised throughout, with tracks rarely developing into full tilt techno anthems."

Spin's Andrew Unterberger praised the album, stating: "[B]y giving us the best album of his career, and subsequently re-ascending to Top 40's mountaintop, Bieber's answered his own question: In pop music, it's never too late to say you’re sorry." Bianca Gracie of Idolator agreed, claiming that the album "is no doubt Justin's best collective LP thus far and shows that he is finally confident in revealing his true artistry. And that is nothing to be sorry about, so keep your needy apologies to yourselves." Patrick Ryan of USA Today praised the "collaborative muscle and confidence" on the album, noting that they show "an artist who is completely unafraid to reinvent himself and create the very definition of a comeback album [...] With Purpose, he proves himself as one of today's most forward-thinking pop stars, and because of that, we're newly converted Beliebers." Al Horner of NME magazine gave the album three out of five stars commenting that Purpose "[is] certainly a start at reinvention" and that "plenty of good choices have been made here." In her review for The Guardian, Caroline Sullivan noted that "the musical direction owes much to co-producer Skrillex, whose unexpectedly subtle electronic palette complements Bieber's affectedly breathy voice," arguing that "the voice soon palls, but the songs are often interesting." While analysing Bieber's Purpose and One Direction's Made in the A.M., Jon Caramanica of The New York Times argued that "even though Mr. Bieber is younger than all of the men of One Direction, he sounds exponentially more experienced, and exponentially more fatigued on Purpose," complimenting the album for showing that it proves that Bieber is "the best singer of the bunch, and the one with a clear vision for his sound, even if he's being largely denied it here." For The National, the album "functions as a coming of age album in the worst way: learn how to emotionally abuse women, and then you’ll be a man," adding "Bieber's strategy is a Janus-faced one. He simultaneously apologises for and doubles down on his dislikeability – but cunningly, now manifests the latter in more socially acceptable ways."

In his AllMusic review, Andy Kellman gave the album 3 out of 5 stars, and while calling it "a bumpy, oddly compelling restart," he observed that "'Purpose' should hook open-minded pop fans who previously paid him no mind, and it could even win back some of those who wrote Bieber off years ago." While providing a generally favorable comment on the album, Brad Nelson of Pitchfork found out that the album "doesn't particularly follow up on the advances suggested by his previous release, the 2013 R&B experiment 'Journals'," while also noting that "[t]he songs on Purpose have a similarly inanimate feeling; they seem to radiate more than they move." Annie Zaleski of The A.V. Club felt that the album "takes itself so seriously that too often it inadvertently suppresses exactly what made Bieber so appealing in the first place." Sam C. Mac of Slant Magazine was more mixed, opining that "[i]f Bieber wants to sell us on forgiveness and the self-improvement angle that lyrics like 'be a better me' seem to promote, maybe having the conviction to follow through on his intended musical reinvention would've been the best possible good faith gesture." For Consequence of Sound editor Janine Schaults, "Purpose reaches some of the highest highs and lowest lows in Bieber's career. Skrillex and Diplo successfully serve up twitchy beats ready to incite anything with a pulse, but the sentiment at the album's core leans toward insufferable. Even when Bieber hits mediocre, he reaches it by stumbling headfirst down a cliff."

=== Year-end lists ===
Purpose was featured on several year-end list of best albums. It was listed at number 15 on Spin's "25 Best Pop Albums of 2015" list, with James Grebey stating: "The 21-year-old's malleable voice (which never lost its halo despite some sinning) has rarely sounded better, especially surrounded by warm tropical beats and thrillingly new-sounding production flourishes."

| Critic/Publication | List | Rank | Ref. |
|---|---|---|---|
| Entertainment Weekly | The 40 Best Albums of 2015 | 17 | |
| Entertainment Weekly | The 10 Best Pop Albums of 2015 | 7 | |
| Fuse | The 20 Best Albums of 2015 | 15 | |
| Rolling Stone | 20 Best Pop Albums of 2015 | 11 | |
| Spin | The 25 Best Pop Albums of 2015 | 15 | |

== Commercial performance ==
In the United States, the competition between Bieber and One Direction began when the British boy band announced the release date of Made in the A.M., set to be their last album before their hiatus in March 2016. Many compared the "war" between the two pop forces to 50 Cent and Kanye West's 2007 battle for number one. However, Bieber's Purpose debuted at number one on the Billboard 200 chart for the week ending November 19, 2015, with 649,000 equivalent album units, including 522,000 traditional album sales. It marked Bieber's sixth number-one album and largest sales week. It also surpassed his previous high, logged with Believe, which sold 374,000 units in 2012. Additionally, Purpose's debut marked the largest weekly unit total for an album since the Billboard 200 began tracking popularity based on overall equivalent units earned in 2014 and beat the debut week of Drake's If You're Reading This It's Too Late (which sold 535,000 equivalent units in 2015). Also, Purpose's 522,000 mark the largest sales week since Taylor Swift's 1989 debuted with 1.29 million (November 2, 2014) and the largest sales for a male artist album since Eminem's The Marshall Mathers LP 2 sold 792,000 (November 3, 2013). Purpose also broke the global and US streaming record for an album in its first week of release with 205 million global streams and 77 million in the United States. In its second week, Purpose earned 290,000 units (down 55%). It sold 184,000 in traditional album sales (down 65%) and was beaten to the top by Adele's 25, which debuted at number one with a record-breaking 3.38 million. In December 2015, the album surpassed the 1 million mark in US sales, becoming Bieber's fifth million-selling album. Also, on this exact date, specifically December 5, 2015, every song on Purpose (even the deluxe version) had entered the Billboard Hot 100, except for "All In It". Eventually, the album was announced as the third best-selling album of 2015 in the US, with sales of 1,269,000 copies. As of December 2016, "Purpose" has sold 1.812 million copies in the nation.

Purpose debuted at number 2 on the UK Albums Chart, selling 90,596 in its first week, marking the second highest first-week figures of 2015, at the time, behind One Direction's Made in the A.M. (2015), which debuted at number one the same week with 93,189 chart sales. In its second and third week on sale it stayed at number three. Purpose was the fifth best-selling album of 2015 in the UK with combined sales of 645,000 copies. As of June 2016, the album has accumulated 1,200,000 combined sales in the UK.

== Track listing ==
Purpose track listing
| No. | Title | Writer(s) | Producer(s) | Length |
|---|---|---|---|---|
| 1. | "Mark My Words" | Justin Bieber; Michael Tucker; Jason Boyd; Rodney Jerkins; James Abrahart; Fredrik Halland | BloodPop | 2:14 |
| 2. | "I'll Show You" | Bieber; Tucker; Sonny Moore; Theron Feemster; Joshua Gudwin | BloodPop; Skrillex | 3:19 |
| 3. | "What Do You Mean?" | Bieber; Boyd; Mason Levy | MdL; Bieber^{[a]} | 3:25 |
| 4. | "Sorry" | Bieber; Tucker; Moore; Justin Tranter; Julia Michaels | BloodPop; Skrillex | 3:20 |
| 5. | "Love Yourself" | Bieber; Benjamin Levin; Ed Sheeran | Benny Blanco | 3:53 |
| 6. | "Company" | Bieber; Andreas Schuller; James Wong; Leroy Clampitt; Boyd; Abrahart; Thomas Troelsen | Axident; Gladius; Big Taste; Poo Bear^{[a]} | 3:28 |
| 7. | "No Pressure" (featuring Big Sean) | Bieber; Sean Anderson; Dominic Jordan; Jimmy Giannos; Boyd | The Audibles; Poo Bear | 4:46 |
| 8. | "No Sense" (featuring Travis Scott) | Bieber; Jacques Webster II; Kenneth Coby; Michael Dean; Boyd | Soundz; Dean^{[a]} | 4:35 |
| 9. | "The Feeling" (featuring Halsey) | Bieber; Ashley Frangipane; Moore; Ian Kirkpatrick; Sarah Hudson; Michaels; Clarence Coffee, Jr. | Skrillex; Kirkpatrick | 4:04 |
| 10. | "Life Is Worth Living" | Bieber; Boyd; Mark Jackson | The Mogul; Bieber^{[a]} | 3:54 |
| 11. | "Where Are Ü Now" (with Jack Ü) | Bieber; Moore; Thomas Pentz; Boyd; Jordan Ware; Karl Rubin Brutus | Skrillex; Diplo | 4:02 |
| 12. | "Children" | Bieber; Boyd; Tucker; Moore; Brandon Green; Nico Hartikainen | BloodPop; Skrillex; Maejor; Hartikainen | 3:43 |
| 13. | "Purpose" | Bieber; Boyd; Stephen Philibin; Jeremy Snyder; James Artissen; Scott Braun; Eben Wares | Poo Bear; Steve James^{[a]}; Snyder^{[a]} | 3:30 |
| Total length: | | | | 48:13 |

Deluxe edition bonus tracks
| No. | Title | Writer(s) | Producer(s) | Length |
|---|---|---|---|---|
| 14. | "Been You" | Bieber; Boyd; Josh Abraham; Oliver Goldstein; Green; Saul Vasquez | Abraham; Oligee; Maejor^{[a]}; A.C.^{[a]} | 3:19 |
| 15. | "Get Used to It" | Bieber; Boyd; Abraham; Hartikainen; Green; Vasquez; Gudwin; Ely Weisfield | Abraham; Hartikainen; Maejor^{[a]}; A.C.^{[a]} | 3:58 |
| 16. | "We Are" (featuring Nas) | Bieber; Nasir Jones; Andre Harris; Boyd; Donovan Knight | Harris; Poo Bear; DK The Punisher^{[a]} | 3:22 |
| 17. | "Trust" | Bieber; Boyd; Jackson | The Mogul; DJ Tay James^{[a]} | 3:23 |
| 18. | "All in It" | Bieber; Boyd; Jackson; Levy; Gudwin | The Mogul; MdL^{[a]}; Gudwin^{[a]} | 3:51 |
| Total length: | | | | 66:06 |

Walmart edition bonus tracks
| No. | Title | Writer(s) | Producer(s) | Length |
|---|---|---|---|---|
| 19. | "Hit the Ground" | Bieber; Moore; Andrew Wotman; Louis Bell; Brian Lee; Boyd; Tucker | Skrillex; Watt^{[a]}; Bell^{[a]} | 3:48 |
| 20. | "The Most" | Bieber; Boyd; Wallace Joseph; Ware; Brutus | Ware; Brutus | 3:20 |
| Total length: | | | | 73:14 |

Notes

- ^{^[a]} signifies a co-producer.
- "Get Used to It" was mislabeled as "Get Used to Me" on early CD pressings.
- Spotify edition includes the acoustic version of What Do You Mean? as a bonus track.
- iTunes Store edition includes a remix version of "What Do You Mean" with Ariana Grande as a bonus track. The bonus track was later added to all Apple Music editions.
- Japanese CD edition and the Purpose + Super Hits Japanese limited edition reissue include the standalone single "Home to Mama" with Cody Simpson on disc 1 as a bonus track.
- Purpose + Super Hits Japanese limited edition reissue also includes the singles "Let Me Love You", "Cold Water", "Deja Vu", where Bieber is a featured artist, as well as the acoustic version of "What Do You Mean?" on disc 2 as bonus tracks.
- Japanese CD+DVD edition includes a bonus DVD which features the music, and lyric video of "What Do You Mean?".

== Personnel ==
Adapted from AllMusic and album's liner notes.

- A.C. – co-producer (tracks 14, 15)
- Korey Aaron – assistant engineer (tracks 8, 10)
- Josh Abraham – producer (tracks 14, 15)
- Henrique Andrade – assistant engineer (tracks 2–4, 9, 10, 12, 14, 15, 17, 18), additional engineering (tracks 4, 5), mixing assistant (tracks 3, 6)
- Axident – producer (track 6)
- Jennifer Beal – package production
- Philip Beaudreau – trumpet (track 5)
- Justin Bieber – executive producer, lead vocals, co-producer (tracks 3, 10)
- Big Sean – featured artist (track 7)
- Big Taste – producer (track 6)
- Benny Blanco – producer, instrumentation, and programming (track 5)
- Blood – producer (tracks 1, 2, 4, 12)
- Jason "Poo Bear" Boyd – producer (tracks 7, 13, 16), co-producer (track 6), backing vocals (track 18)
- Scott "Scooter" Braun – executive producer, producer
- Chris Burkard – photography
- Maddox Chhim – mixing assistant (tracks 7, 17)
- Leroy Clampitt – bass guitar (track 6)
- Simon Cohen – engineer (track 5)
- Josh Connolly – additional engineering (track 7)
- Tom Coyne – mastering
- Thomas Cullison – assistant engineer (track 16)
- Mike Dean – co-producer (track 8)
- Diplo – featured artist, producer, and mixing (track 11)
- DK the Punisher – co-producer (track 16)
- Theron "Neff-U" Feemster – piano (tracks 10, 13)
- Chris Galland – mixing assistant (tracks 10, 14, 15)
- Jimmy Giannos – producer and keyboards (track 7)
- Gladius – producer (track 6)
- Mark "Exit" Goodchild – rap engineer (tracks 8, 16), additional rap engineering (track 7)
- Nikos Goudinakis – assistant engineer (track 17)
- Josh Gudwin – co-producer and guitar (track 18), engineer (tracks 1–10, 12–18), mixing (tracks 1–6, 12, 13, 16, 18), vocal engineer (track 11), vocal mixing (track 17)
- Halsey – featured artist (track 9)
- Brandon Harding – mixing assistant (tracks 2, 4, 6, 16, 18)
- Andre Harris – producer (track 16)
- Nico Hartikainen – producer (tracks 12, 15)
- Seif "Mageef" Hussain – production coordination (track 5)
- Mark "the Mogul" Jackson – producer (tracks 10, 17, 18), piano (track 10)
- Samuel Jacquet – additional engineering (track 7)
- Steve James – producer (track 13)
- DJ Tay James – co-producer (track 17)
- Jaycen Joshua – mixing (tracks 7, 8, 17)
- Dominic Jordan – producer and drums (track 7)
- Ryan Kaul – mixing assistant (tracks 7, 17)
- Ian Kirkpatrick – producer (track 9)
- Mason "MdL" Levy – producer (track 3), co-producer (track 18)
- Andrew Luftman – production coordination (track 5)
- Maejor – producer (track 12), co-producer (tracks 14, 15)
- Manny Marroquin – mixing (tracks 10, 14, 15)
- Randy Merrill – mastering
- Julia Michaels – background vocals (tracks 3, 9)
- Zeke Mishanec – assistant engineer (tracks 1, 6), mixing assistant (tracks 1, 12)
- Nas – featured artist (track 16)
- Chris "Tek" O'Ryan – additional engineering (tracks 2–10, 13–15, 18), vocal engineer (track 11)
- Oligee – producer (track 14)
- Teddy Photo – background vocals (track 5)
- Jimmy Powers – guitar (track 7)
- Andy Proctor – package production
- Johannes Raassina – engineer (tracks 3, 13, 18)
- Usher Raymond IV – executive producer
- Todd Robinson – assistant engineer (track 16)
- David Rodríguez – assistant vocal engineer (track 9)
- Gregg Rominiecki – rap engineer (track 7)
- Jon Schacter – assistant engineer (tracks 3, 13), assistant rap engineer (track 8)
- Bart Schoudel – additional engineering (track 9)
- Andreas Schuller – percussion (track 6)
- Ike Schultz – mixing assistant (tracks 10, 14, 15)
- Chris Sclafani – engineer (track 5)
- Travis Scott – featured artist (track 8)
- Josh Sellers – assistant rap engineer (track 16)
- Jessica Severn – graphic design, packaging
- Sasha Sirota – bass (track 7)
- Skrillex – featured artist (track 11), producer (tracks 2, 4, 9, 11, 12), mixing (tracks 9, 11)
- Jeremy Snyder – co-producer (track 13)
- Soundz – producer (track 8)
- Derrick Stockwell – mixing assistant (track 5)
- Trevon Trapper – background vocals (track 3)
- Dylan William – vocal engineer (track 9)
- James Wong – guitar (track 6)
- Andrew Wuepper – mixing (tracks 2, 4, 6, 12, 16, 18)

== Charts ==
=== Weekly charts ===
| Chart (2015–2016) | Peak position |
|---|---|
| Australian Albums (ARIA) | 1 |
| Austrian Albums (Ö3 Austria) | 3 |
| Belgian Albums (Ultratop Flanders) | 2 |
| Belgian Albums (Ultratop Wallonia) | 6 |
| Brazilian Albums (ABPD) | 1 |
| Canadian Albums (Billboard) | 1 |
| Croatian Albums (HDU) | 4 |
| Czech Albums (ČNS IFPI) | 5 |
| Danish Albums (Hitlisten) | 1 |
| Dutch Albums (Album Top 100) | 1 |
| Finnish Albums (Suomen virallinen lista) | 4 |
| French Albums (SNEP) | 8 |
| German Albums (Offizielle Top 100) | 3 |
| Greek Albums (IFPI Greece) | 5 |
| Hungarian Albums (MAHASZ) | 10 |
| Irish Albums (IRMA) | 1 |
| Italian Albums (FIMI) | 2 |
| Japanese Albums (Oricon) | 7 |
| Mexican Albums (AMPROFON) | 2 |
| New Zealand Albums (RMNZ) | 1 |
| Norwegian Albums (VG-lista) | 1 |
| Polish Albums (ZPAV) | 4 |
| Portuguese Albums (AFP) | 2 |
| Scottish Albums (Official Charts) | 2 |
| Slovak Albums (ČNS IFPI) | 16 |
| South African Albums (RISA) | 4 |
| South Korean International Albums (Circle) Deluxe version | 5 |
| Spanish Albums (Promusicae) | 2 |
| Swedish Albums (Sverigetopplistan) | 1 |
| Swiss Albums (Schweizer Hitparade) | 1 |
| UK Albums (Official Charts) | 2 |
| US Billboard 200 | 1 |

=== Monthly charts ===
| Chart (2015) | Peak position |
|---|---|
| Argentine Monthly Albums (CAPIF) | 3 |

=== Year-end charts ===
| Chart (2015) | Position |
|---|---|
| Australian Albums (ARIA) | 4 |
| Austrian Albums (Ö3 Austria) | 42 |
| Belgian Albums (Ultratop Flanders) | 29 |
| Belgian Albums (Ultratop Wallonia) | 78 |
| Brazilian Albums (ABPD) | 11 |
| Croatian Foreign Albums (HDU) | 47 |
| Danish Albums (Hitlisten) | 7 |
| Dutch Albums (MegaCharts) | 4 |
| French Albums (SNEP) | 90 |
| German Albums (Offizielle Top 100) | 51 |
| Hungarian Albums (MAHASZ) | 93 |
| Irish Albums (IRMA) | 4 |
| Italian Albums (FIMI) | 36 |
| Japanese Albums (Billboard Japan) | 59 |
| Mexican Albums (AMPROFON) | 7 |
| New Zealand Albums (RMNZ) | 8 |
| Spanish Albums (PROMUSICAE) | 25 |
| Swedish Albums (Sverigetopplistan) | 4 |
| Swiss Albums (Schweizer Hitparade) | 47 |
| UK Albums (OCC) | 5 |

| Chart (2016) | Position |
|---|---|
| Australian Albums (ARIA) | 9 |
| Austrian Albums (Ö3 Austria) | 55 |
| Belgian Albums (Ultratop Flanders) | 20 |
| Belgian Albums (Ultratop Wallonia) | 63 |
| Canadian Albums (Billboard) | 2 |
| Danish Albums (Hitlisten) | 1 |
| Dutch Albums (MegaCharts) | 2 |
| French Albums (SNEP) | 38 |
| German Albums (Offizielle Top 100) | 41 |
| Icelandic Albums (Plötutíóindi) | 3 |
| Italian Albums (FIMI) | 46 |
| Japanese Albums (Billboard Japan) | 26 |
| Mexican Albums (AMPROFON) | 18 |
| New Zealand Albums (RMNZ) | 2 |
| Polish Albums (ZPAV) | 63 |
| Spanish Albums (PROMUSICAE) | 24 |
| Swedish Albums (Sverigetopplistan) | 1 |
| Swiss Albums (Schweizer Hitparade) | 26 |
| UK Albums (OCC) | 4 |
| US Billboard 200 | 3 |

| Chart (2017) | Position |
|---|---|
| Australian Albums (ARIA) | 38 |
| Canadian Albums (Billboard) | 38 |
| Danish Albums (Hitlisten) | 10 |
| Dutch Albums (MegaCharts) | 19 |
| Icelandic Albums (Plötutíóindi) | 30 |
| Italian Albums (FIMI) | 94 |
| Japanese Albums (Billboard Japan) | 34 |
| Mexican Albums (AMPROFON) | 95 |
| New Zealand Albums (RMNZ) | 14 |
| Swedish Albums (Sverigetopplistan) | 26 |
| UK Albums (OCC) | 71 |
| US Billboard 200 | 68 |

| Chart (2018) | Position |
|---|---|
| Australian Albums (ARIA) | 62 |
| Danish Albums (Hitlisten) | 27 |
| Dutch Albums (MegaCharts) | 49 |
| Icelandic Albums (Plötutíóindi) | 85 |
| Swedish Albums (Sverigetopplistan) | 73 |
| US Billboard 200 | 157 |

| Chart (2019) | Position |
|---|---|
| Danish Albums (Hitlisten) | 53 |
| Dutch Albums (Album Top 100) | 64 |

| Chart (2020) | Position |
|---|---|
| Belgian Albums (Ultratop Flanders) | 168 |
| Danish Albums (Hitlisten) | 55 |

| Chart (2021) | Position |
|---|---|
| Danish Albums (Hitlisten) | 58 |

| Chart (2022) | Position |
|---|---|
| Danish Albums (Hitlisten) | 75 |

| Chart (2023) | Position |
|---|---|
| Danish Albums (Hitlisten) | 80 |

| Chart (2024) | Position |
|---|---|
| Belgian Albums (Ultratop Flanders) | 167 |
| Danish Albums (Hitlisten) | 91 |
| Portuguese Albums (AFP) | 159 |

| Chart (2025) | Position |
|---|---|
| Belgian Albums (Ultratop Flanders) | 153 |

=== Decade-end charts ===
| Chart (2010–2019) | Position |
|---|---|
| Australian Albums (ARIA) | 22 |
| UK Albums (OCC) | 23 |
| US Billboard 200 | 52 |

== Certifications and sales ==
| Region | Certification | Certified units/sales |
|---|---|---|
| Australia (ARIA) | 5× Platinum | 350,000^{‡} |
| Austria (IFPI Austria) | 4× Platinum | 60,000^{*} |
| Belgium (BRMA) | Gold | 15,000^{*} |
| Canada (Music Canada) | 9× Platinum | 720,000^{‡} |
| Denmark (IFPI Danmark) | 11× Platinum | 220,000^{‡} |
| Germany (BVMI) | 3× Gold | 300,000^{‡} |
| Hungary (MAHASZ) | Gold | 1,000^{^} |
| Iceland (FHF) | — | 2,738 |
| Italy (FIMI) | 2× Platinum | 100,000^{‡} |
| Japan (RIAJ) | Gold | 100,000^{^} |
| Mexico (AMPROFON) | Diamond+2× Platinum | 420,000^{‡} |
| New Zealand (RMNZ) | 10× Platinum | 150,000^{‡} |
| Norway (IFPI Norway) | 7× Platinum | 140,000^{‡} |
| Poland (ZPAV) | 3× Platinum | 60,000^{‡} |
| Portugal (AFP) | Platinum | 7,000^{‡} |
| Singapore (RIAS) | 3× Platinum | 30,000^{*} |
| Spain (Promusicae) | Platinum | 40,000^{‡} |
| Sweden (GLF) | 3× Platinum | 120,000^{‡} |
| United Kingdom (BPI) | 5× Platinum | 1,500,000^{‡} |
| United States (RIAA) | 6× Platinum | 6,000,000^{‡} |
^{*} Sales figures based on certification alone.^{^} Shipments figures based on certification alone.^{‡} Sales+streaming figures based on certification alone.

== Release history ==
| Country | Date | Edition | Format | Label | Ref. |
|---|---|---|---|---|---|
| Australia | November 13, 2015 | Standard | CD | Universal | |
| Japan | November 13, 2015 | Standard; deluxe | CD; CD+DVD | Universal | |
| United States | November 13, 2015 | Standard; deluxe | digital download; streaming; LP; CD | Def Jam; RBMG | |
| Canada | November 27, 2015 | Standard | LP | Universal | |
| United Kingdom | October 14, 2016 | Standard | Cassette | Virgin EMI | |
