= I'll Show You (Justin Bieber song) =

Promotional single by Justin Bieber

from the album Purpose
- Released: November 2, 2015
- Recorded: 2015
- Genre: Pop; EDM
- Length: 3:19
- Label: Def Jam
- Songwriters: Justin Bieber; Michael Tucker; Sonny Moore; Theron Feemster; Joshua Gudwin
- Producers: BloodPop; Skrillex

Justin Bieber promotional singles chronology
"Die in Your Arms" (2012)	"I'll Show You" (2015)	"Get Me" (2020)

Music video
- "I'll Show You" on YouTube

"I'll Show You" is a song recorded by Canadian singer Justin Bieber for his fourth studio album Purpose (2015). Written by Bieber, Josh Gudwin, Sonny Moore, Michael Tucker and Theron Feemster, the song was produced by Skrillex and Blood. It was released as a promotional single from the album on November 2, 2015, by Def Jam. A mid-tempo Electronic pop ballad, the song includes trap percussion and synthesizer beds as its main instrumentation. Bieber's vocals on the track were considered emotional, lower, and calmer. Lyrically, "I'll Show You" was considered an autobiographical song about his public image, with lyrics about the pressure of fame and the need for human connection.

The song received acclaim from most music critics, who praised Skrillex's production and his chemistry with Bieber, while also noting his rawness and praising his vocals on the track. Commercially, the song was successful, reaching the top-ten in seven countries, including his native Canada, as well as the top-twenty in another six, including Australia, the United Kingdom, and the United States where it received platinum certification by the Recording Industry Association of America. The song's music video was shot in South Iceland and released on November 2, 2015. It shows Bieber on lush mountainsides, gazing at nature from a cliff's edge, and skateboarding on top of a broken-down airplane. "I'll Show You" was included on his Purpose World Tour.

== Background and release ==
While working on his then-upcoming studio album, Justin Bieber enlisted American DJ Skrillex to produce songs for the record after successfully working with him on "Where Are Ü Now", which was a song that he sent to Skrillex and Diplo for their project Jack Ü and that became a worldwide hit and helped to revamp his career. Regarding his will to work with the producer, Bieber commented: "Skrillex is a genius. He’s super futuristic and I just love his sounds. I think being able to incorporate that sound with what I’m doing has been super cool because it’s like new and fresh, and I feel like no one’s done it before." Skrillex, on the other hand, commented about his involvement on the album, saying: "I heard some well-written songs that were really good that they wanted me to do production on and from there, we wrote some new songs. It was an opportunity to try some stuff that I had never done before and we ended up making something really unique." Skrillex also invited Michael Tucker, under his producer name Blood, to help him produce some tracks for the album, with one of them being "I'll Show You". Regarding the song, Skrillex commented: "There was a very different version of that track, and after I heard it I wanted to re-produce it so it was more slowed down and emotional. That track is one of my favourites on the album. It has some of the best lyrics on the album. That was one of the songs that he [Bieber] really liked, and we were both proud of." It was later released as a promotional single from the album on November 1, 2015.

== Composition ==
"I'll Show You" was written by Justin Bieber, Josh Gudwin, Sonny Moore, Michael Tucker and Theron Feemster, with production being done by Skrillex and Blood. According to the sheet music published at Musicnotes.com by Universal Music Publishing Group, the song is composed in the key of A minor with a tempo of 100 beats per minute. Bieber's vocals range from the note of E_{4} to E_{5}. The song is a "chilled-out EDM" ballad," having "shadowy R&B atmospheric synthesizers," a trap percussion line and thick beds of synthesizers. For Bianca Gracie of Idolator, "[the] brooding tune picks up where the R&B-flecked 'Journals' left off," while Carolyn Menyes of Music Times noticed that the song is "notably more down-tempo than his previously released Purpose cuts 'What Do You Mean?' and 'Sorry.'" During the track, Bieber uses a "suave yet hurt croon", as well as "lower, calmer, sturdier, and delicately cradled by Skrillex's glass-case-of-emotion production," having an emotional, rich, deep tone."

Lyrically, "I'll Show You" offers an autobiographical glimpse into the difficulty of growing up in the public eye and the need for human connection. During the opening lines, "My life is a movie, and everyone’s watching," he "underlin[es] his typical braggadocio with insecurity and quiet paranoia." Menyes noted that the song has "introspective" lyrics, "go[ing] a little bit deeper into his struggles with depression and his public image," which can be seen on the pre-chorus: "Sometimes it's hard to do the right thing / When the pressure's coming down like lightning / It's like they want me to be perfect / When they don't even know that I'm hurting." The chorus "reveals his lamentations as a setup for his ashes-rising," with Bieber singing: "This life’s not easy/ I’m not made out of steel/ Don’t you forget that I’m human/ Don’t forget that I’m real/ Act like you know me, but you never will / But there’s one thing that I know for sure / I’ll show you." In the second part, he meditates on his maturation in the public spotlight, explaining that his many scandals were all part of learning "the hard way."

== Critical reception ==
The song received acclaim from music critics. Andrew Unterberger of Spin praised the "Skrillex’s glass-case-of-emotion production" calling it "a waterfall of gorgeous Skrillex synths," adding: "It’s as electric a moment as you’ll hear in pop this year." Unterberger also noted that the song shows that "Bieber’s far more concerned about rekindling his relationship with the general public." Sam C. Mac of Slant Magazine opined that the song "takes an Owl City-worthy ballad and beefs it up [...] completing 2015's most empirically perfect singles rollout." Caroline Sullivan of The Guardian noted that the song "is drenched in icy reverb," while Bianca Gracie of Idolator pointed out that "[i]t is Bieber in his rawest form." Annie Zaleski of The A.V. Club praised Skrillex's production for "inject[ing] life into 'Purpose', citing the " tropical-forest electro mist" song as an example. Carolyn Menyes of Music Times observed that "the lightness and vulnerability in Bieber's vocals help to balance that out and bring in a human element." Amy Davidson of Digital Spy declared that "there's something poignant about his pleas to restore a sense of humanity around him." Alex Macpherson of The National called it "all languid, stretched-out bass until an oddly weedy synth riff hoves into earshot to function as the hook." Michelle Geslani of Consequence of Sound commend Bieber and Srkillex for "continu[ing] to show off their musical chemistry with 'I’ll Show You'," observing that "Skrillex provides the perfect backdrop for Bieber's suave yet hurt croon." Janine Schaults of the same publication was positive with Bieber's "creamy" voice, declaring that it "begs for sympathy in a way that simultaneously makes you feel sorry for Bieber's lost childhood and repulsed by his blindness to his own immense privilege."

== Chart performance ==
"I'll Show You" proved to be very successful for a promotional single. In Bieber's native country, Canada, the song debuted at number twenty-eight, before climbing to number fifteen in its second week. It later peaked at number eight a week later. In the United States, the song debuted at number 51 on the Billboard Hot 100, selling 52,000 copies, which also made it start at number 17 on Digital Songs. After the video's release, the song climbed to number 27, while during its third week, after the album's release, the song jumped to number 19, becoming his fourteenth top-twenty song. It was later certified platinum by the Recording Industry Association of America for selling over a million copies. In the United Kingdom, the song peaked at number 15, becoming his eleventh solo top-twenty song. In Denmark, the Netherlands, New Zealand and Norway, the song managed to reach the top-ten, while in Australia, Ireland and Sweden the song was able to reach the top-twenty.

== Music video ==
A music video for the song was released on November 2, 2015, and it was directed by Rory Kramer. It features glacial lagoons and rivers in South Iceland, including the waterfalls Seljalandsfoss and Skógafoss. The video features Bieber "running through lush, green mountains, sitting on the edge of a cliff, rolling down hills and skateboarding on top of a derelict airplane." There's also a scene where Bieber is "[braving] ice water in just his [underwear]." Billboard considered it "a beautiful clip full of nature's glory."

== Credits and personnel ==
Recording and management

- Recorded and mixed at Record Plant Studios (Hollywood, California)
- Mastered at Sterling Sound Studios (New York City)
- Published by Bieber Time Publishing/Universal Music (ASCAP), Yeshua the Gudwin Admin by Songs of Kobalt Music Publishing (BMI), Sonny Moore/Copaface (ASCAP), Michael Diamond Music, Kobalt Songs Music Publishing o/b/o OWSLA TRAX, These Are Songs of Pulse (ASCAP), and Feemstro Adm. by Universal Music – Z Tunes LLC (ASCAP)

Personnel

- Justin Bieber – lead vocals, songwriter
- Josh Gudwin – songwriter, recording, mixing
- Skrillex – songwriter, producer
- Blood – songwriter, producer
- Theron "Neff-U" Feemster – songwriter
- Andrew Wuepper – mixing
- Chris "Tek" O'Ryan – additional engineering
- Tom Coyne – mastering
- Randy Merrill – mastering
- Brandon Harding – mix assistant
- Henrique Andrade – record assistant

Credits adapted from Purpose album liner notes.

== Charts ==
Chart (2015–2016)	Peak position
Australia (ARIA)	16
Austria (Ö3 Austria Top 40)	35
Belgium (Ultratop 50 Flanders)	38
Belgium (Ultratop 50 Wallonia)	41
Canada Hot 100 (Billboard)	8
Czech Republic Singles Digital (ČNS IFPI)	10
Denmark (Tracklisten)	8
France (SNEP)	57
Germany (GfK)	45
Hungary (Single Top 40)	13
Hungary (Stream Top 40)	16
Ireland (IRMA)	14
Italy (FIMI)	28
Netherlands (Single Top 100)	7
New Zealand (Recorded Music NZ)	5
Norway (VG-lista)	9
Portugal (AFP)	22
Slovakia Singles Digital (ČNS IFPI)	4
South Korea International Chart (Gaon)	83
Spain (Promusicae)	22
Sweden (Sverigetopplistan)	12
Switzerland (Schweizer Hitparade)	40
UK Singles (Official Charts)	15
US Billboard Hot 100	19

== Certifications ==
Region	Certification	Certified units/sales
Australia (ARIA)	Platinum	70,000^{‡}
Brazil (Pro-Música Brasil)	Diamond	250,000^{‡}
Canada (Music Canada)	Platinum	80,000^{‡}
Denmark (IFPI Danmark)	Platinum	90,000^{‡}
Italy (FIMI)	Gold	25,000^{‡}
New Zealand (RMNZ)	Platinum	15,000^{*}
Norway (IFPI Norway)	Platinum	60,000^{‡}
Poland (ZPAV)	Platinum	20,000^{‡}
Sweden (GLF)	Platinum	40,000^{‡}
United Kingdom (BPI)	Gold	400,000^{‡}
United States (RIAA)	Platinum	1,000,000^{‡}
^{*} Sales figures based on certification alone.^{‡} Sales+streaming figures based on certification alone.

== Release history ==
Country	Date	Format	Label	Ref
Worldwide	November 1, 2015	Digital download	Def Jam	
