= Home to Mama =

Single by Justin Bieber and Cody Simpson
- Released: November 11, 2014
- Recorded: 2014
- Genre: Pop
- Length: 3:23
- Songwriters: Justin Bieber; Cody Simpson; Tom Strahle; Luke Howell; Josh Gudwin; Andrew Watt
- Producers: Tom Strahle; Josh Gudwin

Justin Bieber singles chronology
"Foreign" (remix) (2014)	"Home to Mama" (2014)	"Where Are Ü Now" (2015)

Cody Simpson singles chronology
"Surfboard" (2014)	"Home to Mama" (2014)	"Flower" (2015)

"Home to Mama" is a song by Canadian singer Justin Bieber and Australian singer Cody Simpson credited as JB X CS (referring to their initials). The song appears only in the Japan edition of Bieber's fourth studio album Purpose.

== Background ==
Ever since Simpson made his mainstream debut in 2010 with iYiYi he received many comparisons towards Bieber and was often dubbed as "The next Justin Bieber". Simpson was questioned in September, 2010 if he had ever met Bieber, to which he confirmed yes, whilst also proclaiming to be a big fan of Bieber's music. Simpson also responded to a number of fan questions through J-14 Magazine that same month, one of which asked if he would ever duet with Bieber, to which he responded: ″Maybe I guess, that would be kinda cool″. Simpson hired Bieber's manager Scooter Braun as his own in 2011.

In January, 2012, during the making process of Bieber's third studio album Believe, it was confirmed that Simpson had been in the studio with Bieber, proclaimed via Twitter by Simpson, ″Chilled with the mate @justinbieber in the studio tonight. Look for some great records coming″, hinting the possibility of a duet. Despite rumours, Bieber confirmed there was not a collaboration with Simpson on his album, but hinted the possibility of Kanye and Drake.

Over the summer of 2014, Simpson tweeted that he was in the studio with Bieber, stating that they wrote a "beautiful guitar track".

== Charts ==
Chart (2014–15)	Peak position
Norway (VG-lista)	21
Sweden (Sverigetopplistan)	57
Netherlands (Single Top 100)	42

== Certifications ==
Region	Certification	Certified units/sales
Denmark (IFPI Danmark)	Gold	30,000^{^}
^{^} Shipments figures based on certification alone.
