= List of Billboard Hot 100 top-ten singles in 2016 =

This is a list of singles that charted in the top ten of the Billboard Hot 100, an all-genre singles chart, in 2016.

Five songs which charted in the top ten during 2016 spent at least 20 total weeks in that region of the chart: Drake's "One Dance" (featuring Wizkid and Kyla); Justin Bieber's "Sorry" and "Love Yourself"; and The Chainsmokers' "Don't Let Me Down" (featuring Daya) and "Closer" (featuring Halsey). Since "Closer" spent 32 weeks in the top ten it was tied with "How Do I Live" by LeAnn Rimes for the most weeks in the top ten since the chart's inception in 1958. This record was broken in September 2017 when Ed Sheeran's "Shape Of You" got 33 weeks in the top 10. Both Bieber and Drake are tied with the most top-ten hits during the year, with five. Selena Gomez, Twenty One Pilots, The Chainsmokers and Rihanna follow them with three.

== Top-ten singles ==
Key

- ↑ – indicates single's top 10 entry was also its Hot 100 debut
- † – indicates Best performing song of the year
- (#) – 2016 year-end top 10 single position and rank
- The "weeks in top ten" column reflects each song's entire chart life, not just its run during 2016. (Exception: Please see the note below regarding Prince's two songs that recharted in the top ten.)

List of Billboard Hot 100 top ten singles which peaked in 2016
Top ten entry date	Single	Artist(s)	Peak	Peak date	Weeks in top ten	References
Singles from 2015
November 14	"Sorry" (#2) ↑	Justin Bieber	1	January 23	21	
December 5	"Love Yourself" † ^{[E]} (#1) ↑	Justin Bieber	1	February 13	24	
December 5	"Here"	Alessia Cara	5	February 6	11	
December 19	"Same Old Love"	Selena Gomez	5	January 30	9	
Singles from 2016
January 16	"Stressed Out" (#5)	Twenty One Pilots	2	February 27	14	
February 6	"Roses"	The Chainsmokers featuring Rozes	6	February 13	6	
February 13	"My House"	Flo Rida	4	March 19	11	
February 13	"Hands to Myself"	Selena Gomez	7	February 13	1	
February 13	"Work" (#4) ↑	Rihanna featuring Drake	1	March 5	18	
February 20	"Pillowtalk" ↑	Zayn	1	February 20	16	
February 20	"Summer Sixteen" ↑	Drake	6	February 20	1	
February 20	"Me, Myself & I"	G-Eazy and Bebe Rexha	7	March 12	12	
March 5	"Cake by the Ocean"^{[C]}	DNCE	9	March 12	7	
March 19	"Piece by Piece" ↑	Kelly Clarkson	8	March 19	1	
March 19	"7 Years"	Lukas Graham	2	April 9	15	
March 26	"I Took a Pill in Ibiza"^{[B]}	Mike Posner	4	May 21	14	
April 2	"Dangerous Woman"^{[F]} ↑	Ariana Grande	8	June 11	2	
April 9	"No"	Meghan Trainor	3	April 16	5	
April 16	"Work from Home"	Fifth Harmony featuring Ty Dolla Sign	4	June 11	15	
April 23	"Panda" (#6)	Desiigner	1	May 7	17	
May 7	"One Dance" (#3)	Drake featuring Wizkid and Kyla	1	May 21	20	
May 14	"Purple Rain"^{[D]}^{[α]}	Prince and The Revolution	4	May 14	1	
May 14	"When Doves Cry"^{[D]}^{[α]}	Prince	8	May 14	1	
May 14	"Formation" ↑	Beyoncé	10	May 14	1	
May 21	"Don't Let Me Down" (#8)	The Chainsmokers featuring Daya	3	July 16	23	
May 21	"This Is What You Came For"^{[G]} ↑	Calvin Harris featuring Rihanna	3	August 6	19	
May 28	"Can't Stop the Feeling!" (#9) ↑	Justin Timberlake	1	May 28	15	
May 28	"Needed Me"^{[I]}	Rihanna	7	July 2	16	
June 18	"Just Like Fire"	Pink	10	June 18	2	
July 2	"Cheap Thrills"	Sia featuring Sean Paul	1	August 6	18	
July 2	"Don't Mind"	Kent Jones	8	July 16	6	
July 9	"Ride"	Twenty One Pilots	5	September 10	13	
July 30	"Send My Love (To Your New Lover)"^{[H]}^{[J]}	Adele	8	September 24	8	
August 13	"Cold Water" ↑	Major Lazer featuring Justin Bieber and MØ	2	August 13	14	
August 20	"Closer" (#10) ↑	The Chainsmokers featuring Halsey	1	September 3	32	
August 27	"Heathens"	Twenty One Pilots	2	September 24	18	
September 10	"Treat You Better"^{[K]}	Shawn Mendes	6	October 8	8	
September 24	"We Don't Talk Anymore"^{[L]}	Charlie Puth featuring Selena Gomez	9	October 8	2	
October 1	"Let Me Love You"	DJ Snake featuring Justin Bieber	4	October 8	17	
October 8	"Broccoli"	DRAM featuring Lil Yachty	5	November 5	12	
October 22	"I Hate U, I Love U"^{[M]}	Gnash featuring Olivia O'Brien	10	October 22	2	
October 29	"24K Magic" ↑	Bruno Mars	4	December 10	15	
October 29	"Side to Side"	Ariana Grande featuring Nicki Minaj	4	December 3	14	
November 12	"Juju on that Beat (TZ Anthem)"	Zay Hilfigerrr & Zayion McCall	5	December 10	10	
November 19	"Black Beatles"	Rae Sremmurd featuring Gucci Mane	1	November 26	14	
December 31	"Deja Vu" ↑	J. Cole	7	December 31	1	

Notes

- ^{^[α]} – α "When Doves Cry" and "Purple Rain" both originally charted in 1984, with the former spending five weeks at #1, beginning on July 7, 1984, and the latter reaching #2 on November 17 that year. "Doves" originally accumulated 11 weeks in the top 10, while "Purple" was in the tier for seven weeks. See List of Billboard Hot 100 top 10 singles in 1984 for more. The above entries for the two singles reflect their runs in 2016 only.

=== 2015 peaks ===
List of Billboard Hot 100 top ten singles in 2016 which peaked in 2015
Top ten entry date	Single	Artist(s)	Peak	Peak date	Weeks in top ten	References
August 1	"The Hills"	The Weeknd	1	October 3	21	
September 19	"What Do You Mean?" ↑	Justin Bieber	1	September 19	21	
October 3	"Hotline Bling"	Drake	2	October 24	19	
October 17	"Stitches"^{[A]}	Shawn Mendes	4	November 7	18	
November 14	"Hello" (#7) ↑	Adele	1	November 14	18	
November 21	"Like I'm Gonna Lose You"	Meghan Trainor featuring John Legend	8	December 12	10	

=== 2017 peaks ===
List of Billboard Hot 100 top ten singles in 2016 which peaked in 2017
Top ten entry date	Single	Artist(s)	Peak	Peak date	Weeks in top ten	References
October 15	"Starboy"	The Weeknd featuring Daft Punk	1	January 7	19	
November 5	"Don't Wanna Know"^{[N]}	Maroon 5 featuring Kendrick Lamar	6	February 18	14	
November 19	"Fake Love"	Drake	8	February 18	6	
December 24	"Bad Things"	Machine Gun Kelly and Camila Cabello	4	February 11	10	
December 31	"I Don't Wanna Live Forever" ↑	Zayn and Taylor Swift	2	March 4	12	

== Artists with most top-ten songs ==
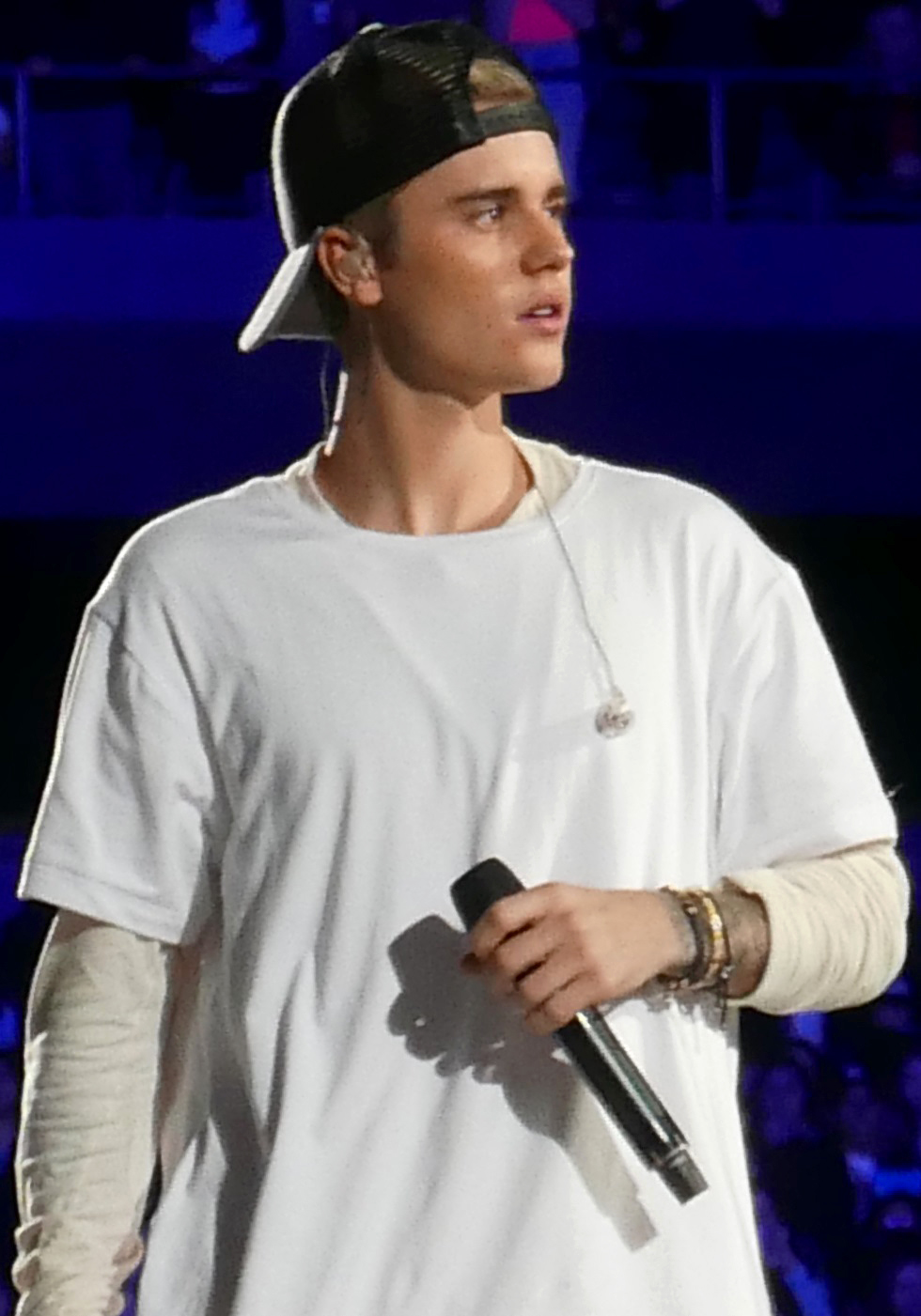
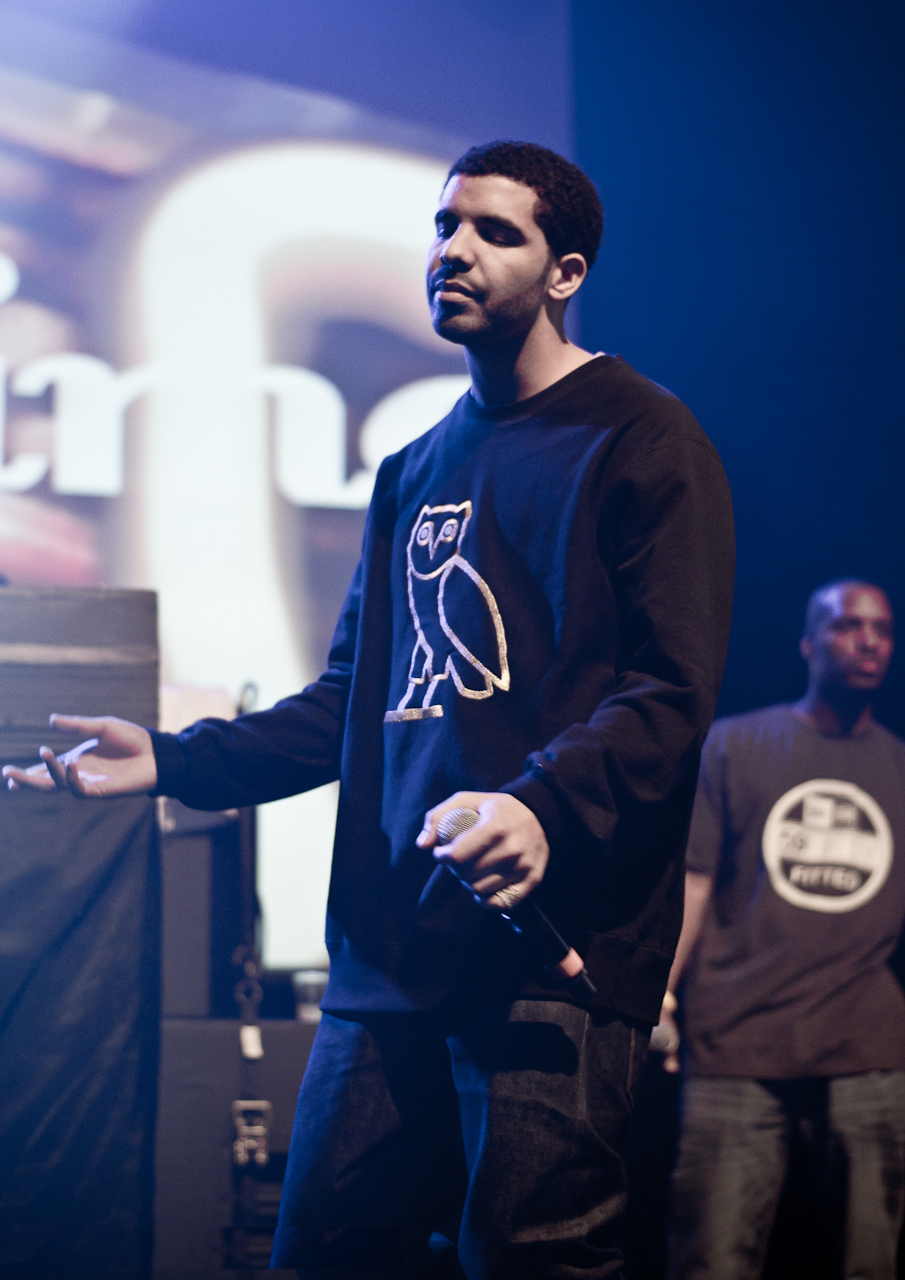
Justin Bieber (left) and Drake (right) are tied with the most top ten hits in 2016, with five. Two of their respective songs became number-one hits during the year, with "Sorry" and "Love Yourself" from Bieber, and "Work" and "One Dance" by Drake.

List of artists by total songs peaking in the top-ten
Artist	Numbers of songs
Drake	5
Justin Bieber	5
The Chainsmokers	3
Rihanna	3
Selena Gomez	3
Twenty One Pilots	3
Adele	2
Ariana Grande	2
Meghan Trainor	2
Prince	2
Shawn Mendes	2
The Weeknd	2
Zayn	2

== See also ==
- 2016 in American music
- List of Billboard Hot 100 number ones of 2016
- Billboard Year-End Hot 100 singles of 2016

== Notes ==
- ^{^[A]}The single re-entered the top ten on the week ending February 27, 2016.
- ^{^[B]}The single re-entered the top ten on the week ending April 9, 2016.
- ^{^[C]}The single re-entered the top ten on the week ending April 30, 2016.
- ^{^[D]}The single re-entered the top ten on the week ending May 14, 2016.
- ^{^[E]}The single re-entered the top ten on the week ending May 21, 2016.
- ^{^[F]}The single re-entered the top ten on the week ending June 11, 2016.
- ^{^[G]}The single re-entered the top ten on the week ending June 18, 2016.
- ^{^[H]}The single re-entered the top ten on the week ending September 3, 2016.
- ^{^[I]}The single re-entered the top ten on the week ending September 17, 2016.
- ^{^[J]}The single re-entered the top ten on the week ending September 24, 2016.
- ^{^[K]}The single re-entered the top ten on the week ending October 1, 2016.
- ^{^[L]}The single re-entered the top ten on the week ending October 8, 2016.
- ^{^[M]}The single re-entered the top ten on the week ending November 12, 2016.
- ^{^[N]}The single re-entered the top ten on the week ending November 26, 2016.
