= List of Billboard Mainstream Top 40 number-one songs of 2016 =

This is a list of songs which reached number one on the Billboard Mainstream Top 40 (or Pop Songs) chart in 2016.

During 2016, a total of 21 singles hit number-one on the charts, making 2016 the year with the most number-one hits on the Mainstream Top 40.

== Chart history ==
Key
†	Indicates best-performing single of 2016

Issue date	Song	Artist(s)	Ref.
January 2	"Sorry"	Justin Bieber	
January 9	"Sorry"	Justin Bieber	
January 16	"Sorry"	Justin Bieber	
January 23	"Same Old Love"	Selena Gomez	
January 30	"Same Old Love"	Selena Gomez	
February 6	"Here"	Alessia Cara	
February 13	"Love Yourself"†	Justin Bieber	
February 20	"Love Yourself"†	Justin Bieber	
February 27	"Love Yourself"†	Justin Bieber	
March 5	"Love Yourself"†	Justin Bieber	
March 12	"Love Yourself"†	Justin Bieber	
March 19	"Stressed Out"	Twenty One Pilots	
March 26	"My House"	Flo Rida	
April 2	"My House"	Flo Rida	
April 9	"My House"	Flo Rida	
April 16	"Hands to Myself"	Selena Gomez	
April 23	"Me, Myself & I"	G-Eazy and Bebe Rexha	
April 30	"Me, Myself & I"	G-Eazy and Bebe Rexha	
May 7	"Pillowtalk"	Zayn	
May 14	"Pillowtalk"	Zayn	
May 21	"I Took a Pill in Ibiza" (SeeB Remix)	Mike Posner	
May 28	"7 Years"	Lukas Graham	
June 4	"Work from Home"	Fifth Harmony featuring Ty Dolla $ign	
June 11	"Work from Home"	Fifth Harmony featuring Ty Dolla $ign	
June 18	"Can't Stop the Feeling!"	Justin Timberlake	
June 25	"Can't Stop the Feeling!"	Justin Timberlake	
July 2	"Can't Stop the Feeling!"	Justin Timberlake	
July 9	"Don't Let Me Down"	The Chainsmokers featuring Daya	
July 16	"Don't Let Me Down"	The Chainsmokers featuring Daya	
July 23	"Don't Let Me Down"	The Chainsmokers featuring Daya	
July 30	"One Dance"	Drake featuring Wizkid and Kyla	
August 6	"Cheap Thrills"	Sia featuring Sean Paul	
August 13	"Cheap Thrills"	Sia featuring Sean Paul	
August 20	"Cheap Thrills"	Sia featuring Sean Paul	
August 27	"Cheap Thrills"	Sia featuring Sean Paul	
September 3	"Cheap Thrills"	Sia featuring Sean Paul	
September 10	"Ride"	Twenty One Pilots	
September 17	"Ride"	Twenty One Pilots	
September 24	"Send My Love (To Your New Lover)"	Adele	
October 1	"Cold Water"	Major Lazer featuring Justin Bieber and MØ	
October 8	"Closer"	The Chainsmokers featuring Halsey	
October 15	"Closer"	The Chainsmokers featuring Halsey	
October 22	"Closer"	The Chainsmokers featuring Halsey	
October 29	"Closer"	The Chainsmokers featuring Halsey	
November 5	"Closer"	The Chainsmokers featuring Halsey	
November 12	"Closer"	The Chainsmokers featuring Halsey	
November 19	"Closer"	The Chainsmokers featuring Halsey	
November 26	"Closer"	The Chainsmokers featuring Halsey	
December 3	"Closer"	The Chainsmokers featuring Halsey	
December 10	"Closer"	The Chainsmokers featuring Halsey	
December 17	"Closer"	The Chainsmokers featuring Halsey	
December 24	"Side to Side"	Ariana Grande featuring Nicki Minaj	
December 31	"Side to Side"	Ariana Grande featuring Nicki Minaj	

== See also ==
- 2016 in American music
