= List of Billboard Streaming Songs number ones of 2016 =

This is a list of songs that reached number one on the Billboard magazine Streaming Songs chart in 2016.

== Chart history ==
Key
†	Indicates best-charting streaming song of 2016

Issue date	Song	Artist(s)	Weekly streams
January 2	"Sorry"	Justin Bieber	23.7 million
January 9	"Sorry"	Justin Bieber	24.4 million
January 16	"Sorry"	Justin Bieber	23.2 million
January 23	"Sorry"	Justin Bieber	20 million
January 30	"Sorry"	Justin Bieber	20.5 million
February 6	"Sorry"	Justin Bieber	20 million
February 13	"Sorry"	Justin Bieber	18.6 million
February 20	"Pillowtalk"	Zayn	22.3 million
February 27	"Sorry"	Justin Bieber	17.8 million
March 5	"Work"	Rihanna featuring Drake	25.8 million
March 12	"Work"	Rihanna featuring Drake	46.5 million
March 19	"Work"	Rihanna featuring Drake	44.4 million
March 26	"Work"	Rihanna featuring Drake	36.9 million
April 2	"Work"	Rihanna featuring Drake	34 million
April 9	"Work"	Rihanna featuring Drake	31.6 million
April 16	"Work"	Rihanna featuring Drake	28.8 million
April 23	"Work"	Rihanna featuring Drake	27 million
April 30	"Panda" †	Desiigner	28.5 million
May 7	"Panda" †	Desiigner	35 million
May 14	"Panda" †	Desiigner	36.6 million
May 21	"One Dance"	Drake featuring Wizkid and Kyla	37.4 million
May 28	"Panda" †	Desiigner	38.5 million
June 4	"Panda" †	Desiigner	40.1 million
June 11	"Panda" †	Desiigner	38.6 million
June 18	"Panda" †	Desiigner	34.6 million
June 25	"Panda" †	Desiigner	32.4 million
July 2	"Panda" †	Desiigner	29.3 million
July 9	"Panda" †	Desiigner	26.8 million
July 16	"Panda" †	Desiigner	25.9 million
July 23	"Panda" †	Desiigner	24.7 million
July 30	"Panda" †	Desiigner	21.8 million
August 6	"Panda" †	Desiigner	20.1 million
August 13	"Cold Water"	Major Lazer featuring Justin Bieber and MØ	19.6 million
August 20	"Cold Water"	Major Lazer featuring Justin Bieber and MØ	18.9 million
August 27	"Cold Water"	Major Lazer featuring Justin Bieber and MØ	19.6 million
September 3	"Closer"	The Chainsmokers featuring Halsey	23.1 million
September 10	"Closer"	The Chainsmokers featuring Halsey	28.6 million
September 17	"Closer"	The Chainsmokers featuring Halsey	36.8 million
September 24	"Closer"	The Chainsmokers featuring Halsey	40.5 million
October 1	"Closer"	The Chainsmokers featuring Halsey	39.5 million
October 8	"Closer"	The Chainsmokers featuring Halsey	38.9 million
October 15	"Closer"	The Chainsmokers featuring Halsey	37.8 million
October 22	"Closer"	The Chainsmokers featuring Halsey	35.2 million
October 29	"Closer"	The Chainsmokers featuring Halsey	33.2 million
November 5	"Closer"	The Chainsmokers featuring Halsey	32.1 million
November 12	"Closer"	The Chainsmokers featuring Halsey	31.9 million
November 19	"Closer"	The Chainsmokers featuring Halsey	28.7 million
November 26	"Black Beatles"	Rae Sremmurd featuring Gucci Mane	43.3 million
December 3	"Black Beatles"	Rae Sremmurd featuring Gucci Mane	54.1 million
December 10	"Black Beatles"	Rae Sremmurd featuring Gucci Mane	55.9 million
December 17	"Black Beatles"	Rae Sremmurd featuring Gucci Mane	42 million
December 24	"Black Beatles"	Rae Sremmurd featuring Gucci Mane	38 million
December 31	"Black Beatles"	Rae Sremmurd featuring Gucci Mane	32.7 million

== See also ==
- 2016 in music
- List of Billboard Hot 100 number-one singles of 2016
