= List of number-one digital songs of 2016 (U.S.) =

2016 highest-selling digital singles in the United States

The list of number-one digital songs of 2016 in the United States are based upon the highest-selling downloaded songs ranked in the Digital Songs chart, published by Billboard magazine. The data are compiled by Nielsen SoundScan based on each single's weekly digital sales, which combines sales of different versions of a song by an act for a summarized figure.

== Chart history ==
Key
†	Indicates best-charting digital song of 2016

Issue date	Song	Artist(s)	Weekly sales	Ref(s)
January 2	"Mary, Did You Know?"	Jordan Smith	161,000	
January 9	"Hello"	Adele	174,000	
January 16	"Hello"	Adele	327,000	
January 23	"Love Yourself" †	Justin Bieber	164,000	
January 30	"Love Yourself" †	Justin Bieber	147,000	
February 6	"Love Yourself" †	Justin Bieber	139,000	
February 13	"Work"	Rihanna featuring Drake	126,000	
February 20	"Pillowtalk"	Zayn	267,000	
February 27	"My House"	Flo Rida	136,000	
March 5	"My House"	Flo Rida	135,000	
March 12	"Work"	Rihanna featuring Drake	169,000	
March 19	"Piece by Piece"	Kelly Clarkson	210,000	
March 26	"7 Years"	Lukas Graham	121,000	
April 2	"7 Years"	Lukas Graham	125,000	
April 9	"No"	Meghan Trainor	128,000	
April 16	"7 Years"	Lukas Graham	155,000	
April 23	"Pop Style"	Drake featuring The Throne	128,000	
April 30	"One Dance"	Drake featuring WizKid and Kyla	119,000	
May 7	"Purple Rain"	Prince and the Revolution	122,000	
May 14	"Purple Rain"	Prince and the Revolution	282,000	
May 21	"One Dance"	Drake featuring WizKid and Kyla	160,000	
May 28	"Can't Stop the Feeling!"	Justin Timberlake	379,000	
June 4	"Can't Stop the Feeling!"	Justin Timberlake	204,000	
June 11	"Can't Stop the Feeling!"	Justin Timberlake	174,000	
June 18	"Can't Stop the Feeling!"	Justin Timberlake	155,000	
June 25	"Can't Stop the Feeling!"	Justin Timberlake	138,000	
July 2	"Can't Stop the Feeling!"	Justin Timberlake	124,000	
July 9	"Can't Stop the Feeling!"	Justin Timberlake	118,000	
July 16	"Can't Stop the Feeling!"	Justin Timberlake	107,000	
July 23	"Can't Stop the Feeling!"	Justin Timberlake	98,000	
July 30	"Can't Stop the Feeling!"	Justin Timberlake	92,000	
August 6	"Rise"	Katy Perry	137,000	
August 13	"Cold Water"	Major Lazer featuring Justin Bieber and MØ	169,000	
August 20	"Closer"	The Chainsmokers featuring Halsey	103,000	
August 27	"Let Me Love You"	DJ Snake featuring Justin Bieber	113,000	
September 3	"Closer"	The Chainsmokers featuring Halsey	116,000	
September 10	"Closer"	The Chainsmokers featuring Halsey	143,000	
September 17	"Closer"	The Chainsmokers featuring Halsey	208,000	
September 24	"Closer"	The Chainsmokers featuring Halsey	199,000	
October 1	"Closer"	The Chainsmokers featuring Halsey	170,000	
October 8	"Closer"	The Chainsmokers featuring Halsey	162,000	
October 15	"Closer"	The Chainsmokers featuring Halsey	137,000	
October 22	"Closer"	The Chainsmokers featuring Halsey	123,000	
October 29	"Closer"	The Chainsmokers featuring Halsey	111,000	
November 5	"Closer"	The Chainsmokers featuring Halsey	97,000	
November 12	"Closer"	The Chainsmokers featuring Halsey	84,000	
November 19	"Closer"	The Chainsmokers featuring Halsey	72,000	
November 26	"Black Beatles"	Rae Sremmurd featuring Gucci Mane	144,000	
December 3	"Black Beatles"	Rae Sremmurd featuring Gucci Mane	154,000	
December 10	"Black Beatles"	Rae Sremmurd featuring Gucci Mane	138,000	
December 17	"Black Beatles"	Rae Sremmurd featuring Gucci Mane	83,000	
December 24	"Black Beatles"	Rae Sremmurd featuring Gucci Mane	70,000	
December 31	"I Don't Wanna Live Forever"	Zayn and Taylor Swift	188,000	

== See also ==
- 2016 in music
- List of Billboard Hot 100 number-one singles of 2016
