= List of Dutch Top 40 number-one singles of 2016 =

This is a list of the Dutch Top 40 number-one singles of 2016. The Dutch Top 40 is a chart that ranks the best-performing singles of the Netherlands. It is published every week by radio station Radio 538.

== Chart history ==
Issue date	Song	Artist(s)	Ref.
January 2	"Sorry"	Justin Bieber	
January 9	"Love Yourself"	Justin Bieber	
January 16	"Love Yourself"	Justin Bieber	
January 23	"Love Yourself"	Justin Bieber	
January 30	"7 Years"	Lukas Graham	
February 6	"7 Years"	Lukas Graham	
February 13	"I Took a Pill in Ibiza" (SeeB remix)	Mike Posner	
February 20	"I Took a Pill in Ibiza" (SeeB remix)	Mike Posner	
February 27	"I Took a Pill in Ibiza" (SeeB remix)	Mike Posner	
March 5	"I Took a Pill in Ibiza" (SeeB remix)	Mike Posner	
March 12	"I Took a Pill in Ibiza" (SeeB remix)	Mike Posner	
March 19	"I Took a Pill in Ibiza" (SeeB remix)	Mike Posner	
March 26	"I Took a Pill in Ibiza" (SeeB remix)	Mike Posner	
April 2	"I Took a Pill in Ibiza" (SeeB remix)	Mike Posner	
April 9	"I Took a Pill in Ibiza" (SeeB remix)	Mike Posner	
April 16	"I Took a Pill in Ibiza" (SeeB remix)	Mike Posner	
April 23	"Work from Home"	Fifth Harmony featuring Ty Dolla Sign	
April 30	"One Dance"	Drake featuring Wizkid and Kyla	
May 7	"One Dance"	Drake featuring Wizkid and Kyla	
May 14	"One Dance"	Drake featuring Wizkid and Kyla	
May 21	"One Dance"	Drake featuring Wizkid and Kyla	
May 28	"One Dance"	Drake featuring Wizkid and Kyla	
June 4	"One Dance"	Drake featuring Wizkid and Kyla	
June 11	"Can't Stop the Feeling!"	Justin Timberlake	
June 18	"Can't Stop the Feeling!"	Justin Timberlake	
June 25	"Can't Stop the Feeling!"	Justin Timberlake	
July 2	"Can't Stop the Feeling!"	Justin Timberlake	
July 9	"Can't Stop the Feeling!"	Justin Timberlake	
July 16	"Can't Stop the Feeling!"	Justin Timberlake	
July 23	"Can't Stop the Feeling!"	Justin Timberlake	
July 30	"Can't Stop the Feeling!"	Justin Timberlake	
August 6	"Cold Water"	Major Lazer featuring Justin Bieber and MØ	
August 13	"Cold Water"	Major Lazer featuring Justin Bieber and MØ	
August 20	"Cold Water"	Major Lazer featuring Justin Bieber and MØ	
August 27	"Cold Water"	Major Lazer featuring Justin Bieber and MØ	
September 3	"Cold Water"	Major Lazer featuring Justin Bieber and MØ	
September 10	"Cold Water"	Major Lazer featuring Justin Bieber and MØ	
September 17	"Let Me Love You"	DJ Snake featuring Justin Bieber	
September 24	"Let Me Love You"	DJ Snake featuring Justin Bieber	
October 1	"Let Me Love You"	DJ Snake featuring Justin Bieber	
October 8	"Let Me Love You"	DJ Snake featuring Justin Bieber	
October 15	"Let Me Love You"	DJ Snake featuring Justin Bieber	
October 22	"Closer"	The Chainsmokers featuring Halsey	
October 29	"Closer"	The Chainsmokers featuring Halsey	
November 5	"Closer"	The Chainsmokers featuring Halsey	
November 12	"Closer"	The Chainsmokers featuring Halsey	
November 19	"Starboy"	The Weeknd featuring Daft Punk	
November 26	"Starboy"	The Weeknd featuring Daft Punk	
December 2	"Starboy"	The Weeknd featuring Daft Punk	
December 9	"Starboy"	The Weeknd featuring Daft Punk	
December 16	"Rockabye"	Clean Bandit featuring Sean Paul and Anne-Marie	
December 23	"Rockabye"	Clean Bandit featuring Sean Paul and Anne-Marie	
December 30	"Rockabye"	Clean Bandit featuring Sean Paul and Anne-Marie	

== Number-one artists ==
Position	Artist	Weeks #1
1	Justin Bieber	15
2	Mike Posner	10
2	SeeB (as featuring)	10
3	Justin Timberlake	8
4	Drake	6
4	Wizkid (as featuring)	6
4	Kyla (as featuring)	6
4	Major Lazer	6
4	MØ (as featuring)	6
5	DJ Snake	5
6	The Chainsmokers	4
6	Halsey (as featuring)	4
6	The Weeknd	4
6	Daft Punk (as featuring)	4
7	Clean Bandit	3
7	Anne-Marie (as featuring)	3
7	Sean Paul (as featuring)	3
8	Lukas Graham	2
9	Fifth Harmony	1
9	Ty Dolla Sign (as featuring)	1

== See also ==
- 2016 in music
