= Should've Been Me =

Single by Naughty Boy featuring Kyla and Popcaan
- Released: 18 November 2016
- Recorded: 2015
- Genre: Reggae fusion; dancehall
- Length: 4:04
- Label: Naughty Boy; Virgin EMI
- Songwriter(s): James Murray; Shahid Khan; Mustafa Omer; Emily Warren; Scott Harris; Kyla Reid; Andrae Sutherland
- Producer(s): Naughty Boy; Mojam; MiniE5

Naughty Boy singles chronology
"Runnin' (Lose It All)" (2015)	"Should've Been Me" (2016)	"One Chance to Dance" (2017)

Popcaan singles chronology
"Ova Dweet" (2016)	"Should've Been Me" (2016)	"Saturnz Barz" (2017)

Kyla single singles chronology
"One Dance" (2016)	"Should've Been Me" (2016)	"You Ain't Mine" (2017)

"Should've Been Me" is a song by British record producer Naughty Boy featuring vocals from Kyla and Popcaan. It was released as a digital download in the United Kingdom on 18 November 2016. The song has peaked at number 61 on the UK Singles Chart. The artists co-wrote the song with James Murray, Mustafa Omer, Emily Warren, and Scott Harris.

== Music video ==
A music video to accompany the release of "Should've Been Me" was first released onto YouTube on 1 December 2016 at a total length of four minutes and thirty seconds.

== Track listing ==
Digital download
No.	Title	Length
1.	"Should've Been Me" (featuring Kyla and Popcaan)	4:04

== Chart performance ==
=== Weekly charts ===
Chart (2016–17)	Peak position
Belgium (Ultratip Bubbling Under Flanders)	35
Hungary (Rádiós Top 40)	10
Ireland (IRMA)	61
Scotland (OCC)	47
UK Singles (OCC)	61

=== Year-end charts ===
Chart (2017)	Position
Hungary (Rádiós Top 40)	92

== Certifications ==
Region	Certification	Certified units/sales
United Kingdom (BPI)	Silver	200,000^{‡}
^{‡} Sales+streaming figures based on certification alone.

== Release history ==
Region	Date	Format	Label
United Kingdom	18 November 2016	Digital download	Naughty Boy; Virgin EMI
