= Do You Mind (Kyla song) =

Single by Kyla
- Released: 26 January 2009
- Recorded: 2008
- Genre: House; UK funky
- Length: 3:32 (single version); 3:44 (video version)
- Label: Defenders Entertainment
- Songwriter: Kyla Reid
- Producer: Crazy Cousinz

Kyla singles chronology
"Do You Mind" (2009)	"One Dance" (2016)

"Do You Mind" is the debut single by British singer Kyla. It was released as a digital download in the United Kingdom on 26 January 2009. The song peaked at number 48 on the UK Singles Chart in 2009.

== Samples ==
"Do You Mind (Crazy Cousinz Remix)" was later heavily sampled in Drake's "One Dance" (2016) which peaked at number-one in the UK, US and Canada.

"Do You Mind" was also sampled in ArrDee's 2022 single "Hello Mate", with Kyla being credited as a featured artist. The single peaked at number 37 on the UK charts.

== Charts ==
Chart (2008–2009)	Peak position
UK Singles (Official Charts)	48

Chart (2016)	Peak position
UK Indie (Official Charts)	49

Chart (2026)	Peak position
Ireland (IRMA)	42
Netherlands (Single Tip)	3
UK Singles (Official Charts)	52
UK Dance (Official Charts)	11
UK Indie (Official Charts)	10
US Hot Dance/Electronic Songs (Billboard) DJ Paleface remix	9

== Certifications ==
Region	Certification	Certified units/sales
United Kingdom (BPI)	Gold	400,000^{‡}
^{‡} Sales+streaming figures based on certification alone.

== Resurgence ==
In 2026, the social media platform TikTok declared the track as its Song of the Summer, having featured in approximately 650,000 videos, amassing over 500 million views, over the course of the summer.
