= List of Billboard 200 number-one albums of 2016 =

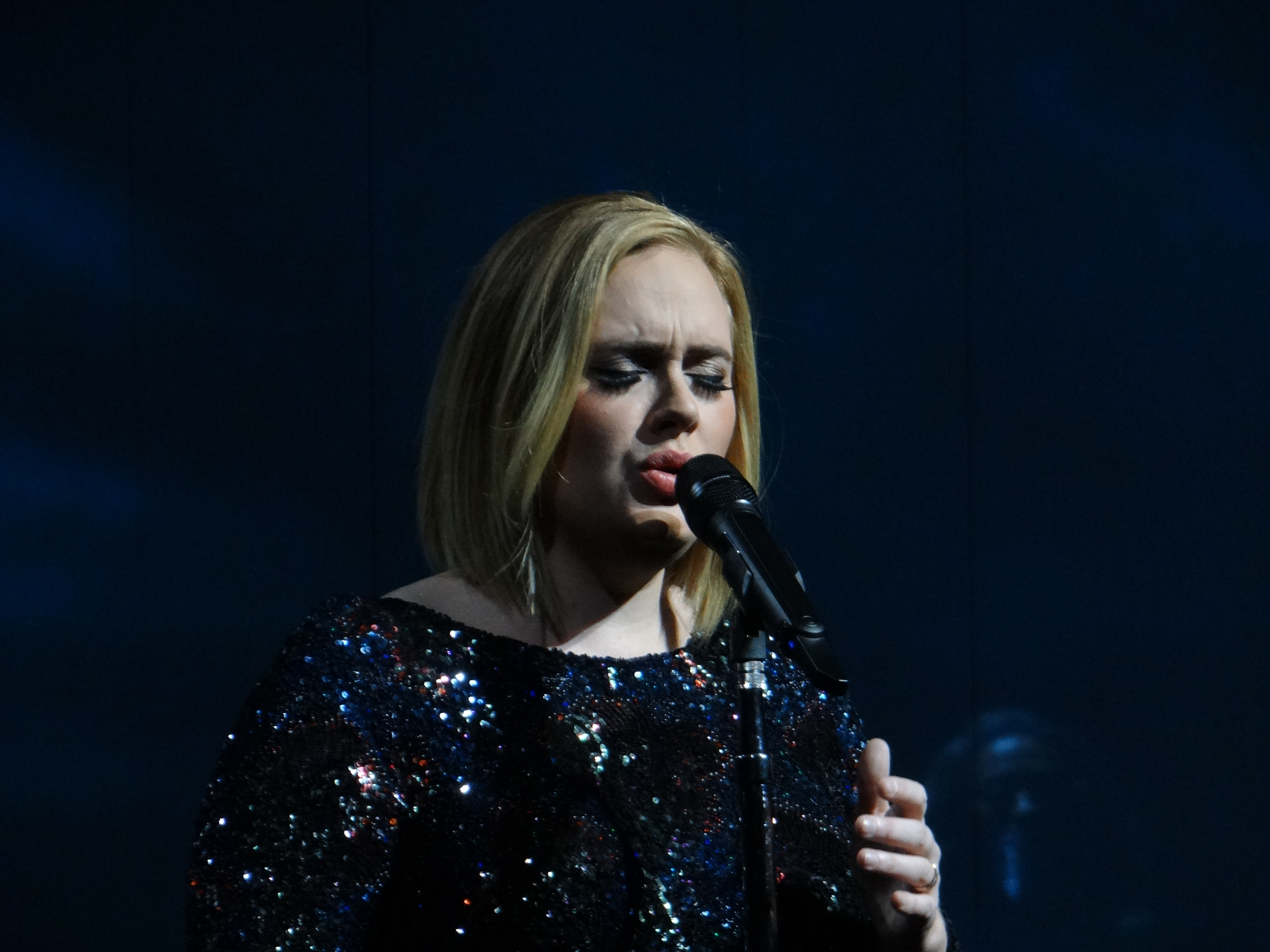
English singer Adele's (pictured) third studio album, 25, was the best-seller of 2016 and continued its run at the top slot on the Billboard 200 for an additional seven weeks as the calendar year had started.

The highest-selling albums and EPs in the United States are ranked in the Billboard 200, which is published by Billboard magazine. The data are compiled by Nielsen Soundscan based on each album's weekly physical and digital sales, as well as on-demand streaming and digital sales of its individual tracks. In 2016, a total of 33 albums claimed the top position of the chart. One of which, English singer Adele's 25 started its peak issue dated December 12, 2015.

Canadian rapper Drake's fourth studio album, Views, became the second best-selling overall album with 1.04 million equivalent album units, selling 852,000 copies in its first week of release, and achieving over 245 million streams, more than previous record 115.2 million by Beyoncé's Lemonade. Lemonade is the third overall best-seller, incurring 485,000 copies in its first week (653,000 with additional album-equivalent units).

== Chart history ==
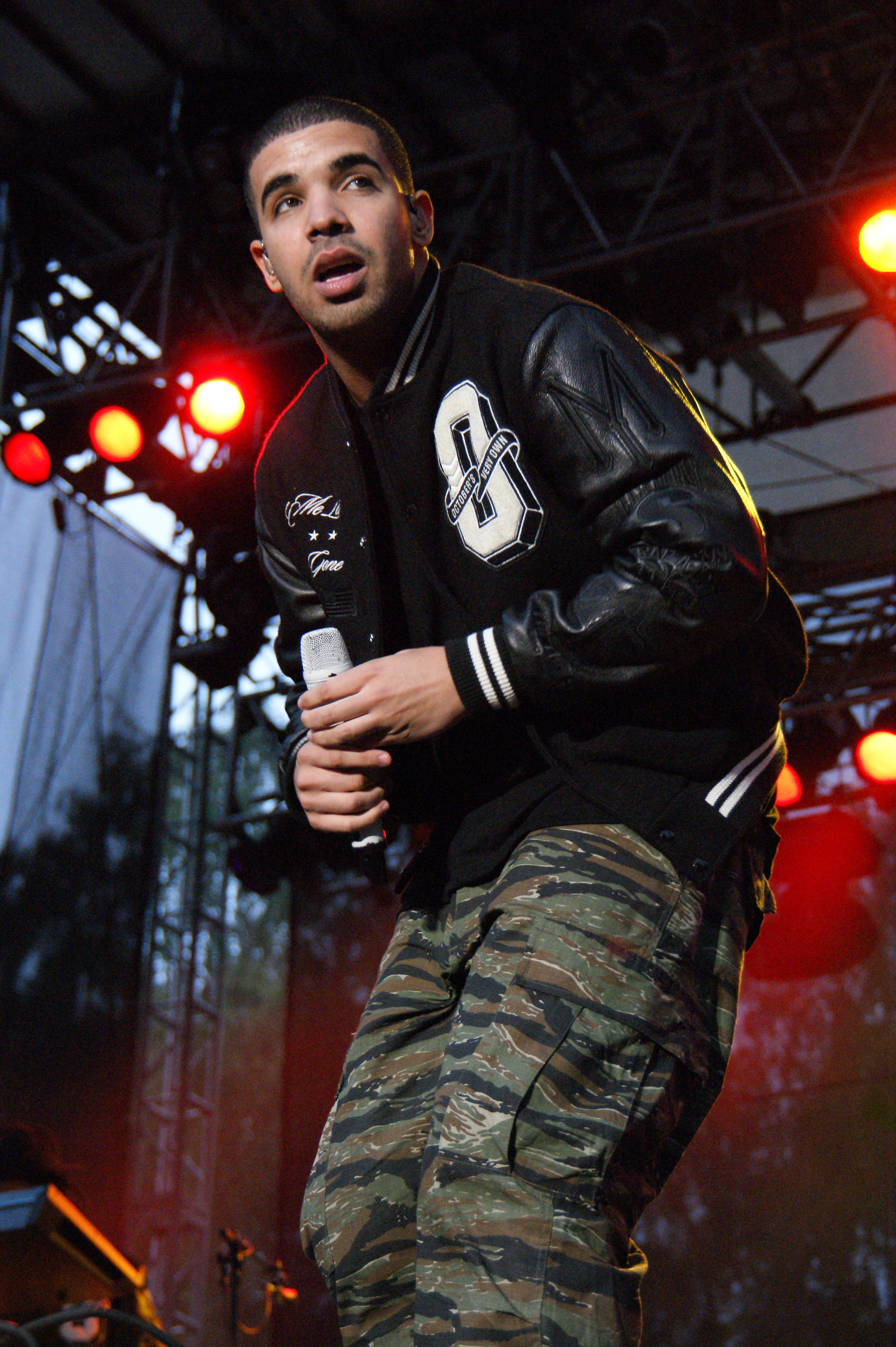
Views was the sixth number-one album in Canadian rapper Drake's career. It topped the chart for 13 weeks as the longest reigning number one album of 2016, and was the most consumed album of the year, and the second best-selling album.

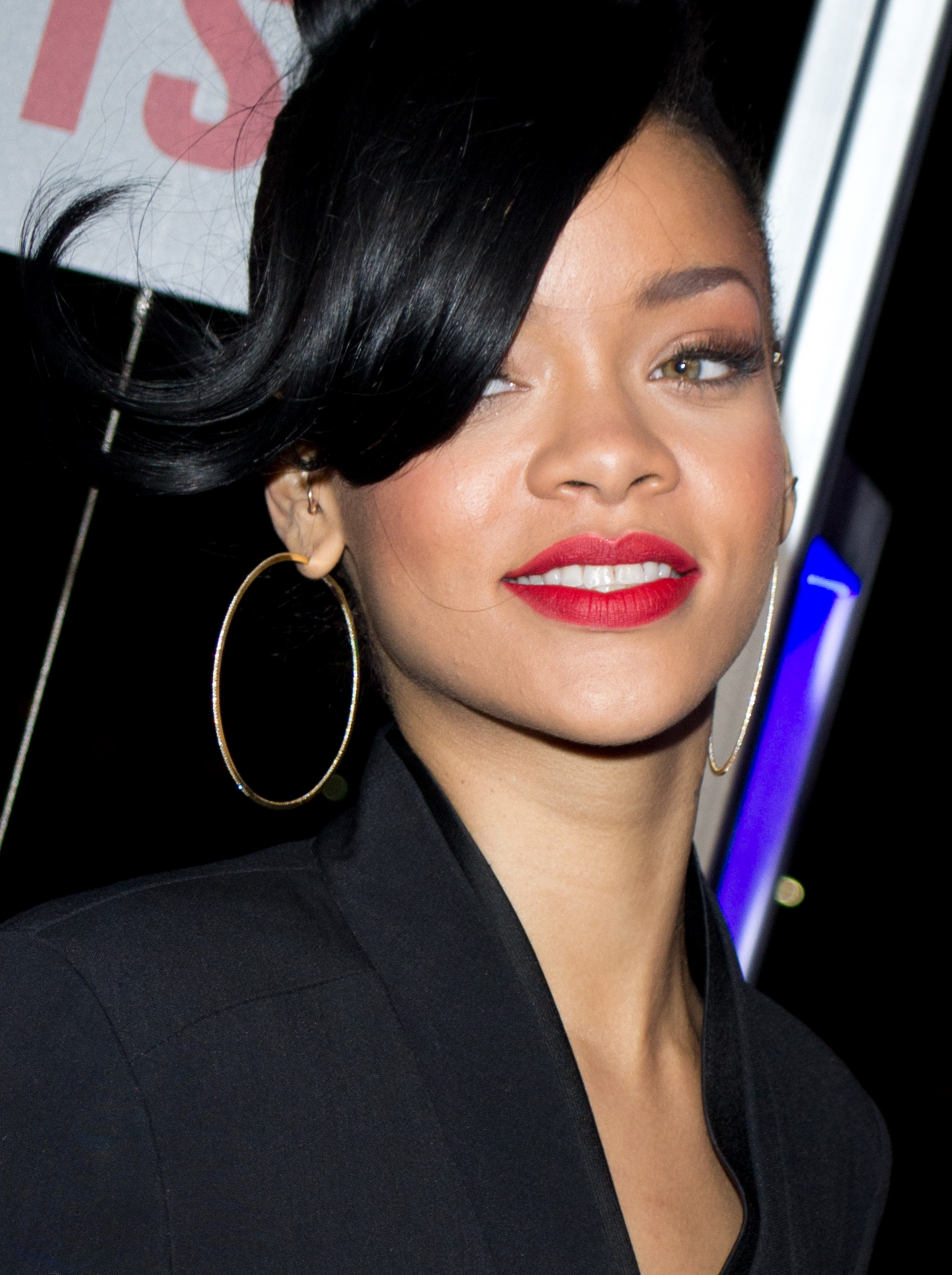
Rihanna gained her second number one album with her eighth studio album, Anti, which spent two weeks atop the chart. It was the fourth most consumed album of 2016.

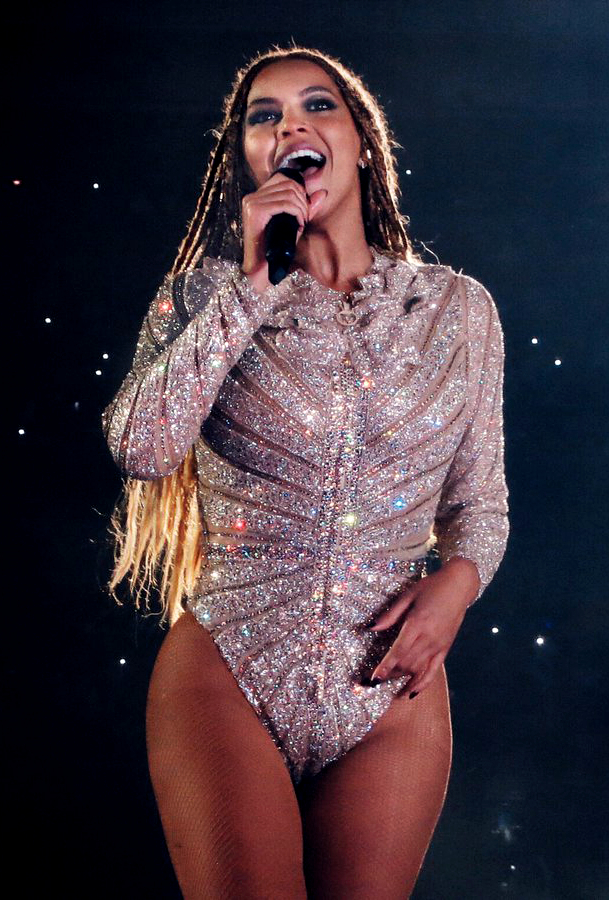
Beyoncé's sixth studio album, Lemonade, helped the singer score her sixth number-one effort. It was the third best-selling album of the year.

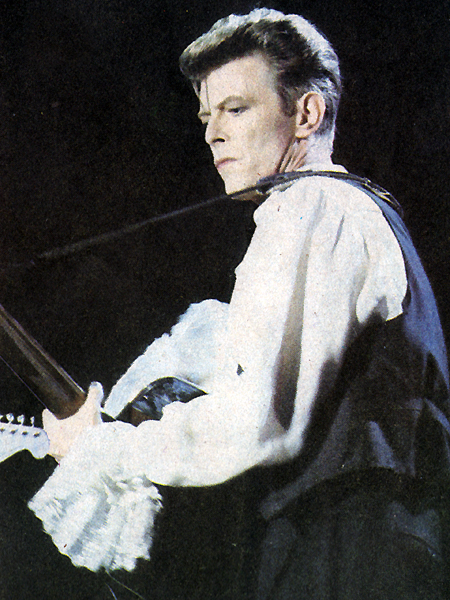
Following his death on January 10, 2016, David Bowie's (archived) twenty-fifth and final studio album, Blackstar, released on his sixty-ninth birthday, two days before his death, reached number-one on the Billboard 200, posthumously.

Key
†	Indicates best performing album of 2016

Issue date	Album	Artist(s)	Album- equivalent units	Ref.
January 2	25 †	Adele	825,000	
January 9	25 †	Adele	1,160,000	
January 16	25 †	Adele	363,000	
January 23	25 †	Adele	194,000	
January 30	Blackstar	David Bowie	181,000	
February 6	Death of a Bachelor	Panic! at the Disco	190,000	
February 13	25 †	Adele	116,000	
February 20	Anti	Rihanna	166,000	
February 27	Evol	Future	134,000	
March 5	25 †	Adele	151,000	
March 12	25 †	Adele	100,000	
March 19	I Like It When You Sleep, for You Are So Beautiful yet So Unaware of It	The 1975	108,000	
March 26	Untitled Unmastered.	Kendrick Lamar	178,000	
April 2	Anti	Rihanna	54,000	
April 9	This Is What the Truth Feels Like	Gwen Stefani	84,000	
April 16	Mind of Mine	Zayn	157,000	
April 23	The Life of Pablo	Kanye West	94,000	
April 30	Cleopatra	The Lumineers	125,000	
May 7	The Very Best of Prince	Prince	179,000	
May 14	Lemonade	Beyoncé	653,000	
May 21	Views	Drake	1,040,000	
May 28	Views	Drake	313,000	
June 4	Views	Drake	239,000	
June 11	Views	Drake	189,000	
June 18	Views	Drake	152,000	
June 25	Views	Drake	135,000	
July 2	Views	Drake	121,000	
July 9	Views	Drake	124,000	
July 16	Views	Drake	111,000	
July 23	California	Blink-182	186,000	
July 30	Views	Drake	92,000	
August 6	Views	Drake	89,000	
August 13	Views	Drake	85,000	
August 20	Major Key	DJ Khaled	95,000	
August 27	Suicide Squad: The Album	Soundtrack	182,000	
September 3	Suicide Squad: The Album	Soundtrack	93,000	
September 10	Blonde	Frank Ocean	276,000	
September 17	Encore: Movie Partners Sing Broadway	Barbra Streisand	149,000	
September 24	Birds in the Trap Sing McKnight	Travis Scott	88,000	
October 1	They Don't Know	Jason Aldean	138,000	
October 8	Views	Drake	53,000	
October 15	Illuminate	Shawn Mendes	145,000	
October 22	A Seat at the Table	Solange	72,000	
October 29	Revolution Radio	Green Day	95,000	
November 5	Walls	Kings of Leon	77,000	
November 12	Joanne	Lady Gaga	201,000	
November 19	Trap or Die 3	Jeezy	89,000	
November 26	This House Is Not for Sale	Bon Jovi	129,000	
December 3	We Got It from Here... Thank You 4 Your Service	A Tribe Called Quest	135,000	
December 10	Hardwired... to Self-Destruct	Metallica	291,000	
December 17	Starboy	The Weeknd	348,000	
December 24	The Hamilton Mixtape	Various artists	187,000	
December 31	4 Your Eyez Only	J. Cole	492,000	

== Number-one artists ==
List of number-one artists by total weeks at number one
Weeks at No. 1
4

3

2

1

== See also ==
- 2016 in American music
- List of Billboard Hot 100 number ones of 2016
