= Cheap Thrills (song) =

2016 single by Sia

Single by Sia featuring Sean Paul

from the album This Is Acting
- Released: 17 December 2015 (original); 11 February 2016 (remix)
- Recorded: 2015–2016
- Studio: Echo Studios (Los Angeles, CA); Hot Closet Studios (Los Angeles, CA)
- Genre: Dancehall; pop
- Length: 3:32 (original); 3:44 (remix)
- Label: Inertia; Monkey Puzzle; RCA
- Songwriters: Sia Furler; Greg Kurstin; Sean Paul Henriques (remix)
- Producer: Greg Kurstin

Sia singles chronology
"Bang My Head" (2015)	"Cheap Thrills" (2015)	"Je te pardonne" (2016)

Sean Paul singles chronology
"Make My Love Go" (2016)	"Cheap Thrills" (2016)	"Lay You Down Easy" (2016)

Lyric video
- "Cheap Thrills (feat. Sean Paul)" on YouTube

Performance edit
- "Cheap Thrills" on YouTube

"Cheap Thrills" is a song by Australian singer and songwriter Sia from her seventh studio album, This Is Acting (2016). It was written by Sia and Greg Kurstin, and produced by Kurstin. It was originally released on 17 December 2015 as the album's second single, an official remix version of "Cheap Thrills" featuring Jamaican singer Sean Paul was made available for digital download on 11 February 2016, and another remix version of "Cheap Thrills" featuring American and Puerto Rican singer Nicky Jam was also made available for digital download on 17 June 2016. Sean Paul's version was nominated for the Grammy Award for Best Pop Duo/Group Performance.

In the United States, "Cheap Thrills" peaked at number one on the US Billboard Hot 100 becoming Sia's first number-one single in the chart, and Paul's first since "Temperature" in 2006; it also topped the national Mainstream Top 40 and Radio Songs charts. It reached the top position in many countries, including Austria, Canada, France, Germany, Ireland, Italy, Mexico, Portugal, and Spain, as well as the top 10 in Australia, Denmark, Finland, the Netherlands, New Zealand, Poland, Switzerland, and the United Kingdom, where it peaked at number two on its UK Singles Chart. It is certified Triple Diamond in Mexico, Double Diamond in Poland, Diamond in Canada, Germany, Italy, and the United States, as well as Platinum or higher in nine additional countries. It was the best-selling song of 2016 in Wallonia, France, and Italy. The solo version of the song has over 2.2 billion streams on Spotify while the Sean Paul version has over 1.1 billion streams. At the APRA Music Awards of 2018, "Cheap Thrills" won Most Played Australian Work Overseas for its songwriters, Sia and Kurstin. It won the award again at the APRA Music Awards of 2019 and again at the APRA Music Awards of 2020.

== Background and composition ==
"Cheap Thrills" was written by Sia and Greg Kurstin, and produced by Kurstin. It was originally intended to be performed by Rihanna for her album Anti (2016), but was rejected. It is a "bouncy", "reggae-tinged" synthpop and dancehall song. The song features "a constant tropical beat and electropop-style synth layers".

"Cheap Thrills" is written in the key of F♯ minor and set in a common time, 4/4 time. The vocal range in the song spans an octave, from B_{3} to B_{4}.

For certain radio stations, instead of the lyric "turn the radio on", Sia sings the name or call sign of the radio station (in Canada, "Virgin Radio" is used for Bell Media owned stations using that format). In Australia, some stations, notably in the Nova Entertainment sphere, but especially prominent in the Sydney and Central Coast regions, adjust the same lyric to "turn the shower on" instead.

== Critical reception ==
Brittany Spanos of Rolling Stone called it a "bouncy party anthem", whilst The Guardian described it as "a perfectly serviceable party tune". Nick Levine of NME praised the track's production "and there's no denying this is another superior slab of on-trend ear candy from one of pop's finest songwriters." A CBS affiliate's critic wrote that the song was the No. 3 song that "saved 2016", calling it a "formidable hit".

=== Year-end lists ===
Publication	Rank	Ref.
Billboard's 100 Best Pop Songs of 2016	11	

== Chart performance ==
In Australia, "Cheap Thrills" was eventually certified quadruple platinum for shipments of over 280,000 copies, and reached No. 6. In New Zealand, the song reached No. 3, and was certified double platinum for sales of over 30,000 copies. The song was awarded quadruple platinum in Sweden, quintuple platinum in Spain, and Double Diamond in Poland. In the UK, it peaked at No. 2 for four weeks, and has since been certified six-times platinum for shipments of over 3.6 million units.

The song became the best-selling and highest certified single in Italy for a female artist, reaching 10× platinum status, with sales of over 500,000 copies. On 25 September 2017, the song received a Diamond certification in Italy, making Sia the first female singer to ever achieve such status.

In the United States, "Cheap Thrills" debuted at number 81 on the Billboard Hot 100 on the chart dating 5 March 2016. The next week, the single dropped to number 97, but steadily started to rise on the charts. On the chart dating 16 April 2016, the song jumped 32 positions from number 71 to number 39, becoming Sia's fifth top forty hit and Sean Paul's thirteenth. However, in its next week, the single dropped out of the top forty down to number 55. The single continued to climb however, re-entering the top forty once again at number 38 for the chart dating 28 May 2016, where from there on, the single continued its massive climb on the Hot 100, eventually entering the top ten at number eight on the chart dating 2 July 2016. On the issue dated 6 August 2016, the song finally reached the top of the charts, dethroning "One Dance" by Drake featuring Wizkid and Kyla, which had previously spent nine consecutive weeks on the charts out of its ten total. The song became Sia's first number-one single in the country, and Sean Paul's fourth; he returned to the top 10 after 10 years. It stayed on top for four straight weeks until it was dethroned by "Closer" by The Chainsmokers featuring Halsey. The single spent 18 weeks in the top ten, and spent a total of 52 weeks (a whole year) on the Hot 100. With "Cheap Thrills," Sia became the first woman over 40 to top the Hot 100 since Madonna topped the Hot 100 with "Music" in 2000. It sold 1.7 million copies in the US in 2016, becoming the 10th best-selling song of the year in the country. It sold 1.9 million copies in the US by May 2017. It has been certified eleven times platinum for shipments of over eleven million copies.

"Cheap Thrills" was the second best-selling single of 2016 after "Can't Stop the Feeling!" by Justin Timberlake. On Spotify, "Cheap Thrills" became Sia's most streamed song on the platform with more than two billion streams (1.6 billion for the solo version and 600 million for the Sean Paul remix).

== Live performances ==
Sia has performed "Cheap Thrills" on various television shows and concerts, with a group of dancers usually led by either Maddie Ziegler or Stephanie Mincone dancing to the same choreography as in the music video, including The Tonight Show Starring Jimmy Fallon in January 2016, American Idol in March, Coachella in April, and YouTube's Brandcast event in New York City as well as the season finale of The Voice, both in May.

== Music videos ==
A lyric video featuring Sean Paul performing a new verse was released on 22 February 2016. In the video, a faceless couple wearing wigs (two dancers Minn Vo and Stefanie Klausmann), which have become part of Sia's signature look, win a dance contest on a retro 1960s black-and-white TV show reminiscent of American Bandstand or The Buddy Deane Show, using visual effects to recreate the look of early 1960s television cameras. The video, directed by Lior Molcho, has been viewed more than 1.9 billion times as of February 2026.

Sia and Daniel Askill directed a performance video featuring Maddie Ziegler dancing with two male dancers (Wyatt Rocker and Nick Lanzisera) to Ryan Heffington's choreography, which was released on 21 March 2016. A trio of dancers wear nude-coloured leotards, with black and blonde hairstyles and gloves in the half-and-half style used in most of Sia's videos for This Is Acting. They dance on a plain stage, with Sia at a rear corner in the background singing into a microphone while wearing a similar bobbed two-toned wig, a large hairbow and a white dress. Billboard wrote that "the video features the same type of intense, captivating choreography as some of [Sia's] other work. This time, Ziegler is backed by two other dancers, and the trio seems to blend as one". Teen Vogue said that Ziegler "delivers another powerful performance". The music video was nominated for Best Video at the ARIA Music Awards of 2016.

== Track listing ==
Digital download

1. "Cheap Thrills" – 3:30

Digital download - featuring Sean Paul

1. "Cheap Thrills" (feat. Sean Paul) – 3:44

Digital download - Remixes EP

1. "Cheap Thrills" (Hex Cougar Remix) – 3:49
2. "Cheap Thrills" (feat. Sean Paul) (Le Youth Remix) – 3:39
3. "Cheap Thrills" (RAC Remix) – 4:09
4. "Cheap Thrills" (Nomero Remix) – 4:11
5. "Cheap Thrills" (Sted-E & Hybrid Heights Remix) – 5:35
6. "Cheap Thrills" (Cyril Hahn Remix) – 4:45
7. "Cheap Thrills" (John J-C Carr Remix) – 5:16

Digital download - Remix (featuring Nicky Jam)

1. "Cheap Thrills" (Remix) (feat. Nicky Jam) – 3:32

== Charts ==
=== Weekly charts ===
Chart (2016–2026)	Peak position
Argentina (Monitor Latino)	1
Australia (ARIA)	6
Australia Dance (ARIA)	1
Austria (Ö3 Austria Top 40)	1
Belarus Airplay (Eurofest)	89
Belgium (Ultratop 50 Flanders)	3
Belgium (Ultratop 50 Wallonia)	1
Canada Hot 100 (Billboard)	1
Canada AC (Billboard)	1
Canada CHR/Top 40 (Billboard)	1
Canada Hot AC (Billboard)	1
Colombia (National-Report)	6
Czech Republic Airplay (ČNS IFPI)	1
Czech Republic Singles Digital (ČNS IFPI)	1
Denmark (Tracklisten)	2
Ecuador (National-Report)	4
Euro Digital Songs (Billboard)	1
Finland (Suomen virallinen lista)	4
France (SNEP)	1
France Airplay (SNEP)	1
Germany (GfK)	1
Global 200 (Billboard)	139
Greece Digital Songs (Billboard)	1
Guatemala (Monitor Latino)	3
Hungary (Rádiós Top 40)	1
Hungary (Single Top 40)	2
Hungary (Stream Top 40)	1
Iceland (RÚV)	8
Ireland (IRMA)	1
Israel International Airplay (Media Forest)	1
Italy (FIMI)	1
Lebanon (Lebanese Top 20)	2
Luxembourg Digital Songs (Billboard)	1
Mexico (Billboard Mexican Airplay)	3
Netherlands (Dutch Top 40)	3
Netherlands (Single Top 100)	3
New Zealand (Recorded Music NZ)	3
Norway (VG-lista)	3
Panama (Monitor Latino)	20
Poland Airplay (ZPAV)	2
Portugal (AFP)	1
Romania (Airplay 100)	1
Russia Airplay (Tophit)	3
Scottish Singles Sales (Official Charts)	1
Slovakia Airplay (ČNS IFPI)	1
Slovakia Singles Digital (ČNS IFPI)	1
Slovenia (SloTop50)	1
Spain (Promusicae)	1
Sweden (Sverigetopplistan)	1
Switzerland (Schweizer Hitparade)	2
Switzerland (Media Control Romandy)	1
Turkey (Radiomonitor Turkey International Chart)	1
UK Singles (Official Charts)	2
Uruguay (Monitor Latino)	13
US Billboard Hot 100	1
US Adult Contemporary (Billboard)	2
US Adult Pop Airplay (Billboard)	1
US Dance Airplay (Billboard)	6
US Dance Club Songs (Billboard)	1
US Pop Airplay (Billboard)	1
US Rhythmic Airplay (Billboard)	7
Venezuela English (Record Report)	1

=== Year-end charts ===
Chart (2016)	Position
Argentina (CAPIF)	4
Argentina (Monitor Latino)	6
Australia (ARIA)	8
Australian Dance Singles (ARIA)	5
Austria (Ö3 Austria Top 40)	2
Belgium (Ultratop Flanders)	8
Belgium (Ultratop Wallonia)	1
Brazil (Brasil Hot 100)	18
Canada (Canadian Hot 100)	3
CIS (Tophit)	40
Colombia English (National-Report)	1
Denmark (Tracklisten)	4
France (SNEP)	1
Germany (Official German Charts)	3
Hungary (Rádiós Top 40)	4
Hungary (Single Top 40)	6
Iceland (Plötutíóindi)	3
Italy (FIMI)	1
Netherlands (Dutch Top 40)	2
Netherlands (Single Top 100)	5
New Zealand (Recorded Music NZ)	8
Poland (ZPAV)	8
Romania (Airplay 100)	4
Russia Airplay (Tophit)	39
Slovenia (SloTop50)	3
Spain (PROMUSICAE)	2
Sweden (Sverigetopplistan)	2
Switzerland (Schweizer Hitparade)	2
Ukraine Airplay (Tophit)	13
UK Singles (Official Charts Company)	3
US Billboard Hot 100	11
US Adult Contemporary (Billboard)	18
US Adult Top 40 (Billboard)	4
US Dance Club Songs (Billboard)	4
US Dance/Mix Show Airplay (Billboard)	25
US Mainstream Top 40 (Billboard)	2
US Radio Songs (Billboard)	6
US Rhythmic (Billboard)	44
Venezuela English (Record Report)	3
Worldwide (IFPI)	4
Chart (2017)	Position
Brazil (Pro-Música Brasil)	140
France (SNEP)	67
Hungary (Rádiós Top 40)	16
Hungary (Single Top 40)	94
Italy (FIMI)	89
Spain (PROMUSICAE)	40
Uruguay (Monitor Latino)	54
US Adult Contemporary (Billboard)	8
US Adult Top 40 (Billboard)	43
US Radio Songs (Billboard)	50
Chart (2018)	Position
France (SNEP)	144
Chart (2024)	Position
Hungary (Rádiós Top 40)	44

=== Decade-end charts ===
Chart (2010–2019)	Position
Australia (ARIA)	83
Australian Artist Singles (ARIA)	11
Germany (Official German Charts)	11
UK Singles (Official Charts Company)	18
US Billboard Hot 100	66

== Certifications ==
Region	Certification	Certified units/sales
Australia (ARIA)	4× Platinum	280,000^{‡}
Austria (IFPI Austria)	Platinum	30,000^{‡}
Belgium (BRMA)	3× Platinum	60,000^{‡}
Canada (Music Canada)	Diamond	800,000^{‡}
Denmark (IFPI Danmark)	4× Platinum	360,000^{‡}
Germany (BVMI)	Diamond	1,000,000^{‡}
Italy (FIMI)	Diamond	500,000^{‡}
Mexico (AMPROFON)	3× Diamond+Gold	930,000^{‡}
New Zealand (RMNZ)	7× Platinum	210,000^{‡}
Poland (ZPAV)	2× Diamond	200,000^{‡}
Portugal (AFP)	2× Platinum	20,000^{‡}
Spain (Promusicae)	5× Platinum	200,000^{‡}
Sweden (GLF)	4× Platinum	160,000^{‡}
United Kingdom (BPI)	6× Platinum	3,600,000^{‡}
United States (RIAA)	11× Platinum	11,000,000^{‡}
Summaries
Worldwide	—	11,100,000
^{‡} Sales+streaming figures based on certification alone.

== See also ==
- Greg Kurstin production discography
- List of Airplay 100 number ones of the 2010s
- List of best-selling singles
- List of number-one dance singles of 2016 (U.S.)
- List of Billboard Hot 100 number-one singles of 2016
- List of Billboard Hot 100 top 10 singles in 2016
