= List of Billboard Hot 100 number ones of 2016 =

Music performance chart

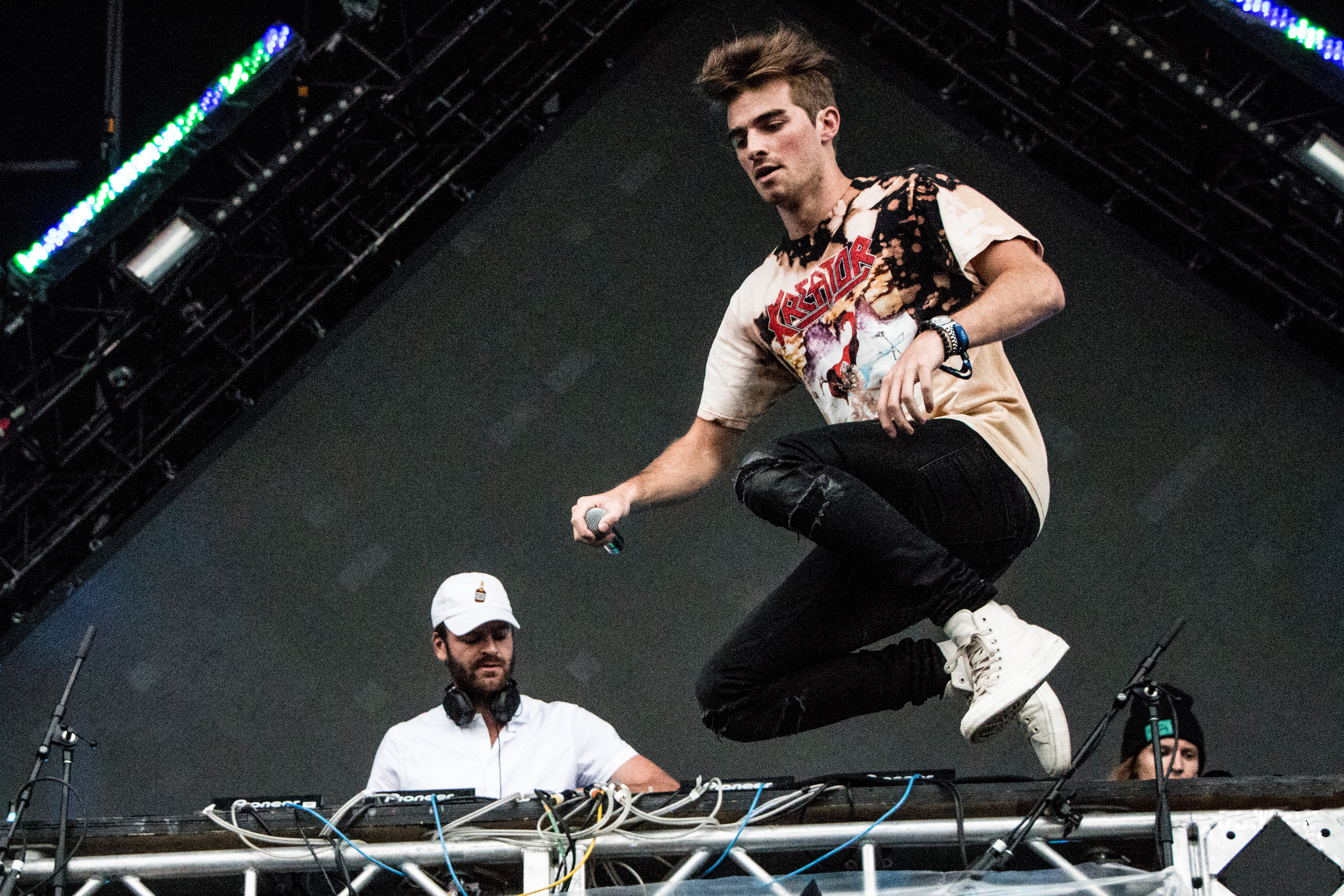
"Closer" by The Chainsmokers (pictured) featuring Halsey spent twelve weeks at number one, becoming the longest-running number one single of the year.

The Billboard Hot 100 is a chart that ranks the best-performing singles of the United States. Its data, published by Billboard magazine and compiled by Nielsen SoundScan, is based collectively on each single's weekly physical and digital sales, as well as airplay and streaming.

During 2016, ten singles reached number one on the Hot 100; an eleventh single, "Hello" by Adele, began its run at number one in November 2015. Of those ten number-one singles, five were collaborations. In total, fourteen acts topped the chart as either lead or featured artists, with nine—Zayn, Desiigner, Wizkid, Kyla, Sia, The Chainsmokers, Halsey, Rae Sremmurd and Gucci Mane—achieving their first Hot 100 number-one single. The Chainsmokers and Halsey's "Closer" was the longest-running number-one of the year, leading the chart for twelve weeks; despite this, Justin Bieber's "Love Yourself" topped the Billboard Year-End Hot 100.

== Chart history ==
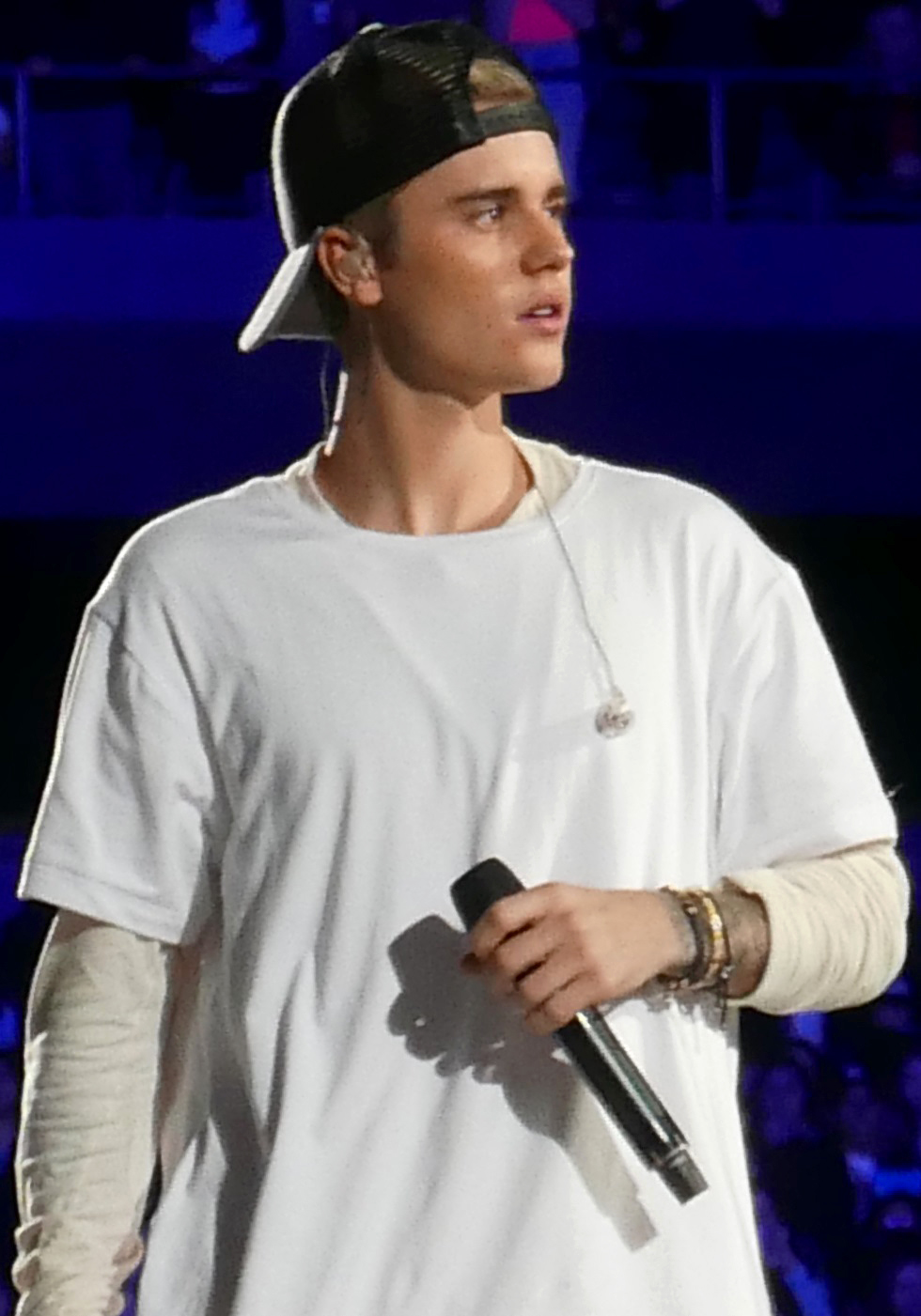
Justin Bieber (pictured) scored two number-one singles with "Sorry" and "Love Yourself". The latter song became the number-one song on the Billboard Year-End Hot 100 of 2016.

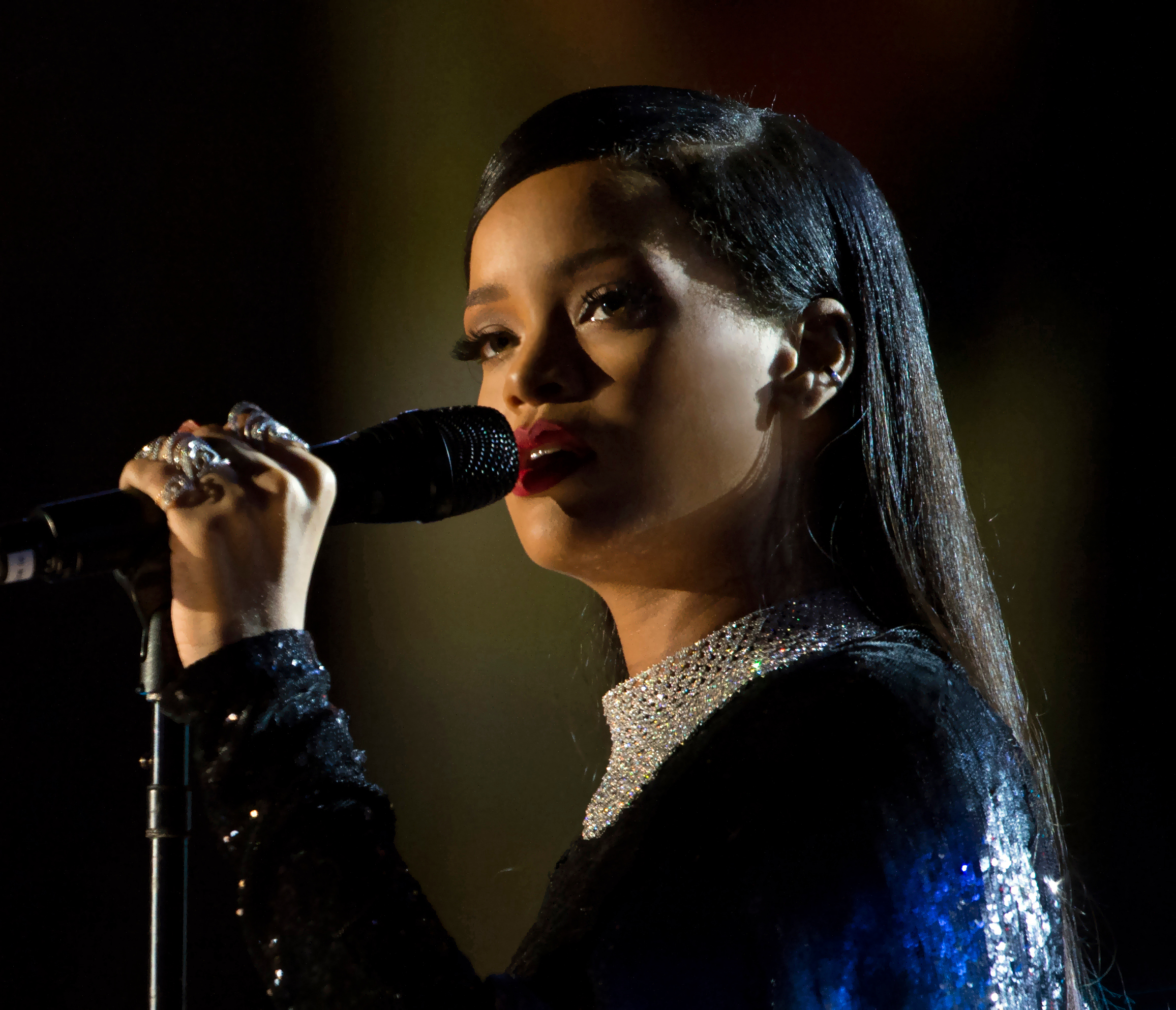
With "Work", Rihanna (pictured) earned her 14th number-one single on the chart, allowing her to surpass Michael Jackson for third most in the Hot 100 era.

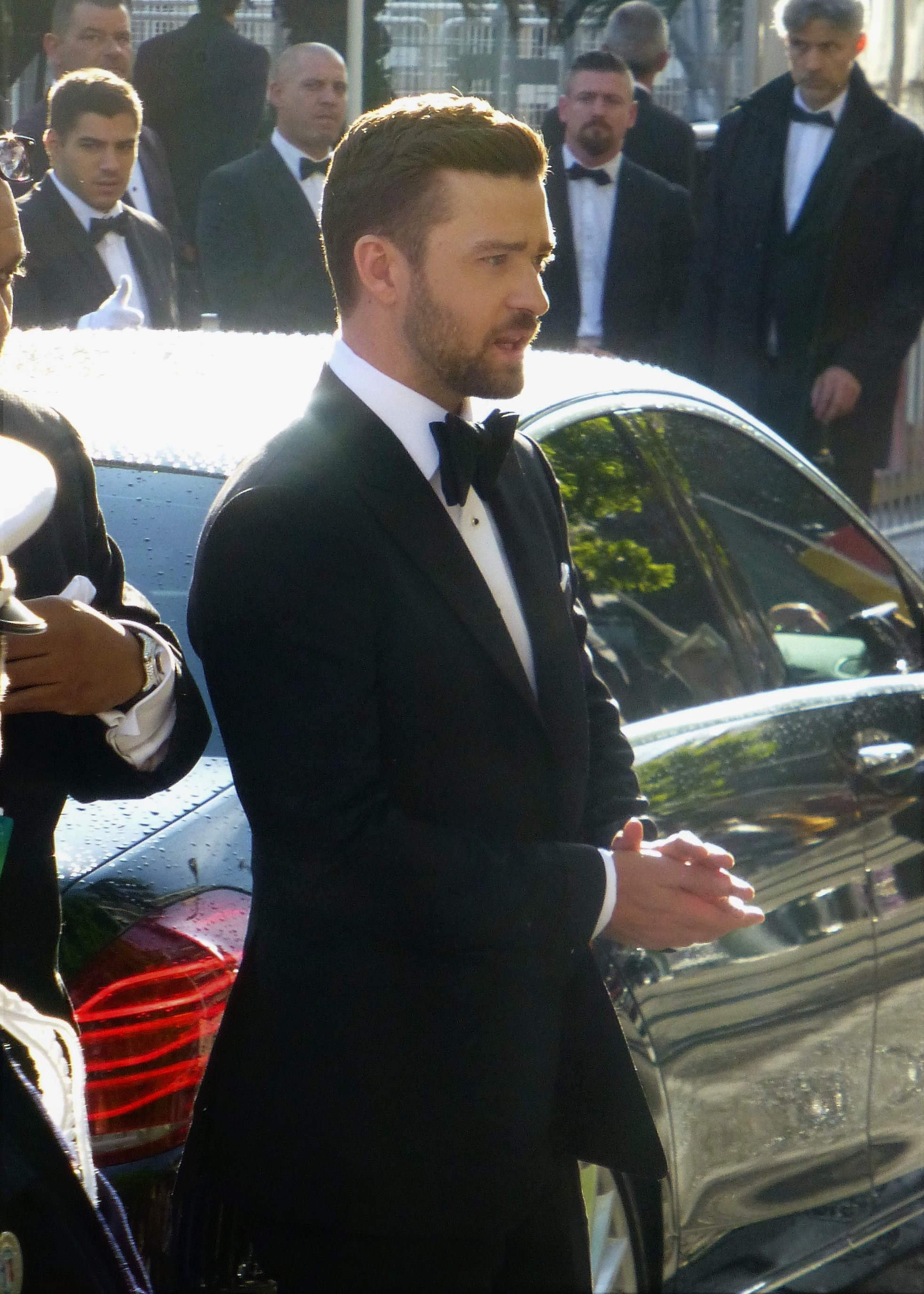
Justin Timberlake (pictured) debuted at number one with "Can't Stop the Feeling!", becoming the twenty-sixth song to do so, and the fifth Timberlake song to top the Billboard Hot 100.

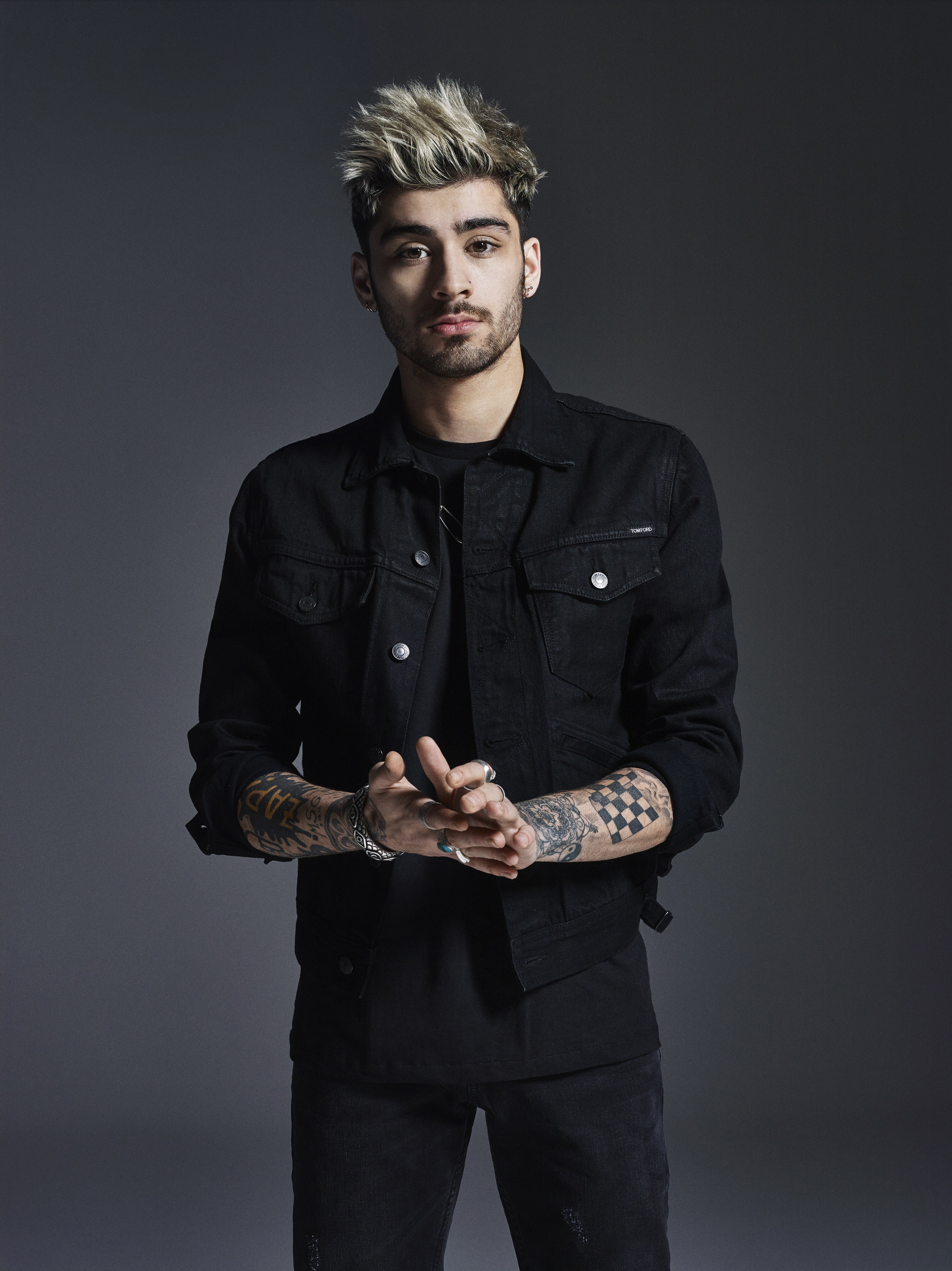
Zayn became the first UK artist to debut at number one on the Hot 100 with a first charted single: "Pillowtalk".

Key
†	Indicates best-performing single of 2016

No.	Issue date	Song	Artist(s)	Ref.
1048	January 2	"Hello"	Adele	
1048	January 9	"Hello"	Adele	
1048	January 16	"Hello"	Adele	
1049	January 23	"Sorry"	Justin Bieber	
1049	January 30	"Sorry"	Justin Bieber	
1049	February 6	"Sorry"	Justin Bieber	
1050	February 13	"Love Yourself" †	Justin Bieber	
1051	February 20	"Pillowtalk"	Zayn	
re	February 27	"Love Yourself" †	Justin Bieber	
1052	March 5	"Work"	Rihanna featuring Drake	
1052	March 12	"Work"	Rihanna featuring Drake	
1052	March 19	"Work"	Rihanna featuring Drake	
1052	March 26	"Work"	Rihanna featuring Drake	
1052	April 2	"Work"	Rihanna featuring Drake	
1052	April 9	"Work"	Rihanna featuring Drake	
1052	April 16	"Work"	Rihanna featuring Drake	
1052	April 23	"Work"	Rihanna featuring Drake	
1052	April 30	"Work"	Rihanna featuring Drake	
1053	May 7	"Panda"	Desiigner	
1053	May 14	"Panda"	Desiigner	
1054	May 21	"One Dance"	Drake featuring Wizkid and Kyla	
1055	May 28	"Can't Stop the Feeling!"	Justin Timberlake	
re	June 4	"One Dance"	Drake featuring Wizkid and Kyla	
re	June 11	"One Dance"	Drake featuring Wizkid and Kyla	
re	June 18	"One Dance"	Drake featuring Wizkid and Kyla	
re	June 25	"One Dance"	Drake featuring Wizkid and Kyla	
re	July 2	"One Dance"	Drake featuring Wizkid and Kyla	
re	July 9	"One Dance"	Drake featuring Wizkid and Kyla	
re	July 16	"One Dance"	Drake featuring Wizkid and Kyla	
re	July 23	"One Dance"	Drake featuring Wizkid and Kyla	
re	July 30	"One Dance"	Drake featuring Wizkid and Kyla	
1056	August 6	"Cheap Thrills"	Sia featuring Sean Paul	
1056	August 13	"Cheap Thrills"	Sia featuring Sean Paul	
1056	August 20	"Cheap Thrills"	Sia featuring Sean Paul	
1056	August 27	"Cheap Thrills"	Sia featuring Sean Paul	
1057	September 3	"Closer"	The Chainsmokers featuring Halsey	
1057	September 10	"Closer"	The Chainsmokers featuring Halsey	
1057	September 17	"Closer"	The Chainsmokers featuring Halsey	
1057	September 24	"Closer"	The Chainsmokers featuring Halsey	
1057	October 1	"Closer"	The Chainsmokers featuring Halsey	
1057	October 8	"Closer"	The Chainsmokers featuring Halsey	
1057	October 15	"Closer"	The Chainsmokers featuring Halsey	
1057	October 22	"Closer"	The Chainsmokers featuring Halsey	
1057	October 29	"Closer"	The Chainsmokers featuring Halsey	
1057	November 5	"Closer"	The Chainsmokers featuring Halsey	
1057	November 12	"Closer"	The Chainsmokers featuring Halsey	
1057	November 19	"Closer"	The Chainsmokers featuring Halsey	
1058	November 26	"Black Beatles"	Rae Sremmurd featuring Gucci Mane	
1058	December 3	"Black Beatles"	Rae Sremmurd featuring Gucci Mane	
1058	December 10	"Black Beatles"	Rae Sremmurd featuring Gucci Mane	
1058	December 17	"Black Beatles"	Rae Sremmurd featuring Gucci Mane	
1058	December 24	"Black Beatles"	Rae Sremmurd featuring Gucci Mane	
1058	December 31	"Black Beatles"	Rae Sremmurd featuring Gucci Mane	

== Number-one artists ==
List of number-one artists by total weeks at number one
Position	Artist	Weeks at No. 1
1	Drake	19
2	The Chainsmokers	12
2	Halsey	12
4	Wizkid	10
4	Kyla	10
6	Rihanna	9
7	Rae Sremmurd	6
7	Gucci Mane	6
9	Justin Bieber	5
10	Sia	4
10	Sean Paul	4
12	Adele	3
13	Desiigner	2
14	Zayn	1
14	Justin Timberlake	1

== See also ==
- 2016 in American music
- List of Billboard 200 number-one albums of 2016
- List of Billboard Hot 100 top-ten singles in 2016
- List of Billboard Hot 100 number-one singles of the 2010s
