= One Dance =

2016 single by Drake

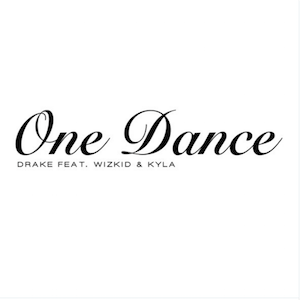

Single by Drake featuring Wizkid and Kyla

from the album Views
- Released: April 5, 2016
- Recorded: 2015
- Genre: Pop; Dancehall; Afrobeats
- Length: 2:53
- Label: Young Money; Cash Money; Republic
- Songwriters: Aubrey Graham; Ayodeji Balogun; Kyla Smith; Paul Jefferies; Noah Shebib; Errol Reid; Luke Reid; Corey Johnson; Logan Sama
- Producers: Nineteen85; 40; WizKid; Sarz; DJ Maphorisa

Drake singles chronology
"Come and See Me" (2016)	"One Dance" and "Pop Style" (2016)	"Why You Always Hatin?" (2016)

Wizkid singles chronology
"Erima" (2016)	"One Dance" (2016)	"Mamacita" (2016)

Kyla singles chronology
"Do You Mind" (2008)	"One Dance" (2016)	"Should've Been Me" (2016)

"One Dance" is a song by Canadian rapper Drake from his fourth studio album Views (2016). It features guest vocals from Nigerian afrobeats artist Wizkid and British singer Kyla. The artists co-wrote the dancehall and afrobeats song with its co-producers Nineteen85, DJ Maphorisa and Noah "40" Shebib, with production assistance from Wizkid. Crazy Cousinz and Kyla received songwriting credits for the sampling of their 2008 UK funky song "Do You Mind".

"One Dance" was released for digital download on April 5, 2016, and was serviced to US urban, rhythmic, and contemporary hit radio on April 12, 2016. "One Dance" was released shortly after the release date for Views was announced, alongside "Pop Style". "One Dance" was the first of three dancehall singles to be released from Views, along with "Controlla" and "Too Good".

"One Dance" reached number one in 15 countries, including Australia, Canada, France, Germany, Ireland, the Netherlands, New Zealand, Switzerland, the United Kingdom - where it later also became the longest running top 10 single of the 2010s decade in the region, and the United States, becoming Drake's first number-one single in all 15 countries as the lead artist. It topped the US Billboard Hot 100 for 10 non-consecutive weeks and became the joint-second longest consecutive number one in the UK Singles Chart with 15 consecutive weeks at the summit. Featured artist Wizkid became the first Nigerian artist to (chart on and) top the US Billboard Hot 100. "One Dance" became the second dancehall song of 2016 to top the Billboard Hot 100 after Rihanna's "Work" which also featured Drake.

On September 7, 2016, Billboard named "One Dance" the 2016 Song of the Summer. As of December 2016, it has sold 2 million copies in the US, thus being the fifth-best-selling song of the year. For Apple Music it was the best performing song of the year. On October 15, 2016, "One Dance" became the most played song ever on streaming media service Spotify, with over one billion individual streams, overtaking the previous record held by Major Lazer and DJ Snake's "Lean On". Ed Sheeran's "Shape of You" overtook "One Dance" as the most streamed song on Spotify on September 21, 2017. "One Dance" was the best-performing single worldwide of 2016 and is one of the best-selling digital singles of all-time.

== Background and release ==
In early 2016, UK funky artist Kyla was first contacted by Drake's production team regarding the use of her 2008 song "Do You Mind (Crazy Cousinz remix)", in a new afrobeats and dancehall song with Drake and Nigerian artist Wizkid, whom Drake had met one year previously through British grime artist Skepta, to work on a remix of Wizkid's song Ojuelegba. Drake had reportedly been a fan of Kyla's song for several years and so convinced his producer Nineteen85 to use "Do You Mind (Crazy Cousinz remix)" as a bridge within their new song. "Do You Mind" was subsequently worked on by South African DJ Maphorisa who slowed down its tempo before adding Wizkid's background vocals. Production of "One Dance" was finished within one week and quickly released in early April 2016 due to fear of it being leaked, which had occurred with Drake's "Controlla"'s original version featuring Jamaican dancehall artist Popcaan in March 2016. In addition to Wizkid's work on "One Dance", Drake provided vocals for the Wizkid track "Come Closer", which was recorded at the same time, but released a year later in March 2017.

Drake and his team were unsure over how "One Dance" would be received upon being released since they considered it to be a considerable shift from his previous work. They therefore decided on it being released jointly with the song "Pop Style", featuring The Throne (Kanye West and Jay Z), since they felt it was a more conventional rap record and would therefore cushion the criticism had it been negative.

== Composition and recording ==
"One Dance" is a dancehall, pop and UK funky song with a length of two minutes and fifty-four seconds. The song is Drake's first dancehall single as the lead artist, having previously explored the genre in his 2015 mixtape, If You're Reading This It's Too Late and in the January 2016 single "Work" with Rihanna. The single marks the second time Drake has worked on an afrobeats song, having previously featured on Wizkid's "Ojuelegba (Remix)" (2015) along with British grime artist Skepta.

According to the sheet music published at Musicnotes.com, "One Dance" is written in the key of B♭ minor and has a tempo of 104 beats per minute in common time. The song follows a chord progression of B♭m – D♭ – E♭m, and Drake's vocals span from A♭_{2} to B♭_{3.}

== Critical reception ==
Jon Caramanica of The New York Times wrote "One Dance" is a transnational dance-floor lullaby, one of Drake's breeziest and most accessible songs, and also one of his savviest." Pitchfork stated of the song: "Kyla's voice and that resonant piano mash are the first things heard before they cave into a throbbing, wine-worthy tropical thumper. The message is as simple as the beat is mesmerizing: "One Dance" is about the spiritual connection two people can have in a club, when vibrations charge the air and they lose themselves. Drake's verses drift while Wizkid's echoing chirps melt into the fabric of the rhythm. In the closing seconds, a series of tones and polyrhythms collapse in on one another as Kyla's croons give way the Drake's once more. It feels symbolic of the full-fledged multiculturalism on display." Luke Morgan Britton of NME called "One Dance" a "dancehall-indebted dancefloor-filler, the size of which we've not heard since 'Hotline Bling'." Similarly, Mikael Wood of Los Angeles Times praised the song's "swirl warm, bubbly dance styles from Africa and the Caribbean".

=== Accolades ===
"One Dance" was placed at number three on Rob Sheffield's list of "50 Best Songs of 2016" in Rolling Stone, describing it as a "tropical summer jam with a Caribbean lilt that evokes Lionel Richie in pastel-shirt mode. When he mixes in Nigerian singer Wizkid and London diva Kyla, he turns "One Dance" into a utopian fusion of global styles, by way of Toronto." Billboard ranked "One Dance" at number seven on their "100 Best Pop Songs of 2016" list: "With a molasses-sweet-and-slow Kyla hook (lifted from her own "Do You Mind?") and a bouncing, piano-led dancehall groove so hypnotic not even a midsong round of gunfire could break its spell, the tropical track served as an infinitely repeatable summer jam." Pitchfork considered it the 30th best song of the year, and NME the 17th. In the annual Village Voice's Pazz & Jop mass critics poll of the year's best in music in 2016, "One Dance" was ranked at number 15.

== Commercial performance ==
=== United Kingdom ===
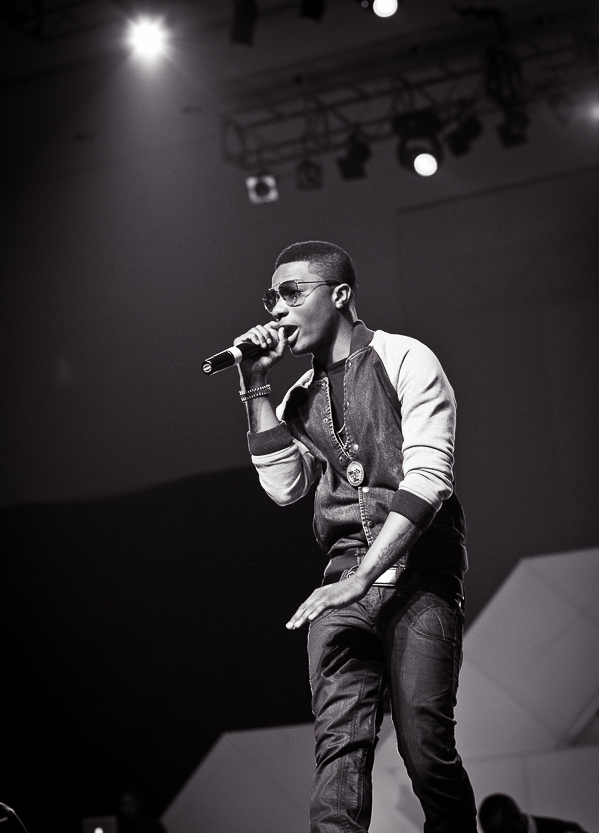
Nigerian artist Wizkid was involved in the writing and production of "One Dance"

In the United Kingdom, "One Dance" debuted at number 21 on the UK Singles Chart on April 8, 2016—for the week ending date April 14, 2016—with just three days of sales. The following week, the single jumped twenty spaces to the top of the chart, becoming Drake's second number-one single in Britain, and first as a lead artist, having previously peaked at the top in collaboration with Rihanna on "What's My Name?" in January 2011. Furthermore, "One Dance" became Kyla's first chart-topping song in her home country. In its ninth week at number-one, it gained the lowest ever paid-for sales for a number-one single, with just 16,903 downloads. The following week, on its tenth week at the top, it sold even less, with just 13,152 paid-for sales; it also equalled Rihanna's 10 week reign with "Umbrella" in 2007 to become the longest-lasting number one single of the century. It remained at number one for 15 consecutive weeks, tying with Wet Wet Wet's "Love Is All Around" as the second longest consecutive number-one hit in UK chart history and behind only "(Everything I Do) I Do It for You" by Bryan Adams. The song was later replaced at the top by Major Lazer's "Cold Water" on the week of August 4, 2016. It was later named the best-selling single of 2016 in the United Kingdom, selling a total of 1.95 million combined units consisting of 530,000 digital copies and 142 million streams. As of September 2017, the song has gained 554,000 copies in sales, 179 million in streams, making a total of 2,345,000 combined units.

=== United States ===
In the United States, the single debuted at number 21 on the Billboard Hot 100 for the week ending April 23, 2016. The following week (April 30, 2016), it moved to number 13. It sold 104,000 copies during its first week of release, debuting at four on the US Digital Songs chart. The song reached number one on the Digital Songs chart the following week, its sales increasing by 14% to 119,000 copies, becoming Drake's seventh leader on the chart. In its third week (May 7, 2016), "One Dance" jumped to number three, aided by large gains on radio and streaming. In its fourth week (May 14, 2016), it climbed to number two, tying with "Best I Ever Had" and "Hotline Bling" as Drake's highest-charting Billboard Hot 100 singles as a lead artist. In the next week (May 21, 2016), the song topped the chart, making it Drake's first number one on the chart as a lead artist. In the next week (May 28, 2016), "One Dance" fell to number two on the US Billboard Hot 100 behind Justin Timberlake's "Can't Stop the Feeling!" but regained the spot the week after (June 4, 2016) for an additional nine weeks until it was knocked off by Sia's "Cheap Thrills" on the week ending August 6, 2016. On the issue dated July 30, 2016, "One Dance" became the 32nd song to top the Billboard Hot 100 for at least ten weeks. As of December 2016, "One Dance" sold 2 million copies in the US, thus being the fifth best-selling song of the year, behind Lukas Graham's "7 Years", Flo Rida's "My House", The Chainsmokers' "Closer" and Justin Timberlake's "Can't Stop the Feeling!".

=== Canada ===
In his native Canada, the single debuted at number 13 on the Canadian Hot 100 on the week of April 23, 2016 and moved up to number two on the week of April 30, 2016. On the week of May 7, 2016, Drake received his first number-one as the lead artist in his native Canada, having previously peaked at the top in collaboration with Rihanna on "Work" in March 2016.

== Lack of music video ==
David Bakula, Nielsen's SVP of Analytics said in an interview that "If a song is going to reach that pinnacle of success, it's got to be everywhere". However, the lack of a music video for "One Dance" contributed to its success in countries where YouTube streams do not influence the singles charts, such as in the UK, as those wanting to listen to "One Dance" were forced to stream it on services such as Spotify or Apple Music, which do count towards the singles charts.

A scene with "One Dance" featured on the short film Please Forgive Me directed by Anthony Mandler, released on September 26, 2016, exclusively on Apple Music. The short film was produced in South Africa. Material Culture, part of the country's dance battle subculture, is part of the dance crew.

== Performances and remixes ==
Drake gave his first live performance of "One Dance" on April 14, 2016, in Toronto during Rihanna's Anti World Tour. Drake later promoted the song, along with "Hype" from Views, on NBC's Saturday Night Live on May 14, 2016. "One Dance" was later performed during Drake's Summer Sixteen Tour (2016) and was performed during his Boy Meets World Tour (2017).

A remix of the song, featuring lead vocals by Canadian singer Justin Bieber, premiered on Drake's Beats 1 radio show OVO Sound on June 4, 2016, but was never released to music outlets or mainstream music sites.

A Greek Easter parody of the song, titled "One Lamb," was released by Greek-American parody artist So Tiri and musical artist Annet Artani on the former's YouTube channel on April 16, 2017.

"One Dance" is sampled in Palestinian rapper Saint Levant's 2022 song "Baby".

== Charts ==
=== Weekly charts ===
2016–2017 weekly chart performance for "One Dance"
Chart (2016–2017)	Peak position
Argentina (CAPIF)	5
Argentina Airplay (Monitor Latino)	4
Australia (ARIA)	1
Austria (Ö3 Austria Top 40)	3
Belgium (Ultratop 50 Flanders)	1
Belgium (Ultratop 50 Wallonia)	2
Canada Hot 100 (Billboard)	1
Czech Republic Singles Digital (ČNS IFPI)	3
Denmark (Tracklisten)	2
Euro Digital Song Sales (Billboard)	1
Finland (Suomen virallinen lista)	2
France (SNEP)	1
Germany (GfK)	1
Hungary (Rádiós Top 40)	12
Hungary (Single Top 40)	18
Hungary (Stream Top 40)	5
Ireland (IRMA)	1
Israel International Airplay (Media Forest)	2
Italy (FIMI)	6
Lebanon (Lebanese Top 20)	1
Mexico Airplay (Billboard)	5
Netherlands (Dutch Top 40)	1
Netherlands (Global Top 40)	2
Netherlands (Single Top 100)	1
New Zealand (Recorded Music NZ)	1
Norway (VG-lista)	1
Panama Airplay (Monitor Latino)	9
Paraguay Airplay (Monitor Latino)	12
Portugal (AFP)	1
Romania Airplay (Media Forest)	6
Scottish Singles Sales (Official Charts)	2
Slovakia Singles Digital (ČNS IFPI)	29
South Africa Airplay (EMA)	2
Spain (Promusicae)	2
Sweden (Sverigetopplistan)	1
Switzerland (Schweizer Hitparade)	1
UK Singles (Official Charts)	1
UK Hip Hop/R&B (Official Charts)	1
US Billboard Hot 100	1
US Adult Pop Airplay (Billboard)	20
US Dance Airplay (Billboard)	3
US Hot R&B/Hip-Hop Songs (Billboard)	1
US Latin Pop Airplay (Billboard)	25
US Pop Airplay (Billboard)	1
US Rhythmic Airplay (Billboard)	1

2023–2026 weekly chart performance for "One Dance"
Chart (2023–2026)	Peak position
Global 200 (Billboard)	43
Latvia Airplay (TopHit)	95

=== Year-end charts ===
2016 year-end chart performance for "One Dance"
Chart (2016)	Position
Argentina (Monitor Latino)	13
Australia (ARIA)	2
Austria (Ö3 Austria Top 40)	10
Belgium (Ultratop Flanders)	2
Belgium (Ultratop Wallonia)	4
Canada (Canadian Hot 100)	4
Denmark (Tracklisten)	3
France (SNEP)	2
Germany (Official German Charts)	5
Hungary (Single Top 40)	52
Iceland (Plötutíóindi)	18
Israel (Media Forest)	11
Italy (FIMI)	8
Netherlands (Dutch Top 40)	3
Netherlands (Single Top 100)	1
New Zealand (Recorded Music NZ)	1
Spain (PROMUSICAE)	7
Sweden (Sverigetopplistan)	3
Switzerland (Schweizer Hitparade)	3
UK Singles (OCC)	1
US Billboard Hot 100	3
US Dance/Mix Show Airplay (Billboard)	10
US Hot R&B/Hip-Hop Songs (Billboard)	1
US Mainstream Top 40 (Billboard)	7
US Rhythmic (Billboard)	1
Worldwide (IFPI)	1

2017 year-end chart performance for "One Dance"
Chart (2017)	Position
Brazil (Pro-Música Brasil)	101
France (SNEP)	76
Portugal (AFP)	77
UK Singles (OCC)	80

2024 year-end chart performance for "One Dance"
Chart (2024)	Position
Global 200 (Billboard)	167

=== Decade-end charts ===
Decade-end chart performance for "One Dance"
Chart (2010–2019)	Position
Australia (ARIA)	39
Germany (Official German Charts)	19
Netherlands (Single Top 100)	14
UK Singles (OCC)	6
US Billboard Hot 100	35
US Hot R&B/Hip-Hop Songs (Billboard)	7

=== All-time charts ===
All-time chart performance for "One Dance"
Chart	Position
US Billboard Hot 100 (1958–2018)	141

== Certifications ==
Certifications for "One Dance"
Region	Certification	Certified units/sales
Australia (ARIA)	17× Platinum	1,190,000^{‡}
Belgium (BRMA)	3× Platinum	60,000^{‡}
Brazil (Pro-Música Brasil)	Diamond	250,000^{‡}
Canada (Music Canada)	Diamond	800,000^{‡}
Denmark (IFPI Danmark)	6× Platinum	540,000^{‡}
France (SNEP)	Diamond	233,333^{‡}
Germany (BVMI)	Diamond	1,500,000^{‡}
Italy (FIMI)	6× Platinum	300,000^{‡}
Mexico (AMPROFON)	4× Platinum+Gold	270,000^{‡}
New Zealand (RMNZ)	10× Platinum	300,000^{‡}
Poland (ZPAV)	3× Platinum	150,000^{‡}
Portugal (AFP)	8× Platinum	80,000^{‡}
Spain (Promusicae)	5× Platinum	200,000^{‡}
Sweden (GLF)	7× Platinum	280,000^{‡}
United Kingdom (BPI)	8× Platinum	4,800,000^{‡}
United States (RIAA)	15× Platinum	15,000,000^{‡}
Streaming
Greece (IFPI Greece)	3× Platinum	6,000,000^{†}
^{‡} Sales+streaming figures based on certification alone.^{†} Streaming-only figures based on certification alone.

== Release history ==
Release history and formats for "One Dance"
Region	Date	Format	Label	Ref.
Various	April 5, 2016	Digital download	Young Money; Cash Money; Republic	
United States	April 12, 2016	Contemporary hit radio	Young Money; Cash Money; Republic	
United States	April 12, 2016	Rhythmic contemporary	Young Money; Cash Money; Republic	
United States	April 12, 2016	Urban contemporary	Young Money; Cash Money; Republic	

== See also ==
- List of best-selling singles
- List of best-selling singles in Australia
- List of best-selling singles in the United Kingdom
- List of number-one singles of 2016 (Australia)
- List of Ultratop 50 number-one singles of 2016
- List of Canadian Hot 100 number-one singles of 2016
- List of number-one hits of 2016 (France)
- List of number-one hits of 2016 (Germany)
- List of number-one singles of 2016 (Ireland)
- List of Dutch Top 40 number-one singles of 2016
- List of number-one singles from the 2010s (New Zealand)
- List of number-one songs in Norway
- List of number-one singles of 2016 (Portugal)
- List of number-one singles of the 2010s (Sweden)
- List of number-one hits of 2016 (Switzerland)
- List of UK Singles Chart number ones of 2016
- List of UK R&B Singles Chart number ones of 2016
- List of Billboard Hot 100 number-one singles of 2016
- List of Hot 100 Airplay number-one singles of the 2010s
- List of number-one digital songs of 2016 (U.S.)
- List of Billboard Mainstream Top 40 number-one songs of 2016
- List of number-one Billboard Streaming Songs of 2016
- List of most streamed songs on Spotify
- List of most streamed songs in the United Kingdom
