= Kyla (British singer) =

British house singer (born 1983)

- Also known as: Kyla Reid
- Born: Kyla Smith; 22 September 1983 (age 43); Germany
- Origin: Felixstowe, Suffolk, United Kingdom
- Genres: House; UK funky
- Occupations: Singer; songwriter; musician
- Years active: 2008–present
- Spouse: DJ Paleface (m. 2022)

Kyla Reid (née Smith; born 22 September 1983) is a British singer associated with the UK funky subgenre. She is best known for the song "Do You Mind" which was later sampled in Drake's biggest hit "One Dance".

== Career ==
Kyla featured on the Crazy Cousinz UK funky song "Do You Mind", released in 2008, which peaked at number 48 on the UK Singles Chart in 2009. DJ Paleface liked Kyla's voice after seeing her in a video for the song "Be What I Wanna Be".

In early 2016, Kyla was first contacted by Drake's production team regarding the use of her 2008 song "Do You Mind" in a new afrobeats and dancehall-infused song with Drake and Nigerian artist Wizkid. The song, "One Dance", was quickly produced and released in early April 2016, due to fear of it being leaked, and became an international hit, reaching number 1 in the singles chart in 15 different countries, including her native UK, the US and Drake's native Canada.

The success of "One Dance" allowed Kyla to reboot her career, with guest appearances in a number of 2016 British summer music festivals, including the Wireless Festival. Kyla was later featured on English producer Naughty Boy's single, "Should've Been Me", which was released in November 2016 and peaked at number 61 on the UK Singles Chart. She was later featured on another single by producer Zac Samuel, "Play It Cool".

Kyla released her first single as a lead artist, called "You Ain't Mine", featuring dancehall artist Popcaan, on 15 September 2017.

== Personal life ==
Kyla was born in Germany to a father of Jamaican and English heritage; and a mother of American heritage/citizenship with "Native American somewhere and Chinese down the line". Kyla and her family moved to the UK at the age of 6. Kyla is married to Errol Reid (also known as DJ Paleface, one half of the Crazy Cousinz production team) and has two sons, one of whom gained Internet notoriety in 2026 after performing a dance routine that would go on to become an online meme. Kyla gave up her music career to start a family. She was previously an ESL teacher.

== Discography ==
=== Charted singles ===
==== As lead artist ====
Title	Year	Peak chart positions		Certifications	Album
Title	Year	UK	IRE	Certifications	Album
"Do You Mind"	2008	48	42	BPI: Gold	Non-album single

==== As featured artist ====
Title	Year	Peak chart positions						Certifications	Album
Title	Year	UK	AUS	CAN	IRE	NZ	US	Certifications	Album
"One Dance" (Drake featuring Wizkid and Kyla)	2016	1	1	1	1	1	1	ARIA: 17× Platinum; BPI: 8× Platinum; MC: Diamond; RIAA: Diamond; RMNZ: 10× Platinum; SNEP: Diamond	Views
"Should've Been Me" (Naughty Boy featuring Popcaan and Kyla)	2016	61	—	—	61	—	—	BPI: Silver	Non-album single
"Hello Mate" (ArrDee featuring Kyla)	2022	37	—	—	—	—	—		Pier Pressure
