= Un peu de nous =

Compilation album by Celine Dion
- Released: 21 July 2017
- Recorded: 1991–2016
- Genre: Pop
- Length: 167:10
- Language: French; English
- Label: Columbia
- Producer: Walter Afanasieff; Erick Benzi; Thierry Blanchard; Ludovic Carquet; David Foster; David Gategno; Humberto Gatica; Jean-Jacques Goldman; Patrick Hampartzoumian; Luc Leroy; Silvio Lisbonne; Yann Macé; Therry Marie-Louise; Max Martin; Christopher Neil; Serge Perathoner; Scott Price; Julien Schultheis; Sham & Motesart; Jim Steinman; Jannick Top; Jacques Veneruso; Ric Wake; Rami Yacoub; Zaho

Celine Dion chronology
Encore un soir (2016)	Un peu de nous (2017)	The Best So Far... 2018 Tour Edition (2018)

Un peu de nous (lit. 'A little about us') is a primarily French-language compilation album by Canadian singer Celine Dion. It was released by Columbia Records on 21 July 2017 in France and on 28 July 2017 in Belgium's Wallonia. The three-CD set includes studio versions of songs performed by Dion during her 2017 tour on two discs, as well as instrumental versions of selected tracks on the third disc. The title Un peu de nous is taken from the lyrics of the song "Encore un soir". The album topped the chart in France, where it was certified gold, and reached number six in Wallonia.

== Content ==
The album includes studio versions of songs that Dion performed during her Celine Dion Live 2017 tour. It includes French-language hits such as "Pour que tu m'aimes encore", "Je sais pas", "Encore un soir", "S'il suffisait d'aimer", "On ne change pas", and "Un garçon pas comme les autres (Ziggy)". Un peu de nous also includes several English-language hits, including "My Heart Will Go On" and "Because You Loved Me". The third disc contains instrumental versions of selected tracks.

== Commercial performance ==
Un peu de nous debuted at number one in France with 13,056 copies sold in its first week. It remained at the top for a second week, selling 12,420 units. In the third week, the album again held the number-one position, selling an additional 12,000 copies. During the fourth week, Un peu de nous stayed at number one on the Sales Chart with 7,697 units sold, although it dropped to number two on the Sales/Streaming Chart. In the fifth week, the album sold 4,587 copies and fell to number three on the Sales Chart and number 10 on the Sales/Streaming Chart.

One month after release, Un peu de nous had sold 50,000 copies in France and was certified gold on 25 August 2017. In the sixth week, the album dropped to number eight on the Sales Chart and number 17 on the Sales/Streaming Chart, selling 3,511 units. The following week, it fell to number nine on the Sales Chart and number 21 on the Sales/Streaming Chart, selling 3,084 units and bringing total sales to 56,355 copies. By the end of 2017, the album had sold 80,082 copies in France. It also reached number six in Belgium's Wallonia.

== Track listing ==
Disc one
No.	Title	Writer(s)	Producer(s)	Length
1.	"Dans un autre monde"	Jean-Jacques Goldman	Goldman; Erick Benzi	4:38
2.	"Terre"	Benzi	Goldman; Benzi	4:17
3.	"L'étoile"	Grand Corps Malade; Manon Romiti; Silvio Lisbonne; Florent Mothe	Lisbonne; Tiborg^{[a]}	3:14
4.	"Ordinaire"	Claudine Monfette; Robert Charlebois; Pierre Nadeau	Scott Price; Humberto Gatica	4:44
5.	"On ne change pas"	Goldman	Goldman; Benzi	4:08
6.	"Je sais pas"	Goldman; J. Kapler	Goldman; Benzi	4:34
7.	"Immensité"	Nina Bouraoui; Jacques Veneruso	Veneruso; Patrick Hampartzoumian	3:34
8.	"Et je t'aime encore"	Goldman; Kapler	Benzi	3:26
9.	"Zora sourit"	Goldman; Kapler	Goldman; Benzi	3:51
10.	"Si c'était à refaire"	Alice Guiol; Veneruso	Veneruso; Thierry Blanchard	3:52
11.	"À vous"	Zaho; Ludovic Carquet; Therry Marie-Louise	Zaho; Carquet; Marie-Louise	3:46
12.	"Le ballet"	Goldman	Goldman; Benzi	4:26
13.	"Loved Me Back to Life"	Hasham Hussain; Denarius Motes; Sia Furler	Sham & Motesart; Hussain^{[b]}	3:50
14.	"Because You Loved Me"	Diane Warren	David Foster	4:33
Total length:				56:53

Disc two
No.	Title	Writer(s)	Producer(s)	Length
1.	"S'il suffisait d'aimer"	Goldman	Goldman; Benzi	3:35
2.	"Un garçon pas comme les autres (Ziggy)"	Luc Plamondon; Michel Berger	Jannick Top; Serge Perathoner	2:57
3.	"Tous les blues sont écrits pour toi"	Goldman	Goldman; Benzi	4:48
4.	"Refuse to Dance"	Charlie Dore; Danny Schogger	Christopher Neil	4:21
5.	"Love Is All We Need"	Max Martin; Rami Yacoub	Martin; Yacoub	3:49
6.	"Treat Her Like a Lady"	Diana King; Andy Marvel; Billy Mann; Celine Dion	Ric Wake	4:05
7.	"Misled"	Peter Zizzo; Jimmy Bralower	Wake	3:30
8.	"Love Can Move Mountains"	Warren	Wake	4:53
9.	"River Deep, Mountain High"	Ellie Greenwich; Jeff Barry; Phil Spector	Jim Steinman; Steven Rinkoff^{[c]}	4:10
10.	"My Heart Will Go On"	James Horner; Will Jennings	Walter Afanasieff; Horner^{[c]}	4:40
11.	"Encore un soir"	Goldman	Goldman; Yann Macé; Luc Leroy	4:23
12.	"Pour que tu m'aimes encore"	Goldman	Goldman; Benzi	4:15
Total length:				49:26

Disc three (karaoke)
No.	Title	Writer(s)	Producer(s)	Length
1.	"L'étoile"	Grand Corps Malade; Romiti; Lisbonne; Mothe	Lisbonne; Tiborg	3:14
2.	"Ordinaire"	Monfette; Charlebois; Nadeau	Price; Gatica	4:44
3.	"Je sais pas"	Goldman; Kapler	Goldman; Benzi	4:34
4.	"Immensité"	Bouraoui; Veneruso	Veneruso; Hampartzoumian	3:34
5.	"Et je t'aime encore"	Goldman; Kapler	Benzi	3:26
6.	"Si c'était à refaire"	Guiol; Veneruso	Veneruso; Blanchard	3:52
7.	"À vous"	Zaho; Carquet; Marie-Louise	Zaho; Carquet; Marie-Louise	3:46
8.	"S'il suffisait d'aimer"	Goldman	Goldman; Benzi	3:35
9.	"My Heart Will Go On"	Horner; Jennings	Afanasieff; Horner	4:40
10.	"Encore un soir"	Goldman	Goldman; Macé; Leroy	4:23
11.	"Pour que tu m'aimes encore"	Goldman	Goldman; Benzi	4:15
12.	"Parler à mon père"	Veneruso	Veneruso; Hampartzoumian	2:55
13.	"Les yeux au ciel"	Grand Corps Malade; Romiti; Lisbonne; Mothe	Lisbonne; Tiborg^{[a]}	2:57
14.	"J'irai où tu iras"	Goldman	Goldman; Benzi	3:27
15.	"Qui peut vivre sans amour?"	Élodie Hesme; David Gategno	Julien Schultheis; Gategno	3:29
Total length:				60:51

=== Notes ===
- ^{^a} signifies an additional producer
- ^{^b} signifies a vocal producer
- ^{^c} signifies a co-producer
- All tracks on disc three are instrumental versions.

== Charts ==
=== Weekly charts ===
Weekly chart performance
Chart (2017)	Peak position
Belgian Albums (Ultratop Wallonia)	6
French Albums (SNEP)	1

=== Year-end charts ===
Year-end chart performance
Chart (2017)	Position
Belgian Albums (Ultratop Wallonia)	162
French Albums (SNEP)	70

== Certifications and sales ==
Certifications
Region	Certification	Certified units/sales
France (SNEP)	Gold	80,082

== Release history ==
Release history
Region	Date	Label	Format	Catalog
France	21 July 2017	Columbia	CD	88985467592
Belgium (Wallonia)	28 July 2017	Columbia	CD	88985467592

== See also ==
- Celine Dion Live 2017
- List of number-one hits of 2017 (France)
