= Encore un soir (album) =

Studio album by Celine Dion
- Released: 26 August 2016
- Recorded: June 2015 – June 2016
- Studios: Angel, RAK (London); Hyperion (Marseilles); Addictive, Gum Prod, Miscendo (Paris); East West, Lion Share, United (Los Angeles); Piccolo, Plearmusic (Montreal); Piano Music, Power Sound (Amsterdam); At the Palms (Las Vegas)
- Genre: Pop
- Length: 45:12
- Language: French
- Label: Columbia
- Producers: Thierry Blanchard; Ludovic Carquet; Humberto Gatica; Jean-Jacques Goldman; Patrick Hampartzoumian; Luc Leroy; Silvio Lisbonne; Yann Macé; Therry Marie-Louise; Eddy Marnay; Rudi Pascal; Scott Price; Jacques Veneruso; Zaho

Celine Dion chronology
| Céline une seule fois / Live 2013 (2014) | Encore un soir (2016) | Un peu de nous (2017) |

Singles from Encore un soir
- 1. "Encore un soir" Released: 24 May 2016; 2. "L'étoile" Released: 11 October 2016; 3. "Si c'était à refaire" Released: 14 October 2016; 4. "Je nous veux" Released: 13 February 2017; 5. "Les yeux au ciel" Released: 14 April 2017

Encore un soir (lit. 'One more evening') is the twenty-sixth studio album, and the fifteenth French-language album, by Canadian singer Celine Dion. Released by Columbia Records on 26 August 2016, it includes songs produced by Jean-Jacques Goldman, Jacques Veneruso, Zaho, Silvio Lisbonne, Humberto Gatica, and Scott Price. The lead single, "Encore un soir", was issued on 24 May 2016 and reached number one in several Francophone countries.

The album received positive critical reviews and became a major commercial success. It topped the charts in France, Canada, Belgium, and Switzerland, earning diamond certification in France, double platinum in Canada, and platinum in Belgium and Switzerland. It finished 2016 as the best-selling album in Belgium, the second best-selling album in France (and the year's top-selling album by a female artist), the seventh best-selling album in Switzerland, and the eighth best-selling album in Canada, where it was the only Francophone release in the year-end top ten. Encore un soir also became Dion's first French-language album to appear on the US Billboard charts and has sold more than 1.5 million copies worldwide.

== Background ==
In August 2015, Dion's manager, Aldo Giampaolo, announced that the singer would release French- and English-language albums in 2016 and 2017, respectively. The French album would include mainly new material, as well as a cover of Robert Charlebois' song "Ordinaire", and a remastered version of "Trois heures vingt", which originally appeared on the singer's 1984 studio album Mélanie. On 19 May 2016, Dion's official website began revealing excerpts from the lyrics of the lead single, "Encore un soir", written by Jean-Jacques Goldman. The single was released on 24 May 2016. Its cover art, revealed on 17 May 2016, is identical to the album's cover.

During a series of interviews with various news outlets on 12 May 2016 at The Colosseum at Caesars Palace, Dion announced that the upcoming French album would be released in August 2016. On 1 July 2016, the track list was published by several news websites, noting a standard edition with 12 tracks, and a deluxe edition with 15. On 9 November 2015, celinedion.com launched a contest allowing fans to submit a song for possible inclusion on the album. On 2 December 2015, after more than 1,000 votes, Dion's website announced that the winning submission was Daniel Picard's track "À la plus haute branche", which would be included on the album.

== Content ==
Encore un soir was recorded between June 2015 and June 2016. In the middle of the recording process, in January 2016, Dion's husband and manager, René Angélil, died. The album was released over seven months later, in August 2016. Dion and Angélil's plan for a new collaboration with French artist Jean-Jacques Goldman materialised with "Encore un soir", marking their first reunion in more than 12 years. Released as the lead single, the title track became both a commercial and critical success. For the first time, the French artists Francis Cabrel and Serge Lama co-wrote a song for Dion ("Plus qu'ailleurs"). Jacques Veneruso, one of her most frequent collaborators in recent years, also wrote and composed a new song ("Si c'était à refaire"). Grand Corps Malade contributed two titles, "L'étoile" and "Les yeux au ciel", continuing his collaboration with Dion that began on Sans attendre. Dion also worked with new writers and producers, including Zaho and LNT Musik (Ludovic Carquet and Therry Marie-Louise), who wrote and produced "Ma faille", "Tu sauras", and "À vous" (on the deluxe edition). Other new collaborators include Florent Mothe and Mutine (Manon Romiti and Silvio Lisbonne), who wrote "L'étoile", "Les yeux au ciel", and "Le bonheur en face".

Dion sought to pay tribute to Quebec's musical heritage by reinterpreting the classic Robert Charlebois song "Ordinaire". Marc Dupré also worked with Dion on "Je nous veux" and "Toutes ces choses". Daniel Picard's song "À la plus haute branche" was selected from more than 4,000 submissions following a contest launched on Dion's website. These Quebec-origin songs were produced by Humberto Gatica and Scott Price. In addition to "À vous", the deluxe edition includes "Ma force", written by Vianney, and a remastered version of "Trois heures vingt", Dion's 1984 recording. "Trois heures vingt" was originally recorded for the Mélanie album. It appears on Encore un soir because Angélil was particularly fond of the song, which was played during his funeral service at exactly 3:20 pm, marking the start of the ceremony. It also opened Dion's Summer Tour 2016. Other songs from the album performed on the tour included "Encore un soir", "Ordinaire", and "À la plus haute branche" (in Canada).

== Singles ==
"Encore un soir" was released as the lead single from the album on 24 May 2016. It received positive reviews from music critics and topped the charts in France, Quebec, and the French-speaking part of Switzerland. It also reached the top 10 in Luxembourg and Belgium. On 12 August 2016, the audio of "Trois heures vingt" was uploaded on YouTube/Vevo. The following week, the song entered the chart in France at number 73. On 19 August 2016, the lyric video was also released. On 11 October 2016, "L'étoile" was announced as the second single in Canada. In 2017, "L'étoile" was released as the third single in France and Belgium. On 14 October 2016, "Si c'était à refaire" was sent to radio stations in France and Belgium as the second single there. On 13 February 2017, "Je nous veux" was announced as the third single in Canada. "Les yeux au ciel" was released as the fourth single in France on 14 April 2017, and in Canada in June 2017.

== Promotion ==
In November 2015, Dion's official website announced the first shows of her upcoming Summer Tour 2016. She toured Belgium, France, and Canada between 20 June 2016 and 31 August 2016, performing a total of 28 shows. The sold-out tour received positive reviews, with Dion performing several songs she had not performed live before, mainly from the 1 fille & 4 types album. The setlist included only a few songs from the upcoming Encore un soir album: "Trois heures vingt", "Encore un soir", "Ordinaire", and "À la plus haute branche" (added in Canada). On 7 September 2016, Dion performed "Encore un soir" and "Les yeux au ciel" for the first time on television on M6's Music Show – 100% tubes 2016 in France. On 1 October 2016, she also performed "Encore un soir" and "Les yeux au ciel" on Le Grand Show on France 2. Both shows were recorded in June 2016 while Dion was touring France. In the summer of 2017, she toured Europe with her Celine Dion Live 2017 concert tour.

== Critical reception ==
Professional ratings
Review scores
| Source | Rating |
|---|---|
| AllMusic | 4/5 stars |
| Entertainment Weekly | B |
| Le Figaro | positive |
| La Presse | 4/5 stars |
| RTL | positive |
| TF1 | positive |

Encore un soir received widespread critical acclaim. AllMusic awarded it four out of five stars, describing the album as "one of the subtlest and most moving collections in her catalog". Nicolas Houle of La Presse wrote that "Encore un soir", written by Jean-Jacques Goldman, demonstrates notable restraint and subtlety, calling it one of the album's strongest tracks. He also praised "Ordinaire", originally performed by Robert Charlebois, as well as the two songs written by Grand Corps Malade ("L'étoile" and "Les yeux au ciel"), and "À la plus haute branche" by Daniel Picard.

Alain de Repentigny of La Presse described the album as carefully arranged and highlighted "Plus qu'ailleurs" (written by Francis Cabrel and Serge Lama), "L'étoile" (with music by Florent Mothe and Mutine), "Encore un soir", "Je nous veux", "Toutes ces choses" (both written by Marc Dupré), "Si c'était à refaire" (by Jacques Veneruso), "Tu sauras" (by Zaho), and "À la plus haute branche". Benjamin Locoge of Paris Match also gave the album a positive review. He praised "Plus qu'ailleurs", "À la plus haute branche", and the new feminine adaptation of "Ordinaire".

== Accolades ==
On 26 September 2016, Dion was nominated for the NRJ Music Award in the category Francophone Female Artist of the Year. On 18 October 2016, Encore un soir was nominated for the RTL Album of the Year. The album was also nominated for the Swiss Music Award in the category Best International Album. It received two nominations at the Juno Awards of 2017: Album of the Year and Adult Contemporary Album of the Year. In September 2017, Dion was nominated for four Félix Awards: Female Vocalist of the Year, Adult Contemporary Album of the Year, Best Selling Album of the Year, and Most Popular Song of the Year ("Encore un soir"). The following month, Encore un soir won two Félix Awards for Adult Contemporary Album of the Year and Best Selling Album of the Year.

== Commercial performance ==
The album was a commercial success. Encore un soir debuted at number one in France with 218,684 units sold. It sold 216,555 copies (208,069 physical and 8,486 downloads), plus 2,129 units from streaming. Encore un soir had the second-largest opening week of 2016 and of the decade. In April 2016, Renaud entered the chart with 287,323 units sold. Before that, only Johnny Hallyday achieved higher first-week sales. In November 2002, his album À la vie, à la mort ! sold 305,634 copies in France. With Encore un soir, Dion also achieved the highest first-week sales for a female artist in France. In its second week, the album remained at number one with 90,408 units sold (86,141 sales and 4,267 streaming), bringing the total to 309,092 units. After two weeks, it was already the third best-selling album of the year in France. In its third week, it stayed at number one with 56,204 units sold (54,900 sales and 1,304 streaming), reaching 358,900 units in total. In the fourth week, it dropped to number two with 32,825 units sold (31,849 sales and 975 streaming), reaching 391,725 units. However, it remained at number one on the Physical Albums Chart in France. In the fifth week, Encore un soir returned to number one with 22,980 units sold (22,188 sales and 792 streaming). The following week, it stayed at number one with 22,921 units sold (21,509 sales and 1,412 streaming), reaching 437,626 units. In the seventh week, it remained at number one with 18,806 units sold (17,590 sales and 1,216 streaming).

The next week, Encore un soir fell to number three, selling 14,521 units (13,152 sales and 1,369 streaming), bringing the total to 470,953 units (463,884 pure sales and 7,069 streaming). In the ninth week, the album dropped to number eight with 11,155 copies sold. In the 10th week, it rose to number seven with 9,329 copies sold. The following week, Encore un soir fell to number eight with 9,408 copies sold. After 11 weeks, the album had sold 503,105 units in France (493,776 pure sales and 9,329 streaming). On 11 November 2016, it was certified diamond for sales exceeding 500,000 copies. In the 12th week, Encore un soir fell to number 10 with 8,588 copies sold, bringing pure sales to 502,364 units. In the 13th week, the album fell to number 12 with 8,078 copies sold, bringing pure sales to 510,442 units. The next week, it rose to number 11 with 10,700 units sold. In the 15th week, the album returned to the top 10 at number seven with 19,507 copies sold. The following week, Encore un soir rose to number five with 31,866 copies sold, bringing pure sales to 572,515 units. In the 17th week, the album climbed to number three with 48,398 copies sold, bringing pure sales to 620,913 units. In the final week of 2016, Encore un soir rose to number two with 27,493 copies sold. It became the second best-selling album of 2016 in France with 662,047 copies sold. In the first two weeks of 2017, the album sold 7,103 copies (number five) and 4,955 units (number seven). In the third week of 2017, Encore un soir fell to number 13.

In Canada, the album debuted at number one with 60,175 copies sold, including 57,085 in Quebec. It became Dion's 15th number-one album in Canada. It also topped the chart in Quebec. In its first week in Quebec, Encore un soir sold three times more copies than the remaining 99 albums in the Quebec Top 100 Albums Chart. The album stayed at number one in the second week in Canada and Quebec with 20,000 copies sold (18,797 in Quebec). In the third week in Canada, Encore un soir remained at number one with 11,000 copies sold (12,000 total consumption units). With Encore un soir, Dion achieved her longest run at number one in Canada since 2007's Taking Chances. In the fourth week, the album slipped to number three, although it remained the week's best-selling album with 5,400 copies purchased. The albums at number one and two generated more streams that week, as Billboard's Canadian Albums Chart became a consumption chart that also includes on-demand streaming.

In the fifth week, Encore un soir fell to number five on Billboard's Canadian Albums Chart and slipped from number one to number three on the Canadian Albums Sales Chart. The next week, the album fell to number six on the Canadian Albums Chart but rose to number two on the Sales Chart. In the seventh week, it fell to number 10 on the Canadian Albums Chart and number seven on the Sales Chart, selling 3,153 copies. After seven weeks, the album had sold 108,846 copies in Canada, including 102,858 in Quebec. In the eighth week, it fell to number 13 on the Canadian Albums Chart and rose to number six on the Sales Chart. The next week, Encore un soir fell to number 26 on the Canadian Albums Chart and number 16 on the Sales Chart. In the 10h week, it fell to number 32 on the Canadian Albums Chart and number 19 on the Sales Chart. In Quebec, after nine weeks at number one, Encore un soir fell to number four. As of 2 December 2016, the album had sold 127,700 pure sales in Canada. Encore un soir became the eighth best-selling album of 2016 in Canada with 140,000 units sold (134,000 pure sales).

Encore un soir also reached number one in both the Flanders and Wallonia regions of Belgium and in Switzerland, number three in Italy, number six in Poland, number seven in the Netherlands, number 13 in Portugal, number 15 in Austria, number 16 in Germany, number 18 in Spain, number 20 in Hungary, number 32 in Greece, and number 58 in South Korea. In the United Kingdom, it debuted at number 88 on the Official Albums Chart, which includes physical and digital sales and audio streaming, and at number 56 on the Official Albums Sales Chart, which includes physical and digital sales (also at number 60 on the Official Physical Albums Chart and number 65 on the Official Album Downloads Chart). It also debuted at number 70 in Scotland.

Encore un soir became Dion's first French-language album to enter the Billboard charts in the United States. It debuted at number 82 on the Top Current Albums, number 96 on the Top Album Sales, and number one on the World Albums chart. The album was certified diamond in France, double platinum in Canada, and platinum in Belgium and Switzerland. In 2016, Encore un soir sold 1.1 million copies worldwide. As of October 2017, the album has sold over 1.5 million copies globally.

== Track listing ==
Standard edition
| No. | Title | Writer(s) | Producer(s) | Length |
|---|---|---|---|---|
| 1. | "Plus qu'ailleurs" | Francis Cabrel; Serge Lama | Jacques Veneruso; Patrick Hampartzoumian | 3:38 |
| 2. | "L'étoile" | Grand Corps Malade; Manon Romiti; Silvio Lisbonne; Florent Mothe | Lisbonne; Tiborg^{[a]} | 3:14 |
| 3. | "Ma faille" | Zaho; Ludovic Carquet; Therry Marie-Louise; Flavien Compagnon; Giorgio Tuinfort | Zaho; Carquet; Marie-Louise | 3:51 |
| 4. | "Encore un soir" | Jean-Jacques Goldman | Goldman; Yann Macé; Luc Leroy | 4:23 |
| 5. | "Je nous veux" | Nelson Minville; Marc Dupré | Humberto Gatica; Scott Price | 3:58 |
| 6. | "Les yeux au ciel" | Grand Corps Malade; Romiti; Lisbonne; Mothe | Lisbonne; Tiborg^{[a]} | 2:57 |
| 7. | "Si c'était à refaire" | Alice Guiol; Veneruso | Veneruso; Thierry Blanchard | 3:52 |
| 8. | "Ordinaire" | Claudine Monfette; Robert Charlebois; Pierre Nadeau | Price; Gatica | 4:44 |
| 9. | "Tu sauras" | Zaho; Carquet; Marie-Louise; Tuinfort | Zaho; Carquet; Marie-Louise | 3:26 |
| 10. | "Toutes ces choses" | Minville; Dupré | Gatica; Price | 3:24 |
| 11. | "Le bonheur en face" | Romiti; Lisbonne; Mothe | Lisbonne | 2:55 |
| 12. | "À la plus haute branche" | Daniel Picard | Gatica; Price | 4:50 |
| Total length: | | | | 45:12 |

Deluxe edition
| No. | Title | Writer(s) | Producer(s) | Length |
|---|---|---|---|---|
| 13. | "À vous" | Zaho; Carquet; Marie-Louise | Zaho; Carquet; Marie-Louise | 3:46 |
| 14. | "Ma force" | Vianney Bureau | Price; Gatica | 4:14 |
| 15. | "Trois heures vingt" | Eddy Marnay; Patrick Lemaître | Marnay; Rudi Pascal | 3:37 |
| Total length: | | | | 56:49 |

=== Notes ===
- ^{^a} signifies an additional producer
- "Trois heures vingt" is a remastered version of the 1984 song taken from the Mélanie album.

== Personnel ==
Adapted from AllMusic.

- John Arnold – violin
- Guy Bélanger – harmonica
- Marc Bercovitz – direction
- Thierry Blanchard – instrumentation, piano, programming, production
- Jascha Bordon – cello
- Francis Cabrel – guitar
- Ludovic Carquet – bass, keyboards, programming, production
- Vinnie Colaiuta – drums
- Flavien Compagnon – piano
- Celine Dion – lead and background vocals
- Élisabeth Dubé – cello
- Philippe Dunnigan – violin
- Nathan East – bass
- Jennifer Eriksson – violin
- Bram Faber – viola
- Peppe "Squared" Folliero – mixing
- Humberto Gatica – choir and chorus, engineering, mixing, production, recording
- Eric Giausserand – trumpet
- Christine Giguère – cello
- Kaven Girouard – acoustic guitar
- Jean-Jacques Goldman – arrangement, production
- Mark Gray – assistant
- Simon Hale – Fender Rhodes, piano
- Patrick Hampartzoumian – drums, percussion, programming, production
- Earl Harvin – drums
- Annemarie Hensens – viola
- Marije De Jong – cello
- Michaël Joussein – trombone
- Rob Katz – assistant
- Yves Labonté – bass
- Luc Leroy – keyboards, piano, programming
- Silvio Lisbonne – bass, keyboards, drums, executive production, Fender Rhodes, acoustic guitar, electric guitar, keyboard programming, percussion, piano, production, programming
- Yann Macé – keyboards, drums, mixing, percussion
- Ars Magna – design
- Alix Malka – photography
- Therry Marie-Louise – bass, keyboards, programming, production
- Eddy Marnay – production
- Vincent Martínez – guitar
- Guy Matteoni – arrangement
- Vlado Meller – mastering
- Valérie Michelin – executive production
- Hinse Mutter – cello
- Everton Nelson – leader
- Martin Nessi – assistant, choir and chorus, engineering, mixing, percussion, recording
- Dean Parks – dobro, acoustic guitar
- Jason Patterson – assistant
- Yanna Pelser – viola
- Tim Pierce – acoustic guitar, electric guitar
- Eddy Pradelles – acoustic guitar
- Scott Price – arrangement, keyboards, piano, production
- Patrice Pruneau – assistant
- Rebecca Ramsey – violin
- Paul Richard – percussion
- Pierre-Luc Rioux – guitar, acoustic guitar, electric guitar
- Thérèse Ryan – cello
- Denis Savage – engineering, recording
- Yannick Soccal – tenor saxophone
- Michael Thompson – acoustic guitar, electric guitar
- Giorgio Tuinfort – piano
- Franck van der Heijden – arrangement, percussion, programming
- Jacques Veneruso – guitar, production
- Tiborg – electric guitar, drums, keyboards, programming, additional production, recording (guitar, bass, keyboards)

== Charts ==
=== Weekly charts ===
Weekly chart performance
| Chart (2016) | Peak position |
|---|---|
| Australian Albums (ARIA) | 132 |
| Austrian Albums (Ö3 Austria) | 15 |
| Belgian Albums (Ultratop Flanders) | 1 |
| Belgian Albums (Ultratop Wallonia) | 1 |
| Canadian Albums (Billboard) | 1 |
| Czech Albums (ČNS IFPI) | 2 |
| Dutch Albums (Album Top 100) | 7 |
| French Albums (SNEP) | 1 |
| German Albums (Offizielle Top 100) | 16 |
| Greek Albums (IFPI) | 32 |
| Hungarian Albums (MAHASZ) | 20 |
| Italian Albums (FIMI) | 3 |
| Polish Albums (ZPAV) | 6 |
| Portuguese Albums (AFP) | 13 |
| Quebec Albums (ADISQ) | 1 |
| Scottish Albums (Official Charts) | 70 |
| South Korean Albums (Circle) | 58 |
| South Korean International Albums (Circle) | 6 |
| Spanish Albums (Promusicae) | 18 |
| Swiss Albums (Schweizer Hitparade) | 1 |
| Swiss Albums (Schweizer Hitparade Romandy) | 1 |
| UK Albums (Official Charts) | 88 |
| US Top Album Sales (Billboard) | 96 |
| US World Albums (Billboard) | 1 |

=== Year-end charts ===
2016 year-end chart performance
| Chart (2016) | Position |
|---|---|
| Belgian Albums (Ultratop Flanders) | 43 |
| Belgian Albums (Ultratop Wallonia) | 1 |
| Canadian Albums (Billboard) | 11 |
| Canadian Overall Albums (SoundScan) | 8 |
| Canadian Sales Albums (SoundScan) | 3 |
| Canadian Physical Sales Albums (SoundScan) | 2 |
| French Albums (SNEP) | 2 |
| Hungarian Albums (MAHASZ) | 78 |
| Swiss Albums (Schweizer Hitparade) | 7 |
| Worldwide Albums (IFPI) | 19 |

2017 year-end chart performance
| Chart (2017) | Position |
|---|---|
| Belgian Albums (Ultratop Flanders) | 146 |
| Belgian Albums (Ultratop Wallonia) | 31 |
| French Albums (SNEP) | 66 |
| Swiss Albums (Schweizer Hitparade) | 35 |

== Certifications and sales ==
Certifications
| Region | Certification | Certified units/sales |
|---|---|---|
| Belgium (BRMA) | Platinum | 30,000^{*} |
| Canada (Music Canada) | 2× Platinum | 160,000^{^} |
| France (SNEP) | Diamond | 800,000 |
| Switzerland (IFPI Switzerland) | Platinum | 20,000^{^} |
Summaries
| Worldwide | — | 1,500,000 |
^{*} Sales figures based on certification alone.^{^} Shipments figures based on certification alone.

== Release history ==
Release history
| Region | Date | Label | Format | Catalog |
|---|---|---|---|---|
| Various | 26 August 2016 | Columbia | CD with 12 songs and 28-page booklet | 889853371723 (standard) |
| Various | 26 August 2016 | Columbia | CD with 15 songs, 28-page booklet, notebook and 6 fabric bracelets | 889853438129 (deluxe) |
| Various | 26 August 2016 | Columbia | 2LP with 15 songs + CD with 15 songs | 889853371716 (LP) |
| Various | 25 November 2016 | Columbia | CD with 15 songs, 28-page booklet and calendar | 889853865420 (calendar) |

== See also ==
- List of number-one albums of 2016 (Canada)
- List of number-one hits of 2016 (France)
- List of number-one hits of 2016 (Switzerland)
