= List of number-one hits of 2016 (France) =

This is a list of the French SNEP Top 200 Singles and Top 200 Albums number-ones of 2016.

== Number ones by week ==
=== Singles chart ===
Week	Issue date	Download			Streaming		
Week	Issue date	Artist(s)	Title	Ref.	Artist(s)	Title	Ref.
1	7 January	Adele	"Hello"		Jul	"Amnésia"	
2	14 January	David Bowie	"Space Oddity"		Jul	"Amnésia"	
3	21 January	Matt Simons	"Catch & Release" (Deepend Remix)		Jul	"Amnésia"	
4	28 January	Renaud	"Toujours debout"		Yall featuring Gabriela Richardson	"Hundred Miles"	
5	4 February	Rihanna featuring Drake	"Work"		Yall featuring Gabriela Richardson	"Hundred Miles"	
6	11 February	Matt Simons	"Catch & Release" (Deepend Remix)		Yall featuring Gabriela Richardson	"Hundred Miles"	
7	18 February	Jain	"Come"		Rihanna featuring Drake	"Work"	
8	25 February	Rihanna featuring Drake	"Work"		Rihanna featuring Drake	"Work"	
9	3 March	Alan Walker	"Faded"		Rihanna featuring Drake	"Work"	
10	10 March	Alan Walker	"Faded"		Rihanna featuring Drake	"Work"	
11	17 March	Alan Walker	"Faded"		Alan Walker	"Faded"	
12	24 March	Alan Walker	"Faded"		Alan Walker	"Faded"	
13	31 March	Mylène Farmer	"City of Love"		Alan Walker	"Faded"	
14	7 April	Kungs vs. Cookin' on 3 Burners	"This Girl"		Alan Walker	"Faded"	
15	14 April	Drake featuring Wizkid and Kyla	"One Dance"		Alan Walker	"Faded"	
16	21 April	Kungs vs. Cookin' on 3 Burners	"This Girl"		Sia featuring Sean Paul	"Cheap Thrills"	
17	28 April	Prince and The Revolution	"Purple Rain"		Drake featuring Wizkid and Kyla	"One Dance"	
18	5 May	Sia featuring Sean Paul	"Cheap Thrills"		Drake featuring Wizkid and Kyla	"One Dance"	
19	12 May	Sia featuring Sean Paul	"Cheap Thrills"		Drake featuring Wizkid and Kyla	"One Dance"	
20	19 May	Justin Timberlake	"Can't Stop the Feeling!"		Drake featuring Wizkid and Kyla	"One Dance"	
21	26 May	Celine Dion	"Encore un soir"		Drake featuring Wizkid and Kyla	"One Dance"	
22	2 June	Celine Dion	"Encore un soir"		Drake featuring Wizkid and Kyla	"One Dance"	
23	9 June	Justin Timberlake	"Can't Stop the Feeling!"		Drake featuring Wizkid and Kyla	"One Dance"	
24	16 June	David Guetta featuring Zara Larsson	"This One's for You"		Drake featuring Wizkid and Kyla	"One Dance"	
25	23 June	David Guetta featuring Zara Larsson	"This One's for You"		Drake featuring Wizkid and Kyla	"One Dance"	
26	30 June	Justin Timberlake	"Can't Stop the Feeling!"		Drake featuring Wizkid and Kyla	"One Dance"	
27	7 July	Justin Timberlake	"Can't Stop the Feeling!"		Drake featuring Wizkid and Kyla	"One Dance"	
28	14 July	David Guetta featuring Zara Larsson	"This One's for You"		Drake featuring Wizkid and Kyla	"One Dance"	
29	21 July	Justin Timberlake	"Can't Stop the Feeling!"		Drake featuring Wizkid and Kyla	"One Dance"	
30	28 July	Booba	"E.L.E.P.H.A.N.T."		Drake featuring Wizkid and Kyla	"One Dance"	
31	4 August	Justin Timberlake	"Can't Stop the Feeling!"		Drake featuring Wizkid and Kyla	"One Dance"	
32	11 August	DJ Snake featuring Justin Bieber	"Let Me Love You"		Drake featuring Wizkid and Kyla	"One Dance"	
33	18 August	Justin Timberlake	"Can't Stop the Feeling!"		Drake featuring Wizkid and Kyla	"One Dance"	
34	25 August	Imany	"Don't Be So Shy" (Filatov & Karas Remix)		Drake featuring Wizkid and Kyla	"One Dance"	
35	1 September	Celine Dion	"Encore un soir"		DJ Snake featuring Justin Bieber	"Let Me Love You"	
36	8 September	Celine Dion	"Encore un soir"		DJ Snake featuring Justin Bieber	"Let Me Love You"	
37	15 September	Lady Gaga	"Perfect Illusion"		DJ Snake featuring Justin Bieber	"Let Me Love You"	
38	22 September	LP	"Lost on You"		PNL	"Naha"	
39	29 September	The Weeknd featuring Daft Punk	"Starboy"		Jul	"Tchikita"	
40	6 October	Booba	"DKR"		Jul	"Tchikita"	
41	13 October	Bruno Mars	"24K Magic"		Jul	"Tchikita"	
42	20 October	Julien Doré	"Le lac"		Jul	"Tchikita"	
43	27 October	Richard Orlinski and Eva Simons	"Heartbeat"		Jul	"Tchikita"	
44	3 November	Richard Orlinski and Eva Simons	"Heartbeat"		Booba	"DKR"	
45	10 November	Richard Orlinski and Eva Simons	"Heartbeat"		Booba	"DKR"	
46	17 November	Leonard Cohen	"Hallelujah"		PNL	"Onizuka"	
47	24 November	Bruno Mars	"24K Magic"		PNL	"Onizuka"	
48	1 December	LP	"Lost on You"		The Weeknd featuring Daft Punk	"Starboy"	
49	8 December	LP	"Lost on You"		Nekfeu	"Squa"	
50	15 December	LP	"Lost on You"		Nekfeu	"Squa"	
51	22 December	LP	"Lost on You"		Nekfeu	"Mauvaise graine"	
52	29 December	LP	"Lost on You"		Nekfeu	"Mauvaise graine"	

=== Albums chart ===
Week	Issue date	Artist(s)	Album	Ref.
1	7 January	Adele	25	
2	14 January	David Bowie	Blackstar	
3	21 January	David Bowie	Blackstar	
4	28 January	David Bowie	Blackstar	
5	4 February	Kids United	Un monde meilleur	
6	11 February	Pascal Obispo	Billet de femme	
7	18 February	Kids United	Un monde meilleur	
8	25 February	Kids United	Un monde meilleur	
9	3 March	Kids United	Un monde meilleur	
10	10 March	Jul	My World	
11	17 March	Les Enfoirés	2016 : Au rendez-vous des Enfoirés	
12	24 March	Les Enfoirés	2016 : Au rendez-vous des Enfoirés	
13	31 March	Les Enfoirés	2016 : Au rendez-vous des Enfoirés	
14	7 April	Les Enfoirés	2016 : Au rendez-vous des Enfoirés	
15	14 April	Renaud	Renaud	
16	21 April	Renaud	Renaud	
17	28 April	Renaud	Renaud	
18	5 May	Renaud	Renaud	
19	12 May	Renaud	Renaud	
20	19 May	Christophe Maé	L'attrape-rêves	
21	26 May	Christophe Maé	L'attrape-rêves	
22	2 June	Christophe Maé	L'attrape-rêves	
23	9 June	Christophe Maé	L'attrape-rêves	
24	16 June	Christophe Maé	L'attrape-rêves	
25	23 June	$-Crew	Destins liés	
26	30 June	Jul	Émotions	
27	7 July	Jul	Émotions	
28	14 July	Slimane	À bout de rêves	
29	21 July	Jul	Emotions	
30	28 July	Jul	Emotions	
31	4 August	Jul	Emotions	
32	11 August	Jul	Emotions	
33	18 August	Jul	Emotions	
34	25 August	Kids United	Tout le bonheur du monde	
35	1 September	Celine Dion	Encore un soir	
36	8 September	Celine Dion	Encore un soir	
37	15 September	Celine Dion	Encore un soir	
38	22 September	PNL	Dans la légende	
39	29 September	PNL	Dans la légende	
40	6 October	PNL	Dans la légende	
41	13 October	PNL	Dans la légende	
42	20 October	Julien Doré	&	
43	27 October	M. Pokora	My Way	
44	3 November	M. Pokora	My Way	
45	10 November	M. Pokora	My Way	
46	17 November	M. Pokora	My Way	
47	24 November	Metallica	Hardwired... to Self-Destruct	
48	1 December	M. Pokora	My Way	
49	8 December	Jul	L'ovni	
50	15 December	Nekfeu	Cyborg	
51	22 December	M. Pokora	My Way	
52	29 December	M. Pokora	My Way	

== Top Ten best sales ==
These are the ten best-selling albums in 2016

=== Albums ===
Pos.	Artist	Title
1	Renaud	Renaud
2	Céline Dion	Encore un soir
3	Kids United	Un monde meilleur
4	Kids United	Tout le bonheur du monde
5	M.Pokora	My Way
6	Kendji Girac	Ensemble
7	Maître Gims	Mon coeur avait raison
8	PNL	Dans la légende
9	Christophe Maé	L'attrape-rêves
10	Jul	My World

== See also ==
- 2016 in music
- List of number-one singles in France
- List of top 10 singles in 2016 (France)
