= List of number-one hits of 2016 (Switzerland) =

This is a list of the Swiss Hitparade number ones of 2016.

== Swiss charts ==
Issue date	Song	Artist	Album	Artist
3 January	"Hello"	Adele	25	Adele
10 January	"Hello"	Adele	25	Adele
17 January	"Hello"	Adele	Blackstar	David Bowie
24 January	"Hello"	Adele	Blackstar	David Bowie
31 January	"Geiles Leben"	Glasperlenspiel	Heiterefahne	Trauffer
7 February	"Geiles Leben"	Glasperlenspiel	Heiterefahne	Trauffer
14 February	"Faded"	Alan Walker	Heiterefahne	Trauffer
21 February	"Faded"	Alan Walker	Heiterefahne	Trauffer
28 February	"Faded"	Alan Walker	Heiterefahne	Trauffer
6 March	"Faded"	Alan Walker	Heiterefahne	Trauffer
13 March	"Faded"	Alan Walker	Heiterefahne	Trauffer
20 March	"Faded"	Alan Walker	2016: Au rendez-vous des Enfoirés	Les Enfoirés
27 March	"Faded"	Alan Walker	Breitbild	Breitbild
3 April	"Faded"	Alan Walker	Blues of Desperation	Joe Bonamassa
10 April	"Faded"	Alan Walker	Nicht von dieser Welt 2	Xavier Naidoo
17 April	"Faded"	Alan Walker	Seelenbeben	Andrea Berg
24 April	"Faded"	Alan Walker	Kryptonit	Manillio
1 May	"Faded"	Alan Walker	The Very Best of Prince	Prince
8 May	"One Dance"	Drake featuring Wizkid and Kyla	Black Cat	Zucchero Fornaciari
15 May	"One Dance"	Drake featuring Wizkid and Kyla	A Moon Shaped Pool	Radiohead
22 May	"Can't Stop the Feeling!"	Justin Timberlake	Cloud Nine	Kygo
29 May	"One Dance"	Drake featuring Wizkid and Kyla	I Still Do	Eric Clapton
5 June	"One Dance"	Drake featuring Wizkid and Kyla	Blut	Farid Bang
12 June	"One Dance"	Drake featuring Wizkid and Kyla	Seal the Deal & Let's Boogie	Volbeat
19 June	"This One's for You"	David Guetta featuring Zara Larsson	A Head Full of Dreams	Coldplay
26 June	"This One's for You"	David Guetta featuring Zara Larsson	The Getaway	Red Hot Chili Peppers
3 July	"This One's for You"	David Guetta featuring Zara Larsson	The Getaway	Red Hot Chili Peppers
10 July	"Duele el Corazón"	Enrique Iglesias featuring Wisin	Schiff ahoi	Calimeros
17 July	"Sofia"	Álvaro Soler	Ellipsis	Biffy Clyro
24 July	"Duele el Corazón"	Enrique Iglesias featuring Wisin	Eterno Agosto	Álvaro Soler
31 July	"Sofia"	Álvaro Soler	Wie ein Feuerwerk	Die Amigos
7 August	"Cold Water"	Major Lazer featuring Justin Bieber and MØ	Afraid of Heights	Billy Talent
14 August	"Cold Water"	Major Lazer featuring Justin Bieber and MØ	Eterno Agosto	Álvaro Soler
21 August	"Cold Water"	Major Lazer featuring Justin Bieber and MØ	Der Holland Job	Coup
28 August	"Cold Water"	Major Lazer featuring Justin Bieber and MØ	The Last Stand	Sabaton
4 September	"Sofia"	Álvaro Soler	Encore un soir	Celine Dion
11 September	"Let Me Love You"	DJ Snake featuring Justin Bieber	Vibe	Fler
18 September	"The Greatest"	Sia featuring Kendrick Lamar	Palmen aus Plastik	Bonez MC and RAF Camora
25 September	"Let Me Love You"	DJ Snake featuring Justin Bieber	Dans la légende	PNL
2 October	"Let Me Love You"	DJ Snake featuring Justin Bieber	Young as the Morning, Old as the Sea	Passenger
9 October	"Let Me Love You"	DJ Snake featuring Justin Bieber	Toy	Yello
16 October	"Human"	Rag'n'Bone Man	Day Breaks	Norah Jones
23 October	"Human"	Rag'n'Bone Man	Stärne	Gölä
30 October	"Human"	Rag'n'Bone Man	Stärne	Gölä
6 November	"Human"	Rag'n'Bone Man	Memento	Böhse Onkelz
13 November	"Human"	Rag'n'Bone Man	The Heavy Entertainment Show	Robbie Williams
20 November	"Human"	Rag'n'Bone Man	Dreams	Shindy
27 November	"Human"	Rag'n'Bone Man	Hardwired... to Self-Destruct	Metallica
4 December	"Rockabye"	Clean Bandit featuring Sean Paul and Anne-Marie	Abstand	KC Rebell
11 December	"Rockabye"	Clean Bandit featuring Sean Paul and Anne-Marie	Blue & Lonesome	The Rolling Stones
18 December	"Rockabye"	Clean Bandit featuring Sean Paul and Anne-Marie	Imperator	Kollegah
25 December	"Rockabye"	Clean Bandit featuring Sean Paul and Anne-Marie	Blue & Lonesome	The Rolling Stones

== Romandie charts ==
Issue date	Song	Artist	Album	Artist
3 January	"Hello"	Adele	25	Adele
10 January	"Hello"	Adele	25	Adele
17 January	"Hello"	Adele	Blackstar	David Bowie
24 January	"Hello"	Adele	Blackstar	David Bowie
31 January	"Catch & Release" (Deepend Remix)	Matt Simons	Blackstar	David Bowie
7 February	"Hundred Miles"	Yall featuring Gabriela Richardson	This Is Acting	Sia
14 February	"Catch & Release" (Deepend Remix)	Matt Simons	25	Adele
21 February	"Faded"	Alan Walker	Anomalie	Louise Attaque
28 February	"Faded"	Alan Walker	25	Adele
6 March	"Faded"	Alan Walker	Un monde meilleur	Kids United
13 March	"Faded"	Alan Walker	Un monde meilleur	Kids United
20 March	"Faded"	Alan Walker	2016: Au rendez-vous des Enfoirés	Les Enfoirés
27 March	"Faded"	Alan Walker	2016: Au rendez-vous des Enfoirés	Les Enfoirés
3 April	"Faded"	Alan Walker	2016: Au rendez-vous des Enfoirés	Les Enfoirés
10 April	"Faded"	Alan Walker	2016: Au rendez-vous des Enfoirés	Les Enfoirés
17 April	"Faded"	Alan Walker	Renaud	Renaud
24 April	"Faded"	Alan Walker	Renaud	Renaud
1 May	"Purple Rain"	Prince and The Revolution	Renaud	Renaud
8 May	"Cheap Thrills"	Sia	Habana	Florent Pagny
15 May	"Cheap Thrills"	Sia	Renaud	Renaud
22 May	"Cheap Thrills"	Sia	L'attrape-rêves	Christophe Maé
29 May	"Encore un soir"	Celine Dion	L'attrape-rêves	Christophe Maé
5 June	"Don't Be So Shy" (Filatov & Karas Remix)	Imany	L'attrape-rêves	Christophe Maé
12 June	"Duele el Corazón"	Enrique Iglesias featuring Wisin	L'attrape-rêves	Christophe Maé
19 June	"This One's for You"	David Guetta featuring Zara Larsson	L'attrape-rêves	Christophe Maé
26 June	"This One's for You"	David Guetta featuring Zara Larsson	The Getaway	Red Hot Chili Peppers
3 July	"Duele el Corazón"	Enrique Iglesias featuring Wisin	The Getaway	Red Hot Chili Peppers
10 July	"Duele el Corazón"	Enrique Iglesias featuring Wisin	The Getaway	Red Hot Chili Peppers
17 July	"Duele el Corazón"	Enrique Iglesias featuring Wisin	À bout de rêves	Slimane
24 July	"Duele el Corazón"	Enrique Iglesias featuring Wisin	À bout de rêves	Slimane
31 July	"Sofia"	Álvaro Soler	À bout de rêves	Slimane
7 August	"Sofia"	Álvaro Soler	À bout de rêves	Slimane
14 August	"Duele el Corazón"	Enrique Iglesias featuring Wisin	À bout de rêves	Slimane
21 August	"Sofia"	Álvaro Soler	Un monde meilleur	Kids United
28 August	"Sofia"	Álvaro Soler	Tout le bonheur du monde	Kids United
4 September	"Sofia"	Álvaro Soler	Encore un soir	Celine Dion
11 September	"Encore un soir"	Celine Dion	Encore un soir	Celine Dion
18 September	"Lost on You"	LP	Encore un soir	Celine Dion
25 September	"Lost on You"	LP	Dans la légende	PNL
2 October	"Lost on You"	LP	Encore un soir	Celine Dion
9 October	"Human"	Rag'n'Bone Man	Encore un soir	Celine Dion
16 October	"Human"	Rag'n'Bone Man	Encore un soir	Celine Dion
23 October	"Human"	Rag'n'Bone Man	&	Julien Doré
30 October	"Human"	Rag'n'Bone Man	You Want It Darker	Leonard Cohen
6 November	"Human"	Rag'n'Bone Man	You Want It Darker	Leonard Cohen
13 November	"Human"	Rag'n'Bone Man	Dignes, dingues, donc...	Véronique Sanson
20 November	"Hallelujah"	Leonard Cohen	You Want It Darker	Leonard Cohen
27 November	"Human"	Rag'n'Bone Man	Hardwired... to Self-Destruct	Metallica
4 December	"Human"	Rag'n'Bone Man	You Want It Darker	Leonard Cohen
11 December	"Human"	Rag'n'Bone Man	Blue & Lonesome	The Rolling Stones
18 December	"Lost on You"	LP	Blue & Lonesome	The Rolling Stones
25 December	"Human"	Rag'n'Bone Man	Blue & Lonesome	The Rolling Stones
