= Si c'était à refaire =

Si c'était à refaire (French for If I Had to Do It All Over Again) may refer to:

- "Si c'était à refaire" (song), a song by Celine Dion
- Second Chance (1976 film), English title of the French film Si c'était à refaire directed by Claude Lelouch
