= Recovering =

Single by Celine Dion
- Released: 9 September 2016
- Recorded: 15 August 2016
- Genre: Pop
- Length: 3:24
- Label: Columbia
- Songwriters: Alecia Moore; Allen Shamblin; Tom Douglas
- Producers: Humberto Gatica; Scott Price

Celine Dion singles chronology
| "Encore un soir" (2016) | "Recovering" (2016) | "L'étoile" (2016) |

Audio
- "Recovering" on YouTube

"Recovering" is a song recorded by Canadian singer Celine Dion and released as a single on 9 September 2016. Written by Pink after the death of Dion's husband, René Angélil, in January 2016, the track was presented as a message of support and resilience. Entertainment Tonight Canada named it one of the best songs of 2016.

== Background and release ==
On 6 July 2016, Dion revealed that Pink had written a song for her in honour of René Angélil, who died of cancer in January 2016. She also confirmed the song's title, "Recovering". Dion added that she had begun working on a new English‑language album. The song was released as a single on 9 September 2016.

== Commercial performance ==
In Canada, "Recovering" entered the Hot Digital Songs chart at number 16. It also topped the Quebec Digital Singles Chart for three non‑consecutive weeks. In the United States, it debuted on the Pop Digital Songs chart at number 28. In France, "Recovering" entered the Digital Singles Chart at number 49 and the Overall Singles Chart at number 50.

== Live performances ==
Dion performed "Recovering" during the Stand Up to Cancer Live Event on 9 September 2016. The telecast aired on more than forty television networks and selected online outlets. It was broadcast live from the Music Center's Walt Disney Concert Hall in Los Angeles. She also performed the song on The Ellen DeGeneres Show on 8 September 2016, with the episode airing on 12 September 2016. In September 2016, Dion added "Recovering" to the set list of her Las Vegas residency show, Celine. The song was also performed during Dion's 2017 and 2018 tours.

== Credits and personnel ==
Credits adapted from Tidal.

- Celine Dion – lead vocals
- Alecia Moore – songwriter
- Allen Shamblin – songwriter
- Tom Douglas – songwriter
- Humberto Gatica – producer, engineer, mix
- Scott Price – co-producer, programming, piano
- John Doelp – executive producer
- Vlado Meller – mastering
- Martin Nessi – engineer, mix
- Charlie Bisharat – concertmaster
- Timothy Loo – cello

== Charts ==
Chart performance
| Chart (2016) | Peak position |
|---|---|
| Canada Digital Song Sales (Billboard) | 16 |
| France (SNEP) | 50 |
| Quebec Digital Song Sales (ADISQ) | 1 |
| US Pop Digital Songs (Billboard) | 28 |

== Release history ==
Release history
| Region | Date | Format | Label | Ref. |
|---|---|---|---|---|
| Various | 9 September 2016 | Digital download; streaming | Columbia | |
