= Je nous veux =

Single by Celine Dion

from the album Encore un soir
- Language: French
- Released: 13 February 2017
- Recorded: 2016
- Studio: At the Palms (Las Vegas); Lion Share (Hollywood); Piccolo (Montreal); United (Los Angeles)
- Genre: Pop
- Length: 3:58
- Label: Columbia
- Songwriters: Nelson Minville; Marc Dupré
- Producers: Humberto Gatica; Scott Price

Celine Dion singles chronology
"Si c'était à refaire" (2016)	"Je nous veux" (2017)	"Les yeux au ciel" (2017)

Audio
- "Je nous veux" on YouTube

"Je nous veux" (lit. 'I want us') is a song by Canadian singer Celine Dion from her album Encore un soir (2016). It was released on 13 February 2017 as the album's third single in Canada. The track was written by Nelson Minville and Marc Dupré, and produced by Humberto Gatica and Scott Price.

== Commercial performance ==
In early September 2016, following the release of Encore un soir, "Je nous veux" entered the French Digital Singles Chart at number 142 and the French Overall Singles Chart at number 143. At the same time, it debuted at number 10 on the Quebec Digital Singles Chart. In March 2017, the song entered the Canadian Adult Contemporary chart, where it peaked at number 38. It became the album's third top‑40 entry on the Canadian AC chart. In mid‑April 2017, "Je nous veux" reached number 10 on the Quebec Radio Chart.

== Charts ==
Chart performance
Chart (2016–2017)	Peak position
Canada AC (Billboard)	38
France (SNEP)	143
Quebec Digital Song Sales (ADISQ)	10

== Release history ==
Release history
Region	Date	Format	Label	Ref.
Canada	13 February 2017	Contemporary hit radio	Columbia	
