= Les yeux au ciel =

Single by Celine Dion

from the album Encore un soir
- Language: French
- Released: 14 April 2017
- Recorded: 2016
- Studio: At the Palms (Las Vegas); Charmettes; Tick Tone Music; Plearmusic; TMP; Angel (London); RAK (London); Oldbnb; Lion Share (Hollywood)
- Genre: Pop
- Length: 2:57
- Label: Columbia
- Songwriters: Grand Corps Malade; Manon Romiti; Silvio Lisbonne; Florent Mothe
- Producers: Silvio Lisbonne; Tiborg

Celine Dion singles chronology
"Je nous veux" (2017)	"Les yeux au ciel" (2017)	"Ashes" (2018)

Audio
- "Les yeux au ciel" on YouTube

"Les yeux au ciel" (lit. 'Eyes to the sky') is a song by Canadian singer Celine Dion from her album Encore un soir (2016). It was released on 14 April 2017 in France as the album's fourth single. Written by Grand Corps Malade, the song includes music composed by Mutine (Manon Romiti and Silvio Lisbonne) and Florent Mothe. Lisbonne produced the track, with Tiborg credited as an additional producer.

== Commercial performance ==
Following the release of Encore un soir, "Les yeux au ciel" entered the French Digital Singles Chart at number 168 and the French Overall Singles Chart at number 169 in early September 2016. The song remained on both charts for three consecutive weeks. On 20 June 2017, it debuted at number 50 on the Canadian Adult Contemporary chart, later peaking at number 43 on 4 July 2017.

== Live performances ==
Dion first performed "Les yeux au ciel" on television on 7 September 2016 during M6's Music Show – 100% tubes 2016 in France. She also performed the song on Le Grand Show on France 2 on 1 October 2016. Both performances were recorded in June 2016 while Dion was touring France as part of her Summer Tour 2016.

== Credits and personnel ==
Recording

- Recorded at Studio at the Palms (Las Vegas), Angel Studio (London), RAK Studios (London), Studio des Charmettes, Studio Tick Tone Music, Studio Plearmusic, Studio TMP Recordings, Oldbnb Studio
- Mixed at Lionshare Studios (Los Angeles)

Personnel

- Celine Dion – lead and backing vocals
- Grand Corps Malade – songwriting (lyrics)
- Manon Romiti – songwriting (music)
- Silvio Lisbonne – songwriting (music), production, executive producer, recording, programming, keyboards, piano, acoustic guitar, electric guitar, bass, drums
- Florent Mothe – songwriting (music)
- Tiborg – additional production, recording, programming, keyboards, electric guitar, drums
- Simon Hale – conductor, strings arrangement, piano
- Isobel Griffiths – contractor
- Everton Nelson – strings leader
- Eddy Pradelles – acoustic guitar, recording
- Pierre-Luc Rioux – acoustic guitar, electric guitar, recording
- Earl Harvin – drums
- Rob Brinkmann – recording
- Wes "Wesonator" Maebe – recording
- Chris Parker – recording
- Mat Bartram – recording
- Humberto Gatica – vocal recording, mix

== Charts ==
Chart performance
Chart (2016–2017)	Peak position
Canada AC (Billboard)	43
France (SNEP)	169

== Release history ==
Release history
Region	Date	Format	Label	Ref.
France	14 April 2017	Contemporary hit radio	Columbia	
Canada	June 2017	Contemporary hit radio	Columbia	
