= Tiborg =

French singer-songwriter and musician

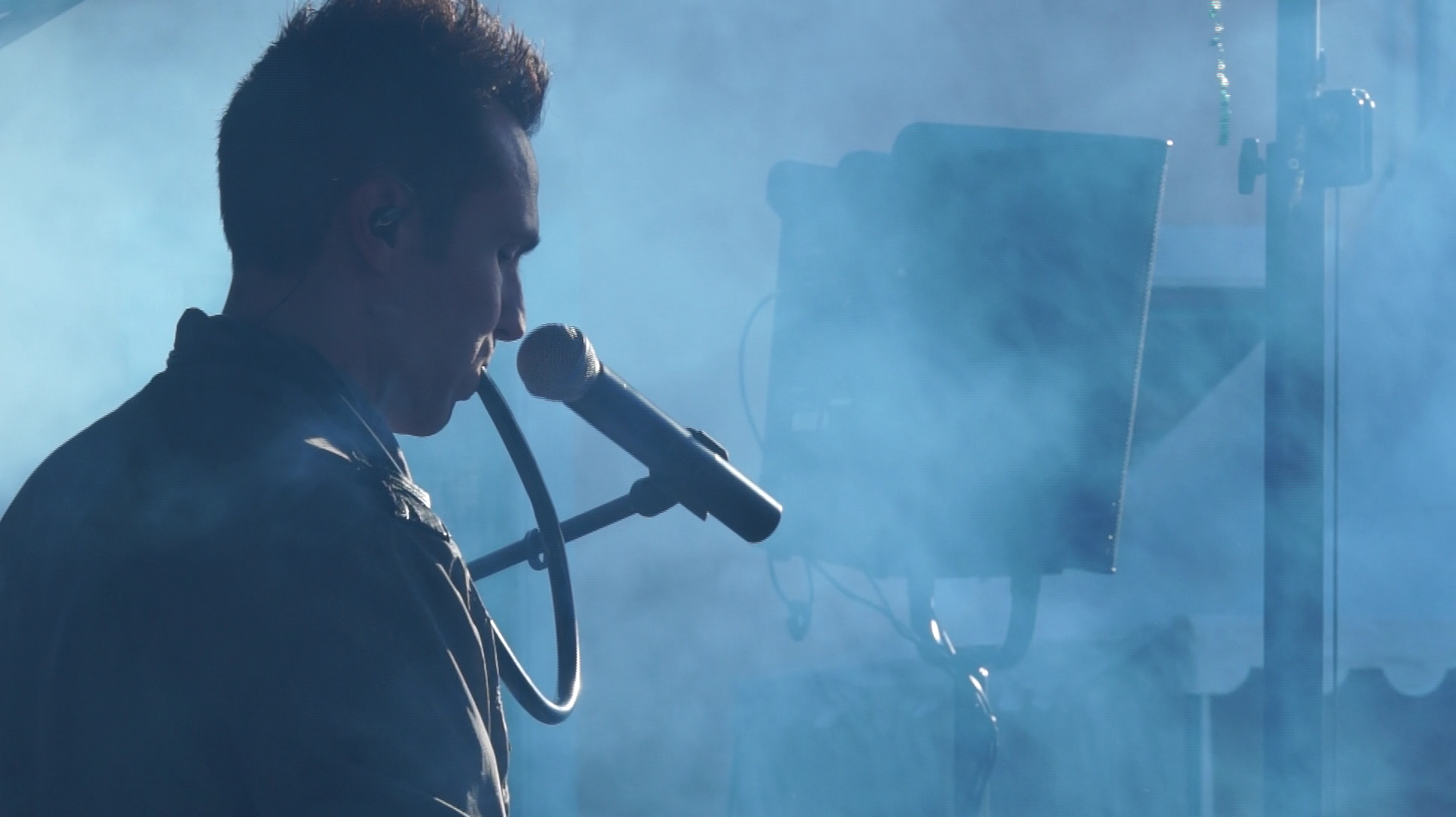

Background information
- Born: Julien Thomas; July 27, 1980 (age 46)
- Origin: France
- Genres: Electronic; dance-pop; house
- Occupations: Singer-songwriter; musician; record producer; DJ
- Years active: 2000–present
- Labels: Recall Publishing; East:West/Warner Music Group
- Website: www.tiborg.com

Julien Thomas (born 27 July 1980), known professionally as Tiborg, is a French singer-songwriter, musician, record producer and DJ.

== Biography ==
Julien Thomas learned early-on how to play instruments like the piano, the drums and the saxophone. Tiborg also took a particular interest in singing and at age 15 took classes in both jazz and operatic vocal techniques, earning a diploma at 19 from the Conservatoire of Music.

== Career ==
In 2000, at the age of 20, Tiborg founded his own recording studio and label company. This venture brought about opportunities, and in 2003, Tiborg signed his first contract with Recall Publishing, distributed by East :West/Warner Music under the pseudo of Astro. The song, a cover of Queen's hit "The Show Must Go On", attracted significant attention from French radio and DJs internationally, and Tiborg was invited to perform in clubs and at private events all over Europe and Russia. The song aired on the Europe 2 broadcast Club 40.

In 2008, he composed the soundtrack of the dancing show No(s) Limit(es), created by Alexandra N'Possee's company.

For 2009's New Year's Eve, he played live at La Nuit du Pompon Rouge, a famous party in La Plagne.

In 2013 and 2014, Tiborg composed and released two songs: "If U Wanna Be loved" and "Ukamane", both accompanied by a video clip.

Under various pseudonyms (Spreader, K.Melleon, among others), Tiborg composed music for brands such as BMW, Ferrari, Toyota, Rolex, and Tex.

At the same time, Tiborg developed a DJ/performer live concept, which brought him to play on national and international stages, such as the Pharaonic Festival, where he played beside Showtek, Tony Junior, and Blinders.

In September 2015, one of his tracks, "Club Believer", was used the season 4 episode 1 of the ABC Show Nashville, broadcast in front of 4.91 million viewers on ABC 10.

He composed and produced the title "Rise Again", from Gabriel Tumbak featuring the Israeli singer Gad Elbaz.

He mastered the titles "Dis-le moi" and "Ca va, ca va" of the French artist Claudio Capéo, extracted from the self-titled album, certified Platinum disc in France.

In 2016, Tiborg released his third single, "Miracle". The jacket's artwork was designed by Ruud Van Eijk (who also worked on the jackets of Zedd, Tiësto, Martin Garrix, and David Guetta). "Miracle" was played on the national French radio NRJ, in its broadcast Hit des Clubs DJ Buzz on Friday nights.

He mastered the album Au cœur de moi, by the French artist Amir, the French candidate of the Eurovision song contest in 2016.
More recently, Tiborg worked on three tracks "Les Yeux au Ciel", "L'Étoile" and "Le Bonheur en Face" of Celine Dion's album Encore Un Soir, as a musician (drums, additional programming and keyboards) and additional producer. The album was certified Diamant disc in France and has so far reached 1.5 million sales.

Late 2017, Tiborg co-realized 4 tracks of Anggun's latest international album which first single "What We Remember" has reached the Top 10 on U.S. Billboard Dance chart.

== Remixes ==
Tiborg's skill was highlighted on the international scene mostly with his remixes of La Roux, Will I Am, 30 Seconds to Mars, Alizée, Milk Inc, David Hallyday or Junior Caldera, for Polydor and Interscope, New York.

La Roux's remix of "Bulletproof", released in 2009, has been aired on Radio FG ever since. In 2010, the remix was used in the "Back To School" Abercrombie ad.

In 2009, he remixed Christophe Willem's song "Heartbox" for the NRJ Music Awards.

Tiborg's remix of "Forever", by Milk Inc, was, once again, used by Abercrombie & Fitch in their store playlist in May 2010.

He also remixed 30 Seconds To Mars' "Kings and Queens", for the Japan edit of their album This Is War. The same year, he also composed the song "Be a Star", for the Chinese artist Sony Chan.

In parallel of his solo career, Tiborg remixed Simon & Garfunkel's hit "Mrs Robinson" within his side project SpeekAir, an Electronic Deep Chill duet.

== Discography ==
=== Singles ===
- 2013 "If U Wanna Be Loved"
- 2014 "Ukamane"
- 2015 "Club Believer"
- 2016 "Miracle"

=== Remixes ===
- 2008 "Get Your Money" Will I Am
- 2008 "Fifty Sixty" Alizée
- 2008 "Forever" Milk Inc
- 2009 "Bulletproof" La Roux
- 2009 "Sleeping Satellite" Junior Caldera
- 2009 "Heartbox" Christophe Willem
- 2009 "Be A Star" Sony Chan
- 2010 "Welcome to Nowhere" David Hallyday
- 2011 "Kings and Queens" 30 Seconds To Mars
