= Trolls (soundtrack) =

2016 soundtrack album

Trolls: Original Motion Picture Soundtrack

Soundtrack album by Various artists
- Released: September 23, 2016
- Recorded: 2015–2016
- Studio: RCA
- Genre: Children's music
- Length: 37:12
- Label: RCA
- Producers: Justin Timberlake; Earth, Wind & Fire; Oscar Holter; Max Martin; Ilya; The Outfit; Nile Rodgers; Shellback; Timbaland

Singles from Trolls: Original Motion Picture Soundtrack
- 1. "Can't Stop the Feeling!" Released: May 6, 2016

Trolls: Original Motion Picture Soundtrack is the soundtrack album to the 2016 DreamWorks Animation film Trolls, released on September 23, 2016, by RCA Records. The soundtrack is produced primarily by singer Justin Timberlake, Max Martin, and Shellback. It features work from Timberlake himself, along with Anna Kendrick, Ron Funches, Zooey Deschanel and Gwen Stefani, who all voice characters in the film, as well as Earth, Wind & Fire and Ariana Grande. The album was certified Platinum in Australia and Double Platinum in the United States. The song "Can't Stop the Feeling!" was nominated for a Golden Globe and an Academy Award. The song won a Grammy Award. The soundtrack itself was nominated for both a Billboard and American Music Award.

== Background ==
After being announced as the voice to the lead character in the musical comedy Trolls opposite Anna Kendrick, Billboard reported that Justin Timberlake also signed on to write and perform original music for the film. Timberlake said in an interview:

It kind of all happened at the same time. I've been friends with the Katzenbergs for years, and Jeffrey had always spoken to me about doing a DreamWorks Animation film. I believe his line was, "We can't let Elton have all the fun," and I've always said, "If the right thing comes up, let's do it." ... The directors brought me to the DreamWorks campus and pitched me the movie and the character. And when I came out of the room Jeffrey was there, and he said, "And there's this other thing you could do..."

By the time Timberlake joined the project, there was still some original music that needed to be written for the film. Timberlake planned to cover the disco genre among the variety of pop songs present in the film. For the soundtrack album, Earth, Wind & Fire re-recorded "September" with Timberlake and Kendrick.

== Commercial performance ==
The soundtrack peaked at number one on the ARIA Charts, three on the US Billboard 200 album chart, four on the New Zealand Albums Chart, and four on the UK Albums Chart. It received Platinum certifications by the Recording Industry Association of America and the Australian Recording Industry Association, and a Gold certification by the British Phonographic Industry. In the United States, it has sold 573,000 copies by April 2017, and was the year's tenth highest selling album in the country with 522,000 sold throughout 2017.

The lead single, "Can't Stop the Feeling!" performed by Justin Timberlake, was released on May 6, 2016, and reached number one on the official charts of 17 countries, including the US Billboard Hot 100.

In 2017, Trolls was ranked as the 11th most popular album of the year on the Billboard 200.

Two years after the soundtrack was released, it was ranked as the 80th most popular album of 2018 on the Billboard 200.

== Accolades ==
Trolls was nominated for Best Soundtrack at the 2016 St. Louis Gateway Film Critics Association. For his work on the soundtrack, Justin Timberlake was nominated for Outstanding Music Supervision – Film, along with Best Soundtrack From a Movie, at the 2016 Hollywood Music in Media Awards. At the ceremony, "Can't Stop the Feeling!" won Best Song Written for an Animated Film. The album was nominated at the 2017 Billboard Music Awards for Top Soundtrack/Cast Album and at the American Music Awards for Top Soundtrack.

"Can't Stop the Feeling!" won the Grammy Award for Best Song Written for Visual Media, and was nominated for the Academy Award for Best Original Song. Timberlake received the Hollywood Song Award for "Can't Stop the Feeling!" at the 2016 Hollywood Film Awards. It was also nominated for the Golden Globe Award for Best Original Song, Critics' Choice Award for Best Song, and Satellite Award for Best Original Song.

== Track listing ==
No.	Title	Writer(s)	Producer(s)	Length
1.	"Hair Up" (Justin Timberlake, Gwen Stefani and Ron Funches)	Timberlake; Max Martin; Shellback; Savan Kotecha; Oscar Holter	Timberlake; Martin; Shellback; Holter	2:58
2.	"Can't Stop the Feeling!" (Timberlake)	Timberlake; Martin; Shellback	Timberlake; Martin; Shellback	3:58
3.	"Move Your Feet" / "D.A.N.C.E." / "It's a Sunshine Day" (Anna Kendrick, Stefani, James Corden, Funches, Walt Dohrn, Icona Pop, and Kunal Nayyar)	Jesper Mortensen; Justice; Jessie Chaton; Stephen McCarthy	Timberlake; The Outfit	2:36
4.	"Get Back Up Again" (Kendrick)	Benj Pasek & Justin Paul	Timberlake; The Outfit	2:45
5.	"The Sound of Silence" (Kendrick)	Paul Simon	Timberlake; The Outfit	0:48
6.	"Hello" (Zooey Deschanel)	Lionel Richie	Timberlake; The Outfit	1:37
7.	"I'm Coming Out" / "Mo' Money Mo' Problems" (Deschanel, Kendrick, Stefani, Corden, Dohrn, Funches, Icona Pop, and Nayyar)	Nile Rodgers; Bernard Edwards; Sean Combs; The Notorious B.I.G.; Stevie J; Mase	Timberlake; Rodgers	1:01
8.	"They Don't Know" (Ariana Grande)	Timberlake; Kotecha; Ilya	Ilya; Timberlake	3:17
9.	"True Colors" (Kendrick and Timberlake - film version)	Tom Kelly; Billy Steinberg	Timberlake; The Outfit	3:00
10.	"Can't Stop the Feeling!" (Timberlake, Kendrick, Stefani, Corden, Deschanel, Dohrn, Funches, Icona Pop, Christopher Mintz-Plasse and Nayyar – film version)	Timberlake; Martin; Shellback	Timberlake; Martin; Shellback	3:57
11.	"September" (Timberlake, Kendrick and Earth, Wind & Fire)	Al McKay; Allee Willis; Maurice White	Timberlake; Timbaland; Earth, Wind & Fire	3:54
12.	"What U Workin' With?" (Stefani and Timberlake)	Timberlake; Martin; Kotecha; Peter Svensson; Ilya	Timberlake; Martin; Ilya	3:15
13.	"True Colors" (Kendrick and Timberlake)	Kelly; Steinberg	Timberlake	4:03

== Score ==
All music is composed by Christophe Beck.

No.	Title	Length
1.	"No Troll Left Behind"	1:57
2.	"Trollstice"	2:02
3.	"Exile"	1:15
4.	"Collect 'em All"	2:47
5.	"Bunker"	0:43
6.	"Spiders!"	0:54
7.	"Campfire"	1:42
8.	"Chef Returns"	2:01
9.	"Run Cloud Run!"	0:24
10.	"Your Eyes"	1:04
11.	"Trolls Al Pastor"	1:56
12.	"Rescue"	1:57
13.	"Sellout"	1:59
14.	"Knocked Down"	2:47
15.	"Waiting for Glittersparkles"	2:54
16.	"Skate Save"	0:46
17.	"Empty Belly, Full Heart"	1:40
Total length:		28:01

== Charts ==
=== Weekly charts ===
Chart (2016–2017)	Peak position
Australian Albums (ARIA)	1
Austrian Albums (Ö3 Austria)	26
Belgian Albums (Ultratop Flanders)	61
Belgian Albums (Ultratop Wallonia)	74
Canadian Albums (Billboard)	7
French Albums (SNEP)	74
German Albums (Offizielle Top 100)	61
Irish Albums (IRMA)	14
Italian Compilation Albums (FIMI)	14
New Zealand Albums (RMNZ)	4
Polish Albums (ZPAV)	36
Scottish Albums (Official Charts)	4
Spanish Albums (PROMUSICAE)	65
Swiss Albums (Schweizer Hitparade)	40
UK Albums (Official Charts)	4
UK Soundtrack Albums (Official Charts)	1
US Billboard 200	3
US Kid Albums (Billboard)	1
US Soundtrack Albums (Billboard)	1

=== Year-end charts ===
Chart (2016)	Position
Australian Albums (ARIA)	37
UK Albums (OCC)	55
US Soundtrack Albums (Billboard)	14
Chart (2017)	Position
Australian Albums (ARIA)	6
Canadian Albums (Billboard)	19
New Zealand Albums (RMNZ)	21
UK Albums (OCC)	23
US Billboard 200	11
US Soundtrack Albums (Billboard)	2
Chart (2018)	Position
US Billboard 200	80
US Soundtrack Albums (Billboard)	5
Chart (2019)	Position
US Soundtrack Albums (Billboard)	10
Chart (2020)	Position
US Soundtrack Albums (Billboard)	12
Chart (2021)	Position
US Soundtrack Albums (Billboard)	8
Chart (2022)	Position
US Soundtrack Albums (Billboard)	16
Chart (2023)	Position
US Soundtrack Albums (Billboard)	14
Chart (2024)	Position
US Soundtrack Albums (Billboard)	15
Chart (2025)	Position
US Soundtrack Albums (Billboard)	21

=== Decade-end charts ===
Chart (2010–2019)	Position
US Billboard 200	97

== Certifications ==
Region	Certification	Certified units/sales
Australia (ARIA)	Platinum	70,000^{^}
Brazil (Pro-Música Brasil)	Platinum	40,000^{‡}
Canada (Music Canada)	2× Platinum	160,000^{‡}
Denmark (IFPI Danmark)	Gold	10,000^{‡}
Mexico (AMPROFON)	Gold	30,000^{‡}
New Zealand (RMNZ)	3× Platinum	45,000^{‡}
Poland (ZPAV)	Platinum	20,000^{‡}
Sweden (GLF)	Platinum	40,000^{‡}
United Kingdom (BPI)	Platinum	288,000
United States (RIAA)	2× Platinum	2,000,000^{‡}
^{^} Shipments figures based on certification alone.^{‡} Sales+streaming figures based on certification alone.

== Release history ==
Country	Date	Format	Label	Ref.
Canada	September 23, 2016	CD	Sony	
France	September 23, 2016	CD; digital download	RCA	
Germany	September 23, 2016	Digital download	Sony	
Italy	September 23, 2016	CD; digital download	Sony	
Spain	September 23, 2016	CD; digital download	Sony	
United Kingdom	September 23, 2016	CD; digital download	RCA	
United States	September 23, 2016	CD; digital download	RCA	
Germany	September 30, 2016	CD	Sony	
Germany	October 21, 2016	CD (Deutsche Version)	Sony	
Canada	October 21, 2016	LP	Sony	
France	October 21, 2016	LP	RCA	
Germany	October 21, 2016	LP	Sony	
Italy	October 21, 2016	LP	Sony	
United Kingdom	October 21, 2016	LP	RCA	
United States	October 21, 2016	LP	RCA	
Japan	November 2, 2016	CD	Sony Japan	
