= L'étoile (song) =

Single by Celine Dion

from the album Encore un soir
- Language: French
- Released: 11 October 2016
- Recorded: 2016
- Studio: At the Palms (Las Vegas); Charmettes; Tick Tone Music; Plearmusic; TMP; Angel (London); RAK (London); Lion Share (Hollywood)
- Genre: Pop
- Length: 3:14
- Label: Columbia
- Songwriters: Grand Corps Malade; Manon Romiti; Silvio Lisbonne; Florent Mothe
- Producers: Silvio Lisbonne; Tiborg

Celine Dion singles chronology
"Recovering" (2016)	"L'étoile" (2016)	"Si c'était à refaire" (2016)

Lyric video
- "L'étoile" on YouTube

"L'étoile" (lit. 'The star') is a song by Canadian singer Celine Dion from her album Encore un soir (2016). It was released on 11 October 2016 as the album's second single in Canada. The lyrics were written by Grand Corps Malade, while the music was composed by Mutine (Manon Romiti and Silvio Lisbonne) and Florent Mothe. Lisbonne produced the track, with Tiborg credited as an additional producer. On 4 January 2017, "L'étoile" was released as the album's third single in France.

== Commercial performance ==
In early September 2016, following the release of Encore un soir, "L'étoile" entered the French Digital Singles Chart at number 189 and the French Overall Singles Chart at number 191. In late November 2016, the song entered the Canadian Adult Contemporary chart at number 40 and rose to number 35 in December 2016. It later peaked at number 35 on the French Radio Chart in March 2017 and at number 44 on the Airplay Chart in Belgium's Wallonia in June 2017. It became the third top‑40 single from Encore un soir on the French Radio Chart. "L'étoile" also appeared on the Ultratip charts in Belgium, reaching number six in Wallonia and number 13 in Flanders.

== Music video ==
On 5 February 2017, the lyric video for "L'étoile" was uploaded to Vevo.

== Live performances ==
Dion performed "L'étoile" during her 2017 tour.

== Charts ==
Chart performance
Chart (2016–2017)	Peak position
Belgium (Ultratip Bubbling Under Flanders)	13
Belgium (Ultratip Bubbling Under Wallonia)	6
Belgium (Ultratop Airplay Wallonia)	44
Canada AC (Billboard)	35
France (SNEP)	191
France Radio (SNEP)	35

== Release history ==
Release history
Region	Date	Format	Label	Ref.
Canada	11 October 2016	Contemporary hit radio	Columbia	
Italy	28 October 2016	Contemporary hit radio	Columbia	
France	4 January 2017	Contemporary hit radio	Columbia	
Belgium	8 February 2017	Contemporary hit radio	Columbia	
