= Summer Tour 2016 =

2016 concert tour by Celine Dion

- Tour by Celine Dion
- Promotional poster for the tour
- Location: Belgium; France; Canada
- Associated album: Encore un soir
- Start date: 20 June 2016
- End date: 31 August 2016
- No. of shows: 28
- Attendance: 347,332
- Box office: $56 million

Celine Dion concert chronology
- European Tour 2013 (2013); Summer Tour 2016 (2016); Celine Dion Live 2017 (2017)

The Summer Tour 2016 was the twelfth concert tour by Canadian singer Celine Dion. It was organized to support Dion's fifteenth French-language and twenty-sixth studio album, Encore un soir (2016), released on 26 August 2016. It was Dion's first tour since the European Tour 2013 in 2013. With 28 shows, it was also her biggest Francophone tour since the D'eux Tour in 1995–96. The tour began in Antwerp, Belgium on 20 June 2016 and concluded on 31 August 2016 in Trois-Rivières, Québec. The Summer Tour 2016 grossed $56 million.

== Background ==
On 9 November 2015, Dion's official website announced six shows in the province of Quebec: four in Montreal and two in Quebec City. Owing to very high demand, six additional shows were added in Montreal, and two in Quebec City, bringing the total to fourteen North American dates. On 11 November, two shows in Paris were announced, followed by two in Antwerp the next day. Due to high demand on the first day of general ticket sales for the Paris shows, four more dates were added. An additional date in Quebec City and two extra shows in Paris were announced in March 2016. Following the death of Dion's husband, René Angélil, it was announced that the upcoming French album would be released later in 2016.

On 12 April 2016, Dion announced she would perform a benefit concert at the newly built Amphithéâtre Cogeco in Trois-Rivières, Québec on 30 August 2016. The show would benefit Foundation Céline Dion. A second show on 31 August was announced on 31 May 2016. These were the only outdoor venue concerts of the tour. On 10 May 2016, Dion announced on her official website that she added another show to her series of concerts at the AccorHotels Arena. After eight sold-out shows, an additional date was added on 9 July 2016.

During the tour Dion performed songs from her older catalogue that she had rarely or never done live (mainly from 1 fille & 4 types): "Et je t'aime encore", "Le vol d'un ange", "Apprends-moi", "Ne bouge pas", "Valse adieu", "Tous les secrets", "Tous les blues sont écrits pour toi", and "Vole". She also performed three new tracks from the Encore un soir album: "Trois heures vingt", "Encore un soir", and "Ordinaire". In Montreal, "À la plus haute branche" was added to the setlist as a new track replacing "Un garçon pas comme les autres (Ziggy)". Before the first concert in Montreal, Dion met its writer, Daniel Picard. On 31 July, "Je n'ai pas besoin d'amour" was included exclusively in the setlist. Unlike previous tours, Dion performed without wardrobe changes, although she used different costumes on different dates.

== Commercial performance ==
The launch of Dion's summer tour in Europe topped Billboard's Hot Tours ranking of the week's highest-grossing tours. The tour began with a two-night engagement at the 20,000-seat Sportpaleis in Antwerp, with sellout crowds on 20 and 21 June 2016, followed by a nine-show run at AccorHotels Arena in Paris from 24 June through 9 July 2016. Combined, the eleven shows, all sellouts, sold 141,800 tickets and grossed $23.2 million. In Paris, the gross of over $18.4 million from 110,052 sold seats made the nine-show engagement the fourth-highest-grossing concert run of 2016.

Dion also sold out her concerts in Canada. She sold 138,164 tickets in Montreal, grossing $16.1 million, and 67,368 tickets in Quebec City, with a gross of $8.6 million. Dion's two benefit concerts in Trois-Rivières raised $1.7 million for the Fondation Céline Dion. The tour grossed $56 million in total, becoming one of the most successful tours of 2016. Dion placed tenth on the Pollstar 2016 Year End Top 100 worldwide tours list with a total gross of $85.5 million.

== Broadcasts and recordings ==
For the final concert in Paris on 9 July 2016, Dion's Facebook page live-streamed the first six songs of the show: "Trois heures vingt", "Encore un soir", "Je crois toi", "Qui peut vivre sans amour?", "Immensité", and "Et je t'aime encore". The first three songs from the first Canadian concert were also streamed on radio in Quebec. After the opening show in Montreal, Dion held a press conference that was streamed on Facebook.

The performance of "My Heart Will Go On" was recorded on 1 August 2016 in Montreal and aired on ABC's Greatest Hits Live Finale: 1980-2005 on 4 August 2016. A TV special titled "Céline Dion: Accès Illimité" aired on TVA on 2 October 2016. It included excerpts of various songs from different stops on the tour. On 19 October 2017, as part of Spirit Day, Dion shared on Facebook the performance of "Purple Rain", recorded in Montreal on 4 August 2016.

== Tour dates ==
List of concerts
Date (2016)	City	Country	Venue	Opening act	Attendance	Revenue
20 June	Antwerp	Belgium	Sportpaleis	Véronic DiCaire	31,748 / 31,748	$4,742,823
21 June	Antwerp	Belgium	Sportpaleis	Véronic DiCaire	31,748 / 31,748	$4,742,823
24 June	Paris	France	AccorHotels Arena	André-Philippe Gagnon	110,052 / 110,052	$18,428,543
25 June	Paris	France	AccorHotels Arena	André-Philippe Gagnon	110,052 / 110,052	$18,428,543
28 June	Paris	France	AccorHotels Arena	André-Philippe Gagnon	110,052 / 110,052	$18,428,543
29 June	Paris	France	AccorHotels Arena	André-Philippe Gagnon	110,052 / 110,052	$18,428,543
2 July	Paris	France	AccorHotels Arena	André-Philippe Gagnon	110,052 / 110,052	$18,428,543
3 July	Paris	France	AccorHotels Arena	André-Philippe Gagnon	110,052 / 110,052	$18,428,543
6 July	Paris	France	AccorHotels Arena	André-Philippe Gagnon	110,052 / 110,052	$18,428,543
7 July	Paris	France	AccorHotels Arena	André-Philippe Gagnon	110,052 / 110,052	$18,428,543
9 July	Paris	France	AccorHotels Arena	André-Philippe Gagnon	110,052 / 110,052	$18,428,543
31 July	Montreal	Canada	Bell Centre	André-Philippe Gagnon	138,164 / 138,164	$16,121,027
1 August	Montreal	Canada	Bell Centre	André-Philippe Gagnon	138,164 / 138,164	$16,121,027
4 August	Montreal	Canada	Bell Centre	André-Philippe Gagnon	138,164 / 138,164	$16,121,027
5 August	Montreal	Canada	Bell Centre	André-Philippe Gagnon	138,164 / 138,164	$16,121,027
8 August	Montreal	Canada	Bell Centre	André-Philippe Gagnon	138,164 / 138,164	$16,121,027
9 August	Montreal	Canada	Bell Centre	André-Philippe Gagnon	138,164 / 138,164	$16,121,027
12 August	Montreal	Canada	Bell Centre	André-Philippe Gagnon	138,164 / 138,164	$16,121,027
13 August	Montreal	Canada	Bell Centre	André-Philippe Gagnon	138,164 / 138,164	$16,121,027
16 August	Montreal	Canada	Bell Centre	André-Philippe Gagnon	138,164 / 138,164	$16,121,027
17 August	Montreal	Canada	Bell Centre	André-Philippe Gagnon	138,164 / 138,164	$16,121,027
20 August	Quebec City	Canada	Videotron Centre	André-Philippe Gagnon	67,368 / 67,368	$8,568,865
21 August	Quebec City	Canada	Videotron Centre	André-Philippe Gagnon	67,368 / 67,368	$8,568,865
24 August	Quebec City	Canada	Videotron Centre	André-Philippe Gagnon	67,368 / 67,368	$8,568,865
25 August	Quebec City	Canada	Videotron Centre	André-Philippe Gagnon	67,368 / 67,368	$8,568,865
27 August	Quebec City	Canada	Videotron Centre	André-Philippe Gagnon	67,368 / 67,368	$8,568,865
30 August^{[A]}	Trois-Rivières	Canada	Amphithéâtre Cogeco	André-Philippe Gagnon	—N/a	—N/a
31 August^{[A]}	Trois-Rivières	Canada	Amphithéâtre Cogeco	André-Philippe Gagnon	—N/a	—N/a
Total					347,332 / 347,332 (100%)	$47,861,258

^{A} This concert benefited Foundation Céline Dion.

== Band ==
- Scott Price – musical director, piano
- Dominique Messier – drums
- Yves Labonté – bass
- Kaven Girouard – guitars
- Guillaume Marchand – keyboards
- Paul Picard – percussion
- Élise Duguay – background vocals, tin whistle, cello
- Barnev Valsaint – background vocals
- Dawn Cumberbatch – background vocals
- Philippe Dunnigan – violin
- Jenny Elfving – violin
- Laraine Kaizer – violin
- Rebecca Ramsey – violin
- Svetlin Belneev – violin
- Lisa Dondlinger – violin
- Lenka Hajkova – violin
- John Arnold – violin
- De Ann Letourneau – violin
- Jerome Gordon – viola
- Kaila Potts – viola
- Dmitri Kourka – viola
- Lindsey Springer – cello
- Raymond Sicam III – cello
- Irina Chirkova – cello
- Judy Kang – cello
- Eric Tewalt – woodwinds
- Philip Wigfall – woodwinds
- Matt Fronke – trumpet
- Kurt Evanson – trumpet
- Nico Edgerman – trumpet
- Don Lorice – trumpet
- Daniel Falcone – trombone
- Nathan Tanouye – trombone
