= Can't Stop the Feeling! =

2016 single by Justin Timberlake

Single by Justin Timberlake

from the album Trolls: Original Motion Picture Soundtrack
- Released: May 6, 2016
- Genre: Disco-pop; dance-pop; soul-pop; Teen pop
- Length: 3:58
- Label: RCA
- Songwriters: Justin Timberlake; Max Martin; Karl Schuster
- Producers: Justin Timberlake; Max Martin; Shellback

Justin Timberlake singles chronology
| "Drink You Away" (2015) | "Can't Stop the Feeling!" (2016) | "Filthy" (2018) |

Music video
- "Can't Stop the Feeling!" on YouTube

Audio sample
- file; help

"Can't Stop the Feeling!" (stylized in all caps) is a song by American singer Justin Timberlake. It was released on May 6, 2016, as the lead single of the soundtrack to the film Trolls (2016), in which Timberlake voiced the character "Branch" and served as the executive music producer. It was written and produced by Timberlake, Max Martin, and Karl Schuster. Musically, "Can't Stop the Feeling!" is an uptempo disco-pop and soul-pop number with funk influences.

"Can't Stop the Feeling!" was released as a single on May 6, 2016, six months before the film debuted, and serviced to contemporary hit radio on May 10, 2016. Timberlake gave his first televised performance of "Can't Stop the Feeling!" during the interval act of the Eurovision Song Contest 2016 grand final. It was followed by a music video directed by Mark Romanek, which was released on May 16, 2016. The music video follows Timberlake on a tour of everyday places as he dances through a typical day. A wide number of fan-made videos followed the song's video release. In May 2019, the song became Timberlake's first video to reach one billion views on YouTube.

"Can't Stop the Feeling!" reached number one on the US Billboard Hot 100, opening with 379,000 downloads in its first week, becoming Timberlake's fifth number-one single and his first in nine years, and making it the twenty-sixth song in Hot 100 history to start at the summit of the chart. It also topped national singles charts in several countries, including Canada, France, Germany, Sweden, and Switzerland, and reached number one on airplay or component charts in countries including Hungary, Ireland, Italy, Russia, Slovenia, and South Africa.

== Background and composition ==
In the early stages of recording his fifth studio album, Timberlake also served as the executive music producer for the soundtrack to the film Trolls. The uptempo disco-pop track was written and produced by Timberlake, Max Martin and Shellback. Entertainment Weekly described the song as a "funky mix of disco and pop," and The A.V. Club called it "a soul-pop sugar rush tweaked for maximum dance grooves". "Can't Stop the Feeling!" is written in the key of C major with a tempo of 113 beats per minute. The song follows a chord progression of C – Am7 – Fmaj9 – Am7, and Timberlake's vocals span two octaves, from E_{3} to E_{5}. The track features a "jazzy", uptempo beat and a falsetto chorus.

"This movie feels like one big, trippy disco experience. But we didn't have a disco song," said Timberlake of the Trolls soundtrack. "We had 'September' [by Earth, Wind & Fire], but we thought this was a great opportunity to do a modern disco song. I think that disco is a really underappreciated genre". "Can't Stop the Feeling!" appears in the denouement of the movie, and is inspired by the final scene. Timberlake commented the song was inspired by Bill Withers' "Lovely Day".

== Critical reception ==
The song received positive reviews from music critics. Writers from Billboard, Rolling Stone, Fuse and USA Today highlighted its attractiveness for the summer season. Adelle Platon from Billboard called it "delightful" and a "feel-good jam". Nate Chinen from The New York Times wrote, "Timberlake is on firm footing here, gliding over a disco-pop beat and urging all comers to catch the spirit". Jon Niles from Music Times wrote, "The song gives off a feeling of pure joy that only a talent as great as Timberlake could bring to the table". For Lisa Respers France of CNN Entertainment, "If Friday had a sound, it would be Justin Timberlake's "Can't Stop the Feeling!"". Ed Masley wrote in AZCentral, "the lyrics sound like they were custom-made to be the soundtrack to your favorite summer memories". For The A.V. Club, Annie Zaleski wrote, "a perfect summer song is one I can blast while driving in the car with the windows down. The tune doesn't have to be meaningful—in fact, the more lightweight, the better—and it should offer a few minutes of unadulterated escapism. This year, I can already tell that "Can't Stop The Feeling!" is my hot-weather jam".

The A.V. Club included it among the 40 best songs of the first half of 2016. Billboard critics ranked "Can't Stop the Feeling!" at number 33 on their "100 Best Pop Songs of 2016" list, adding, "the rhythm is eventually gonna get you to dance". Digital Spy considered it the 19th-best pop song of the year, while Idolator named it the 20th-best song of the year for being "feel-good" and "infectious". Conversely, contributors for Time and Spin gave it unfavorable reviews, with the former naming it the worst song of 2016 and the latter stating, "There are certain songs notable not only for their popularity, but for an insufferable repetition".

== Accolades ==
"Can't Stop the Feeling!" won the Grammy Award for Best Song Written for Visual Media and received two honors at the 2016 Hollywood Film Awards. The track was also nominated for Best Original Song at the Academy Awards, Golden Globes, Critics' Choice Awards, Satellite Awards, and by the Guild of Music Supervisors Awards for Best Song/Recording Created for a Film.

"Can't Stop the Feeling!" won the award for Song of the Year at the 2017 iHeartRadio Music Awards and Favorite Song at the 43rd People's Choice Awards, where it was also nominated for Best Song from a Movie. At the 2016 Teen Choice Awards, it received nominations for Choice Summer Song, Choice Party Song, and Choice Song from a Movie or TV Show. It received nominations for Song of the Summer at the 2016 MTV Video Music Awards, for International Song of the Year at the 2016 NRJ Music Awards, and for Favorite Song at the 2017 Kids' Choice Awards. The 2016 BBC Music Awards shortlisted it for Song of the Year nominee. Among other international awards, it was nominated at the Australian APRA Music Awards in the category International Work of the Year, at the Hungarian Music Awards in Modern Pop-Rock Album/Record of the Year, and at the Mexican Telehit Awards in Song of the Year. "Can't Stop The Feeling!" was also nominated for the 2017 Radio Disney Music Awards in the categories Song of the Year and Song to Dance to, and at the 2017 MTV Movie & TV Awards for Best Musical Moment.

At the 2017 Billboard Music Awards, it won the awards for Top Selling Song and Top Radio Song, and was also nominated for Top Hot 100 Song. The American Society of Composers, Authors and Publishers (ASCAP) recognized it as one of the most performed songs of 2016 and 2017. It was also nominated for the World Soundtrack Award for Best Original Song Written Directly for a Film.

== Commercial performance ==
"Can't Stop the Feeling!" reached number one on the US Billboard Hot 100 issued for May 28, 2016, becoming Timberlake's fifth number-one single and his first in nine years; it received a 4× platinum certification from the Recording Industry Association of America. The song peaked at number two on the UK singles chart and received a 5× platinum certification from the British Phonographic Industry. It reached number one on the Canadian Hot 100 issued for May 28, 2016, and became Timberlake's third number-one single. "Can't Stop the Feeling!" was certified diamond in Canada by Music Canada. In Australia, the song charted at number three and received an 11× platinum certification from the Australian Recording Industry Association. It peaked at number two in New Zealand and was certified 8× platinum.

"Can't Stop the Feeling!" charted at number one in Argentina, Brazil, Belgium, the Czech Republic, Ecuador, France, Germany, Hungary, Iceland, Ireland, Israel, Italy, the Netherlands, Russia, Scotland, Slovakia, Slovenia, South Africa, Sweden, Switzerland, and Venezuela. It peaked at number two in Austria, Chile, Denmark, Finland, Greece, Latvia, and Poland. "Can't Stop the Feeling!" was certified 3× diamond in Brazil, diamond in France, Germany, and Poland, 8× platinum in Sweden, 5× platinum in Denmark and Italy, 4× platinum in Belgium and Mexico, 3× platinum in Spain, 2× platinum in Switzerland, and platinum in Austria and Portugal.

== Music video ==
The first video, titled "First Listen", featured cast members from DreamWorks Animation's Trolls, among them Anna Kendrick, Gwen Stefani, James Corden, Zooey Deschanel, Ron Funches, Caroline Hjelt, Aino Jawo, Christopher Mintz-Plasse, and Kunal Nayyar.

A screenshot from the clip showing the scene inspired by Anchors Aweigh

The song's official music video was released on May 16, 2016. Helmed by director Mark Romanek, it follows Timberlake on a tour to everyday places in Los Angeles like a laundromat, diner, barbershop, and a donut shop, with an individual dancing along to the single at every stop. All the revelers eventually end up congregating with Timberlake below a highway underpass, where they dance together. As described by Time editor Cady Lang, Timberlake "dances through what a typical day might be: breakfast at the diner and grocery shopping". Talking to Entertainment Weekly, director Mark Romanek described the concept as "just the overall feeling of unironic and sincere humanism. It's not trying to be cool or slick or ironic. It's just fun. Most of the time, people are excellent. It's just a big sugar cookie. It makes people smile for four minutes". He stated the brief dance-off between Timberlake and an inflatable arm-waving tube man was inspired by Gene Kelly dancing with Jerry the mouse in Anchors Aweigh. Bustle writer Amy Mackelden highlighted the scene as the best moment of the video. Esquire editor Jonathan Evans addressed Timberlake's monochromatic outfit, writing "the singer nails it by playing with shades of the color [white], plus throwing some pattern and texture in the mix".

The video received nominations for Best Male Video International at the 2016 MTV Video Music Awards Japan, Best Music Video at the 2017 iHeartRadio Music Awards, and Favorite Music Video at the 2017 Nickelodeon Kids' Choice Awards.

== Live performances ==
On May 9, 2016, it was announced that Timberlake would perform his song during the interval act of the Eurovision Song Contest 2016 grand final, which took place in Stockholm, Sweden, on May 14, 2016. Timberlake opened the performance singing "Rock Your Body", soon switching over to "Can't Stop the Feeling!". He was joined by a group of backup singers/dancers and a horn section for the song's televised debut. The performance was not aired in the US due to copyright issues. The day before the main show, Timberlake made his first appearance before an audience on night rehearsal to perform both songs.

On February 26, 2017, Timberlake opened the 89th Academy Awards with a performance of "Can't Stop the Feeling!", which included an R&B breakdown and a cover of Bill Withers' "Lovely Day". Timberlake began the performance in the front corridor of the Dolby Theatre, dancing his way to the stage with his backup dancers. The song was also the closing number of his Super Bowl LII halftime show performance.

The song was featured in the set lists of The Man of the Woods Tour (2018–2019) and The Forget Tomorrow World Tour (2024–2025).

== Usage in other media ==
In June 2016, Billboard named "Can't Stop the Feeling!" the wedding DJs' fourth most popular party song in the US. Numerous fan-made videos followed the video's release, including from the Memphis Grizzlies, the United States Olympic Committee, citizens of Memphis and Gilbert, and graduates of the University of Wisconsin–Milwaukee, among others. On May 26, 2016, Victoria's Secret Angels released a video in which they lip-synced to the song.

Choreographers Celia Rowlson-Hall and Crishon Landers, with the help of film producer Mia Lidofsky, created a flash mob dance video on October 2, 2016, in support of the Hillary Clinton 2016 presidential campaign set to the music of "Can't Stop the Feeling!" — with all of the dancers wearing pantsuits in reference to Hillary Clinton's outfit of choice. They called the event #Pantsuitpower Flashmob for Hillary. The video was covered in news media including The Washington Post, The Guardian, and Vogue, and garnered over 2 million views on Facebook. From New York City, the Pantsuit Power movement then spread to Raleigh, North Carolina on October 23, 2016, with another flash mob. The song was also used for an opening video for the 2017 Western Conservative Summit, featuring Republican politicians from Colorado.

"Can't Stop the Feeling!" is the encore number in the Broadway musical & Juliet, which is composed of hit pop songs written by Max Martin. The song is also part of the main storyline of rhythm video game Just Dance 2023 Edition.

== Other versions and covers ==
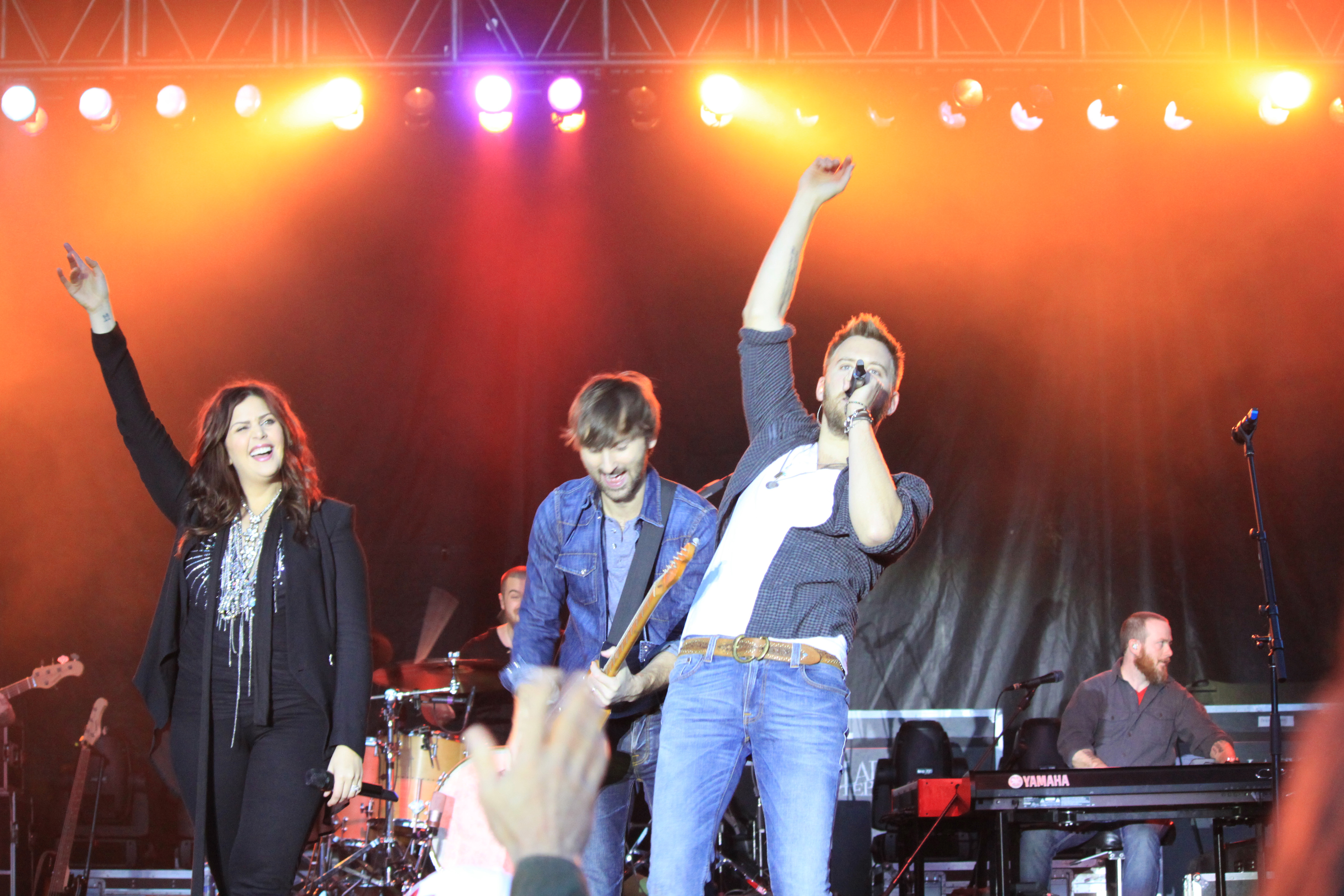
Lady A covering the song in a live performance

The film version featured in the soundtrack album includes additional vocals from Anna Kendrick, James Corden, Zooey Deschanel and Gwen Stefani.

In June 2016, American country music group Lady A covered the song in a live performance in Columbus, Ohio. Jon Freeman of Rolling Stone commented it "evoked the loose spirit of a jam band unwinding at a summer festival". Country performer Hunter Hayes covered the song when he headlined The Paramount in Huntington, New York in June 2017. An editor from Digital Journal opined it was "in a clever fashion, which was a great deal of fun, both for him and the audience".

== Credits and personnel ==
Credits are adapted from the liner notes of the CD single of "Can't Stop the Feeling!".

Locations

- Engineered at MXM Studios and Conway Recording Studios in Los Angeles, California, and MXM Studios in Stockholm, Sweden
- Recorded (horns) at Studio Willow-Valley in Gothenburg, Sweden
- Mixed at MixStar Studios in Virginia Beach, Virginia
- Mastered at Sterling Sound Studios in New York City

Personnel

- Justin Timberlake – lead vocals, writing, production, percussion
- Max Martin – writing, production, background vocals, keyboards, programming
- Shellback – writing, production, drums, bass, background vocals, keyboards, programming, percussion
- Elliot Ives – guitars
- Wojtek Goral – saxophone, horns arrangement
- Janne Bjerger – trumpet
- Peter "Noos" Johansson – trombone
- Mattias Bylund – horns, horns arrangement, horns recording and editing
- Noah "Mailbox" Passovoy – engineering
- Samuel Holland – engineering
- Serban Ghenea – mixing
- John Hanes – engineering for mix
- Tom Coyne – mastering

== Charts ==
=== Weekly charts ===
Contemporaneous weekly chart performance
| Chart (2016–2017) | Peak position |
|---|---|
| Argentina Airplay (Monitor Latino) | 1 |
| Australia (ARIA) | 3 |
| Austria (Ö3 Austria Top 40) | 2 |
| Belarus Airplay (Eurofest) | 65 |
| Brazil (Hot 100 Brasil) | 1 |
| Belgium (Ultratop 50 Flanders) | 1 |
| Belgium (Ultratop 50 Wallonia) | 1 |
| Canada Hot 100 (Billboard) | 1 |
| Canada AC (Billboard) | 1 |
| Canada CHR/Top 40 (Billboard) | 1 |
| Canada Hot AC (Billboard) | 1 |
| Chile Airplay (Monitor Latino) | 2 |
| Colombia Airplay (National-Report) | 38 |
| CIS Airplay (TopHit) | 1 |
| Czech Republic Airplay (ČNS IFPI) | 1 |
| Czech Republic Singles Digital (ČNS IFPI) | 1 |
| Denmark (Tracklisten) | 2 |
| Ecuador Airplay (National-Report) | 1 |
| Euro Digital Song Sales (Billboard) | 1 |
| Finland (Suomen virallinen latauslista) | 2 |
| France (SNEP) | 1 |
| Germany (GfK) | 1 |
| Greece Digital (Billboard) | 2 |
| Hungary (Rádiós Top 40) | 1 |
| Hungary (Single Top 40) | 2 |
| Iceland (RÚV) | 1 |
| Ireland (IRMA) | 3 |
| Ireland Airplay (Radiomonitor) | 1 |
| Israel International Airplay (Media Forest) | 1 |
| Italy (FIMI) | 7 |
| Italy Airplay (EarOne) | 1 |
| Japan Hot 100 (Billboard) | 19 |
| Latvia (Latvijas Top 40) | 2 |
| Lebanon (Lebanese Top 20) | 3 |
| Luxembourg Digital Song Sales (Billboard) | 8 |
| Mexico Airplay (Monitor Latino) | 7 |
| Netherlands (Dutch Top 40) | 1 |
| Netherlands (Global Top 40) | 1 |
| Netherlands (Single Top 100) | 2 |
| New Zealand (Recorded Music NZ) | 2 |
| Norway (VG-lista) | 4 |
| Paraguay Airplay (Monitor Latino) | 12 |
| Poland Airplay (ZPAV) | 2 |
| Portugal (AFP) | 5 |
| Romania (Airplay 100) | 24 |
| Russia Airplay (TopHit) | 1 |
| Scottish Singles Sales (Official Charts) | 1 |
| Serbia Airplay (Radiomonitor) | 3 |
| Slovakia Airplay (ČNS IFPI) | 1 |
| Slovakia Singles Digital (ČNS IFPI) | 1 |
| Slovenia Airplay (SloTop50) | 1 |
| South Africa Airplay (EMA) | 1 |
| South Korea International (Gaon) | 4 |
| Spain (Promusicae) | 3 |
| Sweden (Sverigetopplistan) | 1 |
| Switzerland (Schweizer Hitparade) | 1 |
| Ukraine Airplay (TopHit) | 9 |
| UK Singles (Official Charts) | 2 |
| Uruguay Airplay (Monitor Latino) | 15 |
| US Billboard Hot 100 | 1 |
| US Adult Contemporary (Billboard) | 1 |
| US Adult Pop Airplay (Billboard) | 1 |
| US Dance Airplay (Billboard) | 5 |
| US Dance Club Songs (Billboard) | 1 |
| US Pop Airplay (Billboard) | 1 |
| US Rhythmic Airplay (Billboard) | 5 |
| Venezuela Anglo Airplay (Monitor Latino) | 4 |

2020s weekly chart performance
| Chart (2024–2026) | Peak position |
|---|---|
| Belarus Airplay (TopHit) | 104 |
| CIS Airplay (TopHit) | 183 |
| Estonia Airplay (TopHit) | 93 |
| Lithuania Airplay (TopHit) | 65 |
| Moldova Airplay (TopHit) | 167 |
| Netherlands Airplay (Dutch Charts) | 48 |

=== Monthly charts ===
2026 monthly chart performance
| Chart (2026) | Peak position |
|---|---|
| Lithuania Airplay (TopHit) | 74 |

=== Year-end charts ===
Year-end chart performance
| Chart (2016) | Position |
|---|---|
| Argentina (Monitor Latino) | 1 |
| Australia (ARIA) | 7 |
| Austria (Ö3 Austria Top 40) | 8 |
| Belgium (Ultratop Flanders) | 1 |
| Belgium (Ultratop Wallonia) | 7 |
| Brazil (Brasil Hot 100) | 22 |
| Canada (Canadian Hot 100) | 14 |
| Denmark (Tracklisten) | 6 |
| France (SNEP) | 4 |
| Germany (Official German Charts) | 10 |
| Hungary (Rádiós Top 40) | 3 |
| Hungary (Single Top 40) | 5 |
| Iceland (Plötutíóindi) | 1 |
| Israel (Media Forest) | 3 |
| Italy (FIMI) | 19 |
| Japan (Japan Hot 100) | 98 |
| Mexico (Tus 25) | 1 |
| Netherlands (Dutch Top 40) | 5 |
| Netherlands (Single Top 100) | 9 |
| New Zealand (Recorded Music NZ) | 15 |
| Poland Airplay (ZPAV) | 17 |
| Slovenia Airplay (SloTop50) | 5 |
| Spain (PROMUSICAE) | 24 |
| Sweden (Sverigetopplistan) | 4 |
| Switzerland (Schweizer Hitparade) | 12 |
| UK Singles (Official Charts Company) | 10 |
| US Billboard Hot 100 | 9 |
| US Adult Contemporary (Billboard) | 8 |
| US Adult Top 40 (Billboard) | 1 |
| US Dance Club Songs (Billboard) | 9 |
| US Dance/Mix Show Airplay (Billboard) | 21 |
| US Mainstream Top 40 (Billboard) | 10 |
| US Rhythmic (Billboard) | 41 |
| Chart (2017) | Position |
| Argentina Airplay (Monitor Latino) | 11 |
| Australia (ARIA) | 71 |
| Belgium (Ultratop Flanders) | 84 |
| Brazil Streaming (Pro-Música Brasil) | 153 |
| Canada (Canadian Hot 100) | 50 |
| Denmark (Tracklisten) | 92 |
| France (SNEP) | 130 |
| Hungary (Rádiós Top 40) | 27 |
| Hungary (Single Top 40) | 28 |
| Israel International Airplay (Media Forest) | 16 |
| Latvia Airplay (LaIPA) | 95 |
| Poland Airplay (ZPAV) | 86 |
| Spain Airplay (PROMUSICAE) | 16 |
| Sweden (Sverigetopplistan) | 95 |
| Switzerland (Schweizer Hitparade) | 64 |
| UK Singles (Official Charts Company) | 83 |
| US Billboard Hot 100 | 49 |
| US Adult Contemporary (Billboard) | 6 |
| Chart (2018) | Position |
| Argentina Airplay (Monitor Latino) | 67 |
| Iceland (Plötutíóindi) | 58 |
| Chart (2025) | Position |
| Argentina Anglo Airplay (Monitor Latino) | 48 |
| Chile Airplay (Monitor Latino) | 67 |
| Estonia Airplay (TopHit) | 134 |

=== Decade-end charts ===
Decade-end chart performance
| Chart (2010–2019) | Position |
|---|---|
| Australia (ARIA) | 41 |
| UK Singles (OCC) | 28 |
| US Billboard Hot 100 | 82 |

== Certifications ==
| Region | Certification | Certified units/sales |
|---|---|---|
| Australia (ARIA) | 11× Platinum | 770,000^{‡} |
| Austria (IFPI Austria) | Platinum | 30,000^{‡} |
| Belgium (BRMA) | 4× Platinum | 80,000^{‡} |
| Brazil (Pro-Música Brasil) | 3× Diamond | 750,000^{‡} |
| Canada (Music Canada) | Diamond | 800,000^{‡} |
| Denmark (IFPI Danmark) | 5× Platinum | 450,000^{‡} |
| France (SNEP) | Diamond | 233,333^{‡} |
| Germany (BVMI) | Diamond | 1,000,000^{‡} |
| Italy (FIMI) | 5× Platinum | 250,000^{‡} |
| Mexico (AMPROFON) | 4× Platinum | 240,000^{‡} |
| New Zealand (RMNZ) | 8× Platinum | 240,000^{‡} |
| Poland (ZPAV) | Diamond | 100,000^{‡} |
| Portugal (AFP) | Platinum | 10,000^{‡} |
| South Korea (Gaon Chart) | — | 222,229 |
| Spain (Promusicae) | 3× Platinum | 120,000^{‡} |
| Sweden (GLF) | 8× Platinum | 320,000^{‡} |
| Switzerland (IFPI Switzerland) | 2× Platinum | 60,000^{‡} |
| United Kingdom (BPI) | 5× Platinum | 3,000,000^{‡} |
| United States (RIAA) | 4× Platinum | 3,280,000 |
^{‡} Sales+streaming figures based on certification alone.

== Release history ==
| Country | Date | Format | Label | Ref. |
|---|---|---|---|---|
| United States | May 6, 2016 | Digital download | RCA | |
| Italy | May 6, 2016 | Contemporary hit radio | Sony | |
| United States | May 10, 2016 | Contemporary hit radio | RCA | |
| Germany | July 15, 2016 | CD single | Sony | |
| Various | July 29, 2016 | 12" | RCA | |

== See also ==
- List of artists with the most number ones on the Billboard Mainstream Top 40 chart
- List of best-selling singles
- List of best-selling singles in Australia
- List of Billboard Hot 100 number-one singles of 2016
- List of Canadian Hot 100 number-one singles of 2016
- List of number-one hits of 2016 (France)
- List of number-one hits of 2016 (Germany)
- List of number-one hits of 2016 (Switzerland)
- List of number-one singles and albums in Sweden
- List of number-one songs of 2016 (Mexico)
- List of number-one singles of 2016 (South Africa)
- List of number-one dance singles of 2016 (U.S.)
- List of number-one adult contemporary singles of 2016 (U.S.)
- List of Ultratop 50 number-one singles of 2016
- List of airplay number-one hits of the 2010s (Argentina)
