= Sony Chan =

Hong Kong comedian, singer, radio personality, and publicist

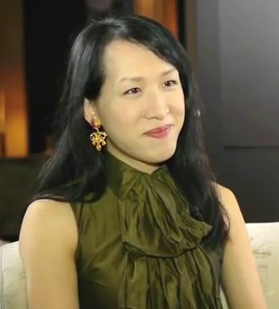
- Sony Chan in 2014
- Born: October 12, 1975 (age 50); British Hong Kong
- Citizenship: France
- Occupations: Humorist, radio commentator
- Website: sonychan.com

Sony Chan (born 12 October 1975, Hong Kong) is a French humorist and a radio commentator.

== Biography ==
In 1987, when she was 11, Sony Chan and her family moved to Alsace. In 1994, Chan began her architectural studies at Ecole d'Architecture de Strasbourg, receiving her diploma in 2001. In the meantime, she worked as an haute couture model.

== Career ==
In 2009, she released her first album, Be a star, which featured electronic music with a touch of Chinese traditional instruments. Chan appeared in the 2010 music video for Kim Novak's song, "Love Affair".

She appeared on Oui Fm in 2011 and 2012, and from 2012 to 2014 was a guest on France Inter's "On va tous y passer" first with Frédéric Lopez, then with André Manoukian. From 2013 to 2015, Chan was broadcast on Comment ça va bien ! on France 2.

In 2015, she was featured as one of the humorists on Folie passagère.

Chan performs comedy in both Cantonese and French.

== Personal life ==
Chan is a transgender woman. Concerning the questions about her gender Sony Chan says: "[...] everything depends on a perception of feelings of each person". She says that she prefers not to put herself into gender brackets to "prove that she is more than just discussion about her gender".
