= Encore un soir =

Single by Celine Dion

from the album Encore un soir
- Language: French
- Released: 24 May 2016
- Recorded: June 2015
- Studio: Hyperion (Marseille); Addictive (Paris); At the Palms (Las Vegas)
- Genre: Pop
- Length: 4:23 (album version); 3:52 (radio edit)
- Label: Columbia
- Songwriter: Jean-Jacques Goldman
- Producers: Jean-Jacques Goldman; Yann Macé; Luc Leroy

Celine Dion singles chronology
"The Show Must Go On" (2016)	"Encore un soir" (2016)	"Recovering" (2016)

Lyric video
- "Encore un soir" on YouTube

"Encore un soir" (lit. 'One more evening') is a song by Canadian singer Celine Dion. It was released on 26 August 2016 as the lead single from her French‑language album of the same name. Written by Jean-Jacques Goldman and produced by Goldman, Yann Macé, and Luc Leroy, the song is dedicated to Dion's husband René Angélil, who died in January 2016. "Encore un soir" received positive reviews from music critics and achieved significant commercial success, reaching number one in France, Quebec, and Romandy. It also entered the top 10 in Luxembourg and Belgium's Wallonia, and earned diamond certification in France and gold certification in Switzerland.

== Background and release ==
On 22 October 2015, Dion's official website announced that she was "working hard" on her new French‑language album. The title "Encore un soir" was first reported on 15 January 2016 by several news outlets. On 17 May 2016, an interview with Paris Match confirmed that the single would be released for digital download on 24 May 2016. The song was also made available on streaming platforms, including YouTube and Vevo.

== Critical reception ==
"Encore un soir" received widespread acclaim from music critics. Nicolas Houle of La Presse wrote that the song, penned by Jean-Jacques Goldman, displays notable restraint and subtlety, calling it the strongest track on the album. Alain de Repentigny of La Presse+ described the title track as an ode to life that stands out both on the album and during the live performances. The song was also praised by Le Figaro, Femme Actuelle, Ciné Télé Revue, Public.fr, Hollywood Life and Idolator as a moving tribute to Dion's late husband, René Angélil.

== Commercial performance ==
In France, "Encore un soir" debuted at number one on the singles chart after only three days of sales, with 7,809 copies sold. It replaced Justin Timberlake's "Can't Stop the Feeling!" at the top and posted the highest weekly single sales of 2016. The song also became Dion's sixth number-one single in France. With this achievement, she extended her record for the most weeks at number one on the French Singles Chart, reaching 38 weeks in total. "Encore un soir" remained at the summit for a second week, selling 5,166 digital copies. The last time Dion spent at least two weeks at number one in France was 15 years earlier with "Sous le vent".

In the following weeks, "Encore un soir" remained within the top 10. After spending two weeks at number one, it dropped to number four with 3,081 copies sold, and then to number seven with 2,377 units. It later rebounded to number four, selling 3,141 copies. Following Dion's concerts in Paris during the Summer Tour 2016, the single climbed to number two with more than 3,200 units sold. The following week, it slipped to number three with 2,998 copies sold. In its eighth week, the single held at number three with 3,601 copies sold. It rose to number two the following week, selling 2,370 units. Over the next three weeks, it charted at number nine (2,133 units), number eight (2,100), and number seven (2,000). After 12 weeks, cumulative sales in France exceeded 40,000 copies. In its 13th week, the single fell to number 10 with 1,513 units sold, before climbing back to number three the following week with more than 1,700 copies sold.

In week 15, it returned to number one with 4,421 units sold. That same week, the album Encore un soir debuted at number one. Both the single and the album remained at the top the following week. The single sold 3,969 copies that week, marking its fourth week at number one and surpassing the three‑week run of "Sous le vent". In its 17th week, the song dropped to number two with 2,786 units sold, bringing its cumulative total to 54,472 copies. On 29 July 2016, the single was certified gold by the SNEP. In week 18, it fell to number seven with 1,918 copies sold, then rose to number six the following week with 1,464 units sold. In week 20, it climbed to number four with 1,946 copies sold, before falling to number five a week later with 1,871 units sold (61,674 total). After 21 weeks inside the top 10, the single dropped to number 12, selling an additional 1,300 copies. Among Dion's singles, only "Pour que tu m'aimes encore" spent more weeks inside the French top 10, with 31. On 21 October 2016, the single was certified platinum in France for 20 million cumulative sales (downloads and streaming). On 29 December 2017, it was certified diamond in France.

After three days of sales, the song debuted at number 10 in Belgium's Wallonia, and at number seven on the Belgian Digital Songs chart. It also entered the Swiss chart at number 25, reaching number one in Romandy and number six on the Swiss Digital Songs chart. The single debuted at number four in Luxembourg, and at number 31 in Hungary. On the Euro Digital Songs chart, it entered at number 18. In Canada, also after three days of sales, the song debuted at number 15 on the Hot Digital Songs chart. It also entered the Canadian Adult Contemporary chart at number 39, and the Canadian Hot 100 at number 92. In Quebec, Dion debuted at number one on the Digital Singles Chart, where "Encore un soir" remained for 16 consecutive weeks. The song also topped the Quebec Adult Pop Songs chart for three weeks. "Encore un soir" was certified gold in both Switzerland and Canada.

== Music video ==
On 8 July 2016, Dion filmed the music video on Kleber Street in Paris. It was initially expected to premiere in August 2016. Directed by Greg & Lio (French duo Lionel Hirlé and Grégory Ohrel), the video included an appearance by French actor François Pouron. From late August 2016, short excerpts were used in French television commercials promoting the album, but the full video was never released.

== Live performances ==
Dion performed "Encore un soir" throughout her Summer Tour 2016. She sang it on television for the first time on M6's Music Show – 100% tubes 2016 on 7 September 2016. On 1 October 2016, she performed the song during Le Grand Show on France 2. Dion also included "Encore un soir" in the French dates of her 2017 tour and performed it on select dates of her Courage World Tour.

== Credits and personnel ==
Recording

- Recorded at Hyperion Studio (Marseille), Addictive Studio (Paris) and Studio at the Palms (Las Vegas)

Personnel

- Celine Dion – lead vocals
- Jean-Jacques Goldman – songwriting, production, arrangement, background vocals
- Yann Macé – production, arrangement, mixing, drums, percussion, keyboards, programming
- Luc Leroy – production, arrangement, piano, keyboards, programming
- Humberto Gatica – vocal recording
- Martin Nessi – vocal recording
- Rob Katz – vocal recording assistant
- Mark Gray – vocal recording assistant
- Jason Patterson – vocal recording assistant
- Thomas Ivaldy – recording
- Vincent Martinez – guitars
- Magali Ponsada – background vocals
- Jacques Veneruso – background vocals

== Charts ==
=== Weekly charts ===
Weekly chart performance
Chart (2016)	Peak position
Belgium (Ultratip Bubbling Under Flanders)	12
Belgium (Ultratop 50 Wallonia)	10
Canada Hot 100 (Billboard)	92
Canada AC (Billboard)	39
Euro Digital Songs (Billboard)	18
France (SNEP)	1
Hungary (Single Top 40)	31
Luxembourg Digital Songs (Billboard)	4
Quebec Digital Song Sales (ADISQ)	1
Quebec Adult Pop Songs (ADISQ)	1
Slovakia Airplay (ČNS IFPI)	52
Switzerland (Schweizer Hitparade)	25
Switzerland (Media Control Romandy)	1

=== Year-end charts ===
Year-end chart performance
Chart (2016)	Position
Belgium (Ultratop 50 Wallonia)	59
France (SNEP)	5

== Certifications ==
Certifications
Region	Certification	Certified units/sales
Canada (Music Canada)	Gold	40,000^{‡}
France (SNEP)	Diamond	233,333^{‡}
Switzerland (IFPI Switzerland)	Gold	15,000^{‡}
^{‡} Sales+streaming figures based on certification alone.

== Release history ==
Release history
Region	Date	Format	Version	Label	Ref.
Various	24 May 2016	Digital download; streaming	Radio edit	Columbia	
Italy	3 June 2016	Contemporary hit radio	Radio edit	Columbia	

== See also ==
- List of number-one hits of 2016 (France)
- List of number-one hits of 2016 (Switzerland)
