= Si c'était à refaire (song) =

Single by Celine Dion

from the album Encore un soir
- Language: French
- Released: 14 October 2016
- Recorded: 2016
- Studio: Hauts de Gammes (Paris); At the Palms (Las Vegas); Lion Share (Hollywood)
- Genre: Pop
- Length: 3:52 (album version); 3:39 (radio edit)
- Label: Columbia
- Songwriters: Alice Guiol; Jacques Veneruso
- Producers: Jacques Veneruso; Thierry Blanchard

Celine Dion singles chronology
"L'étoile" (2016)	"Si c'était à refaire" (2016)	"Je nous veux" (2017)

Audio
- "Si c'était à refaire" on YouTube

"Si c'était à refaire" (lit. 'If I had to do it all over again') is a song by Canadian singer Celine Dion from her album Encore un soir (2016). It was released on 14 October 2016 as the album's second single in France. The lyrics were written by Alice Guiol, with music composed by Jacques Veneruso. The track was produced by Veneruso and Thierry Blanchard.

== Commercial performance ==
In early September 2016, following the release of Encore un soir, "Si c'était à refaire" entered both the French Digital Singles Chart and the French Overall Singles Chart at number 100. The song later reached number 36 on the French Radio Chart in November 2016. It became the album's second top‑40 entry on that chart, following the title track, which peaked at number 18 in September 2016.

== Live performances ==
Dion performed "Si c'était à refaire" during her 2017 tour.

== Charts ==
Chart performance
Chart (2016)	Peak position
Belgium (Ultratip Bubbling Under Wallonia)	43
France (SNEP)	100
France Radio (SNEP)	36

== Release history ==
Release history
Region	Date	Format	Version	Label	Ref.
France	14 October 2016	Contemporary hit radio	Radio edit	Columbia	
