= Claudine Monfette =

Canadian actress, screenwriter and lyricist

- Born: January 31, 1945 (age 81)

Comedy career
- Genres: Quebec actress, screenwriter and lyricist

Claudine Monfette (nicknamed Mouffe; born on 31 January 1945 at Montreal, Canada) is a Quebec actress, screenwriter and lyricist.

== Biography ==
A graduate of the National Theater School in 1966, Mouffe met Robert Charlebois and became his partner. She worked with him and wrote him several of his songs, among which "Deux femmes en or" and especially "Ordinaire", a title which became one of his greatest hits.

She then wrote for the singer Renée Claude in 1975. She signs "Rêver en couleur" and "Le mur du son" to music by Robert Charlebois and "Je suis une femme" to a composition by André Gagnon.

Later, she also signed some texts for Nicole Martin (Fais-moi confiance, title appeared on the album Laisse-moi partir in 1979, then Vivre ma vie in 1982 to music by Angelo Finaldi, A retro girl in 1984...).

== Bibliography ==
Mouffe, At the heart of showbiz, biography of Carmel Dumas with the help of Mouffe, Les Éditions La Presse, 280 pages, 2020.

== Filmography ==
=== Actress ===
- 1967: Don't Let It Kill You: Madeleine
- 1968: Straight to the Heart: Encyclopédine Monfette
- 1970: Where are you?
- 1974: Bulldozer: Solange Galarneau

=== Writer ===
- 1974: Bulldozer
