= Hundred Miles =

Single by Yall featuring Gabriela Richardson
- Released: 16 October 2015
- Recorded: 2015
- Genre: Tropical house; moombahton; dancehall
- Length: 2:52
- Label: Mushroom Pillow; Sony
- Songwriters: Joan Sala; Gabriela Richardson; David Borras
- Producer: Yall

Yall singles chronology
"Hundred Miles" (2015)	"Together" (2017)

Gabriela Richardson singles chronology
"Hundred Miles" (2015)

Music video
- "Hundred Miles" on YouTube

"Hundred Miles" is a 2015 tropical house song by Barcelona-based DJ collective Yall featuring Gabriela Richardson. The song was written by David Borras Paronella, Joan Sala Gasol and Gabriela Richardson Torres. The song gained more fame after it was used in a 2015 advertisement for the Spanish casual clothing brand Desigual.

== Music video ==
The music video was released on 9 December 2015 on Vevo. The tennis-themed video shows five young girls dancing on a tennis court as Gabriela performs in solo. At the end, she is joined on the public seats with the three members of Yall. As of August 2026, the video has received over 96 million views.

== In popular culture ==
The song was used on 28 January 2016 during the French TV entertainment program Touche Pas à Mon Poste (Touche Pas à Mon Prime réalise vos vœux) presented by Cyril Hanouna where Erika Moulet dances completely nude to the tune as a tribute on the birthday of Bertrand Chameroy.

"Hundred Miles" was also used in a Netflix TV show Elite (season 1, episode 2).

The song was featured in the spring 2015 playlist of Hollister Co. stores worldwide.

== Plagiarism accusations ==
The song received heavy comparisons to Major Lazer's song "Lean On", some publications accusing the song of plagiarism. Yall's Joan Sala, responded to the accusations saying: "(It) is cool to get compared to Major Lazer in a song like this. We love Major Lazer! But as a composer, i have to say that only the first chord sounds the same. Then, the rest of the song is totally different."

== Charts and certifications ==
=== Weekly charts ===
Chart (2016)	Peak position
Austria (Ö3 Austria Top 40)	28
Belgium (Ultratop 50 Flanders)	19
Belgium (Ultratop 50 Wallonia)	1
Czech Republic Airplay (ČNS IFPI)	17
France (SNEP)	2
Germany (GfK)	23
Poland Airplay (ZPAV)	41
Russia Airplay (TopHit)	5
Spain (Promusicae)	7
Switzerland (Schweizer Hitparade)	13

=== Year-end charts ===
Chart (2016)	Position
Belgium (Ultratop Flanders)	93
Belgium (Ultratop Wallonia)	11
Germany (Official German Charts)	90
Russia Airplay (TopHit)	33
Switzerland (Schweizer Hitparade)	79

=== Certifications ===
Region	Certification	Certified units/sales
Belgium (BRMA)	Gold	10,000^{‡}
France (SNEP)	Diamond	233,333^{‡}
Germany (BVMI)	Gold	200,000^{‡}
Italy (FIMI)	Gold	25,000^{‡}
Spain (Promusicae)	Platinum	60,000^{‡}
^{‡} Sales+streaming figures based on certification alone.
