= Celine Dion Live 2017 =

International concert tour

- Tour by Celine Dion
- Promotional poster for the tour
- Location: Europe
- Associated albums: Encore un soir
- Start date: 15 June 2017
- End date: 5 August 2017
- Legs: 1
- No. of shows: 25
- Box office: $63.3 million

Celine Dion concert chronology
- Summer Tour 2016 (2016); Celine Dion Live 2017 (2017); Celine Dion Live 2018 (2018)

Celine Dion Live 2017 was the thirteenth concert tour by French Canadian singer Celine Dion. The tour was organized to support Dion's 2016 French-language studio album, Encore un Soir. For the anglophone shows, Dion performed her song "How Does a Moment Last Forever" (from the 2017 version of "Beauty and the Beast"), along with a selection of rare songs and fan favourites. With 25 shows, the tour began in Copenhagen, Denmark on 15 June 2017 and concluded on 5 August 2017 in Glasgow, Scotland.

== Background ==
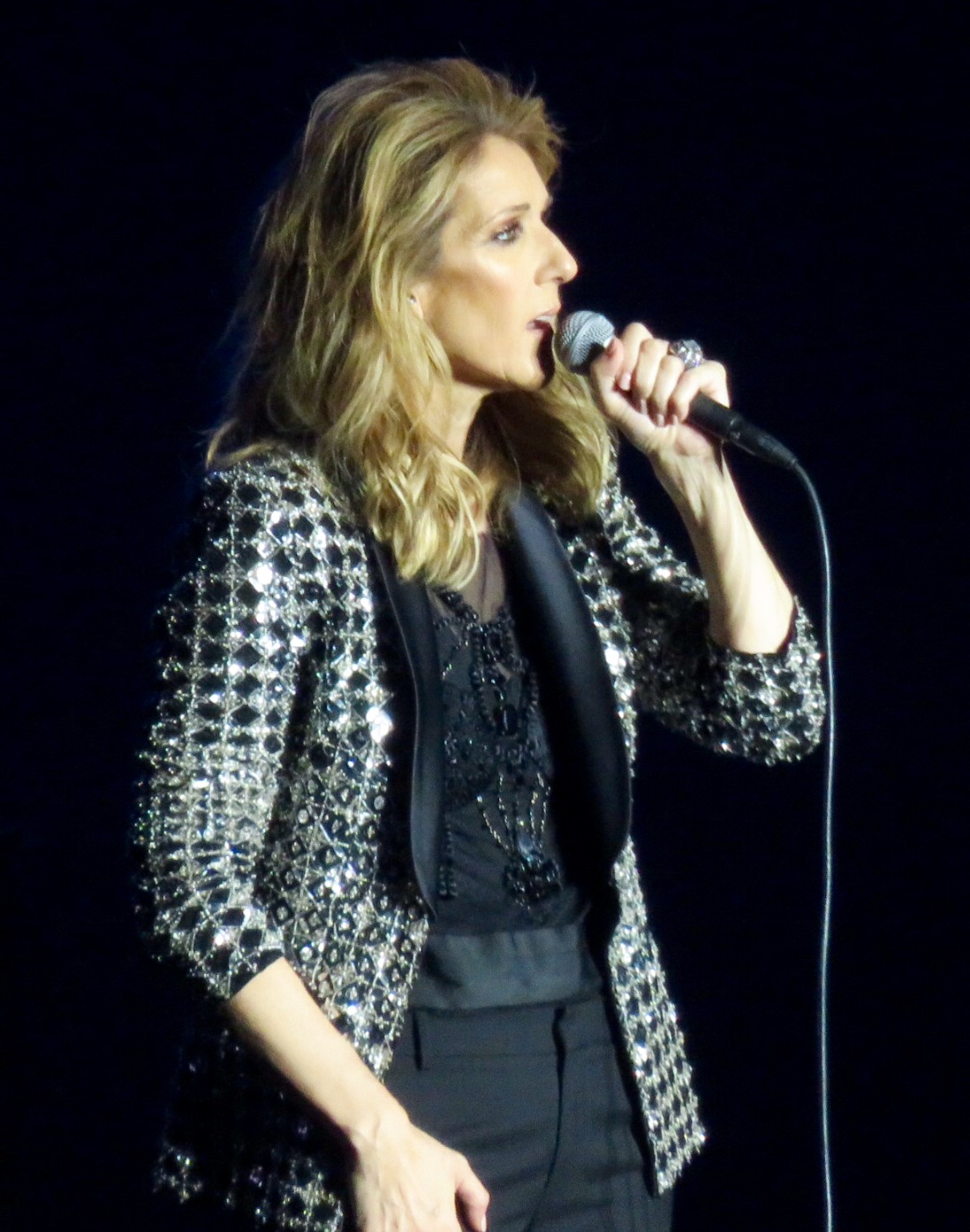
Dion at Birmingham's NIA in August 2017

After Dion's large-scale Taking Chances World Tour in 2008-2009 in support of her album Taking Chances, she began a new concert residency at The Colosseum at Caesars Palace in Las Vegas in 2011, with a contract running through 2019. On 25 January 2017, Dion's official website announced 16 shows in Europe scheduled for the summer of 2017. Tickets for those dates went on sale to the general public on 3 February 2017. Eight additional concerts—in London, Paris, Lille, Manchester, Birmingham, and Berlin—were later added. On 31 March 2017, the SSE Hydro posted an intimation of a concert in Glasgow, Scotland. Full details were released during the first week of April 2017. Véronic DiCaire joined Dion as the opening act.

On 14 June 2017, it was announced that both shows scheduled at Manchester Arena on 25 June and 1 August would be rescheduled due to the ongoing investigation following the Manchester Arena bombing. The concerts were moved to the First Direct Arena in Leeds, United Kingdom, and took place on 25 June 2017 and 2 August 2017.

== Critical reception ==
The tour received positive reviews. The Independent rated the concert five stars out of five, calling it "a flawless show with zero pretence" and praising Dion's "unstoppable vocals". The Guardian rated the concert four stars out of five. London Evening Standard also awarded four stars out of five, noting that Dion "didn't just crank out soulful power ballads" and describing her as "a stage-strutting, air-punching, kiss-blowing bundle of fun, gratitude, and good humour". Gay Times also praised the show, writing that Dion proved she was very much at the height of her career. In a positive review, Metro wrote that Dion's "vocals can easily be considered the eighth wonder of the world". According to the Official Charts Company, Dion's concert was "almost a religious experience". Her concert in Leeds on 25 June was given a five star rating by the Manchester Evening News. Performing on a stage with a backdrop reading "Leeds in loving support of Manchester", Dion was praised for her energy and for delivering a note and pitch perfect performance.

== Commercial performance ==
Dion sold out all of her European concerts. She also broke records across the United Kingdom as the highest-grossing artist at each UK venue where she performed.

== Broadcasts and recordings ==
Dion's team recorded two shows in Paris (8 and 9 July) as well as two shows in London (29 and 30 July). However, there has been no confirmation regarding a possible CD/DVD release. On 26 January 2018, a recording of "Encore un soir" was broadcast on TF1 as part of "Jean-Jacques Goldman, 40 years in music".

== Tour dates ==
List of concerts
Date (2017)	City	Country	Venue	Opening act	Attendance	Revenue
15 June	Copenhagen	Denmark	Royal Arena	Véronic DiCaire	13,269 / 13,269	$2,577,612
17 June	Stockholm	Sweden	Tele2 Arena	Véronic DiCaire	21,699 / 21,699	$2,544,591
20 June	London	England	The O_{2} Arena	Véronic DiCaire	28,976 / 28,976	$4,135,146
21 June	London	England	The O_{2} Arena	Véronic DiCaire	28,976 / 28,976	$4,135,146
23 June	Arnhem	Netherlands	GelreDome	Véronic DiCaire	26,406 / 26,406	$3,039,276
25 June (Note: The concert on 25 June 2017 at First Direct Arena in Leeds was originally scheduled to take place at the Manchester Arena in Manchester.)	Leeds	England	First Direct Arena	Véronic DiCaire	7,205 / 7,205	$1,124,798
29 June	Bordeaux	France	Matmut Atlantique	Véronic DiCaire	31,140 / 31,140	$3,505,145
1 July	Villeneuve-d'Ascq (Note: Promoted as Lille)	France	Stade Pierre-Mauroy	Véronic DiCaire	51,355 / 51,355	$5,869,005
2 July	Villeneuve-d'Ascq	France	Stade Pierre-Mauroy	Véronic DiCaire	51,355 / 51,355	$5,869,005
4 July	Paris	France	AccorHotels Arena	Véronic DiCaire	48,226 / 48,226	$7,918,424
5 July	Paris	France	AccorHotels Arena	Véronic DiCaire	48,226 / 48,226	$7,918,424
8 July	Paris	France	AccorHotels Arena	Véronic DiCaire	48,226 / 48,226	$7,918,424
9 July	Paris	France	AccorHotels Arena	Véronic DiCaire	48,226 / 48,226	$7,918,424
12 July	Décines (Note: Promoted as Lyon)	France	Groupama Stadium	Véronic DiCaire	39,507 / 39,507	$4,645,895
15 July	Bern	Switzerland	Stade de Suisse	Véronic DiCaire	23,143 / 23,143	$4,728,650
18 July	Marseille	France	Orange Vélodrome	Véronic DiCaire	43,128 / 43,128	$5,095,778
20 July	Nice	France	Allianz Riviera	Véronic DiCaire	30,270 / 30,270	$3,648,103
23 July	Berlin	Germany	Mercedes-Benz Arena	Véronic DiCaire	20,391 / 20,391	$3,338,229
24 July	Berlin	Germany	Mercedes-Benz Arena	Véronic DiCaire	20,391 / 20,391	$3,338,229
27 July	Birmingham	England	Barclaycard Arena	Véronic DiCaire	12,275 / 12,275	$1,916,987
29 July	London	England	The O2 Arena	Véronic DiCaire	29,352 / 29,352	$4,305,399
30 July	London	England	The O2 Arena	Véronic DiCaire	29,352 / 29,352	$4,305,399
2 August (Note: The concert on 2 August 2017 at First Direct Arena in Leeds was originally scheduled to take place at Manchester Arena in Manchester on 1 August 2017.)	Leeds	England	First Direct Arena	Véronic DiCaire	8,897 / 8,897	$1,448,536
3 August	Birmingham	England	Barclaycard Arena	Véronic DiCaire	11,590 / 11,590	$1,770,707
5 August	Glasgow	Scotland	SSE Hydro	Véronic DiCaire	11,094 / 11,094	$1,723,094
Total					457,923 / 457,923	$63,335,375

== Band ==
- Scott Price – musical director, piano
- Dominique Messier – drums
- Yves Labonté – bass
- Kaven Girouard – guitars
- Guillaume Marchand – keyboards
- Paul Picard – percussion
- Élise Duguay – background vocals, tin whistle, cello
- Barnev Valsaint – background vocals
- Dawn Cumberbatch – background vocals
- Philippe Dunnigan – violin
- Jenny Elfving – violin
- Laraine Kaizer – violin
- Rebecca Ramsey – violin
- Svetlin Belneev – violin
- Lisa Dondlinger – violin
- Lenka Hajkova – violin
- John Arnold – violin
- De Ann Letourneau – violin
- Jerome Gordon – viola
- Kaila Potts – viola
- Dmitri Kourka – viola
- Lindsey Springer – cello
- Raymond Sicam III – cello
- Irina Chirkova – cello
- Judy Kang – cello
- Eric Tewalt – woodwinds
- Philip Wigfall – woodwinds
- Matt Fronke – trumpet
- Kurt Evanson – trumpet
- Nico Edgerman – trumpet
- Don Lorice – trumpet
- Daniel Falcone – trombone
- Nathan Tanouye – trombone

== See also ==
- List of highest-grossing concert tours by women
