= List of best-selling singles in the United Kingdom =

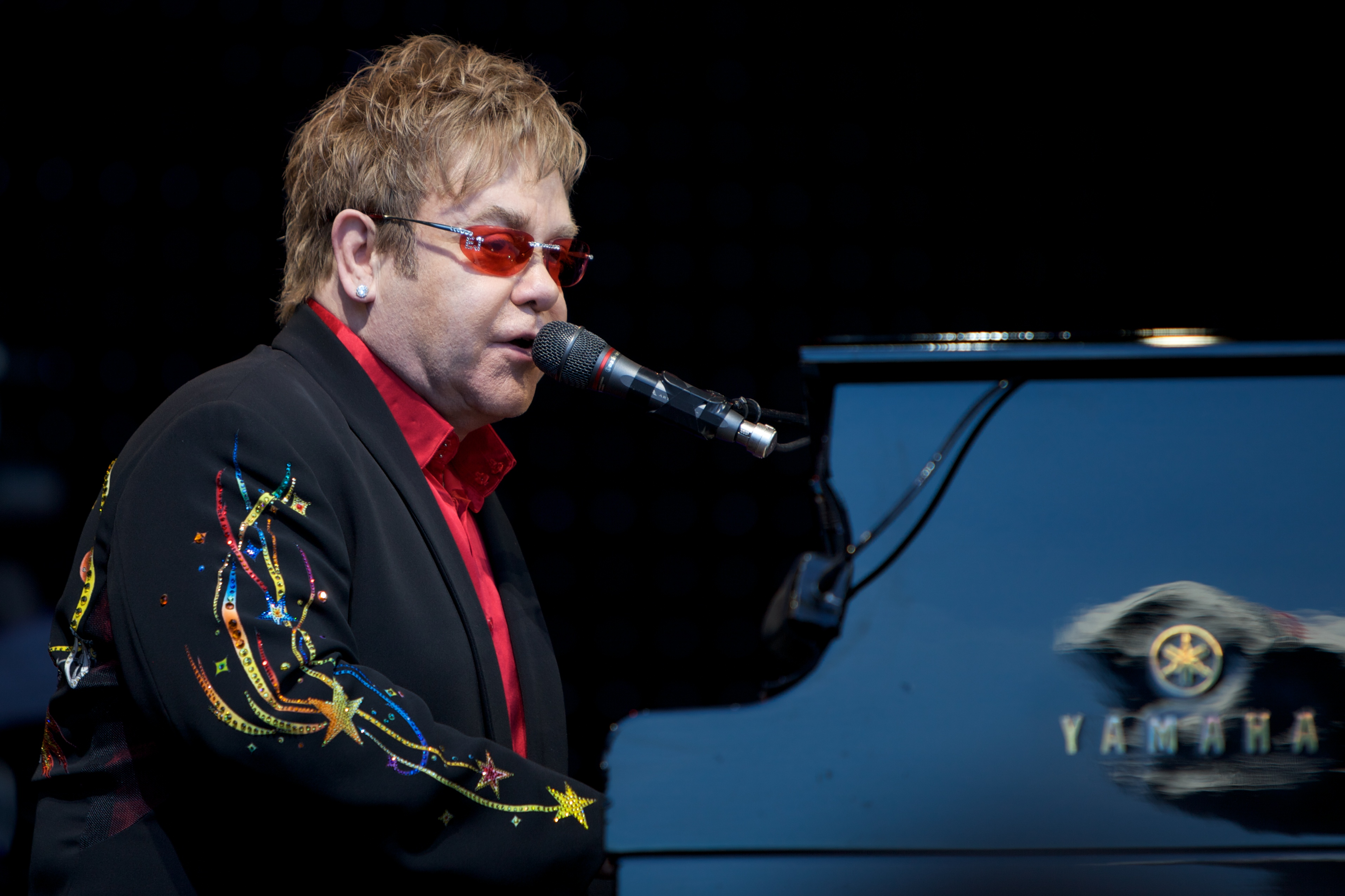
"Candle in the Wind 1997" / "Something About the Way You Look Tonight" by Elton John is the best-selling single in the UK.

For the purposes of calculating sales, a single is currently defined by the Official Charts Company (OCC) as either a "single bundle" having no more than four tracks and not lasting longer than 25 minutes or one digital audio track not longer than 15 minutes with a minimum sale price of 40 pence. The rules have changed many times as technology has developed, the most notable being the inclusion of digital downloads in 2004 and streaming in 2014.

The best-selling single in the UK is "Something About the Way You Look Tonight"/"Candle in the Wind 1997", a double A-side released by Elton John following the death of Diana, Princess of Wales. Since September 1997, the single has sold over 5.4 million copies in the UK.

Sales of singles have been monitored and charted in the UK since 1952, when Percy Dickins of New Musical Express (NME) telephoned around 20 record stores and aggregated their best-selling singles into a hit parade. Dickins published this Top 12 chart in NME on 14 November 1952.

The highest-selling single by a solo female artist is "All I Want for Christmas Is You" by Mariah Carey. Released in October 1994, it has combined sales of over 4 million in the UK.

The best-selling single not to top the UK Singles Chart is "Mr. Brightside" by The Killers, which reached number 10 in 2004. When streaming is taken into account, "All of Me" by John Legend, which has over 2.1 million combined sales, is the highest-selling single not to have topped the charts.

The highest-selling single (paid-for purchases) in the 21st century is "Happy" by Pharrell Williams, which has sold 1.93 million; it overtook "Anything Is Possible" / "Evergreen" by Will Young in 2015.

The most streamed song is "Shape of You" by Ed Sheeran with over 200 million streams (2 million equivalent sales) from 2017. Twenty other songs have been streamed over 100 million times, including two more by Ed Sheeran.

== Best-selling singles based on paid-for purchases ==
Until June 2014, only a paid download or a purchase of a physical single counted as a sale. Based on this definition, these are the 50 best-selling singles in the UK. Positions are current as of 8 November 2023.

No.	Single	Artist	Record label (Note: The record labels, dates and chart peaks are those given by the OCC.)	Released	Chart peak	Traditional sales (Note: The sales are those given by the OCC as of 19 September 2017, unless stated.)
1	"Something About the Way You Look Tonight" / "Candle in the Wind 1997"	Elton John	Rocket	September 1997	1	4,940,000
2	"Do They Know It's Christmas?"	Band Aid	Mercury	November 1984	1	3,830,000
3	"Bohemian Rhapsody" / "These Are the Days of Our Lives"	Queen	EMI	October 1975; November 1991	1	2,630,000
4	"Mull of Kintyre" / "Girls' School"	Wings	Capitol	November 1977	1	2,100,000
5	"You're the One That I Want"	John Travolta and Olivia Newton-John	RSO	May 1978	1	2,080,000
6	"Relax"	Frankie Goes to Hollywood	ZTT	January 1984	1	2,066,230
7	"Rivers of Babylon" / "Brown Girl in the Ring"	Boney M.	Atlantic/Hansa	April 1978	1	2,032,656
8	"Last Christmas" / "Everything She Wants"	Wham!	Epic	December 1984	1	1,931,000
9	"Happy"	Pharrell Williams	Columbia	November 2013	1	1,930,000
10	"She Loves You"	The Beatles	Parlophone	August 1963	1	1,930,000
11	"Love Is All Around"	Wet Wet Wet	PolyGram	May 1994	1	1,898,790
12	"Mary's Boy Child – Oh My Lord"	Boney M.	Atlantic/Hansa	November 1978	1	1,885,274
13	"I Just Called to Say I Love You"	Stevie Wonder	Motown	August 1984	1	1,874,225
14	"(Everything I Do) I Do It for You"	Bryan Adams	A&M	June 1991	1	
15	"Unchained Melody" / "White Cliffs of Dover"	Robson & Jerome	RCA	May 1995	1	1,867,755
16	"Barbie Girl"	Aqua	Universal	October 1997	1	1,844,310
17	"Believe"	Cher	WEA	October 1998	1	1,826,573
18	"I Want to Hold Your Hand"	The Beatles	Parlophone	November 1963	1	1,810,829
19	"Anything Is Possible" / "Evergreen"	Will Young	S	February 2002	1	1,795,213
20	"Imagine"	John Lennon	Apple	October 1975	1	1,714,351
21	"Eye of the Tiger"	Survivor	Scotti Brothers	July 1982	1	1,650,293
22	"Uptown Funk"	Mark Ronson featuring Bruno Mars	RCA	December 2014	1	1,647,310
23	"I'll Be Missing You"	Puff Daddy and Faith Evans featuring 112	Bad Boy	June 1997	1	
24	"Blurred Lines"	Robin Thicke featuring T.I. and Pharrell Williams	Interscope	May 2013	1	1,667,165
25	"Someone like You"	Adele	XL	January 2011	1	1,644,597
26	"Three Lions" "3 Lions '98"	Baddiel, Skinner and the Lightning Seeds	Epic	June 1996	1	
27	"I Will Always Love You"	Whitney Houston	Arista	October 1992	1	1,642,360
28	"Don't You Want Me"	The Human League	Virgin	November 1981	1	
29	"Summer Nights"	John Travolta and Olivia Newton-John	RSO	September 1978	1	1,640,672
30	"Two Tribes"	Frankie Goes to Hollywood	ZTT	May 1984	1	1,629,287
31	"Gangsta's Paradise"	Coolio featuring L.V.	Tommy Boy	October 1995	1	1,585,504
32	"My Heart Will Go On"	Celine Dion	Epic	February 1998	1	1,583,276
33	"...Baby One More Time"	Britney Spears	Jive	February 1999	1	1,570,000
34	"Wonderwall"	Oasis	Creation	October 1995	2	
35	"Moves like Jagger"	Maroon 5 featuring Christina Aguilera	A&M/Octone	August 2011	2	
36	"Careless Whisper"	George Michael	Epic	July 1984	1	
37	"Can't Buy Me Love"	The Beatles	Parlophone	March 1964	1	
38	"Perfect Day"	Various artists	Chrysalis	November 1997	1	1,550,017
39	"Karma Chameleon"	Culture Club	Virgin	September 1983	1	1,528,498
40	"Somebody That I Used to Know"	Gotye featuring Kimbra	Island	January 2012	1	
41	"Y.M.C.A."	Village People	Mercury	November 1978	1	
42	"Wake Me Up"	Avicii	Positiva/PRMD	June 2013	1	
43	"Tears"	Ken Dodd	Columbia	August 1965	1	1,523,690
44	"I Gotta Feeling"	The Black Eyed Peas	Interscope	September 2009	1	1,477,778
45	"Get Lucky"	Daft Punk featuring Pharrell Williams	Columbia	April 2013	1	1,471,356
46	"Killing Me Softly"	Fugees	Columbia	June 1996	1	1,457,641
47	"The Power of Love"	Jennifer Rush	CBS	May 1985	1	1,456,087
48	"Come On Eileen"	Dexys Midnight Runners	Mercury Records	June 1982	1	
49	"It Wasn't Me"	Shaggy featuring RikRok	MCA	February 2001	1	
50	"Rock Around the Clock"	Bill Haley & His Comets	Brunswick	December 1954	1	1,439,196

== Best-selling songs based on certifications ==
Highest-certified songs in the UK
No.	Song	Artist	Released	Chart peak	Sales	No. of times Platinum
1	"Mr. Brightside"	The Killers	2003	10	7.2 million+	12×
2	"Shape of You"	Ed Sheeran	2017	1	6.6 million+	11×
3	"Someone You Loved"	Lewis Capaldi	2018	1	6.6 million+	11×
4	"Perfect"	Ed Sheeran	2017	1	6 million+	10×
5	"All I Want for Christmas Is You"	Mariah Carey	1994	2	6 million+	10×
6	"Something About the Way You Look Tonight" / "Candle in the Wind 1997"	Elton John	1997	1	5.4 million+	9×
7	"Last Christmas" / "Everything She Wants"	Wham!	1984	1	5.4 million+	9×
8	"Wonderwall"	Oasis	1995	2	5.4 million+	9×
9	"Thinking Out Loud"	Ed Sheeran	2014	1	4.8 million+	8×
10	"Blinding Lights"	The Weeknd	2019	1	4.8 million+	8×
11	"One Dance"	Drake featuring Wizkid and Kyla	2016	1	4.8 million+	8×
12	"Shotgun"	George Ezra	2018	1	4.8 million+	8×
13	"Take Me to Church"	Hozier	2013	2	4.8 million+	8×
14	"Riptide"	Vance Joy	2013	10	4.8 million+	8×
15	"Someone Like You"	Adele	2011	1	4.8 million+	8×
16	"Iris"	Goo Goo Dolls	1998	3	4.8 million+	8×
17	"Uptown Funk"	Mark Ronson featuring Bruno Mars	2014	1	4.8 million+	8×
18	"Sex on Fire"	Kings of Leon	2008	1	4.8 million+	8×
19	"Despacito" (Remix)	Luis Fonsi featuring Daddy Yankee and Justin Bieber	2017	1	4.2 million+	7×
20	"All of Me"	John Legend	2014	2	4.2 million+	7×
21	"Dance Monkey"	Tones and I	2019	1	4.2 million+	7×
22	"Castle on the Hill"	Ed Sheeran	2017	2	4.2 million+	7×
23	"Say You Won't Let Go"	James Arthur	2016	1	4.2 million+	7×
24	"Pompeii"	Bastille	2013	2	4.2 million+	7×
25	"Don't Stop Believin'"	Journey	1981	6	4.2 million+	7×
26	"Bad Habits"	Ed Sheeran	2021	1	4.2 million+	7×
27	"Fairytale of New York"	The Pogues featuring Kirsty MacColl	1987	2	4.2 million+	7×
28	"Wake Me Up"	Avicii	2013	1	4.2 million+	7×
29	"Don't Look Back in Anger"	Oasis	1996	1	4.2 million+	7×
30	"Viva la Vida"	Coldplay	2008	1	4.2 million+	7×
31	"Chasing Cars"	Snow Patrol	2006	6	4.2 million+	7×
32	"Everywhere"	Fleetwood Mac	1987	4	4.2 million+	7×
33	"Dreams"	Fleetwood Mac	1977	18	4.2 million+	7×
34	"Shut Up and Dance"	Walk the Moon	2014	4	4.2 million+	7×
35	"Let Her Go"	Passenger	2012	2	4.2 million+	7×
36	"Budapest"	George Ezra	2013	3	4.2 million+	7×
37	"Happy"	Pharrell Williams	2013	1	4.2 million+	7×
38	"Do I Wanna Know?"	Arctic Monkeys	2013	11	4.2 million+	7×
39	"Unforgettable"	French Montana featuring Swae Lee	2017	2	4.2 million+	7×

== See also ==
- List of million-selling singles in the United Kingdom
- List of most-downloaded songs in the United Kingdom
- List of most-streamed songs in the United Kingdom
- List of Platinum singles in the United Kingdom awarded before 2000
- List of Platinum singles in the United Kingdom awarded since 2000
