= List of million-selling singles in the United Kingdom =

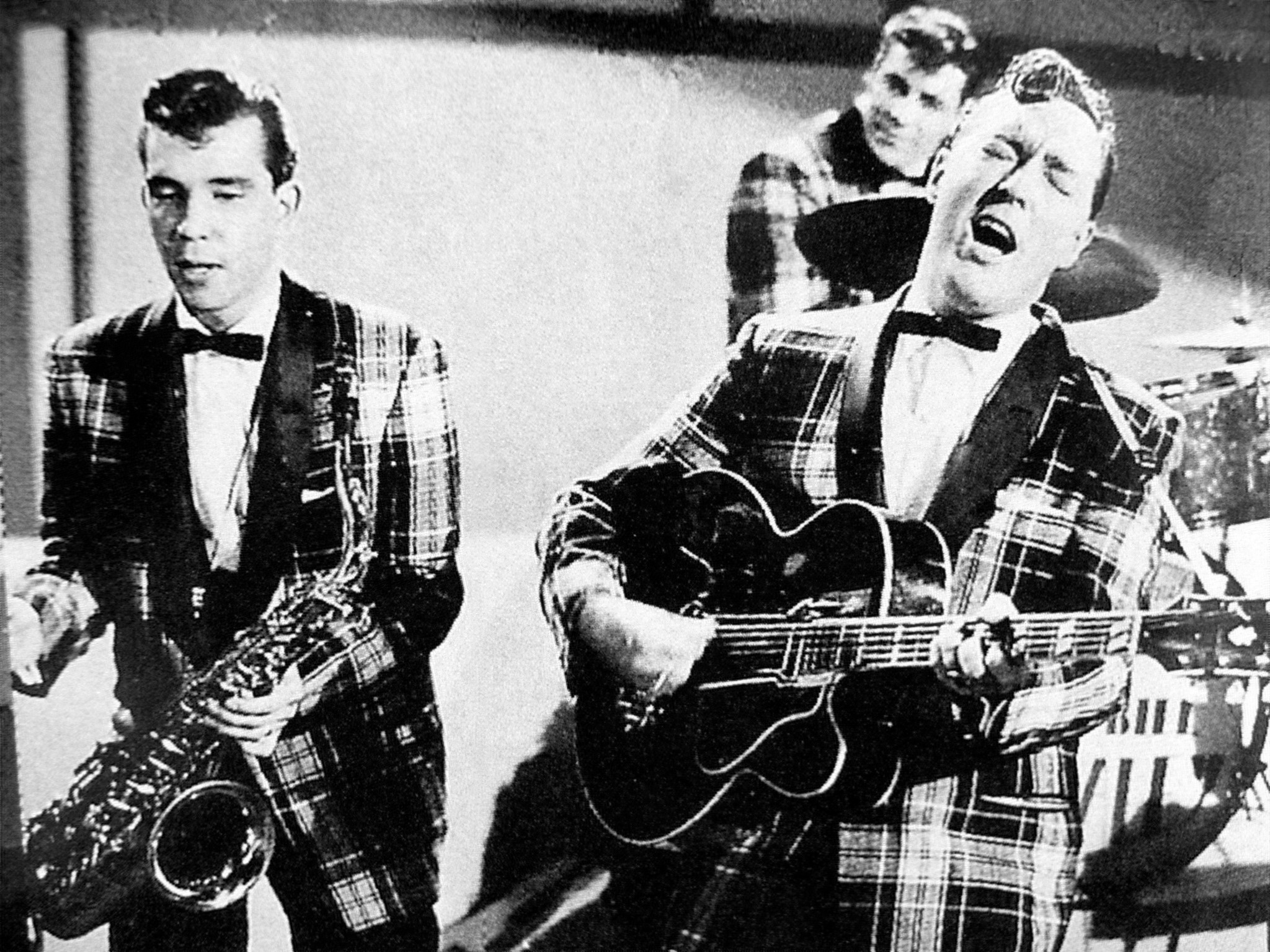
"(We're Gonna) Rock Around the Clock" by Bill Haley & His Comets was the first single to sell 1 million copies in the UK.

The definition of a million-selling single, as regarded by the Official Charts Company (OCC), has changed in line with new technology for music consumption. Originally only physical record sales were counted since the start of the UK Singles Chart in November 1952. Digital downloads of a track were included from 2004 onwards and from 2014 onwards BPI-certified awards (Silver, Gold and Platinum) and the weekly charts include audio streaming. In 2017, the OCC included streaming in their definition of a million-seller and published a full list of the 311 songs which had achieved this. Certified awards can also include shipments (sales to trade). The OCC and Music Week regularly announce when a record becomes a million seller.

== History ==
Prior to the formation of the British Phonographic Industry in 1973, the only way to know if a record had sold a million copies in the United Kingdom was if the record company alerted the press. In addition, in many cases the record company would present the artist or group with Gold Records to commemorate the million sales. However, there was some controversy over whether certain singles had actually reached sales of one million copies in the United Kingdom.

In April 1973, the British Phonographic Industry (BPI) began classifying singles and albums by the number of units sold to dealers. The highest threshold is "Platinum record" and was then awarded to singles that sold more than 1 million units. For singles released after 1 January 1989, the number of sales required to qualify for Platinum, Gold and Silver records was dropped to 600,000 units (Platinum), 400,000 units (Gold) and 200,000 units (Silver). In February 1987, the BPI introduced multi-Platinum awards so that if a single sold 1,200,000 units it was classified as double Platinum, 1,800,000 units as triple Platinum, etc.

Digital downloads have been counted towards singles sales from 2004 onwards: the first single to achieve a million digital sales was "I Gotta Feeling" by the Black Eyed Peas. Additionally, audio streaming has been included in the official chart and BPI awards since 30 June 2014, at a rate of 100 streams representing one unit sale; however, the OCC still compiles a 'sales' (only) chart.

In 1963, the Beatles' song "She Loves You" became the best-selling single of all time in the UK. This record was broken in 1977 when Paul McCartney's subsequent band Wings surpassed it with "Mull of Kintyre", which also became the first song to sell 2 million copies in the UK. In 1984, Band Aid released the charity-record "Do They Know It's Christmas?" in response to the famine in Ethiopia; it sold 1 million copies in the first week and soon became the best-selling single. This record was broken in 1997, following the death of Diana, Princess of Wales, when Elton John released "Candle in the Wind 1997", a re-write of the Marilyn Monroe tribute released in 1973. Selling more than 650,000 copies on its first day on sale and more than 1.5 million in its first week, it quickly became the UK's best-selling single. It was classified by the BPI as 9× Platinum (5.4 million) in October 1997, but more recent reports by the OCC put its total sales at 4.93 million.

== Million-selling singles (paid-for sales) ==
The following list is restricted to paid-for sales since the inception of a UK chart in 1952. Unless stated otherwise, sales figures from the OCC are correct as of 19 September 2017. At this date, the OCC started recording million-sellers using combined sales (including streaming), but published the paid-for sales figures as well.

As of November 2023, 180 singles have sold 1 million copies in the UK. Of these, 112 were originally released in the 20th century (70 of them selling 1 million before the year 2000) and the remainder were released between 2000 and 2014. The most recently released single to become a million-seller is "Uptown Funk" by Mark Ronson featuring Bruno Mars, which was released in December 2014 and passed a million sales ten weeks later in February 2015. Bing Crosby's "White Christmas" is the earliest release: originally 1942, although only sales from 1952 onwards are counted. The year in which the most million-sellers were released is 2011, with fifteen; while a record 40 releases in the 2010s have sold a million copies.

Artist	Single (two songs separated by / denotes a double A-side)	Date released (Note: Unless explicitly cited, the release dates are given by the BPI.)	Date certified Platinum	Date sold 1 million (Note: General reference, except where explicitly cited)	Copies sold (Note: Sales figures given by the OCC - these do not include streaming)	Order in which songs reached 1 million
Bing Crosby	"White Christmas"	1942	—N/a	2010–12	1,047,349	117
Bill Haley & His Comets	"(We're Gonna) Rock Around the Clock"	December 1954	—N/a	1955	1,439,196	1
Paul Anka	"Diana"	August 1957	—N/a	1957	1,253,486	
Harry Belafonte	"Mary's Boy Child"	October 1957	—N/a	1957	1,187,752	
Elvis Presley^{with The Jordanaires}	"It's Now or Never"	October 1960	—N/a	1960	1,272,271	
Acker Bilk	"Stranger on the Shore"	November 1961	—N/a	1961	1,186,534	
Cliff Richard and The Shadows	"The Young Ones"	January 1962	—N/a	1962	1,068,368	
Frank Ifield	"I Remember You"	June 1962	—N/a	1962	1,106,190	
The Beatles	"She Loves You"	August 1963	—N/a	1963	1,930,000	
Gerry and the Pacemakers	"You'll Never Walk Alone"	October 1963	—N/a	2016	1,011,244	165
The Beatles	"I Want to Hold Your Hand"	November 1963	—N/a	1963	1,810,829	
The Beatles	"Can't Buy Me Love"	March 1964	—N/a	1964	1,547,454	
The Beatles	"I Feel Fine"	November 1964	—N/a	1964	1,423,196	
The Righteous Brothers	"Unchained Melody"	July 1965; October 1990 (re-issue)	1 November 1990	2004–10	1,101,570	
Ken Dodd	"Tears"	August 1965	—N/a	1965	1,523,690	
The Seekers	"The Carnival Is Over"	October 1965	—N/a	1965	1,426,218	
The Beatles	"Day Tripper" / "We Can Work It Out"	December 1965	—N/a	1965	1,402,308	
Tom Jones	"Green, Green Grass of Home"	November 1966	—N/a	1966	1,257,737	
Engelbert Humperdinck	"Release Me"	January 1967	—N/a	1967	1,384,673	
Engelbert Humperdinck	"The Last Waltz"	August 1967	—N/a	1967	1,184,163	
The Beatles	"Hey Jude"	August 1968	—N/a	2010–12	1,141,635	116
Frank Sinatra	"My Way"	March 1969	N/A	2018	1,000,000	176–177
The Archies	"Sugar, Sugar"	October 1969	—N/a		1,040,461	
The New Seekers	"I'd Like to Teach the World to Sing (In Perfect Harmony)"	December 1971	—N/a	2004–10	1,016,440	
Simon Park Orchestra	"Eye Level"	November 1972	1 January 1978	1978	1,008,481	
Little Jimmy Osmond	"Long Haired Lover from Liverpool"	November 1972	—N/a	2004–10	1,006,661	
Tony Orlando and Dawn	"Tie a Yellow Ribbon Round the Ole Oak Tree"	February 1973	—N/a	2010–12	1,011,658	118
Gary Glitter	"I Love You Love Me Love"	November 1973	1 January 1974	1973	1,146,051	
Slade	"Merry Xmas Everybody"	December 1973	1 December 1980	1980	1,306,566	
Rod Stewart	"Sailing"	September 1975	—N/a (Note: The record was classified "Gold" (500,000) prior to 1989. Not classified Platinum when the threshold was reduced to 600,000 in 1989, as record was released under the old thresholds.)	2010–12	1,064,038	120
Queen	"Bohemian Rhapsody" "Bohemian Rhapsody" / "These Are the Days of Our Lives"	October 1975; November 1991	1 January 1976; 1 December 1991 Multi-Platinum: 2×: 29 March 2019	1975 (Note: "Bohemian Rhapsody" has sold 1 million copies and been certified Platinum both in its original 1975 release and in its 1991 re-release as a double 'A' side following the death of Freddie Mercury.)	2,630,000	
John Lennon	"Imagine"	October 1975	1 February 1981	1981	1,714,351	
Showaddywaddy	"Under the Moon of Love"	November 1976	—N/a	2010–12	1,014,475	121
Brotherhood of Man	"Save Your Kisses for Me"	March 1976	1 May 1976	1976	1,025,364	
Elton John and Kiki Dee	"Don't Go Breaking My Heart"	June 1976	—N/a	2013	1,029,242	134
ABBA	"Dancing Queen"	August 1976	21 June 2019	2004–10	1,133,288	
Julie Covington	"Don't Cry for Me Argentina"	November 1976	—N/a	2004–10	1,032,296	
David Soul	"Don't Give Up on Us"	December 1976	1 February 1977	1976	1,167,371	
Donna Summer	"I Feel Love"	July 1977	—N/a	2012	1,127,511	115
Wings	"Mull of Kintyre" / "Girls' School"	November 1977	1 December 1977 Multi-Platinum: 2×: 1 November 1986	1978	2,100,000	
Boney M.	"Rivers of Babylon" / "Brown Girl in the Ring"†	April 1978	1 May 1978	1978	2,032,656	
John Travolta and Olivia Newton-John	"You're the One That I Want"	May 1978	1 July 1978	1978	2,080,000	
John Travolta and Olivia Newton-John	"Summer Nights"	September 1978	1 October 1978	1979	1,640,672	
Gloria Gaynor	"I Will Survive"	October 1978	—N/a	2010–12	1,082,038	119
Boney M.	"Mary's Boy Child – Oh My Lord"	November 1978	1 December 1978	1978	1,885,274	
Village People	"Y.M.C.A."	November 1978	1 January 1979	1979	1,513,677	
Ian Dury and the Blockheads	"Hit Me with Your Rhythm Stick"	November 1978	—N/a	2004–10	1,129,369	
Blondie	"Heart of Glass	January 1979	1 February 1979	1979	1,322,316	
Art Garfunkel	"Bright Eyes"	January 1979	1 May 1979	1979	1,222,230	
Pink Floyd	"Another Brick in the Wall (Part II)"	November 1979	1 January 1980	2004–10	1,146,548	
Adam and the Ants	"Stand and Deliver"	May 1981	—N/a	2004–10	1,060,856	
Soft Cell	"Tainted Love"	July 1981	5 July 2019	1981	1,356,094	
The Human League	"Don't You Want Me"	November 1981	1 January 1982	1982	1,637,503	
Journey	"Don't Stop Believin'"	December 1981	22 July 2013 Multi-Platinum: 2×: 22 July 2016; 3×: 21 June 2019; 4×: 30 April 2021; 5×: 31 March 2023; 6×: 6 September 2024; 7×: 31 October 2025	2014	1,105,177	151
Tight Fit	"The Lion Sleeps Tonight"	January 1982	—N/a	2010–12	1,045,051	122
Dexy's Midnight Runners and the Emerald Express	"Come On Eileen"	June 1982	1 September 1982	1982	1,425,474	
Irene Cara	"Fame"	June 1982	—N/a	2004–10	1,079,222	
Survivor	"Eye of the Tiger"	July 1982	1 December 2014 Multi-Platinum: 2×: 6 September 2019	2004–10	1,650,293	
New Order	"Blue Monday"	March 1983	7 June 2019	2005	1,239,137	
UB40	"Red Red Wine"	August 1983	23 November 2018	2014	1,063,106	150
Culture Club	"Karma Chameleon"	September 1983	1 October 1983	1983	1,528,498	
Billy Joel	"Uptown Girl"	September 1983	—N/a	2004–10	1,066,141	
Frankie Goes to Hollywood	"Relax"	October 1983	1 March 1984	1984	2,066,230	
Frankie Goes to Hollywood	"Two Tribes"	June 1984	1 June 1984	1984	1,629,287	
George Michael	"Careless Whisper"	July 1984	1 September 1984	1984	1,523,852	
Stevie Wonder	"I Just Called to Say I Love You"	August 1984	1 September 1984	1984	1,874,225	
Ray Parker, Jr.	"Ghostbusters"	August 1984	—N/a	2004–10	1,170,587	
Band Aid	"Do They Know It's Christmas?"	November 1984	1 December 1984	1984	3,830,000	
Wham!	"Last Christmas" / "Everything She Wants"	December 1984	1 January 1985 Multi-Platinum: 2×: 28 December 2018	1985	1,825,115	
Jennifer Rush	"The Power of Love"	May 1985	1 November 1985	1985	1,456,087	
Rick Astley	"Never Gonna Give You Up"	July 1987	3 April 2020	2018	1,002,000	172–175
The Pogues^{featuring Kirsty MacColl}	"Fairytale of New York"	December 1987	22 July 2013 Multi-Platinum: 2×: 23 December 2016; 3×: 20 September 2019	2012	1,217,112	126
Kylie Minogue and Jason Donovan	"Especially for You"	November 1988	—N/a	2014	1,008,057	154
Black Box	"Ride on Time"	August 1989	1 October 1989	2004–10	1,092,718	
Bryan Adams	"(Everything I Do) I Do It for You"	June 1991	1 August 1991 Multi-Platinum: 2×: 1 September 1991	1991	1,848,154	
Whitney Houston	"I Will Always Love You"	October 1992	1 December 1992 Multi-Platinum: 2×: 1 January 1993	1993	1,642,360	
Wet Wet Wet	"Love Is All Around"	May 1994	1 June 1994 Multi-Platinum: 2×: 1 August 1994	1994	1,898,790	
Whigfield	"Saturday Night"	September 1994	1 September 1994	1994	1,193,115	
Celine Dion	"Think Twice"	October 1994	1 January 1995	1994	1,374,888	
Mariah Carey	"All I Want for Christmas Is You"	December 1994	19 December 2013 Multi-Platinum: 2×: 11 December 2015; 3×: 28 September 2018; 4×: 13 December 2019	2013	1,172,436	142
Robson Green & Jerome Flynn	"Unchained Melody" / "White Cliffs of Dover"	May 1995	May 1995 Multi-Platinum: 2×: May 1995	1995	1,867,755	
Take That	"Back for Good"	March 1995	1 April 1995	2004–10	1,119,470	
Peter Andre^{featuring Bubbler Ranx}	"Mysterious Girl"	September 1995	1 August 1996	2013	1,040,672	135
Coolio^{featuring L.V.}	"Gangsta's Paradise"	October 1995	1 November 1995 Multi-Platinum: 2×: 2 May 2014; 3×: 6 December 2019	1995	1,585,504	
Robson Green & Jerome Flynn	"I Believe" / "Up on the Roof"	October 1995	1 November 1995	1995	1,121,703	
Oasis	"Wonderwall"	October 1995	1 January 1996 Multi-Platinum: 2×: 2 July 2013; 3×: 30 June 2017; 4×: 22 March 2019	2004–10	1,502,270	172–175
Michael Jackson	"Earth Song"	November 1995	1 December 1995	1995	1,210,297	
Babylon Zoo	"Spaceman"	January 1996	1 January 1996	1996	1,161,286	
Oasis	"Don't Look Back in Anger"	February 1996	1 April 1996 Multi-Platinum: 2×: 9 June 2017; 3×: 31 May 2019	2018	1,000,000	172–175
Baddiel & Skinner & The Lightning Seeds	"Three Lions" "3 Lions '98"	June 1996; June 1998	1 July 1996; 3 July 1998	1998 (Note: "Three Lions" and "3 Lions '98" were each treated as individual songs and classified Platinum by the BPI. The OCC's list of million-sellers grouped them as the same song, thus making it a million-seller.)	1,577,260	
Fugees	"Killing Me Softly	June 1996	1 June 1996 Multi-Platinum: 2×: 1 August 1996	1996	1,457,641	
Spice Girls	"Wannabe"	July 1996	1 August 1996 Multi-Platinum: 2×: 22 July 2013; 3×: 15 November 2019	1996	1,385,211	
Spice Girls	"2 Become 1"	December 1996	1 December 1996 Multi-Platinum: 2×: 2 March 2018	1996	1,137,775	
No Doubt	"Don't Speak"	February 1997	22 July 2013 Multi-Platinum: 2×: 28 September 2018	2015	1,017,532	163
Puff Daddy and Faith Evans^{featuring 112}	"I'll Be Missing You"	June 1997	1 July 1997 Multi-Platinum: 2×: 1 August 1997; 3×: 23 February 2018	1997	1,663,303	
Elton John	"Candle in the Wind 1997" / "Something About the Way You Look Tonight"	September 1997	1 September 1997 Multi-Platinum: 2×: 1 September 1997; 3×: 1 September 1997; 4×: 1 September 1997; 5×: 1 September 1997; 6×: 1 September 1997; 7×: 1 October 1997; 8×: 1 October 1997; 9×: 1 October 1997	1997	4,940,001	
Aqua	"Barbie Girl"	October 1997	7 November 1997 Multi-Platinum: 2×: 5 December 1997; 3×: 22 July 2013	1997	1,844,310	
Natalie Imbruglia	"Torn"	October 1997	12 December 1997 Multi-Platinum: 2×: 25 September 2015	2004–10	1,197,721	
Various artists	"Perfect Day"	November 1997	21 November 1997 Multi-Platinum: 2×: 9 January 1998	1997	1,550,017	
All Saints	"Never Ever"	November 1997	5 December 1997 Multi-Platinum: 2×: 30 January 1998	1998	1,363,504	
Teletubbies	"Teletubbies say "Eh-oh!""	December 1997	12 December 1997 Multi-Platinum: 2×: 19 December 1997	1997	1,110,708	
Robbie Williams	"Angels"	December 1997	6 February 1998 Multi-Platinum: 2×: 4 December 1998	2009–10	1,228,319	
Celine Dion	"My Heart Will Go On"	February 1998	27 February 1998 Multi-Platinum: 2×: 24 April 1998; 3×: 24 May 2019	1998	1,583,276	
Run-DMC vs. Jason Nevins	"It's Like That"	March 1998	27 March 1998 Multi-Platinum: 2×: 22 July 2013	1998	1,322,898	
Goo Goo Dolls	"Iris"	April 1998	22 July 2013 Multi-Platinum: 2×: 19 May 2017; 3×: 1 May 2020	2020	1,030,000	178
Boyzone	"No Matter What"	August 1998	7 August 1998 Multi-Platinum: 2×: 13 July 2018	1998	1,157,952	
Aerosmith	"I Don't Want to Miss a Thing"	September 1998	22 July 2013 Multi-Platinum: 2×: 11 December 2015	2012	1,190,480	113
Cher	"Believe"	October 1998	30 October 1998 Multi-Platinum: 2×: 8 January 1999; 3×: 1 August 2014	1998	1,826,573	
Steps	"Heartbeat" / "Tragedy"	November 1998	8 January 1999	1999	1,212,288	
Britney Spears	"...Baby One More Time"	February 1999	19 February 1999 Multi-Platinum: 2×: 26 March 1999; 3×: 8 November 2019	1999	1,558,054	
Lou Bega	"Mambo No. 5 (A Little Bit of ...)"	August 1999	September 1999 Multi-Platinum: 2×: 17 August 2018	2014	1,029,722	155
Eiffel 65	"Blue (Da Ba Dee)"	September 1999	8 October 1999 Multi-Platinum: 2×: 5 May 2017	2000-02	1,130,082	
Bob the Builder	"Can We Fix It?"	December 2000	15 December 2000	2001	1,029,644	
Atomic Kitten	"Whole Again"	February 2001	2 March 2001 Multi-Platinum: 2×: 20 March 2020	2013	1,021,465	131
Shaggy^{featuring Rikrok}	"It Wasn't Me"	February 2001	2 March 2001 Multi-Platinum: 2×: 22 July 2013; 3×: 14 September 2018	2001	1,428,204	
Hear'Say	"Pure and Simple"	March 2001	30 March 2001 Multi-Platinum: 2×: 30 March 2001	2001	1,100,356	
Kylie Minogue	"Can't Get You Out of My Head"	September 2001	28 September 2001 Multi-Platinum: 2×: 28 August 2015	2002	1,195,229	
Enrique Iglesias	"Hero"	January 2002	15 March 2002 Multi-Platinum: 2×: 15 June 2018	2015	1,036,015	159
Will Young	"Anything Is Possible" / "Evergreen"	February 2002	1 March 2002 Multi-Platinum: 2×: 1 March 2002; 3×: 1 March 2002	2002	1,795,213	
Gareth Gates	"Unchained Melody"	March 2002	22 March 2002 Multi-Platinum: 2×: 22 March 2002	2002	1,345,850	
Eminem	"Lose Yourself"	December 2002	22 July 2013 Multi-Platinum: 2×: 22 April 2016; 3×: 31 August 2018	2015	1,077,213	162
The Black Eyed Peas	"Where Is the Love?"	June 2003	October 2003 Multi-Platinum: 2×: 28 July 2017	2017	1,018,056	168–170
The Killers	"Mr. Brightside"	May 2004	22 July 2013 Multi-Platinum: 2×: 27 May 2016; 3×: 3 November 2017; 4×: 1 February 2019; 5×: 27 March 2020	2018	1,010,000	176-177
Band Aid 20	"Do They Know It's Christmas?"	November 2004	17 December 2004 Multi-Platinum: 2×: 17 December 2004	2004	1,184,396	
Tony Christie^{featuring Peter Kay}	"(Is This the Way to) Amarillo"	March 2005	8 April 2005 Multi-Platinum: 2×: 22 July 2013	2005	1,354,478	
Shayne Ward	"That's My Goal"	December 2005	13 January 2006	2006	1,112,671	
Gnarls Barkley	"Crazy"	April 2006	26 May 2006 Multi-Platinum: 2×: 15 April 2016	2010–11	1,131,184	104
Snow Patrol	"Chasing Cars"	July 2006	22 July 2013 Multi-Platinum: 2×: 8 January 2016; 3×: 25 January 2019	2013	1,159,099	139
Leona Lewis	"Bleeding Love"	October 2007	18 January 2008 Multi-Platinum: 2×: 2 December 2016	2010	1,114,596	103
Take That	"Rule the World"	October 2007	22 July 2013 Multi-Platinum: 2×: 5 January 2018	2014	1,070,725	152
Kings of Leon	"Sex on Fire"	September 2008	22 July 2013 Multi-Platinum: 2×: 22 July 2013; 3×: 9 March 2018	2010	1,386,171	101
Adele	"Make You Feel My Love"	October 2008	22 April 2011 Multi-Platinum: 2×: 12 May 2017	2017	1,002,171	168–170
Kings of Leon	"Use Somebody"	December 2008	22 July 2013 Multi-Platinum: 2×: 10 June 2016	2013	1,115,392	133
Alexandra Burke	"Hallelujah"	December 2008	16 January 2009 Multi-Platinum: 2×: 22 July 2013	2009	1,310,017	
Lady Gaga	"Poker Face"	April 2009	7 January 2010 Multi-Platinum: 2×: 23 October 2015	2010	1,180,377	102
The Black Eyed Peas	"I Gotta Feeling"	July 2009	7 January 2010 Multi-Platinum: 2×: 22 July 2013; 3×: 1 March 2019	2010	1,477,778	100
Cheryl Cole	"Fight for This Love"	October 2009	14 May 2010 Multi-Platinum: 2×: 10 April 2020	2012	1,040,958	125
Lady Gaga	"Bad Romance"	October 2009	20 August 2013 Multi-Platinum: 2×: 30 March 2018	2013	1,045,372	138
Eminem^{featuring Rihanna}	"Love the Way You Lie"	July 2010	22 July 2013 Multi-Platinum: 2×: 25 July 2014; 3×: 28 December 2018	2011	1,258,763	107
CeeLo Green	"Fuck You"	August 2010	January 2011 Multi-Platinum: 2×: 25 May 2018	2017	1,002,504	168–170
Bruno Mars	"Just the Way You Are (Amazing)"	September 2010	2 August 2011 Multi-Platinum: 2×: 9 August 2013; 3×: 22 February 2019	2011	1,331,684	106
Rihanna	"Only Girl (In the World)"	October 2010	7 January 2011 Multi-Platinum: 2×: 1 January 2016	2011	1,162,460	108
Katy Perry	"Firework"	November 2010	11 March 2011 Multi-Platinum: 2×: 9 September 2016	2014	1,091,743	147
Matt Cardle	"When We Collide"	December 2010	22 July 2013	2012	1,017,149	123
Bruno Mars	"Grenade"	January 2011	22 July 2013 Multi-Platinum: 2×: 26 January 2018	2018	1,000,000	171
Adele	"Rolling in the Deep"	January 2011	24 June 2011 Multi-Platinum: 2×: 22 April 2016; 3×: 29 May 2020	2014	1,086,347	144
Adele	"Someone like You"	January 2011	1 April 2011 Multi-Platinum: 2×: 22 July 2013; 3×: 29 July 2016; 4×: 23 August 2019	2011	1,644,597	105
Jessie J^{featuring B.o.B}	"Price Tag"	January 2011	13 May 2011 Multi-Platinum: 2×: 4 July 2014	2012	1,228,371	111
LMFAO^{featuring Lauren Bennett & GoonRock}	"Party Rock Anthem"	January 2011	22 July 2013 Multi-Platinum: 2×: 22 July 2013	2012	1,284,335	110
Pitbull^{featuring Ne-Yo, Afrojack and Nayer}	"Give Me Everything"	March 2011	16 September 2011 Multi-Platinum: 2×: 16 March 2018	2014	1,048,500	146
Christina Perri	"Jar of Hearts"	May 2011	22 July 2013 Multi-Platinum: 2×: 9 March 2018	2016	1,018,874	164
Ed Sheeran	"The A Team"	June 2011	28 October 2011 Multi-Platinum: 2×: 3 July 2015; 3×: 3 August 2018	2013	1,118,825	132
LMFAO	"Sexy and I Know It"	July 2011	22 July 2013	2018	1,000,000	172–175
Maroon 5^{featuring Christina Aguilera}	"Moves like Jagger"	August 2011	22 July 2013 Multi-Platinum: 2×: 22 July 2013; 3×: 27 April 2018	2011	1,536,041	109
Coldplay	"Paradise"	September 2011	4 July 2014 Multi-Platinum: 2×: 31 March 2017	2018	1,000,000	172–175
Rihanna^{featuring Calvin Harris}	"We Found Love"	September 2011	22 July 2013 Multi-Platinum: 2×: 22 July 2013; 3×: 8 June 2018	2012	1,415,416	112
One Direction	"What Makes You Beautiful"	September 2011	15 February 2013 Multi-Platinum: 2×: 1 June 2018	2016	1,010,042	167
Gotye^{featuring Kimbra}	"Somebody That I Used to Know"	December 2011	22 July 2013 Multi-Platinum: 2×: 22 July 2013; 3×: 8 June 2018	2012	1,515,527	114
David Guetta^{featuring Sia}	"Titanium"	December 2011	10 August 2012 Multi-Platinum: 2×: 4 July 2014; 3×: 18 May 2018	2013	1,300,566	130
Nicki Minaj	"Starships"	February 2012	22 July 2013 Multi-Platinum: 2×: 27 October 2017	2016	1,162,065	166
fun.^{featuring Janelle Monáe}	"We Are Young"	April 2012	22 July 2013 Multi-Platinum: 2×: 28 August 2015	2013	1,145,195	128
Carly Rae Jepsen	"Call Me Maybe"	April 2012	22 July 2013 Multi-Platinum: 2×: 22 July 2013; 3×: 14 June 2019	2012	1,358,631	124
Passenger	"Let Her Go"	July 2012	28 June 2013 Multi-Platinum: 2×: 4 July 2014; 3×: 14 July 2017; 4×: 10 April 2020	2013	1,243,336	141
Psy	"Gangnam Style"	August 2012	22 July 2013 Multi-Platinum: 2×: 27 December 2013	2013	1,304,437	129
Rihanna	"Diamonds"	September 2012	15 February 2013 Multi-Platinum: 2×: 19 February 2016	2014	1,098,959	145
Swedish House Mafia^{featuring John Martin}	"Don't You Worry Child"	October 2012	22 July 2013 Multi-Platinum: 2×: 8 July 2016	2015	1,050,457	160
James Arthur	"Impossible"	December 2012	15 February 2013 Multi-Platinum: 2×: 22 July 2013; 3×: 27 March 2020	2013	1,310,169	127
Bastille	"Pompeii"	January 2013		2023	1,002,000	180
Daft Punk^{featuring Pharrell Williams}	"Get Lucky"	April 2013	22 July 2013 Multi-Platinum: 2×: 23 August 2013; 3×: 7 July 2017	2013	1,471,356	136
Naughty Boy^{featuring Sam Smith}	"La La La"	May 2013	22 July 2013 Multi-Platinum: 2×: 13 November 2015	2014	1,070,199	148
Robin Thicke^{featuring T.I. and Pharrell Williams}	"Blurred Lines"	May 2013	22 July 2013 Multi-Platinum: 2×: 9 August 2013; 3×: 18 December 2015	2013	1,667,615	137
OneRepublic	"Counting Stars"	June 2013	23 November 2013 Multi-Platinum: 2×: 12 December 2014; 3×: 10 August 2018	2014	1,132,526	153
Avicii	"Wake Me Up!"	July 2013	9 August 2013 Multi-Platinum: 2×: 3 January 2014; 3×: 26 August 2016; 4×: 7 June 2019	2013	1,483,346	140
John Legend	"All of Me"	August 2013	30 May 2014 Multi-Platinum: 2×: 17 October 2014; 3×: 25 March 2016; 4×: 17 August 2018	2015	1,259,708	156
Katy Perry	"Roar"	September 2013	1 November 2013 Multi-Platinum: 2×: 24 July 2015; 3×: 18 October 2019	2015	1,112,787	157
Pharrell Williams	"Happy"	November 2013	24 January 2014 Multi-Platinum: 2×: 28 March 2014; 3×: 18 July 2014; 4×: 22 April 2016; 5×: 30 August 2019	2014	1,921,805	143
Clean Bandit^{featuring Jess Glynne}	"Rather Be"	January 2014	7 March 2014 Multi-Platinum: 2×: 4 July 2014; 3×: 21 August 2015; 4×: 26 October 2018	2014	1,283,122	149
Ed Sheeran	"Thinking Out Loud"	June 2014	14 November 2014 Multi-Platinum: 2×: 30 January 2015; 3×: 18 September 2015; 4×: 12 May 2017; 5×: 1 March 2019	2015	1,219,184	161
Taylor Swift	"Shake It Off"	August 2014	28 November 2014 Multi-Platinum: 2×: 6 October 2017; 3×: 29 May 2020	2022	1,000,000	179
Mark Ronson^{featuring Bruno Mars}	"Uptown Funk"	December 2014	6 January 2015 Multi-Platinum: 2×: 13 February 2015; 3×: 22 May 2015; 4×: 10 June 2016; 5×: 21 September 2018	2015	1,647,310	158

†Although "Brown Girl in the Ring" was listed as the B-side, it received extensive airplay, which caused the single to peak in the charts for a second time.

== Artists with the most million-selling singles ==
Twenty-five artists have had at least two million-selling singles in the UK (if John Travolta and Olivia Newton-John are counted as one artist), but only six artists have had more than two: The Beatles and Whitney Houston, who have six; Rihanna, who has four (including one as a featured artist); Adele, Bruno Mars and Pharrell Williams, who all have three (including one for Mars as a featured artist and two for Williams as a featured artist).

Artist	No. of million-sellers	Songs
The Beatles	6	"She Loves You", "I Want to Hold Your Hand", "Can't Buy Me Love", "I Feel Fine", "Day Tripper" / "We Can Work It Out", "Hey Jude"
Whitney Houston	6	"I Wanna Dance with Somebody (Who Loves Me)", "I Will Always Love You", "Higher Love", Its Not Right But Its Okay, "I Have Nothing", "How Will I Know"
Rihanna	4†	"Love the Way You Lie", "Only Girl (In the World)", "We Found Love", "Diamonds"
Adele	3	"Make You Feel My Love", "Rolling in the Deep", "Someone like You"
Bruno Mars	3†	"Just the Way You Are (Amazing)", "Grenade", "Uptown Funk"
Pharrell Williams	3†	"Get Lucky", "Blurred Lines", "Happy"
Britney Spears	3	"...Baby One More Time", "Oops!... I Did It Again", "Toxic"
Boney M.	2	"Rivers of Babylon" / "Brown Girl in the Ring", "Mary's Boy Child – Oh My Lord"
The Black Eyed Peas	2	"Where Is the Love?", "I Gotta Feeling"
Celine Dion	2	"My Heart Will Go On", "Think Twice"
Ed Sheeran	2	"The A Team", "Thinking Out Loud"
Elton John	2	"Don't Go Breaking My Heart", "Candle in the Wind 1997"
Eminem	2	"Lose Yourself", "Love the Way You Lie"
Engelbert Humperdinck	2	"Release Me", "The Last Waltz"
Frankie Goes to Hollywood	2	"Relax", "Two Tribes"
John Travolta and Olivia Newton-John	2‡	"You're the One That I Want", "Summer Nights"
Katy Perry	2	"Firework", "Roar"
Kings of Leon	2	"Sex on Fire", "Use Somebody"
Kylie Minogue	2‡	"Especially for You", "Can't Get You Out of My Head"
Lady Gaga	2	"Poker Face", "Bad Romance"
LMFAO	2	"Party Rock Anthem", "Sexy and I Know It"
Oasis	2	"Wonderwall", "Don't Look Back in Anger"
Robson & Jerome	2	"I Believe" / "Up on the Roof", "Unchained Melody" / "White Cliffs of Dover"
Spice Girls	2	"Wannabe", "2 Become 1"
Take That	2	"Back for Good", "Rule the World"

- † Includes featured performances
- ‡ Duets

== Songs with one million combined sales ==
This is a list of singles which have reached a million combined sales when streaming is taken into account (100 streams equivalent to one download or physical sale). In addition to those 175 listed above, at least 137 songs have achieved one million combined sales, according to a list published by the OCC in September 2017. Nineteen of these were released before 2000 and twenty-seven in 2015. The most combined sales (and only song with over 2 million streaming equivalent sales) without a million traditional sales, is "Shape of You" by Ed Sheeran.

In the full list of 312 songs with combined sales of over a million, Rihanna features as a named artist on 10 and Sheeran features on 9.

Artist	Single	Date released (Note: Unless explicitly cited, the release dates are given by the BPI.)	Date certified Platinum	Copies sold	Streaming sales	Combined sales
The Beatles	"Help!"	July 1965	—N/a	987,769	51,019	1,038,788
Frank Sinatra	"My Way"	March 1969	—N/a	991,563	55,991	1,047,554
George Harrison	"My Sweet Lord"	January 1971	—N/a	960,561	54,578	1,015,139
Rod Stewart	"Reason to Believe" / "Maggie May"	July 1971	—N/a	928,882	99,112	1,027,994
John Lennon and Yoko Ono/Plastic Ono Band^{with the Harlem Community Choir}	"Happy Xmas (War Is Over)"	December 1971	27 December 2019	937,801	85,084	1,022,885
Stevie Wonder	"Superstition"	January 1973	26 August 2016 Multi-Platinum: 2×: 10 January 2020	460,000	650,000	1,110,000
Bee Gees	"How Deep Is Your Love"	September 1977	—N/a	963,471	52,051	1,015,522
The Jam	"Town Called Malice" / "Precious"	January 1982	23 August 2019	931,196	133,602	1,064,797
Michael Jackson	"Billie Jean"	January 1983	3 March 2017	843,050	252,869	1,095,919
David Bowie	"Let's Dance"	March 1983	—N/a	908,867	155,360	1,064,227
Lionel Richie	"Hello"	February 1984	—N/a	964,623	67,679	1,032,302
Shakin' Stevens	"Merry Christmas Everyone"	December 1985	5 January 2018	855,675	176,416	1,032,090
Starship	"Nothing's Gonna Stop Us Now"	March 1987	—N/a	957,336	103,849	1,061,185
Mark Morrison	"Return of the Mack"	March 1996	1 May 1996 Multi-Platinum: 2×: 20 September 2019	921,665	111,534	1,033,198
Will Smith	"Men in Black"	August 1997	1 August 1997	961,805	48,759	1,010,565
B*Witched	"C'est la Vie"	June 1998	1 July 1998	927,535	77,032	1,004,568
Eminem^{featuring Dido}	"Stan"	December 2000	15 December 2000 Multi-Platinum: 2×: 12 January 2018	953,053	196,492	1,149,545
Wheatus	"Teenage Dirtbag"	February 2001	22 July 2013 Multi-Platinum: 2×: 19 January 2018	924,964	234,043	1,159,007
Westlife	"Uptown Girl"	March 2001	16 March 2001	748,000	352,000	1,100,000
Nelly^{featuring Kelly Rowland}	"Dilemma"	October 2002	25 October 2002 Multi-Platinum: 2×: 11 May 2018	933,965	176,126	1,110,091
R. Kelly	"Ignition (Remix)"	May 2003	22 July 2013 Multi-Platinum: 2×: 30 June 2017	767,829	487,222	1,255,050
Kanye West^{featuring Jamie Foxx}	"Gold Digger"	August 2005	4 July 2014 Multi-Platinum: 2×: 13 July 2018	649,157	362,163	1,011,321
Coldplay	"Fix You"	September 2005	4 July 2014 Multi-Platinum: 2×: 17 August 2018	727,508	318,738	1,046,246
Shakira^{featuring Wyclef Jean}	"Hips Don't Lie"	June 2006	22 July 2013 Multi-Platinum: 2×: 6 July 2018	795,563	250,928	1,046,491
The Fray	"How to Save a Life"	January 2007	22 July 2013 Multi-Platinum: 2×: 25 May 2018	748,702	319,381	1,068,082
Rihanna^{featuring Jay-Z}	"Umbrella"	May 2007	12 December 2008 Multi-Platinum: 2×: 14 December 2018	869,597	171,399	1,040,996
Jason Mraz	"I'm Yours"	March 2008	22 July 2013 Multi-Platinum: 2×: 8 September 2017; 3×: 7 February 2020	830,946	371,728	1,202,674
Coldplay	"Viva la Vida"	April 2008	23 November 2012 Multi-Platinum: 2×: 20 October 2017	860,580	317,442	1,178,022
Beyoncé	"Halo"	February 2009	22 July 2013 Multi-Platinum: 2×: 18 May 2018	760,027	295,025	1,055,052
Owl City	"Fireflies"	January 2010	22 July 2013 Multi-Platinum: 2×: 17 May 2019	844,895	163,452	1,008,347
Tinie Tempah	"Pass Out"	March 2010	11 March 2011 Multi-Platinum: 2×: 26 October 2018	917,533	173,967	1,091,500
Jennifer Lopez^{featuring Pitbull}	"On the Floor"	March 2011	22 July 2013	919,643	90,280	1,009,923
Labrinth^{featuring Tinie Tempah}	"Earthquake"	October 2011	22 July 2013 Multi-Platinum: 2×: 9 August 2019	936,842	131,143	1,067,985
Christina Perri	"A Thousand Years"	November 2011	22 July 2013 Multi-Platinum: 2×: 26 January 2018	844,044	285,467	1,129,511
Ed Sheeran	"Lego House"	November 2011	22 July 2013 Multi-Platinum: 2×: 4 May 2018	811,534	293,051	1,104,585
Imagine Dragons	"Radioactive"	February 2012	22 July 2013 Multi-Platinum: 2×: 12 May 2017; 3×: 6 March 2020	692,497	598,387	1,290,884
The Lumineers	"Ho Hey"	March 2012	22 July 2013 Multi-Platinum: 2×: 18 August 2017	890,096	317,186	1,207,282
Rudimental^{featuring John Newman}	"Feel the Love"	May 2012	22 July 2013 Multi-Platinum: 2×: 8 December 2017	907,979	264,573	1,172,552
Maroon 5^{featuring Wiz Khalifa}	"Payphone"	June 2012	22 July 2013 Multi-Platinum: 2×: 24 May 2019	859,932	173,821	1,033,753
The Script^{featuring will.i.am}	"Hall of Fame"	August 2012	22 July 2013 Multi-Platinum: 2×: 16 March 2018	829,898	294,584	1,124,481
Macklemore & Ryan Lewis^{featuring Wanz}	"Thrift Shop"	September 2012	14 June 2013 Multi-Platinum: 2×: 4 October 2019	841,728	203,738	1,045,466
Macklemore & Ryan Lewis^{featuring Ray Dalton}	"Can't Hold Us"	October 2012	11 October 2013 Multi-Platinum: 2×: 26 January 2018; 3×: 17 January 2020	760,854	460,757	1,221,610
Bruno Mars	"Locked Out of Heaven"	November 2012	22 July 2013 Multi-Platinum: 2×: 21 September 2018	863,122	246,329	1,109,451
Labrinth^{featuring Emeli Sandé}	"Beneath Your Beautiful"	December 2012	22 July 2013 Multi-Platinum: 2×: 26 January 2018	963,449	197,914	1,161,363
Pink^{featuring Nate Ruess}	"Just Give Me a Reason"	February 2013	22 July 2013 Multi-Platinum: 2×: 31 August 2018	851,173	219,664	1,070,836
Bastille	"Pompeii"	March 2013	7 November 2013 Multi-Platinum: 2×: 7 August 2015; 3×: 5 January 2018; 4×: 17 April 2020	959,693	749,011	1,708,704
Rudimental^{featuring Ella Eyre}	"Waiting All Night"	April 2013	27 February 2015 Multi-Platinum: 2×: 1 June 2018	790,626	301,268	1,091,893
Arctic Monkeys	"Do I Wanna Know?"	June 2013	7 February 2015 Multi-Platinum: 2×: 18 May 2018	459,623	575,455	1,035,078
John Newman	"Love Me Again"	June 2013	27 December 2013 Multi-Platinum: 2×: 11 October 2019	804,466	250,831	1,055,297
Lana Del Rey vs. Cedric Gervais	"Summertime Sadness"	July 2013	4 July 2014 Multi-Platinum: 2×: 14 December 2018	652,060	364,386	1,016,446
Ellie Goulding	"Burn"	August 2013	3 January 2014 Multi-Platinum: 2×: 18 January 2019	785,459	320,272	1,105,731
Ellie Goulding	"How Long Will I Love You?"	August 2013	6 June 2014 Multi-Platinum: 2×: 20 September 2019	776,390	228,482	1,004,872
Avicii	"Hey Brother"	September 2013	23 May 2014 Multi-Platinum: 2×: 26 April 2019	711,296	314,200	1,025,496
George Ezra	"Budapest"	September 2013	10 October 2014 Multi-Platinum: 2×: 23 September 2015; 3×: 1 June 2018; 4×: 17 April 2020	761,988	866,882	1,628,870
Hozier	"Take Me to Church"	September 2013	13 February 2015 Multi-Platinum: 2×: 29 May 2015; 3×: 23 December 2016; 4×: 27 September 2019	934,466	1,017,851	1,952,317
Eminem^{featuring Rihanna}	"The Monster"	October 2013	7 March 2014 Multi-Platinum: 2×: 9 November 2018	696,280	363,633	1,059,913
Magic!	"Rude"	October 2013	17 October 2014 Multi-Platinum: 2×: 28 September 2018	596,606	506,388	1,102,994
Vance Joy	"Riptide"	November 2013	3 April 2015 Multi-Platinum: 2×: 1 December 2017; 3×: 1 November 2019	424,836	721,599	1,146,436
Idina Menzel	"Let It Go"	November 2013	2 December 2013 Multi-Platinum: 2×: 17 February 2017	817,522	442,630	1,260,153
Pitbull^{featuring Kesha}	"Timber"	December 2013	27 February 2015 Multi-Platinum: 2×: 30 January 2015	817,206	474,155	1,291,361
Mr Probz	"Waves"	February 2014	4 July 2014 Multi-Platinum: 2×: 30 January 2015; 3×: 29 June 2018	933,555	757,402	1,690,957
Route 94^{featuring Jess Glynne}	"My Love"	March 2014	4 July 2014 Multi-Platinum: 2×: 6 September 2019	594,828	407,241	1,002,069
Sia	"Chandelier"	March 2014	27 February 2015 Multi-Platinum: 2×: 15 July 2016; 3×: 19 October 2018	661,055	860,819	1,521,874
Sam Smith	"Stay with Me"	April 2014	22 August 2014 Multi-Platinum: 2×: 24 April 2015; 3×: 23 March 2018	834,622	832,637	1,667,260
Ed Sheeran	"Sing"	April 2014	20 June 2014 Multi-Platinum: 2×: 2 December 2016	671,626	667,036	1,338,662
James Bay	"Let It Go"	May 2014	5 February 2016 Multi-Platinum: 2×: 26 January 2018; 3×: 8 May 2020	338,543	972,413	1,310,956
Sam Smith	"I'm Not the Only One"	May 2014	23 January 2015 Multi-Platinum: 2×: 13 February 2018	507,375	603,131	1,110,507
Ella Henderson	"Ghost"	May 2014	20 June 2014 Multi-Platinum: 2×: 2 December 2016	860,629	533,046	1,393,675
Ed Sheeran	"Don't"	June 2014	13 February 2015 Multi-Platinum: 2×: 7 September 2018	399,001	674,153	1,073,154
Lilly Wood and Robin Schulz	"Prayer in C"	July 2014	1 January 2015	471,505	530,711	1,002,215
Jessie J, Ariana Grande and Nicki Minaj	"Bang Bang"	July 2014	30 January 2015 Multi-Platinum: 2×: 1 June 2018	554,197	544,591	1,098,788
Meghan Trainor	"All About That Bass"	August 2014	14 November 2014 Multi-Platinum: 2×: 18 December 2015	884,347	493,444	1,377,790
Maroon 5	"Sugar"	August 2014	5 June 2015 Multi-Platinum: 2×: 15 September 2017	499,025	699,682	1,198,708
Ariana Grande	"One Last Time"	August 2014	9 June 2017 Multi-Platinum: 2×: 23 February 2018	373,318	644,752	1,018,070
James Bay	"Hold Back the River"	November 2014	1 May 2015 Multi-Platinum: 2×: 13 May 2016; 3×: 27 September 2019	674,185	924,017	1,598,202
Kygo^{featuring Conrad Sewell}	"Firestone"	December 2014	18 September 2015 Multi-Platinum: 2×: 5 October 2018	368,736	700,133	1,068,869
Ellie Goulding	"Love Me Like You Do"	January 2015	8 January 2015 Multi-Platinum: 2×: 15 January 2016; 3×: 20 September 2019	823,581	677,205	1,500,786
Fetty Wap	"Trap Queen"	January 2015	23 October 2015 Multi-Platinum: 2×: 27 July 2018	316,087	779,095	1,095,181
Rihanna^{featuring Kanye West and Paul McCartney}	"FourFiveSeconds"	January 2015	8 May 2015 Multi-Platinum: 2×: 22 March 2019	521,572	478,597	1,000,169
Years & Years	"King"	January 2015	5 June 2015 Multi-Platinum: 2×: 3 February 2017	547,326	744,835	1,292,162
Skrillex and Diplo^{featuring Justin Bieber}	"Where Are Ü Now"	February 2015	28 August 2015 Multi-Platinum: 2×: 19 May 2017	389,654	848,976	1,238,630
Major Lazer^{featuring DJ Snake and MØ}	"Lean On"	March 2015	17 July 2015 Multi-Platinum: 2×: 26 February 2016; 3×: 31 August 2018	508,189	1,122,573	1,630,762
Wiz Khalifa^{featuring Charlie Puth}	"See You Again"	March 2015	22 May 2015 Multi-Platinum: 2×: 12 February 2016; 3×: 7 February 2020	725,538	750,415	1,475,954
Jess Glynne	"Hold My Hand"	March 2015	26 June 2015 Multi-Platinum: 2×: 28 April 2017	599,567	661,809	1,261,377
Omi	"Cheerleader"	April 2015	15 May 2015 Multi-Platinum: 2×: 7 August 2015; 3×: 3 March 2017	861,086	1,057,439	1,918,526
The Weeknd	"The Hills"	May 2015	4 December 2015 Multi-Platinum: 2×: 26 May 2017	402,281	850,674	1,252,956
Jason Derulo	"Want to Want Me"	May 2015	21 August 2015 Multi-Platinum: 2×: 14 July 2017	517,338	709,925	1,227,263
Major Lazer^{featuring Nyla and Fuse ODG}	"Light It Up"	May 2015	6 May 2016 Multi-Platinum: 2×: 16 March 2018	243,603	886,372	1,129,975
Little Mix	"Black Magic"	May 2015	13 November 2015 Multi-Platinum: 2×: 9 March 2018	511,452	602,663	1,114,114
Ed Sheeran	"Photograph"	May 2015	25 September 2015 Multi-Platinum: 2×: 17 March 2017; 3×: 12 July 2019	386,001	961,965	1,347,966
Lost Frequencies	"Are You with Me"	June 2015	4 September 2015 Multi-Platinum: 2×: 24 November 2017	472,916	704,534	1,177,449
Walk the Moon	"Shut Up and Dance"	June 2015	2 October 2015 Multi-Platinum: 2×: 3 February 2017; 3×: 15 March 2019	561,532	804,348	1,365,879
Zara Larsson	"Lush Life"	June 2015	22 April 2016 Multi-Platinum: 2×: 20 January 2017; 3×: 13 September 2019	364,088	1,044,625	1,408,713
The Weeknd	"Can't Feel My Face"	June 2015	6 November 2015 Multi-Platinum: 2×: 17 February 2017	399,177	900,528	1,299,644
Calvin Harris^{featuring Disciples}	"How Deep Is Your Love"	July 2015	30 October 2015 Multi-Platinum: 2×: 3 March 2017	428,914	859,413	1,288,326
Justin Bieber	"What Do You Mean?"	September 2015	13 November 2015 Multi-Platinum: 2×: 19 February 2016; 3×: 23 June 2017	533,581	1,320,256	1,853,837
Shawn Mendes	"Stitches"	September 2015	27 May 2016 Multi-Platinum: 2×: 26 August 2016; 3×: 14 December 2018	462,447	1,083,740	1,546,188
Zara Larsson and MNEK	"Never Forget You"	September 2015	19 February 2016 Multi-Platinum: 2×: 7 September 2018	286,487	797,993	1,084,480
DNCE	"Cake by the Ocean"	September 2015	8 July 2016 Multi-Platinum: 2×: 11 May 2018	387,666	700,763	1,088,430
Adele	"Hello"	October 2015	13 November 2015 Multi-Platinum: 2×: 22 January 2016; 3×: 9 June 2017	948,618	906,431	1,855,050
Justin Bieber	"Sorry"	October 2015	4 December 2015 Multi-Platinum: 2×: 12 February 2016; 3×: 26 August 2016; 4×: 5 October 2018	724,188	1,443,719	2,167,907
Justin Bieber	"Love Yourself"	October 2015	5 January 2016 Multi-Platinum: 2×: 4 March 2016; 3×: 28 October 2016; 4×: 10 May 2019	718,549	1,340,666	2,059,215
Coldplay	"Adventure of a Lifetime"	November 2015	15 April 2016 Multi-Platinum: 2×: 28 September 2018	358,763	667,486	1,026,248
Coldplay	"Hymn for the Weekend"	December 2015	8 July 2016 Multi-Platinum: 2×: 5 January 2018	285,453	850,515	1,135,968
Jonas Blue^{featuring Dakota}	"Fast Car"	January 2016	8 April 2016 Multi-Platinum: 2×: 30 June 2017	375,295	857,590	1,232,886
Zayn	"Pillowtalk"	January 2016	22 April 2016 Multi-Platinum: 2×: 30 August 2019	279,742	725,346	1,005,089
Lukas Graham	"7 Years"	January 2016	11 March 2016 Multi-Platinum: 2×: 3 June 2016; 3×: 9 February 2018	653,657	1,054,211	1,707,868
Rihanna^{featuring Drake}	"Work"	February 2016	8 April 2016 Multi-Platinum: 2×: 24 March 2017	320,615	979,179	1,299,794
Mike Posner	"I Took a Pill in Ibiza"	February 2016	15 April 2016 Multi-Platinum: 2×: 12 August 2016; 3×: 16 November 2018	481,827	1,112,294	1,594,122
Fifth Harmony	"Work from Home"	February 2016	27 May 2016 Multi-Platinum: 2×: 25 August 2017	327,487	882,415	1,209,902
The Chainsmokers^{featuring Daya}	"Don't Let Me Down"	February 2016	2 September 2017 Multi-Platinum: 2×: 21 July 2017	274,575	961,855	1,236,430
Kungs vs. Cookin' on 3 Burners	"This Girl"	February 2016	19 August 2016 Multi-Platinum: 2×: 9 March 2018	378,758	732,577	1,111,335
Shawn Mendes	"Treat You Better"	March 2016	21 October 2016 Multi-Platinum: 2×: 27 July 2018	234,717	807,200	1,041,918
Neiked	"Sexual"	March 2016	13 January 2017 Multi-Platinum: 2×: 8 June 2018	232,032	787,850	1,019,882
Sia	"Cheap Thrills"	March 2016	13 May 2016 Multi-Platinum: 2×: 2 September 2016; 3×: 27 October 2017; 4×: 10 April 2020	517,082	1,247,640	1,764,721
Calum Scott	"Dancing On My Own"	March 2016	26 August 2016 Multi-Platinum: 2×: 3 March 2017; 3×: 7 June 2019	564,531	799,103	1,363,635
Drake^{featuring Wizkid and Kyla}	"One Dance"	April 2016	13 May 2016 Multi-Platinum: 2×: 8 July 2016; 3×: 4 November 2016; 4×: 3 November 2017; 5×: 20 September 2019	553,973	1,791,007	2,344,981
Drake^{featuring Rihanna}	"Too Good"	April 2016	12 August 2016 Multi-Platinum: 2×: 1 December 2017	217,917	950,620	1,168,538
Calvin Harris^{featuring Rihanna}	"This Is What You Came For"	May 2016	24 June 2016 Multi-Platinum: 2×: 4 November 2016; 3×: 14 June 2019	472,496	1,029,796	1,502,292
Justin Timberlake	"Can't Stop the Feeling!"	May 2016	15 July 2016 Multi-Platinum: 2×: 3 February 2017; 3×: 29 June 2018	619,672	896,803	1,516,475
Major Lazer^{featuring Justin Bieber and MØ}	"Cold Water"	July 2016	16 September 2016 Multi-Platinum: 2×: 31 March 2017	290,821	1,028,294	1,319,114
The Chainsmokers^{featuring Halsey}	"Closer"	July 2016	16 September 2016 Multi-Platinum: 2×: 20 January 2017; 3×: 8 June 2018	399,659	1,192,591	1,592,250
James Arthur	"Say You Won't Let Go"	September 2016	4 November 2016 Multi-Platinum: 2×: 3 March 2017; 3×: 20 July 2018; 4×: 1 May 2020	441,807	1,043,327	1,485,134
DJ Snake^{featuring Justin Bieber}	"Let Me Love You"	August 2016	21 October 2016 Multi-Platinum: 2×: 10 November 2017	278,911	882,940	1,161,851
The Weeknd^{featuring Daft Punk}	"Starboy"	September 2016	16 December 2016 Multi-Platinum: 2×: 6 October 2017	260,561	921,864	1,182,426
Little Mix	"Shout Out to My Ex"	October 2016	30 December 2016 Multi-Platinum: 2×: 2 February 2018	373,706	697,130	1,070,835
Clean Bandit	"Rockabye"	October 2016	30 December 2016 Multi-Platinum: 2×: 5 May 2017; 3×: 5 April 2019	472,156	901,941	1,374,097
Rag'n'Bone Man	"Human"	November 2016	17 February 2017 Multi-Platinum: 2×: 21 July 2017; 3×: 5 April 2019	521,543	747,730	1,269,274
Ed Sheeran	"Shape of You"	January 2017	3 February 2017 Multi-Platinum: 2×: 3 March 2017; 3×: 31 March 2017; 4×: 9 June 2017; 5×: 13 October 2017; 6×: 20 April 2018; 7×: 19 April 2019	764,737	2,241,667	3,006,404
Ed Sheeran	"Castle on the Hill"	January 2017	10 February 2017 Multi-Platinum: 2×: 14 April 2017; 3×: 1 December 2017; 4×: 7 June 2019	478,716	1,192,607	1,671,322
Ed Sheeran	"Galway Girl"	March 2017	21 April 2017 Multi-Platinum: 2×: 15 September 2017; 3×: 19 April 2019	246,524	952,547	1,199,071
Clean Bandit^{featuring Zara Larsson}	"Symphony"	March 2017	26 May 2017 Multi-Platinum: 2×: 1 December 2017; 3×: 31 May 2019	264,440	802,053	1,066,492
French Montana^{featuring Swae Lee}	"Unforgettable"	April 2017	14 July 2017 Multi-Platinum: 2×: 20 October 2017; 3×: 7 September 2018	148,756	857,998	1,006,754
Luis Fonsi and Daddy Yankee^{featuring Justin Bieber}	"Despacito"	April 2017	2 June 2017 Multi-Platinum: 2×: 7 July 2017; 3×: 1 September 2017; 4×: 2 March 2018; 5×: 7 June 2019	566,425	1,334,174	1,900,599

Since the publication of the 'millionaires' by the Official Charts Company in September 2017, many other songs have been revealed as 'millionaires' through announcements on their website as well as the announcement by the British Phonographic Industry (BPI) of BPI Brit Certified Awards. Songs which have been awarded a 2× Platinum award have combined sales in excess of 1.2 million copies. The following songs have achieved a multi-platinum certification from the BPI since September 2017:

Artist	Single	Date released (Note: Unless explicitly cited, the release dates are given by the BPI.)	Date certified Platinum
Fleetwood Mac	"Go Your Own Way"	February 1977	22 September 2017 Multi-Platinum: 2×: 17 April 2020
Electric Light Orchestra	"Mr. Blue Sky"	January 1978	24 November 2017 Multi-Platinum: 2×: 17 January 2020
Queen	"Don't Stop Me Now"	February 1979	10 June 2016 Multi-Platinum: 2×: 19 April 2019
Toto	"Africa"	January 1983	15 September 2017 Multi-Platinum: 2×: 19 July 2019
Don Henley	"The Boys of Summer"	January 1985	26 March 2021 Multi-Platinum: 2×: 7 November 2025
Bryan Adams	"Summer of '69"	August 1985	9 December 2016 Multi-Platinum: 2×: 17 January 2020
Bon Jovi	"Livin' on a Prayer"	October 1986	15 April 2016 Multi-Platinum: 2×: 14 February 2020
Whitney Houston	"I Wanna Dance with Somebody (Who Loves Me)"	May 1987	9 February 2018 Multi-Platinum: 2×: 5 June 2020
Belinda Carlisle	"Heaven is a Place on Earth"	December 1987	18 March 2022 Multi-Platinum: 2×: 7 November 2025
Fleetwood Mac	"Everywhere"	March 1988	12 January 2018 Multi-Platinum: 2×: 21 February 2020
Guns N' Roses	"Sweet Child o' Mine"	August 1988	28 August 2015 Multi-Platinum: 2×: 24 May 2019
Tracy Chapman	"Fast Car"	April 1988	11 July 2014 Multi-Platinum: 2×: 5 July 2019
Nirvana	"Smells Like Teen Spirit"	November 1991	14 August 2015 Multi-Platinum: 2×: 12 April 2019
The Cranberries	"Linger"	February 1993	3 July 2020 Multi-Platinum: 2×: 14 June 2024; 3×: 7 November 2025
East 17	"Stay Another Day"	November 1994	1 December 1994 Multi-Platinum: 2×: 27 December 2019
Faithless	"Insomnia"	November 1995	31 July 2015 Multi-Platinum: 2×: 22 November 2019
Robert Miles	"Children"	February 1996	1 April 1996 Multi-Platinum: 2×: 22 May 2020
Blackstreet^{featuring Dr. Dre}	"No Diggity"	September 1996	15 April 2016 Multi-Platinum: 2×: 3 January 2020
The Verve	"Bitter Sweet Symphony"	June 1997	22 July 2013 Multi-Platinum: 2×: 21 December 2018
TLC	"No Scrubs"	March 1999	23 August 1999 Multi-Platinum: 2×: 6 July 2018
Toploader	"Dancing in the Moonlight"	February 2000	12 September 2014 Multi-Platinum: 2×: 22 February 2019
Bon Jovi	"It's My Life"	May 2000	17 November 2017 Multi-Platinum: 2×: 25 October 2024
Coldplay	"Yellow"	June 2000	9 October 2015 Multi-Platinum: 2×: 2 August 2019
Eminem	"The Real Slim Shady"	July 2000	18 July 2014 Multi-Platinum: 2×: 25 October 2019
Nickelback	"How You Remind Me"	March 2002	9 August 2013 Multi-Platinum: 2×: 13 December 2019
Eminem	"Without Me"	May 2002	22 July 2013 Multi-Platinum: 2×: 21 December 2018
50 Cent	"In da Club"	March 2003	12 September 2014 Multi-Platinum: 2×: 4 October 2019
The White Stripes	"Seven Nation Army"	April 2003	3 February 2017 Multi-Platinum: 2×: 15 November 2019
Evanescence	"Bring Me to Life"	June 2003	22 July 2013 Multi-Platinum: 2×: 1 May 2020
Beyoncé^{featuring Jay-Z}	"Crazy in Love"	July 2003	6 March 2015 Multi-Platinum: 2×: 4 January 2019
Outkast	"Hey Ya!"	November 2003	1 May 2015 Multi-Platinum: 2×: 26 April 2019
Usher^{featuring Lil Jon and Ludacris}	"Yeah!"	March 2004	15 August 2014 Multi-Platinum: 2×: 3 January 2020
Maroon 5	"She Will Be Loved"	September 2004	3 February 2017 Multi-Platinum: 2×: 22 May 2020
Jay-Z & Linkin Park	"Numb/Encore"	December 2004	7 February 2015 Multi-Platinum: 2×: 19 July 2019
James Blunt	"You're Beautiful"	May 2005	22 July 2013 Multi-Platinum: 2×: 13 December 2019
Arctic Monkeys	"I Bet You Look Good on the Dancefloor"	October 2005	30 October 2015 Multi-Platinum: 2×: 28 June 2019
The Kooks	"Naïve"	March 2006	4 March 2016 Multi-Platinum: 2×: 17 August 2018
The Kooks	"She Moves in Her Own Way"	June 2006	21 April 2017 Multi-Platinum: 2×: 21 February 2020
Arctic Monkeys	"Fluorescent Adolescent"	July 2007	30 June 2017 Multi-Platinum: 2×: 15 May 2020
Kanye West	"Stronger"	August 2007	3 April 2015 Multi-Platinum: 2×: 31 August 2018
Timbaland presents OneRepublic	"Apologize"	October 2007	22 July 2013 Multi-Platinum: 2×: 15 May 2020
Nickelback	"Rockstar"	November 2007	23 April 2010 Multi-Platinum: 2×: 5 July 2019
Estelle^{featuring Kanye West}	"American Boy"	March 2008	22 July 2013 Multi-Platinum: 2×: 21 June 2019
The Script	"The Man Who Can't Be Moved"	July 2008	22 July 2013 Multi-Platinum: 2×: 29 March 2019
Beyoncé	"If I Were a Boy"	November 2008	22 July 2013 Multi-Platinum: 2×: 19 July 2019
The Killers	"Human"	November 2008	22 July 2013 Multi-Platinum: 2×: 26 July 2019
Florence and the Machine	"Dog Days Are Over"	December 2008	15 April 2016 Multi-Platinum: 2×: 23 August 2019
James Morrison^{featuring Nelly Furtado}	"Broken Strings"	December 2008	22 July 2013 Multi-Platinum: 2×: 20 March 2020
Florence and the Machine	"You've Got the Love"	January 2009	22 July 2013 Multi-Platinum: 2×: 3 August 2018
Train	"Hey, Soul Sister"	August 2009	13 November 2015 Multi-Platinum: 2×: 17 April 2020
Flo Rida^{featuring T-Pain}	"Low"	October 2009	22 July 2013 Multi-Platinum: 2×: 14 February 2020
Taio Cruz	"Dynamite"	May 2010	22 July 2013 Multi-Platinum: 2×: 14 February 2020
B.o.B.^{featuring Hayley Williams}	"Airplanes"	June 2010	22 July 2013 Multi-Platinum: 2×: 27 December 2019
Birdy	"Skinny Love"	January 2011	19 December 2014 Multi-Platinum: 2×: 15 November 2019
Foster the People	"Pumped Up Kicks"	June 2011	18 March 2016 Multi-Platinum: 2×: 19 April 2019
Adele	"Set Fire to the Rain"	July 2011	25 January 2013 Multi-Platinum: 2×: 25 October 2019
Avicii	"Levels"	November 2011	22 July 2013 Multi-Platinum: 2×: 7 June 2019
Jay-Z and Kanye West	"Niggas in Paris"	November 2011	18 July 2014 Multi-Platinum: 2×: 21 February 2020
Flo Rida^{featuring Sia}	"Wild Ones"	January 2012	22 July 2013 Multi-Platinum: 2×: 7 February 2020
Mumford & Sons	"I Will Wait"	September 2012	18 December 2015 Multi-Platinum: 2×: 5 July 2019
Taylor Swift	"I Knew You Were Trouble"	December 2012	22 July 2013 Multi-Platinum: 2×: 13 March 2020
Rihanna^{featuring Mikky Ekko}	"Stay"	January 2013	28 March 2014 Multi-Platinum: 2×: 29 November 2019
Imagine Dragons	"Demons"	January 2013	8 April 2016 Multi-Platinum: 2×: 30 August 2019
Bruno Mars	"When I Was Your Man"	February 2013	2 August 2013 Multi-Platinum: 2×: 25 October 2019
The 1975	"Chocolate"	March 2013	15 July 2016 Multi-Platinum: 2×: 17 April 2020
Drake^{featuring Majid Jordan}	"Hold On, We're Going Home"	August 2013	1 August 2014 Multi-Platinum: 2×: 20 September 2019
Katy Perry^{featuring Juicy J}	"Dark Horse"	December 2013	1 August 2014 Multi-Platinum: 2×: 5 June 2020
A Great Big World and Christina Aguilera	"Say Something"	February 2014	4 July 2014 Multi-Platinum: 2×: 29 May 2020
Calvin Harris	"Summer"	March 2014	17 October 2014 Multi-Platinum: 2×: 10 January 2020
Coldplay	"A Sky Full of Stars"	May 2014	22 May 2015 Multi-Platinum: 2×: 21 February 2020
Ed Sheeran	"Bloodstream"	June 2014	21 August 2015 Multi-Platinum: 2×: 2 August 2019
George Ezra	"Blame It On Me"	August 2014	1 May 2015 Multi-Platinum: 2×: 23 August 2019
Sia	"Elastic Heart"	January 2015	27 November 2015 Multi-Platinum: 2×: 29 May 2020
Twenty One Pilots	"Stressed Out"	April 2015	29 July 2016 Multi-Platinum: 2×: 15 March 2019
Drake	"Hotline Bling"	July 2015	5 February 2016 Multi-Platinum: 2×: 6 December 2019
Jess Glynne	"Don't Be So Hard on Yourself"	August 2015	29 January 2016 Multi-Platinum: 2×: 19 April 2019
Little Mix featuring Jason Derulo	"Secret Love Song"	November 2015	23 September 2016 Multi-Platinum: 2×: 30 October 2020
Tinie Tempah^{featuring Zara Larsson}	"Girls Like"	February 2016	1 July 2016 Multi-Platinum: 2×: 13 December 2019
Alan Walker	"Faded"	February 2016	8 July 2016 Multi-Platinum: 2×: 4 January 2019
Gnash^{featuring Olivia O'Brien}	"I Hate U, I Love U"	February 2016	30 September 2016 Multi-Platinum: 2×: 5 June 2020
Ariana Grande	"Into You"	May 2016	3 February 2017 Multi-Platinum: 2×: 14 February 2020
Twenty One Pilots	"Heathens"	June 2016	25 November 2016 Multi-Platinum: 2×: 21 February 2020
Jonas Blue^{featuring JP Cooper}	"Perfect Strangers"	June 2016	7 October 2016 Multi-Platinum: 2×: 24 May 2019
Hailee Steinfeld and Grey^{featuring Zedd}	"Starving"	July 2016	3 February 2017 Multi-Platinum: 2×: 3 April 2020
Ariana Grande^{featuring Nicki Minaj}	"Side to Side"	August 2016	20 January 2017 Multi-Platinum: 2×: 28 June 2019
JP Cooper	"September Song"	September 2016	5 May 2017 Multi-Platinum: 2×: 23 August 2019
Maggie Lindemann	"Pretty Girl"	September 2016	8 September 2017 Multi-Platinum: 2×: 17 April 2020
Bruno Mars	"24k Magic"	October 2016	17 February 2017 Multi-Platinum: 2×: 1 May 2020
Martin Jensen	"Solo Dance"	November 2016	9 June 2017 Multi-Platinum: 2×: 19 April 2019
Little Mix	"Touch"	December 2016	17 March 2017 Multi-Platinum: 2×: 3 August 2018
Jax Jones^{featuring Raye}	"You Don't Know Me"	December 2016	31 March 2017 Multi-Platinum: 2×: 11 May 2018
Imagine Dragons	"Believer"	February 2017	1 June 2018 Multi-Platinum: 2×: 16 March 2018; 3×: 13 March 2020
Jason Derulo^{featuring Nicki Minaj and Ty Dolla $ign}	"Swalla"	February 2017	14 July 2017 Multi-Platinum: 2×: 17 April 2020
The Chainsmokers and Coldplay	"Something Just Like This"	February 2017	26 May 2017 Multi-Platinum: 2×: 16 March 2018; 3×: 20 March 2020
J Hus	"Did You See"	March 2017	11 August 2017 Multi-Platinum: 2×: 5 July 2019
Lewis Capaldi	"Bruises"	March 2017	6 September 2019 Multi-Platinum: 2×: 21 February 2020
Portugal. The Man	"Feel It Still"	March 2017	23 March 2018 Multi-Platinum: 2×: 9 November 2018
Drake	"Passionfruit"	March 2017	28 July 2017 Multi-Platinum: 2×: 15 May 2020
Shawn Mendes	"There's Nothing Holdin' Me Back"	April 2017	28 July 2017 Multi-Platinum: 2×: 7 December 2018
Little Mix	"Power"	May 2017	29 September 2019 Multi-Platinum: 2×: 17 January 2020
Jonas Blue^{featuring William Singe}	"Mama"	May 2017	11 August 2017 Multi-Platinum: 2×: 4 January 2019
DJ Khaled^{featuring Justin Bieber, Quavo, Chance the Rapper and Lil Wayne}	"I'm the One"	May 2017	7 July 2017 Multi-Platinum: 2×: 2 November 2018
Rita Ora	"Your Song"	May 2017	29 September 2017 Multi-Platinum: 2×: 8 May 2020
Sigala and Ella Eyre	"Came Here for Love"	June 2017	8 December 2017 Multi-Platinum: 2×: 7 February 2020
Calvin Harris^{featuring Pharrell Williams, Katy Perry and Big Sean}	"Feels"	June 2017	29 September 2017 Multi-Platinum: 2×: 25 October 2019
DJ Khaled^{featuring Rihanna and Bryson Tiller}	"Wild Thoughts"	June 2017	18 August 2017 Multi-Platinum: 2×: 13 July 2018
Dua Lipa	"New Rules"	July 2017	13 October 2017 Multi-Platinum: 2×: 2 February 2018; 3×: 19 October 2018
Marshmello^{featuring Khalid}	"Silence"	August 2017	5 January 2018 Multi-Platinum: 2×: 10 May 2019
Camila Cabello^{featuring Young Thug}	"Havana"	August 2017	24 November 2017 Multi-Platinum: 2×: 23 February 2018; 3×: 11 January 2019
CNCO and Little Mix	"Reggaetón Lento (Remix)"	August 2017	29 December 2017 Multi-Platinum: 2×: 26 August 2021
Post Malone^{featuring 21 Savage}	"Rockstar"	September 2017	24 November 2017 Multi-Platinum: 2×: 13 April 2018; 3×: 31 May 2019
Sam Smith	"Too Good at Goodbyes"	September 2017	8 December 2017 Multi-Platinum: 2×: 13 April 2018; 3×: 1 March 2019
Tom Walker	"Leave A Light On"	October 2017	14 September 2018 Multi-Platinum: 2×: 30 August 2019
Loud Luxury^{featuring Brando}	"Body"	October 2017	26 October 2018 Multi-Platinum: 2×: 13 September 2019
Rita Ora	"Anywhere"	October 2017	9 February 2018 Multi-Platinum: 2×: 5 July 2019
Ed Sheeran	"Perfect"	December 2017	15 September 2017 Multi-Platinum: 2×: 22 December 2017; 3×: 16 March 2018; 4×: 19 October 2018; 5×: 20 September 2019
Hugh Jackman, Keala Settle, Zac Efron and Zendaya	"The Greatest Show"	December 2017	10 August 2018 Multi-Platinum: 2×: 6 September 2019
Keala Settle^{and The Greatest Showman Ensemble}	"This Is Me"	December 2017	27 April 2018 Multi-Platinum: 2×: 12 October 2018; 3×: 5 July 2019
Rudimental^{featuring Jess Glynne, Macklemore and Dan Caplen}	"These Days"	January 2018	13 April 2018 Multi-Platinum: 2×: 31 August 2018; 3×: 1 November 2019
George Ezra	"Paradise"	January 2018	8 June 2018 Multi-Platinum: 2×: 31 August 2018; 3×: 22 February 2019
Dua Lipa	"IDGAF"	January 2018	6 April 2018 Multi-Platinum: 2×: 24 May 2019
Marshmello and Ann-Marie	"Friends"	February 2018	25 May 2018 Multi-Platinum: 2×: 22 November 2020
5 Seconds of Summer	"Youngblood"	April 2018	5 October 2018 Multi-Platinum: 2×: 10 January 2020
Ariana Grande	"No Tears Left to Cry"	April 2018	6 July 2018 Multi-Platinum: 2×: 24 May 2019
Anne-Marie	"2002"	April 2018	27 July 2018 Multi-Platinum: 2×: 17 May 2019
Calvin Harris and Dua Lipa	"One Kiss"	April 2018	25 May 2018 Multi-Platinum: 2×: 10 August 2018; 3×: 3 May 2019
Drake	"Nice for What"	April 2018	8 June 2018 Multi-Platinum: 2×: 25 January 2019
Cardi B, Bad Bunny and J Balvin	"I Like It"	April 2018	31 August 2018 Multi-Platinum: 2×: 8 May 2020
George Ezra	"Shotgun"	May 2018	27 July 2018 Multi-Platinum: 2×: 19 October 2018; 3×: 15 March 2019; 4×: 18 October 2019
Clean Bandit^{featuring Demi Lovato}	"Solo"	May 2018	24 August 2018 Multi-Platinum: 2×: 24 January 2020
Panic! at the Disco	"High Hopes"	May 2018	1 March 2019 Multi-Platinum: 2×: 14 February 2020
Maroon 5^{featuring Cardi B}	"Girls Like You"	May 2018	19 October 2018 Multi-Platinum: 2×: 8 November 2019
Juice Wrld	"Lucid Dreams"	May 2018	30 November 2018 Multi-Platinum: 2×: 5 June 2020
Tyga^{featuring Offset}	"Taste"	May 2018	16 November 2018 Multi-Platinum: 2×: 5 June 2020
Post Malone	"Better Now"	June 2018	7 September 2018 Multi-Platinum: 2×: 22 November 2019
Drake	"In My Feelings"	July 2018	7 September 2018 Multi-Platinum: 2×: 3 January 2020
Benny Blanco, Halsey and Khalid	"Eastside"	July 2018	26 October 2018 Multi-Platinum: 2×: 24 May 2019
Marshmello and Bastille	"Happier"	August 2018	4 January 2019 Multi-Platinum: 2×: 6 December 2019
Calvin Harris and Sam Smith	"Promises"	August 2018	9 November 2018 Multi-Platinum: 2×: 14 June 2019
Ava Max	"Sweet but Psycho"	August 2018	1 February 2019 Multi-Platinum: 2×: 31 May 2019
Lady Gaga and Bradley Cooper	"Shallow"	October 2018	15 February 2019 Multi-Platinum: 5×: 16 June 2023
Lady Gaga featuring Beyoncé	"Telephone"	November 2009	22 July 2013 Multi-Platinum: 2×: 11 March 2022
Post Malone^{featuring Swae Lee}	"Sunflower"	October 2018	15 March 2019 Multi-Platinum: 2×: 15 November 2019
Ariana Grande	"Thank U, Next"	November 2018	11 January 2019 Multi-Platinum: 2×: 15 November 2019
Lewis Capaldi	"Someone You Loved"	November 2018	5 April 2019 Multi-Platinum: 2×: 7 June 2019; 3×: 6 September 2019; 4×: 10 January 2020; 5×: 29 May 2020
Calvin Harris^{featuring Rag'n'Bone Man}	"Giant"	January 2019	12 April 2019 Multi-Platinum: 2×: 11 October 2019
Tom Walker	"Just You and I"	January 2019	10 May 2019 Multi-Platinum: 2×: 28 February 2020
Sam Smith and Normani	"Dancing with a Stranger"	January 2019	10 May 2019 Multi-Platinum: 2×: 26 February 2021
Mabel	"Don't Call Me Up"	January 2019	10 May 2019 Multi-Platinum: 2×: 13 March 2020
Meduza^{featuring Goodboys}	"Piece of Your Heart"	February 2019	28 June 2019 Multi-Platinum: 2×: 17 April 2020
Lil Nas X	"Old Town Road"	March 2019	31 May 2019 Multi-Platinum: 2×: 2 August 2019; 3×: 17 January 2020
Billie Eilish	"Bad Guy"	March 2019	21 June 2019 Multi-Platinum: 2×: 1 November 2019
Dave^{featuring Burna Boy}	"Location"	March 2019	2 August 2019 Multi-Platinum: 2×: 10 April 2020
Stormzy	"Vossi Bop"	April 2019	5 July 2019 Multi-Platinum: 2×: 24 January 2020
Ed Sheeran and Justin Bieber	"I Don't Care"	May 2019	5 July 2019 Multi-Platinum: 2×: 4 October 2019
Lewis Capaldi	"Hold Me While You Wait"	May 2019	16 August 2019 Multi-Platinum: 2×: 13 March 2020
Shawn Mendes and Camila Cabello	"Señorita"	June 2019	30 August 2019 Multi-Platinum: 2×: 28 February 2020
AJ Tracey	"Ladbroke Grove"	June 2019	20 September 2019 Multi-Platinum: 2×: 24 April 2020
Ed Sheeran^{featuring Khalid}	"Beautiful People"	July 2019	20 September 2019 Multi-Platinum: 2×: 29 May 2020
Tones and I	"Dance Monkey"	July 2019	8 November 2019 Multi-Platinum: 2×: 10 January 2020; 3×: 3 April 2020
The Weeknd	"Blinding Lights"	November 2019	6 March 2020 Multi-Platinum: 2×: 8 May 2020
Dua Lipa	"Don't Start Now"	November 2019	31 January 2020 Multi-Platinum: 2×: 29 May 2020

== See also ==
- List of best-selling singles in the United Kingdom
- List of most streamed songs in the United Kingdom
- List of Platinum singles in the United Kingdom awarded before 2000
- List of Platinum singles in the United Kingdom awarded since 2000
