= List of Platinum singles in the United Kingdom awarded before 2000 =

See also List of Platinum singles in the United Kingdom awarded since 2000, List of million-selling singles in the United Kingdom.

The Platinum designation is awarded by the British Phonographic Industry (BPI) to singles and albums that have reached sales or shipments over a given threshold. From 1 April 1973 until 1988, the threshold was 1 million. The double and triple Platinum designations were introduced in 1985. In 1989, the thresholds were lowered; a single with sales or shipments of 600,000 became eligible for Platinum. The only song to be certified Platinum during both periods is "Bohemian Rhapsody" by Queen, for its original release in 1975 and its re-release in 1991 after the death of Freddie Mercury.

The Spice Girls had the most Platinum singles awarded before 2000: eight.

This total has been passed in the 21st century by Rihanna with 13.

== Awards from 1973–1988 (1 million units) ==
=== 2× Platinum (available 1985 onwards) ===
Only one single was awarded a multi-Platinum certification during the 1-million-unit era, although "Do They Know It's Christmas?" by Band Aid would also have qualified.

Artist	Song	Date released	Date certified Platinum	Date certified 2× Platinum
Wings	"Mull of Kintyre"	November 1977	December 1977	November 1986

=== Platinum (1973–1988) ===
Artist	Song	Date released	Date certified Platinum
Simon Park Orchestra	"Eye Level"	November 1972	January 1978
Gary Glitter	"I Love You Love Me Love"	November 1973	January 1974
Slade	"Merry Xmas Everybody"	December 1973	December 1980
John Lennon	"Imagine"	October 1975	February 1981
Queen	"Bohemian Rhapsody"	October 1975	January 1976
Brotherhood of Man	"Save Your Kisses for Me"	March 1976	May 1976
David Soul	"Don't Give Up on Us"	December 1976	February 1977
Boney M.	"Rivers of Babylon" / "Brown Girl in the Ring"	April 1978	May 1978
Olivia Newton-John & John Travolta	"You're the One That I Want"	May 1978	July 1978
Olivia Newton-John & John Travolta	"Summer Nights"	September 1978	October 1978
Village People	"Y.M.C.A."	November 1978	January 1979
Boney M	"Mary's Boy Child – Oh My Lord"	November 1978	December 1978
Art Garfunkel	"Bright Eyes"	January 1979	May 1979
Blondie	"Heart of Glass"	January 1979	February 1979
Pink Floyd	"Another Brick in the Wall (Part II)"	November 1979	January 1980
Human League	"Don't You Want Me"	November 1981	January 1982
Dexys Midnight Runners	"Come On Eileen"	June 1982	September 1982
Culture Club	"Karma Chameleon"	September 1983	October 1983
Frankie Goes to Hollywood	"Relax"	January 1984	March 1984
Frankie Goes to Hollywood	"Two Tribes"	June 1984	June 1984
George Michael	"Careless Whisper"	July 1984	September 1984
Stevie Wonder	"I Just Called to Say I Love You"	August 1984	September 1984
Band Aid	"Do They Know It's Christmas?"	November 1984	December 1984
Wham!	"Last Christmas"	December 1984	January 1985
Jennifer Rush	"The Power of Love"	May 1985	November 1985

== Awards from 1989–1999 (600,000 units) ==
=== Multi-Platinum ===
Only one single was awarded a multiple above double: "Candle in the Wind 1997"/"Something About the Way You Look Tonight" by Elton John which is certified as 9× Platinum for shipping over 5.4 million units, following the funeral of Diana, Princess of Wales in 1997.

==== 9× Platinum ====
Artist	Song	Date released	Date certified multi-Platinum
Elton John	"Candle in the Wind 1997"/"Something About the Way You Look Tonight"	September 1997	October 1997

==== 2× Platinum ====
Artist	Song	Date released	Date certified double platinum
Bryan Adams	"(Everything I Do) I Do It for You"	June 1991	September 1991
Whitney Houston	"I Will Always Love You"	October 1992	January 1993
Wet Wet Wet	"Love Is All Around"	May 1994	August 1994
Robson & Jerome	"Unchained Melody/White Cliffs of Dover"	May 1995	May 1995
Fugees	"Killing Me Softly"	June 1996	August 1996‡
Spice Girls	"Wannabe"	July 1996	December 1996
Puff Daddy featuring Faith Evans	"I'll Be Missing You"	June 1997	August 1997†
Aqua	"Barbie Girl"	October 1997	December 1997†
All Saints	"Never Ever"	November 1997	January 1998
Various Artists	"Perfect Day"	November 1997	January 1998
Teletubbies	"Teletubbies say "Eh-oh!""	December 1997	December 1997
Robbie Williams	"Angels"	December 1997	December 1998
Celine Dion	"My Heart Will Go On"	February 1998	April 1998
Cher	"Believe"	October 1998	January 1999†
Britney Spears	"...Baby One More Time"	February 1999	March 1999

†Awarded triple platinum after 2000
‡Also awarded double platinum in 2013

=== Platinum awards ===
Artist	Song	Date released	Date certified Platinum
Jive Bunny and the Mastermixers	"Swing the Mood"	August 1989	August 1989
Black Box	"Ride on Time"	August 1989	October 1989
Band Aid II	"Do They Know It's Christmas?"	December 1989	April 1990
Sinéad O'Connor	"Nothing Compares 2 U"	January 1990	March 1990
Elton John	"Sacrifice"	May 1990	September 1990
The Righteous Brothers	"Unchained Melody"	October 1990	November 1990
Vanilla Ice	"Ice Ice Baby"	October 1990	January 1991
Queen	"Bohemian Rhapsody / These are the Days of Our Lives"	December 1991	December 1991
Charles & Eddie	"Would I Lie to You?"	October 1992	January 1993
Ace of Base	"All That She Wants"	May 1993	June 1993
UB40	"(I Can't Help) Falling in Love with You"	May 1993	July 1993
Meat Loaf	"I'd Do Anything for Love (but I Won't Do That)"	September 1993	November 1993
Mr. Blobby	"Mr. Blobby"	November 1993	December 1993
Take That	"Babe"	December 1993	January 1994
All4One	"I Swear"	June 1994	September 1994
Whigfield	"Saturday Night"	September 1994	September 1994
Pato Banton	"Baby Come Back"	September 1994	November 1994
Celine Dion	"Think Twice"	October 1994	January 1995
East 17	"Stay Another Day"	November 1994	December 1994
Rednex	"Cotton Eye Joe"	December 1994	February 1995
Take That	"Back for Good"	March 1995	April 1995
The Rembrandts	"I'll be There for You"	August 1995	July 1997
Simply Red	"Fairground"	September 1995	November 1995
Coolio featuring L.V.	"Gangsta's Paradise"	October 1995	November 1995†
Everything but the Girl	"Missing"	October 1995	January 1996
Robson & Jerome	"I Believe (1953 song)/Up on the Roof"	October 1995	November 1995
Oasis	"Wonderwall"	October 1995	January 1996†
Boyzone	"Father and Son"	November 1995	January 1996
Michael Jackson	"Earth Song"	November 1995	December 1995
Babylon Zoo	"Spaceman"	January 1996	January 1996
Robert Miles	"Children"	February 1996	April 1996
Oasis	"Don't Look Back in Anger"	February 1996	April 1996†
Take That	"How Deep is Your Love"	February 1996	March 1996
Mark Morrison	"Return of the Mack"	March 1996	May 1996
Gina G	"Ooh Aah... Just a Little Bit"	March 1996	May 1996
Peter Andre	"Mysterious Girl"	May 1996	August 1996
Baddiel, Skinner & The Lightning Seeds	"Three Lions"	June 1996	July 1996
Louise	"Naked"	June 1996	December 1996
Spice Girls	"Wannabe"	July 1996	August 1996†
Spice Girls	"Say You'll be There"	October 1996	October 1996
Toni Braxton	"Un-Break My Heart"	October 1996	January 1997
Robson & Jerome	"What Becomes of the Brokenhearted"	October 1996	January 1997
The Prodigy	"Breathe"	November 1996	January 1997
Dunblane	"Knockin' on Heaven's Door"	December 1996	December 1996
Spice Girls	"2 Become 1"	December 1996	December 1996
Spice Girls	"Mama / Who Do You Think You Are"	March 1997	March 1997
R. Kelly	"I Believe I Can Fly"	March 1997	June 1997
Hanson	"MMMBop"	May 1997	June 1997
Oasis	"D'you Know What I Mean?"	July 1997	July 1997
Will Smith	"Men in Black"	August 1997	August 1997
Chumbawamba	"Tubthumping"	August 1997	October 1997
Spice Girls	"Spice Up Your Life"	October 1997	October 1997
Natalie Imbruglia	"Torn"	October 1997	December 1997†
All Saints	"Never Ever"	November 1997	December 1997
Janet Jackson	"Together Again"	December 1997	January 1998
Spice Girls	"Too Much"	December 1997	January 1998
Savage Garden	"Truly Madly Deeply"	February 1998	May 1998
LeAnn Rimes	"How Do I Live?"	March 1998	July 1998
Run–D.M.C. vs. Jason Nevins	"It's Like That"	March 1998	March 1998†
Baddiel, Skinner & The Lightning Seeds	"3 Lions '98"	June 1998	July 1998
B*Witched	"C'est la Vie"	June 1998	July 1998
Spice Girls	"Viva Forever"	July 1998	August 1998
Pras Michel featuring ODB & Mýa	"Ghetto Supastar (That is What You Are)"	August 1998	August 1998
Boyzone	"No Matter What"	August 1998	August 1998
Stardust	"Music Sounds Better with You"	August 1998	November 1998
Steps	"Heartbeat / Tragedy"	November 1998	January 1999
Bryan Adams featuring Melanie C	"When You're Gone"	November 1998	February 1999
Spice Girls	"Goodbye"	December 1998	December 1998
Chef	"Chocolate Salty Balls"	December 1998	February 1999
Boyzone	"When the Going Gets Tough"	March 1999	March 1999
Mr. Oizo	"Flat Beat"	March 1999	April 1999
TLC	"No Scrubs"	March 1999	July 1999
Martine McCutcheon	"Perfect Moment"	April 1999	May 1999
Shania Twain	"That Don't Impress Me Much"	May 1999	July 1999
Shanks & Bigfoot	"Sweet Like Chocolate"	May 1999	June 1999
S Club 7	"Bring It All Back"	June 1999	July 1999
ATB	"9 PM (Till I Come)"	June 1999	July 1999
Ricky Martin	"Livin' la Vida Loca"	July 1999	August 1999
Lou Bega	"Mambo No. 5 (a Little Bit of...)"	August 1999	September 1999
Eiffel 65	"Blue (Da Ba Dee)"	September 1999	October 1999
Cliff Richard	"Millennium Prayer"	November 1999	December 1999
Westlife	"I Have a Dream" / "Seasons in the Sun"	December 1999	December 1999

†Certified 2× Platinum since 2000
