= List of most-streamed songs in the United Kingdom =

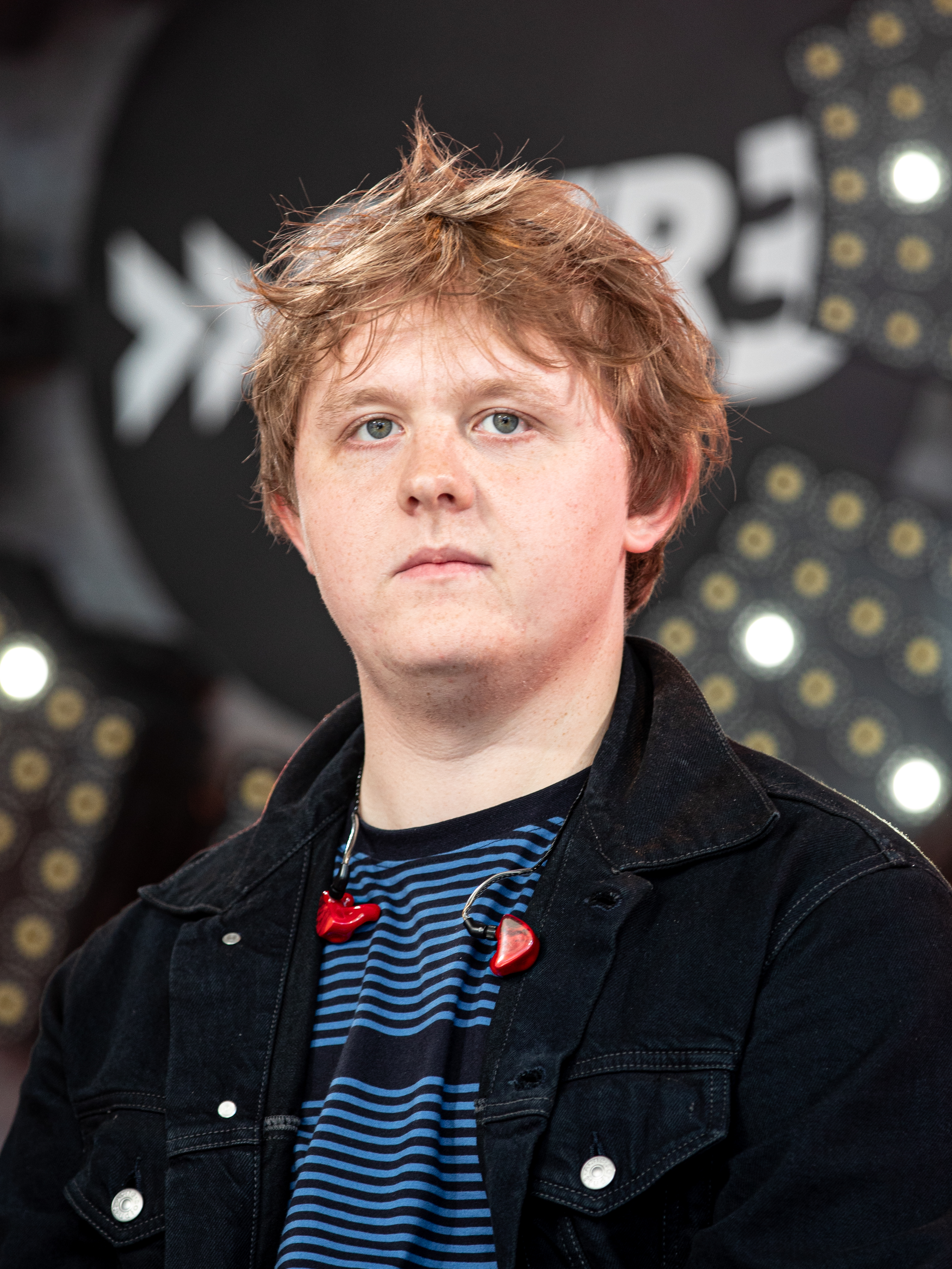
Having been streamed over 562 million times, "Someone You Loved" by Lewis Capaldi is the UK's most-streamed song (up to November 2022).

In June 2014, the Official Charts Company (OCC) started including audio streams in the official UK Singles Chart, recognising their importance as an indicator of current popular trends and tastes in music. From this point onward, the popularity of a single or album track can be measured by both sales (which include paid downloads) and streams on officially recognised subscription and ad-funded on-demand services. Although the OCC added these figures to the chart in July 2014, they started compiling them in May 2012 through the Official Audio Streaming Chart. They are taken from on-demand audio streaming services such as Spotify, Apple Music, Amazon Music, Deezer and Tidal, all of which are members of the Digital Entertainment and Retail Association (ERA). Video streams were also added in June 2018, with a new weighting system applied to "premium" streams (those on paid subscription services) and "free" streams (those on ad-supported services like YouTube and the free tier of Spotify).

In June 2016, "Sorry" by Justin Bieber became the first song to pass 100 million streams. By September 2016, it had been joined by two other Bieber songs: "Love Yourself" and "What Do You Mean?" as well as "One Dance" by Drake (the first song to achieve 100 million streams in a calendar year).

Up to November 2022, the most-streamed song in the UK is "Someone You Loved" by Lewis Capaldi, with over 562 million streams. The song with the most streams in a single chart week is "Easy on Me" by Adele in the week ending 28 October 2021 with 24 million streams, whilst Little Mix hold the record for the most streamed girl group single, "Shout Out to My Ex".

== History ==
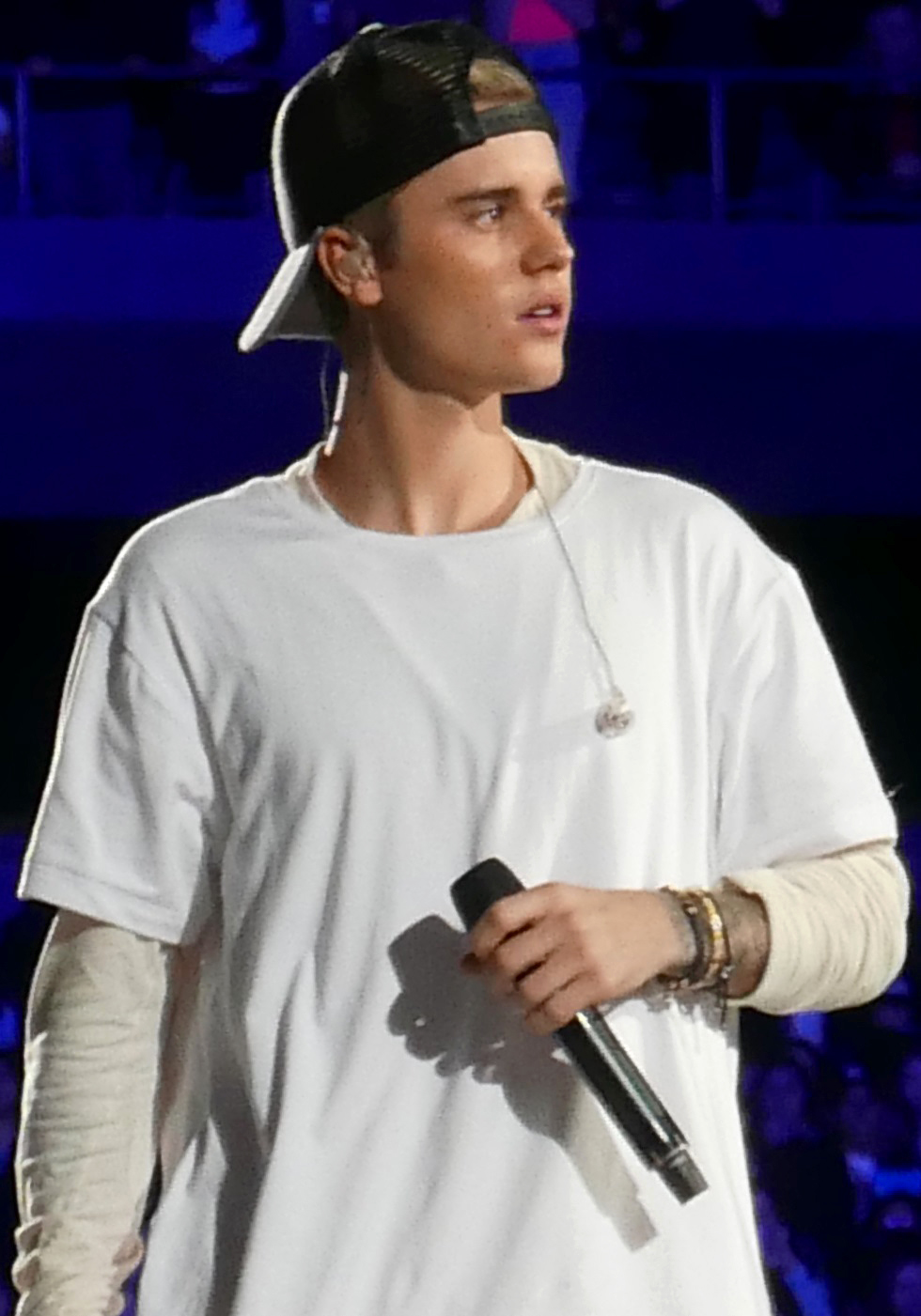
"Sorry" by Justin Bieber (pictured) was the first song with over 100 million streams in the UK.

In July 2014, the OCC announced that "Pompeii" by Bastille was the most-streamed song in the UK with 26.6 million streams. "Rather Be" by Clean Bandit featuring Jess Glynne was the most-streamed song in 2014 with just short of 40 million streams, whilst "Cheerleader" by OMI was the most-streamed song of 2015 with 71.7 million.

The record for most streams in a week has been broken many times since 2012 when the OCC started measuring it as streaming levels have continued to grow. In 2013, "Get Lucky" by Daft Punk was the first song to achieve 1 million streams in a week, "Uptown Funk" broke the 2 million streams barrier at the end of 2014 and in April 2015, "See You Again" by Wiz Khalifa featuring Charlie Puth passed 3 million streams. In November 2015, "Hello" by Adele almost doubled the record to 7.32 million streams and, in the same week, Bieber also passed 4 million with "Sorry".

In the week ending 4 October 2014, "All About That Bass" by Meghan Trainor became the first single ever to reach the UK top 40 on streams alone before it was available to buy and in the week ending 13 December 2014, "Thinking Out Loud" became the first song to reach number one despite selling less than Union J's "You Got It All", the number-two song, due to streaming.

During 2015, streaming grew with an 80 per cent increase in the first half of the year compared with the same period in 2014, with 59 songs being streamed more than 10 million times and 17 more than 20 million times. In total 53.7 billion songs were streamed in the UK in 2015, equating to almost 2,000 songs played in each UK household.

In December 2016, the OCC announced that streaming had grown from 275 million per week in 2014 to 990 million and, consequently, the formula for converting streams to sale equivalents in the singles chart would be changed from 100:1 to 150:1 from January 2017. Additionally, in June 2017, it was decided that after a record has spent at least 10 weeks on the chart, any track which has declined for three consecutive weeks will see its streams:sales ratio change from 150:1 to 300:1, in an attempt to accelerate their disappearance from the chart.

"Shape of You" by Ed Sheeran was the UK's most streamed song from July 2017 until November 2022, when it was overtaken by Lewis Capaldi's "Someone You Loved".

== Most-streamed songs ==
These are the UK's 50 most-streamed songs using data from January 2014 to November 2022.

| Position | Song name | Artist | Released |
|---|---|---|---|
| 1. | "Someone You Loved" | Lewis Capaldi | November 2018 |
| 2. | "Shape of You" | Ed Sheeran | January 2017 |
| 3. | "Perfect" / "Perfect Duet" / "Perfect Symphony" | Ed Sheeran / Ed Sheeran featuring Beyoncé / Ed Sheeran featuring Andrea Bocelli | January 2017; December 2017; December 2017 |
| 4. | "Shotgun" | George Ezra | May 2018 |
| 5. | "Dance Monkey" | Tones and I | May 2019 |
| 6. | "Blinding Lights" | The Weeknd | November 2019 |
| 7. | "Mr. Brightside" | The Killers | May 2004 |
| 8. | "Baby Shark" | Pinkfong | August 2018 |
| 9. | "Despacito" / "Despacito (Remix)" | Luis Fonsi featuring Daddy Yankee / Luis Fonsi and Daddy Yankee featuring Justin Bieber | January 2017; April 2017 |
| 10. | "Shallow" | Lady Gaga and Bradley Cooper | September 2018 |
| 11. | "Old Town Road" | Lil Nas X | March 2019 |
| 12. | "Say You Won't Let Go" | James Arthur | September 2016 |
| 13. | "Thinking Out Loud" | Ed Sheeran | June 2014 |
| 14. | "Bad Habits" | Ed Sheeran | June 2021 |
| 15. | "One Dance" | Drake featuring Wizkid and Kyla | April 2016 |
| 16. | "Unforgettable" | French Montana featuring Swae Lee | April 2017 |
| 17. | "Sunflower" | Post Malone and Swae Lee | October 2018 |
| 18. | "Castle on the Hill" | Ed Sheeran | January 2017 |
| 19. | "One Kiss" | Calvin Harris featuring Dua Lipa | April 2018 |
| 20. | "Bad Guy" | Billie Eilish | March 2019 |
| 21. | "All I Want for Christmas Is You" | Mariah Carey | October 1994 |
| 22. | "I Don't Care" | Ed Sheeran and Justin Bieber | May 2019 |
| 23. | "New Rules" | Dua Lipa | July 2017 |
| 24. | "Riptide" | Vance Joy | November 2013 |
| 25. | "Head & Heart" | Joel Corry featuring MNEK | July 2020 |
| 26. | "Girls Like You" | Maroon 5 featuring Cardi B | May 2018 |
| 27. | "Sweet but Psycho" | Ava Max | July 2018 |
| 28. | "Wonderwall" | Oasis | October 1995 |
| 29. | "This Is Me" | Keala Settle and The Greatest Showman Ensemble | December 2017 |
| 30. | "Bruises" | Lewis Capaldi | March 2017 |
| 31. | "Last Christmas" | Wham! | December 1984 |
| 32. | "These Days" | Rudimental featuring Jess Glynne, Macklemore, and Dan Caplen | January 2018 |
| 33. | "Location" | Dave featuring Burna Boy | March 2019 |
| 34. | "Eastside" | Benny Blanco, Halsey and Khalid | July 2018 |
| 35. | "God's Plan" | Drake | January 2018 |
| 36. | "All of Me" | John Legend | February 2014 |
| 37. | "Cheap Thrills" | Sia featuring Sean Paul | March 2016 |
| 38. | "Rockstar" | Post Malone featuring 21 Savage | September 2017 |
| 39. | "Uptown Funk" | Mark Ronson featuring Bruno Mars | December 2014 |
| 40. | "Don't Start Now" | Dua Lipa | December 2019 |
| 41. | "Havana" | Camila Cabello featuring Young Thug | August 2017 |
| 42. | "Before You Go" | Lewis Capaldi | November 2019 |
| 43. | "Lucid Dreams" | Juice Wrld | May 2018 |
| 44. | "Take Me to Church" | Hozier | January 2014 |
| 45. | "Can't Stop the Feeling!" | Justin Timberlake | May 2016 |
| 46. | "Vossi Bop" | Stormzy | April 2019 |
| 47. | "Photograph" | Ed Sheeran | June 2014 |
| 48. | "Sorry" | Justin Bieber | October 2015 |
| 49. | "Closer" | The Chainsmokers featuring Halsey | July 2016 |
| 50. | "Do I Wanna Know?" | Arctic Monkeys | June 2013 |
As of November 2022

== See also ==
- List of Spotify streaming records
